= Geology of London =

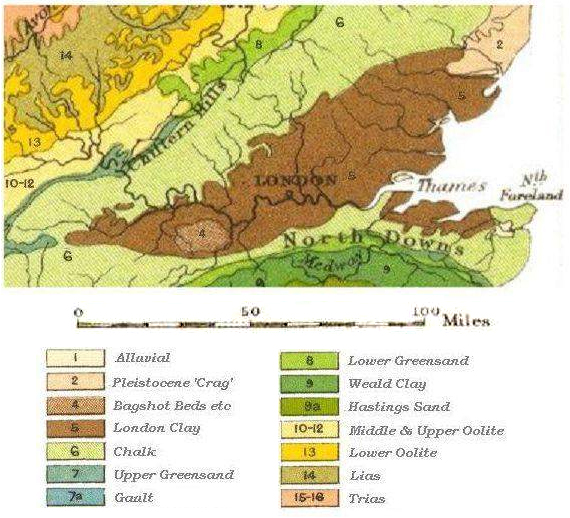
Geological map of the London Basin

The geology of London comprises various differing layers of sedimentary rock upon which London, England is built.

== Oldest rocks ==
The oldest rocks proved through boreholes to exist below London are the old, hard rocks of the Palaeozoic. These consist of Silurian mudstones and sandstones, generally overlain by Devonian strata which are largely of Old Red Sandstone. The Devonian rocks are absent in parts of South London. The Palaeozoic rocks dip southwards and are more than 1,000 metres below the English Channel. Above this is a 60-metre thick layer of impermeable Gault clays. These clays are relatively young, only going back to the early Cretaceous which began around 144 million years ago.

On top of these clays is a non-contiguous layer of Upper Greensand above which lies a rolling bed of white chalk about 200 metres thick. In the Lower Chalk and in the lower region of the Middle Chalk there are abundant fossilized shell fragments, especially Inoceramus clams. In places these form the greater part of the rock but they decrease in amount upwards in the succession. Flints are abundant in the Upper Chalk.

These bands of chalk form the basis of the London Basin, a syncline the outcrop of which is v-shaped opening to the east and bounded by chalk outcrops forming hills: the North Downs to the south of London, and the Chilterns to the north. The chalk is a soft white limestone that is different in appearance to other limestones because it is porous and earthy whilst others are compact and crystalline.

== Tertiary period ==
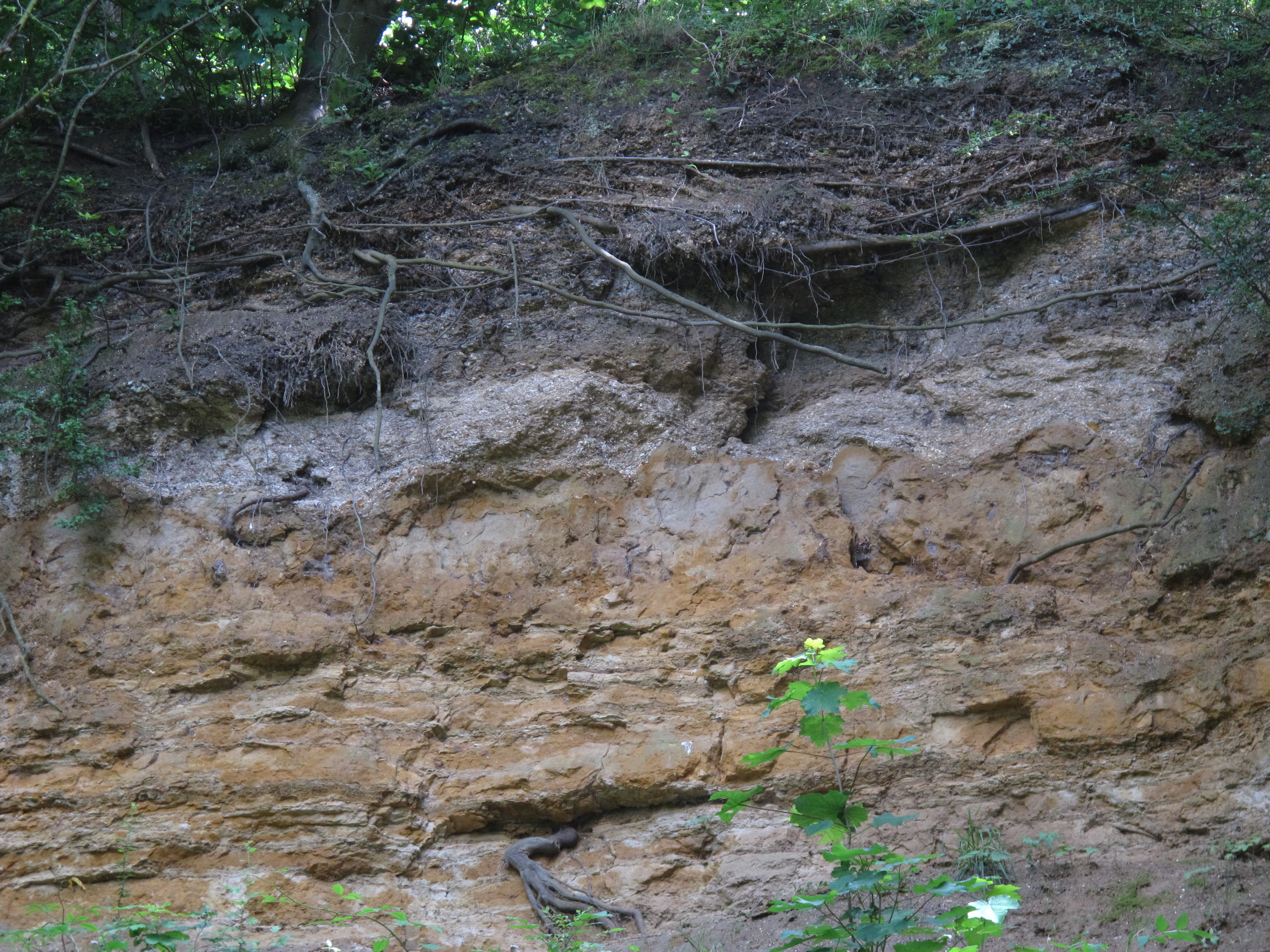
An exposed section of the Lambeth Group, in Woolwich. Dark grey clays and light grey shelly clays overlay the yellow-brown weathering sands of the Upnor Formation.

The chalk basin has been infilled with a sequence of clays and sands of the more recent Paleogene Period, then Neogene Period (1.6 to 66.4 million years old). Most significant is the stiff, grey-blue London Clay, a marine deposit which is well known for the fossils it contains and can be over 150 metres thick beneath the city. This supports most of the deep foundations and tunnels that exist under London.

Also in this area are the Lambeth Group (formerly known as the Woolwich and Reading Beds, though those beds have been recently deprecated in 1994 in favour of the Lambeth Group by the British Geological Survey to conform with new standards and to allow scope for more detailed subdivisions) and Thanet Sands. Most of these sand and clays were deposited 60-50 million years ago during the Eocene. Southern England at this time was covered by a warm tropical sea: this is shown by the fossil evidence. The sands contain animals that lived in both estuaries and freshwater. Some species burrowed into the underlying chalk.

== Quaternary Period ==
Above this is the subsoil which consists of deposits of gravel up to 10 metres deep. This was deposited during the last ice-age ½ million years ago when the River Thames was diverted to its present position. While establishing its new path, the river eroded its valley, creating a series of sand and gravel terraces. These terraces are named after the area they are best known in, for example: Dartford Heath Gravel, Swanscombe, Orsett Heath, Corbets Tey, Mucking, West Thurrock, Kempton Park, Shepperton, Staines and Tilbury Gravels.

The sand and gravel terraces are made up of pebbles with flint, quartz and quartzite. In places, there are deposits of brickearth, which is a mixture of clay and sand that has supported London's long-standing brick-making industry. On top of these natural layers are the deposits of hundreds of years of human occupation. In the oldest parts the City of London and the City of Westminster this layer can be up to 6 metres deep.

== See also ==
- Geology of the United Kingdom
- Geology of England
- Ancestral Thames
