= Hertfordshire puddingstone =

Conglomerate sedimentary rock

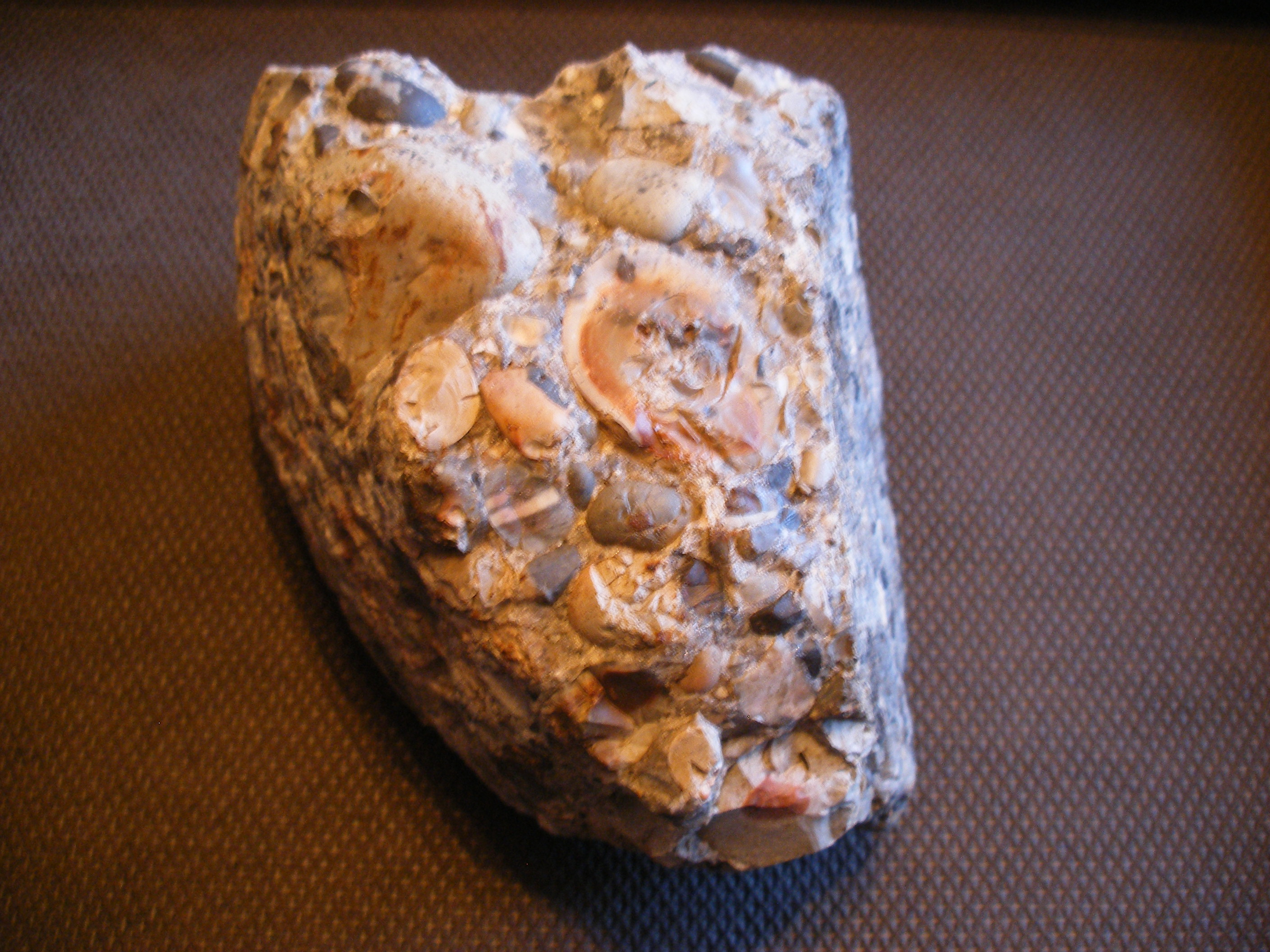
A fragment from a quern of probable Roman date made from Hertfordshire puddingstone. This unusual conglomerate rock consists of ovoid flint pebbles of various colours and sizes embedded in a tough silicified matrix.

Hertfordshire puddingstone is a conglomerate sedimentary rock composed of rounded flint pebbles cemented together by a younger matrix of silica quartz. The distinctive rock is largely confined to the English counties of Buckinghamshire and Hertfordshire but small amounts occur throughout the London Basin. It is quite commonly found in fields in and around Chesham, where pieces can be seen as boundary stones and in rockeries. Despite a superficial similarity to concrete, it is an entirely natural silcrete. A fracture runs across both the pebbles and the sandy matrix as both have equal strength unlike concrete where the pebbles remain whole and a fracture occurs only in the matrix. Like other puddingstones, it derives its name from the manner in which the embedded flints resemble the plums in a pudding. It forms the local base of the Upnor Formation of the Lambeth Group (lower Eocene, 56-55 million years ago).

== Geological origin ==
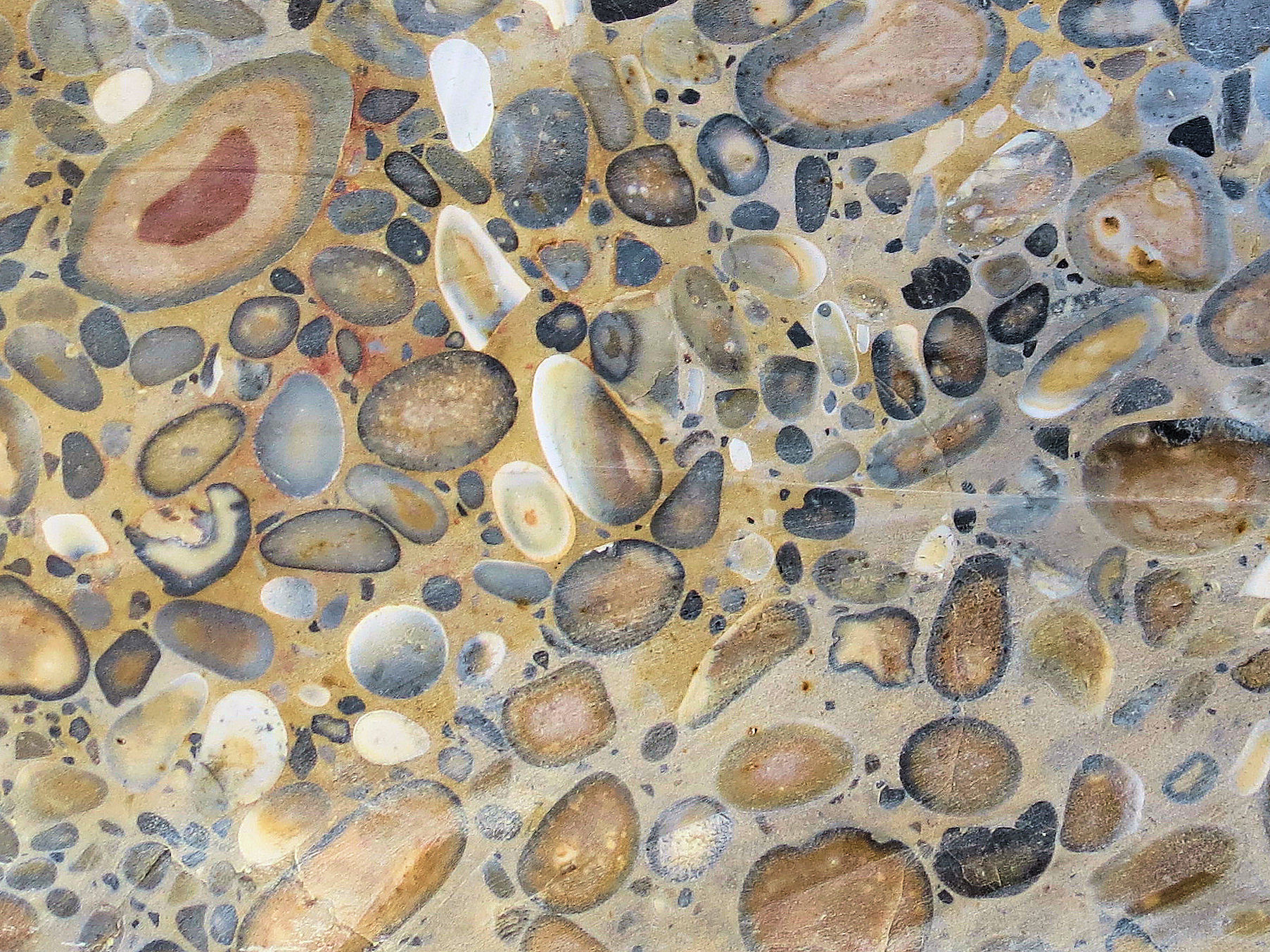
A polished section of Hertfordshire puddingstone

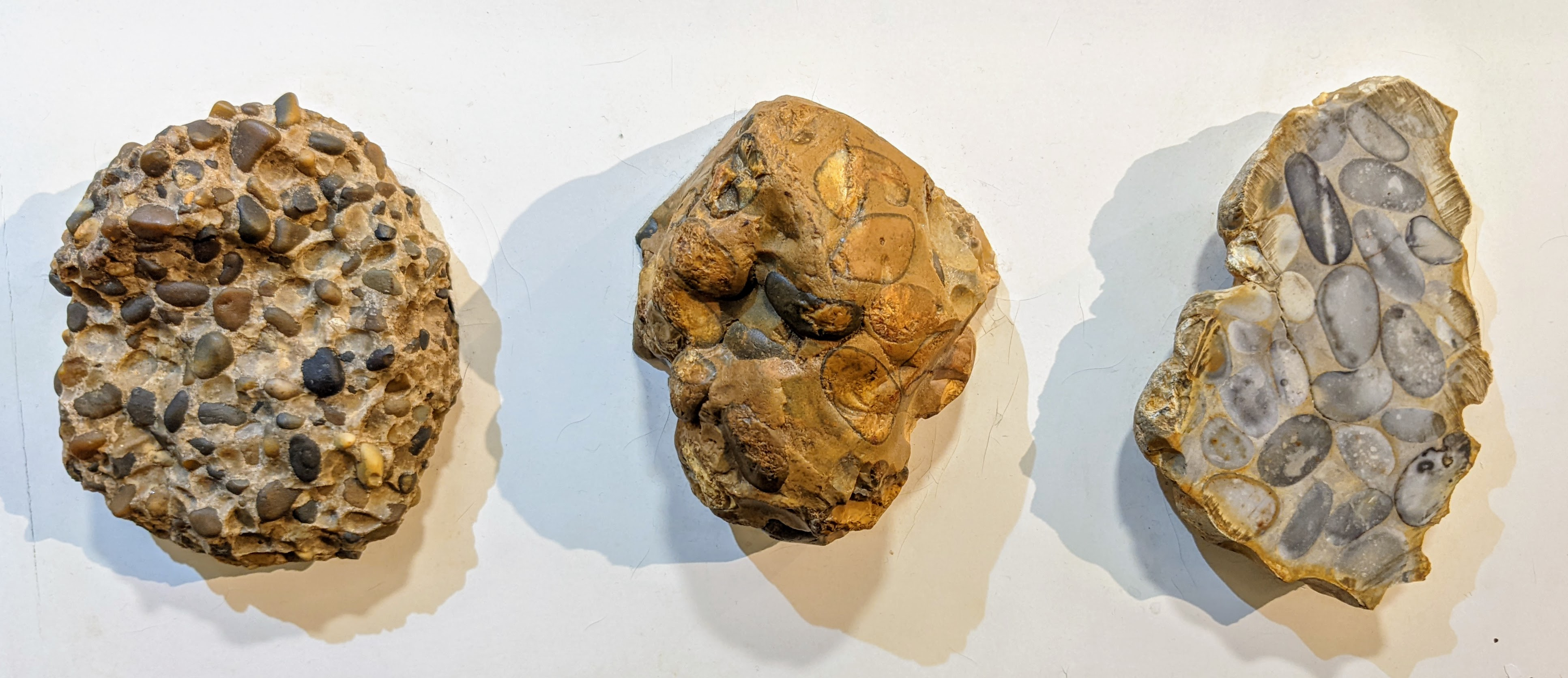
Samples of Hertfordshire puddingstone at Hertford Museum

The flints were eroded from the surrounding chalk beds some 56 million years ago in the Eocene epoch and were transported by water action to beaches, where they were rounded by wave erosion and graded by size. A lowering of sea levels and general drying during a brief arid period known as the Paleocene–Eocene Thermal Maximum drew out silica from surrounding rocks into the water immersing the flint pebbles. Further drying precipitated the silica which hardened around the pebbles, trapping them in the matrix.

Puddingstone is rarely found in situ in the strata but its hardness has preserved loose rocks and boulders commonly found in river beds, and less frequently exposed at the surface. A well-researched outcrop lies at Colliers End near Ware. Another large piece lies at the bottom of the trout lake in Fisheries Road, Hemel Hempstead. This was discovered by contractors deepening the lake in 1975. It is 30 ft x 20 ft by 3–4 feet thick.

Oxides of iron were also trapped in the silica matrix, giving rise to many different hues when the puddingstone is examined closely. From a greater distance, puddingstone is generally brown or ginger in colour, although pink is possible. The density of flint inclusions shows notable variation between specimens.

Rock similar to the sand matrix of Hertfordshire Puddingstone, and with similar silica cement, but lacking the pebbles, occurs further west in Southern England, and is called Sarsen stone. Most of the stones at Stonehenge and Avebury are sarsens.

== Uses ==
The silica is very hard, providing the stone with a variety of applications. Large pieces of puddingstone are found at the base of the walls of St Mary's Church, Chesham. It has also been used as an auxiliary building material supplementing flintstone buildings such as St Mary's Church, Stocking Pelham, St Lawrence's Church, Bovingdon, and the parish church at Sarratt; as a decorative feature or waymark in Hertfordshire villages, such as at Watton-at-Stone; or, during Roman times, for grinding corn. A fragment of a quern-stone made from puddingstone was found by archaeologist Dominic Shelley on the site of a Romano-British farmstead in Great Eversden, Cambridgeshire. Some puddingstones are used as landmarks on greens and commons such as at The Lee, Ashley Green and Cholesbury near Chesham and at Sarratt, Herts.

== In folklore ==
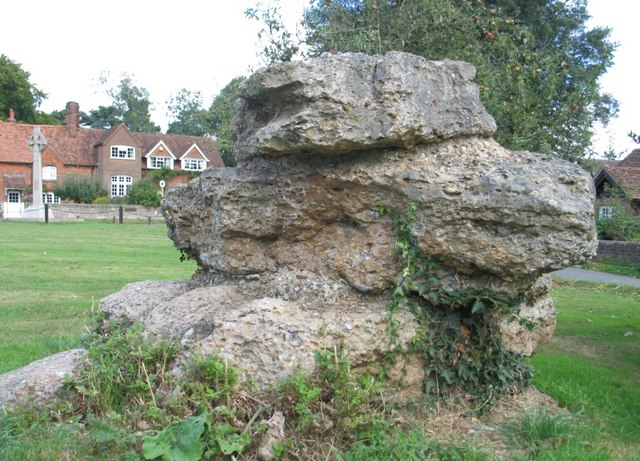
Hertfordshire puddingstone outside the Cock and Rabbit public house at The Lee, near Chesham

Hertfordshire puddingstone was credited in local folklore with several supernatural powers, including being a protective charm against witchcraft. Parish records from the village of Aldenham relate that in 1662 a woman suspected of having been a witch was buried with a piece of it laid on top of her coffin to prevent her from escaping after burial. In living memory a piece of puddingstone was given to a bride and groom, possibly as a fertility symbol. Its supposed magical powers gave it the names of woe stone.It was also called grow stone or breeding stone because of a related belief that it could multiply itself. In Chesham, they were known as everlasting stones.

== See also ==
- Geology of Hertfordshire – Geology of English county
- Roxbury puddingstone – Rock formation in Massachusetts, United States
