= Balder Formation =

Geological formation in Europe

- Stratigraphic range: Earliest Eocene; ~55–52 Ma
- Type: Formation
- Unit of: Moray Group
- Underlies: Horda, Mousa or Tay Formation
- Overlies: Sele or Dornoch Formation, Montrose Group
- Thickness: 30–300 m (98–984 ft)

Lithology
- Primary: Mudstone, tuff
- Other: Sandstone

Location
- Region: Offshore; subsurface
- Country: United Kingdom; Norway; Denmark
- Extent: Central and northern North Sea, Faroe-Shetland Basin

Type section
- Named for: Balder, Norse deity

The Balder Formation is a geological formation of lowermost Eocene in age, found in the Central and Northern North Sea and Faroe-Shetland Basin. The formation is named after Balder, a god from Norse mythology. Layers of tuff are found, particularly at the base of the unit, deposited by airfall from volcanoes associated with the North Atlantic Igneous Province.
