= Moray Group =

Stratigraphic group in the Faroe-Shetland Basin

- Stratigraphic range: Paleocene to Eocene
- Type: Group
- Sub-units: Dornoch Formation, Sele Formation & Balder Formation
- Underlies: Stronsay Group
- Overlies: Montrose Group
- Thickness: <30 m up to 500 m

Lithology
- Primary: mudstone, siltstone
- Other: sandstone, lignite, tuff

Location
- Region: North Sea and Faroe-Shetland Basin
- Country: United Kingdom

Type section
- Named for: Moray Firth

The Moray Group is a stratigraphic group, a set of geological rock strata of Paleocene to Eocene age, found beneath the North Sea and in the Faroe-Shetland Basin. Two sequences are recognised, a shelf succession consisting of sandstones and siltstones of the Dornoch Formation and a thicker basinal succession consisting of mainly mudstones of the Sele Formation and the Balder Formation.
