= Sudbourne Park Pit =

Protected area in Suffolk, England

Coordinates: 52.108°N 1.514°E

- Site of Special Scientific Interest
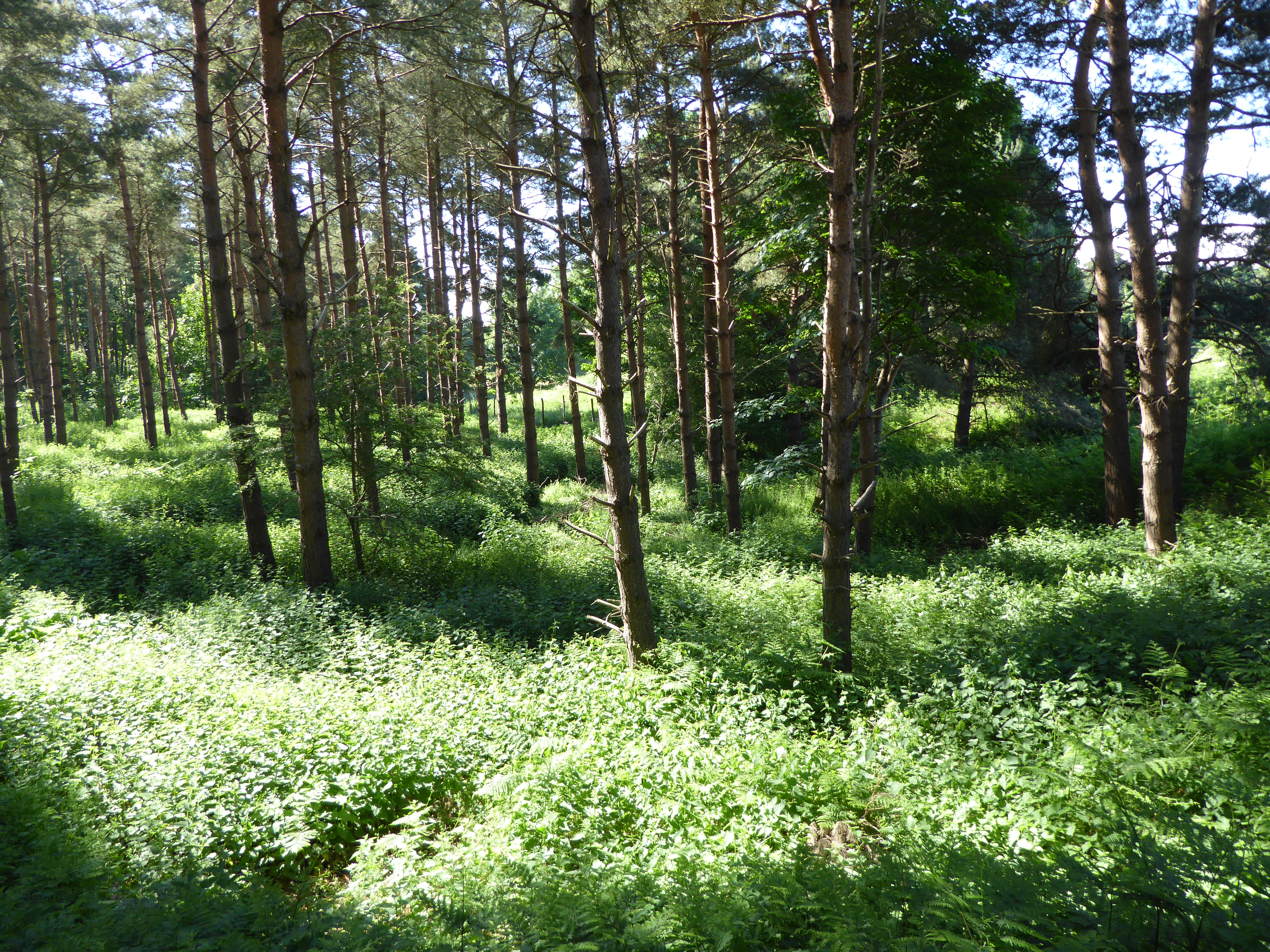
- Location of Sudbourne Park Pit.
- Area of search: Suffolk
- Grid reference: TM 407 513
- Interest: Geological
- Area: 1.1 hectares
- Notification date: 1985
- Location map: Magic Map

Sudbourne Park Pit is a 1.1-hectare (2.7-acre) geological Site of Special Scientific Interest between Orford and Chillesford in Suffolk. It is a Geological Conservation Review site, and it is in the Suffolk Coast and Heaths Area of Outstanding Natural Beauty.

This is described by Natural England as an important site for the study of the fauna of the Coralline Crag Formation, dating to the early Pliocene, around five million years ago. The fossils are plentiful and diverse, especially bivalves and molluscs.

There is access from a footpath between Chillesford and Orford.
