= Geology of the Broads =

This article describes the geology of the Broads, an area of East Anglia in eastern England characterised by rivers, marshes and shallow lakes ('broads'). The Broads is designated as a protected landscape with 'status equivalent to a national park'.

The area is underlain by a suite of generally flat-lying sedimentary rock types of which the most recent are those of Neogene age. Almost entirely covered by more recent superficial deposits, they are exposed at the surface to a very limited extent or else are known from boreholes or quarry workings. Overlying these across much the larger part of the Broads are silts and clays of Flandrian age, which together with peat deposits form the broad flats of the Waveney, Yare, Bure and Thurne valleys. Extraction of the peat in historic times, and subsequent flooding of the workings, has resulted in the pattern of broads for which the area is widely known.

== Older subsurface rocks ==
Borehole, seismic and other geophysical survey evidence suggest that the entire region is underlain at depth by rocks of Silurian age though these do not occur at or near the surface. Much of this region of England is believed to have been emergent i.e. above sea level, during most of the succeeding Devonian period and through the Carboniferous, Permian and Triassic periods. Rocks of this age are therefore absent or restricted in occurrence in the region and are unknown beneath the Broads. Rocks of Jurassic age are known from other parts of East Anglia but again are not known to underlie the Broads.

== Cretaceous ==
In common with most of the rest of East Anglia, the Broads are underlain by Cretaceous age rocks of the Chalk Group, though these are in turn overlain by younger rocks across the larger part of the area. Only west of Wroxham and Hoveton in the Bure valley and west of Brundall in the Yare valley is chalk present immediately beneath superficial deposits.

There are some very restricted outcrops of the Upper Chalk in the valley sides between Wroxham and Coltishall, some of which like those around Coltishall Hall have been worked. The Upper Chalk also outcrops northwest of Bramerton and west from Postwick into Norwich on either side of the Yare valley.

== Palaeogene ==
A small outlier of the London Clay is known to exist beneath Langley and Hardley Marshes where a buried valley lies at depth beneath the shallow modern day valley of the Yare. This geological formation dates from the Lower Eocene epoch of the Palaeogene period.

== Neogene ==
The youngest "solid" rocks of the area are those of the Crag Group which are of Neogene to early Quaternary age. They comprise marine and estuarine sands and other sediments. These and more recent superficial deposits (described below) are all recognised formally as parts of the Great Britain Superficial Deposits Supergroup.

== Quaternary ==
During the early and middle Pleistocene, a major river now referred to as the Bytham River flowed from west to east through the area on the approximate line of the modern Waveney. It left a series of river terrace deposits, evident west of Geldeston for example, whose colours betray the origin of their materials in the English Midlands. Some of these sands and gravels have been worked in the past at places such as Kirby Cane, just outside the 'national park'.

Sediments associated with the Anglian glaciation are collectively termed the Albion Glacigenic Group, having formerly gone under other names. Amongst these the Lowestoft Formation (formerly known by various names: Lowestoft Boulder Clay, Cromer Till (in part), Lowestoft Till Group, Lowestoft Till Formation) comprises deposits of glacial origin along with the Aldeby sands and gravels. Likewise the Happisburgh Glacigenic Formation is a modern name for an assemblage of sediments including the former Corton Formation and a part of the Cromer Till. The tract of country around Lowestoft, Belton and Blundeston is formed by sands, along with sandy clays and gravels, formerly assigned to the Corton Formation. This is overlain in many places by the Corton Woods sands and gravels which are of glaciofluvial origin. The national park boundaries encompass the margins of this tract and hence of these sediments.

The silts and clays of Flandrian age together with peat deposits forming the broad flats of the various river valleys are collectively assigned the name of the Breydon Formation.

== See also ==
- Geology of Norfolk
- Geology of Suffolk
