= Red House Farm Pit =

Protected area in Suffolk, England

Coordinates: 52.137°N 1.557°E

- Site of Special Scientific Interest
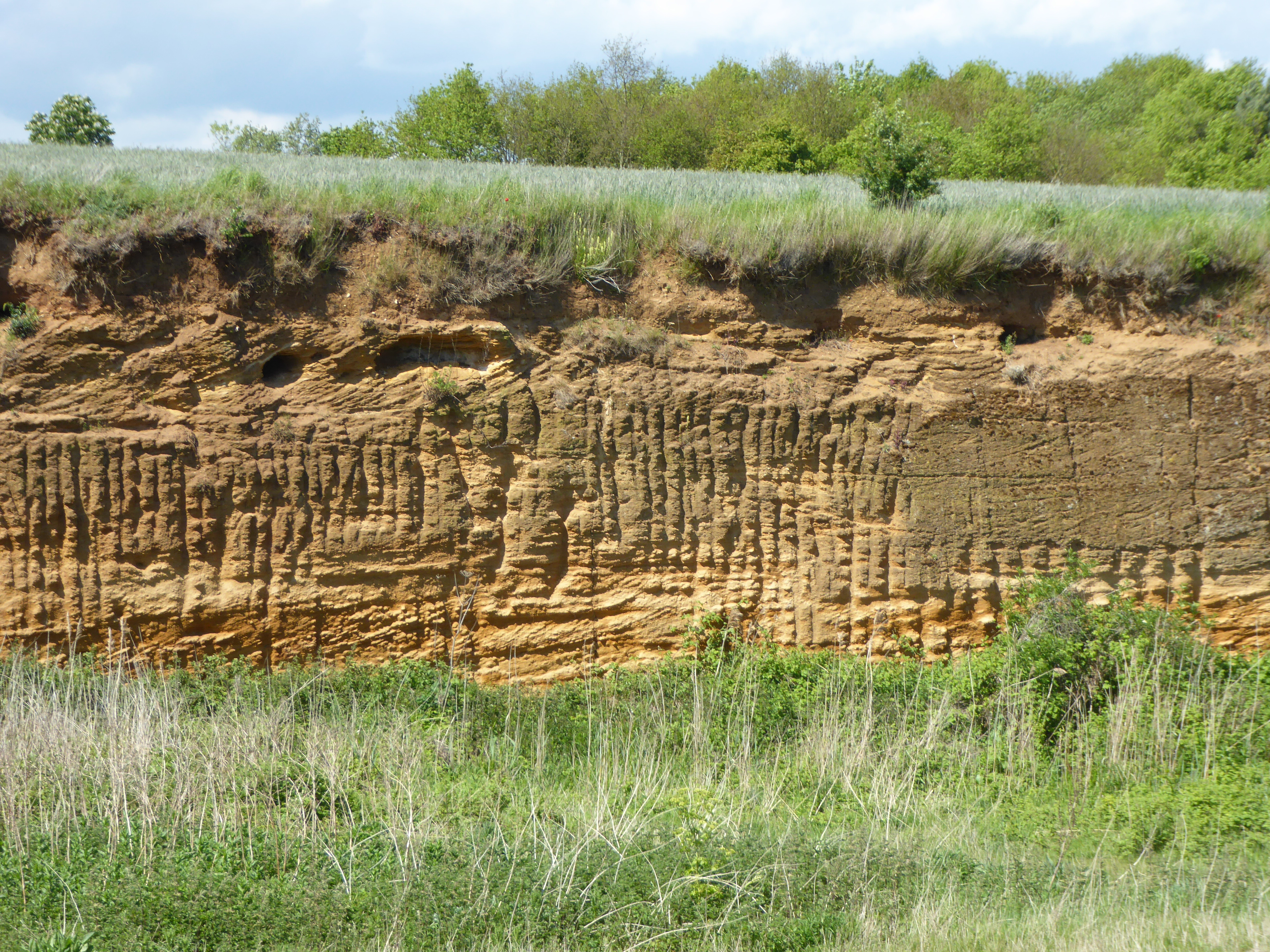
- Location of Red House Farm Pit.
- Area of search: Suffolk
- Grid reference: TM 435 547
- Interest: Geological
- Area: 0.5 hectares
- Notification date: 1985
- Location map: Magic Map

Red House Farm Pit is a 0.5-hectare (1.2-acre) geological Site of Special Scientific Interest east of Wickham Market in Suffolk. It is a Geological Conservation Review site, and in the Suffolk Coast and Heaths Area of Outstanding Natural Beauty.

This pit exposes a 3.5 metres (11 feet) section of the sandwave facies of the Pliocene Coralline Crag Formation. It has many bryozoan fossils.

There is access to the site by a track from Lambert's Lane.
