= Valley Farm Pit, Sudbourne =

Protected area in Suffolk, England

Coordinates: 52.122°N 1.556°E

- Site of Special Scientific Interest
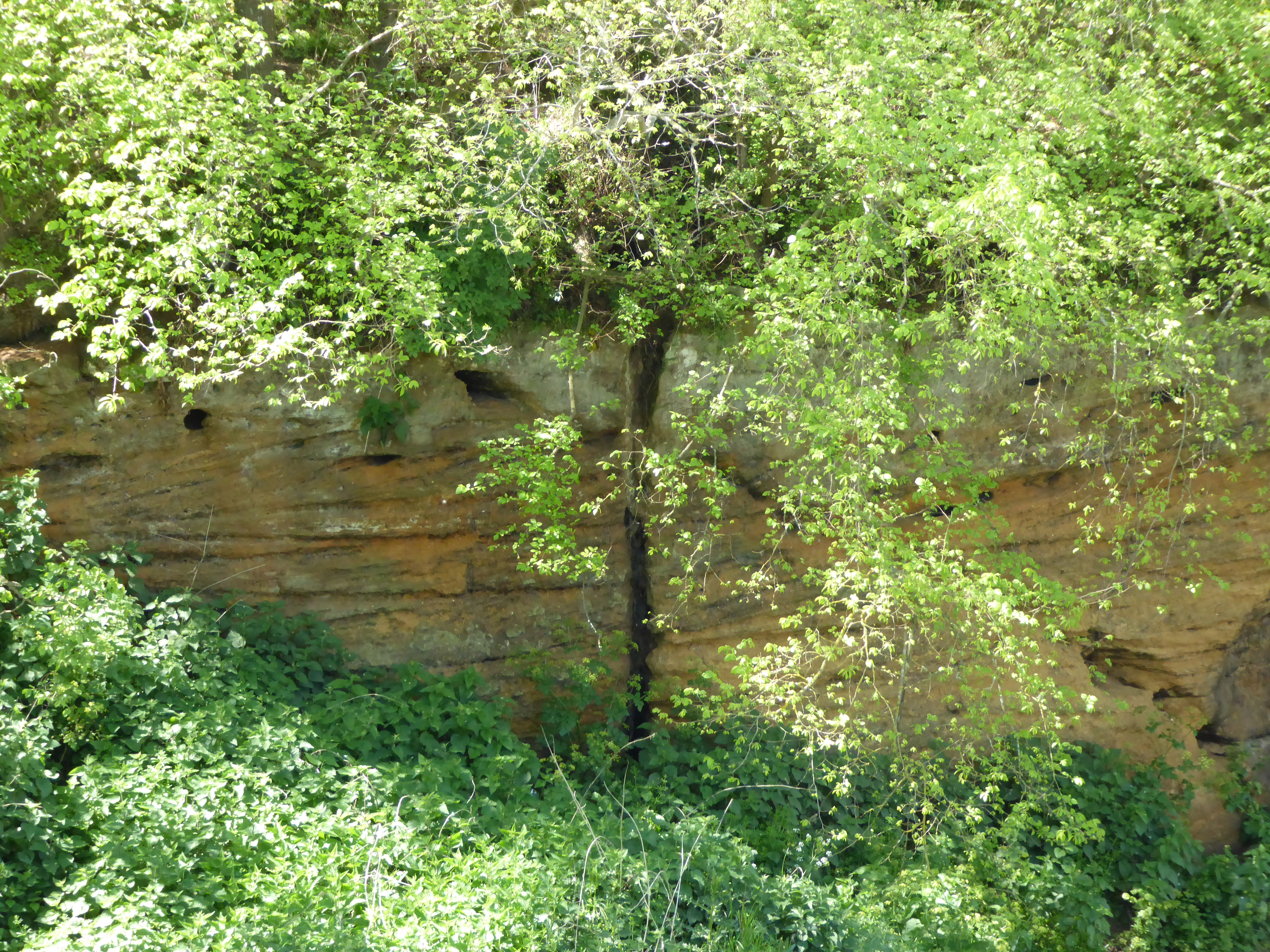
- Location of Valley Farm Pit, Sudbourne.
- Area of search: Suffolk
- Grid reference: TM 435 530
- Interest: Geological
- Area: 0.5 hectares
- Notification date: 1986
- Location map: Magic Map

Valley Farm Pit, Sudbourne is a 0.5-hectare (1.2-acre) geological Site of Special Scientific Interest north of Orford in Suffolk. It is a Geological Conservation Review site, and in the Suffolk Coast and Heaths Area of Outstanding Natural Beauty.

A shelly, fossilerous Pleistocene layer lies unconformably above a Pliocene Coralline Crag Formation layer. It is described by Natural England as important both for sedimentological studies and for understanding the local relationship between the Pliocene and the Pleistocene.

The site is private land with no public access.
