= Geology of Norfolk =

Geology of English county

The geology of Norfolk in eastern England largely consists of late Mesozoic and Cenozoic sedimentary rocks of marine origin covered by an extensive spread of unconsolidated recent deposits.

== Jurassic ==
The oldest rocks at or near the surface in Norfolk are late Jurassic mudstones and muddy limestones which underlie recent deposits in the area west of King's Lynn and Downham Market.

== Cretaceous ==
Overlying the Jurassic is a Cretaceous sequence whose lowermost unit is the Wealden Group comprising mudstones, limestones, siltstones and sandstones and which extends in a band from Hunstanton southwards to south of the village of Southery. A narrow band of sandstone immediately east of this constitutes the Lower Greensand Group and beyond this, and stratigraphically above it, lie the mudstones and sandstones of the Gault and Upper Greensand formations.

The Grey Chalk and the White Chalk subgroups and the Hunstanton Formation overlie the Greensand. The Chalk extends across the rest of Norfolk east of a wavering line from Holme-next-the-Sea on the north coast to Hockwold cum Wilton on the Suffolk border though it is concealed beneath later Neogene sediments in the east.

== Palaeogene ==
The Palaeogene Period is represented by a small area of Eocene clay assigned to the Thames Group which is recorded in the vicinity of Loddon.

== Neogene ==
The shelly sand, clay and gravel deposits known locally as 'crag' cover the eastern part of the county. The western 'feather edge' of the crag is mapped south from the coast west of Sheringham through Cawston and Norwich to the Suffolk border east of Diss. The sequence is divided into the Red Crag, Norwich Crag and Wroxham Crag formations. Some of the youngest rocks in Britain, these are of Pliocene to Pleistocene age.

== Structure ==
A granite pluton associated with the Acadian orogeny is inferred to exist beneath central and western Norfolk.

== Quaternary ==
The larger part of Norfolk's bedrock geology is concealed beneath superficial deposits, the oldest of which is a spread of glacial till dating from the Anglian glaciation. Interspersed with the till are sheets of glacial sands and gravels. The fact that the Chalk scarp in East Anglia is much reduced in height compared to its outcrop in Lincolnshire and the Chiltern Hills has been put down to erosion by the Anglian icesheet which reached as far south as Essex. The late Devensian glaciation resulted in the North Sea icesheet impinging upon the north coast of Norfolk. Of more recent origin are alluvial deposits which extend across the floors of the main river valleys and widely across the flats of the Broads. Coastal alluvium is also present along the north coast from Holme-next-the-Sea to Brancaster. River terrace deposits occur in places, for example around the valley of the River Waveney. Blown sand characterises the lower sections of coast. Peat is widespread in the fenland areas south and west of Downham Market.

== See also ==
- Geology of the United Kingdom
- Geology of England
- Geology of the Broads
