= Woolwich Formation =

Geologic formation in England

- Stratigraphic range: Paleogene
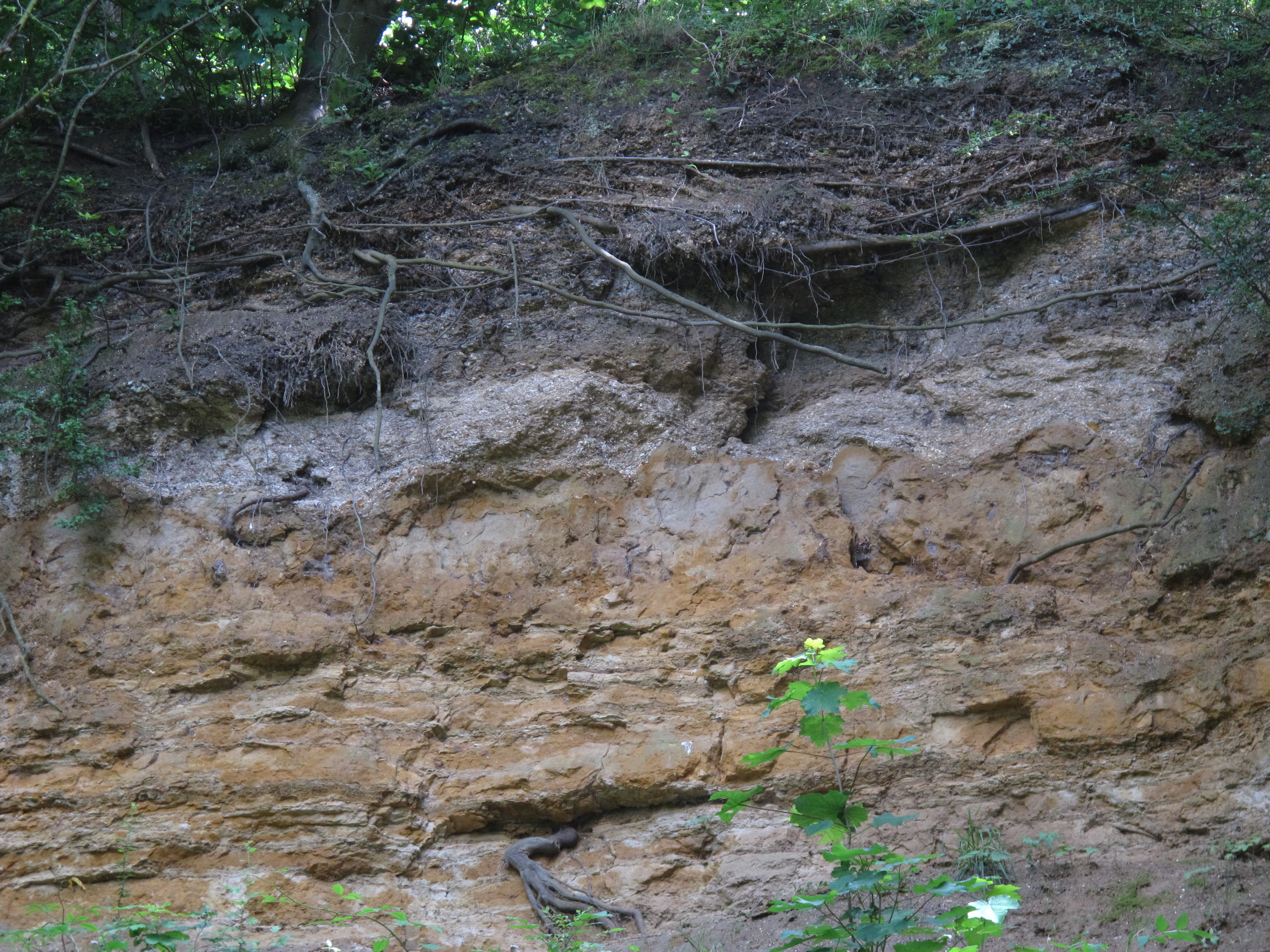
- Exposure in Gilbert's Pit. Dark grey clays, and light grey shelly clays of the Woolwich Formation, overlying the Upnor Formation sands
- Type: Formation
- Unit of: Lambeth Group
- Underlies: Harwich Formation of the Thames Group
- Overlies: Upnor Formation
- Thickness: max 14.5 m

Lithology
- Primary: claystone, sandstone
- Other: lignite

Location
- Region: England
- Country: United Kingdom
- Extent: London and northern Kent

Type section
- Named for: Gilbert's Pit, Charlton

The Woolwich Formation is a geological formation in southeast England. It preserves fossils dating back to the Paleogene period.

== See also ==
- List of fossiliferous stratigraphic units in England
