= Upnor Formation =

Geological formation in Kent, England

- Stratigraphic range: Thanetian; ~58.7–55.8 Ma
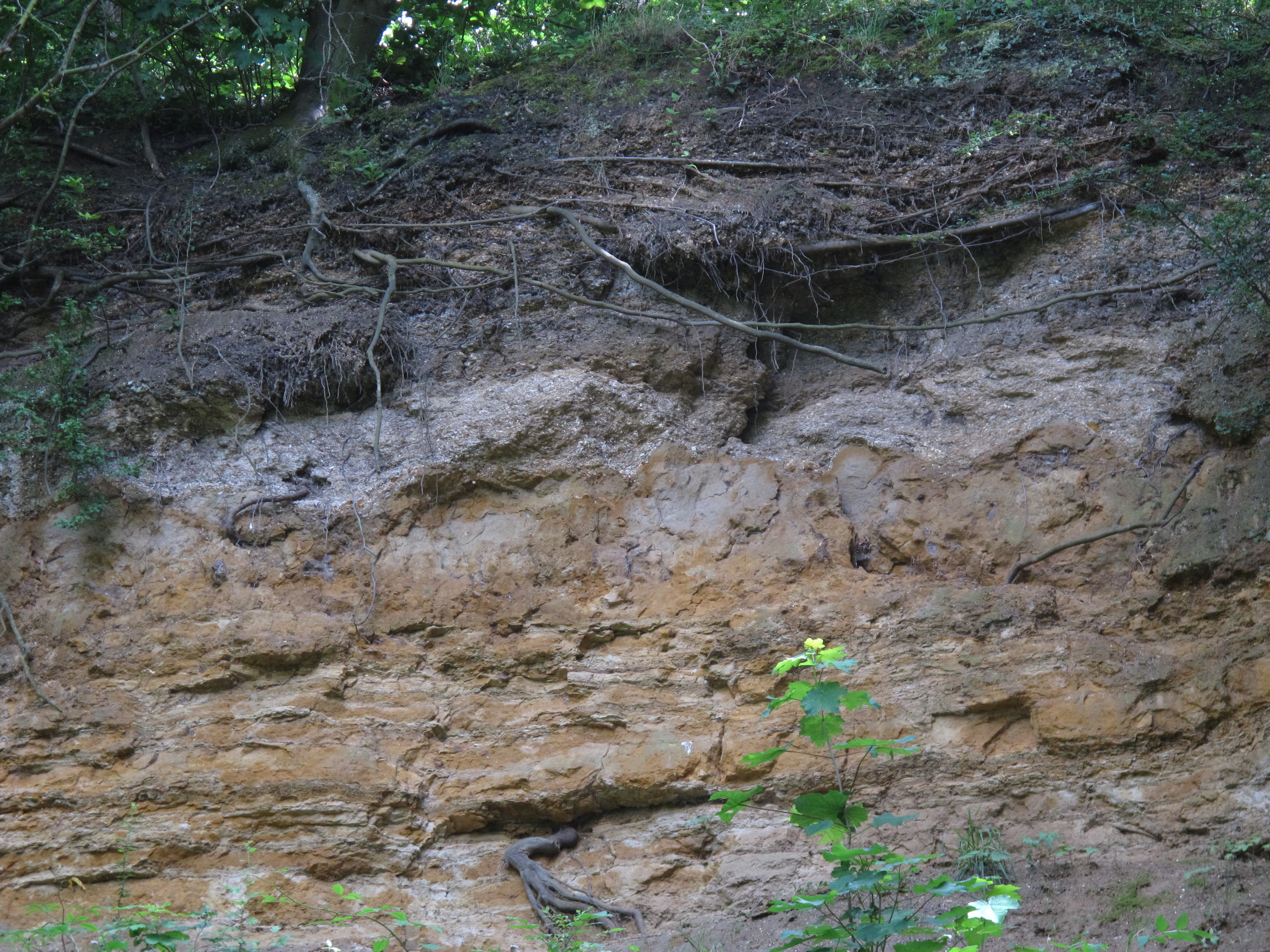
- Exposure in Gilbert's Pit. Dark grey clays, and light grey shelly clays of the Woolwich Formation overlying yellow-brown weathering sands of the Upnor Formation
- Type: Formation
- Unit of: Lambeth Group
- Sub-units: Beltinge Fish Bed
- Underlies: Reading Formation, Woolwich Formation
- Overlies: Thanet Sand, Chalk Group
- Thickness: <2–15 m (6.6–49.2 ft)

Lithology
- Primary: Sandstone

Location
- Coordinates: 51.4°N 1.1°E
- Approximate paleocoordinates: 45.9°N 1.0°W
- Region: southern England
- Country: United Kingdom
- Extent: London Basin

Type section
- Named for: Upnor
- Upnor Formation (England)

The Upnor Formation is a geological formation found in the London Basin of southeastern England. It is of Thanetian (Upper Paleocene) age. It lies unconformably on the Thanet Formation for most of its outcrop, but in the west it lies directly on Chalk Group. It is generally overlain either by the Reading Formation or the Woolwich Formation, but locally in north and east Kent it is overlain unconformably by the Harwich Formation. It forms the lowermost part of the Lambeth Group. The type section is at Lower Upnor Pit, north Kent. The formation has provided fossils of the eutherian mammal Arctocyonides arenae.
