= Reading Formation =

Geologic formation in England

- Stratigraphic range: Paleocene
- Type: Formation
- Unit of: Lambeth Group
- Underlies: Harwich Formation
- Overlies: Upnor Formation (London Basin), Chalk Group (Hampshire Basin)
- Thickness: Up to 27 m, generally 12 to 16 m

Lithology
- Primary: Clay
- Other: Sand

Location
- Region: England
- Country: United Kingdom
- Extent: London Basin, Hampshire Basin

Type section
- Named for: Reading, Berkshire

The Reading Formation is a geologic formation in southern England. It dates to the Paleocene period, and is part of the Lambeth Group. It overlies the London Basin and is below the Harwich Formation. The formation is composed of "a series of lenticular mottled clays and sands, here and there with pebbly beds and masses of fine sand converted into quartzite. These beds are generally unfossiliferous."

== Clay sources ==
During the late medieval era, the Surrey whitewares pottery kilns were located near the Reading Formation, most notably the area between Farnham and Tongham The beds were an excellent source of white-firing clay.

== See also ==
- List of fossiliferous stratigraphic units in England
