= Funton =

City in Kent UK

Coordinates: 51°22′48″N 0°41′54″E

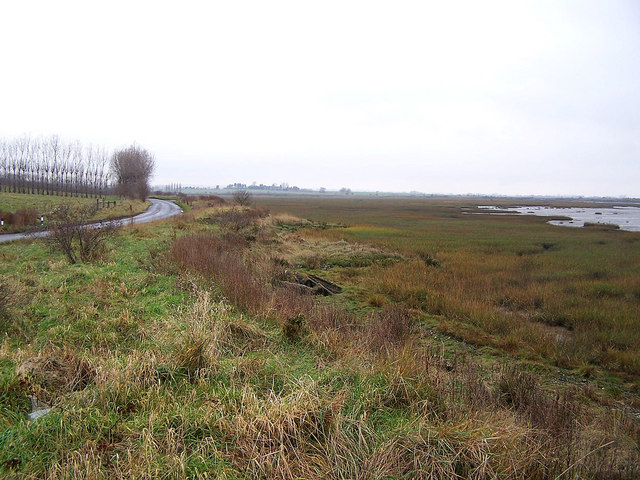
Shoreline of Funton Creek The road here can be flooded by the sea during exceptionally high tides

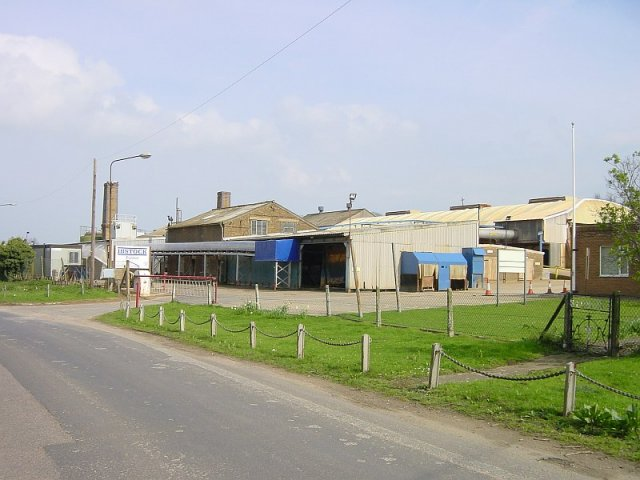
Funton brickworks

Funton is a location in Kent, United Kingdom. It is a creek situated on the edge of the North Kent Marshes on the right bank of the River Medway about halfway between the towns Chatham and Sheerness.

There is evidence of Celtic/Romano-British salt extraction here deduced from the excavated remains of an evaporating vessel.

Brick making continues here using the local Brickearth clay. A small brick works produces the classic, yellow London stock bricks for which this area is well known. The brick works closed in 2010.
