= Brickearth =

Soil type

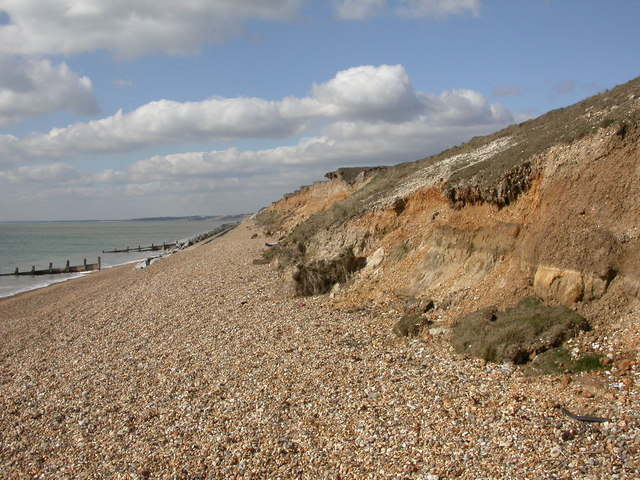
Brickearth deposits exposed as the topmost orange red layer in the cliff at Milford on Sea, Hampshire, UK

Brickearth is a term originally used to describe superficial windblown deposits found in southern England. The term has been employed in English-speaking regions to describe similar deposits.

Brickearths are periglacial loess, a wind-blown dust deposited under extremely cold, dry, peri- or postglacial conditions. The name arises from its early use in making house bricks, its composition being suitable for brick-making without additional material being added; unlike clay, its bricks can be hardened (fused) at lower temperatures, including in wood-fired kilns.

The brickearth is normally represented on 1:50,000 solid and drift edition geological maps. In the Thames valley, in broad patches brickearth overlies fluvial terrace gravel; it has been reclassified on later maps as the "Langley Silt Complex".

== Description ==
Brickearth is a superficial deposit of homogeneous loam or silt deposited during the Pleistocene geological period. Brickearth typically occurs in discontinuous spreads, across southern England and South Wales, south of a line from Pembroke in the west to Essex in the east in depths of up to a metre. Commercially useful deposits of about 2m to 4m thick are present in Kent, Hertfordshire and Hampshire, overlying chalk, Thanet Beds or London Clay. The original deposition of the sediments occurred under cold climates where fluvial out-wash sediments from glaciers were subject to windy dry periods. The exposed finer-grained sediments were picked up and transported by the wind and were deposited wherever the wind strength decreased.

There are extensive brickearth deposits in Kent, particularly on the North Downs dip slope and on the Hoo peninsula, sections of the Medway and Stour valleys. Its mineral content is critical to its applicability in brickmaking and requires precise proportions of chalk, clay, and iron.

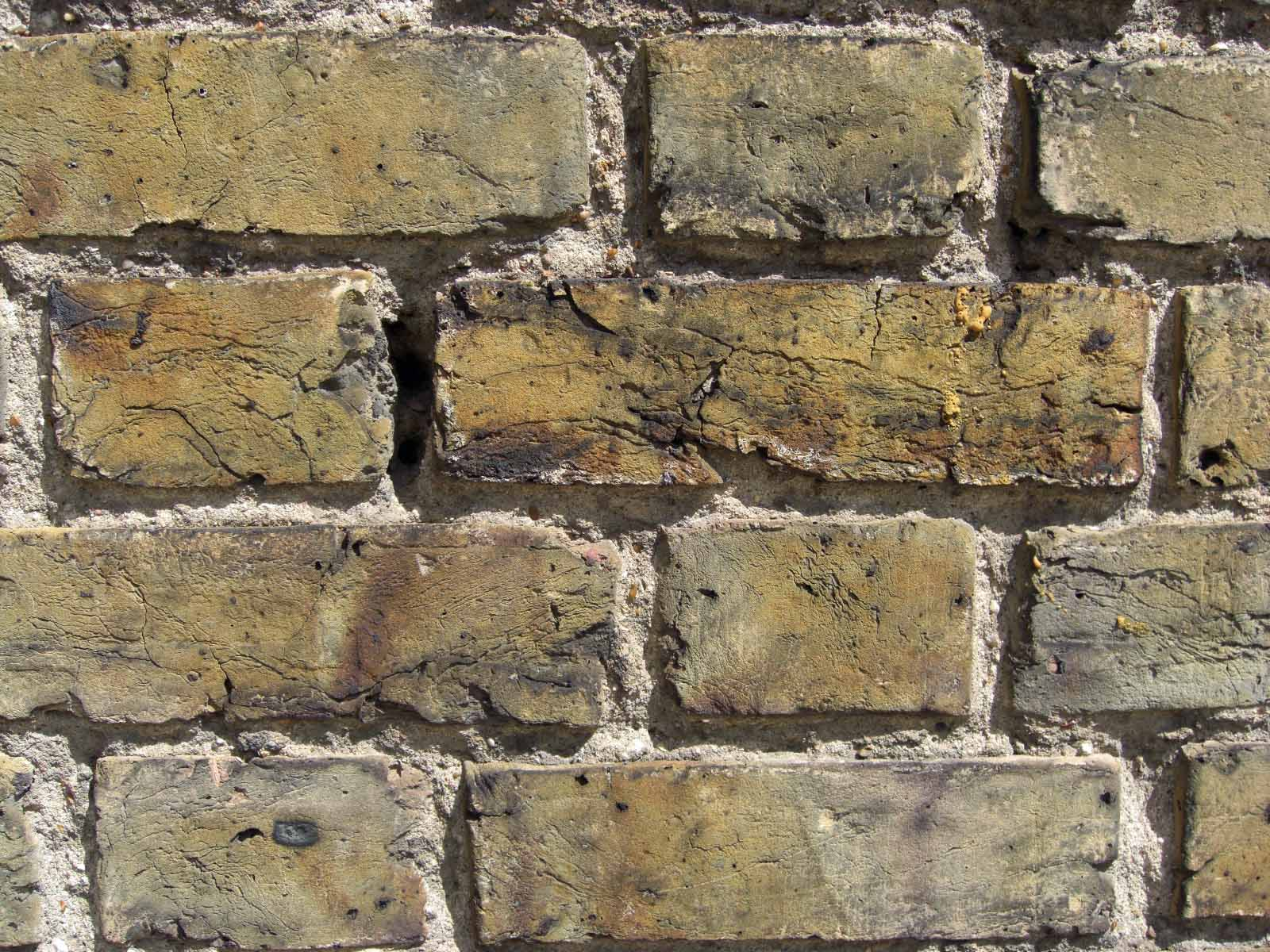
London stock bricks

Brickearth requires little or no admixture of other materials to render it suitable for the manufacture of 'stock bricks'. When used for brick making, it was often dug from small temporary holes and baked into bricks on the spot in brick clamps, and used for building nearby. The hole often remained and became a pond. In 1986, four active stock brick works were in Kent: at Otterham Quay, Funton, Murston and Ospringe.

The brickearth gives rise to rich and fertile soils which have been exploited for agriculture. It is prone to rapid 'collapse' settlement when saturated with water and does not provide a firm foundation for buildings.

In Chichester, the brickearth is a flint-rich brown silty clay up to five metres thick, which occurs on the coastal plain. The brickearth is unfossiliferous but occasionally yields man-made flint implements.
