= Geology of Suffolk =

Geology of English county

The geology of Suffolk in eastern England largely consists of a rolling chalk plain overlain in the east by Neogene clays, sands and gravels and isolated areas of Palaeocene sands. A variety of superficial deposits originating in the last couple of million years overlie this 'solid geology'.

== Cretaceous ==
The oldest rocks exposed at the surface in Suffolk are the mudstones and sandstones of the Gault and Upper Greensand formations which are to be found only in the extreme northwest of the county west of Lakenheath. Overlying these deposits and to their east are the rocks of the Chalk which are divided into the lower i.e. older Grey Chalk and the upper i.e. younger White Chalk.

== Palaeogene ==
There are isolated pockets of Palaeocene sands and clays north of Ipswich and between there and Sudbury to the west. The clays of the early Eocene Harwich Formation are widespread in the southeast of the county between Sudbury and Orford Ness.

== Neogene ==
From Bury St Edmunds and Sudbury eastwards the Chalk is overlain by an extensive spread of Pliocene to Pleistocene age 'crag' stretching to the North Sea coast. Slightly older deposits known as Corralline Crag occur in the vicinity of Aldeburgh and Orford.

== Quaternary ==
A veneer of glacial till is widespread across Suffolk, dating from the Anglian glaciation. Sands and gravels of uncertain origin are common in the river valleys and the coastal plain whilst river terrace deposits have been mapped along the valleys of the rivers Stour, Waveney and Gipping for instance. Estuarine and marine alluvium is spread across the eastern coastal zone whilst at the other side of the county areas of peat and lake clays, silts and sands occur.

== See also ==
- Geology of the United Kingdom
- Geology of England
- Geology of the Broads
