= Montrose Group =

- Stratigraphic range: Paleocene
- Type: Group
- Sub-units: Lista Formation, Maureen Formation & Thanet Formation
- Underlies: Moray Group (North Sea) Lambeth Group (SE England)
- Overlies: Chalk Group
- Thickness: up to 600 m (2,000 ft)

Lithology
- Primary: Clay
- Other: Silt, sand, marl

Location
- Region: North Sea and onshore southeastern England
- Country: United Kingdom

Type section
- Named for: Montrose, Angus

The Montrose Group is a stratigraphic group, a set of geological rock strata of Paleocene age, found beneath the North Sea and locally onshore in southeastern England. It was originally described from offshore exploration wells in the North Sea. The Thanet Formation in the London Basin has more recently been assigned to the group.
