= Coralline Crag Formation =

Geological formation in England

Coordinates: 52.12°N 1.53°E

- Stratigraphic range: Pliocene
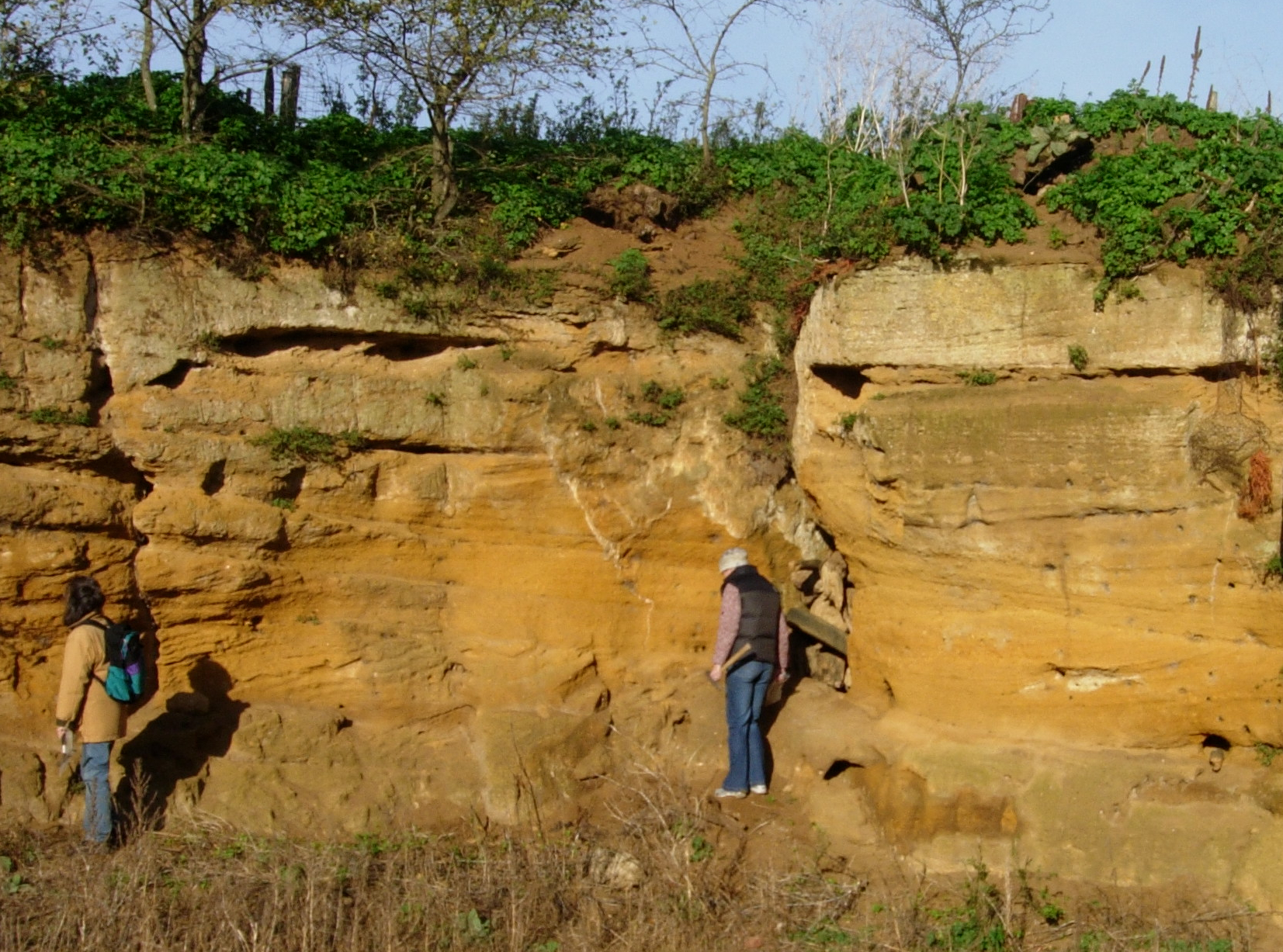
- Coralline Crag Formation exposed in Suffolk, England.
- Type: Formation
- Unit of: Crag Group
- Underlies: Norwich Crag Formation
- Overlies: Thames Group (unconformity)
- Thickness: Up to 25 metres

Lithology
- Primary: Sand

Location
- Region: England
- Country: United Kingdom
- Extent: Suffolk

The Coralline Crag Formation is a geological formation in England. It is a series of marine deposits found near the North Sea coast of Suffolk and characterised by bryozoan and mollusc debris. The deposit, whose onshore occurrence is mainly restricted to the area around Aldeburgh and Orford, is a series of bioclastic calcarenites and silty sands with shell debris, deposited during a short-lived warm period in the middle of the Pliocene Epoch of the Neogene Period. Small areas of the rock formation are found in locations such as Boyton and Tattingstone to the south of Orford as well as offshore at Sizewell.

Crag is a local word for a shelly sand. Coralline Crag has sometimes been used historically in the Suffolk coast area for building and a number of quarries exist. The tower of St Peter's Church in Chillesford is one of only two church towers in England built using the rock.

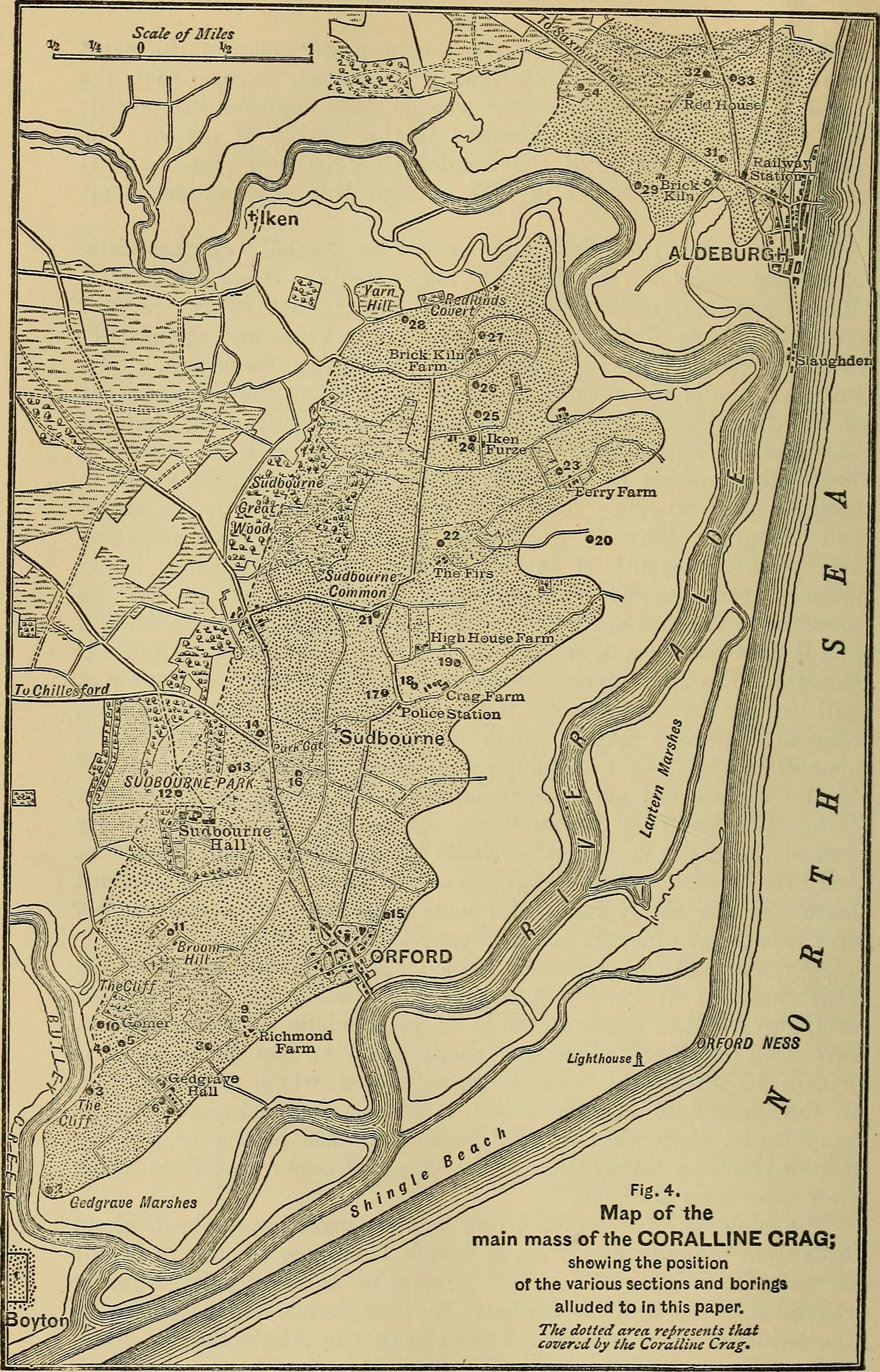
A map, published in 1898, showing the extent of Coralline Crag rocks in Suffolk

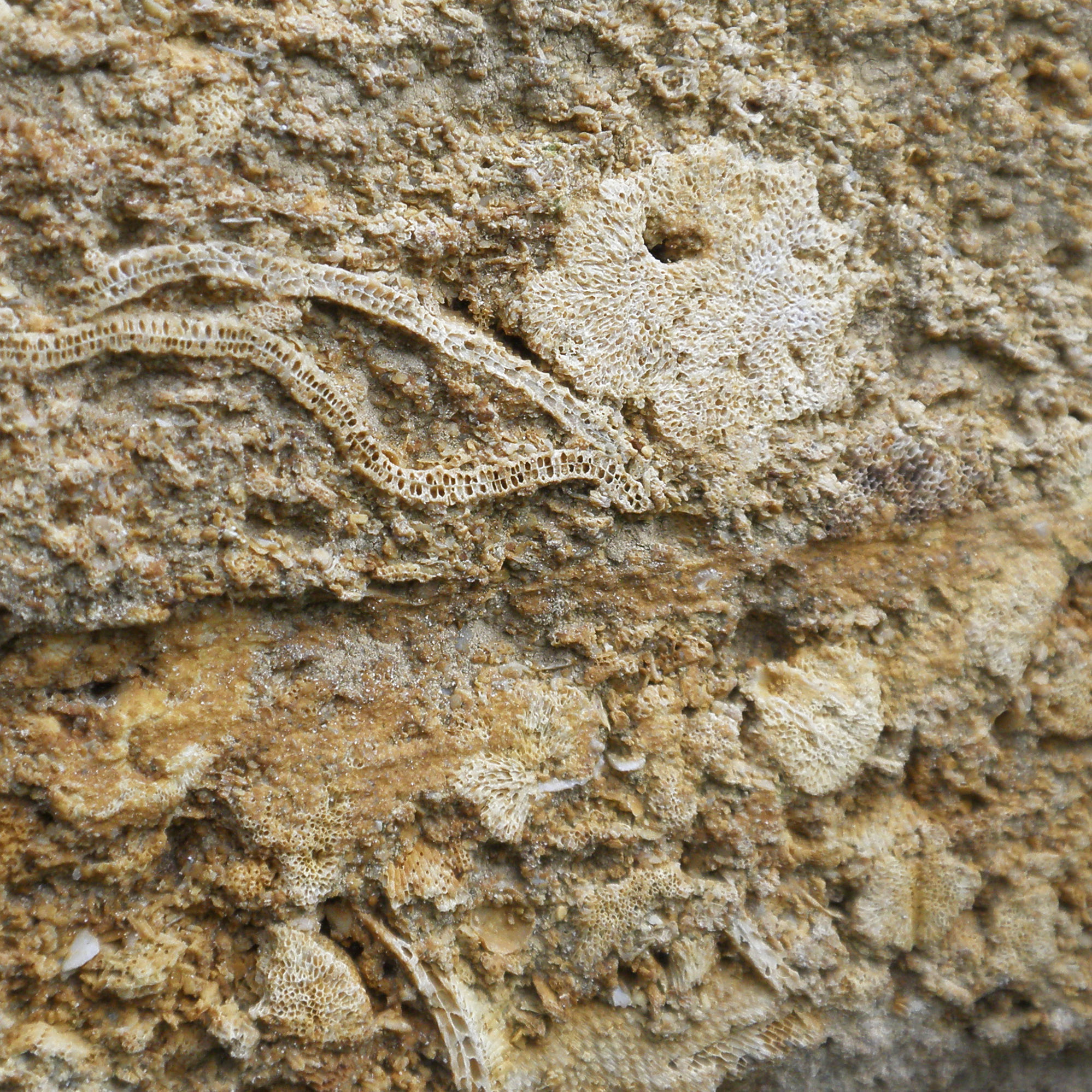
Quarried block of Coralline Crag, containing bryozoan fossils, in the wall of St Peter's church in Chillesford in Suffolk

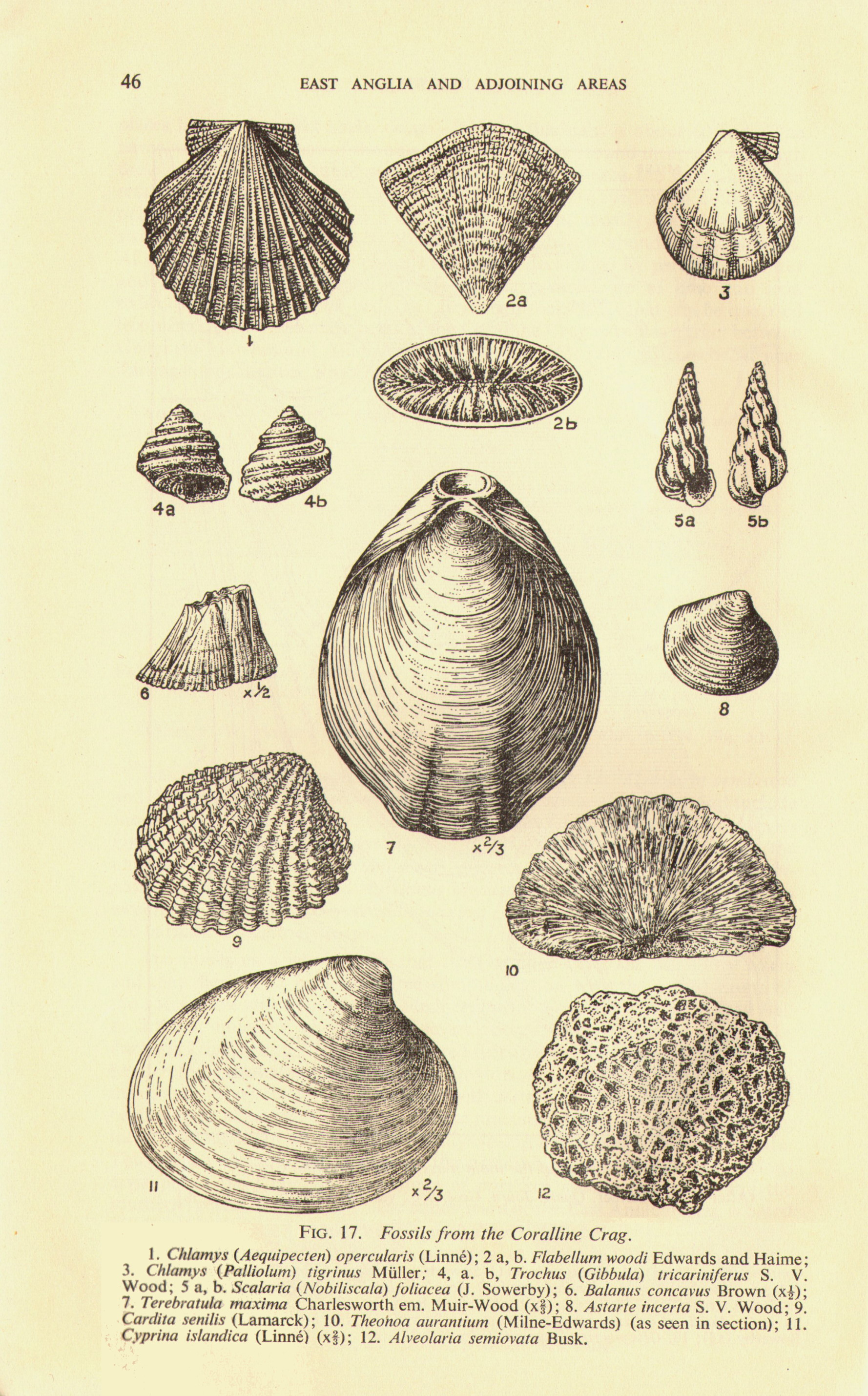
Fossils from the Coralline Crag. From Chatwin (1954).

== See also ==
- Geology of Suffolk
- List of fossiliferous stratigraphic units in England
