= Thames Group =

Geological formation in Great Britain

- Stratigraphic range: Eocene
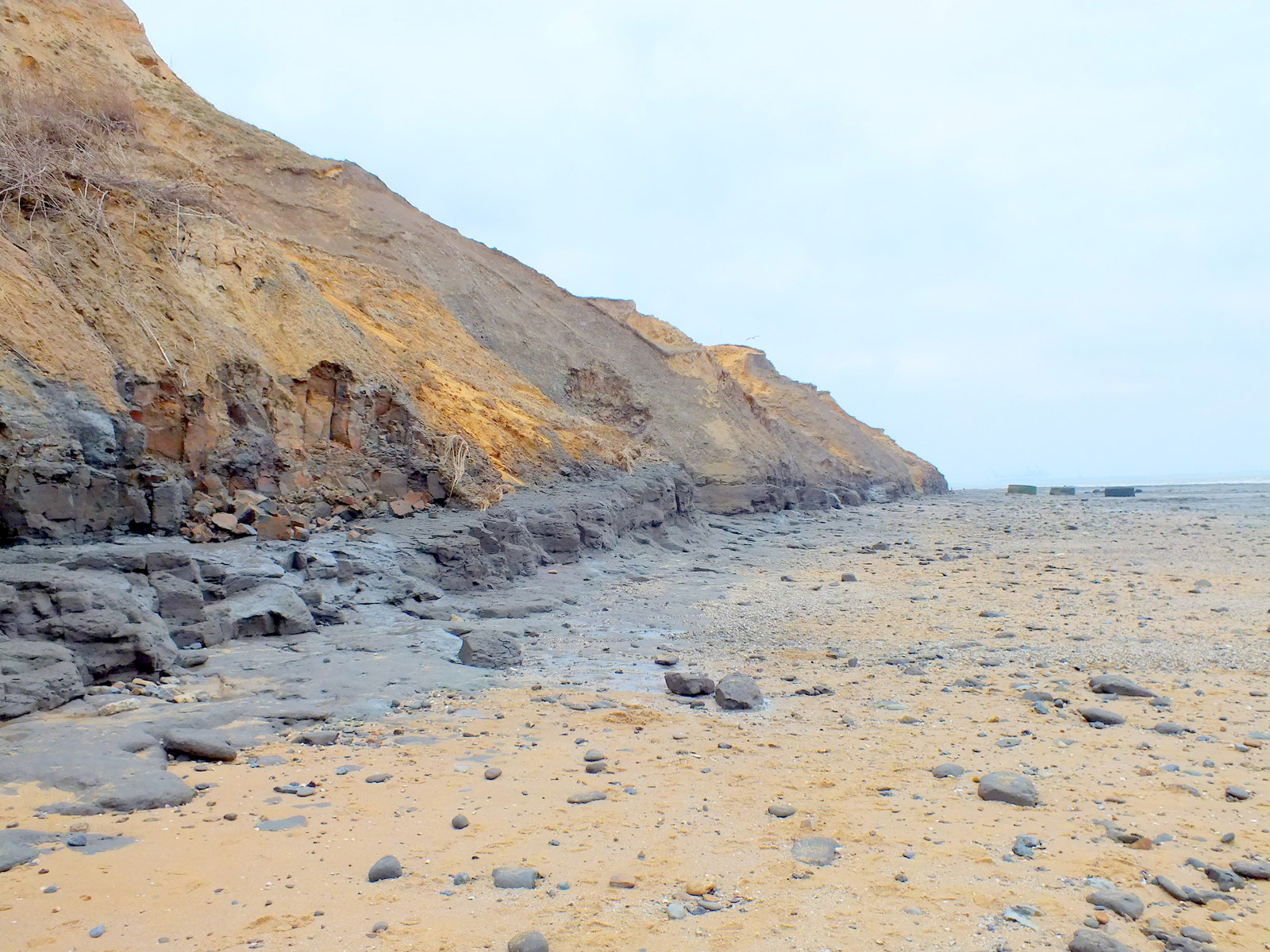
- London Clay Formation exposed at the base of the cliffs at Walton-on-the-Naze
- Type: Group
- Sub-units: Harwich Formation, London Clay Formation
- Underlies: Bracklesham Group
- Overlies: Oldhaven Formation or Lambeth Group
- Thickness: c110 - 115m in Hampshire Basin

Lithology
- Primary: mudstone
- Other: silty clay, sandy silt, sandy clayey silt

Location
- Country: England
- Extent: Hampshire Basin, London Basin

Type section
- Named for: River Thames

The Thames Group is an Eocene lithostratigraphic group (a sequence of rock strata) which is widespread in southeast England, especially in the Hampshire Basin from Dorset through Hampshire to West Sussex and in the Isle of Wight and in the London Basin from Berkshire east through northern Hampshire, Surrey and Greater London to Essex and north Kent. It is encountered in older literature as the London Clay Group.

== Stratigraphy ==
The London Clay Formation is the uppermost sub-unit of the Group. It is overlain by the lowermost units of the Bracklesham Group; these being the Bagshot Formation in the London Basin, and the Poole and Wittering formations in the Hampshire basin and English Channel. Beneath the London Clay is the Harwich Formation which itself overlies Lambeth Group strata, these being rocks of the Thanet Formation in the London Basin.
