= Lambeth Group =

Group of rock strata in England

- Stratigraphic range: Thanetian-Ypresian
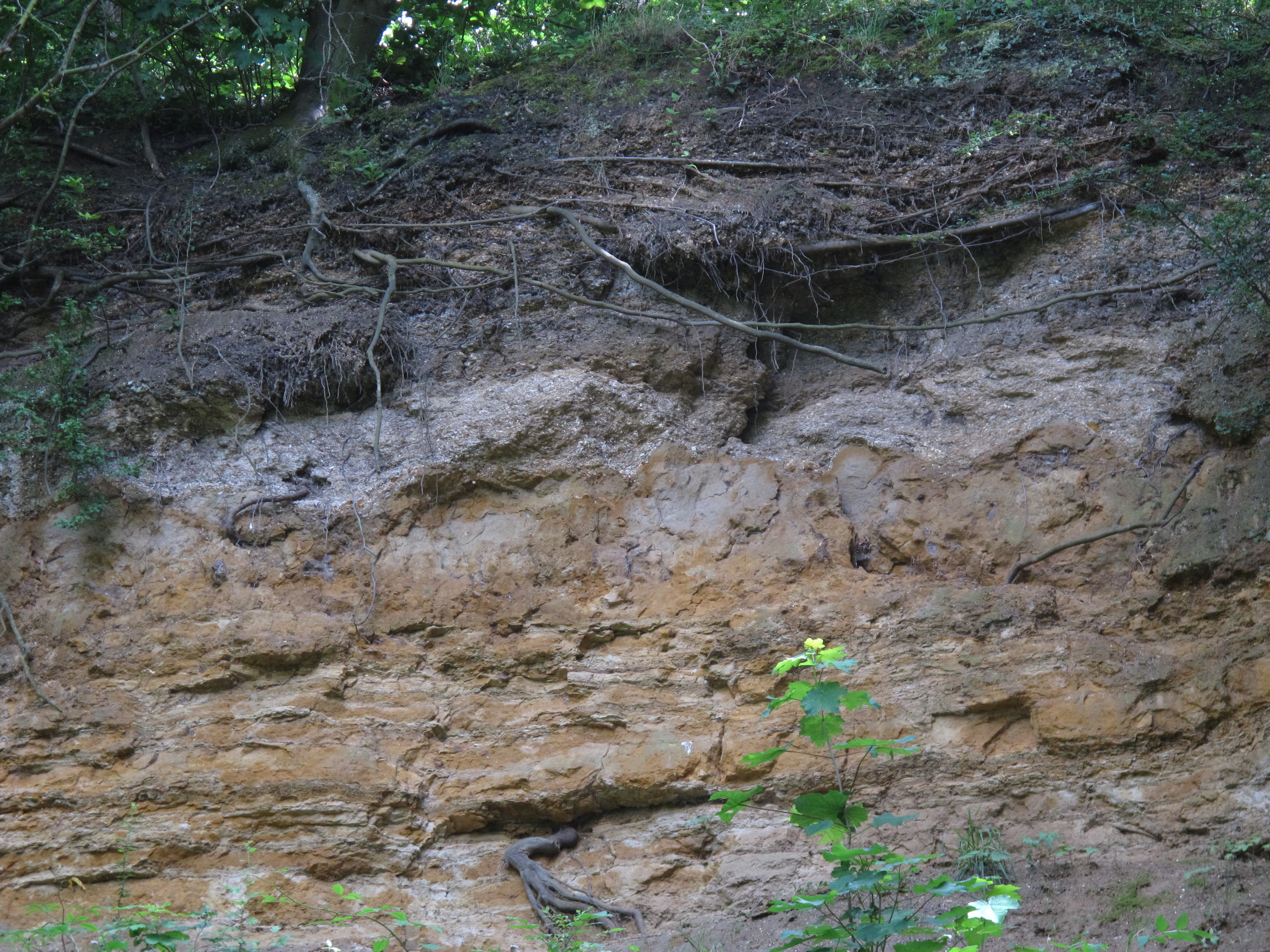
- Exposure in Gilbert's Pit. Dark grey clays, and light grey shelly clays of the Woolwich Formation overlying yellow-brown weathering sands of the Upnor Formation
- Type: Group
- Sub-units: Upnor Formation, Reading Formation, Woolwich Formation
- Underlies: Thames Group
- Overlies: Thanet Sand, Chalk Group
- Thickness: Up to 39 m

Lithology
- Primary: Clay
- Other: Sand, Gravel, Limestone, Lignite, Sandstone, Conglomerate

Location
- Region: southern England
- Country: United Kingdom
- Extent: London Basin and Hampshire Basin

The Lambeth Group is a stratigraphic group, a set of geological rock strata in the London and Hampshire basins of southern England. It comprises a complex of vertically and laterally varying gravels, sands, silts and clays deposited between 56-55 million years before present during the Ypresian age (lower Eocene). It is found throughout the London Basin with a thickness between 10m and 30m, and the Hampshire Basin with a thickness between 50m and less than 25m. Although this sequence only crops out in these basins, the fact that it underlies 25% of London at a depth of less than 30m means the formation is of engineering interest for tunnelling and foundations.

== History ==
The formation was first known as the Plastic Clay by Thomas Webster in 1816 after the Argile plastique of Georges Cuvier and Alexandre Brongniart. It was called the Mottled Clay by Joseph Prestwich in 1846, but in 1853 he proposed the name Woolwich-and-Reading Beds to emphasise the differing local aspects of the series. This name received widespread usage, but it was in turn deprecated in 1994 in favour of the Lambeth Group by the British Geological Survey, to conform with new standards and to allow scope for more detailed subdivisions.

== Subdivision ==
The Lambeth Group consists of three formations:

- The Reading Formation: a series of lenticular mottled clays and sands, here and there with pebbly beds and masses of fine sand converted into sandstone. These beds are generally unfossiliferous. They are found in the north of the London Basin, mid-west of the Thames Basin and in the Hampshire Basin.
- The Woolwich Formation: grey clays and pale sands, often estuarine shells comprise a great deal, in places including a well-marked oyster bed (strata). It overspills borders of west Kent, is found in edges of east Kent, in south Essex and at Newhaven, Sussex. At the base of the shell-rich clays in southeast London are pebble beds and lignitic layers.
- The Upnor Formation: light-coloured false-bedded sands with marine fossils occurs in east Kent. Where it rests on the Thanet beds it is an argillaceous greensand with rounded flint pebbles; where it rests on the chalk it is more clayey and the flints are less rounded and are green-coated.

In Dorset the Reading Formation appears on the coast at Studland Bay and at other points inland. The Hertfordshire puddingstone is a distinctive rock from near the base of the formation; a flint pebbly conglomerate in a siliceous matrix. The fossils, estuarine, freshwater and marine, include Corbicula cuneiformis, C. tellinella, Ostrea bellovacina, Viva parus lentus, Planorbis hemistoma, Melania (Melanatria) inquinata, Neritina globulus, and the remains of turtles, crocodiles, sharks, birds (Gastornis) and the mammal Coryphodon. Bricks, tiles and coarse pottery and occasionally firebricks have been made from the clay beds in this formation.

== Stratigraphic relationship ==
Except in the Hampshire Basin, the Lambeth Group usually rests on the Thanet Formation of the Montrose Group, but is found on the Chalk Group near Bromley, Charlton, Hungerford, Hertford and Reading. It is usually covered by the Harwich Formation, the oldest formation of the Thames Group.
