= Faroe-Shetland Basin =

Geological feature

The Faroe-Shetland Basin is a sedimentary basin formed by mainly Mesozoic rifting that lies between the Faroe Islands and the Shetland Islands. It has been the site of hydrocarbon exploration since the 1960s, with many significant oil and gas discoveries, including the Clair oilfield, which had an estimated 8 billion barrels of oil in place before production started, the Schiehallion oilfield and the Lancaster oilfield.

== Geometry ==
The Faroe-Shetland Basin is a SW-NE trending rift basin that is divided into several sub-basins with intervening ridges and highs. The geometry is less clear on the northwestern side of the basin due to the presence of thick Late Paleocene flood basalts. Even where the lavas are absent the development of large sill complexes makes seismic imaging at deeper levels difficult.

== Tectonic development ==
The first period of rifting identified in the area was during the Devonian as part of the development of the Orcadian Basin. Rocks of this age are known from parts of the Rona Ridge and the Corona Ridge. Rifting appears to have continued into the Carboniferous with rocks of this age also locally preserved above the Devonian. During the Permian to Triassic periods thick sequences of continental deposits were formed in a series of basins, such as the Papa Basin. The main period of rifting started during the Middle Jurassic, continuing into the Late Jurassic and possibly later. It was at this time that the Faroe-Shetland Basin took in its current shape. There was a further episode of rifting during the Late Cretaceous to Paleocene that locally modified the existing basins and formed new depocentres such as the Foinaven Sub-basin. At the end of the Paleocene, the area was affected by magmatism, part of the North Atlantic Igneous Province and a short-lived phase of uplift. The final phase of tectonics was localised inversion during the Eocene to Miocene that generated major anticlines.

== Hydrocarbon exploration ==
Hydrocarbons have been discovered in reservoirs of Archean, Devonian, Carboniferous, Triassic, Jurassic, Cretaceous, Paleocene and Eocene age in a mixture of structural and stratigraphic traps.
