= London Clay =

Low-permeable marine geological formation

London Clay Formation
- Stratigraphic range: Early Eocene, 54–50 Ma
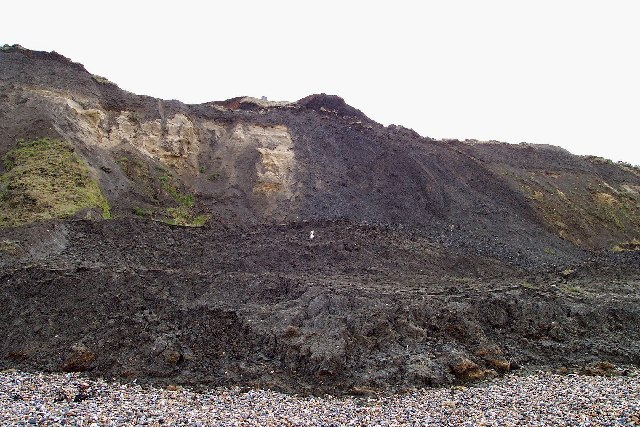
- London Clay at Reculver
- Type: Formation
- Unit of: Thames Group
- Underlies: Bagshot Formation (London Basin), Wittering Formation and Poole Formation (Hampshire Basin and English Channel)
- Overlies: Harwich Formation
- Thickness: up to 150 m

Location
- Region: southern England
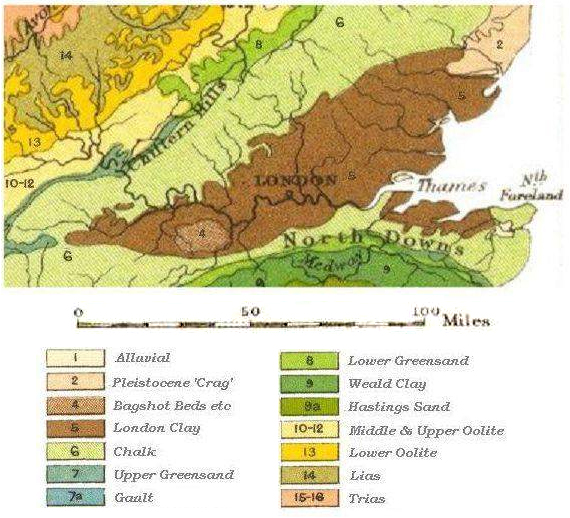
- Geological map of the London Basin; the London Clay is marked in dark brown.

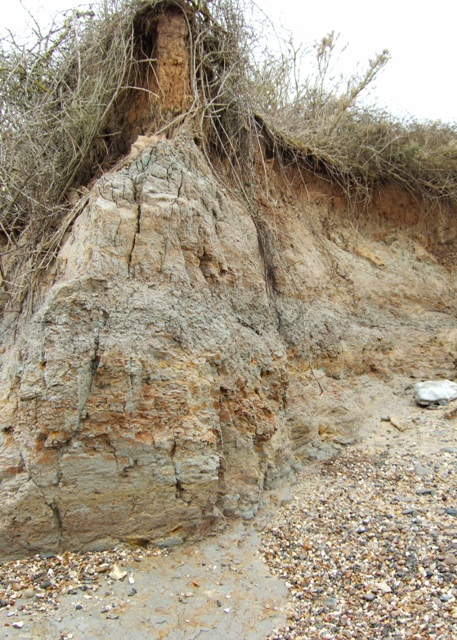
Eroding London Clay cliffs at The Naze in Essex

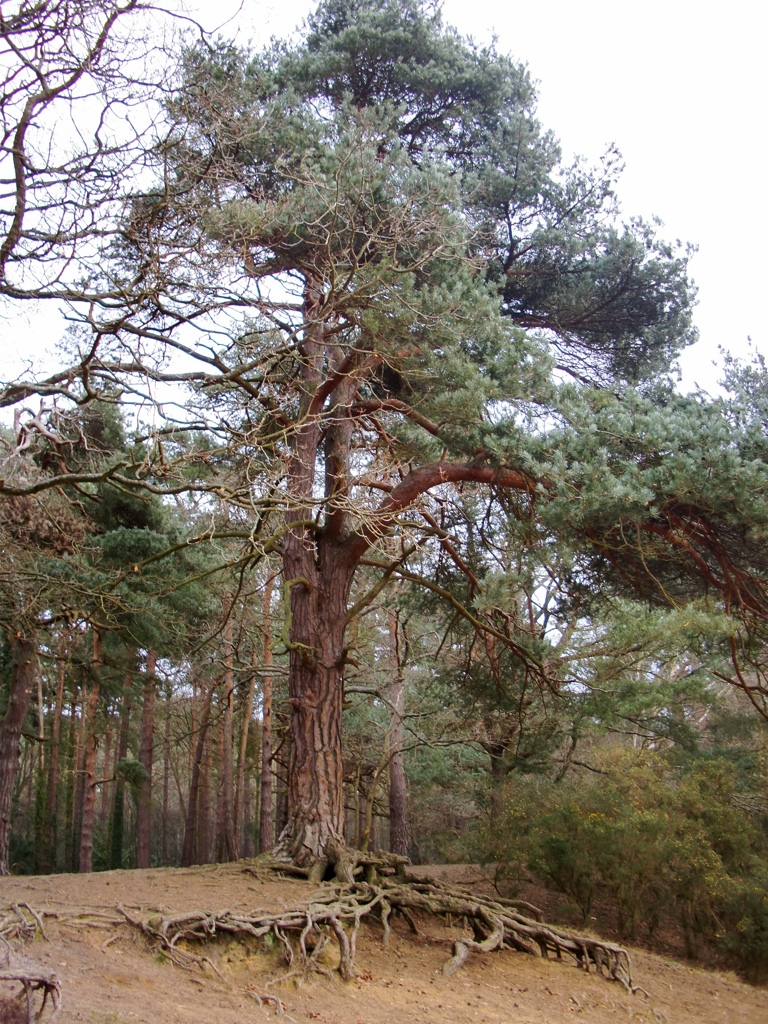
Oxshott Heath, where the overlying sand and the London Clay layers are exposed as a sand escarpment, rising approximately 25 metres (82 feet)

The London Clay Formation is a marine geological formation of Ypresian (early Eocene Epoch, c. 54-50 million years ago) age which crops out in the southeast of England. The London Clay is well known for its fossil content. The fossils from the lower Eocene rocks indicate a moderately warm climate, the tropical or subtropical flora. Though sea levels changed during the deposition of the clay, the habitat was generally a lush forest – perhaps like in Indonesia or East Africa today – bordering a warm, shallow ocean.

The London Clay is a stiff bluish clay which becomes brown when weathered and oxidized. Nodular lumps of pyrite are frequently found in the clay layers. Pyrite was produced by microbial activity (sulfate reducing bacteria) during clay sedimentation. Once clay is exposed to atmospheric oxygen, framboidal pyrite with a great specific surface is rapidly oxidized. Pyrite oxidation produces insoluble brown iron oxyhydroxide (FeOOH) and sulfuric acid leading to the formation of relatively soluble gypsum (CaSO_{4}·2H_{2}O, calcium sulfate dihydrate). This latter is more soluble and mobile than iron oxides and can further recrystallize to form larger crystals sometimes called selenite (coming from the moon, but not related to selenium, although the etymology is the same), or "waterstones".

Large septarian concretions, produced by microbial activity (oxidation of organic matter) in the ancient seafloor during clay early diagenesis, are also common. These have been used in the past for making cement. They were once dug for this purpose at Sheppey, near Sittingbourne, and at Harwich, and also dredged, off the Hampshire coast. The clay is still used commercially for making bricks, tiles, and coarse pottery in places such as Michelmersh in Hampshire.

== Distribution and geology ==
The London Clay is well developed in the London Basin, where it thins westwards from around 150 metres (492 feet) in Essex and north Kent to around 4.6 metres (15 feet) in Wiltshire. It is not frequently exposed as it is to a great extent covered by more recent Neogene sediments and Pleistocene gravel deposits. One location of particular interest is Oxshott Heath, where the overlying sand and the London Clay layers are exposed as a sand escarpment, rising approximately 25 metres (82 feet). This supported a thriving brick industry in the area until the 1960s. The London Clay is also well developed in the Hampshire Basin, where an exposure 91 metres (299 ft) thick occurs at Whitecliff Bay on the Isle of Wight and around 101 metres (331 ft) is spread along 6 kilometres (4 miles) of foreshore at Bognor Regis, West Sussex.

The clay was deposited in a sea up to 200 metres (660 ft) deep at the eastern end. Up to five cycles of deposition (representing transgression followed by shallowing of the sea) have been found, most markedly at the shallower, western end. Each cycle begins with coarser material (sometimes including rounded flint pebbles), followed by clay which becomes increasingly sandy. The final cycle ends with the Claygate Beds.

=== Claygate Beds ===
The youngest part of the London Clay, known as the Claygate Beds or Claygate Member forms a transition between the clay and the sandier Bagshot Beds above. This is shown separately on many geological maps, and often caps hills. It is up to 15 metres (49 ft) thick at Claygate, Surrey. It is now believed to be diachronous, with the formation at Claygate for example being the same age as the end of the fourth cycle of deposition further east.

== Engineering ==
The presence of a thick layer of London Clay underneath London itself, providing a soft yet stable environment for tunnelling, was instrumental in the early development of the London Underground, although this is also the reason why London had no true skyscraper buildings, at least to the same degree as many other cities throughout the world. Erecting tall buildings in London required very deep, large, and costly piled foundations. This has changed in recent decades due to the development of 'plunge piles'. London's skyscrapers float on rafts embedded in the clay.

London Clay is highly susceptible to volumetric changes depending upon its moisture content. During exceptionally dry periods or where the moisture is extracted by tree root activity, the clay can become desiccated and shrink in volume, and conversely swell again when the moisture content is restored. This can lead to many problems near the ground surface, including structural movement and fracturing of buildings, fractured sewers and service pipes/ducts and uneven and damaged road surfaces and pavings. Such damage is recognised to be covered by the interpretation of subsidence in buildings insurance policies, and the periods of dry weather in 1976/77 and 1988/92, in particular, led to a host of insurance claims. As a result, many insurance companies have now increased the cost of premiums for buildings located in the most susceptible areas where damage occurred, where the clay is close to the surface.

London Clay is also used to line exhausted quarries. This is because old quarry holes are generally refilled with waste material and by lining it with London Clay (which is virtually impermeable) it prevents waste and hazardous substances from entering the groundwater.

=== Tunnels in London Clay ===
London Clay is an ideal medium for boring tunnels, which is one reason why the London Underground railway network expanded very quickly north of the River Thames. However, south of the Thames, the stratum at tube level is composed of water-bearing sand and gravel (not good for tunnelling) with London Clay below, which partly explains why there are very few tube tunnels south of the Thames. London Clay has a stand-up time long enough to enable support to be installed without urgency. It is also almost waterproof, resulting in virtually no seepage of groundwater into the tunnel. It is over-consolidated, which means that it was once subject to an overburden pressure higher than it is subjected to today, and expands upon excavation, thus gradually loading the support, i.e. it is not necessary to stress the support against the ground.

== Uses ==
Due to its impermeability especially when exposed by ploughing, London Clay does not make good agricultural soil. In Middlesex, ploughing London Clay land so deep that it brings up clay has historically been called "ploughing up poison".

It was also disliked for building houses on, though inevitably most of Greater London is built on it. Jane Ellen Panton in her Suburban Residences and How To Circumvent Them (1896), remarks: "I do not believe clay is or even can be fit for anyone to reside upon ... though roses flourished magnificently children didn't, and coughs and colds [lasted through autumn and winter, this at Shortlands".

Many London buildings have ultimately been constructed with London Clay. When compressed and burnt, London Clay can be fashioned into brick known as London stock, identifiable by its yellowish brown hue.

== Fossil flora and fauna ==
Plant fossils, especially seeds and fruits, are found in abundance and have been collected from the London Clay for almost 300 years. Some 350 named species of plant have been found, making the London Clay flora one of the world's most diverse for fossil seeds and fruits. The flora includes plant types found today in tropical forests of Asia and demonstrates the much warmer climate of the Eocene epoch, with plants such as Nypa (Nipah palms) and other palms being frequently encountered.

Notable coastal exposures from which fossils can be collected are on the Isle of Sheppey in Kent and Walton-on-the-Naze, Essex, in the London Basin, and Bognor Regis in the Hampshire Basin.

=== Fruit and seed fossils from the Isle of Sheppey ===
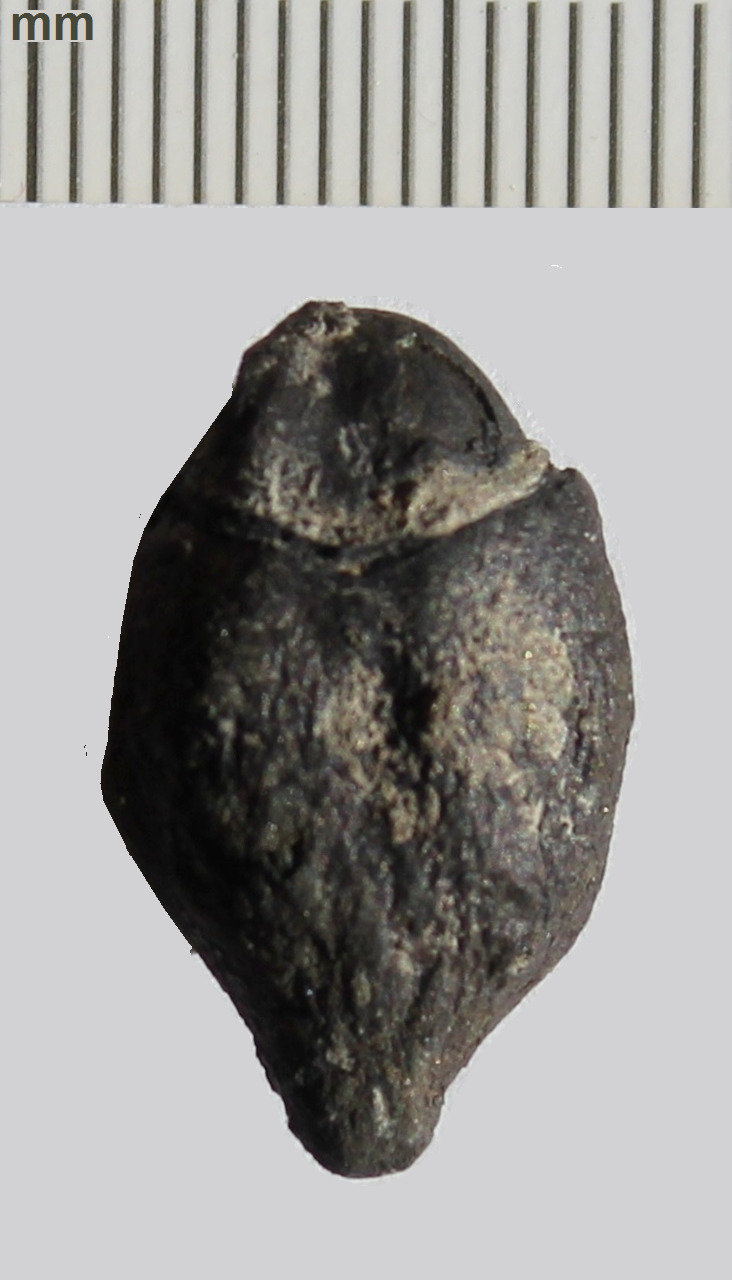
Ocotea sp. fruit, Lauraceae

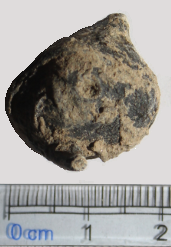
Avicennia sp. fruit, Acanthaceae

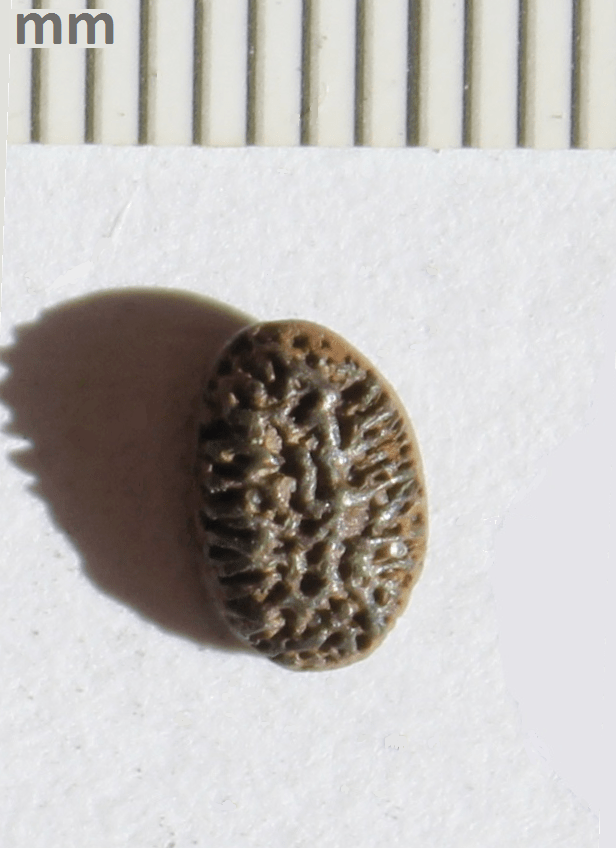
Iodes sp. seed, Icacinaceae

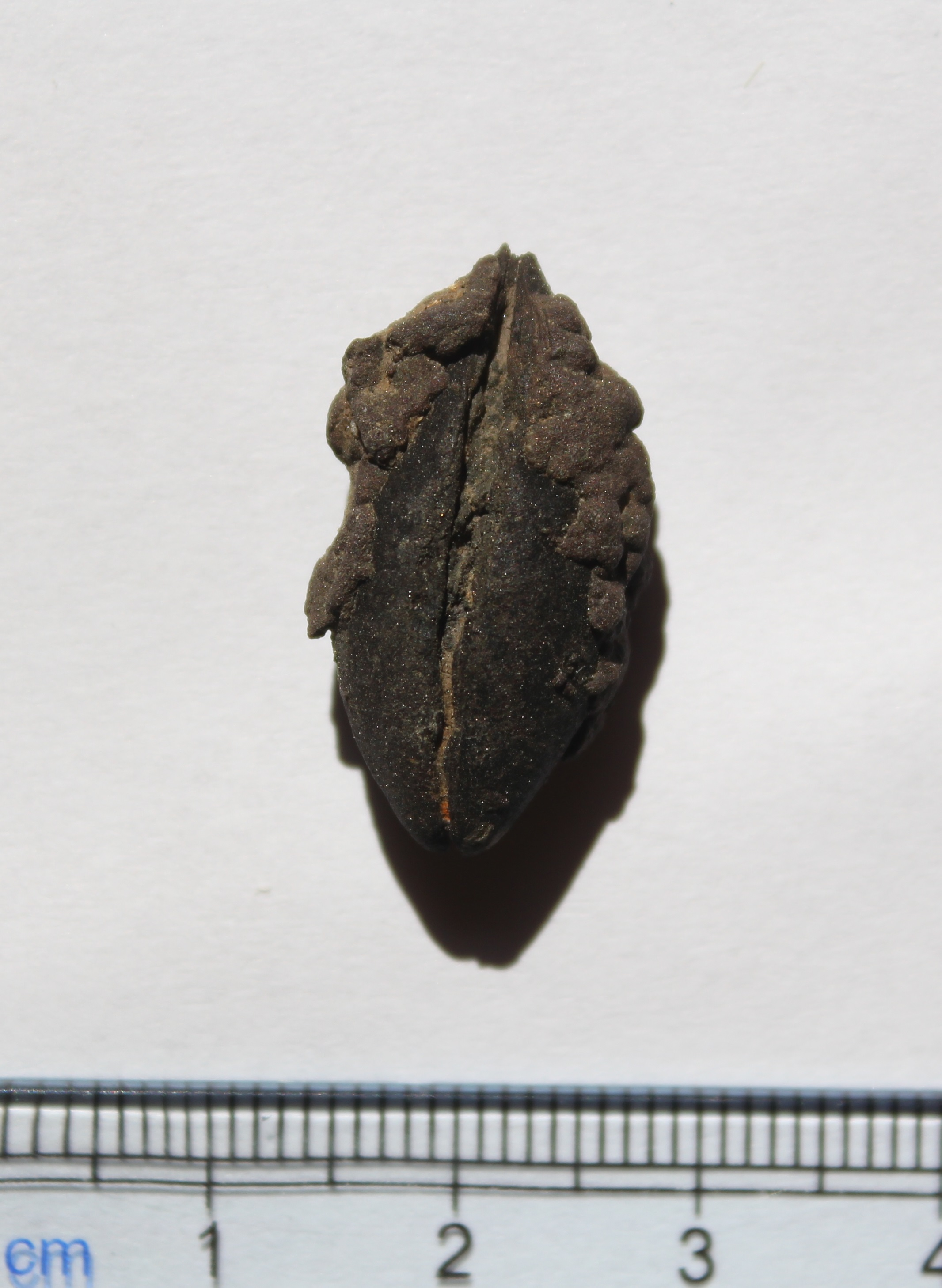
Mastixia sp. seed, Nyssaceae

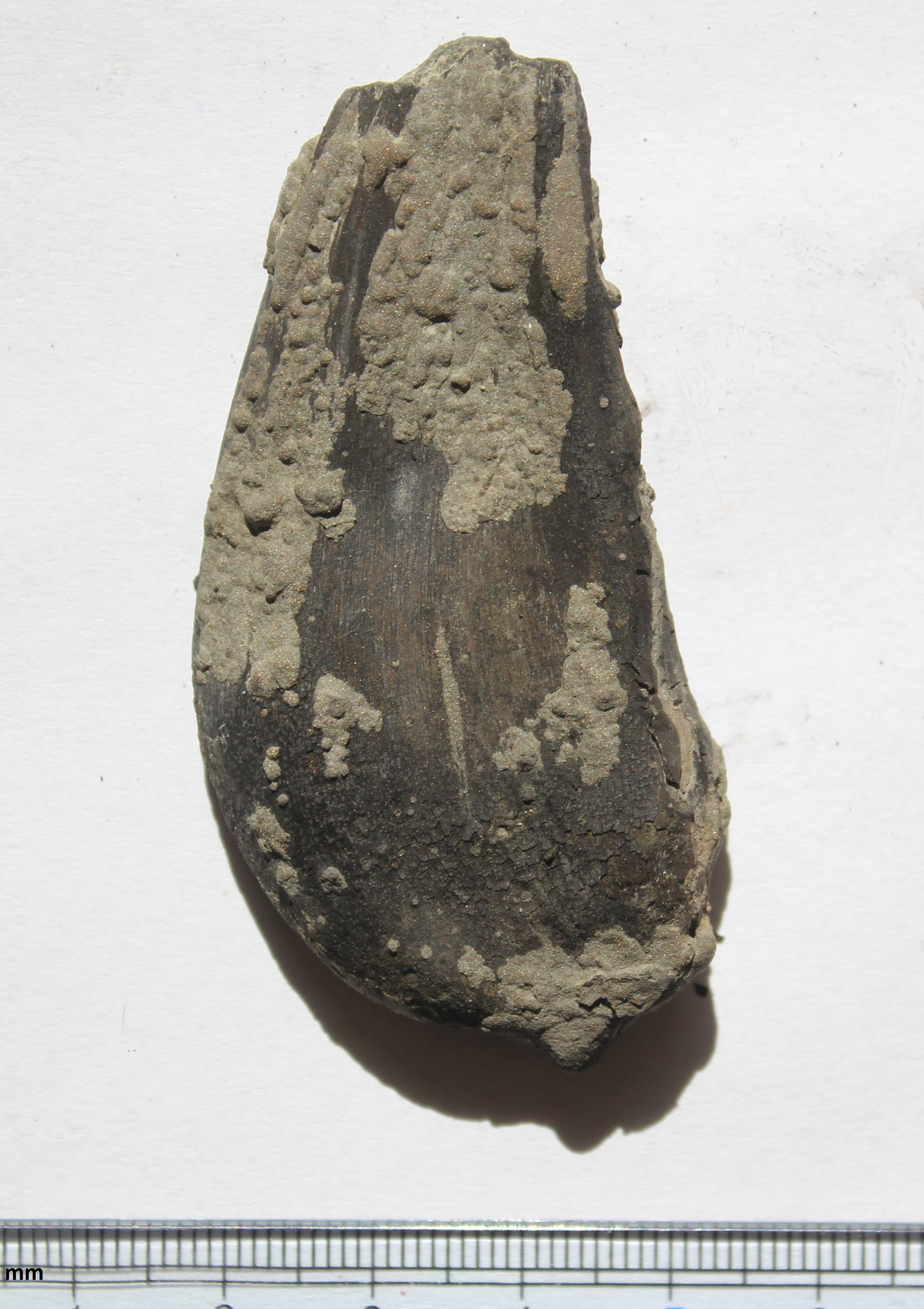
Nypa sp. fruit, Arecaceae

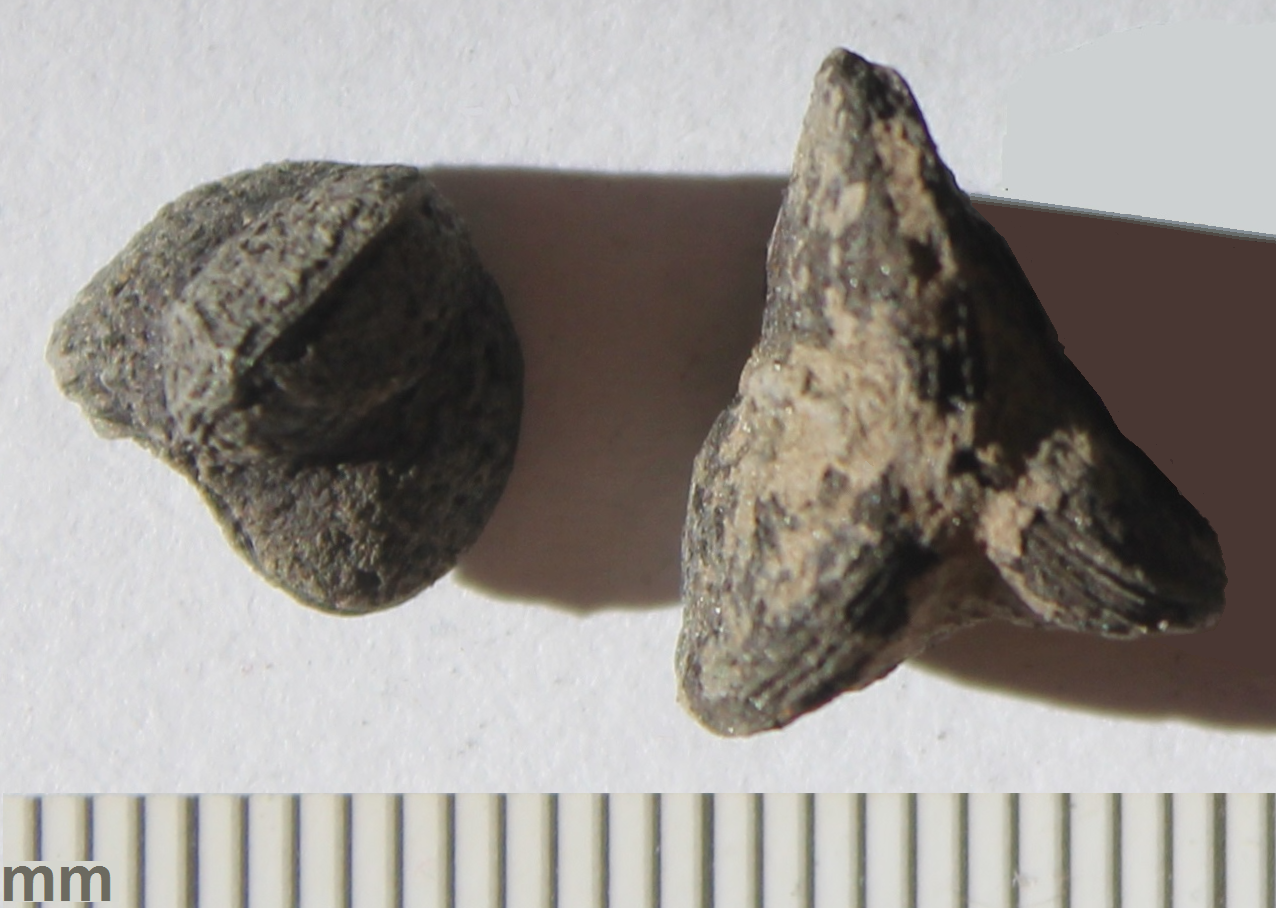
Seed capsules of the genus Euphorbia, Euphorbiaceae

== See also ==
- Geology of Hampshire
- Geology of Hertfordshire
- Geology of London
- Geology of Great Britain
- List of fossil sites
