= Harwich Formation =

- Stratigraphic range: Ypresian
- Type: Formation
- Unit of: Thames Group
- Sub-units: Swanscombe Member, Tilehurst Member, Harwich Member, Oldhaven Beds, Blackheath Member, Hales Clay
- Underlies: London Clay Formation
- Overlies: Lambeth Group
- Thickness: <2-24 m

Lithology
- Primary: sand, silt & clay
- Other: gravel

Location
- Region: southeastern England
- Country: United Kingdom
- Extent: London Basin

Type section
- Named for: Harwich

The Harwich Formation is a geological formation found in the London Basin of southeastern England. It is Ypresian (early Eocene) in age. It lies unconformably on the Lambeth Group over most of its extent, but may overlie either the Thanet Formation or the Chalk Group to the south. It is overlain by the London Clay Formation.

== Subdivision ==
The formation is subdivided into several members.

=== Swanscombe Member ===
The Swanscombe Member is the youngest member recognised within the Harwich Formation. It is a thin unit, generally less than 2 m thick, but shows a northward increase up to greater than 10 m locally. It is glauconitic, generally markedly so. Lithologically it consists of a mixture of sands, silts and clays, locally with shells and lignite. It typically has a gravelly base. It was deposited in a mid to inner shelf marine environment.

=== Tilehurst Member ===
The Tilehurst Member is regarded as a local variant of the Oldhaven Member by the BGS but as a separate unit by other workers. It is found to the west and northwest of London. It consists of glauconitic silt, sandy silt and sandy clayey silt, with sand layers in the form of thin laminae. The unit is typically about 2 m thick but reaches a maximum of 7 m. It was deposited in an inner shelf marine environment.

=== Harwich/Wrabness Member ===
The Harwich Member is regarded as obsolete by the BGS, being replaced by the Wrabness Member. The Wrabness Member is subdivided into a lower Unit A and an upper Unit B. Unit A consists of tuffaceous clayey silts and silty clays, with many layers of tephra. The upper boundary with Unit B is an apparent disconformity. Unit B consists of fine-grained sand with layers of clay, affected by bioturbation. The Wrabness Member reaches a maximum thickness of 24 m.

=== Oldhaven Member ===
The Oldhaven Member is dominantly a fine-grained glauconitic sand with cross-bedding, lamination and evidence of bioturbation.

=== Blackheath Member ===
The Blackheath Member is a distinctive unit that has been proposed to be raised to formation status.

=== Hales Clay/Orwell Member ===
The Hales Clay Member is regarded as obsolete by the BGS, being replaced with the Orwell Member. The Orwell Member is itself subdivided into three parts, known, from the base, as units A, B and C. Unit A consists of up to 1 m of fine-grained glauconitic sands with black gravel and some fossil fragments at the base. Unit B conformably overlies Unit A, consisting of up to 1.75 m of bioturbated silty sands and sandy clayey silts, locally with broken shells and dark clay laminae. Unit C, up to 2.5 m in thickness, consists of tuffaceous sandy silt with fine sand laminae.

== Use ==
Gravels and sands of the Blackheath member were at one time extensively quarried across Blackheath. Of the numerous quarries, only two remain relatively untouched, with the remainder being infilled either with rubble from bomb-damaged areas in the Second World War or from the laying of sewers across Blackheath. On the northeast side of the Heath, Vanbrugh Pits exposes the typical black flint pebbles in the sides and on the base of the old quarry. On the southwestern edge of the Heath, Eliot Pits were quarried down to the base of the Harwich Formation, the top of the underlying Lambeth Group.
