= London Basin =

Basin of river Thames in London

Coordinates: 51.8°N 0.4°E

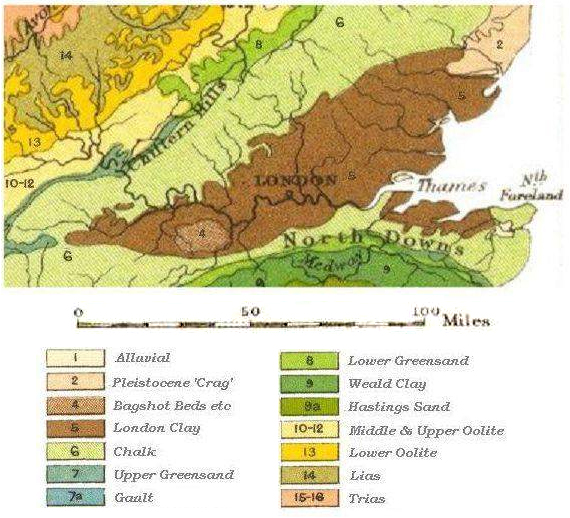
Geological map of the London Basin

The London Basin is an elongated, roughly triangular sedimentary basin approximately 250 kilometres (160 mi) long which underlies London and a large area of south east England, south eastern East Anglia and the adjacent North Sea. The basin formed as a result of compressional tectonics related to the Alpine orogeny during the Palaeogene period and was mainly active between 40 and 60 million years ago.

== Boundaries and shape ==
=== Spatial boundaries ===
The generally accepted boundaries are the Late Cretaceous Chalk Group's escarpments of the Chilterns and Marlborough Downs to the north and the North Downs and Berkshire Downs to the south. To the south lie the Weald and Salisbury Plain and to the north is the Vale of Aylesbury. The approximate western limit is in the Marlborough area of Wiltshire. The eastern end merges with the North Sea Basin, extending on land along the north Kent coast to Reculver and up the east coast of Essex and into Suffolk, where it is overlain by Pleistocene 'Crag' deposits which cover much of eastern Suffolk and Norfolk and are better considered as part of the North Sea Basin.

The axis of the basin runs west–east from Marlborough and Newbury (Berkshire) to Chertsey (Surrey) before swinging slightly north of east through Westminster, passing midway between Chelmsford and Southend-on-Sea (Essex) to the east coast between the estuaries of the Crouch and the Blackwater. Though north of the current mouth of the Thames, this line is well to the south of the centre-line of the basin which is asymmetric, its southern limb dipping more steeply than the northern.

Geological map of southeast England and the region around the English Channel, showing the London Basin in its regional context.

=== Geological boundaries ===
The Basin formed on top of the Late Cretaceous Chalk Group, which is exposed on the dip slopes of the Chilterns and North Downs. Within the centre of the basin the Chalk is mainly covered by Palaeocene, Eocene and younger rocks, though the chalk is also brought to the surface by localised folds and faults, for example at Windsor Castle, Lewisham and Purfleet. The Chalk forms an artesian basin, with fresh water springs emerging on the bed of the Thames. In the greater part of the basin the surface rock is Eocene London Clay, flanked at the margins by older deposits such as the Reading Beds. In large areas towards the western end the London Clay is overlain by rather younger deposits of the Bagshot Beds etc., forming sandy heaths.

== Tectonic history ==
=== London Platform ===
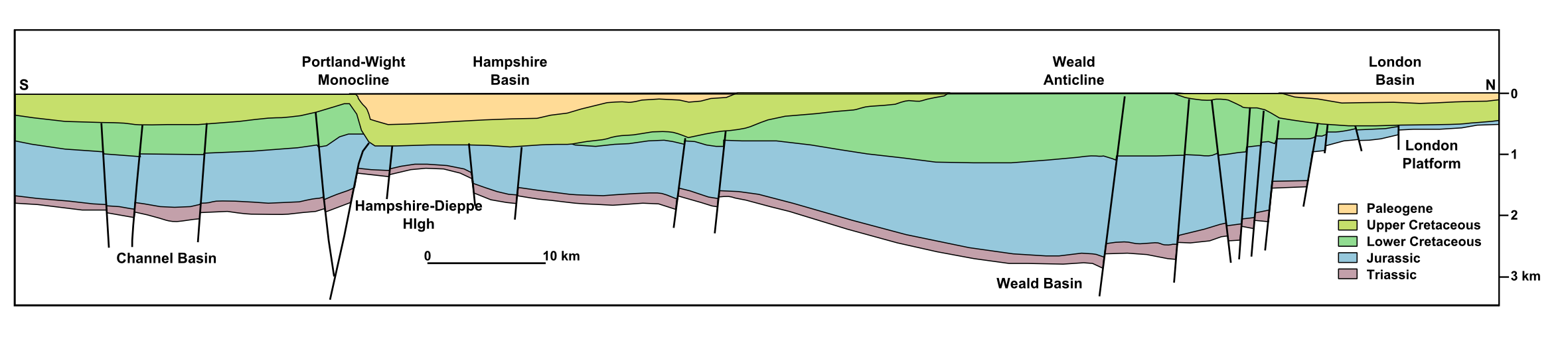
North-south cross-section of the upper crust of southern England, showing the Palaeogene London Basin to the north and Hampshire Basin to the south. Also visible is the inverted nature of the Weald, which was a basin during the Early Cretaceous and thus has a relatively thick Lower Cretaceous sequence. Vertical exaggeration 1:5.

Most of the basin is underlain at depth by a block of Palaeozoic rocks known as the London Platform. This is separated by faulting from the Early Cretaceous Wessex Basin (underlying the Weald and Hampshire Basin) to the south and the Worcester Basin to the west. Vertical movements of this block have affected both deposition and structure, with the result that many of the Mesozoic rocks underlying the neighbouring Weald are not present, or are very much thinner. Rocks of Triassic age are absent under London, occurring at depth only at the western edge of the basin. Jurassic rocks occur over a wider area to the west and south but are also absent under London itself. During Early Cretaceous times the platform was uplifted and eroded, with the erosional material deposited to the south as the Wealden Group. Sea level rose during deposition of the Lower Greensand Group, but only completely covered the platform during deposition of the Gault Formation. The whole area remained submerged during much of the Late Cretaceous, though the Chalk contains levels indicating periods of erosion.

During the Palaeogene the south-east of England was affected by movements related to the formation of the Alps (the Alpine Orogeny). One consequence of this was relative vertical movements, with the eastern part of the Wessex Basin being uplifted as the Weald-Artois Anticline and the London Platform subsiding to form the London Basin. Up to 320 metres (1,050 ft) of Palaeocene and Eocene sediments were deposited in the basin. The Pleistocene saw the sea retreat from the basin as global sea-level fell due to accumulation of ice sheets.

== Sedimentary infill and stratigraphy ==
The London Basin is mainly filled with Palaeogene sediments. The lowest (oldest) unit is the Thanet Formation (of Thanetian age, 56–58 million years old), which rests unconformably on top of the Chalk. It is composed dominantly of shallow marine sands. On top of the Thanet Formation lies the Lambeth Group, which was deposited in a coastal plain and/or adjacent shallow sea water during the late Thanetian and early Ypresian ages. The Lambeth Group consists of the Upnor Formation, the Woolwich Formation and the Reading Formation.

The Lambeth Group is overlain by the Thames Group, which consists of two formations. From old to young these are the Harwich Formation and the London Clay Formation (famous for its fossils). They were deposited in shallow marine, estuarine or coastal plain (paralic) environments and were deposited during the Ypresian age (55.8 – 48.6 million years ago).

On top of the Thames Group is the Bracklesham Group, which consists of the Bagshot Formation, the Windlesham Formation and the Camberley Sand Formation. The Bracklesham Group is also composed of shallow marine (near-shore) and coastal facies rocks. It can be up to 140 metres thick and is of late Ypresian to Lutetian age.

== Geography ==
=== Drainage ===
The basin is mainly drained by the River Thames, but does not coincide with the Thames drainage basin. The upper Thames cuts through the Chilterns via the Goring Gap, and consequently the Thames drains parts of the Cotswolds, Vale of White Horse and Vale of Aylesbury. The main headstream within the London Basin proper is the Kennet, which flows along the axis from the Marlborough area, joining the Thames at Reading.

To the south rivers such as the Mole and Medway, draining from the Weald, cut through the North Downs into the basin; these are presumed to date from before the erosion of the Weald dome.

During the Pleistocene ice age the lower Thames is believed to have been diverted well to the south of its earlier course closer to the main axis of the basin, probably by the Anglian Stage. The north eastern part of the basin is now drained to the North Sea by rivers including the Crouch, Blackwater, Stour and Orwell.

=== Settlements ===
Much of the basin is urbanised. Besides the whole Greater London Urban Area of over 9.8 million people, the basin contains most of the M4 Corridor including Newbury, Reading, Bracknell, Wokingham, Finchampstead, Maidenhead and Slough; the urbanised area to the south-west of London (Camberley, Farnborough, Aldershot and Guildford); north and south Thames-side (Thurrock, Tilbury, Basildon, Southend-on-Sea, Northfleet, Gravesend etc.); north Kent towns including Chatham, Rochester, Gillingham, Sittingbourne, Faversham, Whitstable, Herne Bay and Canterbury; Essex towns including Brentwood, Chelmsford, Braintree, Colchester, Clacton-on-Sea and Harwich; and towns to the north and northwest of London including Bishops Stortford, Harlow, Hertford, Stevenage, Harpenden, Hatfield, Welwyn Garden City, Potters Bar, St Albans, Luton and High Wycombe.
