= Thanet Formation =

Geological formation in London Basin, England

- Stratigraphic range: Thanetian
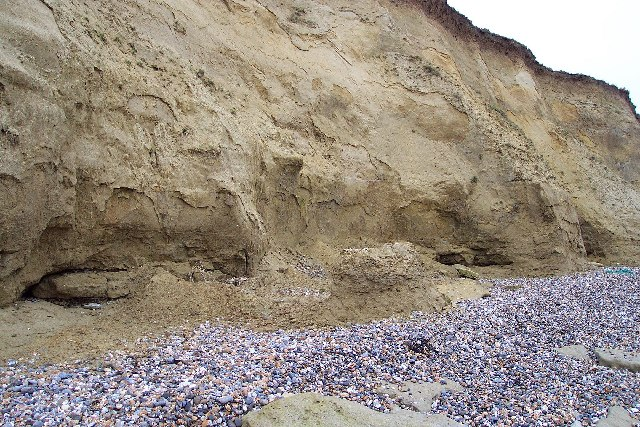
- Grey sands of the Thanet Formation in the cliffs just east of Herne Bay
- Type: Formation
- Unit of: Montrose Group
- Underlies: Lambeth Group
- Overlies: Chalk Group
- Thickness: 0–30 m (0–98 ft)

Lithology
- Primary: fine-grained sand
- Other: clay

Location
- Coordinates: 51.4°N 1.1°E
- Approximate paleocoordinates: 45.9°N 1.0°E
- Region: Southeastern England
- Country: United Kingdom
- Extent: London Basin

Type section
- Named for: Isle of Thanet
- Thanet Formation (England)

The Thanet Formation is a geological formation found in the London Basin of southeastern England. It is of early to mid-Thanetian (late Paleocene) age and gave its name to that stratigraphic interval. It was previously known as the Thanet Beds, the Thanet Sands and the Thanet Sand Formation. It was named after the Isle of Thanet. The type sections are Herne Bay in Kent for the upper part of the formation and Pegwell Bay for the lower part. It lies unconformably on the Late Cretaceous Chalk Group. It unconformably underlies the Lambeth Group, generally the Upnor Formation but in Essex it is the Reading Formation.

== Distribution ==
The Thanet Formation is known at outcrop and in the subsurface over central and eastern parts of the London Basin. To the west it is missing, with the Lambeth Group lying directly on the Chalk, and to the north it is replaced by the Ormesby Clay Member. It thins to the west and north of London. It reaches a maximum thickness of over 30 m in North Kent.

== Lithology ==
The predominant lithology is very pale grey or buff fine-grained glauconitic sand. Particularly towards the base of the formation, the sand is interbedded with silts and clays. At the base of the formation a bed of flint pebbles is often developed with clasts up to cobble size in a matrix of glauconitic clayey sand.

At Herne Bay the beds are divided as follows (top to bottom):

- A layer of concretionary blocks (‘doggers') of calcareous indurated sandstone of 0.3 metre thickness
- A pale grey sandstone with abundant shells 2.6 metre thickness
- A layer of calcareous sandstone doggers, 0.3 metre thickness
- A bedded, clayey buff sand with many shells, seen to 0.9 metre thickness

== Depositional environment ==
The Thanet Formation was deposited in open marine conditions. The water depth was relatively shallow, above normal wave-base, in an inner or outer shelf setting.

== Fossil content ==
The sequence is known for its rich fossil content, particularly molluscs and fish. The fauna give somewhat contradictory evidence of the climate, with molluscs of both cold and warm water type being found and tropical to sub-tropical fish recognised. Overall, a sub-tropical climate is indicated. The formation also has provided fossils of flora of Pinus macrocephalus, Pinus prestwichi, Palmae and Osmunda dowkeri.

== See also ==
- List of fossiliferous stratigraphic units in England
- Thanetian formations
  - Conglomérat de Cernay
  - Tuffeau de St Omer
  - Cerrejón Formation
  - Danata Formation
  - DeBeque Formation
  - Willwood Formation
