= Geology of the English counties =

List of Wikipedia articles on the geology of English counties

The following is a list of articles about the geology of English counties:

- Bedfordshire
- Berkshire
- Bristol
- Buckinghamshire
- Cambridgeshire
- Cheshire
- Cornwall
- Cumbria
- Derbyshire
- Devon
- Dorset
- Durham
- East Sussex
- Essex
- Gloucestershire
- Greater Manchester
- Hampshire
- Herefordshire
- Hertfordshire
- Isle of Wight
- Kent
- Lancashire
- Leicestershire
- Lincolnshire
- London
- Merseyside
- Norfolk
- Northamptonshire
- Northumberland
- Nottinghamshire
- Oxfordshire
- Rutland
- Shropshire
- Somerset
- Staffordshire
- Suffolk
- Surrey
- Tyne and Wear
- Warwickshire
- West Midlands
- West Sussex
- Wiltshire
- Worcestershire
- Yorkshire

== See also ==
- Geology of England
