= Geology of Staffordshire =

Geology of English county

This article describes the geology of the ceremonial county of Staffordshire, England which includes the modern administrative county together with the unitary district of Stoke-on-Trent but excludes those areas which were transferred to West Midlands in 1974.

The geology of Staffordshire in the West Midlands region of England is largely characterised by sedimentary bedrock of late Palaeozoic to early Mesozoic age overlain by a suite of superficial materials deposited during the Quaternary period. The extraction of coal, limestone and clay have been significant industries within the county.

== Cambro-Ordovician ==
The Merevale Shale in the extreme southeastern corner of the county is of Cambrian (Merioneth) to Ordovician (Tremadoc) age. It is predominantly a greyish mudstone but contains some dolomite. It was intruded during the Ashgill epoch of the Ordovician by sills of spessartite, lamprophyre and diorite. They form part of a grouping known as the Midlands Minor Intrusive Suite, other surface occurrences of which are at the Wrekin and near Nuneaton. A tiny outcrop of the underlying Monks Park Shale on the county boundary at Dost Hill is Staffordshire's oldest rock, dating back to the Merioneth (British regional) epoch between 499 and 485 million years ago.

No rocks known to be of Silurian or Devonian age are recorded at the surface in Staffordshire.

== Carboniferous ==
The Carboniferous period (359 - 299 million years ago) is represented by limestones, mudstones and sandstones in the northern third of Staffordshire with further outcrops along its margins elsewhere.

=== Carboniferous Limestone ===
The southwestern part of the White Peak lies within Staffordshire, its name owing to the presence of grey-white Carboniferous Limestone in the landscape. The limestones are assigned to the Peak Limestone Group:

- Ecton Limestone Formation / Hopedale Limestone Formation
- Milldale Limestone Formation (including a reef-knoll facies)

The mid to late Dinantian Ecton and Hopedale limestones are widespread in the triangle between Ecton, Tissington and Caldon. Outliers of the Ecton Limestone occur at Butterton and Mixon whilst outliers of the Hopedale Limestone occur in the Kniveden area. The Kevin Limestone is of similar age to the Hopedale Limestone and found in the Weaver Hills area.

=== Craven Group ===
Strata intermediate between the underlying limestone and the overlying gritstone are assigned to the Craven Group. Three formations are mapped in the area (uppermost/youngest first):

- Bowland Shale Formation (including Minn, Hurdlow and Kniveden sandstones)
- Widmerpool Formation (including Onecote Sandstone)
- Ecton Limestone Formation

=== Millstone Grit ===
The Millstone Grit Group outcrops across Staffordshire Moorlands district in the north of the county. Three formations are recognised in the area, within each of which are various named sandstones set amongst shale strata (uppermost/youngest first):

- Marsden Formation (including Rough Rock, Chatsworth Grit and Roaches Grit)
- Five Clouds and Sheen sandstones (not included within a named formation)
- Hebden Formation (including Longnor Sandstones)
- Morridge Formation (including Blackstone Edge and Lum Edge sandstones)

The Roaches Grit gives rise to The Roaches, Hen Cloud and Ramshaw Rocks together with outcrops at Flash and along Axe Edge, the southern end of which is just within the county. It forms prominent north to north-easterly dipping scarps at Back Forest and nearby Hangingstone and provides the bedrock in which the chasm of Lud's Church has opened up. It is also found in the vicinity of Rudyard. The overlying Chatsworth Grit gives rise to a number of gritstone edges in the Flash area.

=== Coal Measures ===
Within the North Staffordshire Coalfield, the Lower, Middle and Upper Pennine Coal Measures formations are mapped. The South Staffordshire Coalfield is now largely within the county of West Midlands and forms the basis of the Black Country. However Middle Coal Measures rocks do also extend north from it beneath Cannock forming the basis for that coalfield. A small area of Lower Coal Measures rocks extends beneath Goldsitch Moss in the northern angle of the county. It hosts a few coal seams and the Woodhead Hill Rock, a sandstone.

A small portion of the Warwickshire Coalfield extends across the county boundary under the eastern part of Tamworth.

=== Warwickshire Group ===
Warwickshire Group strata overlie the Coal Measures in the north and are found again (as the Salop Formation) around Loggerheads and Adbaston. The lowermost unit within the group is the Westphalian age Etruria Formation; it unconformably overlies the Coal Measures. This boundary was once thought to be a fault and references to the 'Symon Fault' are frequent. In the Enville and Baggeridge areas, the Etruria Formation is overlain by the Enville Member and the Clent Formation though the latter is of early Permian age.

East of the Coal Measures at Tamworth, the Etruria Formation is overlain by the sandstones and mudstones of the Asturian age Halesowen Formation.

== Permian ==
Permian strata is found on the western edge of the county and also in the southwest and southeast. The Salop and Hopwas Breccia formations which occur between Lichfield, Tamworth and Sutton Coldfield are of Permo-Triassic age. The Clent Formation (found in the Bobbington area but named from the Clent Hills which are beyond the county boundary) dates from the Cisuralian epoch and contains Precambrian and early Palaeozoic clasts.

== Trias ==
Most of the county is formed from Triassic age sandstones. There is a Triassic outlier at Leek. The Stafford Halite is known at subcrop as a member of the Sidmouth Mudstone Formation. A couple of outliers of the Blue Anchor Formation and overlying Westbury Formation occur south of Uttoxeter. Stratigraphically, these are assigned to the Mercia Mudstone and Penarth groups respectively.

== Structure ==
Much of the county rests on the Midlands Microcraton, an ancient crustal block beneath the English Midlands. Numerous faults cut the county, some of which help to define the late Palaeozoic depositional basins which include the Stafford Basin, the Needwood Basin to its east and the Bratch Graben. Beyond the Wem–Bridgemere–Red Rock Fault System, a small portion of the county extends into the Cheshire Basin to the northwest.

== Quaternary ==
A range of superficial deposits overlie the bedrock. The southeastern margin of the Devensian icesheet is drawn through the county with areas east of Cheadle and Cannock Chase unaffected by glacial ice during the last ice age. In the southwest, the ice did not advance beyond a line drawn south of Wolverhampton and Bridgnorth thus no Devensian till is known from the southernmost part of the county whereas it is plentiful elsewhere. During the Devensian, 'Irish Sea ice' moving across the Cheshire Plain reached to the western slopes of the Roaches, Hen Cloud and Morridge. Glacial drainage channels are noted along this ice margin to the east of Leek.

=== Caves ===
Caves are developed principally within the area of karst developed across the Carboniferous Limestone but are known from elsewhere. Thor's Cave is a well-known archaeological site and visitor attraction in the Manifold Valley. There are numerous other caves within this valley. Lud's Church within Back Forest is a chasm, developed within Millstone Grit, sometimes described as a cave. ‘Caves’ at Kinver Edge are not of natural origin but excavations into the Triassic sandstone some of which were once used as dwellings.

=== Mass movement ===
Landslides are recorded within the deeply incised Churnet valley where they affect Coal Measures rocks. They are also recorded from various strata within that part of the county which is within the Peak District National Park.

== Economic geology ==
The exploitation of Staffordshire's geology has been of significant economic interest over a long period. Most of the limestones within the northeast of the county have been quarried for building stone whilst some such as the Milldale, Ecton and Kevin limestones have been quarried for use as aggregate in the construction industry. The many sandstones within the Millstone Grit sequence have been used locally for the construction of buildings and dry stone walls. The Chatsworth Grit has also proved suitable for making millstones. Besides the widespread mining of coal, ironstone, clay and fire-clay have been extracted from the Coal Measures sequence. The overlying Warwickshire Group rocks have yielded not only building stone but also clays for brick-making and in the case of the Etruria Formation, for pottery.

Triassic sandstones have been quarried for building stone and for sand and gravel. Concealed halites within the Mercia Mudstone Group have permitted brine extraction. The Tertiary 'pocket deposits' were once worked for silica sand suitable for refractory brick-making. River terraces have been exploited for sand and gravel whilst peat was formerly extracted on a small scale at certain sites.

Mineralisation at Ecton resulted in economic deposits of copper and lead being worked.

== Geoconservation ==
A Geodiversity Action Plan for the county was published in 2004. It identified 66 RIGS ('regionally important geological sites') now referred to in England as LoGS ('local geodiversity sites') as well as listing the 13 Geological SSSIs which were in existence in the county at that time.

== See also ==
- Geology of Great Britain
- Geological structure of Great Britain
