= Geology of Rutland =

Geology of English county

The geology of Rutland in eastern England largely consists of sedimentary rocks of Jurassic age which dip gently eastwards.

== Jurassic ==
The oldest rocks that occur at the surface in the county of Rutland are the mudstones and limestones of the early Jurassic Lias Group. These are overlain to the east by a middle Jurassic sequence involving limestones, sandstones and mudstones of the Inferior Oolite Group and the succeeding Great Oolite Group with numerous outliers of the former occurring around Rutland Water and the country to its south. The lower part of the Great Oolite Group in the part of the Jurassic outcrop between Oxfordshire and Lincolnshire was once known as the 'Upper Estuarine Series' but is now formally referred to as the Rutland Formation. It comprises a series of seven or more depositional cycles resulting in a repeated suite of clays, limestones and clastics, some of which are marine in origin. A small outlier of the Oxford Clay Formation is found near Duddington, the main extent of this younger rock unit lying to the east of the county.

== Quaternary ==
Scattered deposits of glacial till occur across the county, a legacy of the Anglian glaciation. Alluvium deposited by the river floors the Welland valley.

== See also ==
- Geology of the United Kingdom
- Geology of England
