= Geology of Cambridgeshire =

Geology of English county

This article describes the geology of the ceremonial county of Cambridgeshire. It thus includes the present City of Peterborough and the historic county of Huntingdonshire which was brought into the county in 1974.

The geology of Cambridgeshire in eastern England largely consists of unconsolidated Quaternary sediments such as marine and estuarine alluvium and peat overlying deeply buried Jurassic and Cretaceous age sedimentary rocks.

== Jurassic ==
Limestones, mudstones and sandstones of the Inferior Oolite Group and Great Oolite Group dating from the early to mid Jurassic Period are present at depth beneath western Cambridgeshire. The later Kellaways and Oxford Clay formations and Ampthill Clay formations all assigned to the Ancholme Group of middle to late Jurassic times underlie much of central Cambridgeshire.

== Cretaceous ==
Cretaceous rocks come to the surface in the east of the county and beneath Cambridge itself including the lower and upper Greensand, the Gault Formation and lastly the Chalk Group, youngest element of the local bedrock.

== Quaternary ==
Extensive areas of older glacial till are mapped across parts of the southwest of the county, notably between Peterborough and Royston, south of Newmarket and in isolated patches around March and Ely.

== See also ==
- Geology of the United Kingdom
- Geology of England
