= Geology of Lincolnshire =

Geology of English county

This article describes the geology of the ceremonial county of Lincolnshire. Besides the modern administrative county, it includes the unitary authority areas of North Lincolnshire and North East Lincolnshire.

The geology of Lincolnshire in eastern England largely consists of an easterly dipping succession of Mesozoic age sedimentary rocks, obscured across large parts of the county by unconsolidated deposits dating from the last few hundred thousand years of the present Quaternary Period.

== Triassic ==
The oldest rocks exposed at or near the surface of Lincolnshire are the sandstones and mudstones of the early Triassic Sherwood Sandstone Group. Rocks from this and the overlying Mercia Mudstone and Penarth groups occur in the northwest of the county and along its western border but are generally concealed beneath a thick cover of recent deposits.

== Jurassic ==
A range of rocks from the Jurassic Period occur within a broadly north-south outcrop which tapers markedly northwards from the Fens to the banks of the Humber around Whitton and Winteringham. The lowermost and most westerly are the early Jurassic mudstones and limestones of the Lias Group, overlain in turn by the middle Jurassic Inferior Oolite and Great Oolite groups which comprise a mix of limestones, mudstones and sandstones and then the late Jurassic mudstones, limestones, sandstones and siltstones of the Corallian Group and succeeding West Walton Formation. Lincoln Edge is formed by the Oolite Group limestones.

== Cretaceous ==
The Cretaceous sequence begins with the Wealden Group limestones, mudstones, sandstones and siltstones which occur from Gibraltar Point in a band which narrows northwestwards to the Caistor area. To their east, and stratigraphically above them, are the sandstones of the Lower Greensand Group and beyond them the Chalk which gives rise to the Lincolnshire Wolds and extends to the North Sea coast but is obscured along the coastal margin.

== Quaternary ==
A wide range of superficial deposits have been laid down across the county in the last couple of million years. Lincolnshire was over-ridden by glacial ice on at least one occasion, that of the Anglian glaciation which left glacial till across much of the county. In the course of the more recent end-Devensian ice age, North Sea ice heading south penetrated inland as far as the eastern slopes of the Lincolnshire Wolds and into the embayment of The Wash. A further tongue of ice advanced southwards from the Vale of York into the northwestern corner of the county as far as the Isle of Axholme. Glacial sands and gravels occur in places along the eastern margin of the Wolds. There are extensive spreads of river, estuarine and coastal alluvium along the North Sea Coast and around the Wash as far inland as Crowland in the south and roughly along the line of the South Forty-Foot Drain. Alluvium also covers the flat floors of the Trent, Witham and Ancholme rivers whilst river terrace sands and gravels are widespread around Woodhall Spa, in the Trent valley and towards Lincoln, along the course of the River Slea and south of Sleaford through Bourne to Market Deeping. Areas of blown sand occur at Donna Nook and inland across an area centred upon Scunthorpe but extending southeast beyond Market Rasen and west to the Yorkshire border. Peat is common around the fenland margin from Walcot to the Cambridgeshire border near Crowland.

== See also ==
- Geology of the United Kingdom
- Geology of England
