= Geology of Tyne and Wear =

Geology of English county

This article describes the geology of the metropolitan county of Tyne and Wear in northeast England. It includes the cities of Newcastle upon Tyne and Sunderland and the modern metropolitan boroughs of Gateshead, North Tyneside and South Tyneside. Prior to 1974 that part of the county north of the River Tyne was a part of the historic county of Northumberland whilst that to the south was a part of County Durham

The geology of Tyne and Wear in northeast England largely consists of a suite of sedimentary rocks dating from the Carboniferous and Permian periods into which were intruded igneous dykes during the later Palaeogene Period.

== Carboniferous ==
Rocks of the Millstone Grit Group underlie the area.

=== Coal Measures ===
The Pennine Coal Measures Group comprises a Lower, a Middle and an Upper formation, each of which consists of mudstones, siltstones and sandstones and with, in the case of the two lower formations, numerous coal seams.

== Permian ==
Rocks of Permian age occur from South Shields southwards through Sunderland to the border with County Durham south of Hetton-le-Hole. The Magnesian Limestone forms a broken west-facing scarp raised above the Middle and Upper Coal Measures country to its west. In addition there are small outliers of Permian strata north of the River Tyne at Tynemouth, Cullercoats, Whitley Bay and Forest Hall.

=== Zechstein Group ===
The group comprises the following formations:

- Roker Formation
- Ford Formation
- Raisby Formation
- Yellow Sands Formation

== Palaeogene dykes ==
The 'Tynemouth Dyke' is a Palaeogene intrusion of tholeiitic dolerite which cuts the southern edge of Tynemouth Castle. The 'Walbottle Dyke' is microgabbro and forms part of a minor swarm of such dykes which are ultimately related to the Isle of Mull volcanic centre. The 'Hebburn Dyke' is another microgabbro which runs ESE from Newcastle-upon-Tyne through Hebburn to the coast at Whitburn.

== Quaternary ==
The larger part of Tyne and Wear is covered with a varying thickness of glacial till dating from the last ice age. Glacial sand and gravel is also widespread. Glacial lake deposits occur within the Team valley, a legacy of Glacial Lake Wear which resulted from the eastward flow of the region's rivers being blocked by North Sea ice at one time. The valleys of the Tyne and its tributaries the River Team and the River Derwent are floored by alluvium. Blown sand in the form of restricted areas of dunes is present on sections of the coast. The Pelaw or Upper Clay is widespread in the area and is interpreted as a flow till mixed with soliflucted material in places. It is generally between 1.5 and 3 m thick but reaches a depth of 4 m between South Shields and Washington.

== See also ==
- Geology of the United Kingdom
- Geology of England
