= Geology of Essex =

Geology of English county

This article describes the geology of the ceremonial county of Essex. It includes the boroughs of Southend-on-Sea and Thurrock.

The geology of Essex in southeast England largely consists of Cenozoic marine sediments from the Palaeogene and Neogene periods overlain by a suite of superficial deposits of Quaternary age.

== Cretaceous ==
The oldest rock in Essex is the White Chalk which occurs in the northwest of the county around Saffron Walden, as far east as Sudbury and south to Bishop's Stortford.

== Palaeogene ==
With the exception of a small inlier of Palaeocene sands at Witham, the lowest units of the Palaeogene sequence evident in Essex are the various Palaeocene/Eocene pebbly and shelly sand and clay formations of the Lambeth Group. Their outcrop reaches from Sudbury on the Norfolk border southwestwards to the Hertfordshire border at Bishop's Stortford. However the bedrock of the larger part of the county is formed by the silty clays and sandy clays of the succeeding Eocene age Harwich Formation which is ascribed to the Thames Group. Isolated patches of later Eocene sand, silt and clay occur in the area between Southend-on-Sea, Chelmsford and London.

== Neogene ==
A small outlier of Pliocene/Pleistocene 'crag' (a shelly sand) is recorded northwest of Braintree and a few isolated pockets are to be found between Harwich and Walton on the Naze.

== Structure ==
The concealed northeastern margin of the Midlands Microcraton is inferred to run NW-SE beneath Essex – just to the west of Basildon and Bishop's Stortford. Essex lies along the axis of the Wales-London-Brabant Massif (also known by other names including the 'Anglo-Brabant Massif' and 'St George's Land'), a zone which was emergent for much of the Carboniferous Period.

== Quaternary ==
Glacial till deriving from the Anglian glaciation occurs widely across the county northwards of a rough line from Brentwood through Chelmsford to Colchester. The area remained unglaciated during the more recent late-Devensian glaciation (the 'last ice age'). Sheets of glacial sand and gravel occur widely to the south of Colchester and to the east of Chelmsford and are also evident in the valleys of the Brain, Ter, Pant, Stour and Blackwater. Along the coast are extensive areas of marine and estuarine alluvium, most widespread around the Foulness Island and Canvey Island areas. River terrace deposits are significant around the Blackwater valley and in the Burnham on Crouch, Southend on Sea and Grays areas

== See also ==
- Geology of the United Kingdom
- Geology of England
