= Geology of Northumberland =

Overview of geology of English county

This article describes the geology of the historic county of Northumberland. It does not include that southeastern part of the historic county which has since 1974 formed a part of the metropolitan county of Tyne and Wear

The geology of Northumberland in northeast England includes a mix of sedimentary, intrusive and extrusive igneous rocks from the Palaeozoic and Cenozoic eras. Devonian age volcanic rocks and a granite pluton form the Cheviot massif. The geology of the rest of the county is characterised largely by a thick sequence of sedimentary rocks of Carboniferous age. These are intruded by both Permian and Palaeogene dykes and sills and the whole is overlain by unconsolidated sediments from the last ice age and the post-glacial period. The Whin Sill makes a significant impact on Northumberland's character and the former working of the Northumberland Coalfield significantly influenced the development of the county's economy. The county's geology contributes to a series of significant landscape features around which the Northumberland National Park was designated.

== Silurian ==
Rocks of the Gala Group outcrop near Berwick.

Greywackes originating during the Wenlock epoch of the Silurian Period are assigned to the Riccarton Group and occupy an area either side of the border to the north of Byrness.

== Devonian ==
=== Old Red Sandstone ===
The late Devonian Stratheden Group is characterised by sandstones with subordinate siltstones and mudstones. A small area of these rocks straddles the border to the southwest of The Cheviot.

=== Igneous rocks ===
Rocks assigned to the Cheviot Volcanic Formation, itself within the Reston Group, straddle the border with Scotland. This thick pile (over 1000m) of andesitic lavas was erupted during the early Devonian. The sequence includes rhyolites, agglomerates and tuff. The Cheviot Pluton is a mass of Devonian granite.

== Carboniferous ==
=== Inverclyde and Border groups ===
The Inverclyde Group extends west from Rothbury to the Scottish border near Byrness and north to Berwick-upon-Tweed. Rocks of the overlying Border Group extend in a broken and faulted belt south from Berwick towards Alnwick then southwest via Rothbury then onward to the county boundary west of Kielder Water. Within the Border Group, the Fell Sandstone Formation reaches up to 370m thickness and is locally prominent around Rothbury Forest where it also forms the Simonside Hills which reach a height of 440m at Tosson Hill.

=== Yoredale Group ===
The Yoredale Group comprises, in stratigraphic order i.e. lowermost/oldest first, the Tyne Limestone Formation, Alston Formation and Stainmore Formation. This succession is formed from mudstones, siltstones, sandstones and limestone. The Tyne Limestone forms a narrow and faulted belt of country south and southeast from Berwick-upon-Tweed to Alnwick. It also occupies a large area around Otterburn, Bellingham and Kielder Reservoir extending west to the Cumbrian border. The overlying Alston Formation extends south from the Scottish border along the coastal strip before turning inland through Alnwick towards Greenhead. It plays host to the intrusive Whin Sill. Besides a few inliers further north, the main outcrop of the Stainmore Formation stretches from the coast south of Craster towards Hexham and west along the valley of the South Tyne.

=== Coal Measures ===
The sandstones, siltstones, mudstones and coals of the Pennine Coal Measures Group overlie the Stainmore Formation and, from a line roughly between Amble and Derwent Reservoir via Morpeth, Ponteland and Stocksfield, extend eastwards to the coast with a gentle regional dip towards the North Sea basin. The upper Coal Measures are absent from Northumberland. Further small outliers of the lower Coal Measures extend westwards to the Cumbrian border southwest of Haltwhistle. The Northumberland Coalfield is contiguous with the Durham Coalfield to its south. the Tyne valley outliers gave rise to the very minor Stublick, Plenmeller and Midgeholme coalfields.

== Permian ==
The tholeiitic basalt of the Whin Sill was emplaced during early Permian times. As much as 215 cubic kilometres of quartz-dolerite may have been emplaced within lower Carboniferous bedrock in a sheet which extends to more than 4500 square kilometres of Northumberland and county Durham and which is typically 30m thick. A series of dyke sub-swarms is associated with the sill. Those within Northumberland are referred to as the Holy Island, High Green and St. Oswald's subswarms. The sill provides for characterful topography at Dunstanburgh, Bamburgh, Lindisfarne and neighbouring districts including the Farne Islands, offering several good sites for the construction of castles. Further south it provides the extended north-facing scarp on which the Roman emperor Hadrian had his eponymous wall built.

== Palaeogene ==
Numerous dykes of Palaeogene age cut the sedimentary rocks of the county. The most significant is the Acklington Dyke which running roughly east-southeastwards from the vicinity of the Scottish town of Hawick parallels the course of the Coquet, running just north of Rothbury and through the village of Acklington towards the coast. The dyke occasionally achieves a width of 30m. A Blyth subswarm and a Sunderland subswarm of broadly parallel dykes are recognised as likely emanating from the same source, the Mull igneous centre in the west of Scotland.

== Structure ==
Northumberland sits above the Iapetus Suture, the line along which the former Iapetus Ocean closed during the Palaeozoic, thereby causing the Caledonian Orogeny. During Carboniferous times, the Northumberland basin occupied the ground between the Cheviot block to the north and the Alston Block to the south.

== Quaternary ==
=== Glacial legacy ===
The larger part of the county is mantled by glacial till from the last i.e. Devensian glaciation. There are also a number of areas of glacio-fluvial sands and gravels representing glacially derived material re-worked by rivers. All of this material, till and glacio-fluvial deposits, is assigned to the Caledonia Glacigenic Group; within Northumberland, several different sub-groups are recognised according to the source of the material. North of the Cheviot massif, the till is assigned to the Borders Subgroup and to the south to the North Pennine Subgroup whilst that associated with the massif itself is classed as Cheviot Subgroup. Material originating from offshore (in terms of the present position of the coastline) is assigned to the North Sea Coast Subgroup, though the material along the coast from around Beadnell southwards is of mixed North Sea/Pennine provenance. The Pennine tills are generally dark grey reflecting the nature of the Carboniferous bedrock from which they largely originate.

=== Blown sand ===
Much of the coast is backed by areas of blown sand, notably at Ross Links south of Lindisfarne, Druridge Bay, at Lynemouth and to the north and south of Blyth.

=== Raised beach ===
Raised beach deposits are recorded at Spittal, Berwick-upon-Tweed, at Lindisfarne and around Budle Bay and elsewhere.

=== Peat ===
Large parts of Northumberland's uplands are blanketed by peat.

=== Alluvium ===
The floors of the main river valleys are formed by alluvium, sand, silts and gravel laid down by rivers and streams. River terraces are evident along the Tyne valley and three terraces are developed along that of the River Tweed. Terraces are also developed along the course of the Till, Aln, Coquet, Font, Wansbeck and Breamish.

== See also ==
- Geology of the United Kingdom
- Geology of England
