= Needwood Basin =

A feature of the geology of England, the Needwood Basin extends beneath the eastern part of the Midlands county of Staffordshire. It is a depositional basin which was initiated during the Permian period and continued to receive sediment during the Triassic period and perhaps thereafter. Part of a more extensive set of linked basins, it connects with the Stafford Basin to the west, the Knowle Basin to the south and the Hinckley Basin to the southeast. Up to 600m of Permo-Triassic strata are recorded from the basin which is partially defined by the Sandon Fault to the west and the Burton Fault to the east. It is flanked in part to the southwest by the Cannock Coalfield and to the southeast by the Warwickshire Coalfield.

The known Permo-Triassic stratigraphic sequence is thus (uppermost, youngest at top):

- Penarth Group
- Mercia Mudstone Group
- Sherwood Sandstone Group

== See also ==
- Geological structure of Great Britain
