= Stafford Basin =

A feature of the geology of England, the Stafford Basin extends beneath much of the Midlands county of Staffordshire. It is a depositional basin which was initiated during the Permian period and continued to receive sediment during the Triassic period and probably thereafter. Part of a more extensive set of linked basins, it connects with the Cheshire Basin to the northwest, the Worcester Basin via the Bratch Graben to the south and the Needwood Basin to the east. It is flanked in part to the west by the Coalbrookdale Coalfield and to the east by the South Staffordshire Coalfield. The sedimentary sequence, principally sandstones and mudstones, within the basin is continuous with that of the adjoining basins in the rift complex. Deposition of the Chester Formation (formerly Chester Pebble Beds) for example is ascribed to a river flowing north from the Worcester Basin through the Stafford Basin and on into the Cheshire and East Irish Sea basins during the early Triassic. In contrast the Bridgnorth Sandstone Formation of this area is of aeolian origin, the equivalent of the Collyhurst Sandstone of the Cheshire Basin.

The known Permo-Triassic stratigraphic sequence overlying Warwickshire Group strata is thus (uppermost, youngest at top):

- Mercia Mudstone Group
- Sherwood Sandstone Group
  - Helsby Sandstone Formation (=Bromsgrove Sandstone Formation) (Anisian, Triassic)
  - ---unconformity---
  - Wildmoor Sandstone Formation (Early Triassic Epoch)
  - Chester Formation (=Kidderminster Formation, Chester Pebble Beds) (Olenekian,Triassic)
  - ---unconformity---
  - Bridgnorth Sandstone Formation (Cisuralian Epoch, Permian)
  - ---unconformity---

== See also ==
- Geological structure of Great Britain
