= List of shear zones of Great Britain =

This is a list of the named shear zones affecting the rocks of Great Britain and the Isle of Man. See the main article on shear for a fuller treatment of shear in rocks.

== Key to tables ==
- Column 1 indicates the name of the shear zone. Note that different authors may use different names for the same shear zone or a section of it.
- Column 2 indicates the OS grid reference of the approximate midpoint of certain shear zones. Note that the mapped extent of a shear zone may not accurately reflect its actual extent.
- Column 3 indicates the country in which the shear zone occurs.
- Column 4 indicates the county in which the shear zone occurs. Some traverse two or more counties of course.
- Column 5 indicates on which sheet, if any, of the British Geological Survey's 1:50,000 / 1" scale geological map series of England and Wales (E&W) or of Scotland (Sc), the shear zone is shown and named (either on map/s or cross-section/s or both). A handful of BGS maps at other scales are listed too.
- Column 6 indicates a selection of publications in which references to the shear zone may be found. See references section for full details of publication.

== Tabulated list of shear zones ==
Sortable table of shear zones
Name of shear zone	OS grid ref	Country	County	BGS map sheet	Book references
Ben Blandy Shear Zone		Scotland			Trewin (ed) 2002
Berdale-Grocken Shear Zone		Scotland	Shetland	Sc 129	
Berw Shear Zone		Wales		UK (south):625K	Brenchley & Rawson 2006
Canisp Shear Belt		Scotland			BGS:BRG2
Canisp Shear Zone		Scotland	Sutherland	Assynt (Special 50K) Sc 101E, Sc 107W	Trewin (ed) 2002, G & K 2011
Central Anglesey Shear Zone		Wales		UK (south) :625K	
Central Huntly Shear Zone		Scotland		Sc 86W	
Eilrig Shear Zone		Scotland			Trewin (ed) 2002
Ericht - Laidon Shear Zones		Scotland			Trewin (ed) 2002
Etive-Laggan Shear Zones		Scotland			Trewin (ed) 2002
Gairloch Shear Zone		Scotland			Trewin (ed) 2002
Grampian Shear Zone		Scotland		Sc 84E	Trewin (ed) 2002
Huntly Shear Zone		Scotland			Trewin (ed) 2002
Keith Shear Zone		Scotland		Sc 85E, Sc86W	Trewin (ed) 2002
Kilchiaran Shear Zone		Scotland		Sc 27	
Lag ny Keeilley Shear Zone		Isle of Man			BGS:BRG7
Langavat Shear Zone		Scotland			Trewin (ed) 2002
Laxford Shear Zone		Scotland			Trewin (ed) 2002, G & K 2011
Lleyn - Menai Straits Shear Zone		Wales		UK (south) :625K	
Llyn Shear Zone		Wales	Gwynedd	E&W 133; 134	Brenchley & Rawson 2006
Moniavie Shear Zone		Scotland		Sc 9W, Sc 9E	Trewin (ed) 2002
Ness Shear Zone		Scotland			Trewin (ed) 2002
Portsoy Shear Zone		Scotland		Sc 85E, Sc 85W	Trewin (ed) 2002
Slieve Glah Shear Zone					Trewin (ed) 2002
South Harris Shear Zone		Scotland			Trewin (ed) 2002
Stoer Shear Zone		Scotland	Sutherland	Assynt (Special 50K), Sc 107W	G & K 2011
Uyea Shear Zone		Scotland	Shetland	Sc 129	BGS:BRG1
Virdibreck Shear Zone		Scotland	Shetland	Sc 129	
Wester Keolka Shear Zone		Scotland	Shetland	Sc 129	BGS:BRG1

== See also ==
- List of geological faults of Scotland
- List of geological faults of Wales
- List of geological folds in Great Britain
- Geological structure of Great Britain
