= Cyclic sediments =

Type of layers in sedimentary rocks

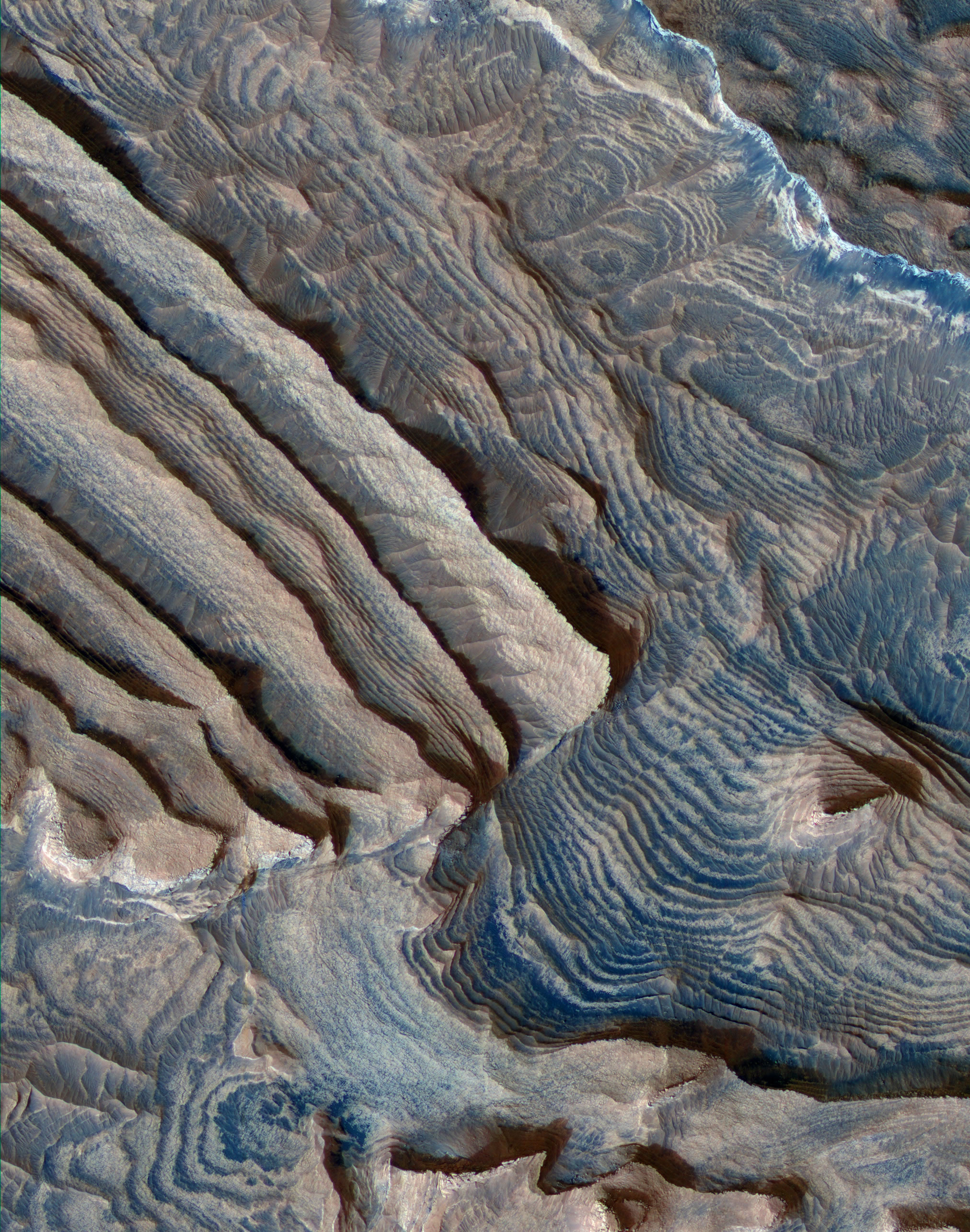
Rhythmic cycles of deposition in sedimentary rock in Becquerel Crater, captured by the High Resolution Imaging Science Experiment camera on the Mars Reconnaissance Orbiter

Cyclic sediments (also called rhythmic sediments) are sequences of sedimentary rocks that are characterised by repetitive patterns of different rock types (strata) or facies within the sequence. Processes that generate sedimentary cyclicity can be either autocyclic or allocyclic, and can result in piles of sedimentary cycles hundreds or even thousands of metres thick. The study of sequence stratigraphy was developed from controversies over the causes of cyclic sedimentation.

== Processes leading to cyclic sedimentation ==
Cyclic sedimentation occurs when the depositional environments change repeatedly. Changes in the environment of deposition influence the type and amount of sediments that are deposited, producing different sedimentary rock types. At least one rock type, which is regarded as the starting point, must be repeated.

Based on the processes that generate the cyclic deposits, two types of sedimentary cyclic successions can be distinguished.

=== Allocycles ===
Allocycles are sedimentary cycles caused by processes outside of the depositional system and that involve forced oscillations of the sedimentary system; in this case the cyclic succession registers some features of the forcing process (Sea level fluctuations, climate oscillations or tectonic activity). Allocyclic successions can extend over great distances and are not limited to a single depositional basin.

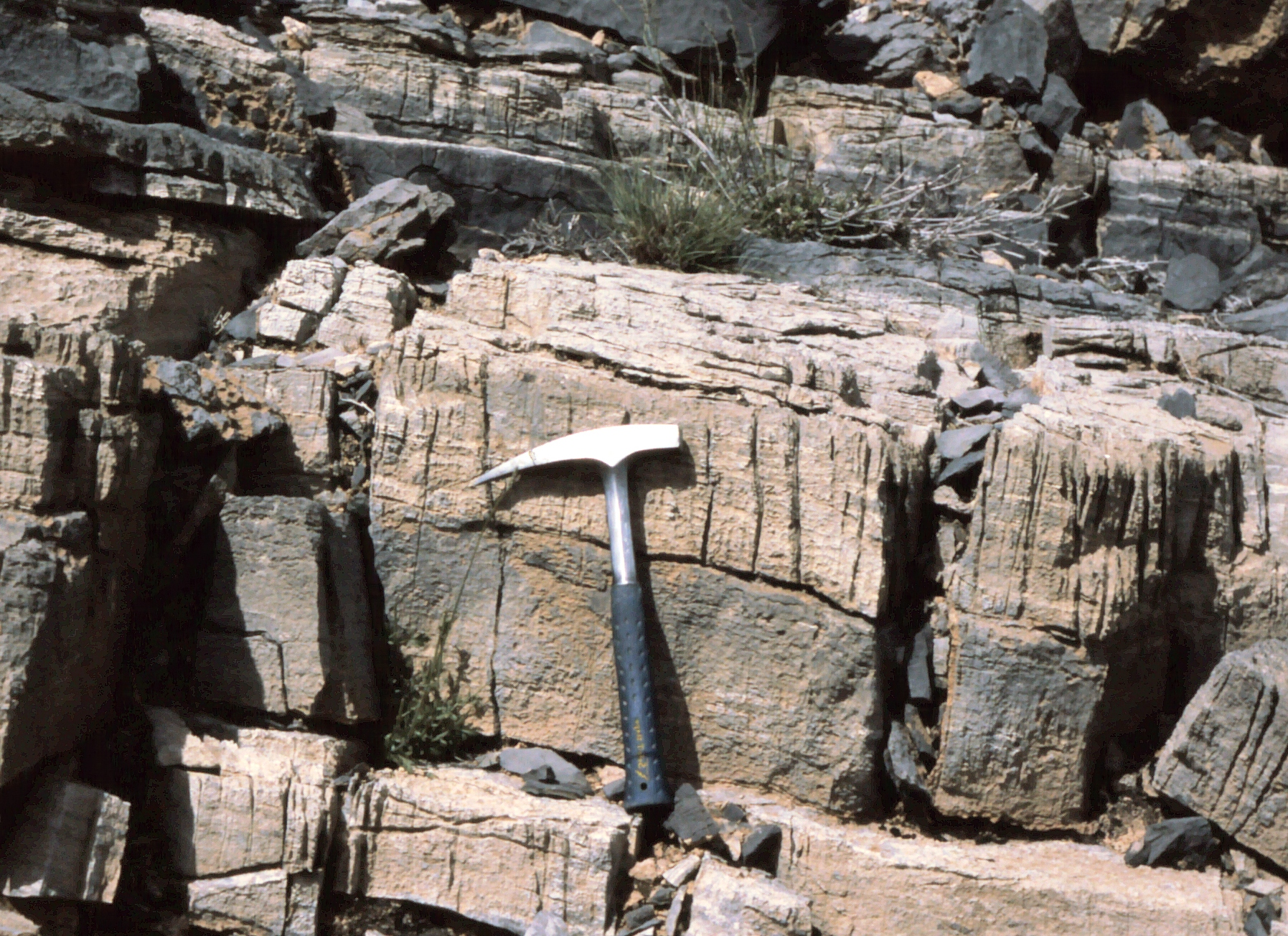
"Shallowing upward" cycles in the lagoonal Liassic platform of the Musandam Peninsula(Oman). Possible allocyclic origin.

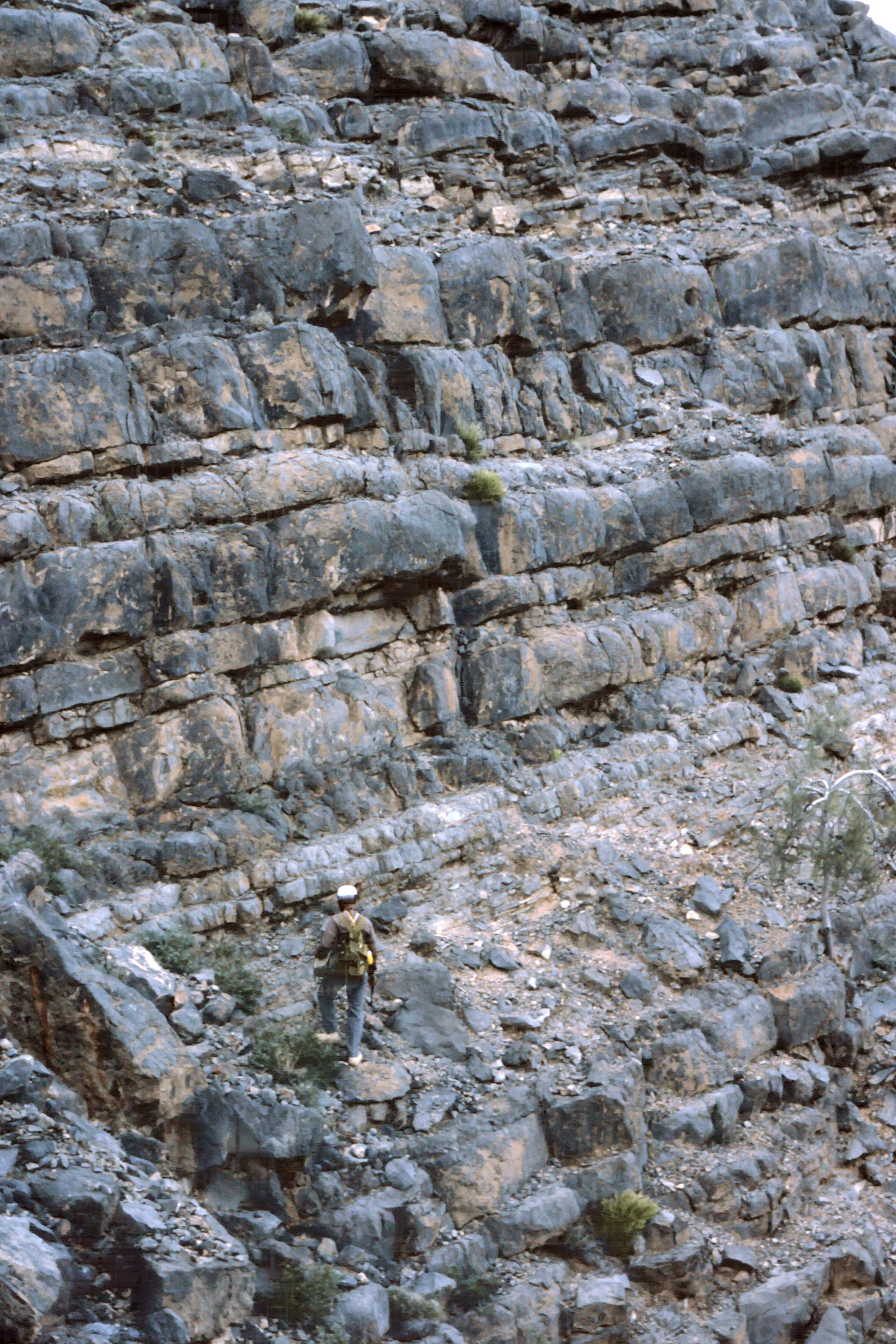
Possible allocyclic metric cycles, arranged in decametric sequences, limited by yellow algal, dolomitized levels, below depositional hiatus.

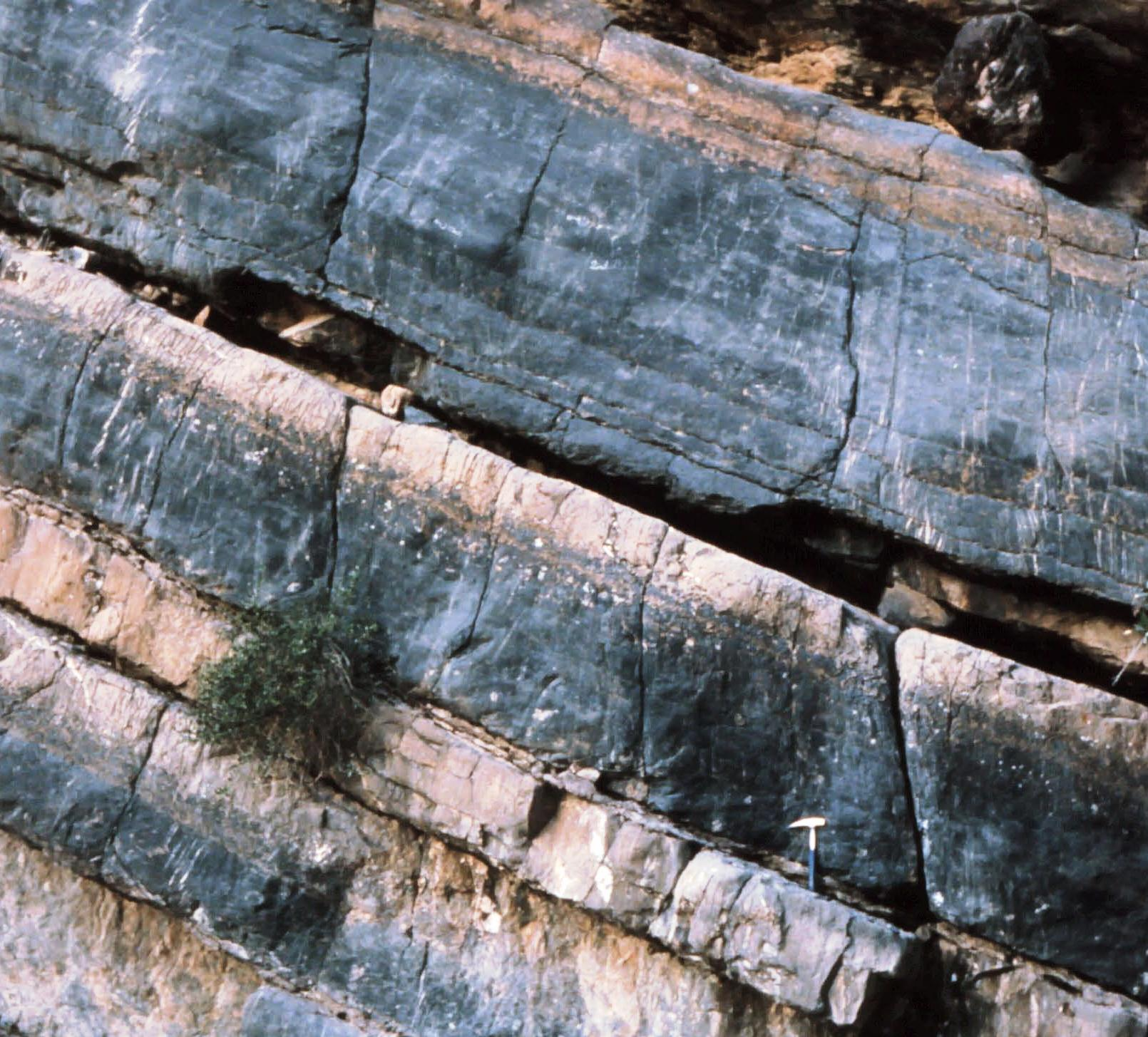
"Shallowing upward" cycles in the Middle Jurassic (Saghtan form.) of the jbel Laghdar Range (Oman).

Changes in sea level can create cyclic successions of limestones, shales, coals and seat earths. For these cycles to have been formed, the environment at the site of deposition must have been changing radically from marine to deltaic, then lagoonal and then continental. One cause of sea level change is the expansion or shrinking of continental glaciers caused by climate change. Tectonic movements can affect the environment of deposition as well, by changing the local relative sea level. Metric sedimentary cycles could be related to an astronomical (Milankovitch) influence on 20.000 to 400000 years time scales (see Cyclostratigraphy). But these beds are of no use in correlation and should not be taken as a "high resolution" tool for stratigraphy without a severe biostratigraphic control.

Seasonal changes in weather can create cyclic sediments in the form of alternating bands of clay and silt (also known as varves). For example, in a glacial region where sediments are deposited in a lake, coarse sediments that are trapped in ice are released when the ice melts in the summer. This creates paler, coarser silt bands in the lake deposits. In winter, melting is at a minimum, meaning that only fine material is supplied to the lake, causing thin clay layers. Varves form through an allocyclic process, but because the cycles are limited to the depositional basin, the lateral extent of the resultant strata are limited.

=== Autocycles ===
Autocycles are sedimentary cycles that are created by processes that only take place within the basin of deposition and that involve free oscillations of the sedimentary system; indeed, the resulting cyclic succession is only function of the geometrical and sedimentary parameters characteristic of the depositional system (e.g.: shelf dimension and shape, carbonate productivity, etc.). Autocycles show limited stratigraphic continuity.

An example of autocyclic sedimentation on a carbonate platform was provided by Septfontaine M. (1985): Depositional environments and associated foraminifera (lituolids) in the middle liasic carbonate platform of Morocco.- Rev. de Micropal., 28/4, 265-289. See also www.palgeo.ch/publications.

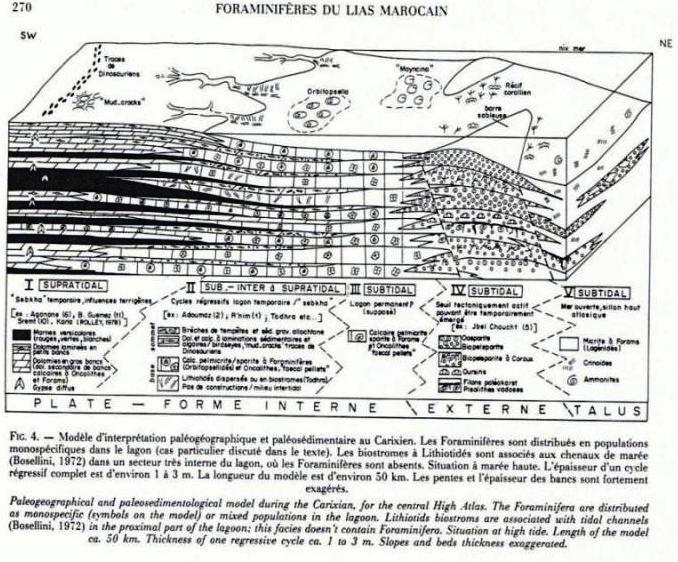
High Atlas middle liassic carbonate platform of Morocco and succession of regressive, autocyclic, "shallowing upward" metric sequences.

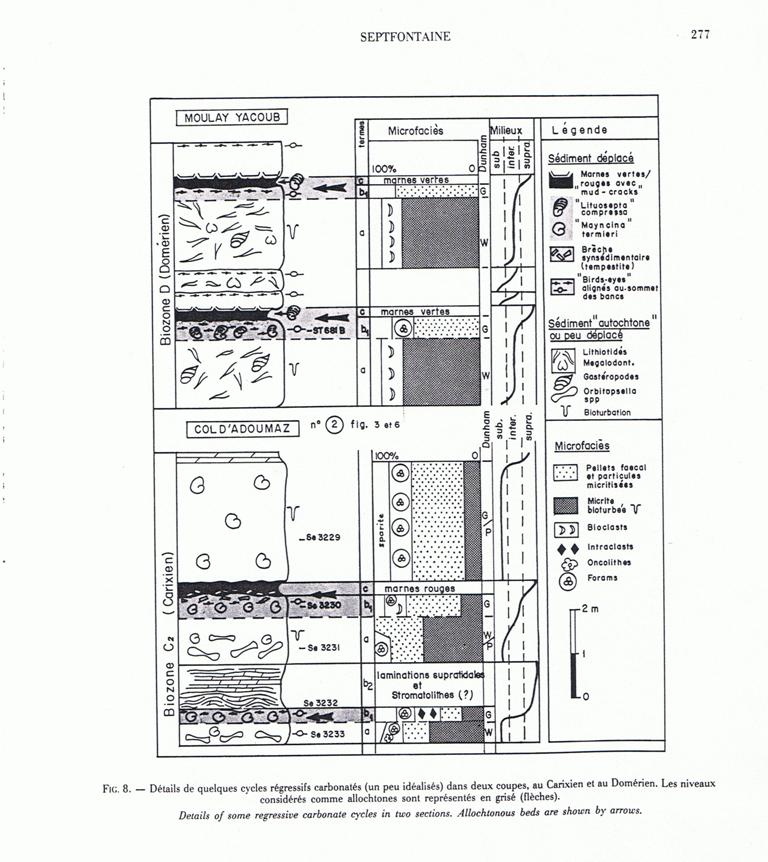
"shallowing upward" sequences from two sections distant of 230 km; note the hurricane (tempestites and tsunami ?)levels with abundant displaced foraminifera on supratidal flat. Middle Liassic, Morocco.

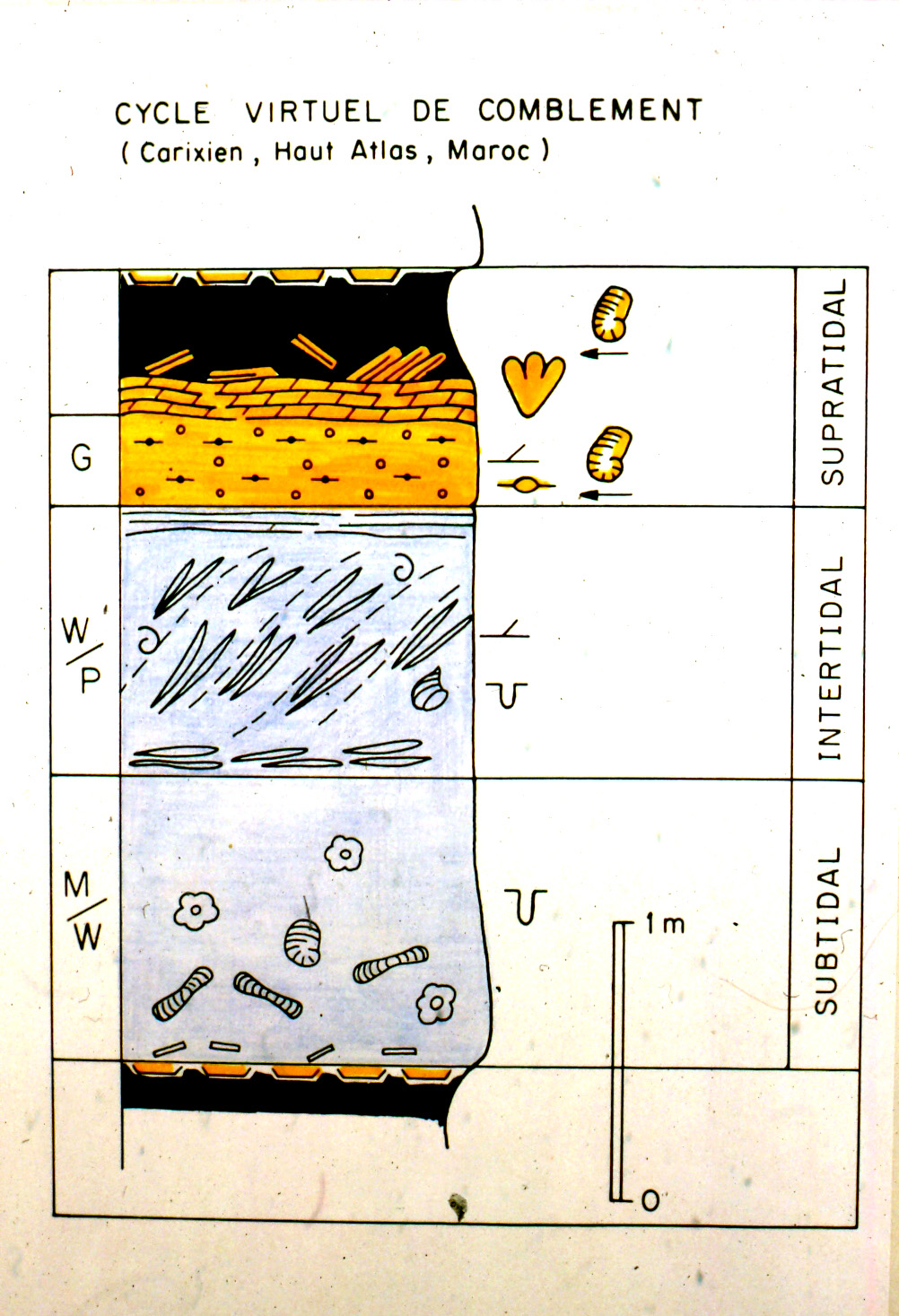
Model of a virtual "shallowing upward" metric sequence observed on carbonate platforms all along the south tethyan margin (about 10.000km) during the Liassic. (Micro)fossils are identical from the Maghreb till Oman and furtheron.

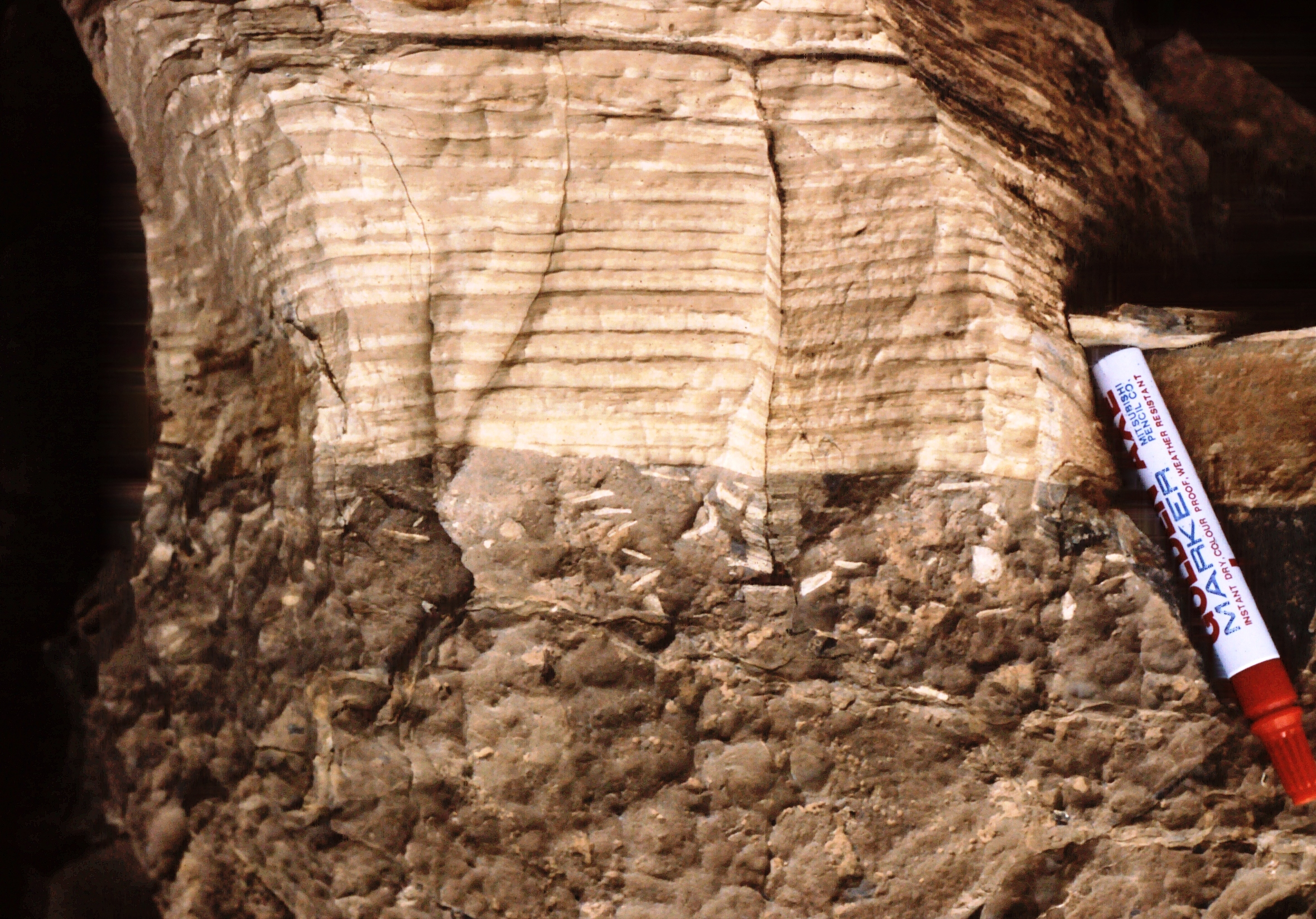
"Shallowing upward" metric first order cycle in the Middle Liassic platform of the High Atlas, Morocco. Algal dolomitized laminations on top.

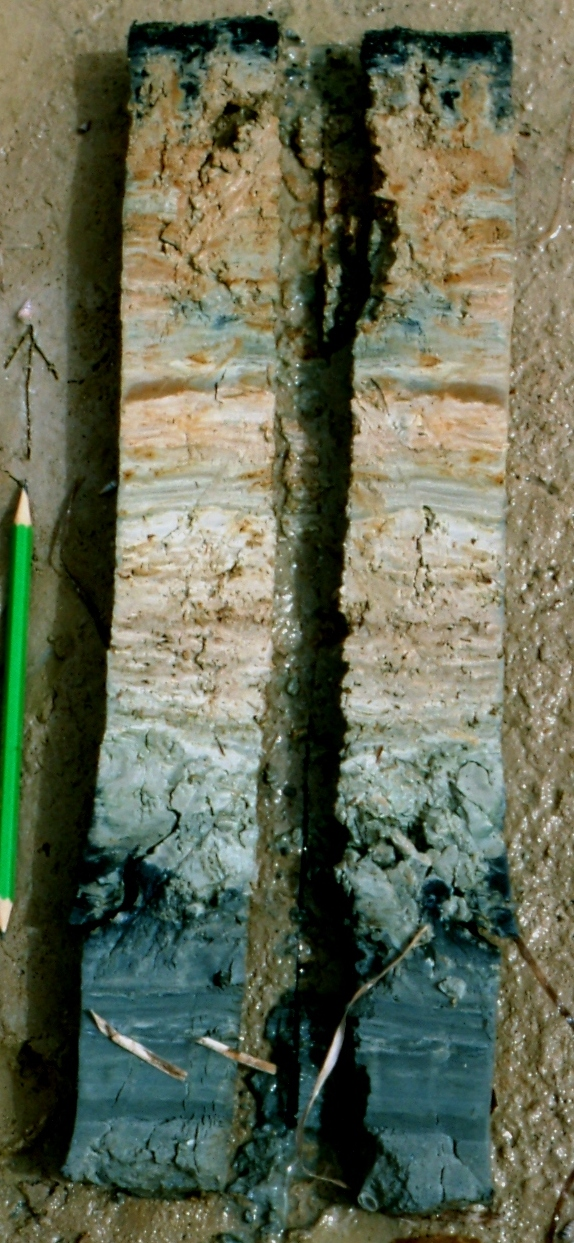
Recent equivalent of an emersive autocyclic cycle in a lagoonal to supratidal environment. Algal mats in yellow. Tunisia.

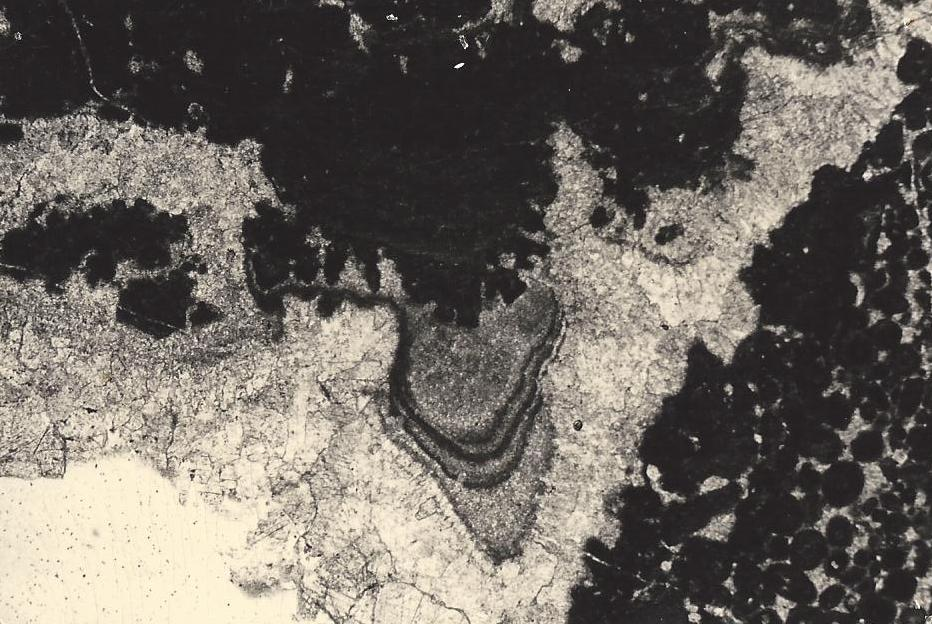
Stalactitic cement from a sample in the supratidal zone in vadose environment (air within the sediment), top of regressive cycle, middle Lias, High Atlas. Thin section, L = 0,5mm.

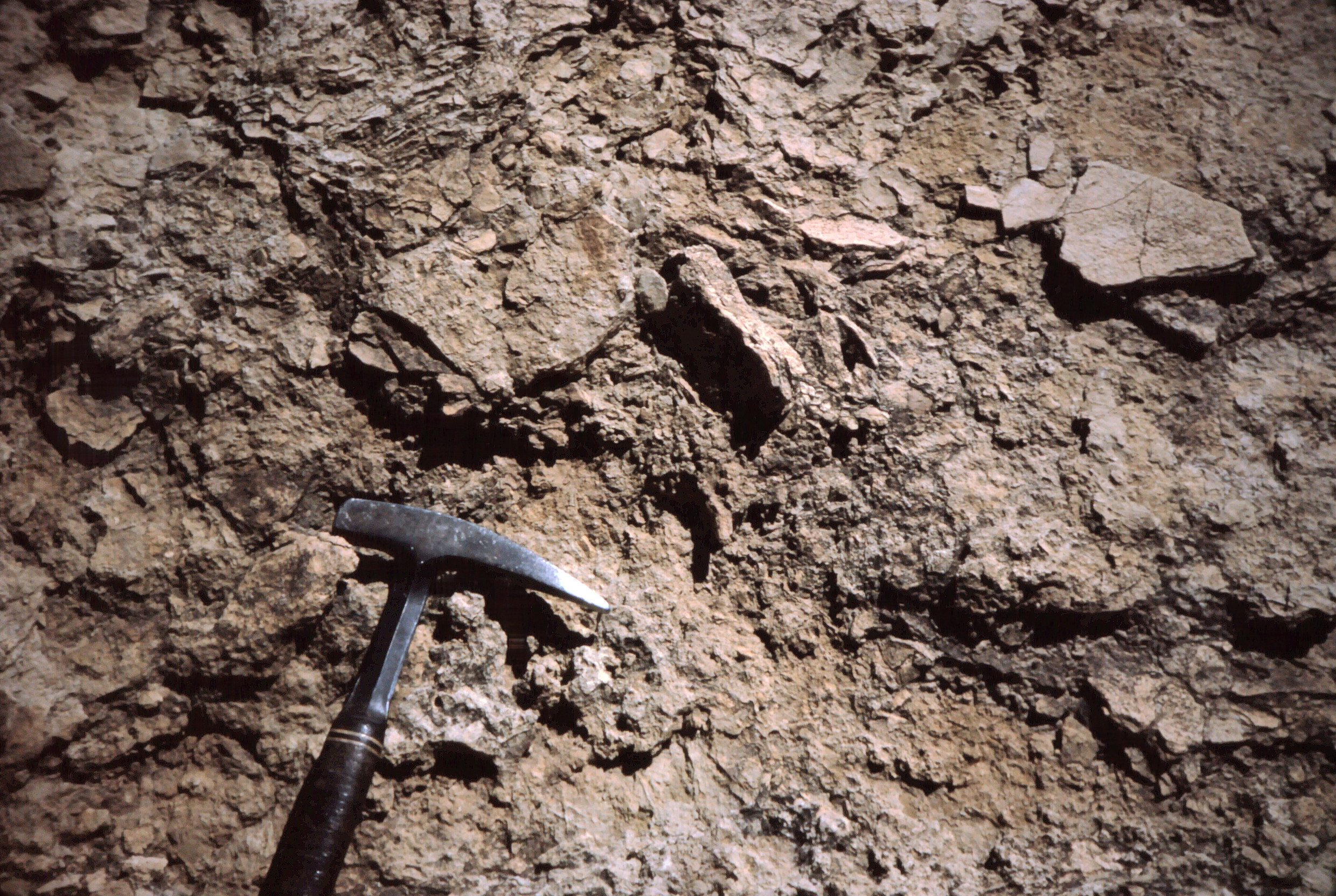
Hurricane breccia cemented on the surface of a bed, top of a "shallowing upward" cycle. Middle Lias, High Atlas.

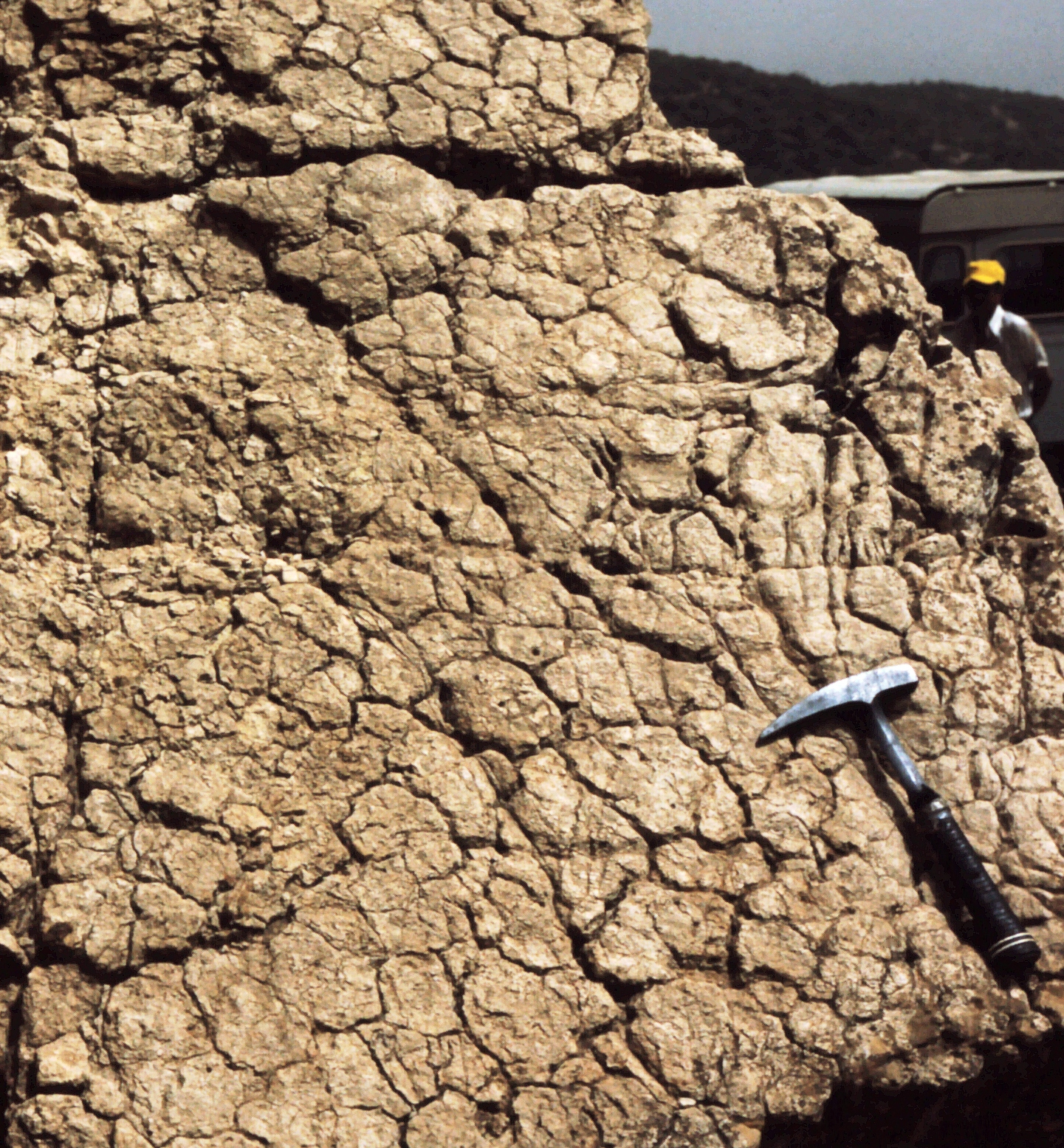
Top of a metric regressive cycle with desiccations, surface of bed dolomitised. Middle liassic of the High Atlas, Morocco.

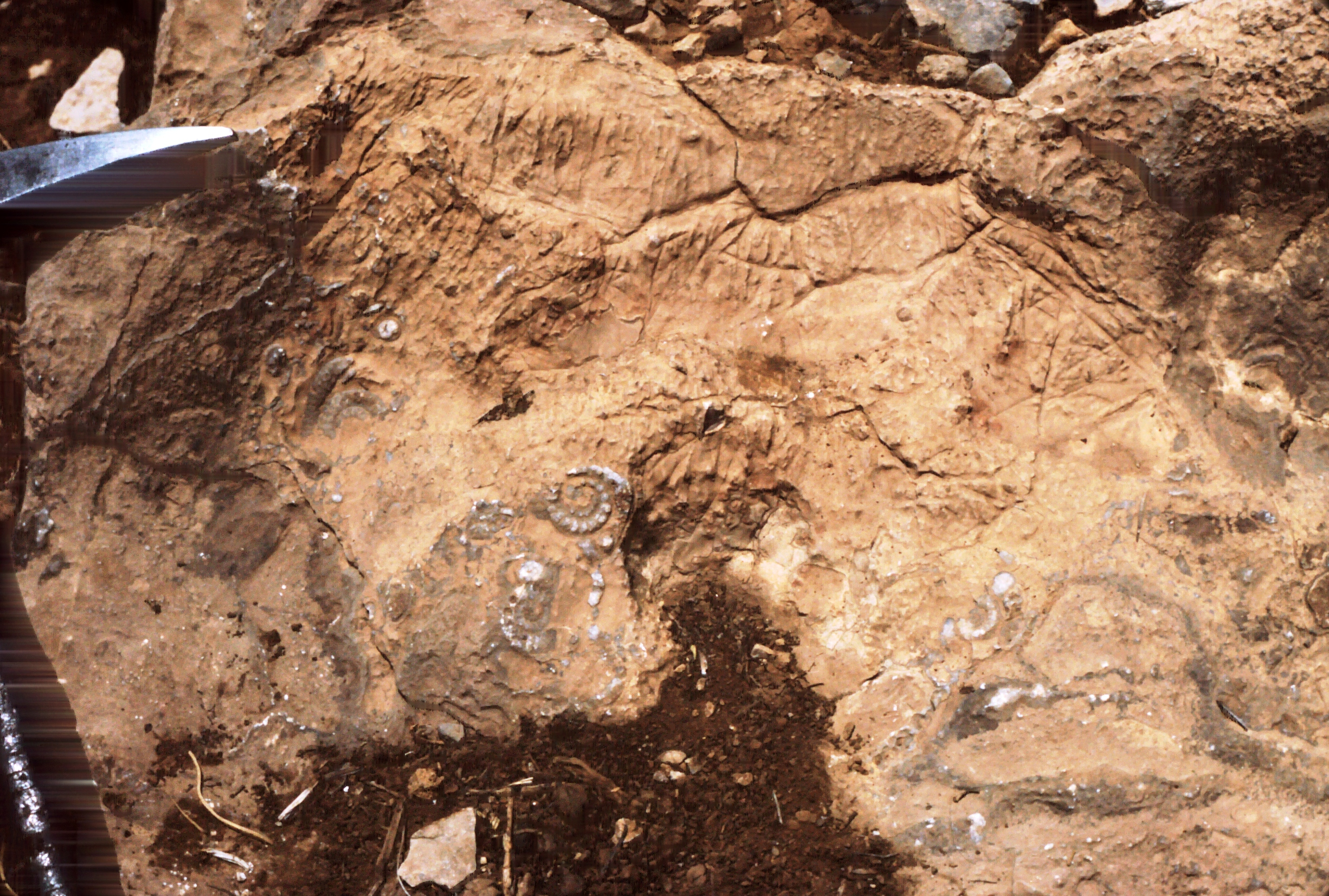
Washover, ammonites and belemnites (by storms) on top of a regressive cycle, supratidal environment. Middle liassic of the High Atlas, Morocco.

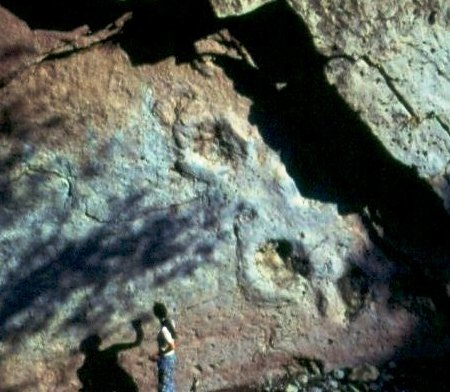
Giant dinosaur tracks, in a muddy sediment on top of a metric regressive cycle. Middle liassic, High Atlas, Morocco.

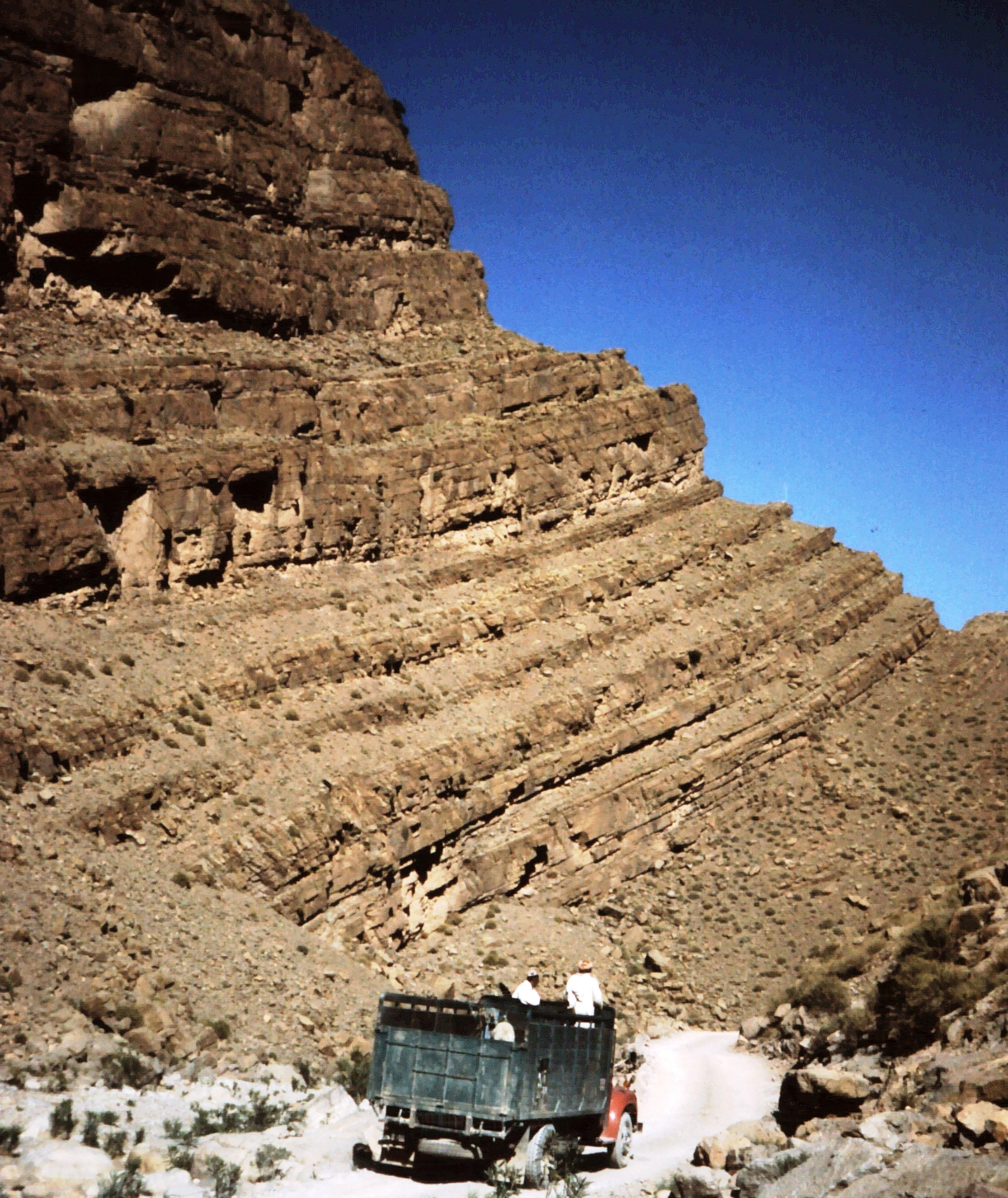
Metric to hectometric regressive cycles (related to an acceleration of the rate of subsidence); South of the High Atlas, Morocco.

== Problem with the cyclic sediments' study ==
The debate about the causes of cyclic sedimentation has been contentious in the past, and it remains unresolved. Sequence stratigraphy, the study of sea level change through the examination of sedimentary deposits, was developed from the centuries-old controversy over the origin of cyclic sedimentation and the relative importance of eustatic and tectonic factors on sea level change.

Another problem with the study of cyclic sediments is that different researchers have different criteria with which they identify cycles and the surfaces that separate the sedimentary layers within the cycles. There is also not a consistent terminology and classification scheme to describe the nature of the cycles seen in the stratigraphic record. This is mainly because absolute age dating is not precise enough at present.

== Peritidal Cycles ==
A Peritidal sedimentary cycle (or peritidal parasequence) is the typical result of the progradation of tidal flats on the lagoon, and may have an autocyclic or allocyclic origin.

Thick successions of peritidal carbonates are deposited in shallow-water environments within, below and just above the tidal range. Many ancient and modern carbonate platforms are characterised by this kind of deposition.

One of the fundamental properties of carbonate peritidal successions is the arrangement of subtidal, intertidal and supratidal facies into asymmetric, shallowing-upwards cyclothems or parasequences (Hardie & Shinn, 1986)

== Ginsburg model ==
The Ginsburg model deals with the cyclic successions in the specific case of a tidal flat and lagoon, introducing the important concept that carbonate peritidal cycles may form without external forcing.

Ginsburg (1971) suggested that asymmetric, shallowing-upward parasequences could be produced under conditions of steady subsidence and constant eustatic sea level by landward transport of carbonate sediment from subtidal zones, leading to progradation of inter- and supratidal zones. Continuing progradation reduces the size of the productive subtidal area, thus reducing sediment supply until it cannot keep pace with subsidence. When the area subsides and becomes supratidal once again, the inter- and supratidal areas are re-flooded starting a new cycle.

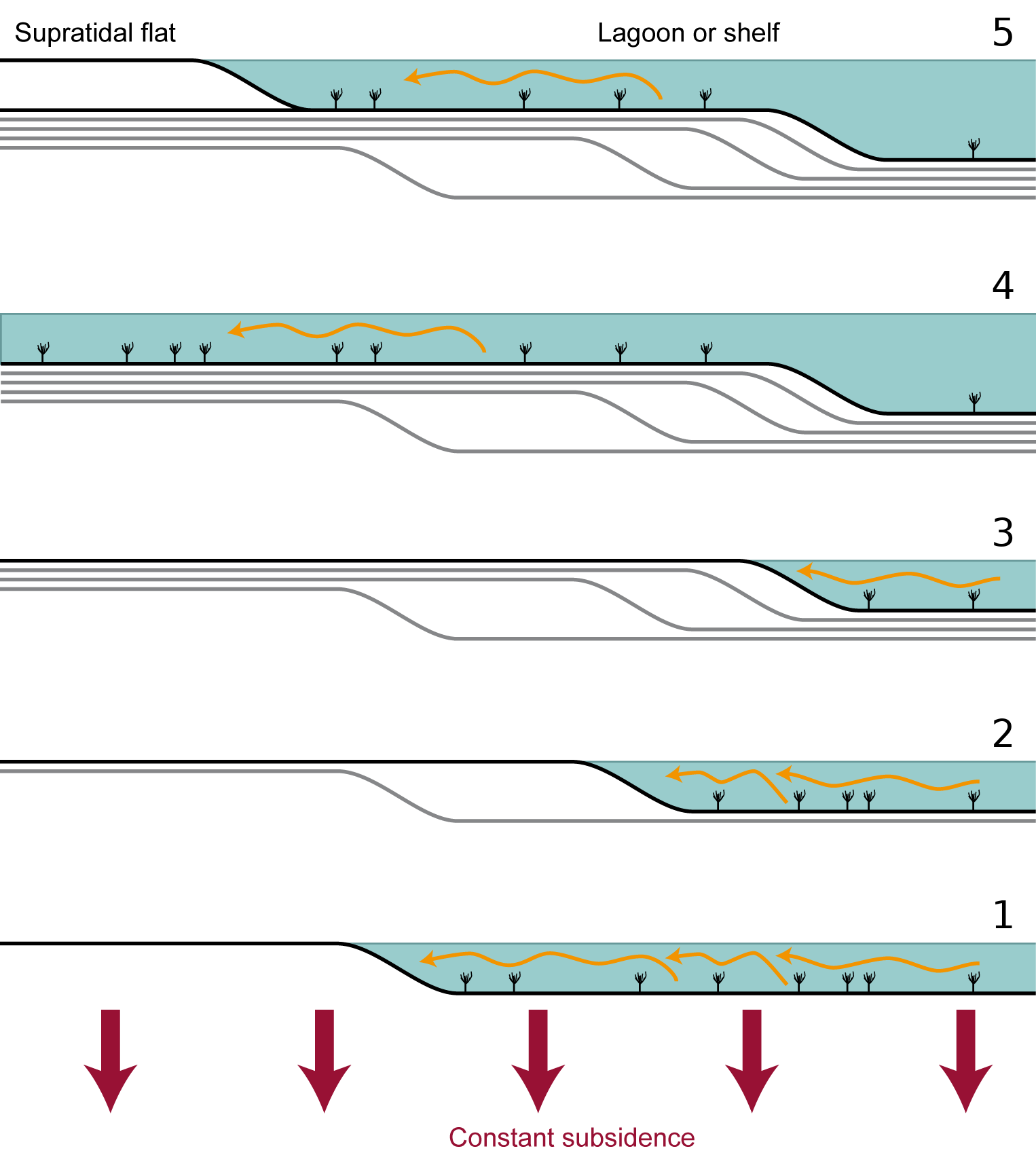
The Ginsburg model for the generation of autocycles in carbonate tidal flats and lagoons.

The model was developed on the base of the examples of the Florida lagoon and the tidal flats of the Bahamas. The Florida Bay lagoon and the tidal flats of the Bahamas and Persian Gulf are traps for fine sediment produced on the large adjacent open platforms or shelves they face. Carbonate mud is produced by precipitation and by the disintegration of organic skeletons in the extensive source areas. Then it moves shoreward by wind-driven, tidal or estuarine-like circulation, and is deposited thanks to the stabilization of marine plants and animals. Since many times the open marine source areas are larger than the nearshore traps, due to the lack of accommodation space, the sediments' wedge inevitably progrades seaward. This seaward progradation gives a regressive cycle from open marine shelf or platform to supratidal flat. As consequences, the size of the open marine source area decreases and the production of mud is reduced and no longer exceeds slow continuous subsidence. Carbonate mud accumulation stops, and a new transgression begins. When the source area expands so that production again exceeds subsidence, a new regressive cycle starts.

Ginsburg's assumption is to consider the constant and continuous subsidence in the Bahamas area (passive margins) and to idealize an almost horizontal slope.

A synthetic scheme may be useful for the whole comprehension of the model (see the picture):

1. The carbonate mud produced in the shelf (in the hinterland and also in the lagoon) is moved towards the land.
2. A supratidal flat forms and progrades, as carbonate production exceeds subsidence.
3. Carbonate production diminishes, because the productive subtidal shelf gets smaller, until it cannot anymore contrast constant subsidence. A transgression floods the top of the previous supratidal flat and new producers start to grow.
4. All over again, as long as constant subsidence continues.
5. A stack of regressive peritidal cycles bounded by flooding surfaces (parasequences) is created, with constant sea level and constant subsidence: a fully autocyclic process.
