= Geology of Great Britain =

Geology map of Great Britain. Key: Quaternary (Alluvium); Paleogene / Neogene (Tertiary); Cretaceous; Lower Cretaceous; middle/upper Jurassic; lower Jurassic; upper Triassic; lower Triassic; upper Permian; lower Permian; upper Carboniferous (Coal Measures); middle Carboniferous; lower Carboniferous (limestone); Devonian; Ordovician / Silurian; Cambrian; Neoproterozoic; Proterozoic (upper Precambrian); Lewisian (lower Precambrian); granite; Paleogene volcanics

The geology of Great Britain is renowned for its diversity. As a result of its eventful geological history, Great Britain shows a rich variety of landscapes across the constituent countries of England, Wales and Scotland. Rocks of almost all geological ages are represented at outcrop, from the Archaean onwards.

== Overview ==
Seismographic research shows that the crust of the Earth below Great Britain is from 27 to 35 km (17 to 22 mi) thick. The oldest surface rocks are found in northwest Scotland and are more than half as old as the planet. These rocks are thought to underlie much of Great Britain (although boreholes have only penetrated the first few kilometres), but next appear extensively at the surface in Brittany and the Channel Islands. The youngest rocks are found in southeast England.

=== Bedrock and past volcanism ===
The bedrock geology consists of a complex mix of generally older metamorphic rocks overlain by varying sequences of sedimentary rocks into both of which igneous rocks have been intruded at different times. The complexity of Great Britain's geology is due ultimately to its being subject to a variety of plate tectonic processes over a very extended period of time. Changing latitude and sea levels have been important factors in the nature of sedimentary sequences, while successive continental collisions have affected its geological structure with major faulting and folding being a legacy of each orogeny (mountain-building period), often associated with volcanic activity and the metamorphism of existing rock sequences.

Great Britain does not have any active volcanoes now, but has had an active volcanic past. The last active volcanoes stopped erupting about 60 million years ago and the islands are no longer located upon any tectonic boundary or active volcanic region, nor are there other geological phenomena in the island group able to give rise to active volcanism. However, on a geological timescale, a considerable degree of active and large-scale volcanism occurred in Great Britain, and many famous landmarks are formed of the eroded igneous rocks formed during these orogenies (mountain-building periods). The British Geological Survey lists Snowdonia and the Lake District as having extremely large volcanic eruptions around 450 Ma (million years ago), Edinburgh Castle lying upon the remains of a volcano dating back 350 Ma, and some islands of western Scotland as being remnants of volcanoes from around 60 Ma.

=== Superficial deposits ===
Overlain on this bedrock geology ("solid geology" in the terminology of maps) is a varied distribution of unconsolidated material of more recent origin. It includes material deposited by glaciers (boulder clay and other forms of glacial drift such as sand and gravel). "Drift" geology is often more important than "solid" geology when considering building works, drainage, siting water boreholes, sand and gravel resources and soil fertility. Although "drift" strictly refers to glacial and fluvio-glacial deposits, the term on geological maps has traditionally included other materials including alluvium, river terraces, etc. Recent maps use the terms "bedrock" and "superficial" in place of "solid" and "drift".

== Geological history ==
This description of the geological history of Great Britain is based on that of P. Toghill.

=== Precambrian ===
==== Archaean eon ====
The Lewisian gneiss, the oldest rocks in Great Britain, date from at least 2.7 billion years ago in the Archaean eon, the Earth itself being about 4.6 billion years old. They are found in the far north west of Scotland and in the Hebrides, with a few small outcrops elsewhere. Formed from rock originally deposited at the surface of the planet, the rocks were later buried deep in the Earth's crust and metamorphosed into crystalline gneiss.

==== Proterozoic eon ====
South of the gneisses are a complex mixture of rocks forming the North West Highlands and Grampian Highlands in Scotland. These are essentially the remains of folded sedimentary rocks that were originally 25 km thick, deposited over the gneiss on what was then the floor of the Iapetus Ocean. The process started about 1,000 Ma, with a notable 7 km thick layer of Torridon Sandstone being deposited about 800 Ma, as well as the debris deposited by an ice sheet 670 Ma.

Palaeomagnetic evidence indicates that 520 Ma, what is now Great Britain was split between two continents, separated by 7,000 km (4,300 mi) of ocean. The north of Scotland was located at about 20° south of the equator on the continent of Laurentia near the Tropic of Capricorn, while the rest of the country was at about 60° south on the continent of Gondwana near the Antarctic Circle.

In Gondwana, England and Wales were near a subduction zone. Both countries were largely submerged under a shallow sea studded with volcanic islands. The remains of these islands underlie much of central England with small outcrops visible in many places. Around 600 Ma, the Cadomian Orogeny (mountain building period) caused the English and Welsh landscape to be transformed into a mountainous region, along with much of north west Europe.

=== Palaeozoic era ===
==== Cambrian period ====
In the early Cambrian period, the volcanoes and mountains of England and Wales were eroded as the land became flooded by a rise in sea level, and new layers of sediment were laid down. Much of central England formed a stable block of crust, which has remained largely undeformed ever since. Sandstones were deposited in the north of Scotland. The first animals with hard shells evolved at this time, consequently, fossils become much more common in rocks formed during this and later periods.

==== Ordovician period ====
Five hundred million years ago, in the Ordovician period, southern Great Britain, the east coast of North America and south-east Newfoundland broke away from Gondwana to form the continent of Avalonia, which by 440 Ma had drifted (by the mechanisms of plate tectonics) to about 30° south.

During this period, north Wales was subject to volcanic activity. The remains of these volcanoes are still visible, one example of which is Rhobell Fawr dating from 510 Ma. Large quantities of volcanic lava and ash known as the Borrowdale Volcanics covered the Lake District and this can still be seen in the form of mountains such as Helvellyn and Scafell Pike.

The Ordovician also saw the formation of the Skiddaw slate deposits around 500 Ma.

==== Silurian period ====
Deposition continued into the early part of the Silurian period, with mudstones and sandstones being laid down, notably in Wales.

Avalonia had now joined with the continent of Baltica, and the combined landmass collided with Laurentia at about 20° south between 425 and 400 Ma, joining the southern and northern halves of Great Britain together. The resulting Caledonian Orogeny produced an Alpine-style mountain range in much of north and west Great Britain. The continental collision was probably at an oblique angle rather than a head-on collision, and this probably led to movement along strike-slip faults trending north-east to south-west across Scotland, the Great Glen Fault being the best example (some of these fault zones may have been old lines of weakness from earlier earth movements).

Volcanic ashes and lavas deposited during the Silurian are still found in the Mendip Hills and in Pembrokeshire.

==== Devonian period ====
The Old Red Sandstone Continent in the Devonian

The collision between continents continued during the Devonian period, with continuing uplift, and more volcanic deposits such as those now forming Ben Nevis. Sea levels varied considerably, with the coastline advancing and retreating from north to south across England. The uplifted region was gradually eroded down, resulting in the deposition of numerous sedimentary rock layers in lowlands and seas. The rocks of marine origin in the county of Devon gave the period its name, though deposits of this age are found in many other places, such as the Brecon Beacons, the Midland Valley of Scotland, and the Orkney Islands. Most of these are of terrestrial origin and are informally known as the Old Red Sandstone.

The Caledonian mountains had largely been eroded away by the end of the period during which the country would have experienced an arid desert climate as it was located close to the equator at between 10° and 15° south.

==== Carboniferous period ====
Around 360 Ma, at the start of the Carboniferous period, Great Britain was lying at the equator, covered by the warm shallow waters of the Rheic Ocean, during which time the Carboniferous Limestone was deposited, as found in the Mendip Hills, north and south Wales, in the Peak District of Derbyshire, north Lancashire, the northern Pennines and southeast Scotland. Caves developed more recently in the limestone of some of these areas by the action of carbonic acid and other organic acids in rainwater and groundwater.

These were followed by dark marine shales, siltstones, and coarse sandstones of the Millstone Grit. Later, river deltas formed and the sediments deposited were colonised by swamps and rain forest. It was in this environment that the cyclic Coal Measures were formed, the source of the majority of Great Britain's extensive coal reserves that powered the Industrial Revolution. Coal can be found in many areas of Great Britain, as far north as the Midland Valley of Scotland, as far south as Kent, although coal mining has largely been concentrated in the Scottish Midlands, English Midlands, northern England and Wales.

Throughout the period, southwest England in particular was affected by the collision of continental plates. The mountain building period known as the Variscan orogeny, which occurred around 280 Ma, caused major deformation in south west England. Towards the end of this period granite was formed beneath the overlying rocks of Devon and Cornwall, now exposed at Dartmoor and Bodmin Moor, giving rise to mineralised deposits of copper and tin. The general region of Variscan folding was south of an east–west line roughly from south Pembrokeshire to Kent. The main tectonic pressure was from the south or south-east, and there developed dextral strike-slip faulting. The Devon-Cornwall massif may originally have been some distance further east, then to be moved westwards. Lesser Variscan folding took place as far north as Derbyshire and Berwick-upon-Tweed.

By the end of the Carboniferous period, the various continents of the Earth had fused to form the super-continent of Pangaea. Great Britain was located in the interior of Pangea, where it was again subject to a hot arid desert climate with frequent flash floods leaving deposits that formed beds of red sedimentary rock, somewhat similar to the later, Triassic New Red Sandstone.

==== Permian period ====
The Permian was characterised for 30 million years by arid desert conditions and the erosion of the land that had uplifted in the Variscan Orogeny, southwest England and adjacent areas of the present-day English Channel. Later, much of Great Britain was submerged in shallow waters as the polar ice sheets melted and the Tethys Ocean and Zechstein Sea formed, depositing shale, limestone, gravel, and marl, before finally receding to leave a flat desert with salt pans.

=== Mesozoic era ===
==== Triassic period ====
As Pangaea drifted during the Triassic, Great Britain moved away from the equator until it was between 20° and 30° north. Red beds, including sandstones and red mudstones form the main sediments of the New Red Sandstone. The remnants of the Variscan uplands in France to the south were eroded down, resulting in layers of the New Red Sandstone being deposited across central England, and in faulted basins in Cheshire and the Irish Sea. A basin developed in the Hampshire region around this time. Rifting occurred within and around Great Britain, prior to the breakup of the super-continent in the Jurassic period.

Rock fragments found near Bristol appear to indicate that, in 214 Ma, Great Britain was showered with a fine layer of debris from an asteroid impact at the Manicouagan Impact Crater in Canada, although this is still being debated.

==== Jurassic period ====
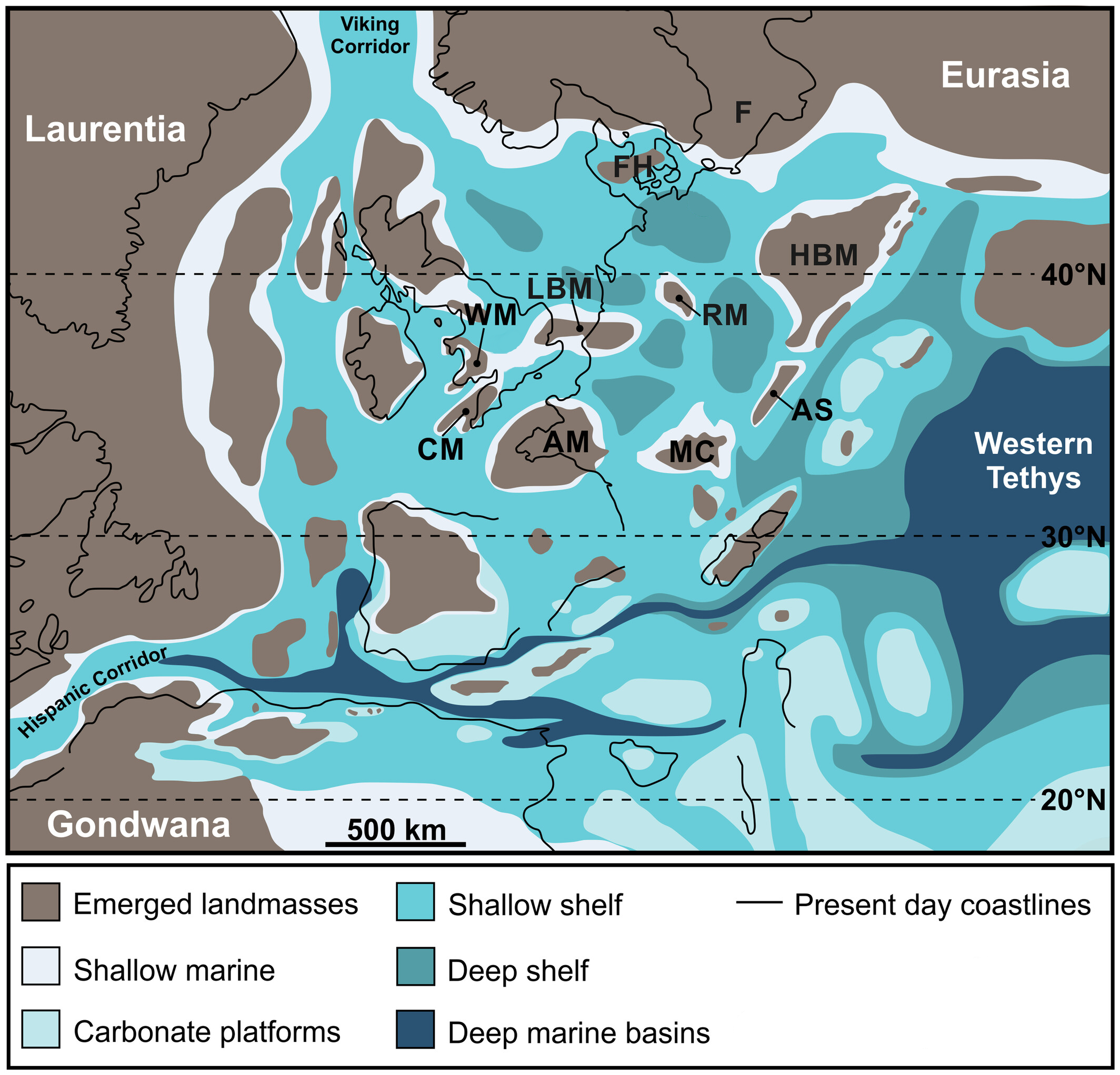
Map of Europe during the Toarcian age of the Early Jurassic

As the Jurassic period began, Pangaea began to break up, sea levels rose and Great Britain drifted on the Eurasian Plate to between 30° and 40° north. With much of Great Britain under water again, sedimentary rocks were deposited and can now be found outcropping across much of England from the Cleveland Hills of Yorkshire to the Jurassic Coast in Dorset. They also underlie younger strata to the east. In Southern England, the Jurassic rocks are subdivided upwards as the Lias, Inferior Oolite, Great Oolite, Ancholme (interfingering with Corallian) and Portland groups. These rock units include sandstones, greensands, oolitic limestone of the Cotswold Hills, corallian limestone of the Vale of White Horse and the Isle of Portland.

==== Cretaceous period ====
Sedimentation would retreat from most of England beginning in the Cretaceous, with the deposition of the lagoonal Purbeck and primarily freshwater Wealden groups being largely confined to the Wessex and Weald basins, with marine units, including the Speeton Clay, occurring in eastern England. The Aptian saw a marine transgression that flooded most areas of southern England, into shallow seas, with the successive deposition of the Lower Greensand and Gault and Upper Greensand occurring in the Aptian-Albian. At the beginning of the Late Cretaceous, around 100 million years ago, deposition changed to that of chalk, with the deposition of the Chalk Group continuing until the end of the Cretaceous. Chalk was deposited over much of Great Britain, now notably exposed at the White Cliffs of Dover and the Seven Sisters, and also forming Salisbury Plain. The high sea levels left only small areas of land exposed, which accounts for the general lack of land-origin sand, mud or clay sediments found from around this time.

=== Cenozoic era ===
==== Palaeogene period ====
In the early Palaeogene period, between 63 and 52 Ma, the last volcanic rocks in Great Britain were formed. The major eruptions at this time produced the Antrim Plateau, the basaltic columns of the Giant's Causeway and the lavas and igneous intrusions of the Inner Hebrides of Scotland.

An early phase of the Alpine Orogeny, about 50 Ma, was responsible for the shaping of the London Basin syncline, the Weald-Artois Anticline to the south, the North Downs, South Downs and Chiltern Hills.

During the period, the North Sea formed and Great Britain was uplifted. Some of this uplift was along old lines of weakness left from the Caledonian and Variscan Orogenies long before. The uplifted areas were then eroded, and further sediments, such as the London Clay, were deposited over southern England, while the English Channel was characterised by mud flats and river-deposited sands. Much of the midlands and north of England may have been covered by Jurassic and Cretaceous deposits at the start of the Palaeogene, but these were lost through erosion. By 35 Ma, the landscape was colonised by trees such as beech, oak, redwood and palm, along with grasses.

==== Neogene period ====
===== Miocene and Pliocene epochs =====
In the Miocene and Pliocene epochs of the Neogene, further uplift and erosion occurred, particularly in Wales, the Pennines, and the Scottish Highlands. The only significant Miocene deposit in Great Britain is the Brassington Formation in the Peak District. Evidence from the Brassington Formation suggests that, in the middle and late Miocene (12 to 7 million years ago) a diverse warm-temperate forest grew in the UK. The oldest Neogene sediments have been reported from Wales and include fossil pollen that shows a subtropical mixed forest once grew on Anglesey. The climate of the UK cooled and became drier throughout the Neogene

==== Quaternary period ====
===== Pleistocene epoch =====
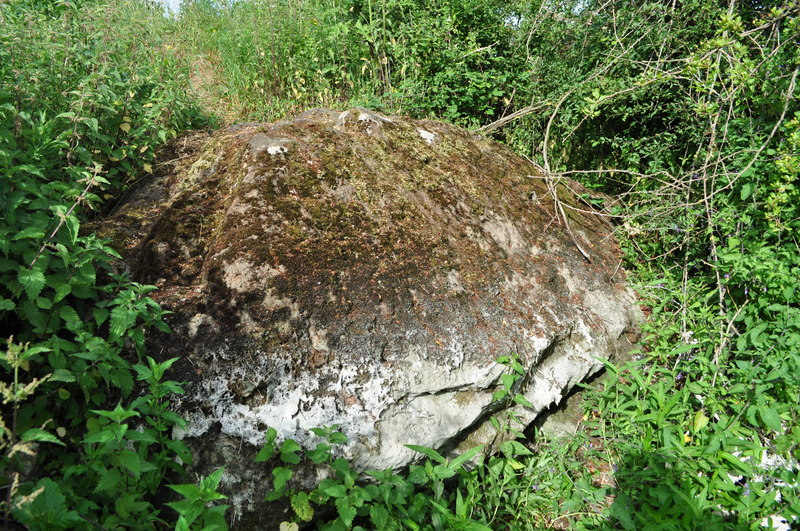
The Merton Stone, one of the largest glacial erratics in England

The major changes during the Pleistocene were brought about by several recent ice ages. The most severe was the Anglian Glaciation, with ice up to 1,000 metres (3,300 feet) thick that reached as far south as London and Bristol. This took place between about 478,000 to 424,000 years ago, and was responsible for the diversion of the River Thames onto its present course.

There is extensive evidence in the form of stone tools that southern England was colonised by human populations during the warm Hoxnian Stage that followed the Anglian Glaciation. It is possible that the English Channel repeatedly opened and closed during this period, causing Great Britain to become an island from time to time. The oldest human fossils found to date in the British Isles, which include the skull of Swanscombe Man from 400,000 years ago, and the earlier Clactonian Man, also date from this period.

The Wolstonian Glaciation, between about 352,000 to 130,000 years ago, which is thought to have peaked around 150,000 years ago, was named after the village of Wolston southeast of Coventry which is thought to mark the southern limit of the ice.

The Wolstonian Stage was followed by the Ipswichian Stage, during which hippopotamus are known to have lived as far north as Leeds.

During the most recent Devensian glaciation, which is thought to have started around 115,000 years ago, peaked around 20,000 years ago and ended a mere 10,000 years ago, the Usk valley and Wye valley were eroded by glaciers, with the icesheet itself reaching south to Wolverhampton and Cardiff. The oldest human remains in Great Britain, the Red Lady of Paviland (29,000 years old), date from this time. It is thought that the country was eventually abandoned as the ice sheet reached its peak, being recolonised as it retreated. By 5,000 years ago, it is thought that Great Britain was warmer than it is at present.

Among the features left behind by the ice are the fjords of the west coast of Scotland, the U-shaped valleys of the Lake District and erratics (blocks of rock) that have been transported from the Oslo region of Norway and deposited on the coast of Yorkshire.

===== Holocene epoch =====
The last twelve thousand years are known as the Holocene Epoch. Amongst the most significant geological features created during this period are the peat deposits of Scotland, and of coastal and upland areas of England and Wales. Many of the lowland deposits, such as the Somerset Levels, The Fens and Romney Marsh have recently been artificially drained.

Since humans began clearing the forest during the New Stone Age, most of the land has now been deforested, speeding the natural processes of erosion. Large quantities of stone, gravel and clay are extracted each year, and by 2000 11% of England was covered by roads or buildings.

At the present time, Scotland is continuing to rise as a result of the weight of Devensian ice being lifted. Southern and eastern England is sinking, generally estimated at 1 mm (1/25 inch) per year, with the London area sinking at double the speed partly due to the continuing compaction of the recent clay deposits.

In addition, rises in sea level thought to be due to global warming appear likely to make low-lying areas of land increasingly susceptible to flooding, while in some areas the coastline continues to erode at a geologically rapid rate.

Great Britain continues to be subject to several very minor earthquakes each month, and more occasional light to moderate ones. During the 20th century, 25 earthquakes with a moment magnitude of 4.5 to 6.1 were felt, many of them originating within the Isles themselves.

== Geological features ==
- Cheddar Gorge – the largest gorge in Great Britain
- Jurassic Coast – a UNESCO World Heritage Site
- Great Glen Fault
- Highland Boundary Fault
- Southern Uplands Fault
- Midland Valley of Scotland
- Fingal's Cave – columnar Tertiary basaltic formation (similar to the Giant's Causeway in Northern Ireland)
- Salisbury Plain
- Tees–Exe line
- Whin Sill
- Siccar Point in Berwickshire provided early proof of the immense age of the Earth.
- Moine Thrust – the first thrust belt to be recognised by geologists.
- London Basin
- Hampshire Basin
- North Downs
- Weald
- South Downs
- London-Brabant Massif
- Cornubian batholith – Early Permian intrusion in the South West of England, forming moors where exposed at the surface, such as Dartmoor
- Lizard Complex – a piece of obducted oceanic crust, (i.e. an Ophiolite).
- Iapetus Suture – line of closure of the Iapetus suture.

== Geological resources ==
Great Britain's complex geology has provided it with a wide range of geological resources including abundant supplies of coal, the initial extraction of which powered the Industrial Revolution. During the 20th century, the exploitation of North Sea oil and gas provided further energy supplies for the nation. Geothermal energy and onshore oil have also been exploited to a lesser extent.

A wide variety of stone has been worked for building and general construction needs (e.g. sand and gravel) while other minerals have been mined or quarried for the chemical industry (e.g. salt), the production of metals (e.g. copper and tin) or other uses (e.g. china clay).

== Events ==
- Storegga Slides, caused a tsunami c. 6100 BC
- Garth tsunami 5,500 years ago
- 1607 Bristol Channel floods were caused by either a tsunami or a storm surge.
- 1580 Dover Straits earthquake
- 1755 Lisbon earthquake caused a tsunami that hit Cornwall
- 1884 Colchester earthquake
- 2008 Market Rasen earthquake

== Institutions ==
=== Government agencies ===
- British Geological Survey

=== Learned societies ===
- Geological Society of London
- Edinburgh Geological Society
- Royal Geological Society of Cornwall

== Pioneers of British geology ==
- Mary Anning 1799–1847
- Thomas George Bonney 1833–1923
- William Buckland 1784–1856
- William Conybeare 1787–1857
- James Hutton 1726–1797 the "Father of modern geology"
- Charles Lapworth 1842–1920
- Sir Charles Lyell 1797–1875
- Gideon Mantell 1790–1852
- Sir Roderick Murchison 1792–1871
- John Phillips 1800–1874
- Adam Sedgwick 1785–1873
- William Smith 1769–1839 the "Father of English geology"

== Awards ==
- Wollaston Medal

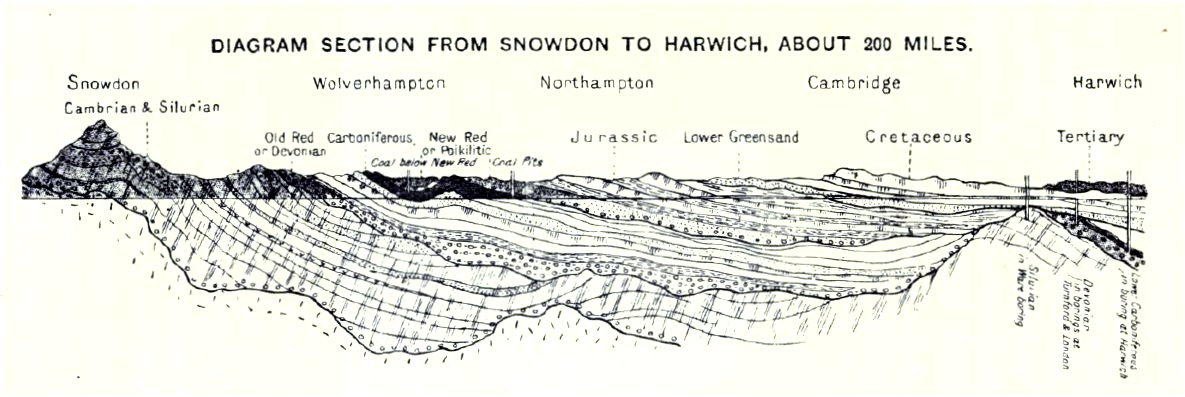
Geology of the UK: Section from Snowdon to Harwich showing underlying strata. This cross section shows what would be seen in a deep cutting nearly E. and W. across England and Wales. It shows also how, in consequence of the folding of the strata and the cutting off of the uplifted parts, old rocks which should be tens of thousands of feet down are found in borings in East Anglia only 1000 feet or so below the surface.

== See also ==
- Coastline of the United Kingdom
- Geologic time scale
- Geology of England
- Geology of Scotland
- Geology of Wales
- Gravity anomalies of Britain and Ireland
- List of earthquakes in the British Isles
- List of natural disasters in the United Kingdom
- List of rock formations in the United Kingdom
- List of shear zones of Great Britain
- List of volcanoes in the United Kingdom
- Tsunamis affecting the British Isles
