= Geology of England =

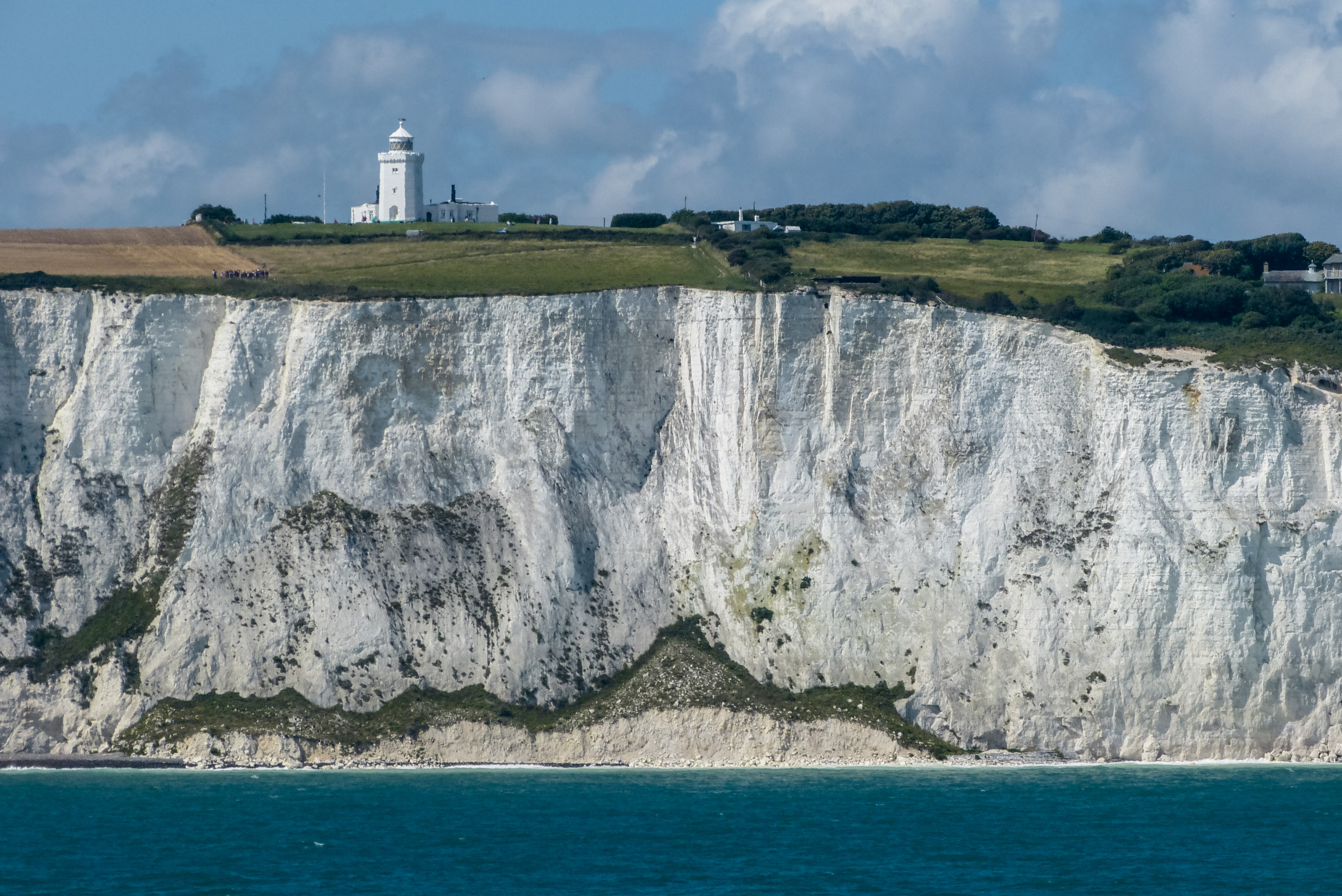
The White Cliffs of Dover, Kent, made of chalk of Cretaceous age

The geology of England is mainly sedimentary. The youngest rocks are in the south east around London, progressing in age in a north westerly direction. The Tees–Exe line marks the division between younger, softer and low-lying rocks in the south east and the generally older and harder rocks of the north and west which give rise to higher relief in those regions. The geology of England is recognisable in the landscape of its counties, the building materials of its towns and its regional extractive industries.

== Bedrock ==
The bedrock consists of many layers formed over vast periods of time. These were laid down in various climates as the global climate changed, the landmasses moved due to continental drift, and the land and sea levels rose or fell. From time to time horizontal forces caused the rock to undergo considerable deformation, folding the layers of rock to form mountains which have since been eroded and overlain with other layers. To further complicate the geology, the land has also been subject to periods of earthquakes and volcanic activity.

== Superficial deposits ==
Overlain on this bedrock or "solid" geology is a somewhat variable distribution of soils and fragmental material deposited by glaciers (boulder clay, and other forms of glacial drift in the geologically recent past. "Drift" geology is often more important than "solid" geology when considering building works, drainage, siting water boreholes, soil fertility, and many other issues.

Glaciation and the resulting glacial and fluvio-glacial deposition has had a major impact on the landscape of England covering many areas with a veneer of glacial till in the lower lying areas north of a line running from Bristol to London. In the Ribble valley, Lancashire in north west England the resulting drumlins are clearly visible. Cromer Ridge in East Anglia is a terminal moraine. Indeed, most of East Anglia is covered with glacial till which has produced its rich loamy soils. This unconsolidated material (it is not stuck tightly together) is very easily eroded hence the rapid rate of retreat of the coastline of this region.

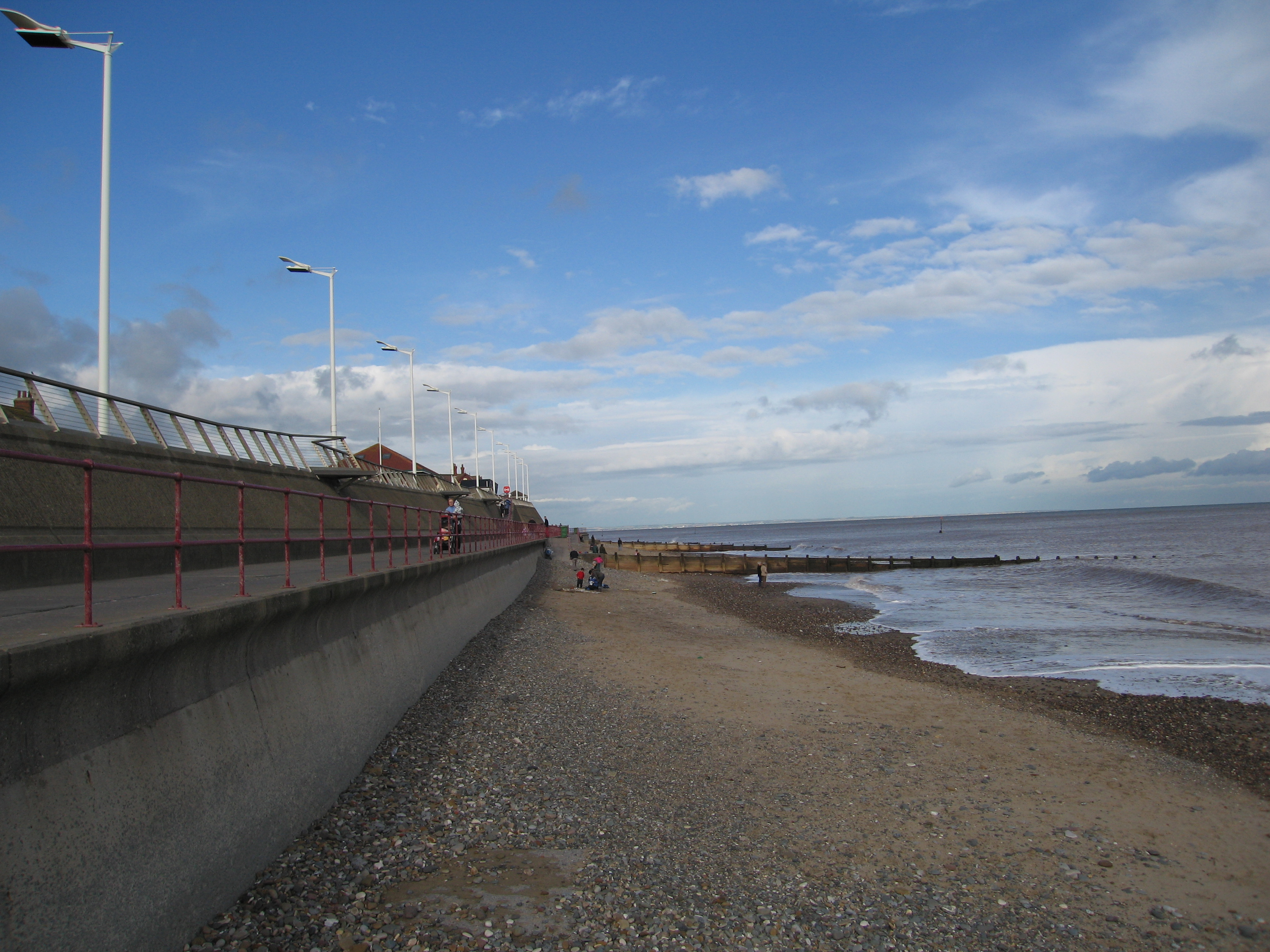
Hornsea where soft glacial deposits are suffering from coastal erosion

A similar situation exists in east Yorkshire in the Holderness district. The chalk outcrop at Flamborough Head in the north produces a headland relatively resistant to coastal erosion whilst the coastline south of this at such places as Mappleton and Hornsea with their soft glacial deposits are vulnerable.

Former ice caps did not reach south of the line running from Bristol to London, so this area has only been impacted by fluvio-glacial deposition which is represented in gravel beds around rivers such as the Thames. As the ice caps retreated northwards, more fluvio-glacial deposition occurred for example in the Vale of York

== Geological history ==
=== Precambrian supereon ===
No rocks earlier than the Proterozoic occur at surface within England.

==== Proterozoic eon ====
The Proterozoic lasted from (2,500–541 Ma). The early geological development of the Avalonia terrane, including England, is believed to have been in volcanic arcs near a subduction zone on the margin of the Gondwana continent. Some material may have accreted from volcanic island arcs which formed further out in the ocean and later collided with Gondwana as a result of plate tectonic movements. The igneous activity had started by 730 million years ago and continued until around 570 million years ago, resulting in a region of volcanic islands within a shallow sea. The remains of these islands underlie much of central England with small outcrops visible in various places.

Around 600 million years ago, the Cadomian Orogeny (mountain building period) created mountains in what would subsequently become England, along with much of north west Europe.

=== Phanerozoic eon ===
The Phanerozoic comprises the Palaeozoic, Mesozoic and Cenozoic eras, each of which are represented in English geology.

==== Palaeozoic era ====
The Palaeozoic comprises six periods from the Cambrian to the Permian (539–252 Ma).

===== Cambrian period =====
In the early Cambrian period the volcanoes and mountains of England were eroded as the land became flooded by a rise in sea level, and new layers of sediment were laid down. Cambrian shales laid down in a shallow sea are exposed in the Midlands at Nuneaton. Much of central England formed a stable block of crust which has remained largely undeformed ever since.

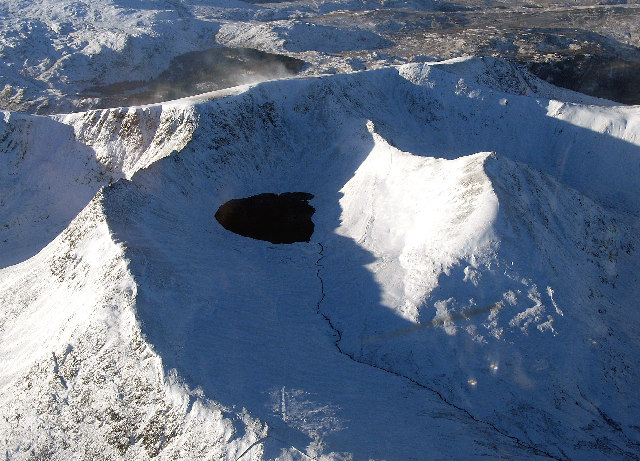
Helvellyn, a remnant of volcanic activity in the Lake District

===== Ordovician period =====
Five hundred million years ago, in the Ordovician period, southern Britain, the east coast of North America and south-east Newfoundland broke away from Gondwanaland to form the continent of Avalonia. The Skiddaw slates of the Lake District consist of metamorphosed marine sediments laid down on the northern margin of Avalonia.

Large quantities of volcanic lava and ash known as the Borrowdale Volcanics covered the Lake District, still seen in the form of mountains such as Helvellyn and Scafell Pike.

===== Silurian period =====
In the Silurian period, sandstones and mudstones were deposited in some parts of England. Volcanic ashes and lavas deposited during the period are still found in the Mendip Hills.

Avalonia had now joined with the continent of Baltica, and the combined landmass collided with Laurentia around 425 million years ago, joining the southern and northern halves of the British Isles together. The resulting Caledonian Orogeny produced an Alpine-style mountain range. England lay on the southern fringe of this range.

===== Devonian period =====
In the Devonian period, northern England was a region uplifted by the Caledonian Orogeny. The uplifted regions were gradually eroded down, resulting in the deposition of numerous sedimentary rock layers in lowlands and seas. The Old Red Sandstone was deposited across much of central and southern England. Sea levels varied considerably at this time with the coastline advancing and retreating from north to south across England. The Old Red Sandstone of Devon gave the period its name.

===== Carboniferous period =====
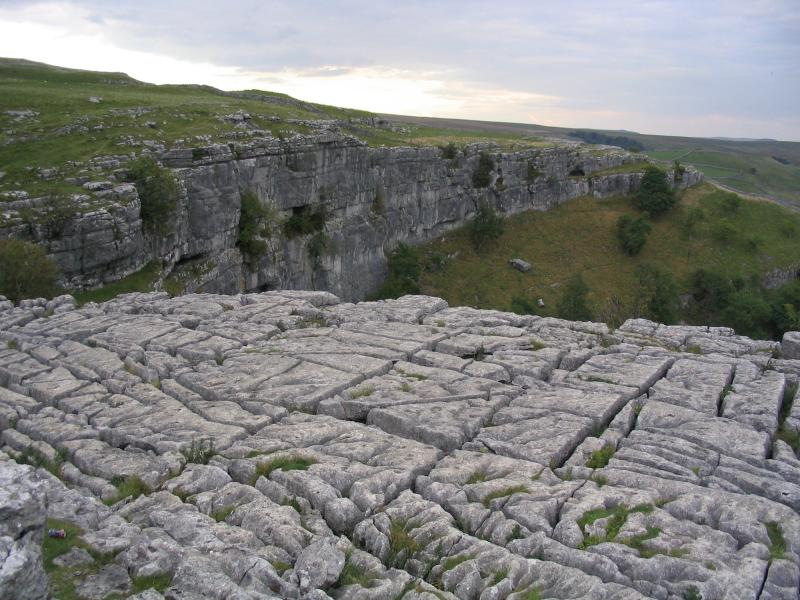
Limestone pavement above Malham Cove in part of the Yorkshire Dales formed of Carboniferous limestone

Around 360 million years ago during the Carboniferous period, England was lying at the equator, covered by the warm shallow waters of the Rheic Ocean. During this time Carboniferous Limestone was deposited, as found in the Mendip Hills, in the Peak District of Derbyshire, north Lancashire and the northern Pennines. The erosion of this landscape by carbonation has led to very distinctive scenery. Particularly notable is the area around Malham in the Yorkshire Dales with its limestone pavements, sink holes and shake holes. Gaping Gill contains a waterfall disappearing underground into the Carboniferous limestone.

The formation of Carboniferous Limestone was followed by the deposition of dark marine shales, siltstones and coarse sandstones of the Millstone Grit, notably in the area later uplifted to form the Pennine anticline. This sequence can be seen in the Yorkshire Dales with Ingleborough protruding up above the Carboniferous Limestone landscape below.

Later, river deltas formed and the sediments deposited were colonised by swamps and rain forest. It was in this environment that the cyclic coal measures were formed. Coal can be found as far south as Kent with deposits stretching northwards to Tyne and Wear; though coal has largely been mined in the Midlands and northern England. One of the best exposures of the Coal Measures is on the north east coast between Whitley Bay and Seaton Sluice.

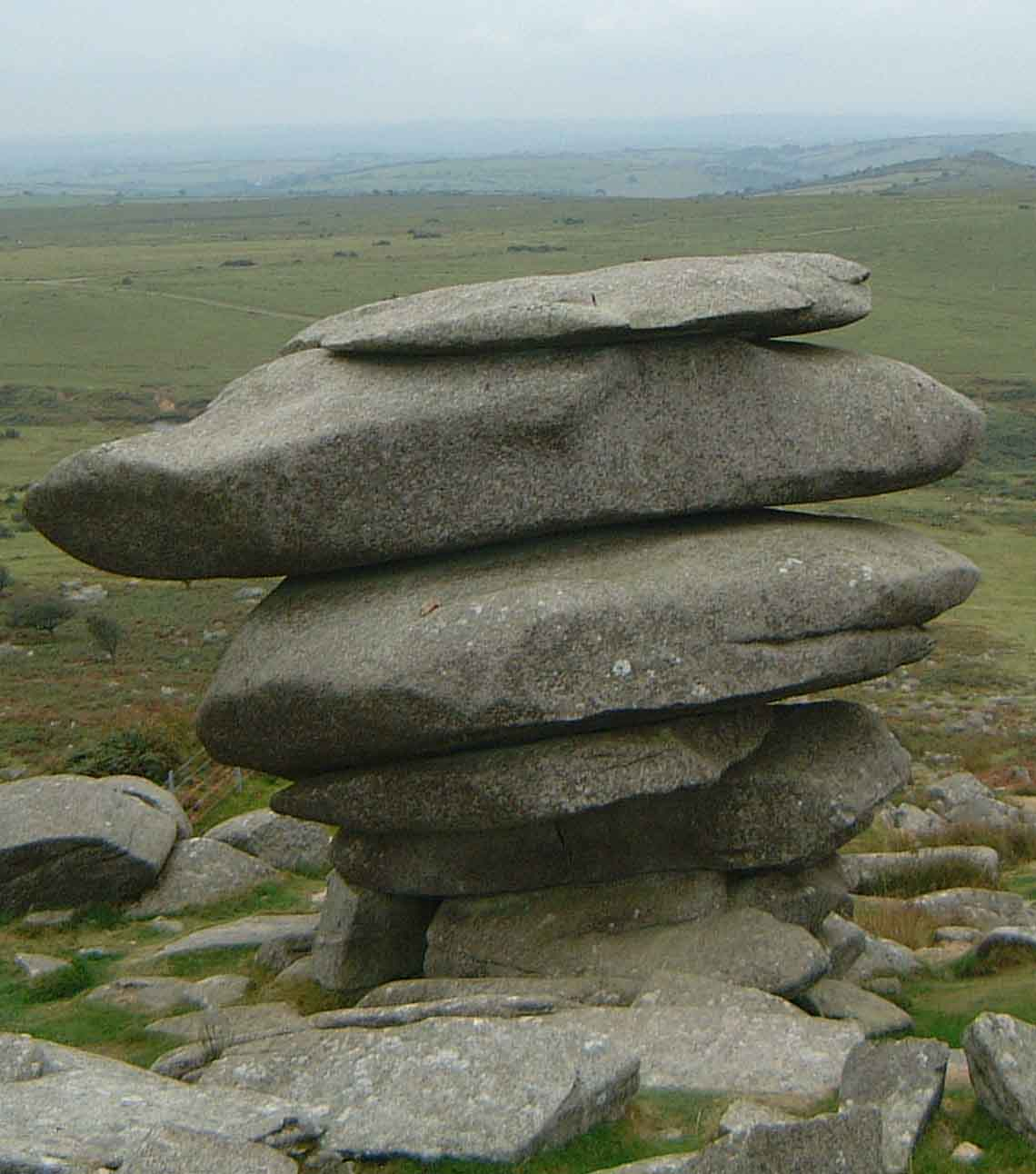
The Cheesewring, a granite tor on the southern edge of Bodmin Moor

===== Variscan Orogeny =====
Around 280 million years ago, at the close of the Carboniferous period, the Variscan orogeny (mountain building period) caused major deformation in south west England. The general region of Variscan folding was south of an east–west line roughly from Avon to Kent, though lesser folding took place as far north as Derbyshire and Berwick-upon-Tweed. The main tectonic pressure was from the south or south-west.

Towards the end of the orogeny the emplacement of a large batholith of granite occurred below what is now Devon and Cornwall. This granite is now exposed as Dartmoor, Bodmin Moor and several other exposures in Cornwall, including the Isles of Scilly. Granite tors form important elements in the landscape in these areas. Metamorphism of the country rocks and hydrothermal circulation of metal-rich fluids in the cooling rock provided the source of the extensive metalliferous deposits of the region (primarily copper and tin). Later weathering of the granite led to deposits of kaolin which has been excavated as it is an important source of china clay and ball clay used in the production of such products as porcelain and shiny printing paper.

By the end of the period, England had a hot arid desert climate, with frequent flash floods leaving deposits that formed red beds, somewhat similar to the later, Triassic New Red Sandstone.

After the end of the Carboniferous period, an intrusion of quartz dolerite formed the Whin Sill. The River Tees flows over this at High Force on the Alston Block. Whin Sill is also seen again at Hadrian's Wall. The country rock is Lower Carboniferous limestone and shales.

===== Permian period =====
The Permian period was characterised for 30 million years by arid desert and erosion of the areas uplifted in the Variscan Orogeny (southwest England and adjacent areas in the present-day English Channel). Later, much of England was submerged in shallow waters as the polar ice sheets melted and the Tethys Ocean and Zechstein Sea formed, depositing shale, limestone, gravel, and marl, before finally receding to leave a flat desert with salt pans.

==== Mesozoic era ====
The Mesozoic comprises the Triassic, Jurassic and Cretaceous periods (252–66 Ma).

===== Triassic period =====
As Pangaea drifted during the Triassic period, England moved away from the equator until it was between 20° and 30° north. Red beds, including sandstones and red mudstones form the main sediments of the New Red Sandstone. The remnants of the Variscan uplands in France to the south were eroded down, resulting in layers of the New Red Sandstone being deposited across central England, and in faulted basins in Cheshire. A basin developed in the Hampshire region around this time. Rifting occurred within and around England, prior to the breakup of the super-continent in the Jurassic period.

Rock fragments found near Bristol appear to indicate that in 214 million years ago England was showered with a fine layer of debris from an asteroid impact at the Manicouagan Impact Crater in Canada (when both areas were parts of the Pangaea supercontinent), although this is still being debated.

===== Jurassic period =====
As the Jurassic period started, Pangaea began to break up and sea levels rose, as England drifted on the Eurasian Plate to between 30° and 40° north. With much of England under water again, sedimentary rocks were deposited and can now be found underlying much of southern England from the Cleveland Hills of Yorkshire to the Jurassic Coast in Dorset, including clays, sandstones, greensands, oolitic limestone of the Cotswold Hills, corallian limestone of the Vale of White Horse and the Isle of Portland. A particularly interesting Jurassic site is on the North Yorkshire coast between Staithes and Port Mulgrave.

The burial of algae and bacteria below the mud of the sea floor during this time resulted in the formation of North Sea oil and natural gas, much of it trapped in overlying sandstone by salt deposits formed as the seas fell to form the swamps and salty lakes and lagoons that were home to dinosaurs.

===== Cretaceous period =====
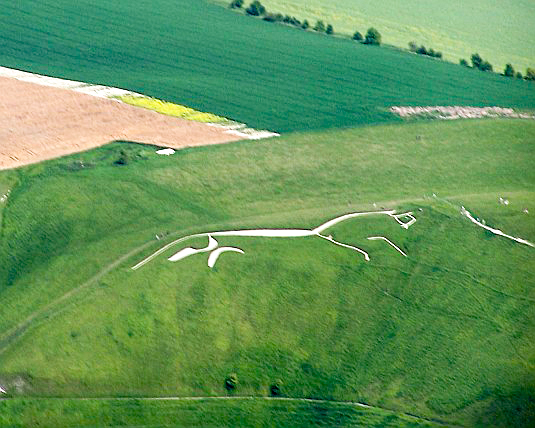
The Uffington White Horse carved in the chalk downland of southern England

After 20 million years during the Cretaceous period, the seas started to flood the land again until much of England was again below the sea, though sea levels frequently changed. Chalk and flints were deposited over much of England, now notably exposed at the White Cliffs of Dover and the Seven Sisters, and also forming Salisbury Plain. The high sea levels left only small areas of land exposed. This caused the general lack of land-origin sand, mud or clay sediments around this time – some of the late Cretaceous strata are almost pure chalk.

==== Cenozoic era ====
The Cenozoic comprises the Palaeogene, Neogene and Quaternary periods (66 Ma–present).

===== Palaeogene =====
In the early Palaeogene period between 63 and 52 million years ago, the last igneous rocks in England were formed. The granite Lundy Island in the Bristol Channel dates from this period.

The Alpine Orogeny that took place from about 50 million years ago was responsible for the shaping of the London Basin syncline and the Weald anticline to the south. This orogeny also led to the development of the North Downs, South Downs and Chiltern Hills escarpments, and the near-vertical folds in south Dorset and the Isle of Wight.

During the period England was uplifted leading to erosion and the formation of the Sub-Paleogene surface. Some of this uplift was along old lines of weakness from the Caledonian and Variscan orogenies long before. The uplifted areas were then eroded, and further sediments were deposited over southern England, including the London Clay, while the English Channel consisted of mud flats and river deposited sands. Much of the Midlands and north of England may have been covered by Jurassic and Cretaceous deposits at the start of the Palaeogene, but lost them through erosion. By 35 million years ago, the landscape included beech, oak, redwood and palm trees, along with grassland.

===== Neogene =====
In the Miocene and Pliocene epochs of the Neogene period, further uplift and erosion occurred, particularly in the Pennines. Plant and animal types developed into their modern forms, and by about 2 million years ago the landscape would have been broadly recognisable today.

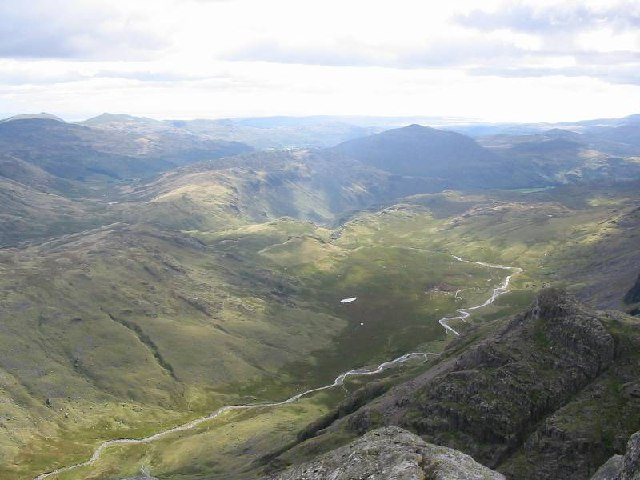
Eskdale from Ill Crag and the rest of the Lake District were affected by glaciation in the Pleistocene

===== Quaternary =====
The major changes during the Pleistocene epoch have been brought about by several recent ice ages. The most severe was the Anglian Stage, with ice up to 1,000 m (3300 ft) thick in the northwest which thinned considerably as it reached as far south as London and Bristol. This glaciation took place between about 500,000 to 400,000 years ago, and was responsible for the diversion of the River Thames onto its present course.

There is extensive evidence in the form of stone tools that southern England was colonised by human populations during the warm Hoxnian Stage period that followed the glaciation of the Anglian Stage. It is possible that the English Channel repeatedly opened and closed during this period, causing Britain to become an island from time to time. The oldest human fossils in these islands also date from this time, including the skull of Swanscombe Man from 250,000 years ago, and the earlier Clactonian Man.

Multiple glaciations occurred during Wolstonian Stage, between about 352,000 to 132,000 years ago. Thought to have peaked around 150,000 years ago, it was named after the town of Wolston south of Birmingham which is considered to mark the southern limit of the ice.

The Wolstonian Stage was followed by interglacial climate of the Ipswichian Stage, during which hippopotamus are known to have lived as far north as Leeds.

The most recent glaciations occurred during the Devensian Stage, which is thought to have started around 75,000 years ago, peaked around 20,000 years ago and ended a mere 11,500 years ago. The valleys of the Lake District and parts of the Pennines were further eroded by glaciers, with the ice sheet itself reaching south to Birmingham. It is thought that the country was eventually abandoned as the ice sheet reached its peak, being recolonised as it retreated. By 5,000 years ago it is thought that the British Isles were warmer than they are at present.

Among the features left behind by the ice are the glaciated U-shaped valleys of the Lake District and erratics (blocks of rock) that have been transported by ice, including some from the Oslo region and deposited on the coast of Yorkshire.

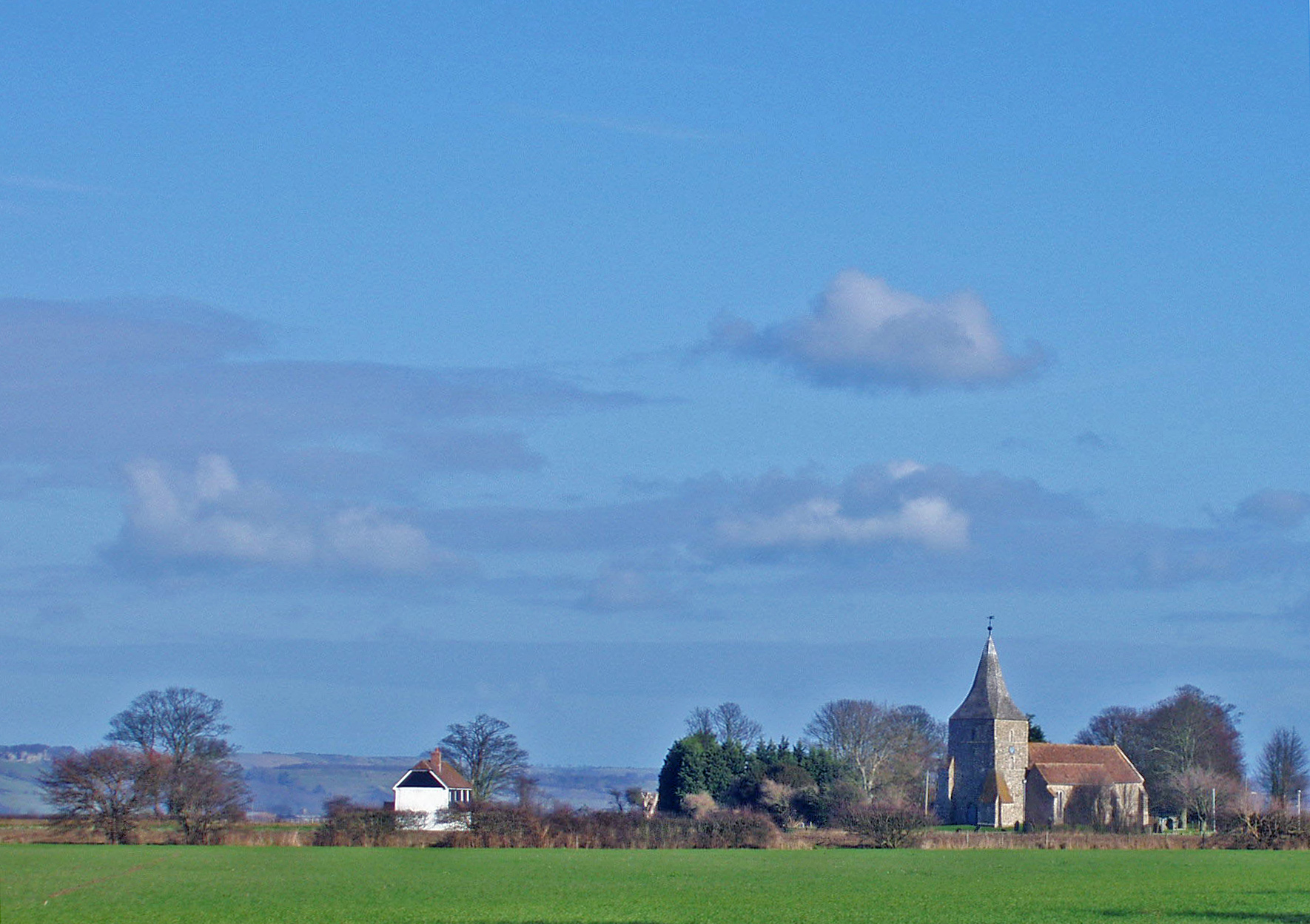
St Mary in the Marsh on the flat peat landscape of Romney Marsh

Over the last twelve thousand years during the Holocene epoch the most significant new geological features have been the deposits of peat, as well as in coastal areas that have recently been artificially drained such as the Somerset Levels, The Fens and Romney Marsh.

Since humans began clearing the forest during the New Stone Age, most of the land has now been deforested, speeding the natural processes of erosion. Large quantities of stone, gravel and clay are extracted each year, and by 2000 11% of England was covered by roads or buildings.

At the present time, due to Scotland's continuing to rise as a result of the weight of Devensian ice being lifted, England is sinking. This is generally estimated at 1 mm (1/25 inch) per year, with the London area sinking at double the speed partly due to the continuing compression of the recent clay deposits. A contributory factor is the draining of many stretches of land.

In addition, rises in sea level thought to be due to global warming appear likely to make low-lying areas of land increasingly susceptible to flooding, while in some areas the coastline continues to erode at a geologically rapid rate.

Recent flooding events leave geological evidence such as the Bristol Channel floods in 1607.

The British Isles continue to be subject to several very minor earthquakes each month, and occasional light to moderate ones. During the 20th century 25 earthquakes with a magnitude of 4.5 to 6.1 on the Richter scale were felt, many of them originating within England itself. Notable was the Colchester earthquake in 1884 and the 2002 Dudley earthquake.

== Tectonics of Avalonia ==
The remaining rocks of Avalonia within Europe. It indicates the part which collided with Baltica in the upper Ordovician and that which collided with Laurentia in the Silurian.

Avalonia was an ancient microcontinent or terrane whose history formed much of the older rocks of Western Europe. The name is derived from the Avalon Peninsula in Newfoundland. England was almost entirely contained within the Avalonian block, as shown in the map, and thus shares its geolocation chronology.

In the early Cambrian, the supercontinent Pannotia broke up and Avalonia drifted off northwards from Gondwana. This independent movement of Avalonia started from a latitude of about 60° South. The eastern end of Avalonia collided with Baltica, a continental plate occupying the latitudes from about 30°S to 55°S, as the latter slowly rotated anticlockwise towards it. This happened at the end of the Ordovician and during the Early Silurian.

In the late Silurian and lower Devonian, the combined Baltica and Avalonia collided progressively, with Laurentia, beginning with the long extremity of Avalonia which is now attached to America. The result of this was the formation of Euramerica. At the completion of this stage, the site of Britain was at 30°S and Nova Scotia at about 45°S. This collision is represented by the Caledonian folding or in North America as an early phase in the Acadian orogeny.

In the Permian, the new continent and another terrane, Armorica which included Iberia, drifted in from Gondwana, trapping Avalonia between it and the continent so adding Iberia/Armorica to Euramerica. This was followed up by the arrival of Gondwana. The effects of these collisions are seen in Europe as the Variscan folding. In North America it shows as later phases of the Acadian orogeny. This was happening at around the Equator during the later Carboniferous, forming Pangaea in such a way that Avalonia was near its centre but partially flooded by shallow sea.

In the Jurassic, Pangaea split into Laurasia and Gondwana, with Avalonia as part of Laurasia. In the Cretaceous, Laurasia broke up into North America and Eurasia with Avalonia split between them.

== Institutions ==
- Geological Society of London
- British Geological Survey

== See also ==
- Geology of southern North Sea
- Geology of Great Britain
  - Geology of Scotland
  - Geology of Wales
- Geology of Ireland
- List of geology of English counties
- Geological groups of Great Britain
- Stone
- Geologic timescale
- Coal Seams of the South Yorkshire Coalfield
- Chalk Formation
- Gault Clay
- Geology of Alderley Edge
- Lizard complex
- Woolwich-and-Reading Beds
