= Regional geology =

Study of geologic regions

Regional geology is the geological study of large-scale regions. Usually, it encompasses multiple geological disciplines to piece together the history of an area. It is the geologic equivalent of regional geography. The size and the borders of each region are defined by geologically significant boundaries and by the occurrence of geologic processes. Examples of geologically significant boundaries are the interfingering facies change in sedimentary deposits when discussing a sedimentary basin system, or the leading or boundary thrust of an orogen.

== Africa ==
- Geology of Africa
  - Geology of Chad
  - Geology of Egypt
  - Geology of Madagascar
  - Geology of Rwanda
  - Geology of Togo

== Antarctica ==
- Geology of Antarctica

== Asia ==
- Geology of Asia
  - Geology of Armenia
  - Geology of Azerbaijan
  - Geology of Bangladesh
  - Geology of China
    - Geology of Fujian
  - Geology of Georgia (country)
  - Geology of Hong Kong
  - Geology of India
    - Geology of Sikkim
  - Geology of Indonesia
  - Geology of Japan
  - Geology of New Zealand
  - Geology of Pakistan
  - Geology of the Philippines
  - Geology of Russia
  - Geology of Singapore
  - Geology of Taiwan
  - Geology of Turkey
  - Geology of Vietnam

== Australia ==
- Geology of Australia
  - Geology of the Australian Capital Territory
  - Geology of New South Wales
  - Geology of Queensland
  - Geology of Tasmania
  - Geology of Victoria
  - Geology of the Yilgarn craton

== Europe ==
- Geology of Europe
  - Geology of Andorra
  - Geology of Armenia
  - Geology of Azerbaijan
  - Geology of Cyprus
  - Geology of Denmark
    - Geology of Faroe Islands
    - Geology of Greenland
  - Geology of Finland
  - Geology of France
    - Alps
    - Aquitaine Basin
    - Armorican Massif
    - Massif Central
    - Paris Basin
    - Pyrenees
    - Upper Rhine Plain
    - Rhone Furrow
    - Vosges Mountains
  - Geology of Germany
  - Geology of Great Britain
    - Geology of England
      - Geology of the English counties
      - Geology of Cambridgeshire
      - Geology of Cheshire
      - Geology of Cornwall
        - Lizard Complex
      - Geology of Dorset
      - Geology of East Sussex
      - Geology of Essex
      - Geology of Gloucestershire
      - Geology of Hampshire
      - Geology of Hertfordshire
      - Geology of Lincolnshire
      - Geology of Norfolk
      - Geology of Rutland
      - Geology of Shropshire
      - Geology of Somerset
      - Geology of Suffolk
      - Geology of Yorkshire
    - Geology of Scotland
      - Geology of Orkney
      - Geology of Skye
    - Geology of Wales
  - Geology of Guernsey
    - Geology of Alderney
  - Geology of the Iberian Peninsula
  - Geology of Iceland
  - Geology of Ireland
  - Geology of Italy
  - Geology of Jersey
  - Geology of the Netherlands
  - Geology of Norway
    - Geology of Svalbard
  - Geology of Russia
  - Geology of Serbia
  - Geology of Slovenia
  - Geology of Sweden
    - Geology of Gotland
  - Geology of Turkey

== North America ==
- Geology of North America
  - Geology of the Appalachians
  - Geology of New England
  - Geology of the Pacific Northwest
- Geology of the Rocky Mountains
  - Geology of Canada
  - Geology of the United States
    - Geology of Alabama
    - Geology of Alaska
    - Geology of Arizona
      - Geology of the Grand Canyon area
    - Geology of Arkansas
    - Geology of California
      - Geology of the Death Valley area
      - Geology of the Lassen volcanic area
      - Geology of Mount Shasta
      - Geology of the Yosemite area
    - Geology of Colorado
    - Geology of Connecticut
    - Geology of Delaware
    - Geology of Florida
    - Geology of Georgia
    - Geology of Hawaii
    - Geology of Idaho
    - Geology of Illinois
    - Geology of Indiana
    - Geology of Iowa
    - Geology of Kansas
    - Geology of Kentucky
    - Geology of Louisiana
    - Geology of Maine
    - Geology of Maryland
    - Geology of Massachusetts
    - Geology of Michigan
    - Geology of Minnesota
    - Geology of Mississippi
    - Geology of Missouri
    - Geology of Montana
    - Geology of Nebraska
    - Geology of Nevada
    - Geology of New Hampshire
    - Geology of New Jersey
    - Geology of New Mexico
    - Geology of New York
      - Glacial geology of the Genesee River
    - Geology of North Carolina
    - Geology of North Dakota
    - Geology of Ohio
    - Geology of Oklahoma
    - Geology of Oregon
    - Geology of Pennsylvania
    - Geology of Rhode Island
    - Geology of South Carolina
    - Geology of South Dakota
    - Geology of Tennessee
    - Geology of Texas
    - Geology of Utah
      - Geology of the Bryce Canyon area
      - Geology of the Canyonlands area
      - Geology of the Capitol Reef area
      - Geology of the Zion and Kolob canyons area
    - Geology of Vermont
    - Geology of Virginia
    - Geology of Washington
    - Geology of Washington, D.C.
      - Geology of Mount Adams
    - Geology of West Virginia
    - Geology of Wisconsin
    - Geology of Wyoming
      - Geology of the Grand Teton area

== South America ==
- Geology of South America
  - Geology of Bolivia
  - Geology of Chile
  - Geology of Colombia
  - Geology of the Falkland Islands
  - Geology of Uruguay

== By mountain range ==
- Geology of the Alps
- Geology of the Andes
- Geology of the Appalachians
- Geology of the Himalaya
- Geology of the Rocky Mountains
