= Trailside Museum of Natural History =

- Army Theatre
- U.S. National Register of Historic Places
- U.S. National Historic Landmark District – Contributing property
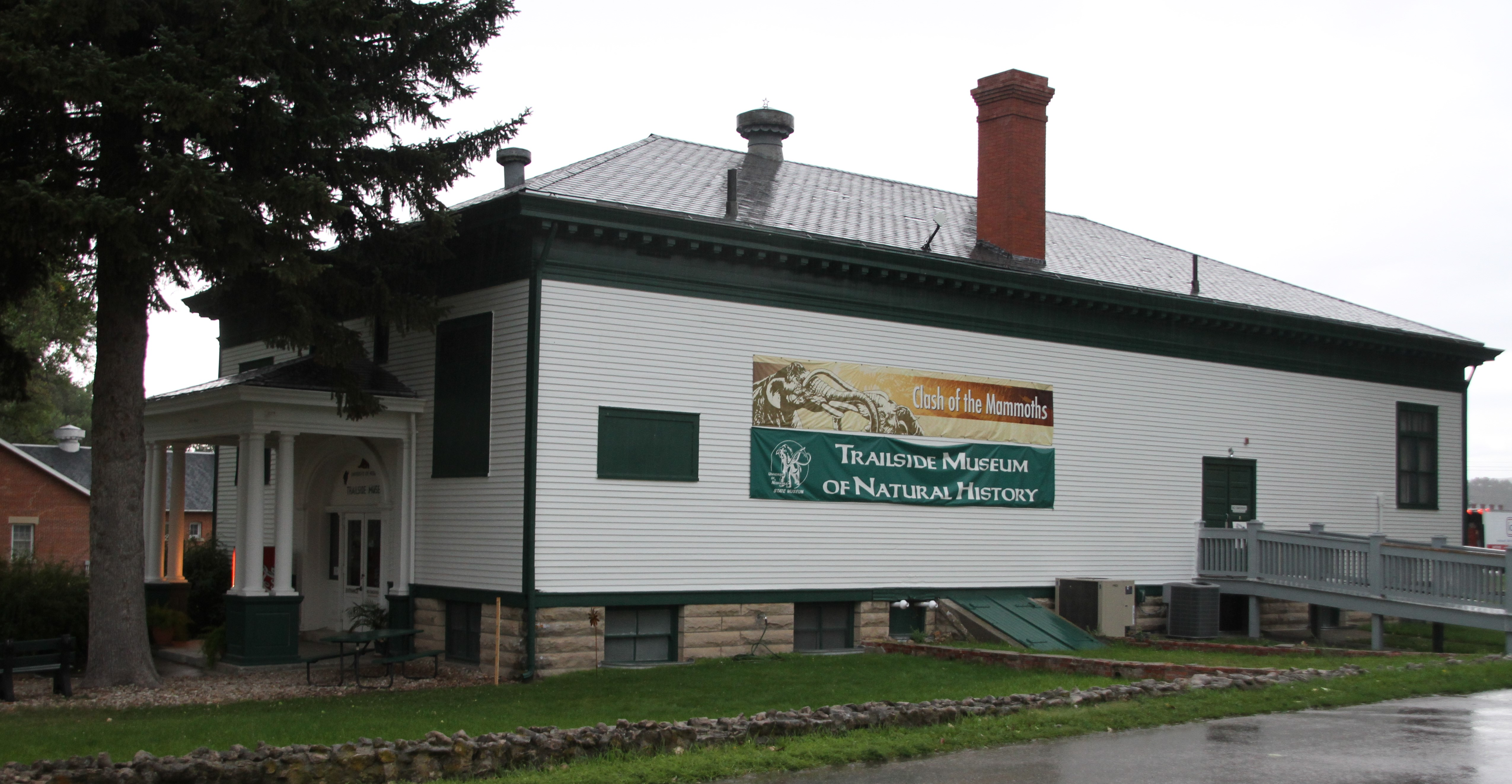
- Trailside Museum of Natural History

- Location within Nebraska Location within the United States
- Location: Crawford, Nebraska
- Coordinates: 42°39′59.5″N 103°27′59.5″W
- Built: 1904
- Architect: Army Corps of Engineers
- Part of: Fort Robinson and Red Cloud Agency (ID66000442)
- MPS: Opera House Buildings in Nebraska 1867-1917 MPS
- NRHP reference No.: 88000930

Significant dates
- Added to NRHP: July 7, 1988
- Designated NHLDCP: October 15, 1966

The Trailside Museum of Natural History is located in the historic Army Theatre at Fort Robinson State Park, three miles west of Crawford, Nebraska on U.S. Route 20.

== History ==
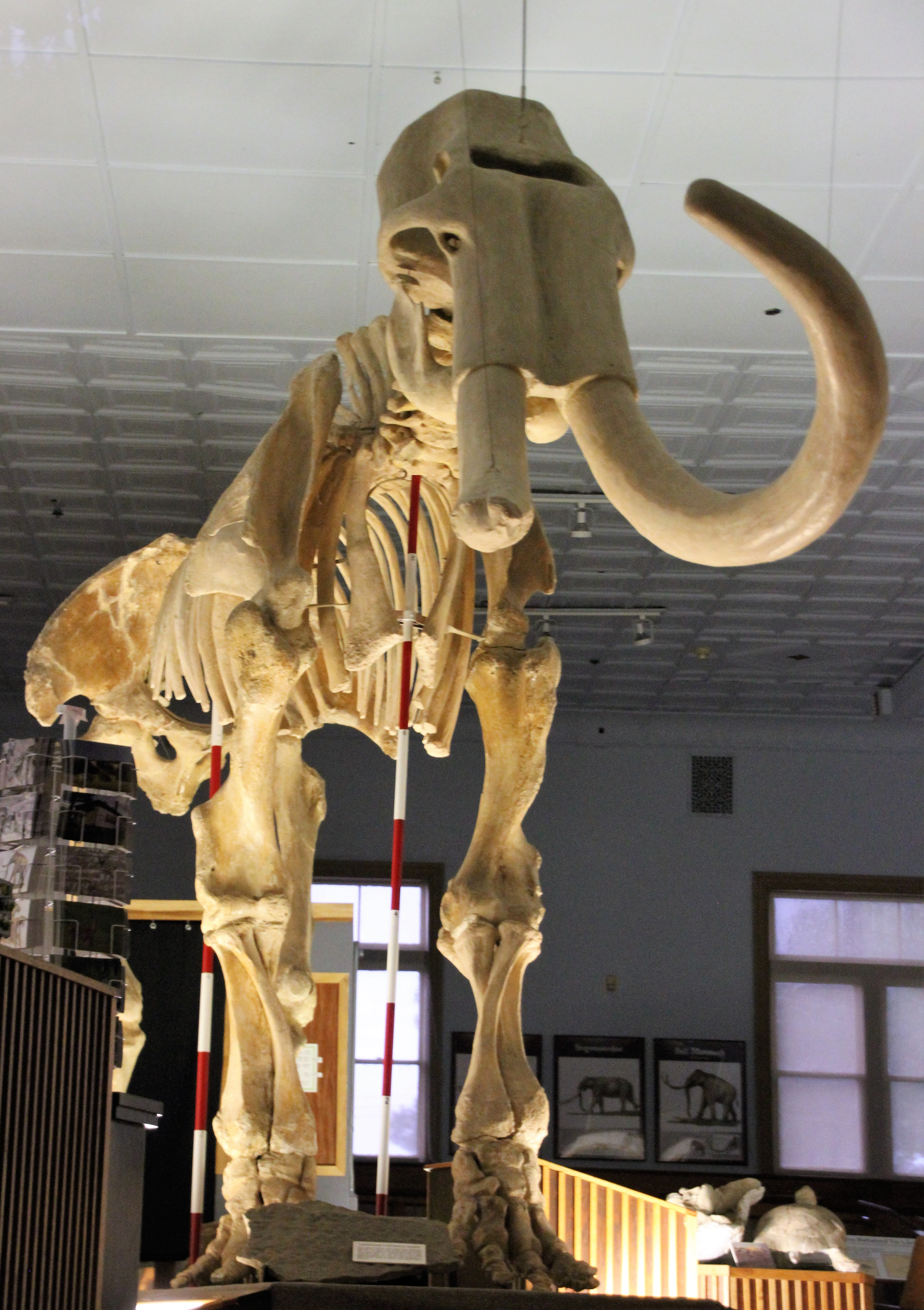
Inside the museum in 2017

The building served as a theater and gymnasium for the Fort Robinson army post. The theater hosted many types of entertainment, including boxing matches, dances, and moving pictures. By 1917, the theater was being used exclusively as a gym, as automobiles and movie houses became more prevalent and allowed soldiers to seek entertainment elsewhere.

The building was acquired by the University of Nebraska State Museum in 1955 which opened the Trailside Museum at Fort Robinson in 1961. It was listed on the National Register of Historic Places in 1988, and is also part of the Fort Robinson and Red Cloud Agency historic district.

== Exhibitions ==
The museum exhibits the fossils of two ice age Columbian mammoth bulls which died with their tusks locked together, evidently the result of intraspecific combat. The fossils were discovered in 1962 on nearby private land, and the excavation was led by paleontologist Michael Voorhies. The exhibit, called Clash of the Mammoths, opened to the public in 2006.

Other exhibits in the museum cover topics such as ice age mammals of the Great Plains, paleontology of the Agate Fossil Beds, Cretaceous marine fossils from Western Interior Seaway deposits, and the geology of western Nebraska, amongst others.

== See also ==
- Paleontology of Nebraska
