= Geology of North America =

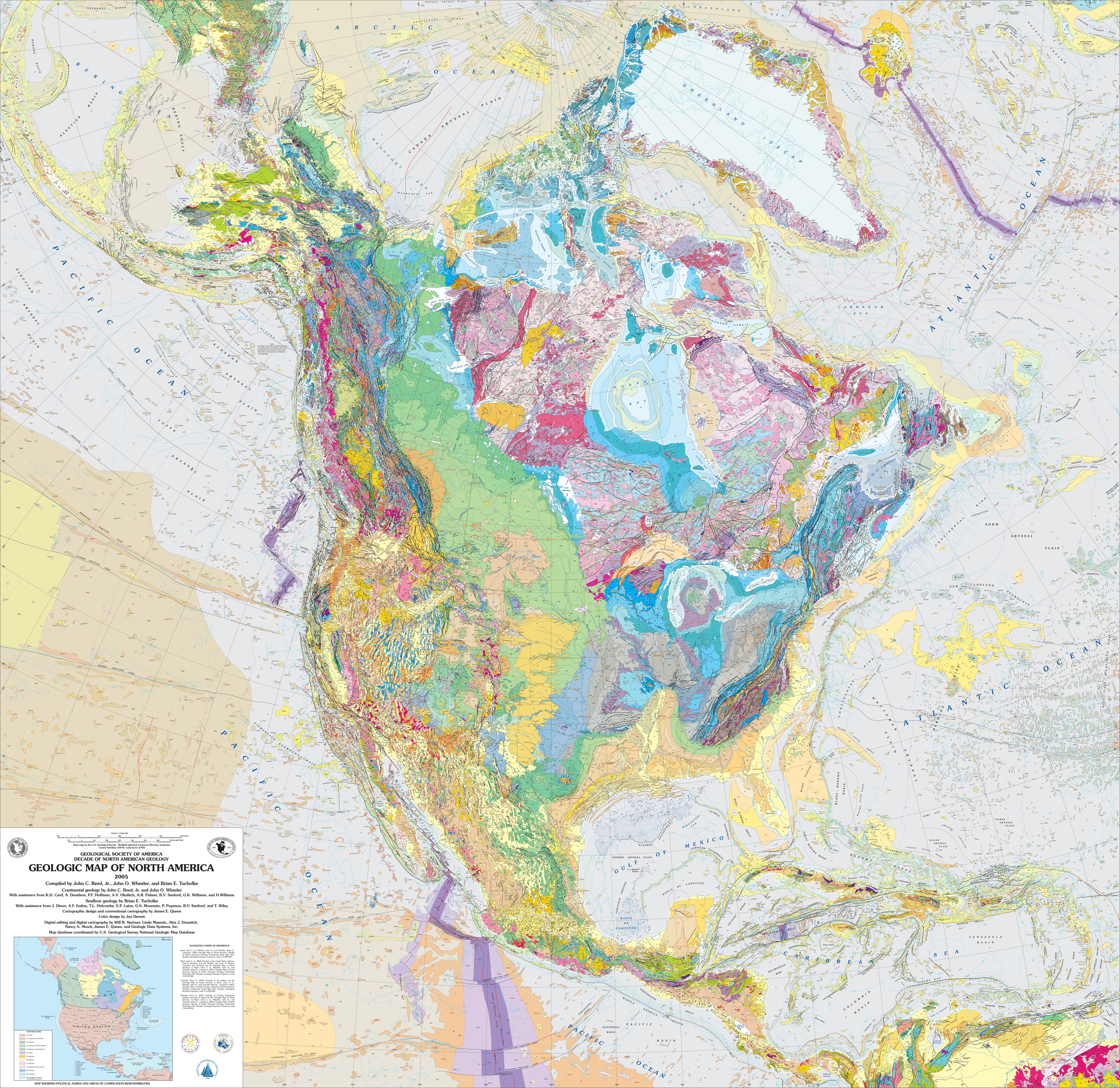
USGS Geologic Map of North America (High resolution, click to zoom)

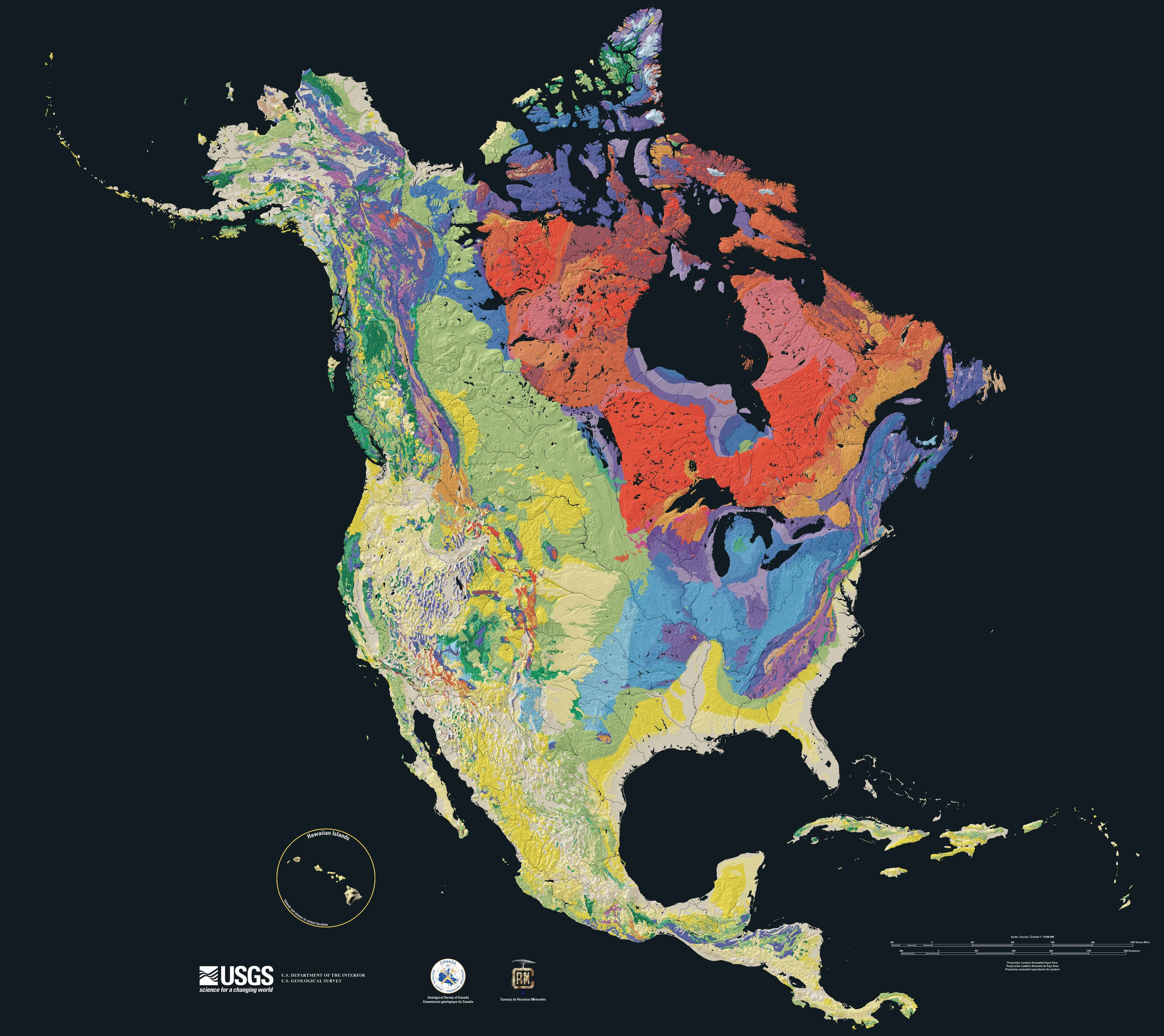
Relief map showing the varying age of bedrock underlying North America. (Click to zoom) See legend below

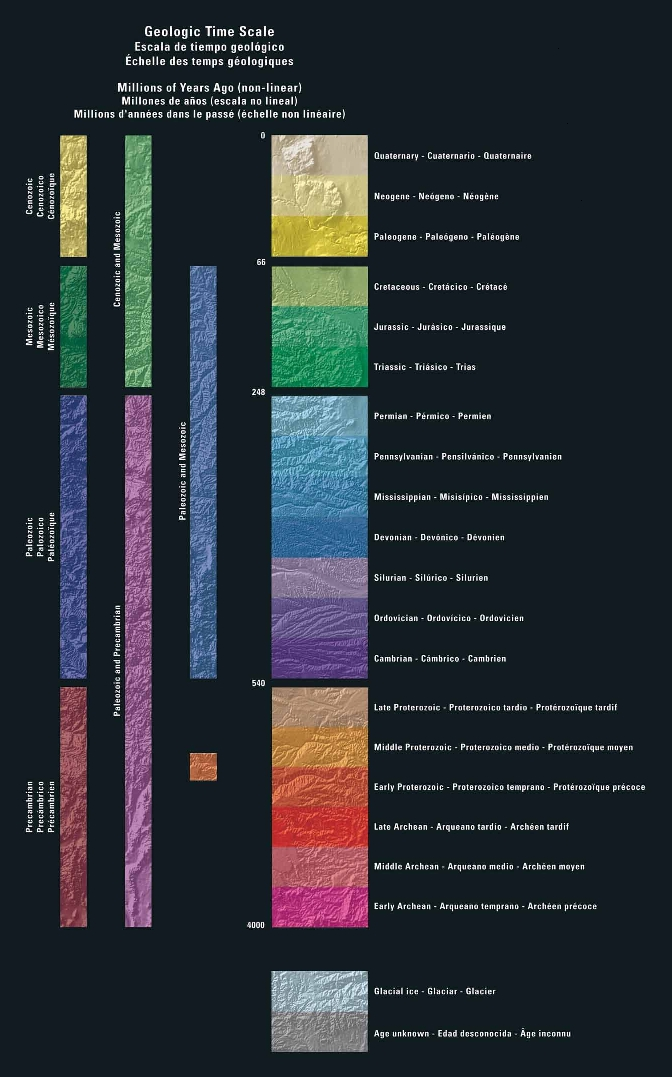
This is the legend for the North American geological map above.

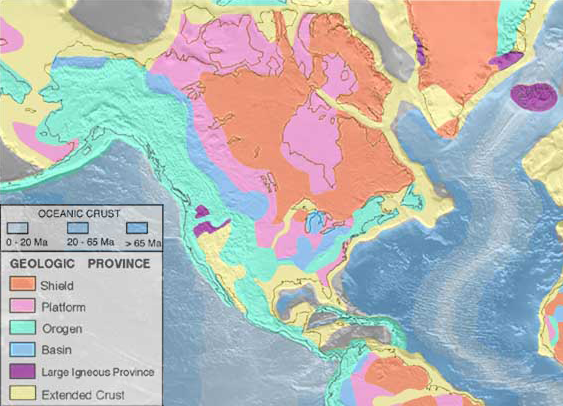
Geologic map of North America

The geology of North America is a subject of regional geology and covers the North American continent, the third-largest in the world. Geologic units and processes are investigated on a large scale to reach a synthesized picture of the geological development of the continent.

The divisions of regional geology are drawn in different ways, but are usually outlined by a common geologic history, geographic vicinity or political boundaries. The regional geology of North America usually encompasses the geographic regions of Alaska, Canada, Greenland, the continental United States, Mexico, Central America, and the Caribbean. The parts of the North American Plate that are not occupied by North American countries are usually not discussed as part of the regional geology. The regions that are not geographically North American but reside on the North American Plate include parts of Siberia (see the Geology of Russia), and Iceland, and Bermuda. A discussion of North American geology can also include other continental plates including the Cocos Plats and Juan de Fuca Plate being subducted beneath western North America. A portion of the Pacific Plate underlies Baja California and part of California west of the San Andreas Fault.

== North American Craton ==
The stable core of the continent is the North American Craton. Much of it was also the core of an earlier continent, Laurentia. The part of the craton where the basement rock is exposed is called the Canadian Shield. Surrounding this is a stable platform where the basement is covered by sediment; and surrounding that are a series of orogenic zones.

=== Canadian Shield ===
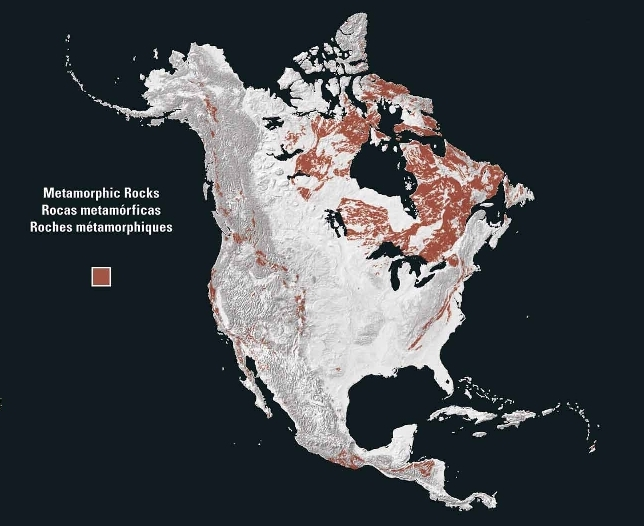
On a map showing only metamorphic rocks, the Canadian Shield forms a circular pattern north of the Great Lakes around Hudson Bay.

The Canadian Shield is a large area of Archean through Proterozoic igneous and metamorphic rocks in eastern Canada and north central and northeastern United States.

The earliest part of the shield is metamorphosed Archean rocks, originally volcanic in origin. Numerous terranes were accreted onto this Archean core during the Proterozoic to form the Canadian Shield. The southern Archean province is the Superior Craton, it is formed by the combination of a greenstone-granite and a gneiss terrane. The margins of the Canadian Shield have been covered by sedimentary rocks, such as in Michigan where a series of sediments has filled in the Michigan Basin. The exposed sections are often where glaciers have removed this overlying regolith to reveal the underlying glacially scarred crystalline rock.

=== Stable platform ===
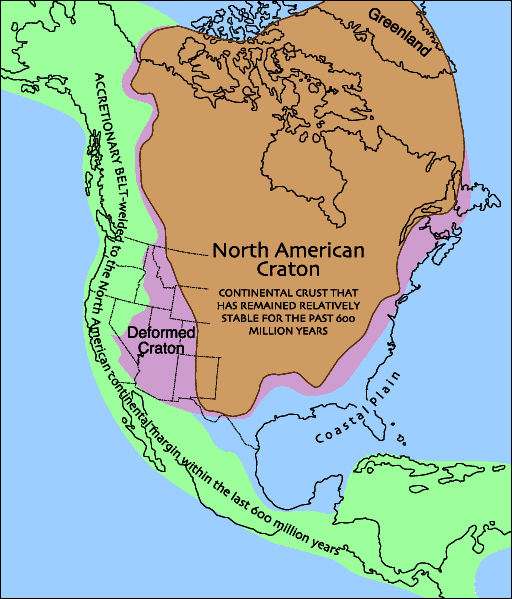
The North American craton

The stable platform is an area in which the North American Craton forms a basement and is covered by sediment. This area now forms much of the Interior Plains and the slope of the Appalachians below the mountains proper. This area has been covered by a shallow inland sea, which became the site of deposition for most of the overlying sedimentary rock. The sea receded as the continent rose becoming covered by stream, lake, and wind deposits. Orogenies in the surrounding provinces have had little effect on the craton, making it an epeirogenic region, and, as such, the stable platform is mostly a crystalline basement, covered by sedimentary rocks, interrupted only by occasional domes, such as the Cincinnati Arch, Wisconsin Dome, and Ozark Dome.

=== Midcontinent rift system ===
One billion years ago, the Midcontinent Rift System began to extend along a 2,000 kilometres (1,200 mi) path, across both the Canadian Shield and the Stable Platform. The rift failed, then crustal movement reversed. A range formed then eroded, forming basins on either side of a horst. These rocks have been buried beneath sediment in many areas, but are exposed in some areas, especially around Lake Superior.

=== Grenville Orogen ===
The Grenville Orogen developed during the Proterozoic along eastern and southern margin of the North American Craton. The largest outcrop of Grenville age rocks is an approximately 400 kilometres (250 mi) wide band southeast of the Grenville Front which stretches from the central Labrador coast southwest across southern Quebec and southeastern Ontario to Georgian Bay on Lake Huron. The southeastern boundary of this area is approximately the St. Lawrence River. Rocks of the Grenville outcrop in the Adirondack Mountains of northern New York and throughout the Appalachians. The Llano Uplift of central Texas and the Franklin and Hueco Mountains of west Texas have been correlated with the Grenville as have occurrences in Mexico.

=== Appalachian Orogen ===
Map of Appalachian geological provinces

The fold and thrust belt of the Appalachians is continuously exposed for 2,000 kilometres (1,200 mi) from Pennsylvania to Alabama. In the south, it extends under the coastal plain, but is covered by Mesozoic sediments. North of this fold and thrust belt, the Acadian Orogen of the middle Devonian is an area where deformation has exposed granite plutons. The center of the range is a pair of provinces running north and south parallel to each other, the eastern Blue Ridge Province and the western Valley and Ridge provinces. These are surrounded by the Appalachian Plateau on the west, and the Piedmont Province to the east. Faulting extends throughout the region and is caused by numerous spatially and temporally varied sources.

Inliers of Late Mesoproterozoic age are present on the west of the core of the Appalachians, and these inliers are associated with the Grenville orogeny. During the Proterozoic terranes were accreted onto the province. During the Taconic orogeny 445 to 435 million years ago, accretion continued, an island arc collided with the North American continent, and mountains were raised. These mountains slowly eroded and deposited sediment into the Catskill delta, stretching from New York to Pennsylvania.

==== Piedmont ====
The eastern portion of the orogen is made up of the Piedmont plateau, a 150 to 300 metres (490 to 980 ft) elevation area composed of Paleozoic marine and volcanic sediments deformed into crystalline metamorphic rocks and intruded by granite domes.

During the Proterozoic a series of terranes were accreted onto the North American craton, forming the Piedmont of the central Appalachians. Following the Grenville orogeny, mountains eroded, and the sediments from this erosion were deposited below the mountains. The bedrock of the plateau formed about 470 million years ago during the Taconic orogeny, when a volcanic island arc collided with the ancestral North American Continent.

== Passive Margin ==
As the Atlantic Ocean opened the Atlantic Coast turned from an active margin into a passive one. Terranes were no longer accreted onto the margin; instead, sediment eroded off the Appalachians began to be deposited on the coast, forming a coastal plain and continental shelf. During the Jurassic and Triassic, marine and other sediment was deposited to form the Atlantic coastline. The sediment has formed a clastic wedge making up most of the coastal plain and continental shelf.

The passive margin of the Gulf of Mexico is a series of sedimentary deposits from upland areas surrounding the margin. The environment of deposition for these sediments has changed, varying spatially and temporally. When the ocean level was high shallow marine deposits occurred; when they were low fluvial and deltaic deposits form the majority of mass. From the Triassic until the early Jurassic, faulting localized as extension faulting and wrench faulting. As the basement subsided, sediment accumulated, during the Mesozoic and Cenozoic, forming the modern wedge, containing salt basins.

The passive margin in eastern Mexico is made up of a series of basins. These basins are mostly igneous or metamorphic rocks covered by sediments, except in the Burgos Basin, where Cenozoic volcanism has occurred. Much of the sediment is from erosion of the thrust belts west of the margin.

The Yucatan Platform is a Cretaceous to Oligocene carbonate platform. Uplift started in the Oligocene and lasted till the Pleistocene. Today the platform is exposed and under the influence of karstification.

== North American Cordillera ==
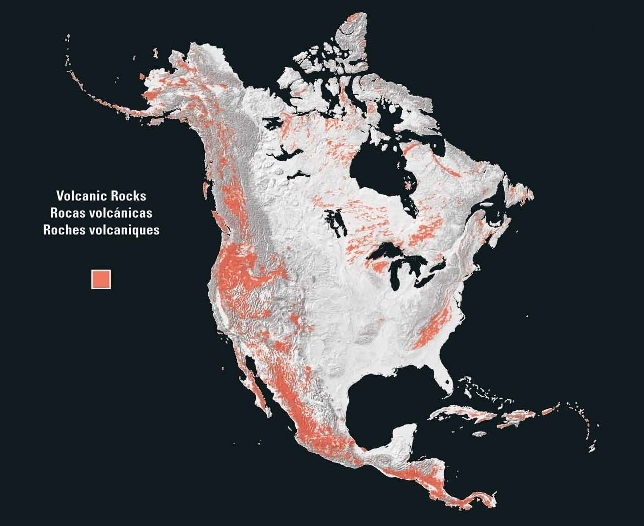
On a map showing only volcanic rocks, the west coast of North America shows a striking continuous north–south structure, the American Cordillera.

The North American Cordillera extends up and down the coast of North America and roughly from the Great Plains westward to the Pacific Ocean, narrowing somewhat from north to south. It includes the Cascades, Sierra Nevada, and Basin and Range province; the Rocky Mountains are sometimes excluded from the cordillera proper, in spite of their tectonic history. The geology of Alaska is typical of that of the cordillera.

A rupture in Rodinia 750 million years ago formed a passive margin in the eastern Pacific Northwest. The breakup of Pangea 200 million years ago began the westward movement of the North American plate, creating an active margin on the western continent. As the continent drifted West, accretion of various terranes onto the west coast occurred. As these accretions occurred, crustal shortening accompanied them during the Sevier orogeny and during the Mesozoic into the early Cenozoic, and was accompanied by faulting. During the Cenozoic, crustal extension began accompanied by magmatism that came to characterize much of the area.

=== Rocky Mountains ===
The Rocky Mountains were formed by a series of events, the last of which is the Laramide Orogeny. One of the outstanding features of the Rocky Mountains is the distance of the range from a subducting plate; this has led to the theory that the Laramide Orogeny took place when the Farallon plate subducted at a low angle, causing uplift far from the margin under which the plate subducted.

The lithology of the Rocky Mountains in western Canada includes a thin-skinned fold and thrust belt involving Neoproterozoic through Mississippian series of carbonates, shales, argillites and sandstones.

The Colorado Plateau is a stable region dating back at least 600 million years. As a relative lowland, it had been a site of deposition for sediments eroded from surrounding mountain regions. Then, during the Laramide Orogeny, the entire plateau was uplifted until about six million years ago. Erosion during and following the uplift removed sediment from the plateau. This load removal resulted in isostatic uplift and a second passive rise for the plateau.

=== Intermontane Province ===
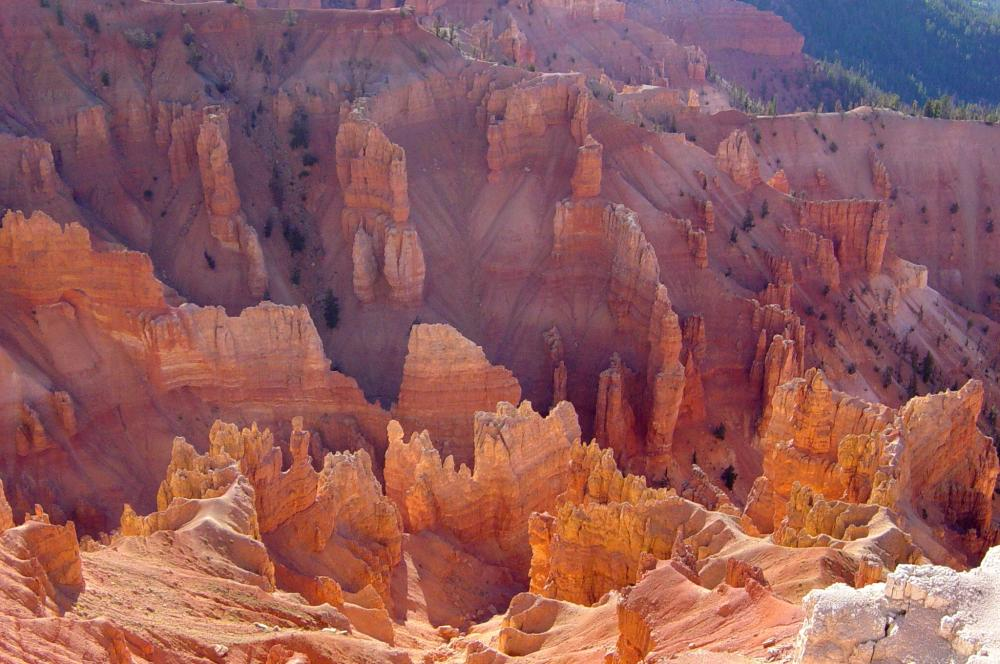
Cedar Breaks National Monument, Utah.

Between the Rocky Mountains and the coast ranges is an area dominated by extensional forces. The extension of this region has occurred both regionally and locally in events beginning in the Jurassic; however, most extension was localized until the mid Miocene. These local events occurred in the Jurassic, late Cretaceous, and one spanning from the Eocene until the Oligocene. Regional extension occurred during the middle of the Miocene from around 20 million years ago until 10 million years ago.

The Basin and Range Province is a series of linear block fault mountains with adjacent sediment-filled downfaulted valleys, having been caused by crustal extension around 17 million years ago. The valley floors are made up of thick sediment deposits which have eroded off the mountains and filled the valleys, so that the region is a regular series of ridges spaced out by flat sediment valleys.

=== Coast ===
On the West coast of North America, the coast ranges and the coastal plain form the margin, which is partially bounded by the San Andreas Fault, a transform boundary of the Pacific Plate. Most of the land is made of terranes that have been accreted onto the margin. In the north, the insular belt is an accreted terrane, forming the margin. This belt extends from the Wrangellia Terrane in Alaska to the Chilliwack group of Canada.

The timing of the accretion of the insular belt is uncertain, although the closure did not occur until at least 115 million years ago. Other Mesozoic terranes that accreted onto the continent include the Klamath Mountains, the Sierra Nevada, and the Guerrero super-terrane of western Mexico. 80 to 90 million years ago the subducting Farallon plate split and formed the Kula Plate to the North. Many of the major batholiths date from the late Cretaceous. As the Laramide Orogeny ended around 48 million years ago, the accretion of the Siletzia terrane began in the Pacific Northwest. This began the volcanic activity in the Cascadia subduction zone, forming the modern Cascade Range, and lasted into the Miocene. As extension in the Basin and Range Province slowed by a change in North American Plate movement circa 7 to 8 Million years ago, rifting began on the Gulf of California.

=== Southern Cordillera ===
The Sierra Madre mountain ranges of Mexico are separated by the Mexican Plateau, and transected by the Trans-Mexican Volcanic Belt. The Southern extent of the American Cordillera makes up Western Mexico and northern Central America. This includes the Sierra Madre Occidental, the Sierra Madre del Sur, and the Trans-Mexican Volcanic Belt.

The Cordillera ends in the south in a belt of miogeoclines, including the Sierra Madre Oriental fold and thrust belt, the Mesa Central, and parts of the Sierra Madre del Sur. This belt also extends into Guatemala and Honduras in Central America.

== See also ==
- Geology of North America
  - Geology of Canada
  - Geology of the Caribbean
    - Geology of Jamaica
    - Geology of Puerto Rico
  - Geology of Central America
    - Geology of Belize
  - Geology of Greenland
  - Geology of the Lucayan Archipelago
  - Geology of Mexico
  - Geology of the United States
- Geography of North America
- List of mountain peaks of North America
