= List of caves in Azerbaijan =

There are many natural caves in Azerbaijan. Most of these caves are karstic caves and the remainder are volcanic caves (lava tubes). These caves were also the first shelters and dwellings of Stone Age hominids and humans.

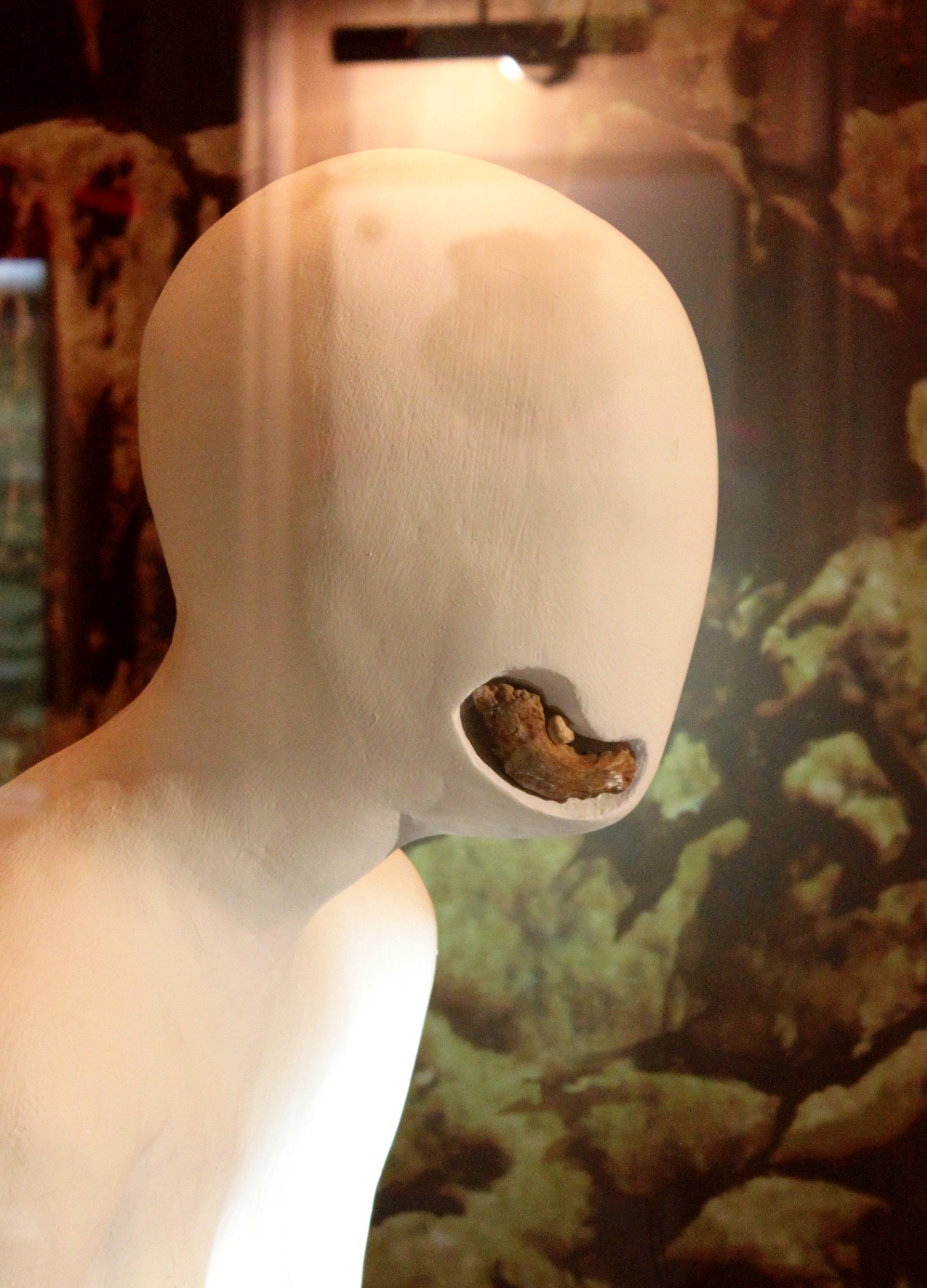
The lower jawbone of a hominid named Azykhantrop found in Azykh Cave is on display at the National Museum of History of Azerbaijan.

Azykh Cave, one of the most famous caves of Azerbaijan, is known as the settlement of Stone Age hominids. It was determined that the cave was the settlement of the Acheulean and the Mousterian cultures. During the period of the Mousterian culture, Neanderthals lived in Azykh Cave.

== List of caves in Azerbaijan ==
The list does not include all caves.

Name	Name in Azerbaijani	Location
Allar Cave	Allar mağarası	Yardymli District
Ashabi-Kahf Cave	Əshabi-Kəhf	Babek District
Buzeyir Cave	Büzeyir mağarası	Lerik District
Zar Cave	Zar mağarası	Kalbajar District
Kilit Cave	Kilit mağarası	Ordubad District
Tağlar Cave	Tağlar mağarası	Khojavend District
Shish Kuzey Cave	Şiş Quzey	Tovuz District
Shusha Cave	Şuşa mağarası	Shusha District

== List of cave complexes in Azerbaijan ==
The list does not include all cave complexes.

Name	Name in Azerbaijani	Location
Azykh Cave	Azıx mağarası	Khojavend District
Damjili Cave	Damcılı mağarası	Qazakh District
Dash Salahli Cave	Daş Salahlı mağarası	Qazakh District
Hadikaib Cave	Hadiqaib mağarası	Sharur District
Ugan Cave	Uğan mağarası	Oghuz District
Mereze Cave	Mərəzə mağarası	Gobustan District

== Gallery ==
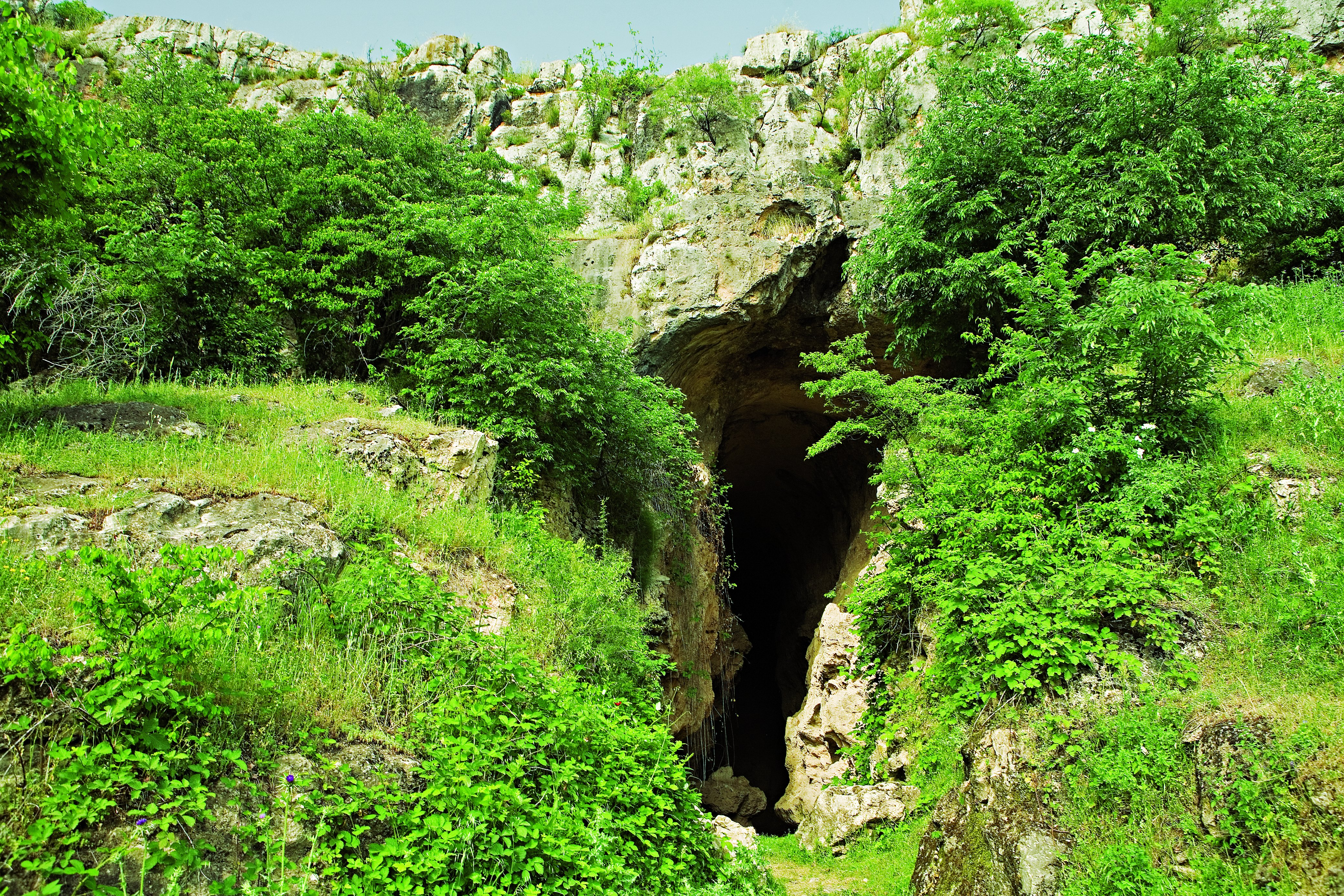
Entrance of Azykh Cave

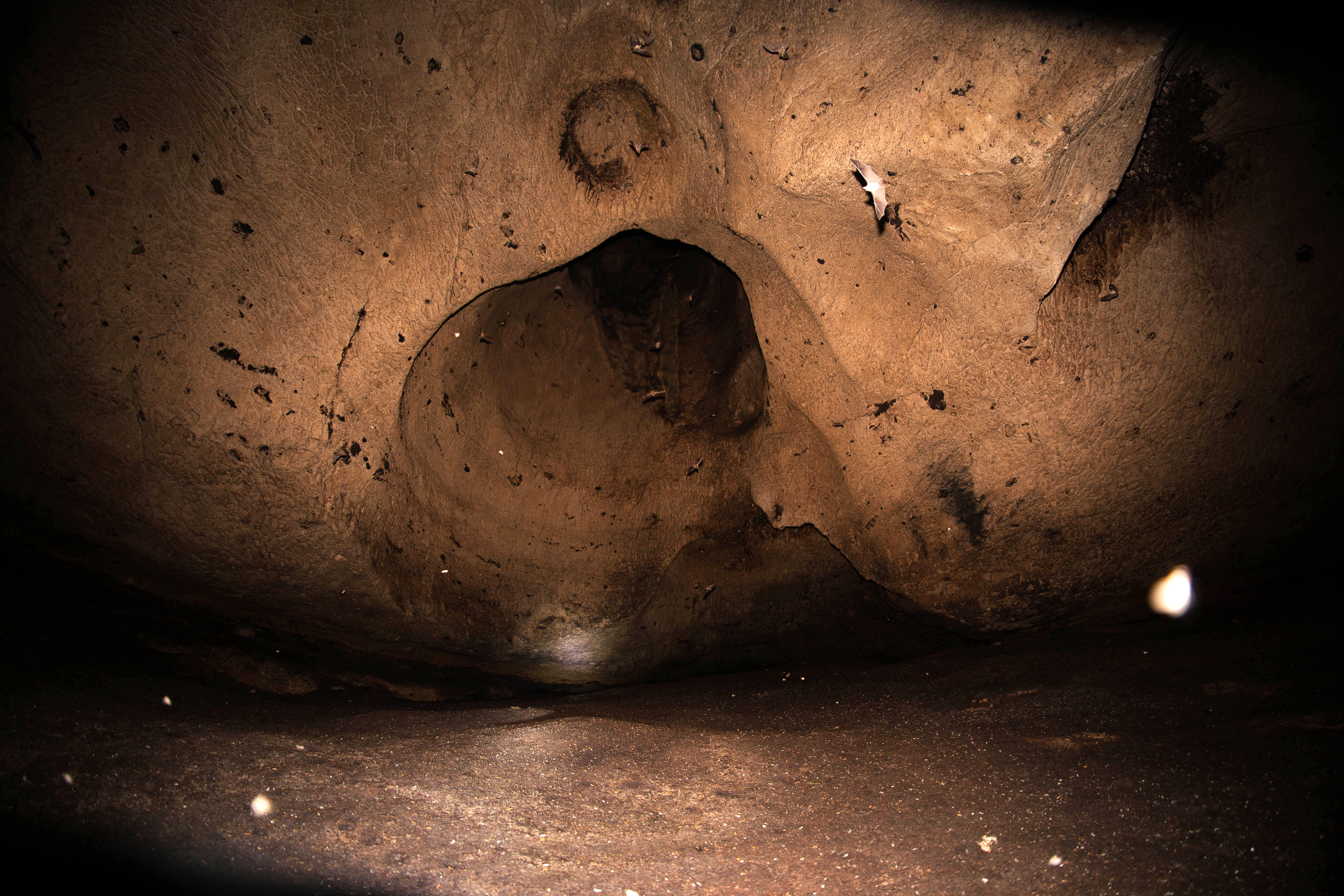
A bat in Azykh Cave

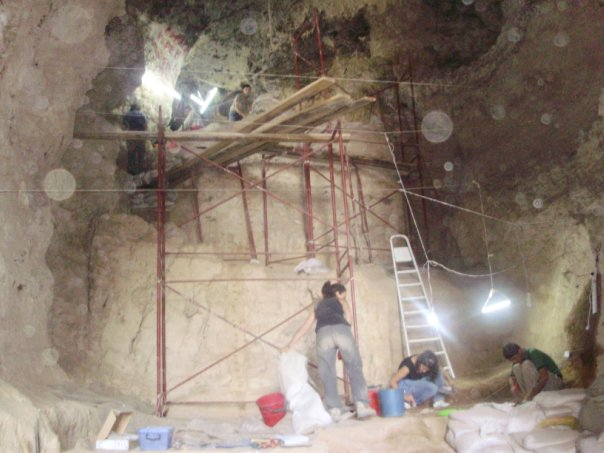
Archaeological excavations in Azykh Cave in 2009

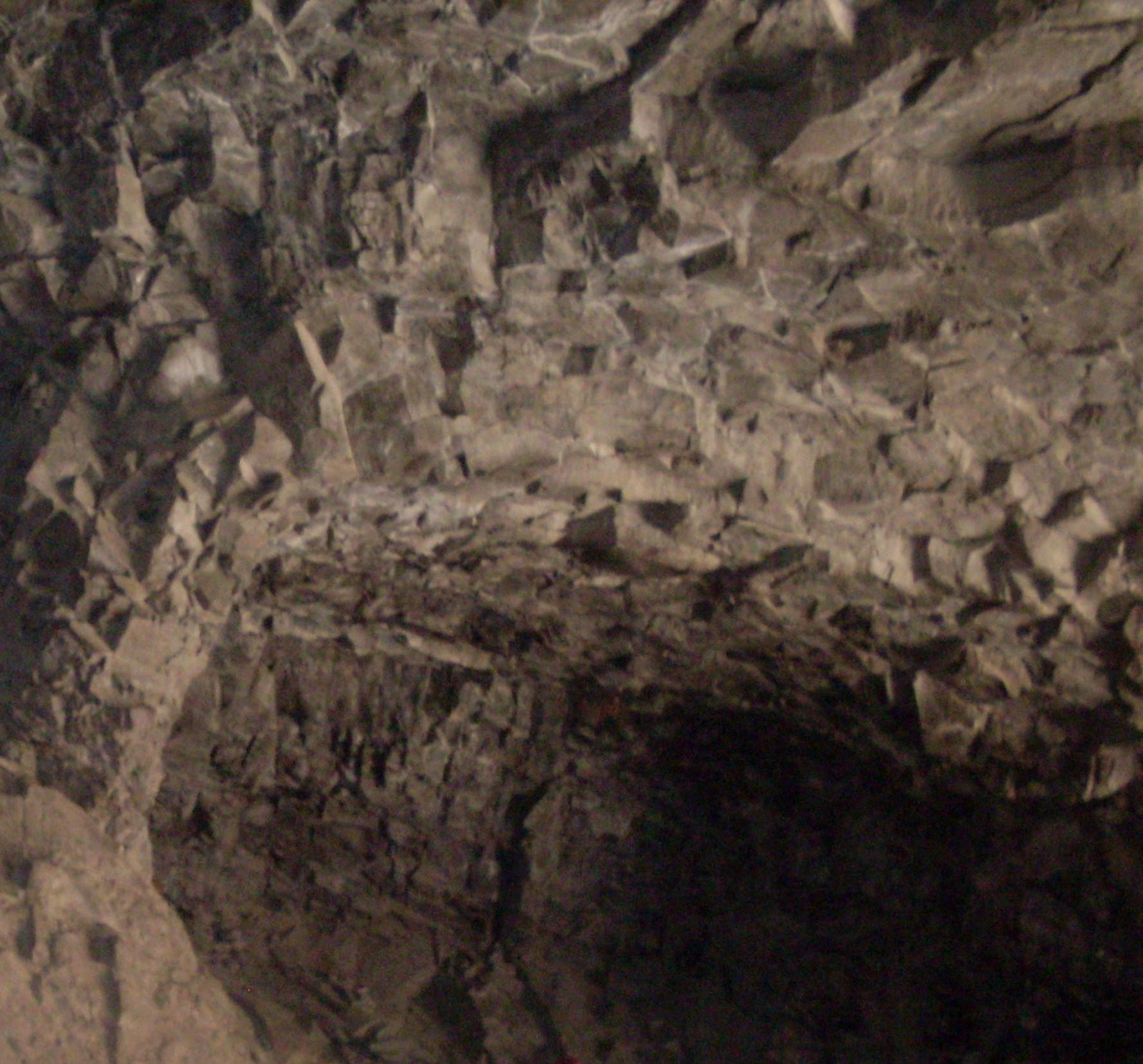
Ashabi-Kahf Cave

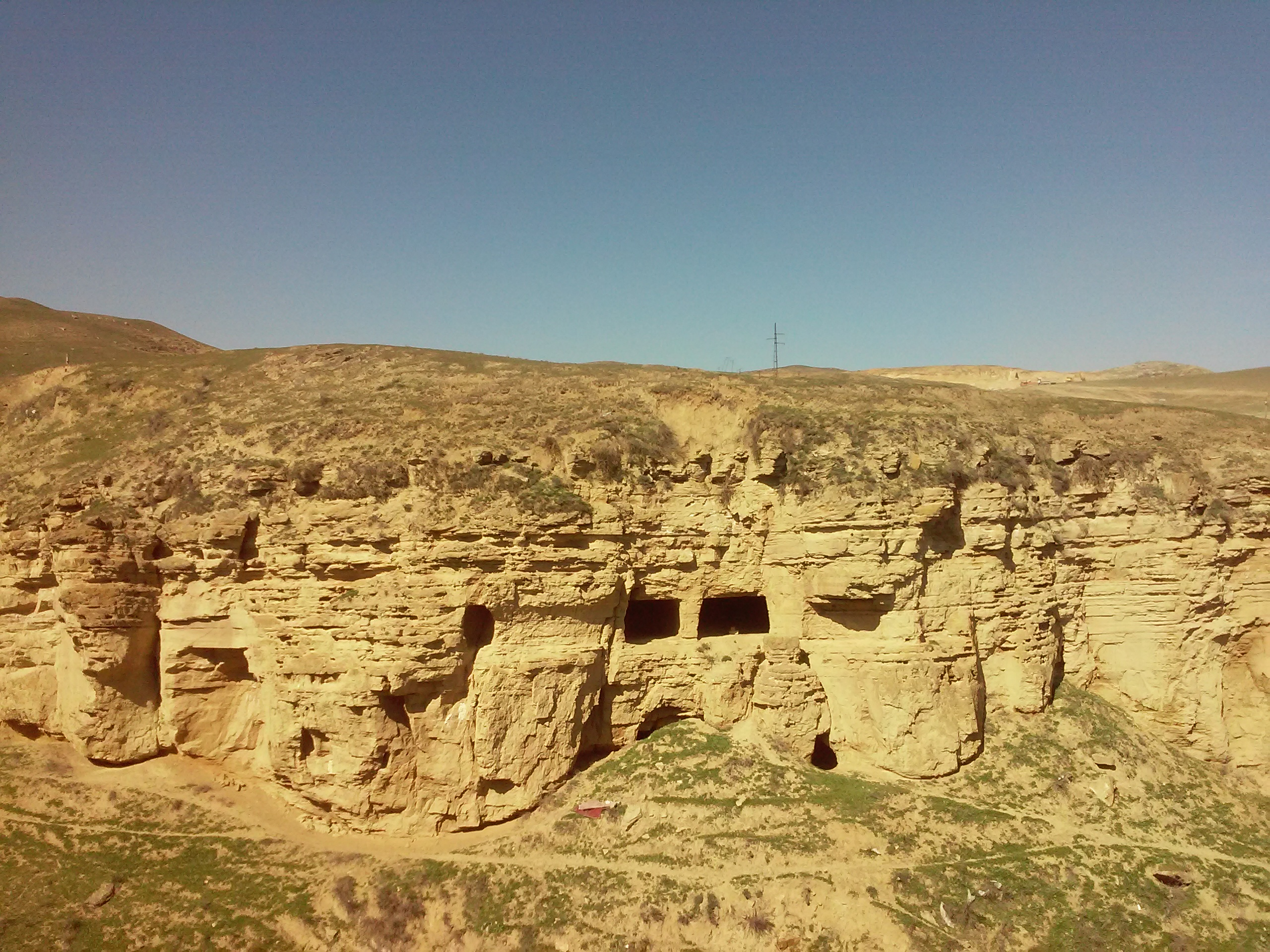
Mereze Cave

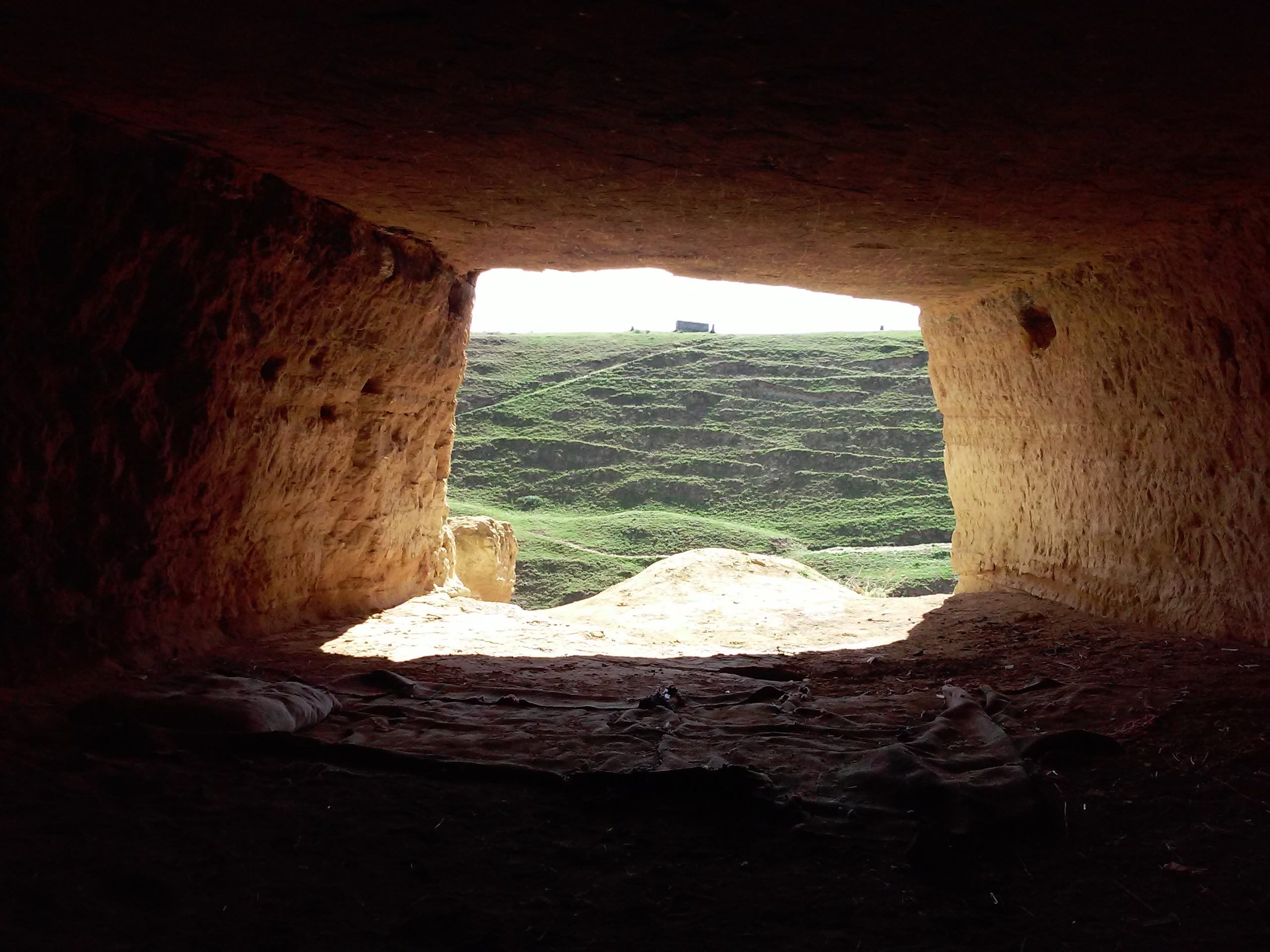
Interior of Mereze Cave

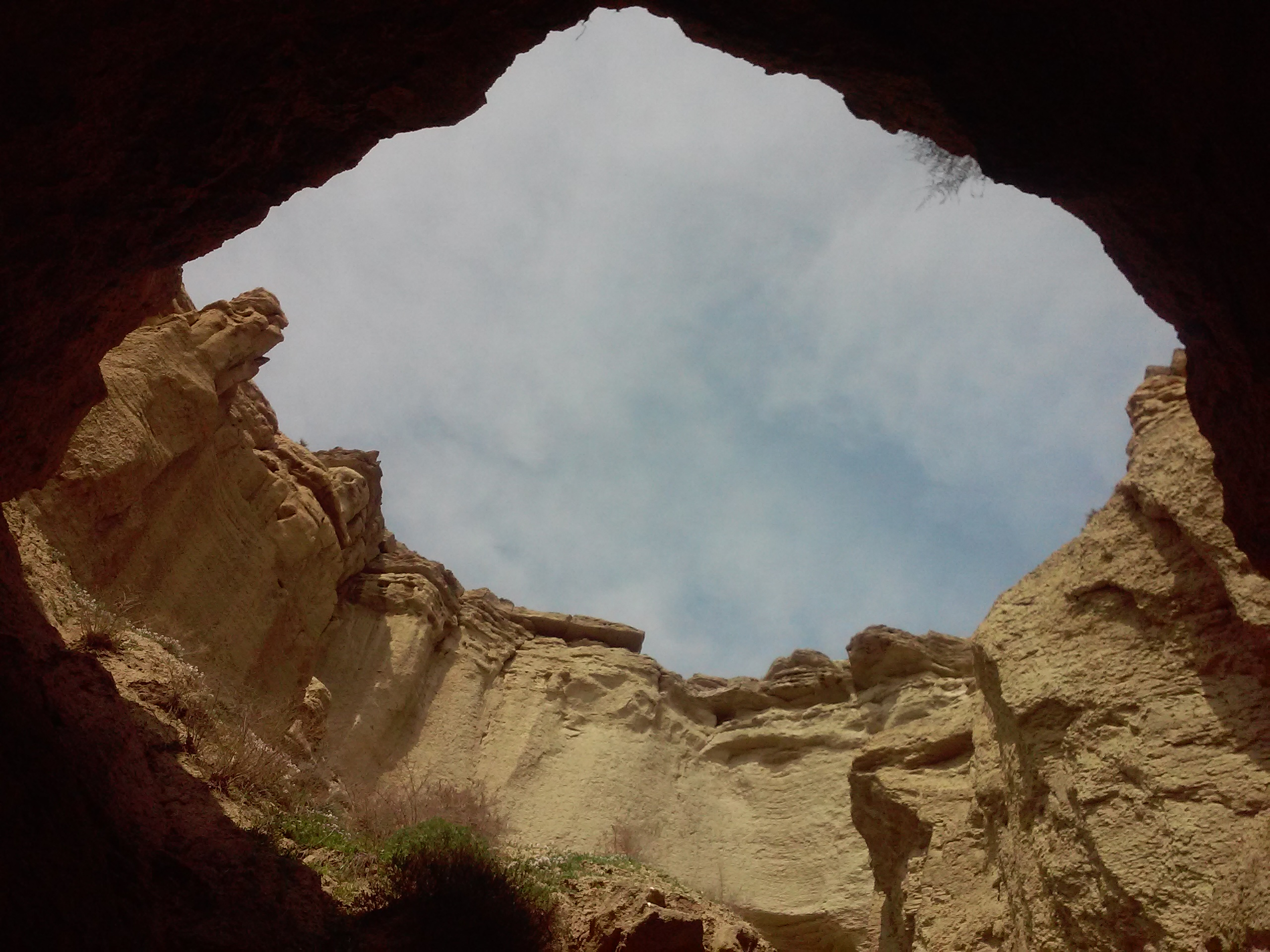
Karstic cave in Qaradag District

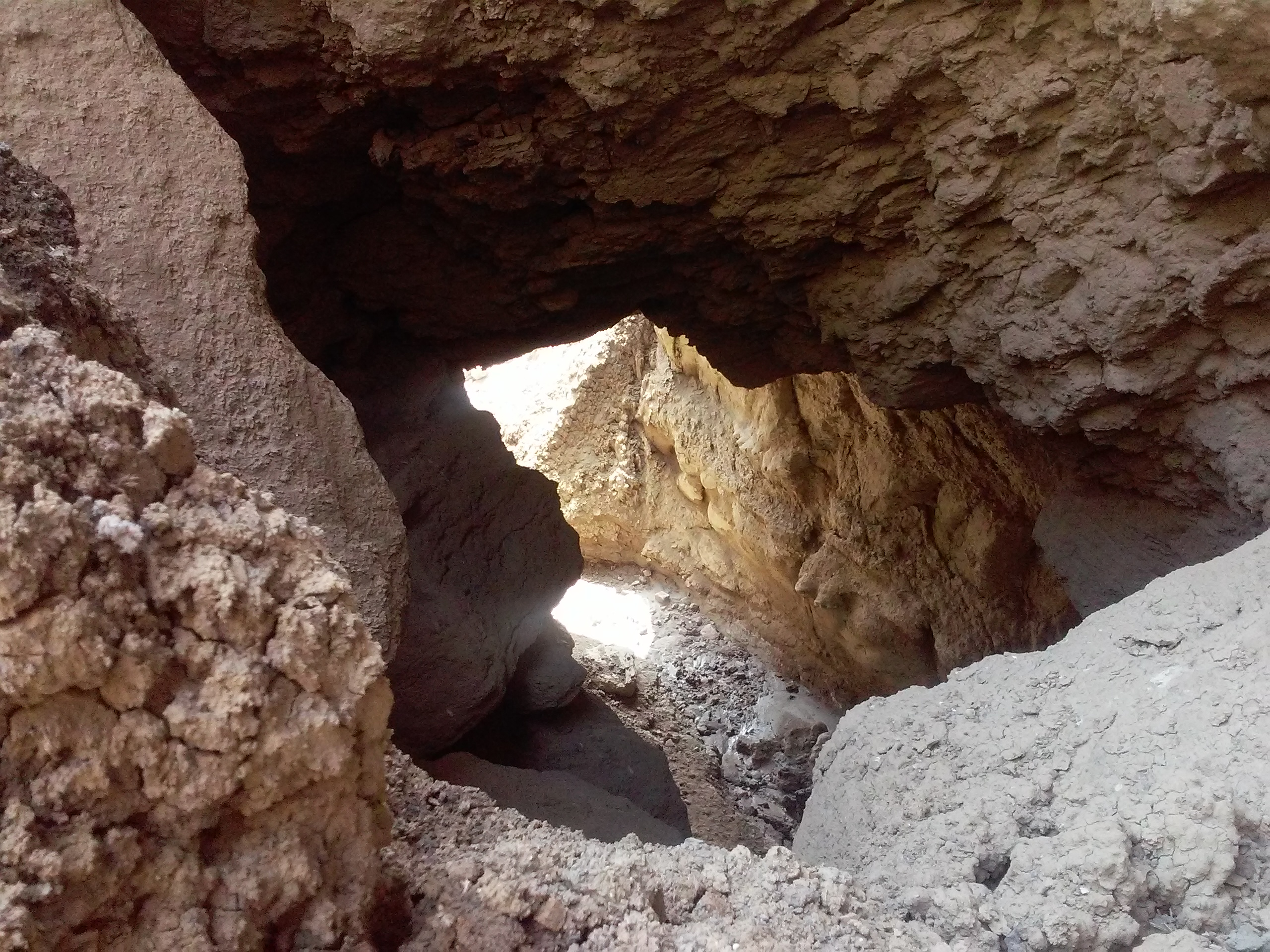
Karstic cave formation in Qaradag District

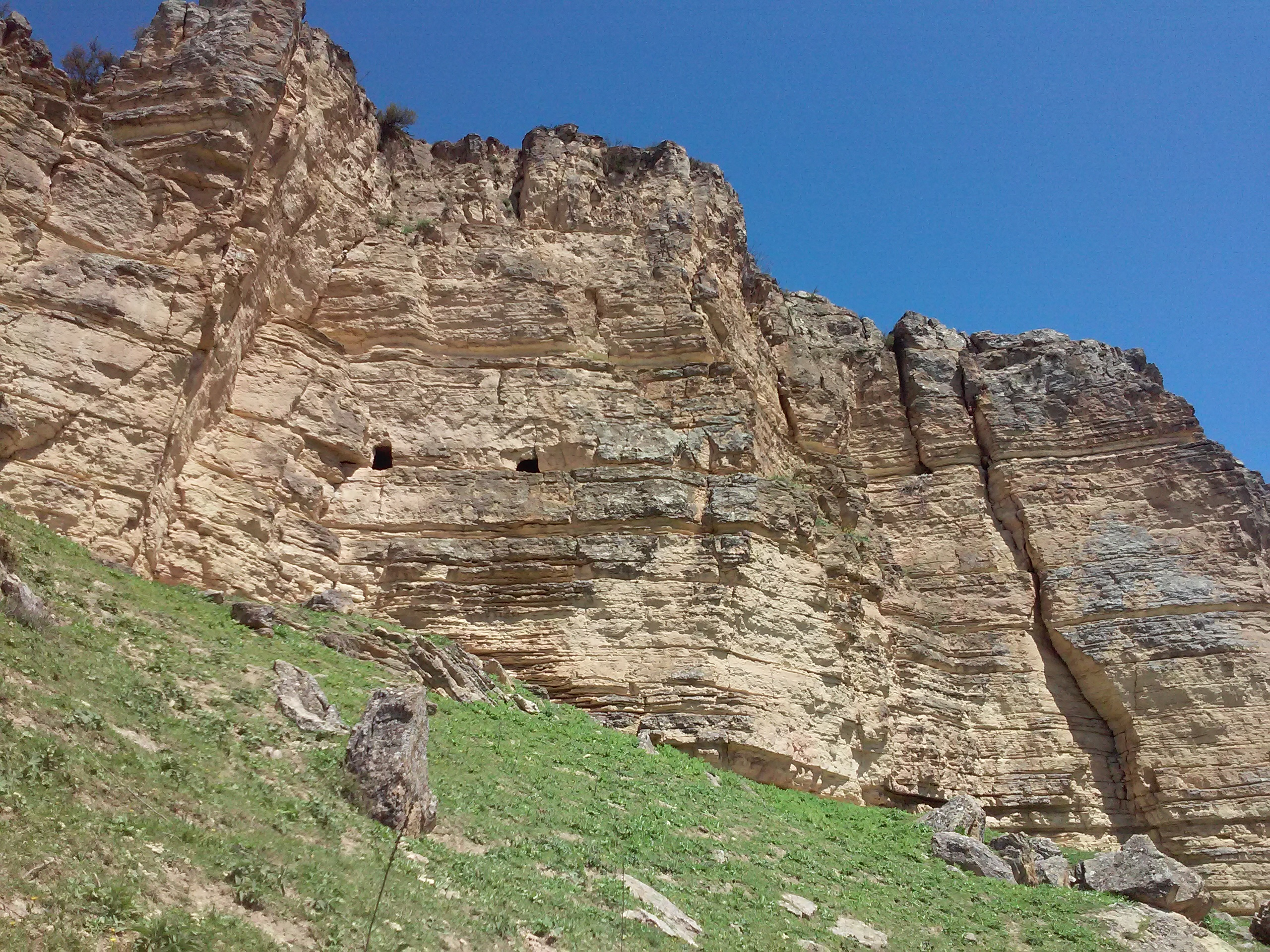
Cave in Gobustan District

== See also ==
- Geology of Azerbaijan
- Orography of Azerbaijan
- Stone Age in Azerbaijan
