= Geology of Arkansas =

The geology of Arkansas includes deep 1.4 billion year old igneous crystalline basement rock from the Proterozoic known only from boreholes, overlain by extensive sedimentary rocks and some volcanic rocks. The region was a shallow marine, riverine and coastal environment for much of the early Paleozoic as multi-cellular life became commonplace. At the end of the Paleozoic in the Permian the region experienced coal formation and extensive faulting and uplift related to the Ouachita orogeny mountain building event. Extensive erosion of new highlands created a mixture of continental and marine sediments and much of the state remained flooded even into the last 66 million years of the Cenozoic. In recent Pleistocene and Holocene time, glacial sediments poured into the region from the north, down major rivers, forming dunes and sedimentary ridges. Today, Arkansas has an active oil and gas industry, although hydraulic fracturing related earthquake swarms have limited extraction. Mining industries in the state also produce brines, sand, gravel and other industrial minerals.

== Stratigraphy and geologic history ==
The oldest rocks in Arkansas are igneous granites encountered in deep wells in the Ozarks and the northern part of the Mississippi Embayment, dated to be 1.4 billion years old. These felsic rocks likely formed sometime soon after the breakup of the supercontinent Columbia, into its component continents, including Laurentia, which today forms the stable basement rocks of most of North America.

The Precambrian, including the Archean and Proterozoic eons is poorly understood in Arkansas, but the entire state is believed to be underlain by deep, igneous and metamorphic crystalline basement rock. In the Ouachita region, geologists have found igneous and metamorphic Precambrian erratic boulders as well as metamorphosed igneous rock intrusions.

=== Cambrian (542-488 million years ago) ===
At the time of the Cambrian explosion, as multi-cellular became commonplace, Arkansas was primarily flooded by rivers and a shallow marine environment. In the Ozark region, calcareous, quartzose sand and clay deposited, while the Ouachita area witnessed the formation of alternating layers of sand, clay, silt and small amounts of lime mud.

=== Ordovician-Devonian (488-359 million years ago) ===
Water levels may have deepened in Arkansas with sand and clay depositing in a deep marine offshore trough environment in the Ouachita region, which shifted to siliceous ooze and clay by the Devonian. A shallow, near shore environment prevailed in the Ozarks, where thin layers of carbonates were interrupted by periodic erosion during the Ordovician. During the Devonian, carbonate deposition continued, but with added emplacement of carbonaceous clay, siliceous ooze and some shallow marine sand deposits.

=== Carboniferous-Permian (318-299 million years ago) ===
While a marine environment continued to prevail into the Mississippian, the period marked rapid clastic sedimentation in the Late Mississippian in the Ouachita region. The depositional environment in the Ozarks area remained much the same as in the Devonian for the Mississippian, but the region experienced rapid clastic sedimentation at the beginning of the Pennsylvanian. The Ozarks lack Early Pennsylvanian rocks.

Arkansas experienced widespread faulting in the Pennsylvanian, associated with the Ouachita orogeny mountain building event. As a result, the quickly accumulated sediments in the Ouachita deep marine trough were faulted, folded, experienced low-grade metamorphism, followed by uplift and the formation of numerous quartz veins.

A shallow environment of nearshore swamps formed in the Arkansas Valley region, bounded by newly formed faults, leading to subsequent coal formation from plant debris. The region experienced erosion during the Permian and widespread uplift of highlands as well as the continued formation of milky quartz veins.

=== Mesozoic (251-66 million years ago) ===
At the start of the Mesozoic, in the Triassic period, the highlands experienced continued erosion. Red clay, silt, sand, gravel and other sediments and small anhydrite deposits formed on land.

A marine transgression in the Jurassic brought a renewed marine environment. Red clay, carbonate sand and silt accumulated in a shallow sea. Large deposits of anhydrite from this period point to very high salinity in the water. These anhydrite deposits are emplaced in the subsurface of southern Arkansas.

In the Early Cretaceous, carbonates and clastic sediments accumulated in the shallow seas, along with gypsum and additional anhydrite. Approximately 100 million years, the downwarping of the Mississippi Embayment expanded the marine transgression, leading to the accumulation of marl, sand and chalk as well as volcanic debris cast off by volcanic activity in the region.

=== Cenozoic (66 million years ago-present) ===
In the Paleogene and Neogene periods of the Cenozoic (also traditionally known as the Tertiary), Arkansas experienced similar geologic events as in the Mesozoic.

In the Paleocene, nearshore reefs and dark marine clays formed in the flooded Mississippi Embayment. Bauxite developed on islands, formed from exposed Cretaceous igneous rock. During the Eocene, some bauxite was transported and a return to swampy conditions favored the formation of lignite low-grade coal. Throughout the Pliocene and Oligocene, the area experienced widespread erosion.

Much of the soil and sediments near the surface in Arkansas formed during the last 2.5 million years of the Quaternary. In the Pleistocene, zones of alpine snow pack, akin to small glaciers formed in the Ouachita Mountains and Boston Mountains. Periodic extensive glacial outwash from the Ohio River and Mississippi River produced Crowley's Ridge and both the Eastern Lowlands and Western Lowlands. Silt and sand formed loess and dunes. During the last 11,000 years of the Holocene, Arkansas has experienced additional deposition of alluvium due to Mississippi River floods. Sand dikes formed due to significant seismic activity in northeast Arkansas in the vicinity of the New Madrid Seismic Zone.

== Natural resource geology ==
Bauxite and zinc mining have both played a role in Arkansas' economy in the past, along with oil and natural gas, which are increasingly extracted from unconventional resources like the Fayetteville Shale.

=== Minerals & metals ===
Antimony was extracted from stibnite, hosted in quartz veins in Sevier County, Arkansas between 1873 and 1947, peaking in World War I and relying on a combination of shallow trenches and tunnels. In the Ouachita Mountains, manganese deposits also have as much as 1.2 percent cobalt, copper, nickel and lithium.

Arkansas has 19 minerals containing copper, including chalcopyrite, malachite and native copper, often situated in the Ozarks and Ouachitas. None form economically viable deposits. In the Ozarks, sphalerite is often found near faults in Paleozoic limestone and dolomite.

In addition to copper, there are numerous iron minerals, but few with economic deposits. Two small pig iron furnaces operated in the 1800s and a tiny open pit mine in the 1960s, near Rosston, Arkansas extracting only a few hundred tons. The largest production overall was 120,000 tons produced from the Wilcox Group where weathering of bedded siderite produced limonite concretions. In 2006, industrial minerals were valued at $913 million with production of bromine, Portland cement, crushed stone, lime and sand and gravel for construction.

=== Bauxite ===
In Arkansas, the aluminum hydroxides in bauxite form small oolites and pea-sized pisolites and outcrop or are located very close to the surface under thin sediments. The resource was first mined in 1898, 11 years after the State Geologist, John Branner, identified it in a sample from Pulaski County, Arkansas. In addition to the deposit in Pulaski County, south and east of Little Rock, there is a second deposit in Saline County, Arkansas close to Benton. During the Cretaceous and early Cenozoic, islands of syenite in the flooded Mississippi Embayment experienced tropical monsoon conditions and weathered into laterite, stripping away many elements and leaving sediment enriched in aluminum. Initially, Arkansas bauxite met 90% of US aluminum demand. Underground mining before and during World War II gave way to open pit mining in the 1960s. During the war, up to six million tons were mined in 1943. Arkansas bauxite mines were often passed over in favor of higher quality bauxite reserves in the Caribbean and mining ceased in 1982. The state has small amounts of gallium associated with bauxite deposits.

=== Oil and natural gas ===
Between 1920 and 2003, 1.8 billion barrels of oil were produced in Arkansas. Ten counties, spread across the southern part of the state, produce oil. They include Ashley, Bradley, Calhoun, Columbia, Hempstead, Lafayette, Miller, Nevada, Ouachita and Union, although Union, Lafayette, Columbia and Ouachita counties have historically accounted to 85% of total production.

El Dorado, Arkansas was the site of early prospecting. Fifty years before oil was discovered, William Brown's Union Coal Company built an oil refinery in 1860 to distill oil from lignite. Exploratory wells were drilled in the 1880s and other companies in Camden County tried to refine oil from lignite throughout the 1860s.

Oil exploration began in earnest in 1916 with an unsuccessful well east of El Dorado, in Union County (which at the time was known as Urbana County). A week after Samuel S. Hunter found modest amounts of oil in the Hunter No. 1 well near Stephens, Arkansas, the Constantin Oil and Refining Company found large amounts of oil and natural gas. Soon after, in 1921, a gusher in El Dorado spurted up to 10,000 barrels as far as a mile away. Oil production dramatically expanded throughout the 1920s, prompting railroads to run up to 22 trains a day between El Dorado, Shreveport and Little Rock.

At the boom's peak in 1925, 3,483 wells produced up to 73 million barrels of oil. The huge supply overwhelmed local railroads and much of the oil was stored in open pits, where it leached into groundwater or became useless from rainwater contamination. The Arkansas Conservation Commission launched lawsuits related to the spills in the 1920s and the state launched the Arkansas Oil and Gas Commission in 1939, which set out to regulate the industry and limit oil and gas waste, as well as spills of bromine-laden salt brine brought up from the wells.

Oil production dropped precipitously from 58 million barrels in 1926 to 12 million by 1932. However, the industry surged during World War II until the early 1960s, producing 30 million barrels annually. The Shuler and Magnolia pools in Union County, discovered in 1937, produced 110 million barrels over their lifespan. Only one new oil play was discovered in 1971 and by the early 2000s, production hovered slightly above seven million barrels. With changes toward unconventional resources in the 2000s, hydraulic fracturing began on the Fayetteville Shale. However, the fracking related Guy-Greenbrier earthquake swarm in August, 2010 prompted a slower approach to development.
