= Geology of Washington, D.C. =

The Geology of Washington, D.C., is broadly divisible into two regions. The northwestern quadrant of the city west of 16th Street lies mainly in the Appalachian Piedmont region, marked by moderate to steep hills underlain by metamorphic rocks of Ordovician through Devonian age, similar to the adjacent Piedmont regions of Montgomery County, Maryland. The National Mall, northeastern and southeastern quadrants of Washington lie in the mid-Atlantic Coastal Plain region, consisting of sedimentary deposits laid down during the early Cretaceous, late Paleocene, and the much more recent Tertiary and Quaternary periods, like the bordering areas of southern Maryland. Some areas in Northeast and Southeast Washington also feature hilly terrain, especially east of the Anacostia River; this however stems from rivers and creeks down-cutting into the relatively soft soil.

City founders George Washington and Pierre L'Enfant chose to locate the District of Columbia on the fall line of the Potomac River, the point furthest inland reachable by ships coming up the river. (See also Atlantic Seaboard fall line.) Below Roosevelt Island, the Potomac spills out onto the Coastal Plain, leaving the rock formations of Great Falls and the rocky cliffs of the Arlington, Virginia shore behind as it slows and widens. The Tidal Basin and the Washington Channel are part of this wider section of the river. Much of the National Mall was marsh in the early Nineteenth century; as the capital city grew, the marsh was filled in and reclaimed.
