= Geology of Azerbaijan =

An enlargeable topographic map of Azerbaijan.

The geology of Azerbaijan forms a constituent geological part of the Alpine fold belt. Sedimentary deposits embracing the southwestern parts of the Major and Minor Caucasus, including the intermountain Kur River trough, as well as the Mid- and South Caspian basins consist of diversity fold systems. The Earth's crust thickness in Azerbaijan varies in the range from 38 to 55 km. Its maximum thickness is observed in the Minor Caucasus area, while its minimum thickness is typical for the Talysh foothills. The geological setting of the area consists of sedimentary, volcanic-sedimentary, volcanic and terrestrial deposits embracing almost the entire stratigraphic range beginning from Pre-Cambrian through Holocene time.

== Minerals ==
Azerbaijan is rich of fuel ore and non-ore minerals. Ore and non-ore minerals are spread mostly in mountainous territories (Small and Great Caucasus), fossil fuels in plain territories and the South Caspian basin. In its turn, it caused the development of the ore industry in the west and the oil-gas industry in the east.

=== Fossil-fuel resources ===
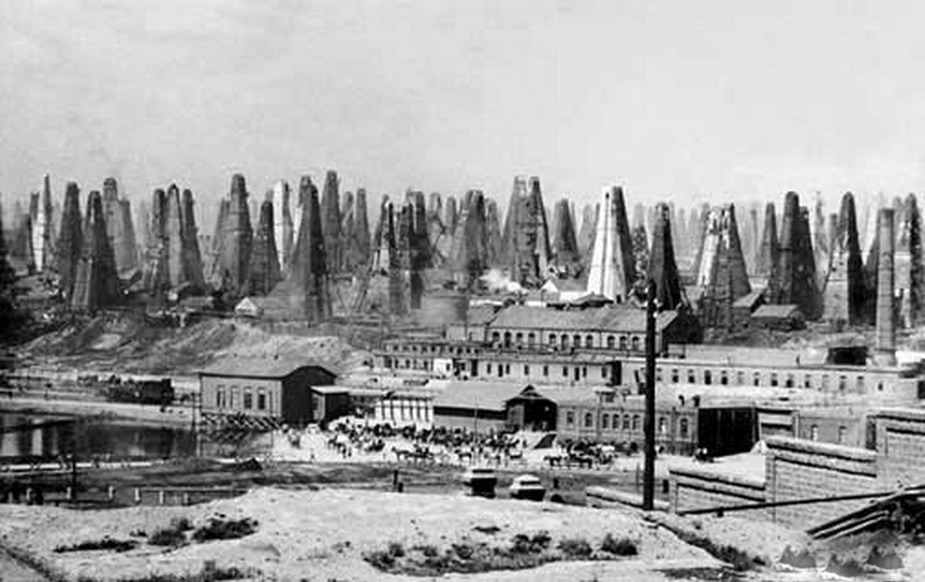
The Nobel Brothers oil wells in Balakhani, a suburb of Baku.

Fossil-fuel resources in Azerbaijan are presented by oil, gas, oil shale, peat etc. The petroleum industry is the most important sector of the local economy. Oil is produced from both onshore and Caspian offshore oilfields. Azerbaijan (particularly Absheron Peninsula) is referred to as the world's most ancient oil-producing region. Even during 7th–6th centuries BC oil had been extracted within the Absheron Peninsula and exported to many different countries. As of 1985 about 1.2 billion tons of crude oil has been produced in Azerbaijan (25% of which from offshore oilfields).

=== Metalliferous ore resources ===
Metalliferous ores (magnetite and hematite) in Azerbaijan fall into four generic classes: magmatic segregation, skarn-magnetite (contact-metasomatic), hydrothermal- metasomatic and sedimentary ones.

== Non-metallic mineral resources ==
Non-metallic mineral resources play a significant role in Azerbaijan's total balance of raw material resources. That group of raw materials includes rock salt, gypsum, anhydrite, alum, bentonite clay, construction materials, pyrite, borate, gemstones (precious and semi-precious stone), dolomite, Iceland spar, etc.

== Underground water ==
Underground water is considered to be one of the most important natural resources in Azerbaijan. Due to the differences in chemical composition, they fall into several types, such as service water, drinkable, medical waters, and waters used in various industrial sectors.

== Mud volcanoes ==
It is estimated that 300 of the planet's estimated 700 mud volcanoes sit in Eastern Azerbaijan and the Caspian Sea.

Mud volcanoes are pervasive within Azerbaijan. In local language, mud volcanoes are also known as "pilpila", "yanardag", "bozdagh", "ahtarma", "gaynarja" etc. There are over 220 mud volcanoes in Azerbaijan (Absheron Peninsula, Gobustan, southeast Shirvan plain, Samur-Davachi plain terrane, both Absheron and Baku Archipelago. The biggest are Galmas, Toragay, Big Kanizadag etc. Most of them have a cone shape. Their height varies in the range from 20 to 400m, whereas base diameter may vary from 100 to 4500m.

In 2001, one mud volcano 15 kilometers from Baku made world headlines when it suddenly started spewing flames 15 meters high.

== Seismicity ==
The first seismic station in Azerbaijan was established soon after 1902 in Baku by E. Nobel. Afterwards seismic stations were set in different areas in Azerbaijan (Balakhany, Zurnabd, Shamakhi, Ganja, Nakhchivan, Lankaran, Chilov Island, and Mingechevir).

Azerbaijan saw devastating earthquakes since ancient times. The first reports on "an overall devastating event that destroyed all towns and villages" is dated back to 427 AD. In 1139 AD, a devastating earthquake with the intensity of IX took place in Azerbaijan. The town of Ganja was destroyed completely and gross casualties were reported. Goygol Lake was generated as a result of that same earthquake.

In the AD 19th century, Shamahy town suffered several devastating earthquakes. Several of them that occurred in 1856, 1861, and 1872 and 1902 that are considered to be the strongest and most devastating were estimated to have an intensity of VII–X.

== See also ==
- Caves of Azerbaijan
