= Geology of South Dakota =

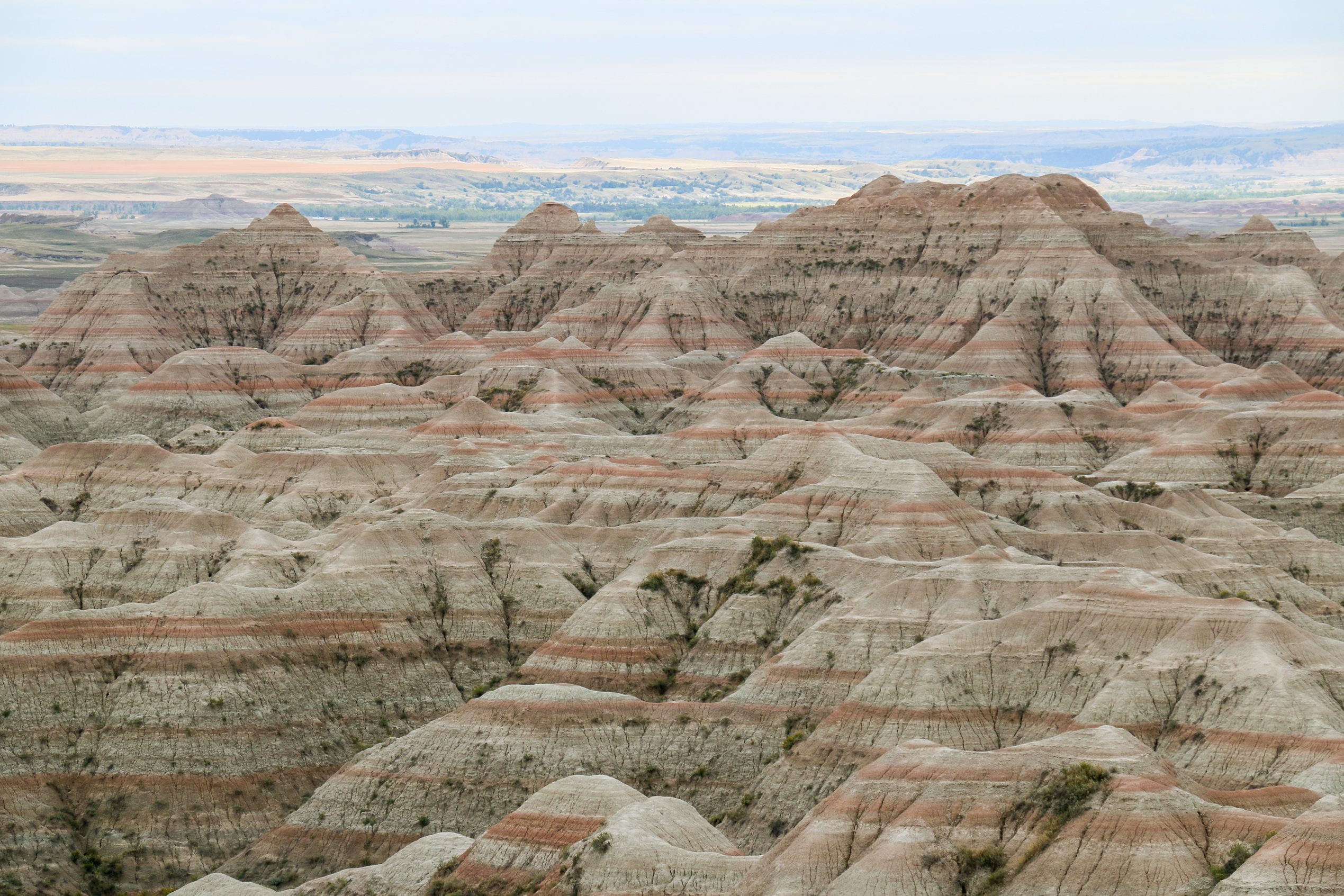
Badlands National Park

The geology of South Dakota began to form more than 2.5 billion years ago in the Archean eon of the Precambrian. Igneous crystalline basement rock continued to emplace through the Proterozoic, interspersed with sediments and volcanic materials. Large limestone and shale deposits formed during the Paleozoic, during prevalent shallow marine conditions, followed by red beds during terrestrial conditions in the Triassic. The Western Interior Seaway flooded the region, creating vast shale, chalk and coal beds in the Cretaceous as the Laramide orogeny began to form the Rocky Mountains. The Black Hills were uplifted in the early Cenozoic, followed by long-running periods of erosion, sediment deposition and volcanic ash fall, forming the Badlands and storing marine and mammal fossils. Much of the state's landscape was reworked during several phases of glaciation in the Pleistocene. South Dakota has extensive mineral resources in the Black Hills and some oil and gas extraction in the Williston Basin. The Homestake Mine, active until 2002, was a major gold mine that reached up to 8,000 feet (2,400 m) underground and is now used for dark matter and neutrino research.

== Stratigraphy, tectonics and geologic history ==
The oldest rocks in South Dakota date to the Archean eon of the Precambrian, over 2.5 billion years ago. The Archean crystalline basement rock formed with the intrusion of the Little Elk and Bear Mountain granites, with interceding periods of volcanic activity, mountain building and shale deposition. Marine sandstones and clays and deposited during the Proterozoic and the Harney Peak granite emplaced around 1.71 billion years ago. The Neoproterozoic was marked by a long period of erosion in the stratigraphic record.

=== Paleozoic (541–251 million years ago) ===
In the Cambrian, at the start of the Paleozoic in parallel with the rapid proliferation of multi-cellular life, terrestrial erosion continued in the region. The area was flooded during a large scale marine transgression in the Late Cambrian through the Ordovician, as limestone, sandstone and shale deposited. The Sioux quartzite was likely the only point of high topography, rising above a flat plain which was invaded with seawater. The Deadwood Formation formed during this period, exposed as a 400-foot thick unit in the walls of the Spearfish Canyon, ranging to 50 feet thick by Wind Cave. Cambrian rocks are only exposed in the Black Hills and disappear in boreholes drilled to the south of Wind Cave, beyond the ancient shoreline. However, the Deadwood Formation reaches a thickness of 700 feet in wells in the northwest.

The Deadwood Formation is beach sand and gravel at its base, but as the ancient shoreline moved eastward, thin layers of mudstone and limestone formed in the west, in deeper waters. The formation contains trilobite fossils and tracks left by worms, exposed at low tide. Intraformational conglomerate is also common, resulting from fragments of limestone broken up in waves The Silurian and Devonian were marked by more carbonate deposition, particularly within the Williston Basin, east to central South Dakota. During the Mississippian period of the Carboniferous, widespread terrestrial erosion affected all but the north-central part of the state. Additional limestone deposits formed in the Early Mississippian. A marine environment prevailed in the Pennsylvanian, as sandstones, carbonates and evaporites deposited.

Sea levels receded in the Permian, marked by erosion in the east and continued marine deposition in the west.

=== Mesozoic (251–66 million years) ===
Red beds formed throughout the west, during the Triassic, at the start of the Mesozoic. The region returned to terrestrial conditions in the Jurassic, with extensive erosion, and then returned to a shallow marine environment in the Cretaceous, depositing thick sequences of black Pierre shale—the thickest and most widespread sedimentary unit in the state. Originally, the shale ranged between 2500 feet thick at the Wyoming line and only tens of feet thick in the east, although erosion stripped it away in the Black Hills. The Laramide orogeny began the uplift of the Rocky Mountains during the Cretaceous.

West of the Missouri River, the Niobrara chalk formed in the inland sea during the Cretaceous, which contains mosasaur and plesiosaur bones. Tepee buttes form as small, conical hills in the Pierre shale landscape, from lenses of more erosion resistant limestone. Beach sand coal sequences left behind as the up to 200 feet thick Fox Hills Formation after the Western Interior Seaway began to recede, 15 million years after the Pierre shale first started to form. Low permeability shale yielded a poorly drained landscape, cut streams and rivers, which brought in large amounts of sediment—clay, silt and sand up to 500 feet thick—which deposited as the Hell Creek Formation. The formation contains thin lignite beds, along with dinosaur bones, most notably those of Triceratops and Tyrannosaurus.

Like many other locations around the world, South Dakota preserves the inch thick boundary clay, left by the asteroid impact of the K-Pg mass extinction 66 million years ago. Below the boundary clay, fossil pollen from large fields is common, but pollen is uncommon for a long period in the record afterward.

=== Cenozoic (66 million years ago-present) ===
Following the retreat of the Cretaceous inland sea, the Black Hills were uplifted, accompanied by igneous activity in the Paleocene at the start of the Cenozoic. The Pierre shale east of the Black Hills eroded into an undulating plain. The Ludlow Formation is up to 350 feet thick and in the northwest contains no obvious break in continental deposition at the time of the mass extinction, except for being sandier and less well-cemented. Further east, the formation contains the subsidiary Cannonball Formation, deposited during a brief resurgence of the inland sea and bearing fossil oysters, snails and clams. The 300 feet of sandstone and lignite of the Tongue River Formation overlies the Ludlow Formation, getting thicker to the east and holding some of the major coal deposits found in northern Wyoming.

In the northwest, the Ludlow, Cannonball and Tongue River formations are categorized as the Fort Union Group, with thick sandstone layers sourced from the Rocky Mountains.

Throughout the Eocene, the Black Hills eroded, shedding debris into the east, during a period with sub-tropical temperatures. Iron pyrite in shales oxidized, becoming bright red and yellow iron oxides. Sediments did not accumulate in the region until the end of the Eocene, as large streams carried material away to the ocean. Volcanic rocks from the Eocene preserve petrified trees.

The Oligocene brought a shift in the climate to arid conditions, transforming the region into a vast alluvial desert plain. Up to 600 feet of sands and clays, buried the Black Hills within 2000 feet of their crests in western South Dakota, forming the White River Formation, while some erosion occurred in the east. Gravel deposits containing crocodile bones and land snails, tortoises and hackberry seeds are also common in the fossil record. Bird bones and even fossil duck eggs have been found in association with clams, snails and the remains of algal mats in temporary ponds.

Since the 1800s, geologists have debated how to subdivide the White River Formation. The Chadron Formation is the lower unit, covering over the oxidizing Eocene erosion surface and reaching up to 180 feet thick. The thickness of the formation varies widely, where it fills into pre-existing valleys or blankets hills. It contains light-green bentonite clay, with a high shrink-swell capacity, as well as lenses of limestone containing snail, clam and algae remains from ponds. Titanotherium fossils and other large mammals have been found in the formation. Due to the high concentration of clay and the ease with which it erodes, the Chadron Formation tends to form gentle sloping hills and buttes. The overlying Brule Formation encompasses clay laid down by water, windblown sand, silt and volcanic ash, with a maximum thickness of up to 450 feet. Desert caliche soils are sometimes preserved as lime nodules and small clay buttes are often capped by well-cemented channel sands and gravels. The Brule Formation erodes into the jagged pinnacles of the Badlands. By the late 1990s, paleontologists had discovered 150 genera of mammals, ranging between rodents and rhinoceroses, as well as horses and camels. At the end of its five million year deposition, the formation was capped with the brilliantly white Rocky Ford ash, the windfall from powerful rhyolite eruptions in the Western Cascades in Oregon.

Smaller volumes of light-colored sand and clay deposited in the Miocene, but the period came with a return to warm and wet conditions. Revitalized streams carried away large amounts of sediments, wiping out much of the White River Formation. Hundreds of feet of younger sediment cover the White River group in southwest South Dakota. Miocene sandstones, which often form cliffs, often overlay the White River Formation.

A period of erosion occurred in South Dakota during the Pliocene. Particularly in western South Dakota, the mobilization of coarse sediments formed the Ogallala aquifer. In the Pleistocene ice ages, South Dakota experienced multiple sequences of glaciation. The oldest glacial drift deposits are in the southeast, at Sioux Falls and Newton Hills, overlain by deeply weathered Illinoisan, or potentially pre-Illinoisan age material. A large expanse of till fills the James River lowland and beyond the Missouri River, with an uncertain age, often thought to be the Wisconsin glaciation. The Brookings till plain is a belt of heavily weathered ground moraine, running through Brookings. Dating to the Illinoisan, it escaped burial by the Wisconsin ice sheet. A narrow strip in the central Prairie Hills holds the Toronto till plain, the oldest definitively Wisconsin drift, while the Bemis stage on the eastern edge of the hills formed a belt of moraines. Although the ice did not advance east of the Prairie Hills, it left a remaining moraine ridge, known as the Altamont stage, which encroaches the western side of the hills. Late in the Wisconsin, the ice sheet divided at the Prairie Hills, extending the Des Moines lobe to the east and a western lobe along the James River valley. A final advance of the glacier, known as the Big Stone stage, traced the Minnesota River lowland in the northeast.

== Natural resource geology ==
The Black Hills were extensively explored and periodically mined for silver, gold, mica, tungsten, feldspar, bentonite, beryl, lead, zinc, uranium, lithium and sand, as well as oil, beginning in the 1870s. The Homestake Mining Company, which managed the Homestake Mine until its closure in 2002, merged the Deadwood, Golden Terra, Father DeSmet and Caledonia gold mines around 1900. Its employees used emerging pneumatic drill technology and cyanide processing, creating the Ross Shaft and Yates Shaft—both 5000 feet deep—by 1941. Mine activity was suspended during World War II and resumed. By the mine's centennial in 1976, it was 8000 feet deep and had produced 31 million ounces of gold, seven million ounces of silver and 115 million tons of milled ore.

After its closure, the location was deemed a Superfund site, although the shafts are now reused for the Sanford Underground Research Facility, the largest underground laboratory in the US, used for dark matter and neutrino research. Southwest of Lead, South Dakota, there is still an active open pit gold mine, run by Goldcorp.

South Dakota has oil and gas production in the Williston Basin in the northwest, although it produces only one percent of the US total, primarily from traditional vertical wells. One hundred wells produce 1.6 million gallons of oil annually. Almost all production is centered in a 400 square mile area within Harding County, relying on the Red River Formation.

== Bibliography ==
- Driscoll, Daniel G.; Carter, Janet M.; Williamson, Joyce E.; Putnam, Larry D. (1990). "Hydrology of the Black Hills Area, South Dakota" (PDF). USGS.
- Gries, John Paul (1996). Roadside geology of South Dakota. Mountain Press Publishing Company.
