= Allar Cave =

Cave and archaeological site in Azerbaijan

- Allar mağarası (Azerbaijani)
- location in Azerbaijan
- 38°55′14″N 48°13′15″E
- Periods: Middle Paleolithic
- Location: Allar village
- Region: Yardymli Rayon, Azerbaijan

Allar Cave (Azerbaijani: Allar mağarası) is an archaeological site and Middle Paleolithic human settlement. The cave is situated on the left bank of the Vilesh River, in Allar village, Yardymli Rayon, Azerbaijan, at an altitude of 1,500 metres (4,900 ft) above sea level.

The cave was discovered in 1993 during an archeological expedition organized by the Institute of Archeology and Ethnography of the Azerbaijan National Academy of Sciences, under the guidance of A.G. Jafarov. The expedition uncovered nine Middle Paleolithic stone items.
