= Geology of Jamaica =

The Geology of Jamaica is formed of rocks of Cretaceous to Neogene age. The basement consists of Cretaceous island arc and back-arc basin sequences that formed above a subduction zone. The cover is of mainly Eocene to Miocene shallow water limestones, that have been uplifted due to the presence of a restraining bend along the major strike-slip faults that bound the southern edge of the Gonâve Microplate to the north of the island.

== Cretaceous ==
Rocks of this age occur as a series of inliers within the younger limestones.

== Rift basins ==
Rifting during the Paleogene led to the formation of rift basins in which thick sequences of clastic rocks were deposited that are exposed at the eastern end of the island in the John Crow and Wagwater belts.

== Limestones ==
During the Eocene, limestone deposition started across the whole of the Nicaraguan Rise. In Jamaica the main limestone unit is the White Limestone Group, which dominates the surface exposure of the island, particularly its central parts and consists of pure limestones and dolomites. Locally the lowermost limestone is the Yellow Limestone Group, which consists of interbedded limestones and other clastic rocks.

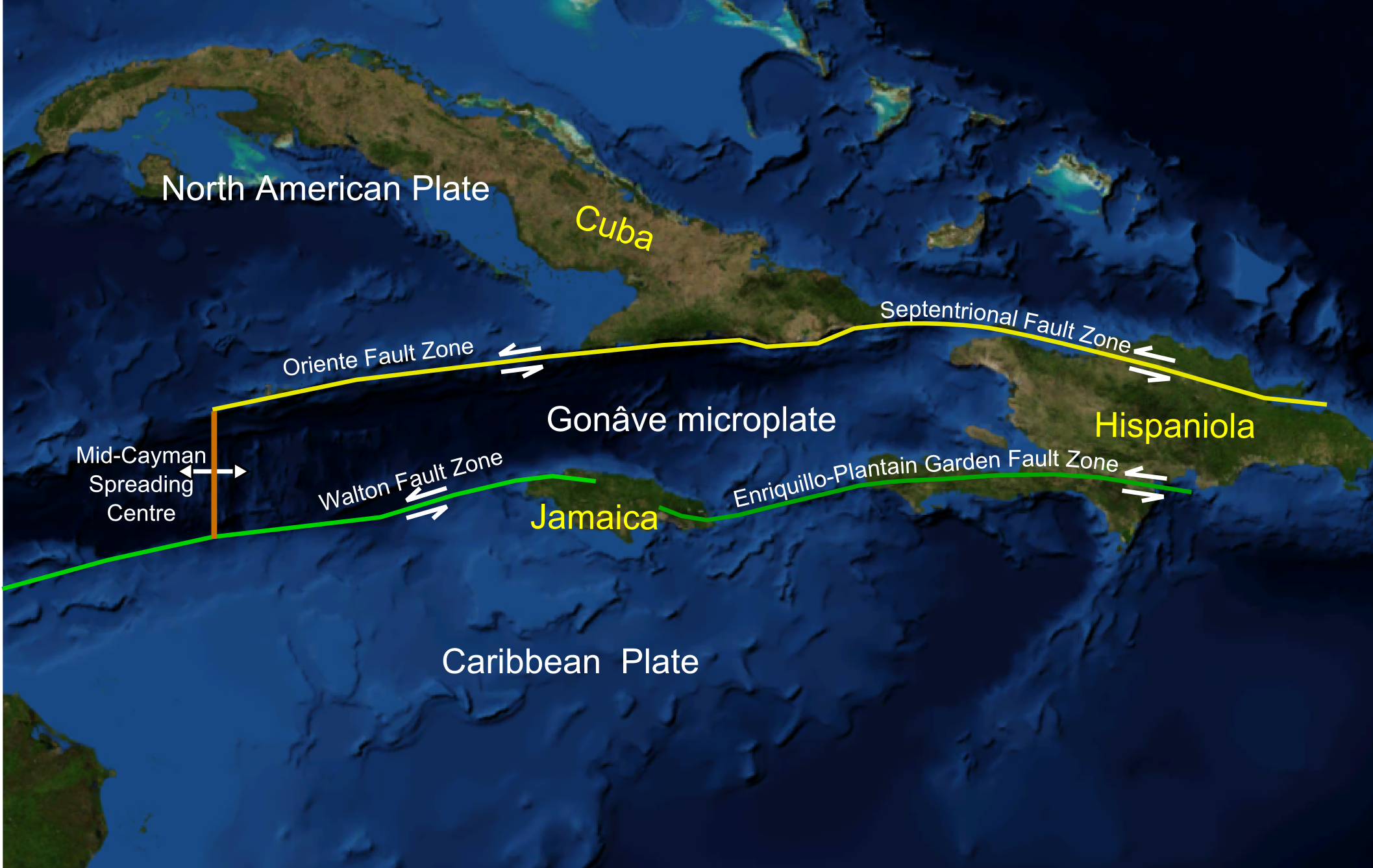
The position of Jamaica relative to major strike-slip fault zones

== Restraining bend ==
During the Late Miocene, the northeastern margin of the Caribbean Plate began to collide with the Bahamas Platform. This caused the formation of a two new strike-slip fault zones between the island of Hispaniola and the Mid-Cayman Spreading Center west of Jamaica, the Enriquillo-Plantain Garden fault zone and the Walton fault zone. These fault zones now form part of the southern boundary of the Gonâve Microplate. The major right-stepping offset between the fault zones formed a restraining bend and led to transpression and uplift that is still active today and is the reason that the island of Jamaica is now well above sea level.
