= Geology of Mississippi =

The geology of Mississippi includes some deep igneous and metamorphic crystalline basement rocks from the Precambrian known only from boreholes in the north, as well as sedimentary sequences from the Paleozoic. The region long experienced shallow marine conditions during the tectonic evolutions of the Mesozoic and Cenozoic, as coastal plain sediments accumulated up to 45,000 feet thick, including limestone, dolomite, marl, anhydrite and sandstone layers, with some oil and gas occurrences and the remnants of Cretaceous volcanic activity in some locations.

== Geologic history, stratigraphy and tectonics ==
The Black Warrior Basin was the southern margin of the proto-North American continent Laurentia. Precambrian rocks have only been found in a few boreholes in the north of the state, including microperthite granite and a syenite sample dated to 785 million years ago in the Proterozoic. The oldest documented basement granites are 790 million years old while researchers Thomas and Osborne, in 1987 found gneiss up to 1.12 billion years old.

=== Paleozoic (539-251 million years ago) ===
During the Ordovician, the 650 foot thick Knox Dolomite, Stones River Group and Nashville Group sediments formed in the shallow marine platform environment of the Black Warrior Basin. Shale, limestone and undifferentiated sediments comprise the Wayne Group and Brownsport Formation from the Silurian, overlain by Devonian chert and the Chattanooga shale. Some Devonian rocks contain trilobite fossils. A number of different formations took shape during the Carboniferous, including the Floyd Shale, intermixed with several different sandstone layers and overlain by the Pottsville Formation.

Shallow seas dropped between the Mississippian and Pennsylvanian around 330 million years ago. During the formation of the supercontinent Pangea, sediments in the Black Warrior Basin were uplifted and faulted as the region experienced dry, continental conditions.

=== Mesozoic (251-66 million years ago) ===
The Mississippi Interior Salt Basin underlies southern and west-central Mississippi with up to 3000 feet of Late Jurassic salt and 50 shallow salt domes. It formed during the beginnings of the Gulf of Mexico during the breakup of Pangea. Triassic igneous sills injected into shales in the Black Warrior Basin during the rifting process.

Salt deposition ended by 150 million years ago. Mantle upwelling thinned the crust in the Jurassic. In Mississippi, the Smackover Limestone covered over earlier evaporite deposits.

A complex stratigraphic sequence formed during the Cretaceous, with the reef limestones, anhydrite and sandstones of the Rodessa Formation, Mooringsport Formation, Paluxy Formation, Gordo Formation and Coker Formation, overlain by the Eutaw Group, Austin Chalk, Selma Chalk and numerous thin marl, chalk and sandstone layers.

The Richton Salt Dome was briefly famous in the early 1980s as a proposed site for US nuclear waste disposal. A volcano built the Jackson Dome, uplifting the Eutaw Formation on a 184 square mile island. Magma and thermal gas created halos in the Smackover Limestone, Norphlet Sandstone and Cotton Valley Group rich in hydrogen sulfide and carbon dioxide and over-pressurized gas is a risk in the poor quality gas fields on the southeastern side of Jackson Dome. The Midnight Volcano in southern Humphreys County is another buried volcanic feature from 75 million years ago in the Cretaceous.

=== Cenozoic (66 million years ago-present) ===
During the Cenozoic, the Mississippi Embayment was filled by large river and delta systems, depositing sediments reaching up to 45,000 feet thick beneath the Gulf Coastal Plain and 35,000 feet in the Terrebonne Trench, west of the Mississippi River. In the Paleocene, the Midway Group limestone, marl and sand lenses formed, followed by the Wilcox Group into the Eocene. Shale, sandstone and limestone typified the Eocene Claiborne Group and Jackson Group, with a greater presence of limestone in the Oligocene Vicksburg Group. Thicker units such as the Catahoula and Hattiesburg Formations formed in the Miocene, followed by the Pascagoula Formation, Graham Ferry Formation and Citronelle Formation into the Pliocene. Alluvium, sand, gravel, barrier islands and loess define most of the Quaternary deposition from the past 2.5 million years.

== Soils ==
Soils in Mississippi result from the weathering of bedrock, fine grained alluvial fill and loess (windblown glacial rock flour from the Mississippi River Alluvial Plain). The high fertility soils of the Loess Belt attracted many people to pursue plantation agriculture in the 1800s. Hardwood trees dominate in loess deposits north of Vicksburg, particularly sweet gum, basswood, water oak, cherrybark, poplar and bitternut. A few small prairies developed atop Cretaceous and Eocene chalk.

== Hydrogeology ==
The state has up to 125,000 water wells, with the most significant pumping from the Mississippi River alluvial aquifer for agriculture. Analysis of 1369 water wells from 1989 to 2007 found only three wells with unsafe levels of pesticides and agricultural chemicals. The Miocene, Wilcox, Sparta, Lower Cretaceous and Tuscaloosa are the next most important aquifers after the Mississippi River aquifer. Historically, the thick Yazoo Clay made groundwater difficult to extract on the Jackson Prairie.

== Natural resource geology ==
The discovery of the Amory Gas Field in Monroe County in 1926 and Jackson Gas Field in 1929 propelled the state to become an oil and gas producer. Oil was first produced from the Tinsley Field from the Late Cretaceous and the state had already produced over one billion barrels by 1970. A few wells were drilled as much as 20,000 feet deep.

Aside from amateur collecting Mississippi does not have mineable mineral resources.
