= Geology of Svalbard =

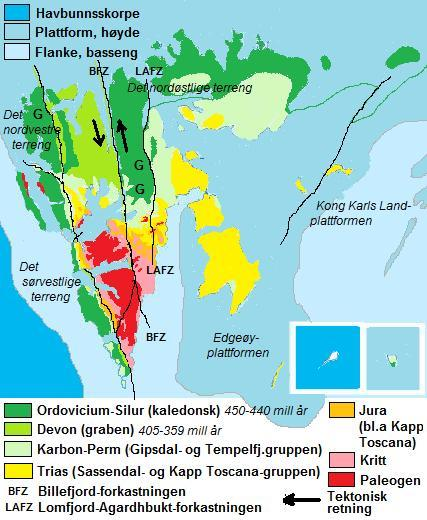
Geological map of Svalbard

The geology of Svalbard encompasses the geological description of rock types found in Svalbard, and the associated tectonics and sedimentological history of soils and rocks. The geological exploration of Svalbard is an ongoing activity, and recent understandings may differ from earlier interpretations.

== Geological Basement ==
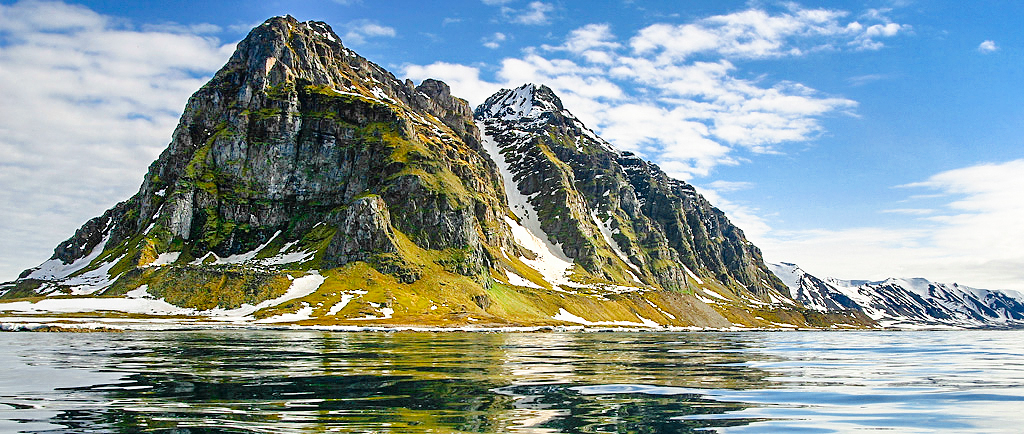
The headland of Fuglehuken, north on Prins Karls Forland, consists of Proterozoic and Cambrian rocks.

Geological basement dated from Precambrian, Cambrian, Ordovician and Silurian, originally termed Hecla Hoek, is found in three different provinces. The southwestern terrain comprises Prins Karls Forland, Oscar II Land, Nordenskiöld Land west of Grønfjorden and Wedel Jarlsberg Land . The northwestern terrain includes Haakon VII Land and Albert I Land. The northeastern terrain comprises Nordaustlandet and the northeastern parts of Spitsbergen.

== Devonian ==
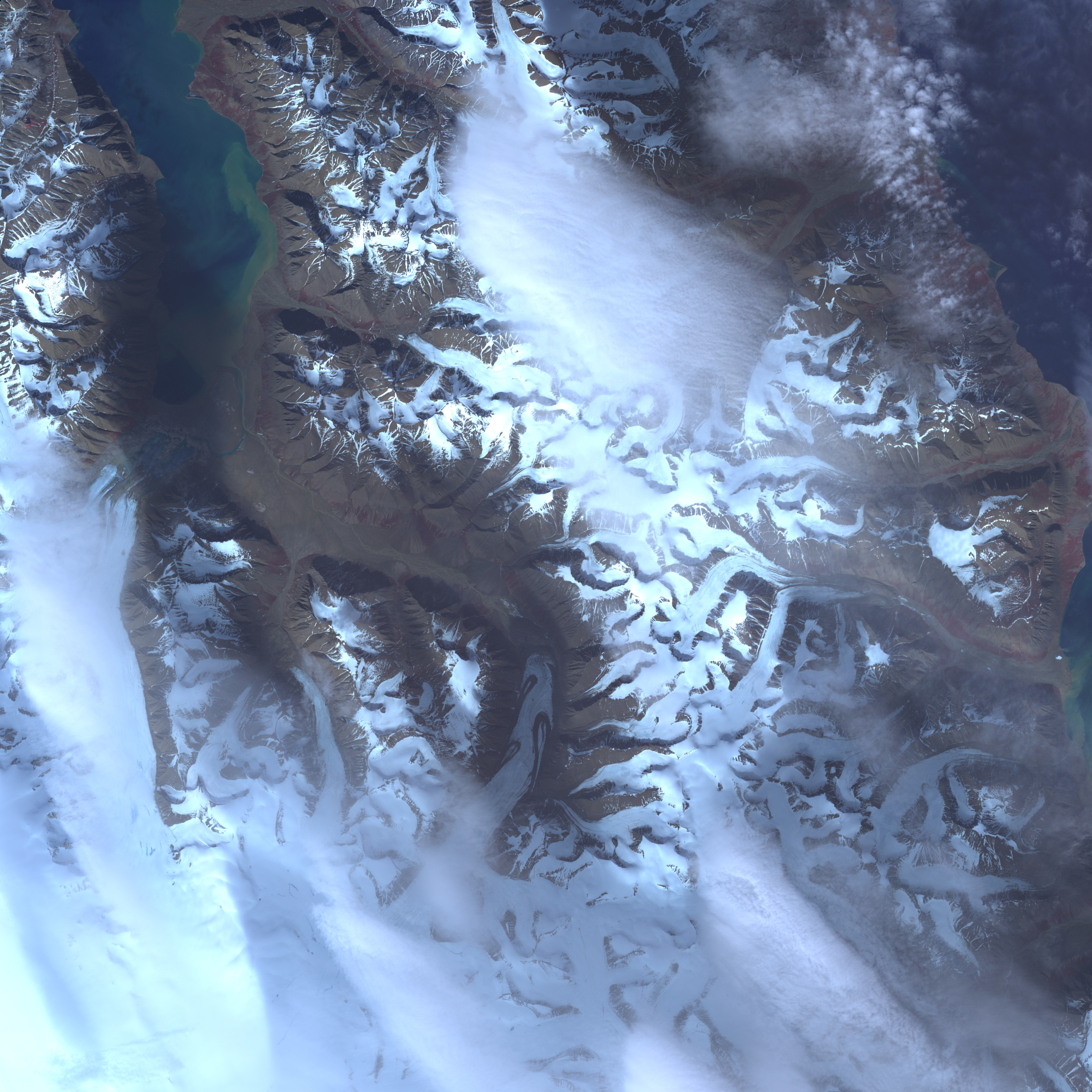
Satellite photo showing Devonian mountains in Andrée Land

Devonian age sediments are exposed in Andrée Land, James I Land and Dickson Land. Orogeny took place in late Devon.

== Carboniferous and Permian ==
During Carboniferous and Permian, rift basins were formed. Carboniferous strata are found along Billefjorden, and Permian formations dominate Billefjorden, Tempelfjorden and Lomfjorden.

== Triassic ==
Triassic rocks are found at the southern part of Spitsbergen, at Edgeøya, Barentsøya and Kong Karls Land. It is particularly visible at Edgeøya, Barentsøya and in eastern part of Olav V Land. Triassic outcrops are exposed in a long and narrow belt between pre-Triassic sediments along the west coast and the post-Triassic sediments of the central basin.

The Triassic rock units are divided into the Sassendalen Group, dating from Early Triassic to Late Middle Triassic, and the succeeding Kapp Toscana Group.

== Jurassic, Cretaceous and Cenozoic ==
Jurassic, Cretaceous and Cenozoic rocks are exposed in the middle southern part of Spitsbergen.

Coal deposits from Paleogene are exploited in Longyearbyen (including Svea) and Barentsburg.

The post-glacial rebound is estimated to be up to three kilometers in central Spitsbergen, while only a few hundred meters at Kong Karls Land.
