= Geology of South Carolina =

The Geology of South Carolina consists of six distinct geologic regions, the Blue Ridge Mountain Region, the Piedmont, the Sand Hills, the Inner Coastal Plain, the Outer Coastal Plain, and the Coastal Zone.
