= Geology of Virginia =

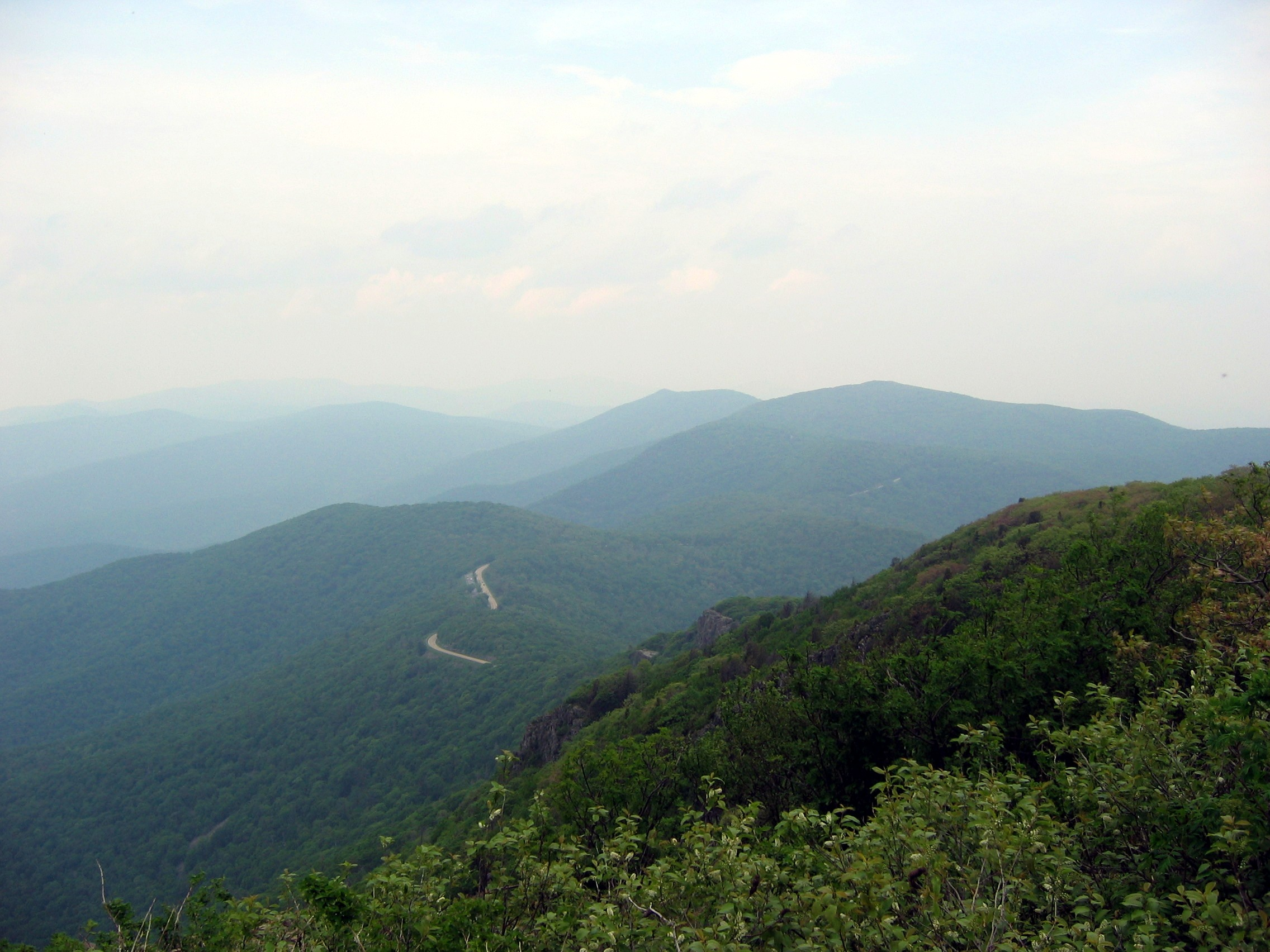
Top of Stonyman Summit, Shenandoah National Park

The geology of Virginia began to form at least 1.8 billion years ago. The oldest rocks in the state were metamorphosed during the Grenville orogeny, a mountain-building event beginning 1.2 billion years ago in the Proterozoic, which obscured older rocks. Throughout the Proterozoic and Paleozoic, Virginia experienced igneous intrusions, carbonate and sandstone deposition, and a series of other mountain-building events which defined the terrain of the inland parts of the state. The closing of the Iapetus Ocean formed the supercontinent Pangaea, and created additional small landmasses, some of which are now hidden beneath thick Atlantic Coastal Plain sediments. The region subsequently experienced the rifting open of the Atlantic ocean in the Mesozoic, the development of the Coastal Plain, isolated volcanism, and a series of marine transgressions that flooded much of the area. Virginia has extensive deposits of coal, oil, and natural gas, as well as deposits of other minerals and metals, including vermiculite, kyanite and uranium.

== Stratigraphy, tectonics and geologic history ==
In the Proterozoic, the Blue Ridge region formed between the Roanoke River and Potomac River during the Grenville orogeny 1.2 to one billion years ago. The metamorphism of pre-existing rock obscured evidence of the earlier geology of the region. Geologists believe that older pre-Grenville rocks were granulite gneiss, interbedded with volcanic and sedimentary rocks, dating back to 1.8 billion years ago.

Igneous charnockite, with large amounts of blue quartz, rocks also formed during the Grenville event. The unusual crystallization suggests that the rocks formed in a low-water crustal environment. In Roseland, between Charlottesville and Lynchburg, is a nine-mile-long intrusion of the 90 percent plagioclase feldspar rock anorthosite, the formation of which remains poorly understood by geologists. The Roseland area was a major source of titanium for many years.

For 500 million years until the beginning of the Phanerozoic terrestrial erosion wore down the Grenville rocks. Igneous activity resumed in the Eocambrian 600 million years ago. Magma ascended through the crust, but stopped due to a high-density zone and through a process of fractional crystallization, cooled to form basalt. Overlying rocks melted to form granitic magma and erupted as rhyolite on the northern end of the Blue Ridge, intruding overlying granulite and charnockite. The Robertson River granite, with a 70-mile-long outcrop is a remnant of this felsic melting.

To the west of the Blue Ridge, the Chilhowee Group sandstones formed thick sequences, recording a beach environment in Iapetus Ocean.

=== Paleozoic ===
For 100 million years in the Cambrian and Ordovician, eastern North America was covered in a shallow tropical sea. In parallel with the proliferation of multi-cellular life, large carbonate deposits, including sequences of limestone and dolomite formed, together with sandstone deposits. The closing of the Iapetus Ocean attached the Inner Piedmont belt and the Smith River allochthon to the Virginia Piedmont.

Sediments shed during the Taconic orogeny covered the new terranes, as the trough filled during the Silurian. The Tuscarora and Massanutten sandstones formed as a massive shoal during this period. Geologically recent erosion of Paleozoic carbonates forms the many gorges in the Valley and Ridge province, as well as caves.

During the late Silurian into the early Devonian, the region was relatively quiet for 40 million years, with little activity besides the deposition of some carbonate banks. However, the Iapetus Ocean was still closing, adding additional small terranes to the region, including one which is likely concealed by Coastal Plain sediments. Mountains, uplifted during the Acadian orogeny shed clays, which formed shale deposits during the Devonian in the trough.

In the Mississippian and Pennsylvanian periods of the Carboniferous, large tropical swamps formed in the west and were periodically buried with clay, to form coal deposits.

By the time of the Alleghanian orogeny 320 million years ago, the Iapetus Ocean was completely sealed. Tectonic forces formed the Massanutten synclinorium and other small synclines and anticlines in the Valley and Ridge province. A thrust fault, forced the rocks of the Blue Ridge on top of the Shenandoah Valley. As a result, rock formations from the Cambrian through the Silurian are stacked twice in the Shenandoah Valley. Sandstones remained intact, but some shales were metamorphosed to phyllite during the Alleghanian orogeny. Veins filled with quartz, calcite and pyrite.

=== Mesozoic (251-66 million years ago) ===
In the early Mesozoic, the rifting apart of the supercontinent Pangaea to form the Atlantic Ocean, created large rift basins, which filled with sediments—ultimately forming the Atlantic Coastal Plain. The oldest basins in Virginia date to the Triassic and Jurassic. The Cretaceous rocks of the Potomac Group cover these older sedimentary rocks. The Potomac Group is subdivided into the Patapsco Formation and Patuxent Formation, which comprise gravel conglomerate, sandstones and sandy clay that often outcrops along rivers.

In the Jurassic, volcanic activity in Blue Ridge formed isolated volcanoes, as well as dikes and sills in the Valley and Ridge province. Examples include Mole Hill, to the west of Harrisonburg, and Trimble Knob in Monterey. Natural Chimneys Regional Park preserves a thin basalt sill, near the base of pinnacles of limestone.

=== Cenozoic (66 million years ago-present) ===
In the Paleocene period of the Cenozoic, high sea levels from the Cretaceous dropped, bringing an increase in terrestrial erosion. The sedimentary rocks of the Pamunkey Group formed during a marine transgression in the Eocene. The component Aquia and Nanjemoy formations contains sand, clay, small gypsum crystals, green glauconite grains as well as fossils.

35.5 million years ago in the Eocene, a bolide (meteor) that impacted what is now Eastern Shore of Virginia created the Chesapeake Bay impact crater. Depositing a layer of breccia, the crater had long term effects on later sediment deposits, shifting the location where the Chesapeake Bay would eventually form.

Sea levels dropped again during the Oligocene, only to return to widespread inundation during the Miocene and Pliocene, depositing the two cycles of the Chesapeake Group. The Calvert, Choptank and Saint Marys formations are the lower group, deposited in the Miocene, while the Eastover and Yorktown formations deposited from the late Miocene into the Pliocene. The two phases of deposition are marked by sand, clay and coquina. Cornwallis Cave is eroded into the cross-bedded coquinas of the Yorktown formation, along with the sea cliffs at Westmoreland State Park (which also exposes underlying Eastover and Choptank rocks).

During the 1.8 million years of the Pleistocene, sea levels rose and fell six times, dropping 400 feet during the last glacial maximum. The Chesapeake Bay was not present for the first half of the Pleistocene due to low sea levels. The Windsor and Charles City formations formed along an open coastline during this time. The surficial Shirley formation, beneath what is now Newport News and Hampton, deposited during the Middle Pleistocene, reaching the York and James River estuaries. The Tabb formation formed during the late Pleistocene. Estuary, beach and swamp deposits have become much more numerous in the last 11,000 years of the Holocene.

== Hydrogeology ==
Virginia has only two natural lakes: Lake Drummond and Mountain Lake. The origin of both lakes is unclear. Due to unconsolidated sediments, Lake Drummond should have eroded very quickly. Some geologists have proposed that it may have formed from a meteorite impact. Mountain Lake appears to be a natural dam, formed by the Clinch sandstone, which impounded a mountain stream.

The state has nine major river basins.

== Natural resource geology ==
In colonial times and earlier periods of American history, Virginia had active mining for lead, zinc, gold, and titanium. However, metal mining had ceased by the late 20th century. Danville, Virginia hosts the largest deposits of uranium ore in North America, but uranium mining is prohibited by Virginia state law.

In 1986, 850 different mines produced 40 million tons of coal, valued at $1.5 billion, in 1985 US dollars. Oil and gas are produced in the western Valley and Ridge province. At the same time, 250 to 300 quarries were producing limestone, granite, slate, soapstone and gravel. Willis Mountain, near US 15 between US 60 and US 460 hosts the largest kyanite mine in the world, supplying the automotive spark plug and high-temperature kiln industry. Virginia also has significant vermiculite production.

== See also ==
- Coles Hill uranium deposit
