= Geology of Nebraska =

The geology of Nebraska is part of the broader geology of the Great Plains of the central United States. Nebraska's landscape is dominated by surface features, soil and aquifers in loosely compacted sediments, with areas of the state where thick layers of sedimentary rock outcrop. Nebraska's sediments and sedimentary rocks lie atop a basement of crystalline rock known only through drilling.

== Geologic history, bedrock geology and stratigraphy ==
The land that is today Nebraska originated as a juvenile crust expansion of the continent Laurentia—today part of the North American Craton and the core of the North American continent—between 1.8 and 1.6 billion years ago (Ga). Tectonic models suggest that Laurentia was part of the supercontinent Columbia but returned to being an independent continent between 1.35 and 1.3 billion years ago after which it became joined first to Protorodinia and the supercontinent Rodinia by 1.07 Billion years ago (Ga).

The Precambrian basement rocks of Nebraska are known from the large number of wells bored in the state, which reveal large terranes of gneissic granitic rock, muscovite schist, biotite schist, quartzite and metasedimentary rocks. Although drilling has revealed small instances of amphibolite and metavolcanic rock, gabbro and anorthosite, no mafic or plutonic rocks have been found in Nebraska or neighboring states. Research in the 1970s revealed little metamorphic rock overall with a preponderance of sheared granite and granodiorite making up 60% of basement rock. Although Nebraskan basement rock began to form during the Precambrian, the oldest rocks preserved at the surface in the state date to Carboniferous and to a period known to the US geology community as the Pennsylvanian approximately 315 million years ago. Tectonics researcher Christoper Scolese suggests that vast inland seas inundated much of southern and western Nebraska ten million years before the start of the Carboniferous rainforest collapse and the mass die off of many large amphibians. By the Lower Pennsylvanian, proto-Nebraska was a heavily eroded and faulted landscape. Earlier Paleozoic rocks had already been removed by the Nemaha Uplift, now situated in southeast Nebraska, and by the Cambridge Arch in western Nebraska.

By 300 million years ago (Ma), in the Upper Pennsylvanian, Nebraska was fully inundated by shallow seas leading to the deposition of distributed black shales and cyclothem deposits. At 290 million years ago (Ma), during the Cisuralian Epoch, limestones were deposited in Nebraska as sea levels fluctuated. Shale, limestone and sandstone mark the Permian rocks of this period along with gypsum and halite deposits that suggest rapid desiccation in an arid climate. Nebraska transitioned to terrestrial conditions by 275 million years ago (Ma), with limited marine activity, coal swamps and paleosols preserving the climate of the period. Stratigraphically, an unconformity occurs around 260 Ma, indicating terrestrial erosion conditions. The full geochronology of the Mesozoic is unknown in Nebraska because Triassic and Jurassic rocks are not preserved. Only Cretaceous formations exist, visible primarily in the eastern part of the state. The Dakota Formation is the oldest Cretaceous formation, deposited 100 million years ago (Ma) and containing a mix of sandstones, siltstones, mudstone and shale. In the early Cretaceous, Nebraska received up to 100 inches of rain a year because of high temperature conditions, at nearly three times the present rate of precipitation, carrying sediments through meandering rivers in a coastal plain and depositing them in the Western Interior Seaway.

Formations such as the Graneros Shale, Carlile Shale and Greehorn Limestone that extended at greater thickness into neighboring states such as Wyoming, record a period leading up to an 88 Ma erosional unconformity in which the Western Interior Seaway expanded leading to new deposition of limestone and shale. Between 88 and 80 million years ago (Ma), the Niobrara Formation formed, rich in chalk from marine plankton as well as shells and fish bones, tied to the same expansion of seas that left the earlier shales and limestone. The deepening of the seaway is marked by the youngest Cretaceous unit, the 2000 foot thick Pierre Shale, deposited from 80 to 70 million years ago (Ma) with a sequence of black and gray shales formed in a deep ocean environment interspersed with occasional bentonite (ashfall) deposits from ancient volcanic eruptions. Nebraska's current terrestrial in the center of North America has been continuous since the beginning of the Cenozoic. During the Paleocene and the Eocene, Nebraska experienced a warm, humid climate and gathered sediments shed from the uplifting Rocky Mountains. Miocene climate change brought cooler, drier temperatures to the region that continued into the Pliocene. With the onset of the Quaternary and Pleistocene glaciations, Nebraska remained free of ice sheets but experienced harsh climatic conditions typical of a polar desert or taiga, while continuing to receive sediments from further west. The arrival of humans in the Holocene began to alter the surficial geology and hydrogeology of Nebraska, particularly since the advent of statehood, with widespread agriculture.

== Surficial geology and soils ==
Sediment and soils make up much of the surficial geology of Nebraska and play an important role in the state's agricultural economy. A total of 138 soil series are known within the state, divided up into additional phases and types. Forty nine percent of the land surface is covered by 17 soil series.

== Hydrogeology and water resources ==
The Ogallala Aquifer is one of the world's largest aquifers spanning almost the entire state of Nebraska, except for a small section of the Nebraska Panhandle and areas in the east near the Missouri River. Nebraska hydrogeology is known through extensive irrigation well drilling for agriculture. In the early 1990s, a USGS study focused on Shelton, Nebraska and the Platte River found Holocene and Pleistocene sand and gravel deposits interbedded with clay and silt between 45 and 100 feet thick, overlying other Quaternary silt deposits between 10 and 64 feet thick. Beneath these layers was a thick deposit ranging between 10 and 145 feet thick of green sands, often cemented with calcium carbonate making up the Ogallala formation. The basement of the aquifer at the location is the Pierre Shale.

== Mining in Nebraska ==
Early settlers in Nebraska sought out coal seams throughout the state. A professor from the University of Nebraska attracted attention from local newspapers when he reported a 16-inch coal seam in Cass County in 1874. However, it was not a significant find.

The Cameco Resources Crow Butte uranium mine opened in 1991 in Crawford, Nebraska bringing 400 tons of uranium to the surface each year through 5,400 wells and remains operational.

== Oil and gas in Nebraska ==
Oil was first discovered in Richardson County in 1939. By 1990, the state was the 20th largest producer of oil and gas in the US, with three oil and gas producing regions and 93 counties with at least one test well. Between 1975 and 1990, the state produced six million barrels a year, with only 1–2% of the yield being natural gas. The former Sioux Ordnance Depot in Cheyenne County was the site of 70% of federal oil production from the Derrick, Table and Ehmke fields. Of the 2,817 active oil and gas wells in the state on January 1, 2016, the Nebraska Oil and Gas Conservation Commission found that only two used hydraulic fracturing.

== See also ==
- Paleontology in Nebraska
