= List of sedimentary formations in Belgium =

This is a list of all the sedimentary formation that are found in Belgium.

Name	Age
Aalter Formation	Eocene
Brussels Formation	Eocene
Gentbrugge Formation	Eocene
Hannut Formation	Late Paleocene
Heers Formation	Paleocene
Houthem Formation	Paleocene
Ieper Group	Eocene
Kortrijk Formation	Eocene
Landen Group	Late Paleocene to Early Eocene
Lede Formation	Eocene
Opglabbeek Formation	Paleocene
Rupel Group	Oligocene
Tienen Formation	Paleocene to Eocene
Tielt Formation	Eocene
Tongeren Group	Late Eocene to Early Oligocene
Voort Formation	Oligocene
Zenne Group	Eocene
