= List of fossiliferous stratigraphic units in Belgium =

Group or Formation	Period	Notes
Merksem Formation	Belgium	
Breda Formation	Neogene	
Berchem Formation	Neogene	
Diest Formation	Neogene	
Edegem Sands	Neogene	
Kallo Sands	Neogene	
Kasterlee Formation	Neogene	
Kattendijk Formation	Neogene	
Lillo Formation	Neogene	
Sables d'Anvers	Neogene	
Tielrode Formation	Neogene	
Wemmel Formation	Paleogene	
Aalter Formation	Paleogene	
Boom Formation	Paleogene	
Borgloon Formation	Paleogene	
Brussel Formation	Paleogene	
Brussels Formation	Paleogene	
Calcaire de Eisden	Paleogene	
Calcaire de Mons	Paleogene	
Hainin Formation	Paleogene	
Hannut Formation	Paleogene	
Heers Formation	Paleogene	
Houthem Formation	Paleogene	
Kortrijk Clay	Paleogene	
Landen Formation	Paleogene	
Lede Formation	Paleogene	
Neerrepen Sands	Paleogene	
Tienen Formation	Paleogene	
Tongeren Group/Borgloon Formation	Paleogene	
Tufeau de Ciply	Paleogene	
Poudingue de Ciply Formation	Paleogene	
Sables de Mons	Paleogene	
Aachen Formation	Cretaceous	
Bernissart Calcirudites	Cretaceous	
Ciply Phosphatic Chalk	Cretaceous	
Ciply Formation	Cretaceous	
Craie d'Obourg	Cretaceous	
Craie de Ciply	Cretaceous	
Craie de Maisieres	Cretaceous	
Craie de Nouvelles	Cretaceous	
Craie de Spiennes	Cretaceous	
Craie de Triviéres	Cretaceous	
Dieves et Fortes Toises Formation	Cretaceous	
Glauconie de Lonzée Formation	Cretaceous	
Gulpen Formation	Cretaceous	
Maastricht Formation	Cretaceous	
Marne Grise Formation	Cretaceous	
Meerssen Chalk	Cretaceous	
Nouvelles Chalk	Cretaceous	
Obourg Chalk Formation	Cretaceous	
Trivieres Chalk	Cretaceous	
Tuffeau de St. Symphorien	Cretaceous	
Vaals Formation	Cretaceous	
Wealden Group/Baudour Clays	Cretaceous	
Wealden Group/Sainte Formation	Cretaceous	
Saint Formation	Cretaceous	
Spiennes Chalk	Cretaceous	
St. Symphorien Gravel	Cretaceous	
Grès d'Orval	Jurassic	
Gréseux de Florenville	Jurassic	
Marne de Strassen	Jurassic	
Marne de Warcq	Jurassic	
Marnes de Jamoigne	Jurassic	
Messancy Formation	Jurassic	
Grès de Mortinsart	Triassic	
Sables de Mortinsart	Triassic	
Anhee Formation	Carboniferous	
Calcaire de Lives	Carboniferous	
Calcaire de Maredsous	Carboniferous	
Calcaire de Premier	Carboniferous	
Calcaire de Seilles	Carboniferous	
Carboniferous Limestone Formation	Carboniferous	
Flénu Formation	Carboniferous	
Lives Formation	Carboniferous	
Marbre Noir Formation	Carboniferous	
Tournai Formation	Carboniferous	
Waulsort Fazies Formation	Carboniferous	
Acoz Formation	Devonian	
Aisemont Formation	Devonian	
Alvana limeshales Formation	Devonian	
Assise de Frasnes Formation	Devonian	
Assise de Winenne Formation	Devonian	
Barvaux Formation	Devonian	
Bois d'Ausse Sandstone Formation	Devonian	
Bois de Bordeaux Formation	Devonian	
Bois Formation	Devonian	
Burnotien Formation	Devonian	
Chemung Formation	Devonian	
Claminforge Formation	Devonian	
Evieux Formation	Devonian	
Famenne Formation	Devonian	
Famenne Group/Senzeille Formation	Devonian	
Franc Waret Formation	Devonian	
Fromelennes Formation	Devonian	
Grands Breux Formation	Devonian	
Gres et schists de Wepion	Devonian	
Grès d'Acoz	Devonian	
Grès de Wepion	Devonian	
Grès de Wiheries	Devonian	
Grès du Bois d'Ausse	Devonian	
Hanonet Formation	Devonian	
Hodimont Formation	Devonian	
Jemelle Formation	Devonian	
Lambermont Formation	Devonian	
Le Roux Formation	Devonian	
Leroux Formation	Devonian	
Les Valisettes Formation	Devonian	
Lustin Formation	Devonian	
Moulin Liénaux Formation	Devonian	
Neuville Formation	Devonian	
Nèvremont Formation	Devonian	
Névremont Formation	Devonian	
Pepinster Formation	Devonian	
Presles Formation	Devonian	
Rivière Formation	Devonian	
Rouillon Formation	Devonian	
Souverain Formation	Devonian	
Trois Formation	Devonian	
Trois Fontaines Formation	Devonian	

== See also ==
- Lists of fossiliferous stratigraphic units in Europe
  - List of fossiliferous stratigraphic units in France
  - List of fossiliferous stratigraphic units in Germany
  - List of fossiliferous stratigraphic units in Luxembourg
  - List of fossiliferous stratigraphic units in the Netherlands
