= List of stratigraphic units in the Netherlands =

This is a list of all the stratigraphic units that are found in the Netherlands.

Name	Image
Aachen Formation	
Aalburg Formation	
Appelscha Formation	
Beegden Formation	
Boxtel Formation	
Brabant Formation	
Breda Formation	
Breeveertien Formation	
Coevorden Formation	
Dongen Formation	
Drente Formation	
Echteld Formation	
Eem Formation	
Ekofisk Formation	Offshore only
Formatie van Kreftenheye	
Formatie van Maassluis	
Formatie van Naaldwijk	
Formatie van Nieuwkoop	
Formatie van Peize	
Formatie van Sterksel	
Formatie van Stramproy	
Formatie van Urk	
Formatie van Waalre	
Friese Front Formation	
Gulpen Formation	
Holland Formation	
Inden Formation	
Kieseloölite Formation	
Landen Formation	
Lower Buntsandstein Formation	
Lower Germanic Triassic Group	
Lower Graben Formation	
Maastricht Formation	
Middle Graben Formation	
Middle North Sea Group	
Nedersaksen Group	
Nieuwerkerk Formation	
Ommelanden Formation	
Oosterhout Formation	
Puzzle Hole Formation	
Rijnland Group	
Rupel Formation	
Scheemda Formation	
Scruff Greensand Formation	
Sleen Formation	
Slochteren Formation	
Texel Formation	
Tongeren Formation	
Upper Germanic Triassic Group	
Upper Graben Formation	
Vaals Formation	
Veldhoven Formation	
Ville Formation	
Vlieland Claystone Formation	
Vlieland Sandstone Formation	
Weiteveen Formation	
Werkendam Formation	
Zechstein	
Zurich Formation	
