= List of fossiliferous stratigraphic units in the Netherlands =

Group or Formation	Period	Notes
Aachen Formation	Cretaceous	
Aachenian Formation	Cretaceous	
Breda Formation	Neogene	
Calcaire de Kunraed Formation	Cretaceous	
Grebbeberg Formation	Netherlands	
Gulpen Formation	Cretaceous	
Houthem Formation	Netherlands	
IJmuiden Ground Formation	Netherlands	
Kunrade Formation	Cretaceous	
Kunrade Chalk Formation	Cretaceous	
Kunrade Chalke Formation	Cretaceous	
Landen Formation	Paleogene	
Lower Gulpen Chalk Formation	Cretaceous	
Maastricht Formation	Paleogene, Cretaceous	
Maastricht Chalk Formation	Cretaceous	
Maastrichter Tuffkreide Formation	Cretaceous	
Muschelkalk Group/Vossenveld Formation	Triassic	
Nekum Formation	Cretaceous	
Oosterhout Formation	Neogene	
Tienen Formation	Paleogene	
Upper Gulpen Chalk Formation	Cretaceous	
Urk Formation	Netherlands	
Vaals Formation	Cretaceous	
Vaals Greensand Formation	Cretaceous	
Vossenveld Formation	Triassic	
Westkapelle Ground Formation	Neogene	

== See also ==
- Lists of fossiliferous stratigraphic units in Europe
