= Tongeren Formation =

The Tongeren Formation (Dutch: Formatie van Tongeren; abbreviation: TO) is a geologic formation in the subsurface of the Netherlands. The formation consists of shallow marine, epicontinental and continental sediments, predominantly clay and sand from the late Eocene and early Oligocene epochs (between 37 and 30 million years old). The Tongeren Formation is part of the Middle North Sea Group and correlates with the Tongeren Group from Belgian stratigraphy.

The name was introduced by Belgian geologist André Hubert Dumont in 1849.

== Lithologies and subdivision ==
The Tongeren Formation is subdivided into three members:

- the Goudsberg Member, an alternation of clay with chert nodules and thin lignite layers;
- the Klimmen Member, micaceous fine sand; and
- the Zelzate Member, shallow marine glauconiferous sand alternating with clay layers.

== Stratigraphic position ==
In southern Limburg the Tongeren Formation is lies on top of formations of the Lower North Sea Group (in particular the late Paleocene to early Eocene Dongen Formation and Landen Formation) or the Dutch Chalk Group (represented by the Late Cretaceous to early Paleocene Vaals Formation, Gulpen Formation and Houthem Formation).

In most places, the late Oligocene, marine sands and clays of the Rupel Formation are found on top of the Tongeren Formation.
