= Hesbaye Group =

The Hesbaye Group is a stratigraphic group (a set of sedimentary layers) in the subsurface of northeastern Belgium. This group was deposited during the early Paleocene epoch and is subdivided into two formations: the Houthem Formation (lower) and the Opglabbeek Formation (upper). The group is named after the region of Hesbaye in the south of Limburg.

The Houthem Formation consists of shallow marine sandy limestones of early to middle Danian age (about 65-63 million years old). It is found in the province of Limburg and the north of the province of Antwerp. This formation also occurs in the Netherlands, where it is considered part of the Chalk Group. The Opglabbeek Formation is an alternation of continental to lagunary clay, sand and lignite layers of early Selandian age (about 60 million years old). This formation only occurs in the north and east of the province of Limburg. Corresponding deposits in the Netherlands are divided with the Landen Formation.

The Hesbaye Group lies stratigraphically on top of older, Cretaceous formations, such as the Maastricht Formation (sandy limestone). The late Paleocene Hannut Formation (marine clays, sands and limestones) is normally lying stratigraphically on top of the Hesbaye Group.
