= Tielt Formation =

Geologic formation in Belgium

- Stratigraphic range: Ypresian; ~53 Ma
- Type: Geological formation
- Unit of: Ieper Group
- Sub-units: Egemkapel & Kortemark Members
- Underlies: Hyon Formation
- Overlies: Kortrijk Formation
- Thickness: up to 25 m (82 ft)

Lithology
- Primary: Sandstone

Location
- Region: Hainaut, West-, East Flanders, Flemish & Walloon Brabant
- Country: Belgium
- Extent: Campine Basin

Type section
- Named for: Tielt
- Region: West Flanders

The Tielt Formation (Dutch: Formatie van Tielt; French: Formation de Tielt; abbreviation: Tt; named after the town of Tielt in West Flanders) is a geologic formation in the subsurface of Belgium. The formation crops out in the north of Hainaut, in the southern and central parts of West- and East Flanders and in Walloon and Flemish Brabant. It consists of marine very fine sand and silt, deposited in the shallow sea that covered Belgium during the middle and late Ypresian age (early Eocene, about 53 million years ago).

== Description ==
The Tielt Formation is 25 m (82 ft) thick at most. It is subdivided into two members: the Kortemark and Egemkapel Members. The formation lies stratigraphically on top of the Kortrijk Formation (early Ypresian sandy clay and silt). In the northwestern part of Belgium, the Gentbrugge Formation (late Ypresian marine clay and silt) covers the Tielt Formation. If the Gentbrugge Formation is absent, the younger Brussels Formation (Lutetian calcareous sand) is directly found on top of the Tielt Formation.

== Fossil content ==
=== Chondrichthyes ===
Chondrichthyes reported from the Tielt Formation
| Genus | Species | Location | Stratigraphic position | Material | Notes | Images |
|---|---|---|---|---|---|---|
| Urobatis | U. molleni | | Kortemark Silt & Egem members. | Numerous teeth. | A round ray also known from the Aalter & Brussels Sand formations. | |

=== Crustaceans ===
Crustaceans reported from the Tielt Formation
| Genus | Species | Location | Stratigraphic position | Material | Notes | Images |
|---|---|---|---|---|---|---|
| Loerenthopluma | L. danielae | Ampe sand & clay pit near Egem. | Egemkapel Clay Member. | A dozen well-preserved specimens. | A retroplumid crab. | |
| Upogebia | U. lambrechtsi | Ampe sand & clay pit, Egem. | Egemkapel Clay Member. | Over 100 specimens. | An upogebiid mud shrimp. | |

== See also ==
- List of fossiliferous stratigraphic units in Belgium
- Ypresian formations
  - Fur Formation of Denmark
  - London Clay Formation of England
  - Silveirinha Formation of Portugal
- Wasatchian formations
  - Nanjemoy Formation of the eastern United States
  - Wasatch Formation of the western United States
- Itaboraian formations
  - Itaboraí Formation of Brazil
  - Laguna del Hunco Formation of Argentina
