= Gentbrugge Formation =

Belgian geologic formation

- Stratigraphic range: Ypresian; ~50 Ma
- Type: Geological formation
- Unit of: Ieper Group
- Sub-units: Egemkapel & Kortemark Members
- Underlies: Aalter & Brussels Formations
- Overlies: Mons-en-Pévèle Formation
- Thickness: up to 50 m (160 ft)

Lithology
- Primary: Sandstone, siltstone
- Other: Claystone

Location
- Region: West Flanders, East Flanders, & Antwerp
- Country: Belgium
- Extent: Campine Basin

Type section
- Named for: Gentbrugge
- Region: East Flanders

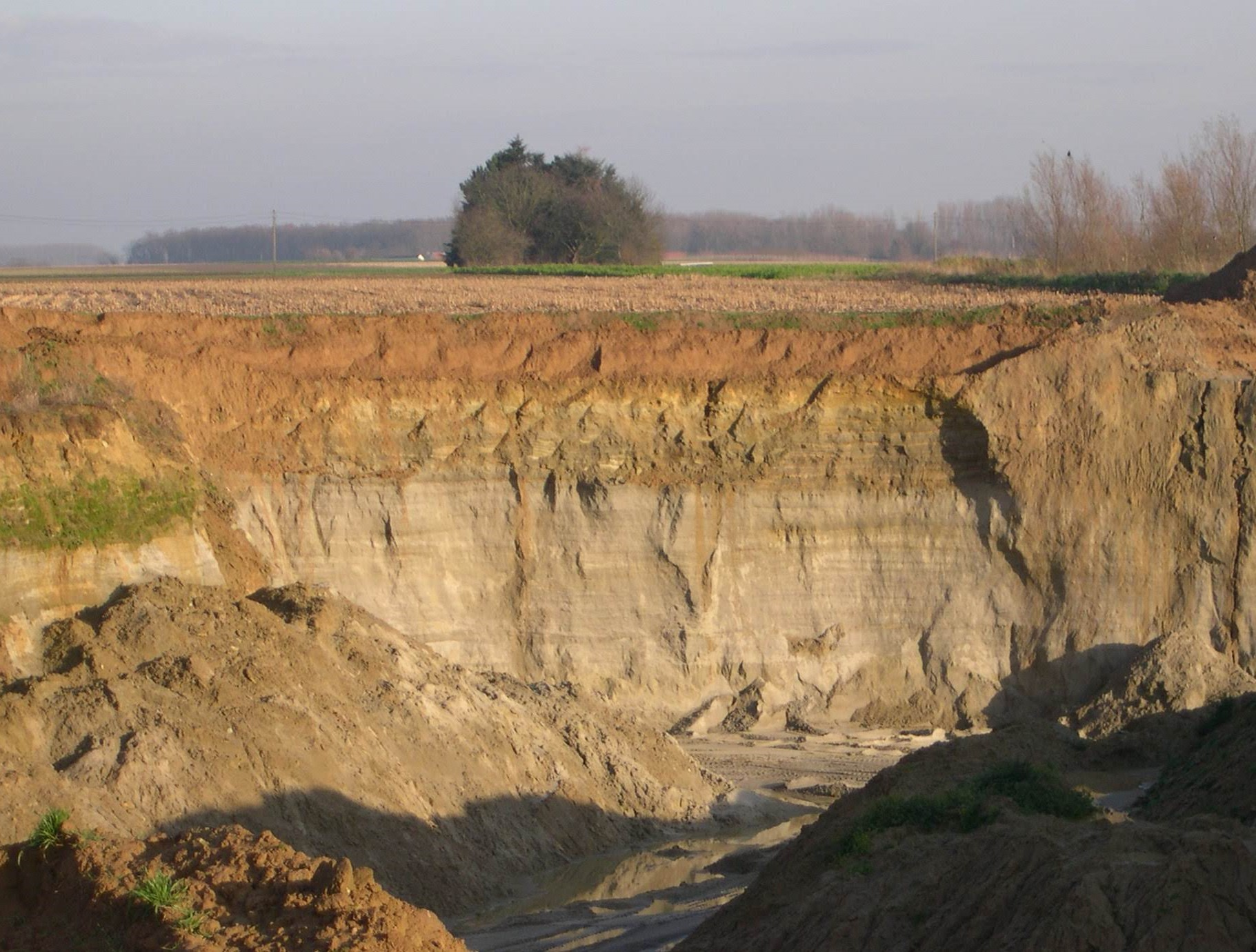
Quaternary loam (orange) above the Gentbrugge Formation (yellow-green) above the Tielt Formation (grey-white), exposed in a quarry at Gavere, Belgium.

The Gentbrugge Formation (Dutch: Formatie van Gentbrugge, abbreviation: Ge; named after the town of Gentbrugge in East Flanders) is a geologic formation in the west of Belgium. The formation crops out in East Flanders and West Flanders and also occurs in the subsurface of the Province of Antwerp. It consists of marine clay, silt and sand, deposited in the shallow sea that covered northern Belgium during the Ypresian age (around 50 million years ago, part of the early Eocene).

== Description ==
The Gentbrugge Formation reaches its greatest thickness in the north of Belgium, where it can be maximally 50 metres (160 ft) thick. It is subdivided into three members. The base of the formation is formed by silty clay and clayey silt (Merelbeke Member). On top of this are laminae of silt (Pittem Member) and beds of very fine sand, disturbed by bioturbation (Vlierzele Member). The sands can have horizontal bedding as well as cross bedding, and are often lithified into sandstone.

=== Stratigraphy ===
The Gentbrugge Formation is part of the Ieper Group and is stratigraphically on top of the older Mons-en-Pévèle Formation (micaceous sandstone), another formation of the same group. On top of the Gentbrugge Formation are deposits of the Lutetian Zenne Group. In the north of Belgium this is often the Aalter Formation (marine clays and sands). In the south the Aalter Formation often lacks and the younger Brussels Formation (marine sand and marl) and Lede Formation (marine calcareous sand) can be found directly on top of the Gentbrugge Formation.

== See also ==
- List of fossiliferous stratigraphic units in Belgium
- Ypresian formations
  - Fur Formation of Denmark
  - London Clay Formation of England
  - Silveirinha Formation of Portugal
- Wasatchian formations
  - Nanjemoy Formation of the eastern United States
  - Wasatch Formation of the western United States
- Itaboraian formations
  - Itaboraí Formation of Brazil
  - Laguna del Hunco Formation of Argentina
