= Lower North Sea Group =

Group of geologic formations

Formations, members and layers after NITG-TNO
marine
Dongen Formation DO	Asse Member DOAS
Dongen Formation DO	Brussel Member DOBR
Dongen Formation DO	Ieper Member DOIE
Dongen Formation DO	Oosteind Member DOOO	Basal Dongen Tuffite DOOOBT
Landen Formation LA	Gelinden Member LAGE
Landen Formation LA	Liessel Member LALI
Landen Formation LA	Orp Member LAOR
Landen Formation LA	Reusel Member LARE
Landen Formation LA	Swalmen Member LASW

The Lower North Sea Group (abbreviation: NL) is a group of geologic formations in the subsurface of the Netherlands and adjacent parts of the North Sea.

The group is part of the North Sea Supergroup and consists of two marine formations of early Paleogene age, the older Landen Formation and younger Dongen Formation. It is in most places stratigraphically on top of the Late Cretaceous Chalk Group and overlain by the late Paleogene Middle North Sea Group.

The Lower North Sea Group crops out in a few spots in the south of the Netherlands but is mostly overlain by younger deposits. It can be found in the subsurface of most of the Netherlands.
