= Nicolia =

The genus name Nicolia may refer to:

- Nicolia Gibson-Smith & Gibson-Smith, 1979, a synonym for Arcinella Schumacher, 1817, a genus of bivalves
- Nicolia Gregorio, 1880, an extinct genus of gastropods
- Nicolia Unger, a genus of fossilized wood
