= Kortrijk Formation =

Geologic formation in Belgium

- Stratigraphic range: Ypresian; ~54 Ma
- Type: Geological formation
- Unit of: Ieper Group
- Sub-units: Mont Héribu Member; Orchies or Saint-Maur Member; Moen or Roubaix Member; Aalbeke Member
- Underlies: Tielt Formation
- Overlies: Landen Group; Tienen & Hannut Formations
- Thickness: up to 125 m (410 ft)

Lithology
- Primary: Marine claystone

Location
- Region: Hainaut, West Flanders, East Flanders & Walloon Brabant
- Country: Belgium
- Extent: Campine Basin

Type section
- Named for: Kortrijk
- Region: West Flanders

The Kortrijk Formation (Dutch: Formatie van Kortrijk; French: Formation de Courtrai; abbreviation: Ko; named after the West Flemish city of Kortrijk) is a geologic formation in the Belgian subsurface. This formation crops out in northern Hainaut, southern West and East Flanders and in Walloon Brabant. The formation consists of marine clay from the Ypresian age (early Eocene, about 54 million years old).

== Description ==
The Kortrijk Formation consists predominantly of clay, sometimes sandy or silty. The formation generally becomes sandier to the east, in Brabant and the Campine area. In some places fossils or bioturbation occur. In the westernmost part of Belgium it can be 125 metres (410 ft) thick, but it gradually wedges out to the east.

=== Subdivision ===
The Kortrijk Formation is subdivided into at least four members: the Mont Héribou, Orchies or Saint-Maur, Moen or Roubaix and the Aalbeke Member. The Kortrijk Formation forms the lowest part of the Ieper Group and is stratigraphically overlain by the younger Tielt Formation (late Ypresian marine sand), part of the same group. The Kortrijk Formation lies on top of late Paleocene formations like the Tienen Formation or Hannut Formation, both part of the Landen Group.

== See also ==
- List of fossiliferous stratigraphic units in Belgium
- Ypresian formations
  - Fur Formation of Denmark
  - London Clay Formation of England
  - Silveirinha Formation of Portugal
- Wasatchian formations
  - Nanjemoy Formation of the eastern United States
  - Wasatch Formation of the western United States
- Itaboraian formations
  - Itaboraí Formation of Brazil
  - Laguna del Hunco Formation of Argentina
