= Dongen Formation =

Geologic formation in the Netherlands

The Dongen Formation (Dutch: Formatie van Dongen; abbreviation: DO) is a geologic formation in the subsurface of the Netherlands. The formation consists of early Eocene marine clay and sand. It is named after the town of Dongen in North Brabant.

== Lithology and stratigraphy ==
The Dongen Formation consists predominantly of marine clay, alternated with layers of fine sand or glauconiferous marl. The clay can also contain glauconite and locally thin layers of tuffite or loam can occur.

The formation is subdivided into four members:

- the Asse Member, clay with locally sandy layers, glauconite or/and nummulites;
- the Brussels Member, fine glauconiferous sand, locally calcareous;
- the Ieper Member, clay with layers of marl and limestone;
- the Oosteind Member, clay with sand and tuffite layers.

The base of the formation is often formed by a tuffite layer.

The Dutch Dongen Formation correlates with the Belgian Ieper Group and Zenne Group. All of these units are marine sands and clay cats from the Ypresian (55.8 - 48.6 million years ago) and Lutetian (48.6 - 40.4 million years ago) ages, when the eustatic sea level was relatively high after the Paleocene–Eocene Thermal Maximum. The sea level was so high that the North Sea was connected with the Paris Basin to the south and all of the Netherlands and most of Belgium and northern France was covered by shallow seas.

Dutch stratigraphers put the Dongen Formation together with the older Landen Formation in the Lower North Sea Group. The top of the Dongen Formation is formed by a nonconformity, over which younger formations, such as the Oligocene Rupel Formation or the Miocene Breda Formation, are found.
