= Gerard Smets =

Belgian geologist, paleontologist, and scientist

- Born: 1857
- Died: 1922 (aged 64–65); Moresnet, Belgium
- Education: Collège Saint-Joseph, Hasselt
- Years active: 1880s – 1904
- Known for: geology paleontology science The misidentification of the plant genus Aachenosaurus

Gerard Smets, also spelt as Gérard Smets, (1857 – 1922) was a Belgian paleontologist, scientist, and abbé known for the misidentification of the plant genus Aachenosaurus (now known as Nicolia moresneti), named after the locale of Aachen.

== Biography ==
Gerard Smets was born in 1857 and he worked at the Collège Saint-Joseph in Hasselt during the late 19th century.

He began to excavate the Aachen Formation at Moresnet during the 1880s, and during the time he named Aachenosaurus in 1888, a rumor abounded that he completely withdrew from science out of pure embarrassment after 1888, but not until he had published Les classifications des chéloniens in 1889; this rumour was later proven false.

Smets published La Culture Du Pin Sylvestre En Campine in 1892, and the last paper he published was La nutrition des plantes cultivées in 1904.

Smets died in 1922 at the village of Moresnet, Belgium.

== History of the Aachenosaurus ==
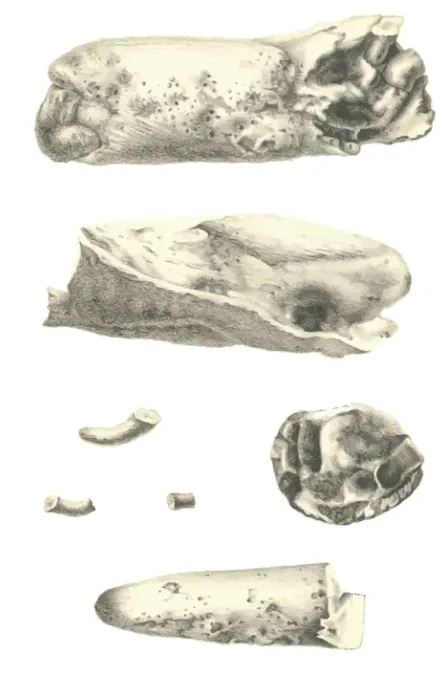
The Aachenosaurus specimen.

Aachenosaurus was discovered by Smets in 1887 and it consisted of several fragments of fossilised wood found in the Aachen Formation; he named the species Aachenosaurus multidens, now known as Nicolia moresneti, on 31 October 1888.

Based on these fragments he determined that the specimen was a hadrosaur reaching an estimated 4-5 meters in length which might have had dermal spines. He defended this conclusion, citing that the fossils had been examined visually with the naked eye, magnifying lenses and with the microscope. However, his error was soon demonstrated by Louis Dollo. Smets at first tried to defend his original identification but was again proven wrong by a neutral commission.
