= Rupel Group =

Geologic formations in Belgium

The Rupel Group is a stratigraphic group of rock strata in the subsurface of Belgium. It is subdivided into three formations that are all marine deposits (sands and clays) of Oligocene age.

== Name ==
The Rupel Group was first named by Belgian geologist André Hubert Dumont in 1849. It shares its name with the Rupelian age (34 to 28 million years ago) of the geological timescale. Both group and age are named after the Belgian river Rupel. The Rupel Group corresponds with the Rupel Formation in the Netherlands.

== Facies and lithologies ==
The Rupel Group can be 250 meters thick at maximum. During the Rupelian age Belgium was covered by a shallow sea. The formations of the Rupel Group therefore have a shallow marine to near coastal facies.

== Stratigraphy ==
The group is subdivided into three formations: the Bilzen Formation (yellow-white glauconiferous fine sand, containing fossils), the Boom Formation (a thick clay deposit, containing loam layers and septaria) and the Eigenbilzen Formation (strongly layered sands).

The Rupel Group lies stratigraphically on top of the late Eocene Tongeren Group (Sint Huibrechts-Hern Formation or Zelzate Formation) or Maldegem Formation. The group can be covered by a range of younger formations, such as the late Oligocene Voort Formation, the Miocene Berchem Formation or Bolderberg Formation or the Pliocene Kattendijk Formation.
