= Inner Hebrides Group =

Group of geological formations

- Stratigraphic range: Cenomanian to Paleocene
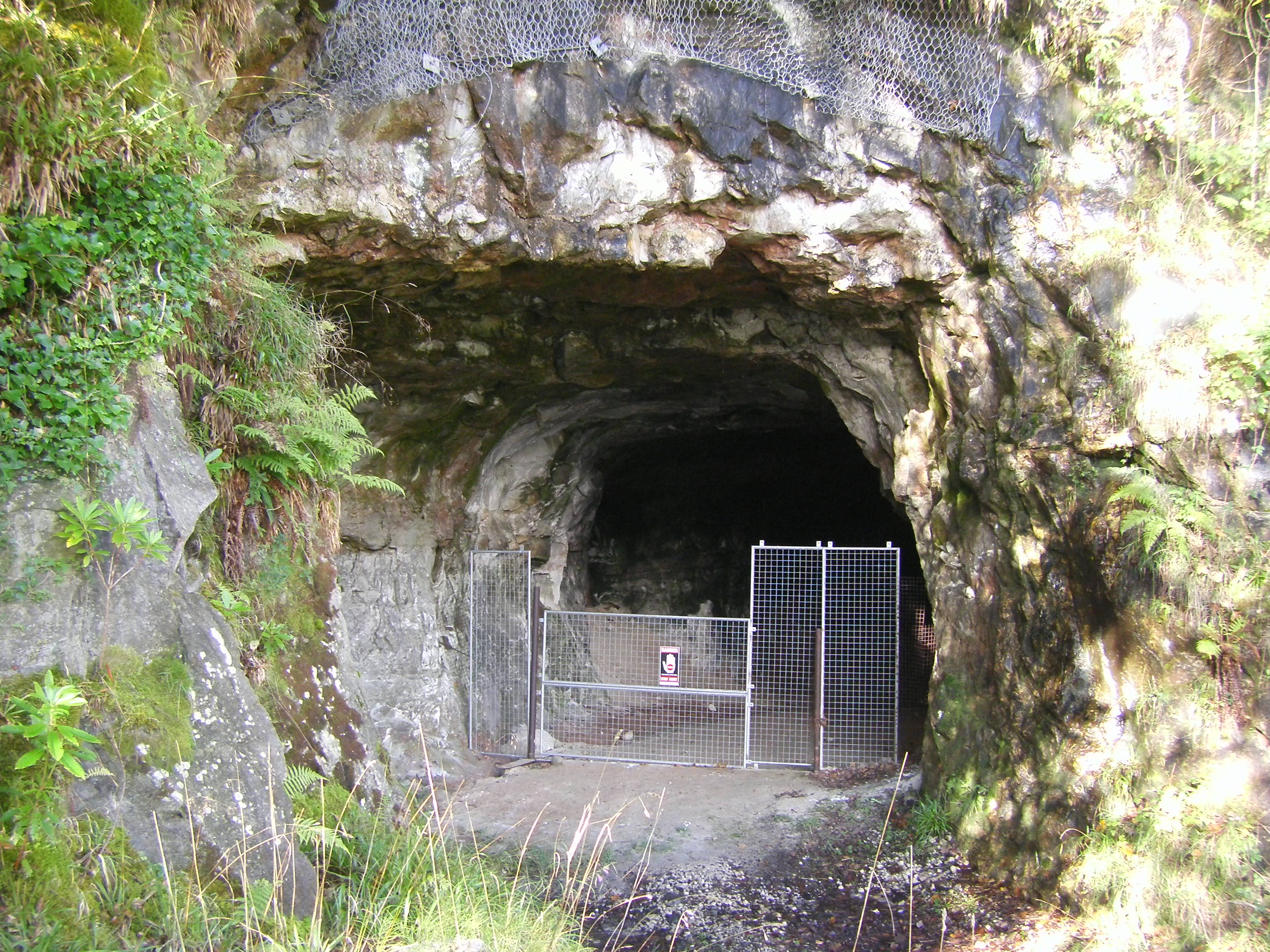
- Entrance to silica sand mine in Lochaline White Sandstone Formation
- Type: Group
- Sub-units: Morvern Greensand Formation, Lochaline White Sandstone Formation, Coire Riabhach Phosphatic Formation, Griburn Chalk Formation, Feorlin Sandstone Formation, Strathaird Limestone Formation, Beinn Iadain Mudstone Formation
- Underlies: Paleocene lavas
- Overlies: unconformable
- Thickness: 10-22m

Lithology
- Primary: sandstones
- Other: mudstones, limestones

Location
- Region: Inner Hebrides
- Country: United Kingdom
- Extent: Mull, Eigg, Skye, Scalpay, Soay, Raasay and the Morvern peninsula

In geology, the Inner Hebrides Group is a lithostratigraphical division containing a range of rocks mainly of Late Cretaceous age which occur around the west coast of the Scottish Highlands. It comprises the following formations:

- Beinn Iadain Mudstone Formation
- Strathaird Limestone Formation
- Feorlin Sandstone Formation
- Griburn Chalk Formation
- Coire Riabhach Phosphatic Formation
- Lochaline White Sandstone Formation
- Morvern Greensand Formation

The Clach Alasdair Conglomerate Member and the Laig Gorge Sandstone & Limestone Members are rock units below formation level, assigned to the Strathaird Limestone Formation.

Each of these formations is of limited geographical extent, the Scottish Chalk Province being fragmented amongst the islands of Skye, Eigg and Mull and the adjacent Scottish mainland district of Morvern. Each of the rock units has gone by different names in the past - the succession outlined here is based on an interpretation by the British Geological Survey reflecting more recent survey and age analysis. It is likely that the youngest of these formations, the Beinn Iadain Mudstone Formation, is largely of Paleogene age. The Group as a whole is the age equivalent of the Chalk Group of southern England.
