= Brussels Formation =

Geologic formation in Belgium

The Brussels Formation (Dutch: Formatie van Brussel; French: Formation de Bruxelles; abbreviation: Br) is a geologic formation in the subsurface of central Belgium. The formation is named after the Belgian capital, Brussels. It consists of shallow marine sandstone and calcareous sands, deposited in the sea that covered Belgium 45 million years ago, in the Eocene.

The Brussels Formation crops out in Walloon Brabant and the north of the provinces of Namur and Hainaut. It is normally about 30 metres in thickness. In Flemish Brabant and Antwerp the formation can be found in the subsurface.

The Brussels Formation is subdivided into five members: the Archennes Member (conglomerates), the Bois de la Houssière Member (quartzites), the Chaumont-Gistoux Member (glauconiferous quartzites), the Diegem Member (glauconiferous quartzite) and the Neerijse Member (glauconiferous calcareous sand). The formation consists either of cross-bedded non-calcareous sands alternating with thin beds of marl and clay or calcareous fine sands with traces of bioturbation.

The formation was formed during the early Lutetian age (about 46 million years ago) and is part of the Zenne Group. Stratigraphically on top of the Brussels Formation is the Lede Formation (also part of the Zenne Group), or when this formation is absent the Maldegem Formation (Bartonian) or Tongeren Group (Priabonian to Rupelian). The Brussels Formation is normally lying stratigraphically on top of the Aalter Formation (part of the Zenne Group) or deposits of the Ieper Group.

== See also ==
- List of sedimentary formations in Belgium
