= Hibernian Greensands Group =

Late Cretaceous lithostratigraphic group in Northern Ireland

- Stratigraphic range: Cenomanian–Santonian
- Type: Group
- Sub-units: Kilcoan Sands, Collinwell Sands, Island Magee Siltstones, Belfast Marls
- Underlies: Ulster White Limestone Group
- Overlies: Unconformity
- Thickness: 21–22 m (69–72 ft)

Lithology
- Primary: Marl
- Other: Siltstone, sandstone

Location
- Region: Northern Ireland
- Country: United Kingdom
- Extent: throughout Northern Ireland

The Hibernian Greensands Group is a late Cretaceous lithostratigraphic group (a sequence of rock strata) in Northern Ireland. It is Cenomanian to Santonian in age. The name is derived from the characteristically coloured marls and sandstones which occur beneath the chalk particularly along the Antrim coast. The strata are exposed on or near to both the northern and eastern coasts of Antrim and also between Portrush and Dungiven within County Londonderry. Further outcrops occur between Belfast and Lurgan and between Dungannon and Magherafelt. It unconformably overlies a variety of units from the Metamorphic Precambrian Southern Highland Group to the Lower Jurassic Lias. The current names replace an earlier situation where the present group was considered to be a formation and each of the present formations was considered a 'member'. Several other stratigraphic naming schemes were in use during the nineteenth century and much of the twentieth century. Various units were earlier referred to as glauconitic or chloritic marls. This group and the overlying Ulster White Limestone Group are the stratigraphical equivalent of the Chalk Group of southern and eastern England.

== Stratigraphy ==
- Kilcoan Sands Formation
- Collinwell Sands Formation
- Island Magee Siltstones Formation
- Belfast Marls Formation

There are unconformities (non-sequences) above and below the Collinwell Sands Formation.
