= Ulster White Limestone Group =

Rock strata group found in Northern Ireland

- Stratigraphic range: Santonian–Maastrichtian
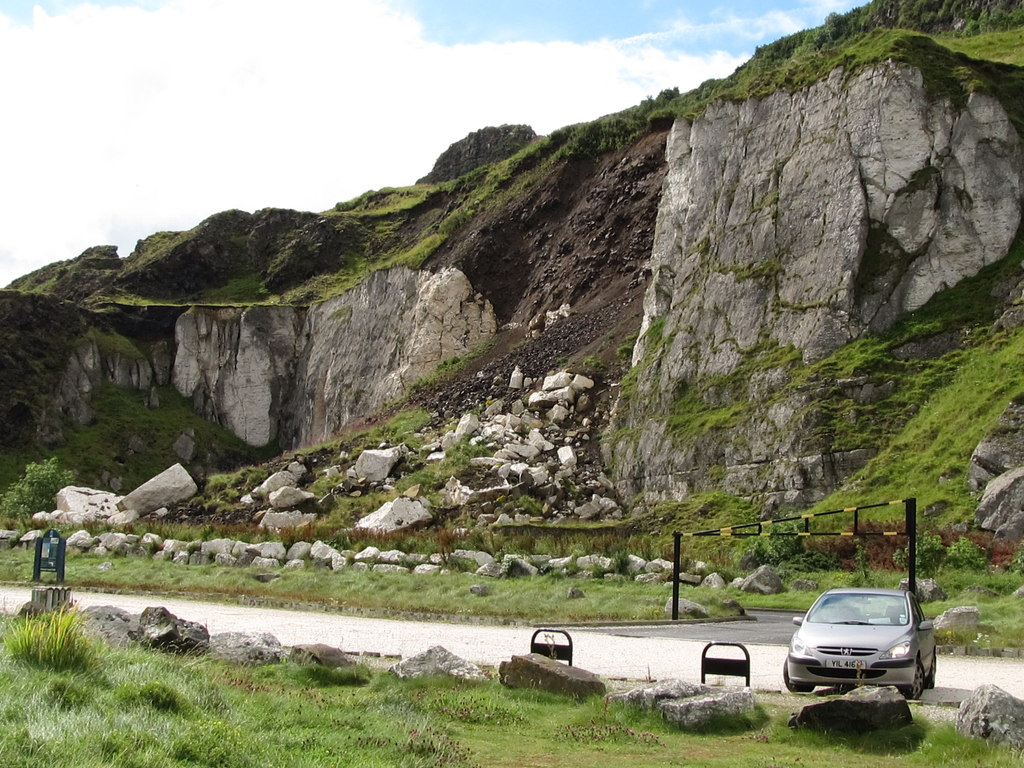
- Chalk cliff east of Glenarm on the Antrim coast
- Type: Group
- Sub-units: Post Larry Bane Chalk Subgroup, Pre-Larry Bane Chalk Subgroup
- Underlies: Palaeogene basalts (Antrim Lava Group) / Quaternary deposits
- Overlies: Hibernian Greensands Group
- Thickness: Highly variable dependent on the basin, up to 120 m in composite

Lithology
- Primary: limestones
- Other: flint, marl, conglomerates

Location
- Region: Northern Ireland
- Country: United Kingdom
- Extent: throughout Northern Ireland

The Ulster White Limestone Group is a late Cretaceous lithostratigraphic group (a sequence of rock strata) in Northern Ireland. The name is derived from the characteristic chalk rock which occurs particularly along the Antrim coast. The strata are exposed on or near to both the northern and eastern coasts of Antrim and also between Portrush and Dungiven within County Londonderry. Further outcrops occur between Belfast and Lurgan and between Dungannon and Magherafelt. The current names replace an earlier situation where the present group was considered to be a formation and each of the present formations was considered a 'member'. Several other stratigraphic naming schemes were in use during the nineteenth century and much of the twentieth century. This group and the underlying Hibernian Greensands Group are the stratigraphical equivalent of the Chalk Group of southern and eastern England.

== Stratigraphy ==
- Post-Larry Bane Chalk Subgroup
  - Ballycastle Chalk Formation
  - Port Calliagh Chalk Formation
  - Tanderagee Chalk Formation
  - Ballymagarry Chalk Formation
  - Portush Chalk Formation
  - Garron Chalk Formation
  - Glenarm Chalk Formation
  - Ballintoy Chalk Formation
- Larry Bane Chalk Formation
- Pre-Larry Bane Chalk Subgroup
  - Boheeshane Chalk Formation
  - Greggan Chalk Formation
  - Cloghastucan Chalk Formation
  - Galboly Chalk Formation
  - Clogfin Sponge Formation

There is an unconformity (non-sequence) at the base of the Boheeshane Chalk Formation.
