= Voort Formation =

Geologic formation in the Netherlands and Belgium

The Voort Formation or Voort Member (Dutch: Formatie van Voort or Laagpakket van Voort; abbreviation in Belgium: Vo or in the Netherlands: VEVO) is a stratigraphic unit in the subsurface of north Belgium and the south of the Netherlands. The unit has the status of a formation in Belgium but is seen as a member of the Veldhoven Formation in the Netherlands. The Voort Formation consists of shallow marine sands with a late Oligocene age (Chattian stage, about 25 million years old).

== Stratigraphy ==
In Belgian lithostratigraphy the Voort Formation is part of the Rupel Group, though other formations in this group are slightly older (of the early Oligocene Rupelian stage). In the Netherlands the Voort Member is part of the Veldhoven Formation. In Belgium, a clayey subunit is treated as a member of the Voort Formation (Veldhoven Member). In Dutch lithostratigraphy, this unit is classified as another member of the Veldhoven Formation and called the Wintelre Member.

In Belgium the Voort Formation is stratigraphically below the early Miocene marine Berchem Formation (in province of Antwerp) or Bolderberg Formation (in Limburg). In the Netherlands it is below the early Miocene Breda Formation.

In Belgium the Voort Formation is on top of the older formations of the Rupel Group (Boom Formation or Eigenbilzen Formation), in the Netherlands the Voort Member is on top of the Rupel Formation.

== Lithology ==
The Voort Formation consists of a 60 meters thick layer of greyish to greenish micaceous and glauconiferous fine sand. This is alternated by greenish sandy clay. crags or pyrite rich clay layers can occur locally. In the Roer Valley Graben the formation can be up to 300 meter in thickness.
