= Middle North Sea Group =

Group of geologic formations in the Dutch subsurface

Groups, formations, members and layers after NITG-TNO
Marine
Veldhoven Formation VE	Someren Member VESO
Veldhoven Formation VE	Voort Member VEVO
Veldhoven Formation VE	Wintelre Member VEWI
Rupel Formation RU	Bilzen Member RUBI	Berg Member RUBIBE
Rupel Formation RU	Bilzen Member RUBI	Kerniel Member RUBIKE
Rupel Formation RU	Bilzen Member RUBI	Kleine Spouwen Member RUBIKS
Rupel Formation RU	Boom Member RUBO	Brinkheurne Member RUBOBR
Rupel Formation RU	Boom Member RUBO	Winterswijk Member RUBOWI
Rupel Formation RU	Eigenbilzen Member RUEB
Rupel Formation RU	Ratum Member RURA	Ootmarsum Member RURAOO
Tongeren Formation TO	Goudsberg Member TOGO
Tongeren Formation TO	Klimmen Member TOKL
Tongeren Formation TO	Zelzate Member TOZE	Bassevelde Member TOZEBA
Tongeren Formation TO	Zelzate Member TOZE	Ruisbroek Member TOZERU
Tongeren Formation TO	Zelzate Member TOZE	Watervliet Member TOZEWA

The Middle North Sea Group (abbreviation: NM) is a group of geologic formations in the Dutch subsurface, part of the North Sea Supergroup. The three formations of this group form a thick sequence of sediments in the Dutch subsurface, they crop out in parts of the southern Netherlands. The Middle North Sea Group was deposited from the late Eocene to late Oligocene, between 37 and 23 million years ago.

Its three formations are (from old to young) the Tongeren, Rupel and Veldhoven Formations. The Tongeren Formation has a continental to paralic facies, the other two consist mainly of shallow marine clays and sands.
