= Aachen Formation =

Upper Cretaceous geologic formation

- Stratigraphic range: Santonian-Campanian; ~86.3–83.6 Ma
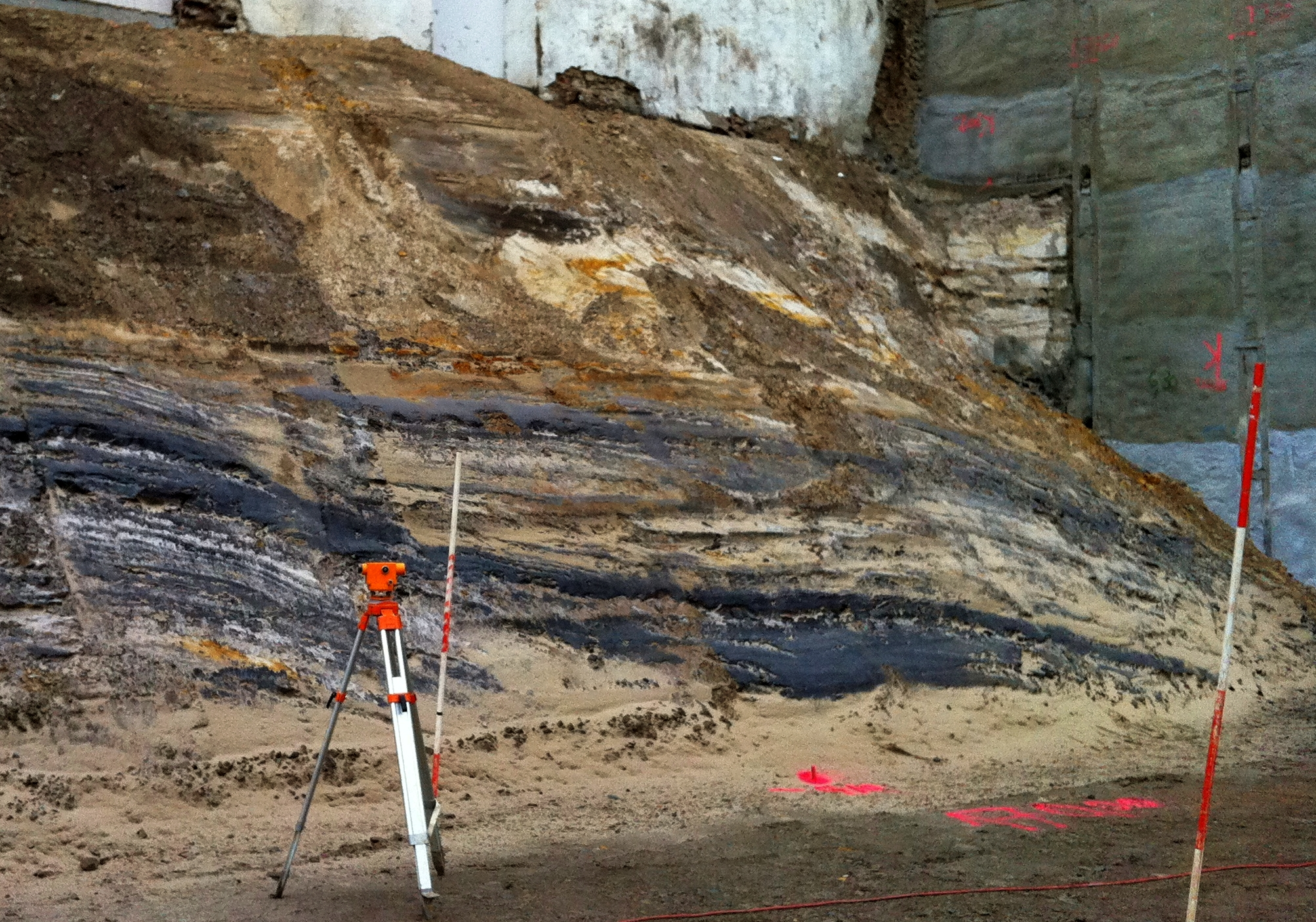
- The Aachen Formation in Hergenrath
- Type: Geological formation
- Underlies: Vaals Formation
- Overlies: Limburg Group

Lithology
- Primary: Sandstone

Location
- Coordinates: 50.8°N 5.9°E
- Approximate paleocoordinates: 40.8°N 7.3°E
- Region: Dutch Limburg, Belgian Limburg, North Rhine-Westphalia
- Country: Belgium, Germany, Netherlands

Type section
- Named for: Aachen
- Region: North Rhine-Westphalia
- Country: Germany
- Aachen Formation (Netherlands)

The Aachen Formation (Dutch: Formatie van Aken, German: Aachen-Formation) is an Upper Cretaceous geologic formation in the southern Netherlands and northeastern Belgium and adjacent Germany.

It is stratigraphically equivalent to the middle part of the Chalk Group of England, and named after the German city of Aachen.

== Geography ==
The formation crops out in southern Belgian and Dutch Limburg and adjacent areas in Germany. The formation can also be found in the subsurface of West Flanders, where it forms an aquifer from which drinking water is won.

== Geology ==
The Aachen Formation consists of glauconite-bearing sand. It was deposited during the Santonian and Campanian ages (85.8 to 70.6 million years ago) of the Cretaceous Period.

The formation rests unconformably on top of Carboniferous rocks of the Limburg Group, which are more than three times as old. Overlying the Aachen Formation is the Vaals Formation, equivalent to the upper part of the Chalk Group of England.

== Fossil content ==
Among others, the following fossils have been reported from the formation:

=== Corals ===
- Cunnolites

=== Flora ===
- Nicolia
- Verrutriletes

Conifers

- Cycadeospermum

Pollen

- Chrysotheca
- Geleenites
- Spherites
- Triletes

== See also ==
- List of stratigraphic units in the Netherlands
- List of fossiliferous stratigraphic units in the Netherlands
- List of fossiliferous stratigraphic units in Belgium
- List of fossiliferous stratigraphic units in Germany
