= Veldhoven Formation =

- Type: Geological formation

Location
- Coordinates: 51°47′16″N 5°25′38″E
- Country: Netherlands

The Veldhoven Formation (Dutch: Formatie van Veldhoven; abbreviation: VE) is a geologic formation in the subsurface of the Netherlands. The formation consists of an alternation of marine clay and sand from the Oligocene epoch.

== Lithology ==
The Veldhoven Formation has a shallow marine (less than 200 meters deep) or beach facies. It consists of an alternation of glauconiferous and micaceous fine sands and micaceous clays. In some places hardgrounds or shell-rich layers occur.

The formation is Chattian, 28.4 to 23.0 million years old.

== Stratigraphy ==
The Veldhoven Formation is part of the Middle North Sea Group and is named after the town of Veldhoven in North Brabant, the type location. Actually the type section is in a well log, since the formation only rarely crops out at the surface.

The formation is subdivided into three members (Dutch: laagpakketten):

- the Someren Member, glauconiferous fine sand;
- the Wintelre Member, greenish silty clay;
- the Voort Member, greenish clayey sand, locally rich in fossils, especially molluscs and otoliths

The Veldhoven Formation is usually found stratigraphically on top of the slightly older (early Oligocene) sands and clays of the Rupel Formation. On top of the Veldhoven Formation are the marine sands of the Breda Formation (early Miocene), which are distinguishable by their darker colour.

The formation can be correlated with the Belgian Voort Formation.
