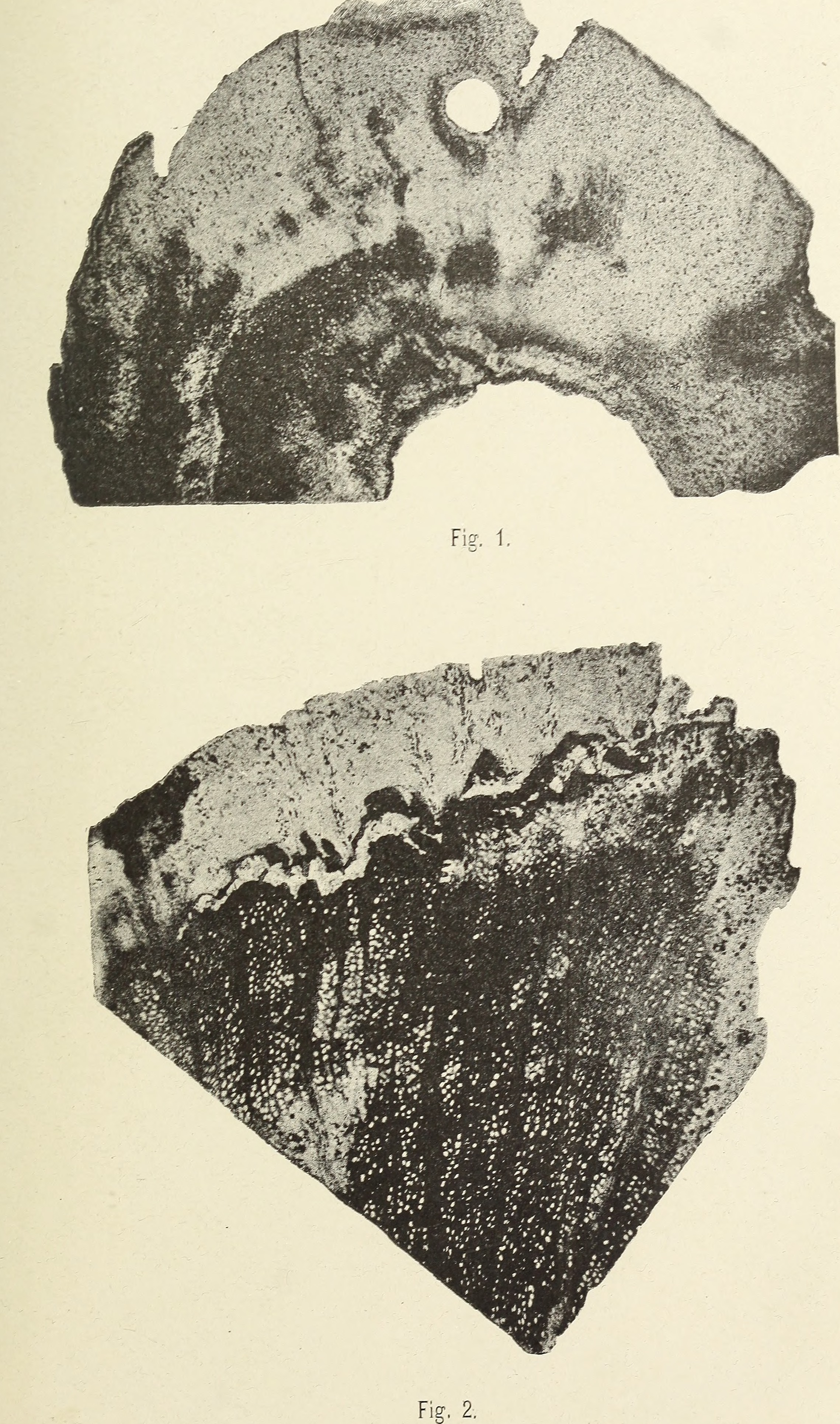
- Cross-sections of fossilized specimens of N. moresneti from the Aachen Formation

Scientific classification
- Kingdom: Plantae
- Clade: Tracheophytes
- Clade: Angiosperms
- Genus: †Nicolia; Unger, 1842

Type species
- Nicolia aegyptiaca Unger, 1842

Other species
- †N. caledonica Crié, 1899; †N. moresneti Hovelacque, 1889 vide Unger, 1842; †N. tunetana Crié, 1899; †N. zealandica? Unger, 1842

Synonyms
- Aachenosaurus Smets, 1888; Aachenoxylon Hovelacque, 1889/90

= Nicolia (plant) =

Nicolia Temporal range: Late Cretaceous - Pleistocene, 85–0.0117 Ma

Dubious species of prehistoric plant

Nicolia is a genus of fossilized wood from the Late Cretaceous to Pleistocene of Belgium, Ethiopia, Egypt, New Caledonia, New Zealand, and Tunisia. The type species is N. aegyptiaca.

== Discovery and naming ==
The type species Nicolia aegyptiaca was named in 1842 by Franz Unger. The first specimens were collected in Egypt and it is often synonymised with Sterculioxylon aegypticum.

The discovery of N. caledonica suggests the genus existed until the Pleistocene.

=== Aachenosaurus ===
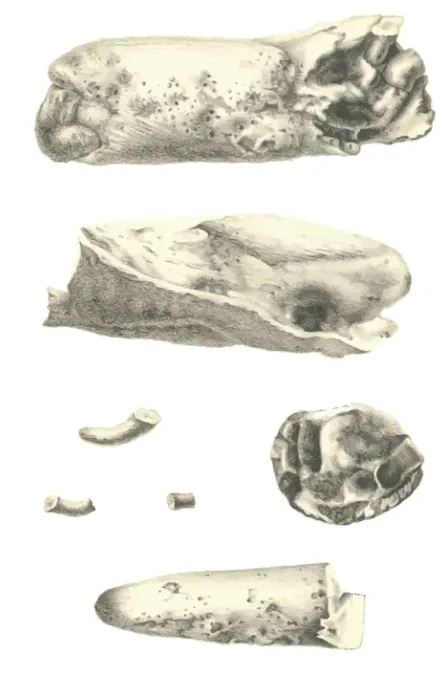
Specimen of N. moresneti that was once known as Aachenosaurus multidens

Independently in 1887, the name Aachenosaurus was created by the scientist (and abbé) Gerard Smets based on fossilized fragments found in the Aachen Formation of Moresnet (which was a neutral territory between Belgium and Germany). Smets considered that the specimen was a hadrosaur reaching an estimated 4 to 5 metres (13 to 16 ft) in length which might have had dermal spines. He defended this conclusion, citing that the fossils had been examined visually with the naked eye, magnifying lenses and with the microscope. However, his error was soon demonstrated by Louis Dollo. Smets at first tried to defend his original identification but was again proven wrong by a neutral commission.

Aachenosaurus has since been considered to be a synonym of Nicolia moresneti.

A synonym of Aachenosaurus is Aachenoxylon, which was coined by Dr Maurice Hovelacque in 1889/1890.

== Species ==
- Nicolia aegyptiaca (Type species) — Late Cretaceous of Egypt
- Nicolia caledonica — Pleistocene of Ducos Island, New Caledonia
- Nicolia moresneti — Late Cretaceous of Belgium
- Nicolia tunetana — Pliocene of Tunisia
- Nicolia zealandica? — Cenozoic of New Zealand. Its placement within Nicolia has been questioned.

=== Previously assigned species ===
- Nicolia giarabubensis (now Sterculioxylon giarabubense) — Oligocene of Egypt (Fayyum)
- Nicolia minor (now Bombacoxylon owenii)
- Nicolia oweni (now Bombacoxylon owenii)
- Nicolia wiedemanni (now Sterculioxylon aegyptiacum) — Egypt
