= Ieper Group =

Geologic formation in Belgium

Ieper Group Groupe d'Ypres
- Stratigraphic range: Ypresian; ~54–50 Ma
- Type: Geologic group
- Sub-units: Kortrijk, Mons-en-Pévèle, Tielt, Hyon & Gentbrugge Formations
- Underlies: Zenne Group; Aalter Formation
- Overlies: Landen Group; Tienen Formation
- Thickness: >225 m (738 ft)

Lithology
- Primary: Sandstone, claystone
- Other: Siltstone

Location
- Coordinates: 51.3°N 4.3°E
- Approximate paleocoordinates: 46.7°N 1.5°E
- Region: East Flanders, West Flanders, Antwerp, Hainaut, Flemish & Walloon Brabant
- Country: Belgium
- Extent: Campine Basin

Type section
- Named for: Ypres (Ieper)
- Ieper Group (Belgium)

The Ieper Group (Dutch: Ieper Groep; French: Groupe d'Ypres) is a group of rock strata in the subsurface of northwest Belgium. The group is subdivided into three marine formations, all formed during the Ypresian, a single age of the geologic timescale (55.8 to 48.6 million years ago, the oldest age of the Eocene epoch). Both age and group are named after the West Flemish town of Ypres, for which the Dutch name is "Ieper".

== History of definition ==
=== Ypresian ===
In the original description of his newly introduced Ypresian stage Dumont (1850) did mention neither stratotype nor type locality. He simply referred to the "collines d'Ypres" or Ieper Hills, as the area where the unit is best developed. However, it remains unclear what is meant by this term. The town of Ieper is situated in western Belgium, at the southern end of a small, NW-SE oriented depression (15 to 20 metres (49 to 66 ft) above mean sea level), surrounded from north to south by a series of low hills (between 25 and 45 metres (82 and 148 ft)). Dumont probably envisaged the elevated zones a few km north and east of Ieper (St.-Jan, Zillebeke, etc.), where clay beds have been quarried for brick and tile making for quite a long time.

A new stratotype for the Lutetian was proposed by Blondeau (1981) about 50 kilometres (31 mi) north of Paris. The neostratotype is located on the right bank of the river Oise at St. Leu d'Esserent and the large quarry at St. Vaast-les-Mello (Oise).

Since 2003, the Global Stratotype Section and Point (GSSP) defined by the International Commission on Stratigraphy (ICS) for the Ypresian is set in the Dababiya section close to Luxor, Egypt, where the uppermost Tarawan Limestone, the Esna Formation and the lowermost Thebes Limestone define the Ypresian sequence. Several other proposals for the lithostratigraphic redefinition of the top of the Ypresian exist; among others the Punta Torcida Formation of the Austral or Magallanes Basin in Tierra del Fuego, the Azkorri Sandstone in the Gorrondatxe section of the North Pyrenean Foreland or Basque–Cantabrian Basin, the Agost section close to Alicante in the Agost Basin in the Betic Cordillera, and the Fortuna section north of Murcia in the Prebetic realm of the Betic Cordillera, all in Spain. Other proposed type sections for the Ypresian-Lutetian boundary are located in France, Italy, Israel, Tunisia, Morocco, Cuba and Mexico.

=== Stratigraphy ===
The Ieper Group was redefined by Steurbaut in 2006, and is since 2017 subdivided into five formations by the National Commission for the Stratigraphy of Belgium, from youngest to oldest:

Age	Chron	Group	Formation	Member	Lithologies	Maximum thickness	Notes
Ypresian	C22n	Zenne	Aalter	Oedelem Sand	Sandstone		
Ypresian	C22r	Zenne	Aalter	Beernem Sand	Sandstone		
Ypresian	C22r	Ieper	Gentbrugge	Aalterbrugge Lignite	Lignite	50 m (160 ft)	
Ypresian	C22r	Ieper	Gentbrugge	Vierzele Sand	Sandstone	50 m (160 ft)	
Ypresian	C22r	Ieper	Gentbrugge	Pittem Clay	Claystone	50 m (160 ft)	
Ypresian	C22r	Ieper	Gentbrugge	Merelbeke Clay	Claystone	50 m (160 ft)	
Ypresian	C22r	Ieper	Gentbrugge	Kwatrecht Complex		50 m (160 ft)	
Ypresian	C22r	Ieper	Mons-en-Pévèle		Micaceous sandstone	A few meters	
Ypresian	C23n	Ieper	Hyon	Mont-Panisel	Sandstone	25 m (82 ft)	
Ypresian	C23n	Ieper	Hyon	Bois-la-Haut Sand	Sandstone	25 m (82 ft)	
Ypresian	C23n	Ieper	Hyon	Egem	Claystone	25 m (82 ft)	
Ypresian	C23n	Ieper	Tielt	Egemkapel	Sandstone	25 m (82 ft)	
Ypresian	C23n	Ieper	Tielt	Kortemark	Siltstone	25 m (82 ft)	
Ypresian	C23r	Ieper	Kortrijk	Aalbeke	Claystone	125 m (410 ft)	
Ypresian	C24n	Ieper	Kortrijk	Roubaix	Claystone	125 m (410 ft)	
Ypresian	C24r	Ieper	Kortrijk	Orchies		125 m (410 ft)	
Ypresian	C24r	Ieper	Kortrijk	Mt. Héribou	Claystone	125 m (410 ft)	
Ypresian	C24r	Ieper	Kortrijk	Het Zoute	Siltstone	125 m (410 ft)	
Ypresian	C24r	Landen	Tienen	Oosthoek Sand	Sandstone		
Ypresian	C24r	Landen	Tienen	Knokke Clay	Claystone		
Ypresian	C24r	Landen	Tienen	Dormaal Sand	Sandstone		

=== Outcrops ===
The Kortrijk Formation predominantly consists of marine clay. It occurs in the west and north of Belgium, the Tielt Formation, consisting of fine sand, is found in the subsurface of western and central Belgium and the Gentbrugge Formation, which comprises an alternation of clay, silt and fine sand, crops out in East and West Flanders.

The Ieper Group lies stratigraphically on top of the Landen Group (upper Paleocene) and below the Zenne Group (like the Ieper Group early Eocene in age). Unlike the Zenne Group, the Ieper Group can also occur in more southern parts of Belgium, for example in the Mons Basin.

== Paleontology ==
The Tielt Formation has provided fossils of mammals, birds and reptiles.

== See also ==
- List of fossiliferous stratigraphic units in Belgium
- Ypresian formations
  - Fur Formation of Denmark
  - London Clay Formation of England
  - Silveirinha Formation of Portugal
- Wasatchian formations
  - Nanjemoy Formation of the eastern United States
  - Wasatch Formation of the western United States
- Itaboraian formations
  - Itaboraí Formation of Brazil
  - Laguna del Hunco Formation of Argentina
