= Opglabbeek Formation =

Belgian geologic formation

- Stratigraphic range: Middle to Late Paleocene (Selandian); ~61.6–59.2 Ma
- Unit of: Hesbaye Group
- Sub-units: Opoeteren, Eisden
- Underlies: Heers Formation
- Overlies: Houthem Formation
- Thickness: 25-60 meters

Lithology
- Primary: clay, lignite, sand

Location
- Coordinates: 51.08°N 5.73°E
- Region: Limburg
- Country: Belgium

Type section
- Named for: Opglabbeek, Belgium

The Opglabbeek Formation is a geologic formation in the subsurface of the eastern part of Belgian Limburg. The heterogeneous formation consists of clay and sand that was deposited lagoonally and fluvially during the early Selandian (Middle Paleocene, about 60 million years old). The formation is named after the town of Opglabbeek in Limburg.

The Opglabbeek Formation is subdivided into two members: the Opoeteren Member (red clay with layers of lignite) and the Eisden Member (fine sand with crags).

The Opglabbeek Formation's thickness ranges between 25 metres (82 ft) and 60 metres (200 ft), reaching its greatest thickness as it abuts the Roer Valley Graben. It lies stratigraphically on top of the Houthem Formation (early Paleocene calcareous sandstone). It is the lateral equivalent of the Hainin Formation. On top of it lies the Heers Formation (Middle Paleocene sands and marls). The Opglabbeek Formation is part of the Hesbaye Group and can be correlated with parts of the Landen Formation of adjacent areas in the southern Netherlands.
