= Oosterhout Formation =

The Oosterhout Formation is a geological formation in the subsoil in the central and south area of the Netherlands. The formation was formed during the Pliocene (5.333 million to 2.58 million years BP). The formation was named after the city of Oosterhout in the province of North Brabant.

The Oosterhout Formation mainly consists of sand, often containing glauconite. In the upper layers, clay is also present. The Oosterhout Formation is usually right on top of the Miocene Breda Formation.
