= Tongeren Group =

Sequence of rock strata in Belgium

The Tongeren Group is a lithostratigraphic unit (a sequence of rock strata) in the subsurface of Belgium. It consists of shallow marine, epicontinental and/or continental clays and sands from the late Eocene to early Oligocene epochs (between 37 and 30 million years old).

The Belgian Tongeren Group correlates with the Dutch Tongeren Formation. The name was introduced by André Hubert Dumont in 1849.

== Subdivision ==
The Tongeren Group is subdivided into three formations. From top to bottom these are:

- the Borgloon Formation, lagunal or fluvial shell rich sand and clay;
- the Sint Huibrechts-Hern Formation, marine shell bearing sand and clay;
- the Zelzate Formation, shallow marine glauconiferous sand with thin clay layers.

== Stratigraphic relations ==
In northwest Belgium the Tongeren Group (represented in that area mostly by the Zelzate Formation) is stratigraphically lying on top of the Maldegem Formation (middle Eocene clay and sand). This formation is lacking in the east of the country, where the Tongeren Group is found directly on top of rocks with older ages, like the Landen Group.

The Tongeren Group is usually overlain by deposits of the late Oligocene Rupel Group.
