= Maldegem Formation =

Geologic formation in Belgium

The Maldegem Formation (Dutch: Formatie van Maldegem; old name: Kallo Complex) is a geologic formation in the Belgian subsurface. The formation consists of alternating marine clay and sand strata, deposited during the late Eocene.

The Maldegem Formation crops out in the provinces of East Flanders and West Flanders and in the area between the Zenne and Dender rivers. In the northern parts of Flanders it forms an up to 50 meters thick sequence in the subsurface. Further south and to the east (in the Campine of the province of Antwerp) the formation pinches out and can be only a few meters in thickness.

== Lithology ==
The Maldegem Formation is an alternating sequence of grey glauconiferous fine sands and greyish blue glauconiferous heavy clay. It was deposited during the late Lutetian and Bartonian ages (between 42 and 37 million years old).

== Stratigraphy ==
Seven members can be recognized within the Maldegem Formation: Wemmel Member, Asse Member, Ursel Member, Onderdale Member, Zomergem Member, Buisputten Member and Onderdijke Member.

The Maldegem Formation is not part of a stratigraphic group and forms an independent unit in the lithostratigraphy of Belgium. Stratigraphically on top of it is usually the Zelzate Formation (green grey sand with a Priabonian to Rupelian age), part of the Tongeren Group. The Maldegem Formation is usually found on top of the Lede Formation (calcareous grey sand with a middle Lutetian age), which belongs to the Zenne Group.
