= Landen Formation =

Geologic formation in the Netherlands

The Landen Formation (abbreviation: LA) is a lithostratigraphic unit (a set of rock strata) in the subsurface of the Netherlands. This formation shares its name with the Belgian Landen Group, but the Belgian unit is thinner and has different definitions. The Landen Formation consists of shallow marine and lagoonal sediments (mostly clay, sandy clay and marl) from the late Paleocene to early Eocene (between 58 and 54 million years old). Dutch stratigraphers see the Landen Formation as part of the Lower North Sea Group.

== Lithology ==
The Landen Formation can be maximally 150 meters in thickness. It is subdivided into five only regionally recognized members:

- The Swalmen Member, lagoonal clay, sometimes with small lignite layers;
- The Reusel Member, green sandy clay, loam and sand;
- The Liessel Member, mica, pyrite and glauconite bearing clay, containing plant fossils;
- The Orp Member, greenish grey sand;
- The Gelinden Member, calcareous clay.

Some of the sandy layers can have been made into sandstone by diagenetic processes. The whole formation is interpreted as one megacycle: the lower parts (Swalmen and Orp) represent a marine transgression, while the upper parts (Reusel and Liessel) represent a regression.

== Stratigraphy ==
The Dutch Landen Formation is not totally equal with the Belgian Landen Group. In Belgium, the Orp and Gelinden Members are seen as one separate formation, the Heers Formation. The Dutch Landen Formation correlates with the Belgian Heers Formation, Hannut Formation, Tienen Formation and parts of the Opglabbeek Formation.

The Landen Formation lies normally on top of a nonconformity with the Dutch Chalk Group, which is usually represented by the early Paleocene Houthem Formation. In most places the early Eocene Dongen Formation is found on top of the Landen Formation.

=== References ===
- Adrichem Boogaert, H.A. van & Kouwe, W.F.P. (eds.); 1993: Stratigraphic nomenclature of the Netherlands, revision and update by RGD and NOGEPA, Mededelingen Rijks Geologische Dienst 50, pp. 1–39
