= Aalter Formation =

Geologic formation in Belgium

- Stratigraphic range: Ypresian to early Lutetian
- Type: Geological formation
- Thickness: up to 30 metres (100 ft)

Location
- Location: Northwest Belgium
- Country: Belgium

Type section
- Named for: Aalter

The Aalter Formation (Dutch: Formatie van Aalter, abbreviation: Aa; named after the town of Aalter in East Flanders) is a geologic formation in the subsurface of northwest Belgium. The formation consists of marine clay and sand, deposited in the shallow sea that covered northern and central Belgium in the Eocene epoch.

The Aalter Formation crops out in the provinces of East Flanders and West Flanders and forms a maximally 30 meters thick layer in the subsurface. To the east, the formation wedges out and becomes thinner. Due to this wedging out, the formation does not occur anymore in the province of Antwerp. The base of the formation consists of glauconiferous clayey sand alternating with organic rich (humus and peat) layers (the Aalterbrugge Member). On top of this is a sequence of clay, sand and sandstone layers, rich in fossils (the Beernem Member). The top of the formation consists of fossil-rich, glauconiferous fine sand (the Oedelem Member).

The Aalter Formation was formed during the late Ypresian to early Lutetian ages, giving it an age of around 48 million years. It is part of the Zenne Group and is covered by the Brussels Formation. If the Brussels Formation is absent, the Lede Formation can be found on top of the Aalter Formation. Both are like the Aalter Formation part of the Zenne Group. Stratigraphically below the Aalter Formation are deposits of the Gentbrugge Formation (late Ypresian marine clays and sands).

== Fossil content ==
=== Chondrichthyes ===
Chondrichthyes reported from the Tielt Formation
Genus	Species	Location	Stratigraphic position	Material	Notes	Images
Urobatis	U. molleni	Aalter.	Venericarda planicosta lerichei horizon.	Numerous teeth.	A round ray also known from the Tielt & Brussels Sand formations.	

== See also ==
- List of sedimentary formations in Belgium
