= Landen Group =

Lithostratigraphic unit

The Landen Group is a lithostratigraphic unit (a "group" of rock strata) in the Belgian subsurface. The group consists of two formations of Thanetian (late Paleocene) to Ypresian (early Eocene) age. The Landen Group is named after the town of Landen in Flemish Brabant.

== Subdivision ==
The Landen Group is subdivided into two formations:

- The Hannut Formation, an alternation of marine clays, sands and limestones;
- The Tienen Formation, a lagoonal-continental alternation of clay, sand and lignite. This formation is known for its fossils.

Both formations can be found in the subsurface of all northern Belgium. They crop out in the province of Hainaut.

== Stratigraphy ==
The Landen Group is stratigraphically on top of the Bertaimont Formation or Heers Formation (marine marls, sands and clays of Selandian to Thanetian age). In the Belgian lithostratigraphy, the Landen Group is overlain by the Ieper Group, marine clays and sands of Ypresian age.

The Landen Group shares its name with the Landen Formation in the lithostratigraphy of the Netherlands. However, this Dutch formation contains not only the equivalents of the Belgian Landen Group but also strata that correlate with the Belgian Opglabbeek Formation and Heers Formation.
