= Rupel Formation =

Geologic formation in the Netherlands

The Rupel Formation (abbreviation: RU) is a geologic formation in the subsurface of the Netherlands that consists of Oligocene marine sands and clays. The Rupel Formation is part of the Middle North Sea Group and correlates exactly with the Belgian Rupel Group.

== Name ==
The Rupel Formation was first described by André Hubert Dumont in 1849. The formation is taken from Belgian lithostratigraphy, although it is considered a group in Belgium. The age in which the formation formed is the Rupelian (34 to 28 million years ago), a subdivision of the Oligocene epoch. The age and the formation are both named after the Belgian river Rupel.

== Facies and lithologies ==
The Rupel Formation can be 250 meters thick at maximum. During the Rupelian age the Netherlands (and Belgium) were covered by a shallow sea, which became deeper towards the northwest. In the northwest, the sedimentary facies can be more than 500 m deep marine, while in southeastern parts of the Netherlands the formation has a near coastal facies.

The formation is subdivided in four members: the Bilzen Member (yellow-white glauconiferous fine sand, containing fossils), the Boom Member (a thick clay deposit, containing loam layers and septaria), the Eigenbilzen Member (strongly layered sands) and the Ratum Member (sand, clay and loam, appears only in the east of the Netherlands).

== Stratigraphy ==
In the southwest of the Netherlands the Rupel Formation lies stratigraphically on top of the late Eocene to early Oligocene Tongeren Formation. Further east the Rupel Formation is found on top of the Eocene sands of the Dongen Formation. In the east, on the Middel-Netherlands High, the base of the formation can also be a nonconformity with Mesozoic deposits.

In some places the younger Veldhoven Formation lies on top of the Rupel Formation. In other places the top of the Rupel Formation is a hiatus, on which Neogene formations (such as the Breda Formation or Naaldwijk Formation) can be found.
