= Heers Formation =

Geologic formation in Belgium

The Heers Formation (Dutch: Formatie van Heers; French: Formation de Heers; abbreviation: Hs) is a geologic formation in the subsurface of Belgium. The formation consists of sand and marl and was deposited in the shallow sea that covered Belgium during the middle to late Selandian age of the Paleocene epoch.

The formation is subdivided into two members: at the base green, glauconiferous sand (Orp Member), on top calcareous clay and marl in which plant fossils have been found (Gelinden Member). This sequence formed during a marine transgression. The Orp Member represents a near coastal marine environment, the Gelinden Member formed in shallow marine circumstances but further from the land.

The Heers Formation occurs in the subsurface of the northern and eastern parts of Flanders. In Limburg it reaches its maximal thickness at about 60 meters. The Heers Formation is stratigraphically on top of Cretaceous and early Paleocene deposits, such as the Opglabbeek Formation or the Houthem Formation. The Heers Formation is almost everywhere overlain by the Hannut Formation (clay, sand and limestone from the late Paleocene).

The Orp and Gelinden members are also recognized in the Netherlands (north of Belgium). Dutch stratigraphers see them as part of the Landen Formation.
