= Zenne Group =

Group of rock strata in Belgium

The Zenne Group (Dutch: Zenne Groep) is a group of rock strata in the subsurface of central and northwest Belgium. The group consists of three formations, all from the Ypresian and Lutetian ages (early Eocene, 50 to 40 million years old). These formation have their shallow marine facies in common.

The three formations are:

- the Aalter Formation, greenish sands and clays, found in East Flanders and West Flanders.
- the Brussels Formation, marls and sands, found in Flemish and Walloon Brabant, Hainaut and Namur.
- the Lede Formation, calcareous sands, found in almost all central Belgium.

Stratigraphically on top of the Zenne Group are the late Eocene sands and clays of the Maldegem Formation, which is not divided into a group. The Zenne Group is almost everywhere found on top of the early Eocene Ieper Group.
