= Lede Formation =

Geologic formation in Belgium

The Lede Formation (Dutch: Formatie van Lede; abbreviation: Ld) is a geologic formation in the subsurface of Belgium. The formation is named after the town of Lede in East Flanders. It consists of shallow-marine limestone and sandstone, deposited in the former sea that covered Belgium during the Eocene.

The Lede Formation crops out in East Flanders, Flemish Brabant, Antwerp and parts of Hainaut, Walloon Brabant and West Flanders. It forms a laterally continuous unit of calcareous and glauconiferous sandstone, sandy limestone and calcareous sandstone, which reaches a thickness of up to 15 metres. The formation is characterised by fossils of the nummulite Nummulites variolarius. It is not subdivided into members.

The age of the Lede Formation is middle Lutetian (about 44 million years old) and it is part of the Zenne Group. On top of the Lede Formation is normally the younger Maldegem Formation (marine clays and sands of Bartonian age). Below the Lede Formation are the Brussels Formation and Aalter Formation, both also part of the Zenne Group.
