= Hannut Formation =

Geologic formation in Belgium

- Stratigraphic range: Thanetian; ~57 Ma
- Type: Geological formation
- Unit of: Landen Group
- Underlies: Limestone, siltstone and sandstone
- Thickness: up to 100 metres (330 ft)

Lithology
- Primary: Marine clay
- Other: Silt

Location
- Country: Belgium

Type section
- Named for: Hannut

The Hannut Formation (French: Formation de Hannut; Dutch: Formatie van Hannut; abbreviation: Hn) is a geologic formation in the subsurface of northern Belgium. The formation consists of marine clay and silt, alternating with more sandy layers. On top of this the lithology changes to limestone, siltstone and sandstone and the top of the formation is formed by a layer of glauconite bearing sand. The Hannut Formation was formed during the early to middle Thanetian age (Late Paleocene, about 57 million years ago).

The formation is named after the town of Hannut in the province of Liège.

== Lithologies ==
The Hannut Formation can be about 100 meters thick in the Campine Basin and about 55 meters thick in the Mons Basin. In between these two basins the thickness varies between 40 and 20 meters. The formation is subdivided into five members:

- The Chercq Member, tuffite, clay and glauconite bearing sand layers. This member is most distinctively recognizable in the province of Hainaut;
- The Lincent Member, a locally lithified, predominantly clayey layer. It occurs in and around the Hesbaye region;
- The Halen Member, clayey silt and silty sand;
- The Waterschei Member, calcareous clay and silty clay. It occurs in the northeast of Belgium;
- The Grandglise Member, the upper glauconiferous sand. It is almost always present.

== Stratigraphic relations ==
In Belgian lithostratigraphy the Hannut Formation is one of the two formations of the Landen Group. The other formation is the younger Tienen Formation (continental and lagoonal sands and clays from the late Thanetian age), which is normally found on top of the Hannut Formation. In the northern and eastern parts of Flanders the Hannut Formation lies stratigraphically on top of the Heers Formation (middle Paleocene sands and marls).

The Hannut Formation correlates with parts of the Landen Formation in the Netherlands.
