= Tienen Formation =

Geologic formation in Belgium

The Tienen Formation (Dutch: Formatie van Tienen; French: Formation de Tienen; abbreviation: Ti) is a geologic formation in the subsurface of northern Belgium. The formation crops out in the province of Hainaut and the Hesbaye region in the province of Limburg. It has a late Thanetian (Paleocene) to early Ypresian (Eocene) age.

The Tienen Formation consists of clay with thin lignite layers and lithified wood, sand (sometimes with shells) and marl. It has a continental to lagoonal sedimentary facies. The formation is a lagerstätte for fossils of vertebrate animals.

The Tienen Formation forms together with the older marine clays and sands of the Hannut Formation the Landen Group. The Tienen Formation is subdivided into four members: the Erquelines Member, the Knokke Member, the Loksbergen Member and the Dormaal Member. Stratigraphically the formation is positioned in between the older Hannut Formation and the younger Kortrijk Formation (Ieper Group).
