= Houthem Formation =

Geologic formation in Belgium and the Netherlands

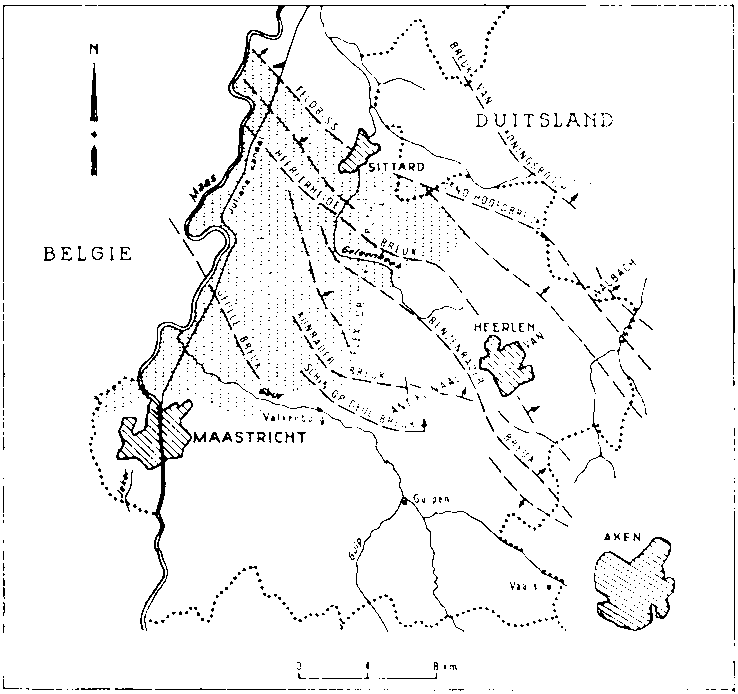
Houthem formation

The Houthem Formation, named after the Dutch town of Houthem, is a geological formation that crops out in the south of Belgian and Dutch Limburg. It has also been found in borings in the northeastern part of the Campine Basin. The formation consists of calcareous sandstone and was formed about 60 million years ago, in the Paleocene epoch.

== Lithology ==
The Houthem Formation consists of maximally 30 metres of light grey to light yellow calcareous arenites. The arenite can contain calcareous concretions, fossils and hardgrounds with shell fragments. At other places lenses of boundstone occur, formed by red algae.

The hardgrounds make it possible to subdivide the formation into three members: the Geleen Member, the Bunde Member and the Geulhem Member.

== Stratigraphy ==
Dutch stratigraphers see the Houthem Formation as the youngest formation of the Chalk Group, because it has a similar lithology with the older formations in this group. Belgian stratigraphers see it as part of the Hesbaye Group, which contains Paleocene formations.

The base of the Houthem Formation is in the Vroenhoven Horizon, probably the Dutch and Belgian equivalent of the Cretaceous–Paleogene boundary (K–T boundary). Below the Houthem Formation is the Late Cretaceous Maastricht Formation. In the Campine Basin the Houthem Formation is overlain by the Paleocene Opglabbeek Formation (clay and sand) and the Heers Formation (marl).

== Bibliography ==
- Bless, M.J.M.; Dusar, M.; Felder, P.J. & Swennen, R.; 1993: Lithology and biostratigraphy of Upper Cretaceous-Paleocene carbonates in the Molenbeersel borehole (NE Belgium), Geologie en Mijnbouw 71, pp. 239-257.
- Laga, P.; Louwye, S. & Geets, S.; 2001: Paleogene and Neogene lithostratigraphic units (Belgium), Geologica Belgica 4, pp. 135-152.
- Felder, W.M.; 1975: Lithostratigrafie van het Boven-Krijt en het Dano-Montien in Zuid-Limburg en het aangrenzende gebied, in: Toelichting bij de geologische overzichtskaarten van Nederland, Rijks Geologische Dienst, Haarlem, pp. 63-72.
- Romein, B.J.; 1962: On the type locality of the Maastrichtian (Dumont, 1849), the upper boundary of that stage and on the transgression of a Maastrichtian s.l. in Southern Limburg, Mededelingen Geologische Stichting, nieuwe serie 15, pp. 77-84.
