= Breda Formation =

Geologic formation in Netherlands

- Stratigraphic range: Chattian-Pliocene; ~28–3.6 Ma
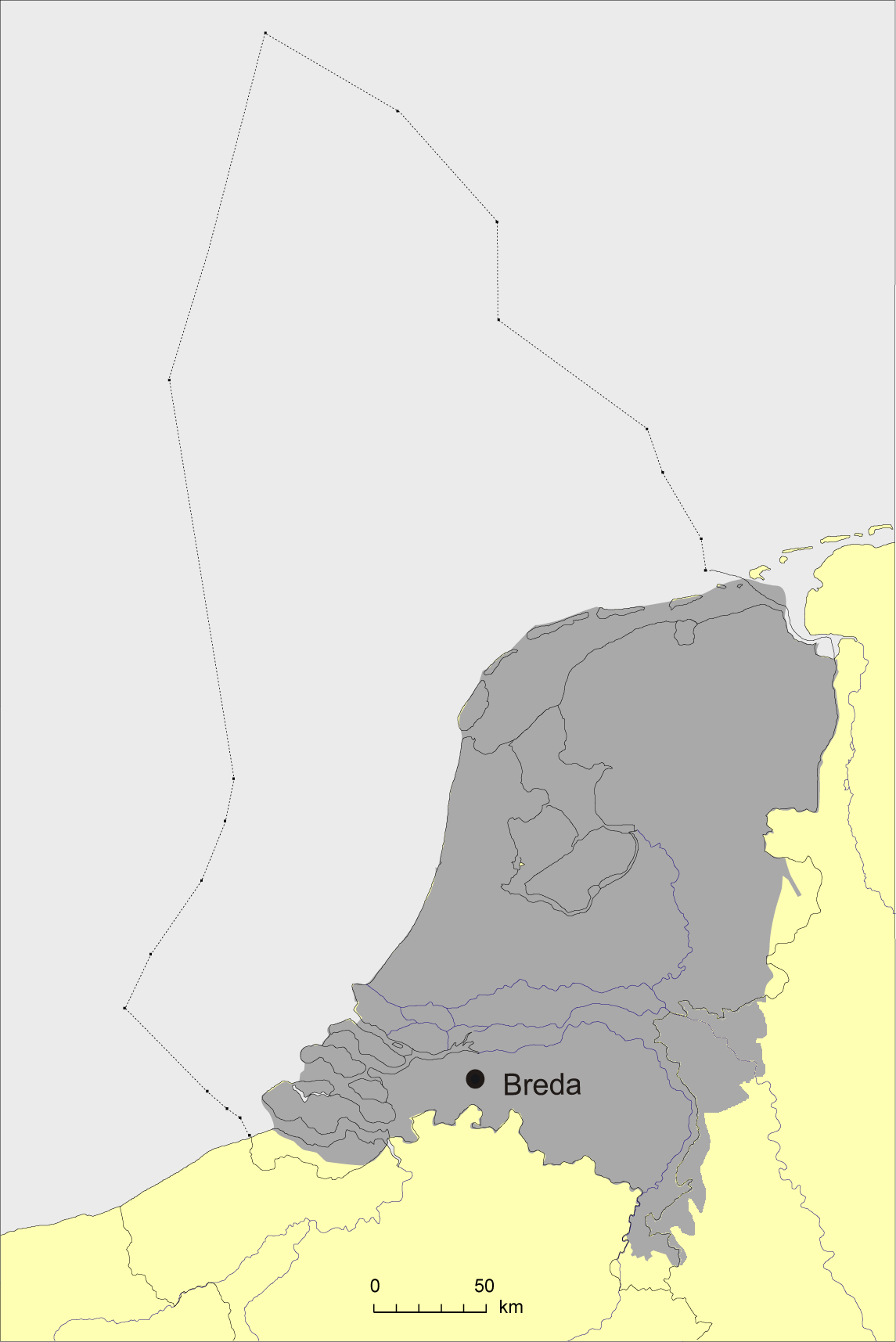
- Type: Geological formation
- Unit of: Upper North Sea Group
- Sub-units: Aalten Mb., Delden Mb., Eibergen Mb., Zenderen Mb.
- Underlies: Oosterhout Fm., Kiezeloolite Fm.
- Overlies: Rupel Fm., Veldhoven Fm.
- Thickness: up to more than 700 m (2,300 ft)

Lithology
- Primary: Marine sandstones and clays
- Other: Conglomerate

Location
- Region: Europe
- Country: Netherlands

Type section
- Named for: Breda (North Brabant)

The Breda Formation (Dutch: Formatie van Breda; abbreviation: BR) is an outdated geologic formation in the subsurface of the Netherlands. It has also been recognized in adjacent areas in Germany. The formation consists of marine glauconiferous sands and clays that were deposited during the Miocene epoch. Although the formation is not very rich in fossils, sometimes bones of fishes, mammals (Leptophoca cf. proxima, Protophocaena minima), shells and shark teeth (a.o of megalodon) are found.

== Stratigraphy and lithology ==
The Breda Formation was deposited in the shallow sea that covered the Netherlands during the Miocene. It is mostly on top of the Oligocene clays of the Rupel Formation or late Oligocene sands and clays of the Veldhoven Formation. The Breda Formation can be a couple of meters (in the Roerdal Graben) to more than 700 metres (2,300 ft) thick. The top is formed by an erosional disconformity in the south and east of the Netherlands. In the west the contact with the Pliocene Oosterhout Formation is more gradual. In the Roerdal Graben the mostly Pliocene Kiezeloolite Formation is sometimes on top of the Breda Formation.

Locally the Breda Formation can be subdivided into members: the Aalten Member (silty calcareous clay, rich in shells), the Eibergen Member (clay alternating with thin sand layers, with a basal conglomerate in which shark teeth and whale bones were found), the Zenderen Member (green, glauconiferous fine sand) and the Delden Member (sandy, glauconite and goethite bearing clay and loam.

The Breda Formation corresponds largely with the Berchem Formation of northern Belgium.
