= Geology of Dartmoor National Park =

This article describes the geology of Dartmoor National Park in Devon, in south-west England. Dartmoor gained national park status in 1951 but the designated area of 954 km^{2} (368 mi^{2}) extends beyond the upland of Dartmoor itself to include much of the surrounding land, particularly in the northeast. The geology of the national park consists of a 625 km^{2} (241 mi^{2}) core of granite intruded during the early Permian period into a sequence of sedimentary rocks originating in the Devonian and Carboniferous periods. These rocks were faulted and folded, sometimes, intensely, during the Variscan orogeny. Thermal metamorphism has also taken place around the margins of the granite pluton altering the character of the sedimentary rocks whilst mineral veins were emplaced within the granite. A small outlier of Palaeogene sediments occurs on the eastern boundary of the national park.

The area was not subject to glaciation during the Quaternary ice ages but periglacial processes have contributed to the character of the modern landscape. Tin mining and the quarrying of granite were some of the area's significant extractive industries in the past whilst tourism based in large part upon the perceived quality of the area's landscape is important for the modern economy.

== Devonian and Carboniferous sedimentary rocks ==
Several depositional basins stretched east-west across south-west England during the Devonian and Carboniferous periods and, over millions of years, each acquired a mix of sand, mud and silt which would eventually become the sandstones, mudstones and siltstones of Devon and Cornwall . This series of sedimentary basins were subject to broadly north-south compression during the course of the Variscan orogeny leading to the complexly folded and faulted geology which characterises the area today.

=== Detail of the depositional basins ===
Those sedimentary basins relevant to Dartmoor's story are i) the South Devon Basin, the rocks formed within which now stretch around the southern margins of the national park from Padstow via Plymouth to Torquay, ii) the Tavy Basin stretching from Tintagel through Tavistock to Newton Abbot and iii) the Culm Basin which corresponds to the whole of mid Devon.

- The South Devon Basin comprises a middle and upper Devonian sequence of mudstones, siltstones, sandstones and limestones together with rocks of igneous origin; tuffs and lavas.
- The Tavy Basin comprises an upper Devonian and Carboniferous sequence of mudstones and sandstones, together with chert. The Kate Brook Slate Formation is of Famennian age and consists of greenish-grey and black slates representing an outer shelf facies. The Crackington Formation which is a Namurian age turbidite deposit consisting of dark grey shales with sandstone layers.
- The Culm Basin comprises a Carboniferous sequence also of mudstones, siltstones and sandstones together with chert and tuffs.

=== Tectonic stratigraphy ===
Around the margins of the granite, the original stratigraphy – the order in which the layers of sedimentary rock were initially deposited – is complicated by the fact that thrust faulting has led to older rocks coming to lie on top of younger rocks in many areas, the contact between the two being a slide plane. If the underlying rocks have not moved substantially from their original position then they are referred to as an autochthon and the overlying rocks, which have moved into that position as an allochthon, allochthonous block or nappe. To the west of the granite, the Greystone Nappe is seen to have over-ridden the rocks of the autochthonous Kate Brook Slate Formation (also known as the Tavy Formation). The Greystone Nappe is formed from numerous formations of Carboniferous age. This nappe has been over-ridden in turn by the Blackdown Nappe consisting of the Bealsmill Formation. East of the granite in the eastern margins of the park, the Liverton tectonic unit is over-ridden by the Ilsington and then the Teign Valley units east of Haytor whilst further south it is over-ridden by the Kate Brook and Ashburton Down units.

=== Devonian rocks ===
The Kate Brook Slate Formation (a.k.a. Tavy Formation) outcrops is of Frasnian to Famennian age and consists of greenish-grey and black slates representing an outer shelf facies. These rocks are found along the southwestern margin of the park from Tavistock southwards and on the southeastern margin south from Ashburton. The grey Givetian (Famennian – Eifelian) age Chercombe Bridge Limestone Formation (393-383mya) outcrops at Buckfastleigh and also along the boundary of the park to the northeast between Ashburton and Goodstone.

=== Carboniferous rocks ===
Mudstones and sandstones of the Crackington Formation wrap around the granite outcrop in the north and the east of the national park. Within a mile or so of their contact with the granite these rocks have been thermally metamorphosed to metamudstone. Stratigraphically beneath the Crackington Formation are the cherts of the Teign (formerly Meldon) Chert Formation. These in turn overlie the metamudstones of the Combe Mudstone Formation in the northeast and the metatuffs of the Meldon Shale and Quartzite Formation around Okehampton. Sandstones, siltstones and mudstones of the St Mellion Formation occur in the Holne area and to its northeast. Its relationship to other units of the Teign Valley Group are uncertain since all contacts are tectonic. Brent Tor in the extreme west of the park is formed from basaltic lavas and tuffs of the Milton Abbot Formation, erupted between 347-329 million years ago though its lower western slopes are formed from a microgabbro which locally intrudes the rocks of the Brendon (formerly Greystone) Formation.

== Permian granite emplacement ==
The Cornubian batholith was intruded into the midst of the folded and faulted sedimentary sequence during the early part of the Permian period, around 280 million years ago. This great mass of granite is seen today as several separate outcrops at the surface throughout south-west England but all are connected as one at depth. The Dartmoor granite pluton is the largest but others include those giving rise to Bodmin Moor, West Penwith and the Scilly Isles. Within the Dartmoor outcrop as a whole there are numerous isolated pockets of finer granite, particularly in the area north of Burrator Reservoir and in the valley of the Dart below Dartmeet. The heat of the granite mass at the time of its emplacement has created a metamorphic aureole affecting the country rocks around it, altering their character by thermal metamorphism leading to the creation of hornfelsed metasediments. A variety of radiometric dating techniques place mineralisation as seen at the Birch Tor and Vitifer tin mines at around 277 Ma b.p. Geological evidence such as the occurrence of fragments of volcanic rocks geochemically associated with the batholith, found redeposited in the Crediton Trough suggests that the pluton had been ‘unroofed’ by the later Permian period. It is thought that the granite exposed at the surface today was quite close to the top of the pluton.

== Structure ==
As noted, the Devonian and Carboniferous strata are intensely faulted and folded. Numerous thrust faults define tectonic units within both sequences. The Sticklepath Fault runs on a north-west to south-east alignment in the northeast of the national park through both the granite pluton and the sedimentary succession and helps define the alignment of a part of the Bovey valley and the western margin of the Bovey Basin.

== Cenozoic era ==
The Bovey Formation occupies a small area centred on Heathfield between Bovey Tracey and Newton Abbot, partly within the national park. It consists of late Palaeogene age (Eocene to Oligocene) clays, silts and sands with some lignites, some several hundred metres thick in total

=== Tors ===
The tors of Dartmoor are amongst its most celebrated features. Their origins are still the subject of debate but some such as Linton (1955) have theorised that they were initiated during periods of intense weathering during the Tertiary period but exposed and further developed during repeated glacial stages during the Quaternary.

=== Superficial deposits ===
Superficial deposits of various kinds have accumulated during the Quaternary period. Narrow strips of alluvium i.e. accumulations of clay, silt, sand and gravel, occur along the valley floors of most Dartmoor streams and rivers. Fragmentary rock material, the product of weathering, known as head is recorded on various slopes particularly in the south and west. Peat of variable depth is extensive, notably on the moors in the northwest and around Ryder's Hill and the head of the Avon. River terrace deposits are found in places, notably around the higher reaches of the Taw and Okement.

== Economic geology ==
=== Tin mining ===
There are stanniferous mineral veins cutting the granite in the vicinity of Warren House Inn and to its east. Former mines include the Vitifer and Golden Dagger tin mines. Other veins are known at Holne Moor and the surrounding area. Other workings included Eylesbarrow and Whiteworks.

=== Stone ===
Granite was formerly quarried beneath Haytor and an unusual granite railway constructed to transfer quarried blocks to the Stover Canal and thereby to the tidal Teign estuary. Other granite quarries operated west of Princetown at Foggintor, Swelltor and Ingra Tor. A large quarry at Linhay Hill near Ashburton works the Chercombe Bridge Limestone.

=== Peat ===
Peat was worked at various locations across the moor. A notable example is the peatworks at Rattlebrook which were connected by narrow gauge rail lines from the cuttings and from which in turn a railway ran down to Bridestowe railway station between 1879 and 1932.

=== Ball clay and lignite ===
Ball clay and lignite have both been worked within the Bovey Basin on the eastern boundary of the national park.

=== Kaolin ===
There are major china clay or kaolin workings on the southwestern fringe of the national park at Lee Moor Quarry and Cholwichtown. The boundary of the designated area was drawn so as to exclude them.

== Tourism ==
Lydford Gorge is a major geological attraction on the western edge of the national park owned by the National Trust. Whitelady Waterfall and the Devil’s Cauldron are amongst the natural features in the deep gorge cut here by the River Lyd through the mudstones of the Lydford Formation. In the northeast is Becky Falls which is a private attraction where the Becka Brook drops steeply off the edge of granite into a gorge cut in Crackington Formation rocks to enter the Bovey valley. Further south on the park's boundary are several caves developed in the limestone outcrop at Buckfastleigh, including Bakers Pit, and managed both for bat conservation and for public trips.
