= Caves in Devon =

Devon contains some limestone areas mainly on the eastern side of Dartmoor. The River Dart has created several caves along its fringes. There are few caves with active streamways in Devon, excluding the Bakers Pit streamway. Devon also has its own species of cave shrimp.

== Caving clubs ==
Devon Speleological Society (DevonSS), established in 1947, is the oldest caving club in Devon. Club members meet weekly for both caving and social activities. The club owns the South Dartmoor Bunkhouse in Buckfastleigh, the bunkhouse is used by caving and other activity groups.

Exeter University Speleological Society (EUSS) is a younger club that engages in recreational caving across the country, and whose members participate in international expeditions across the world.

== Show caves ==
- Kents Cavern – A show cave near Torquay where several archaeological finds were made. Open to the public.
- Chudleigh Cavern – The first passage is open to the public. The cave continues beyond, and is open to the experienced caver. The entrance is in an open garden, which contains several other caves, parts of some of which are open to the public. This is outside the town of Chudleigh, between Dartmoor and the South Coast of England.
- Beer Quarry Caves – A set of mines near the village of Beer in east Devon. The source of Beer stone which was used for building and carving.

== Buckfastleigh ==
- The Bakers Pit cave is in the area. A previous connection to Reed's cave has been blocked up to protect cave formations.
- Higher Kiln Quarry, below Buckfast church and graveyard, contains several caves, including
  - Reed's Cave – an extensive system containing cave formations so beautiful public access is rarely allowed.
  - Joint Mitnor Cave – which contained several archeological finds.

== Other caves ==
- Afton Red Rift – another Devon cave, containing some tricky traversing
- Ash Hole Cavern – in Brixham. A scheduled monument, it has produced evidence of inhabitation since the Bronze Age.
- Cow Cave – a small cave system in the Chudleigh Gorge, of palaeontological significance.
- Pridhamsleigh Cavern - an extensive cave system on the edge of Dartmoor, containing a large lake.
