= Cornubian Massif =

Upland region and former island landmass in England

The Cornubian Massif was an upland area and source of sediment in southwest England during parts of the Late Permian to Early Cretaceous period and through most of the Cenozoic. In extent it covered approximately the current area of Devon and Cornwall. During the Jurassic period, it formed an island landmass.

== History ==
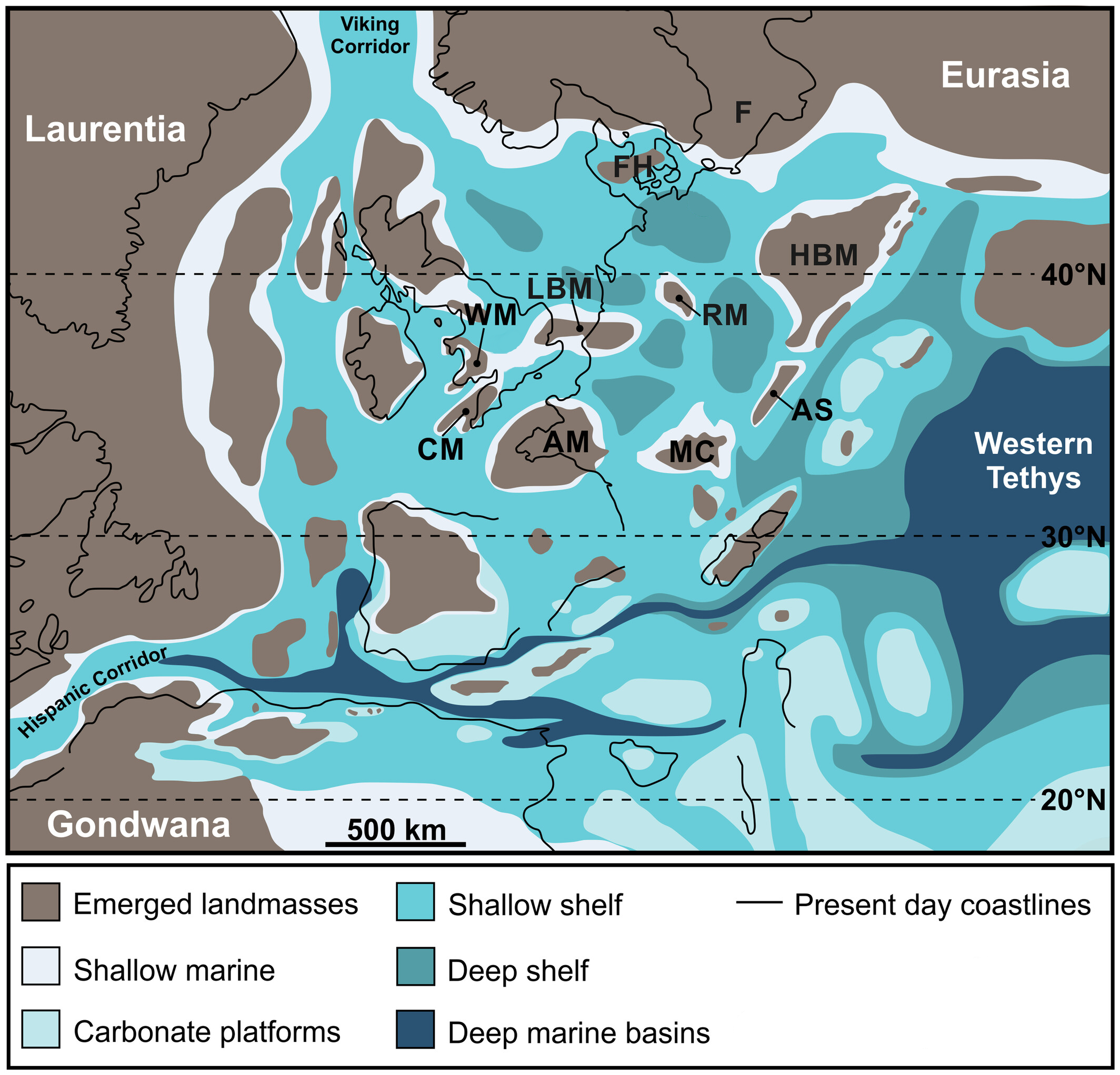
Map of Europe during the Toarcian age of the Early Jurassic, showing the position of the Cornubian Massif, labelled "CM" relative to other island landmasses.

The Cornubian Massif is underpinned by the extensive granitic Cornubian batholith that was intruded into Variscan thrust sheets of low-grade metamorphic rocks over a period of about 25 million years, between 300 and 275 Ma (million years ago), during the Early Permian. Related volcanism produced both acid and basic lavas, although only the latter are partly preserved within the lowermost parts of the Exeter Group, with the acid lavas only found as clasts in younger rocks, apart from one small exposure near Kingsand.

The unroofing of the batholith had already started in the Late Permian, as shown by the presence of granitic clasts in the St. Cyres beds. During the later Permian to Triassic the massif was bordered by a set of rift basins. To the north lay the Bristol Channel Basin, extending westwards into the South Celtic Sea Basin, to the east the precursor to the Wessex Basin and to the south the Plymouth Bay Basin. It is unclear to what extent the higher parts of the massif were covered by Permo-Triassic deposits. Latest Triassic to Lower Jurassic times saw a regional marine transgression, that may have covered much of the massif, although an emergent "spine" of land was probably still present.

During the Late Jurassic to Early Cretaceous, rifting restarted in the basins surrounding the massif. Particularly the development of thick growth sequences in the Wealden Group show that the rifting reached a maximum at this time. The massif was actively uplifting during this period providing a source for coarse clastic sediments as seen in the Wessex Basin.

During the Late Cretaceous, rifting stopped and sea levels rose, clastic sediments were cut off as the fine-grained Chalk Group was deposited. To the east of the massif there is evidence of progressive westward onlap of the Upper Cretaceous sequence onto the older rocks and it is thought likely that the whole of the massif was eventually submerged.

During the latest Cretaceous, southern Britain was affected by the early stages of the Alpine orogeny. This is marked by some indications of basin inversion and regional uplift, as shown by a lack of Maastrichtian (uppermost Cretaceous) and Danian (lowermost Paleocene) strata onshore. The opening of the North Atlantic Ocean at the start of the Eocene was accompanied by the development of the North Atlantic Igneous Province. In western Britain this caused uplift, possibly due to underplating, as shown by Apatite fission track analysis with up to 300 m of uplift in western Cornwall, reducing to 50 m in south Devon. The main phase of Alpine deformation occurred during the Oligocene to Miocene, when structures such as the Portland-Wight Monocline and the Wealden Dome were formed.

As shown by the current form of the southwestern peninsula, the area of the massif remains mostly a relatively uplifted region, shedding sediment into the surrounding basinal areas. The current topography is thought to represent an amalgamation of erosion surfaces of varying origin acquired during its Cenozoic history.
