= Cornubian batholith =

Granite rock in southwest England

Coordinates: 50.2°N 5.2°W

Map showing the main granite outcrops of the Cornubian batholith in southwest England and the location of another granite outcrop called the Haig Fras. The dotted line shows the area of negative gravity anomalies associated with these batholiths due to their relatively low density compared to average continental crust. The lines represents the 20 mGal Bouguer anomaly.

The Cornubian batholith is a large mass of granite rock, formed about 280 million years ago, which lies beneath much of Cornwall and Devon in the South West Peninsula of England. The main exposed masses of granite are seen at Dartmoor, Bodmin Moor, St Austell, Carnmenellis, Land's End and the Isles of Scilly. The intrusion is associated with significant quantities of minerals, particularly cassiterite, an ore of tin which has been mined since about 2000 BC. Other minerals include china clay and ores of copper, lead, zinc and tungsten.

It takes its name from Cornubia, the Medieval Latin name for Cornwall.

== Extent and geometry ==
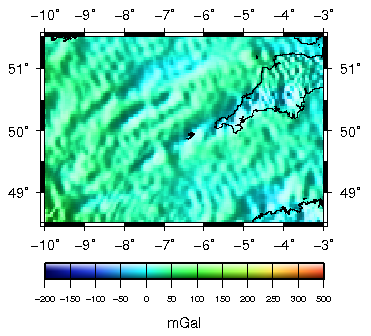
Bouguer gravity anomaly map over southwestern Britain showing the linear negative anomalies associated with the Cornubian batholith and the Haig Fras granite

A batholith is a large mass of intrusive rock formed from the crystallization of molten rock beneath the Earth's surface (magma). From gravity and magnetic geophysical data, the batholith is interpreted to extend from about 8°W, more than 100 km southwest of the Isles of Scilly, to the eastern edge of Dartmoor. The negative gravity anomaly, caused by the relatively low density of the granites compared to average continental crust, is linear and trends WSW-ENE, parallel with that associated with the Haig Fras granite.

The shape of the batholith and the relationship between the individual plutons and the main mass of the granite remained entirely speculative until gravity data began to be used to constrain the thickness and shape of the batholith by modelling. The initial work by Martin Bott suggested that the batholith had an overall trapezoidal shape with a base to the batholith at about 10–12 km. However, current understanding of granite pluton shape suggest that most are either laccolithic or lopolithic. Comparisons with other examples would suggest that the thicknesses of the individual plutons would be in the range 3–5 km, based on their outcrop widths. The volume of the batholith was estimated in 1989 to be around 68,000 cubic kilometres.

== Formation ==
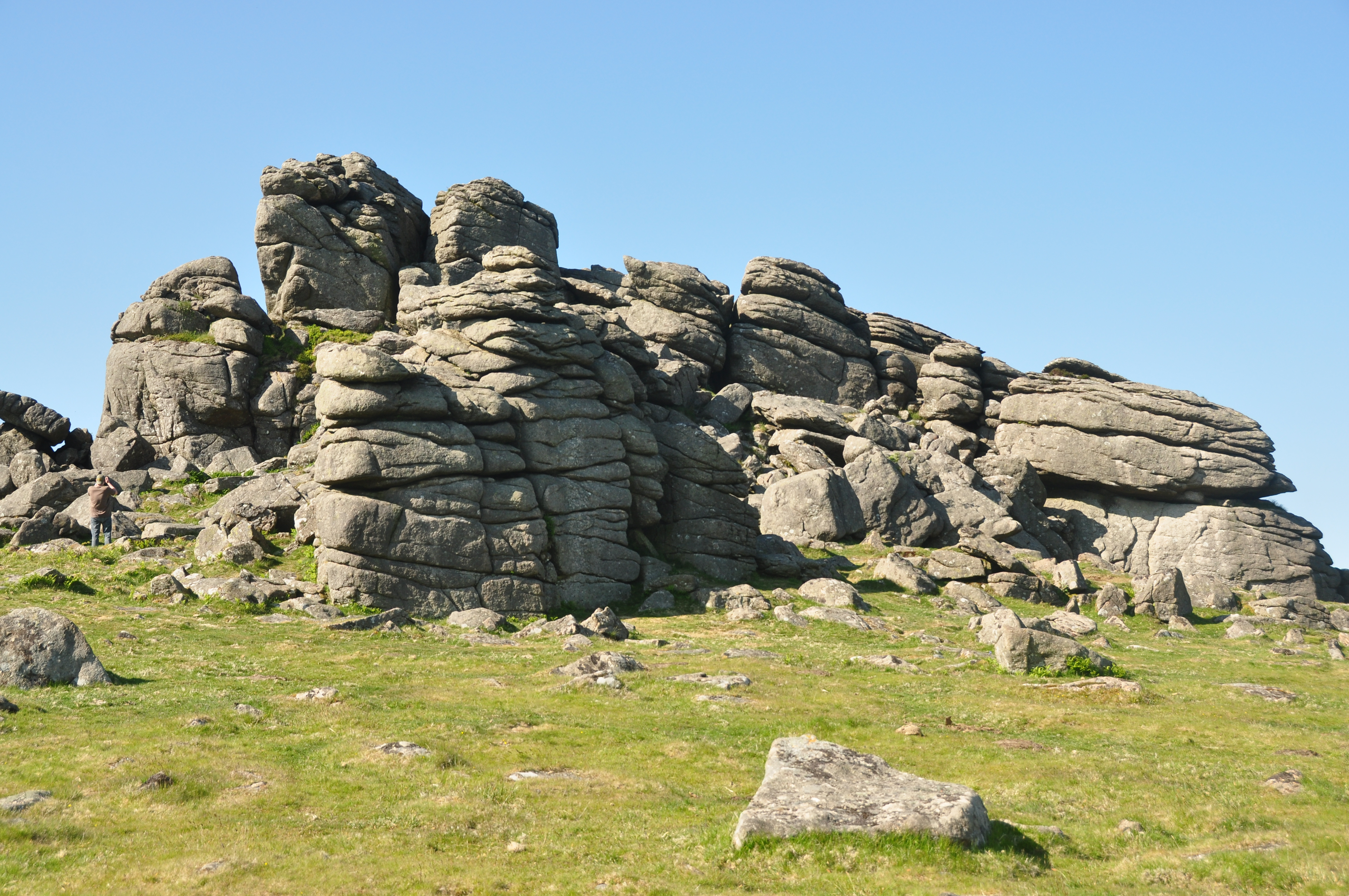
Hound Tor on Dartmoor showing horizontal and vertical joints in the granite

The Cornubian batholith formed during the Early Permian period, from about 300 to 275 Ma (million years ago) at a late stage in the mountain-building event known as the Variscan orogeny as a suite of late orogenic granites. It has been suggested that stretching of the Earth's crust (crustal extension) allowed the granitic magmas to move to higher levels in the crust. Evidence from neodymium and strontium isotopes suggests that the magmas that formed the batholith were mainly the result of partial melting of the lower crust with a minor component of basaltic magma from a mantle source. This lower crustal source is likely to have consisted of both metasedimentary and metavolcanic rocks, of Proterozoic age (2500 million to 539 million years old).

As the molten rock cooled to around 1000 Celsius it solidified and crystallised and fractures along vertical joints formed. Over time the slate and sandstone rocks covering the granite were eroded exposing the granite in areas such as Dartmoor and Bodmin Moor. The granite also expanded and horizontal joints were formed. These joints are most clearly seen on exposed pieces of rock such as the Tors of Dartmoor and Bodmin Moor. As the granite erodes further, blocks of eroded granite known as clitter are left.

=== Timing ===
An approximate age of emplacement for the Cornubian batholith was known before radiometric dating methods became commonplace, from the observed relationships with the sedimentary rocks – both those which formed before the intrusion and those which were laid down after it. The youngest rocks into which the granites intrude are the Carboniferous Crackington and Bealsmill formations of Namurian to lower Westphalian age. This provides a lower bound for the timing of granite emplacement of about 310 Ma.

The earliest instance of granitic clasts (fragments of the granite which have weathered away and become part of a new sedimentary rock) in younger sedimentary sequences is from the Late Permian St. Cyres beds. This gives an upper bound of about 250 Ma.

The inferred age of emplacement from this evidence of Late Carboniferous to Early Permian has been confirmed by radiometric dating, although it has shown that the individual intrusions were emplaced over a significant time interval. The earliest dated major intrusion is the Carnmenellis pluton at 293.1±3 Ma. The youngest dated granite is the southern lobe of the Land's End pluton, intruded at 274.5±1.4 Ma. The earliest recorded magmatic activity is the intrusion of the small Hemerdon pluton on the southwestern flank of the Dartmoor pluton at 298.3±2.3 Ma. There is no apparent systematic variation in age of plutons compared to their position within the batholith. This suggests that the batholith grew by the coalescence of a series of separate intrusions over a period of about 25 Ma.

=== Mechanism of emplacement ===
As with all large intrusive bodies, the method by which the batholith's plutons were emplaced is a matter of debate, due to the space problem of adding such large masses to the upper crust. Four main mechanisms have been proposed; stoping, diapirism, extensional faulting and uplift of the overlying country rock over a laccolithic sill with a relatively small vertical dyke feeder.

Evidence for a stoping mechanism has been described locally from the margin of the Tregonning intrusion, where a series of intrusive sheets extend out from the roof zone of the intrusion into the country-rock. Although the Land's End pluton was once thought to have a diapiric origin, its emplacement is now interpreted to have been accommodated by fault movements during regional extension.

== Plutons ==
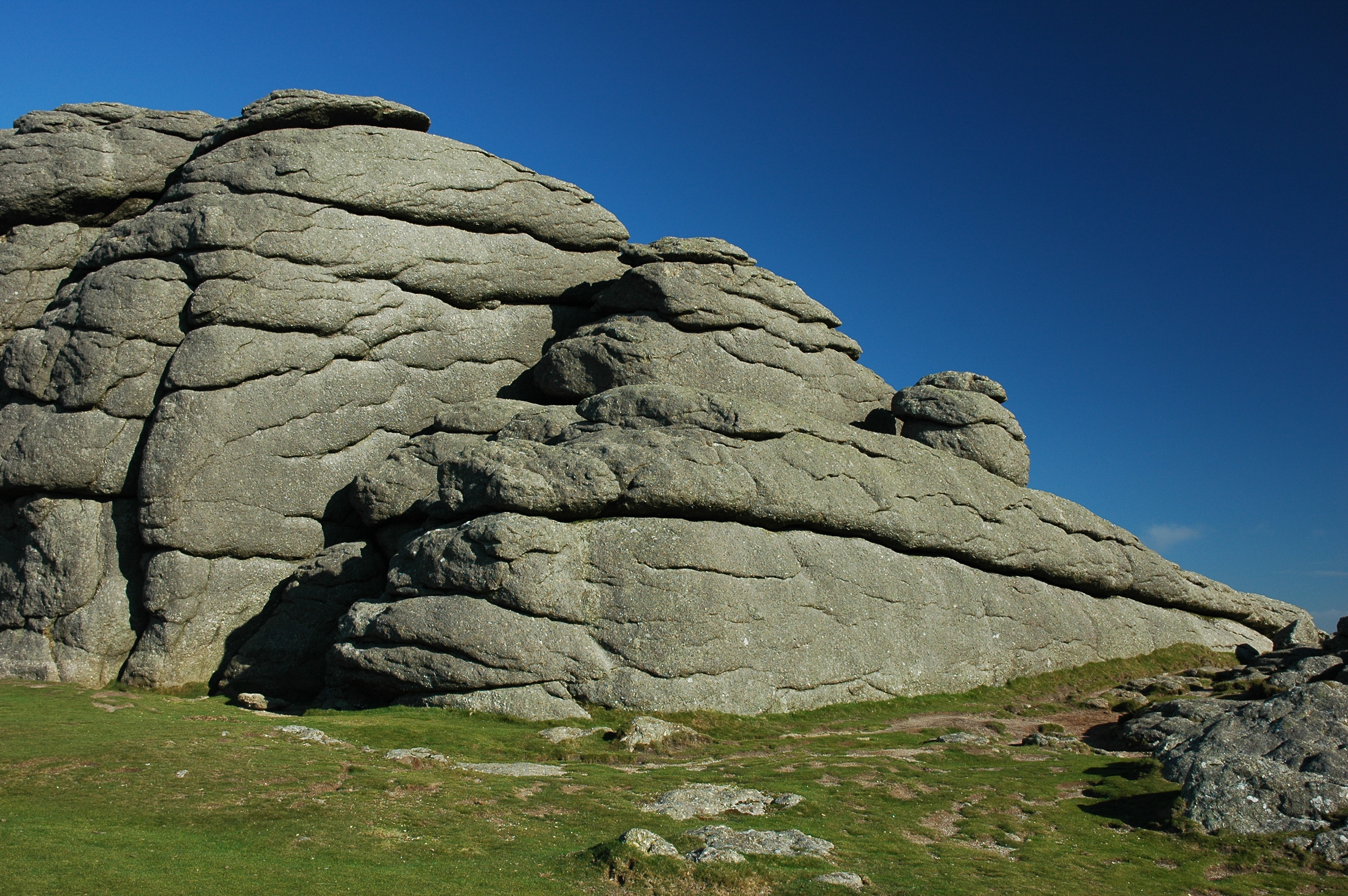
Granite at Haytor on Dartmoor

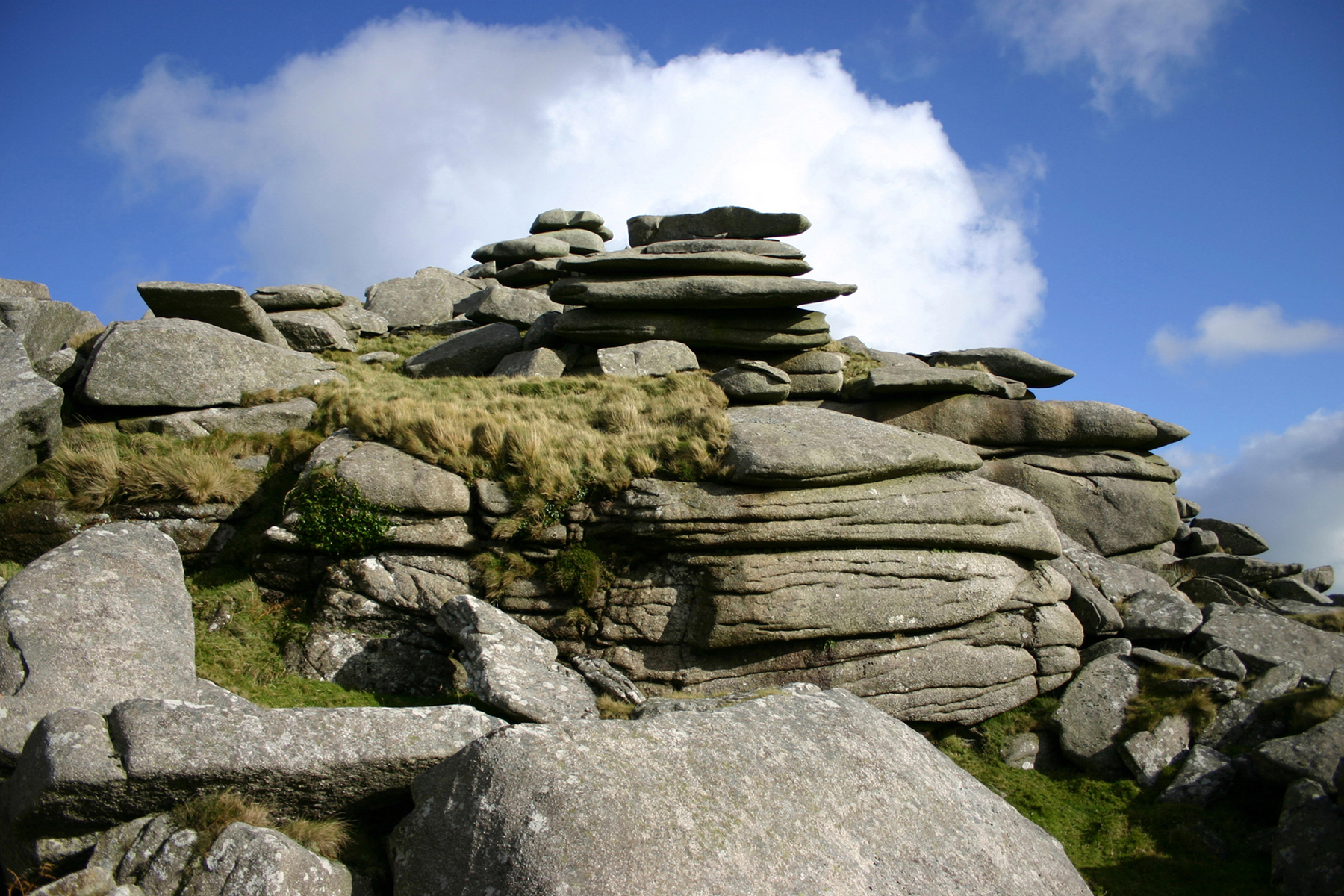
Granite at Rough Tor on Bodmin Moor

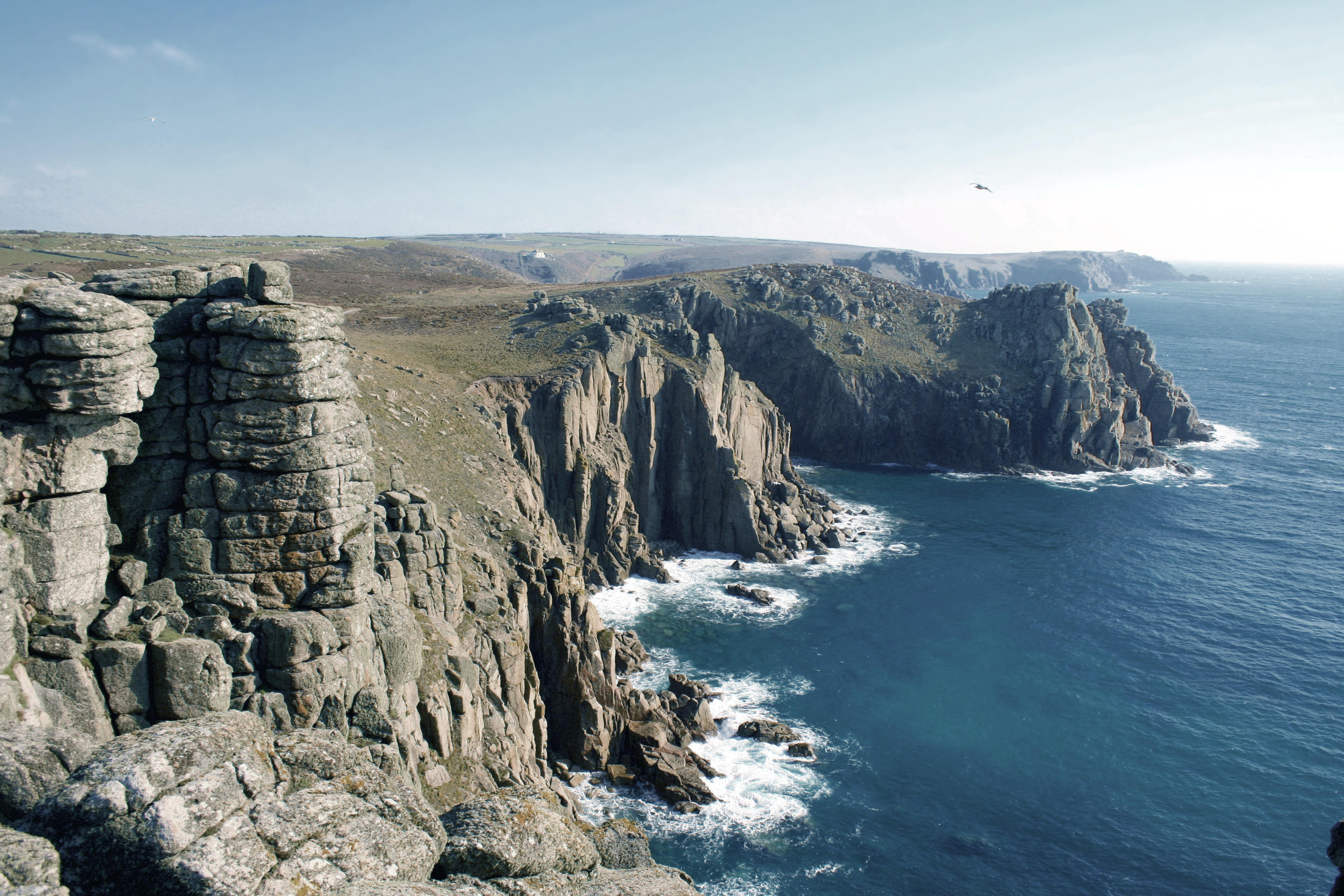
Granite outcrop at Land's End

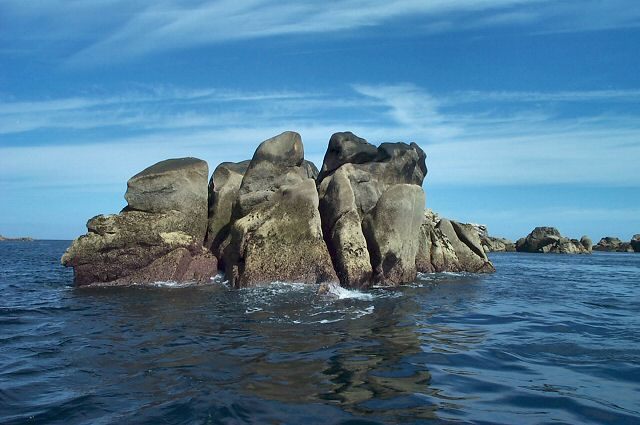
Granite at Trenemene, part of the Western Rocks, Isles of Scilly

The individual plutons that comprise the Cornubian Batholith can be broadly subdivided into five main lithologies: Two mica, Muscovite, Biotite, Tourmaline and Topaz granites, each named for their distinguishing mineral(s). The two-mica and muscovite granites are older, and can be found in the Carnmenellis, Bodmin and Isles of Scilly, whereas the younger biotite and tourmaline granites are found within the Land's End, St. Austell and Dartmoor plutons. Topaz granites outcrop within the Tregonning, Land's End and St Austell plutons.

=== Dartmoor ===
This is the largest exposed area of granite which also forms the easternmost development of the batholith. The granite consists of two main types, coarse-grained granite with abundant large alkali feldspar megacrysts and coarse-grained granite with few megacrysts. To the southwest there is an area of coarse-grained granite with small megacrysts and several small exposures of fine-grained granite, particularly in the southeastern part of the outcrop. Interpretation of the gravity field over this pluton suggests that it is sheet-like with a thickness of nearly 10 km, and a root at its southern end extending down to about 17 km depth, which may represent the conduit that carried the magma to shallow crustal levels. It appears to have been intruded along the interface between Devonian and Carboniferous rocks. Uranium-lead dating of Monazite from this intrusion gives emplacement ages of 278.2±0.8 Ma and 280.4±1.2 Ma.

=== Bodmin Moor ===
The Bodmin Moor pluton consists mainly of coarse-grained granite with abundant small megacrysts. Towards the centre and the western margin of the outcrop there are smaller bodies of fine-grained granite. Gravity data suggest that this pluton is in the form of a south-southeastward thickening wedge, reaching a maximum of about 7 km. Monazite from this pluton gives an emplacement age of 291.4±0.8 Ma.

=== St Austell ===
The St Austell pluton consists of coarse-grained megacrystic granite with large megacrysts at the western and eastern ends of the outcrop. The central part of the pluton is also coarse-grained but lacks the megacrysts. Between the central megacryst poor and the large megacryst rich coarse-grained granites at the western end, a medium-grained granite is developed with lithium-mica. Smaller bodies of fine-grained granite are found in the central part of the outcrop and at the western end. Gravity data indicate that this pluton is wedge-shaped similar to that at Bodmin. Monazite gives an emplacement age of 281.8±0.4 Ma for this pluton.

=== Carnmenellis ===
The Carnmenellis pluton and the smaller intrusion of Carn Brea appear to be part of a single intrusive body. The central part of the Carnmenellis outcrop is a medium-grained granite with few megacrysts. The bulk of the main outcrop and the Carn Brea and Carn Marth masses consist of coarse-grained megacrystic granite with small megacrysts. Small bodies of fine-grained granite are found towards the west of the Carnemellis outcrop. The shape of this pluton is interpreted to be a sheet about 3 km thick with a near central root extending down to about 7 km depth. Boreholes at Rosemanowes that extend to over 2.5 km deep have shown very little variation in the petrographic composition of the granite with depth in this pluton. Monazite gives an emplacement age of 293.7±0.6 Ma for this pluton.

=== Tregonning-Godolphin ===
The Tregonning Granite and Godolphin Granite are two distinct granite bodies on the southern coast of Cornwall. The Tregonning Granite is mainly a medium-grained lithium-mica granite with a body of fine-grained granite developed towards the northwest of the outcrop. It has a unique chemistry and differs from the granite found within the Carnmenellis and Land's End granites, likely forming in a different manner. The Godolphin Granite is mineralogically and chemically similar to the nearby Carnmenellis Granite, although is finer grained.

=== Land's End ===
The Land's End pluton is mainly a coarse-grained granite with abundant large megacrysts. There is an area in the centre which is poor in megacrysts and there are several small and medium-sized masses of fine-grained granite throughout the outcrop. Dating has been carried out on xenotime and monazite samples, from a fine-grained granite and the main coarse-grained granite respectively. These give emplacement ages of 279.3±0.4 Ma for the fine-grained granite and 274.8±0.5 Ma for the main phase granite. This difference is consistent with fine-grained granite being a roof-pendant to the coarse-grained main phase granite intrusion.

=== Isles of Scilly ===
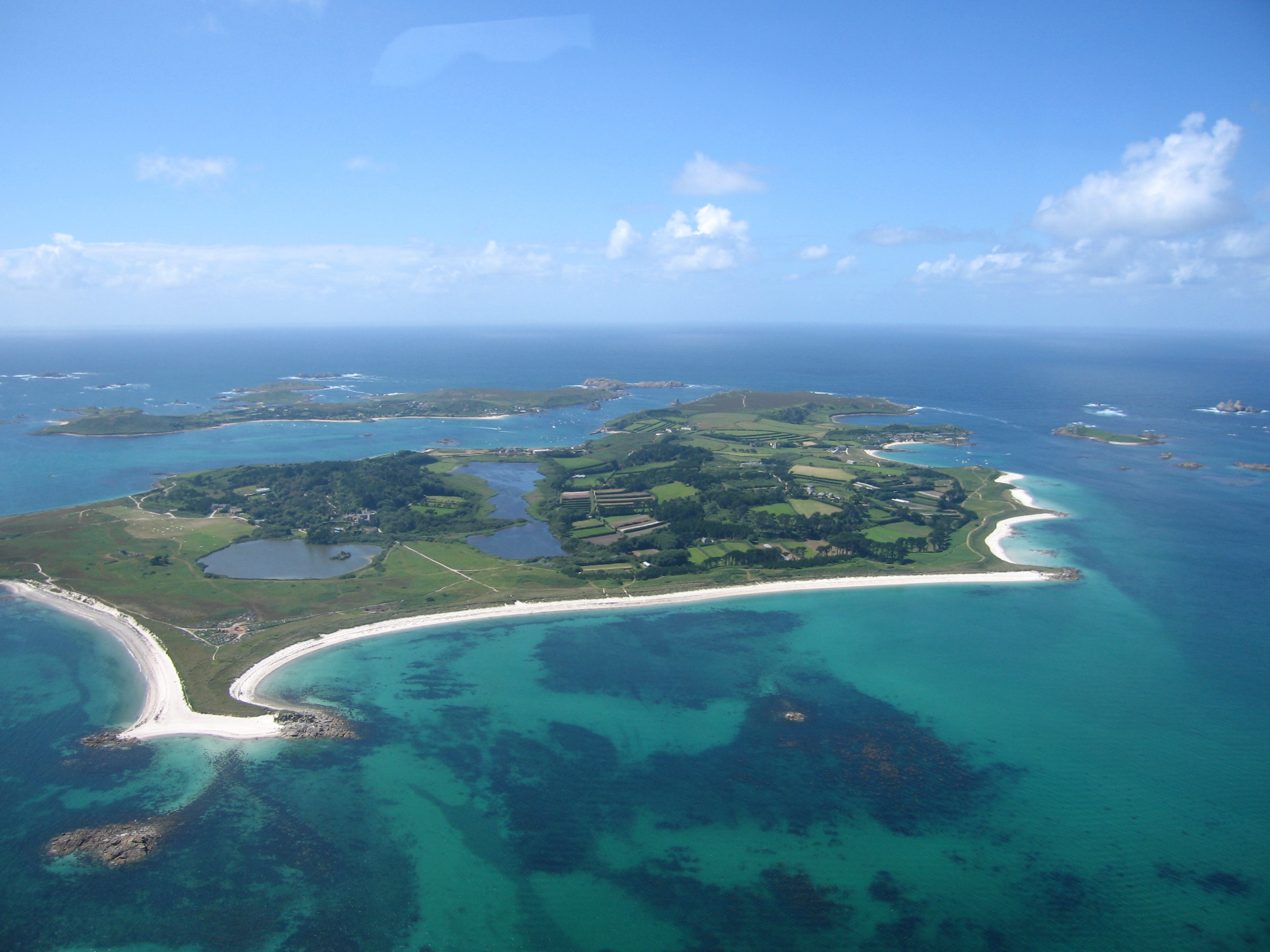
Looking across Tresco, the second-largest of the Scilly Isles

The Isles of Scilly all have granite bedrock. The dominant rock type is a megacrystic biotite granite, although the megacrysts are relatively small. In the centre of the pluton a medium-grained granite is developed with few megacrysts, more tourmaline and less biotite than the main variety. Monazite from this pluton suggest an emplacement age of 290.3±0.6 Ma.

=== Haig Fras ===
This submarine outcrop, 45 km in length, lies 95 km northwest of the Scilly Isles, rising at one point to 38 m below sea level. In contrast to most granites of the Cornubian batholith the granites here are fine to medium-grained and generally lack megacrysts. It was intruded at 277 Ma and is considered most likely to be a separate but related intrusive body that runs parallel to the Cornubian batholith.

=== Other intrusions ===
Minor granitic intrusions are present throughout the peninsula. In some cases granitic bodies have been recognised from the mineralization above them, even if the intrusion itself has not been encountered.

A series of minor intrusions are found within the country rock and the granites themselves. Common types are pegmatites, aplites and elvans.

== Mineralogy and chemistry of the granite and other rocks ==
=== Granite ===
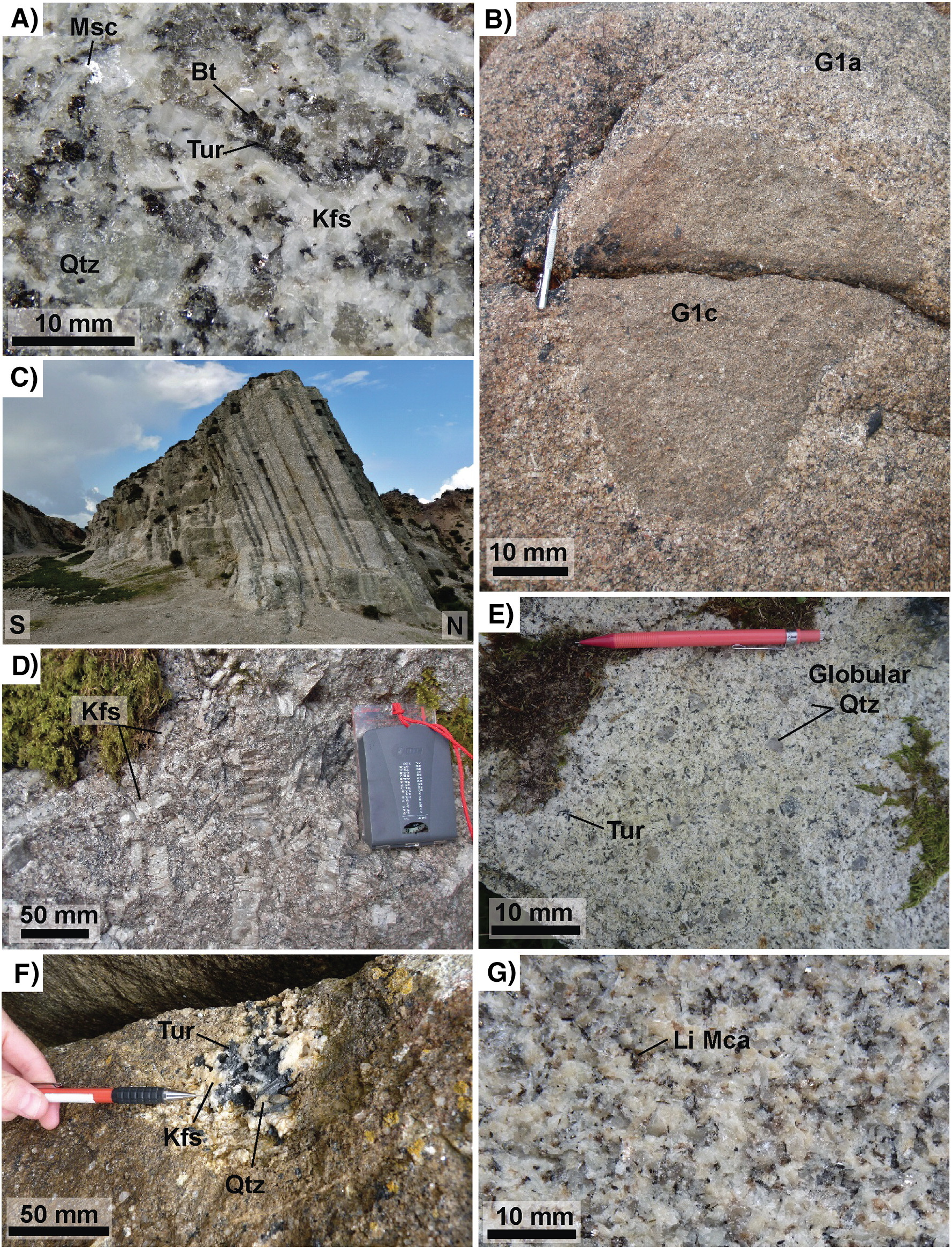
Field photographs of Cornubian Batholith granites. A – Typical G1a granite with orthoclase phenocrysts (< 25 mm) from the Carnmenellis Granite. B – Enclave of G1c granite within G1a granite, St. Agnes, Isles of Scilly Granite. C – Cligga G2 Granite with sheeted W greisen veins. D – Coarse-grained porphyritic G3a granite with abundant orthoclase phenocrysts (> 25 mm) from the Dartmoor Granite. E – Globular quartz G4b granite from Carn Dean Quarry, Land's End Granite. F – Pegmatitic pocket dominantly comprising tourmaline, orthoclase and quartz within G3a granite, Land's End Granite. G – Typical topaz (G5) granite texture, equigranular with abundant Li mica, Tregonning Granite. Mineral name abbreviations: Kfs = potassium feldspar, Bt= biotite, Msc = muscovite, Qtz = quartz, Tur = tourmaline, Mca = mica.

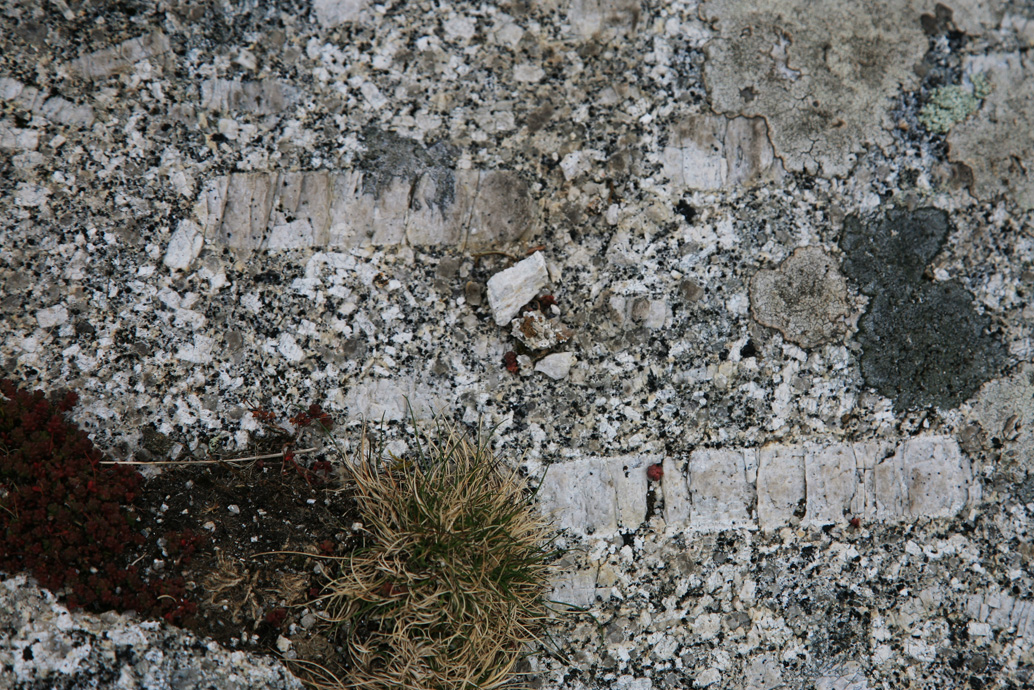
Coarse-grained granite with large alkali feldspar megacrysts, Dartmoor (photo by Ian Stimpson)

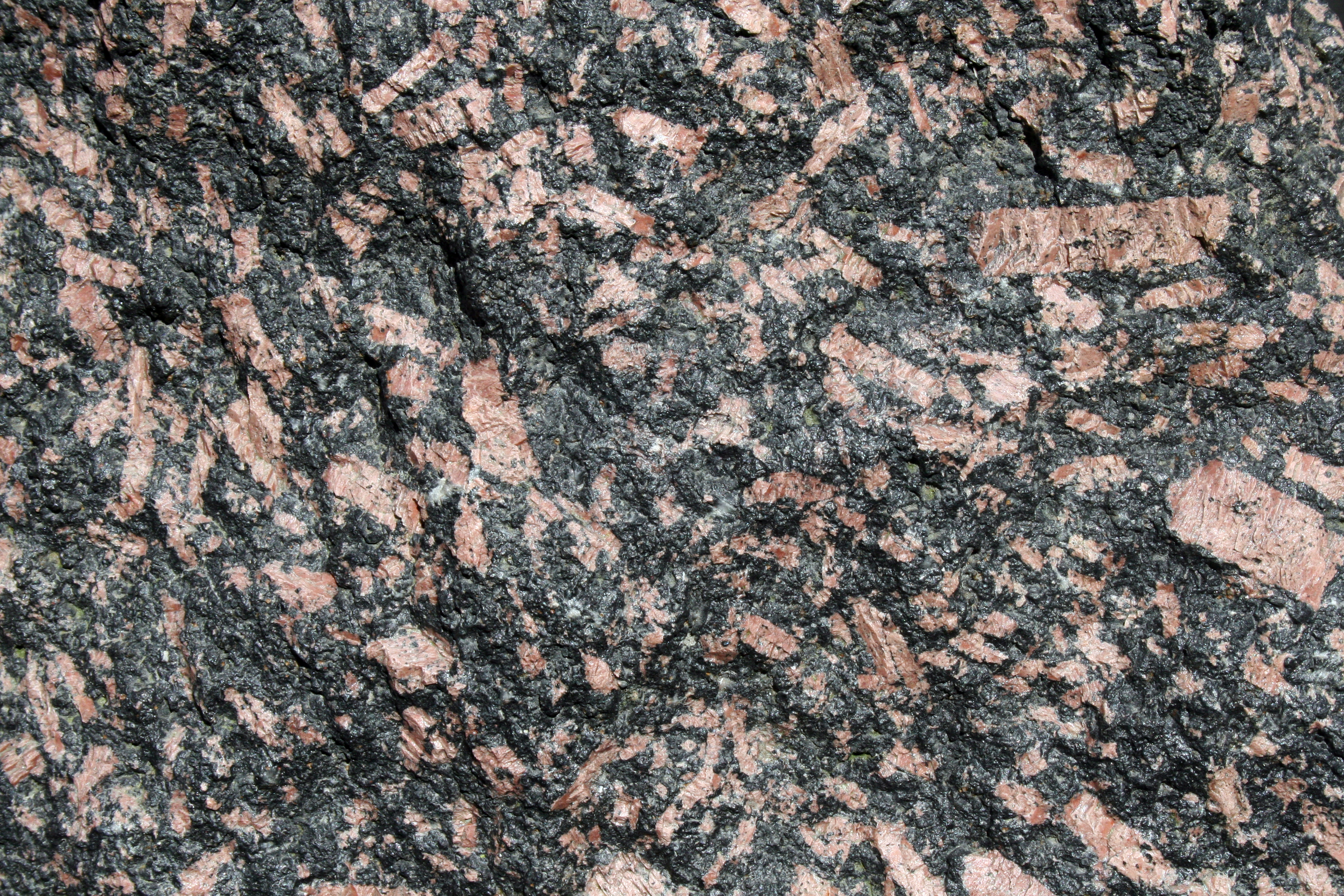
Luxullianite, a tourmalinized granite

The main rock forming the batholith is granite, which formed when magma cooled slowly, covered by 2–3,000 metres of slate and sandstone. The slow cooling gave time for crystals to form in the granite which are large enough to see with the naked eye, giving it a granular appearance. These grains are mainly of quartz, feldspar and biotite. The granite is generally coarse grained and in some places very coarse-grained, or pegmatitic (grains larger than 3 cm). Large phenocrysts, several centimetres long, of K-feldspar, are a distinctive feature.

The chemistry and mineralogy of the granites vary from one location to another, but they are all classified on the Chappell & White classification as being S-type, which means that they are ultimately derived from sedimentary rock protolith.

==== Mineralogy ====
The Cornubian intrusions are mostly made up of two-mica granite (containing both muscovite and biotite). Li-mica granite forms a less common type found only in the St. Austell pluton and some smaller intrusions. Many of the granites contain large alkali feldspar phenocrysts. In some locations the original granite has been modified to form a tourmaline-bearing granite called luxullianite. This tourmalinisation occurred during the late stages of cooling of the granite, as feldspar and mica were partly replaced by tourmaline.

==== Chemistry ====
The two-mica granites are strongly peraluminous – they have a high ratio of aluminium oxide to sodium and potassium oxides. They also have a low ratio of sodium to potassium and overall high level of alkalis. The granites are highly enriched in lithium, boron, caesium and uranium and moderately so in fluorine, gallium, germanium, rubidium, tin, tantalum, tungsten and thallium. Given the overall chemistry, the levels of phosphorus are also high. Strontium, barium and the elements from scandium to zinc are relatively depleted. This chemistry is consistent with partial melting of a source consisting of greywackes (a variety of sandstone). The conditions under which the melts formed is modelled to be temperature of 770 °C and a confining pressure of 50 MPa.

Differences in chemistry have been identified between an earlier group of plutons (Isles of Scilly, Carnmenellis & Bodmin Moor) and a later group (Land's End, St Austell & Dartmoor). The early group of granites contain more aluminium than the later set and have steeper slopes on plots of cerium against yttrium. The later group contain more common basic microgranite xenoliths.

The granites are generally rich in ammonium compared to average granites worldwide. There is also considerable variation between the individual plutons, with an average of 11 ppm for Dartmoor compared to 94 ppm for Bodmin Moor. The concentration of ammonium in these granites correlates well with both their initial ^{87}Sr/^{86}Sr ratios and their peraluminosity. The relatively high ammonium content is interpreted to indicate that the granites were derived from a sedimentary protolith, or have been contaminated from such a source after emplacement to high crustal levels.

=== Associated metamorphic and metasomatic rocks ===
Around the edges of many of the plutons the country rocks have been transformed by heat in a process known as contact metamorphism. The effects of this can be seen up to a distance of 4 miles from the granite in an area called the metamorphic aureole. The effect of this process depends on the type of rocks which were heated and their distance from the intrusion. Fine grained sedimentary rocks were transformed into hornfels and minerals such as amphibole, pyroxene. At greater distances from the plutons, the only evidence of metamorphism is spotting in these rocks. Garnet developed in calcareous rocks as well as amphibole and pyroxene. The metamorphism of greenstones has generally led to the formation of hornblende-plagioclase rocks.

A feature of the granites of the batholith is the high concentrations of volatile components. Fluids rich in these have strongly affected the country rock and locally the granites themselves in a process called metasomatism. The first phase recognised is alkali metasomatism (where alkaline components are enhanced), which occurred within and at the margins of the granite. Potassium–metasomatism was followed by sodium–metasomatism. Finally acid metasomatism (enrichment of acid components and depletion of alkalis) took place leading to the formation of greisen and tourmalines.

== Mineral formation ==
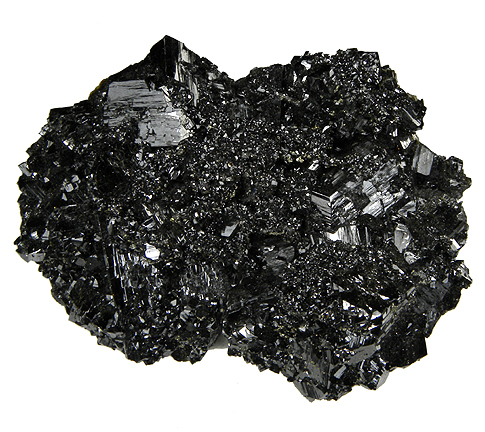
Cassiterite (tin ore) from Botallack Mine, St Just

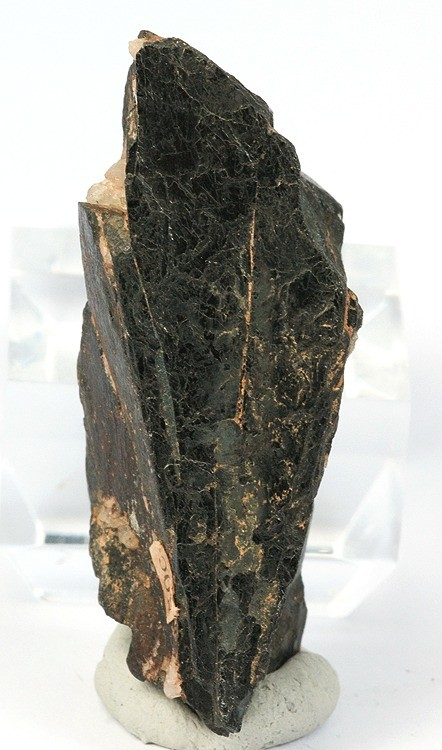
Wolframite from the Camborne-Redruth-St. Day District of Cornwall

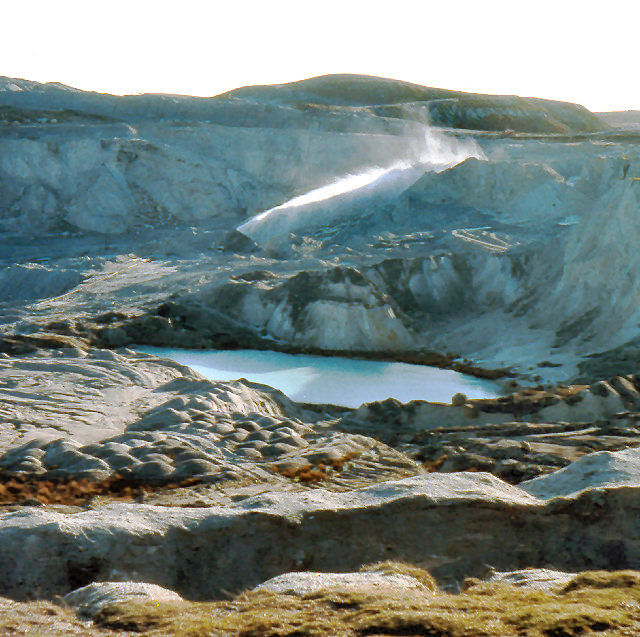
Lee Moor china clay pit showing hydraulic mining in progress

Large mineral deposits are found in the vicinity of the batholith and these have been mined for thousands of years. The area has been famous for its tin since about 2000 BC. The minerals formed when fluids escaped along fractures in the hot granite as it cooled and are typically found in veins or washed into streams to form alluvium. The mineral deposits are associated with multiple lodes and fractures that dip steeply and cut across both the granites and the country rocks. The ore-bearing lodes are up to several kilometres long and are 0.5 to 3m wide on average.

=== Stages of mineralization ===
There are four recognised stages of mineralization associated with different conditions as the granite slowly cooled. Each stage is associated with different temperatures, economic deposits of different metals and different gangue minerals. The first three stages have been connected to the intrusion and cooling of the batholith, while the fourth stage may have been driven by the heat production associated with radioactive materials in the granite.

Stage 1 – exoskarns
The earliest phase of mineralization occurred during the intrusion of the granite. Hot water from the magma which was rich in silica, iron, aluminium, and magnesium mixed and dissolved shales and metabasalts, and converted them into exoskarns in a process called metasomatism, where the chemical composition of rocks is changed by hot water or other fluids. Typical minerals formed at this time include garnet, pyroxene, epidote, chlorine-rich amphiboles, malayaite, vesuvianite, siderite and axinite. The skarns may contain economic amounts of tin, copper, iron and arsenic. These minerals were formed at about the same time as the crystallisation of the pluton they are associated with. Temperatures associated with this stage were 375 – 450 °C.

Stage 2 – greisen bordered veins and tourmaline veins and breccias
The second recognised phase of mineralization involved the granite being transformed by high-temperature late magmatic fluids rich in volatiles to form greisen and tourmaline. Veins of cassiterite (tin oxide) and wolframite (a mineral containing iron, manganese and tungsten) are found associated with the greisens, the former deposited by high salinity, low CO_{2}, fluids and the latter by low salinity, high CO_{2} fluids. Muscovites within the greisens give cooling ages similar to magmatic muscovites in the relevant granite.

Stage 3 – the main phase of mineralization
The third and main phase of mineralization occurred at a later stage, and at lower temperatures (200 – 400 °C) as the granite intrusion cooled. Fluids circulating within the country rock leached out tin, copper and arsenic and deposited them in veins which generally lie on an east–west axis. The typical fill of these veins is quartz-tourmaline-chlorite-sulfide-fluorite, with tin, copper, lead, zinc, iron and arsenic sulfides. This mineralization is 25–40 Ma later than the intrusion age for the Carnmenellis pluton. These veins are the main economically useful source of minerals.

Stage 4 – crosscourses
The fourth and final stage of mineralization was the lowest temperature phase (100 – 170 °C) and is associated with veins containing multiple metallic elements (lead, zinc, silver and uranium). The veins lie on a north–south or northwest–southeast axis and are known as 'crosscourses' because they cross-cut the earlier E-W trending veins. Gangue minerals include quartz, barite and fluorite. Studies on quartz fluid inclusions have shown that the fluids causing this stage are similar in composition to deep sedimentary brines which are rich in sodium, calcium and chlorine. This brine came from Permo-Triassic sedimentary rocks that once covered the entire area. These rocks are still preserved in the Southwest Approaches to the English Channel. Evidence of seawater influence suggests that the mineralization did not start until the Late Triassic marine incursion at the earliest. The high heat flow from the granites helped drive fluid circulation.

=== China clay ===
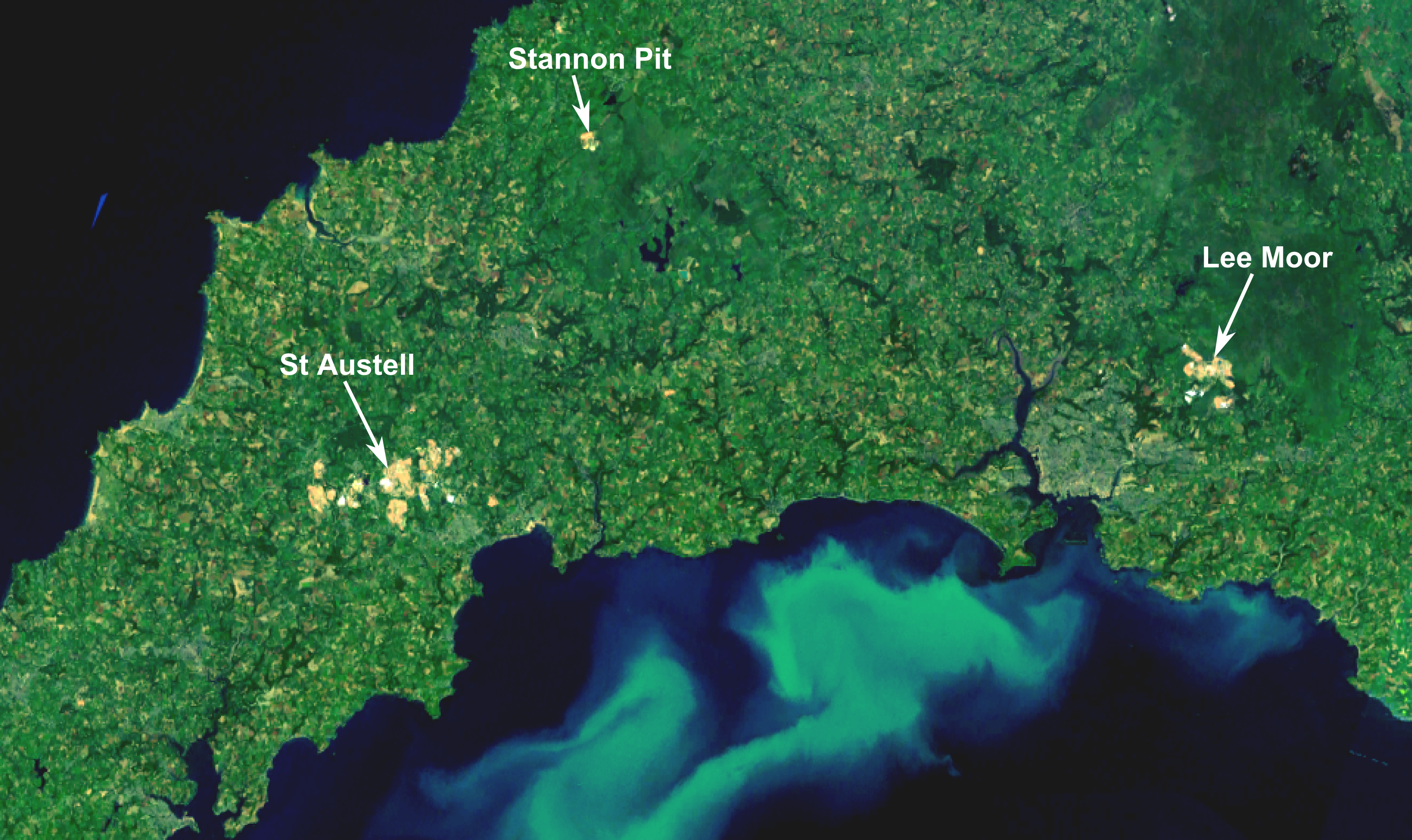
Satellite image of south-west England showing lighter areas that mark the location of china clay workings (labelled)

Large economic deposits of china clay are found in places across the south-west peninsula, in particular Lee Moor on the western edge of Dartmoor and the St Austell district. The china clay was formed by the alteration of feldspars in a process known as kaolinization. There is still debate about the origin and age of these deposits but they are commonly thought to arise from the circulation of meteoric water (water from rain or snow) at a late stage during cooling of the batholith. One theory is that the kaolinization resulted from intense supergene weathering in a tropical to warm climate during the Cretaceous to Cenozoic, based on studies of D/H and ^{18}O/^{16}O ratios.

== Sources ==
- Selwood, E. B.; Durrance, E. M.; Bristow, C. M. (1998). The Geology of Cornwall. University of Exeter Press. ISBN 978-0-85989-432-6.
