= Haig Fras =

Rocky outcrop near Cornwall, England

Coordinates: 50.2592°N 7.7830°W

Map of granite outcrops onshore and offshore southwest England

Haig Fras is a 45 km long submarine granitic rocky outcrop in the southern part of the Celtic Sea, lying about 95 km northwest of the Isles of Scilly. It covers an area of 356.5 square kilometres (137.6 sq mi). At one point it reaches within 38 m of the sea surface. It is protected as a Special Area of Conservation (SAC) because of the diverse fauna developed in its bedrock reef habitat. It was discovered in 1962 and named by Smith and others in 1965.

== Geology ==
The Haig Fras outcrop consists mainly of granite, forming a WSW-ENE trending elongate intrusion. The granite outcrop is surrounded by an area of Devonian-Carboniferous sedimentary rocks. Evidence from gravity data suggests that the extent of the intrusion is greater than the observed outcrop, based on its association with a linear negative gravity anomaly. It is dated at 277 Ma, Early Permian in age, within the range of intrusion ages for the granites that make up the Cornubian batholith. Although the two intrusions have the same trend and are of similar age, they are not thought to be related. In detail, three separate outcrops have been identified using a combination of radiometric data and seabed sampling. The granite is fine to medium-grained, unlike the megacrystic granite typical of the Cornubian batholith intrusions, although this may be due to the low level of sampling available. A foliated granite is locally developed as a marginal facies.

The granite is thought to be cut by a swarm of basic dykes inferred from magnetic and seismic reflection data. This swarm is interpreted to be 56 km long and 2.5 km across and at least six separate intrusive bodies have been identified. The proposed intrusions are though most likely to be of Mesozoic age.

== Fauna ==
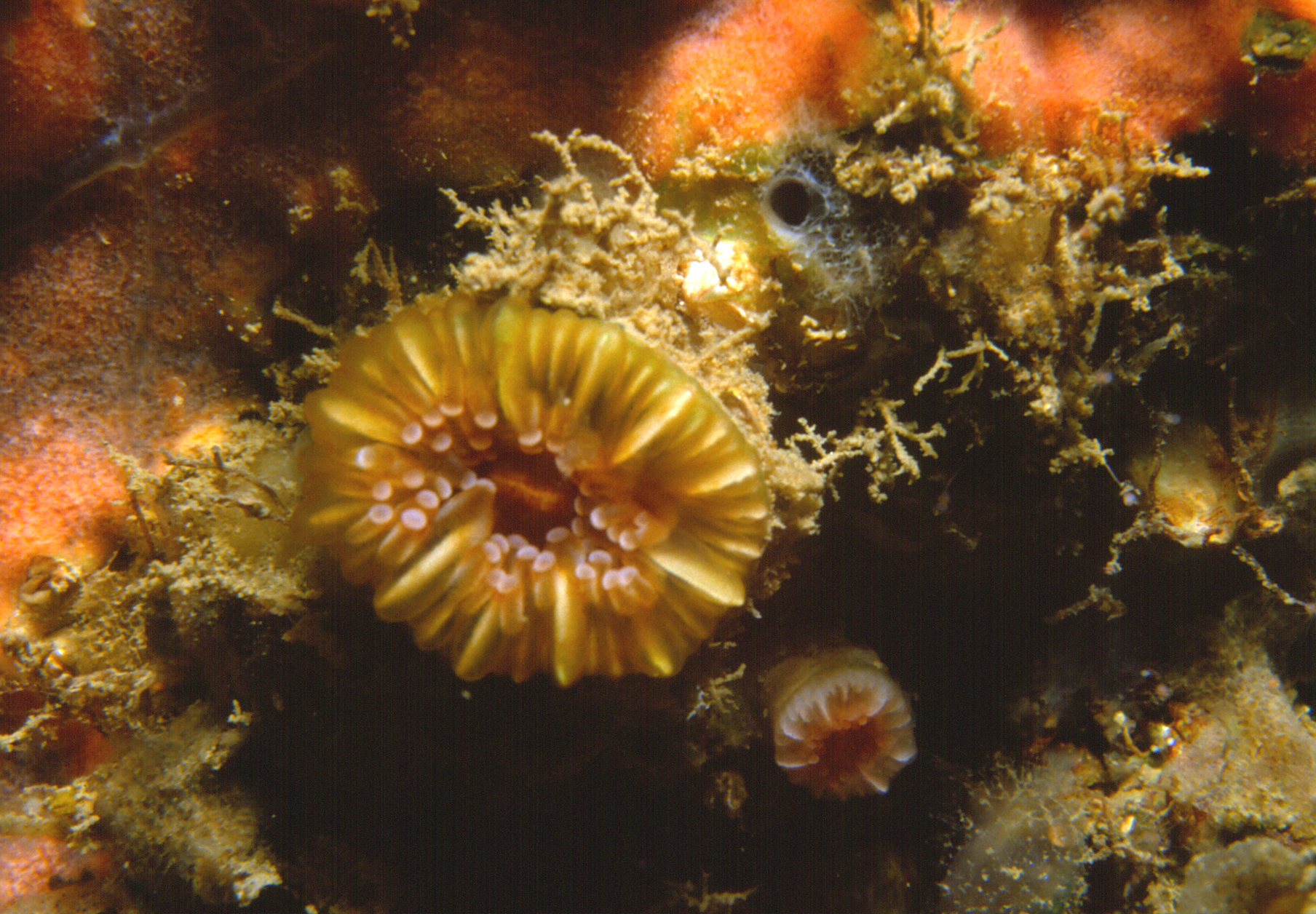
Devonshire cup corals are found at the top of the reef.

The bedrock reef at Haig Fras supports a range of fauna. Jewel anemones (Corynactis viridis) and Devonshire cup corals (Caryophyllia smithii) are found at the top of the outcrop. Encrusting sponges, crinoids and Ross coral Pentapora fascialis are found near base of the outcrop. Mobile fauna observed include urchins such as Echinus esculentus, brittle stars and the squat lobster Munida.

== Special area of conservation ==
The area of the proposed SAC is 481 square kilometres (186 sq mi), which includes a margin of 330 metres (1,080 ft) around the mapped bedrock area, derived from the maximum water depth of 110 metres (360 ft) and an assumed length to depth ratio of a fishing warp (the cable used to tow the fishing gear) of 3:1. This is intended to protect the site from potential further damage from demersal fishing. The area was first proposed in 2004 and was included in the first tranche of candidate SACs submitted to the European Commission in August 2008. It was selected on the basis of being an Annex I habitat, 1170 (reefs), in the terms of the EU Habitats Directive.
