= Meddon Moor =

Protected area in Cornwall, England

Coordinates: 50.9275°N 4.4608°W

Meddon Moor is a Site of Special Scientific Interest (SSSI) in Cornwall, England. The moor is located in the very north-eastern corner of Cornwall, on the border with Devon, within the civil parish of Morwenstow. The Devon village of Meddon lies 500 metres (1,600 ft) to the north-east of the moor.

The Meddon Moor SSSI is noted for its biodiversity, and sits on the Carboniferous Culm Measures of North Cornwall. It contains the largest single area of remaining Culm grassland in Cornwall.

== See also ==
- Meddon Green Local Nature Reserve
