= Aylesbeare Mudstone Group =

Triassic lithostratigraphic group in southwest England

- Stratigraphic range: Early Triassic
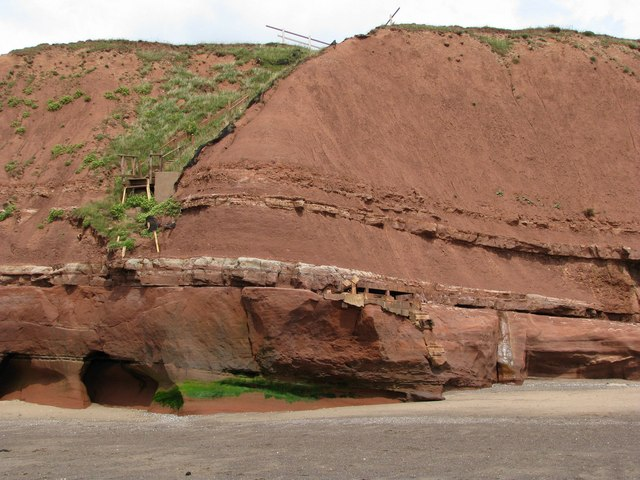
- Mudstones with layers of sandstone of the Exmouth Mudstone and Sandstone Formation east of Exmouth
- Type: Group
- Unit of: New Red Sandstone Supergroup
- Sub-units: Exmouth Mudstone and Sandstone Formation, Littleham Mudstone Formation, Clyst St Lawrence Formation
- Underlies: Budleigh Salterton Pebble Beds
- Overlies: Exeter Group
- Thickness: 400-530m

Lithology
- Primary: mudstones
- Other: sandstones, siltstones

Location
- Region: southwest
- Country: England
- Extent: east Devon, Somerset

Type section
- Named for: Aylesbeare

The Aylesbeare Mudstone Group is an early Triassic lithostratigraphic group (a sequence of rock strata) in southwest England. The name is derived from the village of Aylesbeare in east Devon. The Group comprises the Littleham Mudstone Formation, the Exmouth Mudstone and Sandstone Formation and the underlying Clyst St Lawrence Formation. The strata are exposed on the coast between Exmouth and Budleigh Salterton where the type section is defined. The rocks of the Aylesbeare Mudstone Group have also previously been known as the Aylesbeare Group and the Aylesbeare Mudstone Formation.

== Stratigraphy ==
=== Exmouth Mudstone and Sandstone Formation ===
Around 200 - 255m of silty mudstones between the coast near Exmouth north to Aylesbeare, beyond which it is not separately mapped. It includes numerous sandstone lenses which can be up to 30m thick. This sequence has been known by various names in the past including the Exmouth Sandstones, Exmouth Formation and the Exmouth Mudstone and Sandstone Member amongst others. The type section is in the coastal exposures between Exmouth and Straight Point.

=== Littleham Mudstone Formation ===
Around 200m of silty mudstone in the Exeter area rising to 275m thickness on the coast between Littleham Cove and Budleigh Salterton (type section). The formation has been mapped northwards from Littleham to the vicinity of Aylesbeare but is not separately distinguished beyond there. This sequence has previously been referred to variously as the Littleham Beds, the Littleham Formation and the Littleham Mudstones.

=== Clyst St Lawrence Formation ===
The formation comprises between 30 and 50m of sand and silt, representing weathered sandstone and siltstone, at outcrop between the east Devon hamlets of Westwood and Mutterton.
