= Meddon Green Local Nature Reserve =

Nature reserve in Devon, England

Coordinates: 50.933°N 4.452°W

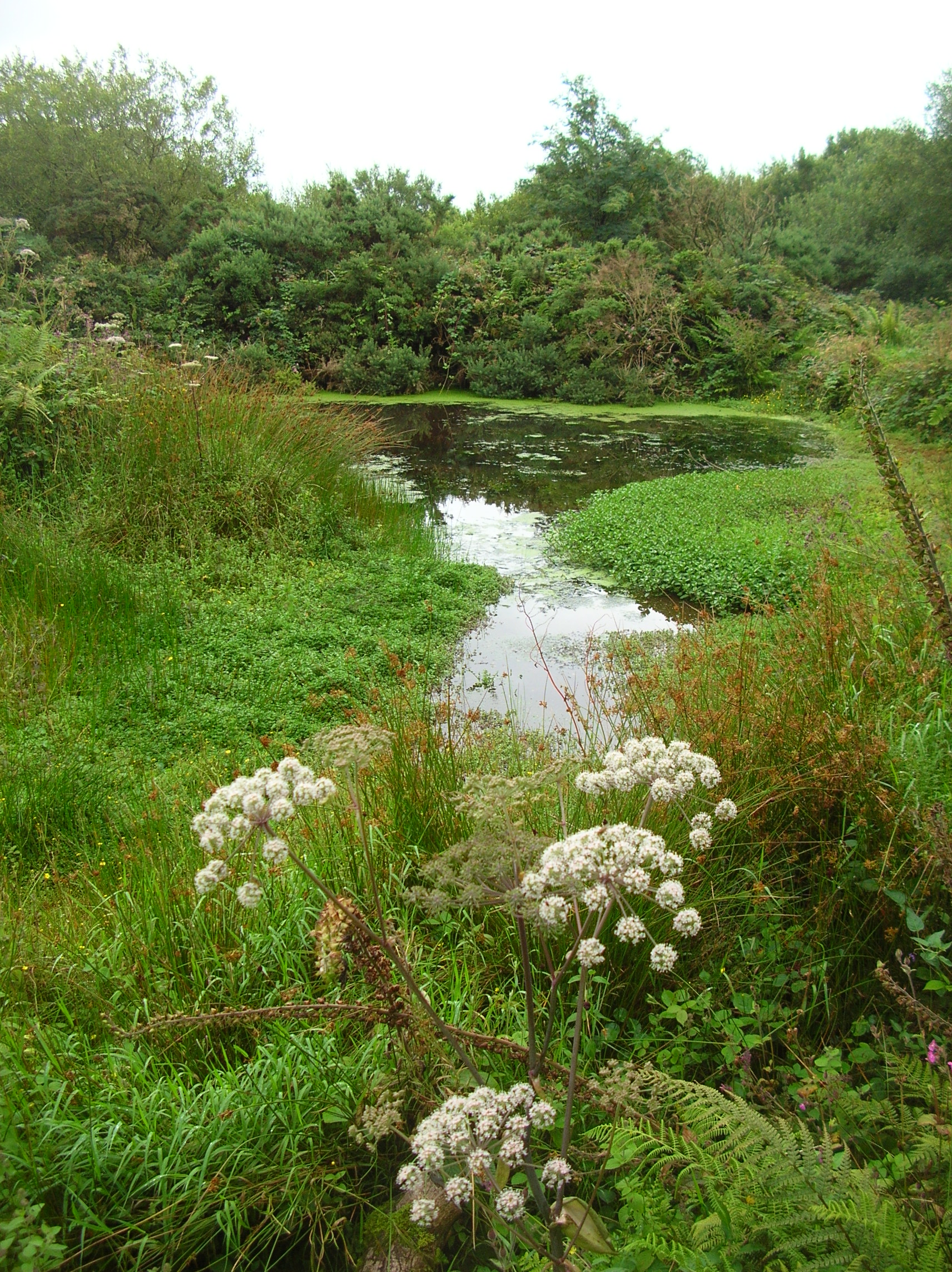
Pond at Meddon Green

Meddon Green is a 1.7 hectare (ha) Local Nature Reserve, located at Meddon, near Bideford in Devon. It consists of culm grassland surrounded by hazel coppice. The reserve is owned by Hartland Parish Council and was declared in 2007. The site contains many typical culm grassland plants including Southern Marsh Orchid and Greater Bird's-foot Trefoil.

Volunteers have cleared much willow scrub from the site prior to getting the site fenced and grazed (planned for 2009).

== See also ==
- Meddon Moor
