= Ash Hole Cavern =

Cave in Brixham, Devon, England

- Ash Hole, Berry Head Cavern
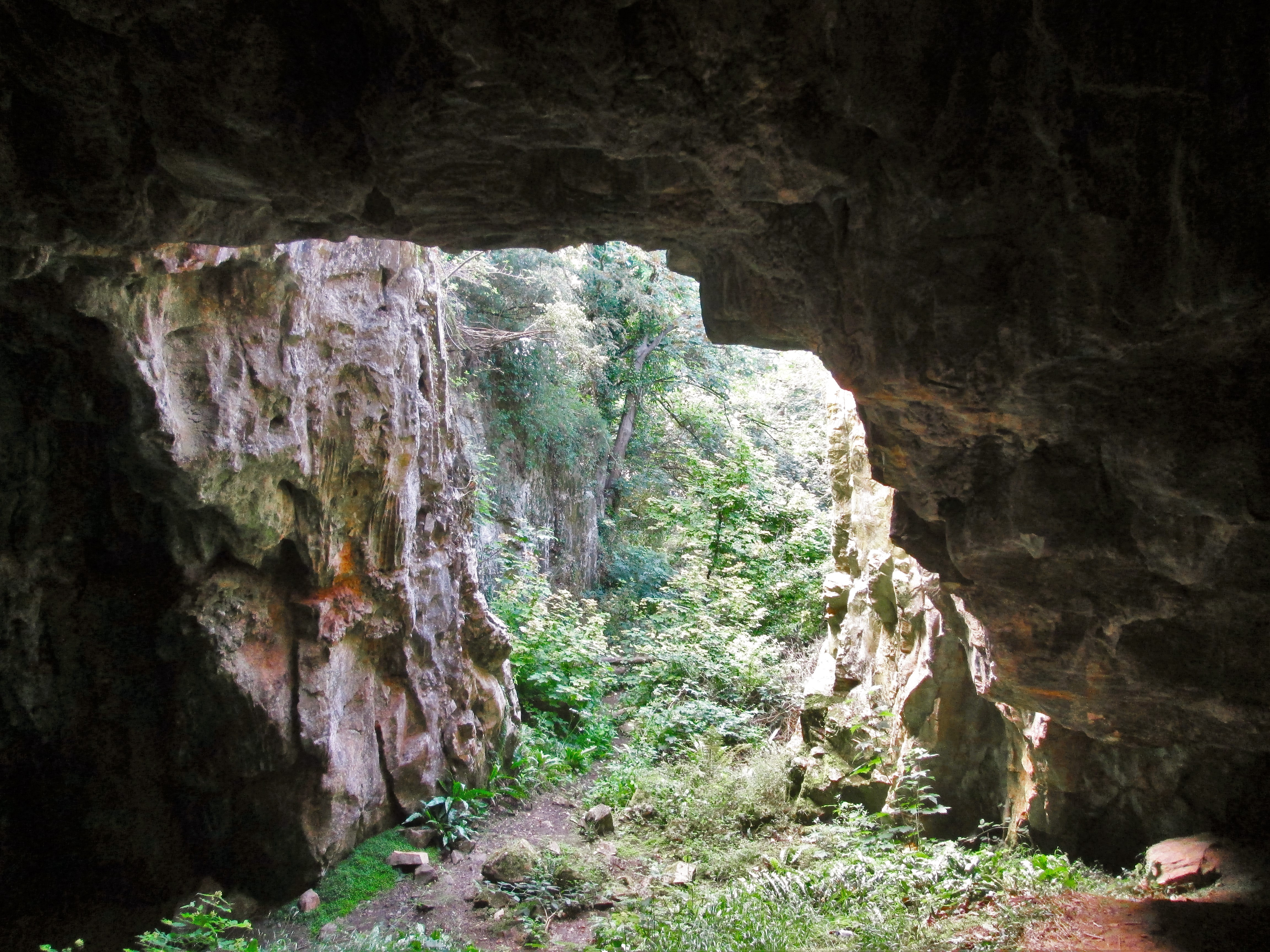
- The quarried entrance to the cave

- Location within Devon
- Location: Brixham, Devon, England
- OS grid: SX 93701 56681
- Coordinates: 50°24′01″N 3°29′49″W
- Height variation: 10.5 m (34 ft)
- Geology: Devonian Limestone
- Entrances: 2
- Access: Public

Ash Hole Cavern is a limestone cave system in Brixham, Devon, England. There is evidence of human habitation since Neolithic times, and archaeological excavations have been conducted, with several artefacts found. It has been a scheduled monument since 1966.

== Description ==
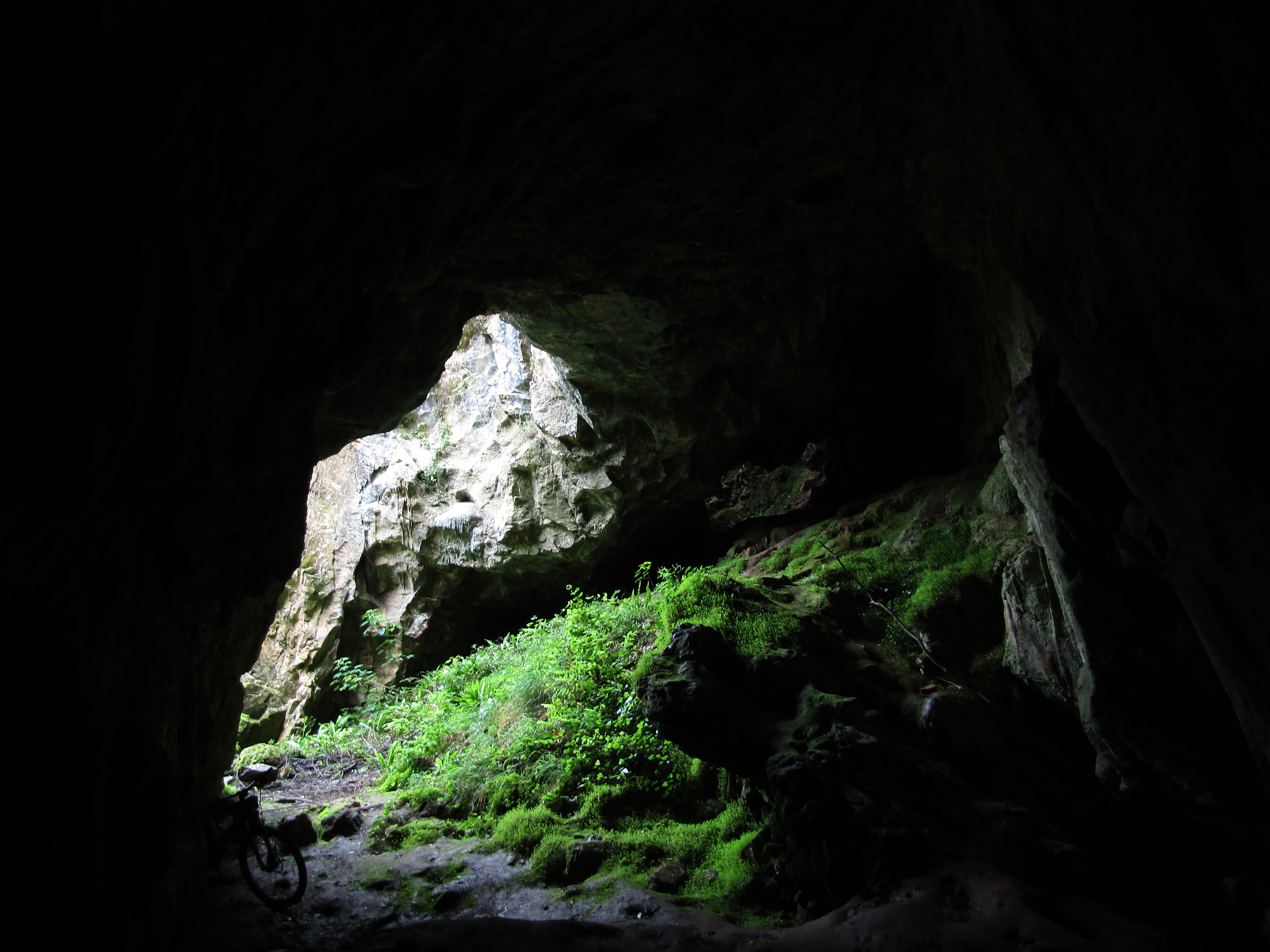
Inside Ash Hole Cavern

Ash Hole Cavern is reached by an approximately 50-metre walk from the Berry Head Road, through an area of woodland and undergrowth.

The cave, which is situated in the limestone rock of the Devonian age, consists of an east–west-orientated main chamber and several other fissures and smaller chambers. There are two entrances into the cave: the naturally formed entrance is at the bottom of a sinkhole at the eastern end of the main chamber, and a larger entrance, created by a breach during quarrying in the 19th century, is on the northern side.

Apart from the large main chamber, there are several smaller chambers, which extend downwards into the rock. One has a large quantity of loose rock within it, and this chamber also extends upwards to a smaller chamber, underneath which a ladder helps gain access. This chamber has a number of inscriptions of the flowstone covering its walls, with some dating back to at least the 1920s.

The cave is situated close to Shoalstone Beach and the Berry Head Hotel.

== History ==
There is evidence that the cave has been used for shelter by humans since the Bronze Age, and several pottery fragments of that era have been found just inside the natural entrance.

There is also evidence of Roman burials in the cavern. Several fragments of urns have been found, in which have been found ashes and around those have been found bone fragments. These have been dated to be from Roman times. Also found were several Roman coins including those of Claudius and Nero which were discovered in 1831.

== Excavations ==
Several excavations have taken place in Ash Hole Cavern. Two have been recorded, one in the 19th century and one in the 20th century.

=== 19th century ===
In around 1830, an excavation was carried out by the Rev. Henry Francis Lyte, who lived nearby.

Octavian Blewitt, writing in 1832, reported that there was a tradition that the cave was once open to a much greater extent, and that one passage led to Kingswear, four miles distant. The first step in the excavation was to find this passage, and every potential area was examined for it, especially the extremities of the cavern, where the stalagmite was quarried through in several places in search of it, but in vain. Blewitt concluded that there was no reason to believe that such a passage had ever existed.

Blewitt went on to report that next a perpendicular shaft was dug into the lowest part of the floor of the cave, and after four feet of rubbish had been worked through a layer of bones was discovered which was found to cover the whole of the floor of the cave at about the same depth. They consisted of sheep, ox, rabbit, goose and chicken bones. Their vast quantities confused the excavators, but they later discovered that a large military encampment had been held in the neighbouring down for the whole of summer, and the weather was extremely wet, the soldiers had eaten their meals in the cavern; which accounted for the accumulation of bones.

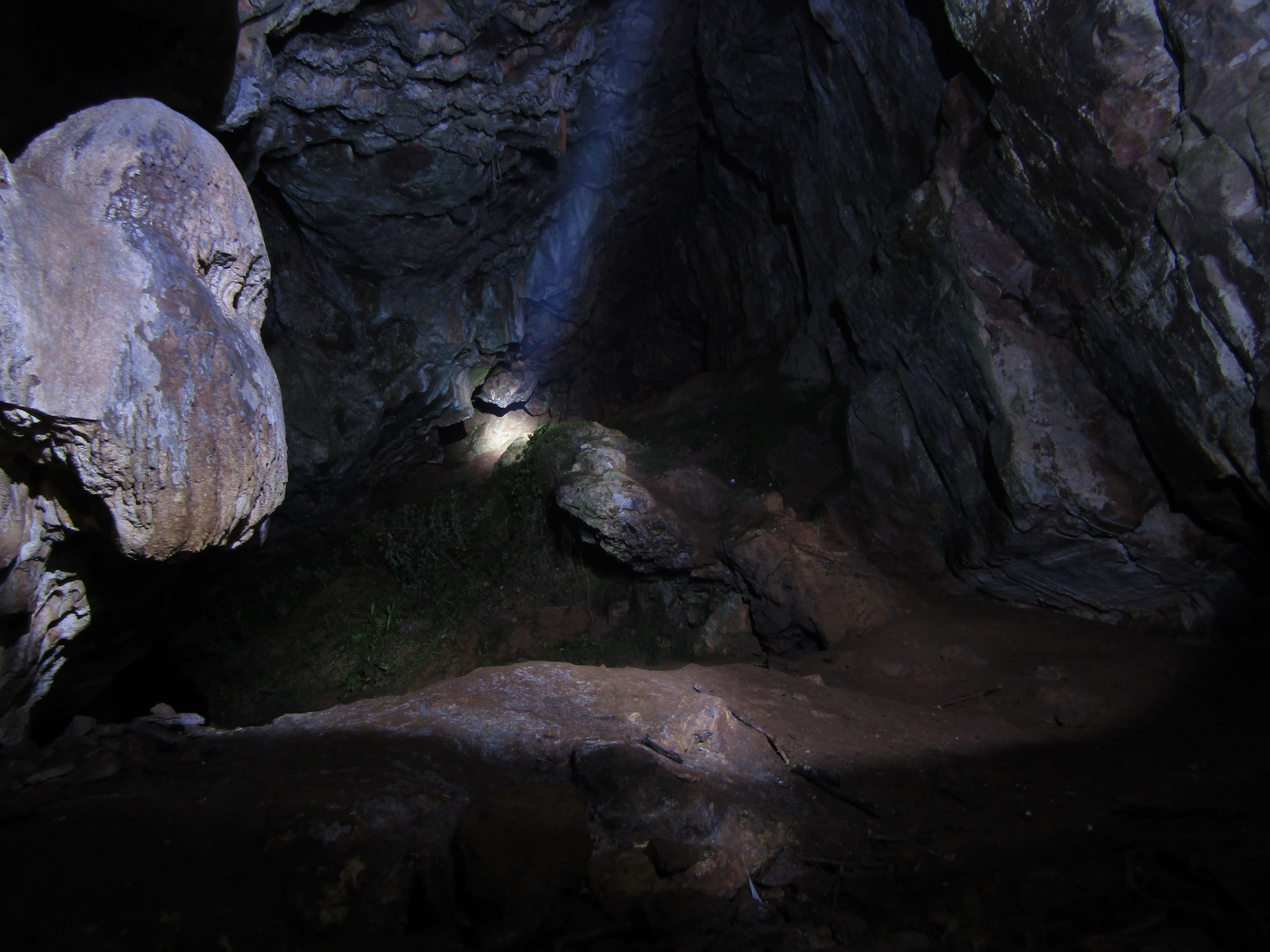
Looking towards the natural entrance at night

The shaft was then enlarged, and driven 20 feet deeper and there the remains of a human skeleton were found. Immediately under this were found considerable quantities of charcoal and ashes, and half-consumed bones, mixed with broken pottery, which proved the cavern had been a place of sepulchre, and perhaps accounted for the name of Ash Hole - a receptacle for the ashes of the dead. The pottery was Roman and was very coarse, unglazed, scored on the outside in short parallel lines and was occasionally perforated around the rim. No single urn was found perfect but specimens of the shards were preserved.

Several human skeletons were subsequently discovered, together with some sling-stones, pieces of brass and ivory, and pottery of a finer texture; but although another chamber of the cavern was excavated, and the shaft in the floor sunk to a perpendicular depth of seventy feet, nothing else of particular interest was discovered and the original floor of the cavern was never reached; the workings having been carried out in the vast fragments of rock which had fallen into the cave from the sides and mouth of it, and the excavation among the loose stones became too dangerous to proceed. Lyte's research established that the cave was the burial place of the Roman garrison.

=== 20th century ===
More pottery fragments, flint, and a Roman coin were found in the cave earth between 1965 and 1967. Most of the pottery was found to belong to the Bronze Age and was assigned to the regional Trevisker style of pottery (c. 1750–1000 BC). It was discovered that the cave had also been occupied in the Neolithic, Iron Age, and Roman times.

Numerous artefacts recovered from the cave are on display in the Brixham Museum, including pottery fragments.

== See also ==
- Caves in Devon
- List of caves in the United Kingdom
