= Straight Point =

Headland on the south coast of Devon, England

Coordinates: 50.60660°N 3.36177°W

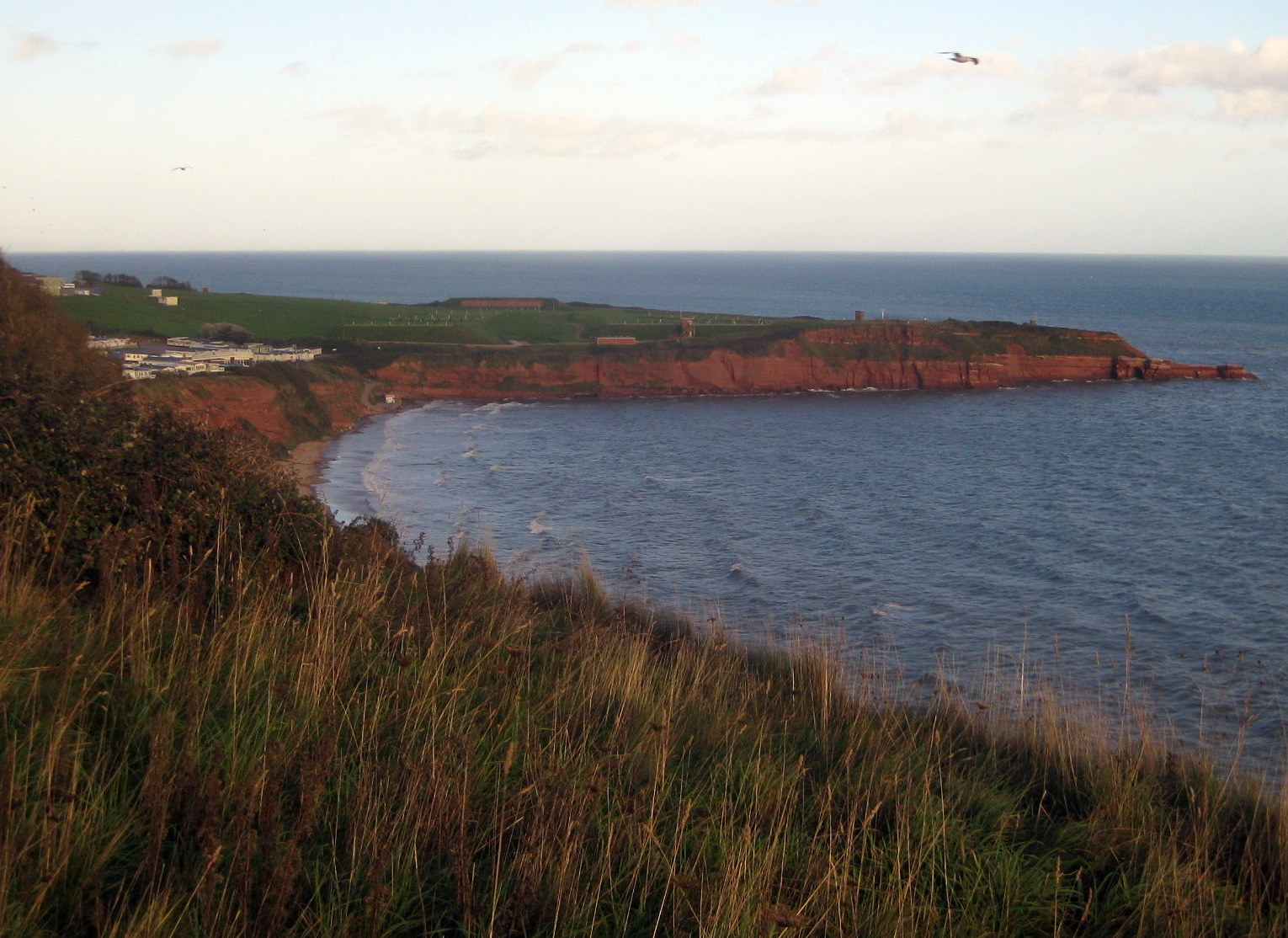
View across Sandy Bay to Straight Point

Straight Point is a coastal region, forming a headland, between Exmouth and Budleigh Salterton in Devon on the south coast of England.

== Location ==
Straight Point is about 16 kilometres (9.9 mi) south of the city of Exeter, 4 kilometres (2.5 mi) southeast of Exmouth and about 11 kilometres (6.8 mi) southwest of Sidmouth.

The top of the headland is used by the Royal Marines as a firing range, established using emergency powers during the second world war. To the west is Sandy Bay, a holiday beach, that can be reached either along the coastal path or through the large caravan park. To the east are Otter Cove and Littleton Cove. A navigational light for shipping was established on Straight Point in 1950 due the difficult conditions in the area for ships approaching the coast.

== Geology ==
The red sandstone cliffs at Straight Point show a sequence of sandstones in the Exmouth Formation. Predominantly the cliffs are composed of layers of Aylesbeare Mudstone, including some sandstone layers. They represent the earliest geology along the entire coast. They are from the Triassic period and date from 250 million years ago. Both sediments are markedly red, which indicates that they were formed in a desert.

At the east is an erosional platform, abraded by quartzite pebbles from the Budleigh Salterton pebble bed, seen at the neighbouring Littleham Cove.

At low tide most of the western section is accessible at low tide from Sandy Bay, but only a small part of the eastern side.
