= Reed's Cave =

Cave in Devon, England

Coordinates: 50.484°N 3.772°W

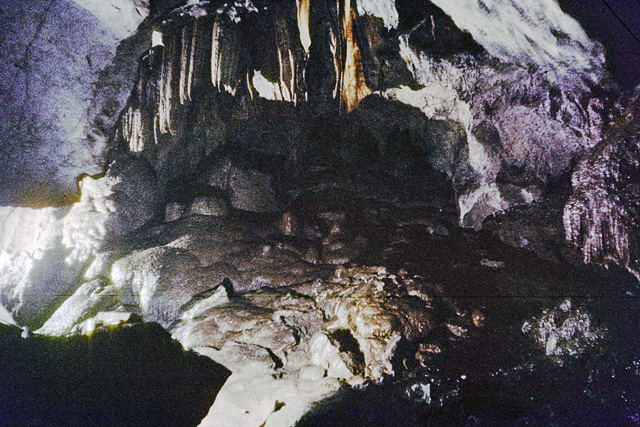
Easter Chamber, Reeds Cave, Buckfastleigh

Reed's cave is a cave in Higher Kiln Quarry near Buckfastleigh, Dartmoor, Devon. It has many formations including the unique Little Man formation, which is beyond Easter Chamber. Devon's only true troglobite collembolan Pseudosinella dobati is recorded from this cave.

People are generally not allowed to enter Reed's Cave, but some entries are permitted during the summer months. Reed's Cave was once connected to Bakers pit but the connection has been filled in with concrete. Because of entry restrictions, the cave has become an important roosting site for greater horseshoe bats.

== Easter Chamber ==
Near the entrance, there is a long crawl followed by a squeeze that leads to a grotto followed by Easter Chamber. Easter Chamber has many boulders and a few pools and formations. From here, some passages lead to the "little man" formation, which is directly below the tomb of the Cabell family.
