= Chudleigh Cavern =

Cave in Devon, England

Coordinates: 50.5967°N 3.6058°W

Chudleigh Cavern is a limestone cave outside the town of Chudleigh in Devon, England. The cave is deep and contains stalactites. A small part is open to the public as a show cave. The rest is open only to experienced cavers.

== Description ==
The entrance to the cave is found in a public garden, the Rock House Garden, a protected "triple Site of Scientific Interest," so designated by English Nature. The first part is open to the public, and contains several plants or lichens. The public section ends in a barrier, beyond which is a shaft. After the shaft a tight passage leads to some cave formations and a dead end.

== Flora and fauna ==
The cave is home to Belba pulveruleuta, a mite.
