= Teign Valley Group =

Geological formation in southern England

- Stratigraphic range: Famennian (Devonian) to Marsdenian (Carboniferous)
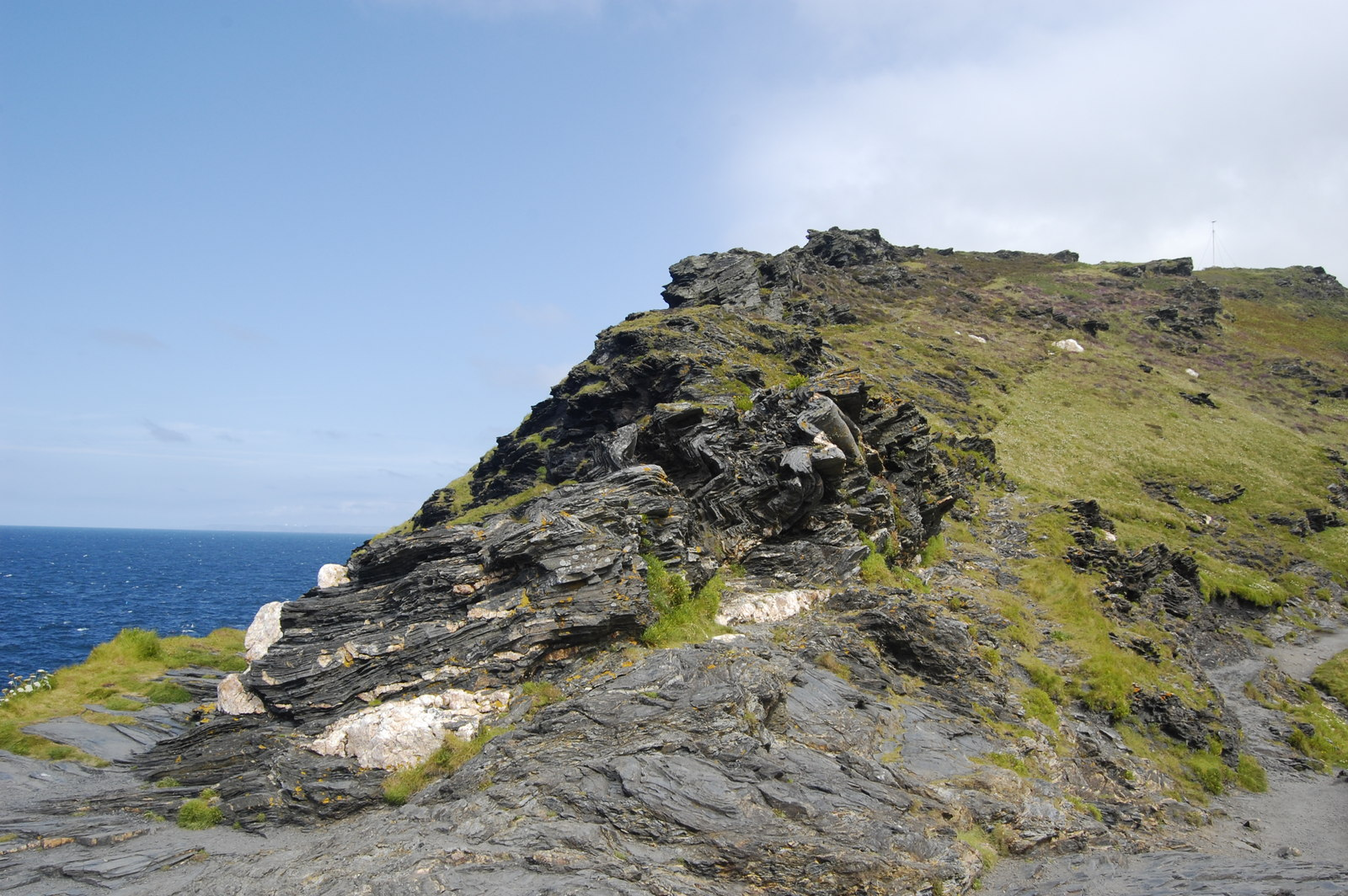
- Folded slate at Penally Point near Boscastle in Cornwall, England
- Type: Group
- Unit of: Culm Supergroup
- Sub-units: Barras Nose Formation, Trambley Cove Formation, Teign Chert Formation, Dowhills Mudstone Formation, Boscastle Formation, Brendon Formation, St Mellion Formation
- Underlies: Holsworthy Group
- Overlies: Exmoor Group
- Thickness: 100 to 720m

Lithology
- Primary: mudstones,
- Other: cherts, sandstones, limestones, basaltic lavas, tuffs

Location
- Region: England
- Country: United Kingdom
- Extent: north Cornwall through Devon to west Somerset

Type section
- Named for: valley of River Teign

The Teign Valley Group is a late Devonian to late/middle Carboniferous lithostratigraphic group (a sequence of rock strata) in north Cornwall through Devon and into west Somerset in southwest England. The name is derived from the valley of the River Teign. The Group comprises (in ascending order i.e. oldest first) the Barras Nose, Trambley Cove, Teign Chert and Dowhills Mudstone formations. It also includes the Brendon and St Mellion formations whose stratigraphical context is unclear since all known boundaries of these two unit are tectonic. The Brendon Formation slates extend from Tavistock west to Bodmin Moor. The St Mellion Formation sandstones, siltstones and mudstones are found from Holne northeastwards. The Teign Valley Group was formerly known as the Lower Culm Group or Lower Culm Measures.
