= Holsworthy Group =

- Stratigraphic range: Namurian to Bolsovian (Carboniferous)
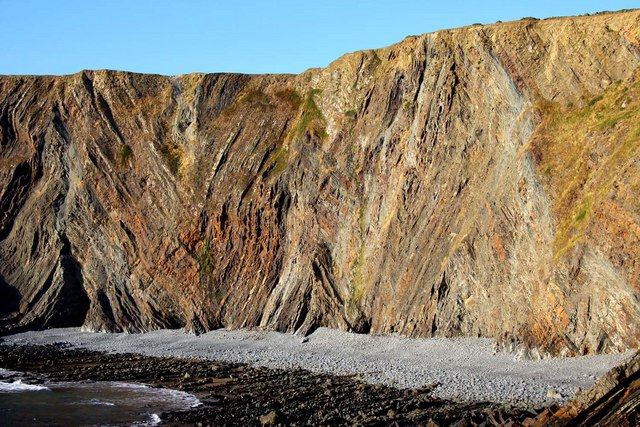
- Chevron folded alternations of sandstone and mudstone of the Crackington Formation, Warren Bay, Hartland Quay
- Type: Group
- Unit of: Culm Supergroup
- Sub-units: Crackington Formation, Bideford Formation, Bude Formation
- Underlies: Exeter Group
- Overlies: Teign Valley Group
- Thickness: 3500 to 4000m

Lithology
- Primary: mudstones,
- Other: siltstones, sandstones, conglomerates

Location
- Region: England
- Country: United Kingdom
- Extent: north and east Cornwall to north and east Devon

Type section
- Named for: Holsworthy

The Holsworthy Group is a late Carboniferous lithostratigraphic group (a sequence of rock strata) in north and east Cornwall and Devon in southwest England. The name is derived from the Devon town of Holsworthy. The Group comprises (in ascending order i.e. oldest first) the Crackington, Bideford and Bude formations. In the Launceston area the group is represented by the Bealsmill Formation. It was formerly known as the Upper Culm Group.

The Crackington Formation is over 1km thick in the Exeter area but amounts to only 250m around Bideford. It consists of mudstones with lesser sandstones and siltstones displaying rhythmic bedding, typical of turbidite deposits. The overlying Bideford Formation is over 1200m thick in places and consists of interbedded sandstones, mudstones and siltstones with a range of different characters including turbidites, channel sandstones, cross-bedded and slumped sandstones and locally contains burrows and rootlets. The Bude Formation is calculated to be around 1.3km thick along the north coast and consists of silty sandstones and mudstones. It is fossiliferous and locally contains ironstones and calcareous nodules. The Bealsmill Formation is at least 120m thick and consists of interbedded sandstones, siltstones and mudstones with some conglomerate beds containing chert, lava and limestone clasts.
