= Cow Cave =

Cave in Devon, England

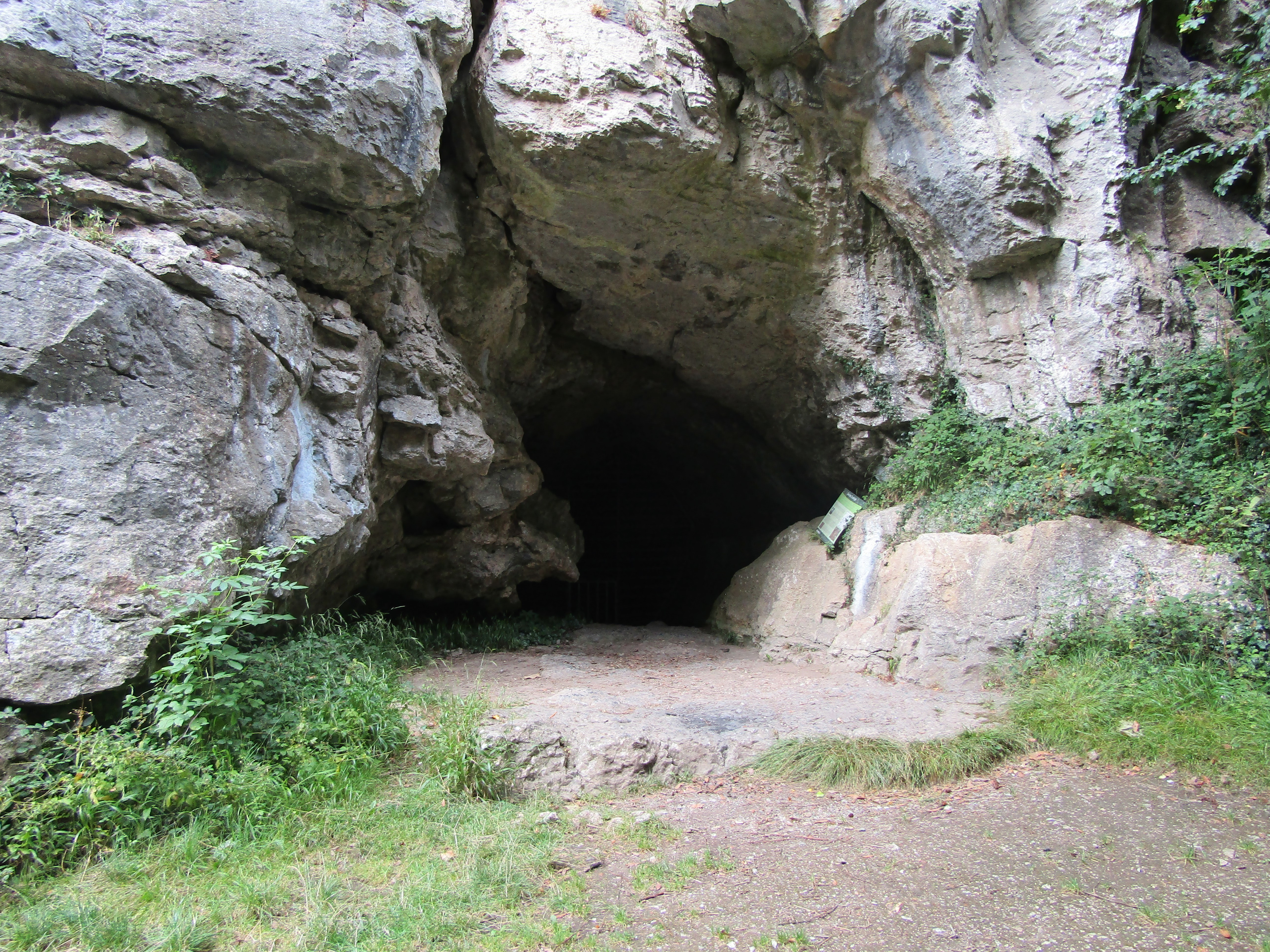
- The entrance to Cow Cave

- Location within Devon
- Location: Chudleigh Rock, Devon, England
- OS grid: SX 86469 78668
- Coordinates: 50.596675°N 3.605426°W
- Geology: Limestone
- Access: Gated

Cow Cave is a limestone cave system which is situated on the south side of the Chudleigh Rocks, close to the town of Chudleigh, Devon, England. It is listed as a Scheduled Monument by Historic England and was first listed in 1992.

== Description ==
The entrance to the cave is situated on the side of a large limestone outcrop known as Chudleigh Rocks. The entrance, which is arched, is approximately 4.5 metres high and 5 metres in width.

== Excavations ==
Cow Cave is known to contain significant deposits of material from the Paleolithic period.

A significant excavation was carried out in 2016.

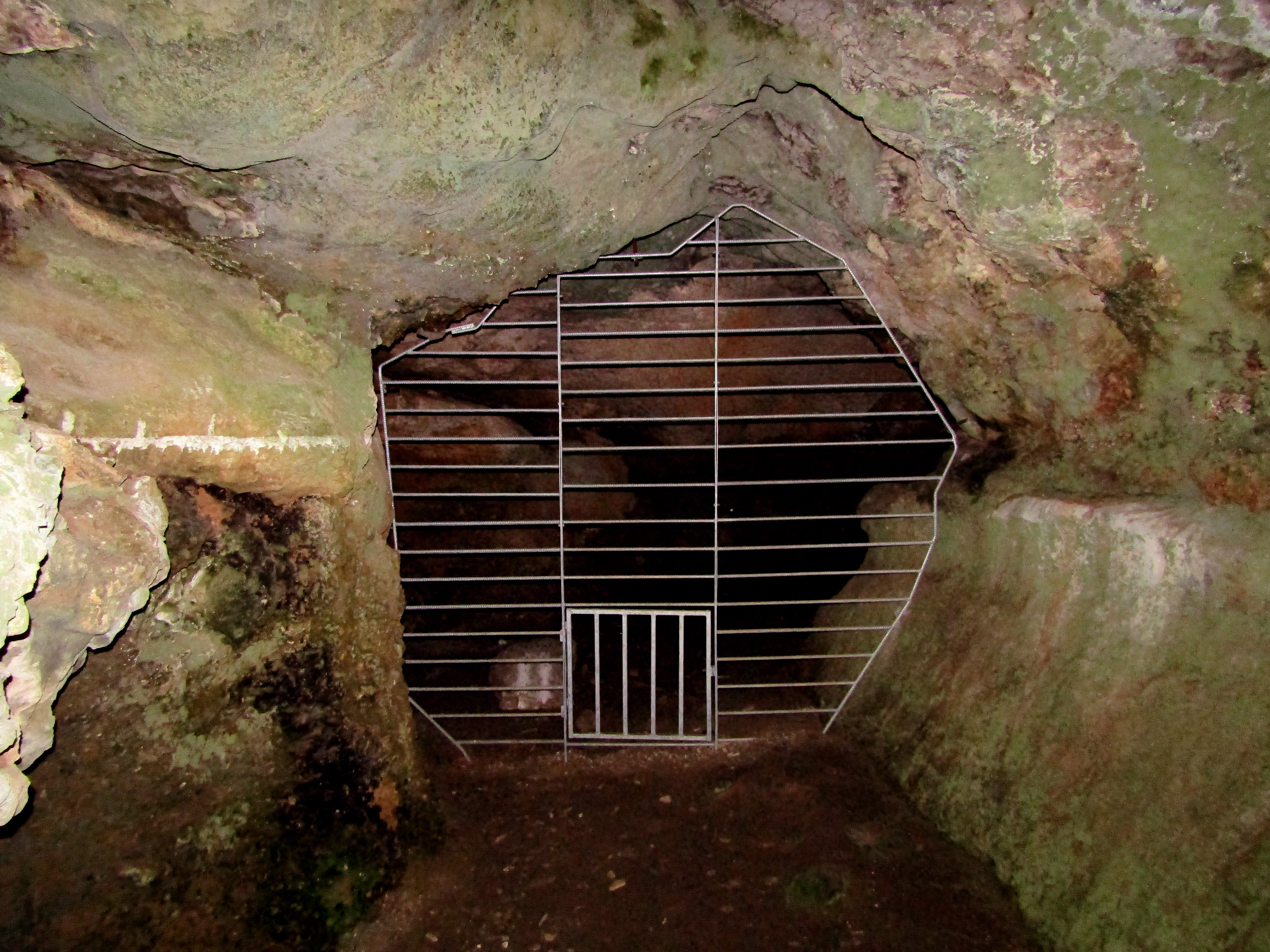
Cow Cave Gate
