= Luxullianite =

Rare type of granite

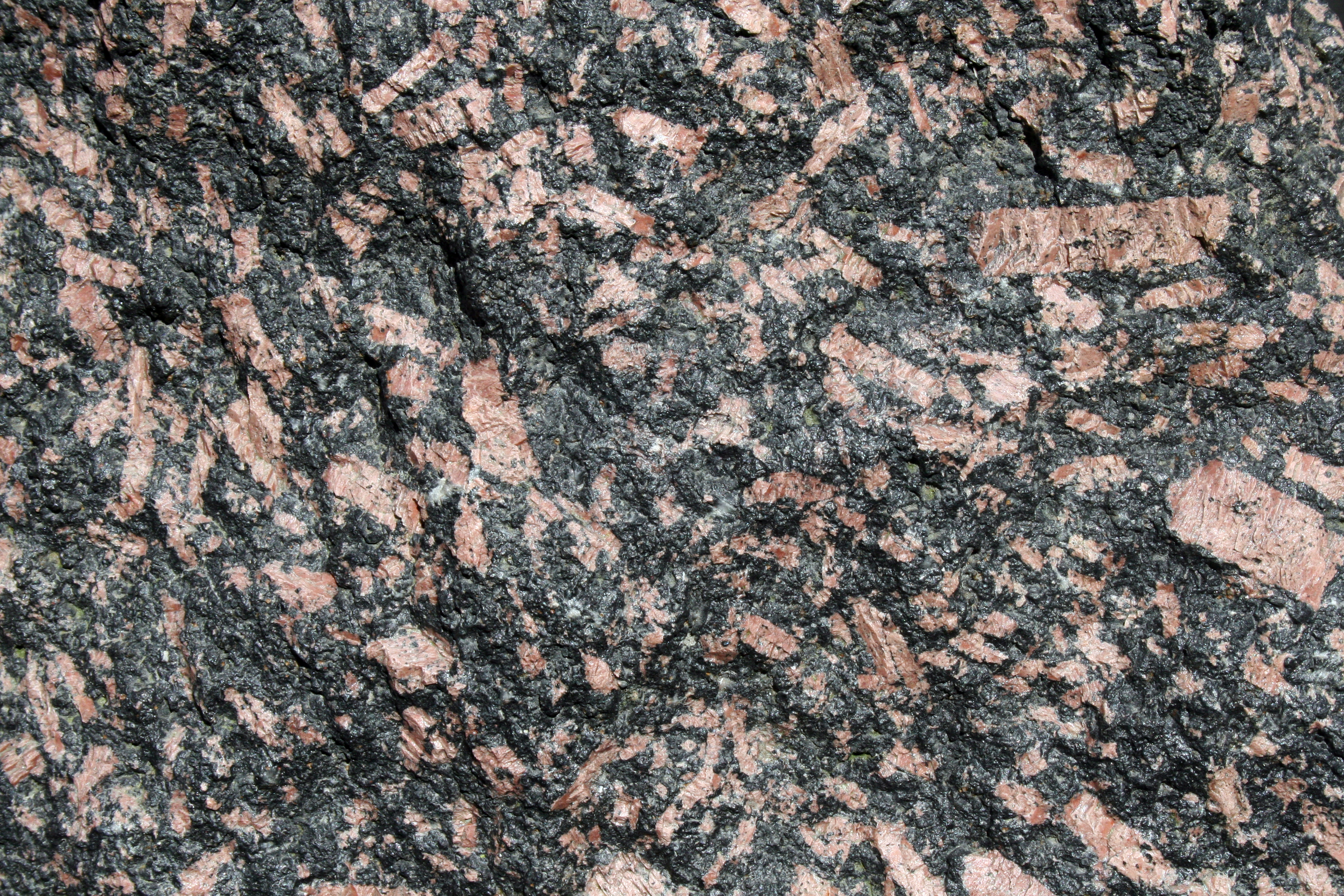
Luxullianite from Cornwall, showing dark patches of tourmaline and pink crystals of orthoclase

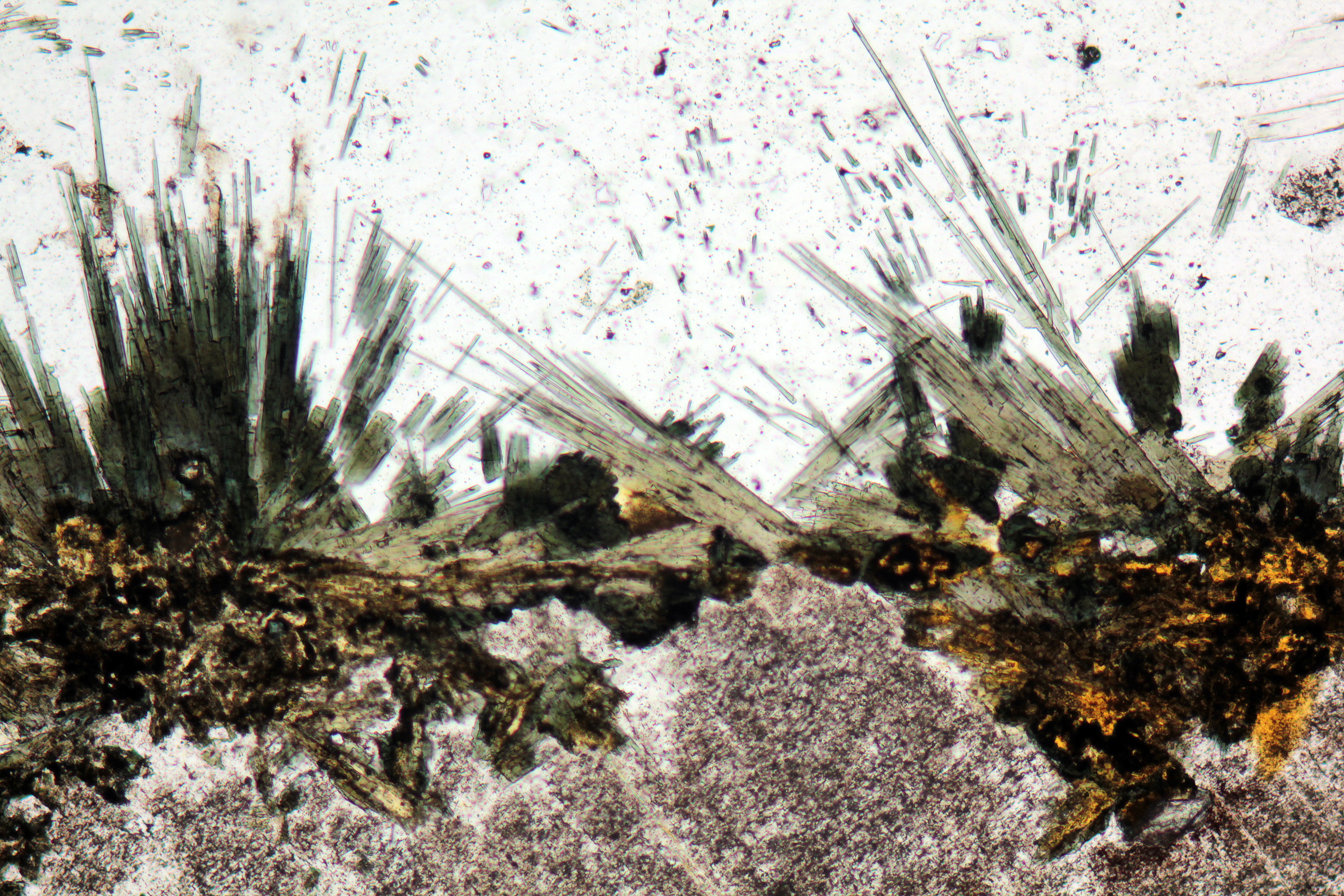
Thin section of luxullianite from Cornwall, showing clusters of radially-arranged, acicular, greenish tourmaline crystals

Luxullianite (also known as luxulyanite or luxulianite) is a rare type of porphyritic tourmalinized granite, notable for the presence of clusters of radially-arranged acicular tourmaline crystals enclosed by phenocrysts of orthoclase and quartz in a matrix of quartz, tourmaline, alkali feldspar, brown mica, and cassiterite.

The name originates from the village of Luxulyan in Cornwall, United Kingdom, where this type of granite is found. An example may be seen in the Duke of Wellington's tomb in St Paul's Cathedral in London. Some luxullianite is also used in the Porphyry Hall of Place in Fowey.
