= Megacryst =

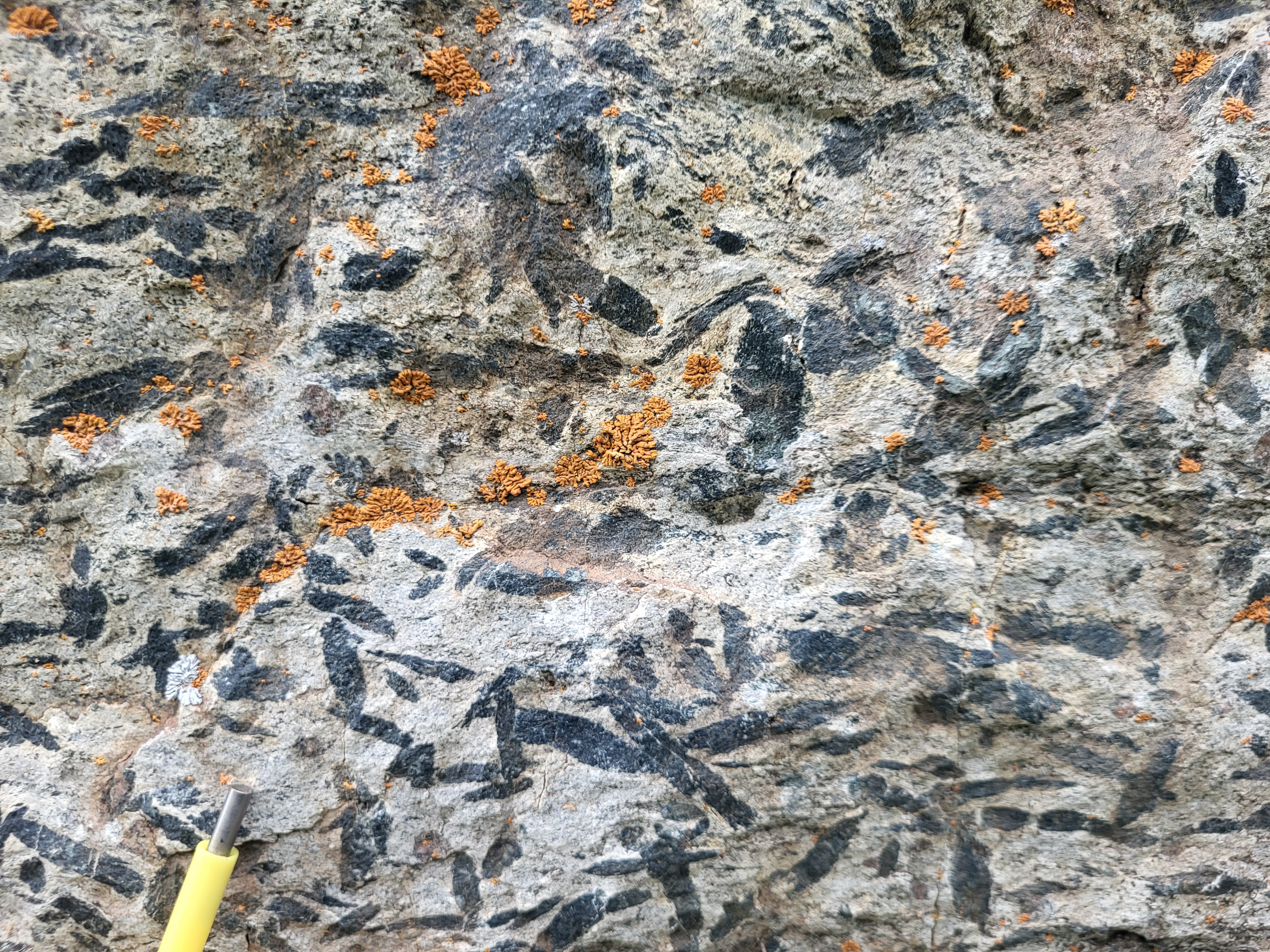
Megacrystic porphyroblasts in metasomatised Quartenschiefer (metapelitic unit in the Alps)

In geology, a megacryst is a crystal or grain that is considerably larger than the encircling matrix. They are found in igneous and metamorphic rocks. Megacrysts can be further classified based on the nature of their origin, either as:

- Phenocrysts, which crystallize in molten rock material (lava or magma) and are hence an earlier crystallization than the matrix in which they are embedded
- Porphyroblasts, which develop in solid rock as the result of metamorphism or metasomatism

== See also ==
- Xenolith, an inclusion of one rock type in another

== Notes ==
- Significance of k-feldspar megacryst size and distribution in the tuolumne intrusive suite, California
