= Exeter Group =

Group of rock formations

- Stratigraphic range: Cisuralian
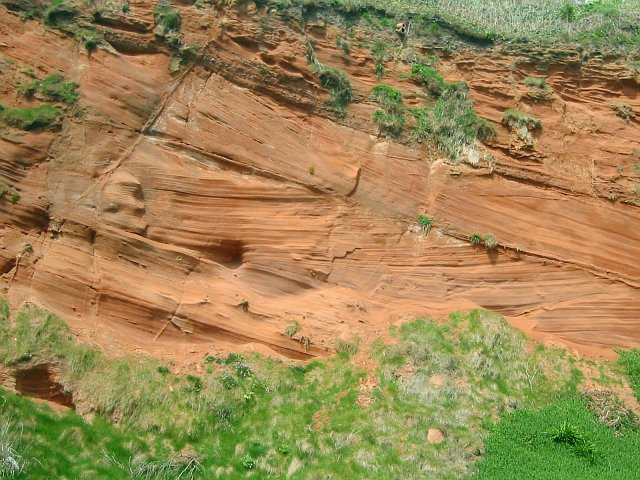
- Cross-bedded sandstone of the Dawlish Sandstone Formation, near Dawlish
- Type: Group
- Unit of: New Red Sandstone Supergroup
- Underlies: Aylesbeare Mudstone Group
- Overlies: Holsworthy Group

Lithology
- Primary: breccia
- Other: sandstone

Location
- Region: southwest England
- Country: England
- Extent: east Devon

Type section
- Named for: Exeter

The Exeter Group is a Permian lithostratigraphic group (a sequence of rock strata) which occurs through East Devon in southwest England. The name is derived from the city of Exeter in Devon which is partly underlain by rocks of this age.

== Outcrops ==
These rocks are found along the coast of East Devon and northwards to the Tiverton trough.

== Lithology and stratigraphy ==
The Group comprises over 700m of sedimentary breccias with subordinate sandstones. It is divided into numerous formations: the Dawlish Formation, Monkerton Formation, Heavitree Breccia, Alphington Breccia, Whipton Formation, Knowle Sandstone, Shute Sandstone, Yellowford Formation, Crediton Breccia, Thorverton Sandstone, Cadbury Breccia, Newton St Cyres Formation, Creedy Park Sandstone, and Bow Breccia. The Cadbury Breccia may be Carboniferous in age. The Wytch Farm Breccia proved in a borehole to the east is also assigned to the Group.
