= Bakers Pit =

Cave system in Devon, England

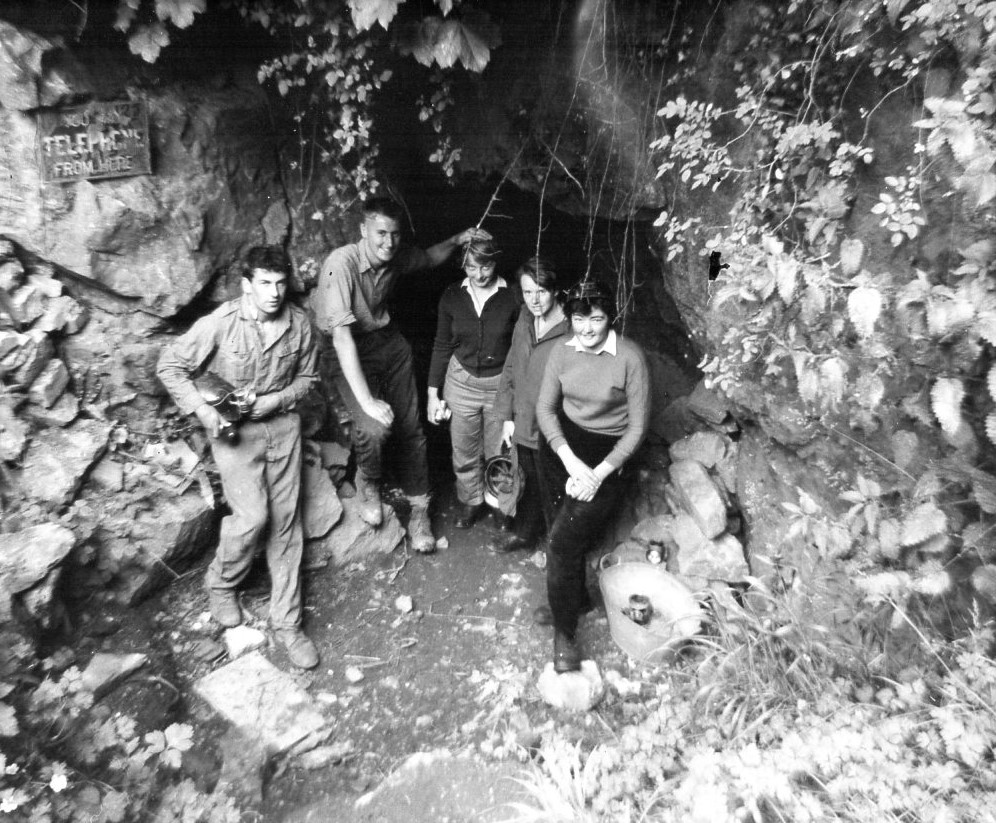
- Baker's Pit Cave entrance in 1961
- Interactive map of Bakers Pit
- Location: Buckfastleigh, Devon, England
- Coordinates: 50°29′4.61″N 3°46′28.41″W
- Length: 3,631 metres (11,913 ft)
- Discovery: 1847
- Geology: Middle Devonian Limestone
- Entrances: 1
- Access: DCUC (key required)

Bakers Pit is a phreatic maze cave system near Buckfastleigh, Devon, England.

It was first opened in 1847 by quarrying activities.

Bakers Pit is entered via a vertical descent of 16 metres. It has 3.631 kilometres (2.256 mi) of passage contained within an area of 4 hectares (9.9 acres) and a small stream, flowing to the River Dart, that is still actively developing the cave. It was once connected to Reeds cave, however, only "voice" connection is currently possible, and only in a few locations. Connections between the two systems have been filled in with concrete to protect the beautiful formations in the Reeds cave.

The cave was much frequented between the wars by local people during which time many of the calcite formations were destroyed, although some formations have now naturally regenerated. In the early 1960s an upper series was discovered significantly extending the known cave by as much as 50 per cent by climbing a vertical slot in the roof. This extension is better known as the Plymouth Extension and this area contains some of the best examples of formations due to its difficult access of squeezes and climbs. This upper series once went up to the surface but for conservation this has been sealed off with an emergency plan in place in case of rescue from this upper series..

== Wildlife ==
Devon caves are good places to find humidity-loving collembola and Pseudosinella dobati (a blind white cave-adapted species), Symphyla isabellae, Tetracanthella britannica and Heteromurus nitidus have been recorded in Baker's Pit. Other invertebrates include the staphilinid beetle Quedius mesomelinus and the arachnid Lessertia denticalis.
