= Culm Measures =

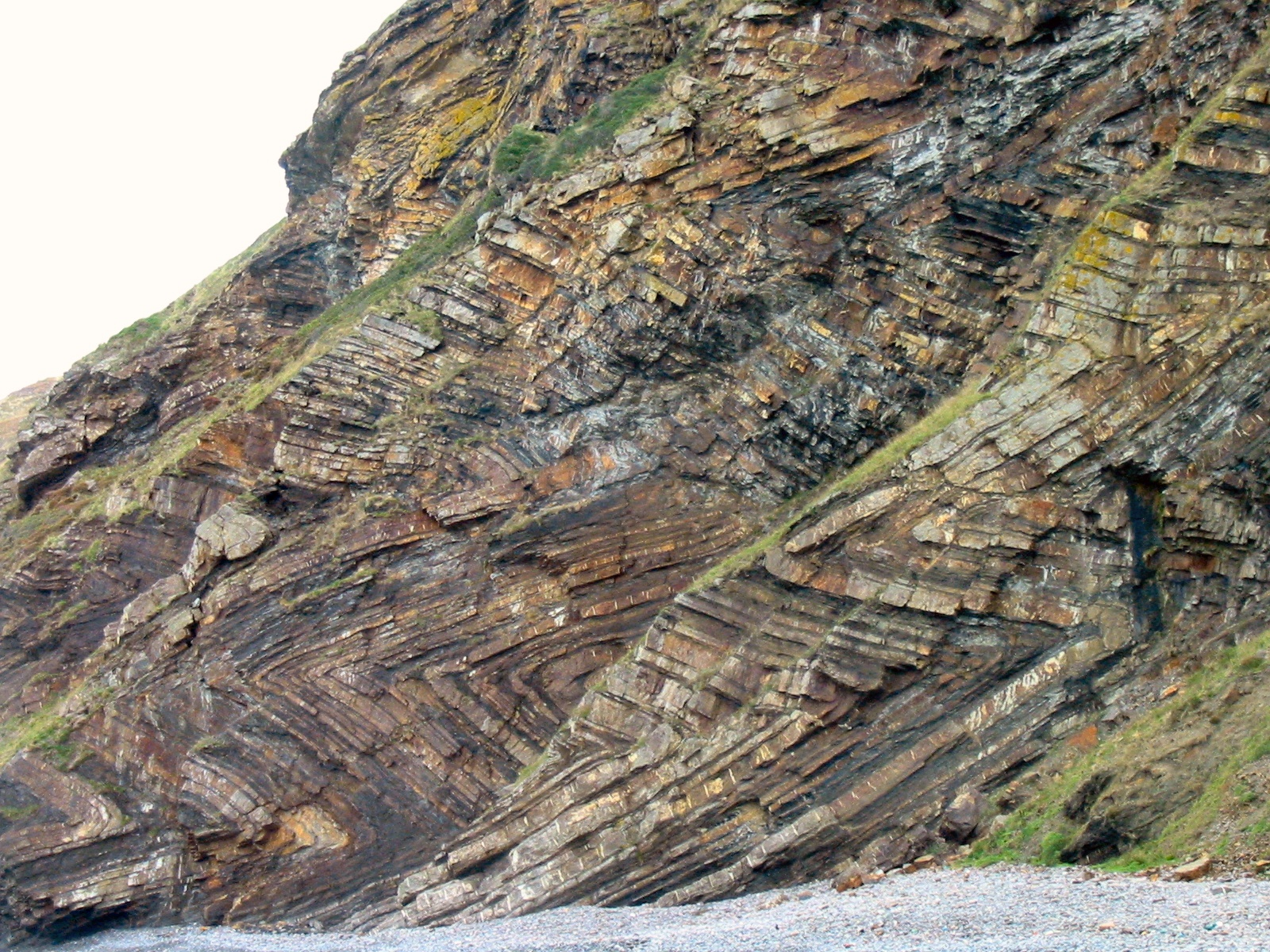
Chevron folding in the cliffs at Millook Haven, North Cornwall

The Culm Measures are a thick sequence of geological strata originating during the Carboniferous Period that occur in south-west England, principally in Devon and Cornwall, now known as the Culm Supergroup. Its estimated thickness varies between 3600 m and 4750 m though intense folding complicates it at outcrop. They are so called because of the occasional presence in the Barnstaple–Hartland area of a soft, often lenticular, sooty coal, which is known in Devon as culm. The word culm may be derived from the Old English word for coal col or from the Welsh word cwlwm meaning knot (due to the folding of the beds in which the coal is found).

Most of the succession consists of shales and thin sandstones, but there are also occurrences of slate, limestone and chert.

Culm grassland on the formation's slates and shales is composed of purple moor grass and rush pasture. It is noted for a wide diversity of species, some extremely rare including the marsh fritillary butterfly. Some 92 percent of Culm grassland has been lost in the past 100 years, 48 percent being lost between 1984 and 1991 alone. There are a number of organisations trying to halt the decline including Devon Wildlife Trust with its Culm Natural Networks project, Butterfly Conservation, and Natural England with its Environmental Stewardship Scheme.

Culm soils have traditionally been used for grazing as they are heavy to work and acidic.

== Geological subdivisions of the Culm ==
In the main Culm Basin and north Devon the succession is nowadays divided into an upper Holsworthy Group and an underlying Teign Valley Group (formerly and popularly, the 'Lower Culm'). By way of contrast, in south Devon the entire supergroup is represented by the Chudleigh Group. The Holsworthy Group is itself divided into an upper Bude Formation and a lower Crackington Formation though a Bideford Formation intervenes in the Bideford area. In the Launceston area the entire group is represented by the Bealsmill Formation. The Teign Valley Group is subdivided into numerous formations, two of the more significant of which are the Dowhills Mudstone and Teign Chert formations. The Chudleigh Group divides into an upper Ugbrooke Sandstone Formation and a lower Winstow Chert Formation.

== National character area ==
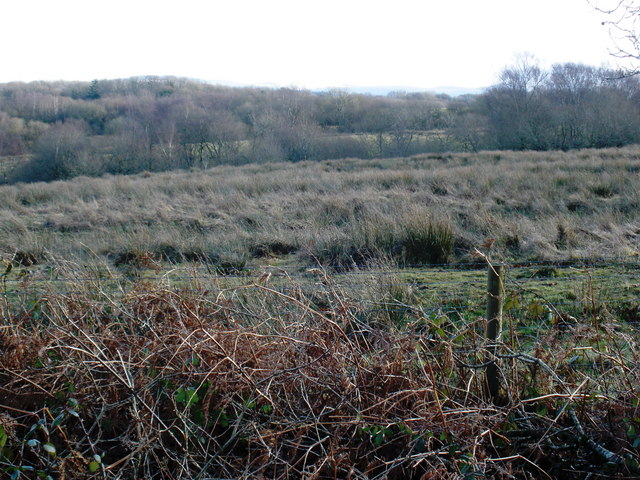
Boggy moorland near Hatherleigh

The Culm Measures give their name to The Culm national character area and natural area of England, a component of a landscape classification system co-ordinated by the public body Natural England. The Culm NCA covers a large part of north Devon, and contains 3,831 ha of the Dartmoor National Park, 9,009 ha of the North Devon Coast Area of Outstanding Natural Beauty (AONB) and 7,814 ha of the Cornwall AONB, as well as the North Devon Heritage Coast. The area is especially known for Culm grassland (nationally known as rhos pasture): species-rich pastures, typical of poorly drained acid soils, which support a suite of purple moor-grass and rush communities, forming a mosaic of vegetation communities with heathland, other species-rich grassland and wet woodland. This is a habitat unlike any other in England, which supports distinctive and often attractive plant species, including heath spotted-orchid, southern marsh-orchid, bogbean, and saw-wort; a number of characteristic butterflies, including the marbled white, and marsh, heath, silver-washed and high brown fritillaries; and a number of typical bird species including grasshopper warbler and willow tit, as well as breeding Eurasian curlew and reed bunting, and overwintering snipe and woodcock.
