= List of geological groups of Great Britain =

This is a sortable list of the groups into which the rock succession of Great Britain and surrounding seas is formally divided. Rock sequences are described by geologists by dividing them hierarchically thus: individual 'beds' of rock (or in the case of certain volcanic rocks, 'flows') are grouped into 'members', members are grouped into 'formations', formations into 'groups' and groups occasionally into 'supergroups'. Some groups are also subdivided into 'subgroups'. Not all of these hierarchical layers are necessarily present or defined within a particular rock succession. Many of these groups will be encountered as 'series' in older geological literature or indeed simply as the proper name e.g. 'Dalradian' or 'Millstone Grit' though care needs to be exercised as many of the names have or have had other meanings which may not coincide with the assemblage of rocks referred to formally through designation as a 'group'.

With all such stratigraphical terms as 'groups', 'formations' and 'members' it is standard practice to capitalise both the proper name and the 'term-word' as per the recommendation of the International Commission on Stratigraphy e.g. Wentnor Group and not Wentnor group.

Notes:

Column 1 indicates the name of the geological group. Those marked with an asterisk are no longer formally recognised but are included as they occur widely in literature.

Column 2 indicates during which geological period the rocks of each group were deposited. Note that where more than one period is indicated deposition stretched across the period boundary in at least a part of the group's geographical extent but not necessarily across the whole of its extent.

Column 3 permits sorting by period in chronological order ie Quaternary Period is 01; Neogene,03; Palaeogene,05; Cretaceous,07; Jurassic,09 Triassic,11; Permian,13; Carboniferous,15; Devonian,17; Silurian,19; Ordovician,21; Cambrian,23; Ediacaran,25; Cryogenian,27; Tonian,29; Stenian, 31; and Ectasian, 33 - the last five being some of the periods into which the Proterozoic Eon is divided.

Column 4 indicates in which of the three nations of Great Britain, the group is known to occur, followed by which of the surrounding sea areas (if any), including specifically: Atlantic Ocean, Celtic Sea, English Channel, Irish Sea, North Sea. (At present, for the purposes of this table 'Celtic Sea' also includes the Bristol Channel whilst 'Atlantic Ocean' includes all sea areas off the west coast of Scotland.) Note that the Isle of Man is not a part of Great Britain but is included here for convenience.

Group	Period	Period sequence	Country/sea area
Aberystwyth Grits Group	Silurian	19	Wales
Albion Glacigenic Group	Quaternary	01	England, Scotland, Celtic Sea
Ancholme Group	Jurassic	09	England
Appin Group	Cryogenian	27	Scotland
Appleby Group	Permian	13	England, Scotland
Aran Volcanic Group	Ordovician	21	Wales
Arbuthnott Group*	Devonian	17	Scotland
Arbuthnott-Garvock Group	Devonian	17	Scotland
Ardmillan Group	Ordovician	21	Scotland
Ardvreck Group	Cambrian	23	Scotland
Arfon Group	Ediacaran	25	Wales
Argyll Group	Ediacaran	25	Scotland
Avon Group	Carboniferous	15	England, Wales
Aylesbeare Group*	Triassic	11	England
Aylesbeare Mudstone Group	Triassic	11	England
Bacton Group	Triassic	11	North Sea
Badenoch Group	Tonian	29	Scotland
Balcreuchan Group	Cambrian/Ordovician	22	Scotland
Banks Group	Jurassic	09	North Sea
Barr Group	Ordovician	21	Scotland
Barton Group	Palaeogene	05	England
Bathgate Group	Carboniferous	15	Scotland
Benton Volcanic Group	Cryogenian	27	Wales
Bisat Group	Carboniferous	15	Irish Sea
Blackbrook Group	Ediacaran	25	England
Border Group	Carboniferous	15	England, Scotland
Borrowdale Volcanic Group	Ordovician	21	England
Bowland High Group	Carboniferous	15	England
Bracklesham Group	Palaeogene	05	England
Brand Group	Cambrian	23	England
Brent Group	Jurassic	09	North Sea
Britannia Catchments Group	Palaeogene/Neogene/Quaternary	04	England, Scotland, Wales, Irish Sea
British Coastal Deposits Group	Quaternary	01	England, Scotland, Wales, Irish Sea
Builth Volcanic Group	Ordovician	21	Wales
Caerbwdy Group	Ediacaran	25	Wales
Caerfai Group	Cambrian	23	Wales
Caithness Flagstone Group	Devonian	17	Scotland
Caledonia Glacigenic Group	Quaternary	01	England, Scotland, Wales, Irish Sea
Cementstone Group*	Carboniferous	15	Scotland
Chalk Group	Cretaceous	07	England, Atlantic Ocean, North Sea
Clackmannan Group	Carboniferous	15	Scotland
Claerwen Group	Silurian	19	Wales
Clair Group	Devonian/Carboniferous	16	Atlantic
Clwyd Limestone Group	Carboniferous	15	Wales
Coniston Group	Silurian	19	England
Conybeare Group	Carboniferous	15	North Sea
Corallian Group	Jurassic	09	England
Cosheston Group	Devonian	17	Wales
Crag Group	Neogene/Quaternary	02	England
Craven Group	Carboniferous	15	England, Isle of Man
Crawford Group	Ordovician	21	Scotland
Cromer Knoll Group	Cretaceous	07	England, Scotland, Atlantic Ocean, North Sea
Cumbrian Coast Group	Permian	13	England, Scotland, Irish Sea
Cwmystwyth Grits Group	Silurian	19	Wales
Dalby Group	Silurian	19	Isle of Man
Dartmouth Group	Devonian	17	England
Dent Group	Ordovician	21	England
Drefach Group	Ordovician	21	Wales
Dungavel Group	Silurian	19	Scotland
Dunlin Group	Jurassic	09	North Sea
Dunnottar-Crawton Group	Silurian/Devonian	18	Scotland
Dunrobin Bay Group	Jurassic	09	North Sea
Dunwich Group	Quaternary	01	England
Durness Group	Cambrian/Ordovician	22	Scotland
Eday Group	Devonian	17	Scotland
Eriboll Group	Cambrian	23	Scotland
Exeter Group	Permian	13	England
Exmoor Group	Devonian/Carboniferous	16	England
Eycott Group*	Ordovician	21	England
Eycott Volcanic Group	Ordovician	21	England
Faroe Group	Palaeogene	05	Atlantic Ocean
Farne Group	Carboniferous	15	North Sea
Fishguard Volcanic Group	Ordovician	21	Wales
Fladen Group	Jurassic	09	North Sea
Forres Sandstone Group	Devonian	17	Scotland
Gala Group	Silurian	19	Scotland
Garvock Group*	Devonian	17	Scotland
Garwood Group	Carboniferous	15	Irish Sea
Girvan Group	Silurian	19	Scotland
Glenbuck Group	Silurian	19	Scotland
Glenfinnan Group	Tonian	29	Scotland
Grampian Group	Cryogenian	27	Scotland
Gray Sandstone Group	Silurian	19	Wales
Great Estuarine Group	Jurassic	09	Scotland
Great Oolite Group	Jurassic	09	England, English Channel
Great Scar Limestone Group	Carboniferous	15	England, Isle of Man
Gwna Group	Ediacaran/Cambrian	24	Wales
Hagshaw Group	Silurian	19	Scotland
Haisborough Group	Triassic	11	North Sea
Harlech Grits Group	Cambrian	23	Wales
Hawick Group	Silurian	19	Scotland
Heron Group	Triassic	11	North Sea
Holsworthy Group	Carboniferous	15	England
Humber Group	Jurassic/Cretaceous	08	Scotland, Atlantic Ocean, North Sea
Inferior Oolite Group	Jurassic	09	England, Irish Sea, English Channel
Ingleton Group	Ordovician	21	England
Inner Hebrides Group	Cretaceous	07	Scotland
Inverclyde Group	Carboniferous	15	Scotland
Inverness Sandstone Group	Devonian	17	Scotland
Kendal Group	Silurian	19	England
Kidston Group	Carboniferous	15	Irish Sea, Celtic Sea
Kyle Group	Devonian	17	North Sea
Lambeth Group	Palaeogene	05	England
Lanark Group	Silurian/Devonian	18	Scotland
Lias Group	Triassic/Jurassic	10	England, Wales, Celtic Sea, English Channel, Irish Sea, North Sea
Llanbedrog Volcanic Group	Ordovician	21	Wales
Llewelyn Volcanic Group	Ordovician	21	Wales
Loch Maree Group	Palaeoproterozoic	33	Scotland
Locheil Group	Tonian	29	Scotland
Lower Greensand Group	Cretaceous	07	England, English Channel
Lower Old Red Group	Devonian	17	North Sea
Lower Old Red Sandstone Group	Silurian/Devonian	18	England, Scotland, Wales
Manx Group	Cambrian	23	Isle of Man
Maplewell Group	Ediacaran	25	England
Marros Group	Carboniferous	15	England, Wales
Mawddach Group	Cambrian	23	Wales
Meadfoot Group	Devonian	17	England
Menevian Group	Cambrian	23	Wales
Mercia Mudstone Group	Triassic	11	England, Scotland
Middle Old Red Group	Devonian	17	North Sea
Milford Haven Group	Silurian/Devonian	18	Wales
Millstone Grit Group	Carboniferous	15	England, Isle of Man
Moffat Shale Group	Ordovician/Silurian	20	Scotland
Monks Water Group	Silurian	19	Scotland
Montrose Group	Palaeogene	05	North Sea
Morar Group	Stenian/Tonian	30	Scotland
Moray Group	Palaeogene	05	Atlantic Ocean, North Sea
Mull Lava Group	Palaeogene	05	Scotland
Nordland Group	Neogene/Quaternary	02	Atlantic Ocean, North Sea
North Esk Group	Silurian	19	Scotland
Ogofgolchfa Group	Ediacaran	25	Wales
Ogwen Group	Ordovician	21	Wales
Papa Group	Triassic	11	Atlantic Ocean
Peak Limestone Group	Carboniferous	15	England
Peel Sandstone Group	Devonian	17	Isle of Man
Pembroke Limestone Group	Carboniferous	15	England, Wales
Penarth Group	Triassic/Jurassic	10	England, Wales, Scotland, Irish Sea, English Channel, North Sea
Pennine Coal Measures Group	Carboniferous	15	England, Isle of Man, Scotland, Wales
Penrhiw Group	Cryogenian/Ediacaran	26	Wales
Portland Group	Jurassic	09	England, English Channel
Priesthill Group	Silurian	19	Scotland
Purbeck Group	Jurassic/Cretaceous	08	England, English Channel
Ramsey Sound Group	Ediacaran	25	Wales
Ravenscar Group	Jurassic	09	England
Ravenstonedale Group	Carboniferous	15	England, Isle of Man
Red Marl Group	Silurian/Devonian	18	England, Wales
Residual Deposits Group	Palaeogene/Neogene/Quaternary	03	England
Reston Group	Silurian/Devonian	18	England, Scotland
Rhosson Group	Ediacaran	25	Wales
Redbourne Group*	Jurassic	09	England, Irish Sea, English Channel
Rhynie Group	Devonian	17	Scotland
Riccarton Group	Silurian	19	Scotland
Roch Rhyolitic Group*	Ordovician	21	Wales
Rotliegendes Group	Permian	13	England, North Sea
Sarclet Group	Devonian	17	Scotland
Scottish Coal Measures Group	Carboniferous	15	Scotland
Selborne Group	Cretaceous	07	England, English Channel
Sherwood Sandstone Group	Permian/Triassic	12	England, Scotland
Shetland Group	Cretaceous/Palaeogene	06	Atlantic Ocean, North Sea
Skerry Group	Jurassic	09	Atlantic Ocean
Skiddaw Group	Ordovician	21	England
Skiddaw Slates Group*	Ordovician	21	England
Skrinkle Sandstones Group	Devonian	17	Wales
Skye Lava Group	Palaeogene	05	Scotland
Sleat Group	Stenian	31	Scotland
Snowdon Volcanic Group	Ordovician	21	Wales
Solent Group	Palaeogene	05	England
Solva Group	Cambrian	23	Wales
South Wales Coal Measures Group	Carboniferous	15	Wales
Southern Highland Group	Ediacaran/Cambrian	24	Scotland
Stewartry Group	Permian	13	Scotland
Stirling Group*	Silurian	19	Scotland
Stockdale Group	Silurian	19	England
Stockingford Shale Group	Cambrian	23	England
Stoer Group	Ectasian/Stenian	32	Scotland
Stonehaven Group	Silurian	19	Scotland
Strathclyde Group	Carboniferous	15	Scotland
Stratheden Group	Devonian	17	Scotland
Strathmore Group	Devonian	17	Scotland
Stretton Group	Ediacaran	25	England
Stronsay Group	Palaeogene	05	Scotland, Atlantic Ocean, North Sea
Sutherland Group	Jurassic	09	Scotland
Tamar Group	Devonian	17	England
Tappins Group	Ordovician	21	Scotland
Tarskavaig Group	Stenian	31	Scotland
Teign Valley Group	Carboniferous	15	England
Thames Group	Palaeogene	05	England, English Channel
Torridon Group	Stenian/Tonian	30	Scotland
Tranearth Group	Silurian	19	England
Trawden Limestone Group	Carboniferous	15	England
Treffynnon Group	Ediacaran/Cambrian	24	Wales
Treginnis Group	Cryogenian/Ediacaran	26	Wales
Treglemais Group	Cryogenian/Ediacaran	26	Wales
Unst Phyllite Group	Ordovician/Silurian	20	Scotland
Upper Old Red Group	Carboniferous	15	North Sea
Upper Old Red Sandstone Group	Devonian/Carboniferous	16	England, Scotland, Wales, North Sea
Uriconian Group	Ediacaran	25	England
Warwickshire Group	Carboniferous/Permian	14	England, Scotland, Wales
Waterhead Group	Silurian	19	Scotland
Wealden Group	Cretaceous	07	England, English Channel
Wentnor Group	Ediacaran	25	England
West Sole Group	Jurassic	09	North Sea
Westray Group	Palaeogene/Neogene	04	Scotland, North Sea
Whitehurst Group	Carboniferous	15	
Yesnaby Sandstone Group	Devonian	17	Scotland
Yoredale Group	Carboniferous	15	England, Scotland
Zechstein Group	Permian	13	England, Atlantic, North Sea

== Supergroups ==
The following 'supergroups', i.e. assemblages of 'groups', are recognised:

- Carboniferous Limestone Supergroup
- Culm Supergroup
- Dalradian Supergroup
- Great Britain Superficial Deposits Supergroup
- Leadhills Supergroup
- Loch Ness Supergroup
- Longmyndian Supergroup
- Moine Supergroup - deprecated
- New Red Sandstone Supergroup
- Old Red Sandstone Supergroup
- Pebidian Supergroup
- Wester Ross Supergroup
- Windermere Supergroup

== Subgroups ==
The following 'subgroups', i.e. subdivisions of 'groups', have been named:

Albion Glacigenic Group:

- Shetland Glacigenic (Albion) Subgroup
- Western Isles (Albion) Glacigenic Subgroup
- Northwest Highlands (Albion) Glacigenic Subgroup
- Banffshire Coast and Caithness (Albion) Glacigenic Subgroup
- Inverness (Albion) Glacigenic Subgroup
- East Grampian (Albion) Glacigenic Subgroup
- Logie-Buchan (Albion) Glacigenic Subgroup
- Central Grampian (Albion) Glacigenic Subgroup
- Mearns (Albion) Glacigenic Subgroup
- Midland Valley (Albion) Glacigenic Subgroup
- Borders (Albion) Glacigenic Subgroup
- Southern Uplands (Albion) Glacigenic Subgroup
- Irish Sea Coast (Albion) Glacigenic Subgroup
- Manx (Albion) Glacigenic Subgroup
- Central Cumbria (Albion) Glacigenic Subgroup
- North Pennine (Albion) Glacigenic Subgroup
- North Sea Coast (Albion) Glacigenic Subgroup
- Wales (Albion) Glacigenic Subgroup

Appin Group:

- Blair Atholl Subgroup
- Ballachulish Subgroup
- Lochaber Subgroup

Ardmillan Group:

- Ardwell Subgroup
- Drummuck Subgroup
- Whitehouse Subgroup

Argyll Group:

- Tayvallich Subgroup
- Crinan Subgroup
- Easdale Subgroup
- Islay Subgroup

Badenoch Group:

- Dava Subgroup
- Glen Banchor Subgroup

Britannia Catchments Group:

- Northern Highlands and Argyll Catchments Subgroup
- Grampian Catchments Subgroup
- Tay Catchments Subgroup
- Forth Catchments Subgroup
- Clyde Catchments Subgroup
- Tweed Catchments Subgroup
- Solway Catchments Subgroup
- Northumbria Catchments Subgroup
- Isle of Man Catchments Subgroup
- Cheshire-North Wales Catchments Subgroup
- Yorkshire Catchments Subgroup
- Trent Catchments Subgroup
- Severn and Avon Catchments Subgroup
- West Wales Catchments Subgroup
- Ouse-Nene Catchments Subgroup
- Yare Catchments Subgroup
- Somerset Catchments Subgroup
- Thames Catchments Subgroup
- Suffolk Catchments Subgroup
- Cornubian Catchments Subgroup
- Solent Catchments Subgroup
- Sussex Catchments Subgroup
- South Kent Catchments Subgroup

Grampian Group

- Glen Spean Subgroup
- Corrieyairack Subgroup
- Glenshirra Subgroup

Caledonia Glacigenic Group:

- Shetland Glacigenic Subgroup
- Western Isles Glacigenic Subgroup
- Northwest Highlands Glacigenic Subgroup
- Banffshire Coast and Caithness Glacigenic Subgroup
- Inverness Glacigenic Subgroup
- East Grampian Glacigenic Subgroup
- Logie-Buchan Glacigenic Subgroup
- Central Grampian Glacigenic Subgroup
- Mearns Glacigenic Subgroup
- Midland Valley Glacigenic Subgroup
- Borders Glacigenic Subgroup
- Southern Uplands Glacigenic Subgroup
- Irish Sea Coast Glacigenic Subgroup
- Manx Glacigenic Subgroup
- Central Cumbria Glacigenic Subgroup
- North Pennine Glacigenic Subgroup
- North Sea Coast Glacigenic Subgroup
- Wales Glacigenic Subgroup

Lower Old Red Sandstone Group:

- Brecon Subgroup
- Cosheston Subgroup
- Ditton Subgroup
- Downton Subgroup
- Milford Haven Subgroup

Pembroke Limestone Group:

- Blackrock Limestone Subgroup
- Clydach Valley Subgroup

Ogwen Group

- Nant Ffrancon Subgroup
