= Geology of Northumberland National Park =

Overview of geology of a UK national park

The geology of Northumberland National Park in northeast England includes a mix of sedimentary, intrusive and extrusive igneous rocks from the Palaeozoic and Cenozoic eras. Devonian age volcanic rocks and a granite pluton form the Cheviot massif. The geology of the rest of the national park is characterised largely by a thick sequence of sedimentary rocks of Carboniferous age. These are intruded by Permian dykes and sills, of which the Whin Sill makes a significant impact in the south of the park. Further dykes were intruded during the Palaeogene period. The whole is overlain by unconsolidated sediments from the last ice age and the post-glacial period.

The exploitation of various of these rocks and deposits has contributed to economic activity in the area and left a number of legacies in the landscape. Various archaeological and historical sites are associated with the geological landscape, not least Hadrian's Wall built in large part by the Romans along the outcrop of the Whin Sill. This landscape and that of the Cheviot Hills were key to the area's designation as a national park in 1956.

== Underlying geological structure ==
The national park sits astride the Iapetus suture, the line along which the former Iapetus Ocean closed during the Silurian period as the former micro-continent of Avalonia to the south collided with the continent of Laurentia to the north. The suture and the great slab of subducted oceanic crust from beneath the former ocean are concealed from view by a thickness of sedimentary rocks which subsequently accumulated over the area. During the Devonian period a granite pluton was emplaced in the north (under what is now the Cheviot Hills) and volcanic activity led to the accumulation of various volcanic rocks whilst to the south (under what is now the North Pennines, a granite batholith was emplaced.

During the Carboniferous period, a series of blocks and basins developed across what would eventually become northern England. An upstanding Cheviot Block and an upstanding Alston Block were separated by the Solway-Basin – Northumberland Trough

== Silurian ==
Greywackes originating during the Wenlock epoch (428 – 422 Ma bp) of the Silurian Period are assigned to the Riccarton Group and occupy an area either side of the border with Scotland to the north of Byrness. The rocks exposed in the Coquet Head inlier are turbidites.

== Devonian ==
=== Old Red Sandstone ===
The late Devonian Stratheden Group is characterised by sandstones with subordinate siltstones and mudstones. A couple of very small areas of these rocks straddle the border to the southwest of The Cheviot.

=== Igneous rocks ===
Rocks assigned to the Cheviot Volcanic Formation, itself within the Reston Group, straddle the border with Scotland. This thick pile (over 1000m) of andesitic lavas was erupted during the early Devonian. The sequence includes rhyolites, agglomerates and tuff. The Cheviot Pluton is a mass of Devonian granite.

=== Metamorphic rock ===
The intense heat associated with the Cheviot pluton has led to the thermal metamorphism of rocks within its aureole. Hornfelsed volcanic rocks form tors within the Cheviot massif as at The Schil and Auchope Cairn.

== Carboniferous ==
Sedimentary rocks of Carboniferous age underlie the southern two-thirds of the national park. The oldest of these rocks within the park are assigned to the Inverclyde Group. Overlying these are the rocks of the Border Group and the youngest ones within the park are assigned to the overlying Yoredale Group.

=== Inverclyde Group ===
The Inverclyde Group extends into the park in places along its northeastern margin.

=== Border Group ===
Rocks of the Border Group extend west from Rothbury to the northern end of Kielder Water. The group is divided into a lower Lyne Formation and an upper Fell Sandstone Formation. The former is absent in the park but the latter reaches up to 370m thickness and is locally prominent around Rothbury Forest where it also forms the Simonside Hills which reach a height of 440m at Tosson Hill. In some areas it forms bold crags such as those at Bowden Doors.

=== Yoredale Group ===
The Yoredale Group comprises, in stratigraphic order i.e. lowermost/oldest first, the Tyne Limestone Formation, Alston Formation and Stainmore Formation. This succession is formed from mudstones, siltstones, sandstones and limestone. The Tyne Limestone occupies a large area around Otterburn, Bellingham and Kielder Reservoir extending west to the Cumbrian border. The overlying Alston Formation extends south from the Scottish border along the coastal strip before turning inland through Alnwick towards Greenhead. It plays host to the intrusive Whin Sill.

== Permian ==
The tholeiitic basalt of the Whin Sill was emplaced during early Permian times. The quartz-dolerite was emplaced within lower Carboniferous bedrock in a sheet which extends south and east fromjust within the southern margin of the park. It is typically 30m thick. A series of dyke sub-swarms is associated with the sill. Those within Northumberland are referred to as the Holy Island, High Green and St. Oswald's subswarms. The sill provides the extended north-facing scarp on which the Roman emperor Hadrian had his eponymous wall built. This sill is considered the original sill within geological science; sill is a local term for a broadly flat-lying body of rock and is now used for igneous intrusions parallel to bedding on a worldwide basis.

== Palaeogene ==
Numerous dykes of Palaeogene age cut the sedimentary rocks of the county. The most significant is the Acklington Dyke which running roughly east-southeastwards from the vicinity of the Scottish town of Hawick parallels the course of the Coquet, running just north of Rothbury and through the village of Acklington towards the coast. The dyke which occasionally achieves a width of 30m emanates from a source in the Mull igneous centre in the west of Scotland.

== Quaternary ==
=== Glacial legacy ===
Much of the park is mantled by glacial till from the last i.e. Devensian glaciation. There are also a number of areas of glacio-fluvial sands and gravels representing glacially derived material re-worked by rivers. All of this material, till and glacio-fluvial deposits, is assigned to the Caledonia Glacigenic Group; within the park, several different sub-groups are recognised according to the source of the material. North of the Cheviot massif, the till is assigned to the Borders Subgroup and to the south to the North Pennine Subgroup whilst that associated with the massif itself is classed as Cheviot Subgroup. The Pennine tills are generally dark grey reflecting the nature of the Carboniferous bedrock from which they largely originate.

Numerous glacial meltwater channels occur in the area between Ingram and Alwinton.

=== Peat ===
Large parts of the national park's uplands are blanketed by peat.

=== Alluvium ===
The floors of the main river valleys are formed by alluvium, sand, silts and gravel laid down by rivers and streams. River terraces are evident along the Tyne valley and three terraces are developed along that of the River Tweed. Terraces are also developed along the course of the Till, Aln, Coquet, Font, Wansbeck and Breamish.

== Geological conservation and protection ==
Northumberland National Park Authority engaged the British Geological Survey to carry out a geodiversity audit of the national park and the subsequent publication in 2007 of a geodiversity action plan was the first for any national park in the UK. It identified 38 geodiversity sites in addition to existing designated sites.

== See also ==
- Geology of the United Kingdom
- Geology of England
