= Cwmystwyth Grits Group =

Geological group in mid Wales

- Stratigraphic range: early Silurian (Llandovery)
- Type: Group
- Underlies: Dolgau Mudstones Formation
- Overlies: Claerwen Group

Lithology
- Primary: sandstones
- Other: mudstones

Location
- Region: mid Wales
- Country: Wales

Type section
- Named for: Cwmystwyth (village)

The Cwmystwyth Grits Group is a Silurian lithostratigraphic group (a sequence of rock strata) in mid Wales. The name is derived from the village of Cwmystwyth near Devil's Bridge in Ceredigion. The Group comprises the Blaen Myherin Mudstones Formation, the Glanyrafon Formation (upper and lower tongues), the Caerau Mudstones Formation, the Rhuddnant Grits Formation (including the Llyn Teifi Member) and the Pysgotwr Grits Formation.

== Outcrops ==
The rocks are intermittently exposed in mid Wales between Cwmystwyth, Llanidloes and Claerwen reservoir.

== Lithology and stratigraphy ==
The Group comprises hundreds of metres thickness of sandstones with subordinate mudstone turbidites laid down in the marine Welsh Basin during the Llandovery epoch.
