= Cymru terrane =

Inferred fault bounded terrane of the basement rocks of the southern United Kingdom

Proterozoic eon

Geologic timescale of the Proterozoic
- (millions of years ago)

The Cymru terrane is one of five inferred fault bounded terranes that make up the basement rocks of the southern United Kingdom. The other notable geological terranes are the Charnwood, Fenland, Wrekin and the Monian Composite terranes. In this article the definition of terrane is that implying rocks associated with the composition of the Precambrian basement. The Cymru terrane is bounded to the northwest by the Menai Strait Fault System and to the southeast by the Pontesford Lineament. The geological terrane to the west is the Monian Composite terrane and to the east is Wrekin terrane. The majority of rocks in the area are associated with the outcrops that are evident at the faulted boundaries.

The Proterozoic rocks of the Cymru terrane are typified in North Wales by the Arfon Group, Sarn Complex and the Twt Hill Granite. The former is in the Bangor area (S & SW) with the latter two located on the Llŷn Peninsula. The St Davids Granophyre and the Pebidian Supergroup are located on the coastline of St Davids Peninsula. Inferred Proterozoic volcanic deposits are noted in the Bryn-Teg Borehole (Trawsfynydd, Gwynedd).

The Padarn Tuff, which is thought to be contemporaneous with the Sarn Complex, is unconformable with the overlying Fachwen Formation and the unconformity has been constrained with dates noted of 604.7 Ma+/-1.6Ma from the tuffs and 572.5 Ma+/-1.2Ma from the Fachwen Formation. Information on the basement is somewhat sparse with no zircons noted to be older than 617 to 638 Ma. However, there are outcrops of the Parwyd Gneiss which are retrogressed granitoid gneiss and garnet amphibolite that occur with the Llyn Shear Zone. This is conjectured to be one of two probabilities, either as an exotic sliver, or as a metamorphic slice from the Monian Composite terrane. The Granitoid Gneiss has Sm-Nd ages of 1350 Ma which is in the same temporal region as the Sarn Granite

== Intrusive geology ==
=== St David's Granophyre ===
In the southwest of Wales is the St Davids Granophyre the stratigraphical relationship of which was subject of heated debates towards the end of the 19th Century predominantly between Sir Archibald Geikie and Henry Hicks. Geikie (then director of the Geological Survey) insisted upon the Pebidian Supergroup and the high-level intrusion being placed in the Cambrian sequence with Hicks taking the opposing view and suggesting that the Granophyre which cross cuts the Pebidian Supergroup should be placed in the Precambrian and by consequence placing the Pebidian Supergroup in the Precambrian. The issue was finally resolved by Green by revealing, in an excavation, an unconformity in which an excavation of a Cambrian basal conglomerate is shown to cut the granophyre.

The St David's Granophyre has historically been incorrectly assigned to be alaskite or trondhjemite due to low concentrations of potassium feldspar but this has been shown to be an alteration product from its original calc-alkaline granite which is noted to exhibit a volcanic arc signature. Correlation of the granophyric intrusion with the Arfon Group rather than the nearby Coomb Volcanic Formation has been suggested with a tentative U-Pb isotopic age of 625+/-25Ma being suggested.

=== Sarn Complex ===
The largest plutonic body in the terrane has limited outcrop and is sheared by the Llyn Shear Zone in the west and covered by later (Arenig) sediments to the east. Altered to Greenschist facies the pluton contains a bimodal suite of gabbro-diorite, monzogranite (Sarn Granite) and granodiorite.

The Sarn Granite is leucocratic and covers an expanse of c.6 km^2 in contrast to the gabbro and diorite that exist as small and scattered exposures. The dioritic component has been confirmed as having a Neoproterozoic age of 614Ma+/-2Ma using U-Pb Zircon dating. So therefore, the shearing of the Llyn is also temporally constrained by the date.

=== Twt Hill Granite ===
This is a small fine-grained, leucocratic intrusive body that cuts the Padarn Tuff at the western end of the Bangor-Caernarfon Ridge.

== Volcano-sedimentary geology ==
The thick sequences of volcano-sedimentary facies are present in North Wales (as the Arfon Group) and South Wales (as the Pebidian Supergroup) and are generally considered to be coeval but are geochemically distinct, showing acidic and basic qualities respectively. Both are cut by minor granitic intrusions.

The Pebidian Supergroup is interbedded basic lavas and acid tuffs, is cut by the St David's Granophyre. There is evidence presented that subaerial and subaqueous deposition has occurred in a Welsh Basin that is likely to have been undergoing varying rates of subsidence thus promoting aerial emergence. Greenschist alteration is in keeping with the regional metamorphism that is characteristic of Welsh Neoproterozoic rocks.

In the Pebidian Supergroup the basal unit is largely basaltic and exhibits columnar jointing, autobrecciated lavas, scoriaceous and fine grained tuffs. The volcano-sediments have an increased acid component until the uppermost beds of the unit exhibit the basaltic influence once again. Such information is preserved in the Rhosson Group as autobrecciated lava, tuffs and scoria deposits.

=== The Arfon Group ===
This volcano-sedimentary group incorporates over 4000m of deposits and were previously considered to be of Cambrian age. U-Pb data suggests that the whole succession is indeed Precambrian Neoproterozoic age. Exposure of the lower unit (Padarn Tuff) is exhibited on a ridge between Bangor and Caernarfon and also on a ridge near Llyn Padarn This is noted to be a thick sequence of acid ash flow tuffs and exhibits welding and are thought to be rapid deposition of thin air-fall tuffs and rhyolite flows placed in a bounded half-graben (or graben) . Isotope data shows a U-Pb zircon from the lower part of the succession as 614+/-2Ma and 604.7+/-1.6Ma confirms a Neoproterozoic age.

=== Minfordd and Bangor Formations ===
These strata have an angular and discordant relationship with both formations having variable thickness controlled by bounding fault lines that are likely to have controlled the depositional regime of the rocks. The formations exist to the west of the Aber Dinlle Fault. The Minfordd Formation is a sandstone dominated epiclastic and tuffaceous lithology which has a broad upward fining sequence with the presence of thick welded and non-welded ash-flow tuffs that elucidates an amount of volcanism. The basal rocks of the Minfordd Formation contain clasts of granite, vein quartz, quartzitic sandstone, quartzose schists and were thought to be Cambrian basal conglomerate. The Bangor Formation overlies the Minfordd Formation and it underlies the Llanberis Slates and is a similar lithology to the Minfordd Formation excepting the basal conglomerate.

=== Fachwen Formation ===
This is thought to be the lateral equivalent of the Bangor and Minfordd Formations on the eastern side of the Aber Dinelle Fault. The Fachwen and Bangor Formations are both dominated by acidic volcanic deposits but they also contain minor basic tuffs that preserve scoria textures which suggest a proximal source.

=== Bwlch Gwyn Tuff ===
This outcrops mainly on Anglesey but a sliver of it also occurs along the Berw Fault and its properties are similar to that of the Arfon Group ash-flow tuff and as such constrain the docking of the western Monian Composite terrane. Although evidence can be interpreted to the contrary as the Bwlch Gwyn outcrop may be faulted post-Berw and pre-Arenig.

== Boreholes ==
The Bryn-teg borehole is located near Trawsfynydd in the Harlech Dome and exhibits over 140 m of Neoproterozoic rocks. There is a sharp erosional contact with the Cambrian Dolwen Formation.

== Palaeontology ==
No Ediacaran fauna has been found in the Welsh terrane to date. The age of the Bryn-teg Volcanic Formation is constrained by Lower Cambrian foraminifera in overlying beds. The Playsolenites cooperi are only otherwise known in the Placentian of SE Newfoundland.
