= Menevian Group =

Geological group in west Wales

- Stratigraphic range: St Davids Epoch Cambrian
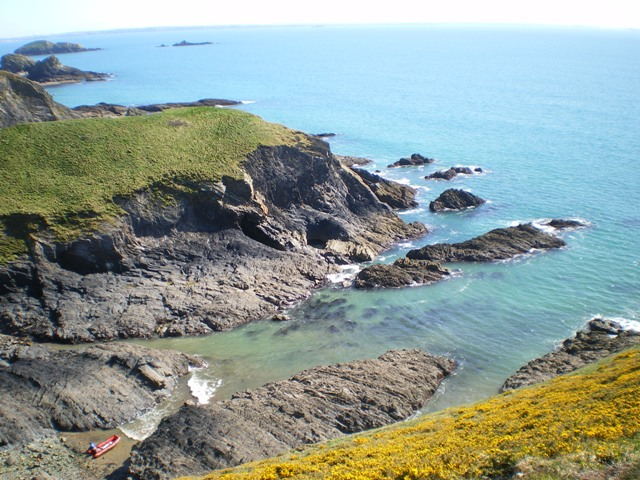
- Mudstones of the Menevia Formation exposed in Porth y Rhaw, west of Solva
- Type: Group
- Sub-units: Upper, Middle, Lower (informal)
- Underlies: Lingula Flags
- Overlies: Solva Group
- Thickness: about 230m

Lithology
- Primary: mudstones
- Other: tuffaceous sandstone

Location
- Region: South West Wales
- Country: Wales

Type section
- Named for: St Davids (Roman name for area)

The Menevian Group is a Cambrian lithostratigraphic group (a sequence of rock strata) in west Wales. The name is derived from Menevia, the Roman name for the St Davids area north of St Brides Bay on Pembrokeshire’s west coast where the strata are well exposed in coastal cliffs. This rock succession has previously been known variously as the Menevian Series and Menevian Beds and largely ascribed to the British regional stratigraphic unit St David’s Epoch, though these terms are now obsolete.

== Outcrops ==
The rock succession is exposed, along the coast southeast of St Davids and in particular at Solva where the outcrop, though largely concealed, continues inland. Both western and eastern cliff sections at Porth-y-Rhaw west of Solva provide the type locality. Further outcrops, though less well exposed, occur northeast of Newgale and again in the Wolf's Castle area.

== Lithology and stratigraphy ==
The Group comprises over two hundred metres thickness of mudstones and sandstones together with a basal conglomerate. The sandstones have been laid down as turbidites. Some of the mudstones contain tuff horizons whilst many are pyritous and have been equated with the Clogau Formation which crops out near Harlech, both indicating that the floor of the Welsh Basin was oxygen-poor and the waters were becoming deeper. Trilobite fossils are recorded throughout the sequence whilst the sandstones of the upper Menevian contain brachiopod fossils.
