= Solva Group =

Sedimentary sequence in Wales

- Stratigraphic range: St David's Epoch Cambrian
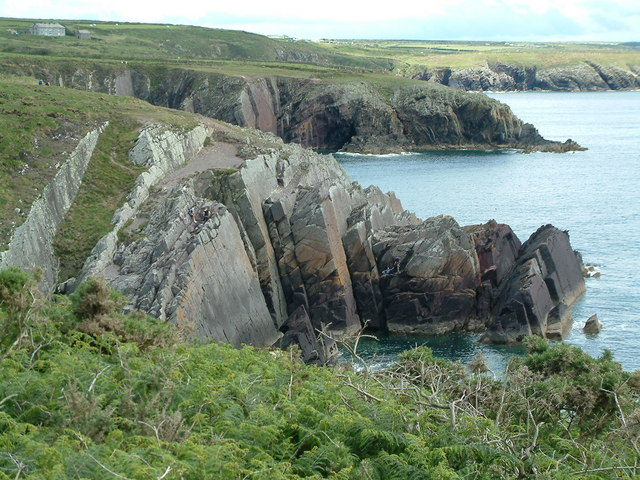
- Steeply-dipping sandstones of the Solva Group, just west of Porth Clais
- Type: Group
- Sub-units: Lower, Middle & Upper Solva (informal)
- Underlies: Menevian Group
- Overlies: Caerfai Group
- Thickness: about 500m

Lithology
- Primary: sandstones
- Other: mudstones

Location
- Region: west Wales
- Country: Wales

Type section
- Named for: Solva

The Solva Group is a Cambrian lithostratigraphic group (a sequence of rock strata) in west Wales. The name is derived from Solva on the west coast of Pembrokeshire where the strata are well exposed in coastal cliffs. This rock succession was formerly known as the Solva Series and ascribed to the British regional stratigraphic unit ‘’St David’s Epoch’’, though these terms are now obsolete.

== Outcrops ==
These rocks are exposed, along the north coast of St Brides Bay south of St Davids and in particular at Caer Bwdy Bay just southeast of the city where they are seen to overlie the Caerbwdy Sandstone Formation. They are exposed again in the sides of the ria at Solva and occur more widely inland of the village though exposures are less frequent. There are less extensive outcrops further west at St Justinian and on Ramsey Island. To the east they occur again north of Newgale and at Tancredston and to the west of Wolf's Castle.

== Lithology and stratigraphy ==
The Group comprises around five hundred metres thickness of occasionally pebbly, green and purple sandstones together with mudstones and siltstones. Trilobite, brachiopod and acritarch fossils are present. Trace fossils suggest that the sediments were laid down in shallow marine conditions though the thick middle sequence is characterized by turbidites and is much less fossiliferous.
