= Drefach Group =

Geological group in west Wales

- Stratigraphic range: early Ordovician
- Type: Group
- Sub-units: Mydrim Shales Formation, Mydrim Limestone Formation, Hendre Shales Formation, Asaphus Ash Formation, Felin-wen Formation
- Underlies: Nantmel Mudstones Formation
- Overlies: various formations

Lithology
- Primary: mudstones
- Other: turbidites, limestone, tuff

Location
- Region: west Wales
- Country: Wales

Type section
- Named for: Drefach (village)

The Drefach Group is an Ordovician lithostratigraphic group (a sequence of rock strata) in west Wales. The name is derived from the village of Drefach near Meidrim (a.k.a. Mydrim) in Carmarthenshire. The Group comprises the Mydrim Shales Formation, the Mydrim Limestone Formation, the Hendre Shales Formation, Asaphus Ash Formation and at its base, the underlying Felin-wen Formation.

== Outcrops ==
The rocks are intermittently exposed in a belt of country running east from Fishguard Bay via Crymych then south towards Meidrim thence east via the north of Carmarthen along the Vale of Towy to Llandeilo.

== Lithology and stratigraphy ==
The Group comprises in places more than a 400m thickness of mudstones (Mydrim Shales Formation), turbidite mudstones (Hendre Shales Formation), limestone (Mydrim Limestone Formation), tuffs and tuffites (Asaphus Formation) and more turbidite mudstones (Felin-wen Formation) laid down in the marine Welsh Basin during the Llanvirnian and Caradocian epochs of the Ordovician period.
