= Caerfai Bay =

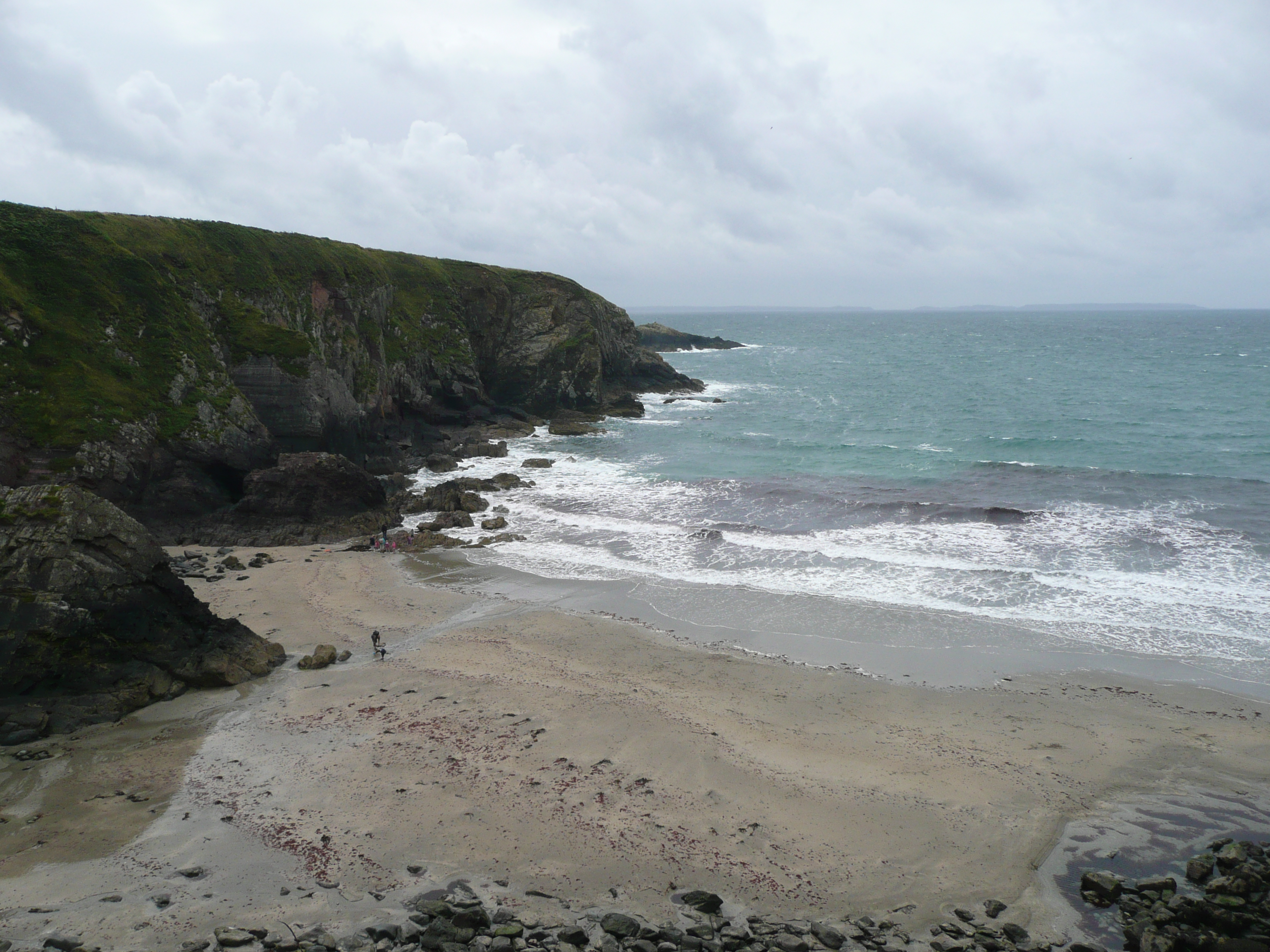
- Caerfai Bay

- Location within Pembrokeshire
- OS grid reference: SM 7606 2430
- Principal area: Pembrokeshire
- Preserved county: Dyfed
- Country: Wales
- Sovereign state: United Kingdom
- Post town: HAVERFORDWEST
- Postcode district: SA62
- Police: Dyfed-Powys
- Fire: Mid and West Wales
- Ambulance: Welsh

Caerfai Bay is a rocky cove on the north coast of St Brides Bay near St Davids in Pembrokeshire, West Wales. It is enclosed by steep varicoloured cliffs and has a sandy beach at low tide accessed by pathway and steps. The beach is situated in the Pembrokeshire Coast National Park and on the Pembrokeshire Coast Path. There is free parking above the beach with picnic benches and views of the islands of Skomer and Skokholm off the southern coast of St Brides and Penpleidiau islet off the southern point of the eastern Caerfai headland.

== Location ==
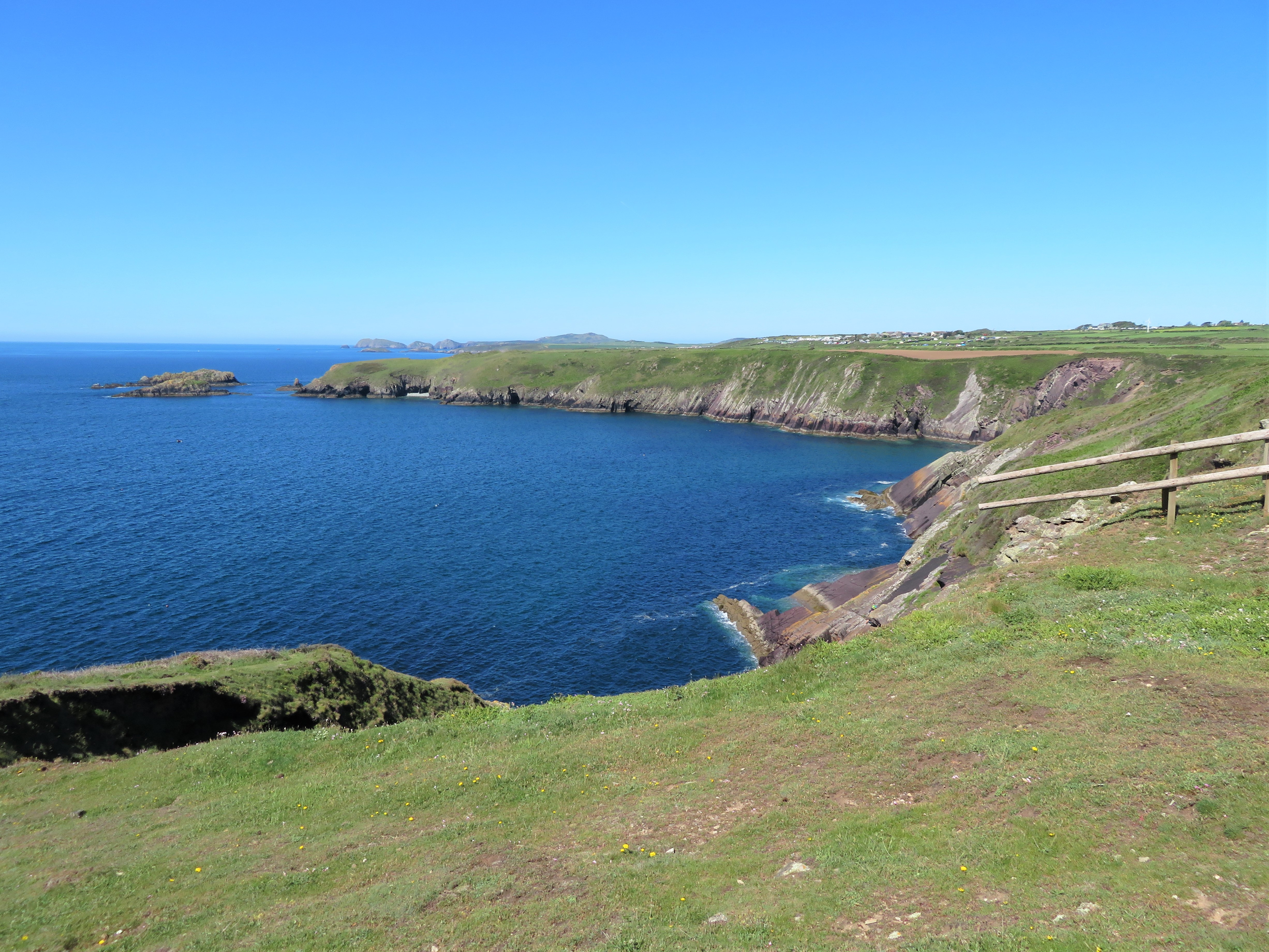
Caer Bwdy Bay looking southwestwards from Carreg y Barcud [Grid reference SM 77362 24228] towards Caerfai Bay. Penpleidiau headland and its islets in the near distance; The hills and islets of Ramsay Island are on the horizon.

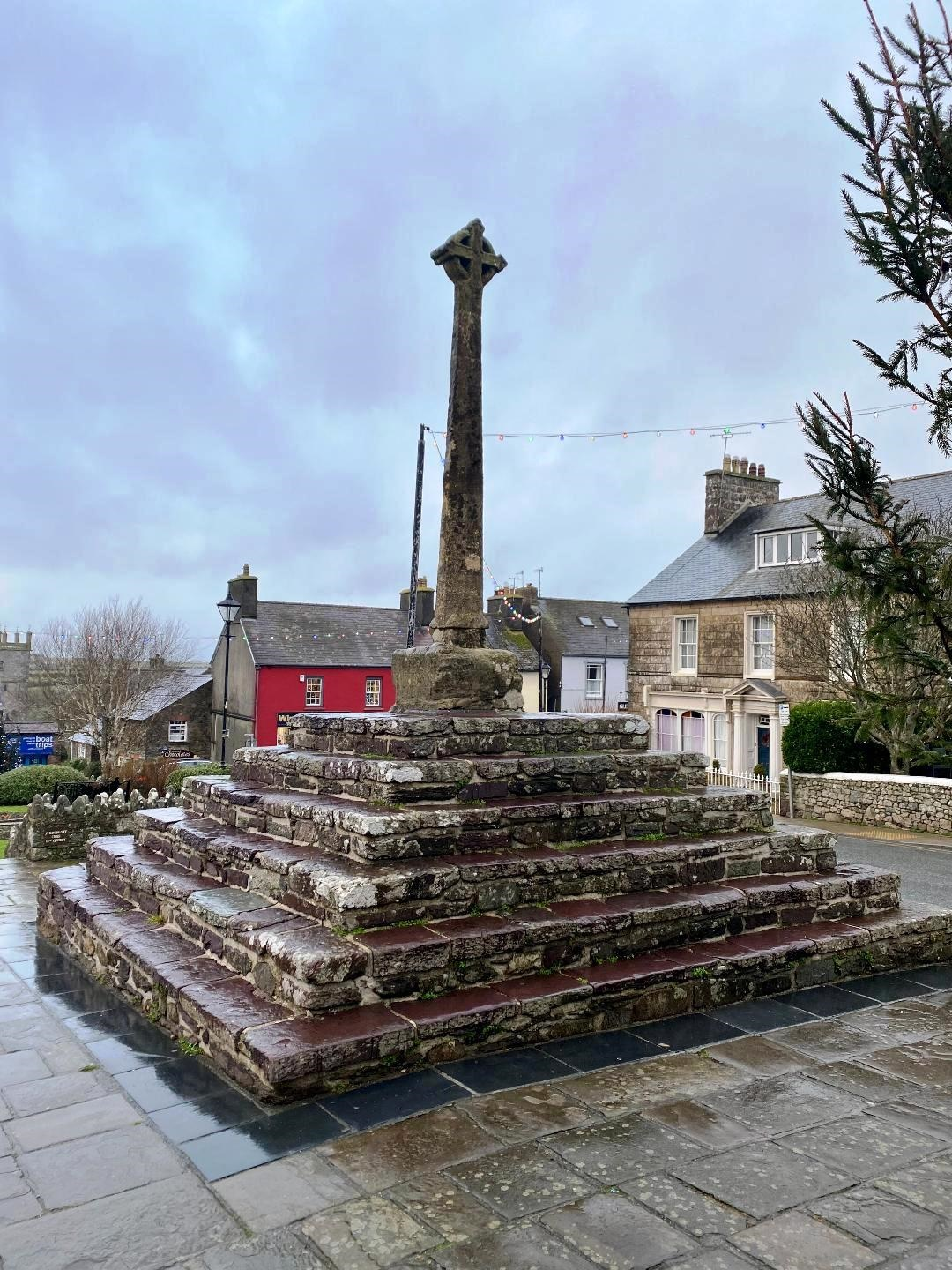
The medieval cross in St David's city centre which stands on a comparatively recent stepped base constructed of purple 'Caer bwdy Sandstone'.

Caerfai beach is only 1.4 kilometres (0.87 mi) from centre of the cathedral city of St Davids.

Along the coast to the west is the Chapel of St Non (51.8722°N 5.2688°W), a ruin said to be the 6th-century birthplace of the patron saint of Wales, St David, and named after his Mother. Approximately 150 metres east of the ruin and adjacent to the Retreat is the modern Chapel of Our Lady and St Non (51.8724°N 5.2667°W), the most westerly fully functioning Catholic chapel in Wales and also one of the smallest. However, the most westerly chapel ruin in Wales is not that of St Non, but that of St Justinian (51.8793°N 5.3087°W) overlooking Ramsay Sound almost 2.97 kilometres (1.85 mi) to the WNW and situated above the old St Davids Lifeboat Station.

On the eastern Caerfai headland are ramparts of the Iron Age fort of Castell Penpleidiau which separates Caerfai from Caer Bwdy, the next bay to the east. Excavations by DigVentures in 2021 were the first ever recorded on the site.

== Commercial activity ==
Caerfai Bay Caravan and Tent Park which started in the 1930s is open between March and November and has static hire, touring and camping pitches which overlook Caerfai Bay. Caerfai Farm is 140 acres (0.57 km^{2}) producing organic milk, cheeses and potatoes using sustainable energy sources, including solar, geothermal, wind and biomass energy. The farm also has a seasonal shop and a campsite.

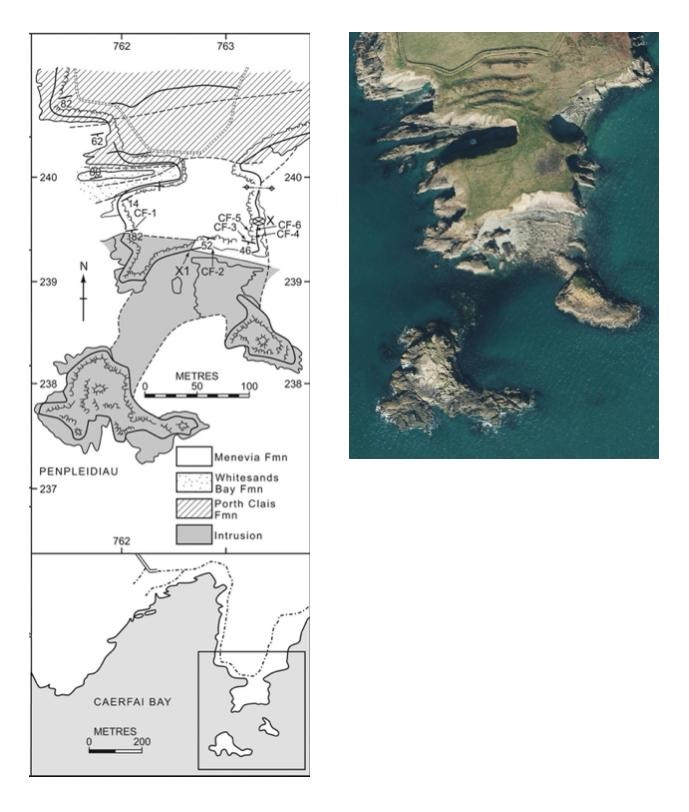
Simplified geological map of Penpleidiau headland, Caerfai Bay.

== Geology ==
Both western and eastern cliff sections display distinctive red, purple and greenish mudstone, siltstone and sandstone formations representing parts of the Caerfai and Porth-y-rhaw geological Groups of Lower to Middle Cambrian age.

The southern tip of the eastern Penpleidiau headland and its small islets are composed of dolerite, an Intrusive igneous rock. The intrusion is in sharp sill-like contact with baked fossiliferous Middle Cambrian (Drumian) mudstones from within the lower part of the Menevia Formation. Trilobite fossils found within the Menevia Formation at Penpleudiau include Ptychagnostus (s. l.) barrandei (Hicks), Condylopyge cf. rex (Barrande), Peronopsis scutalis cf. exarata (Grönwall), Tomagnostus fissus (Lundgren in Linnarsson), T. brantevikensis Weidner and Nielsen, T. cf. perrugatus (Grönwall), Mawddachites hicksii (Salter), Paradoxides (s. l.) illingi Lake, Centropleura pugnax Illing, Parasolenopleura? elegans (Illing), and Holocephalites incerta (Illing). Inarticulate brachiopods [Linnarssonia sagittalis (Davidson) and Lingulella sp.], Hyolithes sp. and Protospongia sp. are also recorded.

These fossils enable correlation with Illing's (1916) Paradoxides hicksii fauna in the Abbey Shale Formation of Nuneaton, Warwickshire, England and with the Tomagnostus fissus Biozone of Scandinavian biostratigraphic terminology (Rees et al., op. cit.).

There are disused quarries below the car park and at Caer Bwdy Bay, the latter providing purple sandstone used in the original construction of St Davids Cathedral and for its more recent stonework renovation during the 1980s. Distinctive purple-coloured sandstone of the Caer Bwdy Bay Formation (Rees et al., op cit. p. 53) was also used in the construction of the stepped mount supporting the medieval stone cross in the centre of St David's at Cross Square (51.8811°N 5.2656°W) .

== See also ==
- Caerfai Group
