= Fishguard Volcanic Group =

Lithostratigraphic group in west Wales

- Stratigraphic range: middle Ordovician
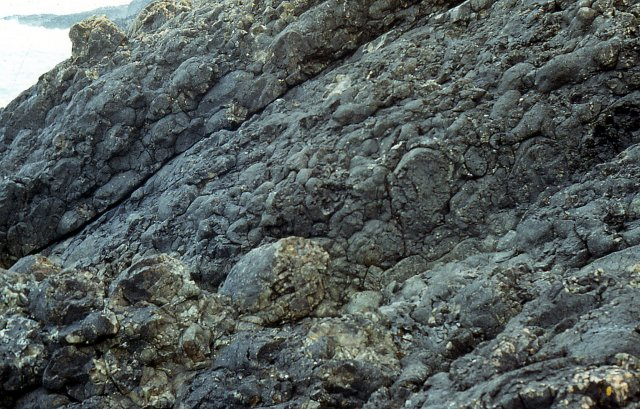
- Pillow lavas at Strumble Head, Strumble Head Volcanic Formation
- Type: Group
- Sub-units: Goodwick Volcanic Formation, Strumble Head Volcanic Formation, Porth Maen Melyn Volcanic Formation
- Underlies: unconformity
- Overlies: Aber Mawr Formation

Lithology
- Primary: lavas
- Other: breccias, tuffs, volcaniclastic sediments

Location
- Region: west Wales
- Country: Wales

Type section
- Named for: Fishguard

The Fishguard Volcanic Group is an Ordovician lithostratigraphic group (a sequence of rock strata) in west Wales. The name is derived from the town of Fishguard in Pembrokeshire. This assemblage of rocks has also been referred to as the Fishguard Volcanic Series or Fishguard Volcanic Complex. These rocks are believed to be the source of the 'bluestones' which form a part of the well-known prehistoric monument of Stonehenge in southern England.

== Outcrops ==
The rocks are intermittently exposed in a belt of country running east from Strumble Head on the Cardigan Bay coast, through Fishguard and wrapping around the northern flanks of Mynydd Preseli to the south of the village of Newport to the vicinity of Crymych.

== Lithology and stratigraphy ==
The group comprises about 1800 m thickness of lavas, breccias tuffs and associated volcaniclastic sediments laid down in the marine Welsh Basin during the Llanvirnian stage of the Ordovician Period. The group includes (in descending order, i.e. oldest last) the Goodwick Volcanic Formation, the Strumble Head Volcanic Formation and the Porth Maen Melyn Volcanic Formation. Previous names for these divisions which may be found in the literature are 'Upper Rhyolite Division', 'Pillow-lava Division' and 'Lower Rhyolite Division. The Llanrian Volcanic Formation is recognised within the Strumble Head area. It is composed of acid tuffs.
