= Reston Group =

Geologic group in Great Britain

- Stratigraphic range: Ludlow epoch Silurian to early Devonian epoch
- Type: Group
- Underlies: Stratheden Group
- Overlies: unconformable on lower Palaeozoic rocks
- Thickness: up to 2350m

Lithology
- Primary: conglomerates
- Other: sandstones, siltstones, mudstones, volcanics

Location
- Country: Scotland, England
- Extent: across Southern Uplands

Type section
- Named for: Reston, Scottish Borders

The Reston Group is a Silurian to Devonian lithostratigraphic group (a sequence of rock strata) in the Southern Uplands terrane of southern Scotland and northernmost England. The name is derived from Reston in the Scottish Borders. The rocks of the Reston Group have also previously been referred to as 'Lower Old Red Sandstone and Lavas'
