= Topostratigraphy =

Topostratigraphy (Swedish: topostratigrafi) is a method of establishing stratigraphical units based on a mix of biostratigraphy and lithostratigraphy. It is used locally in the Baltic region to study the Ordovician-aged sedimentary rock. In topostratigraphy the ages of units is defined with the aid of fossils and their extent is known from their rock type. The concept works better in Ordovician rocks in Estonia than in Sweden. This is because in Ordovician rock outcrops of Estonia changes in biostratigraphy are usually matched by changes in lithostratigraphy. In Sweden topostratigraphical units are mostly based on biostratigraphy as lithological variations are few, making topostratigraphy problematic as units are named after lithology.

Having been in use since the 1950s the term was introduced into Swedish in 1960 by Swedish-Estonian geologist Valdar Jaanusson. As of 2011 topostratigraphy was being replaced as a method but had still some significance due to its historical usage. The Committee for Swedish Stratigraphic Nomenclature of the Royal Swedish Academy of Sciences argues against its use.
