= Meadfoot Group =

Geologic group in England

- Stratigraphic range: Pragian to Emsian (Devonian)
- Type: Group
- Sub-units: Staddon Formation, Bovisand Formation
- Underlies: Staddon Grits
- Overlies: Dartmouth Group

Lithology
- Primary: shales,
- Other: siltstones, sandstones

Location
- Region: England
- Country: United Kingdom
- Extent: south Devon

Type section
- Named for: Meadfoot, Torquay

The Meadfoot Group is an early Devonian lithostratigraphic group (a sequence of rock strata) in south Devon of southwest England. The name is derived from the locality of Meadfoot at Torquay. The Group comprises (in ascending order i.e. oldest first) the Staddon and Bovisand formations. It was formerly known as the Meadfoot Beds or Series.
