= Ravenstonedale Group =

- Stratigraphic range: Courceyan to Holkerian substages of Carboniferous
- Type: Group
- Sub-units: Raydale Dolomite, Marsett and Penny Farm Gill formations
- Underlies: Orton Group
- Overlies: Silurian Bannisdale Slates
- Thickness: up to 380m

Lithology
- Primary: limestone, oolite
- Other: sandstone, shale

Location
- Region: Northern England
- Country: England

Type section
- Named for: Ravenstonedale

The Ravenstonedale Group is a Carboniferous lithostratigraphic group (a sequence of rock strata) in the Pennines of northern England. The name is derived from the locality of Ravenstonedale in southeast Cumbria. The rocks of the Ravenstonedale Group have also previously been referred to as the Ravenstonedale Limestone. The group comprises limestones and oolites and some sandstones and shales which reach a maximum thickness of 380m in the Brough area. It is divided into a lower Raydale Dolomite Formation which is overlain by the Marsett Formation and then by an upper Penny Farm Gill Formation.Its base is everywhere an unconformity with Ordovician and Devonian rocks beneath.
