= Pebidian Supergroup =

Geological group in Pembrokeshire, Wales

- Stratigraphic range: Ediacaran
- Type: Supergroup
- Sub-units: Treginnis, Treglemais & Penrhiw 'Groups', Caerbwdy Group, Ramsey Sound Group, Rhosson Group, Ogofgolchfa Group

Lithology
- Primary: tuffs
- Other: trachytes, lavas, conglomerates

Location
- Region: west Wales
- Country: Wales

Type section
- Named for: Pebidiauc
- Named by: Henry Hicks (geologist)

The Pebidian Supergroup is an Ediacaran (i.e. late Precambrian) lithostratigraphic supergroup (a sequence of rock strata) in Pembrokeshire, west Wales. The term 'Pebidian' (along with Dimetian) was coined by geologist Henry Hicks in 1876 and published in a scientific paper in the Quarterly Journal of the Geological Society in the following year. It was named for Pebidiauc, an ancient local name for the St Davids area.

== Outcrops ==
These rocks are exposed in the St David's peninsula in northwestern Pembrokeshire. One outcrop stretches east from Treginnis, wrapping around the north of St David's to Treglemais. Another underlies Hayscastle Cross with scattered outcrops elsewhere in the area.

== Lithology and stratigraphy ==
The supergroup comprises at its base the Treginnis, Treglemais and Penrhiw 'Groups' of the Lower Pebidian which include trachytic and andesitic tuffs and halleflinta. Overlying these are the tuffs, lavas and conglomerates of the Caerbwdy Group, Ramsey Sound Group and the Rhosson Group. Uppermost i.e. youngest is the Ogofgolchfa Group which includes slates and tuffs. This whole assemblage has also been referred to as the Pebidian Volcanic Complex or Pebidian Volcanic Series.
