= Dartmouth Group =

Geological formation in Great Britain

- Stratigraphic range: Lochkovian to Pragian (Devonian)
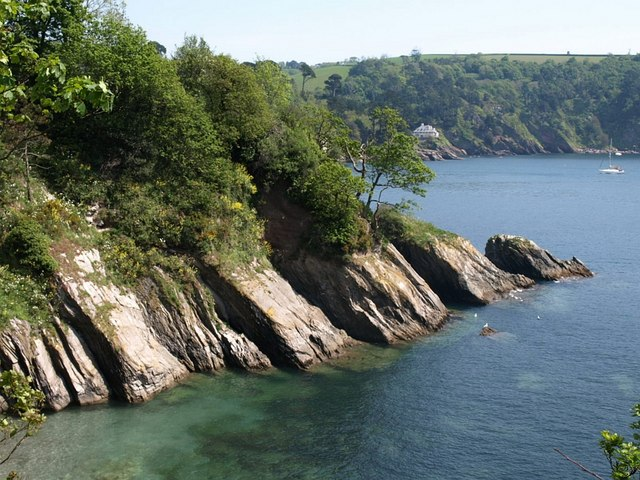
- Rocks of the Dartmouth group at Sugary Cove near Dartmouth
- Type: Group
- Sub-units: Whitsand Bay Formation, Bin Down Formation
- Underlies: Meadfoot Group
- Thickness: up to 3300m

Lithology
- Primary: mudstones,
- Other: siltstones, sandstones, basaltic lavas, tuffs, hyaloclastite

Location
- Region: England
- Country: United Kingdom
- Extent: north and east Cornwall to southeast Devon

Type section
- Named for: Dartmouth

The Dartmouth Group is an early Devonian lithostratigraphic group (a sequence of rock strata) from north and east Cornwall to southeast Devon in southwest England. The name is derived from the port of Dartmouth. The Group comprises (in ascending order i.e. oldest first) the Whitsand Bay and Bin Down formations. The type area is along the southeast coast of Cornwall. The sequence has had various earlier names including the Dartmouth Beds or Slates.
