= Caerfai Group =

Sedimentary sequence in Wales

- Stratigraphic range: Comley Epoch Cambrian
- Type: Group
- Sub-units: Ogof Golchfa, St Non’s, Caerfai Bay and Caer Bwdy Bay Formations
- Underlies: Porth-y-rhaw Group - Drumian Stage
- Overlies: Ogofgolchfa Group of Pebidian Supergroup
- Thickness: at least 564m.

Lithology
- Primary: sandstones
- Other: mudstone, conglomerate

Location
- Region: west Wales
- Country: Wales

Type section
- Named for: Caerfai Bay

The Caerfai Group is a Cambrian lithostratigraphic group (a sequence of rock strata) in west Wales. The name is derived from Caerfai Bay on the north coast of St Brides Bay on the Pembrokeshire coast where the strata are well exposed in coastal cliffs. This rock succession has previously been known variously as the Caerfai Series, Caerfai Formation and Caerfai Beds and largely ascribed to the British regional stratigraphic unit Comley Epoch, though these terms are now obsolete.

== Outcrops ==
The rock succession is exposed, along the coast south of St Davids and in particular at Caerfai and St Non’s bays to the south of the city where they are seen to overlie Precambrian volcaniclastic rocks of the Pebidian Supergroup. They are exposed again on the west-facing coast of the St Davids peninsula facing Ramsey Island. Further outcrops though less well exposed occur south of Croes-goch and north and east of Newgale and again in the Wolf's Castle area.

== Lithology and stratigraphy ==
The Group comprises around four hundred metres thickness of green and purplish-red micaceous feldspathic sandstones together with mudstones and a basal conglomerate. The sequence of the Caerfai Group is as follows:

- Porth Clais Formation
- Newgale Formation
- Caer Bwdy Bay Formation
- Caerfai Bay Formation
- St Non’s Formation
- Ogof Golchfa Formation

The basal conglomerate unconformably overlies slates and tuffs of the Ogofgolchfa Group of the Pedbidian. Radiometric studies have yielded ages of around 519 Ma for tuffs within the mudstone. Sedimentary structures and fossils present in the sequence suggest a shallow water depositional environment.
