= Stratheden Group =

Geological group in Great Britain

- Stratigraphic range: Late Devonian epoch
- Type: Group
- Sub-units: Burnside Sandstone Formation, Glenvale Sandstone Formation, Knox Pulpit Sandstone Formation, Bute Conglomerate Formation
- Underlies: Inverclyde Group
- Overlies: Strathmore Group, Arbuthnott-Garvock Group
- Thickness: up to 1500m

Lithology
- Primary: sandstone
- Other: mudstone, siltstone, conglomerates

Location
- Region: Europe
- Country: United Kingdom

Type section
- Named for: Stratheden, Fife

The Stratheden Group is a Devonian lithostratigraphic group (a sequence of rock strata) in southern Scotland and northernmost England. Occasionally pebbly, this red-brown and yellow sandstone dominated unit also contains siltstones and mudstones. It is encountered in Arran in the west and across the Midland Valley to the northeastern parts of Fife in the east. The name is derived from Stratheden in Fife. The rocks of the Stratheden Group have also previously been referred to as the Upper Old Red Sandstone. It unconformably overlies a variety of other rock sequences including the Strathmore Group around Dumbarton, Stirling and Arran and the Arbuthnott-Garvock Group in Fife and the Kinross area.
