= Heron Group =

Triassic alluvial lithostratigraphic group beneath the central and northern North Sea

- Stratigraphic range: Late Triassic Epoch
- Type: Group
- Overlies: Zechstein Group

Location
- Region: North Sea
- Country: Scotland

The Heron Group is a Triassic lithostratigraphic group (a sequence of rock strata) beneath the central and northern North Sea which is composed of alluvial deposits.
