= Aberystwyth Grits Group =

Geological group in Mid Wales

- Stratigraphic range: Llandovery Silurian
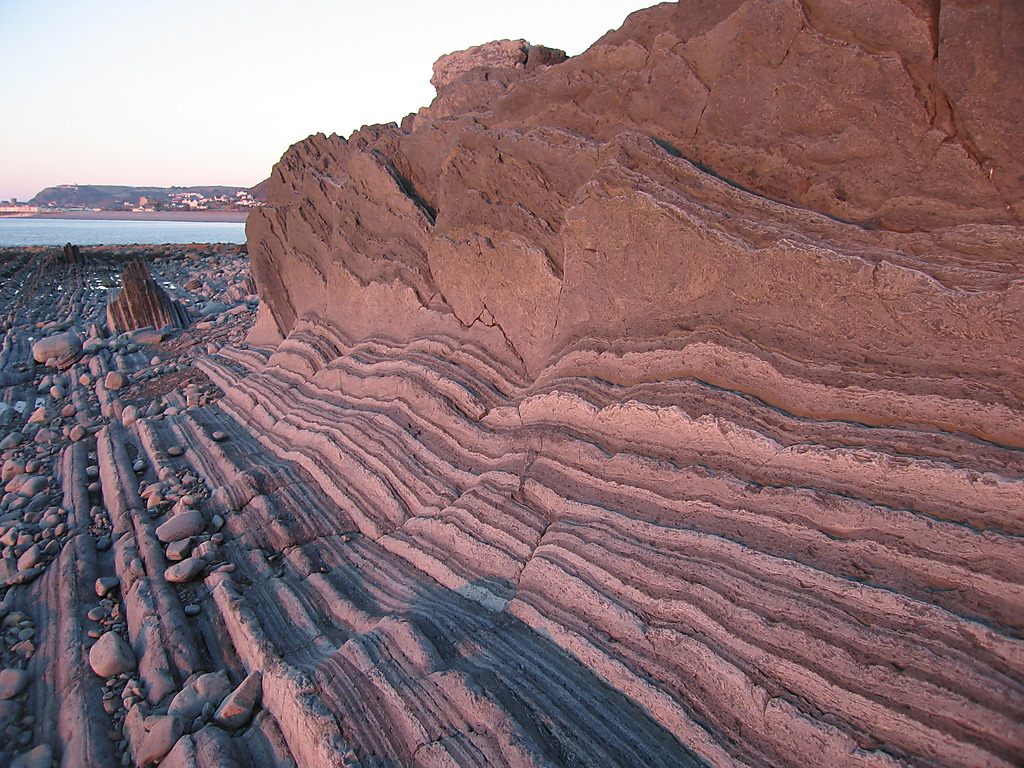
- Turbidite sandstones and interbedded mudstones of the Aberystwyth Grits Group exposed on the foreshore below Allt Wen, near Aberystwyth
- Type: Group
- Sub-units: Trefechan Formation, Mynydd Bach Formation
- Overlies: Borth Mudstones Formation

Lithology
- Primary: turbidite mudstones
- Other: sandstones

Location
- Region: mid Wales
- Country: Wales

Type section
- Named for: Aberystwyth

The Aberystwyth Grits Group is a Silurian lithostratigraphic group (a sequence of rock strata) in mid Wales. The name is derived from Aberystwyth in northern Ceredigion where the strata are well exposed in coastal cliffs. The Group comprises the Trefechan Formation and the underlying Mynydd Bach Formation. The rocks of the Aberystwyth Grits Group have also previously been known as the Aberystwyth Grits Formation

== Outcrops ==
These rocks are exposed, along the Cardigan Bay coast both to the east and west of New Quay and northwards through Aberaeron and Aberystwyth to just short of Borth. They extend eastwards, though are usually obscured, in a belt of country between roughly 5 km and 10 km wide reaching from the coast. Much of the eastern boundary is defined by the Bronnant Fault.

== Lithology and stratigraphy ==
The Group comprises several hundred metres thickness of mudstone and sandstone turbidites laid down in the marine Welsh Basin during the Llandovery epoch of the Silurian period. Palaeocurrents indicating a source in the southwest have been recorded from throughout the group.
