= Red Marl Group =

Geological group in Great Britain

- Stratigraphic range: Pridolian (Silurian) to Pragian (Devonian)
- Type: Group
- Underlies: Senni Formation
- Thickness: circa 1100m

Lithology
- Primary: siltstones, mudstones
- Other: sandstones

Location
- Country: Wales, England
- Extent: Pembrokeshire to Clwyd to Staffordshire to Gloucestershire and Lancashire

The Red Marl Group is a late Silurian to early Devonian lithostratigraphic group (a sequence of rock strata) in Wales, Staffordshire, Lancashire and Gloucestershire. The Group which was first established in the early twentieth century, includes the modern-day Temeside Mudstone, Raglan Mudstone and St Maughans formations and forms the lower part of the Old Red Sandstone. The rocks of this group have also previously been known as the Red Marl.
