= Sarn Complex =

Geological igneous rock group in Wales

The Sarn Complex is a group of closely related igneous rocks that intrude and cut through other rock lithologies in the Cymru terrane in Wales. The complex outcrops on the Llŷn Peninsula in a variety of places including Mynydd Cefnamlwch and the flanks of Pen y Gopa.

== Geological information ==
The largest plutonic body in the terrane has limited outcrop and is sheared by the Llyn Shear Zone in the west and covered by later (Arenig) sediments to the east. Altered to greenschist facies the pluton contains a bimodal suite of gabbro-diorite, monzogranite (Sarn granite) and granodiorite.

The Sarn granite is leucocratic and covers an expanse of about 6 km^{2} in contrast to the gabbro and diorite that exist as small and scattered exposures. The dioritic component of the complex has been confirmed as having a Neoproterozoic age of 614 ±2 Ma using U-Pb zircon dating. Therefore, the shearing of the Llyn is also temporally constrained by the date.
