= Valdar Jaanusson =

Estonian-Swedish geologist (1823–1899)

- Born: 1923; Nömme, Tallinn
- Died: August 28, 1999 (aged 75–76); Täby, Stockholm
- Citizenship: Sweden
- Education: Uppsala University
- Known for: Confacies; Jaanusson effect Ordovician geology Topostratigraphy
- Scientific career
- Fields: Stratigraphy
- Workplaces: Uppsala University; Geological Survey of Finland; Swedish Museum of Natural History

Valdar Jaanusson (1923 – August 28, 1999) was an Estonian-Swedish geologist. In 1960, he introduced the concept of topostratigraphy into Swedish stratigraphy. A recognized expert on the geology of the Ordovician period, he was member of the Estonian Academy of Sciences.
