= Skrinkle Sandstones Group =

Geological group in west Wales

- Stratigraphic range: Fammenian (Devonian) to Courceyan (Carboniferous)
- Type: Group
- Unit of: Old Red Sandstone Supergroup
- Sub-units: Gupton Formation, West Angle Formation
- Overlies: Ridgeway Conglomerate Formation (unconformity)
- Thickness: up to 300m

Lithology
- Primary: sandstones

Location
- Country: Wales
- Extent: Pembrokeshire

Type section
- Named for: Skrinkle Haven

The Skrinkle Sandstones Group is a late Devonian to early Carboniferous lithostratigraphic group (a sequence of rock strata) in west Wales. The name is derived from the bay of Skrinkle Haven in south Pembrokeshire. The Group comprises the Gupton and overlying West Angle formations and is up to 300m thick. It was deposited south of the east–west aligned Ritec Fault.
