= Chapel of St Non =

Church in Pembrokeshire, Wales

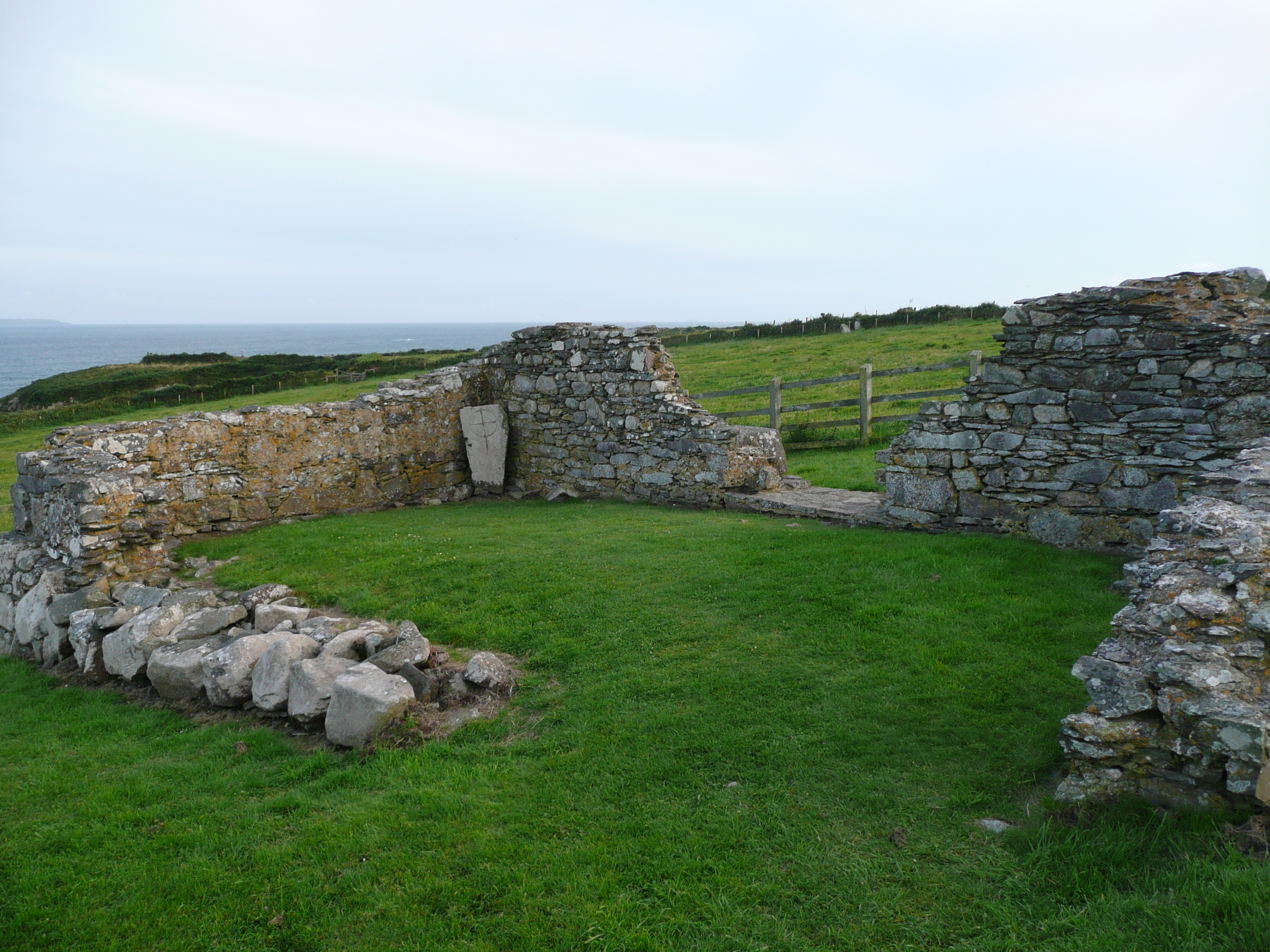
St Non's Chapel

The Chapel of St Non is located on the coast near St David's in Pembrokeshire, West Wales. Held by tradition to mark the birthplace of St David, the ruin cannot be accurately dated but is unusual in that it is aligned north–south rather than the usual east–west. Near to the ruined chapel is a retreat, a modern chapel and a holy well. The site was protected in the 1950s and is now the responsibility of the Welsh Heritage organisation Cadw.

== History ==
The ruined Chapel of St. Non is close to the Pembrokeshire Coast Path a few miles from the city of St David's. According to Christian tradition, Saint Non (also known as Nonna or Nonnita) was born around AD 475 and was a daughter of Lord Cynyr Ceinfarfog who lived as a nun at Ty Gwyn near Whitesands Bay until she was raped by Prince Sant of Ceredigion. She gave birth at Caerfai to a boy, who became the patron saint of Wales, St David.

The ruin is thought to be on the site of St Non's house and to be one of the oldest Christian buildings in Wales. In medieval times the chapel was one of the main sites visited by Christian pilgrims. Following the Protestant Reformation, pilgrimages stopped and the chapel was converted into a house before being used as a garden. The Grade II listed site was taken over by the Welsh Heritage organisation Cadw in the 1950s.

== St Non's Cross ==
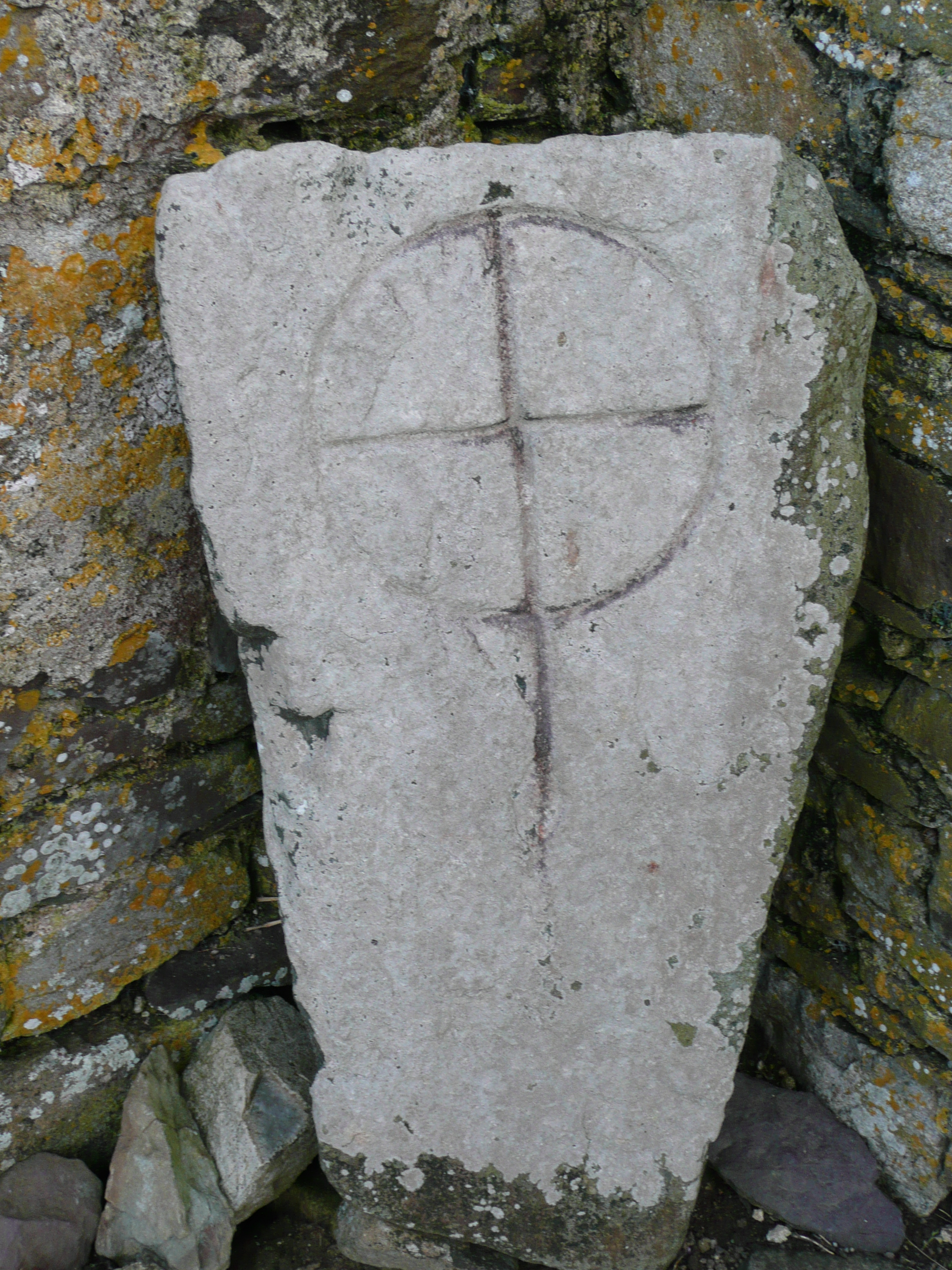
St Non's Cross

A large stone standing in the corner of the ruined chapel, inscribed with a cross within a circle, is known as St Non's Cross. The stone was found in the same field as the chapel and is either a grave or an altar stone. The stone is dateable to the 7th to 9th century, but there is no firm evidence that it originally came from the site.

== Standing stones ==
In the chapel field there are a number of standing stones which may be evidence of an Iron Age settlement. It is possible that the chapel was built within an original pagan circle of standing stones.

== Holy well ==
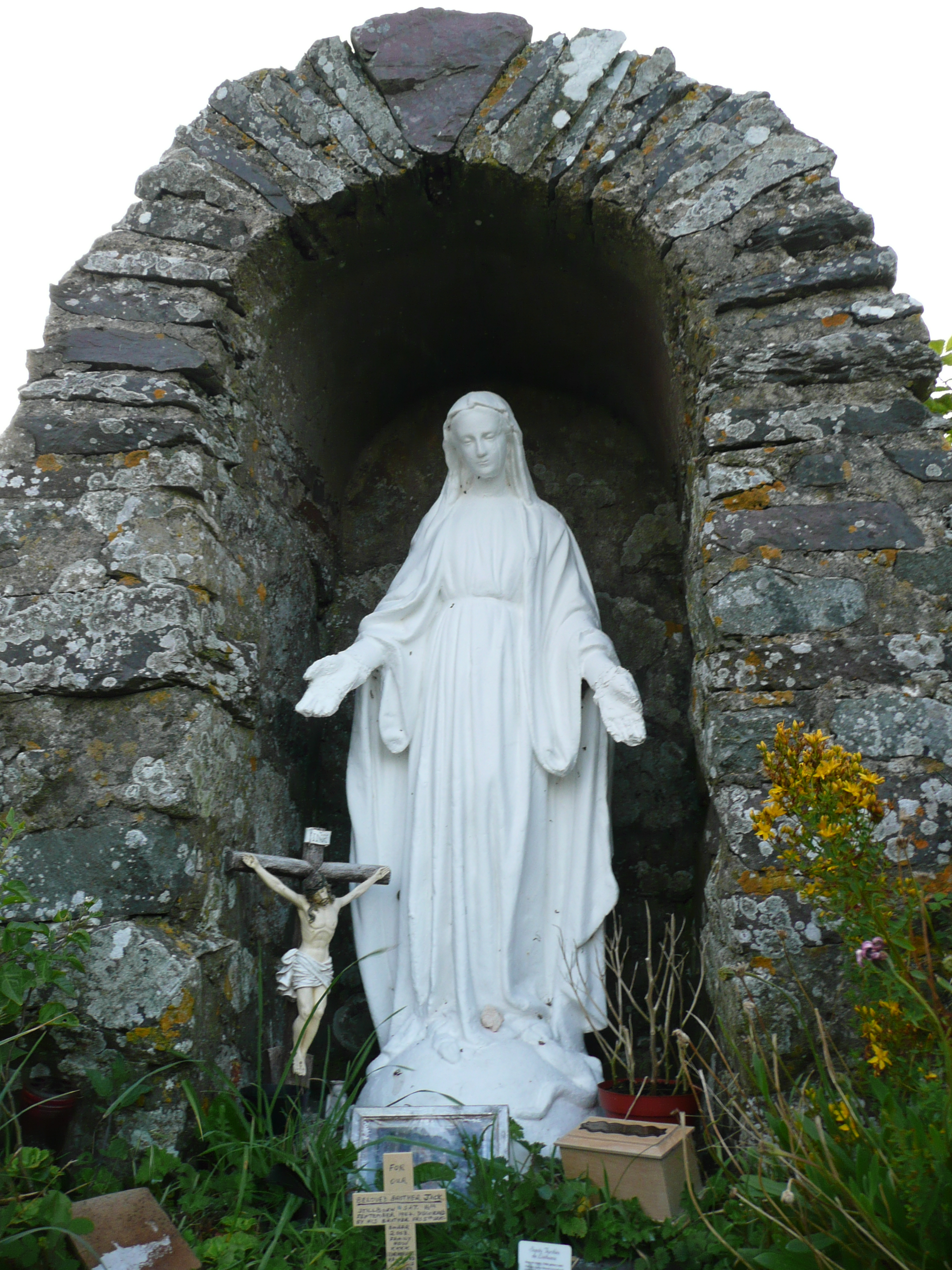
Shrine at St Non's Chapel

A holy well close to the chapel (51.872455°N 5.268365°W) was thought to have healing properties, and to this day visitors throw coins into the well for luck. Records of a survey of St. David's by Browne Willis in 1717 state that "there is a fine Well beside it [St. Non's Chapel], cover'd with a Stone-Roof, and enclos'd within a Wall, with Benches to sit upon round the Well. Some old simple People go still to visit this Saint at some particular Times, especially upon St. Nun's Day (March 2nd) which they kept holy, and offer Pins, Pebbles, Etc at this well", and reports from 1811 state that "the fame this consecrated spring has obtained is incredible and it is still resorted to for many complaints". It was thought to be particularly effective for eye problems and was restored in 1951 by the Catholic Church, which also erected a shrine using stones from nearby ruins. The vaulting over the well replaced ruins of medieval stonework in the 18th century. Water from the well was used by Pope Benedict during his visit to Britain.

== Modern chapel ==
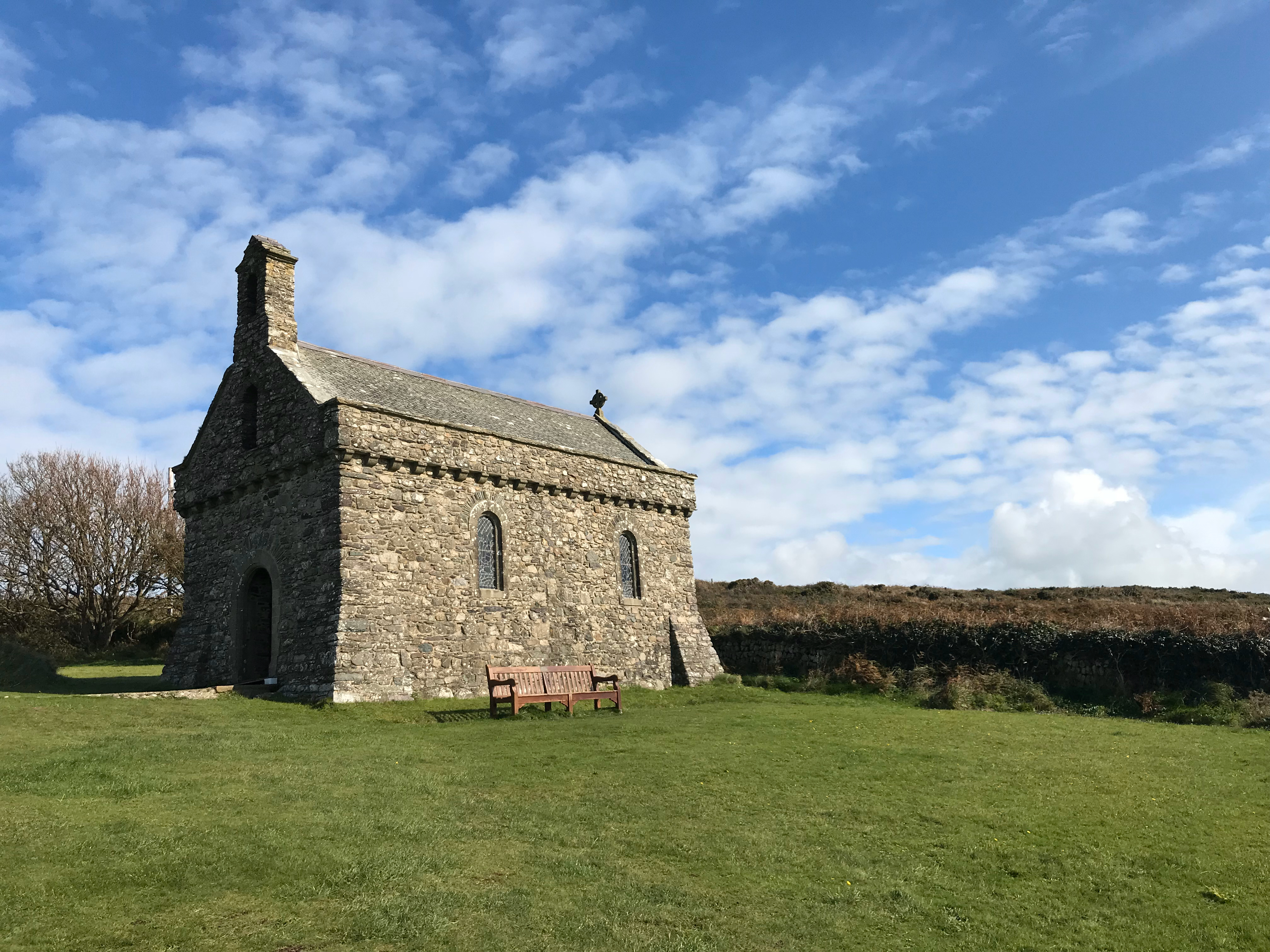
Chapel of Our Lady and St Non

A modern chapel (51.8723°N 5.2667°W) was built near the ruin in 1934 by Cecil Morgan-Griffiths, a solicitor from Carmarthen, using stone from ruined local chapels. He had built a house (now used as a retreat) overlooking the sea, and the nearest Catholic church was over sixteen miles away, so he decided to build one on the historic site. The new chapel is the most westerly in Wales and is also one of the smallest, as it is only 25 feet long by 12 feet wide. It has stained glass windows representing St Non, St David, St Bride, St Brynach and St Winifred. The stoup at the door is all that remains of the Chapel of the Fathoms, and the altar uses a white stone from the altar of St Patrick's Chapel. The window over the altar is in the school of William Morris. Cecil Morgan-Griffiths died the year after the new chapel was completed.

== Retreat ==
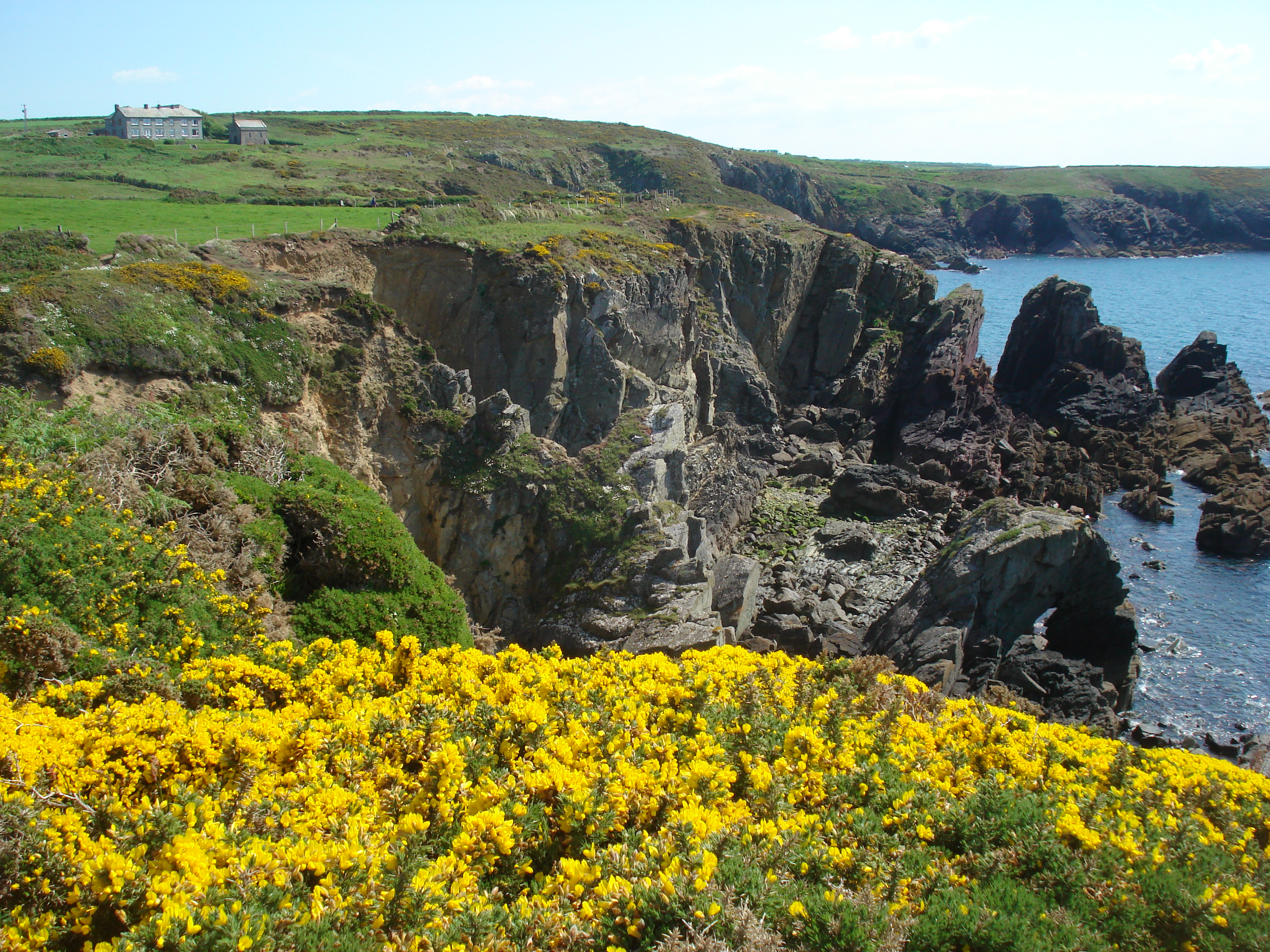
St Non's Retreat and the modern chapel overlooking St Non's Bay.

Behind the modern chapel is St Non's Retreat (51.8726°N 5.2670°W). It was owned by the Passionist Fathers (a religious institute founded by Saint Paul of the Cross) and run as a registered charity by the Sisters of Mercy. It offered a place of sanctuary and reflection, as well as workshops and sessions ranging from yoga to support for bereaved parents. It is owned by the Roman Catholic Archdiocese of Cardiff-Menevia and is run as a retreat. In early 2024 it underwent extensive refurbishment in preparation for its opening in April 2024.

== See also ==
- List of monastic houses in Wales
- St Davids Cathedral
- St Davids Bishops Palace
