= Papa Group =

- Stratigraphic range: Permian - Triassic
- Type: Group
- Underlies: Skerry Group
- Overlies: Zechstein Group

Location
- Country: Scotland

Type section
- Named by: Ritchie, J.D. et al

The Papa Group are a Triassic lithostratigraphic group (a sequence of rock strata) beneath the seas northwest of Britain, and which originated as alluvial deposits. It is the lateral equivalent of the combined Mercia Mudstone and Sherwood Sandstone Groups in the Irish Sea and onshore Britain. It contains the Otter Bank Formation and the Foula Formation.
