= Mull Lava Group =

- Stratigraphic range: Palaeocene epoch, Palaeogene
- Type: Group
- Sub-units: Mull Central Lava Formation, Mull Plateau Lava Formation, Staff Lava Formation
- Overlies: Moine Supergroup and Mesozoic sedimentary rocks
- Area: 840sq km
- Thickness: 1800 m (estimated)

Lithology
- Primary: basalt lavas

Location
- Country: Scotland
- Extent: Isle of Mull, Ardnamurchan, Morvern

Type section
- Named for: Isle of Mull

The Mull Lava Group is a Palaeogene lithostratigraphic group (a sequence of rock strata) in the west Highlands of Scotland. The name is derived from the Isle of Mull where they are most extensively seen, forming the bedrock across much of the island. They extend into the mainland peninsulas of Ardnamurchan and Morvern and also out to sea.

== Lithology and stratigraphy ==
The Group consists of around 1800 m thickness of lavas erupted from the Mull Central Volcanic Complex and display a range of chemistries. The Group includes (in descending order, i.e. oldest last):

- Mull Central Lava Formation
- Mull Plateau Lava Formation
  - Ben More Pale Member
  - Ben More Main Member
- Staffa Lava Formation
  - Ardtun Conglomerate Member
  - Gribun Mudstone Member (known as the Beinn Iadain Mudstone Formation in Morvern)

These three formations were formerly known as the Staffa, Main and Pale ‘suites’ of the Plateau Group
