= Signor–Lipps effect =

Sampling bias in the fossil record raising difficulties to characterize extinctions

The Signor–Lipps effect can make extinctions appear more extended in time than they actually are.

The Signor-Lipps effect is a paleontological principle proposed in 1982 by Philip W. Signor and Jere H. Lipps which states that, since the fossil record of organisms is never complete, neither the first nor the last organism in a given taxon will be recorded as a fossil. The Signor-Lipps effect is often applied specifically to cases of the youngest-known fossils of a taxon failing to represent the last appearance of an organism. The inverse, regarding the oldest-known fossils failing to represent the first appearance of a taxon, is alternatively called the Jaanusson effect after researcher Valdar Jaanusson, or the Sppil-Rongis effect (Signor–Lipps spelled backwards).

One famous example is the coelacanth, which was thought to have become extinct in the very late Cretaceous—until a live specimen was caught in 1938. The animals known as "Burgess Shale-type fauna" are best known from rocks of the Early and Middle Cambrian periods. Since 2006, though, a few fossils of similar animals have been found in rocks from the Ordovician, Silurian, and Early Devonian periods, up to 100 million years after the Burgess Shale. The particular way in which such animals have been fossilized may depend on types of ocean chemistry that were present for limited periods of time.

The Signor-Lipps effect creates several complications for paleontology research, namely issues with identifying the timing and speed of mass extinctions and uncertainty surrounding the ancestry of specific genera. For example, if the earliest-known fossil of genus X is much earlier than the earliest-known fossil of genus Y and genus Y has all the features of genus X plus a few of its own, it is natural to suppose that X is an ancestor of Y. But this hypothesis could be called into question at any time by the finding of a fossil of Y that is earlier than any known fossil of X—unless an even older fossil of genus X is found, and so on.

As a result of the Signor-Lipps effect, the last fossil occurrences only approximate the extinction rate. This approximation is better the more fossils per time unit are preserved.

The sporadic nature of the fossil record is reflected in huge gaps spanning a number of epochs.

== See also ==
- Lazarus taxon
- German tank problem
- Sampling bias
