= Claerwen Group =

Geological group in mid Wales

- Stratigraphic range: early Silurian
- Type: Group
- Sub-units: Rhayader Mudstones Formation, Derwenlas Formation
- Underlies: various formations
- Overlies: Cwmere Formation

Lithology
- Primary: mudstones
- Other: turbidites

Location
- Region: mid Wales
- Country: Wales

Type section
- Named for: Claerwen

The Claerwen Group is a Silurian lithostratigraphic group (a sequence of rock strata) in mid Wales. The name is derived from Claerwen in Powys where the strata are exposed. The Group comprises the Rhayader Mudstones Formation and the underlying Derwenlas Formation which outcrop across the region. The rocks of the Rhayader Mudstone Formation have variously been known as the Rhayader Pale Shales, Rhayader Pale Shales Formation and Cwmsymlog Formation.

== Outcrops ==
These rocks are exposed, though often poorly, in a belt of country which runs east from the Cardigan Bay coast northeast of Llangranog. A narrow outcrop also stretches northeast from Aberdyfi. A more extensive outcrop reaches south from Machynlleth to the Llanidloes and Rhayader areas and indeed through the eastern part of Claerwen Reservoir where the turbiditic mudstones of the Derwenlas Formation are exposed in the hillside beneath the dam. They are seen again in the vicinity of Llyn Brianne and in the core and margins of the Cothi and Doethie anticlines around Mynydd Mallaen.

== Lithology and stratigraphy ==
The Group represents anoxic facies of 125-500m thickness of mudstones with turbidites and hemipelagites with siltstones and thin sandstones laid down in the marine Welsh Basin during the Llandovery epoch of the Silurian period. The Derwenlas rocks are of Aeronian age whilst the Rhayader Mudstones are assigned to the Telychian.
