= Llanbedrog Volcanic Group =

- Stratigraphic range: Caradoc
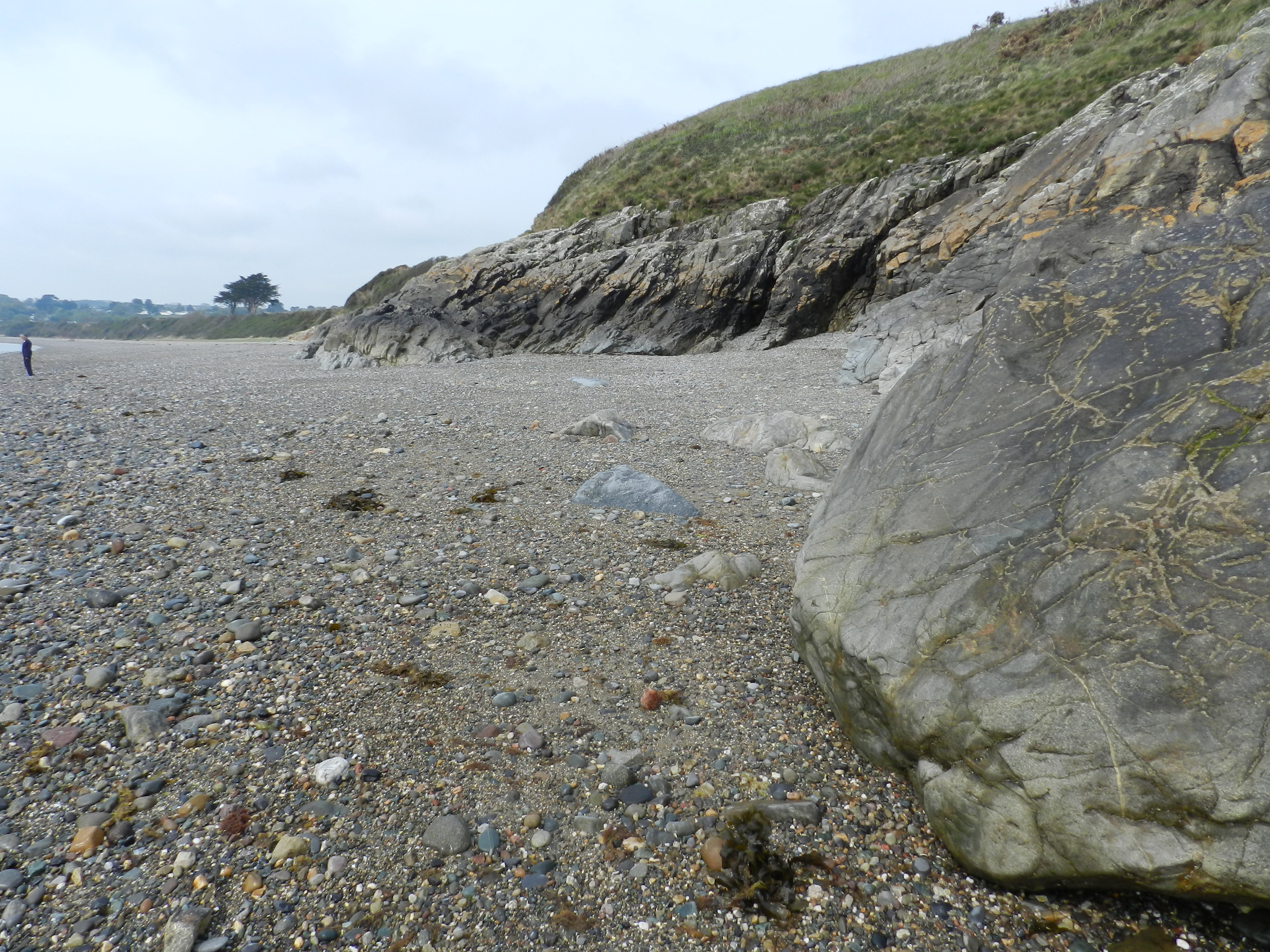
- Lavas of the Foel Ddu Rhyodacite Formation exposed at Carreg y Defaid, just east of Llanbedrog
- Type: Group
- Sub-units: Yoke House Formation, Carneddol Rhyolitic Tuff Formation, Foel Ddu Formation, Penmaen Formation
- Underlies: Nod Glas Formation
- Overlies: Dwyfach Formation

Lithology
- Primary: Tuff
- Other: Lava, volcaniclastic sediments

Location
- Region: northwest Wales
- Country: Wales

Type section
- Named for: Llanbedrog

The Llanbedrog Volcanic Group is an Ordovician lithostratigraphic group (a sequence of rock strata) in northwest Wales. The name is derived from the village of Llanbedrog on the Llŷn Peninsula where the strata are exposed.

== Outcrops ==
This succession of rocks is exposed around the village of Llanbedrog and in a band stretching northwestwards inland.

== Lithology and stratigraphy ==
The Group represents an assemblage of both volcanic rocks - lavas, tuffs, breccias - and volcaniclastic sediments - mudstones, siltstones, sandstones and conglomerates. It comprises (in descending order i.e. youngest first) the Yoke House Formation, the Carneddol Rhyolitic Tuff Formation, the Foel Ddu Formation and, at its base, the Penmaen Formation.
