= Henry Hicks (geologist) =

Welsh physician and geologist

Henry Hicks MRCS FRS FGS
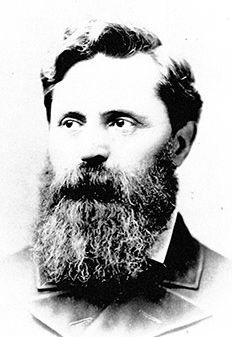
- Born: 26 May 1837; St Davids, Wales; UK of Great Britain and Ireland
- Died: 18 November 1899 (aged 62); Hendon, London, England; UK of Great Britain and Ireland
- Education: Dr of Medicine, St And (1862)
- Occupations: Physician; geologist
- Spouse: Mary Richardson (m. 1864)
- Children: 3 daughters
- Awards: Bigsby Medal (1883)

Henry Hicks (1837–1899) was a Welsh physician and geologist during the 19th century.

== Personal life ==
Henry Hicks was born on 26 May 1837 in the city of St Davids, Wales. His parents were Anne (née Griffiths) and surgeon Thomas Hicks. Hicks married Mary Richardson in February 1864, with whom he had three daughters. He died on 18 November 1899 in Hendon, London.

== Medical career ==
Hicks studied medicine at Guy's Hospital in London; in 1862, he became a member of the Royal College of Surgeons, and was licensed by Worshipful Society of Apothecaries. Hicks returned to St Davids to practise medicine, and in 1871, he moved his practise to Hendon, London. Focusing on mental health, Hicks received his Doctor of Medicine from the University of St Andrews in 1878, ultimately becoming the head of an asylum in Hendon Grove, solely treating women for mental disorders.

== Geology career ==
In St Davids, Hicks met palæontologist John William Salter, and became enamored with the burgeoning field of study. Hicks discovered a new Lingulella in the red, Cambrian-era rocks near his hometown, and wrote of it to the Geological Society of London. This earned him recognition and a grant from the British Science Association, leading him to find up to thirty more Cambrian species in 1868. Post-1868, Hicks included the higher Paleozoic-era strata in his searches. When he began his psychiatric work in Hendon Grove, this allowed Hicks much more time to devote to the geologic deposits in Middlesex.

Hicks coined the terms Pebidian and Dimetian to describe the Precambrian rocks around St Davids; both descriptors were still used by scientists as of the 2010s. Across the Geological Magazine, the Proceedings of the Geologists' Association, the Quarterly Journal of the Geological Society, and the Reports of the British Association, Hicks published 63 papers. He was also the first to discover fossils (of the Silurian) in the Morte Slates Formation.

Hicks was active in the British Science Association, Fellow and president of the Geologists' Association from 1883–1885, and made a Fellow of the Royal Society on 4 June 1885. He was awarded the Bigsby Medal from the Geological Society in 1883, became secretary from 1890–1893, 46th president from 1896–1898, and vice-president in 1899 at the time of his death.

=== Fossils described ===
- Agnostus cambrensis (renamed Peronopsis redita Pek & Vaněk, 1971.)
- Conocoryphe lyellii, (renamed Bailiella lyellii)
- Microdiscus sculptus
- Paradoxides harknessi (renamed Eccaparadoxides harknessi)
- Plutonia sedgwickii (renamed Plutonides sedgwickii)
- Theca antiqua

=== Publications ===
- Harkness, Robert; Hicks, Henry (10 May 1871). Dallas, William (ed.). "On the Ancient Rocks of the St. David's Promontory, South Wales, and their Fossil Contents". Quarterly Journal of the Geological Society of London. 27. London: Longmans, Green, Reader, and Dyer: 384–404. ISSN 0016-7649. LCCN 01024872.
- Hicks, H. (1881). "On the Discovery of some Remains of Plants at the Base of the Denbighshire Grits, near Corwen, North Wales". Quarterly Journal of the Geological Society. 37 (1–4). Geological Society of London: 482–495. doi:10.1144/GSL.JGS.1881.037.01-04.43. S2CID 128638113.
- Hicks, H. (1882). "Additional Notes on the Land Plants from the Pen-y-Glog Slate-quarry near Corwen, North Wales". Quarterly Journal of the Geological Society. 38 (1–4). Geological Society of London: 97–102. doi:10.1144/GSL.JGS.1882.038.01-04.09. S2CID 129820491.
- HICKS, H. Results of recent Researches in some Bone-caves in North Wales (Fynnon Bueno and Cae Gwyn), By Henry Hicks, M.D., F.R.S., F.G.S.; with a Note on the Animal Remains, by W. Davies, Esq., F.G.S. Quarterly Journal of the Geological Society for February 1886.
- Hicks, Henry (1895). Woodward, Henry (ed.). "On the Genus Plutonides (non Plutonia) from the Cambrian Rocks of St. David's". Geological Magazine. II (5). London: Dulau & Co.: 230–231. Bibcode:1895GeoM....2..230H. doi:10.1017/S0016756800121193. ISSN 0016-7568. S2CID 130849465.
