= Arbuthnott-Garvock Group =

Lithostratigraphic rock group in central Scotland

- Stratigraphic range: ?Lochkovian-Pragian, (Devonian)
- Type: Group
- Unit of: Old Red Sandstone Supergroup
- Sub-units: Catterline Conglomerate, Scone Sandstone, Craighall Conglomerate, Ruchil Flagstone and Craig of Monievreckie Conglomerate formations
- Underlies: Cromlix Mudstone Formation of Strathmore Group
- Overlies: Crawton Volcanic Formation and other units
- Thickness: 2400 - 3150m

Lithology
- Primary: sandstone
- Other: mudstone, siltstone, conglomerate

Location
- Region: Argyll, Fife, Angus, Aberdeenshire
- Country: Scotland
- Extent: along northern margin of Central Lowlands, south of Highland Boundary Fault from Kintyre to Aberdeenshire

Type section
- Named for: Arbuthnott and Hill of Garvock near Laurencekirk, both in Aberdeenshire

The Arbuthnott-Garvock Group (or Arbuthnot-Garvock Group) is a Devonian lithostratigraphic group (a sequence of rock strata) in central Scotland. The name is derived from the village of Arbuthnott in Aberdeenshire and the Hill of Garvock near Laurencekirk. The group comprises the previously separate overlying Garvock Group and the underlying Arbuthnott Group.

== Outcrops ==
These rocks are exposed in the west in southern Kintyre between Campbeltown and Southend and in an arcuate belt between Machrie and Sannox on the Isle of Arran. They occur in a southwest–northeast trending belt parallel to and just south of the Highland Boundary Fault between Helensburgh and Blairgowrie via Aberfoyle and Callander and as far as the southern edge of Stonehaven on the Scottish east coast. An extensive area in the east between Stonehaven and Dundee is underlain by these rocks including the Brechin, Forfar and Arbroath areas. A further belt of country between Forfar and Dunblane through Perth and extending into northern Fife is underlain by these rocks.

== Lithology and stratigraphy ==
The Group comprises numerous formations including the Catterline Conglomerate, Scone Sandstone, Craighall Conglomerate, Ruchil Flagstone and Craig of Monievreckie Conglomerate formations laid down during the Lochkovian to Pragian stages of the Devonian Period.
