= Riccarton Group =

Geologic group in Great Britain

- Stratigraphic range: Wenlock Silurian
- Type: Group
- Overlies: Carghidown Formation (faulted contact)
- Thickness: c500m

Lithology
- Primary: greywackes
- Other: mudstones, siltstones

Location
- Region: southern Scotland, northern England
- Country: United kingdom

Type section
- Named for: Riccarton

The Riccarton Group is a Silurian lithostratigraphic group (a sequence of rock strata) in southern Scotland and northern England. The name is derived from Riccarton in the Edinburgh area. The rocks of the Riccarton Group have also previously been known as the Riccarton Formation and the Riccarton and Raeberry Castle Beds. The Group comprises around 500m thickness of greywackes, mudstones and siltstones which are faulted and folded.
