= Halleflinta =

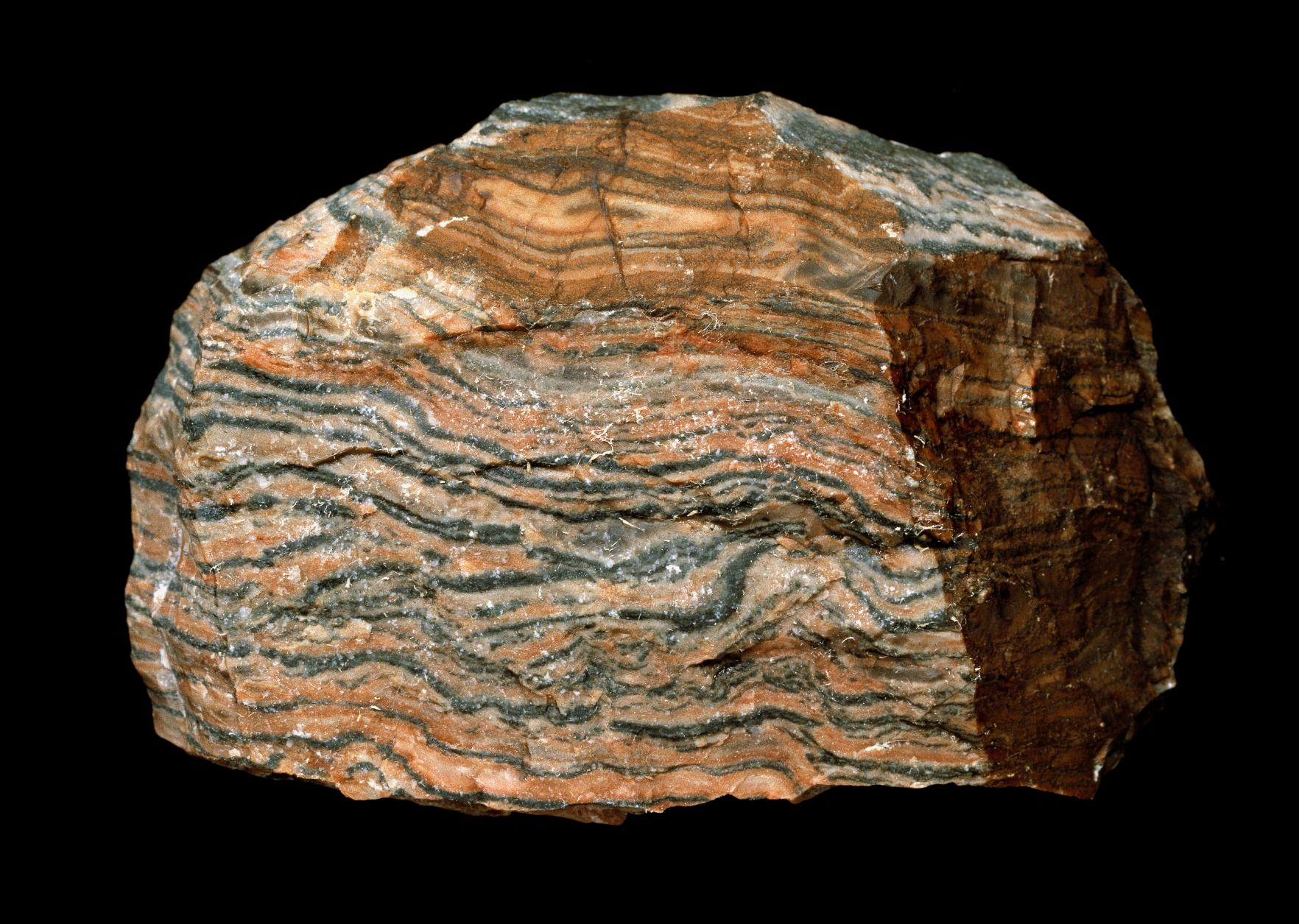
Hälleflinta

Hälleflinta (a Swedish word meaning rock-flint) is a white, grey, yellow, greenish or pink fine-grained rock consisting of an intimate mixture of quartz and feldspar.

Many examples are banded or striated; others contain porphyritic crystals of quartz which resemble those of the felsites and porphyries. Mica, iron oxides, apatite, zircon, epidote and hornblende may also be present in small amount. The more micaceous varieties form transitions to granulite and gneiss.

Hälleflinta under the microscope is very finely crystalline, or even cryptocrystalline, resembling the felsitic matrix of many acid rocks. It is essentially metamorphic and occurs with gneisses, schists and granulites, especially in the Scandinavian peninsula, where it is regarded as being very characteristic of certain horizons.

Of its original nature there is some doubt, but its chemical composition and the occasional presence of porphyritic crystals indicate that it has affinities to the fine-grained acid intrusive rocks. In this group there may also have been placed metamorphosed acid tuffs and a certain number of adinoles (shales, contact altered by intrusions of diabase). The assemblage is not a perfectly homogeneous one but includes both igneous and sedimentary rocks, but the former preponderate.

Rocks very similar to the typical Swedish hälleflintas occur in Tirol, in Galicia and eastern Bohemia.
