= Strathmore Group =

Geologic formation in Scotland

- Stratigraphic range: Emsian
- Type: Group
- Underlies: not seen
- Overlies: Arbuthnott-Garvock Group
- Thickness: 1800 - 2400m

Lithology
- Primary: sandstone, siltstone
- Other: mudstone, conglomerates

Location
- Region: Central Lowlands
- Country: Scotland

Type section
- Named for: Strathmore, Angus

The Strathmore Group is a Devonian lithostratigraphic group (a sequence of rock strata) in central Scotland. Its sandstones are interbedded with siltstones which interfinger with conglomerates. It is encountered from Arran in the west across the Midland Valley to Stonehaven in the east. The name is derived from Strathmore, Angus where this sequence occupies the axis of the Strathmore Syncline which runs for many tens of miles parallel to and south of the Highland Boundary Fault. The rocks of the Strathmore Group have also previously been referred to as the Strathmore Beds.
