= Arfon Group =

The Arfon Group is a stratigraphically defined geological group of rocks that are present in the Cymru terrane around Bangor in North Wales, United Kingdom. The group contains volcanogenic conglomeratic sandstone, fine-grained tuffite and tuffaceous sediment.

== Lithology and outcrop ==
This Precambrian volcano-sedimentary group incorporates over 4000 m of deposits and were previously considered to be of Cambrian age. Uranium–lead (U–Pb) isotope ratio data suggests that the whole succession is indeed Precambrian Neoproterozoic age. Exposure of the lower unit (Padarn Tuff) is exhibited on a ridge between Bangor and Caernarfon (both located in North Wales) and also on a ridge near Llyn Padarn. This is noted to be a thick sequence of acid ash flow tuffs and exhibits welding and are thought to be rapid deposition of thin air-fall tuffs and rhyolite flows placed in a bounded half-graben (or graben).

== Zircon (U–Pb) radioisotopic dating ==
Isotope data shows a zircon from the lower part of the succession as having a U–Pb isotope date of 614±2 Ma and 604.7±1.6 Ma and as such confirms a Neoproterozoic age.
