= Journal of the Geological Society =

- Discipline: Geology
- Language: English

Publication details
- Former names: Proceedings of the Geological Society of London. (1952–1971, ISSN 0375-0450); Quarterly Journal of the Geological Society of London. (1971 ISSN 0370-291X); Proceedings of the Geological Society of London. (1845, ISSN 0954-6308)
- History: 1826–present
- Publisher: Geological Society of London (United Kingdom)
- Frequency: Bimonthly

Standard abbreviations
- ISO 4: J. Geol. Soc.

Indexing
- CODEN: JGSLAS
- ISSN: 0016-7649

Links
- Journal homepage

The Journal of the Geological Society is a peer-reviewed scientific journal published by the Geological Society of London. It covers research in all aspects of the Earth sciences.
