= Welsh Basin =

Historical back-arc depositional basin

The Welsh Basin was a northeast-southwest aligned back-arc depositional basin during the Cambrian, Ordovician and Silurian periods during which a considerable thickness of marine sediments was laid down in the area. To the southeast lay the Midland Platform (a part of the micro-continent of Avalonia) and to the northwest, within the Iapetus Ocean, through what is now Ireland and the Lake District, was an island arc; a northeast-southwest aligned Irish Sea landmass which was associated with volcanic activity. Examination of the sediments and associated fossils allows the deeper centre of the basin to be distinguished from shallower 'platform' areas along its southeastern margins. From the middle Silurian onwards, collision of Avalonia with the more northerly continent of Laurentia occurred giving rise to the Caledonian Orogeny. The inversion of the basin occurred at that time i.e. its uplift and deformation.

The southeastern limit of the Welsh Basin can be defined as the Welsh Borderland Fault Zone comprising the Pontesford-Linley Fault and Church Stretton Fault which stretch from Pembrokeshire to Shropshire and, in the northwest, the Menai Strait Fault Zone. Its extent to the southwest and northeast is uncertain as these areas are cloaked by more recent rocks.

Siliciclastic material was derived from the landmass to its southeast Pretannia, some being deposited in the shallower margins before subsequently being redeposited as turbidites as the sediment mass became unstable from time to time. In addition to the sedimentary rocks of the Welsh Basin, there are a number of volcanic formations within the overall sequence, particularly within the Ordovician system.

Typical of the sediments of the Welsh Basin are the Llandovery age Aberystwyth Grits which outcrop along the middle coastal section of Cardigan Bay and comprise alternating mudstones and turbiditic sandstones.
