= Lithostratigraphy =

Sub-discipline of stratigraphy

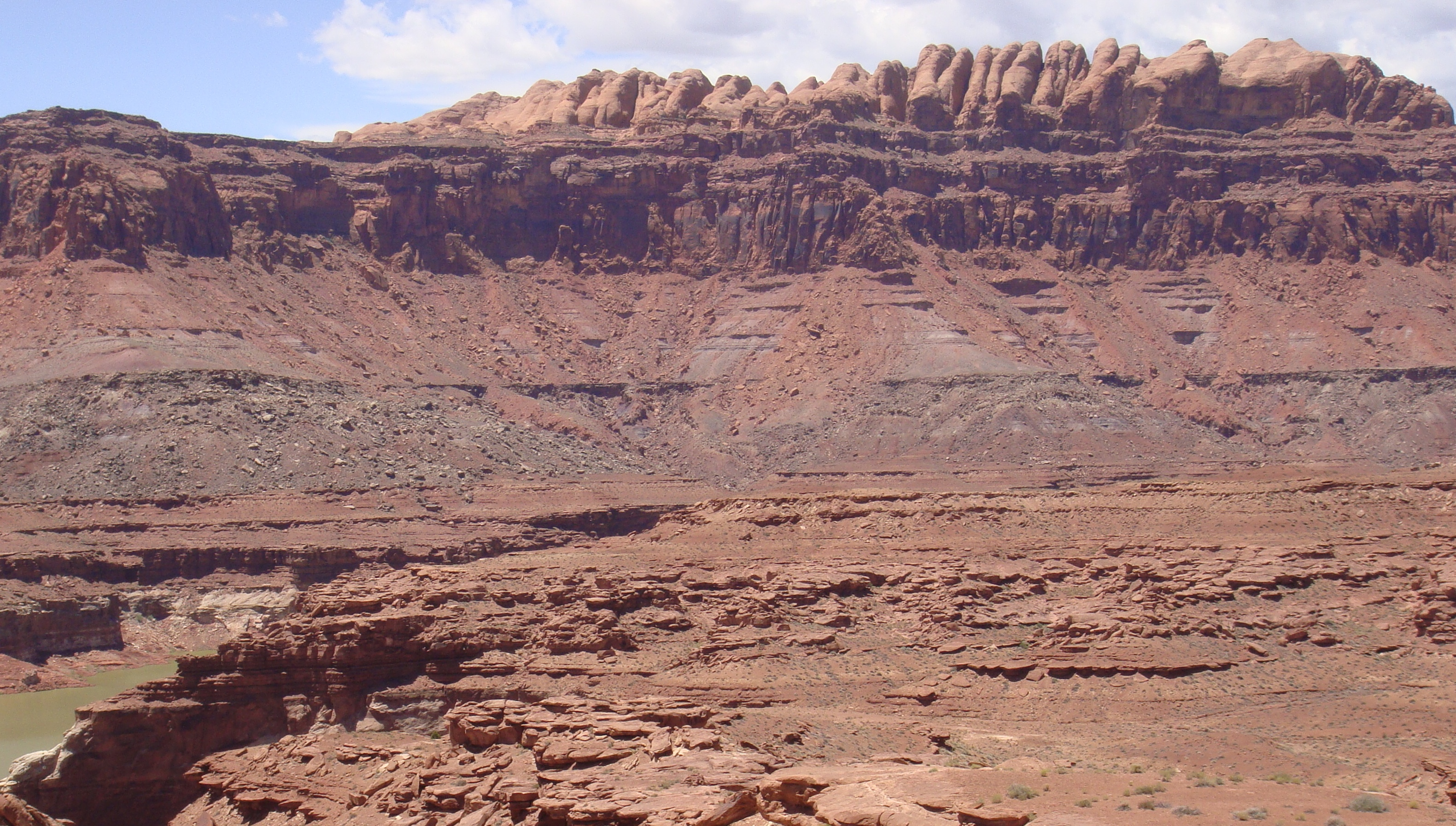
The Permian through Jurassic lithostratigraphy of the Colorado Plateau area of southeastern Utah that makes up much of the famous prominent rock formations in protected areas such as Capitol Reef National Park and Canyonlands National Park. From top to bottom: Rounded tan domes of the Navajo Sandstone, layered red Kayenta Formation, cliff-forming, vertically jointed, red Wingate Sandstone, slope-forming, purplish Chinle Formation, layered, lighter-red Moenkopi Formation, and white, layered Cutler Formation sandstone. Picture from Glen Canyon National Recreation Area, Utah.

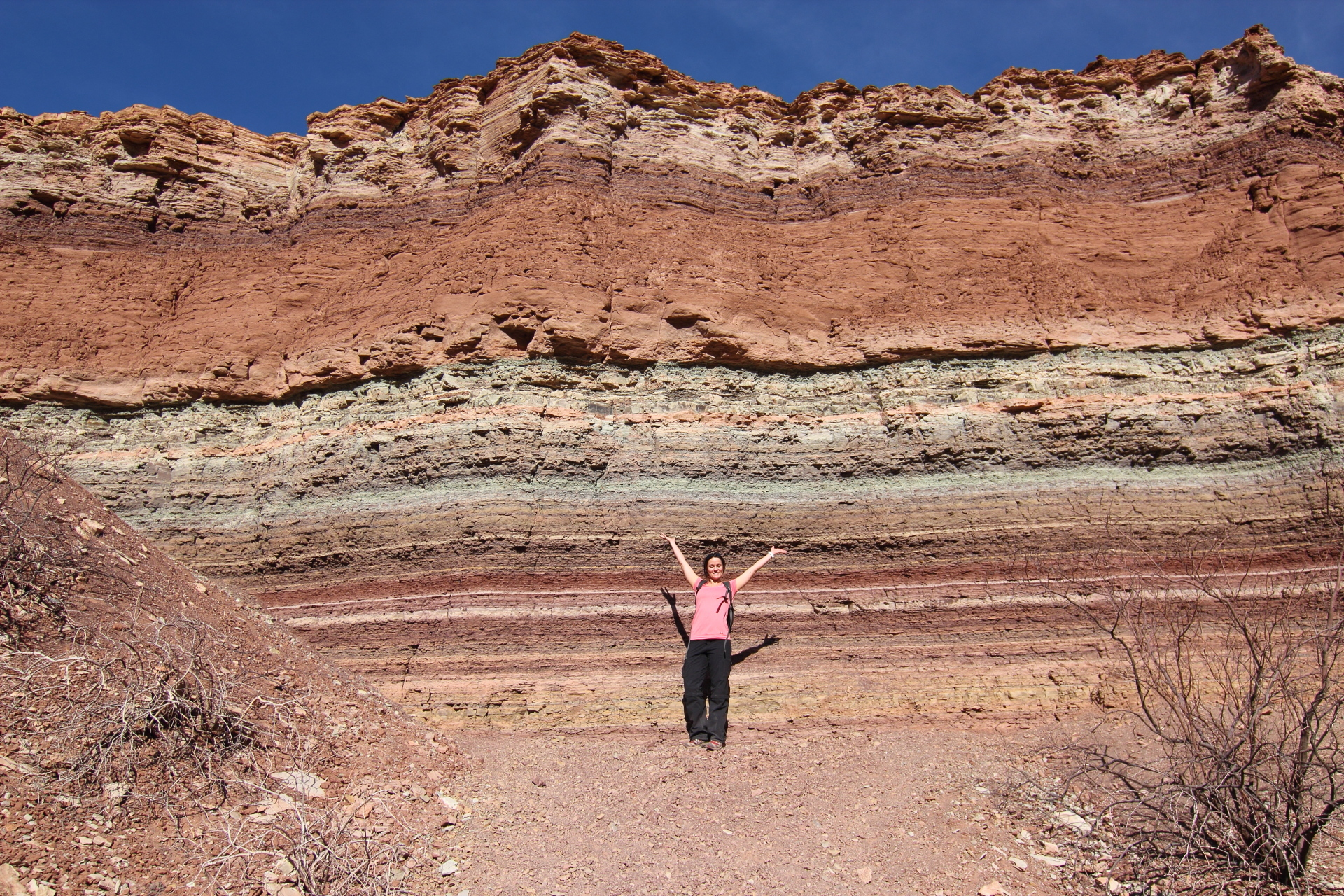
Strata in Salta, Argentina

Lithostratigraphy is a sub-discipline of stratigraphy, the geological science associated with the study of strata or rock layers. Major focuses include geochronology, comparative geology, and petrology.

In general, strata are primarily igneous or sedimentary relating to how the rock was formed. Sedimentary layers are laid down by deposition of sediment associated with weathering processes, decaying organic matter (biogenic) or through chemical precipitation. These layers are often distinguishable as having many fossils and are important for the study of biostratigraphy. Igneous layers occur as stacks of lava flows, layers of lava fragments (called tephra) both erupted onto the Earth's surface by volcanoes, and in layered intrusions formed deep underground. Igneous layers are generally devoid of fossils and represent magmatic or volcanic activity that occurred during the geologic history of an area.

There are a number of principles that are used to explain relationships between strata. When an igneous rock cuts across a formation of sedimentary rock, then we can say that the igneous intrusion is younger than the sedimentary rock. The principle of superposition states that a sedimentary rock layer in a tectonically undisturbed stratum is younger than the one beneath and older than the one above it. The principle of original horizontality states that the deposition of sediments occurs as essentially horizontal beds.

== Types of lithostratigraphic units ==
The principles of lithostratigraphy were first established by the Danish naturalist, Nicolas Steno, in his 1669 Dissertationis prodromus. A lithostratigraphic unit conforms to the law of superposition, which in its modern form states that in any succession of strata, not disturbed or overturned since deposition, younger rocks lies above older rocks. The principle of lateral continuity states that a set of bed extends and can be traceable over a large area.

Lithostratigraphic units are recognized and defined on the basis of observable physical rock characteristics. The lithology of a unit includes characteristics such as chemical and mineralogical composition, texture, color, primary depositional structures, fossils regarded as rock-forming particles, or other organic materials such as coal or kerogen. The taxonomy of fossils is not a valid lithological basis for defining a lithostratigraphic unit. The descriptions of strata based on physical appearance define facies.

The formal description of a lithostratigraphic unit includes a stratotype which is usually a type section. A type section is ideally a good exposure of the unit that shows its entire thickness. If the unit is nowhere entirely exposed, or if it shows considerably lateral variation, additional reference sections may be defined. Long-established lithostratigraphic units dating to before the modern codification of stratigraphy, or which lack tabular form (such as volcanic domes), may substitute a type locality for a type section as their stratotype. The geologist defining the unit is expected to describe the stratotype in sufficient detail that other geologists can unequivocally recognize the unit.

Lithosome: Masses of rock of essentially uniform character and having interchanging relationships with adjacent masses of different lithology. e.g.: shale lithosome, limestone lithosome.

The fundamental Lithostratigraphic unit is the formation. A formation is a lithologically distinctive stratigraphic unit that is large enough to be mappable and traceable. Formations may be subdivided into members and beds and aggregated with other formations into groups and supergroups.

== Stratigraphic relationship ==
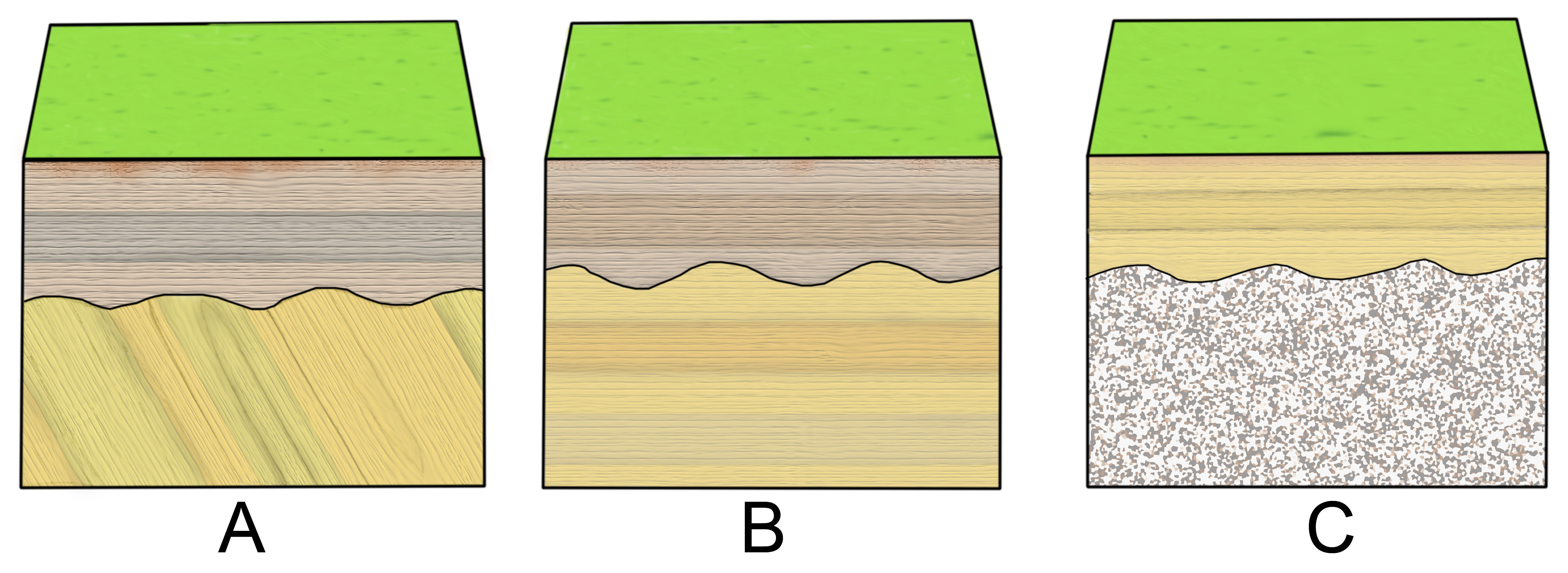
Diagrams showing stratigraphic relations: A: an angular unconformity; B: a disconformity; C: a nonconformity.

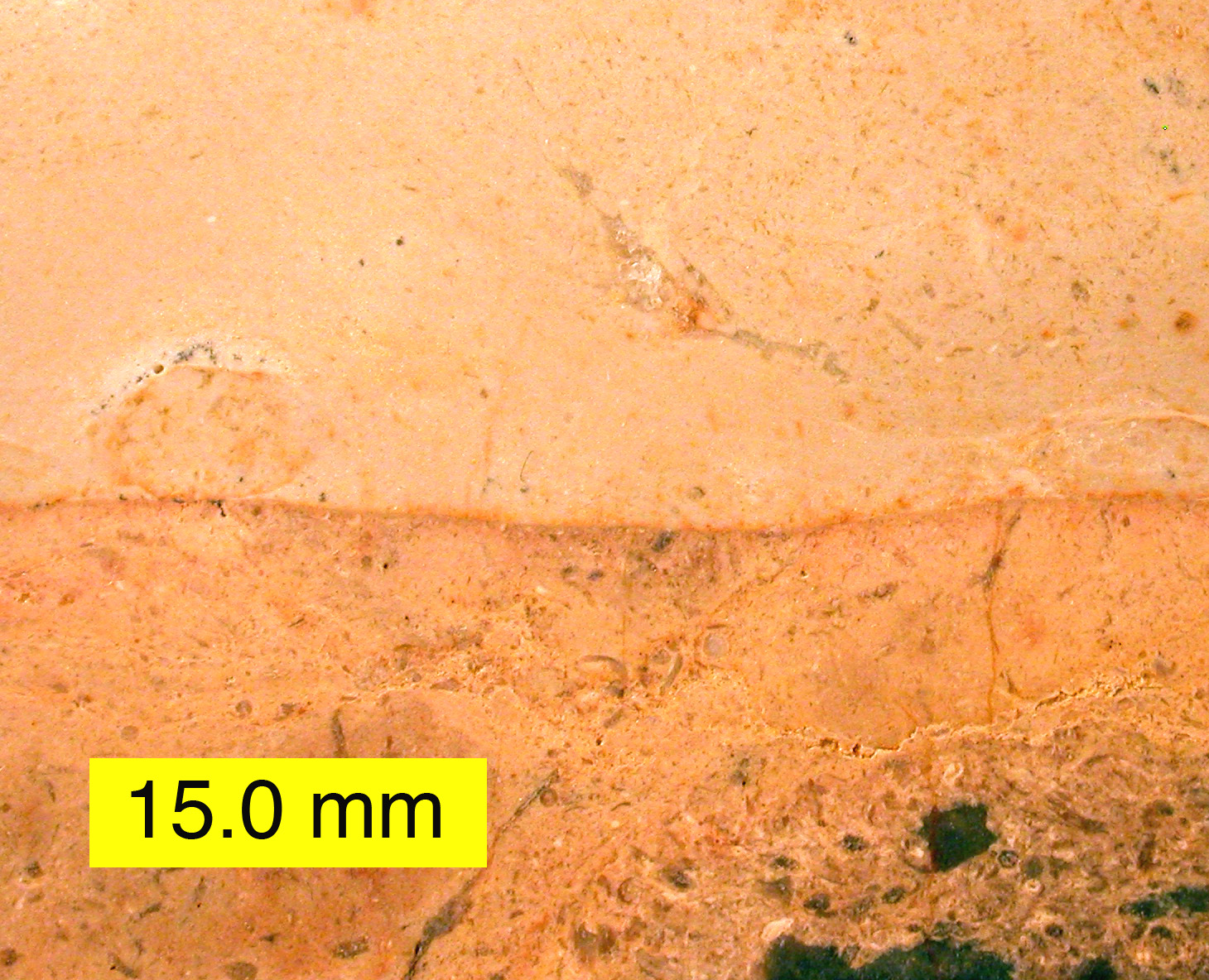
Disconformity with the Lower Cretaceous Edwards Formation overlying a Lower Permian limestone; hiatus is about 165 million years; Texas.

Two types of contact: conformable and unconformable.

Conformable: unbroken deposition, no break or hiatus (break or interruption in the continuity of the geological record). The surface strata resulting is called a conformity.

Two types of contact between conformable strata: abrupt contacts (directly separate beds of distinctly different lithology, minor depositional break, called diastems) and gradational contact (gradual change in deposition, mixing zone).

Unconformable: period of erosion/non-deposition. The surface stratum resulting is called an unconformity.

Four types of unconformity:

- Angular unconformity: younger sediment lies upon an eroded surface of tilted or folded older rocks. The older rock dips at a different angle from the younger.
- Disconformity: the contact between younger and older beds is marked by visible, irregular erosional surfaces. Paleosol might develop right above the disconformity surface because of the non-deposition setting.
- Paraconformity: the bedding planes below and above the unconformity are parallel. A time gap is present, as shown by a faunal break, but there is no erosion, just a period of non-deposition.
- Nonconformity: relatively young sediments are deposited right above older igneous or metamorphic rocks.

== Lithostratigraphic correlation ==
To correlate lithostratigraphic units, geologists define facies, and look for key beds or key sequences that can be used as a datum.

- Direct correlation: based on lithology, color, structure, thickness...
- Indirect correlation: electric log correlation (gamma-ray, density, resistivity...)

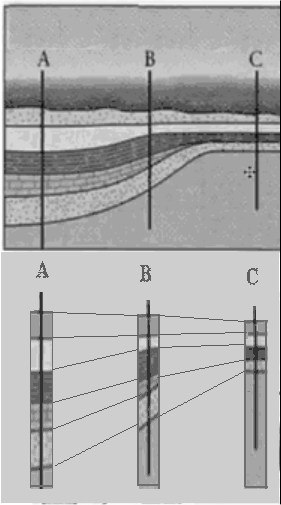
(A) Correlation scheme indicates which layers penetrated at different locations belong to the same body

Geological correlation is the main tool for reconstructing the geometry of layering in sedimentary basins. The lithological correlation is a procedure, decisive what layers (strata) in geological cross-sections located in different places belong to the same geological body now (or belonged in the past). The identification is based on comparison of physical and mineralogical characteristics of the rocks, and on general assumptions known as the Steno's principles: 1. The sedimentary strata occurred sequentially in time: the youngest at the top.
2. The strata are originally horizontal.
3. The stratum extends in all directions until it thins out or encounters a barrier.

The results are presented as a correlation scheme (A). Practical correlation has a lot of difficulties: fuzzy borders of the layers, variations in composition and structure of the rocks in the layer, unconformities in the sequence of layers, etc. This is why errors in correlation schemes are not seldom. When the distances between available cross-sections are decreasing (for example, by drilling new wells) the quality of correlation is improving, but meanwhile the wrong geological decisions could be made that increases the expenses of geological projects.

== Lithodemic stratigraphy ==
The law of superposition is inapplicable to intrusive, highly deformed, or metamorphic bodies of rock lacking discernible stratification. Such bodies of rock are described as lithodemic and are determined and delimited based on rock characteristics. The 1983 North American Stratigraphic Code adopted the formal terms lithodeme, which is comparable to a formation; a suite, which is analogous to a group, and a supersuite, similar to a supergroup. A lithodeme is the fundamental unit and should possess distinctive and consistent lithological features, comprising a single rock type or a mixture of two or more types that distinguishes the unit from those around it. As with formations, a lithodemic unit is given a geographical name combined with either a rock name or some term describing its form. The term suite is deprecated. Also formalized is the term complex, which applies to a body of rock of two or more genetic classes (sedimentary, metamorphic, or igneous). This establishes two hierarchies of lithodemic units:

Supersuite	Supercomplex
Suite	Complex
Lithodeme	(no equivalent)

Similar rules have been adopted in Sweden. However, the 1994 International Stratigraphic Guide regards plutons and non-layered metamorphic rocks of undetermined origin as special cases within lithostratigraphy.

== See also ==
- Biostratigraphy
- Chronostratigraphy
- Topostratigraphy
- Earth science
