= Buslingthorpe =

Buslingthorpe may refer to:

- Buslingthorpe, Lincolnshire, a hamlet in Lincolnshire
- Buslingthorpe, West Yorkshire, an area of Leeds
