= Buckfastleigh =

Town and civil parish in Devon, England

Coordinates: 50°28′53″N 3°46′44″W

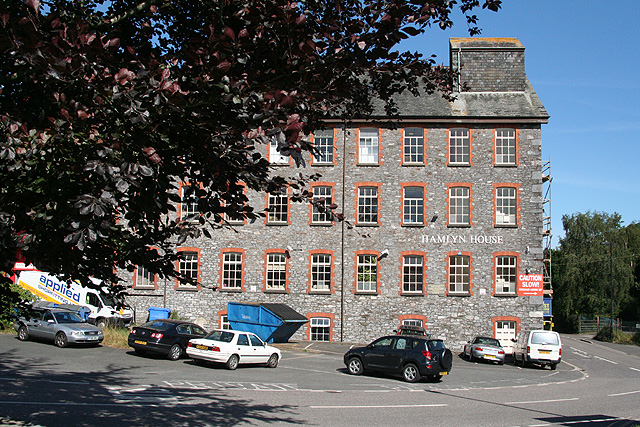
- Hamlyn House

- Location within Devon
- Population: 3,571 (2021 Census)
- OS grid reference: SX7366
- Civil parish: Buckfastleigh
- District: Teignbridge
- Shire county: Devon
- Region: South West
- Country: England
- Sovereign state: United Kingdom
- Post town: BUCKFASTLEIGH
- Postcode district: TQ11
- Dialling code: 01364
- Police: Devon and Cornwall
- Fire: Devon and Somerset
- Ambulance: South Western
- UK Parliament: Central Devon

Buckfastleigh is a market town and civil parish in the Teignbridge district, in Devon, England situated beside the Devon Expressway (A38) at the edge of the Dartmoor National Park. For ecclesiastical purposes, lies within the Totnes Deanery. It is 18 miles (29 km) east-northeast of Plymouth, 20 miles (32 km) southwest of Exeter and has a population of 3,571 at the 2021 census. It is a centre of tourism and is home to Buckfast Abbey, the South Devon Railway, the Buckfastleigh Butterfly Farm and Otter Sanctuary, the Tomb of Squire Richard Cabell and The Valiant Soldier Museum Heritage & Visitor Centre. With 13 letters, Buckfastleigh is one of the longest place names in England with no repeated letters, tied with Buslingthorpe, Leeds and Buslingthorpe, Lincolnshire, but exceeded by Bricklehampton in Worcestershire with 14 letters.

== Geography ==
Geographically, Buckfastleigh straddles the confluence of two small streams from Dartmoor which feed into the River Dart just to the east of the town. About one mile to the north lies Buckfast, home of Buckfast Abbey. To the northwest lie Holne and Scorriton on the southern breastwork of the Dartmoor upland. Pridhamsleigh Cavern is nearby and is neighboured by Ashburton and Lower Dean.

== History ==
Historically Buckfastleigh has grown as a mill town known for its woollen mills, corn and paper mills and a tannery supported by the rivers Dart, Mardle and the Dean Burn – water being an essential natural resource used in the manufacturing of wool and other products.

Buckfastleigh is medieval in origin, as is still evident in the original layout of the town. By the seventeenth century, most of the properties had been rebuilt, but the medieval layout, particularly in Fore Street, is still visible today.

The name "Buckfast" means "stronghold" – traditionally a place where deer and buck were held, and "Leigh" would have been the pasture belonging to Buckfast – hence the meaning deer held in a pasture (buck-fast-leigh).

Buckfast probably existed before Buckfastleigh as it is mentioned in the Domesday Book and in 1018 a Benedictine Abbey was founded and endorsed by King Canute at Buckfast.

Buckfastleigh town centre is now an area of mostly late eighteenth- to early twentieth-century buildings with a collection of private dwellings, commercial and retail properties and public houses which retain many, if not all, of their original features, styles and character.

The town centre during the first half of the twentieth century was a lively almost self-sufficient community with locally based employment and a large building programme of local authority housing initiated by Buckfastleigh Urban District Council which commenced in the 1920s and extended the town to the south west and the north west. Census data shows that in 1801 the population was 1,525, and 2,781 in 1901.

The Hamlyn family were the owners of the largest of the woollen mills in the town. In 1880 the Hamlyn family built Bossell - a large country house with 8 acres of land - as their family home in the town. The Hamlyn family monogram still adorns the front of the house. In 1887 they were instrumental in the building Buckfastleigh Town Hall to celebrate the Golden Jubilee of Queen Victoria.

Land was also made available at this time for further public facilities which included Victoria Park, the tennis courts and the swimming pool. The new primary school was built in 1875, while the railway line from Buckfastleigh and Ashburton to Totnes had been opened in 1872 (it lost its passenger trains in 1958; and the goods service in 1962). Links to Ashburton and Totnes are maintained by Country Bus service 88 and which continues to Newton Abbot. In addition bus service 38 (operated by Stagecoach South West provides links to Exeter, Ivybridge and from September 2025 Plymouth.

Pennywell Farm is an organic farm and tourist attraction just outside the town.

== Brook manor house and Sherlock Holmes ==
To the west of the town is the manor house of Brook, a grade II* listed building, built in 1656 by Richard Cabell (d. 1677), lord of the manor of Brook. He was the subject of a local legend which relates that on the night of his death, black hounds breathing fire and smoke raced over Dartmoor and surrounded Brook House, howling. Cabell's unusual tomb was allegedly designed to keep his restless spirit from roaming Dartmoor. Sir Arthur Conan Doyle based his Sherlock Holmes novel The Hound of the Baskervilles (1901–1902) on this legend. The story's description of Baskerville Hall, however, is based on Cromer Hall in Norfolk.

== South Devon Railway Trust ==
The South Devon Railway Trust is a charitable organisation that operates a heritage railway from Totnes to Buckfastleigh in Devon, alongside the River Dart. The heritage railway itself is known as the South Devon Railway, named in honour of the South Devon Railway Company that originally built much of Devon's railway infrastructure, although its previous name of the Dart Valley Railway is sometimes still heard.

The line was built by the Buckfastleigh, Totnes and South Devon Railway and first opened on 1 May 1872. Originally the line connected Totnes with Ashburton but in recent years the line passing between Buckfastleigh and Ashburton was demolished to make way for the A38 expressway. The line was worked by the larger South Devon Railway Company until 1 February 1876 when this was amalgamated into the Great Western Railway.

Vintage steam locomotives and carriages in the tradition of a bygone age are used; it offers unique scenery only seen from the railway. The South Devon Railway has a collection of both steam and diesel locomotives. There are many former Great Western engines and industrial locomotives, the South Devon Railway Trust work with National Railway Museum.

== Climate ==
Climate data for Buckfastleigh, 1981–2010 normals
Month	Jan	Feb	Mar	Apr	May	Jun	Jul	Aug	Sep	Oct	Nov	Dec	Year
Mean daily maximum °C (°F)	9 (48)	9 (48)	11 (52)	13 (55)	16 (61)	19 (66)	21 (70)	21 (70)	18 (64)	15 (59)	12 (54)	10 (50)	15 (58)
Mean daily minimum °C (°F)	4 (39)	4 (39)	5 (41)	6 (43)	8 (46)	11 (52)	13 (55)	13 (55)	11 (52)	9 (48)	6 (43)	5 (41)	8 (46)
Average precipitation mm (inches)	126.3 (4.97)	97.0 (3.82)	93.7 (3.69)	74.7 (2.94)	77.3 (3.04)	65.7 (2.59)	68.4 (2.69)	72.9 (2.87)	81.5 (3.21)	123.6 (4.87)	122.3 (4.81)	140.8 (5.54)	1,144.2 (45.04)
Source: Chelsa Climate

== Buckfast Abbey ==
Buckfast Abbey was founded by Earl Aylward in the reign of King Canute in 1018. In 1147 it became a Cistercian abbey and was rebuilt in stone. In medieval times, the abbey became rich through fishing and trading in sheep wool, although the Black Death killed two abbots and many monks – by 1377 there were only fourteen monks at Buckfast.

On 25 February 1539, William Petre arrived at Buckfast and declared the abbey to be dissolved by the order of King Henry VIII. The Dissolution of the Monasteries left monks compelled to leave and the buildings were looted and then destroyed. The abbey then stood in ruins for over two hundred years.

On 28 October 1882, six Benedictine monks arrived at Buckfast having been exiled from France. The land had been leased by monks from the St. Augustine's Priory in Ramsgate and it was later bought for £4,700. The first new abbot was Boniface Natter, who died in a shipwreck in 1906. His travelling companion Anscar Vonier became the next abbot and pledged to fulfil his dying wish, namely to rebuild the abbey.

== Buckfastleigh Rangers Football and Social Club ==
Buckfastleigh Rangers is a Football and Social Club based in Buckfastleigh, Devon. They were established in 1903, playing in the South Devon League. During recent years Rangers has enjoyed league promotion and cup success. The teams have won the Lidstone, Greenaway, Harry Treeby and the Devon Senior Cups. Over the years Buckfastleigh Rangers Football Club have played hosts to other league clubs including Torquay United, Plymouth Argyle, Watford F.C and Leyton Orient.

== Notable people ==
- William Hosking (1800–1861), writer, lecturer, and architect, in 1840 he became, the first Professor of Architecture at King's College London.
- John Prettyjohns (1823–1887), recipient of the Victoria Cross, a colour sergeant in the Royal Marines
- Albert Avery (c. 1883–1914), rugby union and professional rugby league footballer who played 289 games for Oldham R.L.F.C.
- Beryl Cox (1960) discovered the curly-coated Devon Rex cat locally in the 1960s.
- Guy Singh-Watson (born 1960), farmer, founding creator of Riverford, an organic farm and organic Vegetable box scheme
- Miracle Chance (born 1992), actress, singer and composer; works in musical theatre.
- Bryony Frost (born 1995), a National Hunt jockey, the first female jockey to win a Grade 1 race at the Cheltenham Festival

== Caves ==
Caves in Buckfastleigh include:

- Bakers Pit
- Joint Mitnor Cave (containing unfossilised remains of bison, hippopotamus, hyaena, elephant and others)
- Reed's Cave
