= Organic Herb Trading Co. =

Supplier of organic herbs and spices

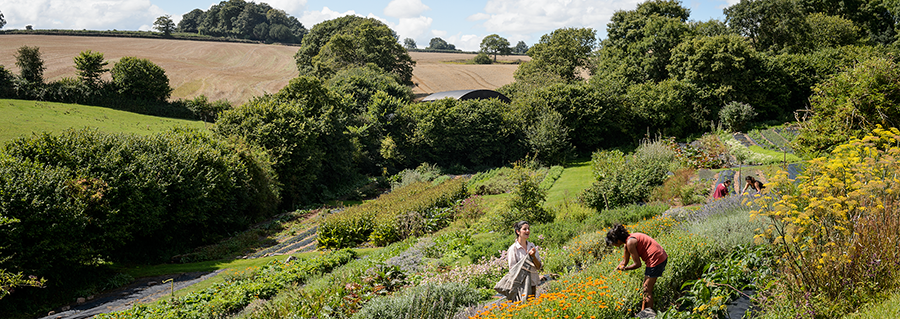
The Organic Herb Trading Company's certified biodynamic and organic herb field in Milverton, Somerset

The Organic Herb Trading Company is a supplier of organic herbs and spices. It was founded by Mike Brook in 1982 in a small village called Hambleden near Henley-on-Thames. Over the last 30 years, the company has grown and sourced the UK's largest range of ingredients for a diverse range of customers in the herbal tea, food, health, and beauty markets. Their customers are based both in the UK and worldwide and include brands such as Pukka Herbs, Neal's Yard Remedies, and River ford.

== History ==
Founder Mike Brook began to grow his own herbs on an acre of land in Hambleden. He soon noticed that there was a gap in the market for high quality herbal ingredients. This, combined with his interest in the growing organic movement, sparked his decision to establish a business to supply herbs and spices to medicinal herbalists and the wider organic sector. An early customer was Neal's Yard Remedies, which opened in 1981, and this partnership remains today. In 1994, both Mike and the business moved from Hambleden to Milverton in Somerset. With the new, larger location, the company was able to expand, and added a range of drying, cutting, milling and blending machinery to the site, to meet the specific needs of customers. The branded arm of the business, known as Hambleden Herbs, was established to sell teas, herbs and spices to the retail sector, but was then sold in 2004.

Today, the Organic Herb Trading Company sources products from over 60 countries and has over 500 products in its range.

== Products ==
The Organic Herb Trading Company typically holds in stock over 725 herbs, spices, superfoods and botanicals - both sourced internationally and grown on site in Milverton.

== Superfoods ==
Products considered so-called "superfoods" contain high levels of antioxidants, vitamins, or other nutrients. The Organic Herb Trading Company has been responsible for many significant superfood sourcing firsts, including pioneering the sale of organic Baobab powder into the UK market.

== Herb field ==
The Organic Herb Trading Company grows over 60 varieties of medicinal and culinary herbs on their Demeter-certified biodynamic herb field in Somerset, which is managed year-round by experienced grower Sarah Weston, thanks to volunteers during the summer months.

== Certifications ==
In 2014, Organic Herb Trading Company became the UK first processor and distributor of FairWild certified herbs and spices.

The organisation also holds certifications from the Soil Association, Fair for Life, Fairtrade, and Demeter.
