= Tambourelli =

Court game

- First played: 1970 in Scotland

Characteristics
- Contact: none
- Team members: 1 and 2 players
- Mixed-sex: separate competitions and mixed doubles
- Type: court game
- Equipment: tambourines, shuttlecock and net
- Venue: outdoor and indoor

Presence
- Country or region: Europe, Asia, America

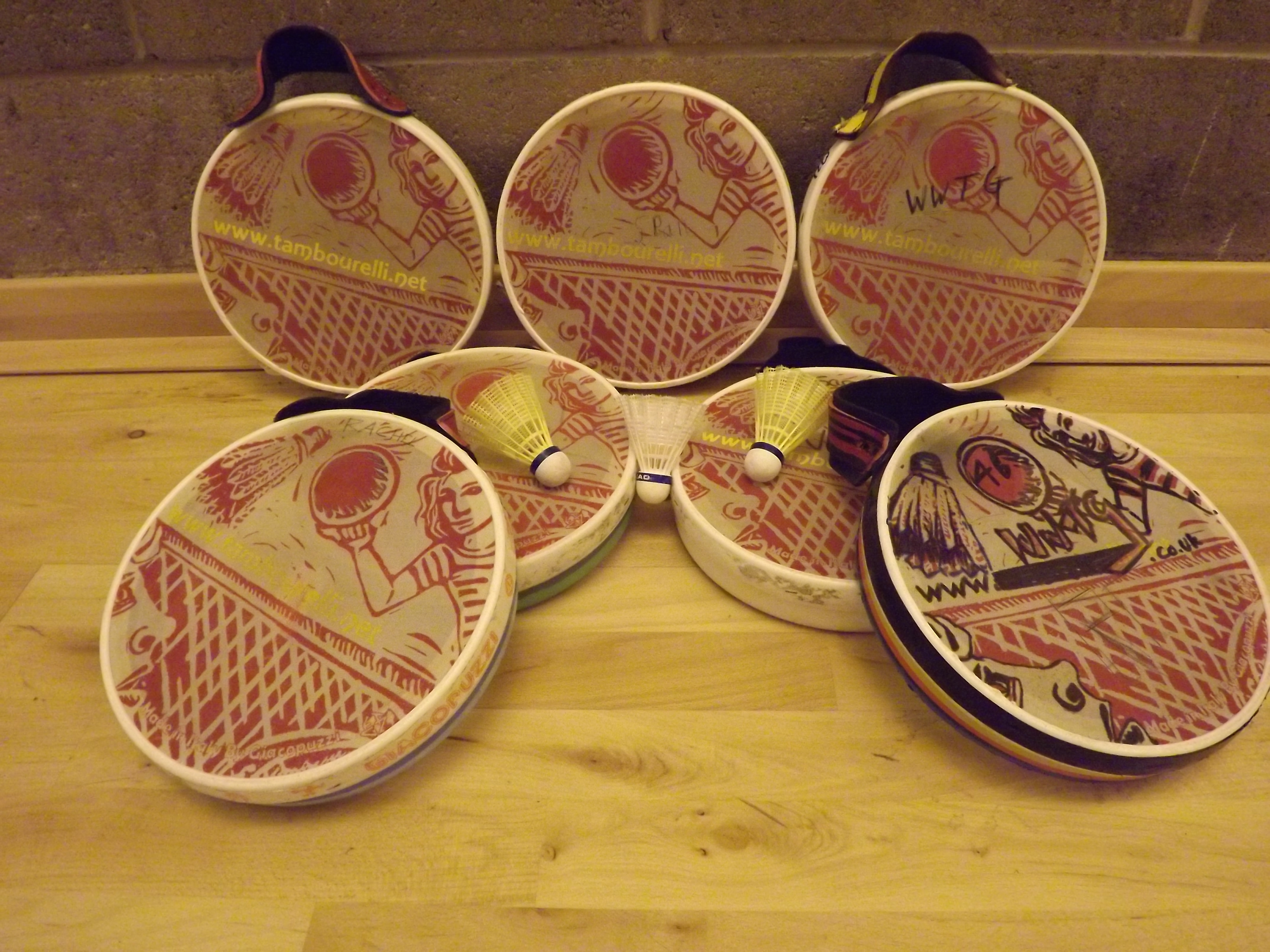
7 Tambourelli bats from c.2012.

Tambourelli is a court game invented in Galloway in Scotland in the 1970s. It has since spread all over the world, with small communities of players running active clubs in England, Scotland, Germany, Japan and Sweden. It shares many players, coaches and fans with Tamburello as well as Tambeach.

The fundamental aim is for players to stop the shuttlecock from landing within the court on their side of the net. Players hit the shuttlecock with a bat similar to a tambour (like a tambourine without bells) or Irish bodhrán which has a strap along the outer edge and a section of moulded plastic on the inner edge, both for grip.

The game can be played either outdoors or indoors.

There is an annual World Tambourelli Championship, as well as numerous Open Tournaments throughout the year such as in Dresden every September or Hamburg every January.

== Rules ==
The aim of the game is to have the shuttlecock land within the court on your opponent's side of the net, or to force them to make an error such as hitting the shuttlecock into the net or outside of the court.

Tournament matches are typically played in sets of three games. Each game is played until one player reaches 21 points and is 2 points clear, a point being scored for each shot that one's opponent fails to legally return, regardless of who served. Each player serves 5 times before switching, with the first player to serve being decided by playing a point before scoring begins.

Service is underarm (beneath the shoulder) and must be taken with one foot on the court's back line. If the first service is called "out" or fails to cross the net, a second service is awarded. In singles, a player may serve to anywhere on their opponent's side of the court. In doubles, service is to the player diagonally opposite and must fall within their half of the court. A "net service" (one which clips the net on the way over but still lands "in" or which the receiving player returns) is replayed without penalty.

When a player has served for 5 points, service changes to the opposing player or team. In doubles, service passes diagonally until all players have served for 5 scored points, at which point service resumes with the first player who served and the two opposing team members swap places, so that each server now serves to a new recipient.

If the shuttlecock hits any part of the player's body, that player loses the point. Players are only allowed to hit the shuttlecock once to get it onto the opponent's side. The exception to this is the "Point Save" rule, which applies only in Doubles games. This rule allows a team to hit the shuttlecock twice to return it; however if that team goes on to win the rally they do not gain a point (they merely "save" or rescue the point). Should the opposing team also double-hit in the same rally, the two "point saves" cancel each other out and whichever team prevails in the rally wins the point. Should one team double-hit a second time in the rally when they are already one "point save" down, they lose the point (i.e. they do not "save" it).

Different clubs use slightly different court sizes, with the hosts of any given tournament permitted to choose the court size for that event, but the standard court is 9.45m long by 4.2m wide (singles) and 4.65m wide for doubles. It is split in half lengthways by a line and widthways by a net, at a height of 1.75m, with each player (in singles) or team (in doubles) always remaining on their side of the net.

== World Tambourelli Championships ==
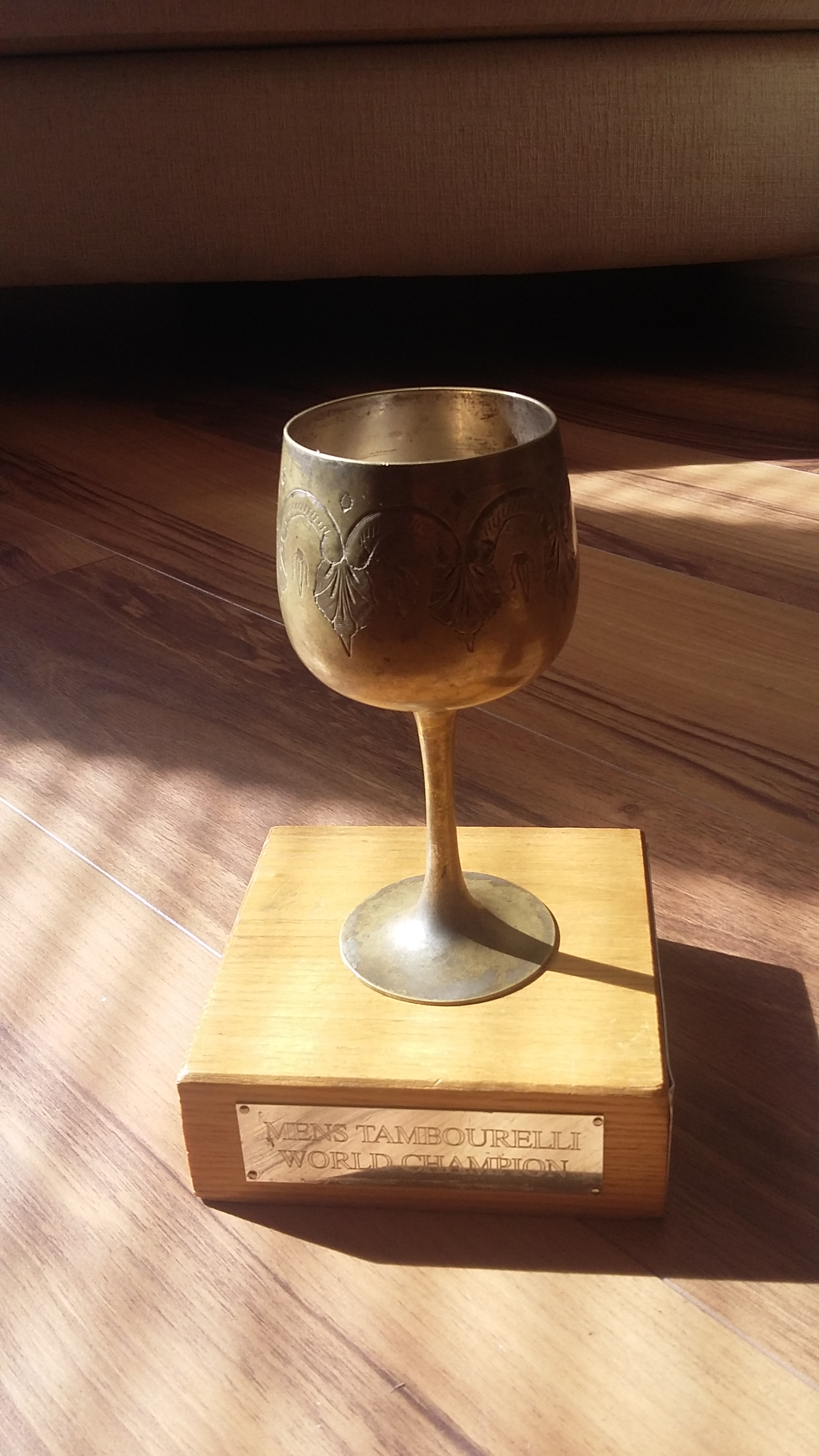
Men's Tambourelli World Champion trophy and plinth

There is an annual World Tambourelli Championship, which originally took place exclusively in Dumfries and Galloway in Southwest Scotland. During the 1990s tournaments were relocated to Southwest England, near Totnes in Devon. Recently, the tournament moves between Sweden, Germany, and England. The event currently includes a Men's Singles tournament, a Women's Singles tournament, a Mixed Doubles tournament, and Junior Singles and Doubles tournaments.

Since 2002 separate Men's Singles and Women's Singles competitions have been held. From 1991 to 2001 only an 'open' category was held that anybody could enter. For the purposes of historical record, the champions of the 1991-2001 era are referred to here as Men's Singles champions, as no woman ever won the open category (although Indy Priestman came close, reaching the final in 2001). Before 1991 there was generally also separate Men's and Women's Singles though the main emphasis in the tournaments was on the Mixed Doubles competition.

The format of the tournament can vary depending on the number of participants and the availability of time and space, as well as the preferences of the hosts. Usually there is a round-robin group stage in which a single game to 21 is played, followed by a knockout stage of 4, 8 or 16 participants where each match is best-of-3.

The groups are usually decided upon by randomly allocating 1 of the highest ranked participants to each group, then randomly assigning the remainder of the participants among the groups evenly. However the seeding system has only existed since 2011, and the method by which rankings are calculated is still the source of much debate.

In the Mixed Doubles category pairings have traditionally been decided by drawing names out of a hat. Where seeded players are drawn together those names are placed back in and redrawn, the aim being to allow for no team to be excessively dominant and for the random pairing of experienced and inexperienced players or those of differing ability in the same competition. At some tournaments Doubles pairs are pre-chosen. This is generally the case in Germany where separate Men's Doubles, Women's Doubles and a Mixed Doubles competitions have been held.

Typically there are children's tournaments that take place at the same place and time. However, these vary from year to year in several ways: sometimes (usually in Devon) there is simply an under-14s singles and doubles tournament, sometimes there are multiple age groups and separate boys/girls tournaments, and sometimes the Under 16s World Tambourelli Championships take place at a different date and entirely different venue to the World Tambourelli Championship, such as in 2008 when the main WTC took place on Riverford Farm in Devon but the Under 16s tournament took place in Newton Stewart in Scotland.

== Results ==
=== Men's singles world champions by year ===
Year	Winner	Runner-up	Venue
2026	(Germany) Alexander Christen	(Germany) Sebastian Rose	Neustadt in Sachsen
2025	(Germany) Alexander Christen	(Germany) Sebastian Rose	Eslöv
2024	(Germany) Alexander Christen	(Denmark) Isak Lindstedt	London
2023	(Germany) Alexander Christen	(Germany) Dominic Hauke	Kleinnaundorf
2022	(Germany) Alexander Christen	(Denmark) Isak Lindstedt	Stehag
2021	No tournament held	No tournament held	N/A
2020	No tournament held	No tournament held	N/A
2019	(Germany) Alexander Christen	(England) Rowan Appleton-Wickens	Stehag
2018	(Germany) Sebastian Rose	(Scotland) Bazil Hughes	Merrick Leisure Centre, Newton Stewart
2017	(Scotland) Bazil Hughes	(Germany) Marco Zink	Riverford Farm, Devon
2016	(Germany) Marco Zink	(Scotland) Bazil Hughes	Dresden
2015	(Germany) Sebastian Rose	(Germany) Marco Zink	Merrick Leisure Centre, Newton Stewart
2014	(Scotland) Bazil Hughes	(Sweden) Finn Lennartsson	Riverford Farm, Devon
2013	(Scotland) Bazil Hughes	(Scotland) Malcolm Heyes	Dresden
2012	(Scotland) Malcolm Heyes	(Scotland) Seth Priestman	Riverford Farm, Devon
2011	(Scotland) Bazil Hughes	(Scotland) Malcolm Heyes	Riverford Farm, Devon
2010	(Scotland) Liam Campbell	(England) Ezra Cohen	Merrick Leisure Centre, Newton Stewart
2009	(England) Daniel Francis-Bernson	(England) Ezra Cohen	Riverford Farm, Devon
2008	(England) Ezra Cohen	(Ghana) Peter MacCarthy	Riverford Farm, Devon
2007	(England) Daniel Francis-Bernson	(England) Ezra Cohen	Riverford Farm, Devon
2006	(Scotland) Malcolm Heyes	(England) Paddy Bos Coe	Riverford Farm, Devon
2005	(Scotland) Malcolm Heyes	(England) Ezra Cohen	Riverford Farm, Devon
2004	(England) Richard Cohen	(Scotland) Malcolm Heyes	Riverford Farm, Devon
2003	(Scotland) Malcolm Heyes	(England) Ezra Cohen	Riverford Farm, Devon
2002	(Scotland) Malcolm Heyes		Riverford Farm, Devon
2001	(England) Richard Cohen	(Scotland) Indy Priestman	Riverford Farm, Devon
2000	(Scotland) Malcolm Heyes	(Ghana) Peter MacCarthy	Riverford Farm, Devon
1999	(England) Paddy Bos Coe	(Scotland) Malcolm Heyes	Riverford Farm, Devon
1998	(England) Paddy Bos Coe	(Scotland) Seth Priestman	chez Finn & Ella, Garlieston
1997	(England) Paddy Bos Coe	(England) Luke Feldman	Minniwick, Galloway
1996	(Scotland) Seth Priestman	(England) Cyrus Colquhitt	chez Rex Pyke, Garlieston
1995	(Scotland) Davey Mackenzie	(Scotland) Seth Priestman	Knowe Farm, Galloway
1994	(Scotland) Malcolm Heyes	(Scotland) Andy Priestman	Corriedoo, Galloway
1993	(England) Guy Feldman	(Scotland) Andy Priestman	chez Rex Pyke, Garlieston
1992	(Scotland) Andy Priestman		
1991	(Scotland) Andy Priestman		Mochrum Park, Galloway
1990	(Scotland) Mike Sullivan	(Scotland) Andy Priestman	Loch Grannoch, Galloway
1989	(England) Brendan Colvert	(Fiji) Brishendra Dutt	Euchanbank, Galloway
1988	(England) Francis O'Dempsey	(Scotland) Andy Priestman	Mochrum Park, Galloway
1987			Castle Stewart, Galloway
1986	No Men's Singles Played	No Men's Singles Played	Balmaclellan, Galloway
1985	No Men's Singles Played	No Men's Singles Played	Minniwick, Galloway
1984	(Scotland) Andy Priestman	(England) Kim Middleton	Castle Stewart, Galloway
1983			
1982	(Scotland) Davey Mackenzie	(Scotland) Andy Priestman	Corriedoo, Galloway
1981			
1980			
1979			
1978			

=== Women's singles world champions by year ===
Year	Winner	Runner-up	Venue
2026	(Germany) Silke Bruns	(Germany) Trixi Reuther	Neustadt in Sachsen
2025	(Denmark) Anja Lund	(Germany) Nadine Wolf	Eslöv
2024	(Germany) Lisa Zink	(Germany) Silke Bruns	London
2023	(Sweden) Indy Lennartson* (Denmark) Anja Lund* (Germany) Patricia Poch*	Not decided	Kleinnaundorf
2022	(Denmark) Anja Lund	(Germany) Carmen Ketelhut	Stehag
2021	No tournament held	No tournament held	N/A
2020	No tournament held	No tournament held	N/A
2019	(Scotland) Indy Lennartsson (née Priestman)	(Germany) Katrin Ueberfuhr	Stehag
2018	(England) Jasmine Bosenick	(Germany) Katrin Ueberfuhr	Merrick Leisure Centre, Newton Stewart
2017	(Germany) Katrin Ueberfuhr	(Scotland) Chloe Bruce	Riverford Farm, Devon
2016	(Germany) Amke de Buhr	(Germany) Inga Höben	Dresden
2015	(England) Jasmine Bosenick	(Germany) Gabriele Rose	Merrick Leisure Centre, Newton Stewart
2014	(England) Jasmine Bosenick	(Scotland) Indy Lennartsson (née Priestman)	Riverford Farm, Devon
2013	(Scotland) Indy Priestman	(Germany) Anne Larisch	Dresden
2012	(Scotland) Indy Priestman	(England) Jasmine Bosenick	Riverford Farm, Devon
2011	(Scotland) Stacey Duff	(England) Dilushi Jayasingha	Riverford Farm, Devon
2010	(Scotland) Indy Priestman	(Scotland) Stacey Duff	Merrick Leisure Centre, Newton Stewart
2009	(Scotland) Indy Priestman	(Scotland) Chloe Bruce	Riverford Farm, Devon
2008	(Scotland) Indy Priestman	(Netherlands) Isla Craik	Riverford Farm, Devon
2007	(Scotland) Elizabeth Tindal	(Netherlands) Isla Craik	Riverford Farm, Devon
2006	(Scotland) Indy Priestman	(Netherlands) Isla Craik	Riverford Farm, Devon
2005	(Scotland) Indy Priestman	(Netherlands) Isla Craik	Riverford Farm, Devon
2004	(Scotland) Indy Priestman	(Netherlands) Isla Craik	Riverford Farm, Devon
2003	(Scotland) Indy Priestman	(Scotland) Rachel Chelka	Riverford Farm, Devon
2002	(Scotland) Indy Priestman		Riverford Farm, Devon
2001; 2000; 1999; 1998; 1997; 1996; 1995; 1994; 1993; 1992; 1991	No Women's Singles Played	No Women's Singles Played	
1990	(Australia) Rosey Priestman	(Scotland) Mandi McInnes	Loch Grannoch, Galloway
1989	(Australia) Rosey Priestman		Euchanbank, Galloway
1988	(Australia) Rosey Priestman		Mochrum Park, Galloway
1987	(Australia) Rosey Priestman		Castle Stewart, Galloway
1986	(Australia) Rosey Priestman	(England) Sarah Feldman	Balmaclellan, Galloway
1985	No Women's Singles Played	No Women's Singles Played	Minniwick, Galloway
1984	(Australia) Rosey Priestman		Castle Stewart, Galloway
1983	(Australia) Rosey Priestman		
1982	No Women's Singles Played	No Women's Singles Played	Corriedoo, Galloway
1981			
1980			
1979			
1978			

† Shown is the champion and runner up from the over-18 age category. In 2023 there were strict age limits such that players over 40, including the defending champion Anja Lund, were not permitted to enter the over-18 category.

*Indy Lennartson won the over-40 category, and Anja Lund won the over-50 category and Patricia Poch won the 18+ category, controversially all three have a claim to being the Women's Singles champion of 2023.

=== Mixed doubles world champions by year ===
Year	Winner	Runner-up	Venue
2026	(Germany) Lorenz Ueberfuhr & (Kosovo) Bashkim Mala	(Germany) Willi Kliemann & (Germany) Jerome Dietrich	Neustadt in Sachsen
2025	(Germany) Sebastian Rose & (Germany) Jerome Dietrich	(Germany) Tim Leib & (Germany) Ludwig Grabinsky	Eslöv
2024	(England) Rowan Appleton-Wickens & (Germany) Silke Bruns	(Scotland) Malcolm Heyes & (Germany) Ralph Teichert	London
2023	Not decided	Not decided	Kleinnaundorf
2022	(Germany) Alexander Christen & (Japan) Kyou Colquitt	(Hong Kong) Eric Lo & (Scotland) Bazil Hughes	Stehag
2021	No tournament held	No tournament held	N/A
2020	No tournament held	No tournament held	N/A
2019	(Germany) Sebastian Rose & (England) Hugh Wallis	(Sweden) Finn Lennartsson & (Germany) Hannah Franz	Stehag
2018	(Scotland) Graham Moffat & (England) Jason Littlefield	(Scotland) Indy Lennartsson & (Germany) Lutz Reiter	Merrick Leisure Centre, Newton Stewart
2017	(Scotland) Chloe Bruce & (Germany) Ringo Sobiella	(England) Nik Clark & (England) Taliesin Appleton-Wickens	Riverford Farm, Devon
2016†	(Germany) Dominic Hauke & (Germany) Nadine Harmatschek	(Scotland) Bazil Hughes & (Scotland) Chloe Bruce	Dresden
2015	(Scotland) Bazil Hughes & (England) Taliesin Appleton-Wickens	(Germany) Marco Zink & (Scotland) Kevin Witt	Merrick Leisure Centre, Newton Stewart
2014	(England) Silver Levy-So & (England) Tom Amey	(England) Daniel Francis-Bernson & (England) Finlay Porter	Riverford Farm, Devon
2013	No Mixed Doubles	No Mixed Doubles	Dresden
2012	(Scotland) Malcolm Heyes & (England) Tom Amey	(England) Evan Barretxeguren-Priestman & (Scotland) Seth Priestman	Riverford Farm, Devon
2011	(England) Ezra Cohen & (Scotland) Seth Priestman	(England) Johnny Tillbrook & (Scotland) Malcolm Heyes	Riverford Farm, Devon
2010	(Scotland) Jack Higginson & (England) Saul Woollacott	(Scotland) Andy Priestman & (Scotland) Bazil Hughes	Merrick Leisure Centre, Newton Stewart
2009	(Scotland) Andy Priestman & (Germany) Phillipp Bahner	(Scotland) Indy Priestman & (England) Jack Butcher	Riverford Farm, Devon
2008	(Scotland) Aaron Priestman & (England) Jacob Edwards	(Ghana) Peter McCarthy & (England) Mark Elliott	Riverford Farm, Devon
2007	(Scotland) Aaron Priestman & (England) Richard Cohen	(England) Corin Liddle & (Ghana) Peter McCarthy	Riverford Farm, Devon
2006			Riverford Farm, Devon
2005			Riverford Farm, Devon
2004	(Scotland) Indy Priestman & (England) Mark Elliott	(Scotland) Malcolm Heyes & (Japan) Yukiko Mori	Riverford Farm, Devon
2003	(Scotland) Malcolm Heyes & (Japan) Tomoko Hori	(Scotland) Ben Lockwood & (England) Ezra Cohen	Riverford Farm, Devon
2002			Riverford Farm, Devon
2001	(Scotland) Indy Priestman & (Scotland) Seth Priestman	(Scotland) Aaron Priestman & (Scotland) Malcolm Heyes	Riverford Farm, Devon
2000			Riverford Farm, Devon
1999	(England) Adam Cohen & (England) Oliver Tringham	(Scotland) Malcolm Heyes & (Scotland) Rachel Chelka	Riverford Farm, Devon
1998	(Scotland) Malcolm Heyes & (Australia) Rosey Priestman	(England) Oliver Tringham & (Scotland) Thomas Turnbull	chez Finn & Ella, Garlieston
1997			Minniwick, Galloway
1996	(Scotland) Davey Mackenzie & (England) Peter MacCarthy	(Scotland) Malcolm Heyes & (Scotland) Thomas Turnbull	chez Rex Pyke, Garlieston
1995	(Scotland) Davey Mackenzie & (England) George Howard	(Scotland) Alan Thompson & (Scotland) Dave	Knowe Farm, Galloway
1994	(Scotland) Davey Mackenzie & (Scotland) Seth Priestman		Corriedoo, Galloway
1993	(Scotland) Davey Mackenzie & (England) Guy Feldman	(Scotland) Andy Priestman & (England) Dominic Kennedy	chez Rex Pyke, Garlieston
1992			
1991			
1990	(England) Francis O'Dempsey & (Scotland) Karen Haggis	(Scotland) Vince Thurkettle & Mark	Loch Grannoch, Galloway
1989	(Scotland) Davey Mackenzie & (Scotland) Seth Priestman		Euchanbank, Galloway
1988	(Morocco) Kenneth Dalbrae & (Republic of Ireland) Brendan Colvert	(Scotland) Indy Priestman & (Scotland) Clare Melinsky	Mochrum Park, Galloway
1987	(Scotland) Davey Mackenzie & (Scotland) Chris Heughan		Castle Stewart, Galloway
1986	(Scotland) Mike Sullivan & (England) David Smith	(Scotland) Andy Priestman & (Scotland) Mr. Sullivan	Balmaclellan, Galloway
1985	(Morocco) Kenneth Dalbrae & (Scotland) Tom Jones		Minniwick, Galloway
1984	(Scotland) Andy Priestman & (Australia) Rosey Priestman		Castle Stewart, Galloway
1983	(Morocco) Kenneth Dalbrae & (Scotland) Tom Jones		
1982			Corriedoo, Galloway
1981			
1980			
1979			
1978			

† Denotes years in which doubles pairs were not randomly assigned

=== Men's singles world champions by number of titles ===
Player	Total	Years
(Scotland) Malcolm Heyes	7	1994, 2000, 2002, 2003, 2005, 2006, 2012
(Germany) Alexander Christen	6	2019, 2022, 2023, 2024, 2025, 2026
(Scotland) Bazil Hughes	4	2011, 2013, 2014, 2017
(England) Paddy Bos Coe	3	1997, 1998, 1999
(Scotland) Andy Priestman	3	1984, 1991, 1992
(Germany) Sebastian Rose	2	2015, 2018
(England) Daniel Francis-Bernson	2	2007, 2009
(England) Richard Cohen	2	2001, 2004
(Scotland) Davey Mackenzie	2	1982, 1995
(Germany) Marco Zink	1	2016
(Scotland) Liam Campbell	1	2010
(England) Ezra Cohen	1	2008
(Scotland) Seth Priestman	1	1996
(England) Guy Feldman	1	1993
(Scotland) Mike Sullivan	1	1990
(Republic of Ireland) Brendan Colvert	1	1989
(England) Francis O'Dempsey	1	1988

=== Women's singles world champions by number of titles ===
Player	Total	Years
(Scotland) Indy Lennartsson (née Priestman)	12	2002, 2003, 2004, 2005, 2006, 2008, 2009, 2010, 2012, 2013, 2019, 2026
(Australia) Rosey Priestman	7	1983, 1984, 1986, 1987, 1988, 1989, 1990
(England) Jasmine Bosenick	3	2014, 2015, 2018
(Denmark) Anja Lund	2	2022, 2025
(Germany) Patricia Poch	1	2023
(Germany) Lisa Zink	1	2024
(Germany) Katrin Ueberfuhr	1	2017
(Germany) Amke de Buhr	1	2016
(Scotland) Stacey Duff	1	2011
(Scotland) Elizabeth Tindal	1	2007

=== Multiple-time doubles world champions by number of titles ===
Player	Total	Years
(Scotland) Davey Mackenzie	6	1987, 1989, 1993, 1994, 1995, 1996
(Scotland) Seth Priestman	5	1989, 1994, 2000, 2001, 2011
(Scotland) Malcolm Heyes	4	1997, 1998, 2003, 2012
(Morocco) Kenneth Dalbrae	3	1983, 1985, 1988
(England) Tom Amey	2	2012, 2014
(Germany) Sebastian Rose	2	2019, 2025
(Scotland) Andy Priestman	2	1984, 2009
(Scotland) Aaron Priestman	2	2007, 2008
(Scotland) Indy Lennartsson (née Priestman)	2	2001, 2004
(Australia) Rosey Priestman	2	1984, 1998
(Scotland) Tom Jones	2	1983, 1985

== Full results by year ==
=== 2022 ===
2022 World Tambourelli Championship - Full Results

Men's Singles

Full Knockout Bracket

Round of 16
(Germany) Sebastian Rose
(Germany) Lutz Reiter
(Scotland) Bazil Hughes
(Scotland) Seth Priestman
(Sweden) Finn Lennartsson
(Germany) Ralph Teichert
(Sweden) Isak Lindstedt
(Sweden) Jonas Nyberg
(Sweden) Emil Asegard
(Sweden) Magnus Bjelkefelt
(Germany) Alexander Christen
(Sweden) Jakob Stierna
(England) Rowan Appelton-Wickens
(Germany) Steven Schneider
(Germany) Ringo Sobiella
(Sweden) Peter Andersson

Quarter-finals
(Germany) Sebastian Rose
(Scotland) Bazil Hughes
(Sweden) Finn Lennartsson
(Sweden) Isak Lindstedt
(Sweden) Emil Asegard
(Germany) Alexander Christen
(England) Rowan Appelton-Wickens
(Germany) Ringo Sobiella

Semi-finals
(Germany) Sebastian Rose
(Sweden) Isak Lindstedt
(Germany) Alexander Christen
(England) Rowan Appelton-Wickens

Final
(Sweden) Isak Lindstedt
(Germany) Alexander Christen

Women's Singles

Full Knockout Bracket

Quarter-finals
(Denmark) Anja Lund
(Germany) Daniela Guthens
(Scotland) Indy Lennartsson
(Denmark) Lene Christensen
(Germany) Hannah Franz
(Sweden) Anna Dahlin
(Germany) Carmen Ketelhut
(Germany) Silke Reiter

Semi-finals
(Denmark) Anja Lund
(Scotland) Indy Lennartsson
(Germany) Hannah Franz
(Germany) Carmen Ketelhut

Final
(Denmark) Anja Lund
(Germany) Carmen Ketelhut

Mixed Doubles

The mixed doubles was won by Alexander Christen and Kyou Colquitt

=== 2018 ===
2018 World Tambourelli Championship - Full Results

The 2018 World Tambourelli Championship, hosted by Scottish Tambourelli, took place on the 28th and 29 July at the Merrick Leisure Centre in Newton Stewart, Scotland.

The Men's Singles was won by Sebastian Rose. The Women's Singles was won by Jasmine Bosenick. The Mixed Doubles was won by Graham Moffat and Jason Littlefield.

Men's Singles

Sebastian Rose defeated Bazil Hughes in 2 games in the men's singles final, completing a perfect tournament with no games dropped. This feat has only been performed once before in men's singles, by Liam Campbell in 2010. The final was also the first match in which Bazil Hughes lost in 2 straight games since the same tournament in 2010 against Liam Campbell. With victory Sebastian Rose became the first ever multiple-time men's singles champion from outside the UK, and continued his streak of never having lost a singles match on Scottish soil.

Full Knockout Bracket

Round of 16
(Germany) Sebastian Rose	11,12
(England) Jason Littlefield	4,10
(Scotland) Ringo Sobiella
(England) Clemens
(England) Silver Sky Levy-So	6,9
(Germany) Lutz Reiter	11,11
(Sweden) Finn Lennartsson	11,11
(Indonesia) Mugiri Greenfield	4,5
(England) Hugh Wallis
(Scotland) Malcolm Heyes	11,11
(Sweden) Mons	6,12
(England) Tal Appleton-Wickens	11,13
(Germany) Carsten	5,6
(Scotland) Bazil Hughes	11,11
(Germany) Graham Moffat	11,7,11
(Germany) Lorenz	9,11,5

Quarter-finals
(Germany) Sebastian Rose	11,11
(Germany) Ringo Sobiella	9,6
(Germany) Lutz Reiter
(Sweden) Finn Lennartsson
(Scotland) Malcolm Heyes	5,9
(England) Tal Appleton-Wickens	11,11
(Scotland) Bazil Hughes	11,7,11
(Scotland) Graham Moffat	6,11,6

Semi-finals
(Germany) Sebastian Rose	21,21
(Sweden) Finn Lennartsson	7,7
(England) Tal Appleton-Wickens	10,22,10
(Scotland) Bazil Hughes	21,20,21

Final
(Germany) Sebastian Rose	21,21
(Scotland) Bazil Hughes	15,12

Women's Singles

Jasmine Bosenick won her third World Tambourelli Championship title, winning every game on her way to a convincing victory. This was her third successive victory including only tournaments in which she was participating.

Full Knockout Bracket

Quarter-finals
(Germany) Katrin Ueberfuhr	21
(Scotland) Elizabeth Tindal	12
(Scotland) Indy Lennartsson	11,12
(Germany) Trixi Reuther	8,10
(Scotland) Molly Bruce	6,1
(Germany) Daniela	11,11
(Germany) Jana	6,3
(England) Jasmine Bosenick	11,11

Semi-finals
(Germany) Katrin Ueberfuhr	2
(Scotland) Indy Lennartsson	0
(Germany) Daniela	0
(England) Jasmine Bosenick	2

Final
(Germany) Katrin Ueberfuhr	0
(England) Jasmine Bosenick	2

Mixed Doubles

The Mixed Doubles was won by Graham Moffat and Jason Littlefield, who defeated Indy Lennartsson and Lutz Reiter 11–21, 21–9, 21–13.

Veterans (over 50s) Doubles

The Veterans Doubles was won by Elizabeth Tindal and Hugh Wallis, who defeated Chloe Bruce and Nik Clark.

=== 2017 ===
2017 World Tambourelli Championship - Full Results

The 2017 World Tambourelli Championship, hosted by the Devon Tambourelli Association, took place on the 5th and 6 August on Riverford farm near Totnes in Devon.

The Men's Singles was won by Bazil Hughes. The Women's Singles was won by Katrin Ueberfuhr. The Mixed Doubles was won by Chloe Bruce and Ringo Sobiella. The Luscombe Cup (for children 13 and under) Singles was won by Haruka Takamura. The Luscombe Cup Doubles was won by Nuno Priestman and Noi Priestman.

Men's Singles

Bazil Hughes defeated Marco Zink in 3 games in the Men's Singles final, in a repeat of the previous year's final (which Marco Zink won). The tournament marked the first time that any German player has reached the semi-finals in an outdoor event, with 3 German players making it to the last 4. It is also the first time ever (according to the available records) that the same 2 players have reached the final 2 years in a row. With this win Bazil Hughes claimed his 4th title, taking him to 2nd on the all-time list (after Malcolm Heyes on 7, although it is believed that Andy Priestman has more victories than his official tally of 3).

Full Knockout Bracket

Quarter-finals
(Germany) Ringo Sobiella	2
(England) Luke Watson	0
(Scotland) Bazil Hughes	2
(England) Sean Millar	0
(Germany) Sebastian Rose	2
(England) Tal Appleton-Wickens	0
(Germany) Marco Zink	2
(England) Silver Sky Levy-So	0

Semi-finals
(Germany) Ringo Sobiella	0
(Scotland) Bazil Hughes	2
(Germany) Sebastian Rose	0
(Germany) Marco Zink	2

Final
(Scotland) Bazil Hughes	18,21,21
(Germany) Marco Zink	21,15,16

Women's Singles

Katrin Ueberfuhr won her first World Tambourelli Championship title, coming out of her group in 2nd place but adjusting to the conditions and winning her semi-final and final matches in impressive fashion.

Full Knockout Bracket

Semi-finals
(Scotland) Chloe Bruce	2
(England) Connie Chapman	0
(Germany) Trixi Reuther	0
(Germany) Katrin Ueberfuhr	2

Final
(Scotland) Chloe Bruce	0
(Germany) Katrin Ueberfuhr	2

Mixed Doubles

Ringo Sobiella & Chloe Bruce won the Mixed Doubles tournament, defeating Taliesen Appleton-Wickens & Nik Clark in the final 2 games to 1.

Under 14 Singles

Haruka Takamura won the Luscombe Cup Singles, defeating Nuno Priestman in the final.

Full Knockout Bracket

Quarter-finals
(Japan) Noi	5,20
Ryo	21,21
(Japan) Haruka	21,21
Maple	17,17
(Japan) Nuno	21,21
Kai	16,12
Cosmo	21,21
Lily	11,9

Semi-finals
Ryo	0
(Japan) Haruka	2
(Japan) Nuno	17,21,21
Cosmo	21,18,16

Final
(Japan) Haruka	2
(Japan) Nuno	0

Under 14 Doubles

Nuno Priestman and Noi Priestman won the Luscombe Cup Doubles.

Veterans (over 50s) Doubles

The Veterans Doubles was won by Nick Clarke and Hugh Wallis, who defeated Chloe Bruce and Taro Shiokawa.

=== 2016 ===
2016 World Tambourelli Championship - Full Results

The 2016 World Tambourelli Championship, hosted by Tamburello Dresden, took place on the 27th and 28 August in Dresden.

The Men's Singles was won by Marco Zink. The Women's Singles was won by Make de Buhr.

Men's Singles

Marco Zink defeated Bazil Hughes 11–10 in the third-set tie-breaker to clinch his first World Tambourelli Championship title in dramatic fashion. Marco Zink was the second successive German Men's Singles champion, after Sebastian Rose took home the title the previous year.

Full Knockout Bracket

Quarter-finals
(Germany) Sebastian Rose	2
(Scotland) Bazil Hughes	2
(Germany) Carsten Fink	0
(Spain) Juan Moreno	2
(Germany) Marco Zink	2

Semi-finals
(Germany) Sebastian Rose	0
(Scotland) Bazil Hughes	2
(Spain) Juan Moreno
(Germany) Marco Zink	2

Final
(Scotland) Bazil Hughes	1
(Germany) Marco Zink	2

Women's Singles

Make de Buhr beat Inga Höben in the final to claim her first titles, and become the first German Women's Singles champion.

Full Knockout Bracket

Quarter-finals

Semi-finals
(Germany)
(Germany) Inga Höben	2
(Germany)
(Germany) Amke de Buhr	2

Final
(Germany) Inga Höben
(Germany) Amke de Buhr	2

Mixed Doubles The Mixed Doubles was won by Dominic Hauke & Nadine Harmatschek, who defeated Bazil Hughes & Chloe Bruce in the final in 3 games. In this tournament, the pairs were not randomly drawn as is usually the case but chosen in advance.

=== 2015 ===
2015 World Tambourelli Championship - Full Results

The 2015 World Tambourelli Championship, hosted by Scottish Tambourelli, took place on the 22nd and 23 August at the Merrick Leisure Centre in Newton Stewart, Scotland.

The Men's Singles was won by Sebastian Rose. The Women's Singles was won by Jasmine Bosenick. The Mixed Doubles was won by Taliesen Appleton-Wickens and Bazil Hughes.

Men's Singles

Sebastian Rose defeated Marco Zink in 2 games in the Men's Singles final. Sebastian Rose was not only the first German champion (and along with Marco Zink the first German finalist), but also the first Men's Singles champion from outside the UK. This ended a streak of 5 consecutive Scottish champions, and announced Tamburello Dresden as the new top dogs of the competitive scene.

Full Knockout Bracket

Quarter-finals
(Scotland) Bazil Hughes	1
(Scotland) Liam Campbell	2
(Scotland) Seth Priestman	0
(Germany) Marco Zink	2
(Scotland) Graham Moffat	0
(Germany) Sebastian Rose	2
(Germany) Dominic Hauke
(Scotland) Malcolm Heyes	2

Semi-finals
(Scotland) Liam Campbell	1
(Germany) Marco Zink	2
(Germany) Sebastian Rose	2
(Scotland) Malcolm Heyes	1

Final
(Germany) Marco Zink	0
(Germany) Sebastian Rose	2

Women's Singles

Jasmine Bosenick defeated Gabriele Rose in the final, winning her 2nd (and 2nd consecutive) World Tambourelli Championship title. With this win she became the 3rd player (after Rosey Priestman and Indy Priestman) to win the title more than once.

Full Knockout Bracket

Semi-finals
(Germany) Gabriele Rose	Chloe Bruce
(Scotland)
(Scotland)	Morag Paterson
(England) Jasmine Bosenick	2

Final
(Germany) Gabriele Rose
(England) Jasmine Bosenick	2

Mixed Doubles

Taliesen Appleton-Wickens & Bazil Hughes won the Mixed Doubles tournament, defeating Marco Zink & Kevin Witt in the final.

Veterans (over 50s) Doubles

The Veterans Doubles was won by Nick Wright and Nik Clark, who defeated Chloe Bruce and Hugh Wallis.

=== 2014 ===
2014 World Tambourelli Championship - Full Results

The 2014 World Tambourelli Championship, hosted by the Devon Tambourelli Association, took place on the 2nd and 3 August on Riverford farm near Totnes in Devon.

The Men's Singles was won by Bazil Hughes. The Women's Singles was won by Jasmine Bosenick. The Mixed Doubles was won by Silver Levy-So and Tom Amey.

Men's Singles

Bazil Hughes defeated Finn Lennartsson in 2 games in the Men's Singles final for his 3rd world title. Finn Lennartsson's run was one of the most memorable in Tambourelli history: he came through a razor-tight tie-breaker against Jason Littlefield to escape his group, defeated one of the favorites and Tambourelli greats Malcolm Heyes 2–1 in his quarter final, and defeated another former champion and favorite Daniel Francis-Bernson 2–1 in his semi-final.

However the fairytale run came to an end in the final, played late at night in brutally cold conditions, when the defending champion Bazil Hughes wrapped up a dominant tournament with a decisive 2–0 victory. With this victory Bazil Hughes became the first player since Malcolm Heyes in 2006 to defend his Men's Singles title.

Full Knockout Bracket

Quarter-finals
(England) Ezra Cohen	2
(Scotland) Bazil Hughes	2
(England) Tom Amey	1
(England) Daniel Francis-Bernson	2
(Sweden) Finn Lennartsson	2
(Scotland) Malcolm Heyes	1

Semi-finals
(England) Ezra Cohen	0
(Scotland) Bazil Hughes	2
(England) Daniel Francis-Bernson	1
(Sweden) Finn Lennartsson	2

Final
(Scotland) Bazil Hughes	2
(Sweden) Finn Lennartsson	0

Women's Singles

Jasmine Bosenick won her first World Tambourelli Championship title, ending perhaps the most impressive streak in competitive tambourelli history by becoming the first female player to defeat Indy Lennartsson (née Priestman) in recorded history. She also became the first ever English Women's Singles champion, after 12 consecutive Scottish champions since the Women's Singles tournament restarted in 2002.

Full Knockout Bracket

Semi-finals
(Scotland) Indy Lennartsson	2
(England) Jasmine Bosenick	2

Final
(Scotland) Indy Lennartsson	0
(England) Jasmine Bosenick	2

Mixed Doubles

Silver Levy-So & Tom Amey won the Mixed Doubles tournament, defeating Daniel Francis-Bernson & Finlay Porter in the final.

=== 2013 ===
2013 World Tambourelli Championship - Full Results

The 2013 World Tambourelli Championship, hosted by Tamburello Dresden, took place on the 20th and 21 July in Dresden, Germany. It was the first World Tambourelli Championship to take place outside the UK.

The Men's Singles was won by Bazil Hughes. The Women's Singles was won by Indy Priestman. Unlike in previous years, there was no Mixed Doubles tournament with randomly-assigned pairs but instead Men's Doubles and Women's Doubles tournaments in which players chose their doubles partners in advance. The Men's Doubles was won by Phillip Bahner & David Sobiella. The Women's Doubles was won by Indy Priestman & Chloe Bruce.

Men's Singles

Bazil Hughes defeated Malcolm Heyes in 2 games in the Men's Singles final, winning back the title that Malcolm Heyes won from him in 2012. In the final, Malcolm Heyes started strongly and reached the brink of victory in the first game with a lead of 19 points to 15. However, while leaping forward to win his 19th point, he suffered from cramp in his calf. After a short break he was able to continue, but was unable to sustain the level of play that had given him the lead. Bazil Hughes was able to win the first game 21–20 after saving 5 game points (no deuce was played during this tournament), and then won the second game comfortably to secure the title.

With this win, Bazil Hughes became the 2nd player (after Liam Campbell in 2010) to have been confirmed to go through the Men's Singles tournament without dropping a single game. However this feat may have occurred multiple times pre-2009 - no accurate records of the individual matches played exist.

This tournament used an atypical format in which there was a group stage, a knockout round, a further group stage (with 2 groups of 3 players), and then semi-finals and the final.

Full Knockout Bracket

Semi-finals
(Germany) Sebastian Rose	0
(Scotland) Bazil Hughes	2
(Germany) Till Zeuner
(Scotland) Malcolm Heyes	2

Final
(Scotland) Bazil Hughes	2
(Scotland) Malcolm Heyes	0
Third place
(Germany) Sebastian Rose	2
(Germany) Till Zeuner	0

Women's Singles

Indy Priestman defeated Anne Larische to win an unprecedented 10th World Championship title.

Full Knockout Bracket

Semi-finals

Final
(Scotland) Indy Priestman	2
(Germany) Anne Larische

Doubles

In 2013 there was no Mixed Doubles tournament, but Men's Doubles and Women's Doubles tournaments, in which pairs were chosen by the participants before the tournament began. The Men's Doubles champions were Phillip Bahner & David Sobiella. The Women's Doubles champions were Indy Priestman & Chloe Bruce.

=== 2012 ===
2012 World Tambourelli Championship - Full Results

The 2013 World Tambourelli Championship, hosted by the Devon Tambourelli Association, took place on the 20th and 21 July on Riverford Farm near Totnes in Devon.

The Men's Singles was won by Malcolm Heyes. The Women's Singles was won by Indy Priestman.

Men's Singles

Malcolm Heyes defeated Seth Priestman in 2 games in the Men's Singles final.

Full Knockout Bracket

Quarter-finals
(Scotland) Bazil Hughes	1
(Scotland) Malcolm Heyes	2

Semi-finals
(Scotland) Malcolm Heyes	2
(Scotland) Andy Priestman
(Scotland) Seth Priestman	2

Final
(Scotland) Malcolm Heyes	2
(Scotland) Seth Priestman	0

Women's Singles

Indy Priestman defeated Jasmine Bosenick to win her 9th World Championship title.

Full Knockout Bracket

Semi-finals

Final
(Scotland) Indy Priestman	2
(England) Jasmine Bosenick

Mixed Doubles

Malcolm Heyes & Tom Amey won the Mixed Doubles tournament, defeating Evan Barretxeguren-Priestman & Seth Priestman in the final.

=== 2011 ===
2011 World Tambourelli Championship - Full Results

The 2011 World Tambourelli Championship, hosted by the Devon Tambourelli Association, took place on the 23rd and 24 July on Riverford Farm near Totnes in Devon.

The Men's Singles was won by Bazil Hughes. The Women's Singles was won by Stacey Duff. The Doubles was won by Ezra Cohen & Seth Priestman

Men's Singles

Bazil Hughes defeated the defending champion Liam Campbell in the semi-finals and tambourelli's most-decorated champion Malcolm Heyes in the final to win his first World Championship title. The tournament featured an all-Scottish last 4, and also had a Scottish winner in the Women's Singles tournament, solidifying the return-to-supremacy of Scottish tambourelli.

Full Knockout Bracket

Quarter-finals
(Scotland) Liam Campbell	2
(England) David Elliott	1
(England) Johnny Tillbrook	0
(Scotland) Bazil Hughes	2
(England) Jacob Edwards
(Scotland) Andy Priestman	2
(Scotland) Jack Higginson
(Scotland) Malcolm Heyes	2

Semi-finals
(Scotland) Liam Campbell	0
(Scotland) Bazil Hughes	2
(Scotland) Andy Priestman
(Scotland) Malcolm Heyes	2

Final
(Scotland) Bazil Hughes	2
(Scotland) Malcolm Heyes	1

Women's Singles

Stacey Duff defeated Dilushi Jayasingha in the final to win her first World Championship title. At 17 years of age, she was the youngest Women's Singles champion in tambourelli history.

Full Knockout Bracket

Quarter-finals
(Scotland) Stacey Duff	2
(England) Rachel Chelka
(Netherlands) Isla Craik	2
(England) Julia Elliott
(Scotland) Chloe Bruce	2
(England) Cassie-Anne Osborne
(England) Dilushi Jayasingha	2
(Scotland) Elizabeth Tindal

Semi-finals
(Scotland) Stacey Duff	2
(Netherlands) Isla Craik
(Scotland) Chloe Bruce
(England) Dilushi Jayasingha	2

Final
(Scotland) Stacey Duff	2
(England) Dilushi Jayasingha	1

Mixed Doubles

Ezra Cohen & Seth Priestman won the Mixed Doubles tournament, defeating Johnny Tillbrook & Malcolm Heyes in the final.

=== 2010 ===
2010 World Tambourelli Championship - Full Results

The 2010 World Tambourelli Championship, hosted by Scottish Tambourelli, took place on Saturday the 31st of July and Sunday the 1st of August in the Merrick Leisure Centre in Newton Stewart.

The Men's Singles was won by Liam Campbell. The Women's Singles was won by Indy Priestman. The Doubles was won by Jack Higginson and Saul Woollacott

Men's Singles

Liam Campbell, who was reigning under-16s World Champion and had only just turned 16, produced perhaps the most dominant Men's Singles tournament in tambourelli history to take the World Championship title in his first attempt. Not only did he win every game in the tournament - a first since verified records began - he did so in spectacularly dominant fashion. In the 14 individual games he played (8 during the knockout stages and 6 in the group stages), he limited his opponent to 13 points or fewer in all but 1 game (all games to 21). So not only did he win every game he played, but he was only in any danger of losing once - a 21–19 victory over Bazil Hughes in the Round of 16, which he followed with a swift 21–11 win in game 2.

With this win Liam Campbell became the youngest ever Men's Singles champion, the most dominant ever Men's Singles champion, and the only player to win the tournament in their very first attempt (excluding the first tournament ever held). He also brought Scottish tambourelli back to prominence, not only by ending a run of 3 consecutive English champions but also by emphatically dispatching Ezra Cohen, who was playing in his 4th consecutive final, by a scoreline of 21–12, 21–13.

Full Knockout Bracket

Quarter-finals
(Scotland) Liam Campbell	21,21
(Scotland) Bazil Hughes	19,11
(Scotland) Graham Moffat	2
(Scotland) Jack Higginson

Semi-finals
(Scotland) Liam Campbell	21,19
(Scotland) Graham Moffat	6,6
(Scotland) Malcolm Heyes	0
(England) Ezra Cohen	2

Final
(Scotland) Liam Campbell	21,21
(England) Ezra Cohen	12,13

Women's Singles

Indy Priestman defeated Stacey Duff in the final to win her 8th World Tambourelli championship title.

Full Knockout Bracket

Quarter-finals

Semi-finals

Final
(Scotland) Indy Priestman	2
(Scotland) Stacey Duff

Mixed Doubles

Jack Higginson & Saul Woollacott won the Mixed Doubles tournament, defeating Andy Priestman & Bazil Hughes in the final.

== The German Open - Dresden ==
=== 2018 ===
10. German Open - Full Results

The 9th German Open, hosted by Tamburello Dresden, took place on Saturday the 22nd and Sunday the 23rd of September 2018 in Dresden, Germany.

The Men's Singles was won by Alexander Christen. The Women's Singles was won by Inga Höben. The Men's Doubles was won by Taliesin Appleton-Wickens & Bazil Hughes. The Women's Doubles was won by Nadine Harmatschek & Laura Stolzer. The Mixed Doubles was won by Nadine Harmatschek & Dominic Hauke.

Men's Singles

Full Knockout Bracket

Quarter-finals
(Germany) Marco Zink
(Germany)
(Germany) Sebastian Rose
(Germany)
(Scotland) Bazil Hughes	21,21
(England) Taliesin Appleton-Wickens
(Germany) Alexander Christen	21,21

Semi-finals
(Germany) Marco Zink
(Germany) Sebastian Rose	21,21
(Scotland) Bazil Hughes	11,6
(Germany) Alexander Christen	21,21

Final
(Germany) Sebastian Rose	6,16
(Germany) Alexander Christen	21,21
Third place
(Scotland) Bazil Hughes
(Germany) Marco Zink

=== 2017 ===
9. German Open - Full Results

The 9th German Open, hosted by Tamburello Dresden, took place on Saturday the 23rd and Sunday the 24th of September 2017 in Dresden, Germany.

The Men's Singles was won by Alexander Christen. The Women's Singles was won by Inga Höben. The Men's Doubles was won by Taliesin Appleton-Wickens & Bazil Hughes. The Women's Doubles was won by . The Mixed Doubles was won by Alexander Christen & Gabriele Rose.

Men's Singles

Full Knockout Bracket

Quarter-finals
(Germany) Marco Zink	7,11
(Scotland) Bazil Hughes	11,6
(Germany) Sebastian Rose	11,11
(Germany) Ringo Sobiella	5,4
(Germany) Dominic Hauke	11,11
(Germany) Carsten Fink	8,9
(Germany) Alexander Christen	11,11
(England) Taliesin Appleton-Wickens	5,3

Semi-finals
(Germany) Marco Zink	13,14
(Germany) Sebastian Rose	21,21
(Germany) Dominic Hauke	11,9
(Germany) Alexander Christen	21,21

Final
(Germany) Sebastian Rose	16,19
(Germany) Alexander Christen	21,21
Third place
(Germany) Marco Zink
(Germany) Dominic Hauke

Women's Singles

Full Knockout Bracket

Quarter-finals
(Germany) Inga Höben	11,11
(Germany) Lydia Wünsche	4,4
(Germany) Stefanie Juhr	5,5
(Germany) Kathleen Schubbert	11,11
(Germany) Carmen Gobsch	11,11
(Germany) Runa Ziesch	0,0
(Germany) Gabriele Rose	10,4
(Germany) Trixi Reuther	11,11

Semi-finals
(Germany) Inga Höben	21,21
(Germany) Kathleen Schubbert	16,14
(Germany) Carmen Gobsch	21,21
(Germany) Trixi Reuther	15,10

Final
(Germany) Inga Höben	21,16,11
(Germany) Carmen Gobsch	16,21,7
Third place
(Germany) Kathleen Schubbert	21,21
(Germany) Trixi Reuther	15,12
