= Guy Singh-Watson =

Ethical farming businessman

Guy Singh-Watson (né Watson; born 1960) is a British farmer and founder and creator of Riverford, an organic farm and UK-wide organic vegetable box delivery company.

== Biography ==
Singh-Watson was born in Totnes. He was brought up on Riverford Farm, in Buckfastleigh, Devon, which was taken over by his family in the 1950s. After studying Agricultural and Forestry Science at the University of Oxford he became a management consultant, but left after working in New York City for a while.

In 1986 Singh-Watson returned to the farm, deciding to convert it to farming organically. In the 1990s, to find an effective way of distributing his produce, he developed the weekly vegetable box scheme, which is delivered directly to customers' doors with locally grown produce. In 2015 the Riverford business was valued at £45 million.

In 2018 Singh-Watson sold 76% of Riverford Organic Farmers to the trustee of an employee ownership trust. In 2023 Singh-Watson agreed to sell his remaining 23% stake for almost £10m, making the firm 100% staff-owned.

Singh-Watson lectures on ethical business and is a judge for the Observer Ethical Awards and his leadership has seen five previous Observer awards including Best Ethical Business and Best Ethical Restaurant in 2009.

Singh-Watson married Geetie Singh in 2014. He is a keen surfboarder. In July 2018 he was interviewed on BBC Radio 4's Desert Island Discs programme.

== Publications ==
- Riverford Farm Cook Book: Tales from the Fields, Recipes from the Kitchen (2008) Singh-Watson, G. and Baxter, J. ISBN 978-0-00-726505-3
