= Bricklehampton =

Village in Worcestershire, England

Coordinates: 52.08°N 2.03°W

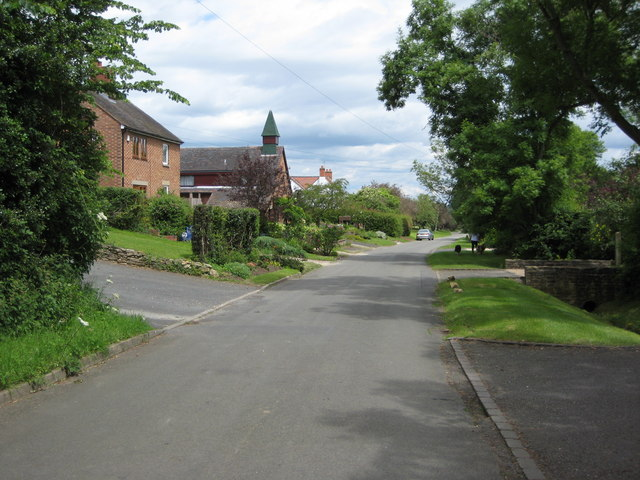
- Bricklehampton

- Location within Worcestershire
- Population: 236
- OS grid reference: SO980424
  - London: 92 miles (148 km)
- District: Wychavon
- Shire county: Worcestershire
- Region: West Midlands
- Country: England
- Sovereign state: United Kingdom
- Post town: PERSHORE
- Postcode district: WR10
- Dialling code: 01386
- Police: West Mercia
- Fire: Hereford and Worcester
- Ambulance: West Midlands

Bricklehampton is a village and civil parish in Worcestershire, England. In the 2021 census the population of the parish was recorded as 236. Its area is 369.7 hectares (1.427 sq mi). The village shares a parish council with Elmley Castle and Netherton.

== History ==
The name at the time of the Domesday Book in 1086 was Bricstelmenstune.

Bricklehampton's parish church, dedicated to St Michael and All Angels, is a grade II listed building. The medieval church was rebuilt and restored in 1875-1877 but the 12th-century font and south doorway remain. As of November 2020 there are 12 listed buildings in the parish, all at grade II, including the 1848 mansion Bricklehampton Hall, now a nursing home, and a K6 telephone box.

== Name ==
The name Bricklehampton derives from the Old English Beorthelmingtūn or Brihthelmingtūn, meaning 'settlement connected with Beorthelm/Brihthelm'.

According to linguist David Crystal, the 14-letter town name is perhaps the longest one-word place name in the English-speaking world that does not repeat any letter. Two places named Buslingthorpe (one in Leeds and in one in Lincolnshire) and Buckfastleigh in Devon had previously been thought to share this honour, with 13 unique letters.
