= Pallone =

Several traditional Italian ball games

Pallone (pronounced [palˈloːne]; Italian for an inflated ball, source of the English word balloon) is the name of several traditional ball games, played in all regions of Italy, with few differences in regulations.

== Forms ==
=== Pallone col bracciale ===
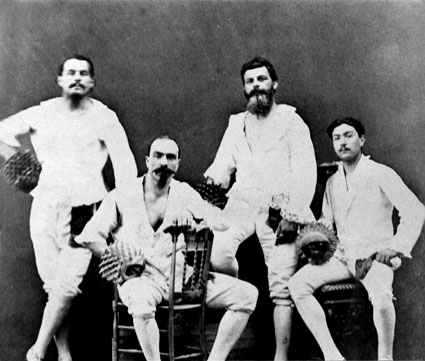
Pallone col bracciale team, middle 19th century

Pallone col bracciale, or simply bracciale, was particularly popular throughout Italy and it was considered the most popular sport of ancient Italian national sports since the 16th century; its first official regulations invented by Antonio Scaino from Salò date back to 1555. This sport and its champions were described by Johann Wolfgang von Goethe, Karl Philipp Moritz, Christian Joseph Jagemann, Richard Colt Hoare, Jacob Burckhardt, William Wetmore Story, Giacomo Leopardi, Edmondo de Amicis, Giuseppe Baretti, Antonio Francesco Grazzini, Ottavio Rinuccini, Gabriello Chiabrera, Tommaso Grossi and Giuseppe Gioachino Belli. Bracciale was played also in France, Germany, Austria, England, Netherlands and famous Italian champions organized tournaments in USA, Argentina and Egypt. Where Angels Fear to Tread (1991) includes a brief film depiction of this game.

Balls are struck back and forth with a wooden cylinder, called bracciale, worn over the forearm: if carelessly played, a broken arm can result because a bracciale weighs 1 to 2 kilograms. Originally the ball was inflated, but now a hard rubber ball is used: this ball has circumference of 39 centimetres and weighs 350 grams (originally 750 grams). Scoring is by fifteens and tens, as in tennis, in this manner: 15 – 30 – 40 – 50 for victory in a game but earlier it was 15 – 30 – 45 – 60; the team which wins 12 games is final winner of the match. A notable feature is that the ball is put into play by a designated server for both teams, called the mandarino, who otherwise is not part of the game. The receivers can reject serves at will. Pallone is often played on courts marked out on town streets.

Four kinds of pallone are now played:

- it is played in particular sports venue called sphaeristerium, or in Italian sferisterio, 80 metres long and 18 metres wide with a lateral wall which is 20 metres high and permits the rebound of the ball. In this version each team has 3 players: battitore, spalla and terzino
- it is played in an open playing field without lateral walls. In this version each team has 4 players: battitore, spalla and 2 terzino
- it is played by 2 players versus other 2 players with a net (device) in central position of court
- it is played by 1 solo player versus other 1 solo player with a net in central position of court.

=== Pallapugno ===
Pallapugno, or formerly pallone elastico, is a game originally played in Piedmont and Liguria with a bandaged fist. This sport and its champions were described by Cesare Pavese, Beppe Fenoglio and Giovanni Arpino. In the second half of the 20th century a championship was organized in California and played during various years. The professional Italian Pallapugno League is the top level of competition: in 2008 ten teams competed.

Each team has four players. The court, or sferisterio, is 90 metres long and 18 metres wide; the rubber ball has a diameter of 10.5 centimetres and weighs 190 grams. Scoring is also by fifteens and tens in every game, but a second bounce can result in a "chase" rather than an outright point, similar to real tennis; the team which wins 11 games is the winner of the match.

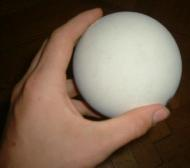
Rubber pallapugno ball

=== Pallapugno leggera ===
Pallapugno leggera is played in a court the same size of a volleyball court, but without a net. Each team has 4 players with 2 reserve players. A match consists of one set or three sets. This game is played in all Italian 20 regions and they dispute regular championship.

=== Pantalera ===
Pantalera or pallapugno alla pantalera is generally played on urban streets. The first action of every match consists of playing the ball onto a roof called pantalera in Piedmontese language. Other rules are the same as pallapugno.

=== Hit ball ===
This form was invented by Italian physical education teacher Luigi Gigante in 1986 and in 1992 started a regular championship. Each team has 5 players and there are 2 goals at ends of court.

=== Pallonetto ===
Pallonetto or pallonetto ligure al lungo is generally played on urban streets with tennis balls without covering felt. The playing field is long, between 60 and 90 metres, with a width of 18 metres, with or without a lateral wall. Players strike the ball using one bandaged hand in these versions:

- 1 player versus 1 player
- 2 players versus 2 players
- 3 players versus 3 players.

Whoever wins 5 games is the winner of the match; other rules are the same of pallapugno. Other versions of this game are:

- pallonetto al corto
- pallonetto ai tetti
- pallonetto of Chiusavecchia
- baletta
- ciappetta

== See also ==
- Ball of wind
- Italian variants
  - Palla
  - Tamburello
- Similar ball games
  - Frisian handball
  - Llargues
- Handball International Championships
  - International game

== Video ==
- Pallapugno match
