= Sphaeristerium =

Sphaeristerium (Latin; from the Greek σφαιριστήριον; from σφαῖρα, ball) is a term in Classical architecture given to a large open space connected with the Roman thermae for exercise with balls after the bather had been anointed. They were also provided in Roman villas.

== Sports ==
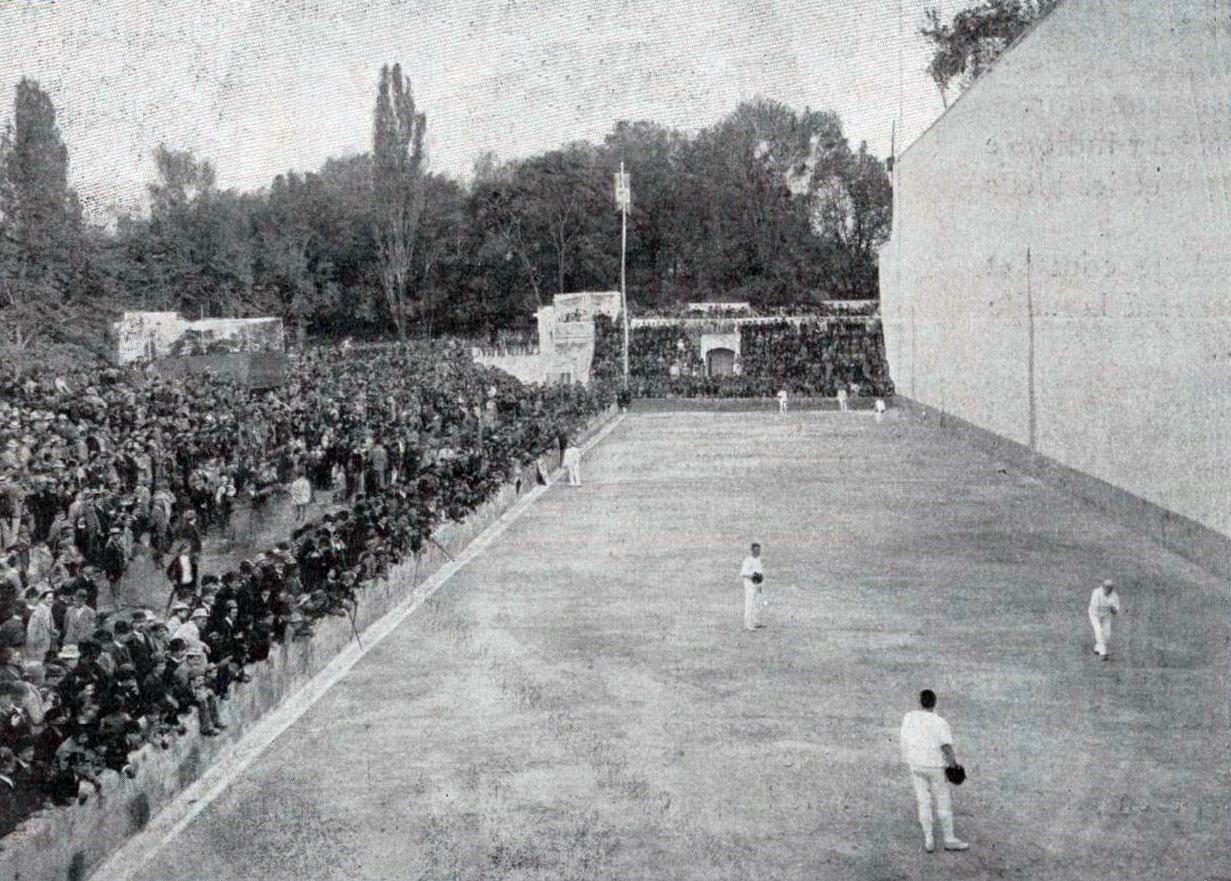
Sferisterio delle Cascine at Florence, 19th century

In Italian sferisterio is nowadays the courtfield for tamburello and two different pallone varieties: pallone col bracciale and pallone elastico. These are rectangular smooth grounds with a high wall on one of the long sides. Sizes change depending on the variety: 16 meters (52 ft) wide and 86 meters (282 ft) long for the pallone col bracciale, and 18 meters (59 ft) and 90 meters (300 ft) for the pallone elastico.
