= Tamburello =

Italian court game

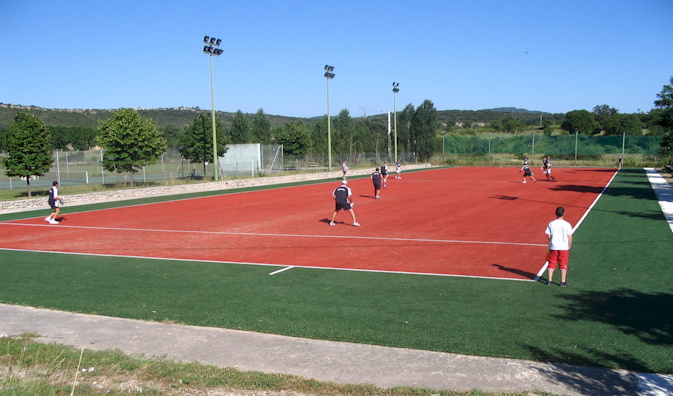
- Players in action
- Highest governing body: International Federation of Tamburello
- First played: 16th century in Italy

Characteristics
- Contact: None
- Team members: 5 outdoor and 3 indoor
- Mixed-sex: Separate competitions
- Type: Ball games
- Equipment: Tambourines and balls
- Venue: Outdoor and indoor

Presence
- Country or region: Europe, Asia, America

Tamburello, named Tambass in Piedmont, is a court game invented in the northern provinces of Italy during the 16th century. It is a modification of the ancient game of pallone col bracciale, bearing the same general relation to it as Squash does to Racquets. Tamburello is also similar in form to tennis.

Tamburello and its variations remain popular today in many nations of the world.

== Forms ==
=== Open ===
This form is played at professional level in Italy where there are two varieties. The first kind takes place in a specialised sports venue called a sphaeristerium (sferisterio in Italian), with a lateral wall which permits the ball to rebound. The second kind is played in an open playing field without a lateral wall. A full-sized tamburello court, which need not be as true and even as that for pallone, is 90 to 100 yards (82 to 91 m) long and half as wide, divided laterally through the middle by a line (cordino) into two equal spaces, the battuta and the rimessa. Five players regularly form a side, each carrying in one hand an implement called a tamburello, hence the sport name, which is a round frame of plastic over which a cover of polymer is tightly stretched. A rubber ball generally larger than a tennis ball is used. One of the players opens the service (battuta), which begins from a small square called the trampolino, situated at one corner of the battuta but outside the court. The service must be over the middle line. The ball must then be hit from side to side over the line, with the side failing to return it or sending it out of court losing a point. The game is scored like lawn tennis, with four points constituting a game, counting 15+15+10+10.

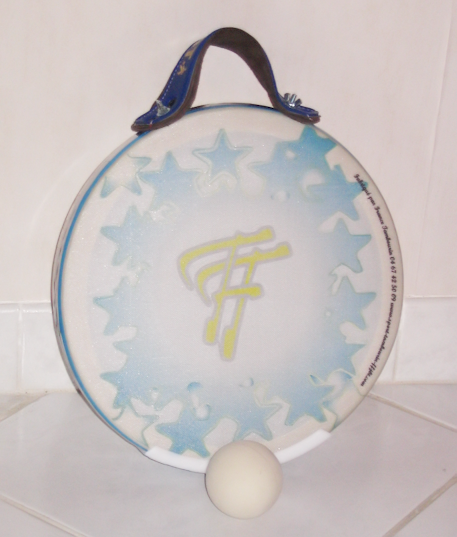
Tamburello rounded shape with ball used in open

=== Indoor ===
Tamburello indoor is practiced in an enclosed space such as a sports hall or a school gym on a small field. Each team has a maximum of eight players, with three simultaneously in the field. The ball in this case cannot be made of rubber, because it is too fast, and then using the tennis ball type depressurized. This is the tamburello's form more prevalent among the world: they play at least in 20 nations.

=== Tambeach ===
Tambeach is played on sand, so players must hit the ball in flight before it contacts the ground. Players stand on a field which is 24x12 metres split in half by a net high 2.15 m. One player plays versus another, or two players versus another two, like beach tennis.

=== Tambutennis ===
In tambutennis, two players regularly stand in each side on a court split in half by a net like tennis. The ball used in this game is made with terrycloth.

=== Tambourelli ===
Tambourelli is a form which was started by Scottish players. It is similar to tambeach and badminton, because they play with a shuttlecock.
