= Buckfastleigh Town Hall =

Municipal building in Buckfastleigh, Devon, England

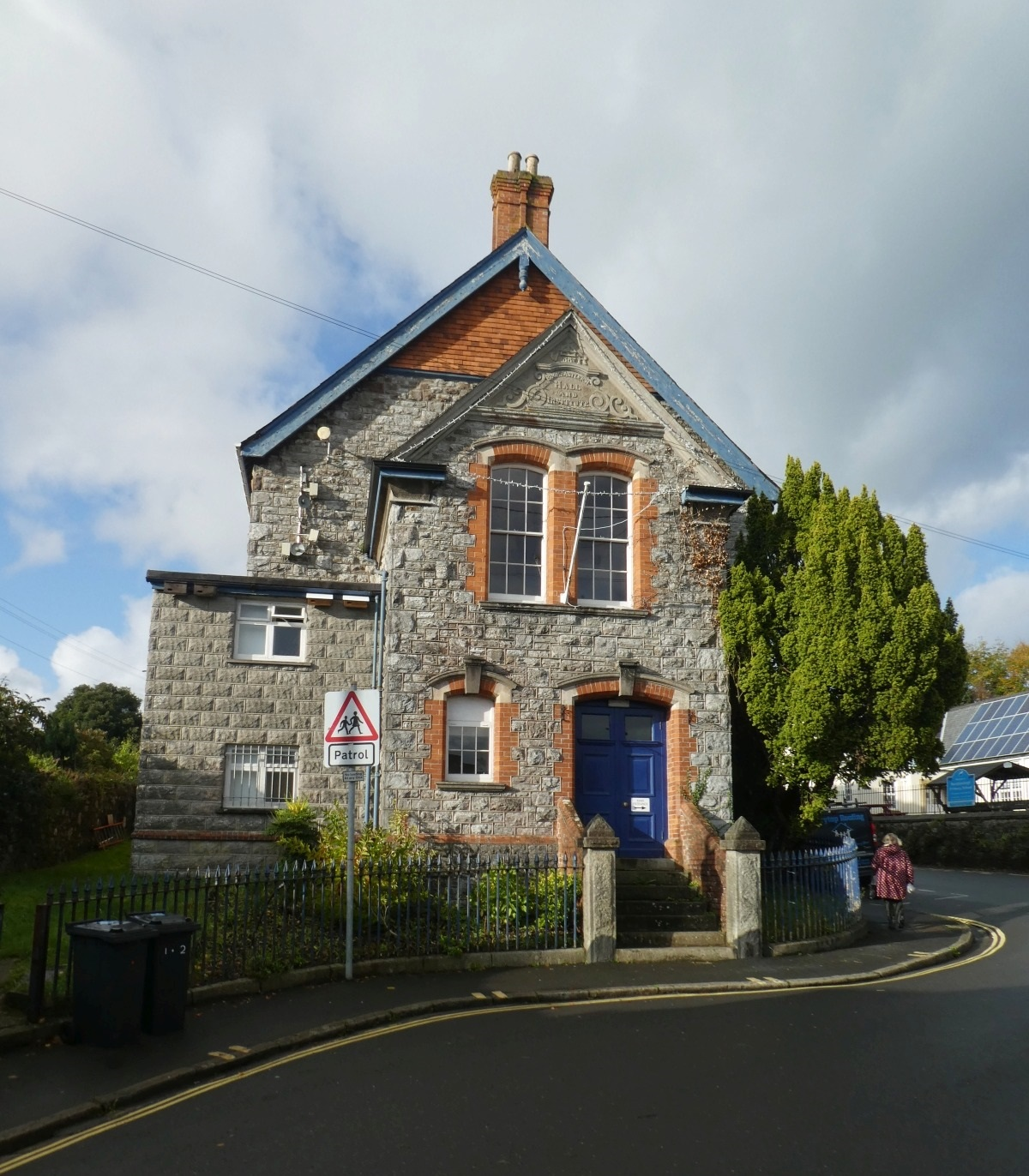
- The building in 2019

- Shown in Devon
- 50.48062°N 3.7800°W
- Location: Bossell Road, Buckfastleigh

History
- Built: 1887

Site notes
- Architect(s): James Hine of Hine and Odgers
- Architectural style: Neoclassical style

Buckfastleigh Town Hall is a municipal building in Bossell Road in Buckfastleigh, a town in Devon, in England. It currently accommodates the offices and meeting place of Buckfastleigh Town Council.

== History ==
The building was commissioned by the Hamlyn family as part of celebrations to commemorate the Golden Jubilee of Queen Victoria. Joseph Hamlyn and his youngest son, William, were the proprietors the Town Mill, the largest of the woollen mills in Buckfastleigh at that time. Joseph also had two other sons, James and John. James Hamlyn became a director of the Buckfastleigh, Totnes and South Devon Railway. The site they selected for the town hall was on the south side of Bossell Road, the road that led to Bossell House, a mansion that James Hamlyn had built in 1880.

The new building was designed by James Hine of the firm of Hine & Odgers in Plymouth, in the neoclassical style, built in a mix of red brick and rubble masonry and was completed in 1887. The design involved a narrow main frontage of two bays facing northeast with a longer frontage of four bays stretching out behind along Bossell Road. There was a short flight of steps leading up to a segmental headed doorway with a keystone in the right-hand bay. The left-hand bay was fenestrated by a small segmental headed window on the ground floor and there was a pair of segmental headed sash windows, which were linked together, on the first floor. There was an open pediment above with the words "Hall and Institute" carved into the tympanum. Internally, the principal rooms were a town hall, a mechanics' institute, a library and a technical school.

The town hall was extended along Bossell Road by an extra five bays in 1924. The Hamlyn family put the town hall into a charity, and in 1952, Buckfastleigh Town Council became the trustees of the charity. Buckfastleigh Urban District Council, which had been based at Harewood House further to the west along Bossell Road, relocated to the town hall in the 1960s. However, this was short-lived as the town hall ceased to be the local seat of government when Teignbridge District Council was formed in 1974. Since then, the town hall has continued to serve as a library, and to provide space for community events, as well as serving as the offices and meeting place of Buckfastleigh Town Council.

Works of art in the town hall include portraits of three members of the Hamlyn family: Joseph (1809–1888) by Worthy Vizard, John (1816–1878) by Warwick Henry Mann, and William Junior (1852–1941) by an unknown artist.
