= Joint Mitnor Cave =

Cave in Devon, England

- Bone Cave
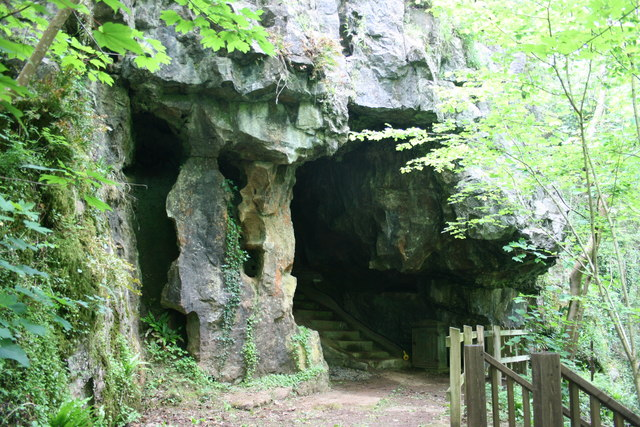
- Entrance to the cave

- Location within Devon
- Location: Higher Kiln Quarry, Buckfastleigh
- OS grid: SX 7434 6644
- Coordinates: 50.484170°N 3.772634°W
- Geology: Limestone
- Access: By permission

Joint Mitnor Cave, also known as Bone Cave, is a limestone cave situated in the now disused Higher Kiln Quarry near Buckfastleigh, in Devon, England. The cave is one of a number at the quarry and in the surrounding area, and is managed by the Pengelly Trust.

== Palaeontology ==
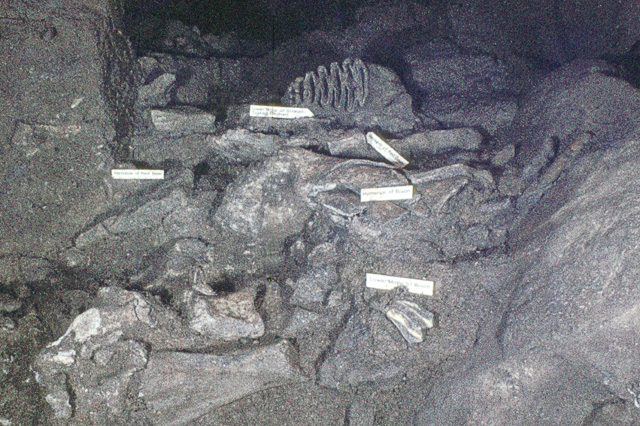
Bone heap in the cave

The cave has been excavated and its animal remains examined on several occasions. The first period of excavation was in 1939–41, when over 4000 mammal bones were discovered deposited in the cave.

In September 2015, thieves broke into the cave (despite its locked steel door) and stole a number of fossil bones which were on display in their original setting. Reconstructions of the stolen fossils were later produced by 3D printing by academics and put on show in the cave in their place. The caves were later reopened by the great-grandson of the original founder, Joshua Burroughs.
