= St Michael's Church, Buslingthorpe =

Coordinates: 53.3523°N 0.3797°W

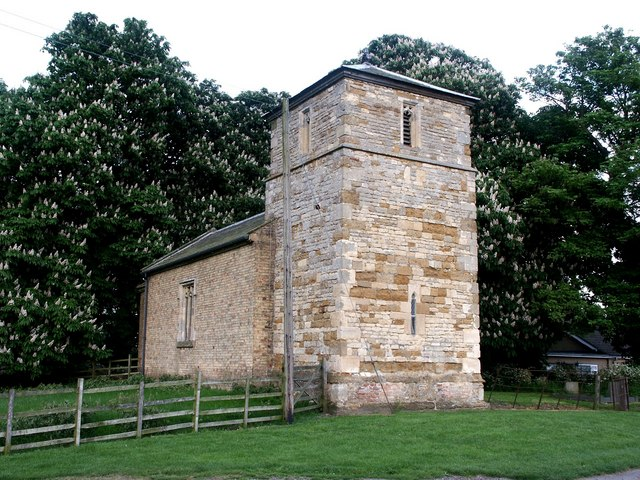
- St Michael's Church, Buslingthorpe, from the northwest

- Location in Lincolnshire
- OS grid reference: TF 079 852
- Location: Buslingthorpe, Lincolnshire
- Country: England
- Denomination: Anglican
- Website: Churches Conservation Trust

History
- Dedication: Saint Michael

Architecture
- Functional status: Redundant
- Heritage designation: Grade II*
- Designated: 1 November 1966
- Architect(s): A. J. Wilson (restoration and rebuilding)
- Architectural type: Church
- Style: Gothic, Gothic Revival
- Groundbreaking: 13th century
- Completed: 1835

Specifications
- Materials: Limestone and brick Slate roofs

St Michael's Church is a redundant Anglican church in the hamlet of Buslingthorpe, Lincolnshire, England. It is recorded in the National Heritage List for England as a designated Grade II* listed building, and is under the care of the Churches Conservation Trust. It stands in an isolated position adjacent to a partly moated farm to the east of the A46 road. The church is notable for two mediaeval monuments to members of the Buslingthorpe family.

== History ==
The church dates from the 13th century, with alterations and additions in the following century. In 1835 it was restored and, other than the tower, was rebuilt in brick by Edward James Willson. The church stands on the site of a deserted mediaeval village. It was declared redundant in 1984.

== Architecture ==
=== Exterior ===
St Michael's is constructed in coursed limestone rubble and yellow brick, with ashlar dressings. The roofs are in slate, with stone coped gables. Its plan is simple, and consists of a nave, a chancel and a west tower. The tower has two stages, is set on a plinth, and has a pyramidal roof. In the lower stage is a lancet window on the west side. The upper stage contains single-light bell openings with ogee heads on each side. There are three-light windows in the north wall of the nave and at the east end, and two similar windows on the south wall of the nave. The doorway is on the south side, and has a pointed head.

=== Interior ===
All the fittings date from the 19th century, other than the font; this has a re-used octagonal bowl. The east window contains fragments of 14th-century stained glass. One of the monuments to the Buslingthorpe family dates from the late 14th century. It consists of a tomb chest bearing the effigy of a knight, his feet resting on a lion, and his head on a cushion which is supported by angels. He is dressed in chain mail, a helmet and a surcoat. The tomb chest is decorated by a frieze carved with quatrefoils containing shields. The other monument dates from the early 14th century, and consists of a limestone tombstone with an inscription around its edge. It contains a brass showing a knight in chain mail and surcoat, his head resting on a pillow, and his hands holding a heart. It is one of the earliest military brasses in England.

== External features ==
The churchyard contains the war grave of an Essex Regiment soldier of the First World War.

== See also ==
- List of churches preserved by the Churches Conservation Trust in the East of England
