= Netherton, Worcestershire =

Hamlet in Worcestershire, England

Coordinates: 52.072358°N 2.014575°W

Netherton
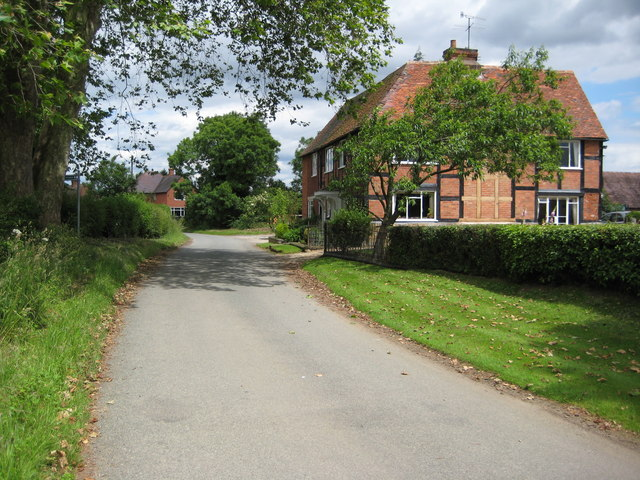
- Timber-framed house in Netherton

- Location within Worcestershire
- Population: 50
- OS grid reference: SO991416
  - London: 90 miles (140 km)
- Civil parish: Elmley Castle, Bricklehampton & Netherton
- District: Wychavon
- Shire county: Worcestershire
- Region: West Midlands
- Country: England
- Sovereign state: United Kingdom
- Post town: EVESHAM
- Postcode district: WR10
- Dialling code: 01386
- Police: West Mercia
- Fire: Hereford and Worcester
- Ambulance: West Midlands

Netherton is a hamlet with population of 50 living in 20 households. It is part of the civil parish of Elmley Castle, Bricklehampton & Netherton in the Wychavon district of Worcestershire, and lies about a mile from Elmley Castle. Evesham, the nearest town, is five miles East North East. To the south-west lies Bredon Hill.

== History ==
The hamlet contains the remains of a 12th-century chapel, and is on the edge of the northern slopes of the Bredon Hill Area of Outstanding Natural Beauty. The Anglican parish was annexed to Elmley Castle in 1864.
