= Pennywell Farm =

Farm tourist attraction in Devon, England

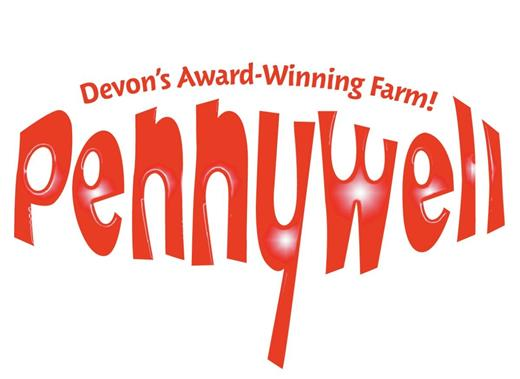

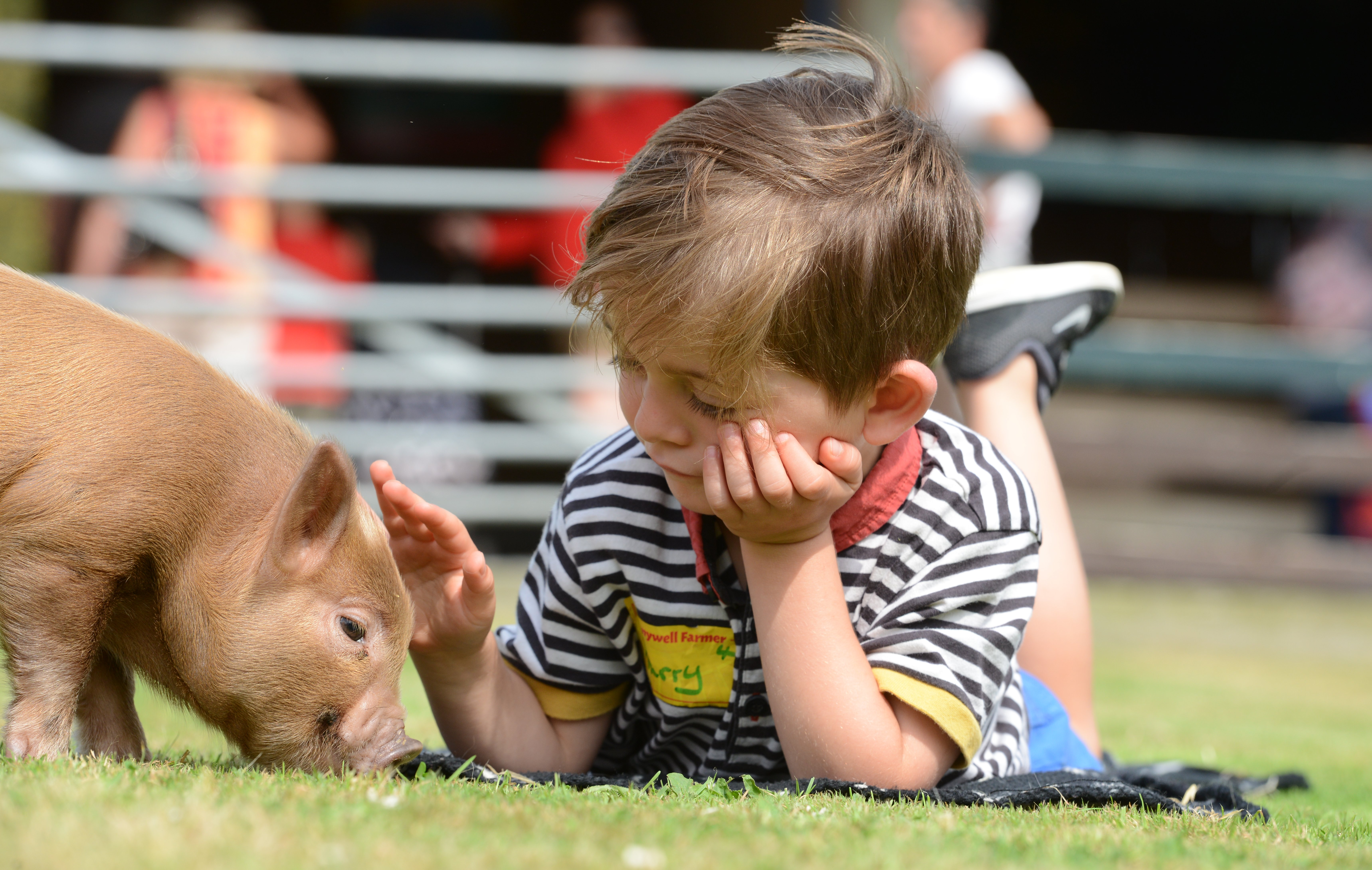
- Boy stroking miniature pig at Pennywell Farm
- Interactive map of Pennywell Farm
- Location: Devon
- Coordinates: 50°27′33″N 3°46′37″W
- Opened: May 1, 1989
- Owner: Christopher and Nicola Murray
- Operating season: February to October
- Website: www.pennywellfarm.co.uk

Pennywell Farm is a tourist attraction just outside the town of Buckfastleigh in south Devon, England. It is an activity farm in the South West region. Pennywell is home to over 150 animals and offers visitors a different hands-on activity every half hour.

The farm has received positive aggregate reviews on travel websites. It was voted “Devon's Best Family Attraction” in the “Muddy Stilettos Awards 2022”.

Pennywell Farm is situated 600 feet (180 m) above sea level and overlooks Dartmoor National Park.

== History ==
Pennywell Farm was founded by Christopher and Nicola Murray, who opened the attraction to the public on 22 May 1989. With no buildings, power, water, or infrastructure in place, the farm began as a greenfield site and was developed entirely from scratch.

The farm was designed to allow visitors to interact directly with the animals.

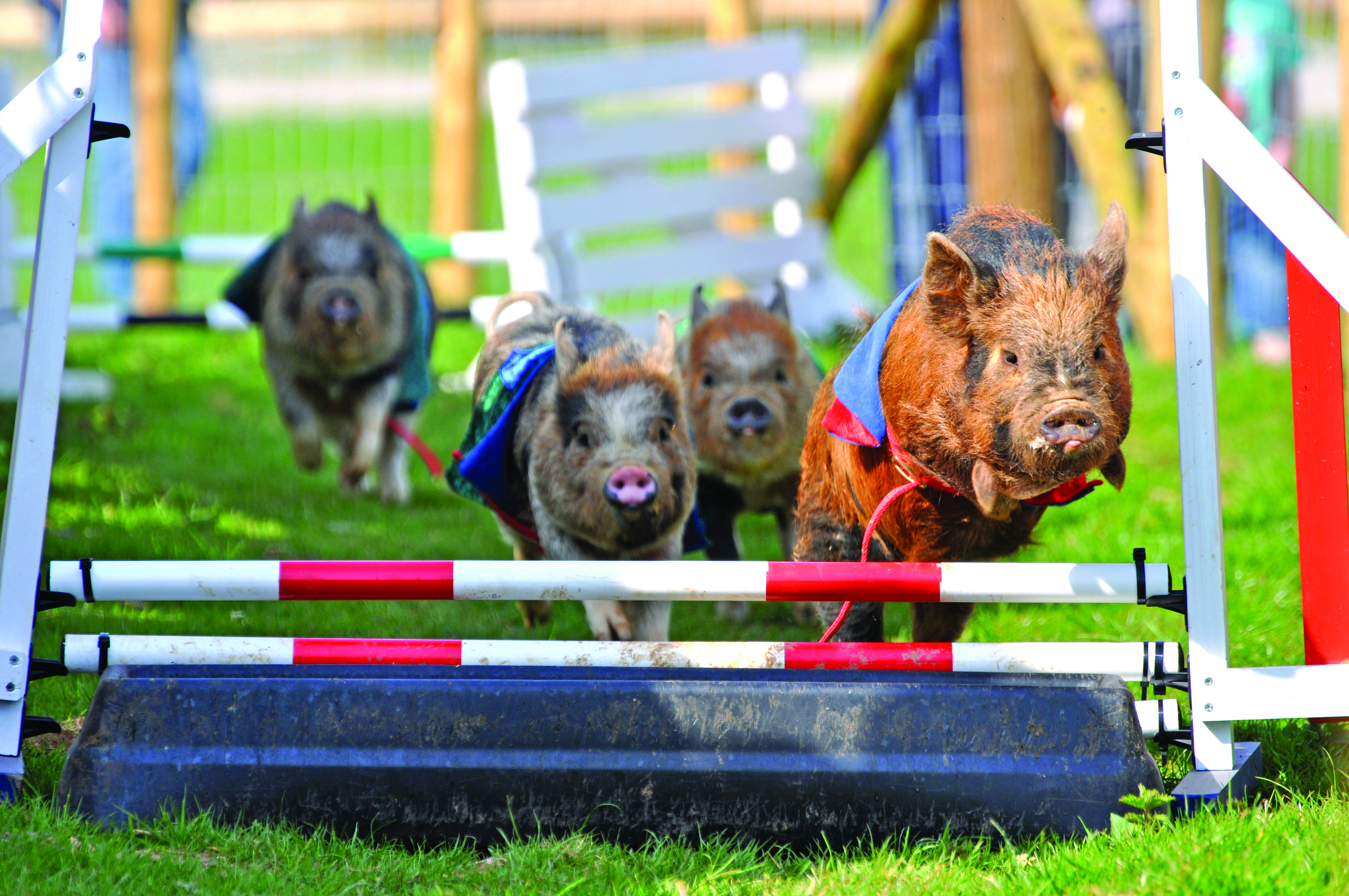
Pig racing at Pennywell Farm

Pennywell became the first attraction in the UK to offer a new, hands-on activity every half hour – a concept that has since been adopted by other farm parks nationwide. Following the implementation of this model, other farm parks in the UK adopted similar scheduled activity formats.

The Pennywell Miniature Pigs shot to fame in 2007 and attracted a whole host of celebrity owners. Media interest followed we have had film crews from Germany, Japan, America, Australia, South Korea as well as the BBC, ITV and Sky.

Pennywell Farm was the first tourist attraction in Devon and the first farm attraction in the country to be awarded Gold in the Green Tourism Business Scheme.

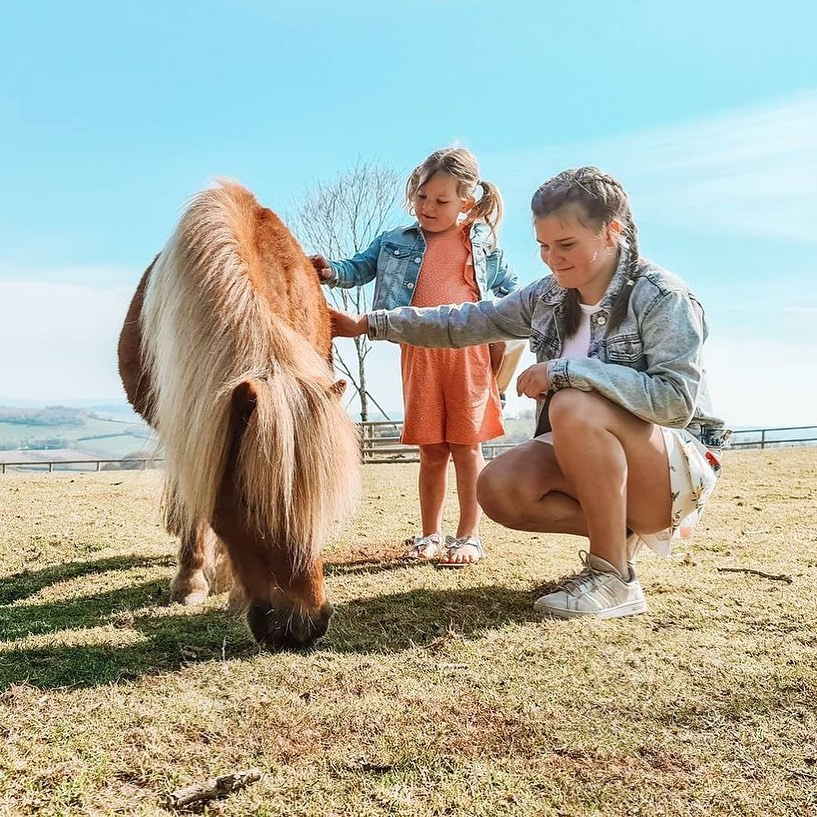
Meeting the miniature ponies at Pennywell Farm

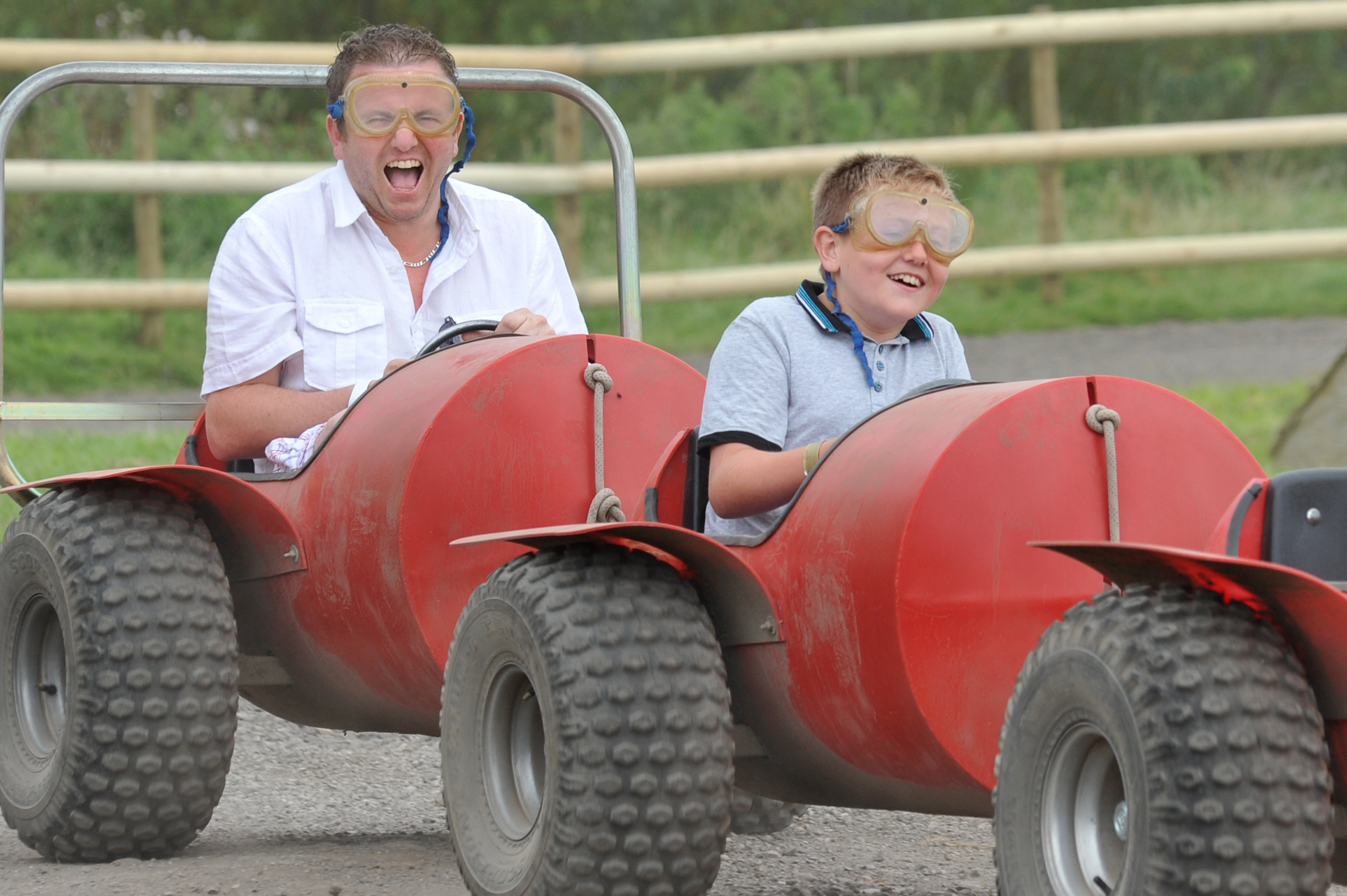
Red rocket ride at Pennywell Farm

Over the years, the farm overcame significant challenges, including the 2001 foot-and-mouth outbreak. During this time, Pennywell lost around 85% of its business but was saved by an anonymous donation – a moment the owners credit as life-changing. In 2003, the farm was visited by the Countess of Wessex (now the Duchess of Edinburgh), who marked English Tourism Week with a ceremonial tree planting. The farm also became known for its community involvement and charitable work. The Christmas Nativity event began in 1990 for local schools and expanded in subsequent years.

Today, Pennywell remains a family business, with the second generation of the Murray family involved in day-to-day operations. The farm is open to the public and remains a family-owned business.
