= Buslingthorpe, Leeds =

Area of Leeds, England

Coordinates: 53.8136°N 1.5383°W

Buslingthorpe
- Location within West Yorkshire
- Metropolitan borough: City of Leeds
- Metropolitan county: West Yorkshire
- Region: Yorkshire and the Humber
- Country: England
- Sovereign state: United Kingdom
- Post town: LEEDS
- Postcode district: LS7
- Dialling code: 0113
- Police: West Yorkshire
- Fire: West Yorkshire
- Ambulance: Yorkshire
- UK Parliament: Leeds Central and Headingley

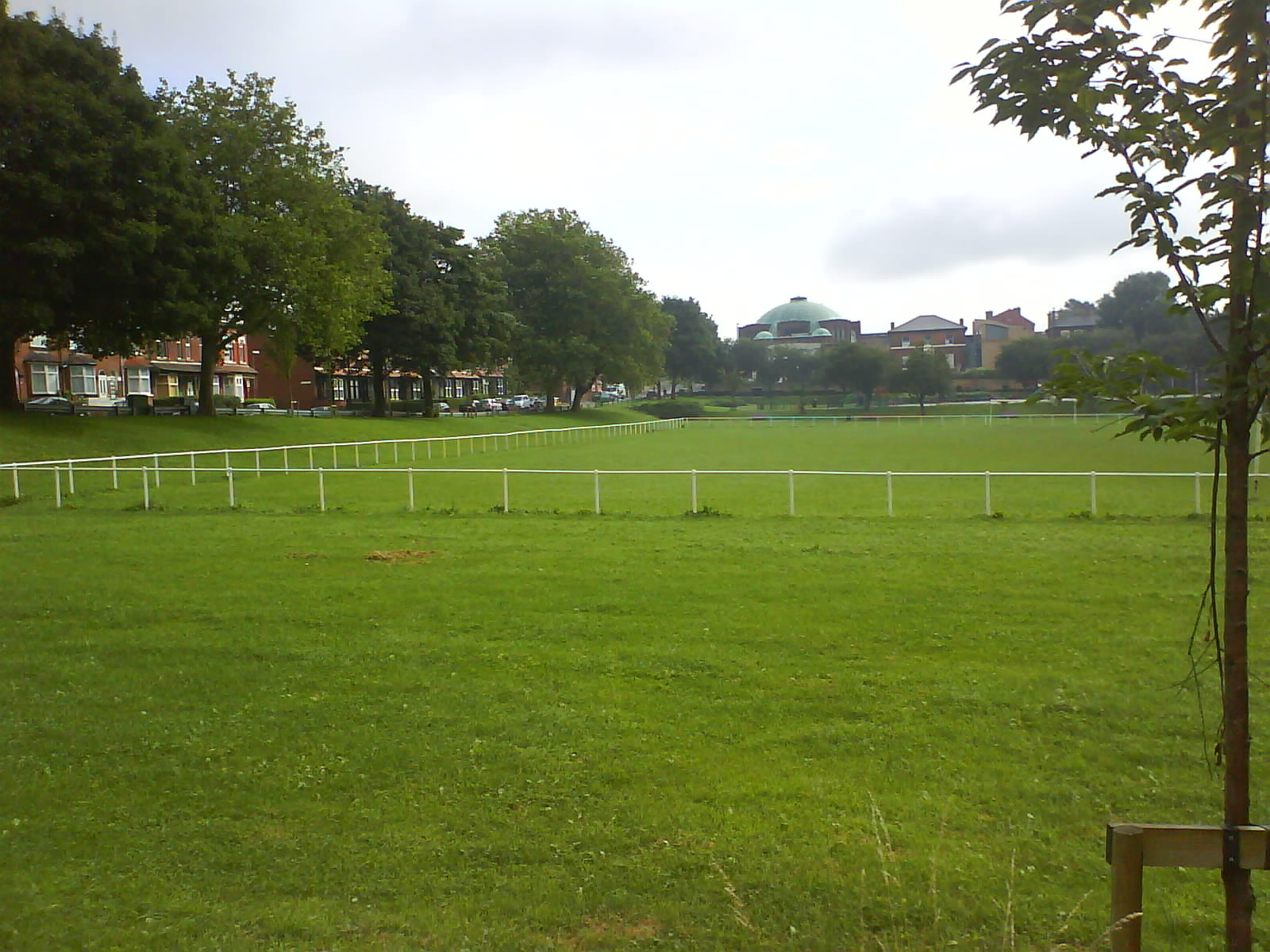
Norma Hutchinson Park

Buslingthorpe is an area of Leeds, West Yorkshire, England. It is about one mile north of the city centre and currently falls within the Little London and Woodhouse ward of the City of Leeds Council. Much of the housing in the area was demolished by slum clearance in the 1950s.

== Etymology ==
The name of Buslingthorpe is first attested in 1258 as Buselingtorpe. It is possible that the place borrowed its name from Buslingthorpe in Lincolnshire, but thought more likely that the two names were coined independently, from the Old French personal name Buselin and the word thorpe ('secondary settlement, outlying farmstead', itself borrowed into English from Old Norse þorp). Thus the name Buslingthorpe originally meant 'Buselin's farmstead'.

A writer in Notes and Queries in 1932 noted that Buslingthorpe (shared with the Lincolnshire Buslingthorpe and Buckfastleigh, Devon) contains 13 different letters, exactly half the alphabet, none repeated and with no hyphenation. The writer wondered if it was unique. The same question was raised earlier in Strand Magazine in 1921. In 2007 David Crystal noted that Bricklehampton surpasses this with 14 unique letters.

Buslingthorpe's recreation ground was named Norma Hutchinson Park in 2009 to commemorate Jamaican-born councillor Norma Hutchinson who died in 2004.

== History ==
Buslingthorpe was an ecclesiastical parish from 1849 to 1955. Between 1870 and 1872, it was a chapelry in the parish of Leeds, with a population of 4,548 living in 998 houses.

The Church of St Michael was built in 1852–1854 on Buslingthorpe Lane and demolished in the late 1950s or early 1960s. The architect was O. W. Burleigh, of Leeds.
