= Buslingthorpe, Lincolnshire =

Hamlet and civil parish in Lincolnshire, England

Coordinates: 53°21′N 0°22′W

Buslingthorpe
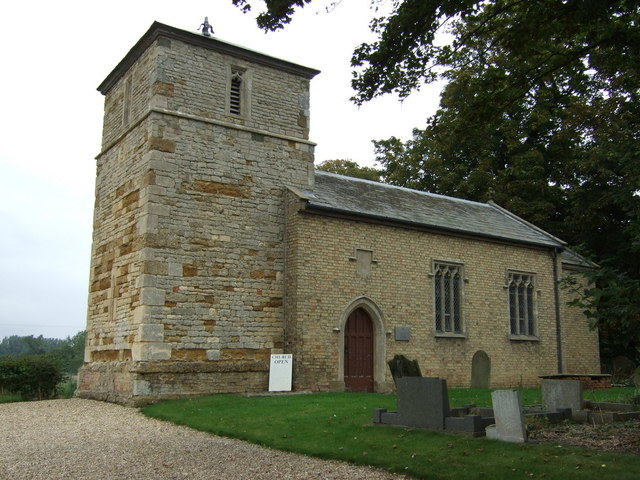
- St Michael's Church in Buslingthorpe

- Location within Lincolnshire
- OS grid reference: TF0885
  - London: 130 mi (210 km) S
- District: West Lindsey
- Shire county: Lincolnshire
- Region: East Midlands
- Country: England
- Sovereign state: United Kingdom
- Post town: Lincoln
- Postcode district: LN3
- Police: Lincolnshire
- Fire: Lincolnshire
- Ambulance: East Midlands

Buslingthorpe is a hamlet and civil parish in the West Lindsey district of Lincolnshire, England. It is half a mile east of the A46 at Faldingworth and 3 miles (5 km) south-west from Market Rasen.

The hamlet is approximately 3 square miles (7.8 km^{2}) in area and comprises a moat, one farm, St Michael's Church (now disused but open to the public) and approximately 20 houses. A large manor house was constructed in approximately 2010 on the land of two demolished houses.

A writer in Notes and Queries in 1932 noted that the Buslingthorpe (shared with Buslingthorpe, Leeds and Buckfastleigh, Devon) contains 13 different letters, exactly half the alphabet, with none repeated and no hyphenation: a heterogram, and wondered whether that was unique. In 2007 David Crystal noted that Bricklehampton in Worcestershire surpasses this with 14 unique letters.

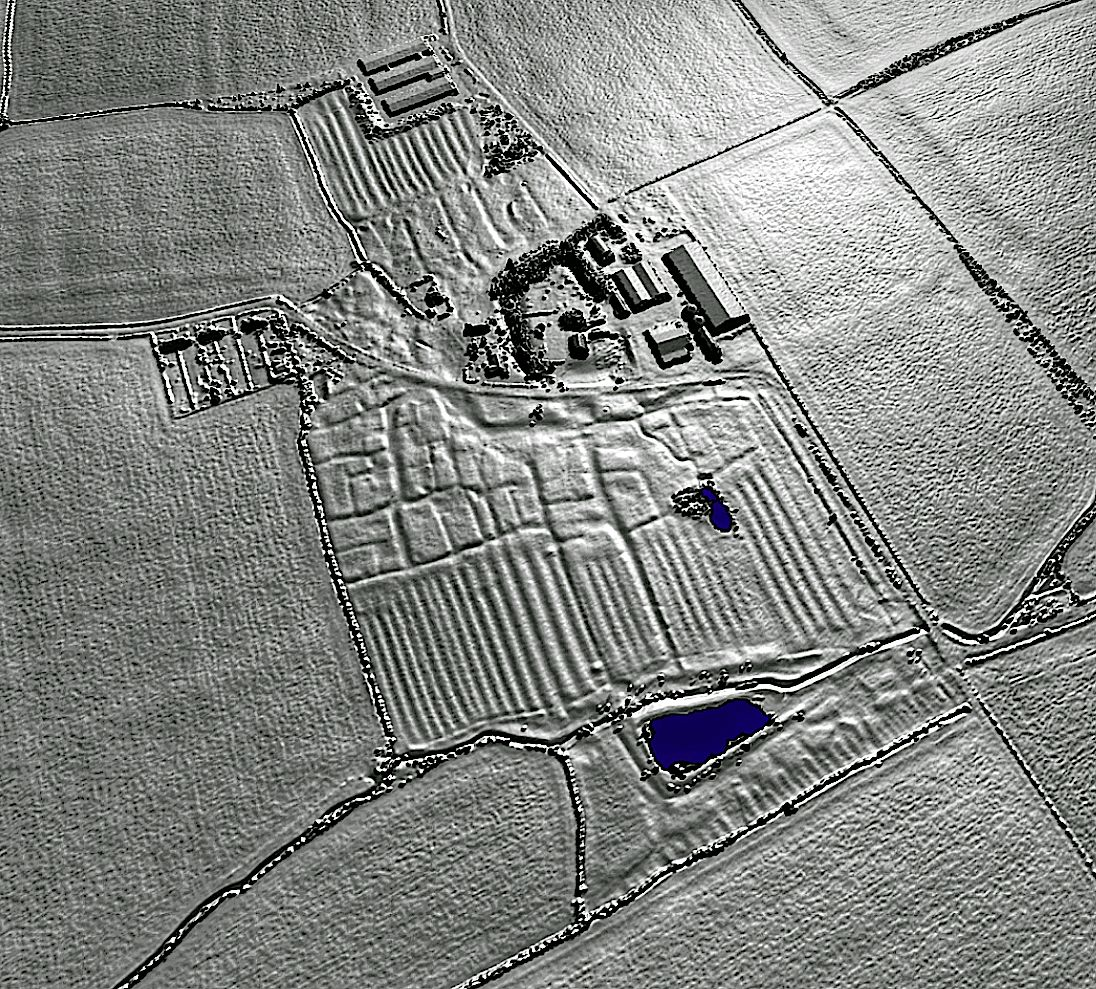
A lidar view of Buslingthorpe and the layout of its deserted medieval settlement.

== Notable people ==
- Sir Roger Scruton (1944-2020), English philosopher and writer
