= Riverford =

British organic farm

Riverford Organic Farmers Ltd
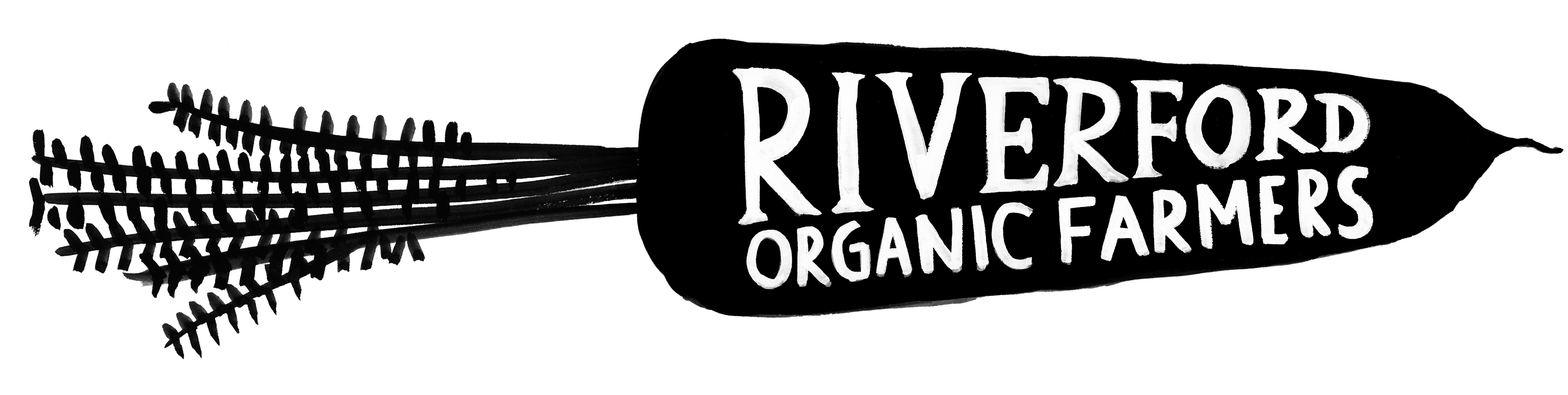

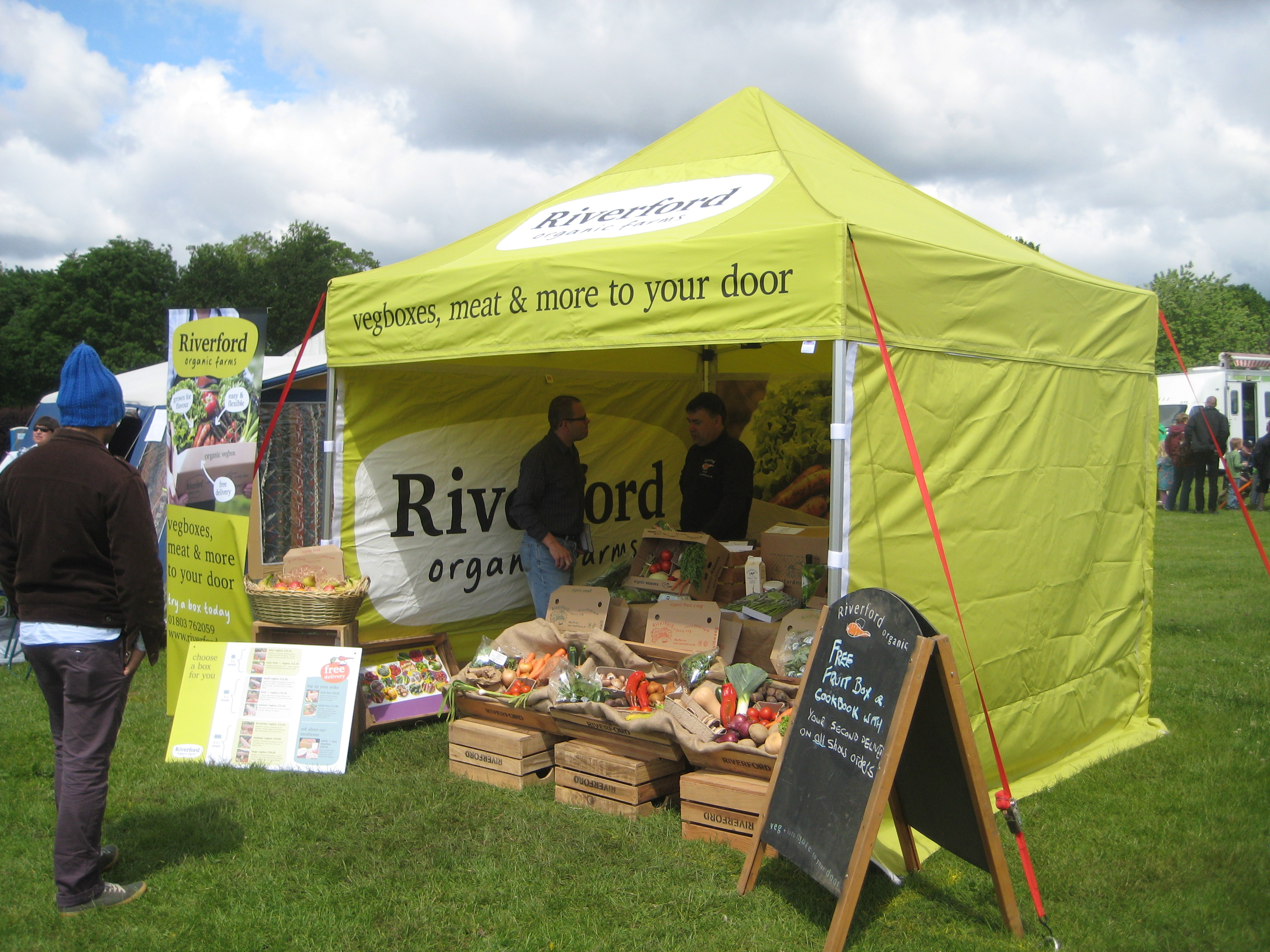
- Company type: Private limited company
- Industry: Agriculture, Internet retail
- Founded: 1987
- Founder: Guy Singh-Watson
- Headquarters: Buckfastleigh, England
- Area served: United Kingdom
- Key people: Guy Singh-Watson (Chairman); Robert Haward (CEO)
- Products: Organic vegetables, fruit, dairy, meat, recipe boxes, meal kits
- Production output: 3,200,000 deliveries (2024)
- Revenue: £108 million (2024)
- Net income: £6.7 million (2024)
- Owners: Employee-owned trust (100%)
- Number of employees: 1014 (2024)
- Website: www.riverford.co.uk

Riverford Organic Farmers Ltd is an organic farm and organic vegetable box delivery company founded by Guy Singh-Watson in Devon, England, but with sister farms in three locations around the country.

== Background ==
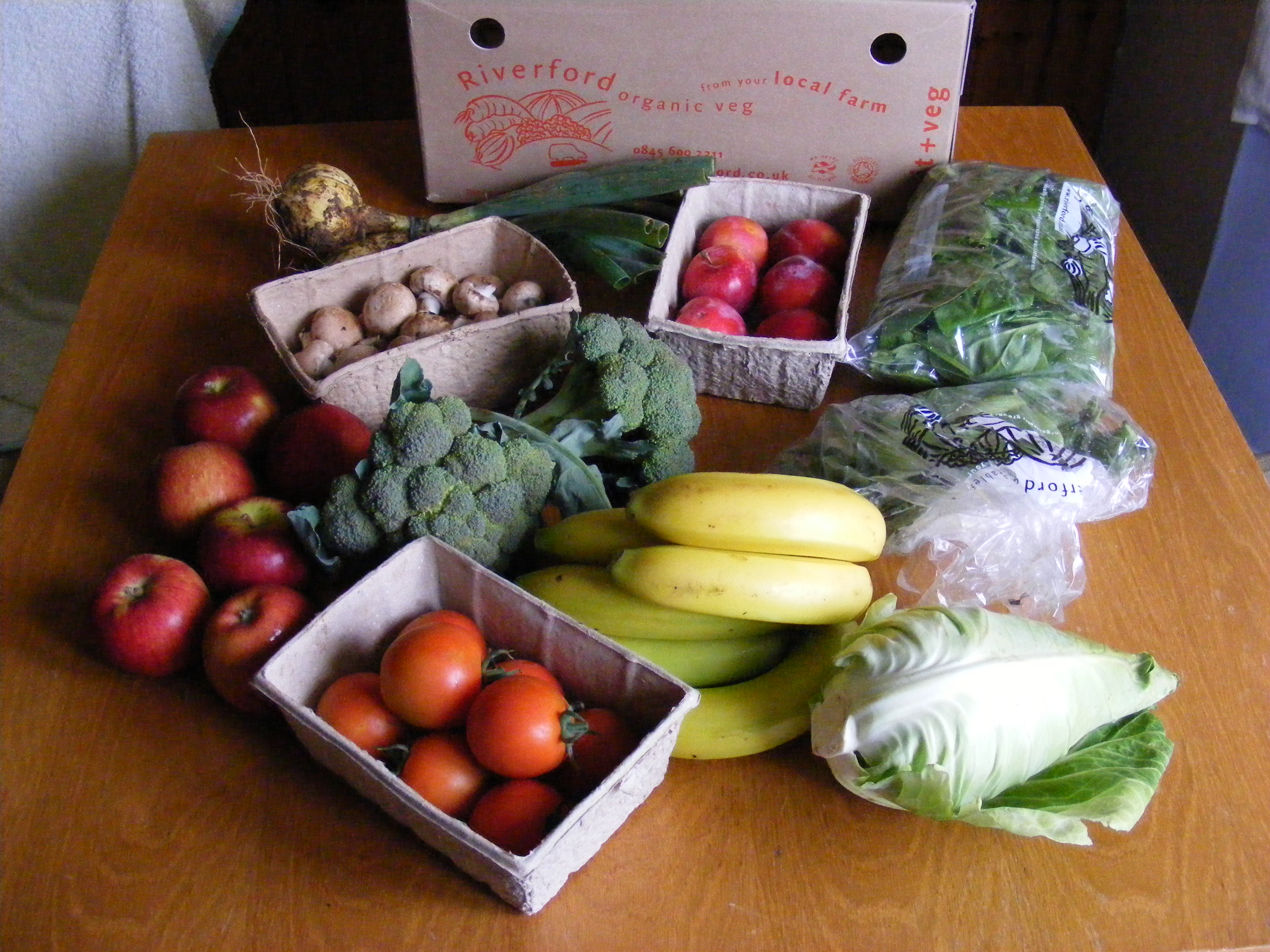
The contents of a Riverford fruit and vegetable box from July 2009

Riverford Farm was taken over by the Watson family in the 1950s and followed the normal pattern for British farms until the mid-1980s, when Guy Singh-Watson (then Guy Watson) decided to convert to organic farming. By the late 1980s, this had been achieved. Singh-Watson aimed to find an effective way of distributing his produce. His idea was the weekly vegetable box scheme, the box being delivered directly to customers' doors with locally grown produce.

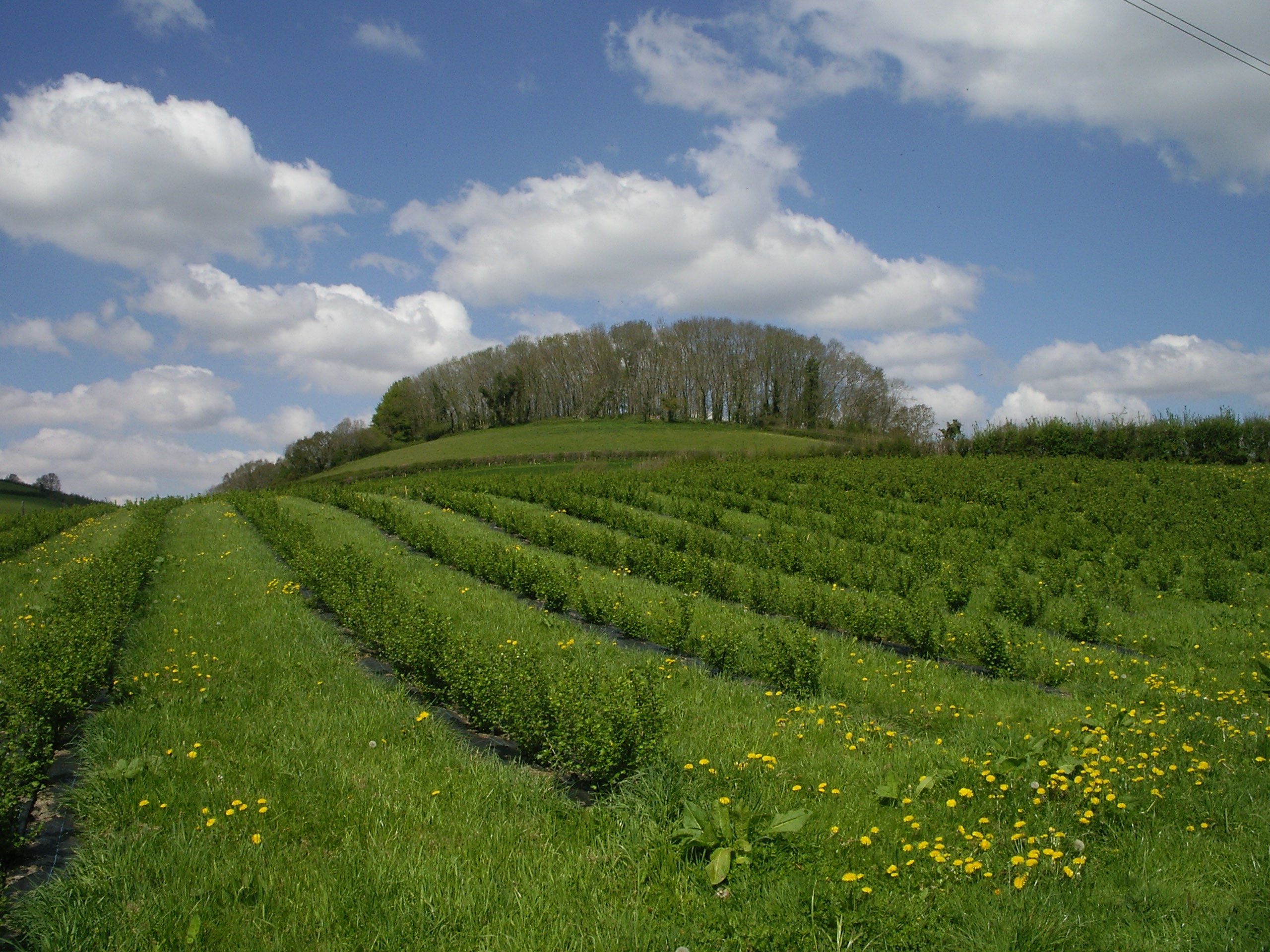
Riverford Farm, Buckfastleigh

Riverford chooses varieties for flavour rather than appearance and delivers earthy vegetables, which improves storage and taste.

Starting from a weekly delivery of around 30 boxes to family and friends, in 2019 Riverford delivered around 50,000 boxes per week to households nationwide, sending its own meat and vegetables as well as organic fruit, dairy, wine, store cupboard staples and more. To achieve this they have formed a mutual cooperative of British farmers - not all in Devon. The weekly boxes come with a newsletter explaining the content of the box, giving farm news from Riverford and providing appropriate recipes.

== History ==
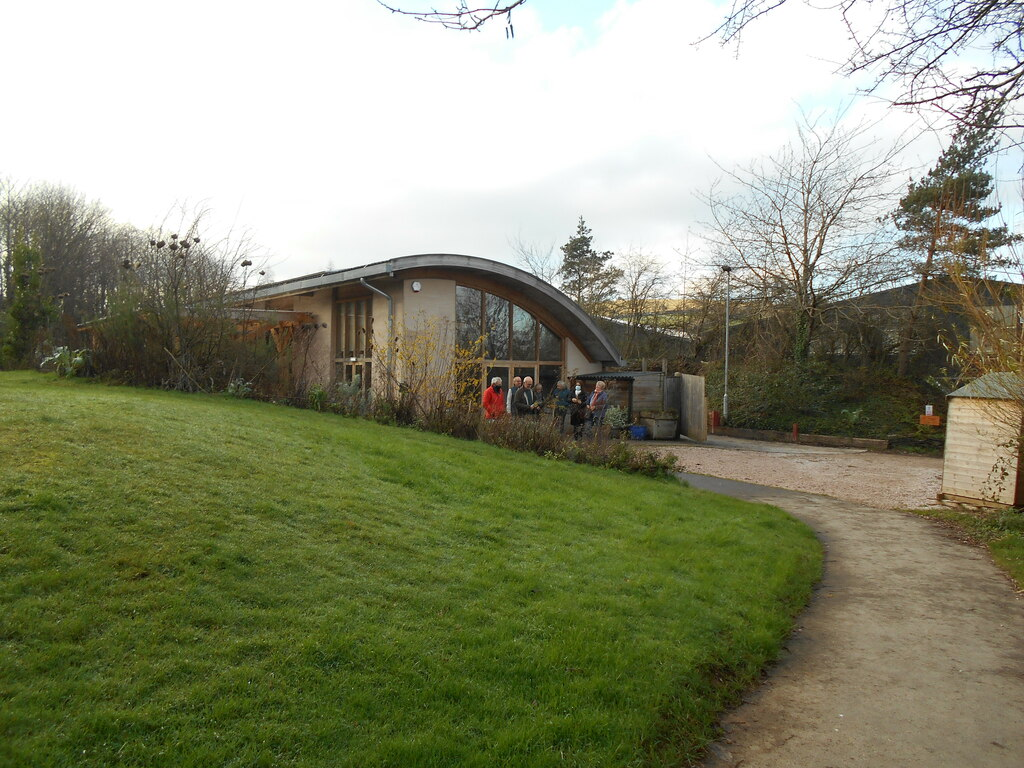
Riverford Field Kitchen restaurant at the company headquarters

In March 2005, before celebrity chef Jamie Oliver's school dinner project, Riverford obtained the catering contract for lunches at a local primary school.

On 2 December 2007 Riverford appeared at number 92 in the Sunday Times Fast Track 100, a list of the 100 fastest growing companies in the UK. In 2009 Riverford won the award for best ethical business at the Observer ethical awards and in 2015 Riverford won the award for the Ethical Product of the Decade Award from the Observer.

in 2016 Riverford Organic Farms rebranded to Riverford Organic Farmers with a refocused objective of placing the growers and vegetables at the heart of the business

In 2018 Singh-Watson gave 76% of ownership to an employee owned trust.

In 2020, Riverford Organic Farmers teamed up with bicycle courier company Pedal & Post to have their fresh fruit and vegetables delivered directly to the doors of customers. Amid the COVID-19 pandemic, the delivery services being offered by Riverford Organic Farmers were said to have experienced 'unprecedented demand' for their fresh food.

In May 2023, Riverford announced it will become 100% owned by staff, this came after founder Guy Singh-Watson announced he will be selling the remaining 23% of his shares for around £10 million. Watson stated that he will still be involved in the organisation.
