= Vegetable box scheme =

Type of community-oriented food distribution system

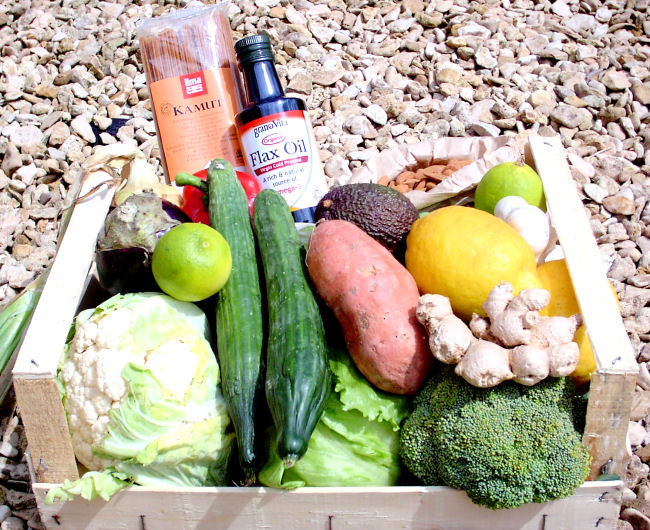
A vegetable box

A vegetable box scheme is an operation that delivers fresh fruit and vegetables, often locally grown and organic, either directly to the customer or to a local collection point. Typically the produce is sold as an ongoing weekly subscription and the offering may vary week to week depending on what is in season.

== Background ==
Some of the organic veg box schemes in the UK were created by growers such as Guy Watson and Charles Dowding. These schemes are usually operated by the grower or a small co-operative. By early 2007, according to the Soil Association, retail sales via such schemes were in excess of £100 million per annum.

Many schemes are run on a local or regional basis, delivering food direct from the producer to the consumer. Other schemes offer a nationwide delivery, with produce supplied by a network of growers, co-operatives and wholesalers negating the local food affiliation of these schemes. Some British supermarkets have also begun offering vegetable boxes.

A box scheme often works by subscription. A customer signs up to a weekly or fortnightly delivery of fresh vegetables and/or fruit. The contents will vary week to week as selected by the box scheme provider on the basis of seasonality and availability. Some schemes offer the option of purchasing extra goods to be delivered along with the vegetable box, such as dairy produce and meat.

== See also ==
- Alternative purchase network
- Community-supported agriculture
