= Norwich Crag Formation =

Geological formation in south-east England

- Stratigraphic range: Early Pleistocene; ~2.4–1.8 Ma
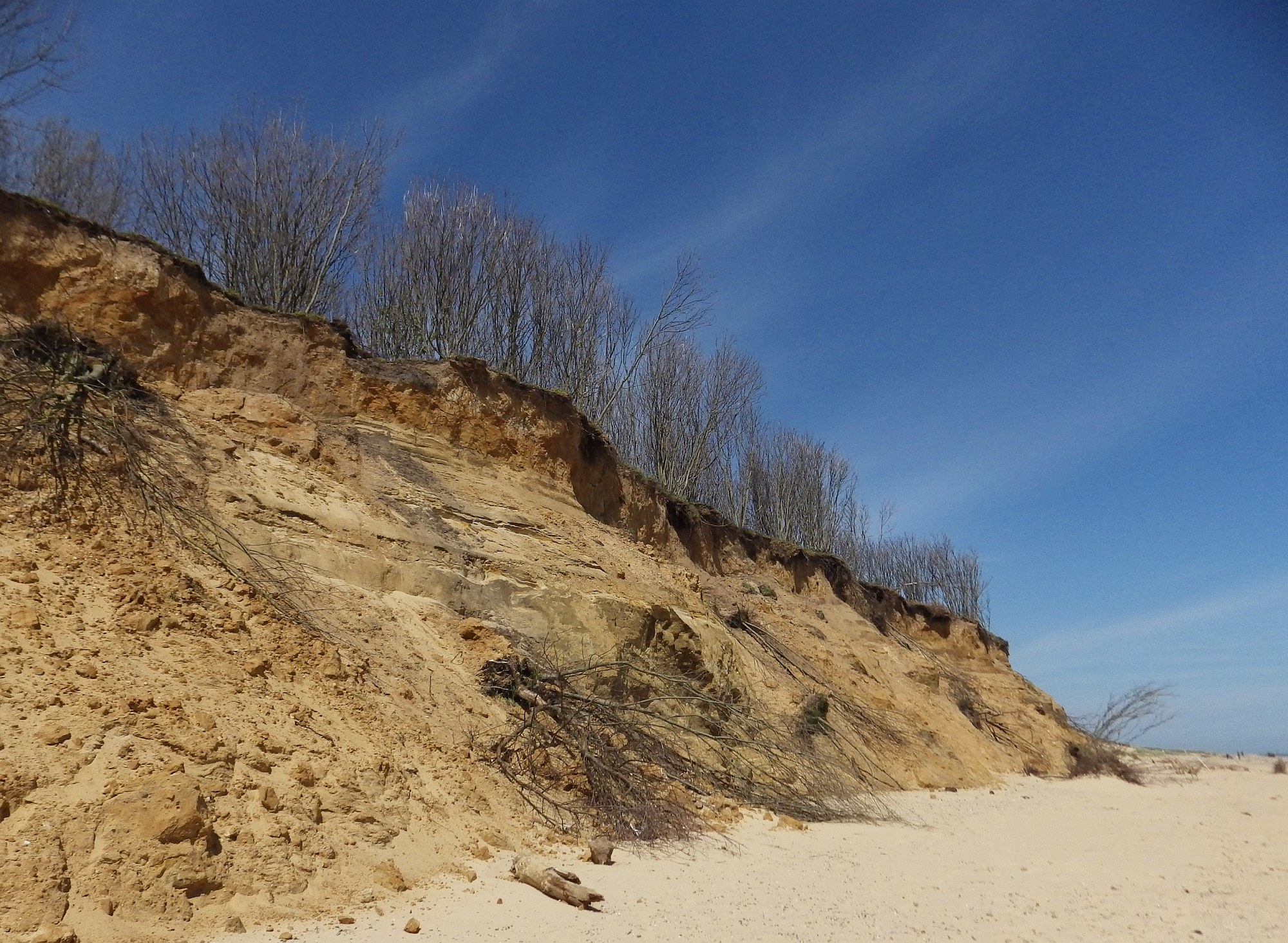
- Easton Wood cliffs, Covehithe, Suffolk
- Type: Geological formation
- Unit of: Crag Group
- Sub-units: Chillesford Sand member, Chillesford Clay Member, Easton Bavents Clay Member, Westleton Beds Member, Sidestrand Member
- Underlies: Wroxham Crag Formation, Kesgrave Catchment Subgroup, Mid Pleistocene glacigenic deposits
- Overlies: Red Crag Formation, Coralline Crag Formation
- Thickness: about 70 metres

Lithology
- Primary: Sand
- Other: Gravel, clay, silt

Location
- Region: East Anglia
- Country: United Kingdom

Type section
- Named for: Bramerton, Norwich
- Named by: Clement Reid
- Year defined: 1890
- Coordinates: 52.2147°N 1.4160°E

The Norwich Crag Formation is a stratigraphic unit of the British Pleistocene Epoch. It is the second youngest unit of the Crag Group, a sequence of four geological formations spanning the Pliocene to Lower Pleistocene transition in East Anglia. It was deposited between approximately 2.4 and 1.8 million years ago, during the Gelasian Stage.

The Norwich Crag is a marginal facies of the thicker, much better developed sedimentary sequence in the southern North Sea basin. It outcrops in the eastern half of the counties of Norfolk and Suffolk, and is also represented in Essex and Hertfordshire. It was deposited in a near-shore environment, and comprises a range of sands, silty clays and flint-rich gravels representing various transgressive and regressive marine episodes. It rests in some places on the Red Crag Formation and in others unconformably on Coralline Crag, Palaeogene formations and Chalk Group bedrock. It is overlain by the Wroxham Crag Formation, and unconformably by the Kesgrave Catchment Subgroup (part of the Dunwich Group) and various Mid Pleistocene glacigenic deposits.

Norwich Crag fossil fauna and flora have been studied since the 19th century for information about environmental conditions during the early Pleistocene. They provide evidence for a general climatic cooling trend from the Pliocene to the Pleistocene.

== History of research ==
The term Crag was first used in a geological sense by R.C. Taylor in 1823, a word commonly used in Suffolk to designate a deposit of fossil sea shells or any shelly sand or gravel.

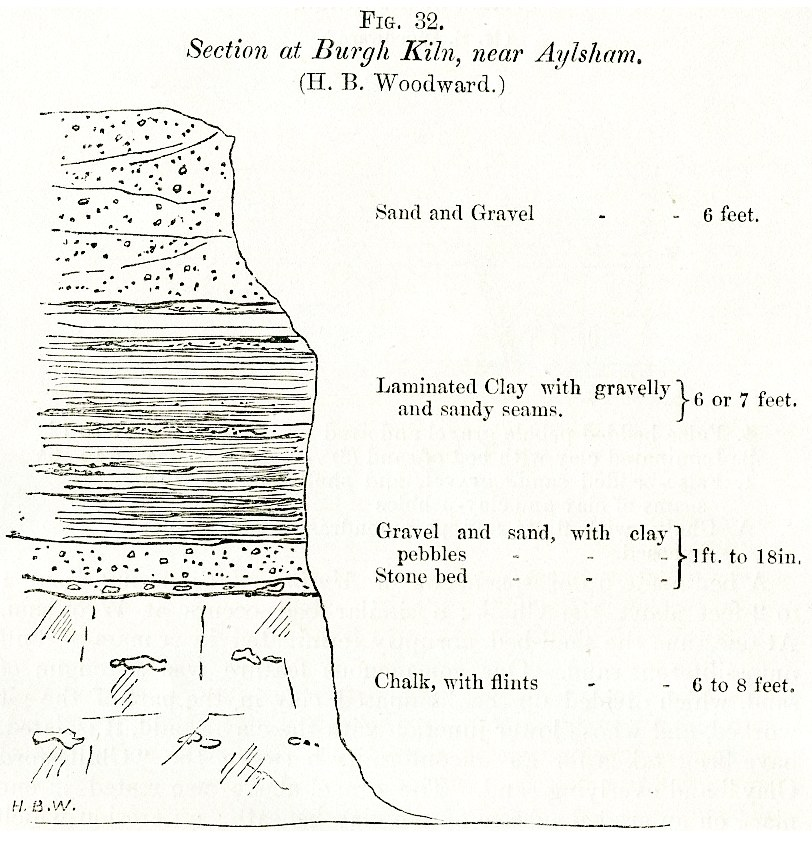
Geological section at Burgh Kiln quarry, Norfolk (Reid 1890).

The Norwich Crag was first identified in the early 19th century as a predominantly marine geological formation, then thought to be of Pliocene age, outcropping from Aldeburgh to the valley of the River Bure. It was variously termed the Mammaliferous Crag (Charlesworth 1836), Norwich Crag (Lyell 1839), Norfolk Crag (Phillips 1863) and Upper Crag (Godwin-Austen 1868). Five horizons were initially recognised: the Mammaliferous Stone-Bed; the Fluvio-marine Crag; the Chillesford Crag; the Chillesford Clay; the Bure Valley Crag, including the Westleton Beds. Additional units were identified in the Norwich Crag Series, the Weybourne Crag and the Bure Valley Beds. This stratigraphy was later formalised by FW Harmer, who grouped them all into an Icenian faunal zone of the Pliocene. Research into sediments from the Ludham research borehole (1959) allowed a sequence of vegetational and faunal episodes to be recognised in the Norwich Crag, based on fossil foraminifera, pollen and mollusca. A revised lithostratigraphical and biostratigraphical framework was published by Funnell and West (1977). Research into the lithostratigraphy of the Norwich Crag was carried out by the British Geological Survey between 1975 and 2006 as part of work to remap the geology of Norfolk and Suffolk; new techniques allowed improved understanding of local detail, and it became possible to distinguish the Norwich Crag from the succeeding Wroxham Crag (now subsuming the Weybourne Crag and Bure Valley Beds). Following international revisions to the Pliocene/Pleistocene boundary, the Norwich Crag is now placed in the Lower Pleistocene.

Six lithostratigraphic members were recognised by the Geological Society of London: the Chillesford Church Member (a basal deposit of marine sand, formerly the Chillesford Sand Member); the Chillesford Member (micaceous, silty clays overlying the Church Member, formerly the Chillesford Clay Member); the Creeting Member (micaceous, inter-tidal sands); the College Farm Member (silty clay of mud flats associated with the Creeting Member); the Easton Bavents Member (clay with sand laminae); the Westleton Member (flint-rich gravels overlying the Easton Bavents Member).

The type site of the Formation is at Bramerton Pits SSSI, near Norwich.

== The sedimentary record ==
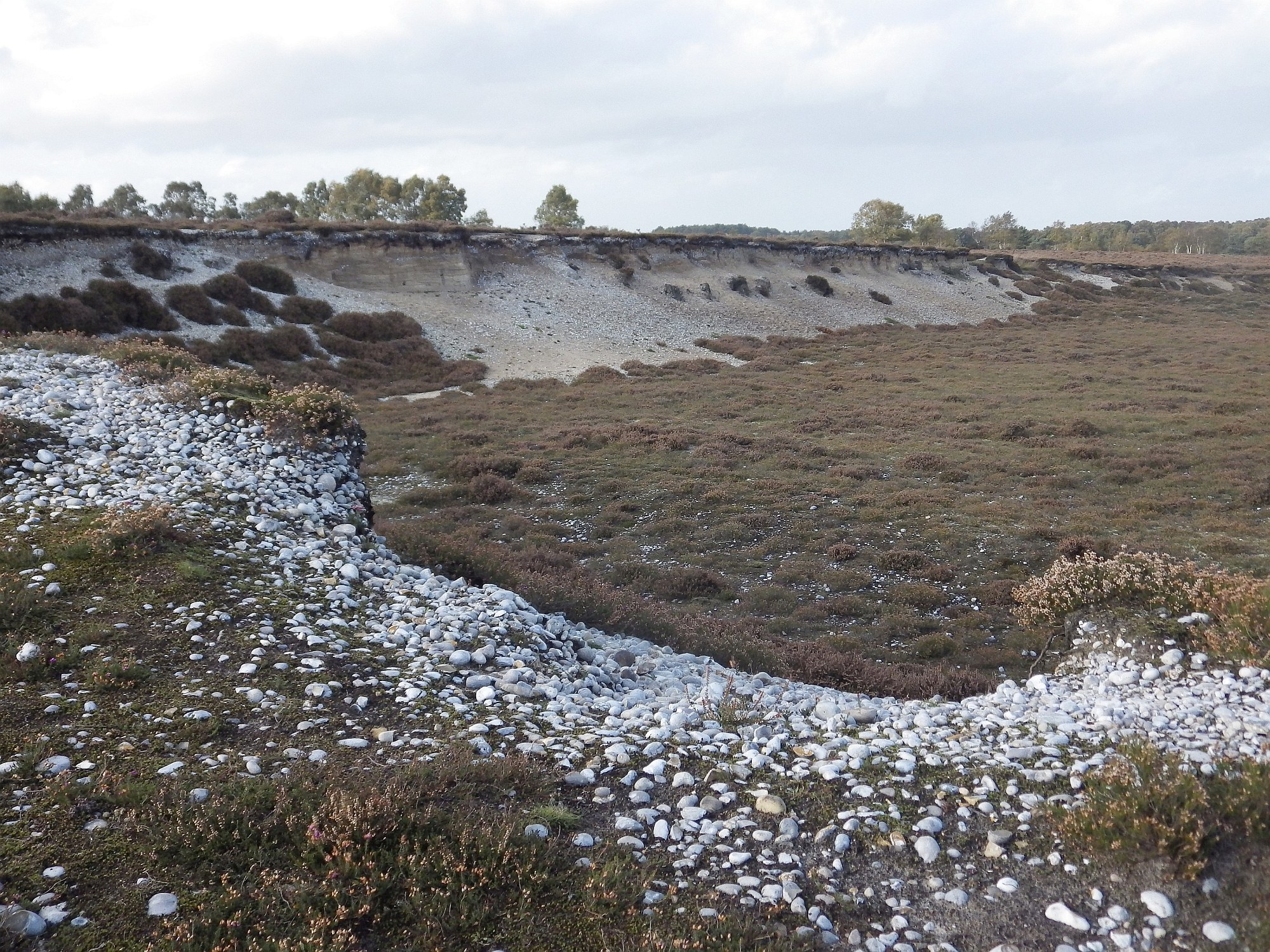
Flint gravels of the Westleton Member exposed in an old quarry on Westleton Heath, Suffolk, UK; thought to have been largely deposited in tidal inlets younger than the Baventian cold stage.

The Norwich Crag Formation is a marginal facies of the thicker, much better developed sedimentary sequence in the southern North Sea basin. It outcrops in the eastern half of the counties of Norfolk and Suffolk, and is also represented in Essex and Hertfordshire. Geological field relationships show that it rests with discontinuity on the Red Crag Formation and oversteps in other places onto the Coralline Crag, the Palaeogene formations and Chalk Group bedrock. It is overlain disconformably by the Wroxham Crag Formation, and unconformably by the Kesgrave Catchment Subgroup and Mid Pleistocene glacigenic deposits.

The Norwich Crag comprises a widespread sheet of well sorted, fine- to medium-grained micaceous, glauconitic, locally shelly sands (e.g. the Chillesford Sand Member), with localized beds of laminated silty clays (particularly the Chillesford Clay and Easton Bavents Clay members) and well sorted fine to medium sands with beds of rounded flint gravels (notably the Westleton Beds Member). The pebbles are predominantly composed of flint, typically more than 95% local material, either chattermarked (beach-abraded) or angular or sub-angular flint; the remaining 5% is typically white vein quartz and white quartzite. The heavy minerals in the sand-sized fraction of the sediment are characterised by high concentrations of garnet, amphibole and epidote, which suggests that the sands originated from eastern (continental) rather than western (British) fluvial sources. The sandy sediments are near-shore marine deposits, with the clay members being estuarine or lagoonal, and the flint gravels are also near-shore marine, interpreted as channel infills, the gravels having been reworked from gravel beach deposits. These deposits represent environments fluctuating between marine transgressive and regressive episodes on the western margins of the North Sea basin. The source of the distinctive flints, which are often rounded in the coarser sizes in the Westleton Beds Member, is as yet to be conclusively determined but it has been argued that the flints were obtained from local rather than distant Chalk . Comparison with better preserved sedimentary sequences of similar age in the Netherlands has shown that the Norwich Crag sequence is highly incomplete. Interpretation is hampered by difficulties with distinguishing major non-sequences from minor, local erosional discontinuities.

For surface mapping purposes, the British Geological Survey has recognised five members: the Chillesford Sand, Chillesford Clay, Easton Bavents Clay, Westleton Beds and Sidestrand Members. The uppermost beds of the Crag Group (formerly the Bure Valley Beds and Weybourne Crag) are now attributed to the Wroxham Crag Formation, based on their high proportion of fluvially-derived, far-travelled lithological components.

The Westleton Member may be regarded as a sedimentologically coherent and a lithologically and stratigraphically consistent unit stretching from central Norfolk to the Suffolk coast. Beds of fine-grained sediment may also serve as marker horizons in the Crag Basin. Considering the lithostratigraphy to include subsurface sediments evidence by borehole, Riches (2012) proposed three major units for the Basin; most recognisable where they are separated by regressive marine marker beds of silty clay, with the uppermost equated with the Chillesford Clay Member.

== Palaeogeography ==
Early Norwich Crag deposition in East Anglia took place within a topographical context established in the late Pliocene: an eastward dipping plain developed on Cretaceous Chalk interrupted by three SSW to NNE trending depressions partly filled with Red Crag sediments. It is conjectured that at c.2.4 million years BP the North Sea coastline lay across east Norfolk and east Suffolk, with a continuation eastwards to Holland; there were local embayments in the areas of Stalham, Bungay and Stradbroke. The North Sea was a bight at this time, with its southern margin defined by the chalk hills of the Weald-Artois anticline where the Strait of Dover is now located. There is evidence for later marine transgression and extension of the sea as far west as the Stansted area of Essex, associated with deposition of the Chillesford Sand Member during a period of high sea levels around two million years ago correlated with the Antian/Bramertonian Stage. This was followed by marine regression during the Baventian/Pre-Pastonian a Stage. Evidence for major rivers, the Bytham and Proto-Thames, draining into the Crag Basin at this time is represented by far-travelled material found in estuarine deposits in eastern Suffolk, the Easton Bavents Clay and Chillesford Clay Members. The coastline shifted north-eastwards to a position in north-east Norfolk by about 1.75 million years BP. This later period is associated with deposition of the Wroxham Crag Formation and marked fluvial input by the Proto-Thames, Bytham River and Ancaster River systems.

== Tectonic context ==
Since its deposition, the Norwich Crag Formation has undergone tectonic uplift and tilting as part of regional processes operating on the margins of the North Sea basin. The Chillesford Sand Member ranges in elevation from c.90 metres above sea level at Widdington, Essex, to its base at c.6 metres below sea level in the Aldeburgh-Sizewell area. There is therefore evidence for regional uplift of over 90 metres in western East Anglia and tilting towards the North Sea over the last two million years. The uplift has, however, been uneven, with little change apparent in north-east Norfolk in the West Runton – Happisburgh area.

Evidence for fluctuations in relative sea level in the Crag Basin during the Plio-Pleistocene have been attributed to a variety of mechanisms including glacio-isostatic adjustments, eustatic changes and basinal response to sedimentary loading.

== Fauna and flora ==
The fossil fauna and flora of the Norwich Crag have been studied since the early 19th century for biostratigraphic and palaeoclimatic interpretation. Taxa used include plants, molluscs, foraminifers, mammals and dinoflagellates. They provide evidence for a general climatic cooling trend from the Pliocene into the Pleistocene. Three biostratigraphic stages have been identified based on fossil pollen assemblages: Thurnian, Antian/Bramertonian and Baventian/Pre-Pastonian a, representing a cold-warm-cold climatic sequence. Comparison with the better preserved sedimentary sequence in the Netherlands and the North Sea suggests it is unlikely that this represents a single climatic cycle but rather a sequence of episodes represented in an incomplete sedimentary record. The historic chronostratigraphic correlations and palaeoenvironmental interpretations based on biostratigraphy (local and continental) have been criticised as poorly defined and unreliable by Riches (2012).

As the Norwich Crag is a marine formation, the majority of fossils found in it are of marine origin; any terrestrial species were originally blown or washed into it from land, or derived from earlier deposits, particularly the Red Crag. Vertebrate fossils tend to be concentrated in the basement bed or in gravel lags. Species of warm and cold substages are represented, sometimes mixed together; this may pose problems for palaeoecological interpretation.

=== Mammals ===
==== Land mammal fauna ====
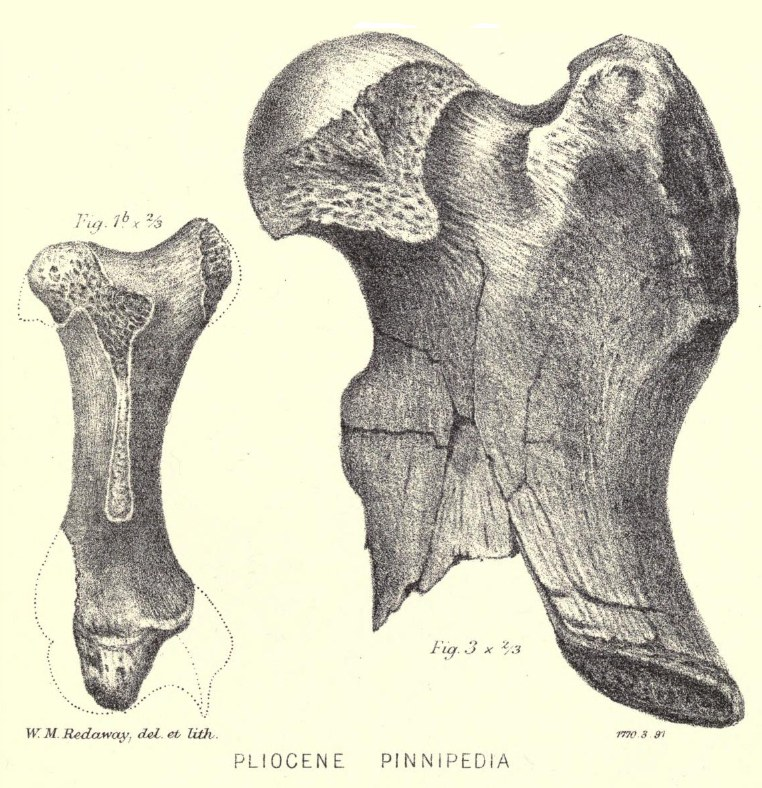
Phoca (seal) humerus & Trichecus (walrus) femur fragments, figured in Newton 1891, plate 2.

From a biostratigraphic point of view, the terrestrial mammal fauna of the Norwich Crag belongs to the Late Villafranchian European Land Mammal Age and is correlated with European Neogene Mammal Zone MN17. The richest and best-preserved assemblage is found in deposits of Antian/Bramertonian age at Easton Wood, Covehithe. Taxa collected from this site include the mammoth Mammuthus meridionalis and the gomphothere Anancus arvernensis, horse Equus robustus, deer Eucladoceros falconeri and Eucladoceros sedgwicki, gazelle Gazella anglica, beaver Trogontherium sp., wolf Canis etruscus, voles Mimomys pliocaenicus, Mimomys reidi and Mimomys tigliensis, and lemming Lemmus kowalskii. Bramerton has yielded holotypes of the extinct otter Enhydra reevei and the gazelle Gazella daviesii. The whole skeleton of a "mastodon" is reported to have been found in the basal Stone Bed resting on Chalk at Horstead in 1820. Other taxa collected from the Norwich Crag Formation includes the large cheetah Acinonyx pardinensis, the equine Equus bressanus, and the primitive moose Cervalces gallicus.

Vole fossils from the Norwich Crag contribute to the ‘vole clock’ used for biostratigraphic zonation of Pliocene and Pleistocene sediments. For instance, Mimomys pliocaenicus is a biozonal species for European Neogene Mammal Zone MN17. Bramerton has yielded the most primitive microtine rodent assemblage known from the British Isles.

==== Marine mammal fauna ====
Marine taxa from Easton Wood include Orca and the walrus Alachatherium cretsii. The short-beaked common dolphin Delphinus delphis and indeterminate whale bones are recorded from Holton and Thorington.

=== Birds ===
Very few avian fossils have been found in the Norwich Crag. Bones of common guillemot, little auk and various indeterminate seabird bones have been recorded from Aldeby, Chillesford, Easton Bavents and Yarn Hill. The albatross Phoebastria anglica has been recorded from Easton Wood, Covehithe.

=== Reptiles and Amphibians ===
No reptile and amphibian fossils have yet been recorded from the Norwich Crag.

=== Fish ===
Fossil marine fish from the Norwich Crag include genera Chrysophrys sp. (a snapper), Acipenser (sturgeon) and Notidanus (a cow shark), and species Platax woodwardi (a batfish), Gadus morhua (Atlantic cod), Rhinoptera woodwardi (a cownose ray) and Raja clavata (thornback ray). Teeth of the freshwater fish Esox lucius (northern pike) have been found at Bramerton.

=== Molluscs ===
Molluscan fossils are abundant at certain horizons in the Norwich Crag. Historically, they have been used to construct palaeontological zonal schemes and to infer palaeoclimatic changes. However they show evidence of considerable transportation, and consequent mixing of faunal assemblages from the earlier Red Crag Formation. The use of molluscan fossils for climatic reconstruction has proved problematic. For instance species found together at several levels in the Ludham borehole notably Serripes groenlandicus (Greenland cockle) and Calyptraea chinensis (Chinese hat snail) have notably different climatic tolerances today (arctic and lusitanic respectively). The presence of mixed arctic, boreal and lusitanic faunal elements at certain levels in the Ludham borehole give no indications of the climatic fluctuations evident from foraminiferal evidence. The local variability of molluscan assemblages at similar horizons was noted by Reid as adding uncertainty to their use for biostratigraphic correlation. However, molluscan fossils have proved most useful as indicators of water depth in marine facies. Molluscan assemblages identified from Norwich Crag deposits represent a range of environments (inner sublittoral; open coast; tidal flat wadden; offshore sublittoral) and climatic conditions (boreal; low arctic; temperate). Cold climate indicator species include Astarte borealis and Yoldia myalis from Baventian deposits at Covehithe. Some species have distinct biostratigraphic value. The absence of Macoma balthica is considered to be an indicator distinguishing Norwich Crag molluscan assemblages from those of the later Wroxham Crag. Fossil shells are scarce or absent in some horizons, which may be due to contemporaneous erosion or non-deposition or post-depositional calcium carbonate solution.

=== Plants ===
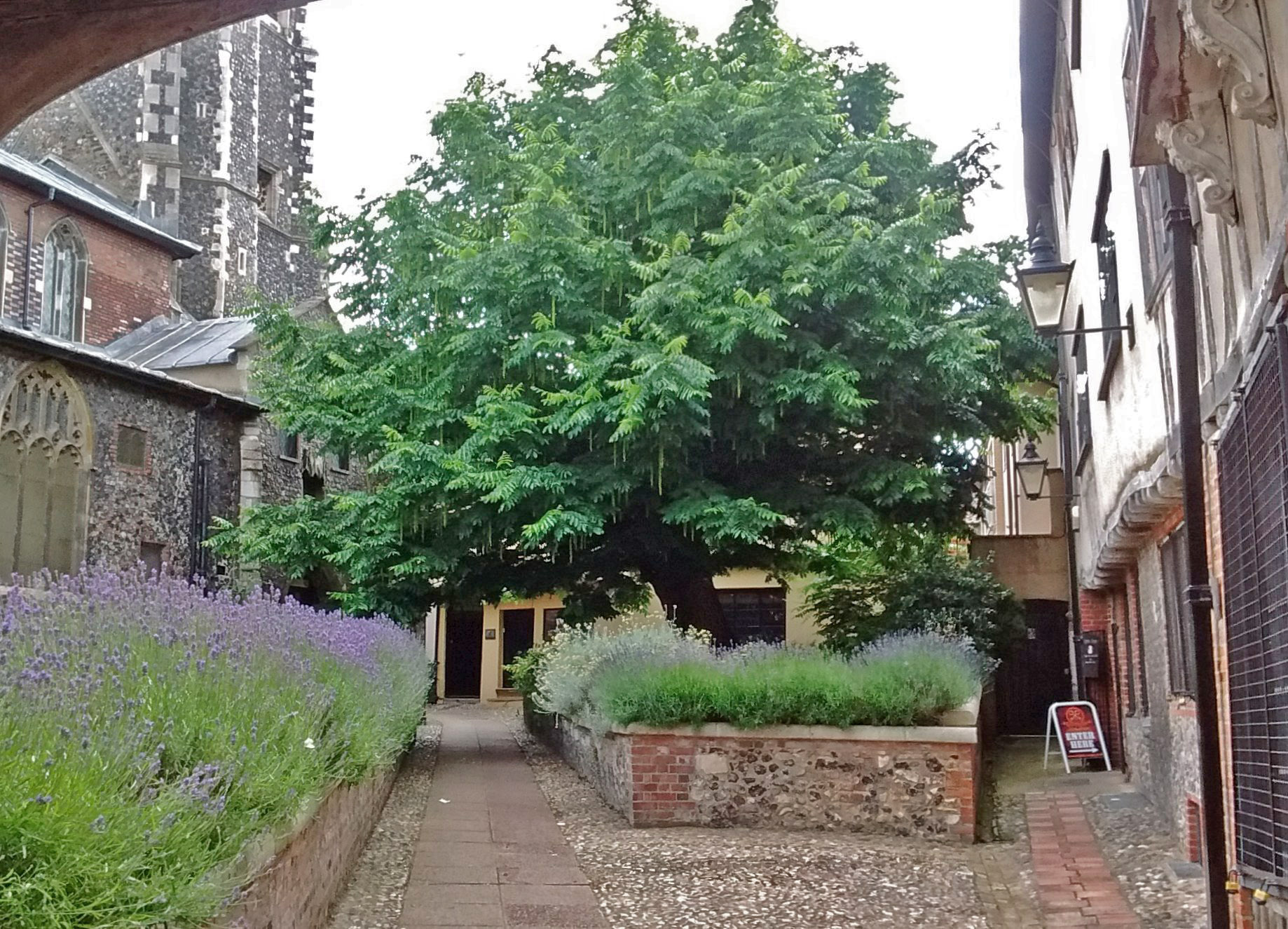
A specimen of Pterocarya fraxinifolia (Caucasian wingnut) in St George's churchyard, Tombland, Norwich – a species native to the area 2 million years ago.

The most complete fossil record of plant life in the Norwich Crag is provided by evidence from the Ludham research borehole. Pollen analysis in association with foraminiferan evidence allowed the identification of pollen assemblage biozones and consequent designation of five biostratigraphic stages, of which three (Thurnian, Antian and Baventian) are correlated with the Norwich Crag. The Thurnian was identified as a glacial stage with an oceanic heath type of vegetation; the Antian with temperate mixed coniferous / deciduous forest including Tsuga (hemlock) and Pterocarya (wingnut); the Baventian, a glacial stage more severe than the Thurnian, with the return of oceanic heath. Further work on Norwich Crag sediments at Bramerton, Norfolk, allowed a Bramertonian stage to be identified, characterised by temperate forest with Quercus, Carpinus and Alnus. Correlation was made with the pollen assemblage from Chillesford. Specimens of fossil wood have occasionally been found, for example pyritised pine and oak at Holton.

=== Dinoflagellates ===
Dinoflagellate fossil assemblages have been used in the Norwich Crag as indicators of palaeoclimatic conditions, although evidence for reworking of earlier dinocysts suggests caution in interpretation.

=== Foraminifers ===
Fossil foraminifera provide important evidence for climatic and environmental interpretation and stratigraphic correlation in the Norwich Crag. The Ludham borehole has provided the most complete foraminiferal record, and has allowed the designation of seven biozones. Further biozones were identified at Bramerton and Easton Bavents, and assemblages identified at a number of other Norwich Crag sites, permitting correlation with the more complete sequence in the Netherlands.

== Dating and correlations ==
The Norwich Crag Formation was deposited during the Gelasian Stage of the Pleistocene, between about 2.4 and 1.8 million years ago. The evidence from fossil plants, mammals, molluscs, foraminifers and dinoflagellates has been used to make biostratigraphic correlations between chronostratigraphic Stages recognised in East Anglia and the more complete sequence on the Continent. Wider correlation is made with Marine Isotope Stages (MIS) and magnetostratigraphy, despite uncertainties in interpretation. It has been noted by Riches (2012) that pollen and foraminiferan assemblages are not age diagnostic, and may not alone be sufficient to sustain reliable stratigraphy. The Thurnian Stage has been variously correlated with Stage Tiglian A or Tiglian B in the Netherlands; the Antian/Bramertonian with Tiglian C1-3 or C1-4b; the Baventian/Pre-Pastonian a with Tiglian C1-4b or C-4c. This timespan is correlated with MIS 81 to 68 or MIS 95 to 71, covering a time period of between 2.44 and 1.8 million years before present in the Matuyama Chron, corresponding to the magnetostratigraphic interval between the Reunion Sub-chron and the top of the Olduvai Sub-chron.

== Eoliths and early humans ==
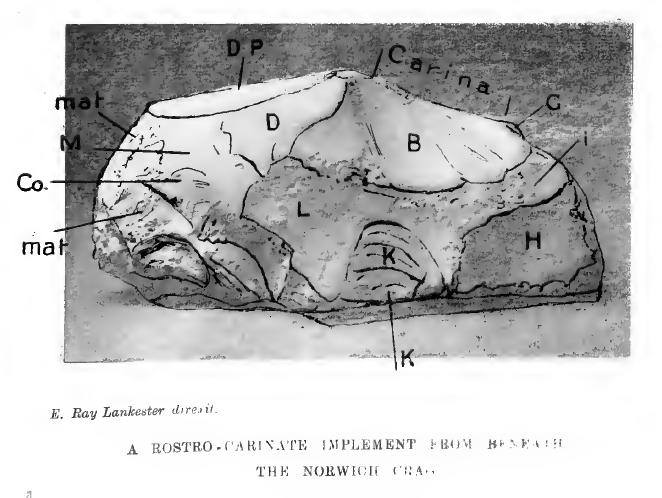
An annotated picture of the Norwich Test Specimen, figured in Lankester (1914), Plate 3.

The discovery of chipped and flaked flints in the Norwich Crag and Red Crag basement beds in the late 19th and early 20th centuries was claimed as evidence for some of the earliest human settlement in Britain. A typologically diagnostic form of 'eolithic' beak-shaped instrument was proposed by E Ray Lankester, the ‘rostro-carinate’, based upon a ‘Norwich Test Specimen’ flint found in the basal Norwich Crag at Colman's Pit, Whitlingham. The human origin for these Crag specimens was refuted by FN Haward on the basis of a systematic analysis of flint fracture patterns and geological context. The fractures were identified by Warren (1923) as caused by sub-soil pressure flaking.

== See also ==
- Geology of England
- Geology of the North Sea
- Ludham Borehole
