= Ludham Borehole =

Geological borehole

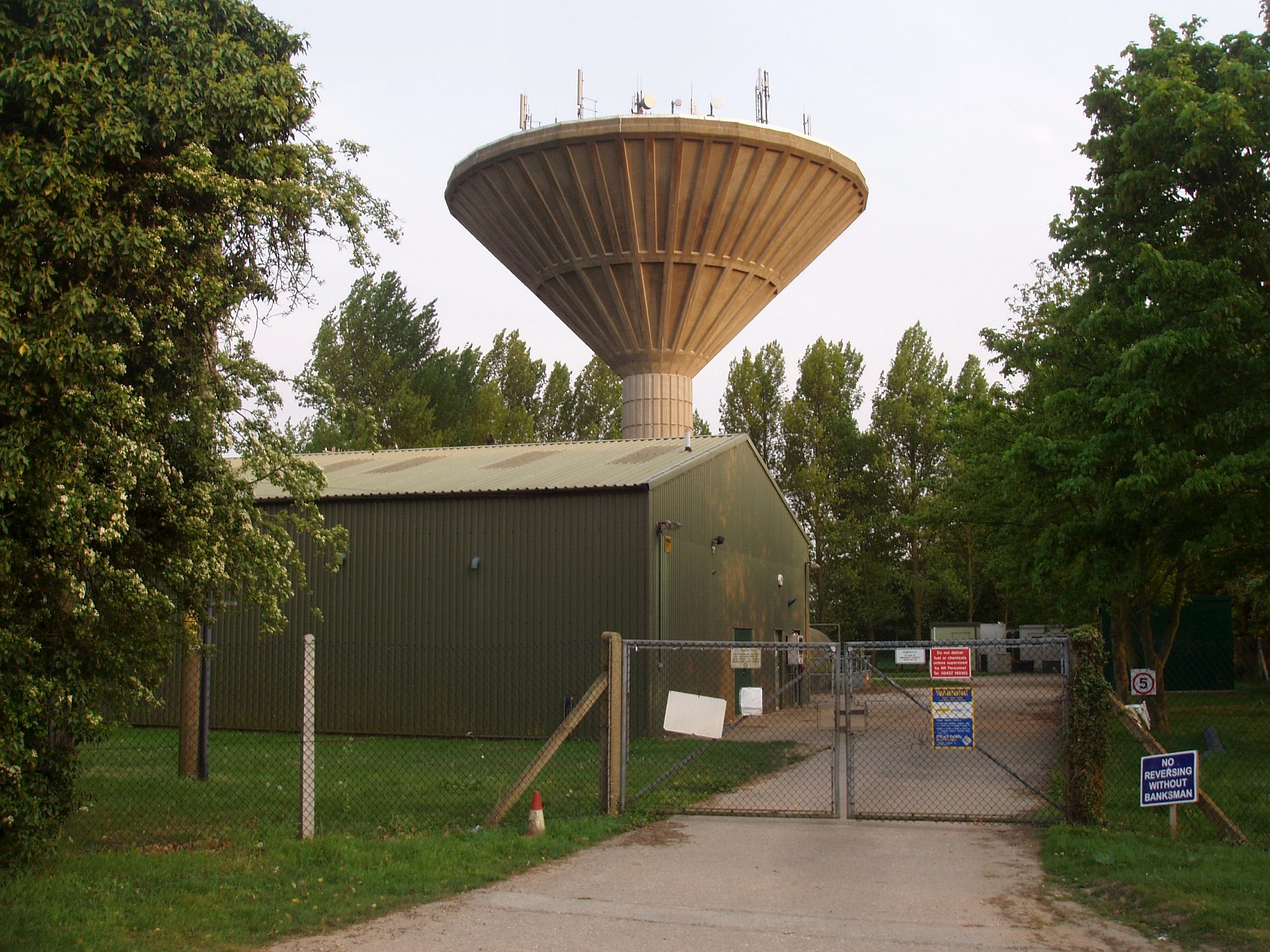
Ludham waterworks, Catfield, Norfolk, 2012. The Ludham Borehole was located on this site.

The Ludham Borehole was a geological research borehole drilled in 1959 near Ludham, Norfolk, UK. A continuous core sample of late Pliocene and early Pleistocene sediments of the Crag Group was recovered. Analysis allowed biostratigraphic zonal schemes for fossil pollen, foraminifera, mollusca and dinoflagellates to be constructed for horizons of the Red Crag and Norwich Crag Formations, and for these formations to be thus correlated with strata of equivalent age in the North Sea basin and north-west Europe.

== History of investigation ==
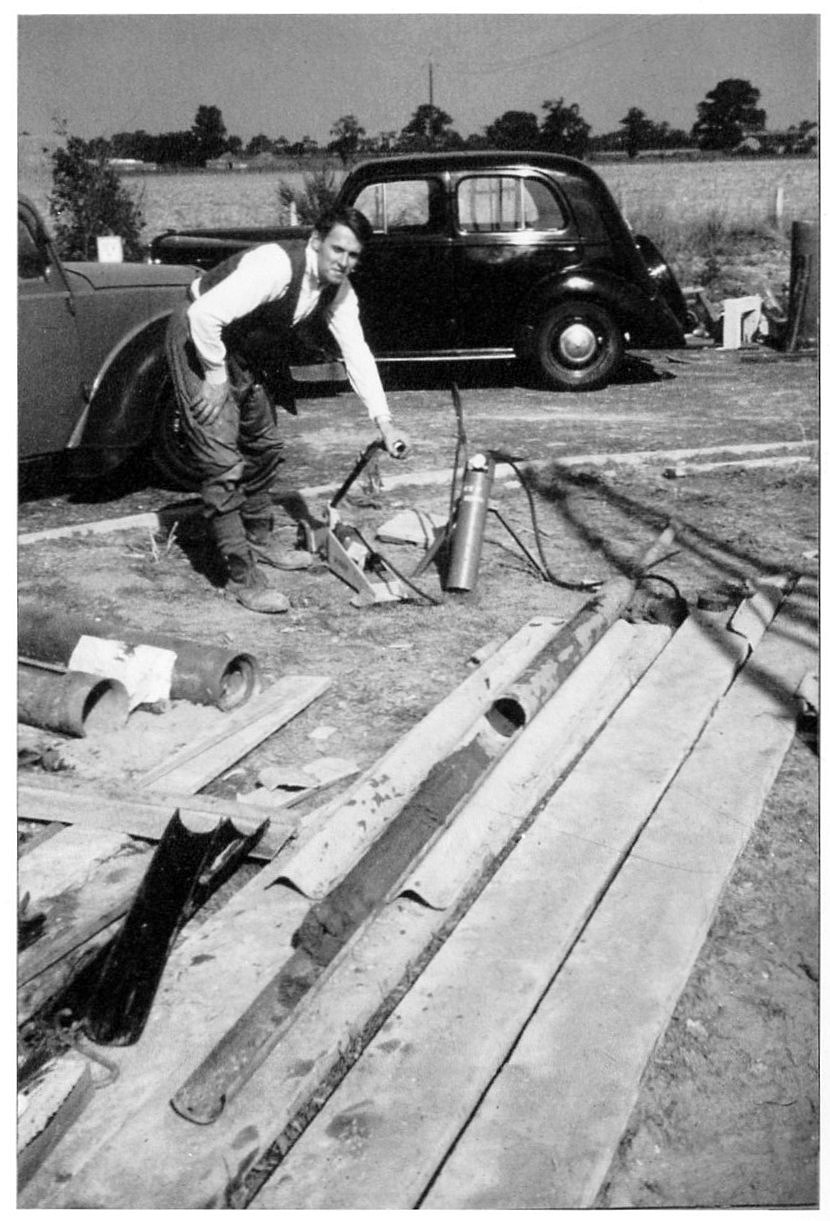
Brian Funnell recovering core samples at the Ludham Borehole site, 1959. Image with kind permission Prof R.G. West.

In 1950 a pilot borehole was put down for exploratory water supply purposes at the Smallburgh Rural District Council waterworks at Wateringpiece Lane, Catfield, near Ludham. Investigation of sediment samples was carried out for fossil foraminiferan content by Brian Funnell and for pollen by Colin Forbes. In 1959 the Royal Society of London financed a research borehole located 80 m to the east. It penetrated Pliocene and Pleistocene deposits of the Crag Group to a depth of 50 m, and found them resting on deposits of the Eocene London Clay Formation. Sediment samples were analysed for their fossil pollen, foraminiferan and molluscan content by Richard West, Brian Funnell and Peter Norton, and later by Martin Head and others for dinoflagellates This research has confirmed the value of the Ludham Borehole for understanding the Pliocene and Pleistocene geology of East Anglia, and for correlation with strata of equivalent age in the North Sea basin and north-west Europe. The findings have since been supplemented by the results from the Ormesby Borehole. The Ludham Borehole is the type site for the Ludhamian Stage which has been correlated with part of the Praetiglian Stage on the continent, and tentatively correlated with the transition of Marine Isotope Stages 97 to 96.

== Stratigraphy ==
The borehole log has been given by West (1962). It was considered that the sedimentary sequence between – 7.6 and –49.7 m depth (grey sands, silts and clays) clearly belonged to the Crag Group. The sequence above this (brown sands with yellow clay seams and ferruginous material) was considered to resemble the uppermost division of Norwich Crag as described by Woodward (1881), attributed to the Bure Valley Beds (now referred to the Wroxham Crag Formation. The geology at this location has been mapped by the British Geological Survey as glacial deposits of the Corton Formation overlying Crag Group (undifferentiated).

== Fauna and flora ==
=== Molluscs ===
Work by Norton (1967) investigated the molluscan fossils from the Ludham Borehole. A sequence of six biostratigraphic assemblage zones was identified, and the results correlated with palaeontological research at this and other sites. It was noted by Norton (1977) that the molluscan fauna gave no indication of the clearly cyclical temperature changes evident from pollen and foraminiferal fossils in the Ludham sequence, and hence it was unreliable for palaeoclimatic interpretation.

=== Plants ===
A sequence of pollen assemblage zones was identified by West (1962), which permitted the designation of five biostratigraphic stages. 1. (the oldest) Ludhamian, with temperate mixed coniferous/deciduous forest including Tsuga and Pterocarya; 2. Thurnian, a glacial stage with an oceanic heath type of vegetation; 3. Antian, with temperate mixed coniferous/deciduous forest including Tsuga and Pterocarya; 4. Baventian, a glacial stage more severe than the Thurnian, with the return of oceanic heaths; 5. An unnamed stage with temperate mixed coniferous/deciduous forest lacking Pterocarya and with only a few traces of Tsuga. These stages were provisionally correlated with Early Pleistocene stages in the Netherlands: the Ludhamian with the Tiglian, the Thurnian with Eburonian, the Antian with Waalian, and the Baventian with Menapian. The unnamed stage was later tentatively correlated with the Pastonian. Further work was later conducted on Ludham pollen samples, yielding evidence for input by British rivers into the Crag sedimentary sequence in the southern North Sea basin.

=== Dinoflagellates ===
Dinoflagellate assemblages were analysed by Wall & Dale (1968), and were found to correspond with five facies associations in the sequence identified by West (1962). More detailed work was later conducted by Head (1996), permitting the identification of over 29 species.

=== Foraminifers ===
A sequence of seven foraminiferal assemblage zones were identified by Funnell (1961) on the basis of research into the Ludham Pilot Boring. Those from the lower part of the sequence were correlated with the Red Crag Formation and from the upper part with the Norwich Crag Formation. The uppermost zone (7) had an arctic-type fauna correlated with the Weybourne Crag (now referred to the Wroxham Crag Formation).

== See also ==
- Geologic time scale
- Geology of England
- Geology of the North Sea
- Norwich Crag Formation
- Palaeontology
- Pleistocene
- Pliocene
- Red Crag Formation
