= Dunwich Group =

Geological formation in England

- Stratigraphic range: Pleistocene
- Type: Group
- Unit of: Great Britain Superficial Deposits Supergroup
- Sub-units: Yarmouth Roads Formation, Cromer Forest Bed, Kesgrave Catchment Subgroup
- Underlies: Albion Glacigenic Group, Britannia Catchments Group, British Coastal Deposits Group
- Overlies: Crag Group
- Thickness: up to 15 m (49 ft)

Lithology
- Primary: fluvial gravels
- Other: sand, clay, silt

Location
- Country: England
- Extent: East Anglia and English Midlands

The Dunwich Group is a Pleistocene lithostratigraphic group (a sequence of rock strata or other definable geological units) present in England north of the upper Thames and, downstream, a line drawn east from near Marlow to Clacton-on-Sea and which encompasses river terrace deposits of the Proto-Thames and other rivers. It unconformably overlies Triassic to Pleistocene bedrock and superficial deposits. In turn, it is often overlain by deposits of the Albion Glacigenic Group and sometimes by those of the Britannia Catchments Group or British Coastal Deposits Group and interfingers in places with those of the Crag Group. No deposits potentially assignable to the group have been identified north of East Anglia or the English Midlands; they are likely to have been destroyed or removed by glacial action.
