= British Coastal Deposits Group =

Quaternary lithostratigraphic group in Great Britain

- Stratigraphic range: Cromerian to Flandrian age
- Type: Group
- Unit of: Great Britain Superficial Deposits Supergroup
- Thickness: up to 80m

Lithology
- Primary: sand
- Other: gravel, silt, clay. peat

Location
- Country: England, Scotland, Wales
- Extent: British Isles (not Ireland)

The British Coastal Deposits Group is a Quaternary lithostratigraphic group (a sequence of rock strata or other definable geological units) present in coastal and estuarine areas around the margins of Great Britain. They are a mix of sands, gravels, silts, clays and peat and, north of a line between the Ribble and Tyne, include glacio-eustatically raised deposits. They lie unconformably on deposits of variously the Britannia Catchments Group (with which they also interfinger), Albion Glacigenic Group, Caledonia Glacigenic Group, Dunwich Group, Crag Group or earlier bedrock. Their upper boundary is the present day ground surface.
