= Bawdsey Cliff =

Protected area in Suffolk, England

Coordinates: 52°N 1.416°E

- Site of Special Scientific Interest
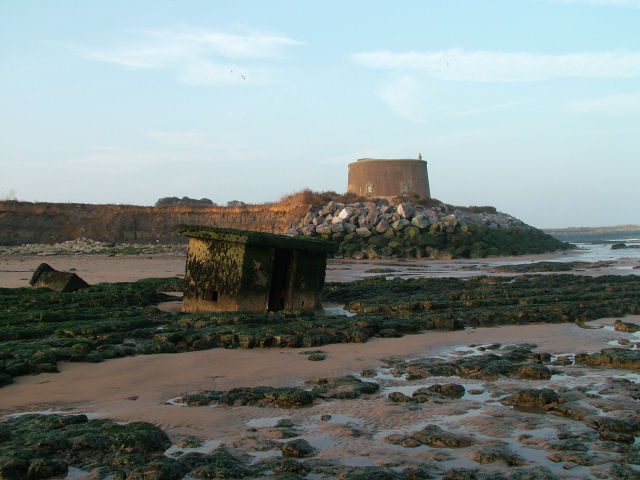
- Location of Bawdsey Cliff.
- Area of search: Suffolk
- Grid reference: TM 346 386
- Interest: Geological
- Area: 17.4 hectares
- Notification date: 1987
- Location map: Magic Map

Bawdsey Cliff is a 17.4-hectare (43-acre) geological Site of Special Scientific Interest north-east of Felixstowe in Suffolk. It is a Geological Conservation Review site, and is in the Suffolk Coast and Heaths Area of Outstanding Natural Beauty.

This two kilometre long section provides the largest exposure of the Early Pleistocene Red Crag Formation, and it is rich in fossils of marine molluscs. It is described by Natural England as having great potential for the study of non-glacial Pleistocene environments.

The site is in the publicly accessible Bawdsey Beach.
