= Bramerton Pits =

Site of Special Interest in Norfolk, England

Coordinates: 52.603°N 1.389°E

- Site of Special Scientific Interest
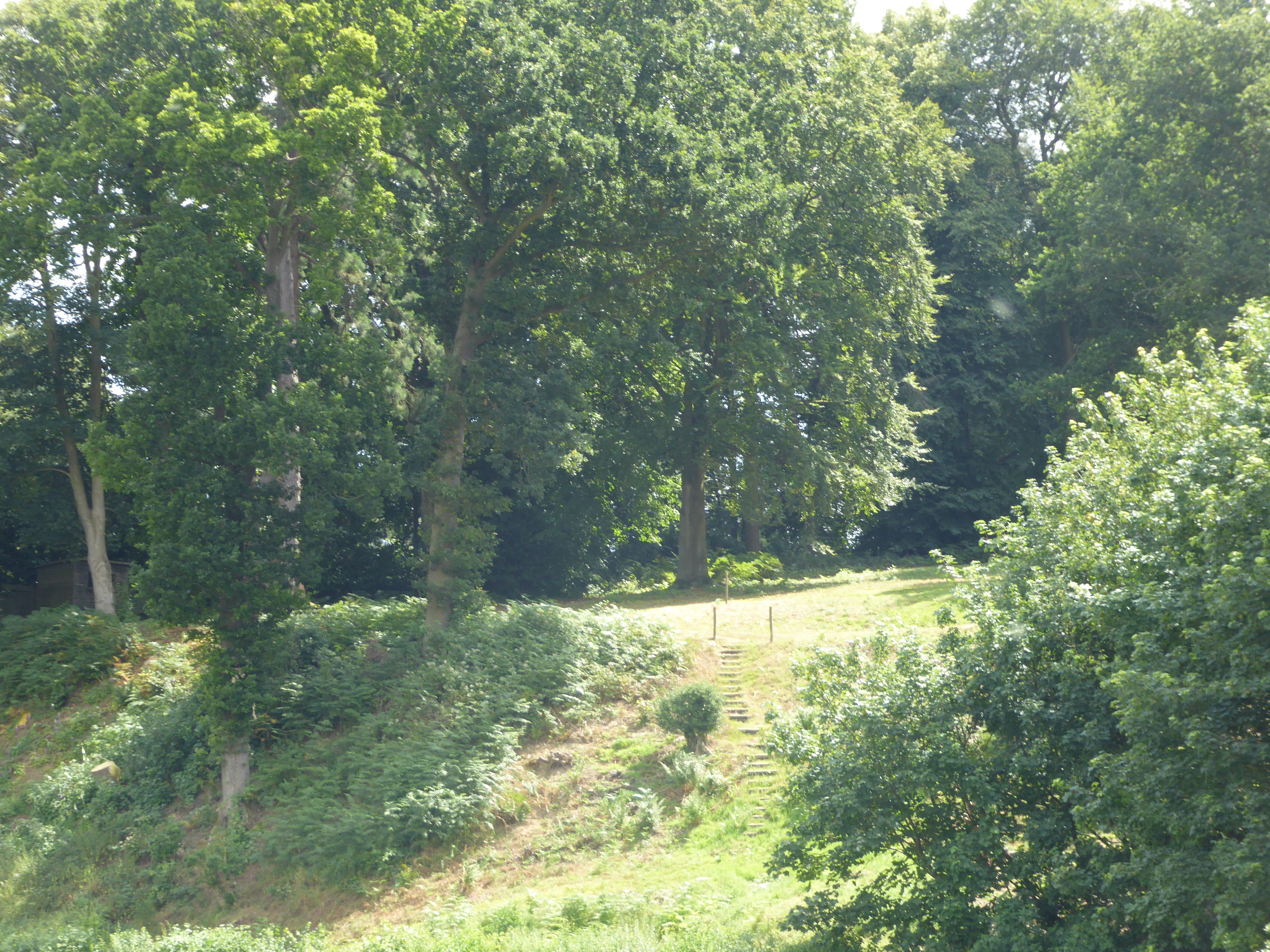
- Location of Bramerton Pits.
- Area of search: Norfolk, England
- Grid reference: TG 296 060
- Interest: Geological
- Area: 0.7 hectares (1.7 acres)
- Notification date: 1985
- Location map: Magic Map

Bramerton Pits is a 0.7-hectare (1.7-acre) geological Site of Special Scientific Interest north of the village of Bramerton in Norfolk, England, on the southern banks of the River Yare. It is a Geological Conservation Review site.

The site is composed of two disused gravel pits which are important for the study of the Lower Pleistocene. Bramerton Common Pit is the type site of the Norwich Crag Formation and Blakes Pit is the type site of the Bramertonian Stage. Both pits have yielded rich, mainly marine vertebrate fossils.

The geological deposits include sands, silts and gravels which have yielded fossils of marine and non-marine mollusca, foraminifera and vertebrates. Studies of fossils from Blake's Pit have demonstrated changes from temperate (Bramertonian) to cold (Pre-Pastonian) climatic conditions. Bramerton Common Pit has yielded a rich fossil vertebrate fauna including marine fishes and extinct species of gomphothere mastodont, otter and vole. Both sites are nationally important for understanding early Pleistocene environments and faunal changes in Britain.

Bramerton Common Pit is adjacent to Bramerton Common near Woods End and Blakes Pit is further east at the end of Hill House Road. There is public access to the site.
