= Billy Bluelight =

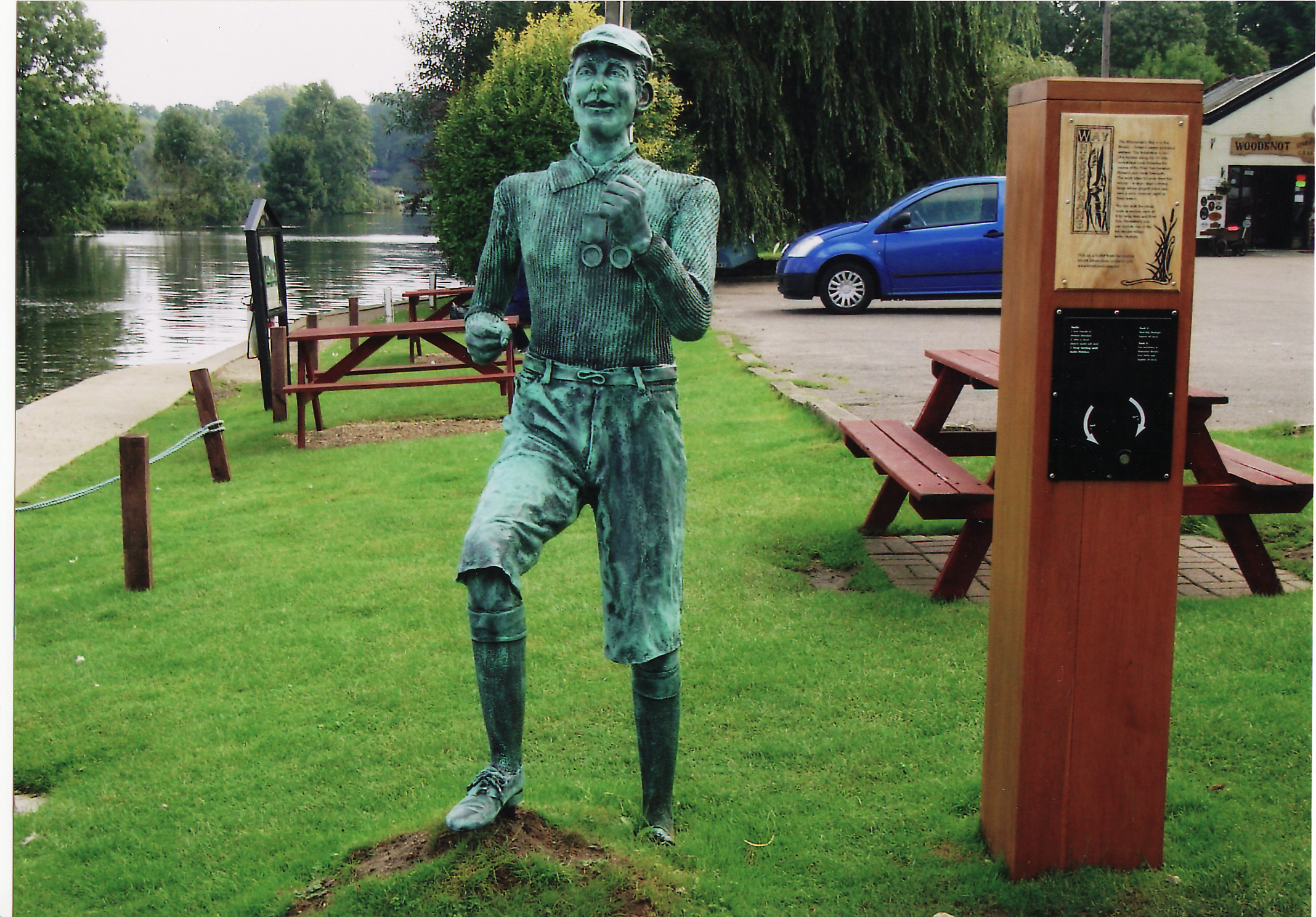
Sculpture of Billy Bluelight on the Wherryman's Way at Bramerton, Norfolk. The River Yare can be seen in background

William Cullum (10 April 1859 – July 1949), known as Billy Bluelight, was a popular English flower vendor and cult figure in Norwich. He was well known for his races, when he would run the 20-mile stretch alongside the steam pleasure boats beside the rivers Wensum and Yare.

== Early life ==
Cullum was born in the slums of his home city of Norwich. He never received a formal education, but he did however teach himself to read. He worked briefly at Caley's chocolate factory and, by 1907, he was already legendary for his racing and street selling activities.

== Later life ==
Cullum never married and lived with his mother, until her death. They lived at several addresses in the city including Oak Street, Colegate and Pykerells House at St Mary's Plain. After his mother's death around 1930 he was reported to have entered Woodlands, part of the West Norwich Hospital.

By 1939, he was living at Palmer Road on the Mile Cross Estate which was built between the wars. In his 80s, he entered the West Norwich Hospital and was later moved to St James Hospital at Shipmeadow, Suffolk, where he died in 1949, aged 90.

Five years after his death, writer R L Potter wrote this description of him:

That over-worked term 'nature's gentleman' was never better exemplified than in the gentle, unpretentious character called Billy Bluelight. It may seem astonishing that a humble little man could imprint his personality so widely on a large city, but it was so.

— R L Potter

== Legacy ==
There are several reminders of him in the Norwich area.

The Crude Apache theatre company produced a play about his life, entitled "Nature's Gentleman - The Story of Billy Bluelight"

Close to the Water's Edge restaurant and bar in Bramerton, a life-size statue has been erected in his memory on the Wherryman's Way long-distance footpath.

In 1994 Woodforde's Brewery renamed their outlet The Freemasons Arms in Hall Road, Norwich to The Billy Bluelight. Since March 2005, and after a change of ownership, the pub has now reverted to its former name.

== Racing career ==
Cullen was slight and wiry, and typically dressed in long white shorts, cricket cap, and plimsolls with medals on his chest. He would issue his challenge to pleasure boat passengers that he would beat them to their destination. Setting off, walking and running, he would be waiting to meet the boats at the next landing stage to receive acclamation and pennies of his admirers. On the return journey he would regale day-trippers with the following rhyme

My name is Billy Bluelight, my age is 45, I hope to get to Carrow Bridge before the boat arrive.

— Billy Bluelight
