= Bramerton =

Village in Norfolk, England

Coordinates: 52.593°N 1.391°E

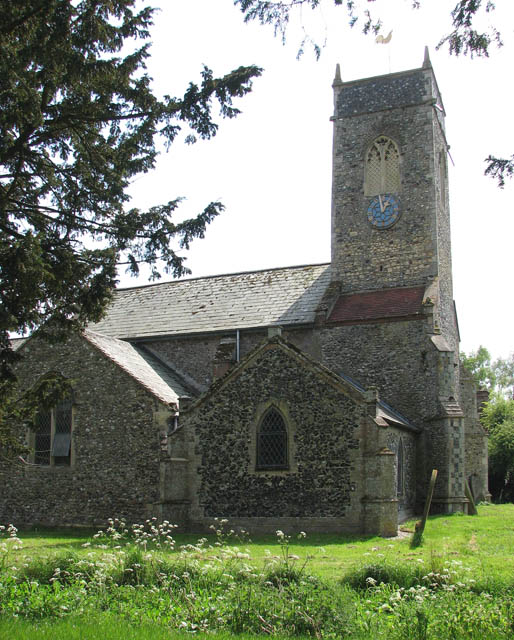
- St. Peter's Church

- Location within Norfolk
- Area: 2.1 km^{2} (0.81 sq mi)
- Population: 323 (2021)
  - Density: 154/km^{2} (400/sq mi)
- OS grid reference: TG2905
- Civil parish: Bramerton
- District: South Norfolk
- Shire county: Norfolk
- Region: East
- Country: England
- Sovereign state: United Kingdom
- Post town: NORWICH
- Postcode district: NR14
- Dialling code: 01508
- Police: Norfolk
- Fire: Norfolk
- Ambulance: East of England
- UK Parliament: South Norfolk

Bramerton is a village and civil parish in the English county of Norfolk. It is 6 miles (9.7 km) north-west of Loddon and 4 miles (6.4 km) south-east of Norwich. The northern part of the parish reaches the River Yare.

== History ==
Bramerton's name is of Anglo-Saxon origin. In the Domesday Book it is recorded as a settlement of 25 households in the hundred of Henstead which was part of the estates of William the Conqueror, Odo of Bayeux, Roger Bigod of Norfolk and Godric the Steward.

Bramerton Hall was built in the 1830s and is Grade II listed.

== Geography ==
According to the 2021 census, Bramerton has a population of 323 people which shows a slight increase from the 301 people recorded in the 2011 census.

The River Yare runs through the north of the parish.

=== Bramerton Pits ===
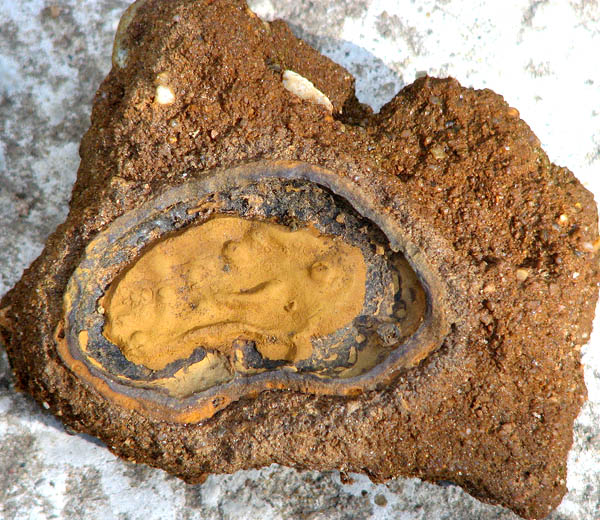
Fossil marine shell found by Bramerton Pits

The rock strata reaching the surface at Bramerton Pits, adjacent to the Common at Woods End, have resulted in the name of the village being given to an early Pleistocene glacial stage in the geological pre-history of the British Isles. The Bramertonian Stage is distinguished by the presence of shelly, sandy deposits indicative of a temperate climate. Bramerton Pits is designated as a Site of Special Scientific Interest and has been excavated on several occasions.

== St. Peter's Church ==
Bramerton's parish church is dedicated to Saint Peter and dates at its earliest from around 1300. The church was significantly remodelled and restored in the 1860s when a memorial window depicting Mary Adelaide Blake was installed by Ward and Hughes.

In the 1920s, a Lychgate for St. Peter's Church was created by John Shingles using oak wood from local trees.

== Amenities ==
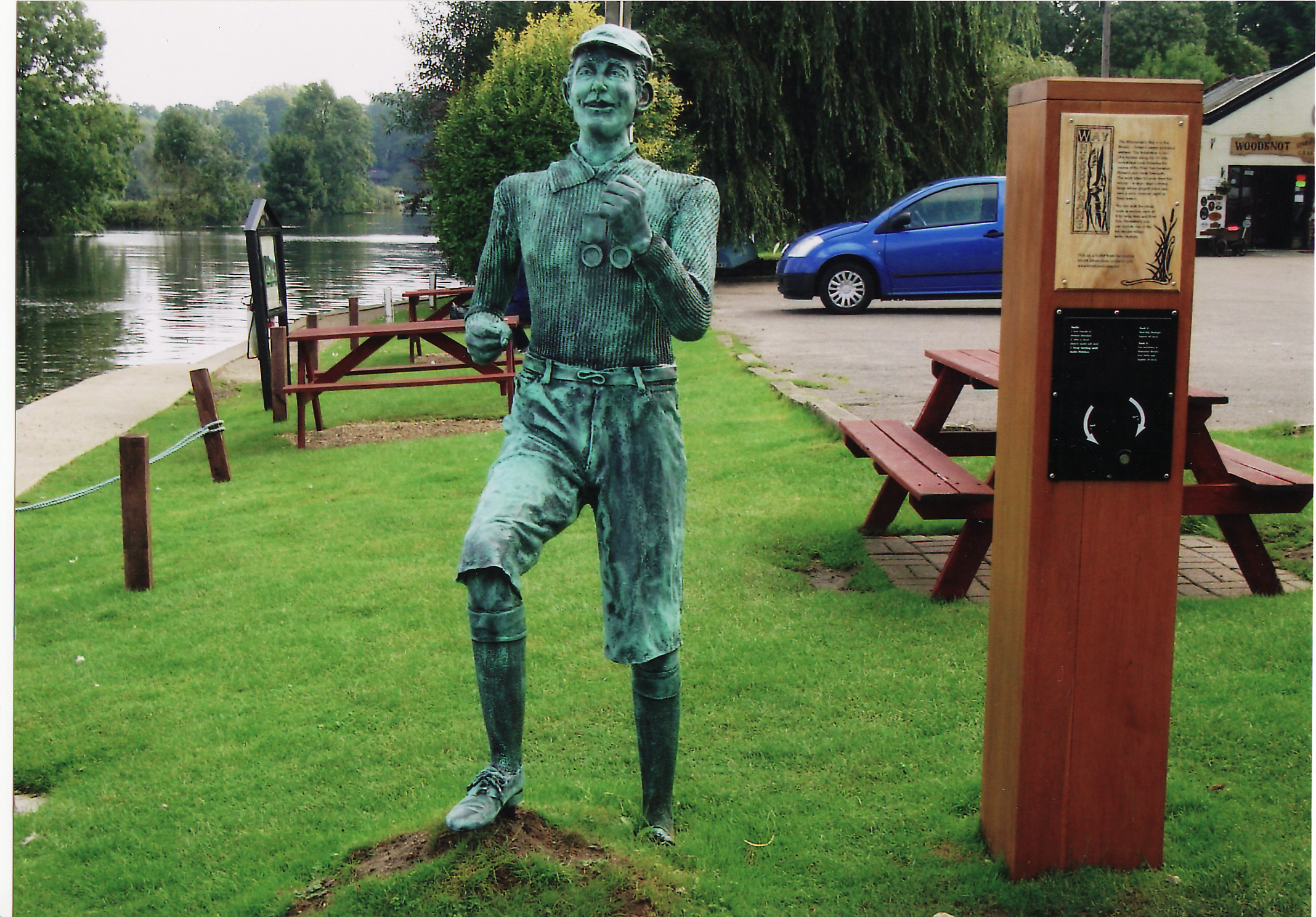
Billy Bluelight on the Wherryman's Way at Woods End PH with the River Yare in background

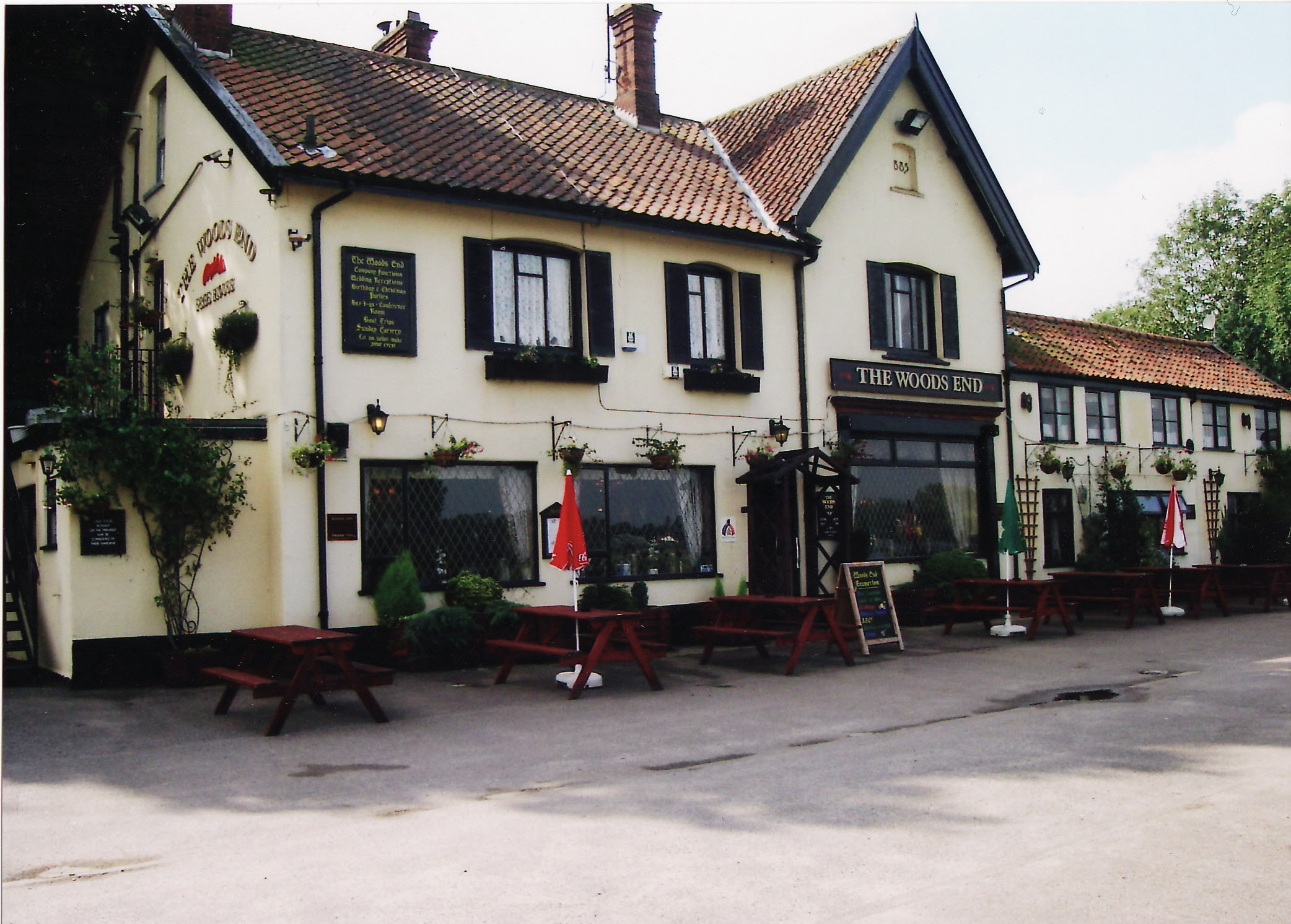
The Woods End Inn

The Water's Edge public house, previously named Woods End, operates on the bank of the River Yare. There has been an inn on the site since before 1700. In 1828 the area and the nearby river were painted by Joseph Stannard, prominent in the Norwich School; entitled Boats on the Yare near Bramerton, Norfolk, his painting is now in the Fitzwilliam Museum in Cambridge. In Victorian times the inn possessed tea rooms and gardens popular with river-borne day-trippers from Norwich.

The area has moorings and is one of the few places on the Norfolk Broads where water skiing is allowed. Outside the pub is a statue of Billy Bluelight by William Cullum. Bluelight used to challenge boat trippers to a race along the riverbank. He is famed for his claim... "My name is Billy Bluelight, my age is 45, I hope to get to Carrow Bridge before the boat arrive." He is said to have remained '45' for many years.

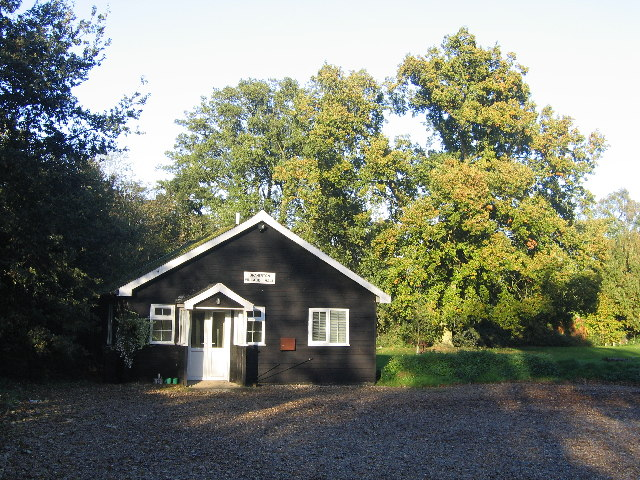
Bramerton Village Hall

Bramerton's post office closed in 1968, the village shop closed in 1977, and the school in 1978. At the north end of the village is a Dawn Christadelphian Hall, first opened in 1952 and extended in the 1960s and again in the 1980s. A secondary hall for youth activities was added in the 2000s. Bramerton and District Bowls Club was founded in 1965, moving to its current location near the village hall in 1972. The village hall was erected by voluntary labour in 1988 and is now the venue for a range of activities. Adjacent to the bowls club is a children's playground.

== Transport ==
Bramerton is served by a bus route operated by Konectbus to Norwich via Kirby Bedon and to the neighbouring villages of Surlingham and Rockland St Mary. National Cycle Route 1 passes through the parish on its route between Norwich and Loddon. The Wherryman's Way, a long distance footpath along the Yare between Norwich and Great Yarmouth, passes through the north of the parish.

== Governance ==
Bramerton is part of the electoral ward of Rockland for local elections and is part of the district of South Norfolk. It is part of the South Norfolk parliamentary constituency.
