= Great Britain Superficial Deposits Supergroup =

Geologic supergroup in Great Britain

- Stratigraphic range: Neogene to Quaternary
- Type: Supergroup
- Sub-units: Albion Glacigenic Group, Britannia Catchments Group, British Coastal Deposits Group, Caledonia Glacigenic Group, Crag Group, Dunwich Group, Residual Deposits Group, Brassington Formation
- Overlies: Neogene or earlier bedrock
- Thickness: up to 200 m (660 ft)

Lithology
- Primary: Till
- Other: Sand, gravel, silt, clay, head, peat etc

Location
- Country: England, Scotland, Wales
- Extent: all natural superficial deposits in Great Britain and the Isle of Man

The Great Britain Superficial Deposits Supergroup is a Neogene to Quaternary lithostratigraphic supergroup (a sequence of rock strata or other definable geological units) present across Great Britain and the Isle of Man. It includes all of the natural superficial deposits found in Great Britain and comprises the Albion Glacigenic Group, Britannia Catchments Group, British Coastal Deposits Group, Caledonia Glacigenic Group, Crag Group, Dunwich Group and Residual Deposits Group. These deposits include till, sands, gravels, silts, head, clay, peat and other materials.
