= Crag Group =

Geological group in south-east England

- Stratigraphic range: Plio-Pleistocene; ~4.4–0.78 Ma
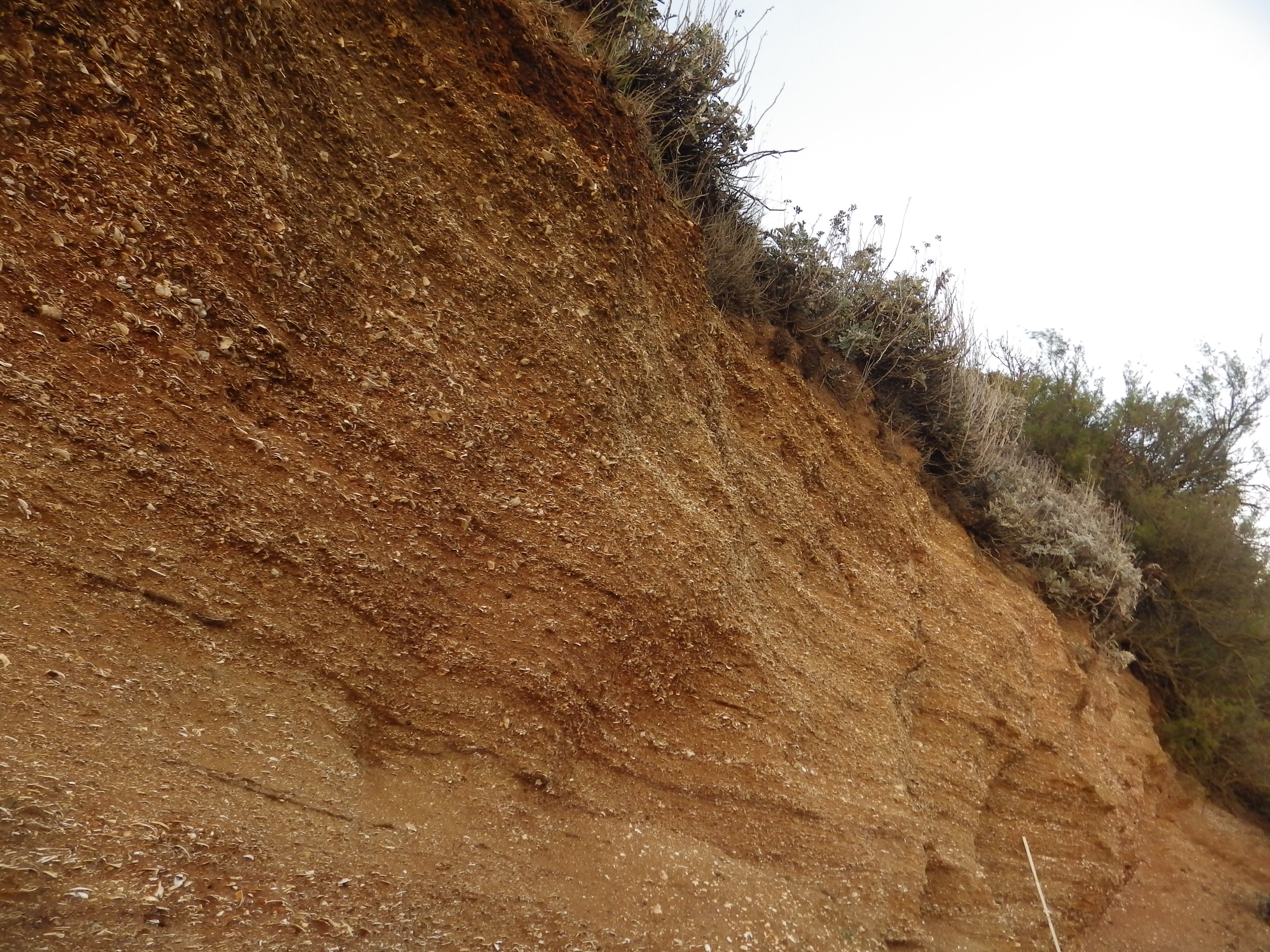
- Red Crag Formation at Bawdsey cliff, Suffolk
- Type: Geologic group
- Unit of: Great Britain Superficial Deposits Supergroup
- Sub-units: Coralline, Red, Norwich & Wroxham Crag Formations
- Underlies: Dunwich, Albion Glacigenic, Britannia Catchments and British Coastal Deposits Groups
- Overlies: Unconformity with Chalk Group and London Clay Formation
- Thickness: Up to 70 m (230 ft) onshore

Lithology
- Primary: Sand
- Other: Gravel, clay, silt, calcarenite

Location
- Region: East Anglia
- Country: England
- Extent: East Anglia and North Sea

Type section
- Named by: R.C. Taylor
- Year defined: 1823

The Crag Group is a geological group outcropping in East Anglia, England and adjacent areas of the North Sea. Its age ranges from approximately 4.4 to 0.478 million years BP, spanning the late Pliocene and early to middle Pleistocene epochs.

== Background ==
The Crag Group comprises a range of marine and estuarine sands, gravels, silts and clays deposited in a relatively shallow-water, tidally-dominated marine embayment on the western margins of the North Sea basin. The sands are characteristically dark green from glauconite but weather bright orange, with haematite 'iron pans' forming. The lithology of the lower part of the Group is almost entirely flint. The highest formation in the Group, the Wroxham Crag, contains over 10% of far-travelled lithologies, notably quartzite and vein quartz from the Midlands, igneous rocks from Wales, and chert from the Upper Greensand of southeastern England. This exotic rock component was introduced by rivers such as the Bytham River and Proto-Thames.

The constituent formations of the Crag Group are the Coralline Crag (mid to late Pliocene); the Red Crag (late Pliocene / early Pleistocene); the Norwich Crag (early Pleistocene) and the Wroxham Crag (early to Middle Pleistocene). The sedimentary record is incomplete, leading to difficulties in correlating and dating sequences.

The Crag Group goes from East Anglia to Hertfordshire in a south-westward formation. It is up to 70 metres thick onshore.

The term Crag was first used in a geological sense by R.C. Taylor in 1823, a word commonly used in Suffolk to designate any shelly sand or gravel.

== See also ==
- List of fossiliferous stratigraphic units in England
