= Residual Deposits Group =

Geologial formation in England, UK

- Stratigraphic range: Palaeogene-Cromerian
- Type: Group
- Unit of: Great Britain Superficial Deposits Supergroup
- Underlies: Quaternary deposits
- Thickness: 2–25 m (6.6–82.0 ft)

Lithology
- Primary: remanié deposits

Location
- Region: England, Scotland
- Country: United Kingdom
- Extent: across Chalk outcrop (southern England), Buchan (northeast Scotland)

The Residual Deposits Group is a Palaeogene to Quaternary lithostratigraphic group (a sequence of rock strata or other definable geological units) present in those parts of southern and eastern England where the Chalk outcrops and in the Buchan district of northeast Scotland. In the former they consist of the 2 to 10 metres (6.6 to 32.8 ft) thick remanié deposit, Clay-with-Flints and in the latter the Buchan Gravels Formation which is up to 25 metres (82 ft) thick.
