= Britannia Catchments Group =

Quaternary lithostratigraphic group in Great Britain

- Stratigraphic range: Cromerian to Flandrian
- Type: Group
- Unit of: Great Britain Superficial Deposits Supergroup
- Sub-units: subgroups by drainage system
- Overlies: Albion Glacigenic Group, the Caledonia Glacigenic Group, Dunwich Group, Crag Group or bedrock
- Thickness: up to 100m

Lithology
- Primary: alluvium
- Other: river terrace deposits, peat, head, cover sand and blown sand

Location
- Country: England, Scotland, Wales
- Extent: throughout Great Britain

The Britannia Catchments Group is a Quaternary lithostratigraphic group (a sequence of rock strata or other definable geological units) present in all parts of Great Britain and including the Isle of Man. It includes a wide range of deposits including alluvium, river terrace deposits, peat, head, cover sand and blown sand of fluvial, lacustrine, mass movement, periglacial and aeolian origin. Its lower boundary is defined as an unconformable contact with the underlying Albion Glacigenic Group (in England and Wales), the Caledonia Glacigenic Group (in Scotland), the Dunwich Group, Crag Group or with older bedrock. Its upper boundary is generally the present day ground surface but it interfingers locally with the British Coastal Deposits Group.

The group is subdivided into more geographically restricted subgroups by river catchments of which the following are defined:

- Northern Highlands and Argyll Catchments Subgroup
- Grampian Catchments Subgroup
- Tay Catchments Subgroup
- Forth Catchments Subgroup
- Clyde Catchments Subgroup
- Tweed Catchments Subgroup
- Solway Catchments Subgroup
- Northumbria Catchments Subgroup
- Isle of Man Catchments Subgroup
- Cheshire-North Wales Catchments Subgroup
- Yorkshire Catchments Subgroup
- Trent Catchments Subgroup
- Severn and Avon Catchments Subgroup
- West Wales Catchments Subgroup
- Ouse-Nene Catchments Subgroup
- Yare Catchments Subgroup
- Somerset Catchments Subgroup
- Thames Catchments Subgroup
- Suffolk Catchments Subgroup
- Cornubian Catchments Subgroup
- Solent Catchments Subgroup
- Sussex Catchments Subgroup
- South Kent Catchments Subgroup

Subgroups may also be defined for the various Scottish island groups.
