= Red Crag Formation =

Geological formation in south-east England

Coordinates: 51°59′58″N 1°25′16″E

- Stratigraphic range: Late Pliocene - Early Pleistocene; ~3.3–2.5 Ma
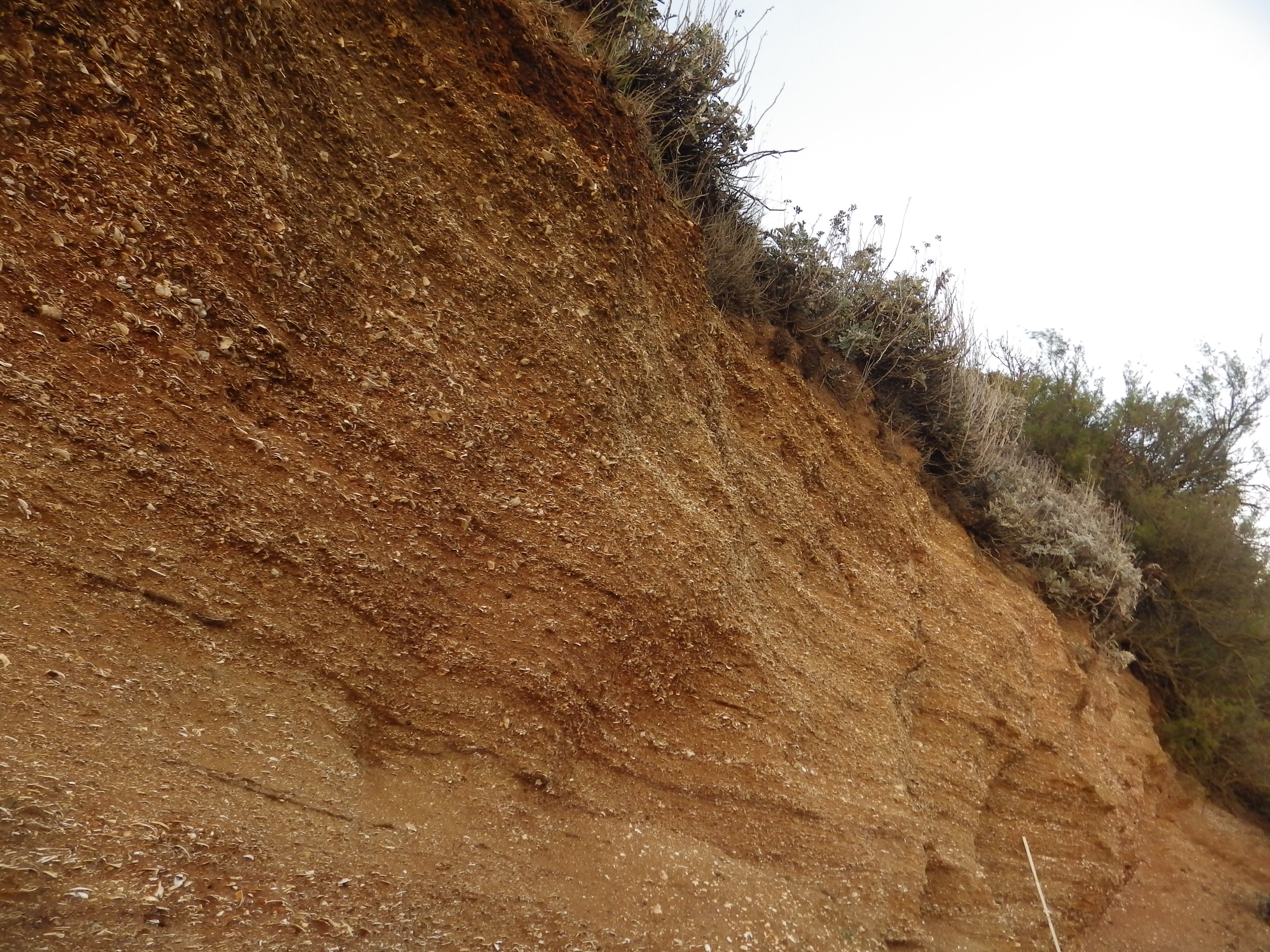
- Red Crag at Bawdsey Cliff in Suffolk
- Type: Geological formation
- Unit of: Crag Group
- Sub-units: Sizewell Member
- Underlies: Norwich Crag Formation
- Overlies: Coralline Crag Formation or London Clay (unconformity)
- Thickness: up to 20 metres (70 ft), locally up to 45 m, offshore up to 70 m

Lithology
- Primary: Sand

Location
- Region: Europe
- Country: England

The Red Crag Formation is a geological formation in England, deposited from the latest Pliocene to the earliest Pleistocene (Gelasian). It outcrops in south-eastern Suffolk and north-eastern Essex. The name derives from its iron-stained reddish colour and crag which is an East Anglian word for shells. It is part of the Crag Group, a series of notably marine strata which belong to a period when Britain was connected to continental Europe by the Weald–Artois Anticline, and the area in which the Crag Group was deposited was a tidally dominated marine bay. This bay would have been subjected to enlargement and contraction brought about by transgressions and regressions driven by the 40,000-year Milankovitch cycles.

The sediment in the outcrops mainly consists of coarse-grained and shelly sands that were deposited in sand waves (megaripples) that migrated parallel to the shore in a south-westward direction. The most common fossils are bivalves and gastropods that were often worn by the abrasive environment. The most extensive exposure is found at Bawdsey Cliff, which is designated a Site of Special Scientific Interest (SSSI); here a width of around 2 kilometres (1.2 miles) of Crag is exposed. At the coastline by Walton-on-the-Naze, remains of megalodon were found.

The Red Crag Formation at depth in eastern Suffolk clearly has one member, the Sizewell Member, a coarse shelly sand with thin beds of clay and silt. It was interpreted as having been deposited in large scale sand waves where the sea bed was deeper. The overlying Thorpeness Member, was provisionally assigned to the Red Crag based on its lithology but there is more evidence to suggest that it is part of the Norwich Crag Formation.

It has been proposed that the Red Crag started in the late Pliocene and to have possibly extended up into the early Pleistocene, but there is disagreement on more precise dating. According to the British Geological Survey, the Red Crag sits within a segment of time from about 3.3 to 2.5 mya. It is considered that the Red Crag at Walton-on-the–Naze is the oldest and that it was deposited in only a few decades at some time between 2.9 and 2.6 mya. This has led to the UK stratigraphic stage name Waltonian, which is usually correlated with the final Pliocene Reuverian Stage in the Netherlands. While the precise age of the formation is uncertain, it is generally suggested that deposition of the formation as a whole spanned around 600–800,000 years. There are difficulties in reconciling how the Red Crag equates with international chronological stages. In particular, the start and end dates are poorly defined due to the general paucity of age-diagnostic stratigraphic indicators and the fragmentary nature of the geology. It can also be difficult to separate the Red Crag from the overlying Norwich Crag Formation.

The base of the formation contains a nodule-rich bed (termed the "Nodule Bed", or "Coprolite Bed") with fossils including terrestrial vertebrates (as well as marine fossils such as those of whales and shark teeth), some of which were reworked from deposits considerably older than the Red Crag Formation itself and often display abrasion and polish indicating reworking. While some of these animals are as old as the Eocene (such as Hyracotherium and Coryphodon, originating from the London Clay), most originate from the Pliocene and late Miocene, at least as early as MN 11–12, around 9-7 million years ago in the case of some species. The presence of monkeys and other thermophilic species implies that during the late Miocene-early Pliocene, the region was probably considerably warmer than today, and had a subtropical climate. During the Late Pliocene, the region is thought to have had a temperate climate. The Red Crag also contains Early Pleistocene fossils of animals similar in age to the formation itself, though terrestrial vertebrate fossils from the rest of the Red Crag are considerably rarer than those from the nodule bed. The phosphatic nodules and bones in the bed were historically during the mid-late 19th century ground up on industrial scales to use as fertilizer.

== Paleobiota ==
=== Mammals ===
==== Proboscidea ====
Genus/species	Locality	Notes	Image
"Mammut" borsoni	Nodule Bed	A member of the family Mammutidae, closely related to the American mastodon (Mammut americanum). One of the largest land mammals ever, originates from Pliocene deposits	Diagram of a "M." borsoni skeleton from Milia, Greece
Anancus arvernensis	Nodule Bed and higher stratigraphic layers	A "tetralophodont gomphothere", related to elephants, dating to the Pliocene-Early Pleistocene	Skeleton of Anancus arvernensis on display in Italy
Mammuthus rumanus		The oldest mammoth species known outside of Africa, dating to the Pliocene	
Mammuthus meridionalis		A large mammoth dating to the Early Pleistocene	A M. meridionalis skeleton on display in France

==== Ungulates ====
Genus/species	Locality	Notes	Image
Proboscidipparion sp.	Nodule Bed	Known from teeth. A three toed equine belonging to the extinct tribe Hipparionini. Suggested to be Pliocene in age. Previously referred to as "Hipparion" crassum. Although previously hipparionine teeth remains from the Red Crag have been attributed to other genera, including Plesiohipparion and Hipparion sensu lato, a 2021 paper suggested that all hipparionine remains from the Red Crag may represent Proboscidipparion.	Skull of the related Proboscidipparion pater from China
Plesiohipparion rocinantis	Nodule Bed	A three toed equine belonging to the extinct tribe Hipparionini. Suggested to be late Pliocene in age	
Equus major		A large equine of Early Pleistocene age	
Stephanorhinus etruscus		A rhinoceros belonging to the extinct genus Stephanorhinus, dating to the Late Pliocene-Early Pleistocene	Skeleton of S. etruscus on display in Switzerland
Tapirus arvernensis	Nodule Bed	An extinct tapir belonging to the genus Tapirus, dating to the Pliocene	Crushed skull on display in Austria
Dasychoerus arvernensis	Nodule Bed	An extinct swine (Suidae) dating to the Late Pliocene (MN zone 16), related to living African giant forest hogs.	
Hippopotamodon sp.	Nodule Bed	A swine (Suidae) either representing the species H. erymanthius or H. major, likely originate from the Late Miocene (MN zone 11-12, around 9-7 million years ago).	Skull of Hippopotamodon major on display in Spain
Parabos sp.		A bovine	
Cervus perrieri	Nodule Bed	A large deer dating to the Pliocene, also known as Praeelaphus perrieri	
Metacervocerus pardinensis	Nodule Bed	A medium sized deer dating to the Pliocene, also referred to as Cervus pardinensis	
Procapreolus cusanus	Nodule Bed	A small deer dating to the Pliocene	
Eucladoceros falconeri	Red Crag proper	A deer of Early Pleistocene age	
Gazella sp.		A gazelle of Early Pleistocene age	
Leptobos etruscus	Nodule Bed	A bovine of Pliocene age closely related to living bison.	Skeleton of L. etruscus on display in Italy

==== Primates ====
Genus/species	Locality	Notes	Image
Mesopithecus sp.	Nodule Bed	Known from a single tooth. A monkey belonging to the subfamily Colobinae, related to living African colobus monkeys and Asian langurs. Possibly of Late Miocene-Early Pliocene age.	Life restoration of the related Mesopithecus pentelicus from China, Artwork by Mauricio Anton.
Macaca sp.	Nodule Bed	An indeterminate macaque known from a tooth, possibly of Early Pliocene age. Has affinities with the Barbary macaque (Macaca sylvanus), which has a fossil record in Europe spanning the Pliocene and into the Pleistocene.	

==== Rodents ====
Genus/species	Locality	Notes	Image
Hystrix sp.		An Old World porcupine, of Early Pleistocene age	
Castor fiber		Commonly known as the Eurasian beaver, species extant, remains are of Early Pleistocene age	
Trogontherium minus	Nodule Bed	A member of the beaver family (Castoridae) belonging to the extinct genus Trogontherium, of Pliocene-Early Pleistocene age	

==== Carnivorans ====
Genus/species	Locality	Notes	Image
Parailurus anglicus		A member of the family Ailuridae, closely related to the living red panda, of Pliocene age	Tooth of P. anglicus from Italy
Puma pardoides		A medium sized cat related to the living cougar/mountain lion (Puma concolor)	Skull on display in Italy
Pliocrocuta perrieri		A large bone cracking hyena, of Pliocene-Early Pleistocene age	Skull on display in Italy
Ursidae indet.		A large bear	
Ontocetus emmonsi		An extinct genus of pinniped in the family Odobenidae, related to the living walrus. Known from tusks. Previously referred to as Odobenus huxleyi and Trichecodon huxleyi	

==== Cetaceans ====
Genus/species	Locality	Notes	Image
"Balaenodon physaloides"		A problematic toothed whale taxon known from abraded teeth, suggested to be part of Physeteroidea, the group that includes the sperm whale and its close relatives.	
Belemnoziphius compressus		A beaked whale.	
Balaenopteridae indet.		Several species of rorqual whales have been described based on partial tympanic bullae, including Balaenoptera definata (Owen, 1844) Balaenoptera emarginata (Owen, 1844) and Balaenoptera or Balaena gibbosa Owen, 1844, but these are now considered nomina dubia due to their fragmentary nature	
Delphinidae indet.		Indeterminate remains of oceanic dolphins	

=== Fish ===
Genus/species	Locality	Notes	Image
Otodus megalodon		Known from a tooth. A giant macropredatory shark, the largest shark ever	Megalodon tooth from Chile
Micromesistius poutassou		Known from an otolith. Commonly known as blue whiting, species extant	Drawing of a modern blue whiting

=== Invertebrates ===
Over 240 mollusc species have been described from the Red Crag, making the table below only a small fraction of the total number of invertebrates.

Genus/species	Locality	Notes	Image
Glycymeris glycymeris		Commonly known as a "dog cockle", belongs to the bittersweet clam family Glycymerididae, species extant	Modern specimen of a dog cockle (Glycymeris glycymeris)
Tapes		A saltwater clam	
Spisula		A surf clam	Specimen of a modern Spisula solida surf clam
Macoma		A saltwater clam, includes extinct species	
Mya arenaria		Commonly known as the soft-shell clam, species extant	Modern soft-shell clam (Mya arenaria) valve
Mytilus edulis		Commonly known as the blue mussel, species extant	Modern blue mussel (Mytilus edulis) valve
Varicorbula gibba		A bivalve commonly known as a basket shell, species extant	Modern specimen
Venerupis		A bivalve commonly known as carpet shells	Modern Venerupis corrugata specimen
Neptunea contraria		A true whelk, species extant though with a much more southerly modern range	Modern specimen
Nucella lapillus		Commonly known as the dog whelk, species extant	Modern specimen
Cerastoderma edule		Known as the common cockle, species extant	Modern specimen
Anomia		A saltwater clam,	Modern specimen of Anomia ephippium
Buccinum		A true whelk	Modern specimen of Buccinum undatum
Capulus		A cap snail	Modern specimen of Capulus ungaricus
Calyptraea chinensis		A superficially limpet-like gastropod, commonly known as the Chinese hat snail, species extant	Modern specimen
Emarginula crassa		A species of keyhole limpet, still extant	Modern specimen
Venus casina		A saltwater clam, species extant	Drawing of modern specimen
Aporrhais pespelecani		A gastropod, species extant	Modern specimen
Turritella communis		A sea snail, species extant	Modern specimen
Euspira catena		A sea snail, commonly known as the large necklace shell, species extant	Modern specimen
Colus gracilis		A sea snail, species extant	Modern specimen
Ensis		A razor clam	Modern specimen of Ensis minor
Terebratula		A terebratulid brachiopod	A fossil specimen of Terebrantula ampulla from the Pliocene of Spain

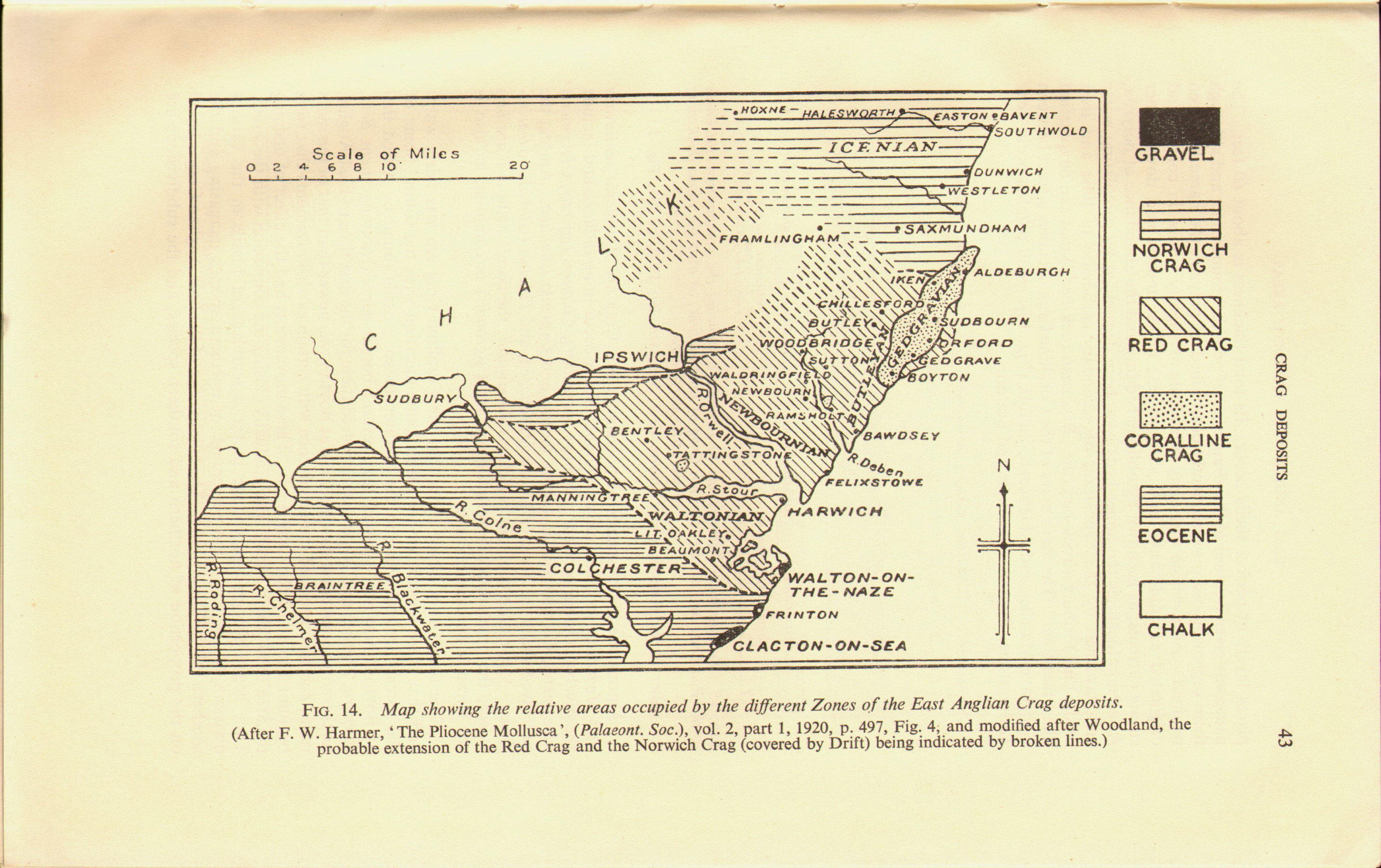
Geological map of the Crag Deposits. From Chatwin (1954).

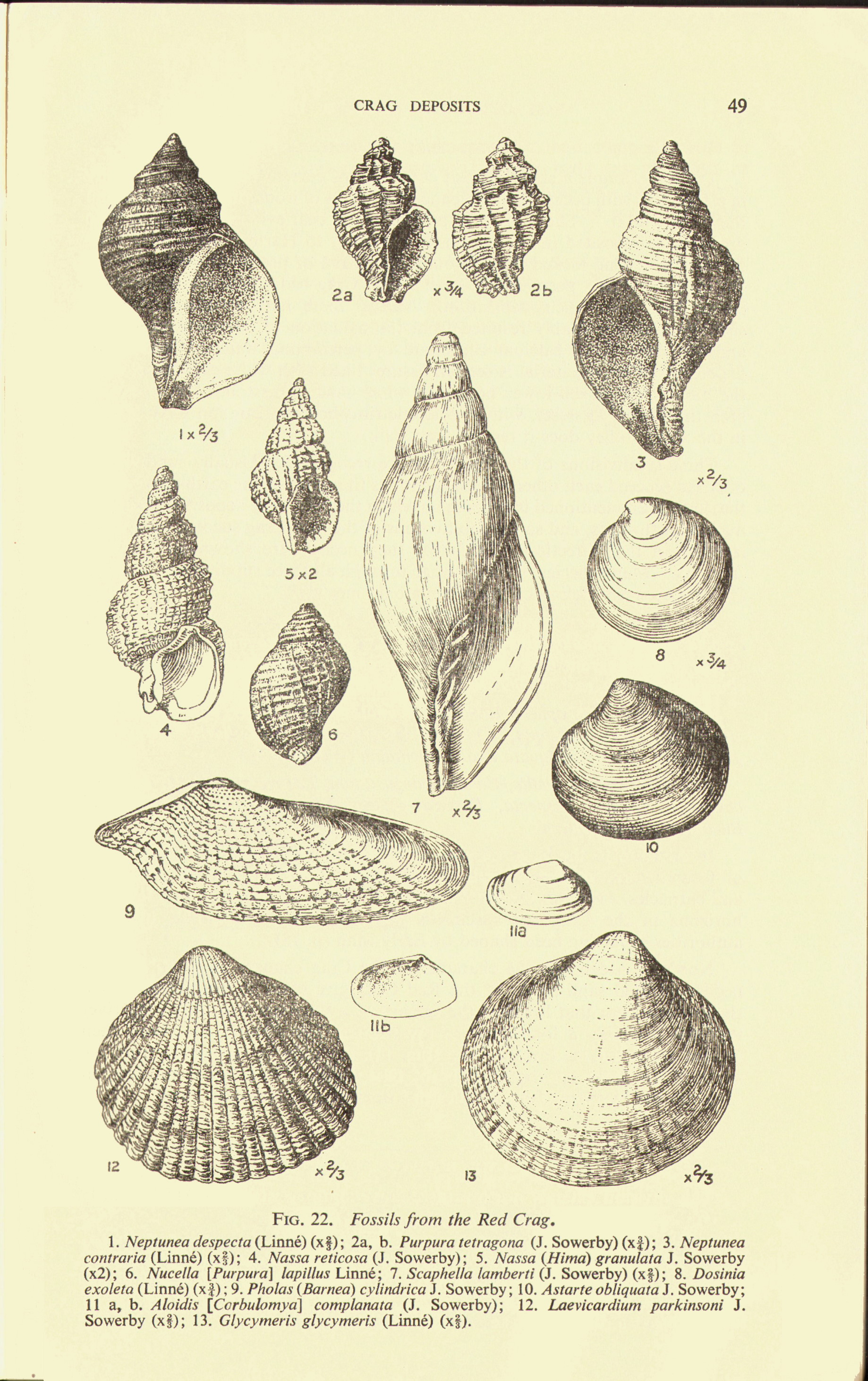
Fossils from the Red Crag. From Chatwin (1954).

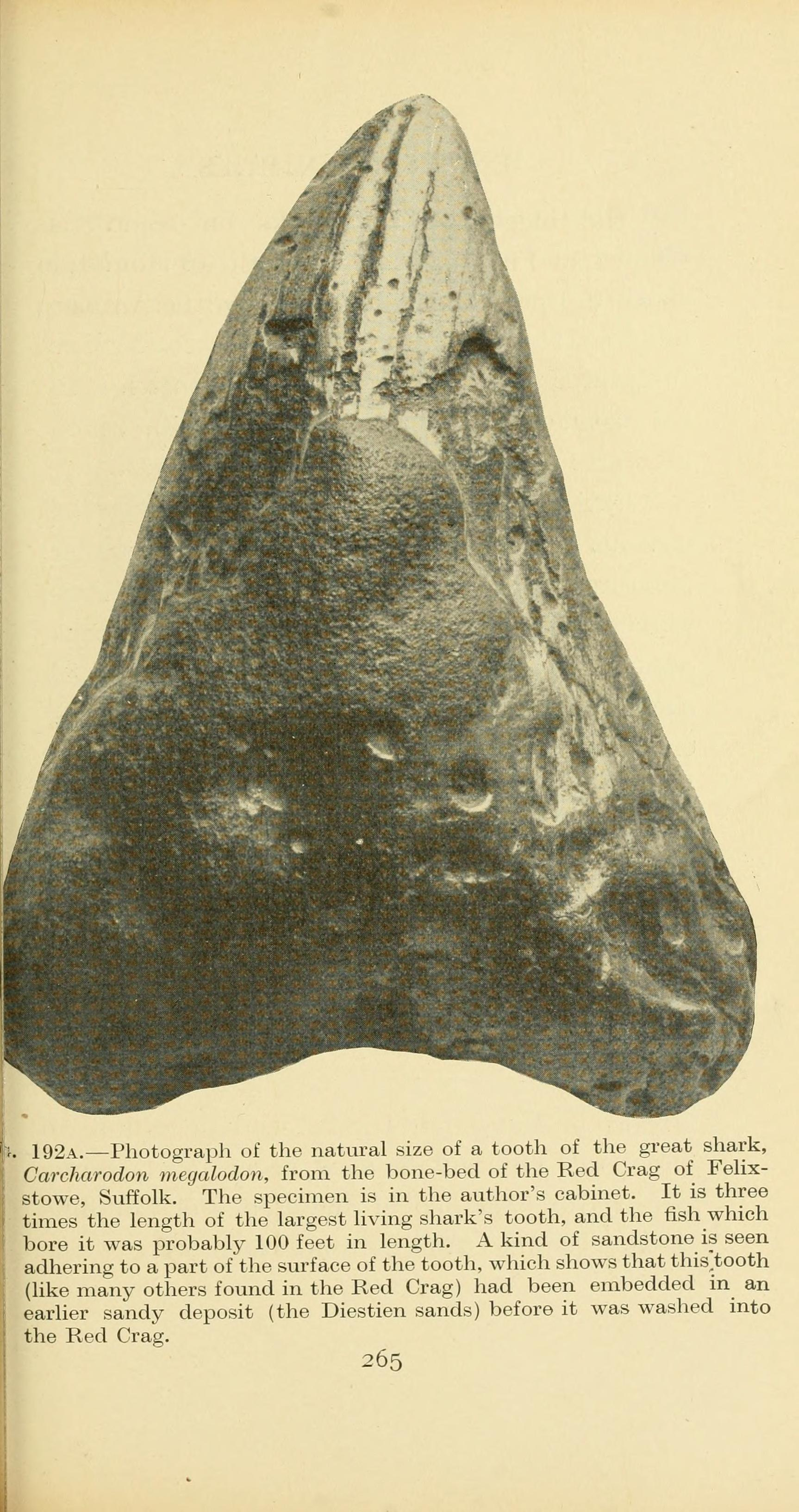
Shark tooth fossil from the Red Crag at Felixstowe in Suffolk

== See also ==
- Cromer Forest Bed fossiliferous Pleistocene deposit in Norfolk, England
