= Caledonia Glacigenic Group =

Quaternary lithostratigraphic group in Great Britain

- Stratigraphic range: Devensian
- Type: Group
- Unit of: Great Britain Superficial Deposits Supergroup
- Underlies: Britannia Catchments Group, British Coastal Deposits Group
- Thickness: up to 120m

Lithology
- Primary: till (diamicton)
- Other: gravel, sand, clay, silt

Location
- Country: England, Scotland, Wales
- Extent: all of Great Britain to the north and west of the Devensian glacial limit

The Caledonia Glacigenic Group is a Quaternary lithostratigraphic group (a sequence of rock strata or other definable geological units) present across the whole of Great Britain to the north and west of the furthest limit of Devensian glaciation i.e. throughout Scotland, Wales and northern England. It consists of a wide range of deposits deriving from the Devensian glaciation of glacial, glaciofluvial, glaciolacustrine and glaciomarine origin. It was previously known as the South Britain Glacigenic Group. Its upper boundary is the present day ground surface or an unconformable contact with the Britannia Catchments Group or the British Coastal Deposits Group.

The following subgroups are defined:

- Shetland Glacigenic Subgroup
- Western Isles Glacigenic Subgroup
- Northwest Highlands Glacigenic Subgroup
- Banffshire Coast and Caithness Glacigenic Subgroup
- Inverness Glacigenic Subgroup
- East Grampian Glacigenic Subgroup
- Logie-Buchan Glacigenic Subgroup
- Central Grampian Glacigenic Subgroup
- Mearns Glacigenic Subgroup
- Midland Valley Glacigenic Subgroup
- Borders Glacigenic Subgroup
- Southern Uplands Glacigenic Subgroup
- Irish Sea Coast Glacigenic Subgroup
- Manx Glacigenic Subgroup
- Central Cumbria Glacigenic Subgroup
- North Pennine Glacigenic Subgroup
- North Sea Coast Glacigenic Subgroup
- Wales Glacigenic Subgroup
