= Albion Glacigenic Group =

Quaternary lithostratigraphic group in Great Britain

- Stratigraphic range: Cromerian to Ipswichian age
- Type: Group
- Unit of: Great Britain Superficial Deposits Supergroup
- Underlies: unconformable beneath Caledonia Glacigenic Group, Britannia Catchments Group, British Coastal Deposits Group
- Overlies: bedrock
- Thickness: up to 120m

Lithology
- Primary: till (diamicton)
- Other: sand, gravel, silt and clay

Location
- Country: England, Scotland, Wales
- Extent: all of Great Britain north of the southern limit of Anglian glacial limit, but south of the Devensian glacial limit

The Albion Glacigenic Group is a Quaternary lithostratigraphic group (a sequence of rock strata or other definable geological units) present in those parts of Great Britain which lie north of the southern limit of Anglian glaciation, but south of the Devensian glacial limit, and also includes deposits in the Isle of Man and offshore areas. It consists of a wide range of unconsolidated superficial deposits including till, sands, gravels, silts and clay of glacial, glaciofluvial, glaciolacustrine and glaciomarine origin. Its upper boundary is the present day ground surface or unconformable contact with units of the Caledonia Glacigenic Group, the Britannia Catchments Group or the British Coastal Deposits Group. It was previously known as the South Britain Glacigenic Group or Older Drift

The following subgroups are defined by geographical areas of Great Britain:

- Shetland Glacigenic (Albion) Subgroup
- Western Isles (Albion) Glacigenic Subgroup
- Northwest Highlands (Albion) Glacigenic Subgroup
- Banffshire Coast and Caithness (Albion) Glacigenic Subgroup
- Inverness (Albion) Glacigenic Subgroup
- East Grampian (Albion) Glacigenic Subgroup
- Logie-Buchan (Albion) Glacigenic Subgroup
- Central Grampian (Albion) Glacigenic Subgroup
- Mearns (Albion) Glacigenic Subgroup
- Midland Valley (Albion) Glacigenic Subgroup
- Borders (Albion) Glacigenic Subgroup
- Southern Uplands (Albion) Glacigenic Subgroup
- Irish Sea Coast (Albion) Glacigenic Subgroup
- Manx (Albion) Glacigenic Subgroup
- Central Cumbria (Albion) Glacigenic Subgroup
- North Pennine (Albion) Glacigenic Subgroup
- North Sea Coast (Albion) Glacigenic Subgroup
- Wales (Albion) Glacigenic Subgroup
