= Bramertonian Stage =

Biostratigraphic stage in the British Isles

The Bramertonian Stage is the name for an early Pleistocene biostratigraphic stage of geological history the British Isles. It precedes the Pre-Pastonian Stage (Baventian Stage). It derives its name from Bramerton Pits in Norfolk, where the deposits can be found on the surface. The exact timing of the beginning and end of the Bramertonian Stage is currently unknown. It is only known that it is equivalent to the Tiglian C1-4b Stage of Europe and early Pre-Illinoian Stage of North America. It lies somewhere in time between Marine Oxygen Isotope stages 65 to 95 and somewhere between 1.816 and 2.427 Ma (million years ago). The Bramertonian is correlated with the Antian stage identified from pollen assemblages in the Ludham borehole.

During this stage, the climate was temperate with evidence for mixed oak forest in southern England and the arrival of hemlock. Evidence from East Anglia suggests sea levels were higher than they are today.

== See also ==
- Ice age
- Glacial period
- Last glacial period
- Timeline of glaciation
