= List of counties of England and Wales in 1964 by highest point =

List of counties of England and Wales in 1964 by highest point. In 1964 they are more or less the ancient counties, with the addition of the County of London and a number of historic divisions in place as administrative counties: Cambridgeshire into the Isle of Ely and Cambridgeshire; Hampshire into the Isle of Wight and Hampshire; Lincolnshire into the Parts of Holland, Kesteven and Lindsey; Northamptonshire into Soke of Peterborough and Northamptonshire; Suffolk into East and West; Sussex into East and West; and Yorkshire into the East, North and West Ridings.

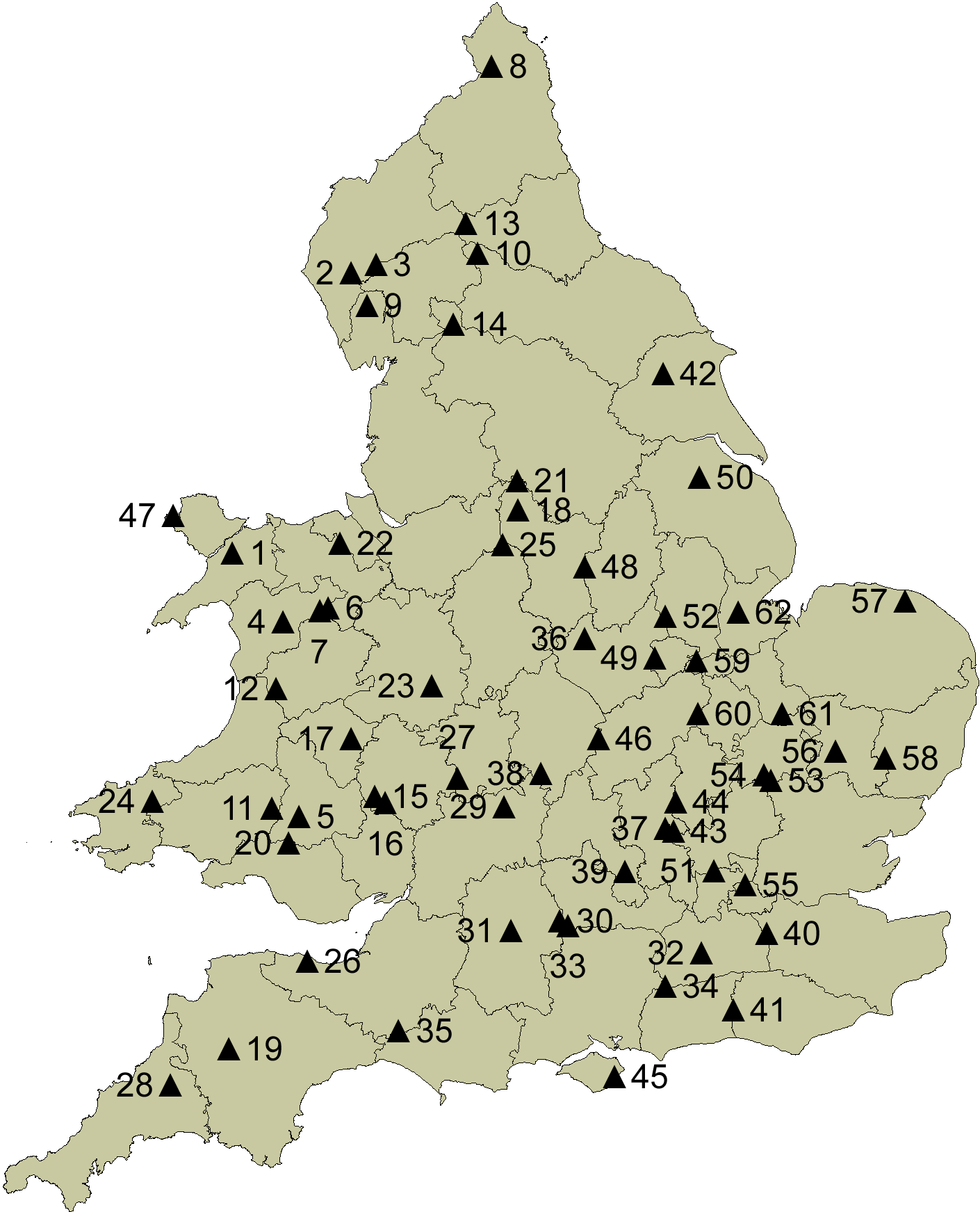
England and Wales, showing county tops in 1964

Rank	County	Country	Height (m)	Height (ft)	Hill	Grid reference
1	Caernarfonshire	Wales	1,085	3,560	Snowdon	SH6098954379
2	Cumberland	England	978	3,209	Scafell Pike	NY2154207217
3	Westmorland	England	950	3,117	Helvellyn	NY3426015090
4	Merionethshire	Wales	905	2,969	Aran Fawddwy	SH8627222386
5	Brecknockshire	Wales	886	2,906	Pen y Fan	SO0121221588
6	Denbighshire	Wales	830	2,726	Cadair Berwyn	SJ0716532355
7	Montgomeryshire	Wales	827	2,726	Moel Sych	SJ0663231863
8	Northumberland	England	815	2,674	The Cheviot	NT9090420522
9	Lancashire	England	803	2,634	Coniston Old Man	SD2723797827
10	Yorkshire, North Riding	England	788	2,585	Mickle Fell	NY8058224534
11	Carmarthenshire	Wales	781	2,562	Fan Foel	SN8214022338
12	Cardiganshire	Wales	752	2,467	Pen Pumlumon Fawr	SN7897186945
13	Durham	England	746	2,447	Burnhope Seat	NY7879037536
14	Yorkshire, West Riding	England	736	2,415	Whernside	SD7385081415
15	Herefordshire	England	700	2,297	Black Mountain	SO2558835051
16	Monmouthshire	Wales	680	2,228	Chwarel y Fan	SO2581929416
17	Radnorshire	Wales	660	2,166	Great Rhos	SO1821963902
18	Derbyshire	England	636	2,087	Kinder Scout	SK0851887520
19	Devon	England	621	2,037	High Willhays	SX5802389203
20	Glamorgan	Wales	600	1,969	Craig y Llyn	SN9068903156
21	Cheshire	England	582	1,909	Black Hill	SE0781604687
22	Flintshire	Wales	555	1,817	Moel Famau	SJ1610962667
23	Shropshire	England	540	1,772	Brown Clee Hill	SO5936686556
24	Pembrokeshire	Wales	536	1,760	Foel Cwmcerwyn	SN0940931161
25	Staffordshire	England	520	1,705	Cheeks Point on Cheeks Hill	SK0260969904
26	Somerset	England	519	1,702	Dunkery Beacon	SS8914341587
27	Worcestershire	England	425	1,394	Worcestershire Beacon	SO7688445223
28	Cornwall	England	420	1,378	Brown Willy	SX1587280004
29	Gloucestershire	England	330	1,082	Cleeve Hill	SO9969624599
30	Berkshire	England	297	974	Walbury Hill	SU3734861631
31	Wiltshire	England	295	967	Milk Hill	SU1041564341
32	Surrey	England	294	965	Leith Hill	TQ1394943162
33	Hampshire, Hampshire	England	286	938	Pilot Hill	SU3987560111
34	Sussex, West	England	280	918	Blackdown	SU9193529613
35	Dorset	England	279	915	Lewesdon Hill	ST4377801172
36	Leicestershire	England	278	912	Bardon Hill	SK4599213199
37	Buckinghamshire	England	267	875	Haddington Hill	SP8907209088
38	Warwickshire	England	261	856	Ebrington Hill	SP1877942633
39	Oxfordshire	England	257	843	Bald Hill	SU7288595775
40	Kent	England	251	823	Betsom's Hill	TQ4355556332
41	Sussex, East	England	248	813	Ditchling Beacon	TQ3316413070
42	Yorkshire, East Riding	England	246	807	Bishop Wilton Wold	SE8218257026
43	Hertfordshire	England	244	800	Pavis Wood	SP9142009190
44	Bedfordshire	England	243	797	Dunstable Downs	TL0088119424
45	Hampshire, Isle of Wight	England	241	791	St Boniface Down	SZ5673678548
46	Northamptonshire, Northamptonshire	England	225	738	Arbury Hill	SP5401558770
47	Anglesey	Wales	220	722	Holyhead Mountain	SH2185882948
48	Nottinghamshire	England	205	673	Newtonwood Lane	SK4561760649
49	Rutland	England	197	646	Cold Overton Park	SK8270808533
50	Lincolnshire, Parts of Lindsey	England	168	551	Normanby Top, The Wolds	TF1211096470
51	Middlesex	England	155	509	Bushey Heath	TQ1523593970
52	Lincolnshire, Parts of Kesteven	England	151	495	Viking Way	SK8896923714
53	Essex	England	147	482	Chrishall Common	TL4430136202
54	Cambridgeshire	England	146	479	Great Chishill	TL4273038626
55	County of London	England	134	440	Hampstead Heath	TQ2641586728
56	West Suffolk	England	128	420	Great Wood	TL7869055863
57	Norfolk	England	105	343	Beacon Hill	TG1835941425
58	East Suffolk	England	90	295	Wattisham Airfield	TM0238250185
59	Northamptonshire, Soke of Peterborough	England	81	266	Racecourse Road	TF0353004169
60	Huntingdonshire	England	80	263	Boring Field	TL0472071050
61	Cambridgeshire, Isle of Ely	England	39	128	Haddenham village	TL4671075214
62	Lincolnshire, Parts of Holland	England	8	26	Pinchbeck Marsh	TF2788028610

== Footnotes ==
1. The foot measurement is derived from the Ordnance Survey metre measurement, multiplied by 3.2808.
