= List of ceremonial counties of England by highest point =

Colour-coded map of highest points in each ceremonial county. 800–1000 m 700–799 m 600–699 m 500–599 m 400–499 m 300–399 m 250–299 m 200–249 m 160–199 m 125–159 m 0–124 m

This is a list of the ceremonial counties of England by their highest point.

Rank	Ceremonial county	Height (m)	Relative height	Name	Grid reference
1	Cumbria	978	912	Scafell Pike	NY215072
2	Northumberland	815	556	The Cheviot	NT909205
3	Durham	788	210	Mickle Fell	NY805245
4	North Yorkshire	736	408	Whernside	SD738814
5	Herefordshire	703	154	Black Mountain	SO255350
6	Derbyshire	636	488	Kinder Scout	SK085875
7	Lancashire	628	30	Green Hill	SD701820
8	Devon	621	533	High Willhays	SX580892
9	West Yorkshire	582	165	Black Hill	SE078046
10	Cheshire	559	236	Shining Tor	SJ994737
11	South Yorkshire	548	53	High Stones	SK188943
12	Greater Manchester	542	34	Black Chew Head	SE056019
13	Shropshire	540	373	Brown Clee Hill	SO593865
14	Staffordshire	520	0	Cheeks Point on Cheeks Hill	SK026699
15	Somerset	519	414	Dunkery Beacon	SS891415
16	Worcestershire	425	337	Worcestershire Beacon	SO768452
17	Cornwall	420	314	Brown Willy	SX158800
18	Gloucestershire	330	242	Cleeve Hill	SO996245
19	Berkshire	297	188	Walbury Hill	SU373616
20	Surrey	295	246	Leith Hill	TQ139431
21	Wiltshire	294	149	Milk Hill	SU104643
22	Hampshire	286	47	Pilot Hill	SU398601
23	West Sussex	280	191	Black Down	SU919296
24	Dorset	279	185	Lewesdon Hill	ST437011
25	Leicestershire	278	170	Bardon Hill	SK459131
26	West Midlands	271	87	Turners Hill	SO967887
27	Buckinghamshire	267	180	Haddington Hill	SP890090
28=	Oxfordshire	261	79	Whitehorse Hill	SU300863
28=	Warwickshire	261	111	Ebrington Hill	SP187426
30	Tyne and Wear	259	13	Currock Hill	NZ107592
31	Kent	251	15	Betsom's Hill	TQ435563
32	East Sussex	248	213	Ditchling Beacon	TQ331130
33	East Riding of Yorkshire	246	203	Bishop Wilton Wold	SE821570
34	Greater London	245	0	NE shoulder of Westerham Heights	TQ436564
35	Hertfordshire	244	0	NE shoulder of Pavis Wood	SP914091
36	Bedfordshire	243	105	Dunstable Downs	TL008194
37	Isle of Wight	241	241	St Boniface Down	SZ569785
38	Northamptonshire	225	102	Arbury Hill, Big Hill	SP540587, SP549612
39	Nottinghamshire	204	69	Newtonwood Lane	SK456606
40	Rutland	197	11	Cold Overton Park	SK827085
41	Merseyside	179	155	Billinge Hill	SD525014
42	Lincolnshire	168	162	Normanby le Wold Top	TF121964
43	Bristol	160		east of Dundry Hill	ST593668
44	Essex	147		Chrishall Common	TL443362
45	Cambridgeshire	146		Great Chishill	TL427386
46	Suffolk	128	37	Great Wood Hill	TL786558
47	Norfolk	103	79	Beacon Hill	TG183414
48	City of London	22		High Holborn	TQ310816

== See also ==
- List of counties of England and Wales in 1964 by highest point
- List of mountains and hills of the United Kingdom
- List of Scottish council areas by highest point
- List of Scottish counties by highest point
- List of Welsh principal areas by highest point
- List of Northern Ireland districts by highest point
- List of Northern Ireland counties by highest point

== Sources ==
- County and Unitary Authority Tops from the Database of British and Irish Hills, which holds information on all English county and unitary authority tops.
