= Arbury Hill =

Hill in Northamptonshire, England

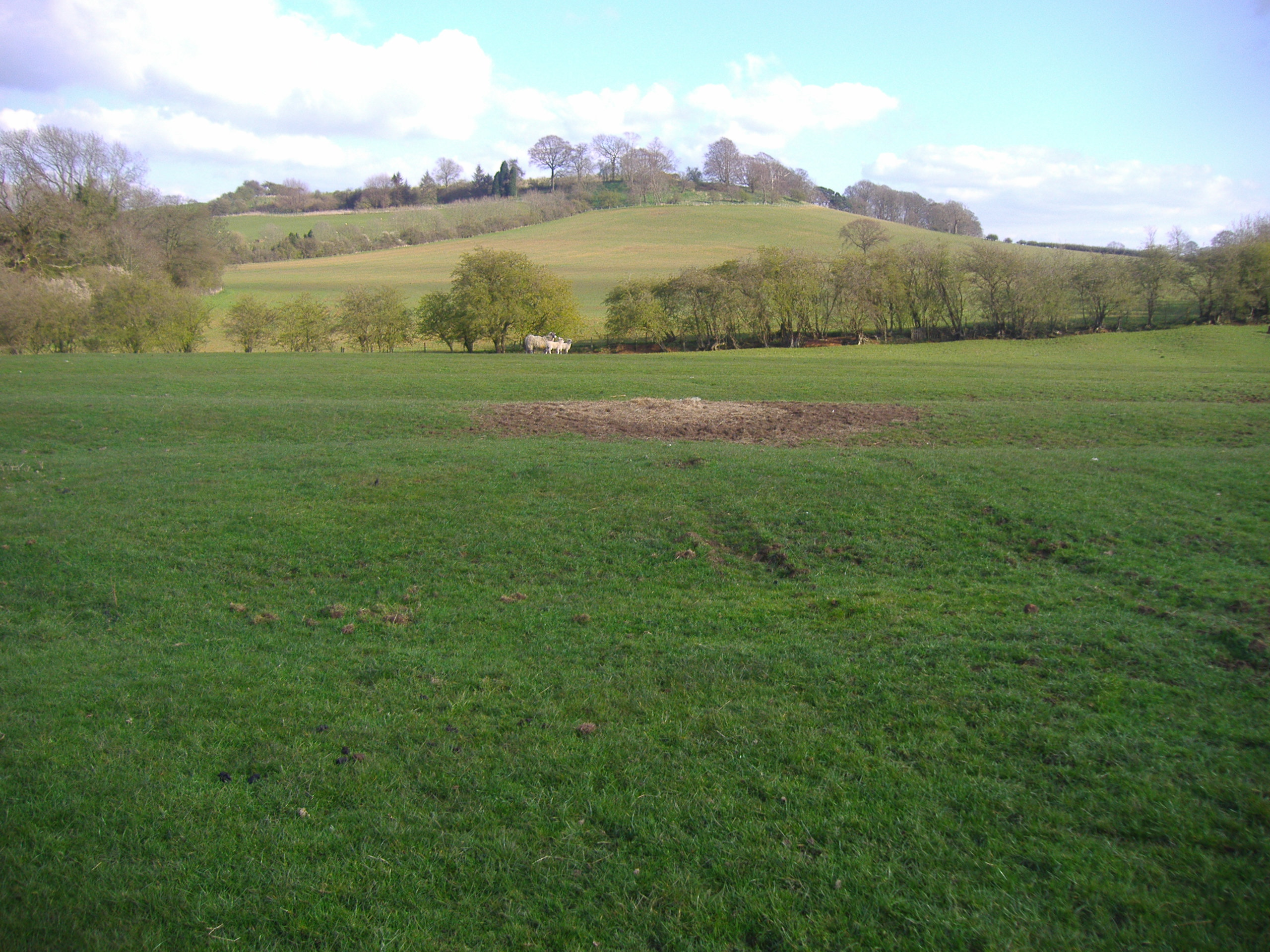
- Arbury Hill from the west

Highest point
- Elevation: 225 m (738 ft)
- Listing: County top
- Coordinates: 52°13′27″N 1°12′36″W

Geography
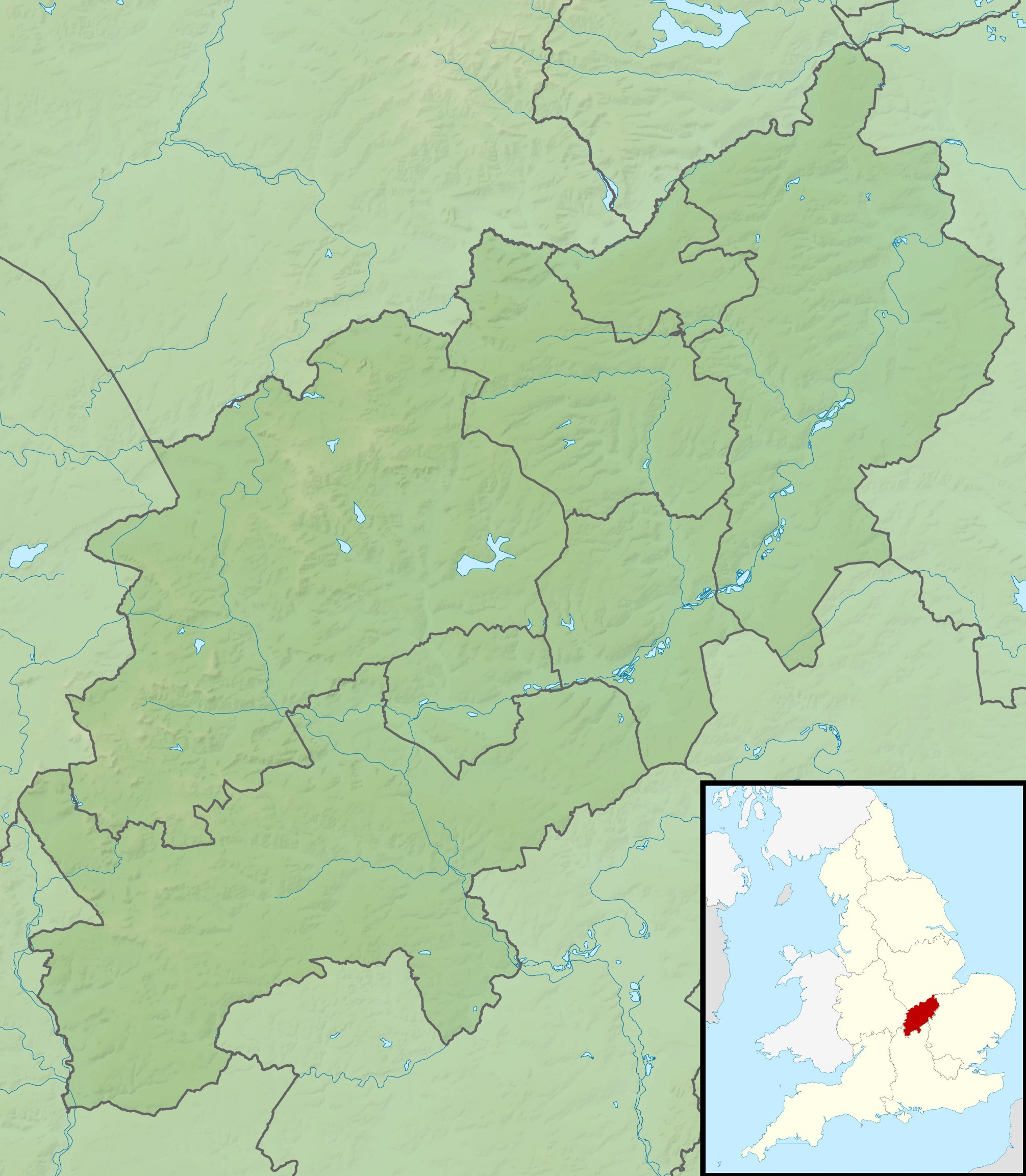
- Location within Northamptonshire
- Location: Northamptonshire, England
- OS grid: SP540587
- Topo map: OS Explorer 206

Arbury Hill, at 225 m (738 ft), is the joint highest point in the English county of Northamptonshire. It is 9 km (5.6 mi) southwest of the town of Daventry.

The slopes of Arbury Hill are a drainage divide between three major river catchment areas, with the Nene to the north, east and south, the Cherwell (a tributary of the Thames) to the south-west and the Leam (a tributary of the Severn) to the west and north-west. There are fine views with Rugby and Coventry visible to the northwest and Northampton to the east. The River Nene rises in a swampy hollow on the northwestern flanks of the hill.

== History ==
On the summit of Arbury Hill there are the vestiges of an Iron Age Fort (grid reference SP540587), although its date and origin are disputed. The remains are in the form of a square ditch and embankment about 200 metres (yards) across. Although little trace remains of this fort, the outer bank encloses an area of about 12 acres (4.9 ha). It is mentioned as one of the boundary marks in a land grant of Edmund the Elder, as being the place where the three parishes of Badby, Dodford and Everdon meet.

The summit of Arbury Hill was one in a series of points used for triangulation in 1784 to determine the exact diameter and magnitude of the Earth, in a sequence of measurements undertaken by the British Government. There is a Triangulation station on the summit.

There is a motocross track on the east side and top of the hill that is used for competitions about three times a year. The soil is clayey, the site is steeply sloping and there are plenty of elevation changes, some off camber turns and a few smallish jumps.

Panorama

The following principal hills can be seen in perfect viewing conditions (distances in miles):

- N-NE: Big Hill (2), Honey Hill (13)
- NE-E: Borough Hill (4)
- E-SE: Hunsbury Hill (12), Warden Hill (40), Dunstable Downs (38)
- SE-S: Ivinghoe Beacon (37), Wendover Woods (38), Coombe Hill (38), Bald Hill (41), Muswell Hill (28)
- S-SW: Sharman's Hill (1)
- SW-W: Black Down (2), Brailes Hill (20), Broadway Tower (30), Ebrington Hill (24), Bredon Hill (38), Worcestershire Beacon (49)
- W-NW: Titterstone Clee Hill (60), Walton Hill (39), Beacon Hill (3), Turners Hill (40), Barr Beacon (38)
- NW-N: Ipstones Edge (65), Weaver Hills (61), Bardon Hill (34), Beacon Hill (35), Bradgate Park (33)

== Gallery ==
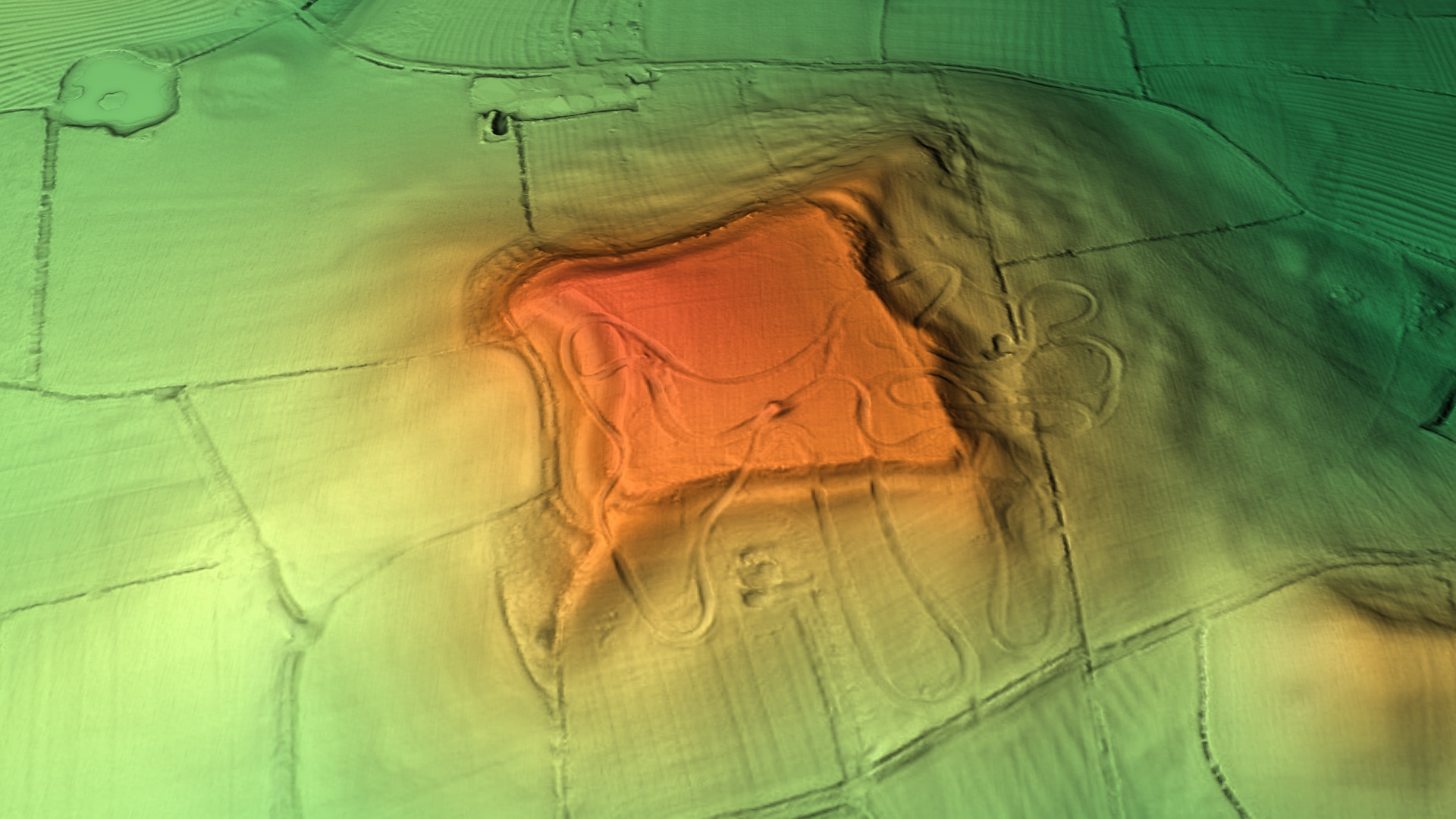
3D view of the digital terrain model

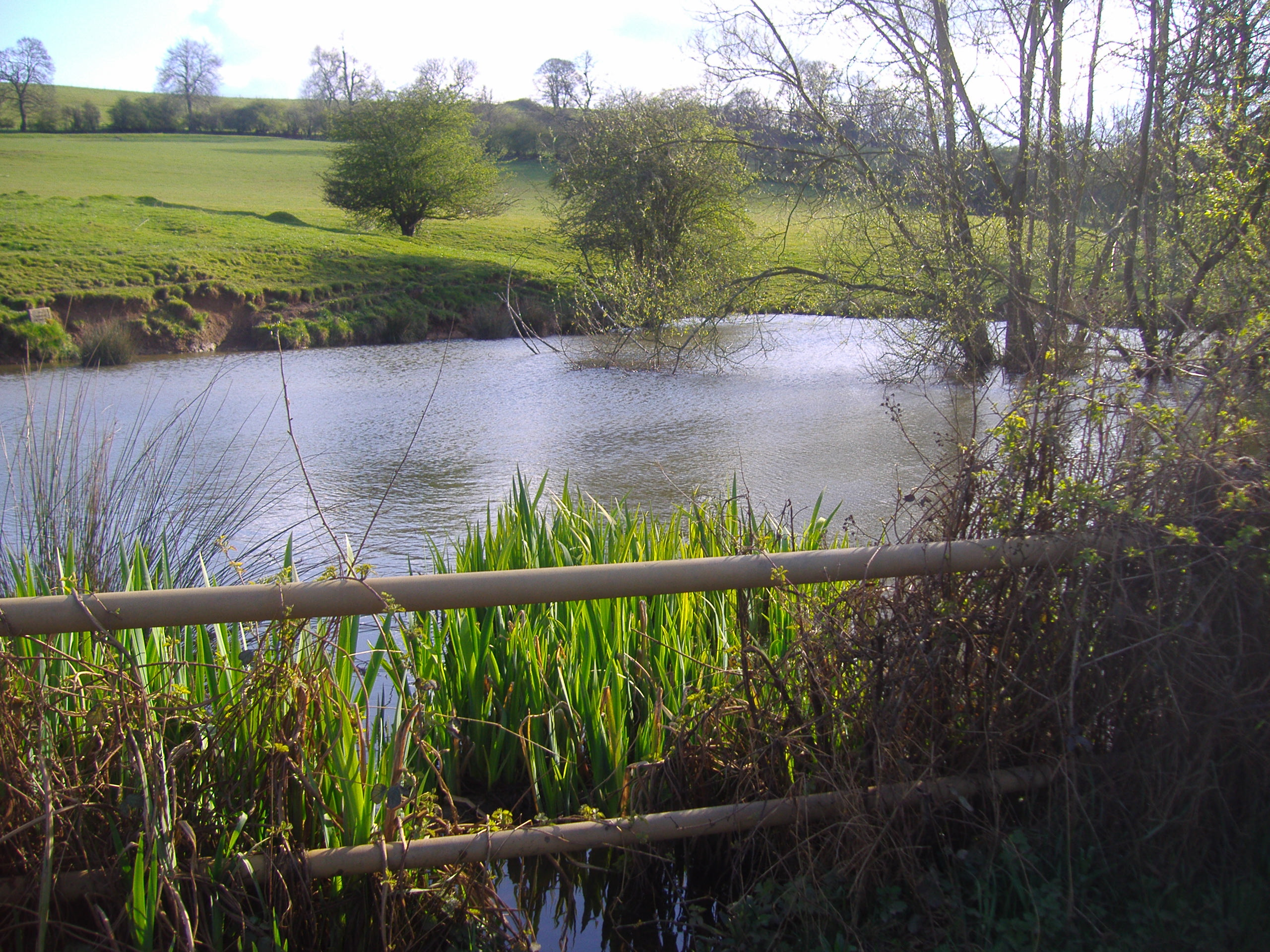
The headwater of the River Nene, on the north east slope of Arbury Hill in 2008

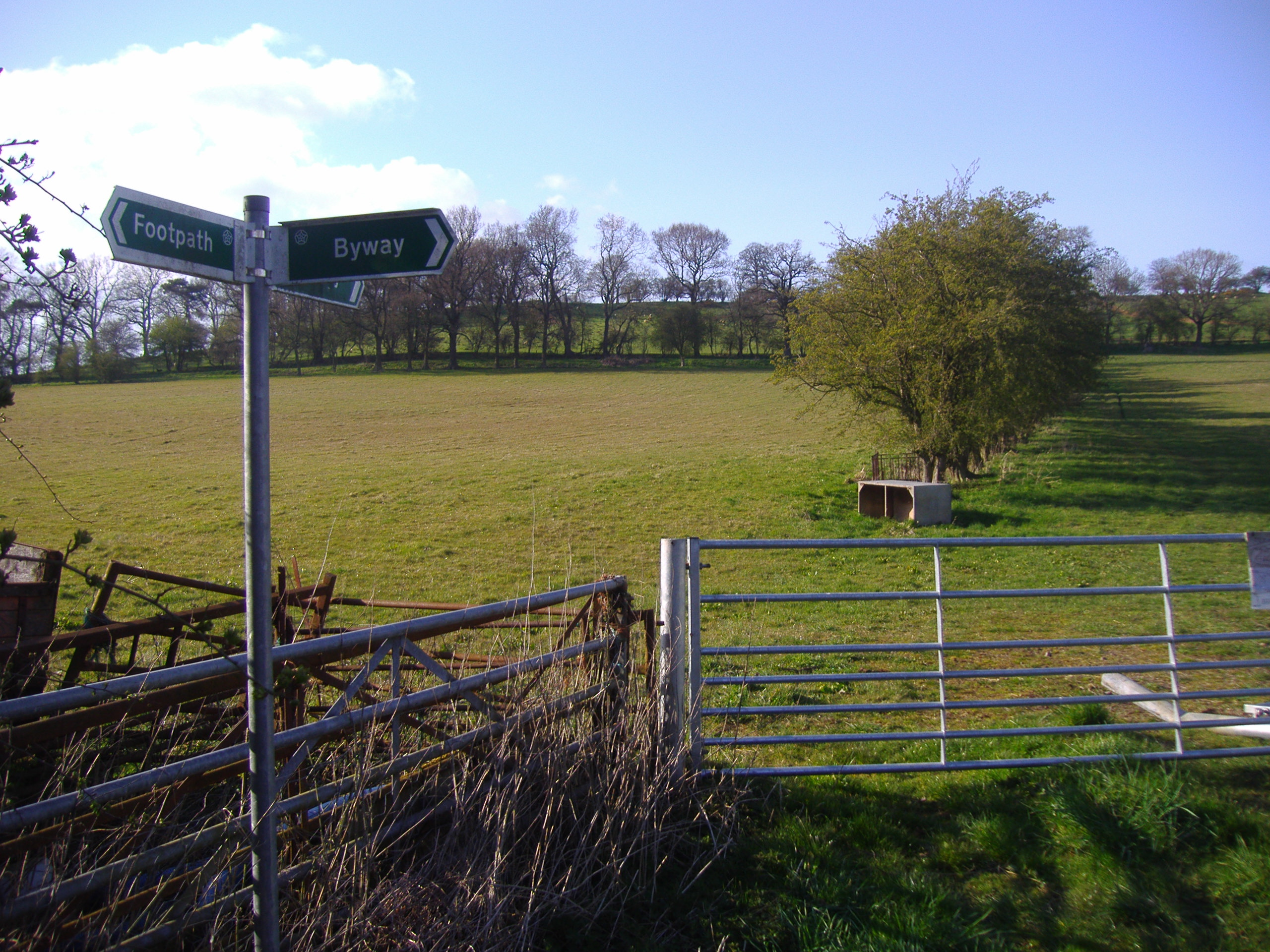
The southern side of the hill in 2008
