= List of Northern Ireland districts by highest point =

Map of Northern Ireland's districts

This is a list of the eleven current districts of Northern Ireland (borders laid out in 2012) by their highest point.

Rank	District	Height (m)	Relative height	Name	Grid reference
1	Newry, Mourne and Down	850	822	Slieve Donard	J357277
2	Derry and Strabane	678	657	Sawel Mountain	H618973
3	Fermanagh and Omagh	665	570	Cuilcagh	H123281
4	Causeway Coast and Glens	627	302	Mullaghaneany	D179236
5	Mid and East Antrim	474		Agnew's Hill	D327018
6	Belfast	389		Black Mountain	J305742
7	Mid Ulster	380		Sliabh Beagh	D179236
8	Armagh City, Banbridge and Craigavon	365		Carrigatuke	H903321
9	Antrim and Newtownabbey	319		Carnearny	J176927
10	Ards and North Down	217		Cairngaver	J454765
11	Lisburn and Castlereagh	186		Ouley Hill	J383626

== See also ==
- List of counties of England and Wales in 1964 by highest point
- List of ceremonial counties of England by highest point
- List of mountains and hills of the United Kingdom
- List of Scottish council areas by highest point
- List of Scottish counties by highest point
- List of Welsh principal areas by highest point
- List of Northern Ireland counties by highest point
