= List of Northern Ireland counties by highest point =

Relief map of Northern Ireland

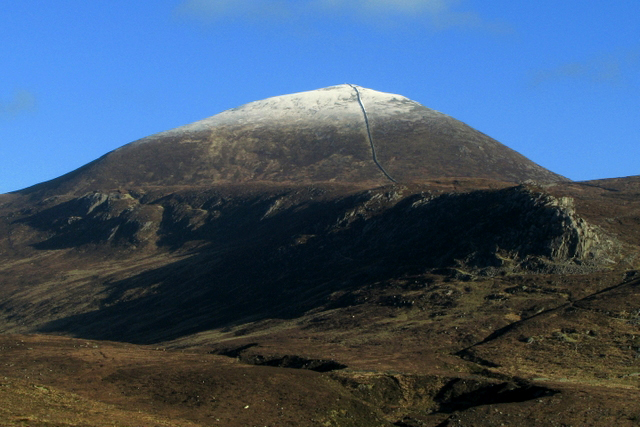
Slieve Donard

This is a list of the six traditional counties of Northern Ireland by their highest point.

Rank	County	Height (m)	Relative height	Name	Grid reference
1	Down	850	822	Slieve Donard	J357277
2–3	Londonderry and Tyrone	678	657	Sawel	H618973
4	Fermanagh	665	570	Cuilcagh	H123281
5	Armagh	573	478	Slieve Gullion	J025203
6	Antrim	550	515	Trostan	D179236

== See also ==
- List of Irish counties by highest point
- List of counties of England and Wales in 1964 by highest point
- List of ceremonial counties of England by highest point
- List of mountains and hills of the United Kingdom
- List of Scottish council areas by highest point
- List of Scottish counties by highest point
- List of Welsh principal areas by highest point
- List of Northern Ireland districts by highest point
