= Grim's Ditch (disambiguation) =

Grim's Ditch is the name of several bank and ditch earthworks in southern England, including:

- Grim's Ditch (Chilterns), a series of earthworks in the Chiltern Hills
- Grim's Ditch (Harrow), an area in the London Borough of Harrow

== See also ==
- Grim's Dyke
