= Haddington Hill =

Hill in Buckinghamshire, England

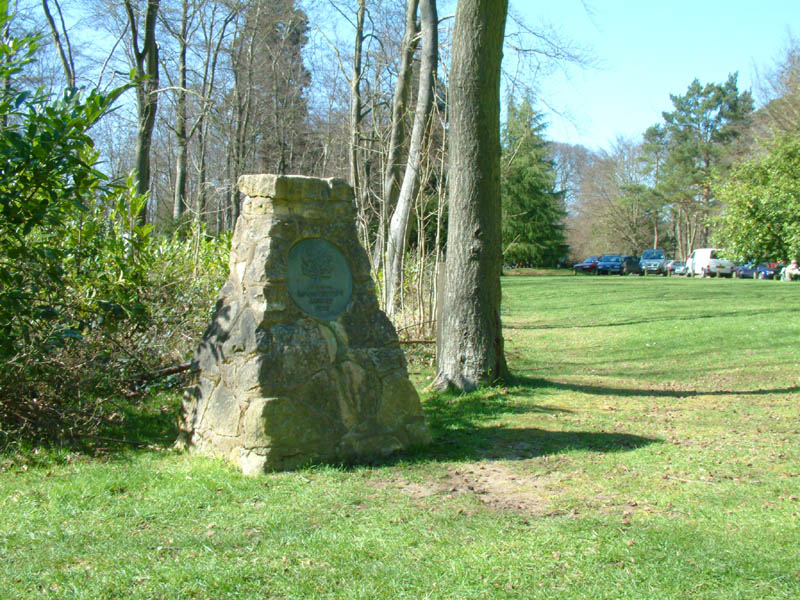
- Wendover Woods near the summit of Haddington Hill

Highest point
- Elevation: 267 m (876 ft)
- Prominence: 180 m (590 ft)
- Parent peak: Cleeve Hill
- Listing: Marilyn, County Top
- Coordinates: 51°46′18″N 0°42′42″W

Geography
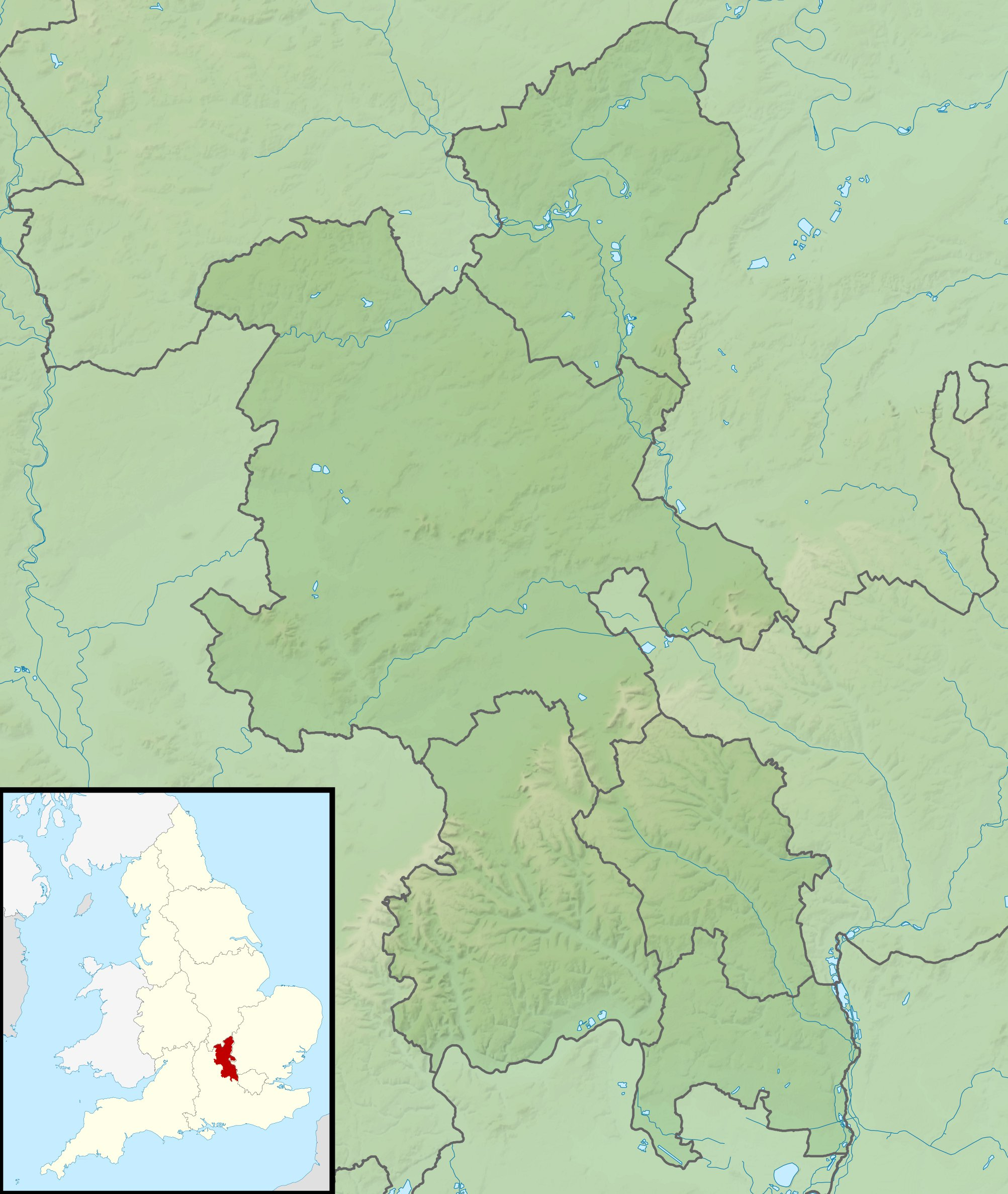
- Location within Buckinghamshire
- Location: Chiltern Hills, England
- OS grid: SP890089
- Topo map: OS Landranger 165

Listed summits of Haddington Hill
Name	Grid ref	Height	Status
Pavis Wood	SP914091	244 m (801 ft)	County Top

Haddington Hill (also called Wendover Hill) is a hill in The Chilterns within the parish of Halton, and the highest point in the English county of Buckinghamshire. On the north-eastern flank is Coombe Hill, not to be confused with another Coombe Hill 4 kilometres (2.5 mi) to the south-west.

Haddington Hill is owned by the Forestry Commission, whose Wendover Woods cover much of the hill. Many tracks run through the forest, and a car park is located near the summit among the trees: the flat summit means the precise location of the highest point is difficult to determine with certainty. However, in the woods to the east of the car park there are a series of large stones bearing the inscription 'The Chiltern Summit'. The stones are surrounded by trees.

== Ascents ==
The peak is accessible by road, with a car park near the stone. It is also possible to climb on foot.

== SOTA ==
Haddington Hill is known as Wendover Woods for the purposes of Summits On The Air due to its wide activation zone and has a SOTA reference of G/CE-005

== Pavis Wood ==
Pavis Wood, the highest point of Hertfordshire, at 244 m (801 ft), is on the eastern ridge of this hill, on the boundary with Buckinghamshire.

Panorama

The following principal hills may be seen from the summit plateau in perfect viewing conditions (distances in miles):

- N-NE: Ivinghoe Beacon (6)
- NE-E: Dunstable Downs (10)
- SE-S: Box Hill (40), Leith Hill (44), St Martha's Hill (39), Hascombe Hill (44), Hog's Back (38), Black Down (49)
- S-SW: Gibbet Hill (46), Bricksbury Hill (37), Wheatham Hill (52), Widdenton Park Hill (12)
- SW-W: Bald Hill (14), Coombe Hill (3), White Horse Hill (39), Boars Hill (25), Shotover Hill (20)
- W-NW: Wytham Hill (27), Muswell Hill (16), Cutsdean Hill (51), Ebrington Hill (48), Shenlow Hill (39)
- NW-N: Arbury Hill (38), Borough Hill (38), Honey Hill (45)

== See also ==
- List of Marilyns in England
