= Newmarket Ridge =

Ridge in England

Coordinates: 52.1719°N 0.6127°E

East Anglian Ridge
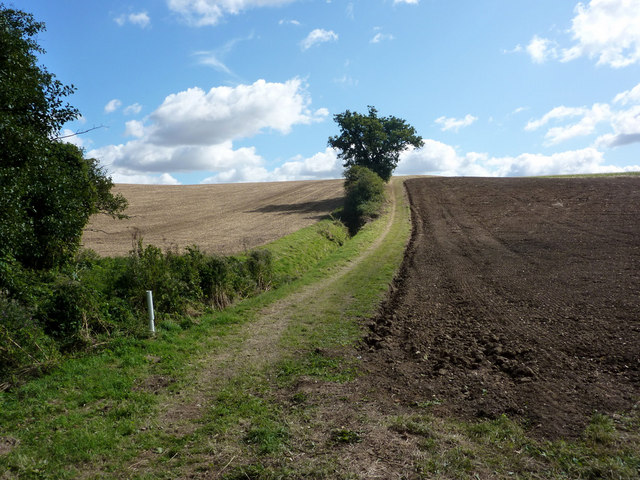
- The ridge in Suffolk.

Highest point
- Elevation: 128 m (420 ft)

Geography
- Location: East Anglia, United Kingdom

Geology
- Mountain type: Ridge

The Newmarket Ridge or East Anglian Ridge is a ridge starting north-west of Hertford, Hertfordshire near the Chiltern Hills and ending near Sudbury, Suffolk. It is approximately 40 miles (64 km) long and passes through Essex and south-east Cambridgeshire.

== Elevation ==
The highest point of the ridge is Great Wood Hill, which is also the highest point in Suffolk.

There are numerous tops over 100 m, but although the hills in this region tend to have fairly steep sides they have flat tops, leading to very low topographic prominence. A case in point is Biggin Common, near the village of Castle Camps. Despite being a prominent landmark and the highest point for nearly 15 miles in every direction, its prominence is only 20 m to the marginally higher Great Wood Hill, 18 miles away, the hills being connected by a ridge with very little change in height.
