= Richard Llewelyn Davies, Baron Llewelyn-Davies =

British architect (1912–1981)

The Right Honourable The Lord Llewelyn-Davies

Member of the House of Lords Lord Temporal
- In office 16 January 1964 – 27 October 1981; Life Peerage

Personal details
- Born: Richard Llewelyn Davies; 24 December 1912 London
- Died: 27 October 1981 (aged 68) St Bartholomew's Hospital, London
- Spouse(s): Ann Stephen (divorced) Pat Llewelyn-Davies, Baroness Llewelyn-Davies of Hastoe (m. 1943)
- Parent(s): Crompton Llewelyn Davies and Moya O'Connor
- Education: Trinity College, Cambridge
- Occupation: Architect and Planner
- Known for: Plan for Milton Keynes

Richard Llewelyn Davies, Baron Llewelyn-Davies (24 December 1912 – 27 October 1981) was a British architect and life peer.

== Life and career ==
Llewelyn Davies was educated at a private school in Ireland and at Trinity College, Cambridge, where he studied mechanical sciences and graduated in 1934. During his time at Cambridge, he was a member of the Cambridge Apostles, associating with left-wing students such as Anthony Blunt and Victor Rothschild. He later studied at the Ecole des Beaux Arts, Paris, and the Architectural Association (AA) in London, where his contemporaries included Elizabeth Chesterton and Ann MacEwen.

Llewelyn Davies was Professor of Architecture at The Bartlett, University College London, from 1960 to 1969, and Professor of Urban Planning and Head of the School of Environmental Studies from 1970 to 1975. He was the designer of Milton Keynes, Buckinghamshire.

On 16 January 1964, he was created a life peer with the title Baron Llewelyn-Davies, of Hastoe in the County of Hertfordshire.

He was married to Patricia Parry and had three children. As his wife was also made a life peeress, they were one of the few couples who both held titles in their own right.

Llewelyn-Davies was the son of Moya Llewelyn Davies and the grandson of Irish MP James O'Connor. He was also a first cousin of the Llewelyn Davies boys.

== Professional career ==
In 1960, Richard Llewelyn Davies and John Weeks formed the architectural and planning practice Llewelyn-Davies Weeks. It became known for hospital design and master planning in the UK. Major early commissions included the design of Northwick Park Hospital and offices for The Times newspaper.

The company grew with the addition of Walter Bor in 1964 and became Llewelyn-Davies, Weeks, Forestier-Walker, and Bor. It was known for the master planning of Milton Keynes. The company now trades as 'Llewelyn Davies' and retains the name 'Llewelyn Davies Weeks Ltd' in memory of the founding partners.

== Arms ==
Coat of arms of Richard Llewelyn Davies, Baron Llewelyn-Davies
Notes Coronet Coronet of a Baron Crest In front of two Dragon Wings conjoined in base Gules, a pair of Compasses erect and extended Or. Escutcheon Chevronny of eight Argent and Azure, a Fess embattled Gules. Supporters On either side a Stag proper, attired, unguled and gorged with a Collar embattled Or.
