= Elizabeth Chesterton =

British architect and town planner (1915–2002)

Dame Elizabeth Chesterton DBE
- Born: 12 October 1915; London, England
- Died: 18 August 2002 (aged 86); London, England
- Occupation: Architect
- Practice: Cambridgeshire County Council; Architectural Association School of Architecture

Dame Elizabeth Ursula Chesterton, DBE (12 October 1915 – 18 August 2002) was a British architect and town planner.

== Biography ==
Chesterton was born on 12 October 1915 in Hampstead Garden Suburb, London. Her father, Maurice Chesterton, was an architect, while her mother Dorothy Deck had connections with writers and artists in Bloomsbury. Her father would regularly live at sites where the buildings were being erected, including running the company that designed Royal Shakespeare Theatre under Elisabeth Scott.

Chesterton moved with her family within Hampstead in the 1920s. She attended King Alfred School, then Queen's College, before studying with Leonard Manasseh at the Architectural Association's School of Architecture in the late 1930s. She graduated from the school in 1939, and joined East Suffolk County Council in the planning department.

== Career ==
In 1947, Chesterton joined Cambridgeshire County Council as a development control officer, then from 1951, she spent two years at University College, London as an assistant to Ruth Glass, who was researching the post-war planning system.

She combined her work as a planning officer, working for Cambridgeshire County Council from 1947, with teaching at University College London and later at the Architectural Association. She worked with such notable architects as Richard Llewellyn Davies.

She served on the Royal Fine Art Commission, the National Trust's Architectural Panel and the Historic Buildings Council (later part of English Heritage) from the 1970s until the 1990s.

Chesterton was appointed DBE in the 1987 Birthday Honours.

National Life Stories conducted an oral history interview (C467/25) with Elizabeth Chesterton in 1997 for its Architects Lives' collection held by the British Library.

== Death ==
Chesterton had Alzheimer's disease at the end of her life, and died from bronchopneumonia at Chase Farm Hospital in Enfield, London, on 18 August 2002.
