= Little Chishill =

Village in Cambridgeshire, England

Coordinates: 52.0152°N 0.0665°E

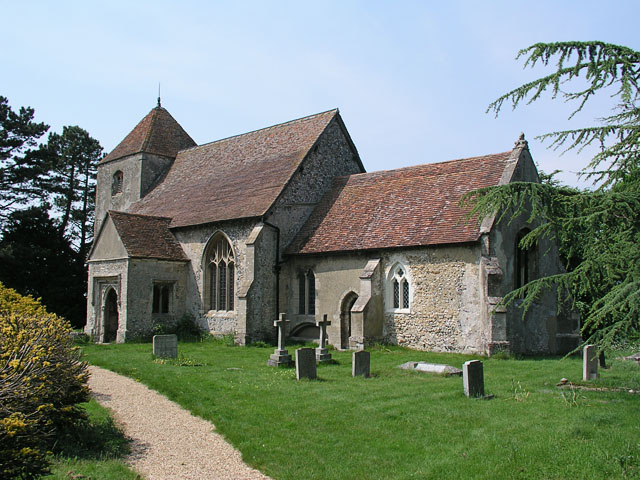
- St Nicholas' parish church, seen from the southeast

- Location within Cambridgeshire
- OS grid reference: TL419372
- Civil parish: Great and Little Chishill
- District: South Cambridgeshire
- Shire county: Cambridgeshire
- Region: East
- Country: England
- Sovereign state: United Kingdom
- Post town: Royston
- Postcode district: SG8
- Dialling code: 01763
- Police: Cambridgeshire
- Fire: Cambridgeshire
- Ambulance: East of England
- UK Parliament: South Cambridgeshire
- Website: Great & Little Chishill

Little Chishill is a village and former civil parish, now in the parish of Great and Little Chishill, in the South Cambridgeshire district, in the county of Cambridgeshire, England. It is 1 mile (1.6 km) south of the village of Great Chishill. In 1961 the parish had a population of 86. On 1 April 1968 the parish was abolished to form "Great and Little Chishill".

Little Chishill is about 1/4 mile (400 m) east of the county boundary with Hertfordshire and about 4 1/2 miles (7 km) southeast of Royston.

== Parish church ==
The Church of England parish church of Saint Nicholas is built of flint with limestone and clunch dressings. Its chancel is 12th-century and was extended in the 13th century. The nave was rebuilt in the 14th century, and the west tower and south porch are late 14th-century. New windows were inserted in the nave in the 15th century, and were replaced in the 19th century. The east window of the chancel and the belfry openings of the west tower are 16th-century. The church is a Grade II* listed building.

The parish's first recorded vicar was John Martyn in 1333.

== See also ==
- The Hundred Parishes

== Bibliography ==
- Pevsner, Nikolaus (1970) [1954]. Cambridgeshire. The Buildings of England. Harmondsworth: Penguin Books. pp. 427–428. ISBN 0-14-071010-8.
