= Hastoe =

Hamlet in Hertfordshire, England

Coordinates: 51.7755°N 0.6710°W

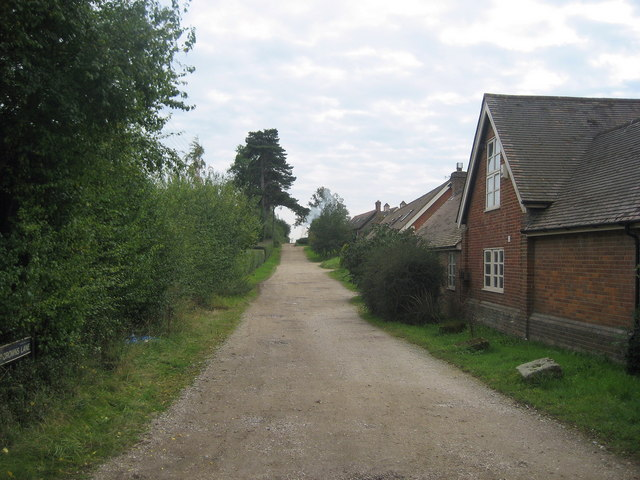

- Location within Hertfordshire
- OS grid reference: SP915095
- District: Dacorum
- Shire county: Hertfordshire
- Region: East
- Country: England
- Sovereign state: United Kingdom
- Post town: Tring
- Postcode district: HP23
- Dialling code: 01442
- Police: Hertfordshire
- Fire: Hertfordshire
- Ambulance: East of England
- UK Parliament: Harpenden and Berkhamsted

Hastoe (Halstowe or Halstoe in the 13th century) is a hamlet in the civil parish of Tring. It is located in the Chiltern Hills, 1.7m south of the town of Tring in the county of Hertfordshire and on the county boundary with Buckinghamshire.

The highest point in Hertfordshire is 244 m (801 ft) above sea level, this is a quarter-mile (400 m) from Hastoe within Pavis Wood. Running close to Hastoe is Grim's Ditch an Iron Age structure built around 300BC. The section in the Chilterns runs from Bradenham to Pitstone.

In the 13th century the manor of Hastoe was conveyed to Ralph le Clerk of Tring by Thomas de Northwode. During the 14th century the lands came into the possession of the Verney family. This resulted in the manor being annexed to the manor of Bunstreux and Richardyns. Hastoe has been closely associated with Tring with parts of Hastoe being incorporated into the Manor of Great Tring in the 17th century.

During the 19th century Hastoe became closely associated with the Rothschild family. Nathan Rothschild had begun to rent land and properties in the area as early as 1833, including Hastoe House, a large property in the centre of the hamlet. Nathan's son, Lionel de Rothschild like most of the family was said to be obsessed with hunting and set up his own kennels at Hastoe in 1838. Subsequently, Hastoe being as part of the Tring estate, came into the hands of Lionel de Rothschild acquiring it at auction in 1872. Many of the building of Hastoe were built by the Rothschilds, some following the demolition of earlier properties such as the Hastoe Brewery in 1882. Farm buildings were added to Hastoe, Oakengrove and Longcroft Farms and cottages erected for farm workers. Also built by the family were a chapel, which continued to serve a congregation until 1962, a corn mill, which burned down in 1964, and a distinctive Village Hall known as the Hastoe Room frequented by the Working Man's Club. The Rothschild's estate was sold at auction in October 1938.

Richard Llewellyn-Davies (1912–1981) was created Baron Llewelyn-Davies, of Hastoe on 16 January 1964. He was an architect and designer of Milton Keynes. Annie Patricia Llewellyn-Davies (1915–1997) his wife and Labour Party politician, became Baroness Llewelyn-Davies of Hastoe, on 29 August 1967.
