= Pat Llewelyn-Davies, Baroness Llewelyn-Davies of Hastoe =

British politician (1915–1997)

The Right Honourable The Baroness Llewelyn-Davies of Hastoe PC
- Llewellyn-Davies in 1967

Chief Whip of the House of Lords Captain of the Honourable Corps of Gentlemen-at-Arms
- In office 4 March 1974 – 4 May 1979
- Prime Minister: Harold Wilson; James Callaghan
- Preceded by: The Earl St Aldwyn
- Succeeded by: The Lord Denham

Baroness-in-Waiting Government Whip
- In office 13 March 1969 – 19 June 1970
- Prime Minister: Harold Wilson
- Preceded by: Lady Serota
- Succeeded by: The Lord Mowbray

Member of the House of Lords Lord Temporal
- In office 29 August 1967 – 6 November 1997; Life peerage

Personal details
- Born: Annie Patricia Parry; 16 July 1915 Birkenhead, England
- Died: 6 November 1997 (aged 82) Colchester, England
- Party: Labour
- Spouses: Alexander Francis Rawdon Smith (m. 1934, divorced) Richard Llewelyn Davies (m. 1943; died 1981)
- Children: 3
- Education: Girton College, Cambridge

Annie Patricia Llewelyn-Davies, Baroness Llewelyn-Davies of Hastoe, PC (née Parry; 16 July 1915 – 6 November 1997), was a British Labour Party politician and life peer. In 1973 she became the first woman to take charge of a whip's office in either of the houses of the Parliament of the United Kingdom, and she served in the 1974 to 1979 Labour Government as Captain of the Gentlemen-at-Arms (Government Chief Whip).

== Early and personal life ==
Llewelyn-Davies was born in Birkenhead in 1915 to Charles Percy Parry and Sarah Gertrude Parry (née Hamilton). She studied at Wallasey High School, Birkenhead High School, Liverpool College, Huyton and Girton College, Cambridge.

In 1934 she married Alexander Francis Rawdon Smith, a research physiologist; they had no children. After this marriage was dissolved, in 1943 she married Richard Llewelyn Davies, and their surname was hyphenated when Richard was elevated to the peerage as Lord Llewelyn-Davies. They had three daughters.

== Political career ==
Llewelyn-Davies entered the civil service in 1940 and served in the Ministry of War Transport, the Foreign Office, the Air Ministry and the Commonwealth Relations Office. She resigned to contest the Wolverhampton South-West parliamentary seat for Labour during the 1951 general election, but was defeated by the incumbent Conservative Enoch Powell. She subsequently unsuccessfully contested the Wandsworth Central seat in 1955 and 1959, but didn't stand for parliament again. With support of those in the Wilson government and the backing of close friend Richard Crossman, who described her in his diaries as "the real politician" when her husband was elevated to the peerage, she was created a life peer as Baroness Llewelyn-Davies of Hastoe, of Hastoe in the County of Hertfordshire on 29 August 1967. She went on to serve as a Government whip in the House of Lords between 1969 and 1970, and as Opposition Deputy Chief Whip from 1972. In 1973 she was elected Chief Whip, becoming the first woman to take charge of a whip's office in either house. On the return of the Labour Party to government in 1974 she became Captain of the Gentlemen-at-Arms (Government Chief Whip). In 1975, she became a Privy Counsellor. From 1979 to 1982 she was once again Opposition Chief Whip. From 1982 to 1987, she was Principal Deputy Chairman of Committees in the House of Lords, an office carrying with it the role of Chairman of the European Communities Committee.

== Death ==
She died on 6 November 1997, aged 82, in Colchester, at the home of former Conservative minister Lord Alport, who nursed her during the final years of her life. They sought solace in each other following the death of their partners, which developed into a love affair. They kept their relationship secret because she feared it would damage him politically, and she declined to marry him. Shortly after her death Alport met academic Mark Garnett, who was working for Sir Edward Heath on his memoirs, and he asked him to write his life story. Speaking to The Guardian, Garnett said of the meeting: "He was wearing a black tie and he mentioned the recent death of a 'close friend'. ... It was only later that I realised that the light had gone out in his life."

Political offices
Preceded by The Earl St Aldwyn	Chief Whip of the House of Lords; 1974–1979	Succeeded by The Lord Denham
Preceded by The Earl St Aldwyn	Captain of the Honourable Corps of Gentlemen-at-Arms; 1974–1979	Succeeded by The Lord Denham
