= Currock Hill =

Hill in northern England

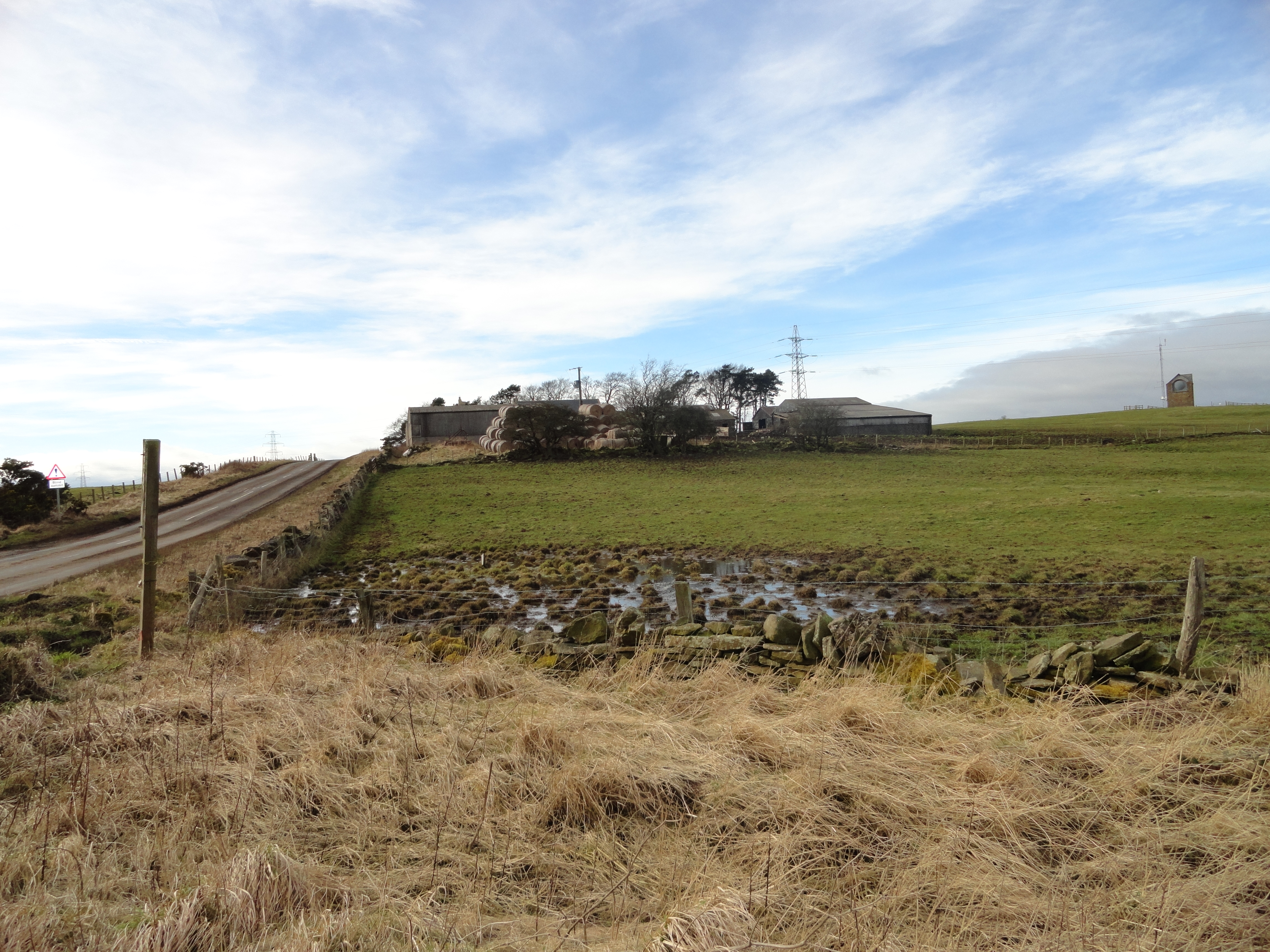
- Currock Hill Farm

Highest point
- Elevation: 259 m (850 ft)
- Listing: County Top
- Coordinates: 54°55′39″N 1°50′03″W

Geography
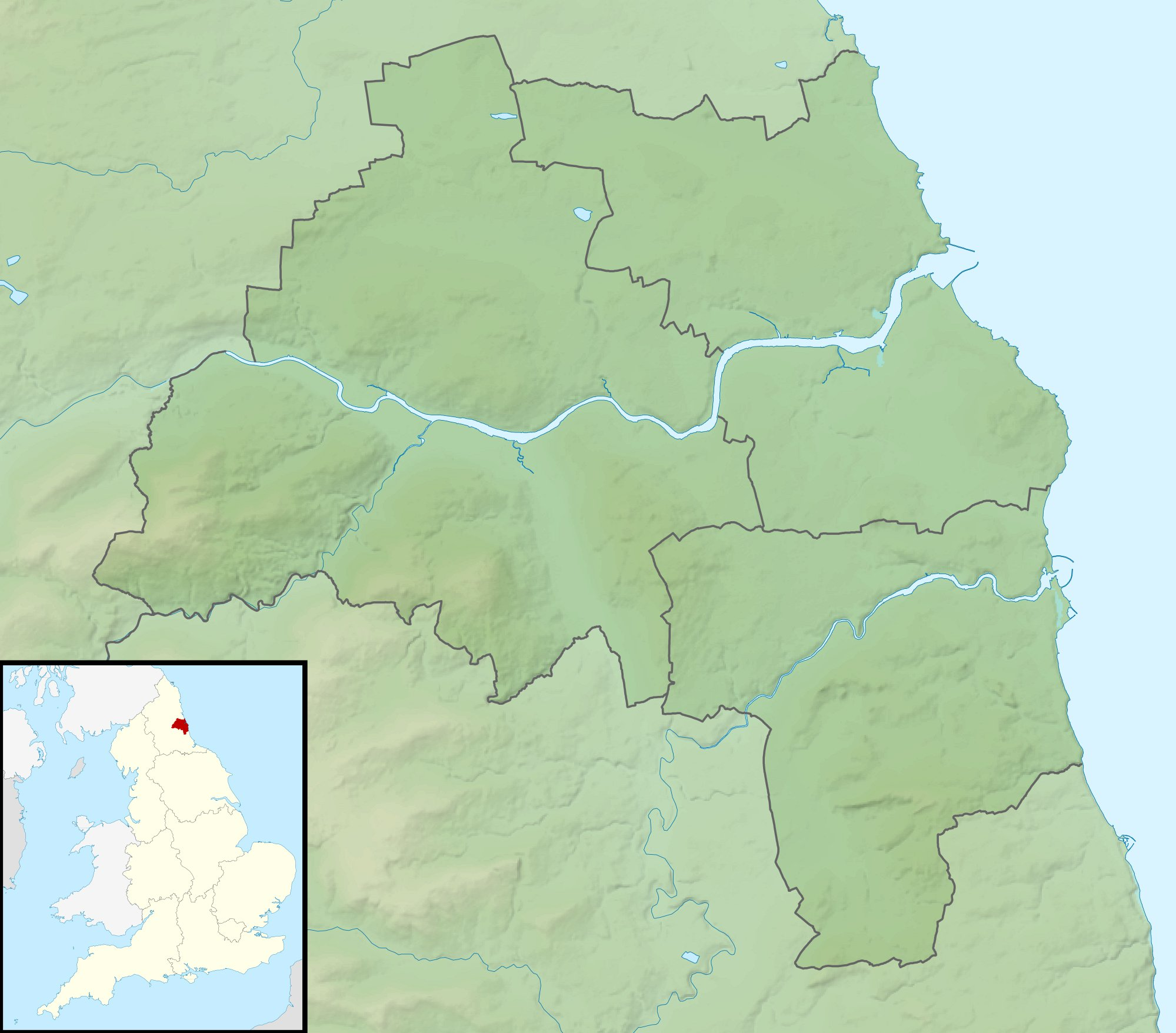
- Location within Tyne and Wear
- Location: Chopwell and Hedley on the Hill, England
- OS grid: NZ 10717 59214
- Topo map: OS Landranger 88

Currock Hill is a hill on the border between Northumberland and Tyne and Wear, England. Although the summit itself lies entirely within Northumberland, the eastern top (at 259 m, or 850 ft) is the highest point in both Tyne and Wear and the metropolitan borough of Gateshead.

The name "currock" comes from a Celtic word for a cairn or a stack of stones, a development of the word for a rock, carroc, and is still widely used in the North East.

== Geography ==
It is situated between the villages of Chopwell and Hedley on the Hill, on the border with Northumberland to the west of Newcastle upon Tyne. The hill forms part of the watershed divide between the catchments of the River Tyne to the north and the Derwent to the south.

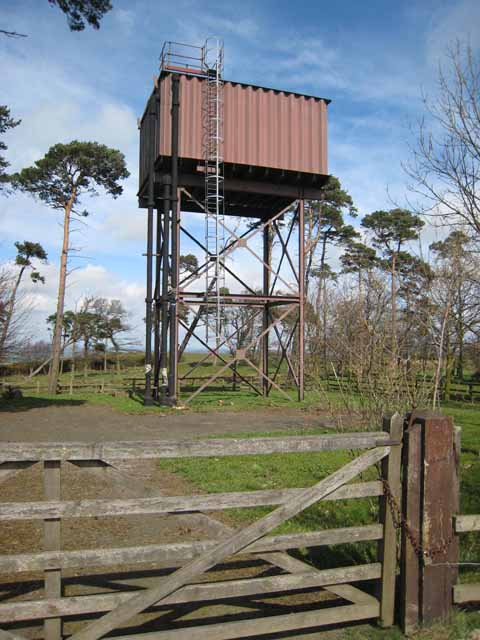
Currock Hill water tower (Northumberland summit)

The panorama from the hill is considered to have "commanding views towards the Pennines and Tyne Valley to the West, the Cheviot Hills to the North with Tyneside and North Sea Coast to the East." The county top itself is ambiguously situated on an arable feed directly south of the Lead Road.

== Flying ==
There has been a long association with flying on Currock Hill: during the First World War an area on the southern flank of the hill was designated as a relief airfield or landing ground for No.36 Squadron of the Royal Flying Corps, which was based at Cramlington. It was a Home Defence squadron, and patrolled the coastal area around Newcastle to prevent attacks by German Zeppelins.

More recently, the northern part of the hill has been used as the location for the Northumbria Gliding Club. The club has a variety of aircraft including three dual seat gliders, a single seat Astir CS77 and two Aeropro Eurofox tug planes, all of which use the grass runway at the site.

== See also ==
List of English counties by highest point
