= Beacon Hill, Norfolk =

Highest point in the English county of Norfolk

Beacon Hill
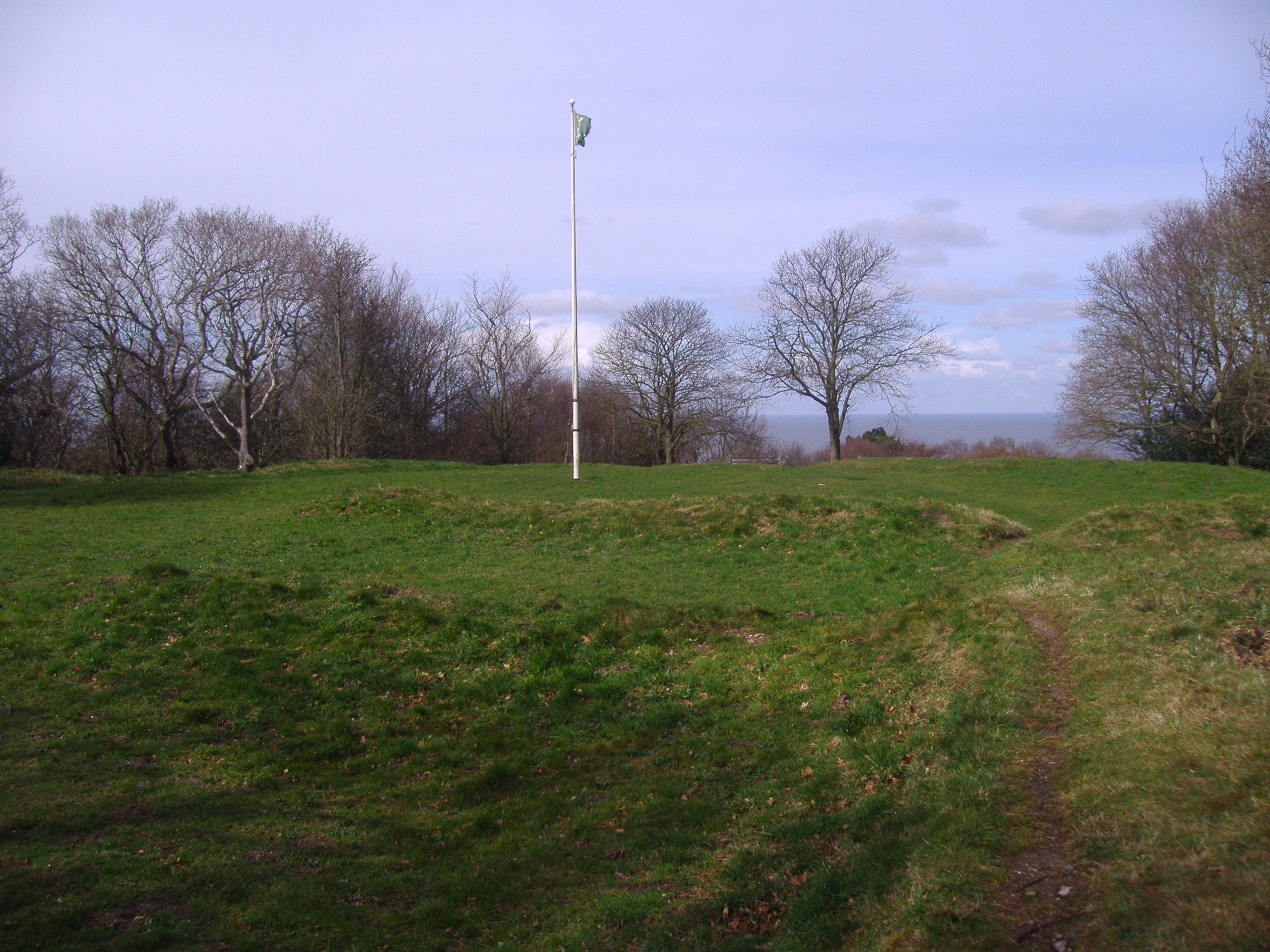
- The summit of Beacon Hill

Highest point
- Elevation: 105 m (344 ft)
- Prominence: 79 m (259 ft)
- Listing: County top
- Coordinates: 52°55′30″N 1°15′05″E

Geography
- Location within Norfolk
- Location: Norfolk, England
- Parent range: Cromer Ridge
- OS grid: TG186413
- Topo map: OS Explorer 25

Geology
- Mountain type: Prominent hill

Climbing
- Easiest route: Sandy Lane

Beacon Hill is the highest point in the English county of Norfolk. The hill is located 0.75 miles (1.2 km) south of the village of West Runton on the North Norfolk coast. At its summit the hill is 105 metres (344 ft) above sea level. The hill is also known as Roman Camp. The summit and surrounding woodlands are now in the care of the National Trust. A track, named Calves Well Lane, running west from Sandy Lane leads to a car park which is maintained by donations made to the National Trust collection box provide on the edge of the car park. Litter bins and benches make Beacon Hill an ideal location for picnics. There are several footpaths to follow across the area.

== Formation ==
Beacon Hill is a part of the Cromer Ridge which is a ridge of old glacial moraines (terminal moraine) that stands next to the coast above Cromer. The Cromer Ridge seems to have been the front line of the ice sheet for some time at the last glaciations, which is shown by the large size of the feature. All the material that was dredged up from the North Sea was deposited by the glaciers to form Beacon Hill and the rest of the ridge. The Ridge is the highest land of Norfolk and stretches for 9 miles (14 km) along the North Norfolk coast. It is characterized by its irregular, undulating, intimate and well-wooded topography and by substantial areas of heather in the west. Small, enclosed arable fields, hedge banks, sunken lanes such as Sandy Lane which leads up Beacon Hill are common characteristic features all along the ridge.

== Features ==
On the summit of Beacon Hill there is an earthwork enclosure. This area is known as Roman camp, a name which it is believed was coined around the turn of the 19th century by local horse drawn cab drivers as a means to make this place more appealing for tourists using the already existing earthworks to justify this 'assertion'. Despite its name there is no evidence of any Roman occupation on this site. The earthworks, or enclosure, was once a coastal signal station and probably of earlier beacons(s) although the exact location of this beacon(s) is not known. There have been several archeological excavations in this area but none of these have specifically investigated the earthworks at Beacon Hill. There are reports of a watch being kept at this site in 1324, so it's very probable that some kind of Beacon existed around this time. Historians believe there would have been a Beacon here around the time of the Spanish Armada in 1588 and certainly one in 1608 when there are records of repairs. There are records from the Norfolk Quarter Sessions of money being raised in the 1650s and 1660s to maintain a Beacon here and to ensure a watch was still being kept. This would have been during the time of the Dutch invasions. According to Faden's 1797 map of Norfolk this hill is described as The Old Beacon or Watch Tower which suggests it was no longer in use at this time. Although the exact location of these Beacons on the ridge are not known, this site would appear to be the most likely place for such outposts. Maps from the 18th century have the site marked as a rounded enclosure ‘termed’ as the old Beacon and watch tower. The Ordnance Survey map of 1838 calls the site a Signal Station and calls it Black Beacon Hill. It is understood the banks located here today are the remains of a signal station built during the time of the Napoleonic Wars and was part of a chain of signals stretching from Devon and as far north as Edinburgh. The signal sites from Norfolk downwards were abandoned from November 1841.
