= Dunstable and Whipsnade Downs =

UK Site of Special Scientific Interest

Coordinates: 51.869°N 0.54°W

- Site of Special Scientific Interest
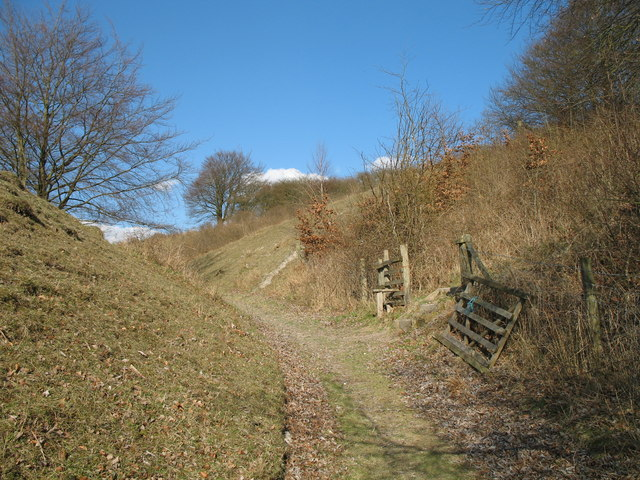
- Location of Dunstable and Whipsnade Downs.
- Area of search: Bedfordshire
- Grid reference: TL006199 SP 998187
- Interest: Biological
- Area: 73.4 ha (181 acres)
- Notification date: 1985
- Location map: Magic Map

Dunstable and Whipsnade Downs is a 73.4-hectare (181-acre) Site of Special Scientific Interest in Dunstable in Bedfordshire. It was notified in 1987 under Section 28 of the Wildlife and Countryside Act 1981, and the local planning authority is Central Bedfordshire Council. It is in the Chilterns Area of Outstanding Natural Beauty, and part of it is owned by the National Trust.

Dunstable Downs is the highest point in the east of England, and it has five thousand year old burial mounds and a medieval rabbit warren. The site is a 3 kilometre long steep escarpment between Dunstable and Whipsnade. The slopes have a typical chalk downland flora, and there are also habitats of scrub and tall herbs. The site is also important for butterflies.

There is access from the Chilterns Gateway Centre on Whipsnade Road.
