= Cromer Ridge =

Glacial moraines that stand next to the coast adjacent to Cromer, Norfolk, England

Cromer Ridge is a ridge of old glacial moraines (terminal moraine) that stands next to the coast adjacent to Cromer, Norfolk, England. Cromer Ridge seems to have been the front line of the ice sheet for some time at the last glaciation, which is shown by the large size of the feature. All the material that was dredged up from the North Sea was poured out of the glaciers to form a ridge.

Located on the North Norfolk coast, Cromer Ridge is among the highest land of East Anglia reaching 335 feet (102 m), and is 8.7 miles (14.0 km) long. It is characterised by its irregular, undulating, intimate and well-wooded topography and by substantial areas of heather in the west. Small, enclosed arable fields, hedgebanks, sunken lanes and sparse settlement are also characteristic features of the ridge. The crumbling cliffs at the coast are of glacial sands and gravels with some chalk exposures.

Cromer Ridge was formed during the Anglian glaciation around 450,000 years ago.

== See also ==
- Cromerian Stage
