= Pavis Wood =

Hill and woodland in Hertfordshire, England

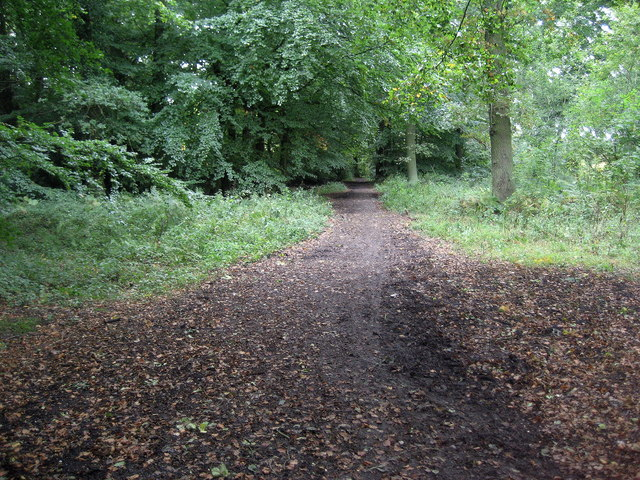
- Pavis Wood

Highest point
- Elevation: 248 m (814 ft)
- Prominence: c. 5 m
- Listing: County top
- Coordinates: 51°46′20″N 0°40′52″W

Geography
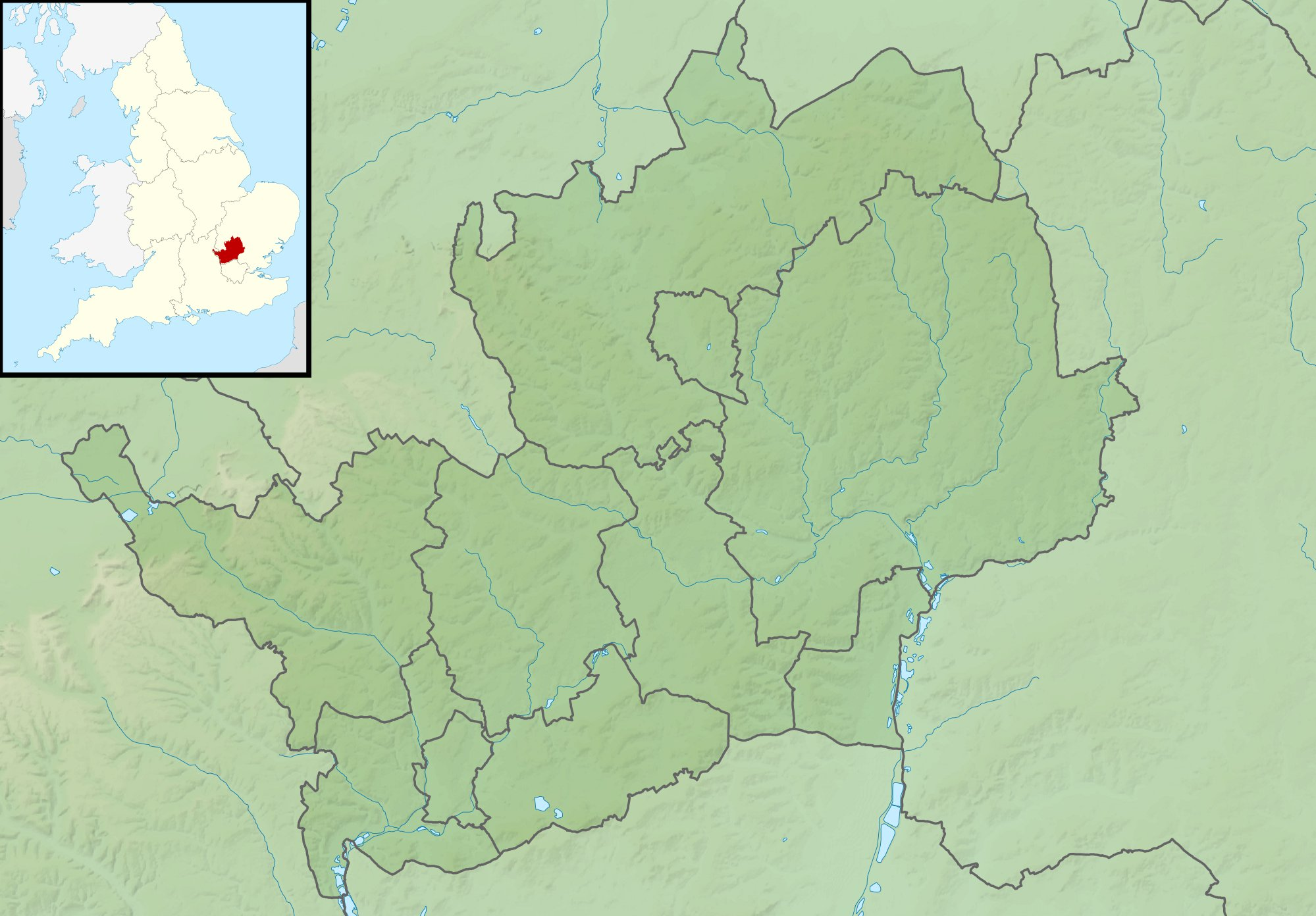
- Location within Hertfordshire
- Location: Hertfordshire, England
- OS grid: SP911090
- Topo map: OS Landranger 165

Pavis Wood is an area of woodland on a hill located near Hastoe in Tring, north-western Hertfordshire, England. A point on its eastern slopes is the highest point in the county of Hertfordshire at 244 m (801 ft). The area is often considered as ancient woodland containing a wide variety of plants such as the yellow pimpernel and wood melick. A bridleway crosses the woodland which can be accessed throughout the year as well as the Ridgeway National Trail which is dominated mainly by beech, oak and ash.

The summit plateau lies less than 4.8 kilometres (3 mi) from the border of Buckinghamshire and part of the Aylesbury Vale which contains the Buckinghamshire county top Haddington Hill 267 metres (876 ft). It is linked to Haddington Hill by a high ridge which gives this hill a mere 5 metres (16 ft) of relative height.

The summit area is unmarked and is difficult to determine, as is Haddington Hill's summit in Wendover Woods.
