= Great Wood Hill =

Highest point in the county of Suffolk, England

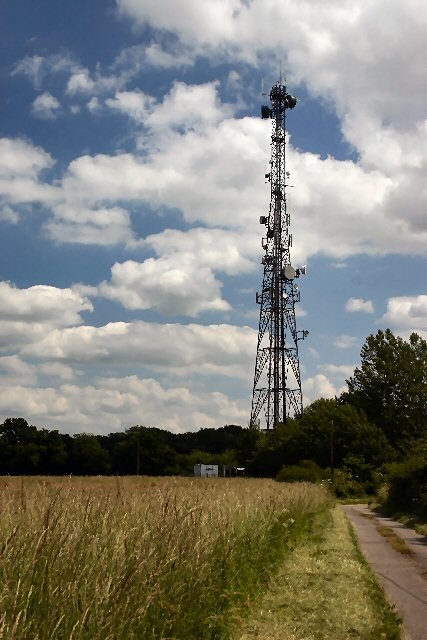
- Communications mast at Great Wood Hill

Highest point
- Elevation: 136 m (446 ft)
- Prominence: c. 42 metres (138 ft)
- Parent peak: Therfield Hill
- Listing: County Top
- Coordinates: 52°10′17″N 0°36′42″E

Geography
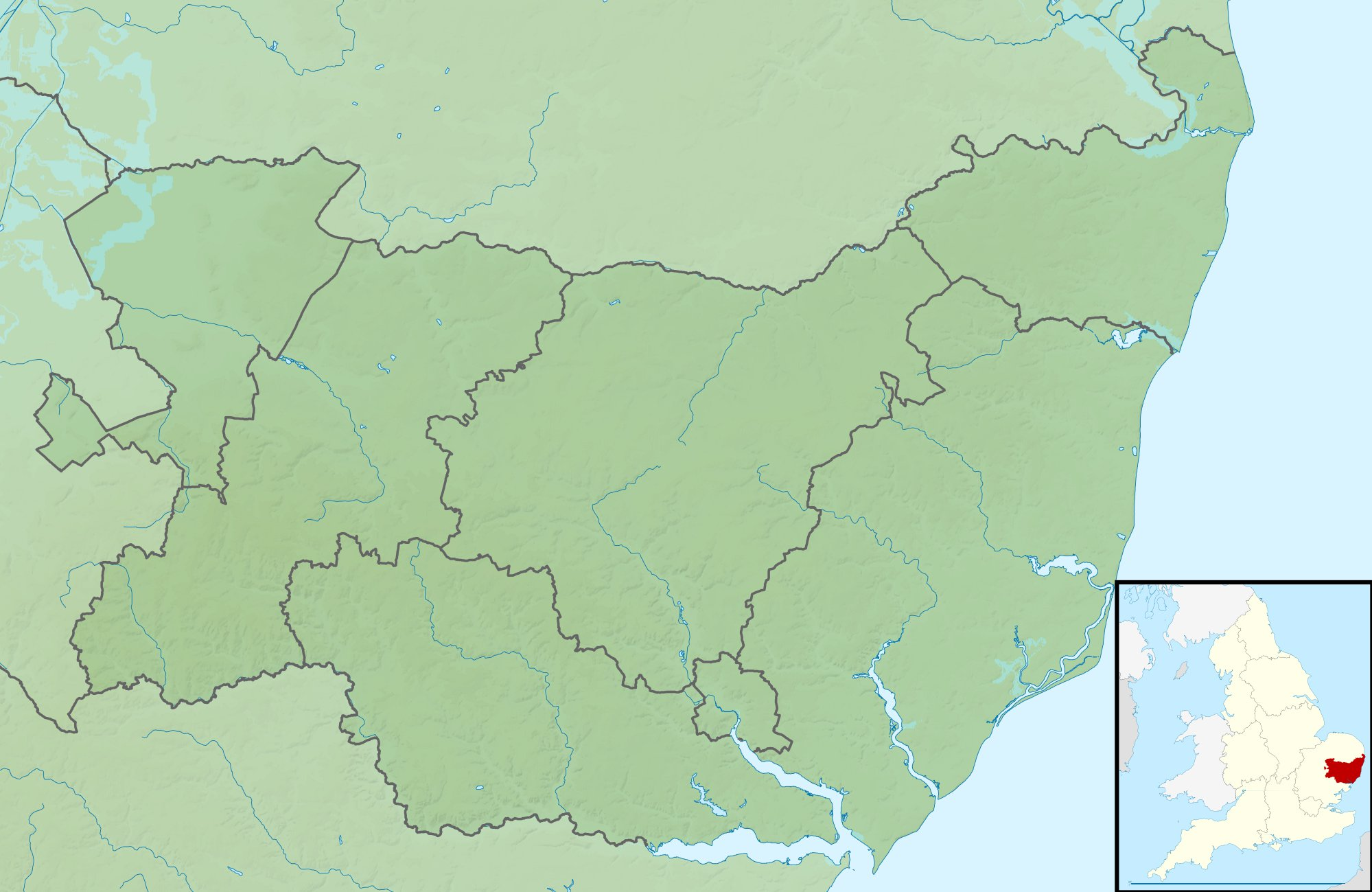
- Location within Suffolk
- Location: Newmarket Ridge, England
- OS grid: TL787558
- Topo map: OS Landranger 155

At 128 metres (420 ft), Great Wood Hill, in Depden, is the highest point in the English county of Suffolk. It is the highest part of the Newmarket Ridge.

It is the highest point in the wide area east of the River Cam.
