= Black Hill (Peak District) =

Hill in Derbyshire and West Yorkshire, England

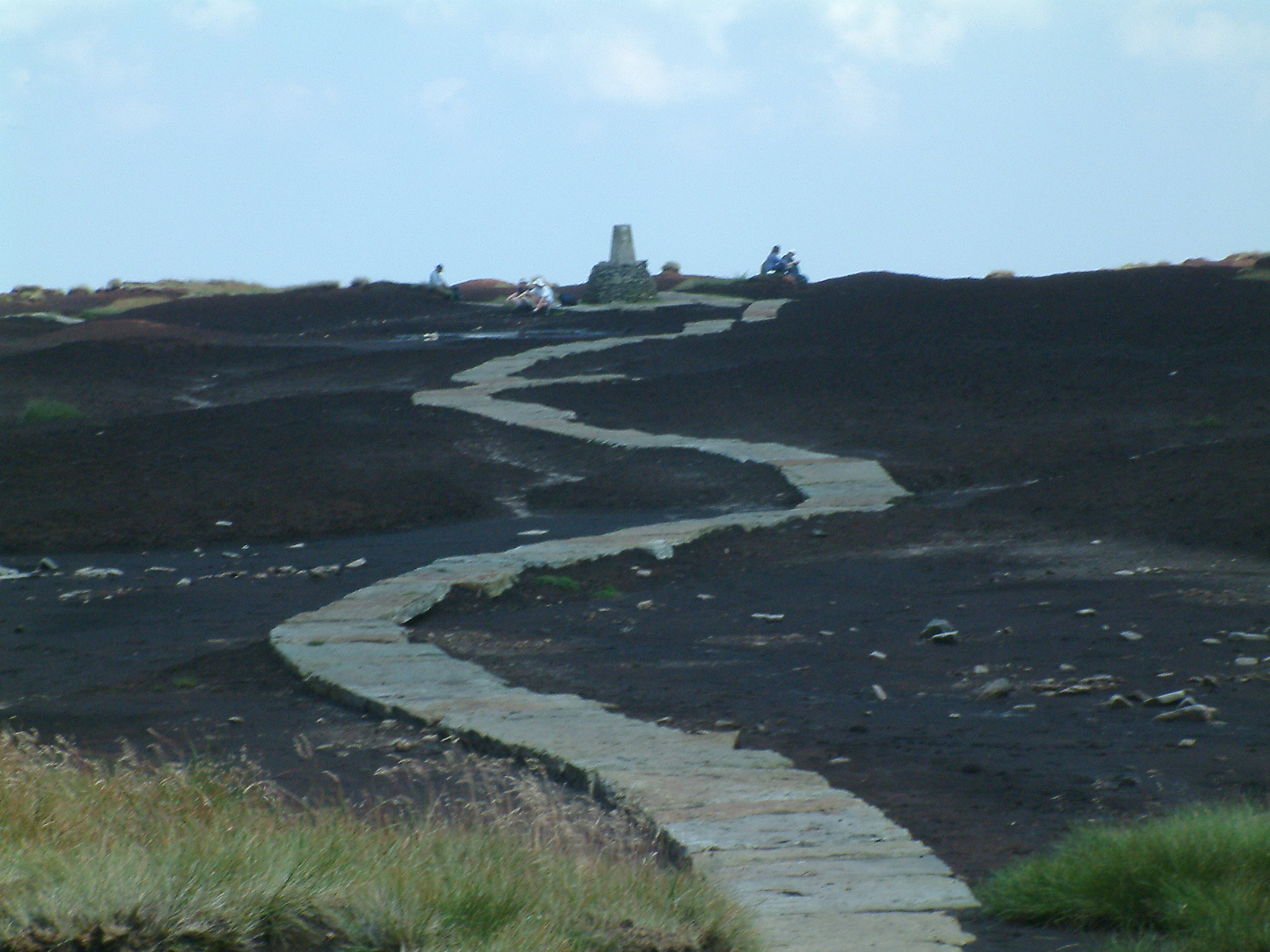
- The Pennine Way on the summit of Black Hill

Highest point
- Elevation: 582 m (1,909 ft)
- Prominence: 165 m (541 ft)
- Parent peak: Kinder Scout
- Listing: Marilyn, County Top, Dewey
- Coordinates: 53°32′18″N 1°52′53″W

Geography
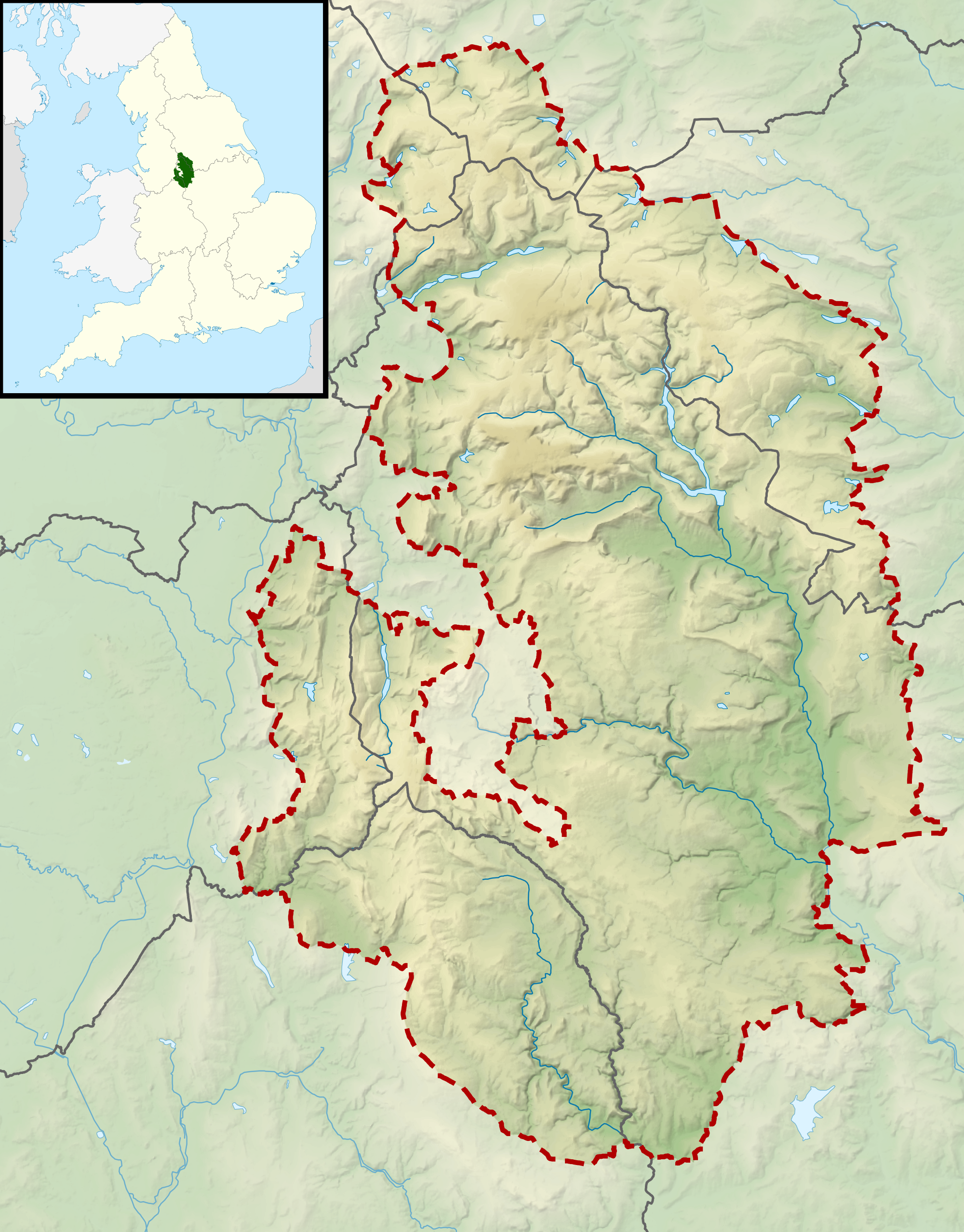
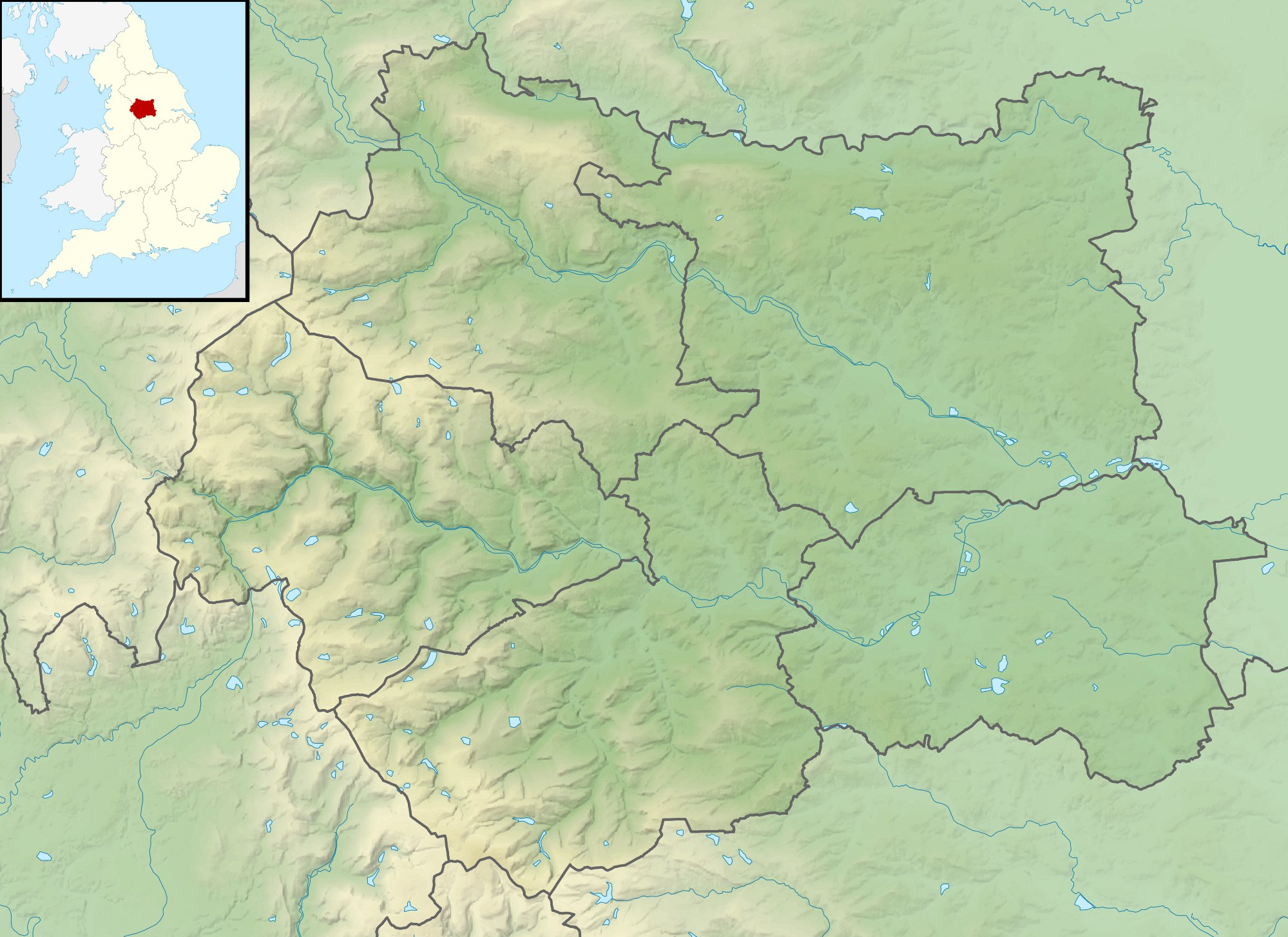
- Location within the Peak District Location within West Yorkshire Location within Derbyshire
- Location: Derbyshire/West Yorkshire (historic Cheshire), England
- Parent range: Peak District
- OS grid: SE 078 046
- Topo map: OS Landranger 110

Black Hill, in the Peak District, is the highest hill in West Yorkshire, England. Its summit rises to an elevation of 582 m (1,909 ft) above sea level. It is surpassed in height by only two other major summits in the Peak District (Kinder Scout and Bleaklow).

Black Hill is a typical Pennine moorland mountain, with a very flat and extensive plateau (but steeper sides). The top is peaty, poorly drained, and thus very boggy after rain. The area surrounding the summit itself had virtually no vegetation and was very dark, giving the hill an appropriate name. However, recent restoration work has eliminated much of the exposed peat. Black Hill is crossed by the Pennine Way whose now-paved surface allows walkers to reach the top dry-shod even in the wettest of weather.

Black Hill was the highest point (county top) of the historic county of Cheshire, lying at the tip of what was once known as the Cheshire Panhandle, a long projection of the county which lay to the north of the reservoir filled valley of Longdendale. Under the local government reforms which were enacted in 1974, Black Hill was placed for administrative purposes on the border between the boroughs of Kirklees in West Yorkshire and High Peak in Derbyshire. It is also the highest point within a metropolitan county in the United Kingdom.

== Routes ==
The Hill can be visited by a number of routes, including along the Pennine Way from Crowden via the Laddow Rocks cliffs; bogs permitting, a return can be made over Westend Moss (the pre-1966 route of the Pennine Way) to create a circular walk. Another popular approach is from the junction of the A635 and the Wessenden Head Road (to Meltham), known locally as the 'Isle of Skye' (after a former hotel). This provides access to a paved section of the Pennine Way southwards to Black Hill. Black Hill can also be reached easily from Holme Moss via access land, but this route requires the use of map and compass, as although the ground is level, it becomes trackless and confusing in places.

South of Crowden, the Pennine Way next visits Bleaklow and Kinder Scout (both of which are slightly higher, just over 2,000 feet (610 m), and so are Hewitts).

The triangulation column ("trig point") and highest point on Black Hill (and the highest point in West Yorkshire) is on a small elevated mound, called Soldiers' Lump. According to Wainwright the support timbers for the Ramsden theodolite, used by the Royal Engineers in the original Ordnance Survey which began in 1784, were still to be found here many years later.

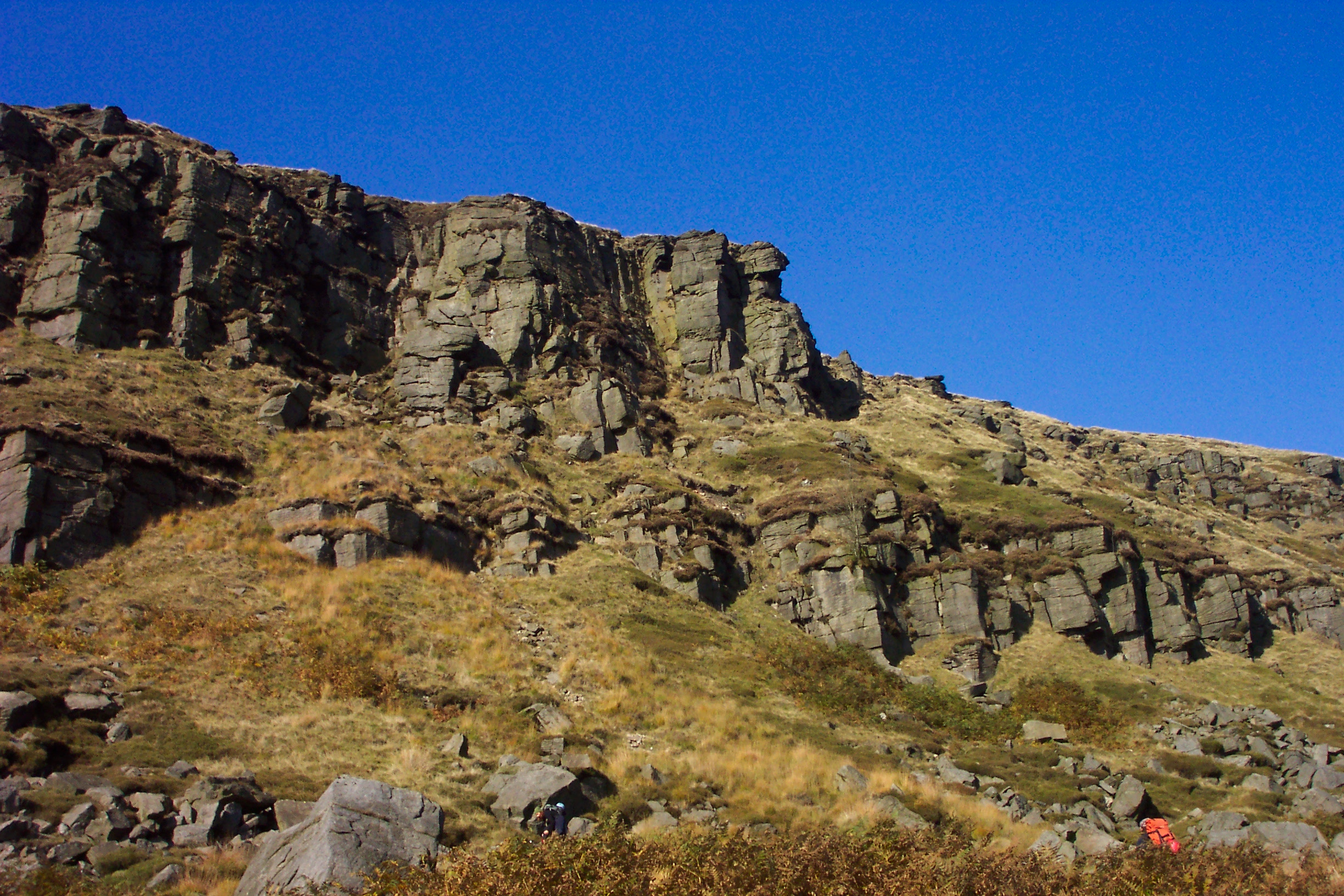
Laddow rocks

== See also ==
- Holme Moss
