= Coombe Hill, Buckinghamshire =

Hill in Buckinghamshire, England

Coombe Hill
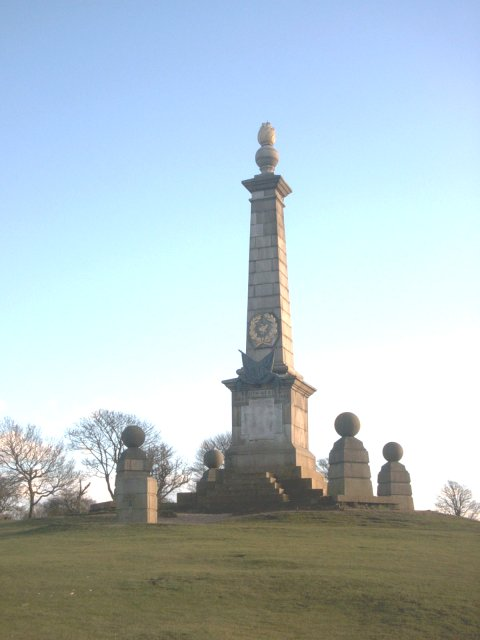
- The monument on Coombe Hill

Highest point
- Elevation: 260 m (850 ft)
- Coordinates: 51°45′09″N 0°46′17″W

Geography
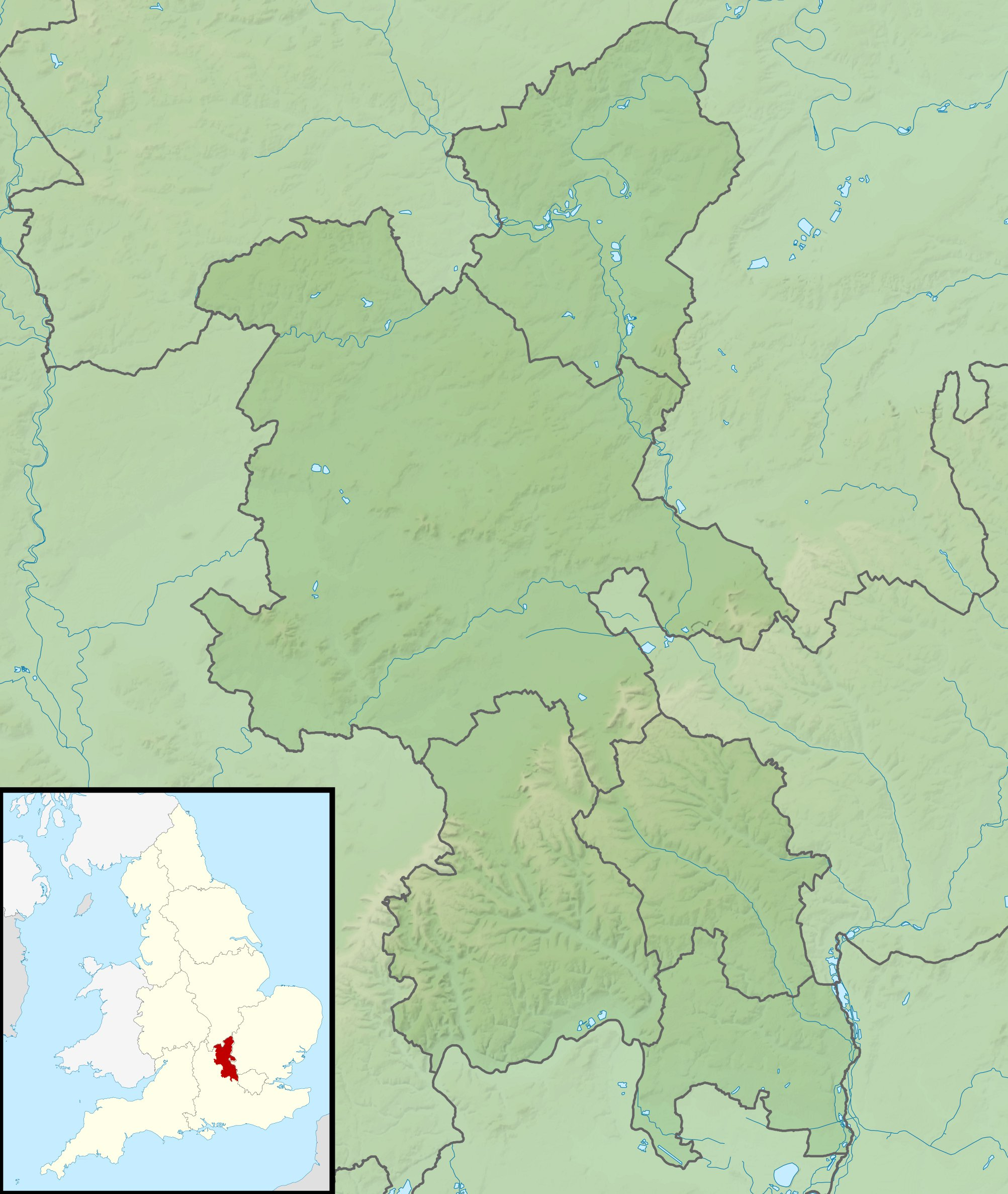
- Location within Buckinghamshire
- Location: Chiltern Hills, England
- OS grid: SP849067
- Topo map: OS Landranger 165

Coombe Hill is a hill in The Chilterns, located next to the hamlet of Dunsmore, Buckinghamshire, England, near the small town of Wendover, and overlooking Aylesbury Vale. It is not to be confused with another Coombe Hill on the flank of Haddington Hill, some two miles (3.2 km) to the north-east. It is part of the Bacombe and Coombe Hills Site of Special Scientific Interest.

The majority of the hill (an area of 106 acres (43 ha)) once formed part of the Chequers Estate but was presented to the National Trust by the British government when they were given the Estate in the 1920s. The summit of the hill is 852 feet (260 m) above sea level.

== Coombe Hill Monument – Second Boer War ==
For most of human history, war memorials were erected to commemorate great victories; remembering the dead was a secondary concern. Coombe Hill Monument is one of the first and largest examples of a war memorial erected to honour the names of individual men who fell whilst fighting for their country. The monument is an iconic Buckinghamshire landmark and a Grade II listed monument. At 850 feet (260 m) above sea level, it sits on one of the highest and most striking spurs of the Chilterns, commanding a wide view of the Vale of Aylesbury. On a clear day, it can be seen from the Berkshire Downs and the Cotswolds to the west. The view overlooks Chequers, the country home of the Prime Minister.

The monument was erected in 1904, by public subscription, in memory of 148 men from Buckinghamshire who died during the Second Boer War. Coombe Hill Monument was almost totally destroyed by lightning in 1938 and was rebuilt in the same year. The original bronze plaque and decorations were stolen in 1972 and replaced with a stone plaque and iron flag. The new stone plaque was also inscribed with the additional names of nine men believed to have been missing on the original. The monument was again badly damaged by a lightning strike in the early 1990s and spent several months in repair. It is now equipped with conductors to prevent this from happening again. The monument and a few square metres of surrounding land are owned by Buckinghamshire County Council.

The monument is a Grade II a listed building designated in 1985.

== The 2010 restoration ==
On 21 October 2010, the monument was rededicated after substantial restoration work. The work was done by Buckinghamshire County Council with funds raised by the Coombe Hill Monument Appeal Committee. The committee consisted of: The Lord Lieutenant of Buckinghamshire, Sir Henry Aubrey Fletcher Bt JP (Patron); Major General Stuart Watson CBE (Chairman); Mark Bailey, Buckinghamshire County Council (Project Manager); Lt Col (Retd) Ingram Murray, Honorary Secretary of the Friends of the Oxfordshire and Buckinghamshire Light Infantry; Patricia Birchley, Elected Member, Chiltern Ridges; Johanna Sienkiewicz, local resident, Project Researcher; Chris Arnold, Ellesborough Parish Council; Pam Priestley, Elected Member Wycombe District Council; Paul Rogerson, Elected Member, Buckinghamshire County Council; and Neil Harris, The National Trust

A new plaque corrects spelling errors in the original and adds 2 names that were previously omitted. The memorial was deep-cleaned, weathered joints were replaced, fresh gold leaf has been applied to the finial, and the county crest and bronze flags above the plaque have been restored.

== Triangulation point and plaque ==
In front of the monument was a rectangular concrete pillar that was the trig point and topped with a metal plaque donated in 1988 that pointed to true north and to the following distant features: The Cotswolds (53 miles (85 km)), Brill Hill (13 miles (21 km)13 miles), Waddesdon Manor (10 miles (16 km)), Calvert Chimneys (15 miles (24 km)), Aylesbury Church (5 miles (8.0 km)), Mursley Water Tower (15 miles (24 km)), Wingrave Church (8 miles (13 km)), Leighton Buzzard (12 miles (19 km)), Mentmore (9 miles (14 km)), Edlesborough Church (11 miles (18 km)) and Ivinghoe Beacon (9 miles (14 km)).

The trig point and its toposcope were heavily damaged, bordering on being totally destroyed, by vandals in early October 2018.

== Flora and fauna ==
Coombe Hill has 3 different types of land including acid heathland, chalk grassland and deciduous woodland. It is home to much interesting wildlife — including red kites, yellowhammers and firecrests. It also holds the habitat to many rare plants such as heather, orchids and the Chiltern gentian. Due to its rarity the acid moorland is a Site of Special Scientific Interest (SSSI).

== Coombe Hill Run ==
A 7-kilometre (4.3 mi) running race organised by the Vale of Aylesbury Athletic Club which includes 190 metres (620 ft) of climbing up to the monument on Coombe Hill, the Coombe Hill Run is a rare example of a fell race in southern Britain. First held in 1973, and now held on the first Sunday in June, it attracts more than 150 runners.

== Origin of name ==
The word coombe is of Brythonic origin and means "hollow".
