= Grim's Ditch (Chilterns) =

Series of linear earthwork in the Chilterns

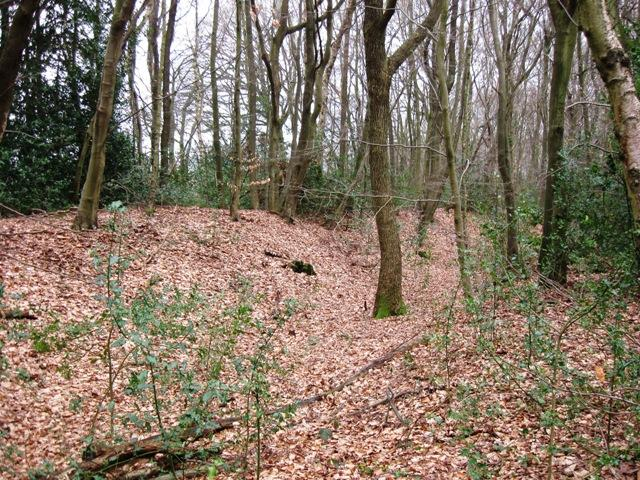
Grim's Ditch near Hastoe

Grim's Ditch is a series of linear earthwork in the Chilterns (southeast England). A complete outline cannot be identified but separate sections exist over a 30-kilometre (19 mi) span between Bradenham, Buckinghamshire, Berkhamsted, Hertfordshire and as far as Pitstone and Ivinghoe Buckinghamshire.

Pottery shards have been unearthed in excavations during the 1970s and 1980s suggesting that its origin may have been during the Iron Age and was believed to have been during a period when the landscape was clearer of scrub and the dense woodland than today as the straighter sections would have required clear lines of sight. The first mention of Grim's Ditch was a grant of 1170–90 in the Missenden Cartulary referring to it as Grimesdic. The Anglo-Saxons commonly named features of unexplained or mysterious origin Grim. The word derives from the Norse word grimr meaning devil and a nickname for Odin or Wodin the God of War and Magic. Another mention is to be found in a 10th-century Anglo-Saxon boundary charter for the Mongewell area.

Its size varies considerably. At Hastoe the ditch is 3.5 metres (11 ft) wide and 2 metres (6 ft 7 in) deep with a bank of 2 metres (6 ft 7 in) and an overall spread of 13.5 metres (44 ft). The purpose of the earthwork is uncertain. It is thought by the Ordnance Survey (1974) that it may be a set of local boundaries used to control the movement of cattle and carts and dating back to the Iron Age, as no Anglo-Saxon event is connected with it. It is not seen as having a defensive function due to the way that the banks have been constructed. It may in fact be a collection of structures with two or more purposes, with the hilltop section near Cholesbury being associated with the nearby Iron Age Hillfort whilst other sections lower down towards Aylesbury Vale may demarcate areas where pig and cattle grazing occurred. Sections are scheduled as ancient monuments.

== Route ==
Coordinates	Grid reference	nearby settlement
51.6719°N 0.7931°W	SU834977	Bradenham
51.6936°N 0.8084°W	SP823001	Lacey Green
51.7186°N 0.7875°W	SP837029	Whiteleaf
51.7120°N 0.7660°W	SP852022	Great Hampden
51.7195°N 0.7107°W	SP890031	Great Missenden
51.7500°N 0.7026°W	SP895065	The Lee
51.7712°N 0.6629°W	SP922089	Cholesbury
51.7762°N 0.6323°W	SP943095	Wigginton
51.7595°N 0.5864°W	SP975077	Berkhamsted
51.7707°N 0.5469°W	TL002090	Berkhamsted
51.7658°N 0.5138°W	TL025085	Potten End

== Planned High Speed 2 works ==
In July 2024, Buckinghamshire Council announced that it had given consent for approximately 75 metres (246 ft) of the earthworks near Great Missenden to be excavated as part of the construction works for the High Speed 2 railway line. The planned works had originally involved removing 150 metres (490 ft) of Grim's Ditch. A spokesman stated that the council "bitterly regrets that damage will be done to any part of this ancient monument."
