= Great Chishill =

Village in Cambridgeshire, England

Coordinates: 52°01′59″N 0°04′01″E

- Village
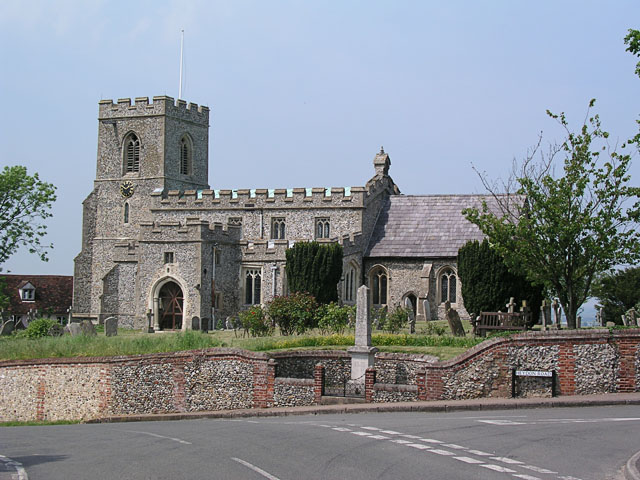
- St Swithun's parish church

- Location within Cambridgeshire
- Population: 678 (2011 Census) (parish, including Little Chishill)
- OS grid reference: TL427386
- Civil parish: Great and Little Chishill
- District: South Cambridgeshire
- Shire county: Cambridgeshire
- Region: East
- Country: England
- Sovereign state: United Kingdom
- Post town: Royston
- Postcode district: SG8
- Dialling code: 01763
- Police: Cambridgeshire
- Fire: Cambridgeshire
- Ambulance: East of England
- UK Parliament: South Cambridgeshire
- Website: Great & Little Chishill

Great Chishill is a village and former civil parish, now in the parish of Great and Little Chishill, in the South Cambridgeshire district, in the county of Cambridgeshire, England. The village is about 1 mile (1.6 km) east of the county boundary with Hertfordshire and about 4 miles (6 km) east of Royston.

The parish was part of Essex until 1895, when the county boundary was revised. On 26 January 1929 the parish was renamed from "Great Chishall" to "Great Chishill". On 1 April 1968 the parish was abolished to form "Great and Little Chishill".

The highest point of the current administrative county of Cambridgeshire, 146 m (479 ft) above sea level, is about 1/2 mile (800 m) east of St Swithun's parish church. However, as Great Chishill was historically a part of Essex (having been moved in boundary changes in 1895), the historic county top of Cambridgeshire is about 13 miles (21 km) to the east of Great Chishill close to the village of Castle Camps where a point on the disused RAF airfield reaches a height of 128 metres (420 ft) above sea level (grid reference TL 63282 41881).

The highest point of Essex, Chrishall Common and the triple point of Cambridgeshire, Essex and Hertfordshire are near each other about 1.2 miles (2 km) south of Great Chishill.

== Population ==
In 1961 the parish had a population of 293. The 1991 Census recorded 237 dwellings and a population of 634 in Great and Little Chishill parish. The 2011 Census recorded Great and Little Chishill's population as 678. Based on 2021 census data, the population for Great Chishill only was 622, in 266 households.

== Toponym and manors ==
The place-name "Chishill" or "Chishall" is derived from the Old English Cishella, meaning "gravelly hill".

The Domesday Book of 1086 records that in the reign of Edward the Confessor Ulfeih, a freeman, had held Cishella and Sired, a freeman, had held Little Cishella. William the Conqueror granted Cishella to Henry de Farers and Little Cishella to Count Eustace of Boulogne.

Great Chishill was divided into five manors, the Manor of Cardens, alias Bassets Hall, the Manor of Belknaps, the Manor of Tewes alias Lisles, the Manor of Friers alias Chishall-Grange and the Manor of Chishall alias Over Chishall-Hall. There is still a farmhouse, Hall Farm, on the latter site, on the east side of the village.

== Church and chapel ==
=== Church of England ===
The Church of England parish church of St Swithun was founded in 1136 by Geffrey de Magnaville under the Benedictine Walden Abbey. The first recorded vicar was Anselm De Flempton, 14 May 1327.

The church is built of flint with limestone and clunch dressings. The nave and part of the chancel are 13th-century. The nave has north and south aisles. The south arcade is of four bays and was built about 1275. The chancel was rebuilt about 1330. The north arcade is later, and is Perpendicular Gothic.

The lower part of the west tower was also 14th-century, and the upper part was 15th-century. But the tower collapsed in 1892 and was rebuilt in 1897. At the same time the nave and aisles were restored under the direction of the architect Francis Penrose.

In August 1892 the architect Alfred Hoare Powell cycled from Barrington to see the collapsed tower. He wrote home "The tower was all built of flints and had an iron band all round it which the vicar and churchwardens agreed in thinking very unslightly and so removed it!! with such consequences".

The west tower has a ring of five bells. William and Philip Wightman of London cast the treble, second, third and fourth bells in 1686. Thomas II Mears of the Whitechapel Bell Foundry cast the tenor bell in 1841. A new ringing floor was inserted in the tower in 2000.

The church is a Grade II* listed building.

St Swithun's parish is part of the Diocese of Chelmsford.

=== United Reformed ===
A Congregational chapel was established in 1694. On the 22 February 1789 a fire broke out in its vestry house in Barley Road and quickly spread throughout the village, destroying many houses and setting light to the tower of St Swithun's parish church. There were no deaths. The Congregational chapel was rebuilt 1894. It is now a United Reformed Church.

== Economic and social history ==
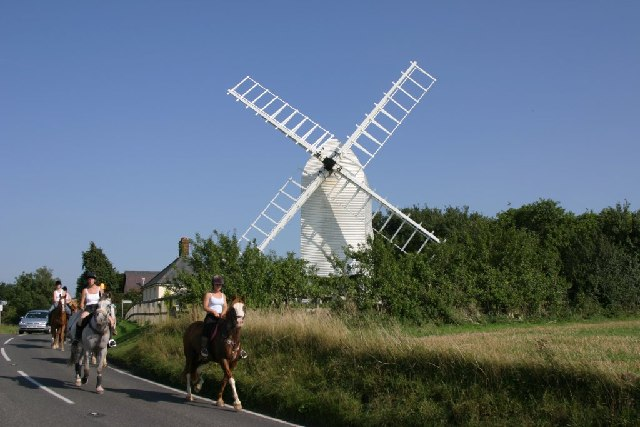
Chishill windmill

=== Windmill ===
Chishill windmill is about 1,100 yards (1 km) west of the village on the B1039 road to Barley. The first surviving record of a mill here is from 1592. The first recorded owners were the Cooke family and the first recorded miller was Joseph Rule in 1677. The last miller was William Pegram, who stopped working the mill in 1951.

The present windmill is a post mill, possibly rebuilt in 1819 with materials from a previous mill dating from 1726. A stud inside the mill is inscribed "1712". The main post was renewed in 1868 and patent sails were fitted about 1912. It is a Grade II* listed building.

In the 1960s Cambridgeshire County Council bought the mill, conserved it and opened to the public. After the Coalition government's 2010 spending review the council closed the windmill to the public. In February 2012 it transferred the freehold of the mill to the Great Chishill Windmill Trust, which planned to restore the mill and reopen it to the public. After seven years the restoration of the Mill was completed at a cost of £100,000; raised from donations and grants from both the Society for the Protection of Ancient Buildings and Historic England. The mill was formally opened on 8 June 2019 by pop star Sam Smith, who grew up in the village and worked at the local shop in Barley.

=== Trades and amenities ===
In 1886 Kelly's Directory of Essex recorded that the parish had bakers, butchers, wheelwrights, bricklayers, dressmakers, six farms in Great Chishill and one in Little Chishill, with their attendant labourers. There were two public houses: the White Horse and The Plough (now The Pheasant). There was a shop and post office and a parish school for 100 children. The shop closed in the late 1970s and the school on 2 April 1971.

The Pheasant pub is still trading. The village has a playing field and sports pavilion, and a village hall built in 1982. Two farms are still worked in Great Chishill and one in Little Chishill.

The Guinness Book of Records records that on 10 September 1983 Ben Palmer, a local farmer, and Owen North, the local baker, produced loaves of bread from the wheat in the field in 40 minutes 44 seconds.

== See also ==
- The Hundred Parishes

== Bibliography ==
- Drury, Michael (2000). Wandering Architects: In Pursuit of an Arts and Crafts Ideal. Stamford: Shaun Tyas. ISBN 190028913X.
- Ekwall, Eilert (1960) [1936]. Concise Oxford Dictionary of English Place-Names (4th ed.). Oxford: Oxford University Press. "Chishall". ISBN 0198691033.
- Pevsner, Nikolaus (1970) [1954]. Cambridgeshire. The Buildings of England. Harmondsworth: Penguin Books. p. 395. ISBN 0-14-071010-8.
