= Dunstable Downs =

Part of Chiltern Hills, England

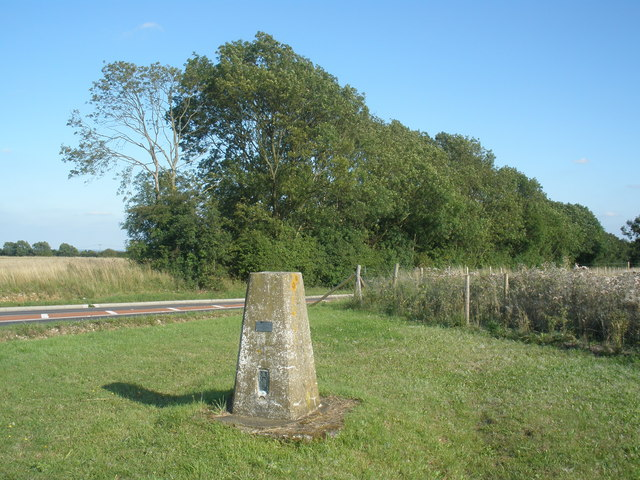

Highest point
- Elevation: 243 m (797 ft)
- Prominence: 105 m (344 ft)
- Parent peak: Haddington Hill
- Listing: County Top
- Coordinates: 51°51′51″N 0°32′11″W

Geography
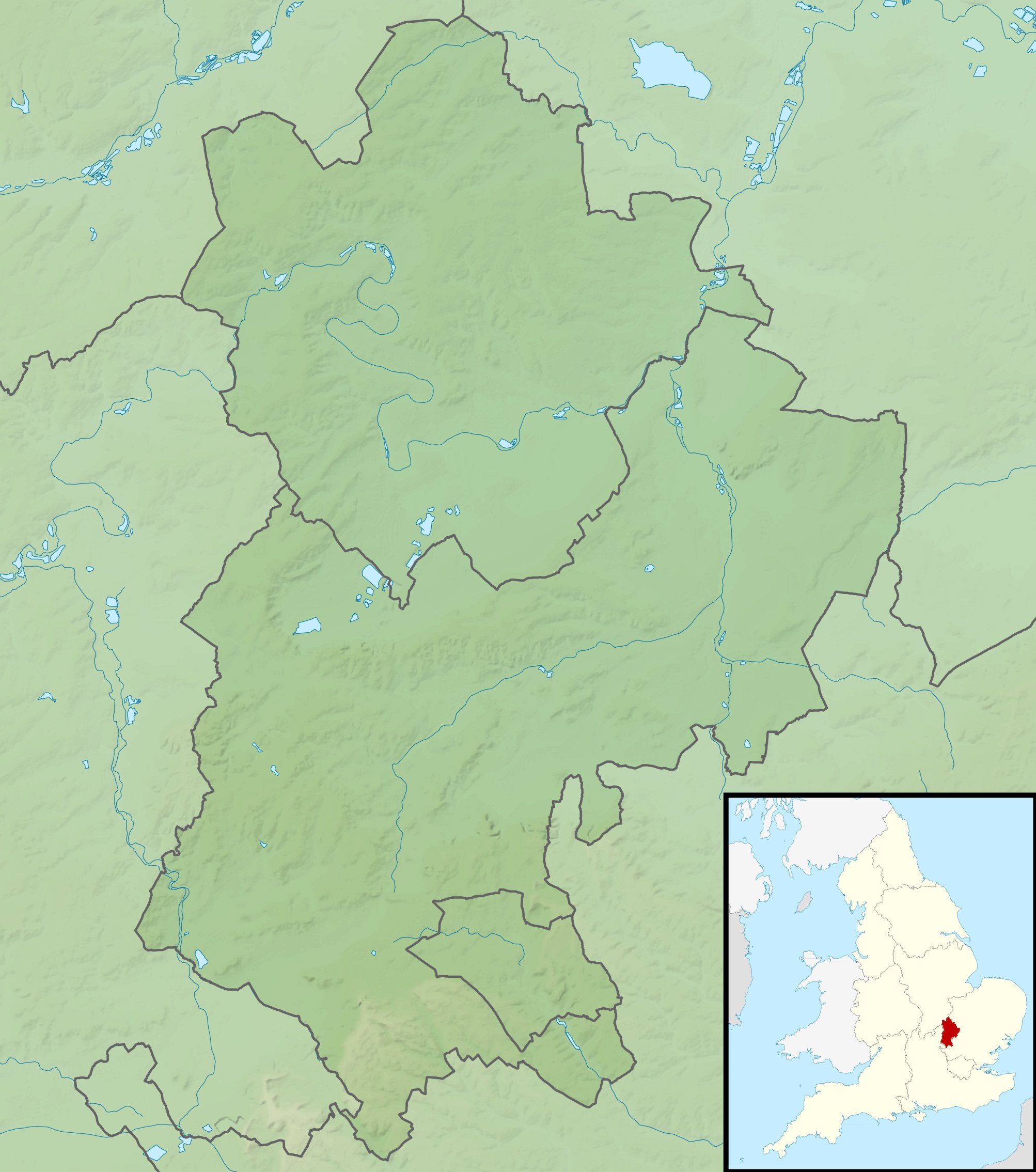
- Location within Bedfordshire
- Location: Chiltern Hills, England
- OS grid: TL008194
- Topo map: OS Landranger 166

Dunstable Downs are part of the Chiltern Hills, in southern Bedfordshire, England; and are located near (and named after) the town of Dunstable. They are a chalk escarpment forming the north-eastern reaches of the Chilterns. At 243 m (797 ft), Dunstable Downs are the highest point in the county of Bedfordshire.

Because of its elevation, Dunstable Downs hosted a station in the shutter telegraph chain which connected the Admiralty in London to its naval ships in the port of Great Yarmouth during the years 1808 to 1814.

Whipsnade Zoo has cut an enormous lion shape into the chalk on the side of one of the hills. The lion can be seen from the B489 (Aylesbury to Dunstable road).

The downs are used by gliders, kite fliers, hang gliders and paragliders in the area because of their height. The London Gliding Club is based at the foot of the downs.

Much of the downs is managed by the National Trust as part of the Dunstable Downs & Whipsnade Estate property.

== Ascents ==
Central Bedfordshire Council and the National Trust commissioned Archetype architects to build a visitor centre known as the Chilterns Gateway Centre, on the very top of Dunstable Downs. The summit is right next to the B4541 road that crosses the hill, and so an ascent of the hill requires nothing more than getting out of a car at the highest point and walking across to the trig point.

For those who wish to climb the hill from the base, it is possible to do a circular walk from the village of Whipsnade by following the Icknield Way Path and Chiltern Way, both of which are marked on Ordnance Survey maps. This circuit can be extended to take in the northern top of Five Knolls. The hill can also be ascended from Dunstable to the north. The Icknield Way Trail, a horse rider and off-road cycle route, has been established following a similar route to the Icknield Way Path which passes over the Dunstable Downs.

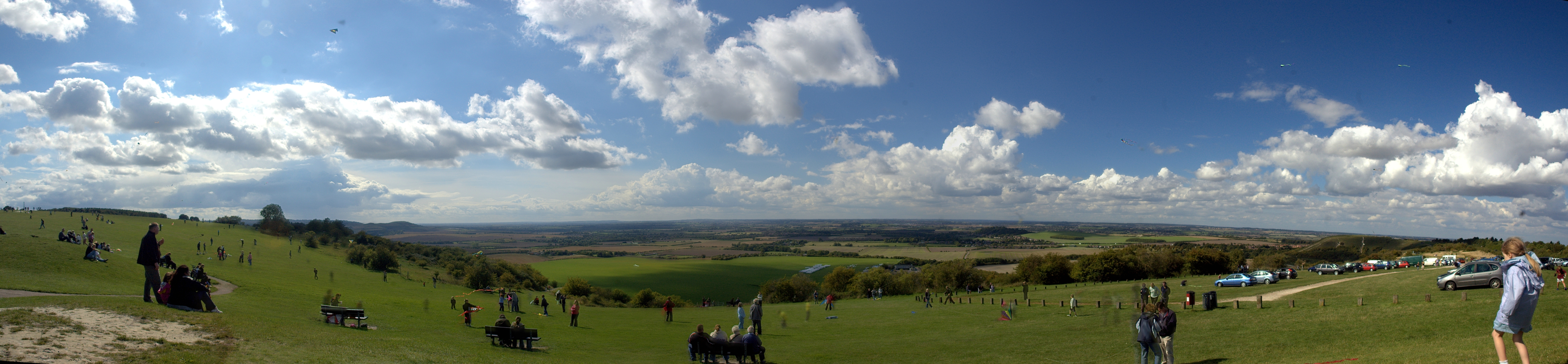
Dunstable Downs panorama

== Archaeological sites ==
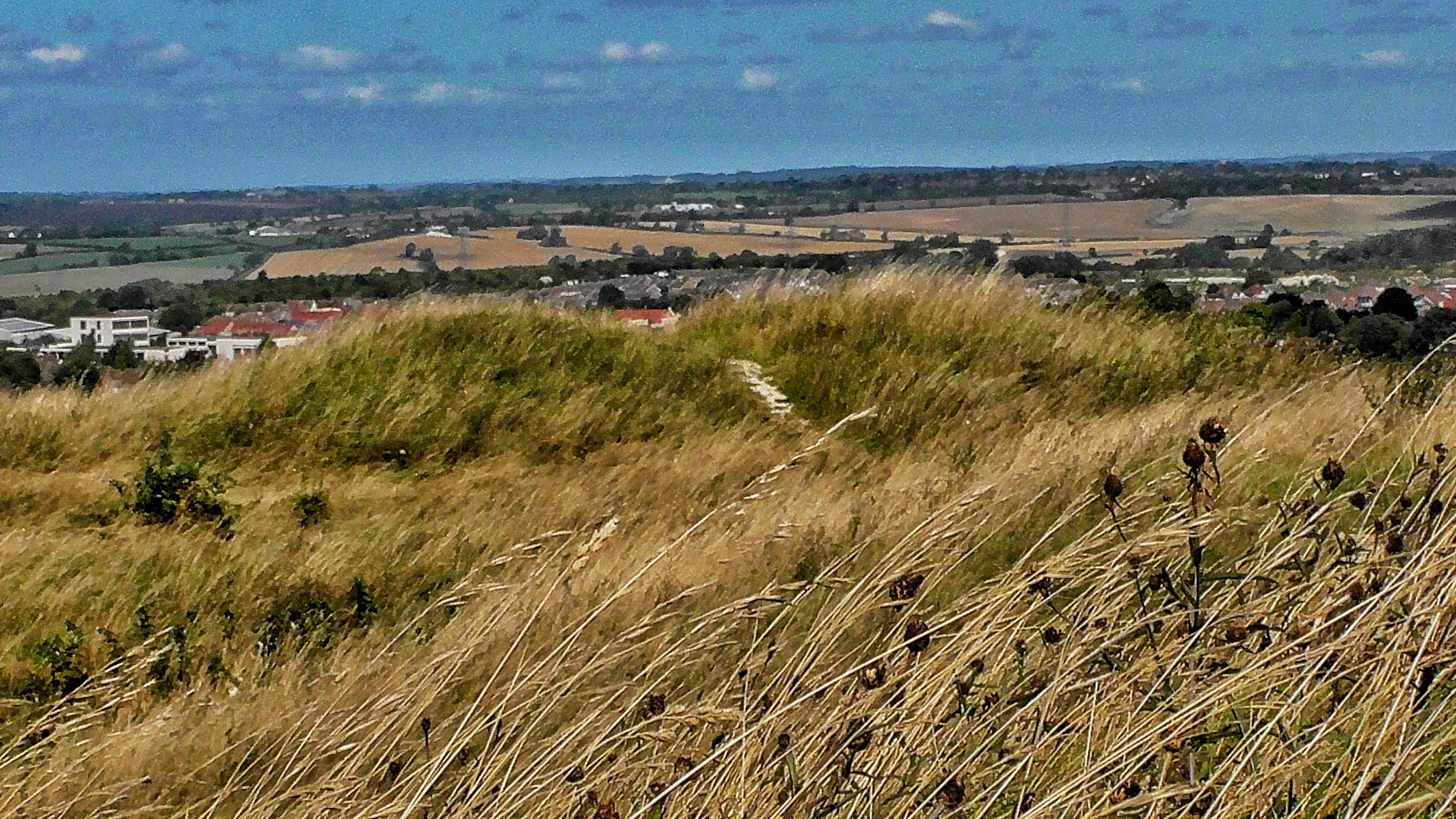
View of the Five Knolls Barrow Cemetery, looking north.

The Five Knolls Barrow Cemetery is located at the northern tip of the Dunstable Downs. First described by antiquarian William Stukeley in the 18th century, the site contained burials from the late Neolithic to Saxon eras prior to excavation. They include the "Five Knolls Woman", aged between 35 and 40 years, buried on her side with a flint knife. A mother and child, buried with a number of echinoid fossils were also found, dating approximately from the early Bronze Age. The site is also known for the deviant burial of executed Saxon criminals.

== Natural history ==
The downs are home to a wide variety of wildlife including many rare wild flowers, such as the bee orchid, and butterfly species, like the marbled white and the chalkhill blue.

Areas of the west-facing slope were notified in 1987 under the Wildlife and Countryside Act 1981 as a Site of Special Scientific Interest (SSSI) called Dunstable and Whipsnade Downs. Blow's Down is a continuation of the Dunstable Downs escarpment on the eastern side of Dunstable. It is also an SSSI and most of it is managed by the Wildlife Trust for Bedfordshire, Cambridgeshire and Northamptonshire (as Blow's Downs).

== See also ==
- Dunstable
- Geology of Hertfordshire
- Luton
