= Ebrington Hill =

Hill in Warwickshire, England

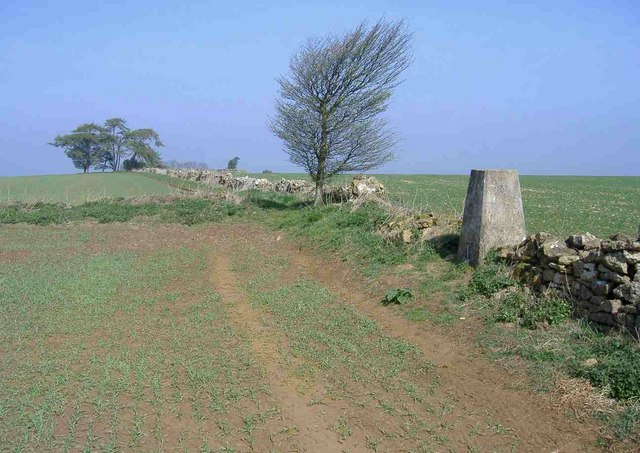
- Ebrington Hill

Highest point
- Elevation: 261 m (856 ft)
- Prominence: 111 m (364 ft)
- Listing: County Top
- Coordinates: 52°04′54″N 1°43′38″W

Geography
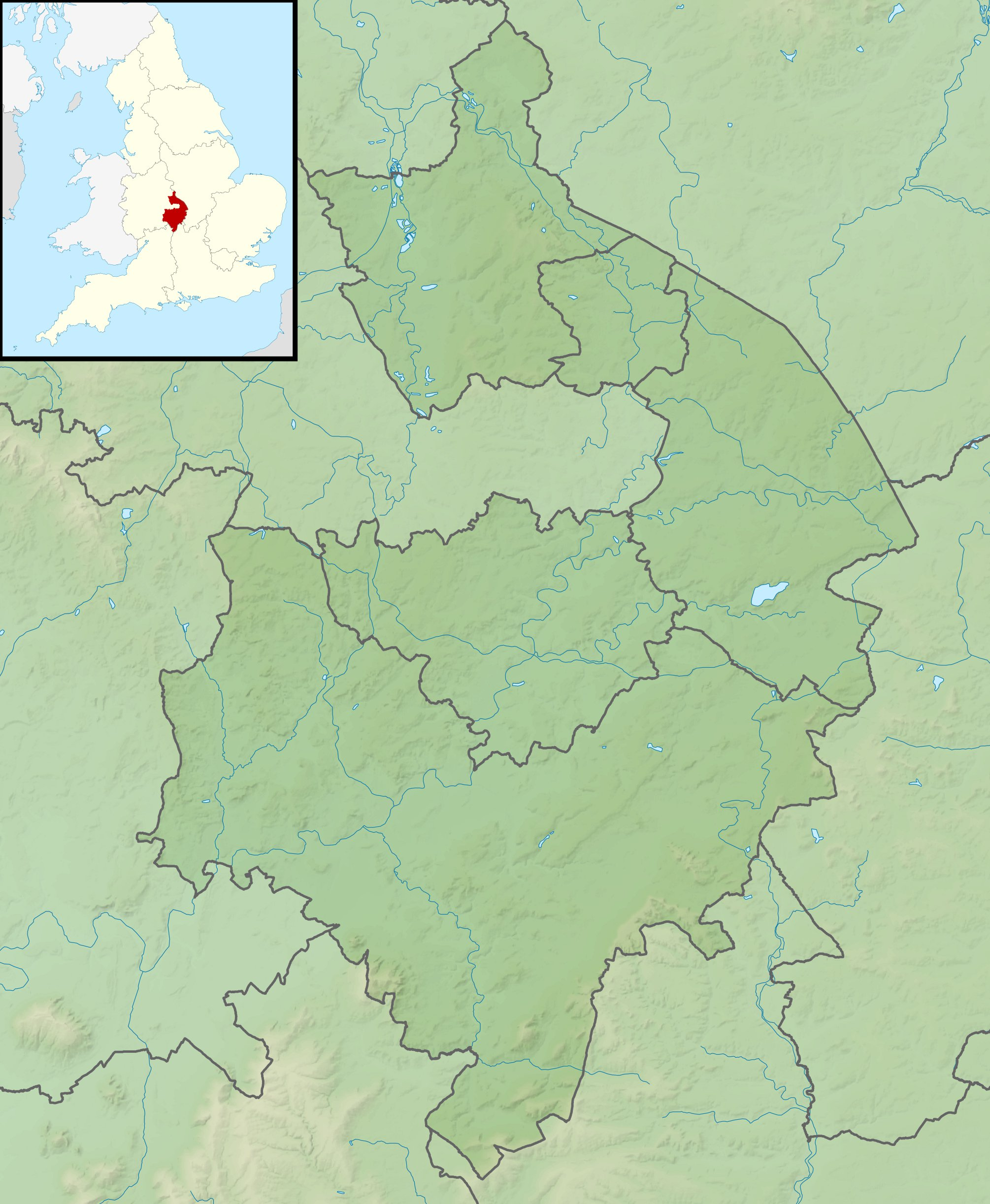
- Location within Warwickshire
- Location: Ebrington, England
- Parent range: Cotswolds
- OS grid: SP1878142634
- Topo map: OS Landranger 151

Ebrington Hill is a hill in Warwickshire, England, which at 261 m (856 ft) is the highest in the county. It is situated between the villages of Ebrington, Mickleton and Ilmington on the Warwickshire and Gloucestershire border in the Cotswolds.

The summit lies within the modern administrative boundaries of Warwickshire following boundary changes over the last century, but technically the summit was historically (just) over the border in Gloucestershire. The true historic county top of Warwickshire thus lies about 30m south of the summit on a track (grid reference SP 18778 42599, height 260 metres (850 ft)). The triangulation pillar at 259 metres (850 ft) is not the summit of the hill.
