= Strip parish =

Lincolnshire has many clearly visible strip parishes.

A strip parish is a parish with a narrow, elongated shape, formed typically during the Anglo-Saxon and early medieval period. The shape is influenced by landscape and political and economic factors. Evidence of such parishes can be found throughout England, although they seem to have been more common in a number of southern counties, particularly but not exclusively associated with locations including both lowland and upland landscapes or alternatively coastal communities.

== Origins of strip parishes ==
A number of common factors influenced the creation of strip parishes: the establishment of the parish unit, the topography of the landscape and the scarcity of valuable resources.

With the fragmentation of the hundreds in England during the 8th and 9th centuries, due to the division of larger estates and the transfer of land, smaller manorial estates gradually emerged. Other reasons for this were the endowment of lands for newly-established churches; the patronage of the lower levels of nobility; the legal inheritance of land within families; and the beginning of Norman rule. These resulted in the creation of a patchwork of parish units, the administrative boundaries of which were formalised alongside the re-assembling of manorial lands.

In places like the Chilterns, the South Downs and coastal areas of Devon and Cornwall, where resources were limited, there were more developments. For example, parish settlements in the lowland areas of the Vale of Aylesbury (Buckinghamshire) and the Thames Valley (Oxfordshire), bordering the Chiltern Hills, expanded by adding land in the adjoining largely uninhabited hillside, scarp and hilltop areas to exploit scarce resources such as woodland and upland summer pasture (by transhumance). This resulted in estates and parishes which were narrow elongated strips with a mix of land types, ensuring a greater availability of resources.

== Development of autonomous manors and parishes ==
Subsequent expansion of the temporary summer settlements resulted in the establishment of permanent communities, including the formation of autonomous manors or hamlets with their own, initially modest, chapels-of-ease, which later became churches. Where topography did not allow a parish to expand uphill in one contiguous strip, it might acquire an exclave of upland territory: for example, Marsworth and its detached manor of Hawridge. Usually, such an exclave was within the same hundred and county; but occasionally, as in Tring, Hertfordshire and its detached upland hamlet Coleshill several miles away and in Buckinghamshire, such detached communities could cross county boundaries.

As early as the late Middle Ages and as late as the 20th century, some of these "offspring" communities separated completely from their longer-established parent village miles away. Such separation sometimes caused the lowland community to relocate to a new village location. The upland communities sometimes became parishes in their own right, or amalgamated with other hilltop villages to create one or more new parishes.

A detailed account of the development of strip parishes in the Chiltern Hills can be found in The Chilterns by Leslie Hepple and Alison Doggett.

The parishes of Westerham, Brasted, and Sundridge in the Vale of Holmesdale, North West Kent are examples of strip parishes that are large enough to have a detached hamlet. Chartwell is the detached hamlet of Westerham; Brasted Chart is the detached hamlet for Brasted, and Ide Hill is the detached hamlet for Sundridge.

== Geological features ==
The geological structure of the underlying rock found in a strip parish can sometimes be indicated by the variety of local rock used to build the parish church: for example the rocks found in the church buildings in Westerham and Brasted are sandstone, Melbourne rock (hard chalk), flint, and chert. Details of the local geology can be found in local geological maps: for example the rocks cited above are indicated on the Dartford geological survey.

== Agricultural influences ==
The combination of soils that form as a result of this variety of underlying bedrock promotes prosperity because it allows several different types of agriculture in a small area: alluvium (holding water, promoting lush pastures for feeding cattle), chalk (well drained, dry for sheep), sandstone ridge (infertile, but still suitable for woodland to provide charcoal and fuel for cooking and heating).

The benefits can be enhanced if the local land profile is sloping, because the washdown from the valley sides transports the base minerals to the shelter of the valley, where they are mixed to form a fertile soil suitable for growing cereals and root crops.

== Some strip parishes in England ==
Parish	County	Detached hamlets/parishes
Eaton Bray	Bedfordshire	Formerly Boston Rural District
Toddington	Bedfordshire	
Totternhoe	Bedfordshire	
Boxford	Berkshire	
East Garston	Berkshire	
East Shefford	Berkshire	
Welford	Berkshire	
Aston Clinton	Buckinghamshire	St Leonards
Bledlow	Buckinghamshire	
Buckland	Buckinghamshire	Buckland Common
Drayton Beauchamp	Buckinghamshire	Cholesbury
Great Kimble	Buckinghamshire	Little Kimble, Ellesborough
Horsenden	Buckinghamshire	
Marsworth	Buckinghamshire	Hawridge
Monks Risborough	Buckinghamshire	
Pitstone	Buckinghamshire	
Princes Risborough	Buckinghamshire	
Saunderton	Buckinghamshire	
Stoke Mandeville	Buckinghamshire	The Hampdens, part of
Taplow	Buckinghamshire	Penn
Weston Turville	Buckinghamshire	
The Lee	Buckinghamshire	
Lympstone	Devon	
Ridge	Hertfordshire	
Shenley	Hertfordshire	
Tring	Hertfordshire	Coleshill (Bucks)
Wigginton	Hertfordshire	
Aisthorpe	Lincolnshire	
Barkston	Lincolnshire	
Barlings	Lincolnshire	
Bishop Norton	Lincolnshire	
Blankney	Lincolnshire	
Blyborough	Lincolnshire	
Bonby	Lincolnshire	
Brattleby	Lincolnshire	
Burton	Lincolnshire	
Caenby	Lincolnshire	
Cammeringham	Lincolnshire	
Caythorpe	Lincolnshire	
Dunsby	Lincolnshire	
Dunston	Lincolnshire	
Fillingham	Lincolnshire	
Fulbeck	Lincolnshire	
Glentham	Lincolnshire	
Glentworth	Lincolnshire	
Grayingham	Lincolnshire	
Hacconby	Lincolnshire	
Normanby by Spital	Lincolnshire	
North Carlton	Lincolnshire	
North Coates	Lincolnshire	
Nocton	Lincolnshire	
Marshchapel	Lincolnshire	
Martin	Lincolnshire	
Metheringham	Lincolnshire	
Morton	Lincolnshire	
Owmby-by-Spital	Lincolnshire	
Potterhanworth	Lincolnshire	
Saxby	Lincolnshire	
Saxby All Saints	Lincolnshire	
Scampton	Lincolnshire	
Scotter	Lincolnshire	
Snitterby	Lincolnshire	
Somerby	Lincolnshire	
South Carlton	Lincolnshire	
Spridlington	Lincolnshire	
Stallingborough	Lincolnshire	
Syston	Lincolnshire	
Timberland	Lincolnshire	
Waddingham	Lincolnshire	
Welton	Lincolnshire	
West Firsby	Lincolnshire	
Willoughton	Lincolnshire	
Winterton	Lincolnshire	
Worlaby	Lincolnshire	
Aston Rowant	Oxfordshire	Stokenchurch
Checkendon	Oxfordshire	
Chinnor	Oxfordshire	
Ipsden	Oxfordshire	
Kingston Bagpuize	Oxfordshire	
Lewknor	Oxfordshire	Ackhampstead, Bucks
Mongewell	Oxfordshire	
Newnham Murren	Oxfordshire	
Nuffield	Oxfordshire	
Pyrton	Oxfordshire	Stonor
Shirburn	Oxfordshire	
South Stoke	Oxfordshire	Woodcote
Watlington	Oxfordshire	Warmscombe
Ewell	Surrey	
Leigh	Surrey	Banstead
Oxted	Surrey	
Staines	Surrey	
Arundel	Sussex	
Ditchling	Sussex	
Lewes	Sussex	
Lodsworth	Sussex	
Midhurst	Sussex	
Petworth	Sussex	
Steyning	Sussex	
Charlton	Wiltshire	
Fittleton cum Haxton	Wiltshire	
