= Cholesbury-cum-St Leonards =

Civil parish in Buckinghamshire, England

Coordinates: 51.755°N 0.652°W

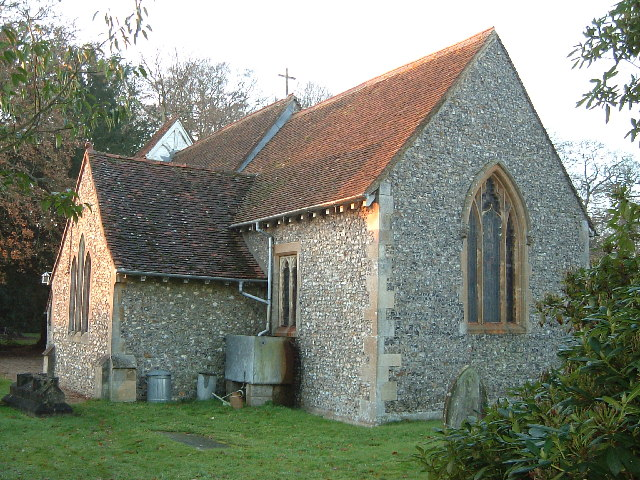
- St. Laurence's Church, Cholesbury

- Location within Buckinghamshire
- Population: 956 (2011 Census)
- OS grid reference: TG224262
- Civil parish: Cholesbury-cum-St Leonards
- Unitary authority: Buckinghamshire
- Ceremonial county: Buckinghamshire
- Region: South East
- Country: England
- Sovereign state: United Kingdom
- Post town: Tring
- Postcode district: HP23
- Police: Thames Valley
- Fire: Buckinghamshire
- Ambulance: South Central
- Website: Parish Council

Cholesbury-cum-St Leonards is a civil parish in the English county of Buckinghamshire. It lies in the Chiltern Hills just to the north of Chesham, on the boundary with Hertfordshire.

It comprises the hamlet of Buckland Common, and the villages of Cholesbury, Hawridge and St Leonards (with Lane Ends hamlet) which were brought together as part of the local government reorganisation in April 1934. The parish has since increased in size through the annexing of additional parcels of land which previously were part of Chesham, Ashley Green and Drayton Beauchamp. From 1974 to 2021 it was in the Chiltern district.

== History ==
In common with many other villages close to the scarp of the Chiltern Hills, the parishes formed from the ancient manors and estates ran from the fertile Vale of Aylesbury up the step wooded slope onto the Chiltern plateau and dip slope. They are collectively known by the social geographic term of strip parishes. Over time the upland communities, which had originally been temporary outposts connected to summer agricultural activity (transhumance), became distinct, permanent settlements.

Prior to 1934, the local government arrangements covering the area of the present-day parish were distributed across several civil parishes. Cholesbury has historical associations with Drayton Beauchamp, becoming an autonomous manor and parish from the 14th century. Meanwhile, Hawridge, which has historic associations with Marsworth despite the two settlements being separated by a narrow strip of land in Hertfordshire, became an autonomous unit from around the 16th century. The other two main settlements of the modern-day parish, prior to 1934, were the upland portions of two other parishes. St Leonards had been part of a civil parish with Aston Clinton (for a time known as Aston Clinton St Leonards). The hamlet of Buckland Common had been within the parish of Buckland. Additionally, as part of a contemporary county boundary changes, a narrow strip of mainly arable fields and woodland plantation which ran adjacent to the county boundary was transferred from Drayton Beauchamp parish, as was part of the hamlet of Heath End, a small parcel of land previously in Wingginton parish in Hertfordshire. More recently, a section of land formerly part of Chesham parish has become incorporated at the Hawridge end of the parish.

== Recreation and culture ==
The relative remoteness of the villages and hamlets within the parish, together with their close geographic and historic associations which have strengthened their mutually-held independence from the nearest towns, have resulted in a cultural identity developing across the parish. Locally, they are known as the Hilltop Villages. This is demonstrated by the existence of a number of long-established clubs and community organisations, which in similar fashion to the three local churches co-ordinate activities across the parish as a whole.

=== Sport and recreation ===
The cricket club was formed in 1895 and leases its ground in Cholesbury from the Lord of the Manors of Hawridge and Cholesbury. There is a recreation ground associated with the parish hall in St Leonards, used for football, gymkhana and village sports events. Hawridge and Cholesbury Commons are public open spaces, and the parish council look after The Green at Buckland Common and nearby allotments.

=== Social activity ===
The villages hold annual fêtes at St Leonards and on Hawridge and Cholesbury Commons. There are two community halls, Cholesbury Village Hall (built in 1895) and St Leonards Parish Hall (1938), which host many of the parish-wide social activities such as the Horticultural Society, Local History Group and Women's Institute. There are four public houses, The Black Horse, The Rose and Crown, The Full Moon and The White Lion.

Parishioners have a long-standing tradition of commemorating important anniversaries and participate in national celebrations by organising events such as parish race days, exhibitions, parish walks, and other cultural activities. The most recent of these took place in April 2009 when in the parish celebrated the parish's 75th anniversary through a series of events comprising, in April a talk and exhibition entitled 'The first 75 years of Cholesbury-cum-St Leonards Parish'. In May, an inter-village 6-a-side cricket competition was held. In June, a Beating the Bounds ceremony took place when there was a perambulation of the original (1934), fourteen-mile parish boundary, which in contrast to similar events in other counties was conducted in the traditional clockwise direction. In July, there was a celebratory 'Flower Show' at St Mary's Church and later that month a parish 'Families Fun Sports Day', including events such as children's and adult races and a Tug of War which had been a feature of several earlier celebrations in the parish relating to parish anniversaries and coronations. In August the Horticultural Show had classes celebrating the anniversary. In October there was a civil service led by the local priest. The year of commemoration concluded in February with a pantomime (Humpty-Dumpty).

== Governance ==
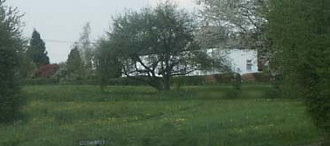
The Green at Buckland Common

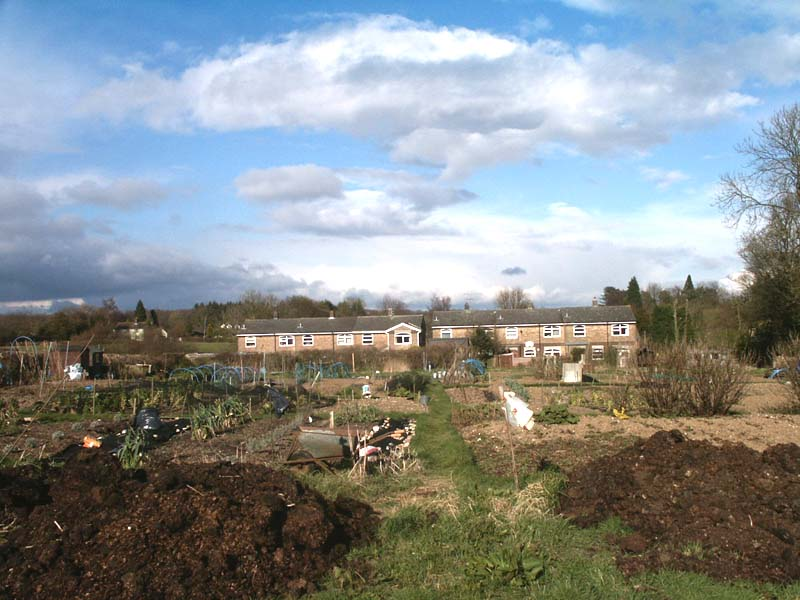
The Allotments at Buckland Common

Governance for the civil parish is administered through a parish council. The parish is un-warded and comprises seven seats. The parish has been part of the local government area administered by Chiltern District Council since its inception in 1974 and is within the Chiltern Ridges ward of Buckinghamshire County Council. There are allotments and a village green at Buckland Common which are owned by the parish council. Key issues concerning parishioners include: the increasingly poor condition and lack of maintenance of the local road network; lack in the availability of affordable housing; the negative impact on the Chilterns AONB of increased volumes of low-flying aircraft associated with Luton Airport; the impact of the proposed route through the Chilterns of the High Speed 2 railway between London and Birmingham which was announced in 2010.

== Religion ==
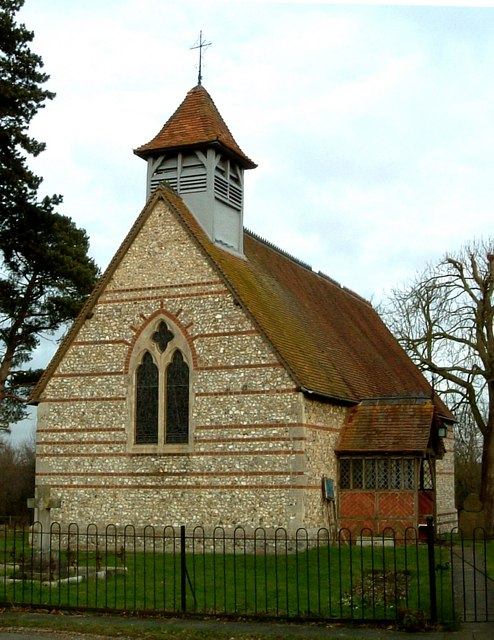
St Mary's Church, Hawridge

Today there are three Anglican churches: St Mary's Hawridge; St Laurence, Cholesbury and St Leonards, all part of the Diocese of Oxford. There was a fourth church adjacent to the Green at Buckland Common, which was deconsecrated in 1939 having fallen into disrepair. Nearby, there was also a Strict Baptist chapel which continued to serve the community until the end of the 1970s. In Hawridge a mission hall ran until the 1980s.

== Economy ==
Agriculture, which formed the basis for most employment in the parish in the first part of the 20th century, has ceased to be a significant source of work although there is employment for those supporting the remaining farming activities. There are no shops or post offices in the parish. The majority of residents are employed in the surrounding towns, or further afield in London. Since the introduction of broadband a growing number of self-employed and small businesses are run from home.

== Education ==
Originally, there were two primary schools in the parish. The St Leonards School closed in the 1970s and today education for children up to year 6 is provided by Hawridge and Cholesbury Church of England School, in Hawridge. The falling numbers of school-age children has resulted in the school providing education to pupils living outside the catchment area, primarily on the outskirts of Chesham.
