= Lowenfeld =

Lowenfeld or Loewenfeld may refer to

- Claire Loewenfeld, German nutritionist and herbalist author of books on nutrition and growing herbs
- Helena Rosa Wright née Lowenfeld, British pioneer in family planning and sex therapy
- Henry Lowenfeld, Polish-born British entrepreneur, father of Helena and Margaret
- Julian Henry Lowenfeld, American poet, playwright, trial lawyer, composer, and translator
- Margaret Lowenfeld, British child psychologist and psychotherapist
- Viktor Lowenfeld, Austrian professor of art education
