= Claire Loewenfeld =

British garden writer (1899–1974)

- Born: Claire Lewisohn; 27 September 1899; Tübingen, Germany
- Died: 20 August 1974 (aged 74); Buckland Common, Buckinghamshire
- Resting place: St Lawrence's Church, Cholesbury, Buckinghamshire
- Spouse: Günter Emanuel Loewenfeld (1895–1984)
- Parent(s): Arthur Lewisohn, Jeanette Jacobi

Claire Loewenfeld, born Lewisohn in Tübingen, Germany (27 September 1899 – 20 August 1974), was a nutritionist and herbalist who worked in England during and after the Second World War promoting the importance of good nutrition, most notably rosehips from Britain's hedgerows as a source of vitamin C. She studied at Maximilian Bircher-Benner's clinic in Zurich, Switzerland, and worked as a dietician at Great Ormond Street Hospital for Sick Children in London, where she developed a fruit and vegetable diet for the treatment of coeliac disease.

Loewenfeld was the founder of Chiltern Herb Farms in England, one of the earliest producers of high-quality dried herbs, and was one of the first members of the Soil Association. She wrote a number of books about nutrition, including Britain's Wild Larder: Fungi (1956), Herb Gardening (1967) and Everything You Should Know About Your Food (1978).

== Early life ==
Claire was born in Berlin, Germany. Her parents were Arthur and Jeanette (née Jacobi) Lewisohn. She married Günther Emmanuel Loewenfeld (November 1895–January 1984) on 5 July 1921. They continued to live in Berlin in the period following their marriage. Both Claire and Günther were from Jewish families; however, Günther was brought up in the Protestant faith. Between 1923 and 1925 they spent their weekends with friends Fritz and Lily Pincus in a rented house, in Glienicke, on the outskirts of Potsdam. In 1925 the Loewenfelds and Pincuses moved out of Berlin to adjacent rented properties which they shared on the Küssel, a peninsula jutting out into Lake Templiner in a rural district of Potsdam. Both husbands commuted to Berlin to work. By 1931 Claire and Günther had two children, Peter and Verena, likewise the Pincuses had two children. Both couples also had their relatives living with them from time to time and as more living space was needed they decided to buy their respective properties enlarging and linking them. Das Haus auf dem Küssel (The House on the Küssel) as it had become known was redesigned, to include both shared areas and private quarters, by a well-known Potsdam architect, Stephan Hirtzel. Another close friend of both families, Paul Tillich, a German-American Protestant theologian wrote a dedication on the inauguration of their new home entitled, (in English), Space and Time in Dwelling. The Loewenfeld and Pincuses' house soon became a meeting place for Tillich and his circle of German intellectuals until Tillich, whose writings brought him into conflict with the Nazi movement, was subsequently forced into exile in the U.S.

During early 1936 the Loewenfelds travelled to Syria and Palestine where they witnessed at first-hand the initial stages of the Arab uprising against British mandate and Jewish immigration. They spent the summer of 1936 near Cortina in the Italian Dolomites where they met Tillich who was on a European lecture tour. In Tillich's diary an account of their time in Palestine records: "While in Palestine, Claire and Guenther were in constant danger of their lives. Once, the only thing that saved them was their Arab guide saying they were German Nazis. Hitler is the big man with the Arabs. Mussolini gives them money to spite the British."

From 1937 Claire and Lily's home in the Küssel provided a refuge for Jewish children, whose parents had been arrested or had been abandoned and were homeless. Claire's family continued to live in Germany until the latter part of 1938 when they left Potsdam because of the increasing likelihood of arrest. The Loewenfelds had made arrangements in advance for their belongings to be transported to England. In December 1938 both children, Peter and Verena were evacuated as part of the Kindertransport rescue mission travelling on board the SS Washington from Hamburg ato Southampton and then to an English boarding school, St Christopher School, Letchworth, Hertfordshire. Meanwhile, Günther joined relatives in England and Claire travelled first to Switzerland before rejoining her husband in early 1939. The family settled in rural Buckinghamshire in 1939.

== Career ==
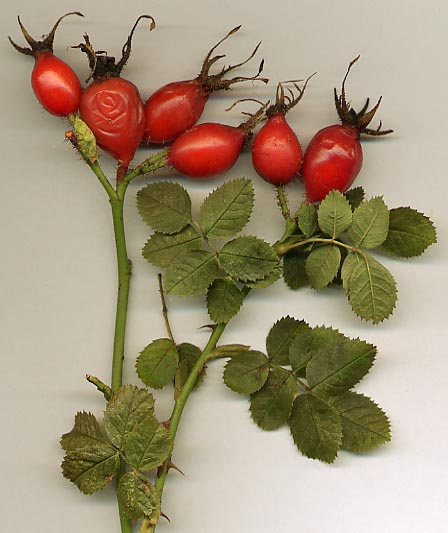
Rose hips are a particularly rich source of vitamin C

During her time in Berlin in the 1920s Claire worked at an institute "providing slides and illustrations" for a university. In late 1938 Claire Loewenfeld studied at the Maximilian Bircher-Benner's clinic in Zurich, Switzerland obtaining a special diploma in nutrition. During the Second World War, she worked at the Great Ormond Street Hospital for Sick Children in London, England as a dietician. While there she specialised in the treatment of coeliac disease and successfully developed a new diet to treat it, based on Bircher-Benner's recipes, involving raw vegetable and fruit juice; she was also involved in longitudinal comparative studies assessing various treatments for the condition.

During the war, Loewenfeld wrote to The Times and the British Medical Journal about the negative impact the shortage of fresh fruit and vegetables was having on the nation's health, and advocated the collection and distribution of rose hips from the hedgerows, as they provided "our highest home-grown source of Vitamin C". As a result, a leaflet she had prepared called Wild Rose Hips in War Time. Their Collection, Preparation and Use on how to exploit rose hips was immediately in huge demand. Over 18000 leaflets were sent by Claire to individuals as well as being widely distributed to schools and hospitals. In response, the government organised a nationwide initiative to collect roadside rose hips which, with the help of the Women's Institutes, were processed into syrup for babies and children. This was the first of several leaflets; there were an additional three under the title Wild Plants and Herbs, and three more grouped together under the heading Wild Fruits and Berries which were also distributed with the assistance of the newsagent WH Smith.

== Later life ==
After the war, Claire set up Chiltern Herb Farm in Buckland Common, Buckinghamshire, with her husband, who before the war had practiced as an attorney and later had become a landscape architect. Her experience of using dried herbs to treat sick children during the war had made her aware that the standard preparation techniques resulted in material of poor nutritional value. Experimentation led to methods for producing dried herbs of higher quality which coincided with an increasing demand in Britain for such culinary products. She also gave lectures and demonstrations, and wrote and collaborated on several books about healthy eating, herb gardening, and cooking with herbs and spices, some of which were also translated into German, Dutch and Spanish. She was a vegetarian and also promoted the benefits of Birchermüesli, or müesli as it is better known, which she learned the health benefits of while training at the Bircher-Benner Clinic. She translated into English the book by Ruth Bircher which also contained the original recipe for the cereal food (Bircher 1961). She was one of the first members of the Soil Association, advocating freshly prepared food and campaigning against the processing of food and addition of chemicals. Claire was also a member of the women's volunteer organisation, Soroptimist International.

Claire Loewenfeld died on 20 August 1974, and is buried at St Lawrence's Church, Cholesbury, Buckinghamshire, near where she lived, alongside her husband Gunther Loewenfeld's cousins, Margaret Lowenfeld and Helena Wright née Lowenfeld.

== Works ==
- Britain's Wild Larder – Nuts. Faber and Faber, 1957. ASIN B000Q9DOS0
- Britain's Wild Larder – Fungi. Faber and Faber, 1957. ASIN B0000CJC09
- Herb Gardening. Faber and Faber, 1970. ISBN 0-571-09475-9
- Everything You Should Know About Your Food. Faber and Faber, 1978. ISBN 0-571-11256-0
- with Beck, Philippa. The Complete Book of Herbs and Spices. David & Charles, 1974. ISBN 0-7153-7656-X
- ______________. Herbs for Health and Cookery. Macmillan, 1978. ISBN 0-330-25336-0
- with Bosanquet, Patience and Beck, Philippa. Britain's Wild Larder. David & Charles, 1970. ISBN 0-7153-7971-2
- (trans.) Bircher, Ruth. Eating Your Way to Health: The Bircher-Benner Approach to Nutrition. Faber and Faber, 1961. ISBN 0-571-06984-3

== See also ==
- Rationing in the United Kingdom
