= Cholesbury =

Village in Buckinghamshire, England

Coordinates: 51.7546°N 0.6521°W

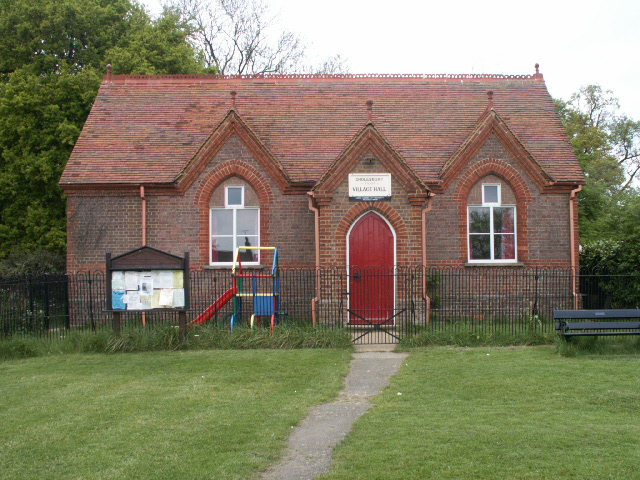
- Cholesbury Village Hall

- Location within Buckinghamshire
- OS grid reference: SP930070
  - London: 28 mi (45 km)
- Civil parish: Cholesbury-cum-St Leonards
- Unitary authority: Buckinghamshire
- Ceremonial county: Buckinghamshire
- Region: South East
- Country: England
- Sovereign state: United Kingdom
- Post town: Tring
- Postcode district: HP23
- Dialling code: 01494
- UK Parliament: Mid Buckinghamshire
- Website: Village website

Cholesbury (recorded as Chelwardisbyry in the 13th century) is a village in the civil parish of Cholesbury-cum-St. Leonards, in Buckinghamshire, England, on the border with Hertfordshire. It is situated in the Chiltern Hills, about 4 miles (6.4 km) east of Wendover, 5 mi (8.0 km) north of Chesham and 5 mi (8.0 km) from Berkhamsted.

Cholesbury is one of four villages comprising Cholesbury-cum-St Leonards parish. Braziers End is a hamlet which has always been closely associated with Cholesbury.

It is a rural community and most local people rely for employment on neighbouring towns, the proximity of London and the availability of broadband technology.

== Geography ==
At 178 acres (0.72 km^{2}), Cholesbury is one of the smallest villages in the county and is located within Chiltern downland landscape on the upland plateau and close to the chalk escarpment which overlooks the Aylesbury Vale. At its highest point the village is some 650 feet (200 m) above sea level.

=== Geology ===
The geology of the area has dictated the land use. The soil comprises gravely clay, intermixed with flints, small pebbles and öolite over a chalk formation. Several examples of puddingstones a characteristic form of this aggregate have been found locally. There are no streams in the area due to the porous chalk sub soil. In places the occurrence of clay close to the surface accounts for several natural ponds fed by springs. Until connection with mains water in the mid-20th century, the scarcity of water had necessitated the sinking of deep wells and capture of rainwater.

=== Land use ===
In contrast to nearby areas of the Chilterns more land is given over to open space, namely agricultural, both arable and pasture; paddocks; heathland and most significantly the Common on either side of which the majority of houses are arranged. Mature woodland is a feature, including a stand of beech trees which mark out the circumference of the hillfort. Some beech plantation remains formerly associated with the chair-making industry in High Wycombe. Both chalk and a small amount of clay have been extracted over the years. The latter as a raw material for pottery and more recently brick-making. Meanwhile, in more recent times flint was dug out for road making. Both activities have left their mark in the form of small mounds and shallow depressions.

Historically, many homes had access to orchards, gardens for vegetable production and pasture for domestic animals. These have largely disappeared and over the last ten years or so the increasing popularity of horse riding has created a demand for suitable land for paddocks.

=== Settlement ===
Villages in this part of the Chilterns are often set out around Greens and Commons or strung out along ridges with which they connect often without a gap to adjacent settlements. Cholesbury is consequently more closely linked in this way with the neighbouring villages of Hawridge, St Leonards and Buckland Common. The hamlet of Braziers End is closely associated with the village of Cholesbury. The name is purported to derive from braziers lit by Travellers who periodically gathered to celebrate weddings.

Until 1935 Cholesbury did not have mains water and drainage did not arrive until 1963. The road down to Chesham was frequently impassable in winter and periodic flooding has occurred even in recent years. The Second World War resulted in an influx of people escaping the London Blitz and not returning afterwards. This migration had a lasting effect with more houses built or greatly enlarged or refurbished. Transport improvements enabling daily commuting to London from the 1950s onwards also led to a further change with the growth in more affluent families which irrevocably changed the composition of the village community.

Concerns in the 1960s about uncontrolled housing development encouraged the establishment of resident's groups focused on preserving the village scene. Situated in the Chilterns AONB, and combined with national and local government planning controls there is strict enforcement of restrictions on residential building developments. This has led to a shortage in affordable and social housing. The scarcity of available property has added a premium onto house prices in Cholesbury (average selling price circa £950k as at 2007) and neighbouring villages compared to other areas in the rest of South East England.

== History ==
=== Origins and the first settlement ===
The village name is Anglo Saxon in origin, and means 'Cealwald's burh' (or plateau camp). This name refers to the Iron Age hillfort known as Cholesbury Camp close to the centre of the village, which from investigations (Kimball 1933) is understood to have been constructed between 300 and 100BC, possibly on the site of an earlier settlement which is also supported by the find of a Bronze Age axe nearby. Despite the extent of the defences trading activity rather than military purpose was the predominant use of the fort over most of its period of occupation. There is evidence of iron smelting with several hearths and waste slag having been identified from archaeological investigations. The Roman conquest of Britain meant that the use of the hillfort was relatively short-lived. By the 2nd century it had been largely deserted as the result of a probable organised migration of labour from the hill plateau to valley where villa settlements were being established (Branigan 1967). More recent investigations (Gover 2001) have suggested from evidence of rectangular structures that there was a subsequent period of occupation during early medieval times. There have been finds indicating earlier settlement including during the 1960s, a Palaeolithic hand axe.

=== Development of the manor and village ===
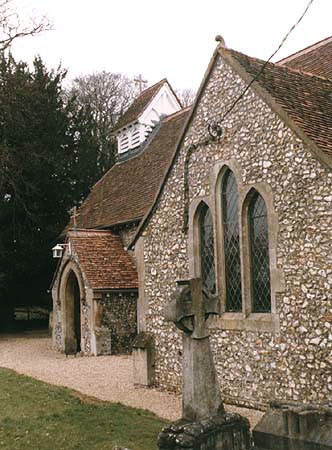
St Lawrence Church

In Edward the Confessor's time the land was part of the estate of Aluric, the King's thane and is only recorded in the Domesday Book as 'Chowdesbury', a part of the manor of Draiton valued at 100 shillings (£5). Magno le Breton who held the manor under a tenancy to one Helgist would have valued the hilltop area for its summer pasture supported by reliable springs feeding ponds. From the record of land use the area was still heavily wooded being able to sustain 200 hogs.

During this period Cholesbury still would have been a small, temporary settlement. Over the next 150 years a permanent hamlet was established remaining part of the Drayton estates and a typical example of a Chiltern strip parish. In 1091 the le Breton family although retaining ownership, passed control of the land and the income to the Knights Templar who when dissolved in 1312 passed it subsequently to the Knights Hospitaller as an endowment to the Commandery of Hogshaw. After this period Cholesbury gradually detached from Drayton Beauchamp and became a separate manor, developing into a village community indicated by the construction, within the hillfort, of an early 12th-century church dedicated to St Laurence. This is one of two churches, both incidentally called St Lawrence, to be found within hillforts in the Chilterns. The other is at West Wycombe.

By the reign of Henry III around 1248 the population was large enough to warrant Cholesbury being split off as a separate manor, still controlled by the le Bretons. The church was enlarged with the adding of a porch and its importance recognised with the appointment of a resident parson by the name of Abel. Around 1330 Thomas Perot became Lord of the manor of the estate where Parrott's Farm is today. But independence was short-lived with its association with Drayton Beauchamp being re-established in 1336 when taken control of by Mary the Dowager Countess of Norfolk. The family granted the estate to Edward II but in 1364 it was passed to Thomas Cheyne. Full independence from then manor of Drayton Beauchamp finally came in 1541 when Robert Cheyne sold the manor to Chief Justice John Baldwin.

In 1618 John Baldwin sold the manor to one Thomas Stile, one of the attorneys of the Court of King's Bench. By 1650 the rights attaching to the Lord of the manor were transferred to the Seare family who also held the manor in neighbouring Hawridge. Until the middle of the 18th century, Cholesbury continued to be just a chapelry under the administration of the parish of Drayton Beauchamp. The establishment Cholesbury as a separate ecclesiastical parish was sanctioned by the Bishop of Lincoln in 1756.

=== English Civil War ===
It is known that in common with many parts of the Chilterns there was much discontent with the levying of Ship Money and the oath required in support of the Protestation some of the causes of the dispute between Parliamentarians and King Charles I. As with other villages Parliamentarian troops were billeted in Cholesbury during the English Civil War and took part in skirmishes involving Prince Rupert at Chesham and Wendover.

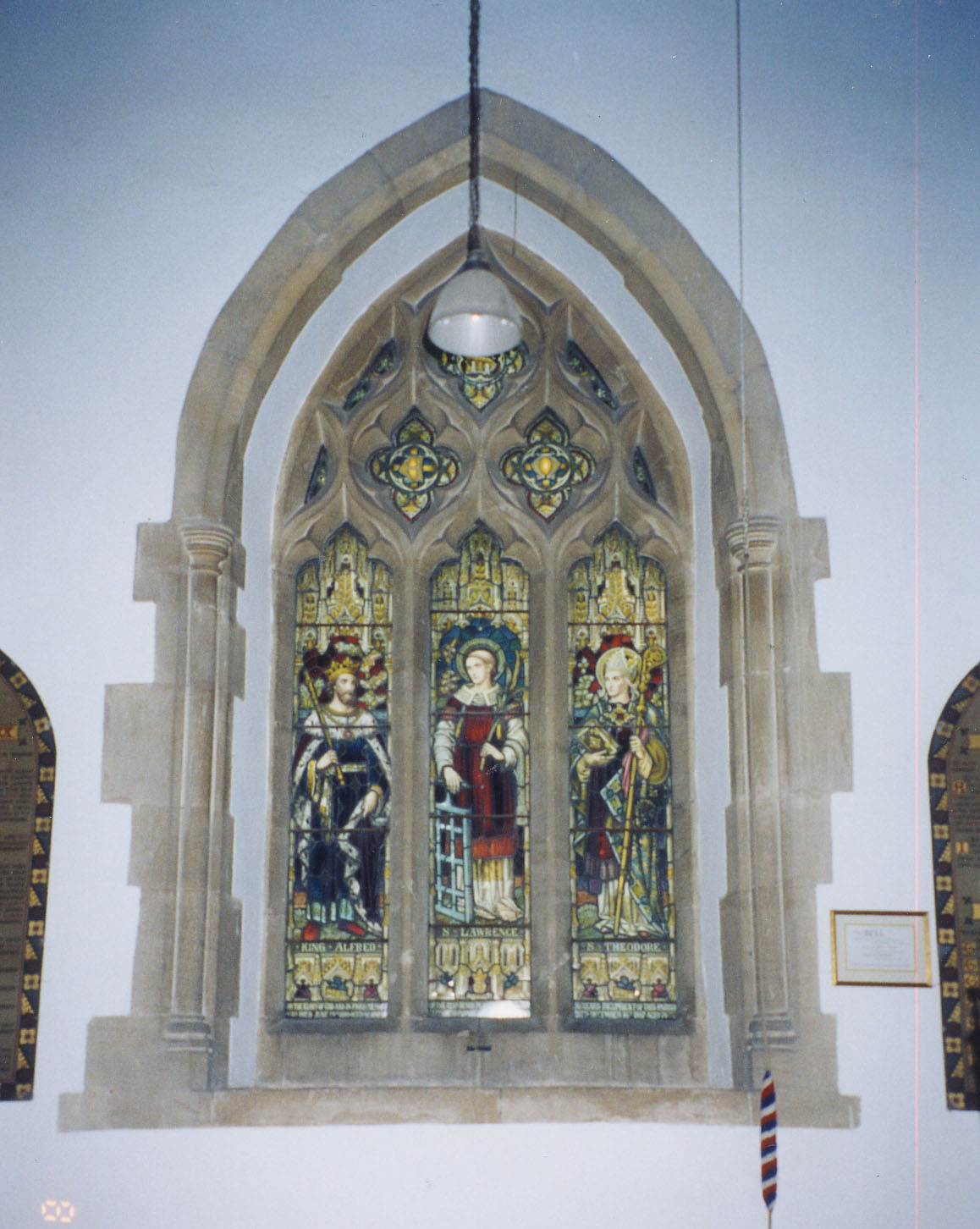
Jeston window, St Lawrence's Church

=== Impact of the Poor Laws ===
The Darell (Daryell) family had held sway in Cholesbury from 1748 until 1814 when Edward Darvell an absentee owner and Director of the Bank of England, passed it on his death to his nephew, the Rev. John Jeffreys, Rector of Barnes, Surrey. This also signalled a change in fortunes for the village.

Cholesbury can claim one modest contribution to the reform of social policy in England. From the time of Elizabeth I a levy was imposed on property owners to fund poor relief in their parish. The amount collected increased significantly during the 18th and early 19th centuries. The increasingly desperate living available off the land in this part of the Chilterns from 1812 onwards meant the parish vestry was unable to raise sufficient funds to support the poor and in 1832 declared itself bankrupt. An account of the plight of the parish was recorded in the report to Parliament by the Poor Law Commission provided by the Rev. Henry Jeston. He had arrived as vicar in 1830, chaired vestry meetings and between 1832 and 1835 and eventually raised sufficient loans from neighbouring parishes and advances from landowners, including himself, to rescue the parish from its plight and put into effect measures to ensure the future financial security of the parish. He was mentioned in the subsequent debate which led to reform of the Poor Laws for which Herbert Spencer provided an account in his most famous book The Man Versus the State. The village recognised Jeston's achievements through raising a subscription for a stained-glassed window in his honour.

== Local economy ==
Cholesbury stands at the crossroads of several droving routes, the Commons providing a safe place to rest their animals. In turn this regular traffic supported local trades and several alehouses over the years. By 1753 The Castle, the Maidenhead (later the Bricklayers Arms), next door to it the Queen's Head and The Slip Inn were operating for at least a period. They were able to flourish due to the boost in trade between the 18th and the early part of the 20th centuries when they were also frequented by the growing numbers of brickyard and agricultural labourers. None of these public houses has survived to the present day.

Prior to the 20th century, agriculture and woodworking had been the main employment for villagers although work was often of a casual nature, supplemented by road mending and season fruit picking when orchards were commonplace. Straw plaiting was the chief occupation of women and children during most of the 19th century. The plait was sent to Luton or London. Until the Second World War agriculture had been the principle industry in the area. In Chesham work could be found in mills and boot factories. The discovery of clay deposits in the surrounding area had been a source for small-scale pottery production since the 17th century. The demand for new houses after the First World War lead to the rapid expansion of brickmaking in the area and St Brown's brickworks was opened on the site of clayfields in Shire Lane. At its height it was producing between 3–3.5m bricks per year. In 1946 another local brickmaking company Dunton's, encouraged by the Ministry of Works rented land on an adjacent site to meet the demand for post-war reconstruction and new house building.

Since the Second World War some land has been progressively taken out of agricultural use although today there is still a significant area around the village given over to arable crops and sheep-grazing. Improvement to the road networks and public transport resulted in work being sought from further afield. The arrival of the railway to Chesham during the 1880s enabled travel to London and other conurbations. Today there are no significant employers remaining in the village. The 2001 census indicated a further change with increasing numbers of remote workers living in Cholesbury.

== Demographics ==
The census of 1801 records there were 122 inhabitants in 25 families living in 22 houses in Cholesbury. According to the subsequent censuses the population fell between 1801 and 1861 when it was 105. It remained around this level into the 20th century and in 1931 was still only 115.

As at 2001 93.5% of the local people were recorded as of White ethnic origin. Just under 80% declared they were Christians. Some 45% of people were in employment and 21%, a significantly higher proportion than elsewhere in the district, were self-employed and over 15% were retired which was slightly higher than in nearby areas.

== Notable people ==
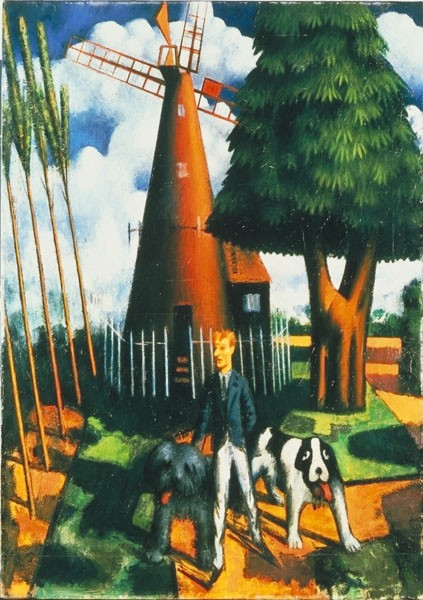
Gilbert Cannan at his Mill, 1916

Hawidge Mill (also known as Cholesbury Mill), as it strides the boundary between the two villages, became associated with members of two artists' groups, the Bloomsbury Group and the lesser known London Group around the time of the First World War. Gilbert Cannan used the mill tower as a studio and with his wife Mary Ansell frequently invited friends to stay or to rent cottages nearby. These included Katherine Mansfield and John Middleton Murry who were having an affair and lodged next door at The Gables as did Mark Gertler who between 1915–16 painted Gilbert Cannan at his Mill depicting Cannan outside the Mill with his two dogs. The black and white one had belonged to J.M. Barrie and was the inspiration for Nana in the book Peter Pan. Others visiting included D.H. Lawrence, Lady Ottoline Morrell, Compton Mackenzie, Bertrand Russell, the historian G.M. Trevelyan, the painter and interior decorator Dora Carrington, Lytton Strachey. The Cannans left the mill in 1916 and it was subsequently rented by the celebrated American actress of the day, Doris Keane.

John Haden Badley born 1865, a progressive educationalist and author who founded Bedales School now located in Steep, Hampshire in 1893, lived in Cholesbury after retiring in 1935, having served as headmaster for 42 years. After the death of his wife, Amy he returned to live in the grounds of the school until his death in 1967. General Robert Money after a distinguished military career during the First and Second World War lived in the village from the 1950s until his death in 1985. In the churchyard there are at several gravestones of interest. One commemorates David Newton who died in 1878, a Royal Marine who fought at the Battle of Trafalgar in 1805. There are adjoining gravestones of two sisters Margaret Lowenfeld a pioneer of child psychology and psychotherapy who died in 1973, her sister Helena Wright known internationally for her campaigning work in birth control and family planning who died in 1982, and their cousin's wife Claire Loewenfeld who wrote books on herb gardening and nutrition and died in 1974. Margaretta Scott (Wooldridge) also lies here.

Danny Dunton was an English international motorcycle speedway rider and promoter who reached the final of the Speedway World Championship in 1950.

== Landmarks and buildings ==
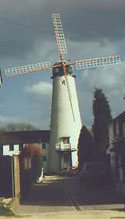
Cholesbury Windmill 1998

The Manor House, where the Lord of the manor held his court periodically between 1599 and 1607, dates back to the end of the 16th century and was once considerably larger than it is today. Many of the older houses in the village also date from around this time of expansion.

Cholesbury Camp an Iron Age hillfort and scheduled monument, is the dominant feature in the landscape. It almost circular in shape, and the 10-hectare (25-acre) site is enclosed by a double rampart or vellum, broken on its southern side by houses. Originally, a palisade, requiring wood from between 10–15,000 trees, would have topped the earthworks. Today, the extent of the fort is demarcated by a magnificent stand of mature beech trees. Associated with the fort is a pond, known locally as the 'Holy' or 'Bury' pond, which is fed by a spring, that is perpetual: it has never been known to run dry, even in the severest of droughts. The church of St Lawrence is within the hillfort's boundary. Cholesbury Common runs through the village either side of the road.

Buildings of note include Cholesbury Windmill which was first built in 1863 as a smock mill but was rebuilt in the style of a tower mill in 1883. Cholesbury Village Hall, built in 1895 on land given by Frederick Butcher, a banker, from Tring and contemporary of the other banking dynasty, the Rothschild family who also lived in the area. Butcher was a staunch supporter of the Temperance movement and saw the importance of providing recreational facilities for working men as an alternative to the alehouses. An exterior shot of the village hall was used in the 2013 BBC television comedy Up the Women. In 1899 Henry J. Turner, J.P. bought the lordship and living at Braziers End House was the first Lord to reside in his Manor for nearly 300 years.

The 'Full Moon' public house dates from the 17th century. The pub was known as the Half Moon until 1812, the Moon from then until 1883, when it took its present name. The Full Moon was the traditional meeting place for the Lord of the manor of Hawridge to hold court, with proceedings mainly concerned with the use of the commons, especially grazing rights and enclosures.

A stone obelisk on the boundary between Hawridge and Cholesbury was erected in 1898 to mark Queen Victoria's Diamond Jubilee the year before. Nearby a group of three puddingstones was assembled and dedicated in November 2012 on the occasion of the Diamond Jubilee of Queen Elizabeth II.

== Governance ==
The manorial rights originating from the 12th century, which have continued to be held jointly with Hawridge since the 17th century no longer control village life. Hawridge and Cholesbury Commons Preservation Society manage the Commons, which is still owned by a Lord of the manor. The church vestry has been succeeded by the parochial church council focusing on church affairs and its responsibilities for the village ceded to the parish council.

Cholesbury is one of four 'Hilltop Villages', the others being Hawridge, St Leonards and Buckland Common. Prior to 1934 Cholesbury had been a separate parish and part of Aylesbury Rural District. On 1 April 1934 it came together with the other villages to form the new civil parish of Cholesbury-cum-St Leonards and was also transferred to Amersham Rural District. As part of the 1974 Local Government reorganisation the rural district was succeeded by Chiltern District.

== Education ==
Until the opening of the National School in Hawridge in 1874 education was provided in the village by a straw plaiting school also mentioned in a Select committee report of 1819. (Hay and Hay 1994) Children between the ages of 5 and 11 attend Hawridge and Cholesbury Church of England School in nearby Hawridge. A private nursery school is based at Cholesbury Village Hall.

The catchment area secondary schools are:- Chiltern Hills Academy and Chesham Grammar School in Chesham, Dr Challoner's Grammar School for boys in Amersham and – Dr Challoner's High School for girls in Little Chalfont.

== Transport ==
Almost 95% of local residents have access to a car. Over the years the provision of buses has decreased significantly. Today a bus service runs once each way on alternative days connecting to Chesham, Tring and local villages. School buses are a valuable facility transporting children to secondary schools in Chesham and Amersham.

== Sport and recreation ==
The cricket club was founded in 1885 with permission from the Lord of the manor to use the Common and continues to thrive today with the First XI playing in the Premier Division of the Morrant Chiltern League.

The local area with its open views, rural lanes, commons and woodland, criss-crossed by footpaths and bridleways consequently are very popular with cyclists, walkers and horse riders. The churches of Hawridge and Cholesbury jointly hold a summer fête on the August Bank Holiday Monday, alternatively on Hawridge and Cholesbury Commons. The Vale of Aylesbury with Garth & South Berks Hunt traditionally hold a meet on Boxing Day (26 December) which draws a large crowd from the local district. The Village Hall hosts events from the organisations, of the local villages (Horticultural Society, Local History Group, Commons Preservation Society, Thursday Club) as well as 'Cholesbury Teas' on Sundays during summer months.
