= St Leonards, Buckinghamshire =

Village in Buckinghamshire, England

Coordinates: 51.7552°N 0.6837°W

St Leonards
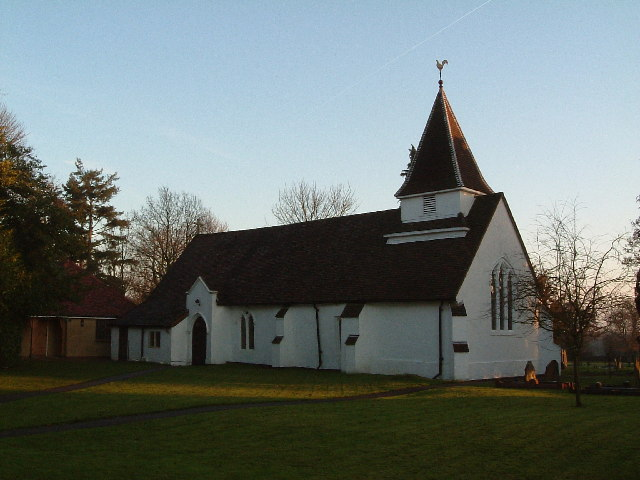
- St Leonard's Church

- Location within Buckinghamshire
- OS grid reference: SP909071
  - London: 30 miles
- Civil parish: Cholesbury-cum-St Leonards
- Unitary authority: Buckinghamshire
- Ceremonial county: Buckinghamshire
- Region: South East
- Country: England
- Sovereign state: United Kingdom
- Post town: Tring
- Postcode district: HP23
- Dialling code: 01494
- UK Parliament: Mid Buckinghamshire
- Website: Cholesbury-cum-St Leonard’s

St Leonards is a small village in the Chiltern Hills in Buckinghamshire, England. It is 3 miles east of Wendover and 4 miles south of Tring, Hertfordshire. A short section of Grim's Ditch delineates the northern end of the village, which lies within the civil parish of Cholesbury-cum-St Leonards.

== Early history ==
=== Prehistoric ===
The earliest evidence of habitation is indicated by a short section of the Chiltern Grim's Ditch linear earthwork, which is believed to have been constructed during the Iron Age. Though what remains is eroded and poorly preserved a ditch and bank are still visible. There are also examples of pottery shards, possibly associated with a small Iron Age bloomery found in a brick-earth quarry and iron slag (at Newsetts Wood) indicating there was a significant community living in the area close to the present-day Dundridge Manor. St Leonards is not mentioned in the Domesday Book however the muster roll tells us that by 1522 St Leonards was a hamlet of some 30–40 residents.

=== St Leonard's Church ===
The early history of the village centres on the foundation of a chapel at St Leonards. A charter of Henry de Crokesley from around 1187 refers to him granting the manor at Dundridge to Missenden Abbey and setting aside land for the chapel-of-ease at St Leonards. By 1278 St Leonards was more closely associated with Aston Clinton. Richard Gravesend Bishop of Lincoln and Archdeacon of Oxford on a visitation granted William de Clinton Lord of the Manor of Aston Clinton, the right to establish a consecrated chapel on the site of the former hermitage belonging to Missenden Abbey. The chapel was dedicated to St Leonard of Noblac also recorded as "Leonardi de Blakemere" (possessive form) in 1250).

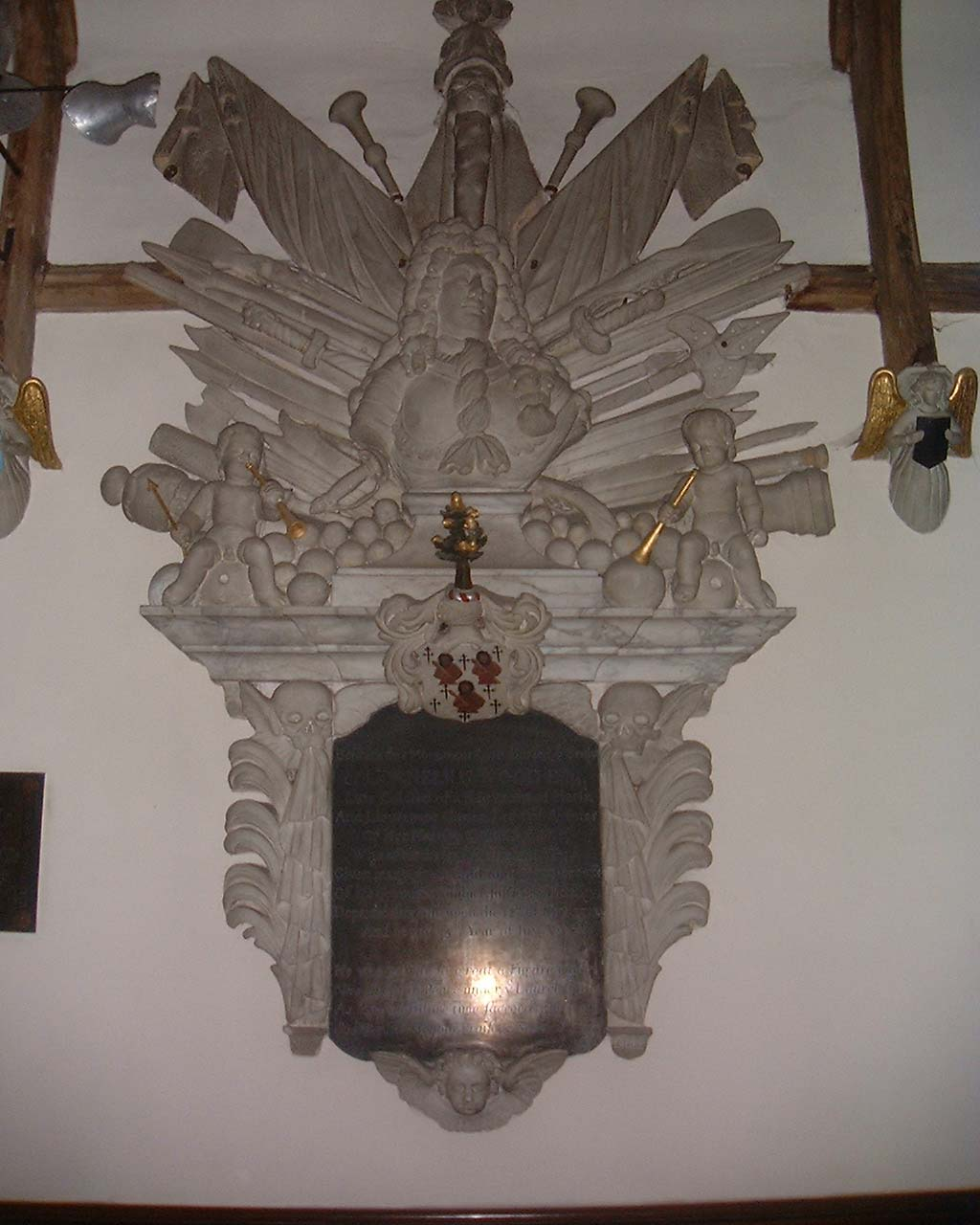
Cornelius Wood memorial St Leonards Church

The choice of Leonardus or Leonard may have been in recognition of a hermit associated with Missenden Abbey known as the 'Hermit of the Woods', according to the Pipe Rolls of 1196. However this has not been verified and the choice of St Leonard might have been because the hermit was instead connected with St Leonard's Hospital in Aylesbury. Blakemere is thought to be a reference to Black Mere, a marshy area and pond that appears in records from that time. (The pond survived until it was filled in around 1923).

It has been determined that most of the current church was built in the 15th century, though a piscina and sedile are of 14th century design and were probably saved from the earlier building. The bell in the Bell-Cot was made in 1702 by Chandler from Drayton Parslow. Despite the Dissolution of the Monasteries the church continued in use as a chapel-of-ease until after 1586 when an inquisition was held in the name of Queen Elizabeth into why the chapel and lands had not reverted to the crown. However following successful pleas from Silvester and Henry Baldwin, it was permitted that from 1587 services could be held there once again, for the benefit of local woodsmen, because Aston Clinton church was a good hour's walk away, and the long journey stopped them from getting on with their work). By 1640 the church had fallen into disrepair and at the end of the English Civil War remaining were only bare walls of timber-framed construction which mainly dates to the 15th century although some evidence of the earlier chapel also remains to this day in the form of a 13th-century piscina and sedile. The building was largely rebuilt in a simple Queen Anne style around 1700, paid for by the brother of John Wood, the then minister. Within the church one of two large commemorative memorials to the Wood family, is a marble bust of General Cornelius Wood who as benefactor was responsible for the major restoration of the church at the end of the turn of the 16th century. Wood was also Colonel of the Earl of Plymouth's Regiment of Horse until his death in 1712. His generosity also enabled the chapel to be freed from the control of the Bishop, and Trustees were given autonomy to appoint the incumbent.

=== Dundridge manor ===
There is a record of a manor and farm estate at Dundridge (orig. Dunryge) in the 12th century, though possibly on the site of an earlier Saxon settlement. It was part of the lands granted to Missenden Abbey, and the tenant was Henry de Crokesley. Subsequently, the manor came under the control of the Montagu family and later it came into the possession of Margaret Pole, 8th Countess of Salisbury. A lease to Dundridge Manor seems to have been held by William Baldwin (1441 – abt. 1475 or 1479), which his son Robert Baldwin inherited, as evidenced by his payment of 6 shillings and 6 pence in tax upon it in 1525. It may be presumed that the Baldwins leased the manor from its owner, the Countess of Salisbury, and later from Henry VIII. The Countess held the lands until Henry VIII's time, when he seized them from the Abbey and had Margaret Pole beheaded. In 1545, Henry granted Dundridge to Sir John Baldwin who was Chief Justice of the Common Pleas. Though believed not related to Sir John Baldwin, Dundridge remained in the control of the Baldwin family until 1768, when the fortunes of the Baldwins waned and the house and manor lands were sold in lots.

Dundridge Manor house is recorded to have fallen into disrepair at the time it was disposed of to the Darvill (Darell) family. During the 19th century it passed through marriage to the Jeffrey family. The Rev. John Jeffrey, rector of Barnes, inherited it. After his death, in 1900, the manor house and part of the estate was sold to Robert Green. The Rodwell family lived there, breeding pheasant, until the Second World War when forced by the war agricultural executive committee to relinquish the farm estate. It was purchased by the Matthews family, who have occupied it since then. The house was recorded as Grade II listed in 1983.

A Sylvester Baldwin was born at Dundridge manor around 1602. He subsequently became the tenant of Chapel Farm, part of the Dundridge estate. In 1638, with his wife and children, he set sail for New England on the ship Martin. Though Sylvester did not survive the journey, the Baldwin family successfully settled in the newly established New Haven Colony on land adjacent to the present day Milford, Connecticut, from where it spread out across the continent.

=== Daniel Bacheler ===
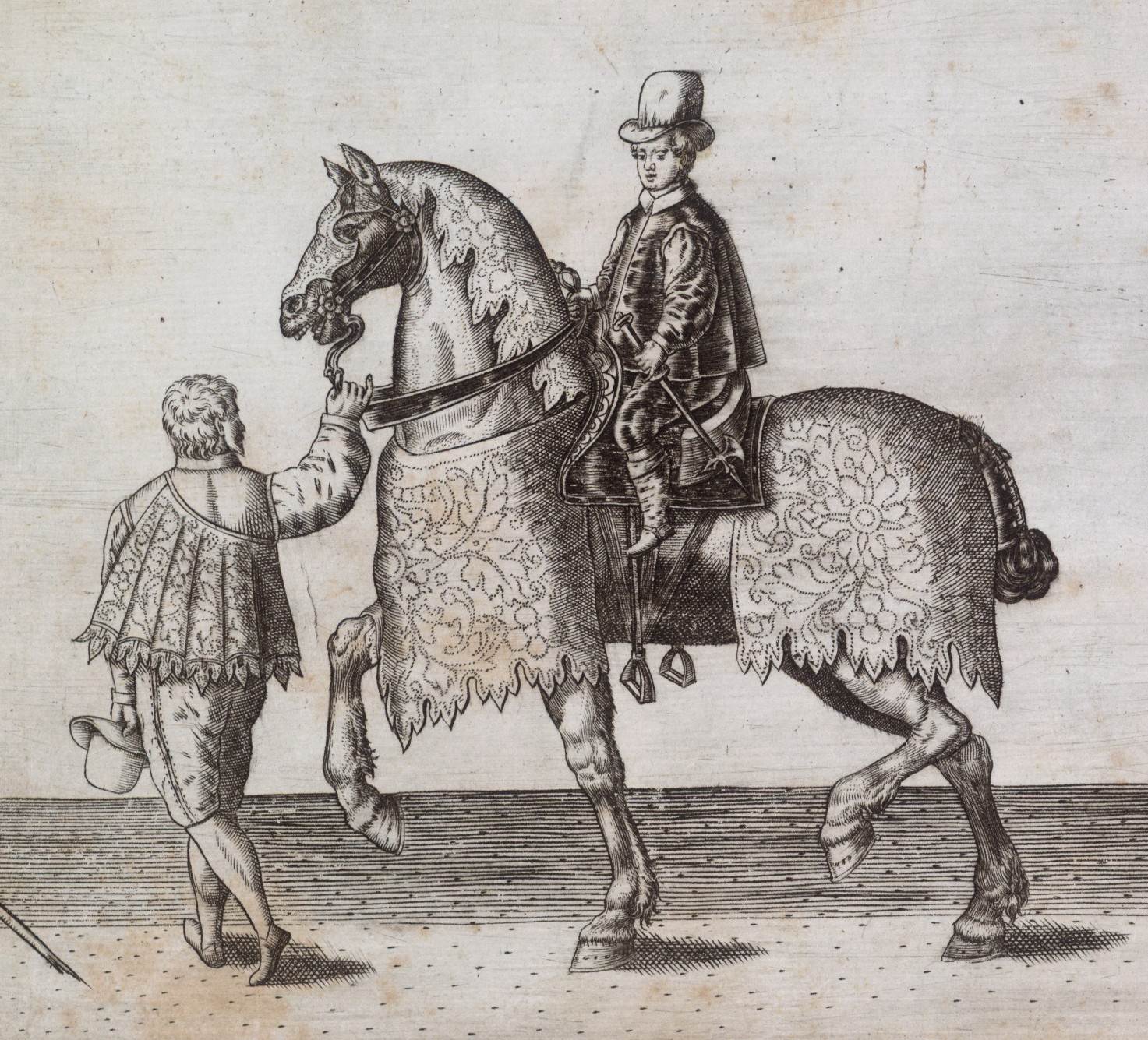
Daniel Bacheler in the funeral procession of Sir Philip Sidney in 1587. Engraving by Thomas Lant

Daniel Bacheler, sometimes spelt Batchellor, (1572–1619) was born in the village at Chapel Farm. He was a composer of lute music at the Court of Elizabeth I. He was also a servant and courier to Francis Walsingham and the Earl of Essex, particularly when the latter served as Lord Lieutenant of Ireland. On one occasion he was paid £10 by Elizabeth to act as go-between and deliver letters to Essex. He accompanied Walshingham to the Netherlands to recover and return to England the body of Sir Philip Sidney, Walshingham's son-in-law. Bacheler's close association with court life is evidenced by a contemporary mural of Sidney's funeral procession to St Paul's Cathedral in 1587, which depicts him astride a horse. He is credited with introducing consort music and was a contemporary of John Dowland who was a lutinist at the Court of James I, whilst Bacheler had been elevated to Groom of the Privy Chamber, a position of significant trust as confidant to Anne of Denmark.

== Development of the settlement ==
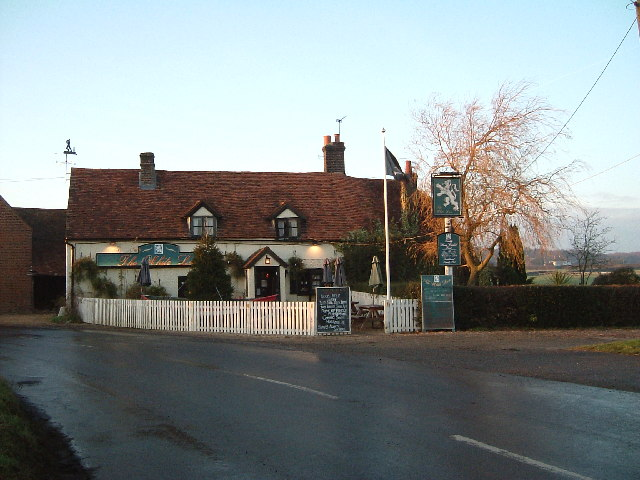
White Lion Pub

Around 1700 a number of unlicensed alehouses were opened and soon closed by the constables. The first licensed premise was the White Lion in 1714. After ceasing trading in 2015, an attempt to change use to residential was unsuccessful. The premises were then refurbished until June 2021 and the pub has now reopened. The extensive Commons at St Leonards were enclosed in 1816. St Leonards Parish Hall was built in 1938 behind which there are extensive playing fields. St Leonards National School, which was founded in 1860, across the road from the church, and remained open until 1973 when children of the village transferred to the Hawridge and Cholesbury Church of England School in Hawridge. It is now a private house. Gilberts Hill acquired its name from the post Office and grocers shop, once run by Samuel and Phoebe Gilbert which closed in 1975.

== Governance ==
When civil parishes were established in 1896 the village was assigned to the parish of Aston Clinton and St Leonards. From 1934 St Leonards has formed part of Cholesbury-cum-St Leonards parish which, in addition to St Leonards comprises Cholesbury, Buckland Common and Hawridge

== Notable people ==
- John Robert Blayney Owen, (1849–1921) who was born in the village, played one international football match for England against Scotland in 1874. He was later ordained and became headmaster of Hawkshead Grammar School.
