= Helena Rosa Wright =

British pioneer of birth control (1887–1982)

- Born: Helena Rosa Lowenfeld; 17 September 1887; Brixton, London, England
- Died: 21 March 1982 (aged 94); St John's Wood, London, England
- Resting place: St Lawrence's Church, Cholesbury, Buckinghamshire
- Known for: pioneer in family planning and sex education
- Spouse: Henry Wardel Snarey Wright (1892–1976)
- Parent(s): Henry Lowenfeld, Alice Evans

Helena Rosa Wright (17 September 1887 – 21 March 1982) was an English pioneer and influential figure in birth control and family planning both in Britain and internationally. With her husband she undertook missionary work in China for five years. She qualified as a medical doctor, later specialising in contraception medicine. Helena became renowned as an educator and also as a campaigner for government funded family planning services and became associated with international organisations promoting population control programmes. She was the author of several books and training guides on birth control, sex education and sex therapy.

== Family background ==
Helena's father, Henryk (Henry) Loewenfeld had arrived in England from Silesia, Austro-Hungarian occupied Poland in the early 1880s. Although almost penniless he soon became a wealthy businessman through a variety of ventures, including buying up rundown theatres in the West End of London and starting a brewery producing non-alcoholic beer in Fulham when the temperance movement had taken hold. He married an English woman, Alice Evans in 1884.

Helena was born in Tulse Hill, Brixton. Soon after her birth, the family were able to move into a large house, staffed by servants in Lowndes Square, Knightsbridge, West London. Helena was initially educated at home by governesses and attended Princess Helena College then located in Ealing followed by Cheltenham Ladies College in Gloucestershire. Her younger sister, Margaret Lowenfeld, also became a doctor and was a renowned pioneer in the fields of child psychology and psychotherapy.

== Career ==
=== Medical training and hospital surgical work ===
Helena had wanted to become a medical doctor from the age of six despite strong parental opposition. From 1908 she attended the London Royal Free Hospital School of Medicine for Women in Bloomsbury, London obtaining a MRCS (Eng.) and LRCP (Lond.) in 1914 and MB, BS (Lond.) in 1915. Later that year she started work in the outpatients department of Hampstead General Hospital in Camden Town, later transferring to the main hospital in Haverstock Hill as house surgeon. However, having been reported to the police due to her foreign name, she was required to resign her job at the hospital in May 1915. After a short break she took up an appointment as a house surgeon at the Hospital for Sick Children, Great Ormond Street. Meanwhile, she was active in the Student Christian Movement and was a member of the London Inter-Faculty Christian Union and had declared herself a pacifist. Her beliefs precluded her from joining the Royal Army Medical Corps but she worked as a civilian junior surgeon under military supervision at the Bethnal Green Hospital in east London.

=== Missionary work ===
Even before their marriage both Helen and her husband Peter discussed their shared vocation to become student missionary volunteers in China. In October 1921 she fulfilled her ambition by taking up the position of associate professor of gynaecology at the Shandong Christian University, now part of Shandong Medical University in Jinan. Helena and Peter had intended this missionary work to continue for the rest of their lives. However, in the event it came to an end after five years when the missionary work was halted due to increasing hostilities and the imminent arrival of the Nationalists. After their visit to England in March 1927 they were unable to return. Despite this, Helena recorded her experiences in China as 'a complete fulfilment of all I expected and more'.

=== Pioneer in birth control and sex education ===
On her return after five years in China, Helena had become convinced her future vocation lay in enhancing the status of contraception medicine. She first sought out Marie Stopes whom by chance she had met in 1918, during a holiday at Lands End in Cornwall. Marie had mentioned her plans to open a birth control clinic in England, the first of its kind. By 1921, Marie had opened the Mothers' Clinic for Constructive Birth Control in Holloway, north London and then a second clinic in Walworth, south London which Helena visited. Helena discovered Marie had been badly affected by losing a protracted libel action she had initiated against the Roman Catholic Church. In Helena's view this had left Marie bitter, bordering on paranoia, as well as resentful towards the medical profession, almost exclusively male at the time, which had been opposed to her views that women should receive birth control advice from trained nurses rather than doctors. This approach was also at odds with Helena's own views.

This experience contrasted with Helena's visit to the Women's Centre in North Kensington where she met its founder the social reformer, Margery Spring Rice. Helena was able to persuade Margery that contraceptive advice should be given by specially trained gynaecologists. Margery offered Helena the job of Chief Medical Officer at the Kensington Centre, a role which she continued in for thirty years becoming also Chairman of the Medical Committee. Working in collaboration with Margery, Helena was able to ensure the Centre became a focus for training medical students and nurses in birth control, sex education and therapy which also gave Helena an international reputation. In 1930 Helena addressed the Lambeth Conference, persuading bishops of the Church of England to give their blessing to the use of contraceptives in marriage.

Helena was paid just £2 per weekly session in 1928 for her work at the Kensington Centre. For income Helena relied on family money and in due course a private gynaecological practice she was building, temporarily based at her sister Margaret's consulting rooms prior to Helena and Peter being able to set up separate consulting practices in Weymouth Street, premises which she continued to occupy throughout her career.

=== Educator and campaigner ===
By 1931 there were at least five independent birth control clinics in the UK. The National Birth Rate Commission noted that each used their own techniques and equipment and there was little gathering of research or sharing of scientific knowledge. Following protracted discussions agreement was reached on establishing a single co-ordinating body on which the leading birth control practitioners would sit. Marie Stopes had continued her public hostilities towards both the Catholic Church and the medical fraternity and she was initially going to be excluded on grounds that she did not have medical qualifications. However Helena secured Marie's involvement in return for agreeing to her own participation on the co-ordinating committee and to 'manage' Stopes. The National Birth Control Association (NBCA) was formed which in turn evolved into the Family Planning Association (FPA) in 1939. Despite Helena's best efforts, Marie Stopes' participation in the national association survived only until 1933 when she resigned from the executive committee having found her opinions on contraception increasingly ignored.

After obtaining charitable status for the NBCA in 1931, Helena worked with the medical committee which she now chaired to establish standards in the use of contraceptive devices and the safety of procedures and medicines. In the latter case, the NBCA went on to sponsor the development and licensing of proprietary medicines for distribution to birth control clinics.

From 1936 Helena established the first curriculum for contraceptive medicine at her North Kensington clinic. She also started to teach at the British Postgraduate Medical School at Hammersmith, the first medical school in Britain to include lectures in contraception for trainee doctors. The numbers of women pursuing the advice and completing courses of treatment had also increased. The term sex therapist was not in use in the 1930s, however; in retrospect Helena is described as one of the early British practitioners. This phase of her career is also marked by the publication of the short handbook Birth Control: Advice on Family Spacing and healthy Sex Life and her 1930 book, The Sex Factor in Marriage, which focussed on dispelling ignorance about sexual relations.

The Second World War brought a rapid decline in FPA activity. Helena continued to work at her clinic but became concerned for the women who had enlisted and needed help due to pregnancy. She failed to persuade the War Office that the FPA should train medics but was able to offer her own support and a place to stay for women who became pregnant. After the war, the National Health Service failed to ensure family planning was included within the plans for health services provision which led to the FPA running virtually all birth control clinics and pregnancy diagnosis laboratories. Helena continued to experience opposition to the work of the FPA and resistance to her approach to birth control in many quarters well into the 1950s. However, in 1955 she was instrumental in obtaining the surprise support for the FPA from Iain Macleod, the then UK Minister for Health. This initiative was seen as a watershed in public opinion towards birth control and contraception. However, the fundamental change in public policy towards a government-sponsored family planning services in the UK had to wait until the 1974 reorganisation of the NHS when responsibilities for family planning were handed over to local health authorities.

=== International work ===
During the late 1940s Helena became more and more frustrated by the FPA's 'introverted' attitude towards encouraging good practice and raising standards of family planning and strived for the FPA to adopt a more international perspective. Together with Margaret Pyke, a fellow pioneer in family planning, an international conference of family planning institutions from around the world was organised in Cheltenham, Gloucestershire in 1948 at which plans were made for a new international organisation. Helena worked closely with others, including Margaret Sanger, the American birth control campaigner, to promote the development of family planning programmes on a worldwide basis. This culminated in 1952 with the inauguration of the International Planned Parenthood Federation (IPPF). She retired from the FPA in 1957 but continued in private practice and to train foreign physician students in family-planning practices. Her 1968 book, Sex and Society, was described as "pioneering" through its promotion of voluntary fertility and the impact of this on society. She travelled extensively, teaching and lecturing on family planning. Her last visit was to India in 1976.

=== Semi retirement ===
In 1975, at the age of 88, Helena handed over her private consulting practice in Weymouth Street to her successor. She continued to support the work of the IPPF, travelling abroad to conferences and to lecture including, for example, a visit to Sri Lanka in 1974 at the age of 87. She remained active into her 93rd year, travelling to FPA events in the UK, meeting IPPF delegates from abroad and being interviewed on the BBC. Brian Harrison recorded 2 oral history interviews with Helena, in February and April 1977, as part of the Suffrage Interviews project, titled Oral evidence on the suffragette and suffragist movements: the Brian Harrison interviews. In addition to mentioning her parents, childhood and education she talks about the British birth control movement in the 1930s and 40s, referencing Marie Stopes and Eva Hubback.

== Personal Family life ==
In May 1916, while at Bethnal Green Hospital, she met Captain Henry Wardel Snarey Wright whom she always called Peter. He was a RAMC surgeon whom she married at the Savoy Chapel in the Strand, London on 17 August 1917. Their first son Beric Wright, who in time was also to become a renowned doctor, was born on 17 June 1918. Christopher Wright, their second son was born on 18 October 1920 just a year before their departure to China. Their third son, Michael, (10 April 1923), and fourth son Adrian, (6 September 1926), were both born during their time at Jinan.

Helen and Peter's work was not financially well rewarded, at least initially, and in the period following their return to England they found it a struggle to sustain a lifestyle at the level they had both been used to. Helena had access to money from her mother's estate but they were also committed to supporting the private education of their four boys who all presented their parents and teachers with problems and challenges. By 1955, the surprise success of Helena's book, The Sex Factor in Marriage, particularly in the US, provided much needed income to meet the rising costs of their larger house in London. In 1962 her second son, Christopher died suddenly while being treated for depression. Helena had already developed an interest in astrology and the paranormal. She thought Christopher had strong extrasensory perception and at the time of his death her conviction in attending séances was reinforced as she reported receiving a 'message' from him and other deceased friends of hers. Helena also became an advocate of alternative medicine in the latter part of her career.

In 1962 Helena also bought Brudenell House, a former rectory in Quainton, Oxfordshire. This was a weekend retreat for Helena and her close friend Bruce McFarlane the medieval historian based nearby at Magdalen College, Oxford. Helena had first met Bruce at Oxford in 1930 when he advised on her son Christopher's troubled education. He soon became a family friend and regular guest of the Wrights. During their marriage both Helena and Peter had relationships with several other people and in her professional role she was encouraging to those patients who consulted her about their extra-marital relationships. The architect Oliver Hill was one with whom she had an affair. Helena's long-standing relationship with Bruce was known openly by family and friends. In 1952 Bruce dedicated his book on John Wycliffe to Helena and on his death in 1966, while on a picnic with Helena, he left all his possessions to her and made Peter his executor.

Peter Wright died in May 1976. Helena died, age 95 in 1982 and was buried along with her sister, Margaret and alongside her cousin, Günther's wife, Claire Loewenfeld at the Church of St Lawrence, Cholesbury, Buckinghamshire. Another cousin, Ralph Beyer, who worked with Basil Spence designing and carving the 'Tablets of the Words' at Coventry Cathedral, carved the inscriptions on the tombstones.

== Controversies ==
=== Third-party adoptions ===
In the 1940s Helena publicly expressed her support for abortion, which she made no secret that she would arrange. In 1947 her views brought her to the attention of the police. Around 1957 Helena initiated 'third party' adoptions by bringing together childless couples with mothers seeking abortions or being unable to look after their newborn children. Although her actions were frowned on by local authority social workers who wanted her activities stopped they were deemed legal under the Adoption Act 1957. However, Helena was frequently frustrated by the convoluted rules and in ignoring these, from time to time, she faced both sanction from the authorities and in 1968 faced criminal prosecution. She pleaded guilty but was given an absolute discharge.

=== Eugenics ===
In common with a number of her colleagues who were involved in birth control during the period between 1930 and 1960, Helena was a member of the British Eugenics Society.

== Bibliography ==
Books by Helena Wright

- Birth Control: Advice on Family Spacing and Healthy Sex Life, London: Cassell and Co, 1935
- The Sex Factor in Marriage: A Book for hose who are or are about to be married, New York: The Vanguard Press, 1938
- More about the Sex Factor in Marriage, London: Williams and Norgate, 1947
- What is Sex? London: Williams and Norgate, 1947
- An Outline for Young People; Birth Control, London: Benn, 1962
- Sex and Society: New Code for Social Behaviour, London: Allen & Unwin, 1968, ISBN 0-295-95009-9

Books by Helena Wright and others

- Contraceptive technique: a handbook for medical practitioners and senior students (with Beric Wright). London: Churchill 1951
