= Buckland, Buckinghamshire =

Village in Buckinghamshire, England

Coordinates: 51.803°N 0.713°W

Buckland
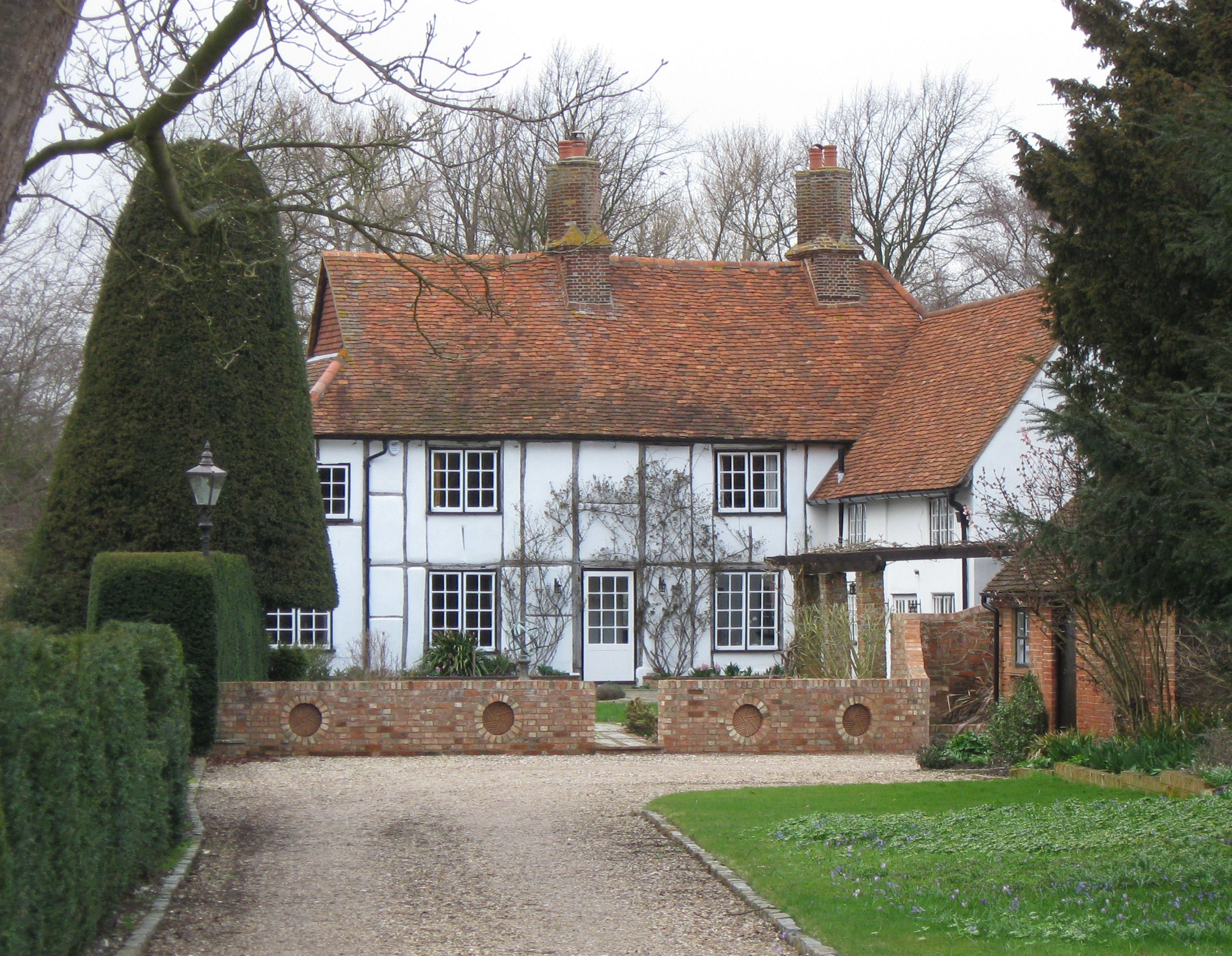
- Church Farm, Buckland, 2009

- Location within Buckinghamshire
- Population: 713 (2011 Census)
- OS grid reference: SP8812
- Civil parish: Buckland
- Unitary authority: Buckinghamshire
- Ceremonial county: Buckinghamshire
- Region: South East
- Country: England
- Sovereign state: United Kingdom
- Post town: Aylesbury
- Postcode district: HP22
- Dialling code: 01296
- Police: Thames Valley
- Fire: Buckinghamshire
- Ambulance: South Central
- UK Parliament: Aylesbury

Buckland is a village and civil parish in the county and unitary authority of Buckinghamshire, England. The village is near the boundary with Hertfordshire, close to Aston Clinton. The hamlet of Buckland Wharf is in the parish. It takes its name from its wharf on the Wendover Branch of the Grand Union Canal that passes through the parish.

== History ==
The village toponym is a common one in England. It is Old English in origin, and refers to a place which has received a Royal charter of some description. It is not known the type of charter to which it refers in this case.

Before the Norman conquest of England, the manor of Buckland was held by the Diocese of Dorchester-on-Thames in Oxfordshire under the control of Godric. After 1066 William I granted it to the Bishop of Lincoln. It remained so until the 16th century when the then tenant, the Earl of Warwick forfeited it to the Crown. By 1584 it had been passed to Robert Dormer, 1st Earl of Carnarvon. Robert was killed fighting on the Royalist side during the English Civil War at the first Battle of Newbury. His lands, including Buckland, were confiscated by the Parliamentarians but were recovered in 1653 by the Charles Dormer, 2nd Earl of Carnarvon and held until death in 1709. Through marriage it passed to Philip Stanhope, 4th Earl of Chesterfield and remained in the family until George Hassall of Cholesbury acquired it around 1815. Subsequent Lords of the Manor included John Atkinson and Peter Parott.

The Church of England parish church of All Saints, Buckland was built in 1284. A Wesleyan Methodist chapel was built in 1831, although not recognised as a religious location by the authorities until 1837. The Church remains a place of worship, however the chapel has since been converted into a house.

During the 16th century land at the southern end of the parish of Buckland which had been progressively cleared of scrub was transformed from an area of temporary summer pasture to one of permanent settlement subsequently to become known as Buckland Common. It remained a remote outpost of Buckland parish until becoming part of the newly created parish of Cholesbury-cum-St Leonards in 1934.

== Economy ==
The enormous dairy Arla Aylesbury is situated in the village. It produces 1.75 billion pints of milk per year, around 10% of the milk in the UK.
