= Buckland Common =

Hamlet in Buckinghamshire, England

Coordinates: 51.7553°N 0.6666°W

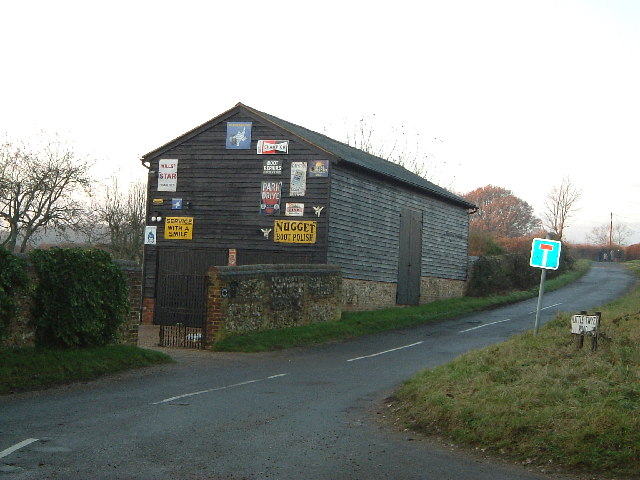
- Nethercott's Barn

- Location within Buckinghamshire
- Population: 8
- OS grid reference: SP909069
  - London: 29 miles (47 km)
- Civil parish: Cholesbury-cum-St Leonards
- Unitary authority: Buckinghamshire
- Ceremonial county: Buckinghamshire
- Region: South East
- Country: England
- Sovereign state: United Kingdom
- Post town: Tring
- Postcode district: HP23
- Dialling code: 01494
- UK Parliament: Mid Buckinghamshire
- Website: cholesbury-cum-st leonards

Buckland Common is a hamlet in Buckinghamshire, England. It is located in the Chiltern Hills, 4 miles (6.4 km) east of Wendover and the same distance south of Tring in Hertfordshire with which it shares a boundary. The northern end of the settlement is delineated by a short section of Grim's Ditch. It is in the civil parish of Cholesbury-cum-St Leonards.

== Early settlement ==
=== Prehistoric ===
Evidence of prehistoric settlement has been found in the form of a Palaeolithic handaxe found on a ploughed field'. A section of the Chiltern Grim's Ditch linear earthwork, which is believed to have been constructed during the Iron Age, marks the northern boundary of Buckland Common. Though what remains is eroded and only a poorly preserved ditch and bank are still visible.

=== Medieval ===
The area today called Buckland Common had in Edward the Confessor's time been the southern and upland part of the manor of Buckland which was under the control of the see of Dorchester. Following the Norman Invasion, Buckland had become incorporated into the estates owned by the Church of Lincoln. This upland area would have originally comprised impenetrable scrub woodland but gradual clearance created pasture land which provided advantageous grazing for cattle and sheep. Perhaps this location was chosen on account of it being more sheltered lying as it does in a slight depression in comparison to the surrounding land. It is believed the first permanent settlement began in the 16th century, around the time when Henry VIII seized the lands from the Earl of Warwick in 1522.

=== Post medieval period ===
Around 1540, Queen Mary I granted a tenancy to Sir Anthony Browne, whose daughter Elizabeth married Baron Richard Dormer a wealthy landowner from Wing. Richard's descendant the First Earl of Carnarvon was killed during the English Civil War at the first Battle of Newbury. The Parliamentarians sequestrated the lands around 1653 although they were subsequently restored to the Carnarvon estate in the 1700s. By marriage it passed to the Chesterfield family and was held by Philip Stanhope, 5th Earl of Chesterfield in 1813. After his death it passed into private hands and was owned by the Lord of the Manor, Peter Parrot.

== Industry and economy ==
Evidence from pottery shards and a number of kilns have been found dating industrial activity to before 1700. These made use of local clay deposits from clay pits, of which a number of which have been identified, to make pottery with a distinctive manganese-brown. This activity contributed to the development of the settlement during the first part of the 18th century. Fine examples of this pottery are to be found in the nearby Chequers Museum. Though this pottery production then ceased clay continued to be dug to support a thriving brick making industry which survived into the 20th century. Agriculture provided the main employment during the 19th and first half of the 20th centuries, though a cider factory which opened in the 1900s was for a time also an important part of the local economy.

This increasing industry also supported at least three beer houses. The oldest of these and first licensed in 1698 was The Boot, which in 1864 was renamed The Boot and Slipper and remained in business until 1976. The Britannia Pub's early history is unknown but was the first to close in 1939. The Rose and Crown, licensed in 1863, changed its name in 1967 to The Horse and Hounds before ceasing to trade in 1984. All three are now private properties.

== Development of the settlement ==
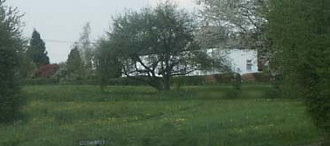
The Green at Buckland Common

Establishment of the village of Buckland Common happened much later than other similar daughter settlements in this part of the Chilterns. The schism was eventually hastened by the action of the Commissioners for Enclosure in 1842 who oversaw the dividing up of the 15 acres (6.1 ha) of common land between villagers, enabling the creation of a largely autonomous community. All that remained of the once extensive common was a small rectangular allotment of land. The plot was heavily depreciated through clay and gravel extraction during the 18th and 19th centuries and it was used as a rubbish tip up until the 1950s. During the 1960s restoration work was undertaken to enable it to be used for recreation purposes and was given protection through its registration as common land. Known today as The Green it is owned and maintained by the Parish Council "for the enjoyment of local people".

The Rothschild family were prominent farmers and landowners. Around 1920 they were responsible for improving the tied cottages of their farm workers by building, in typical Rothschild style, two new terraces of cottages along Little Twye Road and replacing dilapidated tenements in Parrotts Lane.

Prior to 1860, Buckland Common did not have its own church, being technically part of Buckland Parish. From this time it had a Strict Baptist Chapel, followed by a rapidly built wooden Anglican chapel of ease commissioned specifically to counter the impact of the non-conformist mission. The church was unable to sustain a congregation, was decommissioned and eventually was pulled down in about 1939. The Baptist Chapel continued but was converted to a private dwelling in the 1980s. The graveyard of the Baptist church remains open and is owned by the Grace Baptist Association.

Before 1973 primary school age children from the village attended St Leonards National School in the nearby village of that name, which was founded in 1860. Since the closure of the school children attend Hawridge and Cholesbury Church of England School in Hawridge.

== Governance ==
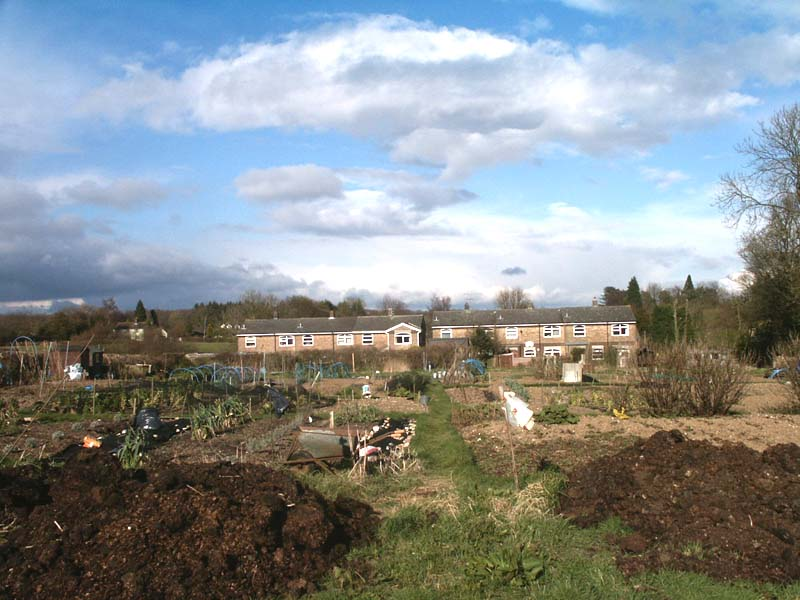
Buckland Common Allotments

Until 1934 Buckland Common remained a remote part of Buckland Parish known as 'Upper Buckland'. Together with Cholesbury, Hawridge and St Leonards, which are locally known as hilltop villages it now forms part of Cholesbury-cum-St Leonards civil parish. The parish council purchased land in 1974 which it divided into allotments for parishioners. Adjacent to this a small development of public housing was built at the same time.

== Notable people ==
Roland Beamont (August 1920 – November 2001), RAF fighter pilot and experimental test pilot stayed for a short period in Buckland Common during 1945. His first wife, Shirley, is buried nearby in the churchyard at St Leonards, Buckinghamshire.
