= Marsworth =

Village in Buckinghamshire, England

Coordinates: 51.8225°N 0.6661°W

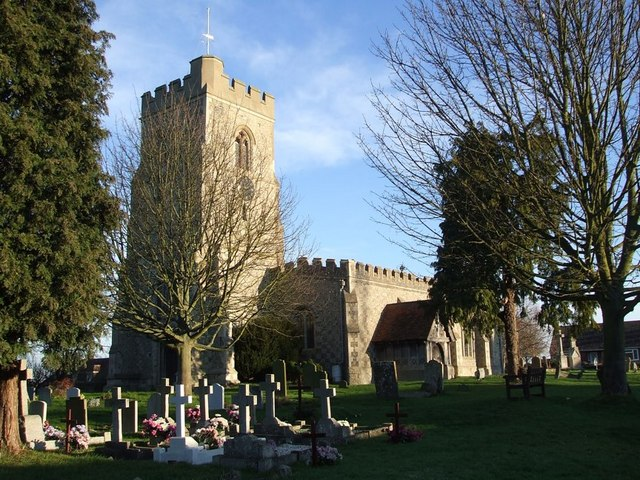
- All Saints' Church, Marsworth

- Location within Buckinghamshire
- Population: 741 (2011 Census)
- OS grid reference: SP920145
- Civil parish: Marsworth
- Unitary authority: Buckinghamshire
- Ceremonial county: Buckinghamshire
- Region: South East
- Country: England
- Sovereign state: United Kingdom
- Post town: TRING
- Postcode district: HP23
- Dialling code: 01296
- Police: Thames Valley
- Fire: Buckinghamshire
- Ambulance: South Central
- UK Parliament: Aylesbury
- Website: Marsworth Parish Website

Marsworth is a village and a civil parish within the unitary authority area of Buckinghamshire, England. It is about 2 miles (3.2 km) north of Tring, Hertfordshire and 6 miles (9.7 km) east of Aylesbury.

== Early history ==
The village name is Anglo Saxon in origin, Mæssanwyrth, and means 'Mæssa's enclosure'. Marsworth is first mentioned in the will of Aelfgyfu (before 975) as granted to Edgar of England who in turn passed it to St Etheldreda's Church in London (belonging to the Bishops of Ely), and later passed into the hands of Brictric, a thegn of Edward the Confessor. After the Norman Conquest Marsworth (Missevorde) is recorded in the Domesday Book of 1086 as being in the possession of Robert D'Oyly and was connected to Wallingford, an association which continued into the 17th century. The tenants at this time were the Bassett family and the land was split between six sisters, and through their line the estates passed to the Goldingtons, at which time the manor becomes recorded as Marsworth with Goldringtons.

By 1319 records show there were still several overlords controlling various parts of Marsworth including a descendant of Isabel Bassett, John de Beauchamp Lord of the manor at Hawridge. This is the first indication of a tie-up between Marsworth and the detached manor or Hawridge, possibly to provide woodland and hilltop summer pasture for the estate across the narrow isthmus of Hertfordshire.

There were connections between another estate in Marsworth and the Savoy Hospital in London, to which the Boughton family granted lands in 1514 in the honour of Henry III. It subsequently became an endowment for St Thomas' Hospital and in 1876 was swapped for lands in Essex by William Brown of Tring.

There are records of a church in Marsworth since the 12th century. All Saints' Church was further extended in the 14th and 15th centuries. Despite further restoration in the first part of the 19th century, by 1880 the church was in poor condition and the newly appointed vicar, the Rev. F. W. Ragg, set about with the help of parishioners to restore it over the next 25 years.

== Marsworth today ==
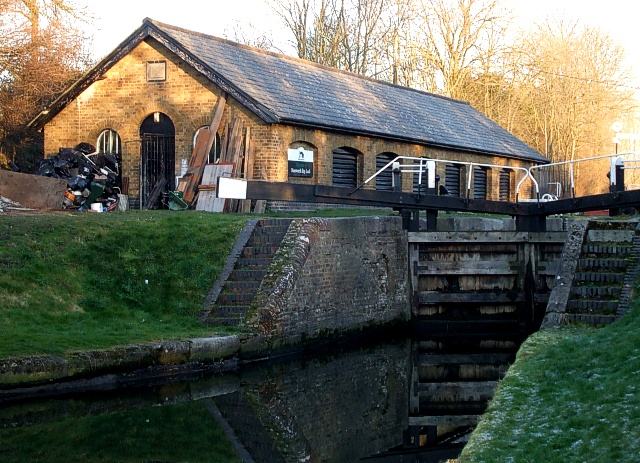
Marsworth Top Lock

The construction of the Grand Union Canal, which passes through Marsworth brought with it many new business opportunities and the village expanded greatly as a result. Within the parish boundary of Marsworth, to the south of the main village where the canal cross the Lower Icknield Way is the hamlet of Startop's End. In 2010 the during building work engineers dug up over 40 bodies in un-marked graves which were subsequently interred in a ceremony conducted by the vicar. Nearby are three of the four Tring Reservoirs, one of which is named Marsworth reservoir.
