= Hawridge =

Village in Buckinghamshire, England

Coordinates: 51.7449°N 0.6248°W

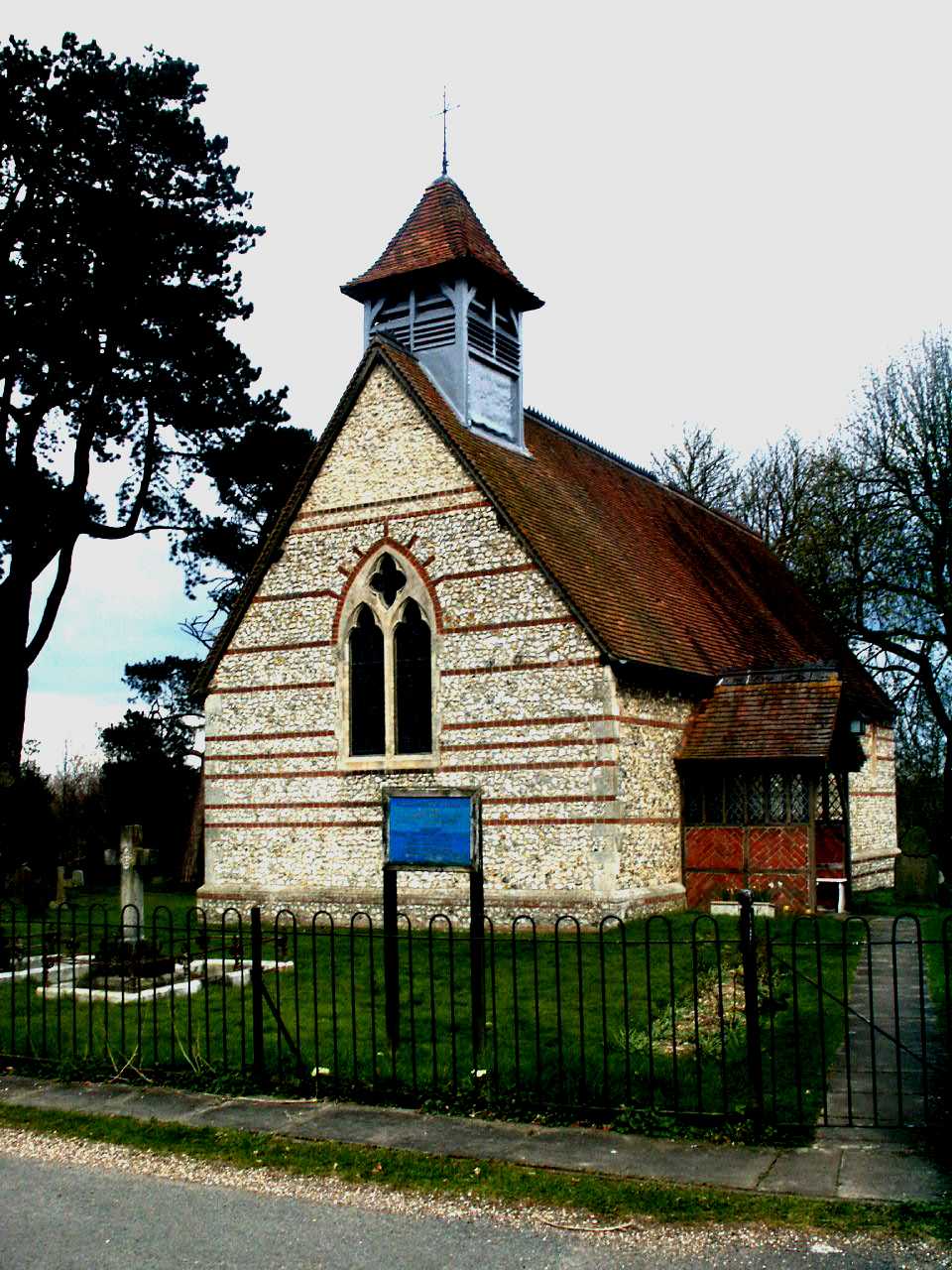
- St Mary's Church, Hawridge

- Location within Buckinghamshire
- OS grid reference: SP950060
  - London: 27 miles
- Civil parish: Cholesbury-cum-St Leonards
- Unitary authority: Buckinghamshire
- Ceremonial county: Buckinghamshire
- Region: South East
- Country: England
- Sovereign state: United Kingdom
- Post town: Chesham
- Postcode district: HP5
- Dialling code: 01494
- UK Parliament: Mid Buckinghamshire
- Website: Cholesbury-cum-St Leonards

Hawridge (/ˈhærɪdʒ/ HA-rij; recorded as Hoquerug in the 12th century) is a small village in the Chilterns in the county of Buckinghamshire, England and bordering the county boundary with Hertfordshire. It is 3 miles (4.8 km) from Chesham, 4 miles (6.4 km) from both Tring and Berkhamsted. Hawridge is one of four villages making up Cholesbury-cum-St Leonards, a civil parish.

It is a rural community but the agricultural economy is small and most local people rely for employment on neighbouring towns, the proximity of London, the availability of broadband technology or local tourism and the popularity of the area for recreational activities.

== Geography ==
Before the incorporation of additional land from adjacent parishes, Hawridge historically comprised some 696 acres (2.82 km^{2}). It is located in the main along a ridge on the dip slope within the Chiltern downland landscape. It is some 590 ft (182 m) above sea level.

=== Geology ===
The geology of the area has dictated the land use. The soil comprises gravely clay, intermixed with flints, small pebbles, and öolite over a chalk formation. Several examples of puddingstones a characteristic form of this aggregate have been found locally. There are no streams in the area due to the porous chalk sub soil. In places the occurrence of clay close to the surface accounts for several natural ponds fed by springs. Until connection with mains water in the mid-20th century, the scarcity of water had necessitated the sinking of deep wells and capture of rainwater.

=== Land use ===
In contrast to nearby areas of the Chilterns more land is given over to open space i.e. agricultural, both arable and pasture; paddocks; heathland and most significantly the Common along one side of which the majority of houses are arranged. There is relatively little mature ancient woodland remaining as most was cleared mainly during the 18th century and given over to beech plantation connected with the furniture making industry in High Wycombe. Both chalk and a small amount of clay have been extracted over the years, Meanwhile, in more recent times flint was dug out for road making. Both activities have left their mark in the form of small mounds and shallow depressions.

Historically, many homes had access to orchards, gardens for vegetable production and pasture for domestic animals. These have largely disappeared and over the last ten years or so the increasing popularity of horse riding has created a demand for suitable land for paddocks.

=== Settlement ===
Villages in this part of the Chilterns are often set out around Greens and Commons or strung out along ridges with which they connect often without a gap to adjacent settlements. Despite being not far distant from Chesham, Hawridge is consequently more closely linked in this way with the neighbouring villages of Cholesbury, St Leonards and Buckland Common. Heath End is a hamlet which has always been closely associated with Hawridge although historically part of the settlement had been in Hertfordshire until the second half of 20th century. The name probably derives from its location on the edge of Wigginton Heath.

Until 1935 Hawridge did not have mains water. Drainage did not arrive until 1963. The road down to Chesham was frequently impassable in winter and periodic flooding has still occurred even in recent years. The Second World War resulted in an influx of people escaping the London Blitz and not returning afterwards. This migration had a lasting effect with more houses built or greatly enlarged or refurbished. Transport improvements enabling daily commuting to London from the 1950s onwards also led to a further change with the growth in more affluent families which irrevocably changed the composition of the village community.

Concerns in the 1960s about uncontrolled housing development encouraged the establishment of resident's groups focussed on preserving the village scene. Situated in the Chilterns AONB, and combined with national and local government planning controls there is strict enforcement of restrictions on residential building developments. This has led to a shortage in affordable and social housing. The scarcity of available property has added a premium onto house prices in Hawridge (average selling price circa £700k as at 2007) and neighbouring villages compared to other areas in the rest of the South-east of England.

== History ==
=== Early settlement ===
==== Prehistoric ====
There is evidence of prehistoric settlement from archaeological finds, including a Palaeolithic handaxe found at the hamlet of Heath End, having probably arrived with road materials transported to the site. Mesolithic and neolithic tranchet axe-heads were found near Haddens Plantation and Heath End Farm. From finds such as a late Bronze Age sword, now at the Ashmolean Museum, Oxford it has been concluded that there was a permanent settlement in the area from around 600BC.

==== Anglo-Saxon ====
The original village name Aucrug is Anglo Saxon in origin, and means ridge frequented by hawks. There is evidence of trading activity through finds of coins spanning from around 4th Century, the late Roman period of Valentinian I, and about 1540 during the reign of Edward VI, though the precise dating of these coins is debated.

==== Medieval ====
Adjacent to White Hawridge Bottom is evidence of strip lynchets and terraces built around 11th century. Lynchets are the result of ploughing accumulating earth on the lowest point of the slope and building up a terrace of flatter ground on square or rectangular early medieval fields. At Hawridge Court there is a medieval manor house dating from the 13th century enclosed by earlier ringwork, comprising a single rampart and ditch.

=== English Civil War ===
Hawridge is said to have associations with the English Civil War during the 1640s Parliamentary soldiers were billeted in the area at a time when skirmishes were occurring in and around Wendover and Chesham. Adjacent to Horseblock Lane, which crosses Hawridge Common, may have been where their horses were quartered. It has also been said that during one particularly fierce skirmish with the Royalists, dead horses were used to form a barricade from which the name of the lane is derived.

=== Lords of the Manor ===
The manor of Hawridge is not mentioned in the Domesday Book. The first attributed with ownership of the lands was Robert D'Oyly, who died in 1091, and following a period of major land reassignment the manor appears to have been granted to Henry de Beaumont, 1st Earl of Warwick and remained with successive Earls of Warwick. The first records show from the 13th century the manor was associated with John de Beauchamp a relative of the Earl of Warwick. Around 1319 and through connections between the de Beauchamp family it became connected to one of the estates held by the Bassetts in Marsworth. By 1379 the manor had passed to Edward or Edmund Cook who gave it up to pay off debts.

The Penyston family held the manor from the beginning of the 15th century and it stayed with the family for 150 years until when Thomas Penyston died it passed to Thomas Tasburgh in 1572, who would later become MP for the county of Buckingham. His wife Dorothy acquired some notoriety for her gerrymandering of elections at Aylesbury. By 1650 and following several conveyances between the Dell, Blackwell and Wright families, the manor was in the hands of John Seare. From the beginning of the 18th century his son Richard owned jointly the manors of Hawridge and Cholesbury – an arrangement which has continued until today. The manorial rights were acquired by Robert Dayrell in 1748 and remained in the control of absentee landlords until the end of the 19th century. Henry Turner, a J.P. was the first Lord of the Manor to reside in the locality for 300 years when in 1899 he took up residency at Braziers End House in Cholesbury. A tradition continued since by the seven Lords of the Manor in the 20th/21st centuries

The Manorial Court which had ceased to operate during the early 19th century as the Church Vestry and later parish meetings held greater sway, was revived by Henry Turner. Held quarterly at the Full Moon, there are records of frequent fines for such misdeeds as turning out animals on the Common or removing from it wood or stone without permission. The manorial rights originating from the 12th century, which have continued to be held jointly with Cholesbury since 17th century no longer control village life. Hawridge and Cholesbury Commons Preservation Society now manage the Commons on behalf of the Lord of the Manor.

== Local economy ==
Like the neighbouring village of Cholesbury, Hawridge with its extensive commons was on an important droving route. There were once several alehouses located close to the Common. They were able to flourish due to this boost in trade between the 18th and later on when up until the early part of the 20th centuries they were also frequented by the growing numbers of brickyard and agricultural labourers. The Full Moon Pub, which is closest to the parish boundary with Cholesbury, is recorded as having its first licensed keeper in 1766 although as an unlicensed alehouse it may date back to 1693. Further along the Common is the Rose and Crown, first licensed in 1753. Down Hawridge Vale is the oldest of the three, the Black Horse, which first opened in the mid-17th century. Other alehouses such as the Mermaid, across the road from the 'Moon', came and went but these three have survived to the present day.

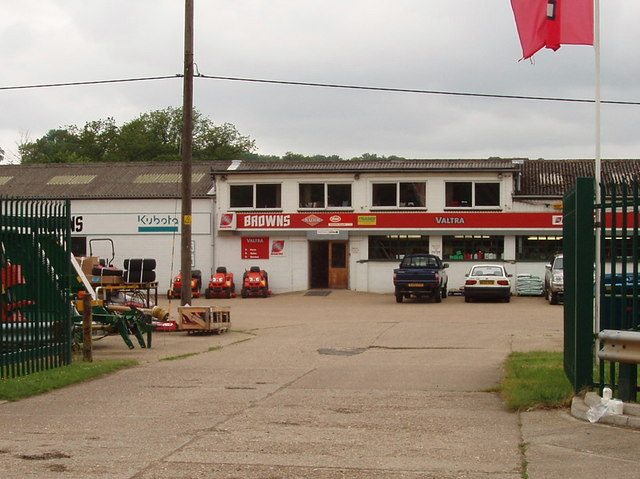
Agricultural merchants

The poor quality of the land though meant that employment for villagers was often of a casual nature. Straw plaiting was the chief occupation of women and children during most of the 19th century. The plait was sent to Luton or London. The availability of daily train services to London also provided income from pheasant rearing. Until the Second World War agriculture had been the principle industry in the area. During the 20th century, much of the land was gradually taken out of agricultural use until today when only a minimal acreage is given over to or cattle and sheep-grazing or arable farming. The relative closeness to Chesham provided opportunity for work within, for example, one of the many mills or boot factories. The arrival of the railway to Chesham during the 1880s, the relative closeness to London and other conurbations and improvement to the road networks and public transport resulted in work being sought from further afield. The village supported a number of small shops until the 1960s when supermarkets and increased car ownership sealed their fate.

Although a few businesses such as an agricultural merchants, a blacksmith and the three pubs continuing to operate today, there are no longer employers of significant numbers of local people within the village itself. In contrast, the 2001 census indicated a further change in employment patterns with increasing numbers of remote workers in Hawridge.

== Demographics ==
The census of 1801 records there were 121 inhabitants in 24 families living in 21 houses in Hawridge. According to the subsequent censuses the population grew rapidly between 1801 and 1861 when it was 276 and then fell back by 1901 to just 209. By 1931 it had again increased to 222.

As at 2001 93.5% of the local people were recorded as of White ethnic origin. Just under 80% declared they were Christians. Some 45% of people were in employment and 21%, a significantly higher proportion than elsewhere in the district, were self-employed and over 15% were retired which was slightly higher than in nearby areas.

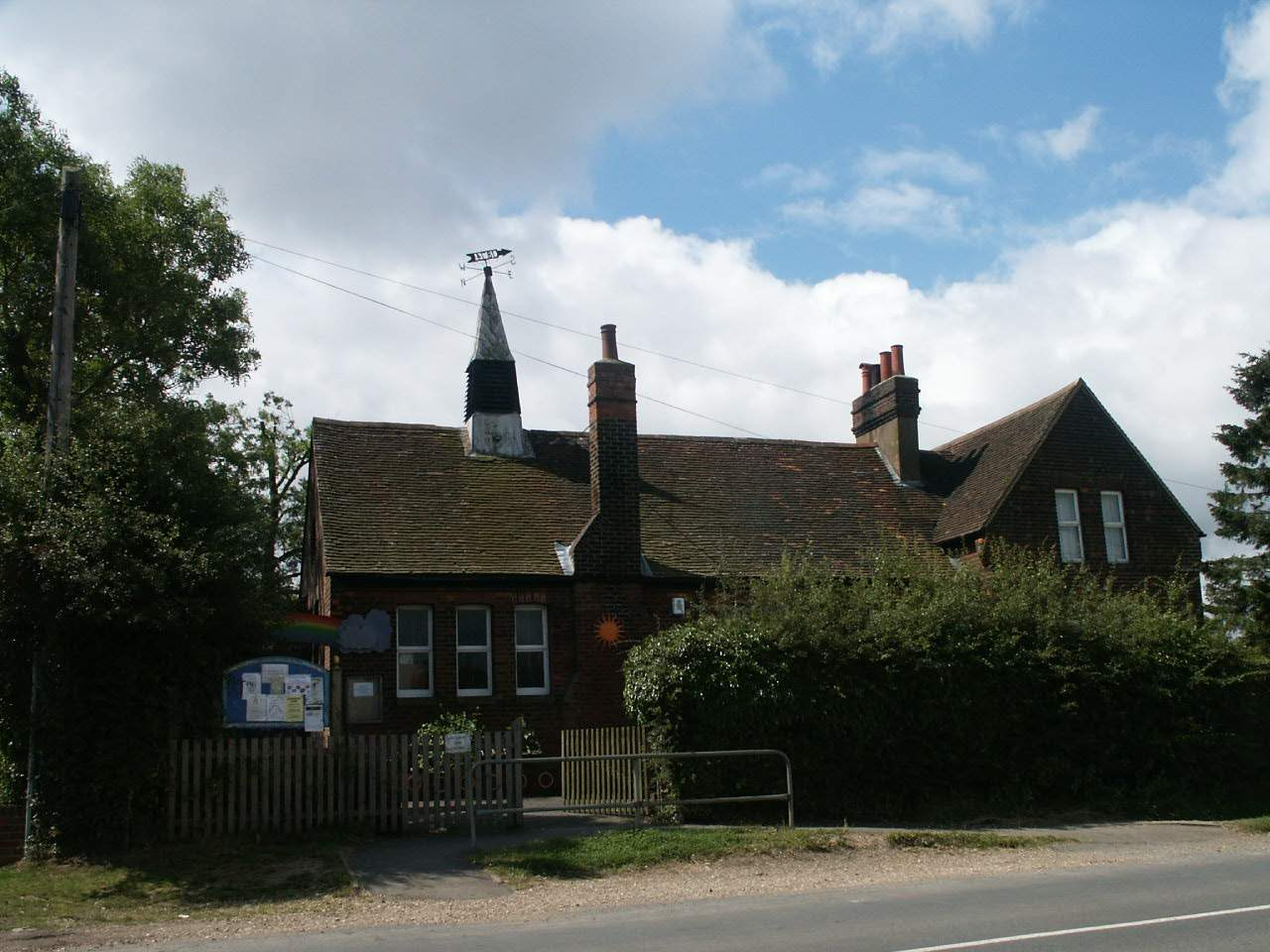
Hawridge and Cholesbury School

== Education ==
Children between the ages of 5 and 11 attend Hawridge and Cholesbury Church of England School. Today the catchment area covers the neighbouring villages of Bellingdon, Cholesbury, St Leonards and Buckland Common (the latter two since the close of the school at St Leonards).

The school was founded as a National School and opened in 1874 on land given by the Lord of the Manor. Before this the only education available was from the 'straw-plait' school, which were a common feature of villages in this part of the Chilterns and were also mentioned in a Select Committee report of 1819. The original school house remained as an integral part of the modern school until 2010 when it was sold and is now a private house.

== Landmarks and buildings ==
A stone obelisk on the boundary between Hawridge and Cholesbury was erected in 1898 to mark Queen Victoria's Diamond Jubilee the year before.

=== Hawridge Mill ===
Hawridge Mill also known as Cholesbury Mill, is a disused tower mill which straddles the boundary between Hawridge and Cholesbury villages. It is now a private residence but was until 1912 in operation and on the site of an earlier smock mill. Residents and visitors in the First World War period included a number of artists and celebrities, including Gilbert Cannan, Mark Gertler, Bertrand Russell, and the actress Doris Keane.

=== Hawridge Court ===
The present day Hawridge Court, a private property, contains the location of the original medieval manor house which was surrounded by a ringwork, now designated a Scheduled Monument. The ringwork was most likely constructed shortly after the Norman Conquest though some archaeological features point to it having a much earlier, prehistoric origin. It is oval in shape measuring 60×50 metres in diameter, is bounded by a rampart 16 metres wide and between two and five metres high and an external ditch which includes a deep moat for part of its circumference. A gap and causeway marks the probable original entrance. On the outside there is a moat, also dated to the medieval period, which almost surrounds the ramparts The original manor house, built by 1223, was replaced by an 18th-century Grade II listed, timber-framed farmhouse. All that remains of the original manor buildings is a granary (or possibly pigeon house) relocated inside the plot and converted into a timber and brick cottage during the Tudor period. Additional barns were constructed in the 18th century. Hawridge Court was occupied periodically by the Lord of the Manors of Hawridge and Cholesbury.

=== Pumping Station ===
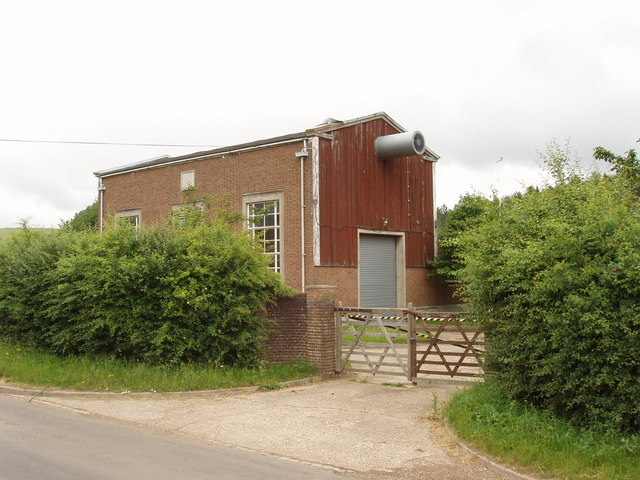
Pumping Station in The Vale

The water-pumping station at Nut Hazel Cross was built in the 1950s to supply water from the aquifer to the growing population in the towns of Halton, Tring and Wendover. Despite enhanced levels of water extraction when groundwater levels remained high the road through The Vale to Chesham, which has always lacked effective drainage was frequently impassable in winter months, and remains prone to flooding today.

== Religion ==
St Mary's Church was first mentioned in 1227. During the 19th century it fell into disrepair and was rebuilt in 1856 by the church architect William White, using original flint-and-brick materials and in a style peculiar to the 1850s known as 'constructional polychromy'. The church has retained its 13th century circular font. Oliver Cromwell ordered that church organs be removed in 1644. Churches relied on bands comprising local musicians to provide accompaniment until organs were reintroduced in the 19th century. An old bassoon made around 1800 and played at St Mary's was found during refurbishment of the church and is now to be found in Buckinghamshire County Museum Aylesbury.

A Baptist church met in a building by Bowmore Farm, at Hawridge which was a branch of the General Baptist Church in Chesham., and later of Akeman Street Baptist Church in Tring. It was mentioned in the 1851 Ecclesiastical Census by closed by the end of the 1800s. The building no longer stands.

In 1876 a small congregation met in a cottage in the village. A Mission Hall was opened for them in 1879 with the help of Naphill Mission Hall and Hope Hall (now Kings Road Evangelical Church), Berkhamsted with the words "The desert shall rejoice, and blossom as the rose" (Isaiah). It closed in 1989 and today the Hall is a private house.

== Transport ==
Almost 95% of local residents have access to a car. Over the years the provision of buses has decreased significantly. Today a bus service runs once each way on alternative days connecting to Chesham, Tring and local villages. School buses are a valuable facility transporting children to Secondary Schools in Chesham and Amersham.

== Sport and recreation ==
The local area with its open views, rural lanes, commons and woodland, criss-crossed by footpaths and bridleways consequently are very popular with cyclists, walkers and horse-riders. The churches of Hawridge and Cholesbury jointly hold a Summer Fête on August Bank Holiday, alternatively on Hawridge and Cholesbury Commons. The Kimblewick Hunt (previously known as Vale of Aylesbury with Garth & South Berks Hunt) traditionally hold a meet on Boxing Day (26 December) which draws a large crowd from the local district. Quoits was played on the Commons up until the 1920s and the Full Moon pub had a Bowling Alley until the 1970s.

== Governance ==
Hawridge together with the neighbouring villages of Cholesbury, St Leonards and Buckland Common are locally known as the Hilltop Villages. From 1896 the church vestry has been succeeded by the parochial church council focussing on church affairs and its responsibilities for the administration of village matters progressively ceded to Hawridge parish council. Hawridge remained a separate parish until 1 April 1934 when it came together with the other villages to form the civil parish of Cholesbury cum St Leonards and became part of Amersham Rural District which as part of the 1974 Local Government reorganisation was succeeded by Chiltern district. In 2021 Chiltern was abolished and Hawridge became part of Buckinghamshire unitary district.

== Notable people ==
- Angela and sister Hermione Baddeley, both screen and stage actors lived next door to fellow actor Milton Rosmer in the 1930s
- Milton Rosmer English stage actor, film director and screenwriter lived in the village from the 1930s
- Margaretta Scott English actor of stage, film and television (1912–2005) lived in the village with her husband Composer John Wooldridge, daughter actor Susan Wooldridge and son theatre producer Hugh Wooldridge during the 1950s
- Thomas Tasburgh (1554–1602) lived the early years of his life at Hawridge Court. He was Lord of the Manor of Hawridge from 1572 to 1600 and was also MP for Buckinghamshire, Aylesbury and Chipping Wycombe
- Alpin Errol Thomson, born 1893 in Perth, Australia, played rugby union for Scotland in 1921, and first-class cricket for Somerset County Cricket Club in 1922 and 1923 and for a first-class Royal Navy team. He subsequently lived at Hawridge Place until his death on 6 March 1960
- Ed Wright, born 1980 digital musician/composer and educator, grew up in Hawridge
