= Drayton Beauchamp =

Village in Buckinghamshire, England

Coordinates: 51.801°N 0.693°W

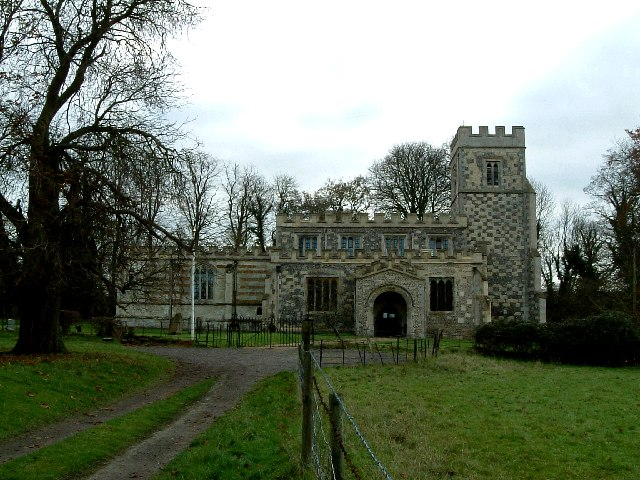
- St. Mary the Virgin parish church

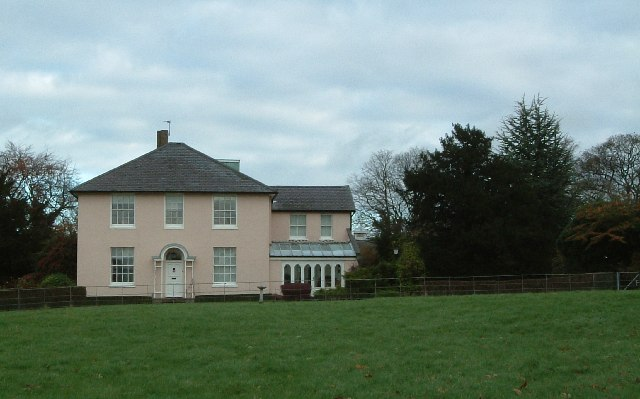
- The Old Rectory

- Location within Buckinghamshire
- Population: 152 (2011 Census)
- OS grid reference: SP9012
- Civil parish: Drayton Beauchamp
- Unitary authority: Buckinghamshire
- Ceremonial county: Buckinghamshire
- Region: South East
- Country: England
- Sovereign state: United Kingdom
- Post town: Aylesbury
- Postcode district: HP22
- Police: Thames Valley
- Fire: Buckinghamshire
- Ambulance: South Central

Drayton Beauchamp (pronounced 'Beecham') is a village and civil parish within Aylesbury Vale district in Buckinghamshire, England. It is in the east of the county bordering Hertfordshire, about six miles from Aylesbury and two miles from Tring.

== History ==
The village toponym is derived from the Old English for "farm where sledges are used". It is a common place name in England, and refers to places that were perched on the hillside, thus requiring the use of a sledge rather than a cart to pull heavy loads. The suffix 'Beauchamp' refers to the ancient manorial family of the parish. The village is intersected by the Icknield Way a prehistoric, long-distance trackway of significant importance in providing a trading route between East Anglia and the Thames Valley certainly during the Iron Age and maybe earlier. In more recent times it has been bisected by the Roman Road, Akeman Street now the A41 and by both the Aylesbury Arm and Wendover Arm of the Grand Union Canal.

Following the Norman conquest of England William I awarded land which later became known as Drayton Beauchamp to Robert, Earl of Morton who as Magno le Breton had accompanied William at the time of the Norman Invasion in 1066. The Morton family founded a church at Drayton on the site where the present-day church of St Mary the Virgin now stands. During the early part of the 13th century the manor was owned by William de Beauchamp (de Bello Campo). The lands were passed from the Beauchamp family to the Cobhams. Sir John Cobham gave the property to King Edward III. The King granted it to his shield-bearer Thomas Cheney (also spelt Cheyne) in 1364. It remained in the Cheyne family until the death of William Cheyne, Lord Viscount Newhaven in 1728.

During the period after 1066 in which the Lord of the manor of Drayton was Magno le Breton the southern end of the manor would have been valued for its summer pasture. This area which became known later as Cholesbury contained a large Iron Age Hillfort. This gradually became a permanent settlement and was subsequently separated off as a separate manor. In 1541 it was sold by Robert Cheyne to Chief Justice John Baldwin and became an autonomous manor.

Drayton Beauchamp was sold by the Cheyne family to John Gumley in 1728 for £22,200 and in 1788 the Lordship of the Manor was inherited by Lady Robert Manners. The manor house beside the church had been demolished around 1760 and a new one built elsewhere in the parish by the Gumleys. In 1835 the Lordship of the Manor passed to Mrs. Caroline Jenney and remained in that family until the death of Miss Airmyne Harpur-Crewe in 1999.

== Parish church of St Mary ==
The parish church was extensively rebuilt in the 15th century from materials salvaged from an earlier church. Most notable is the Norman font which dates back to the 12th century. The first rector of the new Church was Richard Hooker who took up his incumbency in 1584. Richard is today remembered for his writings—in particular a four-volume work known as Of the Lawes of Ecclesiastical Politie.

The church was again restored in 1867 when the rector was the parson-naturalist, Henry Harpur Crewe.

In 1934 Drayton Beauchamp ceded a small parcel of land, adjacent to the previously detached parish of Cholesbury to the new parish of Cholesbury-cum-St Leonards.
