= Margaret Lowenfeld =

British child psychologist

Margaret Frances Jane Lowenfeld
- Born: Margaret Lowenfeld; 4 February 1890; Knightsbridge, London, England
- Died: 2 February 1973 (aged 82); St John's Wood, London, England
- Resting place: St Lawrence's Church, Cholesbury, Buckinghamshire
- Education: Royal Free Hospital, Royal Hospital for Sick Children, Glasgow
- Occupations: Medical practitioner, researcher and trainer
- Known for: Pioneer in developmental psychology and play therapy
- Parent(s): Henry Lowenfeld, Alice Evans

Margaret Frances Jane Lowenfeld (4 February 1890 – 2 February 1973) was a British pioneer of child psychology and play therapy, a medical researcher in paediatric medicine, and an author of several publications and academic papers on the study of child development and play. Lowenfeld developed a number of educational techniques which bear her name and although not mainstream, have achieved international recognition.

== Early years ==
Margaret Lowenfield was born in Lowndes Square in Knightsbridge, London on 4 February 1890, as their second daughter, to a British mother and Polish father. Her father, Henry Lowenfeld from a wealthy family, had arrived in England in the early 1880s, apparently penniless from Silesia. He married Alice Evans, in 1884. He soon became a wealthy businessman through several ventures, such as buying up rundown theatres in the West End of London and starting the Kops Brewery in Fulham, selling non-alcoholic beer as the temperance movement took hold. Lowenfeld was educated at Cheltenham Ladies College, England, with her older sister, Helena Rosa Wright who went on to be an influential figure in birth control and family planning.

== Career ==
=== Medical training and Polish mission work ===
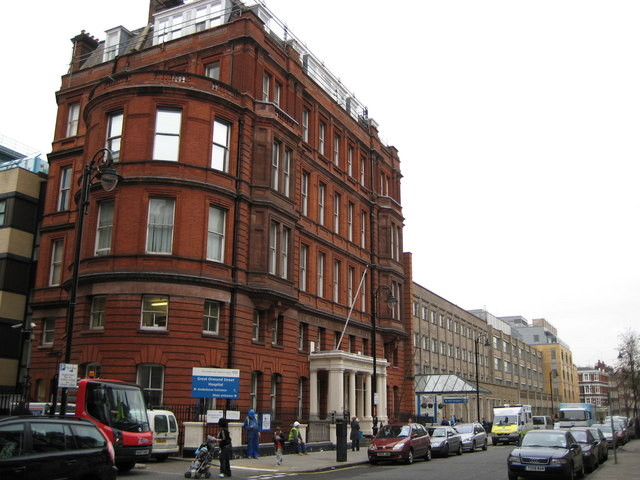
Great Ormond Street Hospital for Sick Children where Margaret worked for a short period.

Lowenfeld followed her sister into the London Royal Free Hospital School of Medicine for Women in Bloomsbury, London. By the outbreak of World War I, she had passed the minimum requirement to practice medicine, In 1914 she got a job at the Royal Free Hospital followed by a short period at the Hospital for Sick Children, Great Ormond Street. In 1917 she got the MRCS (Eng.) and LRCP (Lond.) and the MB, BS (Lond.). In 1918 she became a house surgeon at the South London Hospital for Women.

Further training was interrupted when in late 1918 she joined a mission to Poland, as Medical Officer for the British Typhus Unit. She also worked with the American YMCA assisting the Polish Army and POW department in stemming infectious diseases in her father's ancestral town of Chrzanów. The health of the children was a major influence on her later career as she speculated about the different outcomes in spite of their traumatic experiences. Lowenfeld returned to England briefly as war broke out between Poland and Russia. She went on to Warsaw to set up a medical department for prisoners of war and worked on improving sanitation and undertook refugee work.

In 1921 due to her own illness, Lowenfeld returned to London, and came into contact with Wilfred Trotter, a pioneer of both neurosurgery and social psychology. Through this association Lowenfeld developed an interest in psychodynamic psychology as a treatment of shell-shock and learned about the work of Hugh Crichton-Miller who co-founded the Tavistock Clinic. Lowenfeld's limited medical experience in England made it easier to follow a research career. She became a researcher at the Mothercraft Training Centre studying infant health and was influenced by Truby King, a pioneer of childcare. In 1923 she obtained a Medical Research Council fellowship and Muirhead Scholarship to study at the Royal Hospital for Sick Children, Glasgow where she worked on childhood rheumatism. In 1924 she returned to infant feeding with a scholarship at the Royal Free Hospital. She also established a private practice in Queen Anne Street, London, which she kept for the rest of her working life. Alongside this research, between 1926 and 1927 she undertook voluntary work as a medical officer at the newly opened pioneering health centre in South London, known as the Peckham Experiment, a service integrating health and social work to combat inner city deprivation.

=== Child Therapy ===
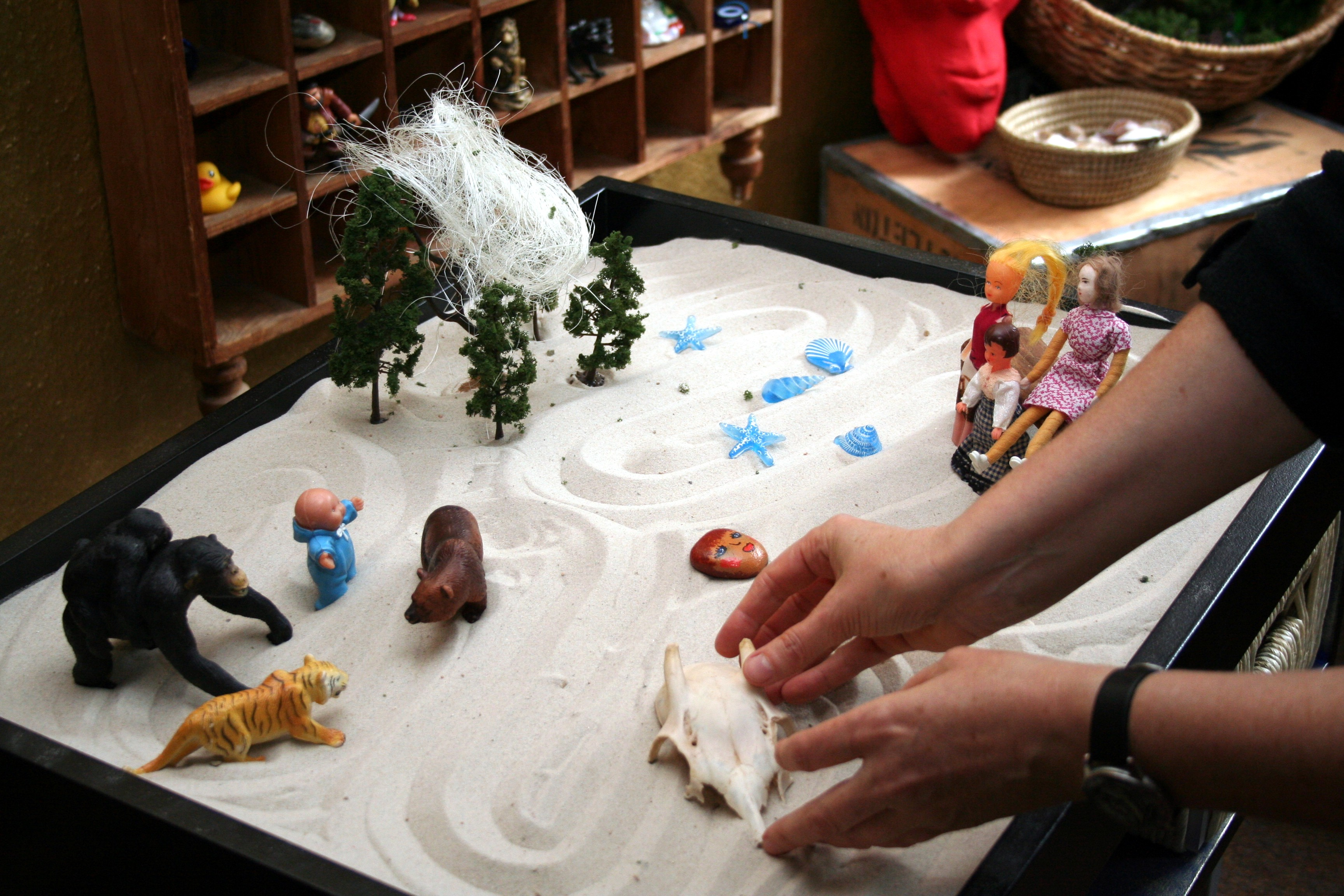
An individual engaging in sandplay therapy.

In 1928 Dr Lowenfeld established the Children's Clinic for the Treatment and Study of Nervous and Difficult Children, one of the first child guidance clinics in Britain, set up in Notting Hill, London. By 1931, it had developed into the 'Institute for Child Psychology' (ICP). The ICP trained child therapists in the use of Lowenfeld's theories and techniques. It was during 1929 that from the use of a sand tray, toys and models that the Lowenfeld World Technique was first established. Lowenfeld wanted to see how children would engage in play to view the childs mind. It was first shown to the psychology community in 1931 and later in 1937 to the British Psychological Society conference it was observed by Carl Gustav Jung who attended the conference. Subsequently, the theories and methods originated by Lowenfeld became the basis of a range of therapeutic techniques, in particular the development of sandplay therapy credited to Dora M. Kalff, a Swiss Jungian analyst, who studied with Dr Lowenfeld.

Lowenfeld's first book on her theories and techniques of child psychotherapy, Play in Childhood, was published in 1935 in the USA where her techniques had become popular, and remains an influential if, not mainstream, work to this day. Lowenfeld's research during the late 1930s was influenced by the work of the English philosopher R. G. Collingwood. Between 1937 and 1938 she presented her theories on child behaviour to the British Psychological Society, for which she received mixed reviews. During World War II the ICP clinic was evacuated to Berkhamsted, Hertfordshire. The ICP was re-established in London after the War, it continued to thrive and eventually became funded by the National Health Service. On the Psychotherapy of Children was an important monograph presented at a conference organised by her at the ICP in 1948. In this the Lowenfeld Mozaic Test was first described. Although Lowenfeld's second important book, The World Technique begun in 1956, was partially completed in 1959, it was not published till 1979, six years after her death.

Floor Games by H. G. Wells

=== Educational research and techniques ===
Lowenfeld was greatly impressed by the work of anthropologist, Margaret Mead whom she met in 1948 and who later influenced Lowenfeld's research on child education and her views on psychoanalysis. The first technique invented and developed by Dr. Lowenfeld, The Lowenfeld World Technique (1929) was influenced by the book Floor Games, created by H. G. Wells in 1911, which she recalled enjoying as a child. The other techniques she created were Lowenfeld Mosaics (1948), Lowenfeld Poleidoblocs (1950s), and Lowenfeld Kaleidoblocs (1960s).

=== Recognition and legacy ===
Margaret Lowenfeld's techniques are featured in a special cabinet in the History of Medicine section at the Science Museum, London and her work is also well represented in a major semi-permanent exhibition at the Museum, 'Mind Your Head', that celebrated the Centenary of the British Psychological Society.

Summarising her legacy, The Dr. Margaret Lowenfeld Trust records it thus:-

Her outstanding contributions sprang from her recognition that play is an important activity in children's development and that language is often an unsatisfactory medium for children to express their experiences. She consequently invented non-verbal techniques that enabled them to convey their thoughts and feelings without resort to words.

Her obituary, published February 1973 in The Times, commented:-

...bringing a brilliant mind to the study of the psychology of children and to devising methods to identify and eliminate anti-social tendencies at a formative stage and release and develop their highest potentials.

It continued that the practical application of her theories by professionals and local authorities had remarkable success with disturbed children and had made a significant contribution to the health of the community. It was also noted that her work had received greater recognition in the United States and the Continent than in the UK.

== Later life ==
After retiring from full-time medical practice, Margaret Lowenfield moved out of London to a house in Cholesbury, Buckinghamshire, which she had purchased back in the 1930s to use as a weekend retreat, following the death of her mother. She was joined there by her longtime colleague from the ICP, Ville Anderson, who became her companion and carer until Lowenfeld's death on 2 February 1973 at St Johns and St Elizabeth's Hospital, London. She is buried alongside her sister and her cousin Gunther and his wife Claire Loewenfeld, at the Church of St Lawrence Cholesbury.

== Selected publications originally by Margaret Lowenfeld ==
- Play in childhood; with a foreword by John Davis. London; New York: Mac Keith Press Distributed by Cambridge University Press. 1991. ISBN 0-901260-84-3.(Originally published in 1935)
- The World Technique. London; Boston : Allen & Unwin: Institute of Child Psychology. 1979. ISBN 0-04-150067-9. (Published posthumously)
- The Work and Aims of the Institute of Child Psychology. London: Institute of Child Psychology. 1977.
- Understanding Children's Sandplay: Lowenfeld's World Technique. Dr Margaret Lowenfeld Trust. 1993.
- The Lowenfeld Mosaic Test. Dr Margaret Lowenfeld Trust. 1994.

== Bibliography ==
- Evens, Barbara (1984) Freedom To Choose – The Life and Work of Dr Helena Wright, Pioneer in Contraception, London : The Bodley Head, ISBN 0-370-30504-3
- Unwin, C and Hood-Williams, J (Eds)(1988) Child psychotherapy, war, and the normal child : selected papers of Margaret Lowenfeld, London : Free Association Books, (ISBN 1853430358)(online edition )
