= Henry Lowenfeld =

Polish-born British entrepreneur and theatrical impresario

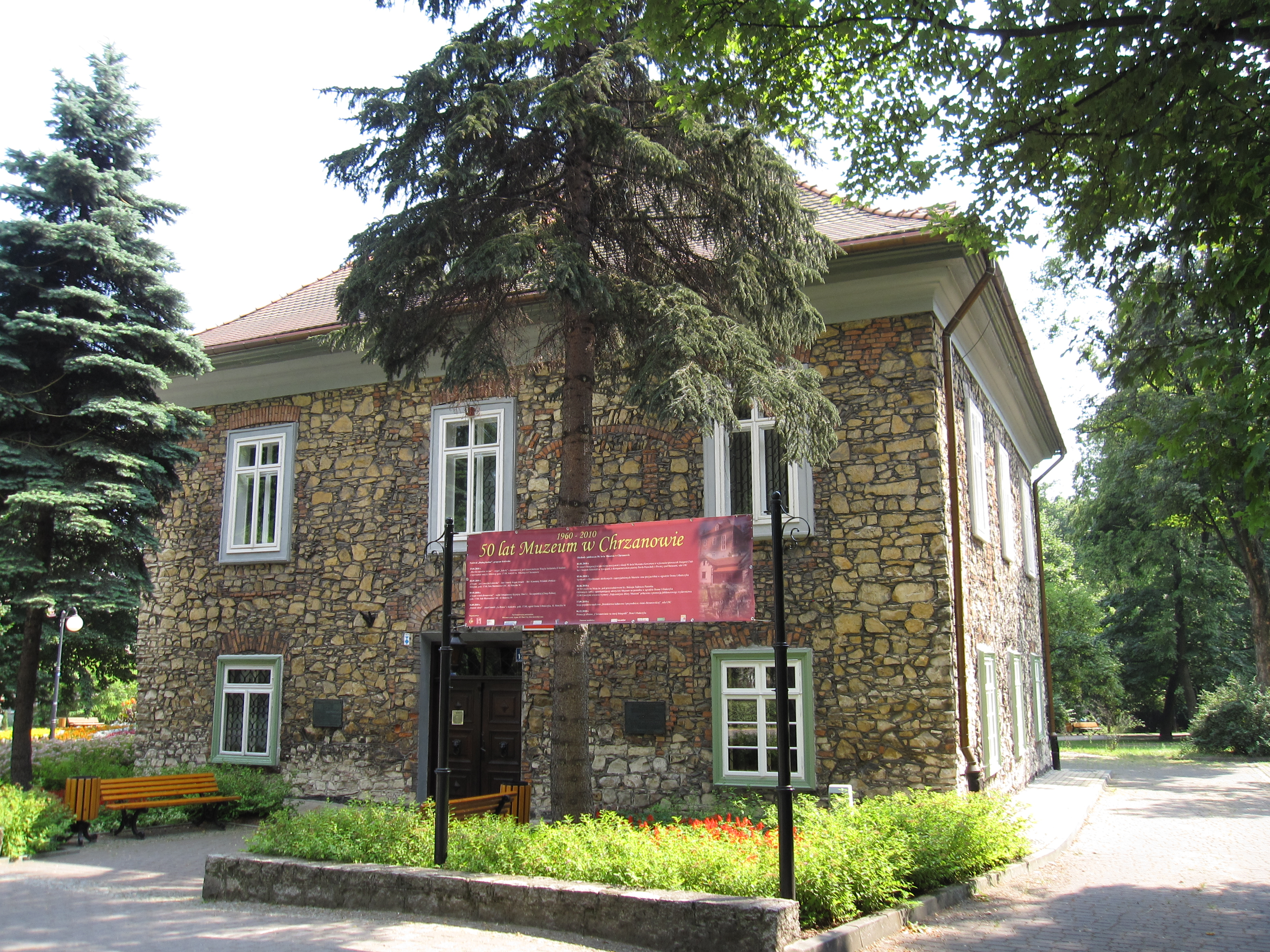
Childhood home in Chrzanów, Poland; now the Irena and Mieczysław Mazaraki Museum

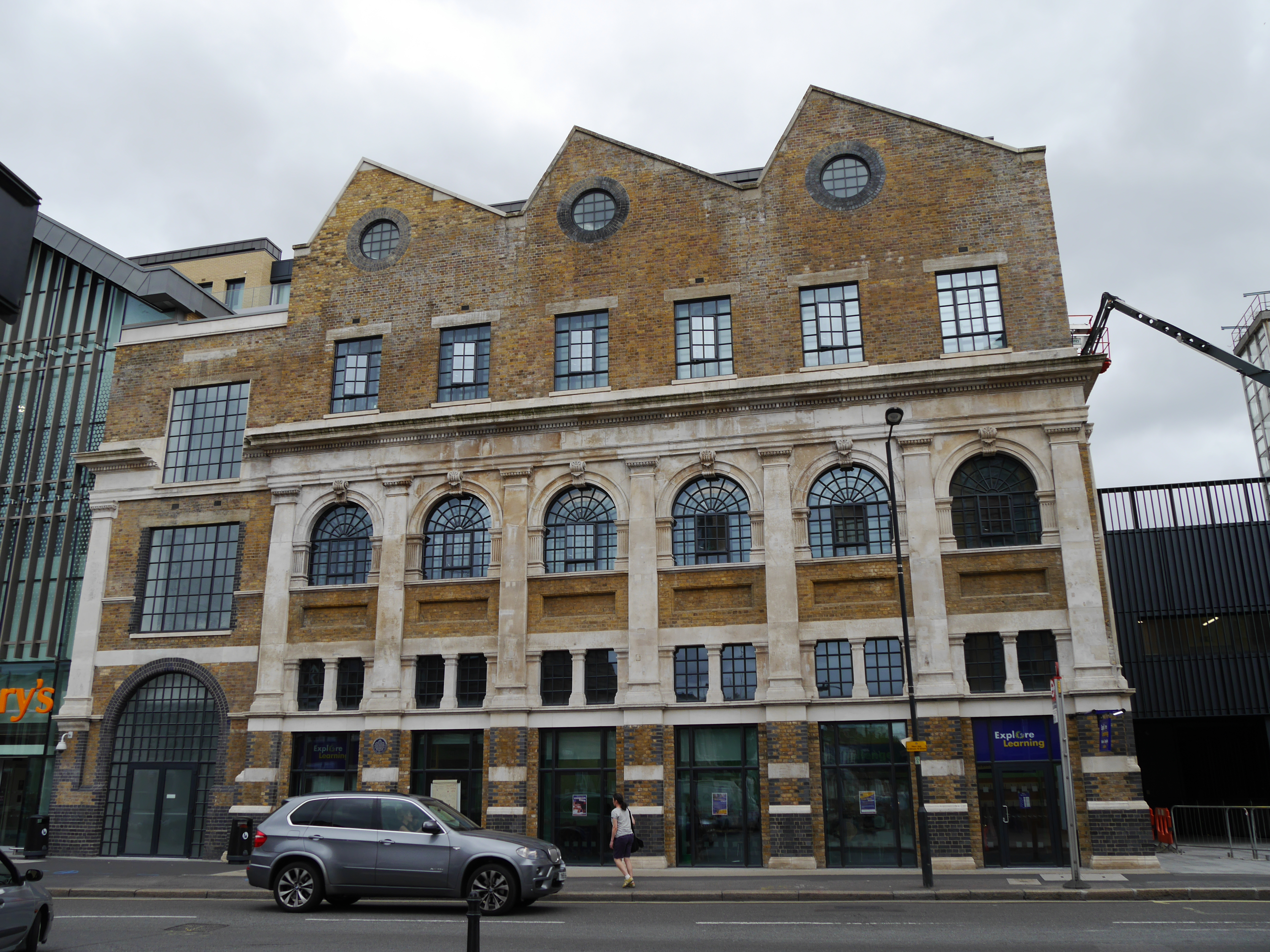
Kops Brewery, Fulham

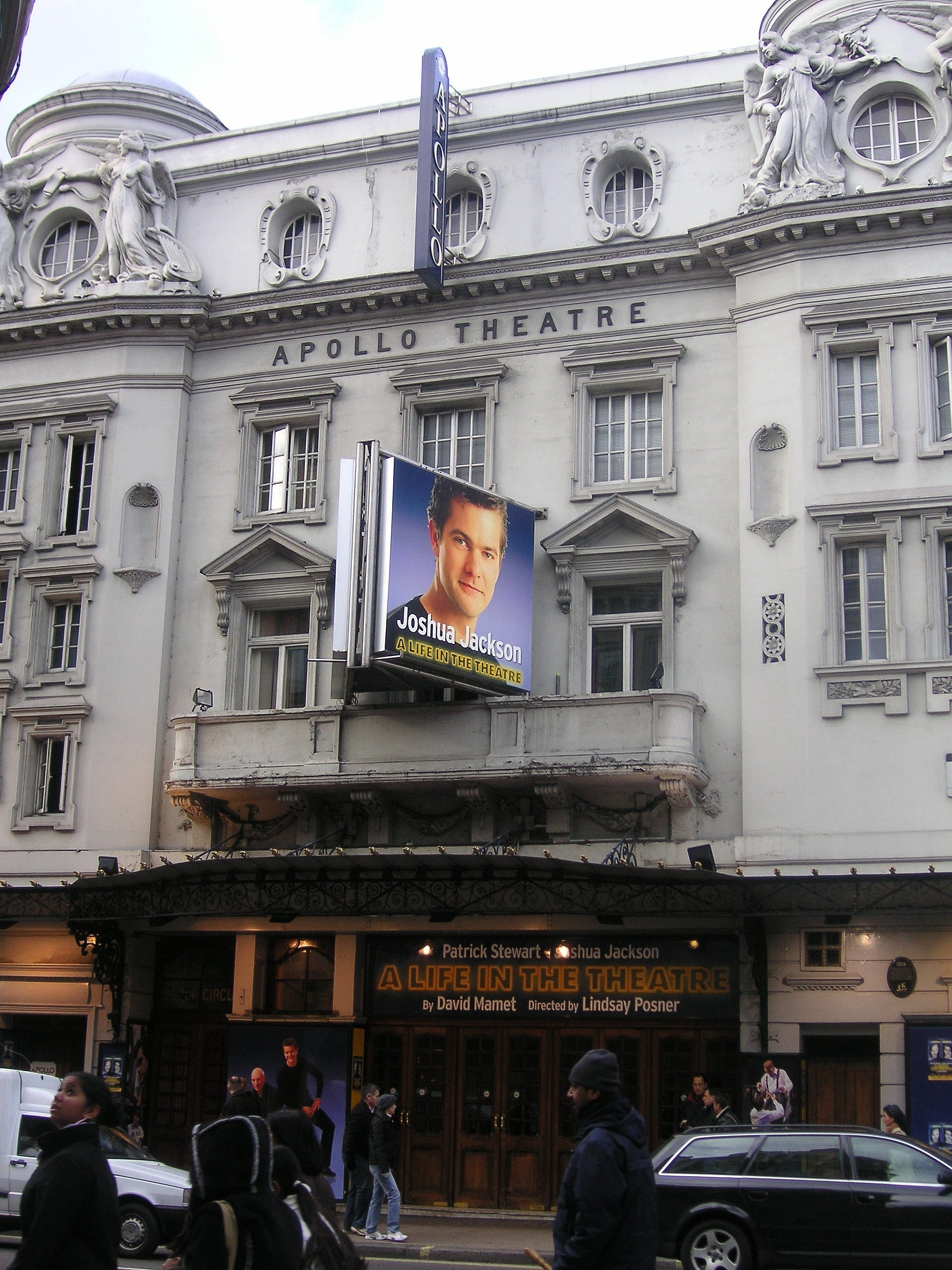
Apollo Theatre, Shaftesbury Avenue, London (2005)

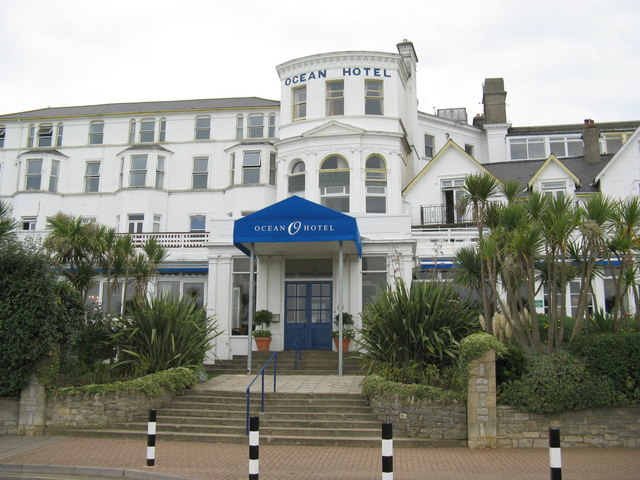
Ocean Hotel, Sandown (2008)

Henry Lowenfeld in Polish, Henryk Loewenfeld, (1 September 1859 – 4 November 1931) was a Polish-born British entrepreneur and theatrical impresario. He founded the Kops Brewery, the UK's first UK brewer of non-alcoholic beer, and built London's Apollo Theatre and the Ocean Hotel in Sandown on the Isle of Wight.

== Early life ==
He was born in Warsaw, the son of a tycoon, Emanuel Loewenfeld and his wife, Rose, who were said to own the town of Chrzanów in Lesser Poland. He emigrated to England in the early 1880s, "with about $10 in his pocket". His childhood home at ul. Mickiewicza 13, Chrzanów, Poland is now the Irena and Mieczysław Mazaraki Museum.

== Career ==
In 1890, Lowenfeld built the Kops Brewery, the UK's first producer of non-alcoholic beer in Townmead Road, Fulham, London. The name of the brewery is thought to have been based on the word "hops". In December 2014, the renovated building received a blue plaque from the Hammersmith & Fulham Historic Buildings Group, stating: "Kops brewed non-alcoholic ales and stouts on an eight-acre site and exported its products throughout the British Empire".

In 1899, he opened the luxury Ocean Hotel, in Sandown, Isle of Wight.

In 1901, Lowenfeld used some land he had bought in the West End for a new theatre designed by the architect Lewin Sharp. It was the Apollo Theatre.

In a letter of 1906 to Siegfried Trebitsch, George Bernard Shaw wrote that Lowenfeld had "made a lot of money in a lucky railway speculation", and used it to enter theatre management, mostly "musical comedy of the vulgarest kind", but that soon after building the Apollo Theatre, he "came to grief and vanished, much discredited". Shaw advised Trebitsch, "You had better not have anything to do with him in the way of business". Shaw also noted that he told Lowenfeld that he was "born to play Napoleon in my Man of Destiny ", and "I rather liked him, in fact". Lowenfeld actually made his fortune from renovating theatres and not from railways. He used the money he made to buy an estate back in Poland.

The Kops Brewery closed during World War I and the building became a margarine factory in 1917.

== Personal life ==
He married Alice Evans. Their elder daughter, Helena Rosa Wright (1887–1982) was a doctor and a pioneer in birth control and family planning and their younger daughter, Margaret Lowenfeld (1890–1973), also a medical doctor, became a pioneer in child psychology and Play therapy. The two daughters were both sent to a Froebel kindergarten and brought up in the Church of England, while the influence of Poland remained important in their childhood and beyond. Both of them attended Cheltenham Ladies College. Lowenfeld's wife was known as a successful society hostess, but the marriage ended in divorce in 1902.

He died in Paris in 1931.

== Legacy ==
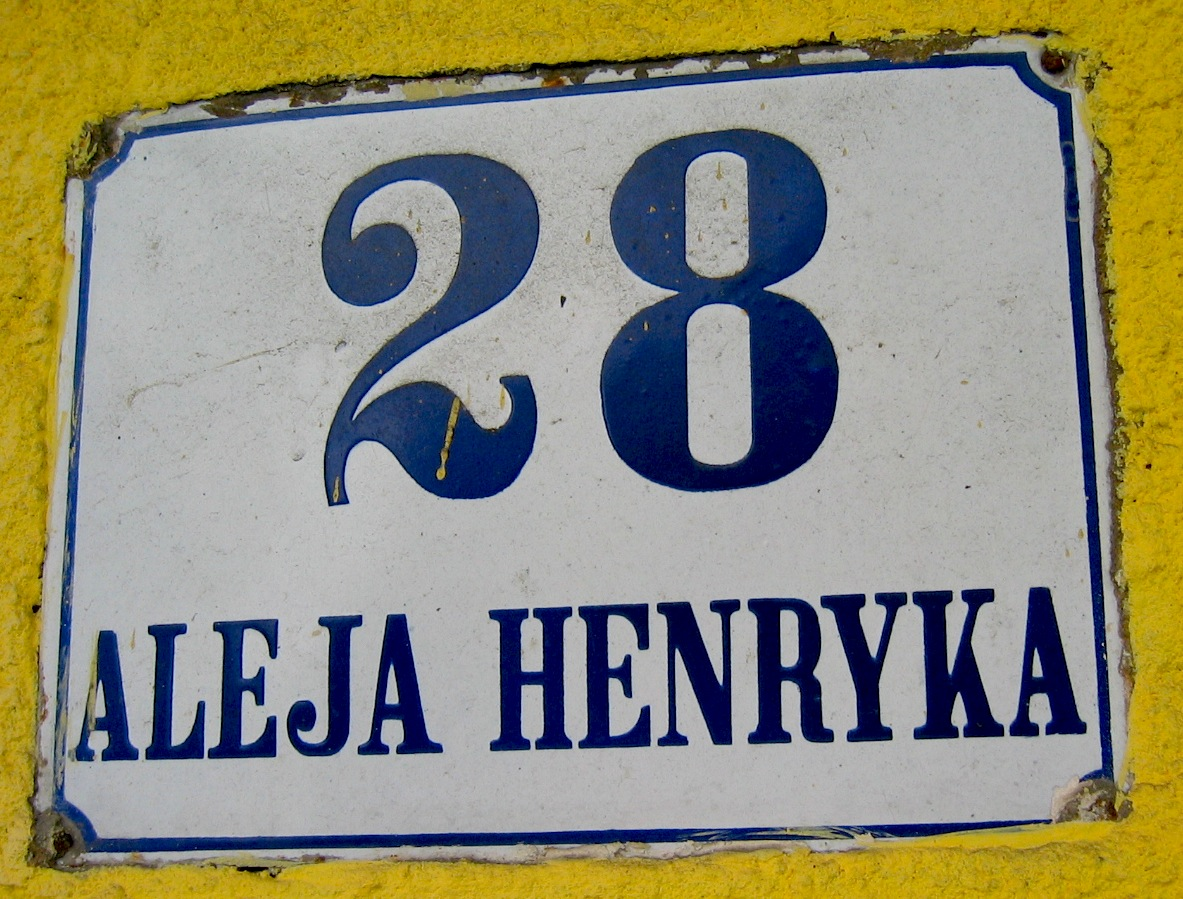
Street sign in Chrzanów, Poland

Aleja Henryka in Chrzanów, Poland, was named in his honour.
