= Irena and Mieczysław Mazaraki Museum =

Coordinates: 50°08′36″N 19°24′07″E

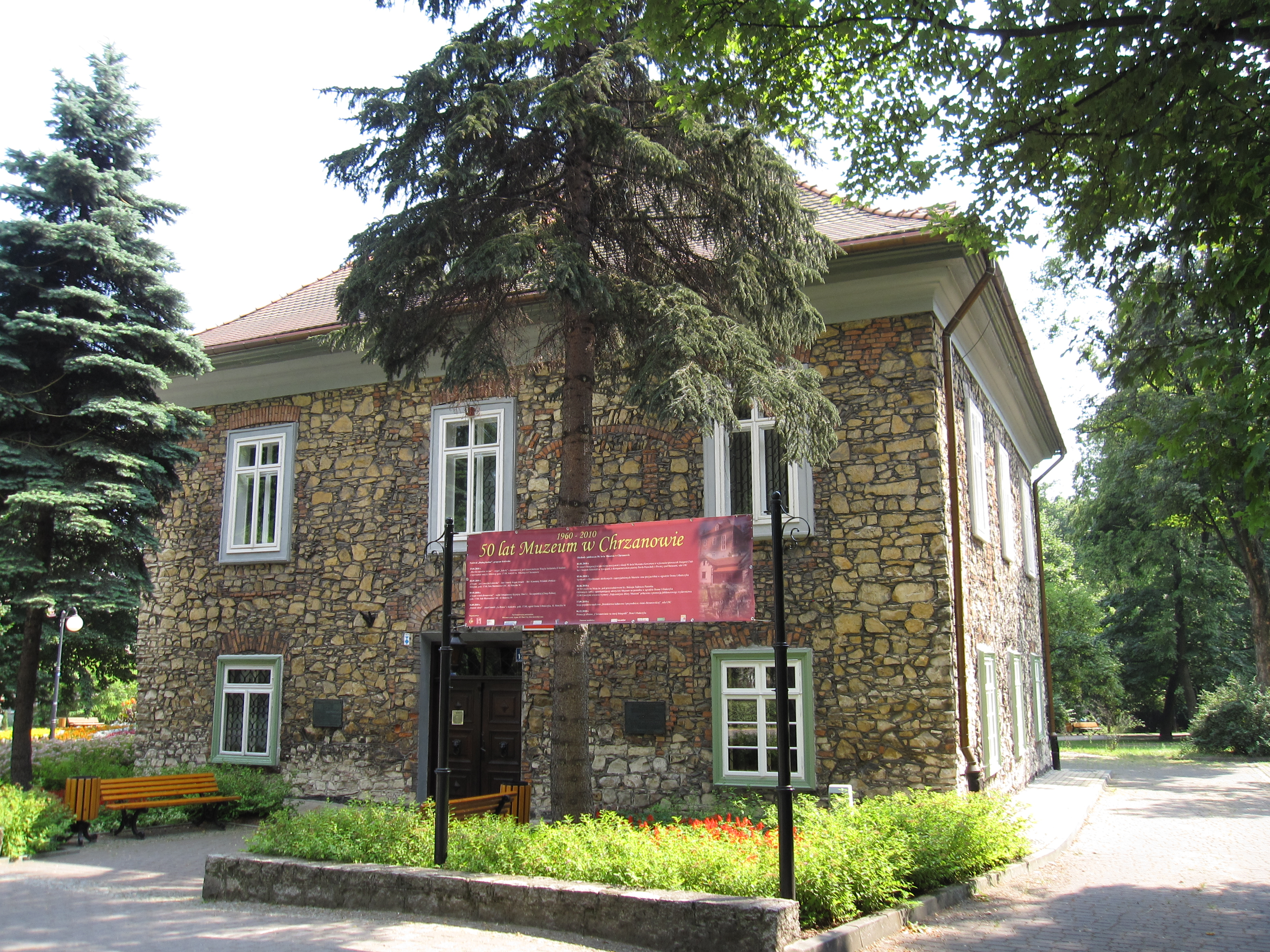
The Loewenfeld mansion houses the municipal museum of Chrzanów

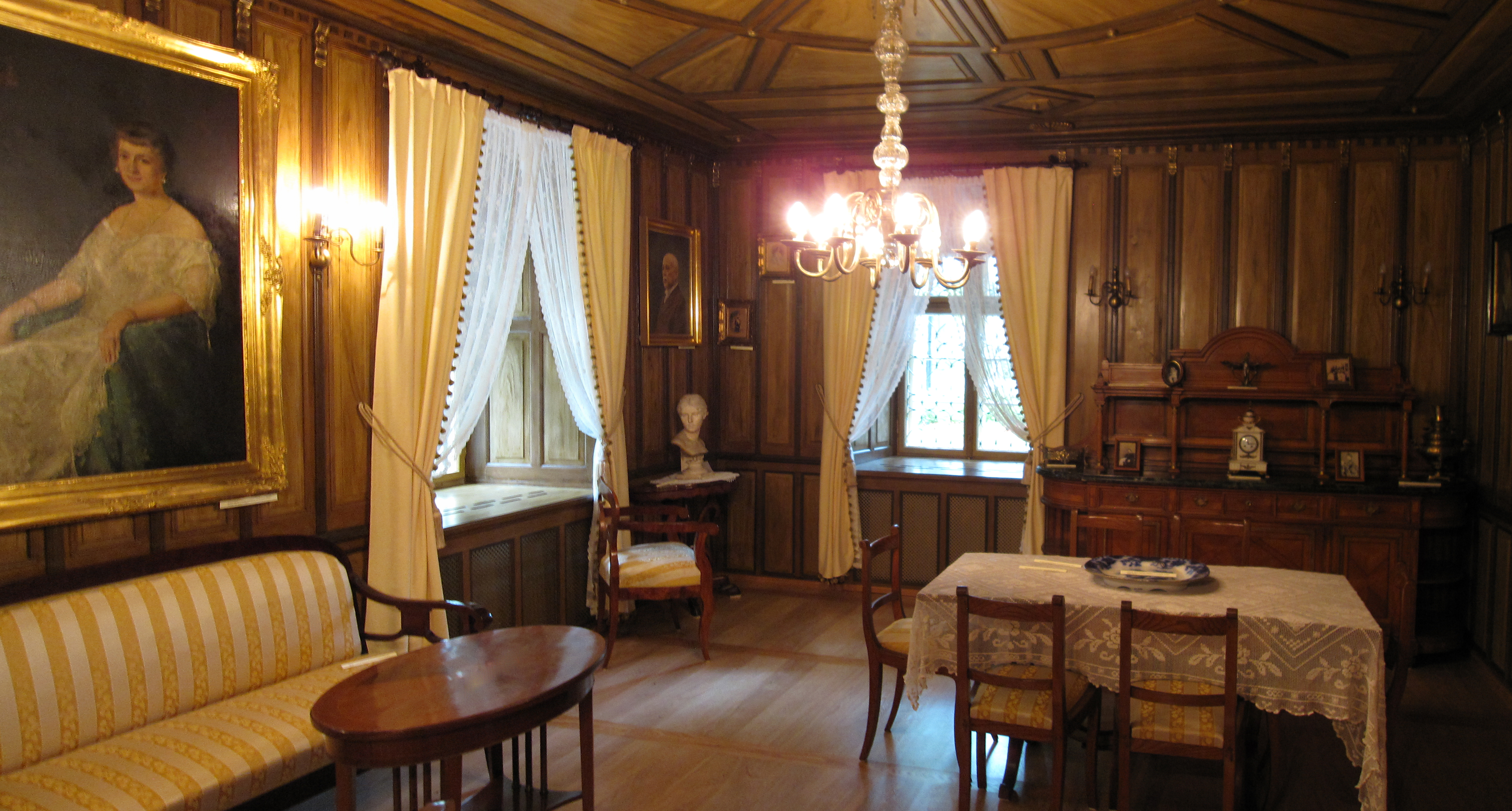
Biedermeier salon inside the Loewenfeld mansion

The Irena and Mieczysław Mazaraki Museum (Polish: Muzeum w Chrzanowie im. Ireny i Mieczysława Mazarakich) is a regional museum in Chrzanów in Lesser Poland Voivodeship. It was once the home of Henry Lowenfeld, a 19th-century entrepreneur and migrant into Great Britain.

== History ==
It was founded in 1960 as an independent cultural institution of the municipality of Chrzanów. It focuses on the culture and industry in the western part of Lesser Poland.

The permanent exhibition is housed at ulica Mickiewicza 13 in the former mansion of Henry Lowenfeld who settled in England. It presents the history, culture and nature studies of the Chrzanów's region, including flora and fauna and a geology collection. There is a section devoted to local Jewish history with a miniature model of the historical Chrzanów Synagogue. Industry is represented by a permanent exhibit about Fablok, the first locomotive factory in Poland. Some of the original interior of the Loewenfeld mansion is also preserved in the Biedermeier salon.

The sponsors of the museum were Irena and Mieczysław Mazaraki, in whose honour the museum was named. Through gifts and grants the collection has been expanded to include items such as art objects from Kraków, Judaica, national souvenirs, memorabilia of Pope John Paul II, and paintings from the 19th century.

Since 2007 the museum is also responsible for one of the chapels in town, as well as for the Jewish cemetery.

== Urbańczyk's House ==
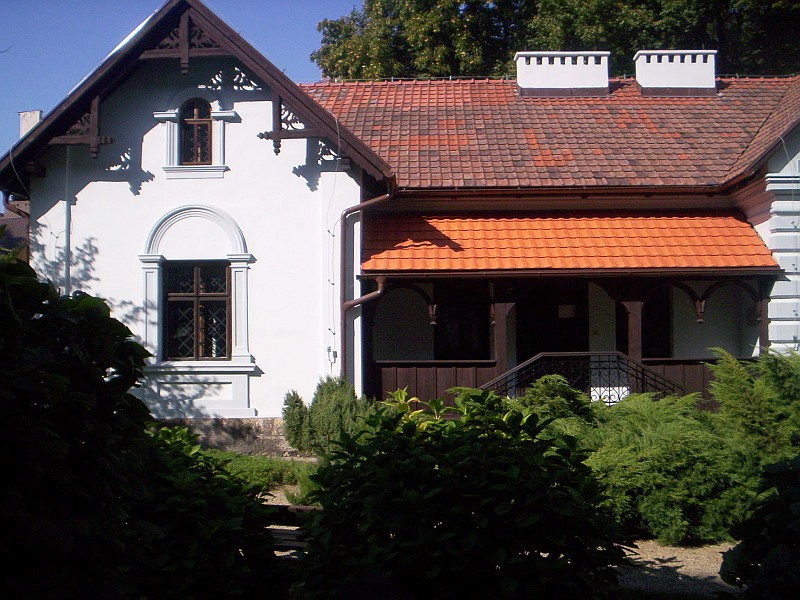
Urbańczyk House

The museum manages another site known as "Urbańczyk's House" (Dom Urbańczyka), at Aleja Henryka 16. The house was built in the 19th century by Franciszek Urbańczyk, the father of Tadeusz Urbańczyk, a local secondary-school master. In 1985 the house and garden were converted into a museum, with a library and archive. The architecture is in the provincial style of the region and is registered on the heritage list. The venue is used for exhibitions, lectures and concerts.

== Image gallery ==
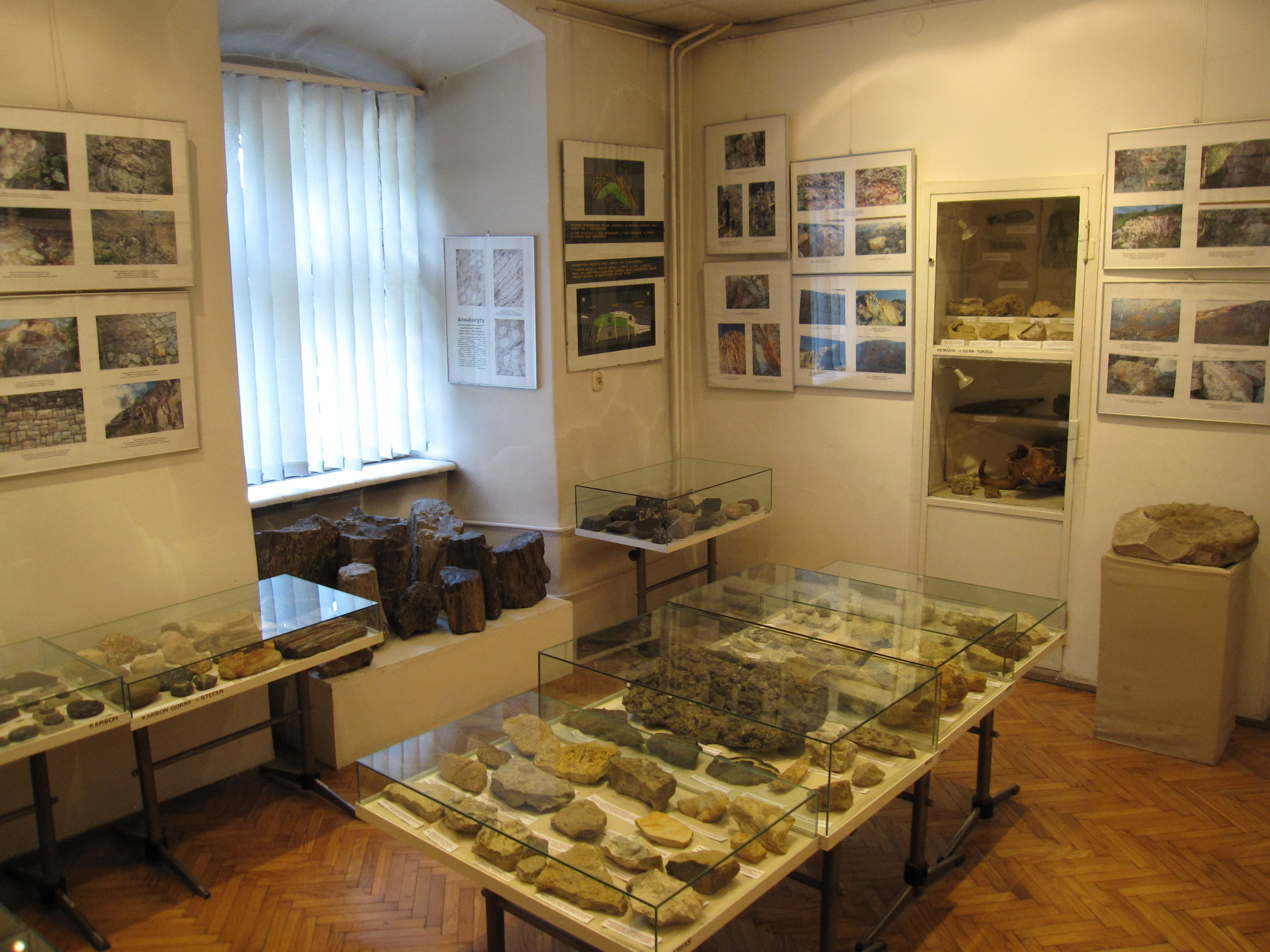
Minerals and rock collection

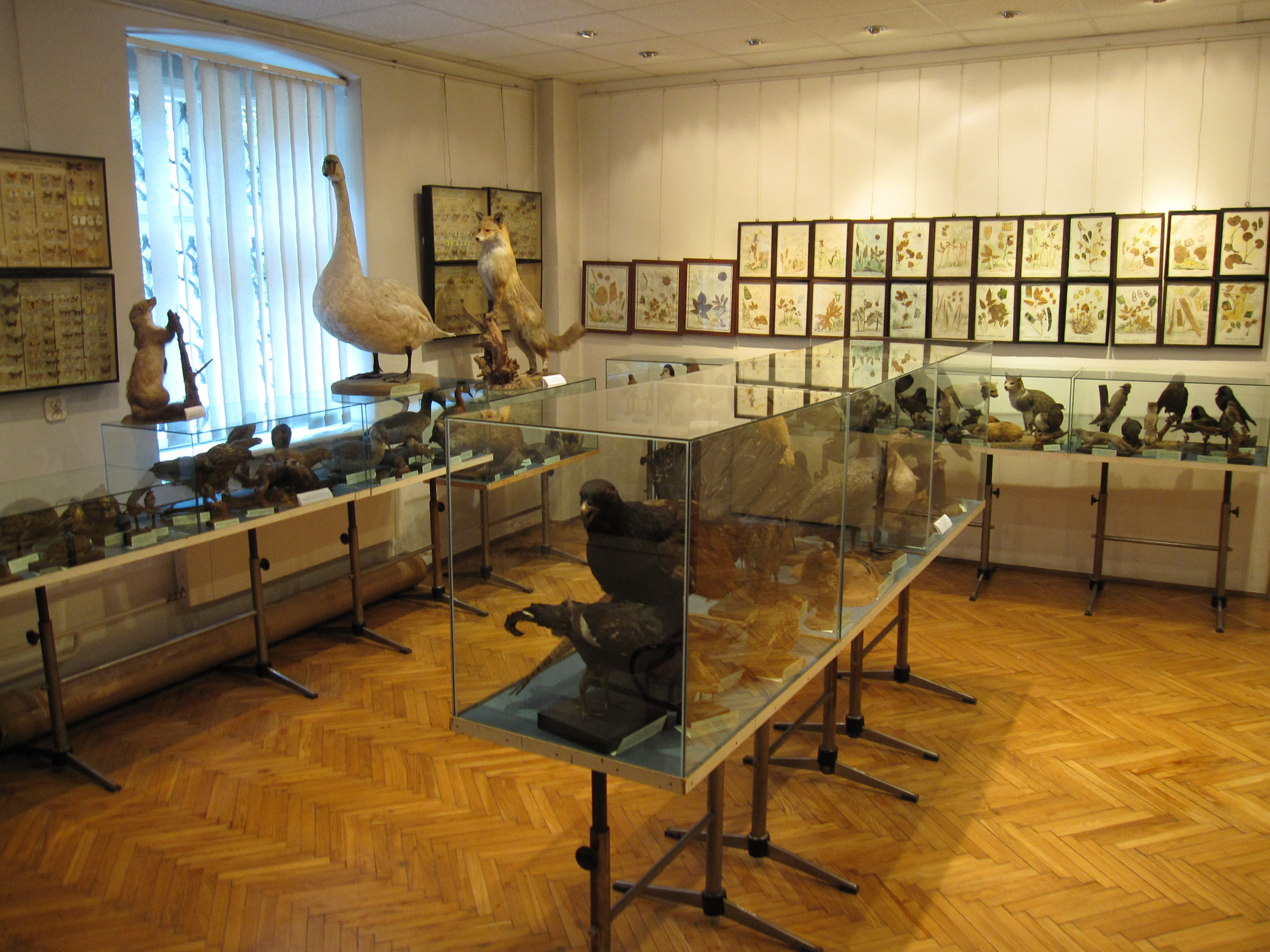
Flora and fauna collection

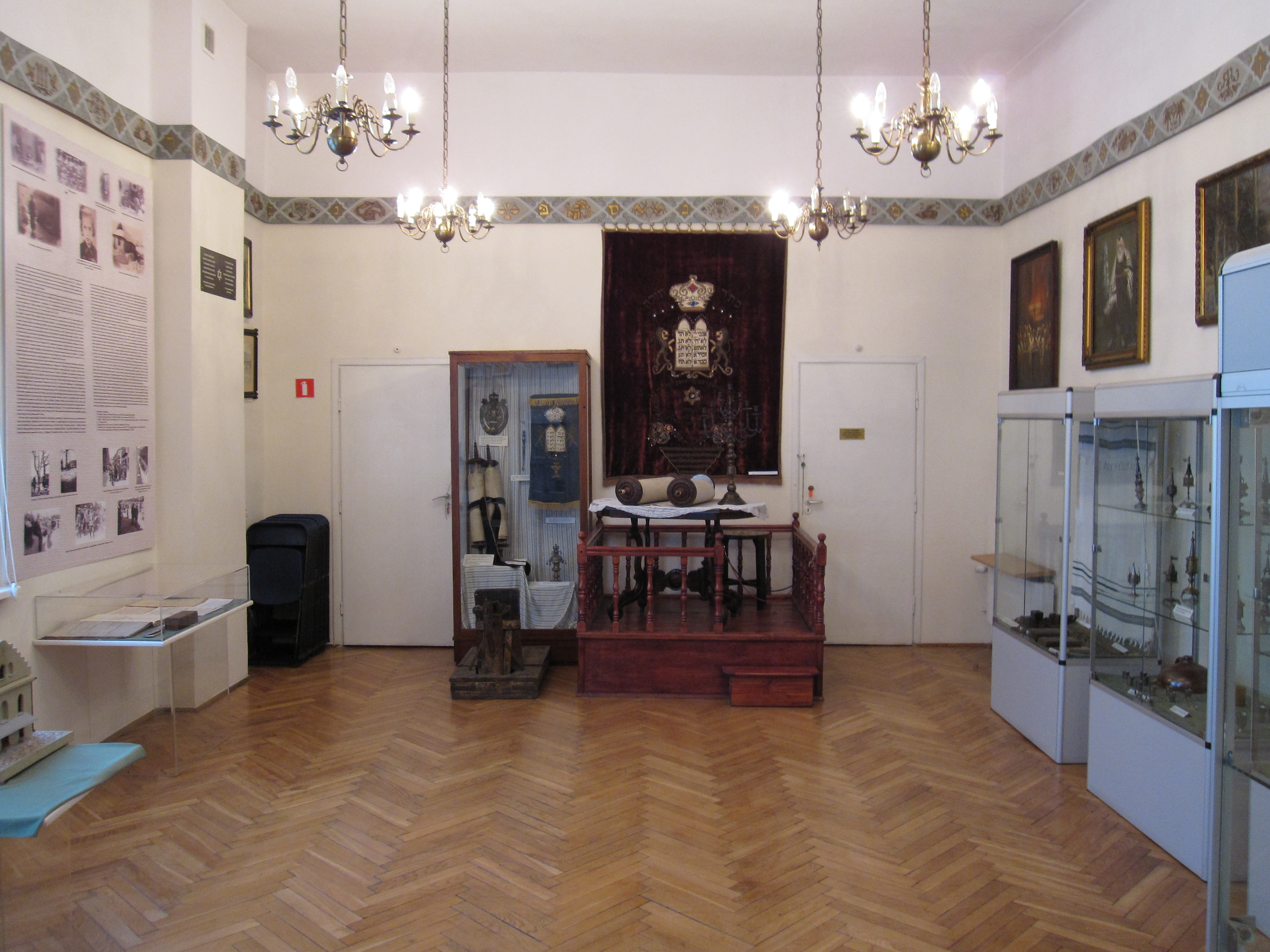
Room featuring the Jewish history of Chrzanów

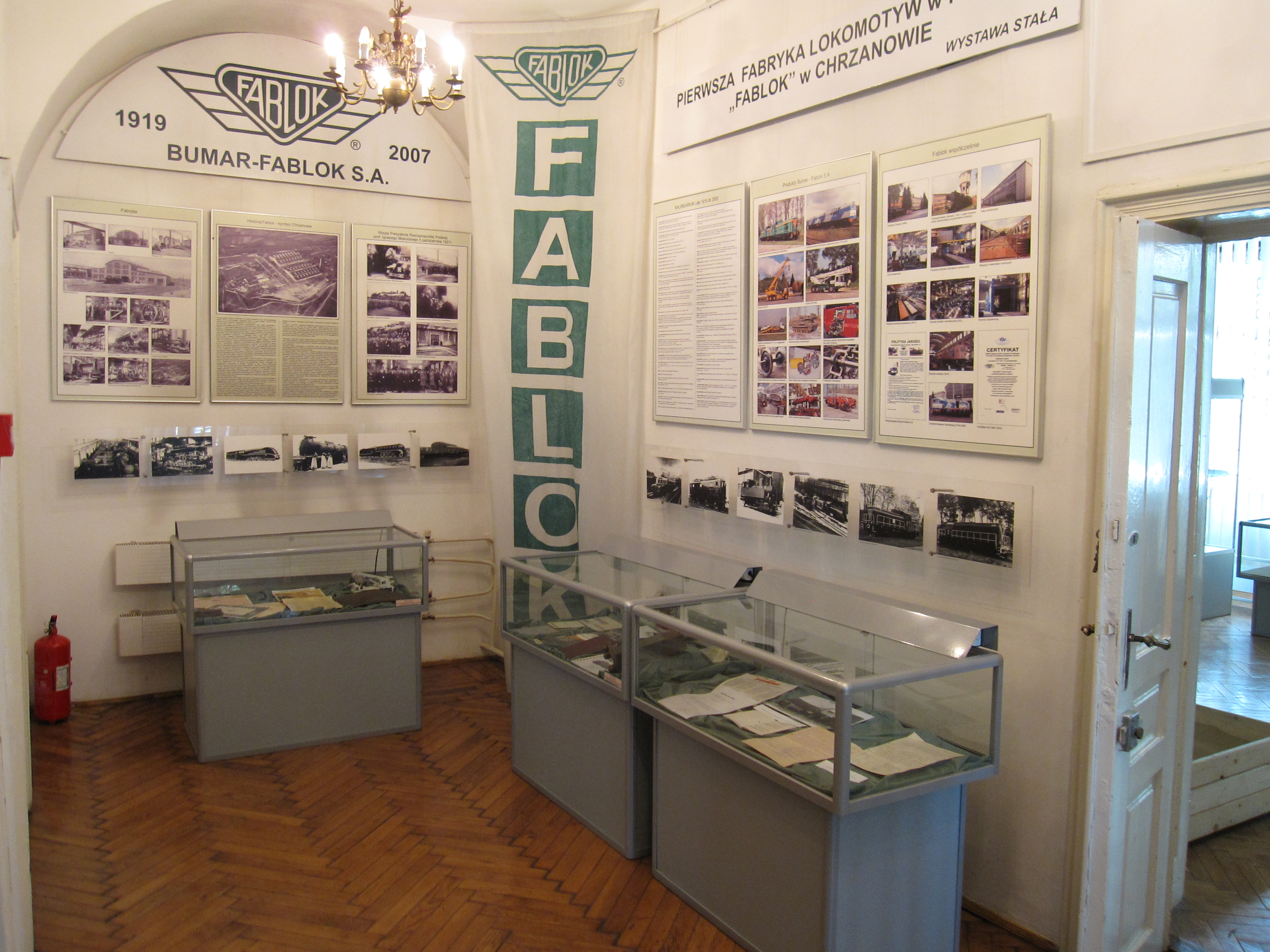
Exhibit on the locomotive factory Fablok
