= Jewish Cemetery, Chrzanów =

Jewish cemetery in Poland

Coordinates: 50°08′06″N 19°24′10″E

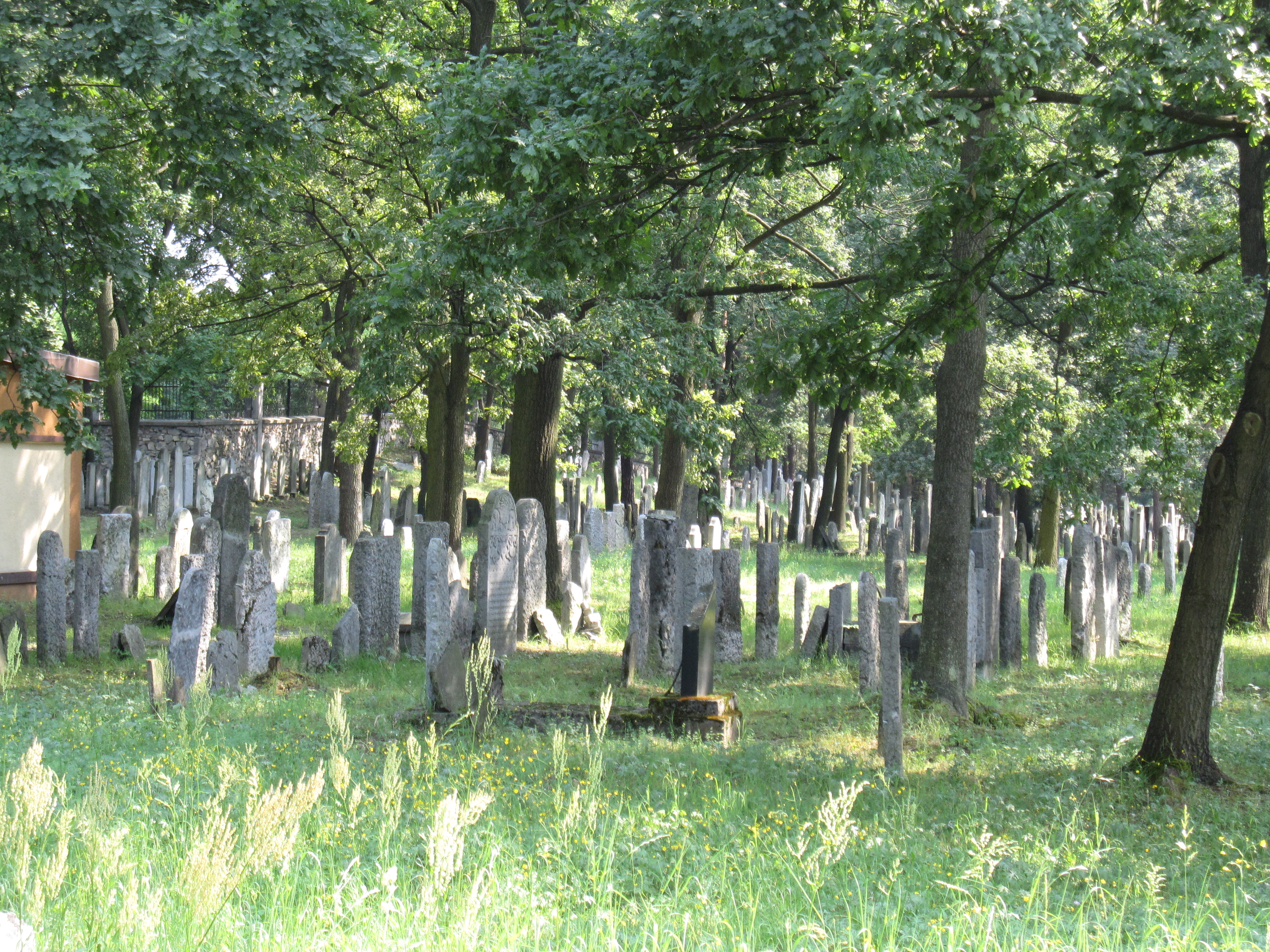
Jewish cemetery of Chrzanów

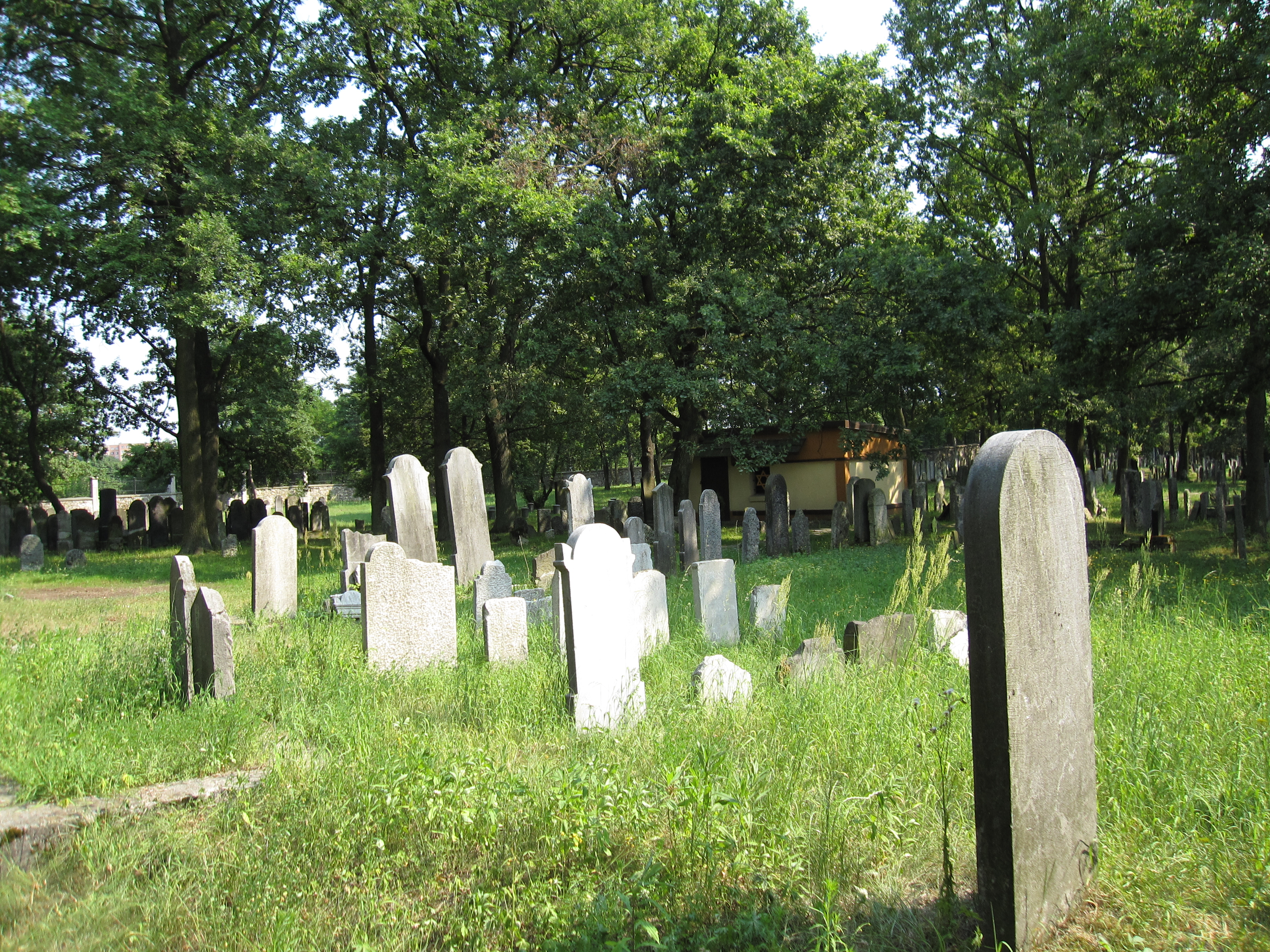
Tombstones in the cemetery

The Jewish cemetery of Chrzanów in the Lesser Poland Voivodeship is located outside the centre.

== History ==
It was founded in the middle of the 18th century. It covers an area of 1.71 ha and houses over 3,700 places of burial. The oldest gravestone preserved until now dates back to 1802 and the most recent one to 1949. There are two ohelim at the cemetery: one of Rabbi Salomon Bochner, who died in 1828, who was a student of Elimelech of Lezajsk, and the other one of six representatives of the rabbinic dynasty of the Helbersztams who lived at the turn of the 19th and 20th century. A collective tomb has been situated in the centre of the cemetery for 37 people who were murdered in 1939 in Trzebinia by the Nazis.

On August 7, 2007, a thorough renovation of the cemetery was concluded with an international ceremony, and in December 2007 the cemetery was entrusted to the care of the Chrzanów Museum.

Admission for prayer purposes is possible as well as guided tours through the Chrzanów Museum. The cemetery remains closed on Saturdays and Jewish holidays.
