= Kops Brewery =

British brewery

Coordinates: 51.4673°N 0.1878°W

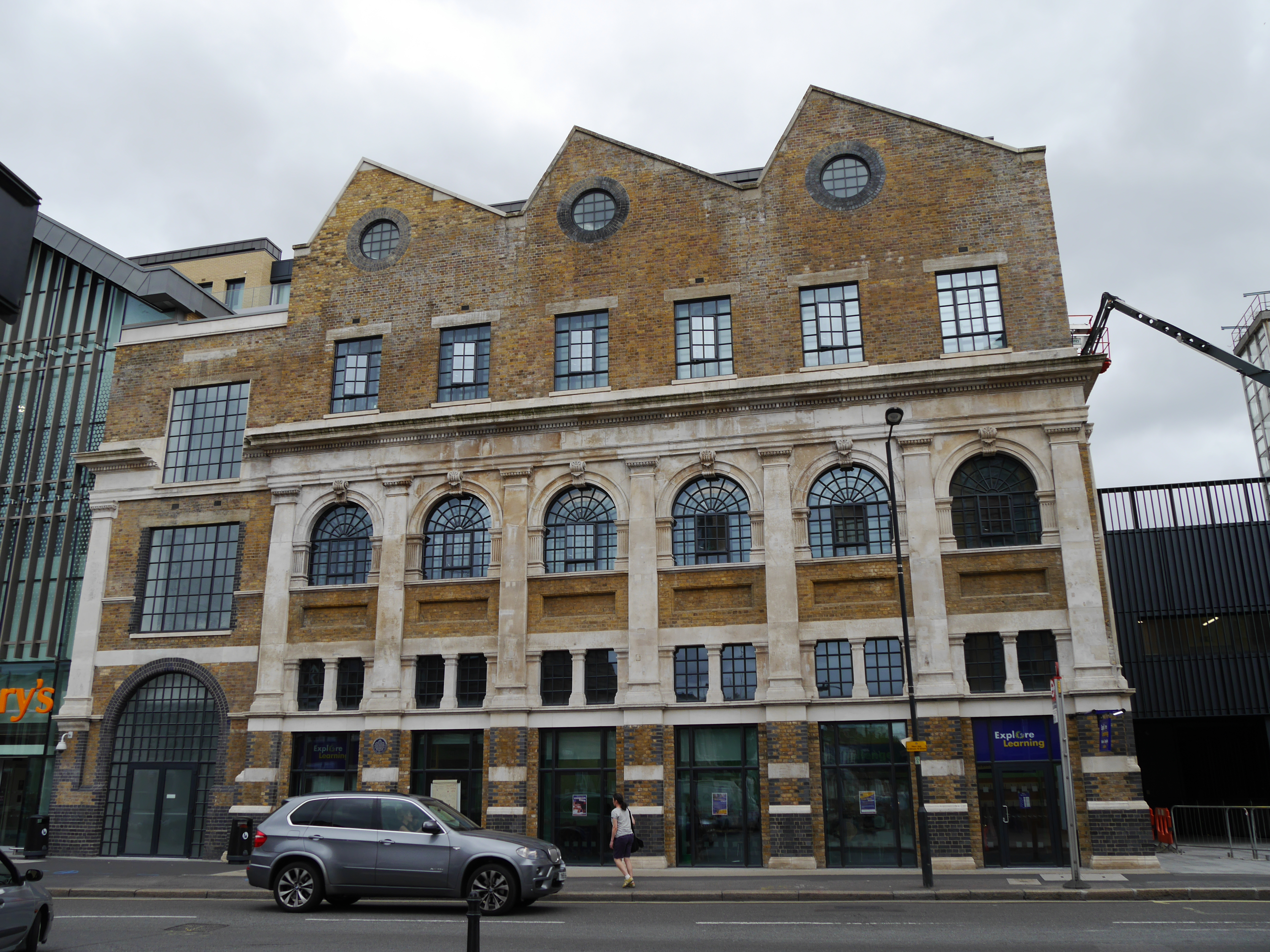
Kops Brewery, Fulham

The Kops Brewery, founded by Henry Lowenfeld in 1890 was the first brewer of non-alcoholic beer in the United Kingdom.

In December 2014, the renovated building received a blue plaque from the Hammersmith & Fulham Historic Buildings Group, "Kops brewed non-alcoholic ales and stouts on an eight-acre site and exported its products throughout the British Empire".

The building was used after World War II by Convoys food packaging company.
