= Chrzanów =

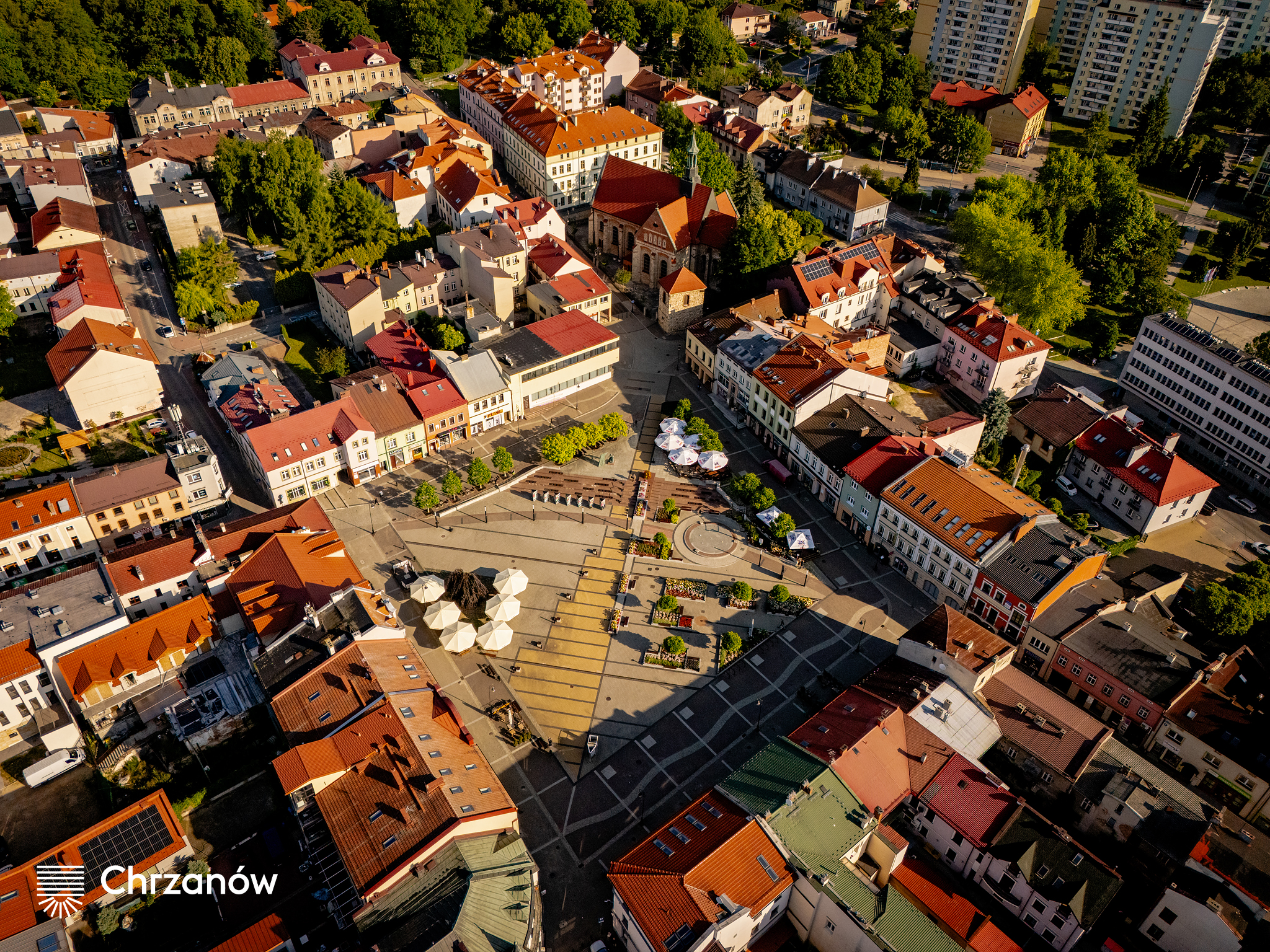
- Aerial view of the Market Square

- Flag Coat of arms

- Location within Poland
- Coordinates: 50°8′N 19°24′E
- Country: Poland
- Voivodeship: Lesser Poland
- County: Chrzanów
- Gmina: Gmina Chrzanów

Government
  - Mayor: Robert Maciaszek (PL2050)

Area
  - Total: 38.31 km^{2} (14.79 sq mi)
- Elevation: 280 m (920 ft)

Population (31 December 2021)
  - Total: 35,651
  - Density: 930.6/km^{2} (2,410/sq mi)
- Time zone: UTC+1 (CET)
  - Summer (DST): UTC+2 (CEST)
- Postal code: 32-500 to 32-503
- Area code: +48 32
- Car plates: KCH
- Website: http://www.chrzanow.pl

Chrzanów ([ˈxʂanuf]) is a town in southern Poland with 35,651 inhabitants as of December 2021. It is situated in the Lesser Poland Voivodeship and is the seat of Chrzanów County.

== History ==
=== History to 1809 ===
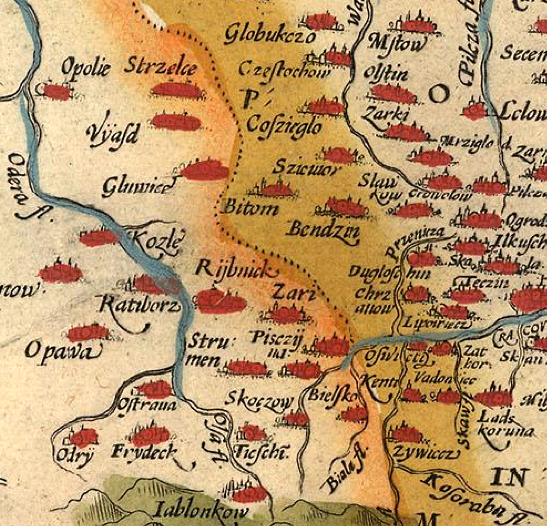
Fragment of a map from 1592 with Chrzanow marked

It is impossible to establish a reliable date for the foundation of the town. A stronghold existed on the site, which was later raised to the rank of a castellany. The earliest documents which corroborate the existence of Chrzanów castellany come from the late 12th century when, in around 1178, Chrzanów castellany was annexed to Silesia by order of Duke Casimir II the Just. In the second half of the 13th century it was reunited with the Duchy of Kraków. In 1241 the wooden stronghold of Chrzanów was put to the torch by Mongol hordes invading Poland from the east. The town of Chrzanów was rebuilt according to the Magdeburg Law in the mid-14th century under the reign of King Casimir III the Great. However it seems that it was not surrounded by defence walls. It is believed that Chrzanów was an open town. The local church was mentioned for the first time in documents in the tax-register of Peter's Pence, 1325–1328. From the time of its construction in the 14th century until 1640 the town was the property of the Ligęza family of the Półkozic coat of arms. In the mid-15th century Chrzanów had c. 430 residents and in the 17th century some 650. At least from the early 15th century a parish school existed next to Chrzanów's Church of St Nicholas.

In the 16th century King Sigismund II Augustus of Poland bestowed a new privilege on the town, allowing for four extra fairs. Various guilds were active in the town: weavers', tailors', shoemakers', smiths', butchers' and others. Ancient Chrzanów's speciality was trading cattle, as here was a customs house for exports of cattle to Silesia and ore trade which was mined and smelted by Chrzanów's burghers. In 1640 Chrzanów was taken over by Andrzej Samuel Dembiński. Then in 1649 it was inherited by his granddaughter Katarzyna Grudzińska, and in 1675 by the Stadnicki family. In 1731 it went to Józef Kanty Ossoliński. In 1654 King John II Casimir bestowed upon Chrzanów the privilege of holding extra fairs and in 1781 a similar privilege was bestowed on the town by King Stanislaus II Augustus. The second half of the 17th century was a particularly hard period for Chrzanów. As a result of wars waged at the time the town was looted on several occasions by the Swedes (1655–1657), the Austrians who fought against them (1657), by Transylvanian troops of Prince George Rákóczi and by Polish troops as well. During the Great Northern War Chrzanów was plundered and put to the torch by Swedish troops of King Charles XII. During the Polish-Russian war which broke out in 1792, Chrzanów was occupied by Russian (1792–1793) and Prussian troops (1793–1795). In 1795, following the Third Partition of Poland, Chrzanów was annexed to Galicia in the Habsburg Empire.

=== 1809-1918 ===
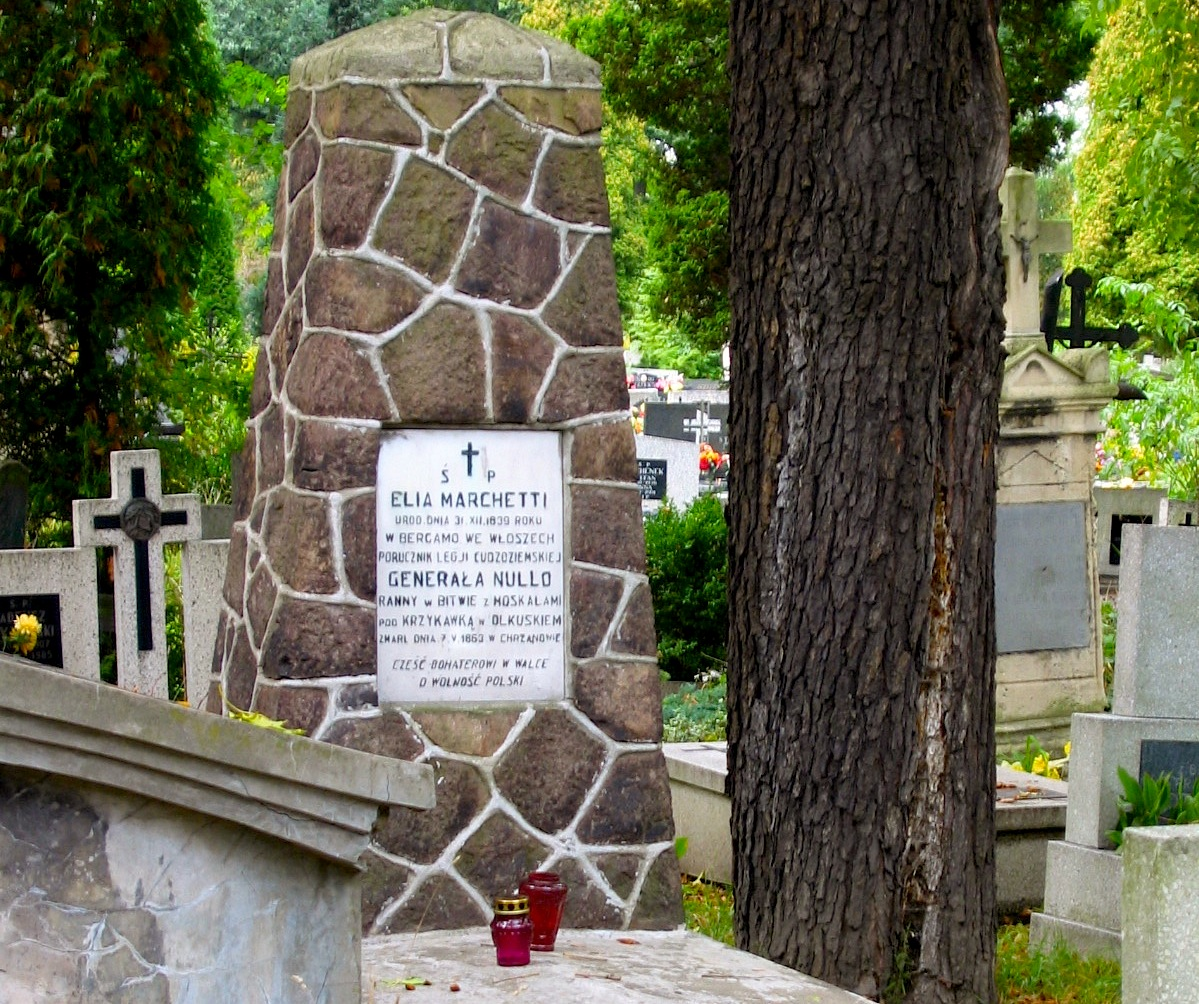
Grave of Elia Marchetti, soldier of the Garibaldi Legion, who died from wounds suffered in the 1863 battle of Krzykawka

In the period 1795-1809 Chrzanów was a part of Austrian Galicia. In 1809, as a result of the war between Austria and the Duchy of Warsaw, West Galicia with Chrzanów was annexed to the Duchy of Warsaw. During this period ownership of the town also changed. From 1804 to 1822 Chrzanów was owned by Duke Albert Casimir of Saxe-Cieszyn, son of the late King of Poland, Augustus III of Saxony. Following the fall of Napoleon, a treaty among Austria, Prussia and Russia was concluded during the Congress of Vienna resulting in creation of the Free City of Kraków on 3 May 1815. Chrzanów and the surrounding areas are annexed to the newly created state. In 1838 Chrzanów had 4078 residents: 2009 of the Roman-Catholic and 2069 of the Jewish faith. The period of the Free City of Cracow was a time of prosperity and rapid development for Chrzanów and its residents. In this period ownership of the town changed again. The former owner, Duke Albert Casimir of Saxe-Cieszyn, bequeathed the town to Archduke Karl Ludwig of Austria (1822), who in turn sold it to the Cracovian Senator and MP from Chrzanów Jan Mieroszewski. In 1856 Mieroszewski decided to sell his Chrzanów estate to a group of Wrocław entrepreneurs, one of whom, Emanuel Loewenfeld, soon became the sole owner.

In 1846, a revolt broke out in Kraków. Outside Kraków, Austrian troops were also engaged in battle at Chrzanów where in February 1846 a 15-troop squad commanded by the owner of Kwaczała estate, Józef Patelski, victoriously attacked Austrian troops forcing them to withdraw. The revolt was doomed, however, and in September 1846 Chrzanów with the entire Free City of Cracow was annexed to the Austrian Kingdom of Galicia. In 1853/54 Galicia was divided into counties (powiaty) and Chrzanów became a seat of a county. In 1847 the first part of the railway running through Chrzanów County was built: from Cracow to Silesia with railway stations in Krzeszowice, Trzebinia and Szczakowa. In 1856 another section was built joining Cracow with Vienna and this one ran through Chrzanów. In 1852 a zinc and lead ore mine "Matilda" was opened in the direct vicinity. Chrzanów entered the age of rapid industrialization. With it the number of residents grew. In 1870 the town had 6,323 inhabitants, 7,712 in 1890, 10,000 in 1900 and 11,572 in 1910. Henry Avenue (Aleja Henryka) was built in 1893 following a purchase of land situated between modern Henry Avenue and Oświęcimska St. from the Lowenfeld family. This initiated dynamic development of the town in S-W direction and intensive urbanization of the neighbourhood continued in the interwar period. In 1911 Chrzanów Secondary School was founded. Following Austria-Hungary's collapse in 1918 Chrzanów with the rest of Galicia was reunited with the Republic of Poland.

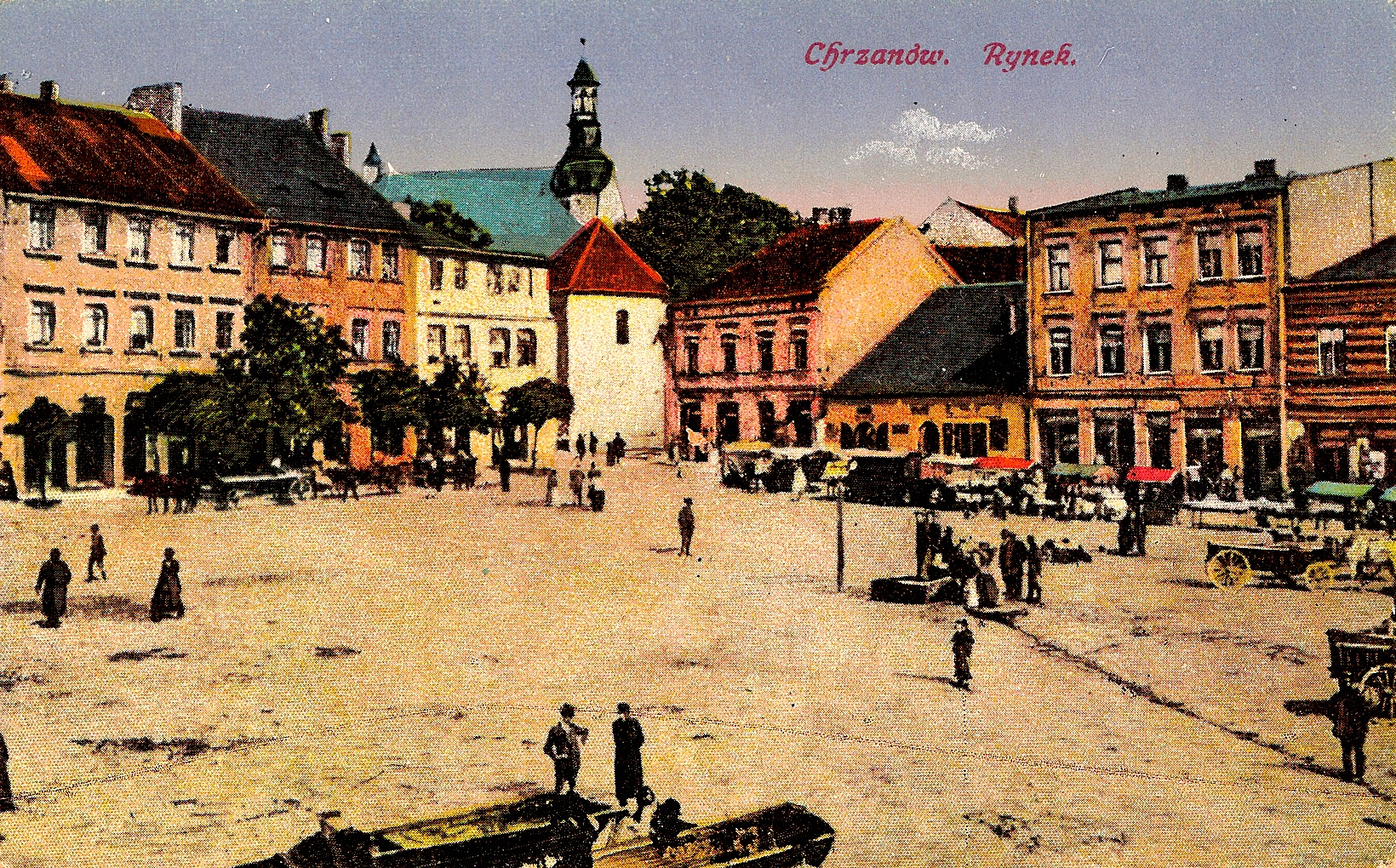
Chrzanów's Market Square, c. 1910

=== Interwar period ===
In the years 1919-1939 Chrzanów and Chrzanów County belonged to the Province of Cracow (Voivodeship) in the Second Polish Republic. In the interwar years further industrialization of the town followed. In the 1920s Stella ceramic works and Fablok, the First Locomotive Factory in Poland, were founded. Many residents found employment there. The interwar years was the period of dynamic urbanization. A number of public buildings were constructed then (the Józef Piłsudski County Hospital, the Józef Piłsudski Children's House, a new building of Chrzanów Secondary School etc.), a residential area between Henry Avenue and Oświęcimska St. and housing estates at Kolonia Fabryczna and Rospontowa constructed for the employees of Fablok works. The population of the town in 1921 was 12,244 and 18,106 according to the 1931 census. In 1939 the number of residents was 22,000.

=== World War II ===
With the outbreak of World War II (1 September 1939) the town was flooded with refugees from Upper Silesia. In the morning of 3 September Polish local government was evacuated from the town, as well as many residents. The following day, after a number of short skirmishes with the Polish troops, the town was occupied by German troops. In November 1939 when the town with the western half of the county was annexed directly to Nazi Germany, Chrzanów was made a county town in the Katowice region of the Province of Upper Silesia.

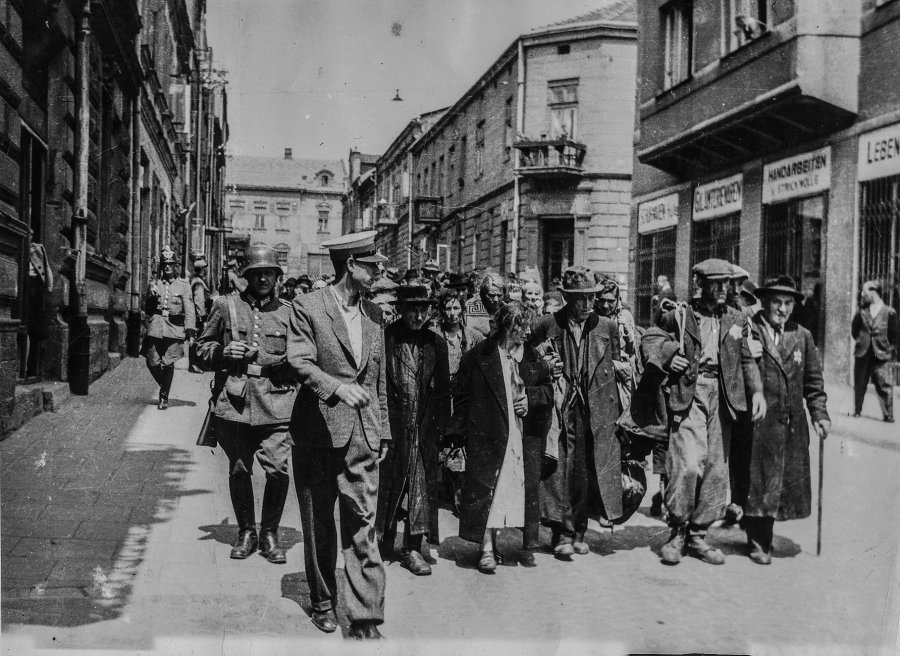
A group of Jews being led toward a railway station under German occupation

In 1940 the German authorities began expropriating Polish families from better houses in the town. These were given to German officials, military, policemen and German settlers from Romania. The Nazis started removing any Polish traces in the town with particular pettiness. Public buildings and shops had all signs written in Polish removed and all streets received German names. In 1941 the town itself was renamed Krenau. Jewish residents were resettled to a ghetto, created in 1941. It was not surrounded by walls, like in other Polish towns, nevertheless the Jews were not allowed to venture outside the ghetto. From 1942 the Germans started sending Chrzanów's Jews to the death camp in Auschwitz-Birkenau. The last transport of Jews from Chrzanów to Birkenau was organized by the Germans in February 1943.

On 29 April 1942 the Germans hanged seven Jews in Krzyska Street in Chrzanow. The seven Jews were accused of illegally baking bread. The victims were Israel Gerstner (bakery owner), Chaim Gerstner, Szymszen Gerstner, Szaja Szpangelet, Fajwel Waloman, Israel Frisz and an unknown man from Olkusz.

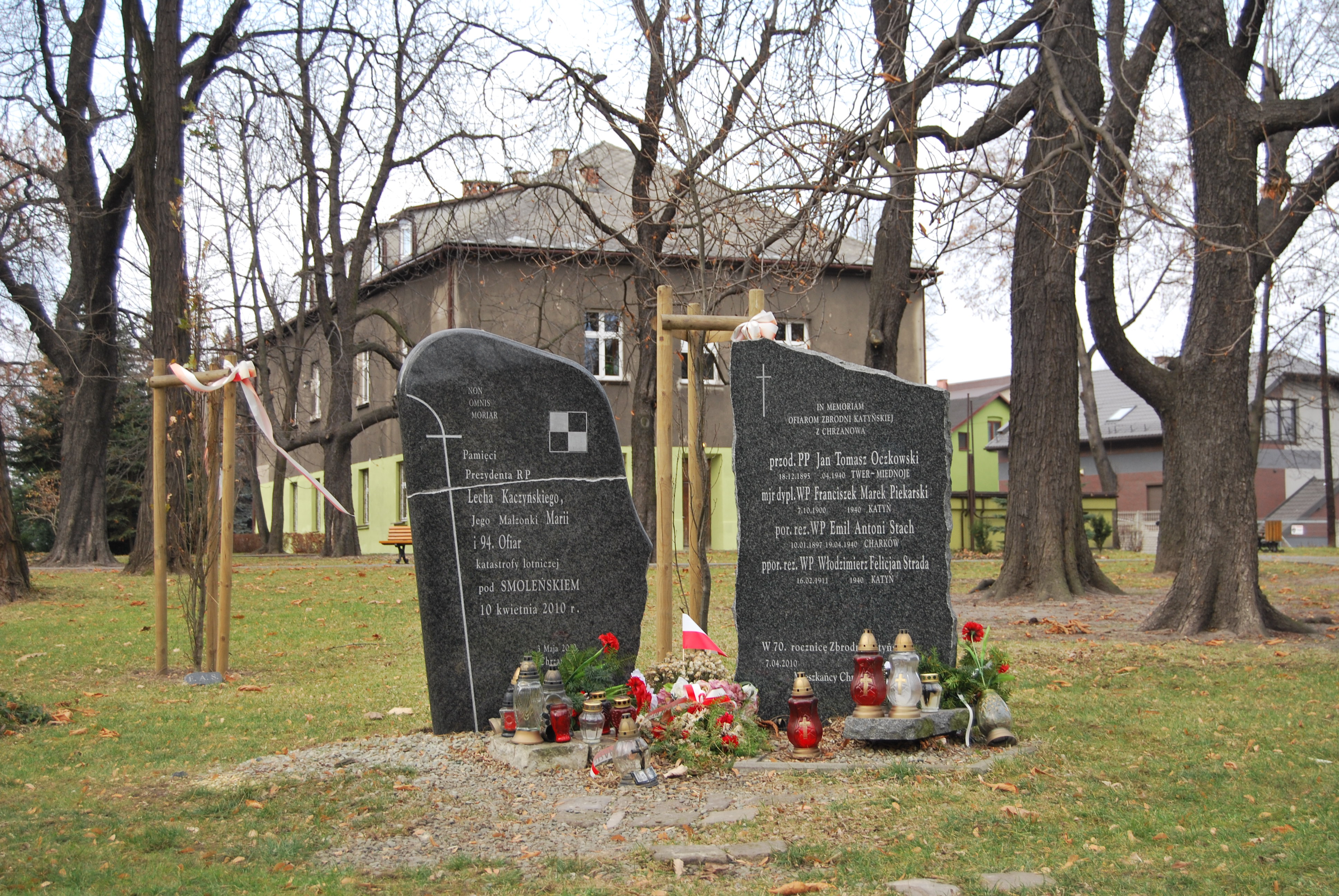
Memorial to local victims of the Katyn massacre and victims of the Smolensk air disaster

German occupation ended on 24 January 1945 when Chrzanów was taken over by Soviet troops of the 1st Ukrainian Front. The town escaped serious damage in this last chapter of its war history (about one-fourth of the town was damaged). The population decreased by almost half. From 30 January 1945 the town was administered first by the Town Council and then by the National Town Council. Due to ruthless political methods, local administration was soon seized by the local and incoming communists, although the communists themselves constituted a tiny fraction of the politically active residents.

=== Since 1945 ===
In 1949, Chrzanów had almost 15,000 residents, increasing to 20,000 in 1960, to over 30,000 in 1975 and to 53,000 in 1993. After 1945, new enterprises were created in the town (e.g. a dairy, a cold storage plant, a slaughterhouse) and new residential areas (housing estates Północ - from 1961, Południe - from 1979, Trzebińska and so on) and cultural centres (e.g. County Cultural Centre, the construction of which was initiated in 1959, and Chrzanów Museum founded in 1960). In 1970-71 a new town centre was constructed focusing around the Millennium Square (Plac Tysiąclecia) and the Victory and Liberty Monument. In 1975, following an administrative reform abolishing counties (powiaty), Chrzanów ceased to be a county seat. Further, the town was detached from its original Province of Cracow, to which it belonged since restoration of Poland's independence after World War I, and annexed to the Province of Katowice until 1999. Since 1999 Chrzanów has been a county seat in Małopolskie, or Lesser Poland Voivodeship.

== Demographics ==
Detailed data as of 31 December 2021:

Description	All		Women		Men	
Unit	person	percentage	person	percentage	person	percentage
Population	35651	100	18634	52.3%	17017	47.7%
Population density	930.6		486.4		444.2	

=== Number of inhabitants by year ===
Year	Population	Source
1995	42079 ▼	
2000	41130 ▼	
2005	39944 ▼	
2010	38956 ▼	
2015	37268 ▼	
2020	36118 ▼	
2021	35651 ▼	

== Main sights ==
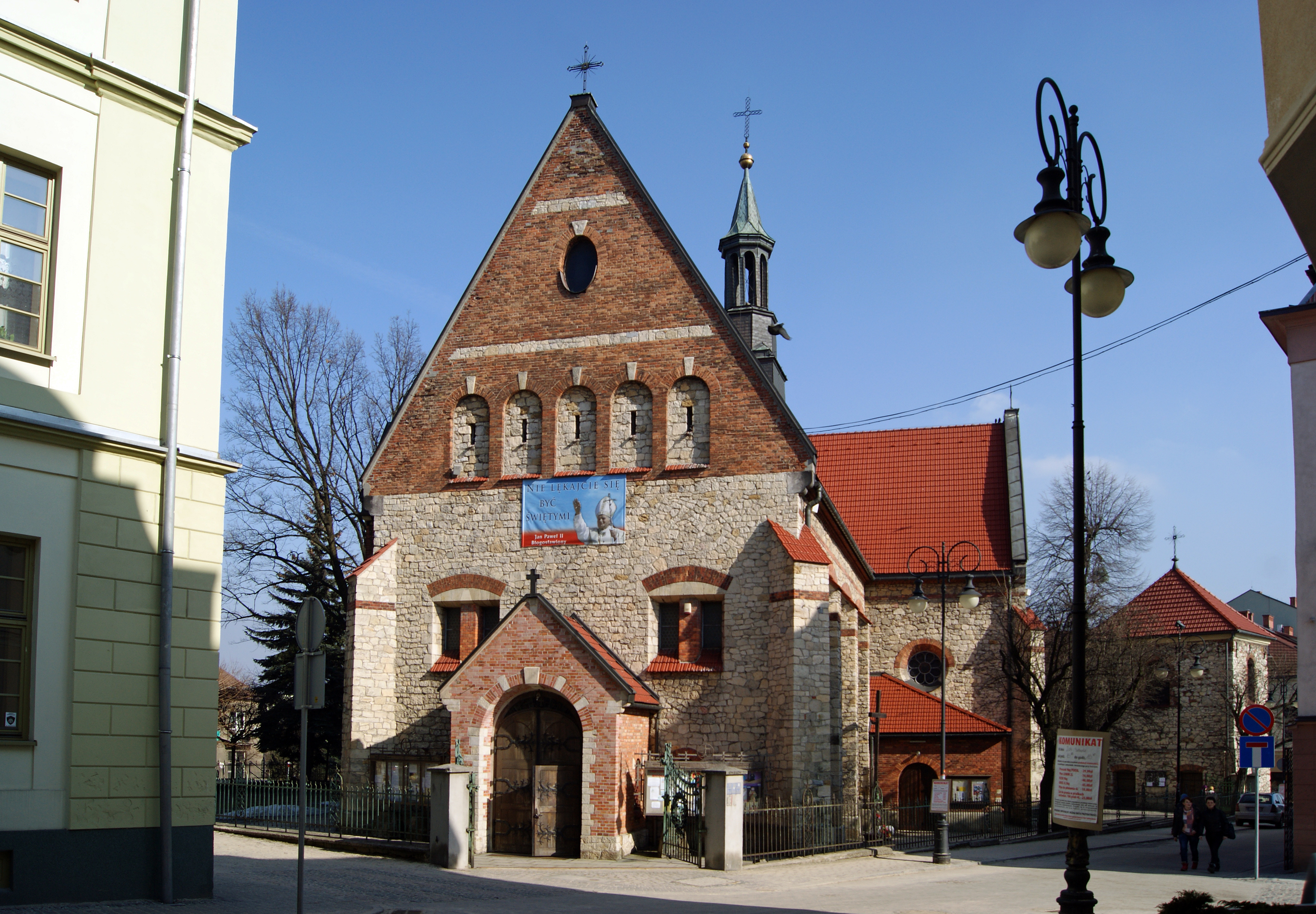
Saint Nicholas church

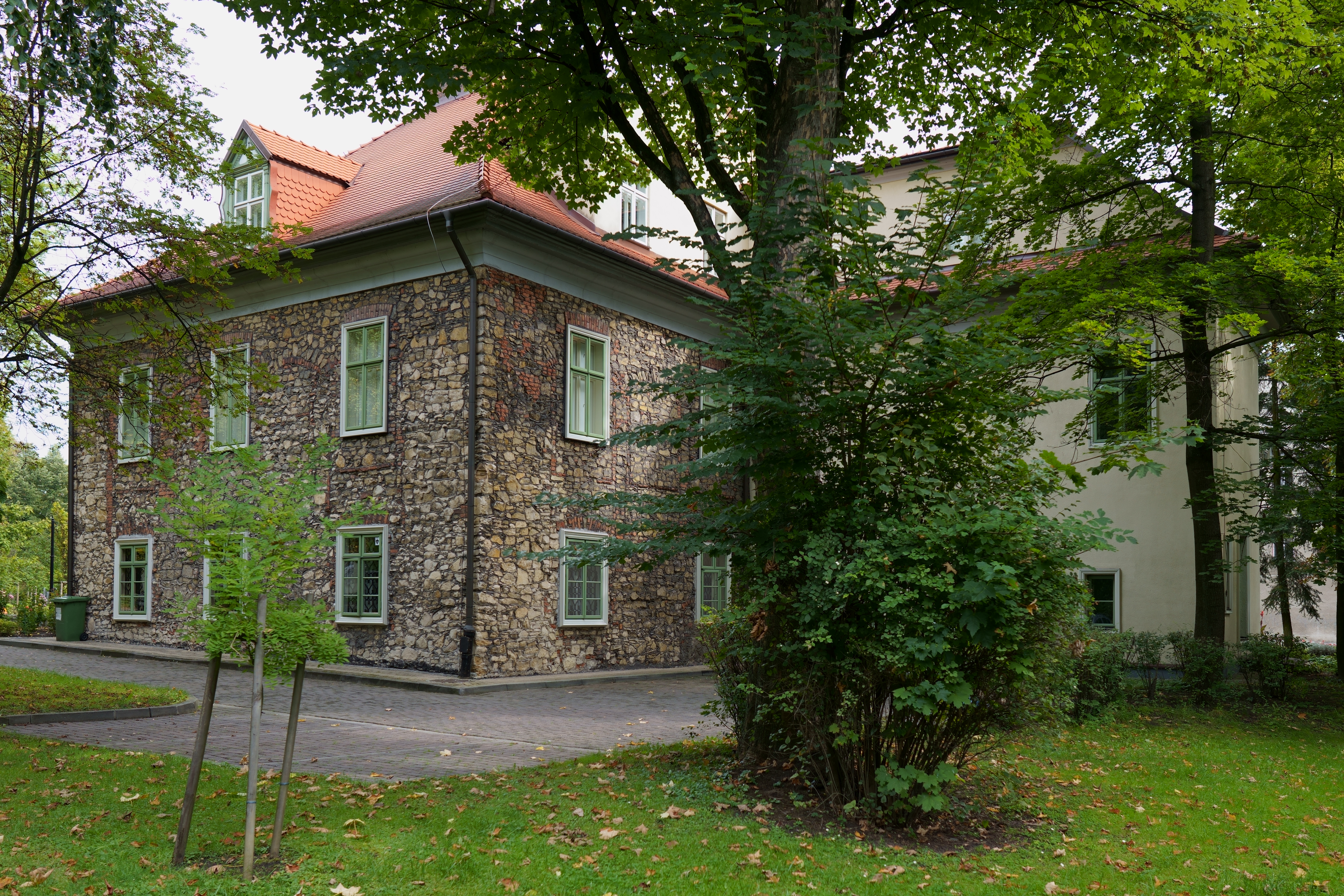
Chrzanów Museum

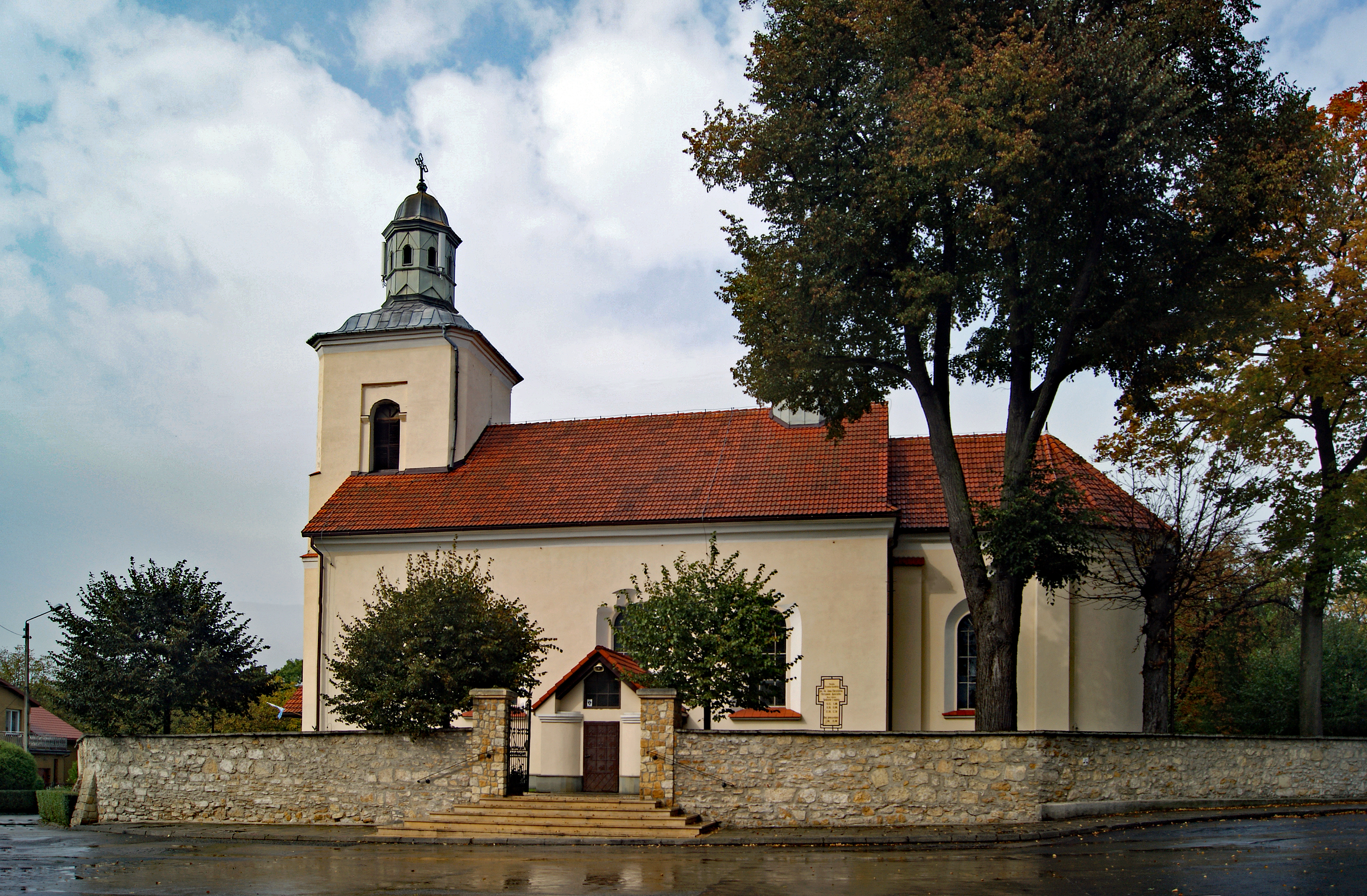
Saint John the Baptist church

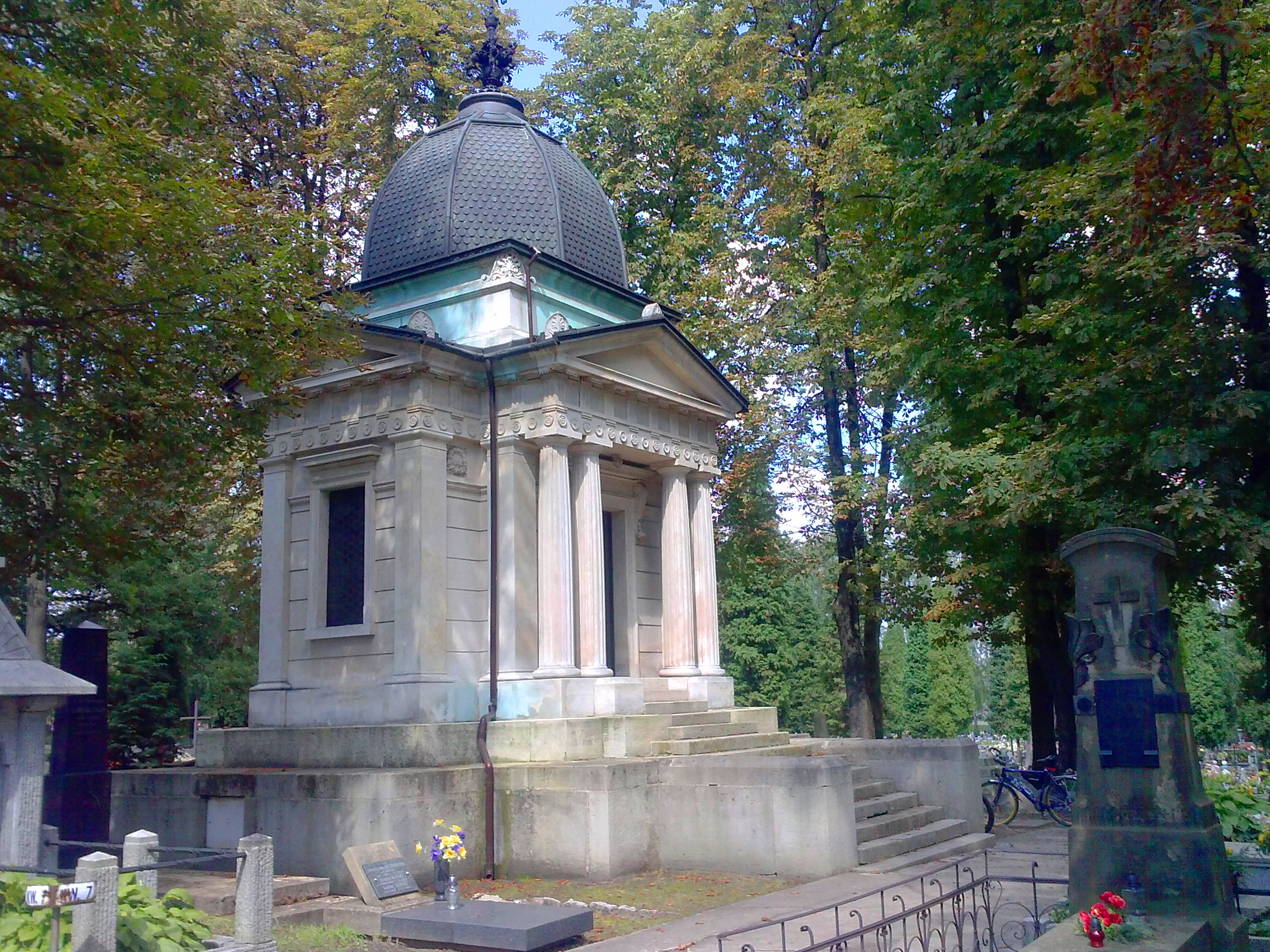
Loewenfeld Mausoleum

- Church of St Nicholas, most probably constructed at the turn of the 13th and 14th centuries Its final architectural shape - as it then seemed, as it survived only until 1912 - had been created in the 15th century and shortly afterwards by adding annexes. A detached belfry was erected next to the church most probably around the same time. The present church was created by extensive reconstruction in 1912-1914. The interior decoration consist of several interesting altars with old paintings, arrestingly beautiful stained glass windows from 1914, grand chandelier from the 1930s and many other interesting historic objects.
- The Loewenfeld Mausoleum, built in 1898-1900 in Neo-Classical style on the Greek cross plan, according to a design of Teodor Talowski from Kraków. The chapel was raised as the mausoleum of the last owners of Chrzanów, the Loewenfelds.
- Market Square with residences from the late 18th and 19th centuries. Probably the most interesting of those is a 1905-1907 two-storey, Art-Nouveau house at nr 13 (previously nr 22). It has a façade of glazed bricks opulently decorated with miscellaneous ornaments (mostly chestnut foliage).
- The Victory and Liberty Monument at the Tysiąclecia Sq. (locally known as "The Eagle") by the Chrzanovian sculptor Marian Konarski. It was raised in 1971 in memory of the residents of Chrzanów who fell during World War II.
- The castle granary from the 16th century, now the seat of the Chrzanów Museum. The building was originally a part of the manor assembly (called the Castle), which in turn was the residence of the owners of Chrzanów. Since 1960 the building has housed collections of the Chrzanów Museum, including mementos of the last owners, the Loewenfelds. The Museum has an interesting collections on local history divided into several sections.
- The Church of St John the Baptist in Kościelec had been built probably in the 14th century in Gothic style and it was preserved as such until 1843/45 when a decision was made for a general reconstruction of the church due to its rather poor shape. Among other interesting furnishings of the church is the 19th-century high altar and black Dębniki marble epitaphs of the former owners of Kościelec, which until the recent renovation used to be on the walls of the presbytery. The church has a richly adorned bell of 1484.
- The Building of the Credit Society (1895) in Henry Avenue, with rich eclectic details including two porches with column porticos which make the whole structure look quite handsome.
- Jewish cemetery (c. 1763) with 19th- and 20th-century tombstones. Initially it had consisted of two cemeteries, the small one (which was destroyed by the Germans in 1941) and the big one which has been preserved down to our own days (small part of which, however, was destroyed by the Germans during World War II).
- World War I cemetery behind / adjacent to the Jewish cemetery of 1914/15 with approx. 170 interred, mainly Austro-Hungarian soldiers who died in the Chrzanów military hospitals. The site has been cleaned, a simple cross with the names of the interred erected in 2014, and restoration is envisaged to be completed by 2018.

== Flag and coat of arms ==
The ancient coat of arms of Chrzanów, the St Nicholas, was created perhaps in the 14th century simultaneously with granting the Magdeburg Rights to Chrzanów. The oldest preserved seals of the town of Chrzanów are charged with an effigy of St Nicholas, the patron-saint of the local church, who holds a crosier in his right hand and a book in his left and wears bishop's vestments and a bishop's mitre on his head. Next to St Nicholas the Półkozic crest is seen which was the arms of the Ligęza Family, the former owners of Chrzanów. This coat of arms had been used by the town until c. 1809, when the authorities of the Duchy of Warsaw to which Chrzanów belonged to then, annulled all municipal coats-of-arms. Following the fall of the Duchy of Warsaw (1815) the arms of the Duchy was adopted as the arms of Chrzanów. It is unclear why the ancient and traditional arms were not restored. The arms of the Duchy of Warsaw, adopted after 1815 as the arms of Chrzanów, were a shield divided in half and placed under a royal crown. In the right field of the shield were the arms of Saxony (black and golden stripes divided by a green crown-shaped half-wreath). In the left field were the coat of arms of Poland.

In 1964 the flag of Chrzanów was adopted. During the session of the City Council on 21 May 1964 it was decided that the city colours would be blue and red put in two horizontal stripes, exactly like the colours of the Polish national flag. It seems quite probable that the choice of colours had been determined by the dominant colours in the old arms of Chrzanów featuring St Nicholas, and that is why such colours were adopted. In 2009 a new flag of Chrzanów was introduced. It consists of 3 vertical stripes: a broad white one, centrally located and featuring the city's arms and two narrower pale blue stripes flanking the central stripe on both sides.

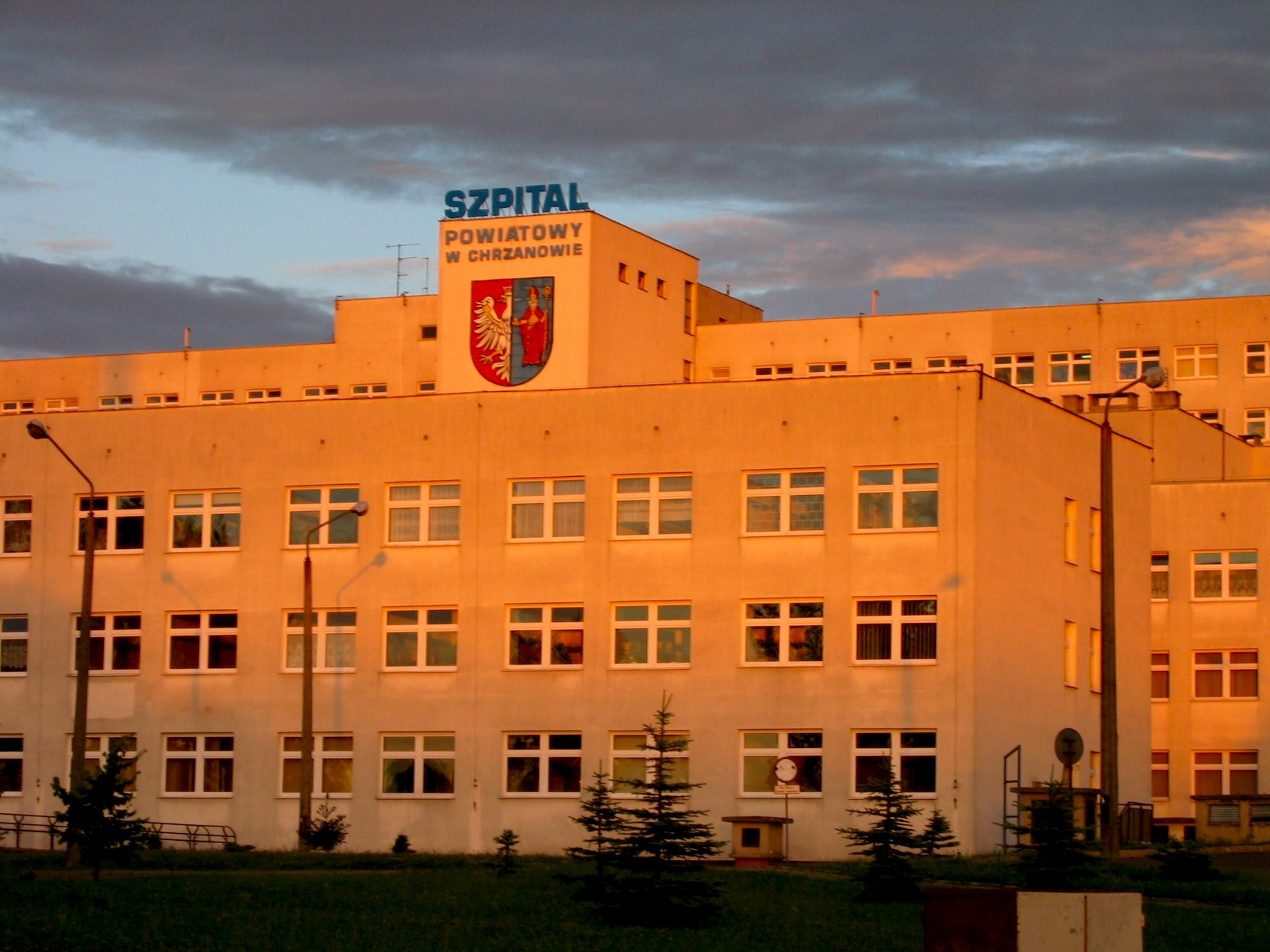
Chrzanów County Hospital.

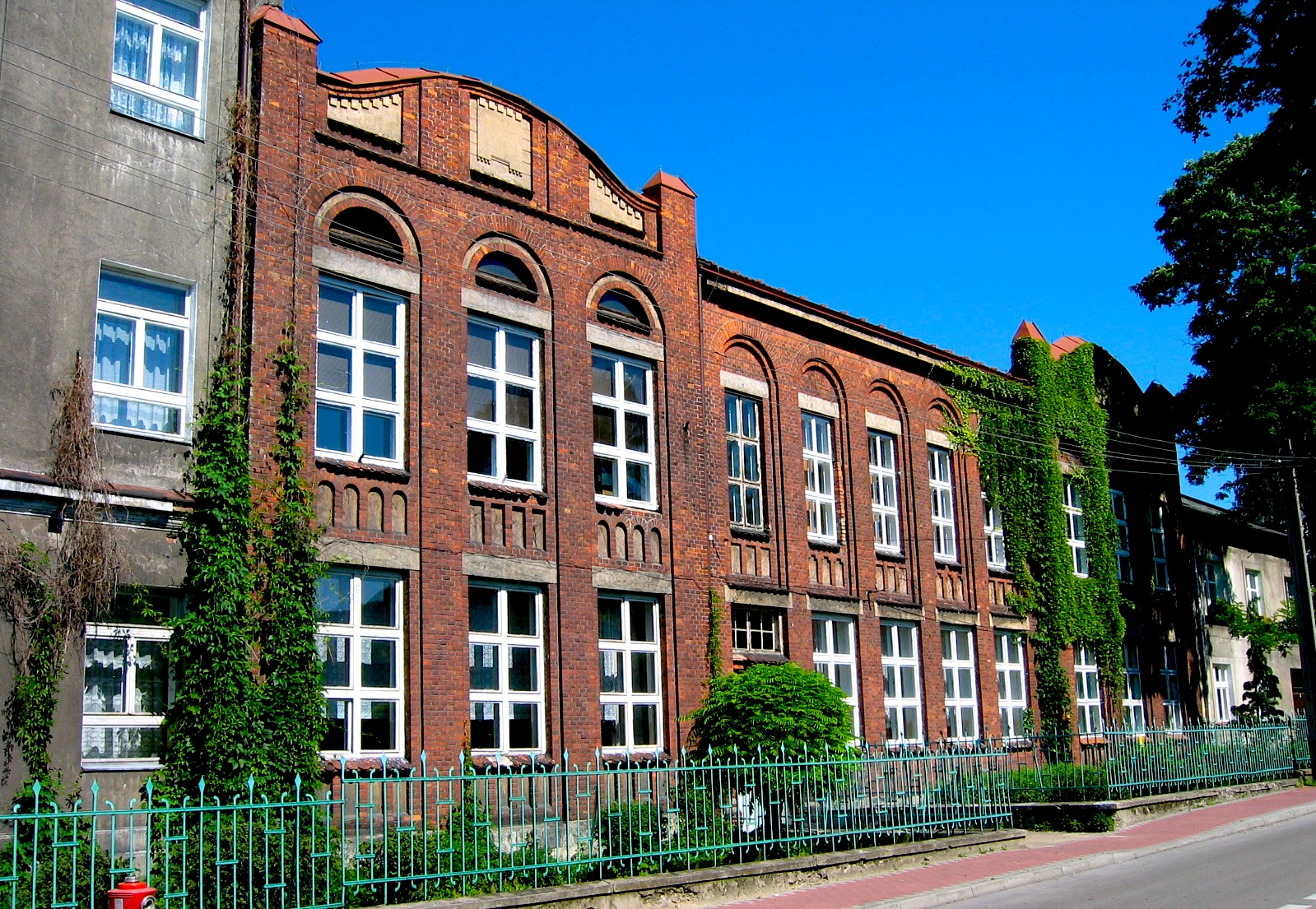
The old wing of the Stanisław Staszic Secondary School.

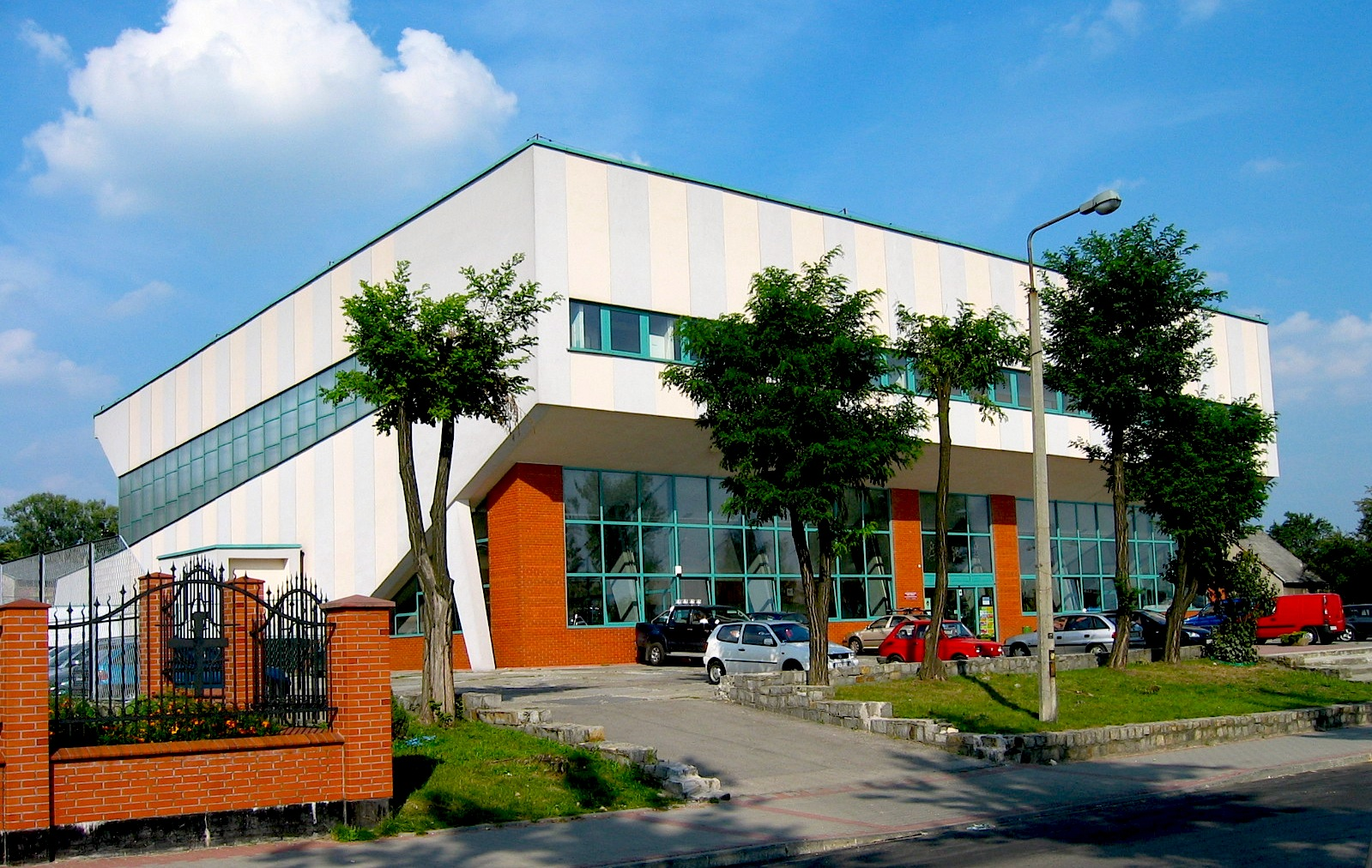
The Sports Hall.

Transport routes in Chrzanów

== Transport ==
Main road connections from the town include connection with Kraków (to the east) and Katowice (to the west) via the A4 highway or via the national road number 79. There are also two voivodeship roads starting from Chrzanów: road number 933 (going south-west) to Oświęcim, Pszczyna and Jastrzębie-Zdrój and road number 781 (going south-east) to Andrychów.

Rail connection links Chrzanów to Kraków (to the east), Oświęcim and Czechowice-Dziedzice (south-west). There are two rail stops in the town.

== Education ==
Chrzanów has, among others, seven primary schools, two secondary schools, a secondary technical school, a music school and the Academy of Business and Marketing (Wyższa Szkoła Przedsiębiorczości i Marketingu).

== Sport ==
The town has a number of sports venue, including a large sport hall. The main sports club is Fablok Chrzanów, founded in 1926 and sponsored by the locomotive company Fablok. The company also sponsored the handball team named TS Fablok. In 1991 they had 8th place in the country handball league.

== Notable people ==
- Dovid Halberstam (1821-1894), Jewish religious leader
- Ignacy Schwarzbart (1888–1961), Zionist, member of the National Council of the Republic of Poland
- Klemens Stefan Sielecki (1903–1980), technical director of Fablok
- Isaac Deutscher (1907-1967), Jewish Marxist
- Mascha Kaléko (1907-1975), Poet
- Henryk Tauber Fuchsbrunner (1917-2000), Auschwitz Sonderkommando worker and escapee, gave famous testimony; longest known survivor of the kommando
- Nathan Wasserberger (1928-2013), painter
- Janusz Szrom (born 1968), jazz singer
- Michał Gajownik (1981–2009), Olympic canoeist

== International relations ==
=== Twin towns — sister cities ===
Chrzanów is twinned with:

- Harnes, France
- Nyékládháza, Hungary
- Ivano-Frankivsk, Ukraine
