= Dellow =

Defunct English sports car manufacturer

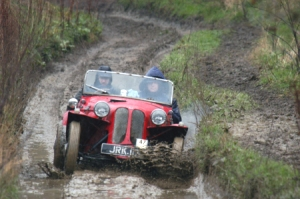
This picture of a Mk I Dellow shows the type of event in which they excelled.

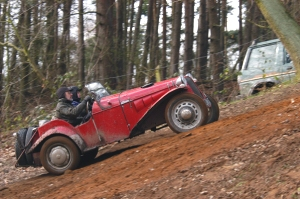
Mk I at Brickhill on Falcon Motor Clubs March Hare trial in 2004

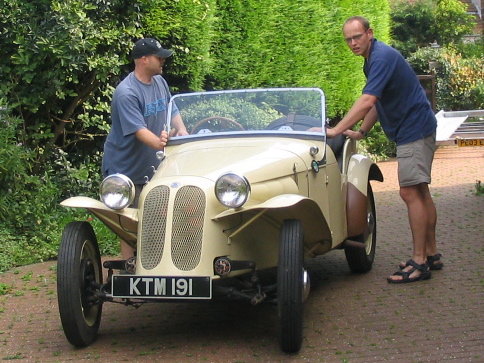
1952 Dellow Mk II - photographed in 2005

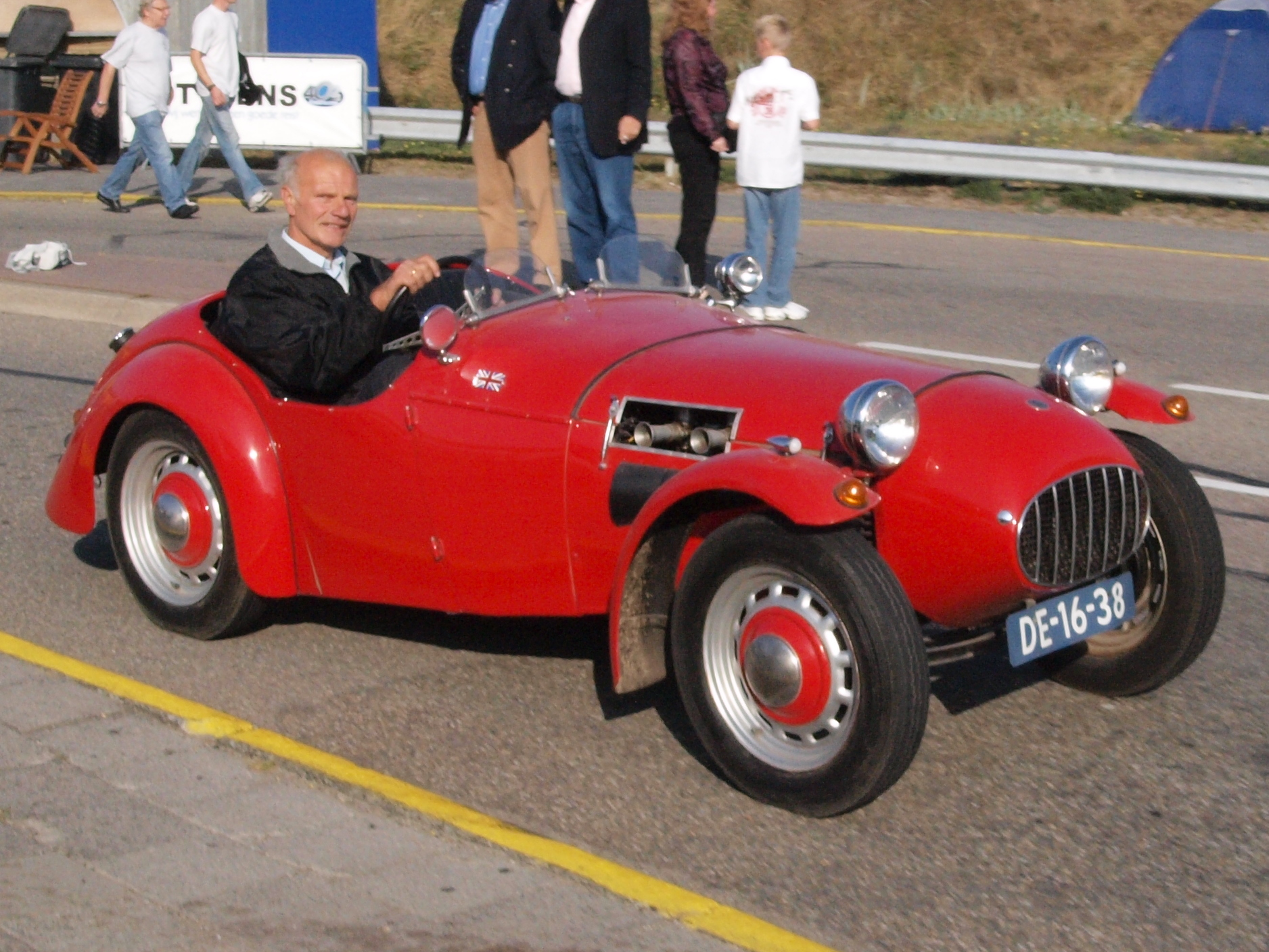
Dellow Mk V

Dellow was a make of car produced in Alvechurch, Worcestershire, England between 1949 and 1956.

Dellow Motors Ltd was started by Ken Delingpole and Ron Lowe to produce road-going sports cars for the enthusiast to use in trials, rallies and hill-climbs. The cars were produced in the Delson & Co. fastener factory.

== History ==
A small number of very early cars used Austin 7 chassis as per Ron Lowe's special, FUY 374. The other prototypes included OP 3835, HAB 245, CAB 282, and EDE 384.

From 1950, with scrap Austin 7s in short supply, an 1172 cc Ford 10 engine was utilised in an A-frame chassis with a very light tubular steel framework welded to the chassis and panelled in aluminium, early cars having no doors. The main chassis frame was made from Government-surplus chrome-molybdenum rocket tubes from WW2, these rockets being RP-3 (Rocket Projectile 3 inch) types as used by Hawker Typhoon and Bristol Beaufighter aircraft. Brakes were standard Ford cable/rod operated drums all round.

The tubular A-frame design, supposedly inspired by the pre-war BMW 328, achieved light weight and had a rearward weight bias for trials. Many sporting awards were won by drivers of Dellow cars in the early 1950s, not only in trials but also in other events such as driving tests and hillclimbs. Dellows also took overall honours in the MCC-organised Daily Express National Rally and the Circuit of Ireland Rally.

Some Dellow drivers went on to have successful careers in other forms of motor sport. Tony Marsh, from Kinver, went on to become RAC Hill Climb Champion on no less than 6 occasions. Peter Collins, from Kidderminster, later drove for Hersham and Walton, British Racing Motors, Vanwall, and Ferrari.

Dellow styling was created by Lionel Evans at his Radpanels coachbuilding business in Kidderminster. The car evolved through several variants known as Mk I to Mk V. Early cars had the Ford beam front axle with a transverse leaf spring, short Panhard rod quarter elliptics at the rear, and André Hartford friction dampers all round. The Ford torque tube was suitably shortened and the vast majority of cars used the three-speed Ford gearbox, but a very small number of cars (KOX 300 being an example) were produced to customer order with a four-speed gearbox from the 10M series Morris. The use of a four-speed Morris box was pioneered by the "Lightweight" of Tony Marsh. Wheels were 5-stud from Ford and could be 16" diameter from the Prefect (narrow rim), 16" from the van (wider rim), 17" from the Popular, or 18" also from the van. Later owners often fitted Ballamy 15" wheels in order to use more modern radial tyres. Dellows usually carried twin spare wheels. Some rolling chassis were sold to individuals who wished to build their own body. One or two 'Replicas' were built after the factory closed.

The Ford E93A engines were mildly tuned, and many used twin SU carburettors on a cast alloy Dellow manifold. However, as an option the factory also offered the car with a Wade-Ventor (Roots type) supercharger installation. The Mk II saw the introduction of a new and much more robust rear chassis section with coil springs, separate telescopic shock absorbers and a Panhard rod. This stiffer chassis allowed doors to become an optional fitting. The Mk V version was derived from the "Lightweight" Dellow (WRF 81) constructed by Tony Marsh for speed events in 1954. It saw coil springs introduced at the front (over telescopic dampers) although still with a one-piece Ford beam axle. About 300 Dellows in total are believed to have been constructed at Alvechurch.

Complete cars were available from selected dealers across the country and a now-rare sales leaflet was accordingly produced. Finished cars were also sold in export markets, mainly the United States. One Dellow owner even towed a caravan for family holidays and a firm of agricultural engineers bought several Dellows for their reps to drive.

A new company, Dellow Engineering, based in Oldbury near Birmingham produced a Mk VI. It is often incorrectly quoted as having a glass fibre body, but it too was in fact built with alloy panelling. Very few Mk VI's were made.

== Cars ==
- Dellow Prototypes- 1947 - Ford 10 powered Austin 7 chassis.
- Dellow Mk I - 1949 - Ford 10 powered basic 2 seater (no doors).
- Dellow Mk II - 1951 - Rear coil springs, telescopic dampers,(optional doors).
- Dellow Mk III - 1952 - 2+2 model.
- Dellow Mk IV - 1954? - 2+2 one-off with Ford Consul engine.
- Dellow Mk V - 1954 - Coil sprung beam front axle, tuned engine, Mk Vs generally still only had the three-peed Ford box although the "Lightweight" WRF 81, now owned by Nigel Brown, had a four-speed Morris unit.
- Dellow Mk VI - 1957 - Independent front suspension, ladder chassis.

== See also ==
- List of car manufacturers of the United Kingdom
