= Aston Clinton =

Village in Buckinghamshire, England

Coordinates: 51.799°N 0.721°W

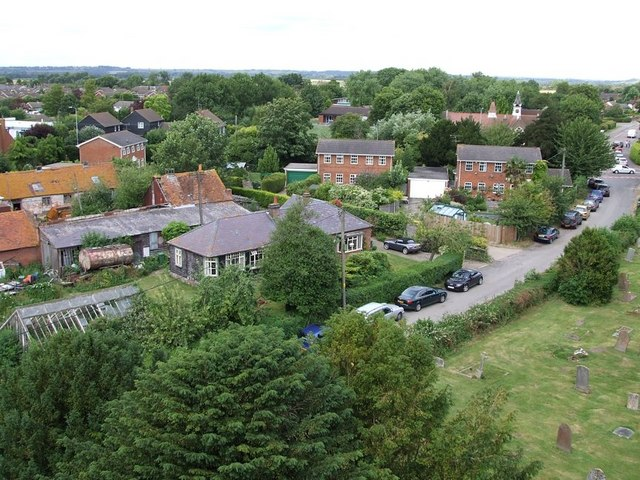
- Aston Clinton from the church tower

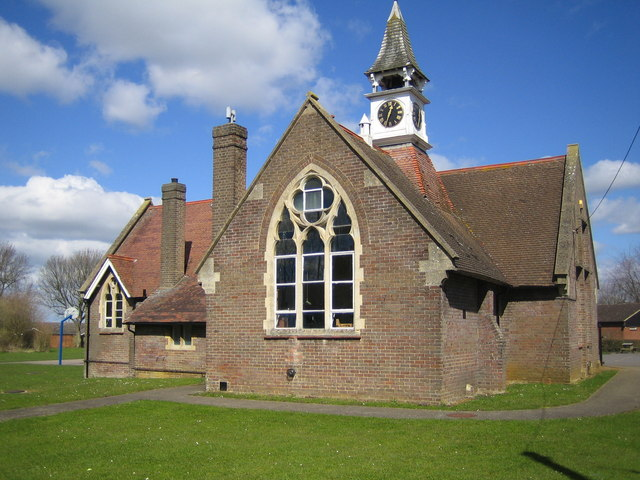
- The Old School (Locally known as The Clockschool)

- Location within Buckinghamshire
- Population: 3,682 (2011 Census)
- OS grid reference: SP8012
- Civil parish: Aston Clinton
- Unitary authority: Buckinghamshire
- Ceremonial county: Buckinghamshire
- Region: South East
- Country: England
- Sovereign state: United Kingdom
- Post town: AYLESBURY
- Postcode district: HP22
- Dialling code: 01296
- Police: Thames Valley
- Fire: Buckinghamshire
- Ambulance: South Central
- UK Parliament: Aylesbury
- Website: Aston Clinton Parish Council

Aston Clinton is a village and civil parish in the Aylesbury Vale, Buckinghamshire, England. The village lies at the foot of the Chiltern Hills, between the Wendover and Aylesbury arms of the Grand Union Canal. Surrounding towns include Wendover to the south, Aylesbury to the west, and Tring to the east, just over the county border in Hertfordshire.

== History ==
It is believed that the village started at the crossing of two Roman roads, Akeman Street and Icknield Way, both of which are still main roads in the village. After the fall of the Roman Empire, it became a Saxon settlement and remains of a Saxon cemetery were found during the construction of the Aston Clinton Bypass.

Before the Norman Conquest of England in 1066, the settlement was probably held under patronage of King Edward the Confessor. The village is recorded in the Domesday Book of 1086, where in Old English it was called Estone, which means "eastern estate".

The manor, later to be known as Aston Clinton, was for a short period after 1100 under the control of Edward de Salisbury, who was King Henry I's standard-bearer. In 1217 King Henry III gave it to Sir William de Farendon. However, by 1237 the manor was owned by the de Clinton family, hence the name at that time of Aston de Clinton. William de Clinton partitioned Aston Clinton to form a new manor called Chivery as a dowry for his daughter Alice. Sometime after 1239, King Edward I granted the estates to the Montacutes, who were the ancestors of the Earls of Salisbury. Their descendant the Countess of Salisbury was beheaded by King Henry VIII in 1541. Successive families have owned the manor, passing by marriage from the Hastings to the Barringtons, Gerards, and then to Lord Lake of Aston Clinton later to become Gerard Lake, 1st Viscount Lake.

On 22 September 1934, a twin-engined biplane named Youth of New Zealand of Sir Alan Cobham's National Aviation Displays, crashed into a field near the canal at Aston Clinton. The Youth of New Zealand had just departed from Heston Aerodrome after being refuelled when it crashed, killing all four crew. The probable cause was the failure of a bolt through metal fatigue.

The car manufacturer Aston Martin took one part of its name from the nearby Aston Hill combining it with that of its co-founder Lionel Martin. The firm had great success in the Aston Clinton Hillclimb competition up nearby Aston Hill. A plaque now marks the site.

The modern parish of Aston Clinton was created in 1934. Of the other medieval manors:- Dundridge; Chivery; St Leonards and Vaches, historically all closely associated with Aston Clinton, only Chivery and Vaches have remained distinct parts of Aston Clinton, which now forms part of Aylesbury Vale District. Dundridge manor became part of the ecclesiastical parish of St Leonards which has itself since 1934 become part of the parish of Cholesbury-cum-St Leonards.

== The village today ==
There are many historic buildings with listed status in Aston Clinton including Anthony Hall, a concert hall situated in the centre of the village which was donated to the community by the widow of Anthony Nathan de Rothschild. To the south-east of the village in Green Park was the former Aston Clinton House. The village also contains St. Michael and All Angels parish church, dating from the late medieval period.

The village was used as a filming location for the 1962 film Lolita. The TV programme Hotel Babylon was filmed in Aston Clinton.

Aston Clinton Household Recycling Centre opened in 2009 and was built to the north of the village off the A41 Aston Clinton bypass.

In 2011 a new industrial park opened in Aston Clinton called Halton Brook Business Park, designed and developed by Horstonbridge Development Management which replaced an old dairy, demolished in 2006, that once stood in the same location. Two companies currently occupy Halton Brook, Zethon & DeSoutter Medical.

There are four pubs, three of which are on Green End Street: The Bell, The Partridge and The Oak. The Rothschild Arms is situated on Weston Road.

== Notable residents ==
Composer and lutenist Daniel Bacheler was born in the village in 1572.

The BAFTA and Oscar winning special effects make-up artist David Malinowski lives in the village.

Australian Formula One driver Mark Webber lists Aston Clinton as his home in England where he lives with his partner Ann Neal.

Robert Hendry Morton (25 September 1927 – 6 May 2002) was an English professional footballer, born in Aston Clinton, and who played for Luton Town. Morton holds the record for most appearances for the club, with 495 in the Football League and 550 overall.

== Demographics ==
According to the 2011 census there were 1,518 households in Aston Clinton with a Population of 3,682: 1,784 males and 1,898 females. In accordance with the government plans to boost housing supply, due to the rising population, there has been an increase in new housing developments in Aston Clinton: The Burnhams (19 dwellings), Stratford Close (20 dwellings), 28 flats near the surgery, four detached houses to the south of London Road Pavilion Gardens (14 dwellings) and The Willows (three large detached houses). Between 2016 and 2021, further developments added 93 houses at Aston Brook (fields adjacent to Brook Street & College Road South, built by Bovis Homes) and 143 houses at Estone Grange (fields leading from Chapel Drive, built by Bellway). A further 93 houses are under construction at Little Green (fields adjacent to Aylesbury Road, Michael Shanly Homes) during 2022 and 2023

== Geography ==
Aston Clinton is located at the northern edge of the Chiltern Hills, Buckinghamshire, to the east of Aylesbury.

Aston Clinton Civil Parish is bordered by other civil parishes to the:

- North by: Bierton with Broughton, Hulcott (Bucks) & Tring Rural (Herts)
- East by: Buckland (Bucks)
- South by: Cholesbury-cum-St Leonards & Wendover (Bucks)
- West by: Halton & Weston Turville (Bucks)

== Transport ==
Historically, the A41 passed through Aston Clinton. A bypass was built around the north of the village, it was opened on the 3 October 2003.

The village lies on several bus routes, with direct services to Aylesbury, Tring, Berkhamsted, Hemel Hempstead, Cheddington, Dunstable and Watford.

== Education ==
Aston Clinton School is a combined primary school located in the village. The head teacher is Carol Macdonald (known to students as Mrs Mac). The school badge bears resemblance to the Rothschild coat of arms, since the family built the first schools in the village.

== See also ==
- Aston Clinton House
- St Michael and All Angels Church, Aston Clinton
- Buckinghamshire
- Aylesbury Vale
- Aylesbury (UK Parliament constituency)
