= Aston Clinton Hillclimb =

Former auto racing event in Aston Clinton, England

Coordinates: 51.789°N 0.715°W

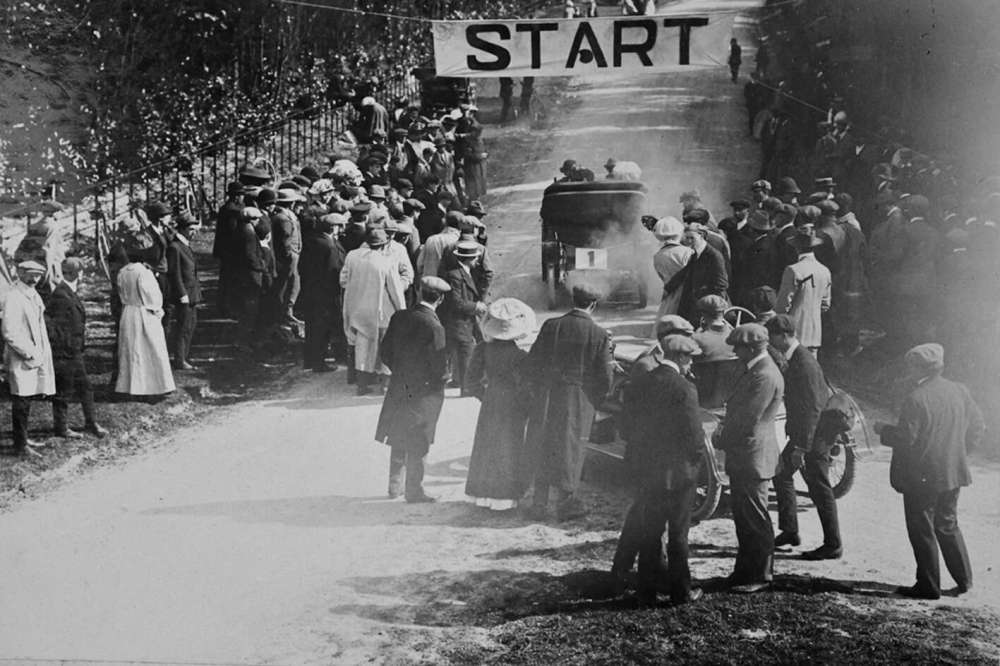
Aston Hillclimb race

Aston Hill Climb (not "Aston Clinton Hillclimb") was a speed hill climb on public roads up Aston Hill near Aston Clinton in Buckinghamshire which was active from 1904 until 1925. The hill's enduring claim to fame came when Lionel Martin and his partner Robert Bamford achieved success with their self-built 'special' car, and hence named their fledgling car manufacturing business Aston Martin.

== Course ==
The original course started about 20 metres away from the 'T' junction with the B4009 - Upper Icknield Way, and finished level with the house at the top of Aston hill, a distance of 0.75 miles (1.21 km) and a climb of approximately 80 metres. The distance was subsequently reduced to 1,000 yards (910 m). A 750 yards (690 m) version was used in 1921, a 1,200 yards (1,100 m) course in 1922, and both 1,400 yards (1,300 m) and 968.5 yards (885.6 m) in 1923.

== Records ==
- 1904 - 0.75 miles (1.21 km) - climb record was 87.6 seconds in a 1904 Napier driven by S.F. Edge
- 1912 - 1,000 yards (910 m) - the course record was 58.6 seconds in a 20 hp Crossley.

== Aston Martin ==
The 'Aston Martin Monument' is located at the roadside near the top of the hill beside the Aston Hill mountain bike park car park. It incorporates a plaque which is inscribed :

The Origin of Aston Martin
From 1904 to 1925 Aston hill, part of the Lord Rothschild's Estate, was a renowned motoring venue.
Lionel Martin made his first ascent of this hill in a tuned Singer Car on 4 April 1914. Shortly afterwards, on the 16th. May, at the Herts County Automobile & Aero Club meeting, he was so successful that in March the following year the sporting light car club first registered a car in his name called an "Aston-Martin".
It was the start of a legend in the history of the automobile.
This plaque was placed here by the Aston Martin Owners Club and Aston Martin Lagonda Limited.

The name for the marque was in part suggested by Lionel's wife Kate, because it would place the company at the top of alphabetic lists and catalogues.
