= Chivery =

Settlement in Buckinghamshire, England

Coordinates: 51.768°N 0.697°W

Chivery is a hamlet located in the Chiltern Hills in the present-day parish of Aston Clinton, in Aylesbury Vale District in the county of Buckinghamshire, England. Chivery's southern boundary is formed by the ancient earthworks known as Grim's Ditch. To the north it is bounded by Wendover Woods.

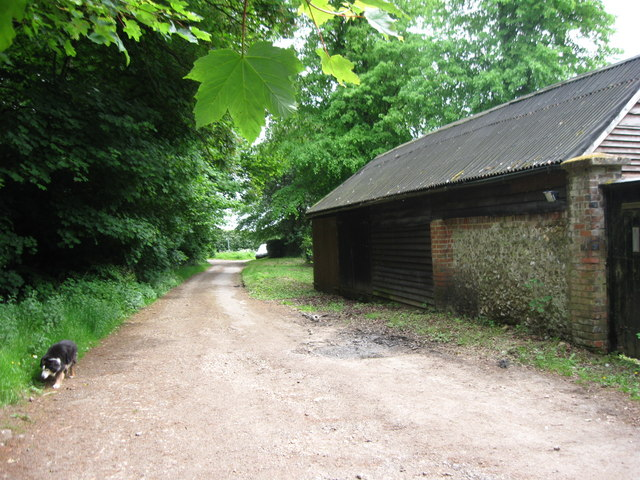
Barn by the Ridgeway at Chivery, 2009

== History ==
Historically, Chivery was part of the manor of Aston Clinton. The manor of Aston Chiverey was created at the end of the 12th century by William de Clinton as a dowry for his daughter Alice, who married Reginald de Mohun. On his death in 1213, Alice married Robert de Beauchamp. From 1250 until around 1380 the manor was held by the Audley family until through marriage it passed to John Rose, an esquire of Richard II of England. By 1410, during Henry IV's reign, it had passed to the Crown before being recovered by John Rose's descendant Thomas St Clair. Thomas' lands were divided on his death in 1483 and his daughter Eleanor inherited the manor of Aston Chiverey; through marriage the land became part of the estates of John Gage. His grandson Sir John Gage sold the manor to Margaret Pole, 8th Countess of Salisbury, in 1534, whereon it became recombined with the manor of Aston Clinton once more. The Countess was executed on Henry VIII's orders in 1541 and all her lands were forfeit and split up. Ownership of the manor resided with William Batchelor until 1555 when the properties passed in his will to his brother-in-law Thomas Gewat. However, by 1582 the fields were being farmed by Silvester and John Baldwin and the woodlands by another John Gage.

By this time also the manor had become part of the St Leonards parish, which had split from Aston Clinton. During the 19th century Chivery became part of a new parish of Aston Clinton St Leonards. In 1934 Chivery was hived off from St Leonards, which was combined with other parishes to become Cholesbury-cum-St Leonards parish within Amersham Rural District, while Chivery became part of Aston Clinton parish, also in Aylesbury Rural District.

From 1776 Chivery had a pub, The Plough, which survived into the 20th century and became a restaurant before finally closing in the 1930s.
