= Lionel Martin =

English businessman (1878–1945)

Lionel Walker Birch Martin (15 March 1878 – 21 October 1945) was an English businessman who co-founded the company that became Aston Martin.

== Early life ==
He was born at Nansladron at Pentewan near St Austell in Cornwall, and was an only child. His father was Edward Martin (born in 1843), the owner of Martin Brothers China Clay Merchants in St Austell, who lived at Treverbyn, and who also owned the Lee Moor porcelain factory in Plympton. Martin Brothers, founded in 1837, became part of English China Clays.

His mother was Elizabeth Emily Birch (born in 1851 in Salford), she had previously been married to Walter Braithwaite who died; her father was William Singleton Birch, who had founded chalk and lime merchants, Singleton Birch, later run by his uncle Thomas Birch. His parents had married on 26 April 1877 at Lillington, Warwickshire; he was baptised on 20 May 1878 at Lillington church. He grew up in Knightsbridge.

In 1891 he went to Eton College. In 1897 he went to Brasenose College, Oxford, where he was an enthusiast member of the Oxford University Bicycle Club, then joined the Bath Road Club (BRC) In 1900 he went to Marcon's Hall, also known as Charsley's Hall, run by Charles Abdy Marcon. He graduated with a BA in 1902.

== Cycling ==
At university his tandem partner in 1901 was Henry Curtis-Bennett, where they tried to set records in September 1901. He rode with the BRC in 1902. On Wednesday 27 August he left Land's End at 7.06am and rode to London, getting to Hyde Park Corner at 5.22am, completing the immense journey in 22 hours and 16 minutes, much faster than the previous record of 25 hours and 25 minutes. The current record for cycling Land's End to John o' Groats is nine days. He rode the distance on an Imperial Rover.

On Saturday 11 April 1903 at 7am, he rode from Edinburgh post office and arrived at York post office at 7.17pm, in 12 hours 17 minutes, shortening the record by 43 minutes, for a tandem bicycle (a Swift Royal), with Thomas Vade-Walpole (1879–1915), who was part the Walpole family of Norfolk; Thomas's brother Horatio would also be killed in 1918; Horatio (1881–1918) was the grandfather of Robert Walpole, 10th Baron Walpole, the father of diplomat Alice Walpole. This record was beaten by 42 minutes on Friday 7 July 1905 by Knipe and Irving.

He gave up cycling in 1904, but returned to the sport in 1910, due to his driving ban. On Monday 27 June 1910, he attempted the Edinburgh to York record again, but faced a strong head wind, so after 149 miles and 11 hours, he finished in Northallerton. He now cycled with Robert Bamford and together formed a sales business in December 1912.

== Motorcycling ==
In a motorcycle and side car, Martin and Robert Bamford would take part in the annual competition from London to Gloucester, and back, held by the North West London Motor Cycle Club. The route would start from Jack Straw's Castle, Hampstead via Brockley Hill, Aston Hill, Princes Risborough, and Cirencester. It would return via Birdlip Hill, Aston Rowant, and High Wycombe, a distance of 235 miles.

A hill climb was held by the Cyclecar Club at Aston Clinton, on Saturday 4 April 1914; the winning team included H. F. S. Morgan, W. G. McMinnies, George Hands of Calthorpe cars, and John Talfourd Wood (of Walton-on-Thames) of GWK. He also competed in a cyclecar around Pebblecombe Hill, near Betchworth for the Westall Cup, with the Cyclecar Club, and with Auto-Cycle Union events around the Peak District, and with the British Motor Cycling Racing Club at Brooklands. With the Motor Cycling Club, he took part in the classic trial to Edinburgh, starting at the Old Gate House Hotel in north London, via Carlisle and Galashiels.

== Career ==
Through the Bath Road Club he met Montague Napier, and in 1903 went into partnership with Napier to sell cars.

In 1909 after not paying a fine, when caught speeding on 15 April 1909 on Kew Road at 26mph, he was banned from driving for two years at Guildford, under the Motor Car Act 1903. Being represented by Hardinge Giffard, 1st Earl of Halsbury (Lord Tiverton), he appealed at the High Court on 12 January 1910, but lost the appeal, given by John Alexander Strachey Bucknill and Sir Reginald More Bray at the King's Bench Division.

For the next two years he rode bicycles, gaining the fastest record from Edinburgh to York in 1911.

=== Aston Martin ===
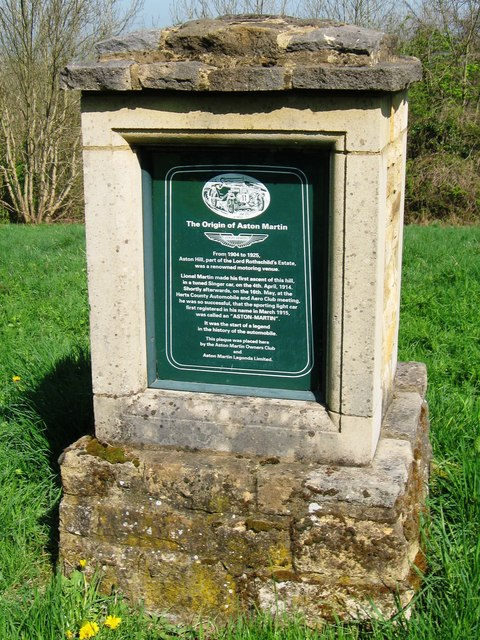
He first completed Aston Hill on 4 April 1914

During his driving ban he had become friends with another cyclist in the Bath Road Club, Robert Bamford. In 1912 they began to sell cars together. They co-founded Bamford and Martin Limited, at Henniker Mews in Kensington. Martin participated in competitions of the Motor Cycling Club, including those from London to Edinburgh. Their first advert was in the Bath Road News.

Their first prototype was registered in March 1915. To provide an evocative name for the car, the pair remembered their races at Aston Hill, and called the car the Aston-Martin; the AM radiator badge went onto their cars.

It was through the money from the Singleton Birch family minerals company Martin had the funds to expand his business.

In November 1925, Bamford and Martin Ltd went into receivership, and Martin was no longer a director of the company. At this time, Martin was working for Singleton Birch. After 1925, he never owned an Aston Martin car.

== Personal life ==
In 1909, Martin married Christine Murray (born 1888) of Auchendinny in Midlothian; Christine died in April 1913, shortly after the birth of their son (born 19 March 1913). Martin then married Katherine King (born 14 July 1888) on 25 January 1917 in Kensington. Katherine died in 1959.

In 1904 he lived at 7 St Leonard's Mansions on St Leonard's Terrace in Chelsea. In 1905 he lived at 51 Cheyne Court, Chelsea. In 1909 he lived at 3 Ryder Street in St James's In the 1920s he lived at Pembroke Villas in Kensington. In his later years, he was a diabetic.

Due to petrol rationing in the Second World War, he returned to travelling on his bicycle; on 14 October 1945, he was knocked off at a set of traffic lights on Gloucester Road near his home, dying aged 67 in Kingston County Hospital on 21 October 1945. He had lived from 1932 at Palings Cottage on Warboys Road at Kingston Hill, in the Municipal Borough of Malden and Coombe. His funeral was at 3 pm on Monday 29 October 1945 at St. John the Baptist in Kingston Vale. He was buried at Putney Vale Cemetery.
