= Razor blade (disambiguation) =

Razor blade may refer to:

- A blade for a razor
- The Razor Blade, a 1920s racing car
- Razor blade steel, a type of steel originally designed specifically for razor blades
