= St Michael and All Angels Church, Aston Clinton =

Church in Aston Clinton, Buckinghamshire

St Michael and All Angels Church
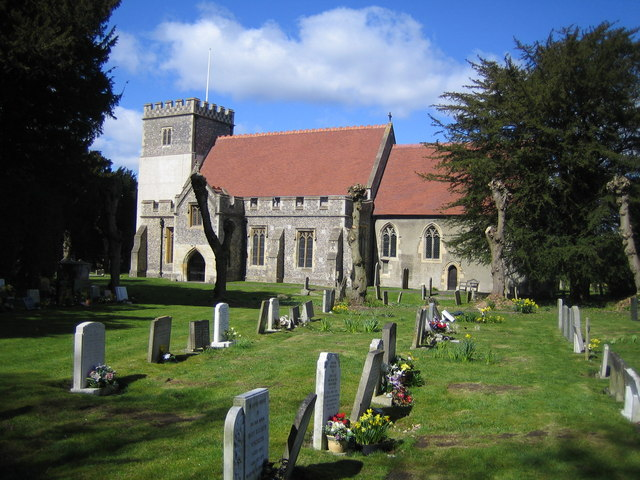
- St Michael and All Angels Church
- 51.79934°N 0.726278°W
- OS grid reference: SK 46816 85251
- Location: Aston Clinton
- Country: England
- Denomination: Church of England

Administration
- Province: Canterbury
- Diocese: Oxford
- Parish: Aston Clinton

St Michael and All Angels’ Church is a Church of England parish church located in Aston Clinton, Buckinghamshire, England. The original church building dates to 1250 AD. It contains 13th and 14th century features, including clerestory windows, 3 bay arcades, an Easter Sepulchre, a three-seat sedilia and a piscina. The church lies within the Anglican Diocese of Oxford. The building is a Grade II* listed building.

== Description ==
Located in Aston Clinton, Buckinghamshire, England, the original parish church dates to 1250 AD. It was constructed with flint and ashlar dressings. The current church has original features from the 13th and 14th centuries, including 3 bay arcades, traceried clerestory windows, three-seat sedilia for priests and a stone piscina. On the north wall is the Easter Sepulchre, which serves as a repository for the consecrated bread and wine, from Good Friday until Easter morning. A fragment of wall painting in the chancel survives. A restored Priest's Room, located above the south porch, measures 8 ft (2.4 m) by 10 ft (3.0 m), and served as the priest's residence during the church's early years. The room is accessed through a low door on the west side of the south porch, and up a stone spiral staircase with the original 800 year-old handrail.

== History ==
A church on this site dates to 1250 AD and is believed to have been dedicated by Robert Grosseteste, the Bishop of Lincoln. The building has undergone several renovations over the years. The nave is believed to have been built in the 13th century but was destroyed during the Reformation. It was rebuilt in the 14th century. The quadrifoil-shaped leaded windows were also added at this time and contain the original rose-tinted glass. The tower was rebuilt in 1800 and the bells were re-hung. The chancel was remodeled in 1849. The naves and porches were rebuilt in 1867 and the south porch was expanded to two storeys. On the north wall of the nave is a plaque commemorating the ten American airmen who were killed on the 3rd of January 1945, when their plane crashed in Aston Clinton after takeoff from Cheddington. The plaque was dedicated on the 4th of June 2000.

== Gallery ==
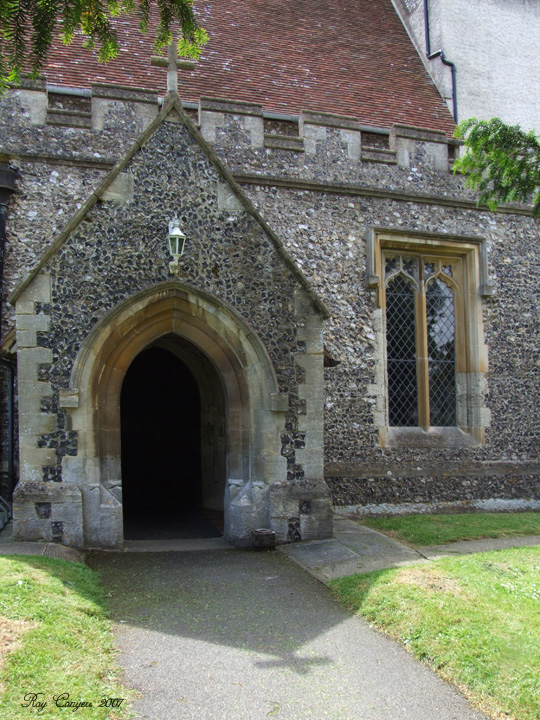
View of North Porch

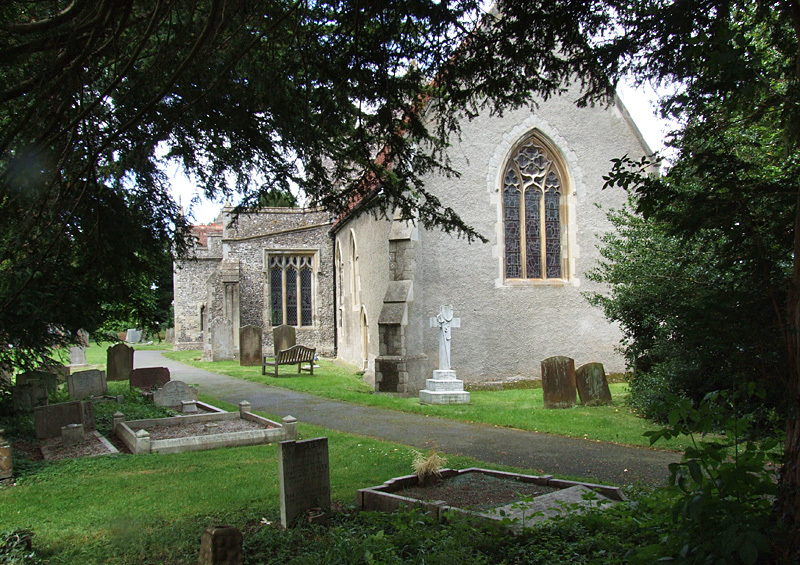
East view

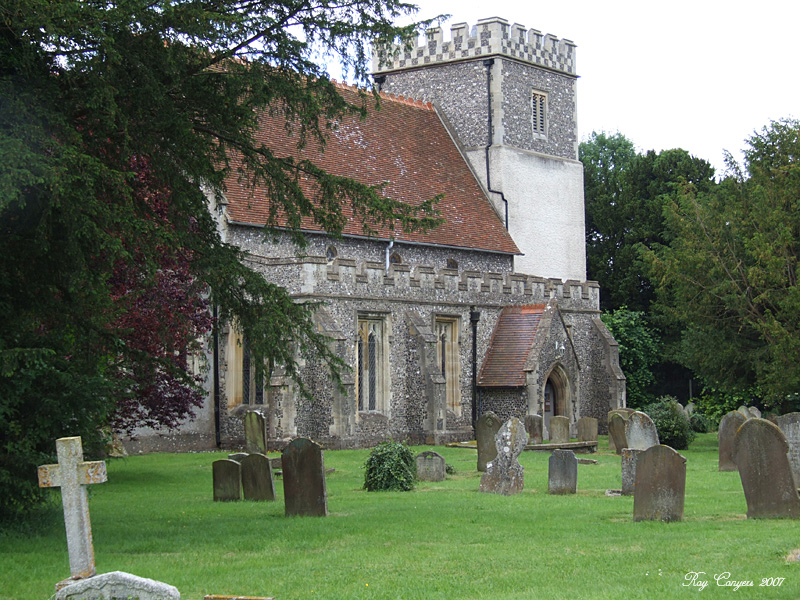
North View

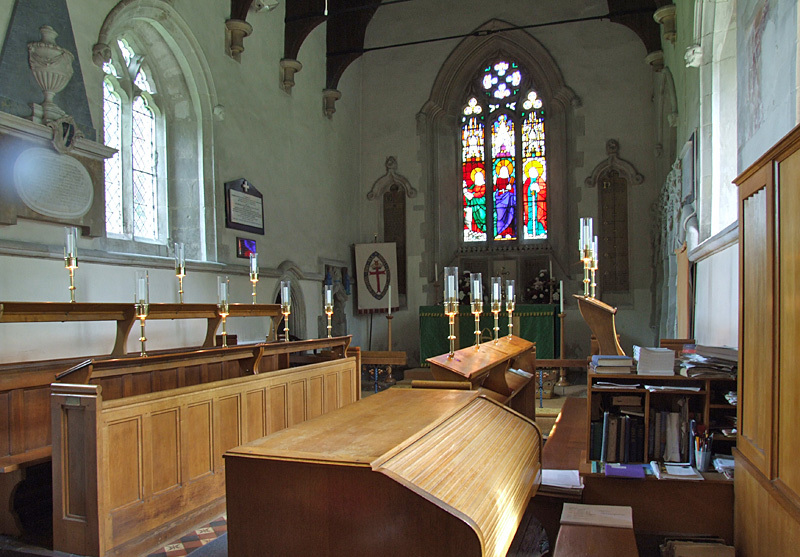
Choir and Altar

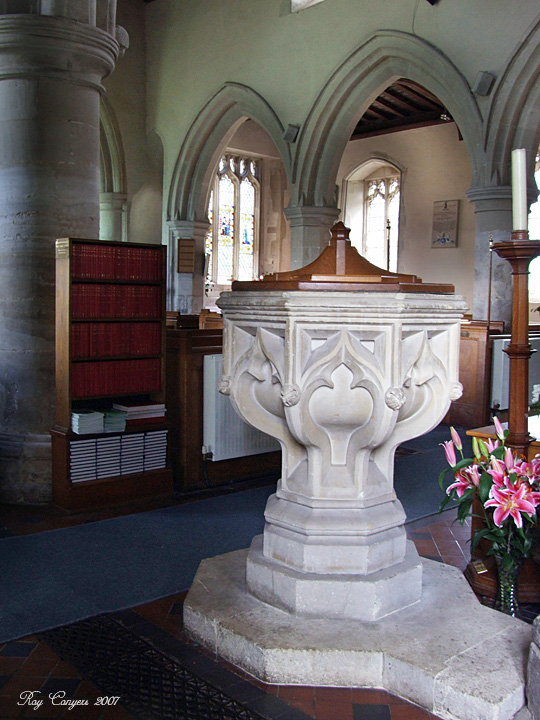
Font

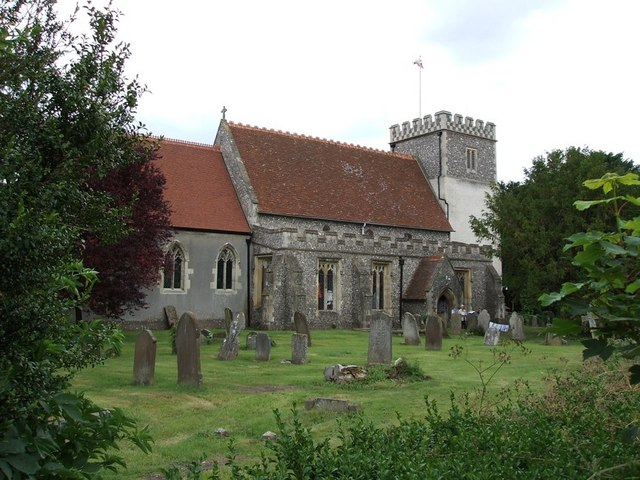
Church exterior
