= Razor Blade =

1923 Aston Martin car

The Aston Martin Razor Blade team car was built in 1923 to break the one-hour light car record of 101.39 mph (163.17 km/h) held by AC Cars. Although it failed to break the record, it did have success in race and record attempts in the 1920s.

The August 1923 issue of The Light Car & Cyclecar magazine stated:

The latest Aston Martin racer… represents the greatest advance in high efficiency small car design.

== History ==
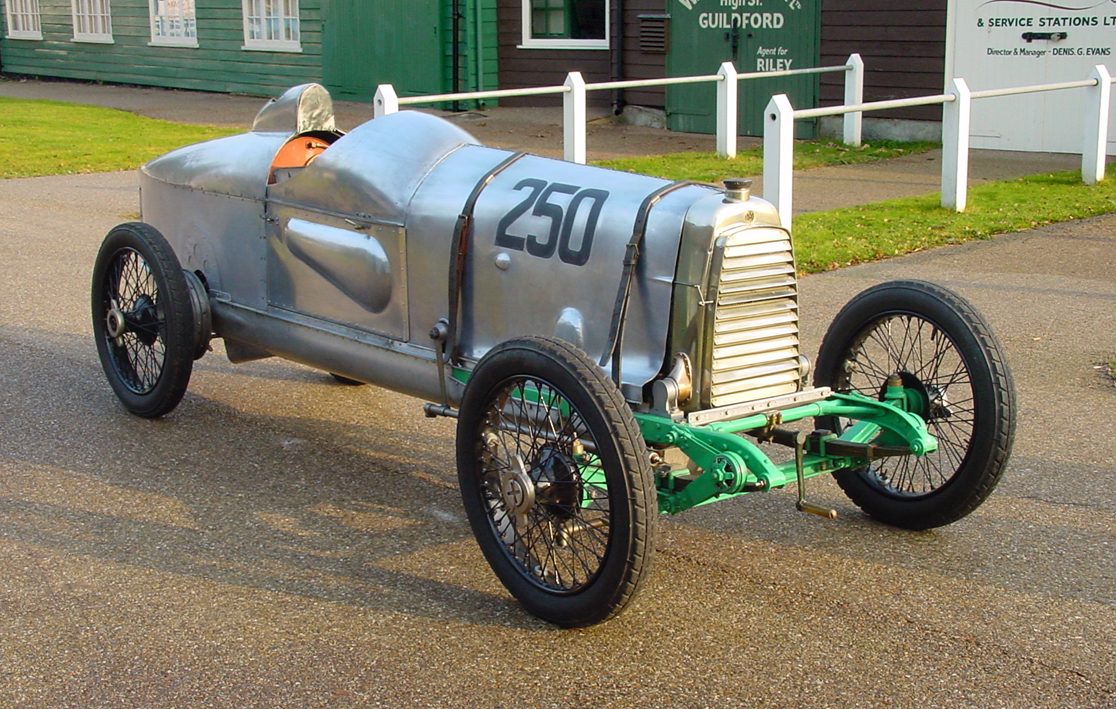
The Razor Blade today as a Grand Prix car exhibit at the Brooklands Museum, Surrey.

Standard Aston Martin parts were used on a specially built narrow chassis with quarter elliptic springs at the rear. Chassis number 1915, registration number XO 9958. The engine had previously been developed for the 1922 French Grand Prix by Aston Martin. It was based on half a 1921 three-litre eight-cylinder Ballot engine giving a four-cylinder configuration, with twin overhead camshafts, 16 valves, and 1.5 litres capacity. It produced 55 bhp (41 kW) at 4,200 rpm.

The body was built by the de Havilland Aircraft Company and is 18 1/2 inches (47 cm) at its widest point. It is said to be the narrowest racing car ever built. The original design was for the body to be fully enclosed, but Lionel Martin was unable to find a driver small enough to fit in it. Originally code-named the Oyster, the car was soon called the Razor Blade.

The car was driven by S. C. H. Davis for the attempt at the one-hour light car record. The car lapped consistently at the Brooklands circuit at 103–104 mph but the front offside tyre came off and after having a new tyre fitted, the same wheel shed its tyre several more times at speeds higher than 100 mph (160 km/h), until the record attempt was abandoned.

The Razor Blade was raced regularly during the 1950s and was sold to the Harrah Motor Museum in the US, that subsequently became the National Automobile Museum. It was returned to the UK in the 1980s, restored by the present owner and it is now in use in VSCC and other historic car events.

The Light Car and Cyclecar magazine, 7 September 1923, printed the following verse under the title of LIGHT CAR-ICATURES after the Razor Blade came first in the BARC meeting at Brooklands:

Major F. B. Halford
(The intrepid driver of the "razor blade" Aston-Martin racer)
With razor blades we’re all acquainted;
Some are good, others painted.
Halford Smiles; he’s found a winner;
Diet follows – make him thinner.

== Pictures ==
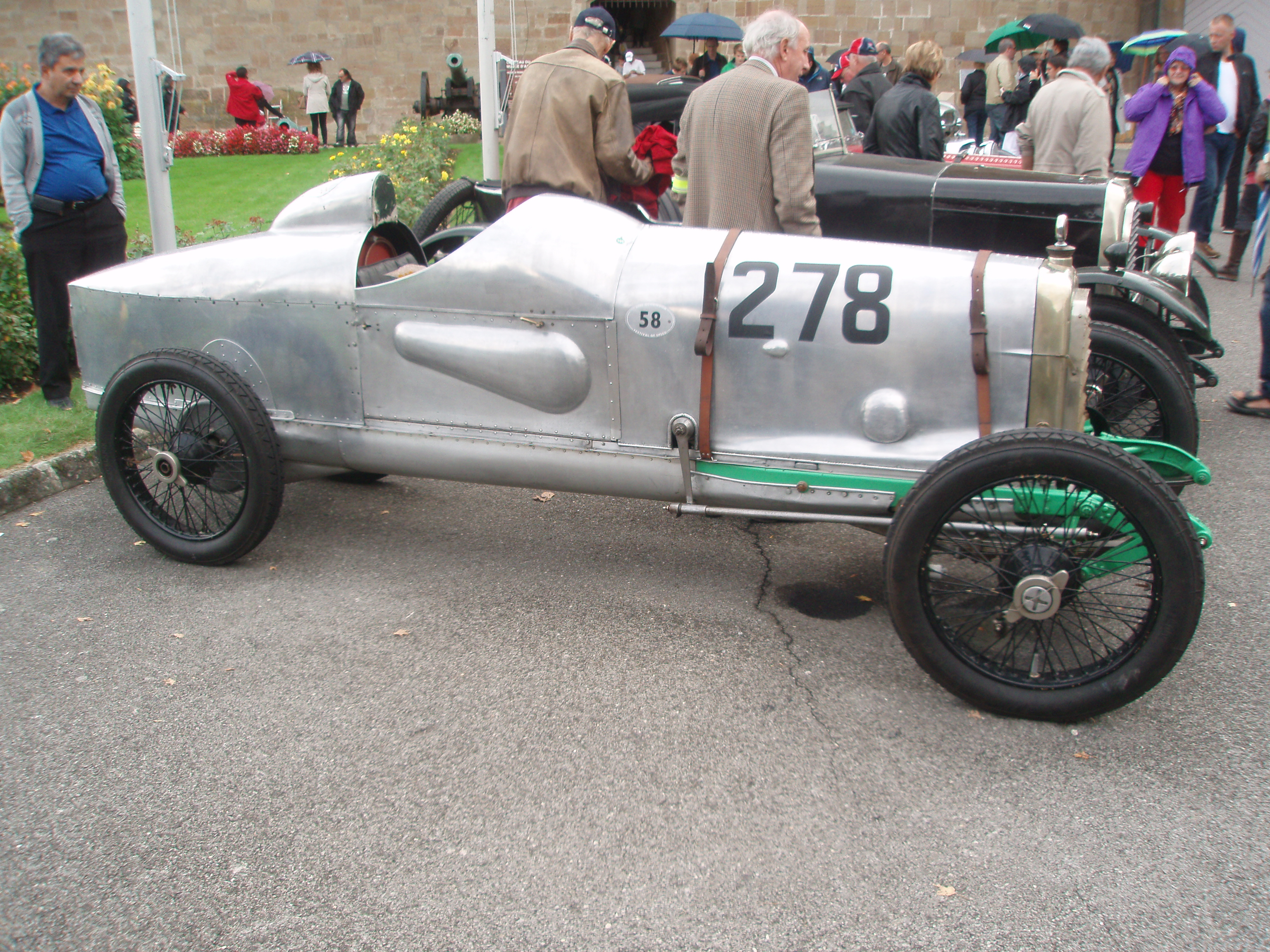
Right side

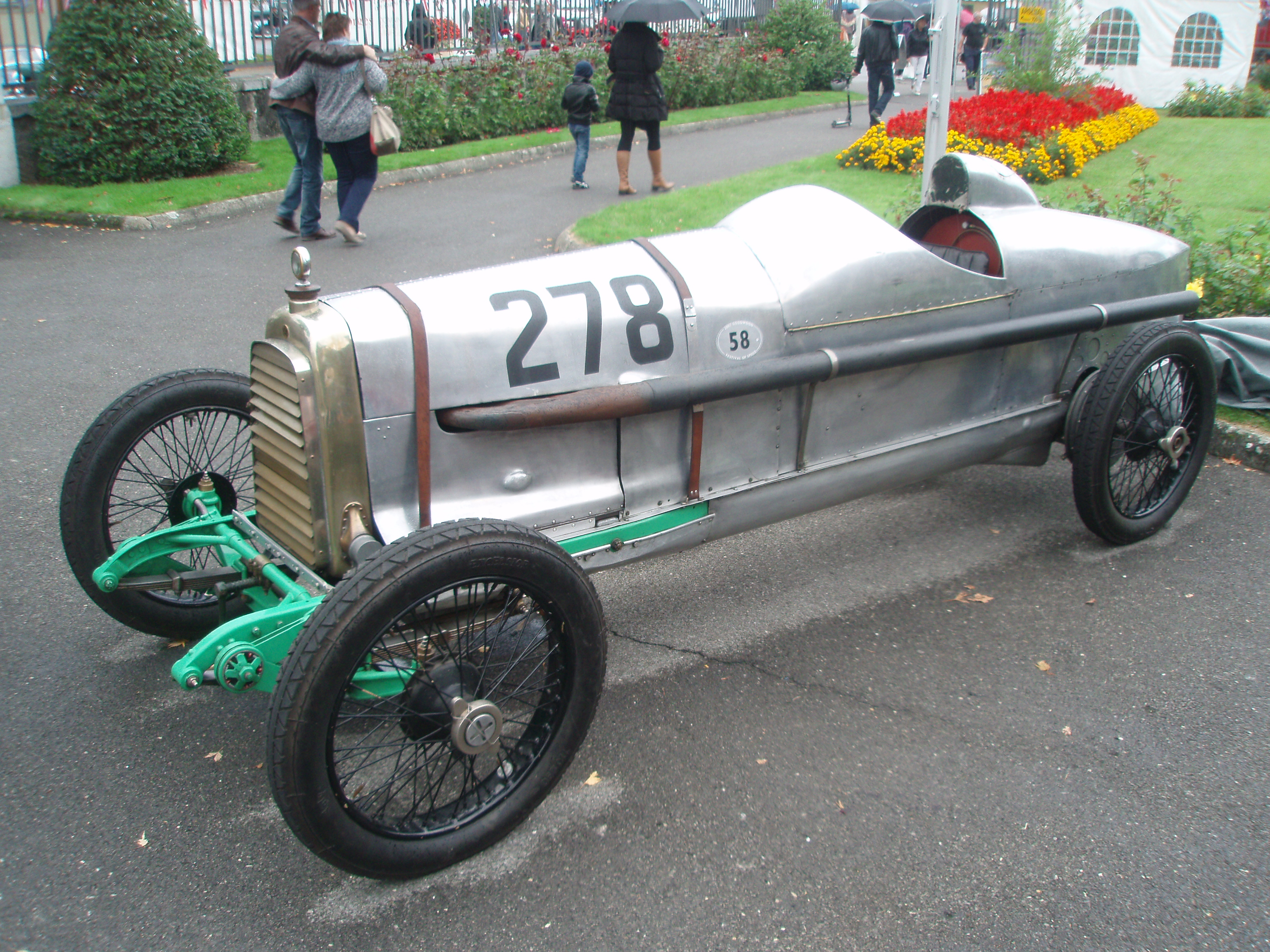
Left side

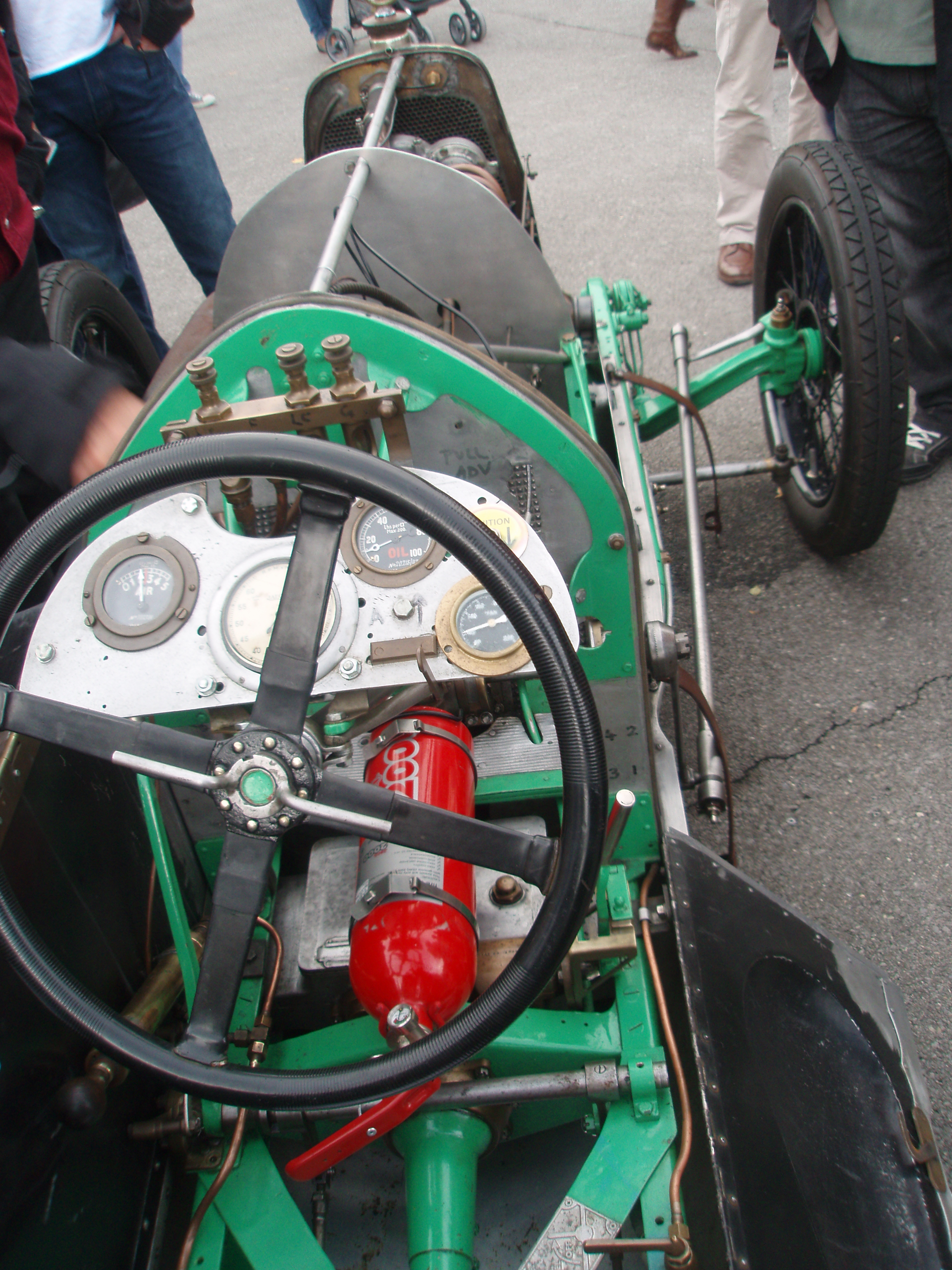
Cockpit (bonnet removed)

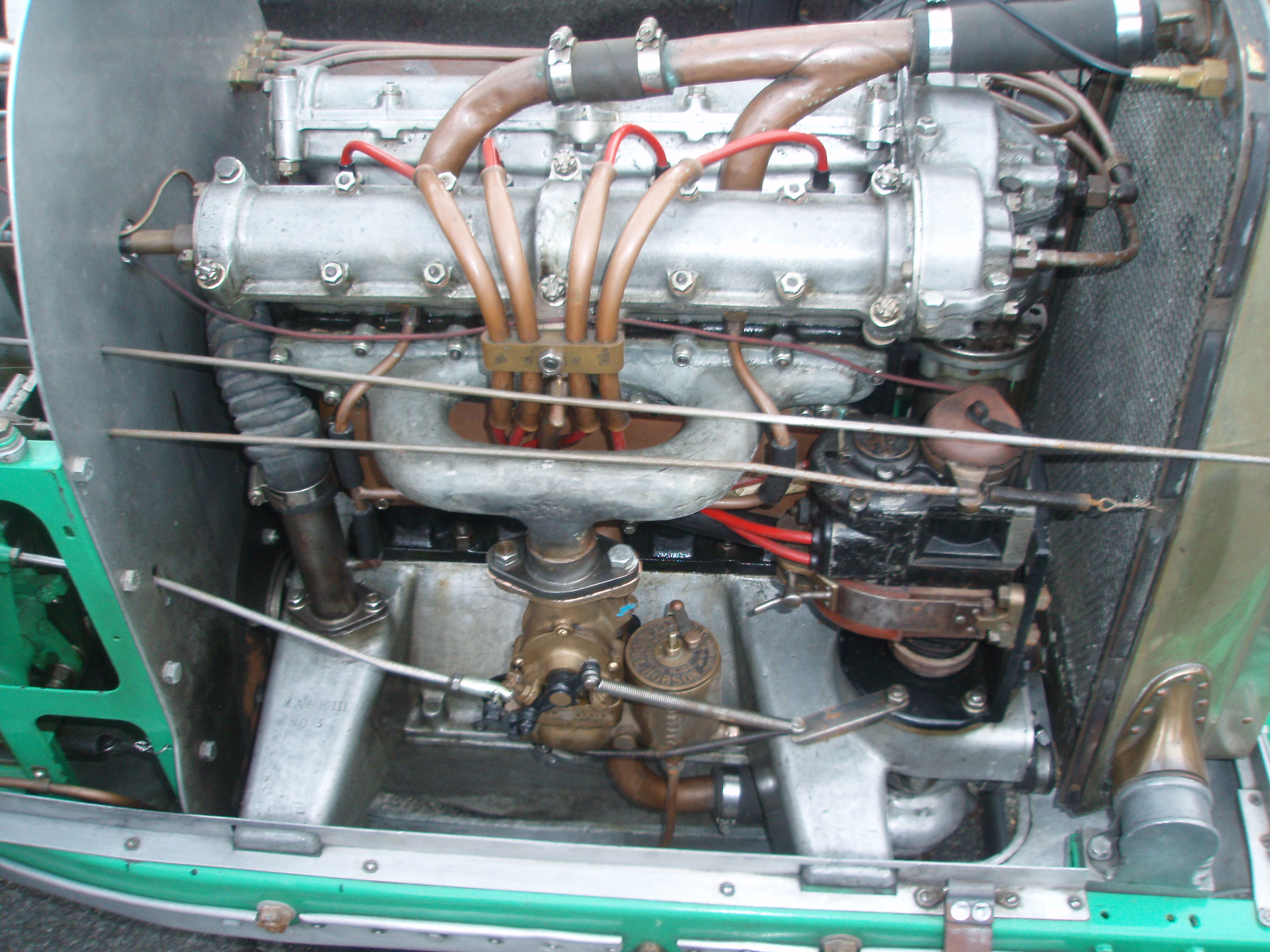
Engine

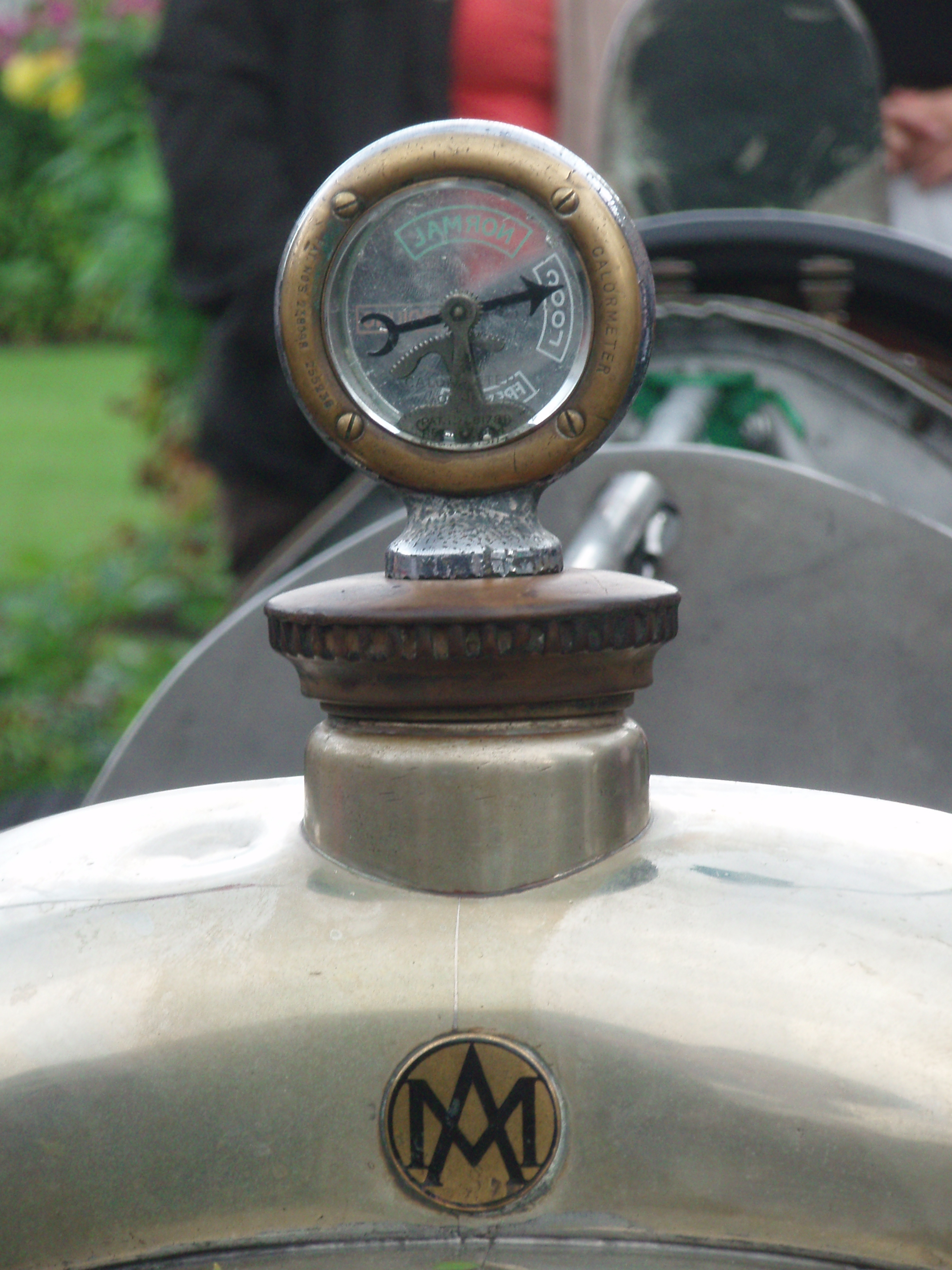
Radiator calormeter

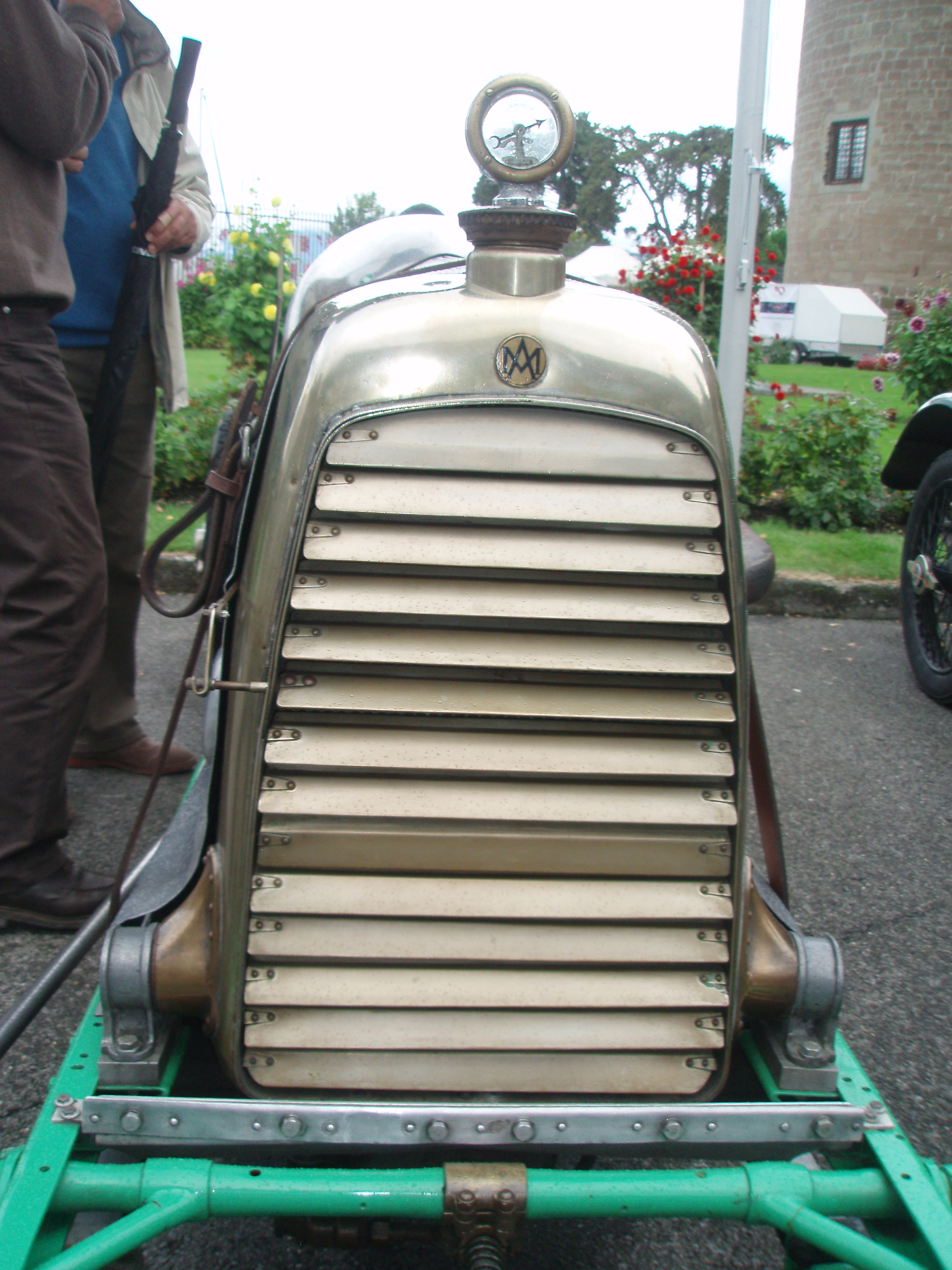
Radiator

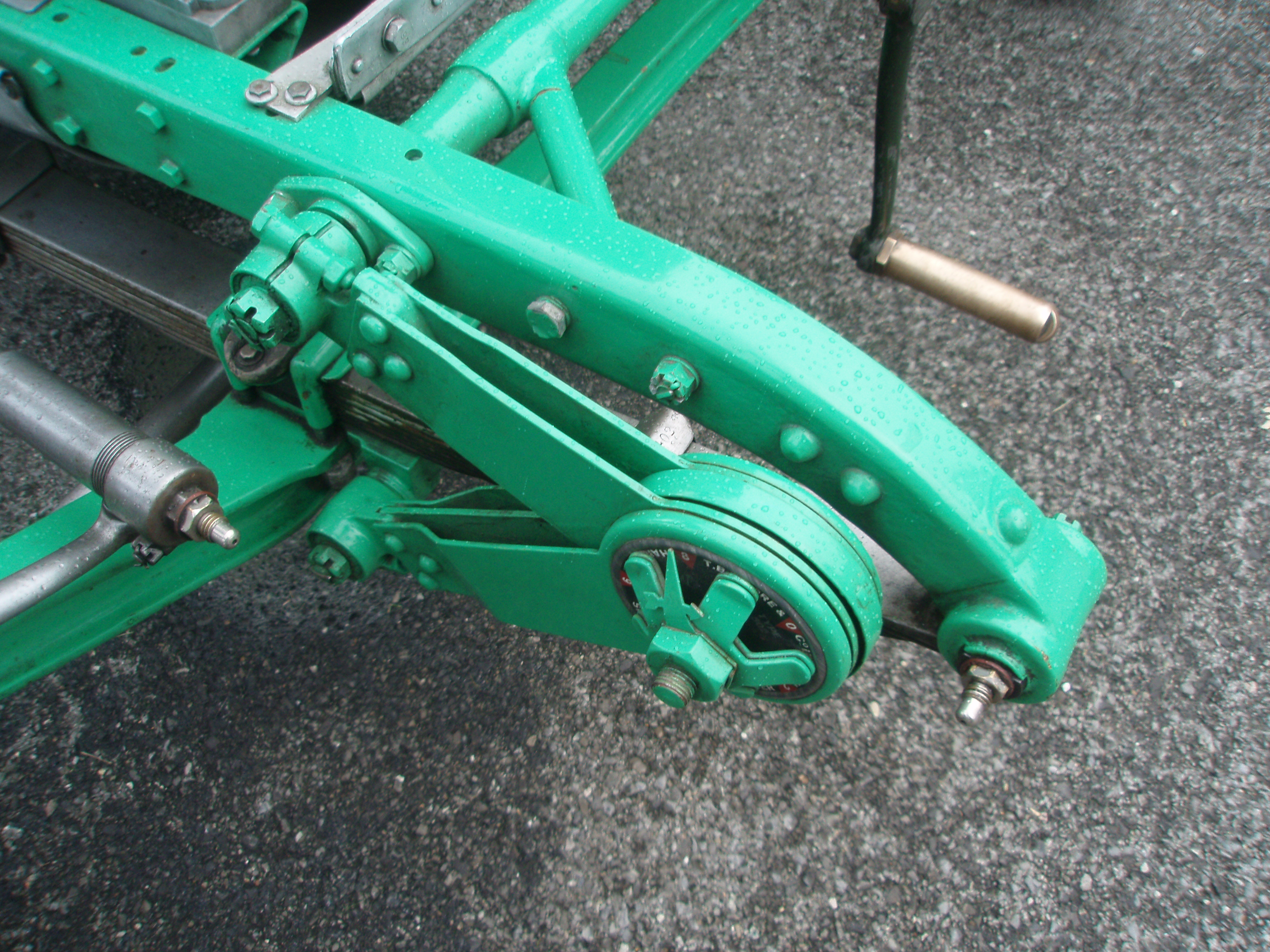
Front friction shock absorbers

== Racing history 1923 to 1935 ==
Year	Race	Result
1923	B.A.R.C. August Meeting Brooklands (Halford)	1st, 5th on handicap
	Southsea Speed Trials (Eyston)	2nd in class
	Record Attempt Brooklands (Halford)	S.S. km. 66.54 mph
	Record Attempt Brooklands (Moir)	S.S. Mile 74.12 mph
1924	M.A.C. Shelsley Walsh (Hall)	3rd in class
	Hants A.C. Hill Climb Spread Eagle (Cook), open events, 1600 c.c. and under	2nd on formula
	Hants A.C. Hill Climb Spread Eagle (Cook), open events, 3600 c.c. and under	2nd on formula
1925	Essex M.C. 100 Mile, Brooklands (Douglas)	2nd on handicap
	B.A.R.C. Whitsun Meeting Brooklands (Douglas)	1st overall
	B.A.R.C. August Meeting Brooklands (Douglas)	2nd overall
1932	Brighton Speed Trials (Milner)	
1933	Brighton Speed Trials (Wilmot)	
1935	V.S.C.C. Howard Park Speed Trials (Wintour)	
	B.O.C. Lewes Speed trials (Wintour)	Novice Award
