= Michael Shanly =

British multimillionaire businessman (born 1945)

- Born: Michael James Shanly; December 1945 (age 80); High Wycombe, England
- Occupation: Businessman
- Known for: Founder of Shanly Group

Michael James Shanly (born December 1945) is a British multimillionaire businessman. He founded the Shanly Group, a housebuilding and commercial property investment firm, where he currently serves as Chairman.

== Career ==
In 1969, Shanly founded Shanly Homes, a property company headquartered in Beaconsfield, Buckinghamshire. He also founded the commercial property business, Sorbon Estates, which has invested in market towns such as Amersham, Marlow, Maidenhead, Windsor, Berkhamsted and Weybridge. By the mid-1980s, Shanly Homes and Sorbon Estates had developed 2,000 homes and 40 commercial properties.

Shanly is a founding member of The Partnership for the Rejuvenation of Maidenhead (PRoM,) established in 2008 to regenerate the town centre of Maidenhead. As part of this, Shanly Homes redeveloped Chapel Arches, which provided 242 new homes across more than three acres and over 30,000sqft of commercial and retail space, linking with the Maidenhead Waterways project.

By 2019, Shanly Group had built over 12,000 homes and acquired a commercial property portfolio with over 1,300 tenants.

Overall, Shanly is the owner of nine companies and is the Chairman of Shanly Group.

== Philanthropy ==
Shanly Foundation was established in 1994. Since its launch, the foundation has contributed over £26m to local charities and community organizations.

Shanly Homes had a long-standing partnership with The Woodland Trust, donating over £350,000 and funding the planting of more than 20,000 trees, specifically in the Heartwood Forest, Hertfordshire. Shanly Homes has also partnered with Freshwater Habitats Trust and Plant Heritage.

In 2013, Daniela Shanly founded the Beech Lodge School, which provides a tailored alternative educational approach for children with social and emotional learning difficulties. Originally set in a converted barn, the school opened with five pupils, including Shanly’s son; Beech Lodge School now educates over ninety pupils.

In 2015, Shanly was ranked 122nd in Charities Aid Foundation's Top 200 Donors.

In 2016, the foundation donated £100,000 to the Alexander Devine Children’s Hospice Service to help finish construction on the site in White Waltham.

Shanly is a former Scout and has donated to local scout groups throughout the years. In 2017, Shanly Foundation teamed up with The Scout Association to launch a Building Futures competition to improve meeting places for Scout Groups. Offering 12 prizes ranging from £5,000-£100,000 this was the Foundation's biggest donation to date. The Woodhouse Eaves Scout Group in Loughborough was announced as the main winner and was awarded £100,000 to build a new Scout hut.

In 2019, Shanly Foundation made a £400,000 donation to Thames Hospice Care, funding the therapy room at its new facility in Maidenhead.

== Personal life ==
Shanly was born in December 1945 in High Wycombe; after a few months, his family moved to Eastcote, where Shanly spent his childhood. He lives in Berkshire.

According to the Sunday Times Rich List, Shanly was worth an estimated GBP£265 million in 2014. and GBP£320 million in 2015. In 2012, he was found guilty of tax evasion on his mother's inheritance via a Swiss bank account. He was fined GBP£469,444 for it. He was the only Briton to be "publicly identified" for failing to declare taxes on his Swiss bank account prior to Swiss Leaks. This money had already been donated to a children's charity in 2008.
