= Wendover Woods =

Woodland in Buckinghamshire, England

Coordinates: 51.77171°N 0.71154°W

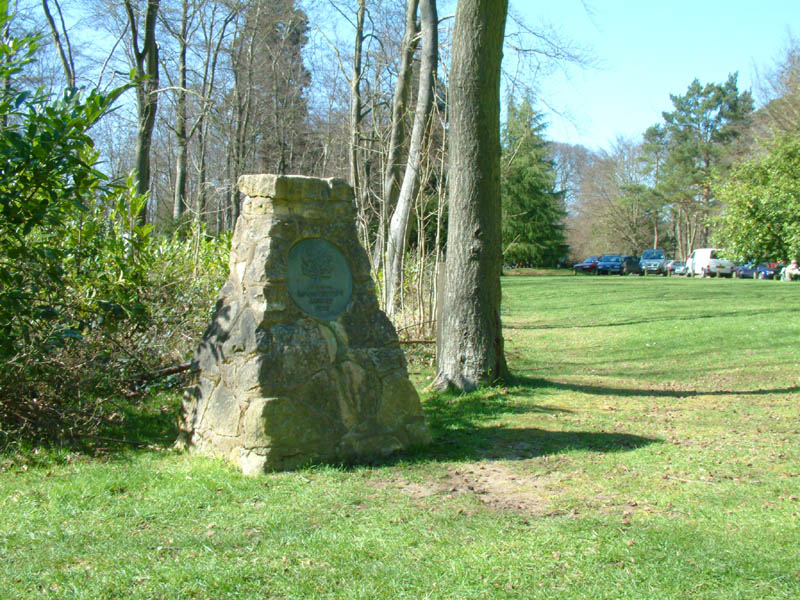
- Wendover Woods near the summit of Haddington Hill

Highest point
- Elevation: 160–267 m (525–876 ft)

Geography
- Location: Chiltern Hills, England
- OS grid: SP890089
- Topo map: OS Landranger 165

Wendover Woods is an area of woodland on the north edge of the Chiltern Hills in England. Named after the nearby town of Wendover, the woods are part of the Public Forest Estate and are managed by Forestry England.

Covering 325 ha (800 acres), the woods are a mixture of coniferous and broad-leaved trees. There are several signed walks for recreation, as well as bridleways, picnic and barbecue areas and a children's playground. A Go Ape treetop adventure course opened in 2008.

There are views of the countryside in the Aylesbury Vale to the north, and a stone monument marking the highest point of the Chilterns which lies within the woods on Haddington Hill.

The Aston Hill Mountain Bike Area is at the edge of the woods.
