= Motor Cycling Club =

British motorsports club

- Formation: 1901
- Location: United Kingdom

2009 Exeter Trial

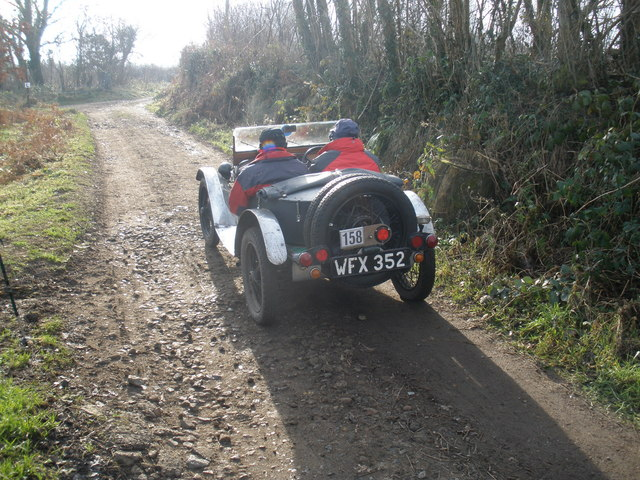
Reaching the summit of the Charles Wood section of the 'Exeter Trial'

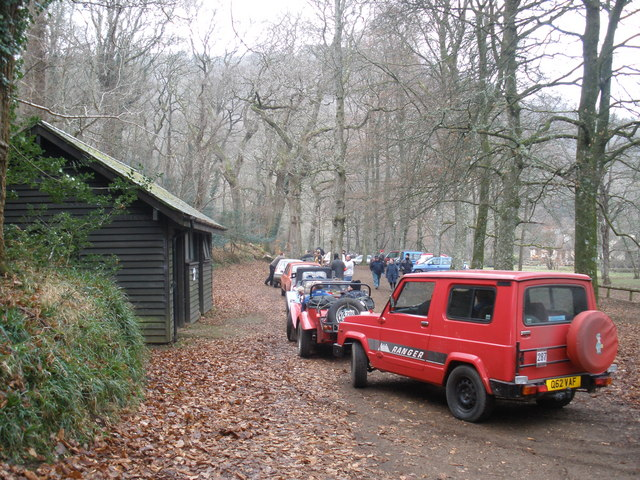
Vehicles at Fingle Bridge line up for the steep hill-climb through Charles Wood

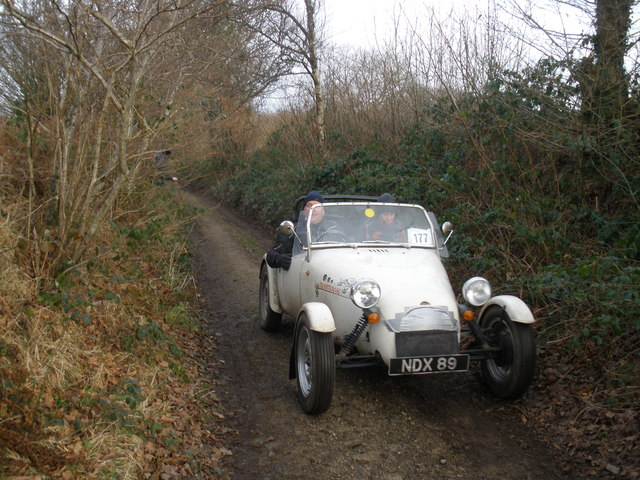
Completing a hill climb during the annual 'Exeter Trial'

The Motor Cycling Club (MCC) is a British motorsports and motorcycle sport club formed in 1901. It is the second oldest motorcycle club in Great Britain. It is a member of both the Motor Sports Association (cars) and Auto-Cycle Union (bikes). It organises the following Motorcycle trials and Car trials competitions:

- The Lands End Trial
- The Edinburgh Trial
- The Exeter Trial
- The MCC Speed Trials

In 1906 The Motor Cycling Club's gold medal was awarded to those who could compete the 391 mile journey from London to Edinburgh inside 24 hours. The fastest finisher was Tom Woodman (22h 38m) riding a Vindec Special motor-bicycle. Muriel Hind completed the trial in 22h 52m driving a 9 hp Singer Tricar with a female passenger. Since the MCC members use 2, 3 and 4 wheeled vehicles current regulations prevent mixed competition events on race tracks citing safety considerations so the MCC Speed trials have been suspended, The classic Trials however continue to be one of the few events where motorcycles three wheelers and cars compete together.
