= Aston Hill Mountain Bike Area =

Bike Park in Buckinghamshire

Coordinates: 51.78205°N 0.71613°W

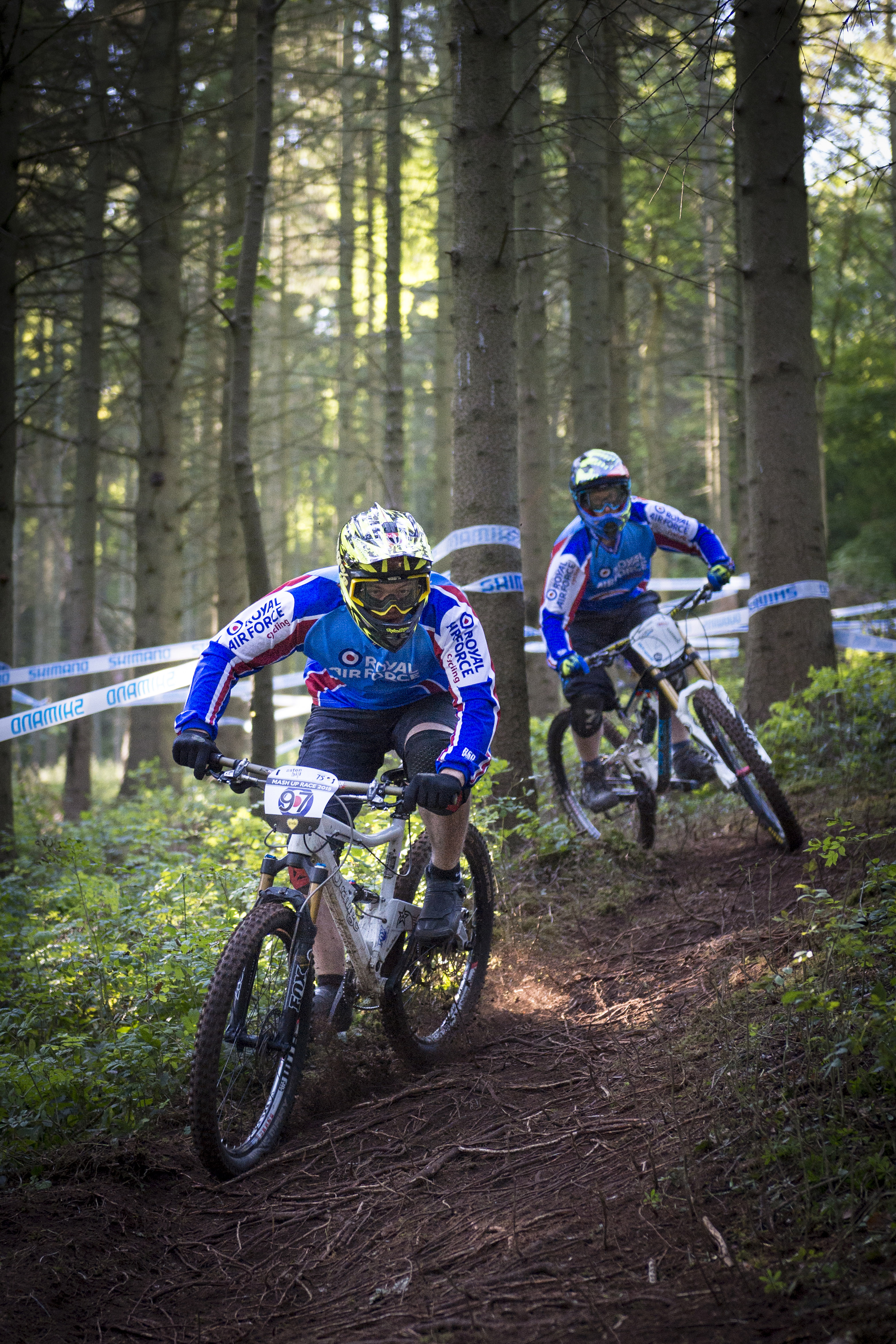
RAF Downhill Championships, Aston Hill 'Mash Up' downhill race, 2015

Aston Hill Bike Park is located adjacent to Wendover Woods on the ridge of the Chiltern Hills, above Aston Clinton, Buckinghamshire, England.

It is managed by Forestry England and the Community Interest Company (CIC) Chiltern Hills Bike park.

Aston Hill is a challenging venue, better suited to intermediate and expert riders when dry and more experienced riders when wet. There are downhill (DH) cross country (XC) and four-cross (4X) mountain bike trails. The downhill trails are the Red Run (which is part of the XC loop) the Black Run, Ricochet, Root Canal, and Surface to Air freeride trail.

Aston Hill hosts various events throughout the year, like the "Firecrest MTB Adult Rider Development Programme".

As of February 2024 the bike park is temporarily closed after a number of trees were affected by Ash dieback.

== Aston Martin ==
The Aston Martin plaque is to the left of the car park.
