= Classic trial =

Form of off-road motor sports

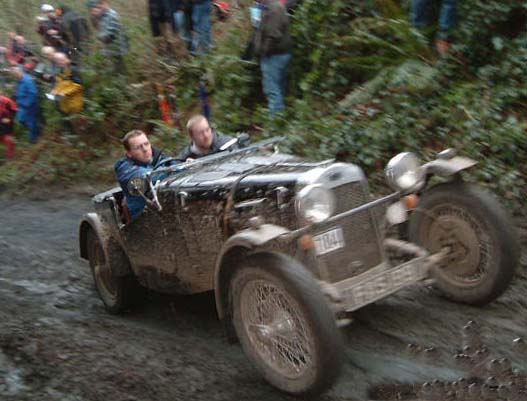
1954 HRG Volvo on the MCC Exeter 2004 Trial.

Classic trials, or colloquially mud plugging, is one of the oldest forms of rallying or off-road motor sports, dating from the beginning of the 20th century. Originally, the challenge was just to complete a long (challenging) road course. All three Motor Cycling Club long distance trials in the UK – the Land's End, the Exeter and the Edinburgh – date from that time, and are still held today.

As vehicles became more reliable, the events became easier and the concept of observed non-stop sections was introduced. On these, the car or motorcycle is stopped at the foot of a hill and has to make a non-stop ascent.

On a classic trial today, there will typically be around fifteen of such "observed sections", mixed with between 40 and 400 miles of road course.

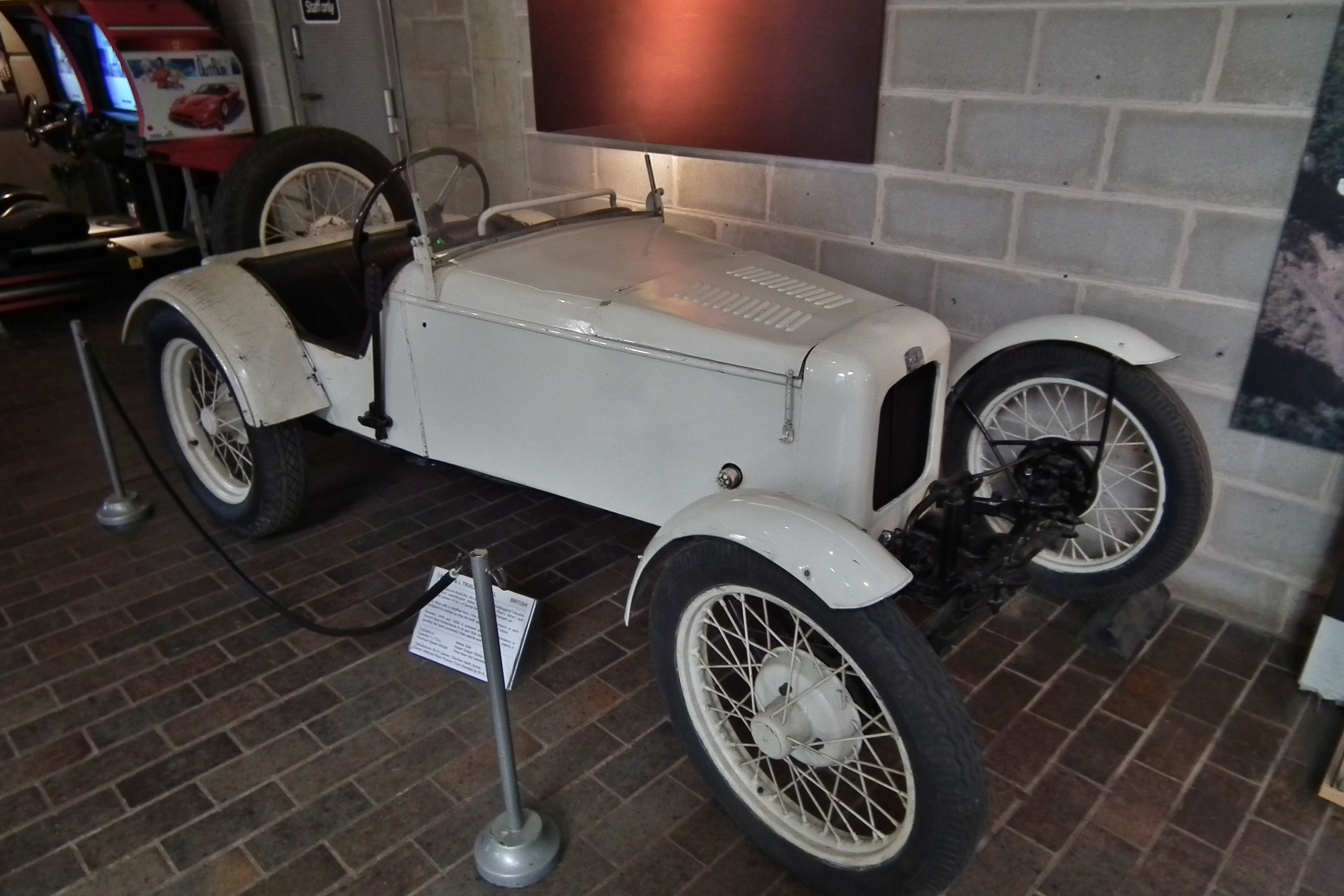
1954 M & L Trials Special — a successful one-off vehicle, now in museum

Specific forms of car trials are PCTs (production car trials), for (road legal) production cars with minimal modification, and on the other hand sporting trials for special "flyweight" vehicles. These trials are restricted to one off-road trial route, without any road mileage sections.
