= Geology of Oxfordshire =

Geology of English county

Geological map of Oxfordshire and Berkshire, 1913

Geological map centred on Oxford

The English county of Oxfordshire is formed of a series of Jurassic and Cretaceous strata. The variety of the county's landscapes, including chalk downs, Cotswold valleys, and ironstone hills, derives from the underlying geology. In the distant past, Oxfordshire has been a coral sea, frozen waste, hot desert, shallow lagoon, and tropical rain forest. The underlying rocks in Oxfordshire are sedimentary, mainly deposited in shallow seas. They range in age from the Jurassic period, around 200 million years ago, through the Cretaceous period, and then much later, the Ice Ages. There are four main types of rock in Oxfordshire: chalk, clays, limestones, and sands.

== Detailed geology ==
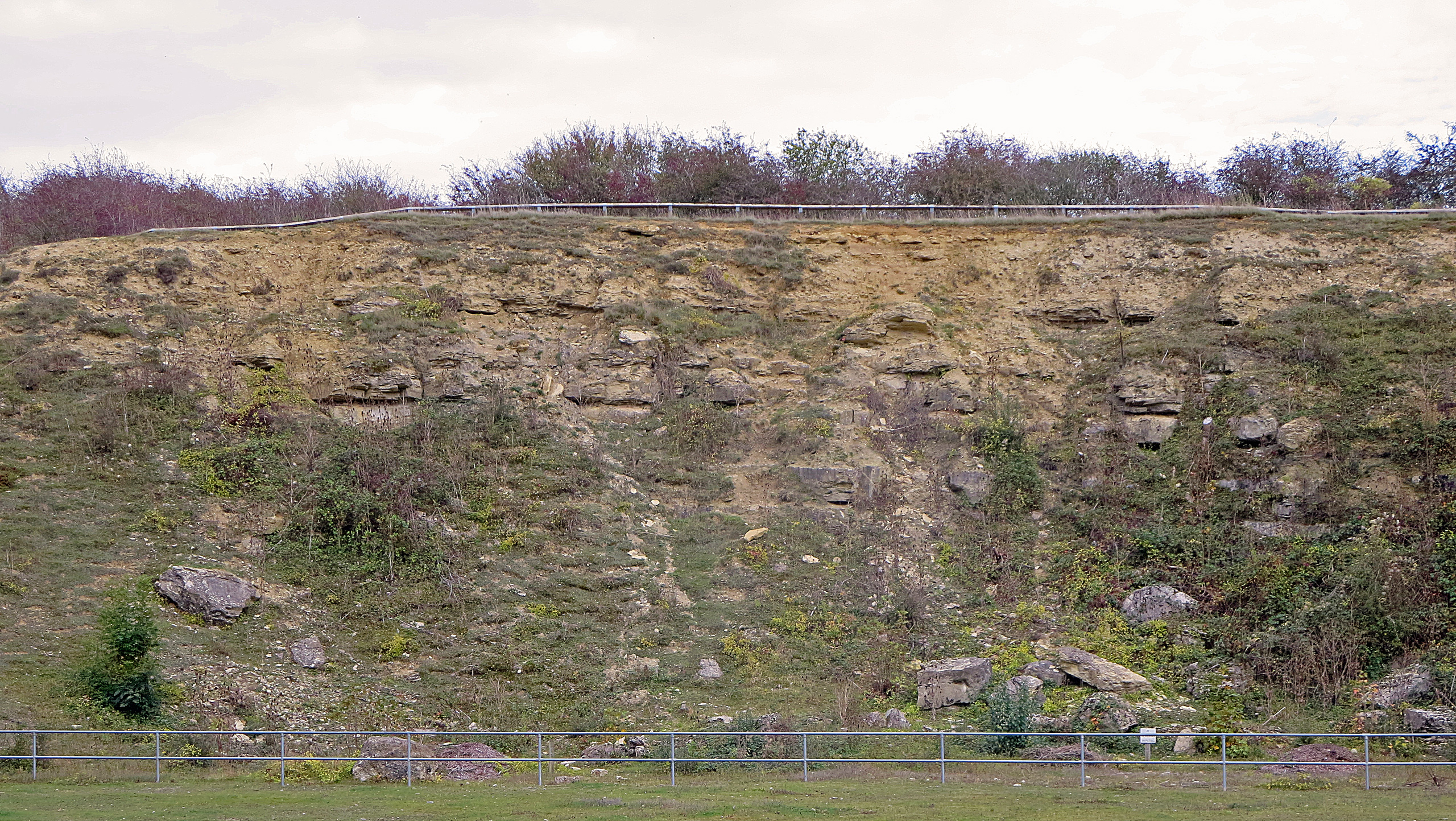
The east face of Kirtlington Quarry, an important Middle Jurassic vertebrate location

The lowest geological beds, those of the Lower Lias, appear in the upper parts of the valleys of the River Cherwell above the town of Banbury, and of the River Evenlode above the village of Charlbury. Shelly limestone beds have historically been polished for marble at Banbury. The Middle Lias layer, with the marlstone, is well developed near Banbury, and the rock bed has been extensively quarried as a building stone at Hornton near Edge Hill, where it occurs as a brown and green ferruginous (iron-bearing) limestone. At King's Sutton and Adderbury, it is an iron ore that has been largely worked, and the same is the case at Fawler, near Charlbury. The soil is a rich brown friable loam. Next is the stiff blue Upper Lias clay, which borders the Oolites and occurs in the River Windrush valley above Burford. A boring made a little south of Burford was made through the Lias and New Red Sandstone rocks to the coal levels, which were reached at a depth of 1,184 feet.

The Oolites form the uplands, which extend from Burford to Woodstock, Chipping Norton, and Bicester. The Inferior Oolite series, including Chipping Norton Limestone, is found in some of the outlying hills and scarps to the northwest, but it is far thinner and less important than in the Cotswold Hills. It contains sands and limestones, with examples of Trigonia and other fossils. The Great Oolite series extends over much of the Oolitic uplands, as a white limestone with marls, and with underlying freestone at Taynton and Milton-under-Wychwood near Burford. The white limestones contain corals and other fossils. Above comes the Forest Marble Formation, so named from Wychwood Forest northeast of Burford, where layers of shelly limestone were historically polished for mantelpieces. Near Kirtlington, remains of a huge Cetiosaurus dinosaur have been found.

Locally around the village of Stonesfield, the lowest beds of the Great Oolite consist of "flaggy" (naturally splitting into thin, flat layers or slabs) oolitic and sandy limestone, mined for stone tiles, and known as Stonesfield Slate. These beds have yielded remains of mammals, reptiles, fishes, molluscs, plants, etc. The neighbourhood of Stonesfield is riddled with shafts. The Cornbrash which overlies the Forest Marble is fossiliferous and is exposed at Witney, Kidlington, Bicester, etc., and in faulted tracts at Islip, etc. The Oxford Clay forms a belt of low-lying ground along the borders of the River Thames from Lechlade to Bampton and the city of Oxford, and to the northeast of the city, around Otmoor. Historically, there have been large brickyards near Oxford, where many ammonites and other fossils have been found. The Corallian beds overlie the Oxford Clay and have been quarried for (poor-quality) stone at Headington and Wheatley. Kimmeridge Clay follows and can be seen at the base of Shotover Hill. Here Portland beds lie above, and are covered by Shotover sands. Other tracts contain Portland and Purbeck beds, for example at Garsington and Great Haseley; and Portland beds occur at Thame.

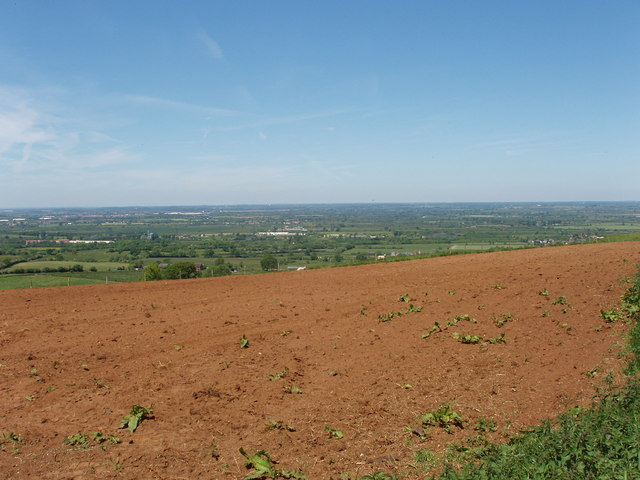
Shotover iron sand field

The Shotover sands (Wealden) consist of sands with beds of ochre, Fuller's Earth, and ironstone, including embedded freshwater molluscs. Lower Greensand can be seen at Culham and Gault occurs there and in the vale, which extends to Tetsworth. The Upper Greensand outcrops are in a minor scarp along the foot of the Chiltern Hills. These Chalk hills form an escarpment, extending from Goring and Whitchurch towards Stokenchurch, with, on their flanks, an occasional outlier of the Reading Formation and London Clay, as at Nettlebed, and on the lower part of the dipping slope, as near Caversham and other locations. Along this slope to the town of Henley-on-Thames, tracts of clay with flints, brickearth, and gravel are scattered over the Chalk surface. Valley gravels border the River Thames from Bampton to Oxford and lower down along its course.

Oxfordshire contains little glacial drift except in the northeast part on the borders with the neighbouring county of Buckinghamshire.

== Strata of the Oxford area ==
The following strata are to be found in the Oxford area:

Eocene

- London Clay
- Reading Formation

Late Cretaceous

- Chalk Group
  - Upper
    - Chalk with flints
    - Nodular Chalk
    - Chalk Rock
  - Middle
    - White nodular Chalk
    - Melbourn Rock
    - White Chalk
  - Lower
    - Totternhoe Stone
    - Chalk Marl and Chloritic Marl
- Upper Greensand
  - Malmstone
- Gault Formation

Early Cretaceous

- Lower Greensand
- Wealden Group
  - Shotover Ironsands

Late Jurassic

- Purbeck Group
- Portland Group
- Kimmeridgian
  - Hartwell Clay and Swindon Clay
  - Shotover Grit Sands
  - Kimmeridge Clay
- Corallian
  - Ampthill Clay (to the east)
  - Coral Rag Formation and Wheatley Limestone
  - Lower Calcareous Grit
- Oxford Clay
- Kellaways Formation

Middle Jurassic

- Cornbrash
- Great Oolite
  - Forest Marble Formation
  - White Limestone
  - Hampen Formation
  - Taynton Limestone Formation
  - Stonesfield Slate Beds
  - Sharp's Hill Formation
  - Chipping Norton Limestone
  - Hook Norton Limestone
- Inferior Oolite
  - Clypeus Grit
  - Leckhampton Limestone

Early Jurassic

- Lias Group
  - Upper Lias
  - Middle Lias
    - Marlstone Rock Formation
    - Micaceous Clay and sandy clay
  - Lower Lias

== See also ==
- Geology of Berkshire
- Oxfordian age
- Quarries in Oxfordshire
- William Joscelyn Arkell

1871 geological map centred around Oxford and the River Thames.

== Bibliography ==
- Arkell, W.J. (1947). Oxford Stone. Faber & Faber.
- Martin, A.F.; Steel, R.W., eds. (1954). "2. Geology and Physiography". The Oxford Region: A Scientific and Historical Survey. London: Oxford University Press. pp. 7–36.
- Philips, John (1871). Geology of Oxford and the Valley of the Thames. Oxford: Clarendon Press.
- Pocock, Theodore Innes; Pringle, John (1926). The Geology of the Country Around Oxford. H.M. Stationery Office.
- Woodward, H.B., ed. (1913). Stanford's Geological Atlas of Great Britain and Ireland (4th ed.). London: Edward Stanford.
