= List of fossiliferous stratigraphic units in England =

Group or Formation	Period	Notes
Alston Group / Knipe Scar Limestone	Carboniferous	
Alston Group / Potts Beck Limestone	Carboniferous	
Ampthill Clay	Jurassic	
Ancholme Group / Kimmeridge Clay	Jurassic	
Ancholme Group / Oxford Clay	Jurassic	
Ashfell Limestone	Carboniferous	
Aymestry Limestone Formation	Silurian	
Baggy Sandstones Formation	Devonian	
Bala Group / Chatwell Flags Formation	Ordovician	
Barton Formation	Palaeogene	
Barton Beds	Palaeogene	
Barton Clay	Palaeogene	
Bee Low Limestones	Carboniferous	
Belemnite Marls	Jurassic	
Bembridge Limestone	Palaeogene	
Bembridge Marls	Palaeogene	
Bentham Grit	Carboniferous	
Berkshire Oolite Formation	Jurassic	
Black Rock Formation	Carboniferous	
Blackdown Greensand Formation	Cretaceous	
Blackheath Beds	Palaeogene	
Blue Lias Formation	Jurassic	
Bracklesham Formation	Palaeogene	
Bracklesham Beds	Palaeogene	
Bracklesham Group / Earnley Formation	Palaeogene	
Bracklesham Group / Elmore Formation	Palaeogene	
Bracklesham Group / Marsh Farm Formation	Palaeogene	
Bracklesham Group / Selsey Formation	Palaeogene	
Bracklesham Group / Wittering Formation	Palaeogene	
Bringewood Beds	Silurian	
Brockenhurst Beds	Palaeogene	
Bromsgrove Sandstone	Triassic	
Burwell Rock Formation	Cretaceous	
Calcareous Grit	Jurassic	
Carboniferous Limestone	Carboniferous	
Carmarthen Formation	Ordovician	
Carstone Formation	Cretaceous	
Caton Shales	Carboniferous	
Cauldon Low Conglomerate Formation	Carboniferous	
Cauldon Low Limestone	Carboniferous	
Cementstone Formation	Carboniferous	
Chalk Formation	Cretaceous	
Chalk Marl Formation	Cretaceous	
Chalk Group / "Upper Chalk" Formation	Cretaceous	
Chalk Group / Lower Chalk Formation	Cretaceous	
Chalk Group / Lower Formation	Cretaceous	
Charmouth Mudstone Formation	Jurassic	
Chee Tor Limestone	Carboniferous	
Cheney Longville Formation	Ordovician	
Chillesford Clay	Quaternary	
Claxby Ironstone Formation	Cretaceous	
Clifton Down Limestone	Carboniferous	
Cockhill Marine Band	Carboniferous	
Colsterdale Marine Beds	Carboniferous	
Coral Rag Formation	Jurassic	
Corallian Oolite Formation	Jurassic	
Corallian Group / Coral Rag Formation	Jurassic	
Corallian Group / Kingston Formation	Jurassic	
Coralline Crag Formation	Neogene	
Coralline Oolite Formation	Jurassic	
Cornbrash Formation	Jurassic	
Cotswold Slate Formation	Jurassic	
Crag Group / Norwich Crag Formation	Quaternary	
Crag Group / Weybourne Crag Formation		
Creechbarrow Limestone	Palaeogene	
Cromer Forest Bed Formation		
Cromer Knoll Formation		
Cromer Knoll Group / Spilsby Sandstone	Cretaceous	
Crossdale Shales	Carboniferous	
Crugan Mudstone Formation	Ordovician	
Dartmouth Beds	Devonian	
Denbury Crinoidal Limestone	Devonian	
Dent Group / Keisley Limestone	Ordovician	
Ditton Formation	Devonian	
Downton Castle Sandstone	Silurian	
Downton Sandstone	Silurian	
Downton Group / Downton Castle Sandstone	Silurian	
Downton Group / Rushall Formation	Silurian	
Dufton Shales	Ordovician	
Durlston Formation	Cretaceous	
Duyfor Mudstone	Ordovician	
East Ogwell Limestone	Devonian	
Eggardon Grit	Cretaceous	
Elton Beds	Silurian	
Eyam Limestone	Carboniferous	
Eyam Limestones Formation	Carboniferous	
Farne Group / Scremerston Formation	Carboniferous	
Forest Bed Formation		
Forest Hollow Beds	Carboniferous	
Forest Marble Formation	Jurassic	
Frome Clay	Jurassic	
Fuller's Earth Formation	Jurassic	
Gault Formation	Cretaceous	
Glauconitic Marl Formation	Cretaceous	
Great Oolite Formation	Jurassic	
Great Oolite Group / Bath Oolite Formation	Jurassic	
Great Oolite Group / Chipping Norton Limestone	Jurassic	
Great Oolite Group / Cornbrash Formation	Jurassic	
Great Oolite Group / Forest Marble Formation	Jurassic	
Great Oolite Group / Hampen Marly Formation	Jurassic	
Great Oolite Group / Sharp's Hill Formation	Jurassic	
Great Oolite Group / Taynton Limestone	Jurassic	
Great Oolite Group / White Limestone	Jurassic	
Great Scar Limestone Group / Ashfell Formation	Carboniferous	
Great Scar Limestone Group / Danny Bridge Formation	Carboniferous	
Greta Grit	Carboniferous	
Habberley Shale	Ordovician	
Hambleton Oolite Formation	Jurassic	
Hampen Marly Formation	Jurassic	
Hartshill Formation	Cambrian	
Harwich Formation	Palaeogene	
Hastings Formation	Cretaceous	
Hastings Beds	Cretaceous	
Hastings Beds Group / Wadhurst Clay	Cretaceous	
Hastings Group / Grinstead Clay	Cretaceous	
Headon Formation	Palaeogene	
Headon Hill Formation	Palaeogene	
Hempstead Formation	Palaeogene	
Hilton Plant Beds	Permian	
Holderness Formation		
Hope Shale	Ordovician	
Hopedale Limestones Formation	Carboniferous	
Hotwells Formation	Carboniferous	
Inferior Oolite Formation	Jurassic	
Inferior Oolite Group / Chipping Norton Limestone	Jurassic	
Inferior Oolite Group / Middle Inferior Oolite Formation	Jurassic	
Inferior Oolite Group / Northampton Sands	Jurassic	
Inferior Oolite Group / Upper Inferior Oolite Formation	Jurassic	
Infracombe Slates Group / Combe Martin Slates Formation	Devonian	
Insect Bed Formation	Triassic	
Iron Sands	Jurassic	
Junction Bed Formation	Jurassic	
Keisley Formation	Ordovician	
Kimmeridge Clay	Jurassic	
Kimmeridge Formation	Jurassic	
Kirkby Moor Flags Formation	Silurian	
Ledbury Formation	Silurian	
Leintwardine Formation	Silurian	
Leintwardine Beds	Silurian	
Lias Formation	Jurassic, Triassic	
Lias Group / Beacon Limestone Formation	Jurassic	
Lias Group / Blue Lias Formation	Jurassic, Triassic	
Lias Group / Charmouth Mudstone Formation	Jurassic	
Lias Group / Dyrham Formation	Jurassic	
Lias Group / Marlstone Rock Formation	Jurassic	
Lias Group / Scunthorpe Mudstone Formation	Triassic	
Lias Group / Whitby Mudstone Formation	Jurassic	
Lincolnshire Limestone	Jurassic	
Llanfallteg Formation	Ordovician	
London Clay	Palaeogene	
Lower Borland Shales	Carboniferous	
Lower Calcareous Grit	Jurassic	
Lower Chalk Formation	Cretaceous	
Lower Chalk Group / Abbott's Cliff Formation	Cretaceous	
Lower Chalk Group / Cambridge Greensand Formation	Cretaceous	
Lower Chalk Group / Chalk Marl Formation	Cretaceous	
Lower Comley Formation	Cambrian	
Lower Ditton Formation	Devonian	
Lower Greensand Formation	Cretaceous	
Lower Greensand Group / Atherfield Clay	Cretaceous	
Lower Greensand Group / Faringdon Sand Formation	Cretaceous	
Lower Greensand Group / Ferruginous Sands	Cretaceous	
Lower Greensand Group / Folkestone Formation	Cretaceous	
Lower Greensand Group / Hythe Formation	Cretaceous	
Lower Greensand Group / Sandgate Formation	Cretaceous	
Lower Greensand Group / Woburn Sand Formation	Cretaceous	
Lower Hamstead Beds	Palaeogene	
Lower Headon Beds	Palaeogene	
Lower Limestone Group / Great Scar Limestone	Carboniferous	
Lower Marl Formation	Permian	
Ludlow Formation	Silurian	
Lulworth Formation	Cretaceous	
Lynton Slates Formation	Devonian	
Magnesian Conglomerate Formation	Triassic	
Malton Oolite Formation	Jurassic	
Mammaliferous Crag Formation		
Marl Slate Formation	Permian	
Mercia Mudstone Group / Blue Anchor Formation	Triassic	
Mercia Mudstone Group / Keuper Waterstones Formation	Triassic	
Mercia Mudstone Group / Tarporley Siltstone Formation	Triassic	
Merevale Shales	Ordovician	
Middle Calcareous Grit	Jurassic	
Middle Chalk Formation	Cretaceous	
Middle Headon Beds	Palaeogene	
Middle Inferior Oolite Formation	Jurassic	
Middle Limestone Group / Five Yard Limestone VI Formation	Carboniferous	
Middle Limestone Group / Five Yard Limestone VI Cyclothem Formation	Carboniferous	
Middle Limestone Group / Five Yard Limestone VIa Formation	Carboniferous	
Middle Limestone Group / Five Yard Limestone VIa Cyclothem Formation	Carboniferous	
Middle Limestone Group / Five Yard Limestone VIb Formation	Carboniferous	
Middle Limestone Group / Gayle Limestone Cyclothem Formation	Carboniferous	
Middle Limestone Group / Gayle Limestone II Formation	Carboniferous	
Middle Limestone Group / Gayle Shale	Carboniferous	
Middle Limestone Group / Hardrow Scar Limestone III Formation	Carboniferous	
Middle Limestone Group / Hardrow Scar Limestone III Cyclothem Formation	Carboniferous	
Middle Limestone Group / Hardrow Scar Limestone IIIa Formation	Carboniferous	
Middle Limestone Group / Hardrow Scar Limestone IIIb Formation	Carboniferous	
Middle Limestone Group / Hardrow Scar Limestone IIIc Formation	Carboniferous	
Middle Limestone Group / Hawes Limestone I Formation	Carboniferous	
Middle Limestone Group / Middle Limestone V Formation	Carboniferous	
Middle Limestone Group / Middle Limestone V Cyclothem Formation	Carboniferous	
Middle Limestone Group / Middle Limestone Va Formation	Carboniferous	
Middle Limestone Group / Middle Limestone Va Cyclothem Formation	Carboniferous	
Middle Limestone Group / Simonstone Limestone IV Formation	Carboniferous	
Middle Limestone Group / Simonstone Limestone IV Cyclothem Formation	Carboniferous	
Middle Limestone Group / Simonstone Limestone IVa Formation	Carboniferous	
Middle Limestone Group / Simonstone Limestone IVa Cyclothem Formation	Carboniferous	
Middle Limestone Group / Simonstone Limestone IVb Formation	Carboniferous	
Middle Limestone Group / Simonstone Limestone IVb Cyclothem Formation	Carboniferous	
Middle Limestone Group / Simonstone Limestone IVc Formation	Carboniferous	
Middle Limestone Group / Simonstone Limestone IVc Cyclothem Formation	Carboniferous	
Middle Limestone Group / Three Yard Limestone VII Formation	Carboniferous	
Middle Limestone Group / Three Yard Limestone VII Cyclothem Formation	Carboniferous	
Middle Limestone Group / Underset Limestone VIII Formation	Carboniferous	
Milldale Limestone	Carboniferous	
Monsal Dale Limestones Formation	Carboniferous	
Much Wenlock Formation	Silurian	
Mytton Flag Formation	Ordovician	
Mytton Flags and Tankerville Formation	Ordovician	
Namurian Series Formation	Carboniferous	
Norwich Crag Formation	Quaternary	
Nothe Grits Formation	Jurassic	
Ogof Hen Formation	Ordovician	
Oldhaven Formation	Palaeogene	
Oldhaven Beds	Palaeogene	
Osborne Beds	Palaeogene	
Osgodby Formation	Jurassic	
Osmington Oolite Formation	Jurassic	
Overton Formation	Silurian	
Oxford Clay	Jurassic	
Parrot Coal Formation	Carboniferous	
Passage Beds	Jurassic	
Penarth Group / Lilstock Formation	Triassic	
Penarth Group / Westbury Formation	Triassic	
Penarth Group / White Lias Formation	Jurassic, Triassic	
Pendle Grit	Carboniferous	
Penarth Group / Cotham Formation	Triassic	
Penarth Group / Westbury Formation	Triassic	
Petherwin Group / Baggy Formation	Devonian	
Pilton Formation	Devonian	
Pilton Shales	Carboniferous, Devonian	
Pontyfenni Formation	Ordovician	
Portland Formation	Jurassic	
Portland Oolite Formation	Jurassic	
Portland Group / Portland Stone Formation	Jurassic	
Purbeck Formation	Cretaceous, Jurassic	
Purbeck Group / Durlston Formation	Cretaceous	
Purbeck Group / Lulworth Formation	Cretaceous, Jurassic	
Ravenscar Formation	Jurassic	
Ravenscar Group / Cloughton Formation	Jurassic	
Ravenscar Group / Eller Beck Formation	Jurassic	
Ravenscar Group / Lower Saltwick Formation	Jurassic	
Ravenscar Group / Saltwick Formation	Jurassic	
Ravenscar Group / Scalby Formation	Jurassic	
Ravenscar Group / Scarborough Formation	Jurassic	
Reading Beds	Palaeogene	
Red Crag Formation	Neogene	
Ringstead Coral Bed Formation	Jurassic	
Roeburndale Formation	Carboniferous	
Rutland Formation	Jurassic	
Sabden Shale	Carboniferous	
Saltwick Formation	Jurassic	
Sandringham Sands	Jurassic	
Sandringham Sandstone	Cretaceous	
Sandsfoot Grit	Jurassic	
Selborne Group / Gault Formation	Cretaceous	
Selborne Group / Upper Greensand Formation	Cretaceous	
Selsey Formation	Palaeogene	
Sharp's Hill Formation	Jurassic	
Sherwood Sandstone Group / Bromsgrove Sandstone	Triassic	
Sherwood Sandstone Group / Otter Sandstone Formation	Triassic	
Shunner Fell Formation	Carboniferous	
Skegness Clay	Cretaceous	
Solenopora Beds	Carboniferous	
Solent Group / Bouldnor Formation	Palaeogene	
Speeton Clay	Cretaceous	
Spilsby Sandstone	Cretaceous, Jurassic	
Stanford Formation	Jurassic	
Stockdale Shales	Silurian	
Suffolk Pebble Beds	Palaeogene	
Tamar Group / Torquay Formation	Devonian	
Tankerville Formation	Ordovician	
Tarnbrook Wyre Marine Beds	Carboniferous	
Temeside Shale	Silurian	
Thanet Formation	Palaeogene	
Blue Lias Formation	Jurassic	
Torquay Limestone	Devonian	
Trigonia clavellata Formation	Jurassic	
Upnor Formation	Palaeogene	
Upper Border Formation	Carboniferous	
Upper Bowland Shales	Carboniferous	
Upper Calcareous Grit	Jurassic	
Upper Chalk Formation	Cretaceous	
Upper Coal Measures Formation	Carboniferous	
Upper Comley Formation	Cambrian	
Upper Greensand Formation	Cretaceous	
Upper Headon Beds	Palaeogene	
Upper Limestone Group / Main Limestone IX Formation	Carboniferous	
Upper Ludlow Formation	Silurian	
Urswick Limestone	Carboniferous	
Warwickshire Group / Kenilworth Sandstone	Permian	
Waterhouses Limestone	Carboniferous	
Weald Clay	Cretaceous	
Weald Clay Group / Lower Weald Clay	Cretaceous	
Weald Clay Group / Upper Weald Clay	Cretaceous	
Wealden Formation	Cretaceous	
Wealden Group / Ashdown Formation	Cretaceous	
Wealden Group / Tunbridge Wells Sand Formation	Cretaceous	
Wealden Group / Vectis Formation	Cretaceous	
Wealden Group / Wadhurst Clay	Cretaceous	
Wealden Group / Weald Formation	Cretaceous	
Wealden Group / Weald Clay	Cretaceous	
Wealden Group / Wessex Formation	Cretaceous	
Weaver Beds	Carboniferous	
Wenlock Formation	Silurian	
Wenlock Shale	Silurian	
Wessex Formation	Cretaceous	
Westbury Formation	Triassic	
Westbury Shales	Triassic	
Weston Flags Formation	Ordovician	
Weybourne Crag Formation		
Whitby Mudstone Formation	Jurassic	
Whitcliffe Formation	Silurian	
Whitcliffe Beds	Silurian	
White Chalk Formation	Cretaceous	
White Limestone	Jurassic	
Wittering Formation	Palaeogene	
Woolwich & Reading Beds	Palaeogene	
Woolwich and Reading Formation	Palaeogene	
Wych Beds	Silurian	
Yeovil Sands	Jurassic	
Yoredale Group / Alston Formation	Carboniferous	
Zechstein Group / Marl Slate Formation	Permian	

== See also ==
- Lists of fossiliferous stratigraphic units in Europe
- Lists of fossiliferous stratigraphic units in the United Kingdom
