= Ludlow Group =

Geological formations in UK and Ireland

The Ludlow Group are geologic formations deposited during the Ludlow epoch of the Silurian period in the British Isles, in areas of England, Ireland, Scotland, and Wales.

== Formations ==
This group contains the following formations in descending order:

1. Tilestones Formation, Downton Castle Sandstone formation (90 ft./27.7 m),
2. Ledbury Formation shales (270 ft./83 m),
3. Upper Ludlow sub-group formation (140 ft./43 m),
4. Aymestry Limestone Formation (up to 40 ft./12.3 m),
5. Lower Ludlow sub-group formation (350 to 780 ft./108 m-240 m).

== Geology ==
The Ludlow group is essentially shaly in character, except towards the top, where the beds become more sandy and pass gradually into the Old Red Sandstone. The Aymestry limestone, which is irregular in thickness, is sometimes absent, and where the underlying Wenlock limestones are absent the shales of the Ludlow group graduate, downwards into the Wenlock shales.

In Wales the group is typically developed between namesake Ludlow and Aymestrey, and it occurs also in the detached Silurian areas between Dudley and the mouth of the Severn.

In the Lake District the Silurian Coldwell beds, forming the upper part of the Coniston Flags, are the equivalents of the Lower Ludlow. They are succeeded by the Coniston Grits (4,000 ft./1,230 m), the Bannisdale Slates (5200 ft./1,600 m) and the Kirkby Moor Flags (2,000 ft./615 m).

In the Silurian areas of southern Scotland, the Ludlow rocks are represented in the Kirkcudbright Shore and Riccarton districts by the Raeberry Castle Beds and Balmae Grits (500–750 ft.). In the northern belt within Lanarkshire and the Pentland Hills, the Lower Ludlow portion consists of mudstones, flaggy shales, and greywackes; and the upper Downton Castle Sandstone part is made up principally of thick red and yellow sandstones and conglomerates with green mudstones.

The Ludlow Group formations of Ireland include the Salrock beds of County Galway, and the Croagmarhin beds of Dingle Peninsula of County Kerry.

=== Lower Ludlow sub-group ===
The Lower Ludlow rocks are mainly grey, greenish and brown mudstones and sandy and calcareous shales. They contain an abundance of fossils. The Lower Ludlow series has been zoned by means of Monograptus species of Graptolites by E. M. R. Wood. The zonal forms in order from older/lower to younger/upper are: Monograptus vulgaris; Monograptus nilssoni; Monograptus scanicus; Monograptus tumescens; and Monograptus leintwardinensis.

In Denbighshire and Merionethshire the upper portion of the Denbighshire Grits belongs to this horizon. Those from lower to upper are: the Nantglyn Flags; the Upper Grit beds; the Monograptus leintwardinensis beds; and the Dinas Bran beds.

Lower Ludlow fossils

Cyathaspis ludensis, the earliest British vertebrate fossil, was found in these rocks at Leintwardine in Herefordshire, a noted fossil locality. Trilobites are numerous (Phacops caudatus, Lichas anglicus, Homolonotus delphinocephalus, Calymene Blumenbachii); brachiopods (Leptaena rhomboidalis, Rhynchonella Wilsoni, Atrypa reticularis), pelecypods (Cardiola interrupts, Ctenodonta sulcata) and gastropods and cephalopods (many species of Orthoceras and also Gomphoceras, Trochoceras) are well represented. Other fossils are Ceratiocaris, Pterygotus, Protaster, Palaeocoma and Palaeodiscus.

=== Upper Ludlow sub-group ===
The Upper Ludlow sub-group rocks are mainly soft mudstones and shales with some harder sandy beds capable of being worked as building-stones. These sandy beds are often found covered with ripple-marks and annelid tracks. One of the uppermost sandy layers is known as the " Fucoid bed " from the abundance of the seaweed-like impressions it bears.

At the top of this sub-group a brown layer occurs, from a quarter of an inch to 4 in. (63 mm to 100 mm) in thickness, full of the fragmentary remains of fish associated with those of Pterygotus and mollusca. This layer, known as the "Ludlow Bone bed," has been traced over a very large area.

The Tilestones, Downton Castle Sandstone, and Ledbury Formation shales are occasionally grouped together under the term Downtonian. They are in reality passage beds between the Silurian and Old Red Sandstone, and were originally placed in the latter system by Sir Roderick Murchison. They are mostly grey, yellow or red micaceous, shaly sandstones.

Upper Ludlow fossils

The common Upper Ludlow fossils include: plants (Actinophyllum, Chondrites), ostracods, phyllocarids, eurypterids; trilobites (less common than in the older Ludlow sub-groups); numerous brachiopods (Lingula cornea, Lingula minima, Chonetes striatella); crustaceans (ostracods); gastropods (Phyllocarida, Platyschisma helicites); bivalvia; and cephalopods (Orthoceras bullatum); and fish (Cephalaspis, Cyathaspis, Auchenaspis).

== See also ==
- Silurian Ireland
- Silurian United Kingdom
- Silurian geologic formations
