= Stanford Formation =

Geologic formation in England

- Stratigraphic range: Oxfordian
- Type: Formation
- Unit of: Corallian Group
- Underlies: Ampthill Clay Formation
- Overlies: Kingston Formation, West Walton Formation
- Thickness: 0 to 26 m around Oxford, up to about 15 m in the Calne-Swindon area

Lithology
- Primary: Limestone
- Other: Marl, Mudstone

Location
- Region: England
- Country: United Kingdom
- Extent: Wiltshire, Oxfordshire, Buckinghamshire

Type section
- Named for: Stanford in the Vale

The Stanford Formation is a geologic formation in England. It preserves fossils dating back to the Oxfordian stage of the Middle Jurassic period, around 160 million years ago.

== See also ==
- List of fossiliferous stratigraphic units in England
