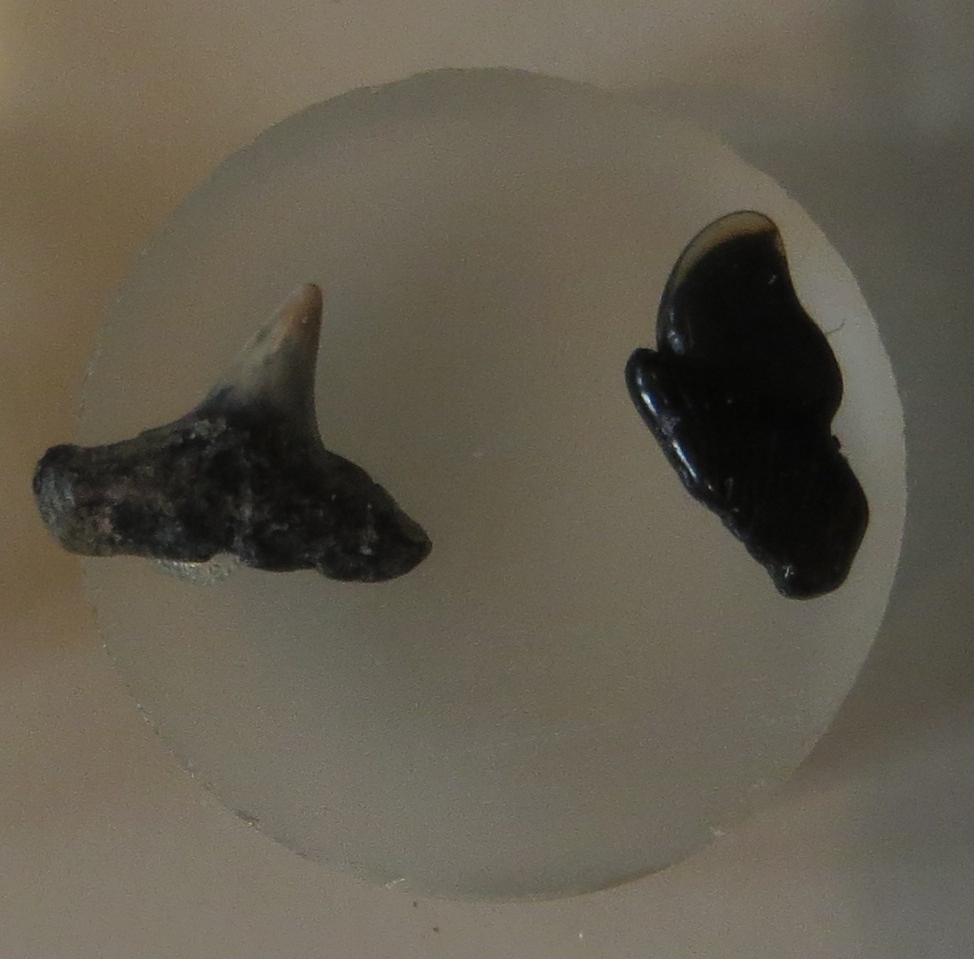
- Tooth of A. serratus (right) with a shark tooth

Scientific classification
- Kingdom: Animalia
- Phylum: Chordata
- Class: Actinopterygii
- Order: †Pycnodontiformes
- Genus: †Eotrigonodon; Weiler, 1929

= Eotrigonodon =

Eotrigonodon Temporal range: mid-Cretaceous to mid-Eocene

Extinct genus of fishes

Eotrigonodon ("dawn Trigonodon") is a dubious form genus of ray-finned fish known from the Cretaceous to the Eocene. It is known only from isolated teeth. Formerly considered an early genus of tetraodontiform fish in the family "Eotrigonodontidae", more recent studies indicate that they likely represent the pharyngeal teeth of pycnodonts, which are an unrelated, entirely extinct group of fish. In addition, it may itself be a junior synonym for Stephanodus, another taxon based on pycnodont teeth. Yet other authors retain the genus as taxonomically unresolved.

The following species are known:

- E. indicus Kumar & Loyal, 1987 - Early Eocene (Ypresian) of Himachal Pradesh, India (Subathu Formation)
- E. serratus (Gervais, 1852) - Ypresian of Saudi Arabia (Umm al-Rua’us Formation) & Belgium (Argile des Flandres Formation), Middle Eocene (Lutetian) of England (Elmore & Selsey Formations), Eocene of Pakistan (Kithar Formation) (=Sargus serratus Gervais, 1852)
- E. tabroumiti Tabaste, 1963 - Late Cretaceous (early Cenomanian) of Morocco (Kem Kem Group)
- E. wardhaensis Jain & Sahni, 1983 - Late Cretaceous (Maastrichtian) of Maharashtra (Lameta Formation) and Andhra Pradesh (Intertrappean Beds), India

Indeterminate remains are known from the Cenomanian of Brazil, the Late Paleocene of Mali, and the Lutetian of Ukraine.

== See also ==
- Prehistoric fish
- List of prehistoric bony fish
