= Ash Fell Edge =

Protected area in Cumbria, England

Coordinates: 54.437916°N 2.4100718°W

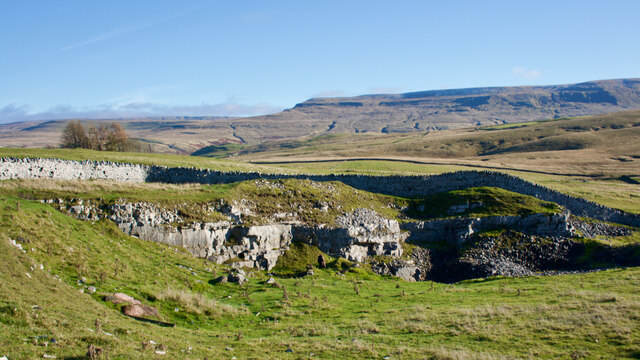
Ash Fell Edge

Ash Fell Edge is a Site of Special Scientific Interest (SSSI) in Cumbria, England. It is located within the Yorkshire Dales National Park 1.5km northeast of the village of Ravenstonedale. This area is protected because of the Carboniferous limestone geology here and the fossils preserved in the sediments. The rocks here formed on the floor of a shallow sea about 345 million years ago.

== Geology ==
The geology at Ash Fell Edge provides important exposures of Ashfell sandstone and Ashfell Limestone that are important components of the Great Scar Limestone Group. The rocks here provide evidence of sedimentation that occurred during the Dinantian period. Fossils recorded at Ash Fell Edge include the coral species from the genus Siphonodendron and bryozoa from Fistuliporidae. Plant fossils recorded here include species from the genus Archaeosigillaria.
