= Stephanodus =

Stephanodus Temporal range: Campanian–Middle Eocene

Scientific classification
- Kingdom: Animalia
- Phylum: Chordata
- Class: Actinopterygii
- Order: †Pycnodontiformes
- Family: †Pycnodontidae
- Genus: †Stephanodus; Zittel, 1883

Type species
- †Stephanodus lybicus Zittel, 1883

Synonyms
- Ancistrodon Debey, 1849; Grypodon Hay, 1899; ?Eotrigonodon Weiler, 1929

Extinct genus of fishes

Stephanodus is a form genus of extinct fossil ray-finned fish, referring to the hook-shaped pharyngeal teeth present on the branchial arch of pycnodonts.

Some species placed in this genus were previously assigned to the fossil genus Grypodon Hay, 1899, which itself was created to replace the former genus name Ancistrodon Debey, 1849 due to it being preoccupied by a junior synonym of the snake genus Agkistrodon. Eotrigonodon is likely also another synonym for the genus, but this is not completely certain.

The following species are placed in this genus:

- S. lybicus (Zittel, 1888) (type species) - Maastrichtian of Niger (Dukamaje Formation), Mali (Ménaka Formation) & India (Takli, Lameta, and Intertrappean Beds Formations), Paleocene of Mali (Tamaguélelt Formation), Eocene of India (Cambay Shale & Khuiala Formation)
- S. texanus (Dames, 1883) - Late Cretaceous of Texas, US
- S. mosensis (Dames, 1883) - Campanian of Germany (Vaals Greensand) and Maastrichtian of Netherlands (Maastricht Formation)

The alleged species S. armatus (Gervais, 1852) from the middle Eocene of Belgium and S. vicentinus (Dames, 1883) from the Oligocene of Italy likely represent indeterminate tetraodontiform teeth.
