= Knipe Scar Limestone =

Knipe Scar Limestone Formation
- Stratigraphic range: Visean
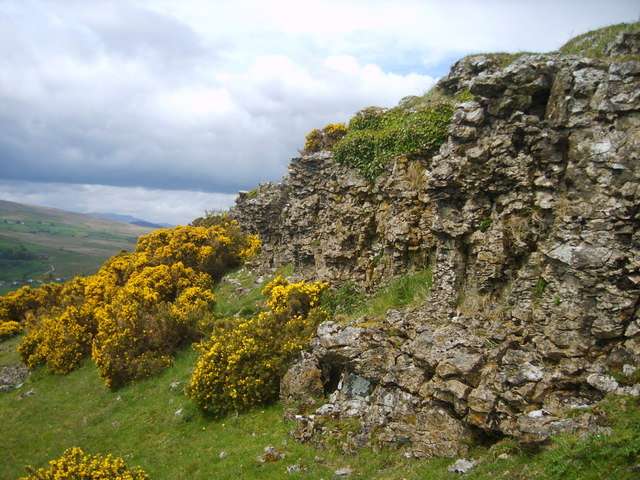
- Limestone outcrop on Knipescar common
- Type: Formation
- Unit of: Great Scar Limestone Group
- Thickness: up to 90 m (300 ft)

Lithology
- Primary: Limestone

Location
- Region: England
- Country: United Kingdom

Type section
- Named for: Knipescar Common
- Location: Great Asby Scar

The Knipe Scar Limestone is a geologic formation in England, found at Knipescar Common. It preserves fossils dating back to the Carboniferous period. It is part of the Great Asby Scar limestone group.

== See also ==
- List of fossiliferous stratigraphic units in England
