= Chillesford Church Pit =

Protected area in Suffolk, England

Coordinates: 52.117°N 1.478°E

- Site of Special Scientific Interest
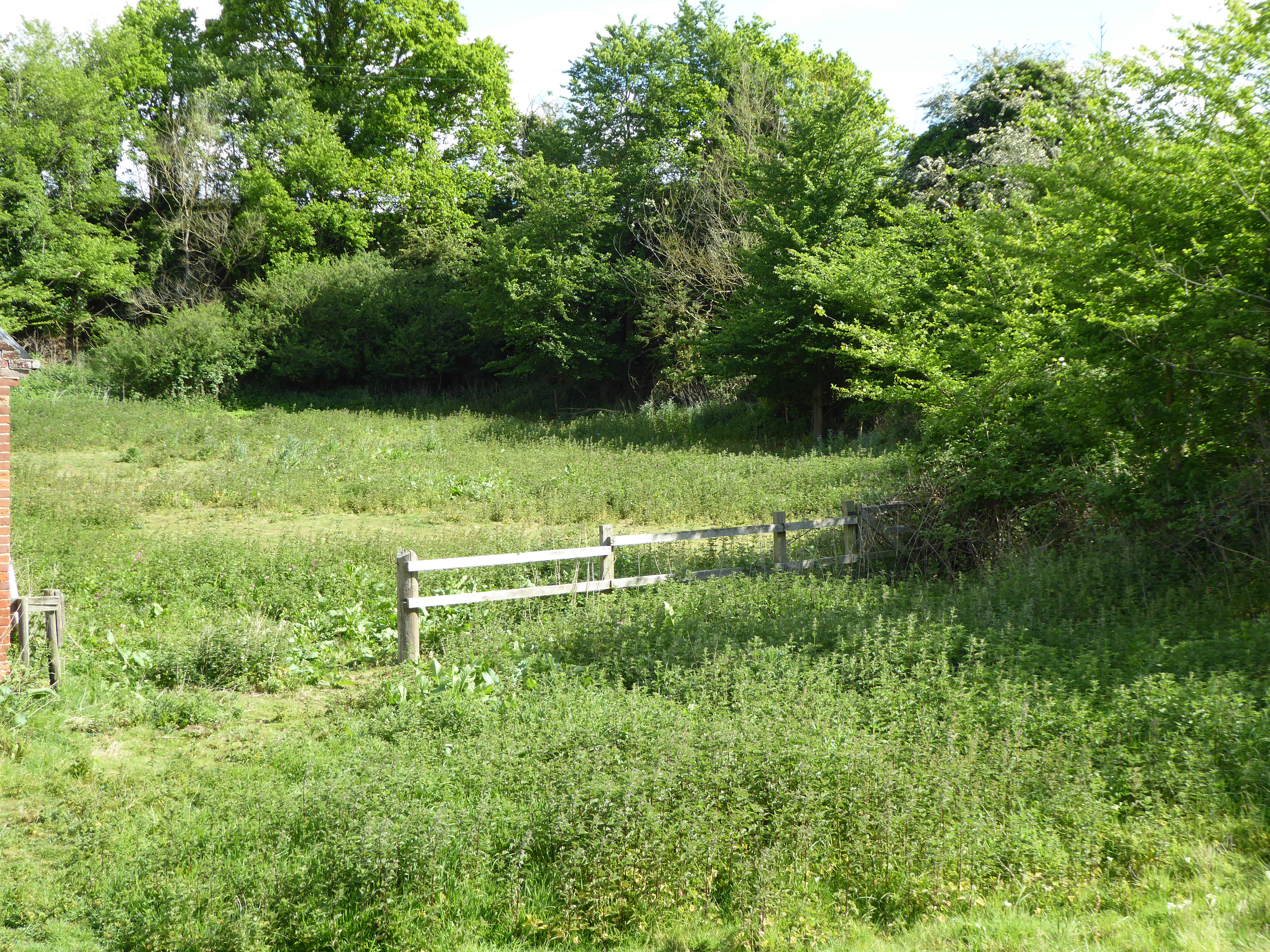
- Location of Chillesford Church Pit.
- Area of search: Suffolk
- Grid reference: TM 382 522
- Interest: Geological
- Area: 1.1 hectares
- Notification date: 1986
- Location map: Magic Map

Chillesford Church Pit is a 1.1-hectare (2.7-acre) geological Site of Special Scientific Interest in Chillesford, south of Saxmundham in Suffolk. It is a Geological Conservation Review site, and it is in the Suffolk Coast and Heaths Area of Outstanding Natural Beauty.

This site has deposits dating to the Early Pleistocene Bramertonian Stage, around 2.4 to 1.8 million years ago. Fossils of molluscs and pollen indicate a temperate climate dating to the Chillesford Crag formation. The Chillesford Clay and Chillesford Crag are parts for the Norwich Crag Formation.

The site is private land with no public access.
