= Weybourne Cliffs =

UK Site of Special Scientific Interest

- Site of Special Scientific Interest
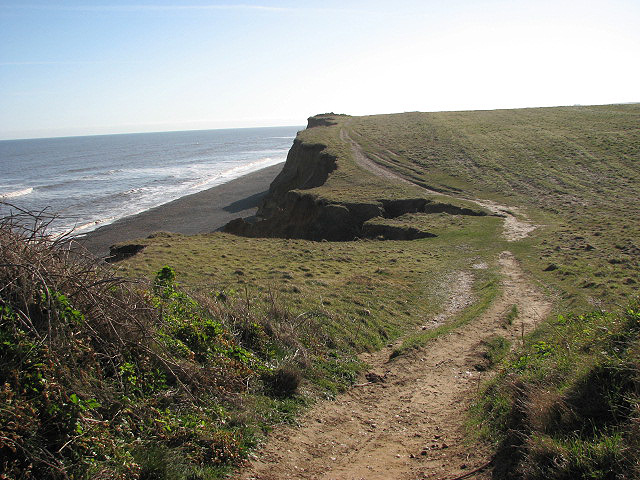
- Location of Weybourne Cliffs.
- Area of search: Norfolk
- Grid reference: TG 133 435
- Coordinates: 52.946°N 1.173°E
- Interest: Biological; Geological
- Area: 40.9 hectares (101 acres)
- Notification date: 1985
- Location map: Magic Map

Weybourne Cliffs is a 40.9-hectare (101-acre) biological and geological Site of Special Scientific Interest at Weybourne, west of Sheringham in the English county of Norfolk. It is a Geological Conservation Review site. It is in the Norfolk Coast Area of Outstanding Natural Beauty.

This Pleistocene site is the type locality for the Pastonian Weybourne Crag Formation, and its fossils of marine molluscs have been studied for 200 years. Its ecological interest lies in colonies of sand martins in the cliffs.

The beach is open to the public.
