= Kingston Formation =

- Stratigraphic range: Oxfordian
- Type: Formation
- Unit of: Corallian Group
- Underlies: Stanford Formation
- Overlies: West Walton Formation, Hazelbury Bryan Formation
- Thickness: Up to 30 m in Oxford, up to 15 m in the Calne-Highworth area.

Lithology
- Primary: Sandstone
- Other: Limestone, Mudstone

Location
- Region: England
- Country: United Kingdom
- Extent: Wiltshire, Oxfordshire

Type section
- Named for: Kingston Bagpuize

The Kingston Formation is a geologic formation in England. It preserves fossils dating back to the Jurassic period.

== See also ==
- List of fossiliferous stratigraphic units in England
