= Great Scar Limestone Group =

- Stratigraphic range: Arundian-Brigantian
- Type: Group
- Unit of: Carboniferous Limestone Supergroup
- Sub-units: See text
- Underlies: Yoredale Group
- Overlies: Ravenstonedale Group
- Thickness: Up to 800 m (2,600 ft)

Lithology
- Primary: Limestone
- Other: Mudstone, siltstone, sandstone

Location
- Region: England
- Country: United Kingdom
- Extent: Pennines to Isle of Man

The Great Scar Limestone Group is a lithostratigraphical term referring to a succession of generally fossiliferous rock strata which occur in the Pennines in northern England and in the Isle of Man within the Tournaisian and Visean stages of the Carboniferous Period.

It is contained within the Carboniferous Limestone Supergroup.

== Basinal successions ==
=== Stainmore Trough ===
The sequence in the Stainmore Trough is thus (youngest at top):

- Ashfell Sandstone (Arundian age)
- Breakyneck Scar Limestone (Arundian age)
- Red Hill Formation
- Brownber Formation (Chadian age)
- Scandal Beck Limestone (Chadian age)
- Coldbeck Limestone (Chadian age)

On the Alston Block corresponding to the North Pennines, the sequence contains the Melmerby Scar Limestone Formation.

=== Orton area ===
In the Orton area, the sequence is:

- Knipe Scar Limestone
- Potts Beck Limestone
- Ashfell Limestone
- Ashfell Sandstone
- Breakyneck Scar Limestone
- Brownber Formation
- Scandal Beck Limestone
- Coldbeck Limestone

=== Kendal, Skelsmergh and Deepslack outliers ===
In south Cumbria, the sequence is:

- Urswick Limestone
- Park Limestone
- Dalton Formation (time-equivalent of Breakyneck Scar Limestone in Stainmore Trough) (Arundian age)

=== Isle of Man ===
On the Isle of Man, the following sequence is identified in the Castletown area:

- Knockcrushen Formation (wackestones, packstones and mudstones; of Holkerian age)
- Derbyhaven Formation (packstones and mudstones with some mudstones and siltstones; of Arundian age)
  - Skillicore Member
  - Sandwick Member
  - Turkeyland Member

== See also ==
- List of fossiliferous stratigraphic units in England
