= Cut-off Channel =

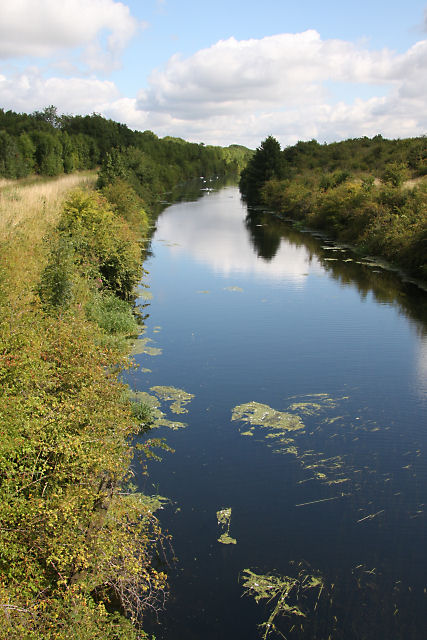
- The Cut-off Channel near Feltwell

Location
- Country: England
- Counties: Norfolk, Suffolk

Physical characteristics
- Source
  - location: Mildenhall, Suffolk
- Mouth: Denver Sluice
  - location: Denver, Norfolk
- Length: 28 mi (45 km)

The Cut-off Channel is a man-made waterway which runs along the eastern edge of the Fens in Norfolk and Suffolk, England. It was constructed in the 1950s and 1960s as part of flood defence measures, and carries the headwaters of the River Wissey, River Lark and River Little Ouse in times of flood, delivering them to Denver Sluice on the River Great Ouse. In the summer months, it is also used as part of a water supply scheme for drinking water in Essex.

The scheme was first suggested by the drainage engineer Cornelius Vermuyden in 1639, but was not pursued at the time, probably because of the cost. It was again suggested by John Rennie in 1810, but again the cost was prohibitive. Flooding events in 1937 and 1939 caused the newly formed Great Ouse Catchment Board to resurrect the plan, and disastrous floods in 1947 resulted in construction starting in 1954, as part of a bigger scheme to address the issues faced by communities living near to the Great Ouse. in 1968, water companies in Essex developed a plan to transfer drinking water from the Great Ouse to reservoirs at Abberton and Hanningfield. The scheme was completed in 1971, and results in water flowing in the reverse direction along the Cut-off Channel, from Denver to an intake at Blackdyke, from where tunnels, pipelines and rivers convey it to Essex.

Over its 28-mile (45 km) length, the channel passes through a variety of soil types, and this provides several types of habitat. Surveys in 1997 and 1998 revealed that the depressed river mussel had colonised the waterway. In order to meet the requirements of the Water Framework Directive, a syphon fish pass was constructed between the Channel and the River Wissey in 2013, to prevent fish becoming trapped in the Channel, with no access to suitable habitat or other waterways.

== History ==
=== Background ===
From the 1630s, there was a lot of interest in draining the Fens, to convert them from marsh to agricultural land. In 1638, King Charles I had appealed for "divers gentlemen, experts in such adventure, to give their advice, how these lands might be made winter grounds." Among those who responded was the Dutch drainage engineer Cornelius Vermuyden, who presented the King with a discourse in January 1639. His six-point plan envisaged diverting the River Welland; building a navigable sluice on the Old River Nene, below Stanground; building floodbanks along 12 miles (19 km) of Morton's Leam, set back from the channel to allow it to hold flood water; improvements to the River Nene from Guyhim to Wisbech; building bigger and better banks set further back from the Bedford River, a new channel which had recently been completed; and a cut-off drain along the eastern edge of the Fens to take water from the River Wissey, River Lark and River Little Ouse and return it to the River Great Ouse at Denver. Only some of this was carried out, and the cut-off channel was one of the items which did not get constructed. The issues were probably financial, but all records for the work carried out were destroyed in the Great Fire of London in 1666, when the Fen Office was burnt down.

In the early 1800s, the drainage of the southern fens was still inadequate, and John Rennie was consulted. Amongst other schemes that he suggested was the construction of a catchwater drain running round the southern and eastern boundaries of the fens, from Stanground on the River Nene to Denver on the Great Ouse. In this case, we know that the issues were financial, since he estimated that it would cost £1,188,189 (equivalent to £80,671,701 in 2025) to implement.

A series of flood events in 1937 and 1939 required the Great Ouse Catchment Board to consider action. Failure of a bank had caused some flooding in Soham, but more serious was that water levels in the vast washland between the Great Barrier Banks, either side of the Bedford Rivers, had been higher than the banks, and widespread flooding had only been prevented by continuous lines of sandbags placed on the bank tops. Anticipated failure of the western bank did not take place, saving large areas from being inundated. This was not the case in 1947, when breaches occurred on several banks and some 58 square miles (150 km^{2}) of land in the South Level was underwater. Further north, the Welland flooded 31 square miles (80 km^{2}) near Crowland. In the South Level, many families had to abandon their homes, until teams of army engineers and volunteers were able to repair the damaged banks and pump the water from the land over the next several weeks.

Following the 1939 crisis, the Great Ouse Catchment Board, set up under the Land Drainage Act 1930, employed the civil engineer Sir Murdoch MacDonald as a consulting engineer, to develop a solution. Discussion continued through the 1940s, and he proposed a cut-off channel, to collect the waters from the Little Ouse, Wissey and Lark, and deliver them to Denver, and a relief channel, running parallel to the Great Ouse for 10.5 miles (16.9 km) from Denver to King's Lynn. The route was very similar to that selected by Vermuyden, leaving the River Lark above Mildenhall, rather than below it, but otherwise, much the same. W E Doran, the Chief Engineer for the Great Ouse River Board, the successor to the catchment board, stated that "had Vermuyden's original ideas been followed, most of this trouble could have been avoided."

=== Construction ===
After delays caused by the Second World War, the 1947 floods brought the scheme to the foreground again, and construction of three schemes, the cut-off channel, the relief channel, and improvements to the Great Ouse between Denver and Ely, began in 1954. They were finished by 1964. Around 40 per cent of the water in the Great Ouse is supplied by the three eastern rivers. At about the same time, planners were considering how to resolve water supply problems in Essex, where development and expansion were hampered by a lack of available drinking water supplies. By 1968, a scheme had been designed, that involved reversing the flow on the Cut-off Channel during the summer months. Water is fed into the channel by the sluice at Denver, and flows southwards to Blackdyke Intake, between the River Wissey and the River Little Ouse. From Blackdyke Intake, the water descends 90 feet (27 m) down a shaft to a low-level tunnel, at the far end of which is Kennett Pumping Station, which raises the water 280 feet (85 m) to the surface. Pipelines carry it to Kirtling Green outfall, where it enters Kirtling Brook, a tributary of the River Stour, to be extracted from the river system further downstream, for pumping to Abberton Reservoir or Hanningfield Reservoir. This is known as the Ely-Ouse to Essex Water Transfer Scheme. When work began, it was a joint project between Southend Waterworks Company and South Essex Waterworks Company, but by the time it was completed in 1971, the companies had merged to become Essex Water, and have since become Essex and Suffolk Water.

== Flora and fauna ==
The channel provides a variety of habitats, because is passes through different soil types along its length. Near Fordham and West Dereham, the river bed is composed of Sandringham Sands with coarse pebbles and a high quartz content. In these conditions, the channel becomes choked with dense mats of the green algae Cladophora glomerata and Canadian pond weed. Near Methwold and Feltwell, the underlying rocks are chalk, resulting in the bed being covered in fine silts, on which little aquatic flora grows. Near Hockwold cum Wilton, flora is dominated by shining pondweed and Canadian pond weed. Surveys in 1997 and 1998 found that the channel has been colonised by a small population of depressed river mussel, which were first found at Brookville, near Methwold, where the bed consists of fine chalky silts. The intake for the Ely-Ouse to Essex Transfer Scheme is at Blackdyke, and in order to prevent the intakes getting clogged with vegetation, a stretch of about 0.6 miles (1 km) either side of the intake is dredged with a dragline each year. The channel, which is about 16 feet (4.9 m) deep at this point, supports blanket weed at the sides, and the bed consists of chalk silt. Examination of the dredgings revealed irregular distributions of the depressed river mussel in this location as well.

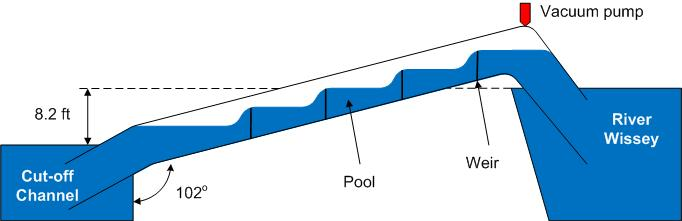
Cross section of the syphon fish weir used to connect the Cut-off Channel to the River Wissey without compromising the flood defences

Under the Water Framework Directive, there is an obligation to achieve good chemical and ecological status on all bodies of water within the EU. The Cut-off Channel failed to meet these requirements, because fish could enter the channel at Denver sluice, and become trapped, with no access to suitable habitat or links to other waterways. The solution adopted was to provide a fish pass between the channel and the River Wissey. There is a difference in level of about 8.2 feet (2.5 m) where they cross, and any solution needed to maintain the integrity of the flood defence structures, while being suitable for a variety of fish types, including gudgeon, perch, pike and roach. The solution adopted was a syphon fish pass, designed in Holland, but adapted to suit the UK conditions. This included an integrated eel pass, cut off valves to allow the syphon to be isolated, and telemetry monitoring. The construction project lasted for nine months in 2013, and cost £407,000, although installation of the syphon was achieved in just four days. The Environment Agency worked with Hull International Fisheries Institute to assess its initial effectiveness, and developed a five-year plan with Cranfield University for ongoing monitoring, to include study of trout spawning runs and silver eel migration.

== Water Quality ==
The Environment Agency measure the water quality of the river systems in England. Each is given an overall ecological status, which may be one of five levels: high, good, moderate, poor and bad. There are several components that are used to determine this, including biological status, which looks at the quantity and varieties of invertebrates, angiosperms and fish. Chemical status, which compares the concentrations of various chemicals against known safe concentrations, is rated good or fail.

The water quality of the Cut-off Channel was as follows in 2019.

Section	Ecological Status	Chemical Status	Length	Catchment	Channel
Cut-off Channel	Moderate	Fail	28.1 miles (45.2 km)	58.55 square miles (151.6 km^{2})	artificial

The water quality has not been rated as good due to physical modification of the channel, low flows, and discharges from sewage treatment works, all of which affect dissolved oxygen levels. Like most rivers in the UK, the chemical status changed from good to fail in 2019, due to the presence of polybrominated diphenyl ethers (PBDE) and perfluorooctane sulphonate (PFOS), neither of which had previously been included in the assessment.

== Points of interest ==
Point	Coordinates (Links to map resources)	OS Grid Ref	Notes
End of Channel	52.5828°N 0.3466°E	TF590009	Denver Sluice
Sluices on River Wissey	52.5605°N 0.5104°E	TL702988	
Blackdyke Intake	52.4655°N 0.4888°E	TL691881	Ely-Ouse to Essex Transfer Scheme
Sluices on River Little Ouse	52.4538°N 0.5470°E	TL731870	
Sluice on River Lark	52.3361°N 0.5394°E	TL731739	Start of Channel
Kennett Pumping Station	52.2875°N 0.4944°E	TL702684	

== Bibliography ==
- Baker, Roy; et al. (1998). "A survey of Pseudanodonta complanata in Norfolk". English Nature (Research Reports). ISSN 0967-876X. Archived from the original on 11 October 2017.
- Darby, H C (1968). The Draining of the Fens. Cambridge University Press. ISBN 978-1-107-40298-0.
- ESW (2006). "Abberton Reservoir Expansion Project" (PDF). Essex and Suffolk Water. Archived from the original (PDF) on 5 March 2016.
- Holley, Chris (19 December 2013). "Ely Dry – Essex Wet: the Great Ouse Cut Off Channel". Ouse Washes LPS. Archived from the original on 12 April 2018.
- Jerrom, Kye; Widdison, Marcus (2013). "A Case study for technical fish pass solutions, Norfolk" (PDF). River Restoration Centre.
- Skempton, Sir Alec; et al. (2002). A Biographical Dictionary of Civil Engineers in Great Britain and Ireland: Vol 1: 1500 to 1830. Thomas Telford. ISBN 978-0-7277-2939-2.
