= Longville =

Longville may refer to:

== Places ==
- Longville, California, United States
- Longville, Louisiana, United States
- Longville, Minnesota, United States

- Longville Municipal Airport, airport in Minnesota

- Longville, Missouri, United States
- Longville in the Dale, village in Shropshire, England

- Longville railway station, station at Longville in the Dale, England

- Cheney Longville, village in Shropshire, England

- Cheney Longville Castle, 14th-century manor house
- Cheney Longville Formation, geological formation

- Newton Longville, village in Buckinghamshire, England

- Newton Longville railway station, proposed station on East West Rail line

- Weston Longville, civil parish in Norfolk

== People with the surname ==
- John Longville (born 1949), American politician
