= Woburn Sands Formation =

Geological formation in England

Coordinates: 52°02′10″N 0°23′26″W

- Stratigraphic range: Late Aptian- Early Albian
- Type: Geological formation
- Unit of: Lower Greensand Group
- Underlies: Gault Formation
- Overlies: Jurassic or older rocks, usually mudstones of the Ancholme Group like the Oxford Clay, Kimmeridge Clay and Ampthill Clay
- Thickness: up to 120 metres (390 ft)

Lithology
- Primary: Sandstone
- Other: Clay

Location
- Region: Europe
- Country: England
- Extent: Bedfordshire, Buckinghamshire, Cambridgeshire

Type section
- Named for: Woburn, Bedfordshire
- Location: Disused fuller's earth workings between Woburn Sands and Woburn

The Woburn Sands Formation is a geological formation in England. Part of the Lower Greensand Group, it is the only unit of the group where it occurs, and thus is sometimes simply referred to as the 'Lower Greensand' in these areas. It was deposited during the late Aptian to early Albian stages of the Early Cretaceous. The lithology consists of sandstone or loose sand with rare wisps or thin seams of clay. The formation was extensively exploited in the 19th century for the "coprolite industry", with coprolite being a local term referring to phosphate nodules of varying origins (often the internal moulds of shells), named due to their resemblance to real coprolites. The formation contains reworked fossils of late Tithonian-Berriasian age from deposits that are no longer found locally, equivalent in age to the Sandringham Sand Formation in Norfolk and the Spilsby Sandstone of Lincolnshire, these include Dicranodonta and the ammonite Subcraspedites. Reworked dinosaur material is known from the formation, including iguanodontian teeth, vertebrae and hand bones, as well as a possible turiasaurian sauropod tooth, and the dubious stegosaurian dinosaur Craterosaurus (represented by a partial vertebra).
