= Passage Beds =

- Stratigraphic range: Oxfordian
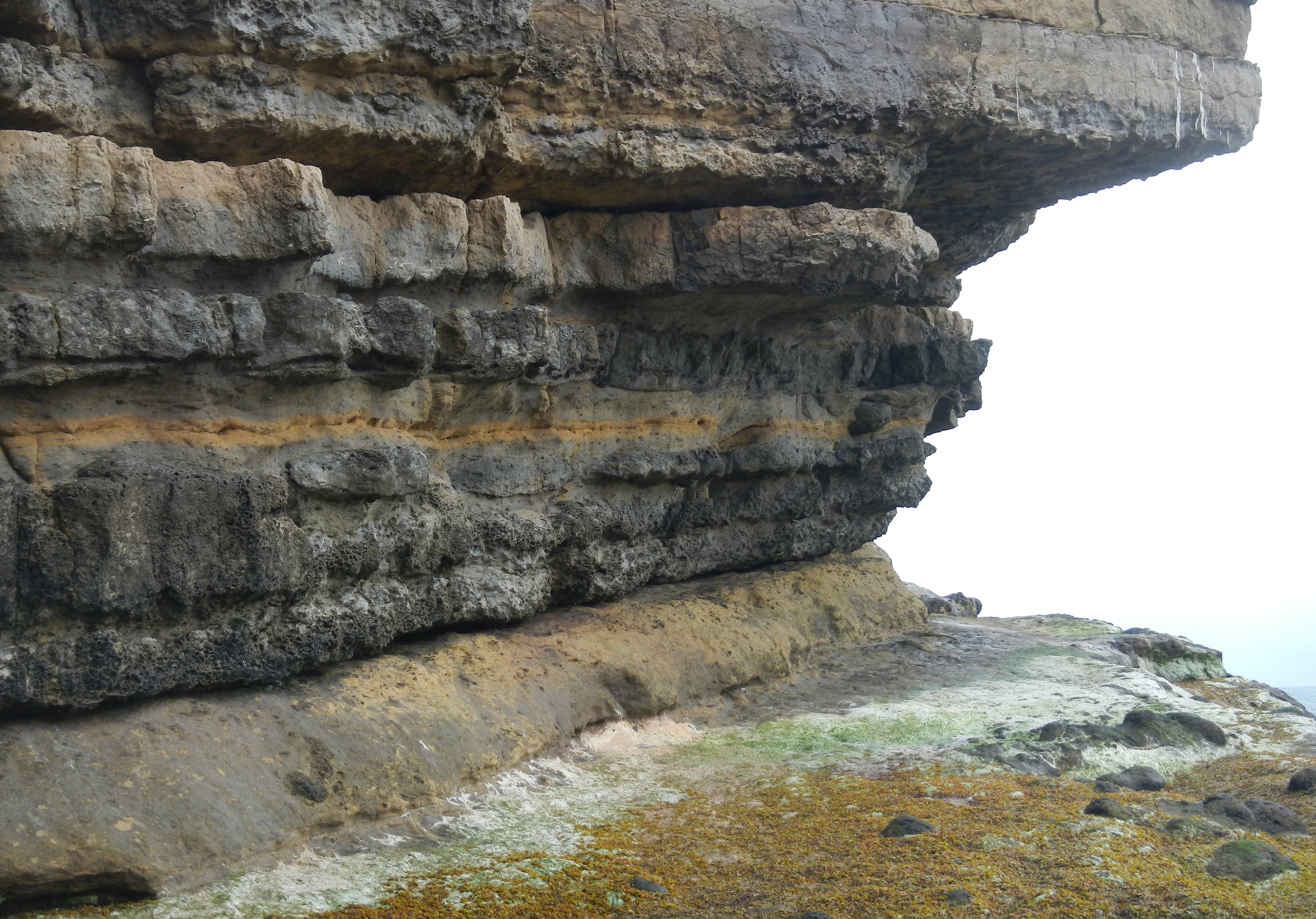
- Passage Beds at Filey Brigg, North Yorkshire
- Type: Member
- Unit of: Corallian Oolite Formation

Lithology
- Primary: Sandstone

Location
- Coordinates: 54.2°N 0.3°W
- Region: England
- Country: United Kingdom

The Passage Beds is a member of the Corallian Oolite Formation, a geologic formation in England. The subtidal to marine sandstone preserves fossils of bivalves, gastropods, crinoids, echinoids and ammonites dating back to the Late Jurassic period (Oxfordian stage).

== See also ==
- List of fossiliferous stratigraphic units in England
