= Roeburndale Formation =

Geological formation in England

- Stratigraphic range: Carboniferous
- Type: Formation

Location
- Region: England
- Country: United Kingdom

The Roeburndale Formation is a geologic formation in England. It preserves fossils dating back to the Carboniferous period. Narrowly defined, it is located around Lancaster, Garstang and Settle. It is part of a wider formation extending across Craven District and Harrogate.

The British Geological Survey considers the term obsolete, and refers users to the Roeburndale Member and the Silsden Formation.

It is named for the River Roeburn which has its catchment within the formation.

== See also ==
- List of fossiliferous stratigraphic units in England
