= Creechbarrow Limestone =

- Stratigraphic range: Paleogene
- Type: Formation

Location
- Region: England
- Country: United Kingdom

The Creechbarrow Limestone is a geologic formation in England. It preserves fossils dating back to the Paleogene period.

== See also ==
- List of fossiliferous stratigraphic units in England

== Bibliography ==
- Various Contributors to the Paleobiology Database. "Fossilworks: Gateway to the Paleobiology Database". Archived from the original on 19 August 2022.
