= Downton Castle Sandstone =

- Stratigraphic range: Silurian Pridoli
- Type: Formation
- Unit of: Old Red Sandstone
- Sub-units: Lower Bone Bed Member, Platyschisma Shale Member
- Underlies: Temeside Shale
- Thickness: 15m in type area; 17m at Ludlow, 15-20m in South Staffordshire

Lithology
- Primary: Sandstone
- Other: Siltstone, Mudstone

Location
- Region: England
- Country: United Kingdom

The Downton Castle Sandstone is a geologic formation in England. It preserves fossils dating back to the Silurian period. As its name would suggest the formation predominantly consists of sandstone with minor siltstone and mudstone. The oldest known Trigonotarbid Palaeotarbus is known from the formation.

== See also ==
- Grey Downtonian
- List of fossiliferous stratigraphic units in England
