= Farne Group =

- Stratigraphic range: Carboniferous
- Type: Group
- Sub-units: Scremerston Formation

Location
- Region: England
- Country: United Kingdom

The Farne Group is a geologic group in England. It preserves fossils dating back to the Carboniferous period.

== See also ==
- List of fossiliferous stratigraphic units in England
