= Mytton Flag Formation =

Site; has fossils from Ordovician period

- Stratigraphic range: Ordovician
- Type: Formation

Location
- Region: England
- Country: United Kingdom

The Mytton Flag Formation is a geologic formation in England. It preserves fossils dating back to the Ordovician period.

== See also ==
- List of fossiliferous stratigraphic units in England
