= Torquay Limestone =

Geologic formation in England

- Stratigraphic range: Devonian
- Type: Formation
- Unit of: Tamar Group

Lithology
- Primary: Limestone

Location
- Region: England
- Country: United Kingdom

The Torquay Limestone is a geologic formation in England. It preserves fossils dating back to the Devonian period.

== See also ==
- List of fossiliferous stratigraphic units in England
