= Tamar Group =

- Stratigraphic range: Emsian-Tournaisian
- Type: Group
- Sub-units: Burraton Formation, Tavy Formation, Torquay Limestone
- Underlies: Chudleigh Group (faulted)
- Overlies: Meadfoot Group
- Thickness: over 6,700 m (22,000 ft) on N Cornish coast

Lithology
- Primary: Mudstone
- Other: Siltstone, sandstone, limestone, spilite, hyaloclastite, tuff

Location
- Region: England
- Country: United Kingdom
- Extent: south Devon to north Cornwall

Type section
- Named for: valley of River Tamar

The Tamar Group is an early Devonian to early Carboniferous geologic group in south Devon and north Cornwall in southwest England. The name is derived from the valley of the River Tamar on the Devon/Cornwall border. The Group comprises (in ascending order) the Torquay Limestone, Tavy and Burraton formations. Some of the rocks are fossiliferous.

== See also ==
- List of fossiliferous stratigraphic units in England
