= Osmington Oolite =

- Stratigraphic range: Jurassic
- Type: Formation

Location
- Region: England
- Country: United Kingdom

The Osmington Oolite is a geologic formation in England. It preserves fossils dating back to the Jurassic period.

== See also ==
- List of fossiliferous stratigraphic units in England
