= Hempstead Formation =

Geologic formation in England

- Stratigraphic range: Paleogene
- Type: Formation

Location
- Region: England
- Country: United Kingdom

The Hempstead Formation is a geologic formation in England. It preserves fossils dating back to the Paleogene period.

== See also ==
- List of fossiliferous stratigraphic units in England
