= Downton Group =

Geological formation in England

- Stratigraphic range: Silurian
- Type: Group

Location
- Region: England
- Country: United Kingdom

The Downton Group is a geologic group in England. It preserves fossils dated to the Silurian period.

== See also ==
- List of fossiliferous stratigraphic units in England
