= Oldhaven Formation =

- Stratigraphic range: Eocene, Ypresian
- Type: Formation
- Sub-units: Herne Bay Member
- Underlies: London Clay Formation (Swanscombe Member)
- Thickness: up to 10 metres (33 ft) thick

Lithology
- Primary: Clay

Location
- Region: England
- Country: United Kingdom

The Oldhaven Formation is a geologic formation in England, outcropping near Herne Bay, Kent. According to Philip Hadland, it preserves finely preserved fossils, such as those belonging to birds, fishes, snakes and turtles, dating back to the Eocene epoch (Ypresian).

== See also ==
- List of fossiliferous stratigraphic units in England
