= Alston Formation =

Geologial formation in England

- Stratigraphic range: Viséan-Serpukhovian (Asbian-Pendleian); ~339–320 Ma
- Type: Formation
- Unit of: Yoredale Group

Lithology
- Primary: Limestone

Location
- Coordinates: 55.1°N 2.8°W
- Approximate paleocoordinates: 2.7°S 2.9°E
- Region: England
- Country: United Kingdom
- Alston Formation (England)

The Alston Formation is a geological formation in England. It preserves fossils dating back to the Viséan to Serpukhovian (Asbian, Brigantian and Pendleian in British stratigraphy) stages of the Carboniferous period.

== See also ==
- List of fossiliferous stratigraphic units in England
