= Overton Formation =

- Stratigraphic range: Silurian
- Type: Formation

Location
- Region: England
- Country: United Kingdom

The Overton Formation is a geologic formation in England. It preserves fossils dating back to the Silurian period.

== See also ==
- List of fossiliferous stratigraphic units in England
