= Lynton Slates =

- Stratigraphic range: Devonian
- Type: Formation

Lithology
- Primary: Slate

Location
- Region: England
- Country: United Kingdom

The Lynton Slates is a geologic formation in England. It preserves fossils dating back to the Devonian period.

== See also ==
- List of fossiliferous stratigraphic units in England
