= Colsterdale Marine Beds =

- Stratigraphic range: Carboniferous
- Type: Formation

Location
- Region: England
- Country: United Kingdom

The Colsterdale Marine Beds is a geologic formation in North Yorkshire, England. It is exposed in Colsterdale and upper Nidderdale, and has fossils dating back to the Carboniferous period.

== See also ==
- List of fossiliferous stratigraphic units in England
