= Wittering Formation =

Geologic formation in England

- Stratigraphic range: Ypresian - Lutetian
- Type: Formation
- Sub-units: Bracklesham Group
- Underlies: Earnley Sand Formation
- Overlies: London Clay, Thames Group
- Thickness: 40-53 m

Lithology
- Primary: Clay
- Other: Sand

Location
- Region: England
- Country: Hampshire Basin, United Kingdom

Type section
- Named for: Wittering

The Wittering Formation is a geologic formation in England. It preserves fossils dating back to the Paleogene period.

== See also ==
- List of fossiliferous stratigraphic units in England
