= Duyfor Mudstone =

- Stratigraphic range: Ordovician
- Type: Formation

Lithology
- Primary: Mudstone

Location
- Region: England
- Country: United Kingdom

The Duyfor Mudstone is a geologic formation in England. It preserves fossils dating back to the Ordovician period.

== See also ==
- List of fossiliferous stratigraphic units in England
