= Urswick Limestone =

Geological formation in England

- Stratigraphic range: Carboniferous
- Type: Formation
- Unit of: Great Scar Limestone Group

Location
- Region: England
- Country: United Kingdom

The Urswick Limestone is a geologic formation in England. It preserves fossils dating back to the Carboniferous period.

== See also ==
- List of fossiliferous stratigraphic units in England
