= Tarnbrook Wyre Marine Beds =

- Stratigraphic range: Carboniferous
- Type: Formation

Location
- Region: England
- Country: United Kingdom

The Tarnbrook Wyre Marine Beds is a geologic formation in England. It preserves fossils dating back to the Carboniferous period.

== See also ==
- List of fossiliferous stratigraphic units in England
