= Selborne Group =

Geologic group in England

- Stratigraphic range: Albian-Cenomanian 113–94 Ma
- Type: Group
- Sub-units: Gault Formation, Upper Greensand Formation
- Underlies: Chalk Group
- Overlies: Lower Greensand Group
- Thickness: up to 110 m in the Weald, but in marginal areas may be less than 5 m thick.

Lithology
- Primary: Glauconitic Sandstone,
- Other: Mudstone, Limestone & Marl

Location
- Region: England
- Country: United Kingdom

The Selborne Group is a geologic group in England. It preserves fossils dating back to the Cretaceous period. It comprises the Gault Formation (informally/traditionally the Gault Clay or Blue Marl) and the overlying Upper Greensand Formation (earlier known as the Malm or Malm Rock).

== See also ==
- List of fossiliferous stratigraphic units in England
