= Aymestry Limestone =

Geologic formation in England

- Stratigraphic range: Silurian
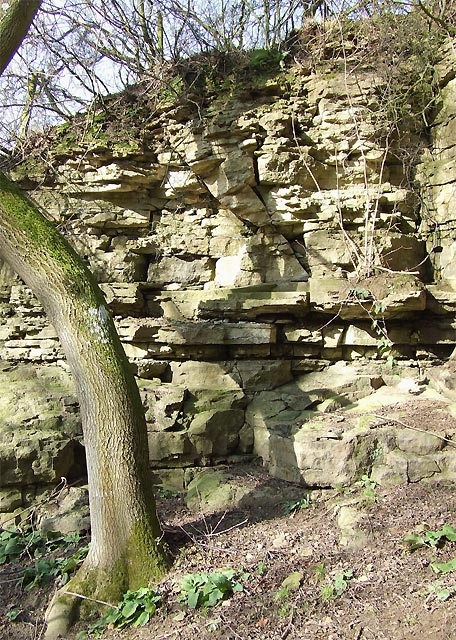
- Aymestry Limestone in a quarry, Shropshire
- Type: Formation
- Underlies: Upper Ludlow Shales Group
- Overlies: Lower Ludlow Shales Group
- Thickness: Up to 48 m (157 ft)

Lithology
- Primary: Limestone
- Other: Mudstone, sandstone

Location
- Region: Welsh Marches, West Midlands, Coalbrookdale & Malvern Hills
- Country: United Kingdom

Type section
- Named for: Aymestrey

The Aymestry Limestone is a fossiliferous limestone of Gorstian age (Upper Silurian) deposited in a warm shallow sea near the eastern margin of the Iapetus Ocean. It occurs in England in the Ludlow Group, between the Upper and Lower Ludlow Shales. It derives its name from Aymestrey (sic), Herefordshire, where it may be seen on both sides of the River Lugg. It is well developed in the neighbourhood of Ludlow (it is sometimes called the Ludlow limestone) and occupies a similar position in the Ludlow shales at Woolhope, the Abberley Hills, May Hill and the Malvern Hills.

== Description ==
In lithological character, this limestone varies greatly; in one place it is a dark grey, somewhat crystalline limestone, elsewhere it passes into a flaggy, earthy or shaly condition, or even into a mere layer of nodules. When well developed it may reach 50 ft. in thickness in beds of from 1 to 5 ft.; in this condition it naturally forms a conspicuous feature in the landscape because it stands out by its superior hardness from the soft shales above and below.

The most common fossil is Pentamerus knightii, which is extremely abundant in places. Other brachiopods, corals and trilobites are present, and are similar to those found in the Wenlock limestone.

== See also ==
- List of fossiliferous stratigraphic units in England
- List of types of limestone
