= Geology of Berkshire =

Geology of English County (Berkshire)

Geological map of Berkshire, 1911

Geological map of Oxfordshire and Berkshire, 1913

The surface of the county of Berkshire, England, can be divided into three bands: the county's downlands, south and east of which the London Clay spans almost the whole county, and in the south-east corner sandy Palaeogene heath covers the London Clay. This is an oversimplification, because not everywhere have later layers been eroded away and because layers between the chalk and the London Clay survive in some places.

The western end of the county lies over the Berkshire syncline, and the whole county is shaped by the north-western limb of the London Basin 'synform' that forms the Chilterns (and further west, the Berkshire Downs), and the chalk and later deposits that have filled both synforms.

== The Berkshire syncline ==
The oldest rocks found by boreholes in Berkshire belong to the Devonian Lower Old Red Sandstone. They are in two clusters: around 1,300 metres beneath the Berkshire Downs near Lambourn, where they lie beneath one rim of the Berkshire syncline, and around 325 metres beneath Slough and Langley. There is a third cluster at Sonning, just across the Thames in Oxfordshire.

The Variscan orogeny pushed Devonian and earlier layers upwards by more than 700 metres to form a long, elliptical groove running from east of Maidenhead for more than 100km west-north-westwards, up beneath what is now the Ridgeway towards Aston Tirrold in Oxfordshire. Seismic scans suggest the syncline may have been more than 1,200 metres deep (more than 1,500 metres below current Ordnance Survey datum).

Late in the Carboniferous period, river-mouth sediments and a little coal raised the floor of the Berkshire syncline. There are igneous intrusions into Carboniferous layers at Burnt Hill, Stratfield Mortimer and Beech Hill. No Coal Measures layers have been found below Burnt Hill, but there are two thick layers of basalt with a narrow layer of tuff between them. The basalts are weathered, some at least of which took place in the open air. At Stratfield Mortimer and Beech Hill, the igneous rocks are dolerite and form seams between Coal Measures layers. Dolerite cuts through the basalt in places at Burnt Hill. Two suggestions have been made, both problematic: lava may have been erupted at Burnt Hill, but no structures suggesting a long-ago volcano have been found, while the dolerite is clearly later and may be 'feeder' channels; it is also less weathered than the basalt. Another possibility is that in all three places we are seeing 'intrusions' into gaps in Carboniferous layers, comparable to igneous intrusions in Nottinghamshire and Leicestershire, where dolerites cut through some beds of Westphalian age but are overlain by others. It does appear that the volcanic events that produced these layers probably occurred during the Carboniferous.

Some Triassic layers (at the western end), Jurassic layers (thick at the western end, narrowing eastwards), Cretaceous layers and finally Palaeogene layers (from around Welford to Maidenhead) filled up the syncline.

== Near-surface geology ==
=== Downlands ===
A gently folded succession of sedimentary rocks dating from the Cretaceous period, with some surviving Palaeogene cover and extensive Quaternary deposits, characterises the downlands, which cover the area to the west of Reading and the western edge of the Chilterns. The folding is attributable to the Alpine orogeny that began in the Palaeocene and continues today. The lower (early) Cretaceous rocks are sandstones and mudstones washed off the London Platform (now visible only on the slopes of Walbury Hill) whilst those of the upper (late) Cretaceous are the various formations that comprise the Chalk Group. In Berkshire, White Chalk Formation beds tend to be shallower than those further west (Wiltshire) or those in the Chilterns, and often contain layers of chalk rock. Less consolidated Palaeogene clays, sands, gravels and silts of the Lambeth, Thames and Bracklesham Groups overlie these rocks in some areas, and sarsen stones are found extensively on the surface and in river gravels west of Reading. The Alpine orogeny saw the London Platform invert to become a London Basin (Reading and Slough are on its northern rim) – an example of this folding is a (chalk) pericline thrust up through the surrounding Palaeogene deposits; Windsor Castle was built on it.

Pleistocene deposits of the Thames Valley.

The northern and western hills, and the valleys that surround them, were shaped by the rivers Kennet, Lambourn, Pang and Enborne, and the Quaternary sands and gravels they brought with them and (in the case of the Kennet) left behind when they changed course.

=== Central claylands ===
The early Eocene London Clay (Thames Group) generally becomes thinner as we proceed westwards, though bed thicknesses can vary considerably over short distances. Where rivers have cut through these beds, Lambeth Group layers are found (notably, the [Palaeocene] Reading Formation, used for brick-making since Roman times but now increasingly scarce in the area after which it was named).

=== South-eastern heaths ===
The heaths and woodland south and east of Bracknell are mostly covered by (Eocene) Bracklesham Group sands and clays, and Quaternary sands, silts and gravels. After the Thames broke through the Goring Gap, that river and its tributaries, the Loddon, Emm Brook, Blackwater and (to some extent) Wey shaped the geography of eastern Berkshire but have not yet eroded away its Eocene cover.

== See also ==
- Geology of Oxfordshire
- Quarries in Berkshire
