= Scremerston Formation =

- Stratigraphic range: Carboniferous
- Type: Formation
- Unit of: Farne Group

Location
- Coordinates: 55.2° N, 2.8° W
- Region: England
- Country: United Kingdom

The Scremerston Formation is a geologic formation in England. It preserves fossils dating back to the Carboniferous period.

It consists of layers of sandstone, siltstone, mudstone and coal, with occasional thin dolomite or limestone beds. Sandstones make up about 50% of the formation and are white, grey, brown or reddish brown, forming beds that are typically less than 15 m thick, but are known to reach 60m thick in places. The siltstones and mudstone layers are grey or brownish grey and non-calcareous. About 5% of the formation is made up of coal seams, which reach up to 1.5 m thick. The Scremerston Formation was formed by the actions of a large river delta as well as marine deposits. Evidence of the sedimentary layering is very evident along the cliffs at Cocklawburn beach near Scremerston, with plentiful marine fossils and pavement-like rock formations with wave-ripple cross-lamination.

== See also ==
- List of fossiliferous stratigraphic units in England
