= Wych Beds =

- Stratigraphic range: Silurian
- Type: Formation

Location
- Region: England
- Country: United Kingdom

The Wych Beds is a geologic formation in England. It preserves fossils dating back to the Silurian period.

== See also ==
- List of fossiliferous stratigraphic units in England
