= Westbury Shales =

Geological formation in England

- Stratigraphic range: Rhaetian; ~205–202 Ma
- Type: Formation

Lithology
- Primary: Shale

Location
- Coordinates: 51.8°N 2.4°W
- Approximate paleocoordinates: 36.3°N 0.8°E
- Region: England
- Country: United Kingdom
- Westbury Shales (the United Kingdom) Westbury Shales (England)

The Westbury Shales is a geologic formation in England. It preserves fossils of Holcoptera schlotheimi, Saurichthys acuminatus, Coleopteron sp. and Liassophlebia sp. dating back to the Rhaetian period.

== See also ==
- List of fossiliferous stratigraphic units in England
