= Skegness Clay =

- Stratigraphic range: Aptian; ~120–112 Ma
- Type: Formation

Location
- Region: England
- Country: United Kingdom

The Skegness Clay is a geologic formation in England. It preserves fossils dating back to the Cretaceous period.

== See also ==
- List of fossiliferous stratigraphic units in England
