= Carstone Formation =

Geological formation in England

- Stratigraphic range: Albian
- Type: Formation
- Underlies: Gault Formation, Hunstanton Formation
- Overlies: Various Paleozoic to Jurassic units
- Thickness: Generally about 5 m but up to 18.9 m

Lithology
- Primary: Sandstone
- Other: Conglomerate

Location
- Region: Europe
- Country: England
- Extent: Cambridgeshire, Lincolnshire, Norfolk

The Carstone Formation is a geological formation in England. It preserves fossils dating back to the Albian stage of the Cretaceous period. It predominantly consists of "greenish-brown (rusty when weathered), thick-bedded, cross-bedded, oolitic ferruginous sandstone".

== See also ==
- Carrstone
- List of fossiliferous stratigraphic units in England
