= Mammaliferous Crag Formation =

Geologic formation in England

- Type: Formation

Location
- Region: Norfolk
- Country: United Kingdom

The Mammaliferous Crag Formation is a geologic formation in England. It preserves fossils. It is located in Norfolk and extending into Suffolk, primarily around Norwich, with sections in Bramerton and Postwick with Witton.

== See also ==
- List of fossiliferous stratigraphic units in England
