= Grey Downtonian =

- Stratigraphic range: Mid-Downtonian (Lowermost Devonian)

The Grey Downtonian facies occurs in the Downton Castle Sandstone Group of the British Old Red Sandstone, and more or less straddles the Devonian-Silurian boundary. The Ludlow Bone Bed and Temeside Shales are sometimes also included in the Grey Downtonian, which is also referred to as the Temeside group, part of the Downton Series. It is intermediate between the marine flagstones beneath it and the terrestrial deposits above it. The beds were deposited in a marine environment, with some material being washed in from the nearby land.
