= Weston Flags Formation =

Geologic formation in England

- Stratigraphic range: Darriwilian
- Type: Geological formation
- Underlies: Betton Shale Formation
- Overlies: Stapeley Volcanic Formation and Hope Shale Formation

Location
- Region: England
- Country: United Kingdom

The Weston Flags Formation is a geological formation in Shropshire, England. It preserves fossils dating back to the Darriwilian stage of the Ordovician period.

== See also ==
- List of fossiliferous stratigraphic units in England
