= Bromsgrove Sandstone =

- Stratigraphic range: Anisian; ~247.2–242 Ma
- Type: Formation
- Unit of: Sherwood Sandstone Group

Lithology
- Primary: Sandstone
- Other: Shale, conglomerate, marl

Location
- Coordinates: 52.7°N 2.3°W
- Approximate paleocoordinates: 15.6°N 10.8°E
- Region: England
- Country: United Kingdom
- Bromsgrove Sandstone (the United Kingdom) Bromsgrove Sandstone (England)

The Bromsgrove Sandstone is a geologic formation of the Sherwood Sandstone Group in England. It preserves fossils and ichnofossils of Chirotherium barthii, and Chirotherium sickleri, dating back to the Middle Triassic (Anisian) period.

== Fossil content ==
- Bromsgroveia walkeri
- Bromsgroviscorpio willsi
- Ceratodus laevissimus
- Cyclotosaurus leptognathus, C. pachygnathus
- Langeronyx brodiei
- Mesophonus perornatus, M. pulcherrimus
- Palaeosaurus cylindrodon
- Rhombopholis scutulata
- Spongiophonus pustulosus
- Stenoscorpio gracilis, S. pseudogracilis
- Willsiscorpio bromsgroviensis
- Acrodus sp.
- Dipteronotus sp.
- ?Gyrolepis sp.
- Mastodonsaurus sp.
- Archosauria indet.
- Dinosauriformes indet.
- Nothosauria indet.
- Rhynchosauridae indet.

== See also ==
- List of fossiliferous stratigraphic units in England
