= Keuper Waterstones =

- Stratigraphic range: Anisian; ~247–242 Ma
- Type: Formation
- Unit of: Mercia Mudstone Group

Lithology
- Primary: Sandstone

Location
- Coordinates: 53.0°N 1.2°W
- Approximate paleocoordinates: 16.0°N 11.4°E
- Region: England
- Country: United Kingdom
- Keuper Waterstones (the United Kingdom) Keuper Waterstones (England)

The Keuper Waterstones is a geologic formation in England. It preserves ichnofossils of Varanopus aff. curvidactylus, Swinnertonichnus mapperleyensis, Deuterotetrapous plancus, Chirotherium swinnertoni, Microsauropus acutipes and Erpetopus willistoni dating back to the Middle Triassic (Anisian) period.

== See also ==
- List of fossiliferous stratigraphic units in England
