= Keisley Limestone =

- Stratigraphic range: Late Ordovician
- Type: Formation

Lithology
- Primary: Limestone

Location
- Region: England
- Country: United Kingdom

The Keisley Limestone is a geologic formation in England. It preserves fossils dating back to the Late Ordovician period.

== See also ==
- List of fossiliferous stratigraphic units in England
