= Ogof Hen Formation =

English geologic formation

- Stratigraphic range: Ordovician
- Type: Formation

Location
- Region: England
- Country: United Kingdom

The Ogof Hen Formation is a geological formation in England. It preserves fossils dating back to the Ordovician period.

== See also ==
- List of fossiliferous stratigraphic units in England
