= Infracombe Slates Group =

- Stratigraphic range: Devonian
- Type: Group

Lithology
- Primary: Slate

Location
- Region: England
- Country: United Kingdom

The Infracombe Slates Group is a geologic group in England. It preserves fossils dated to the Devonian period.

== See also ==
- List of fossiliferous stratigraphic units in England
