= Upper Greensand Formation =

Cretaceous geological formation

- Stratigraphic range: Albian–Cenomanian 113–94 Ma
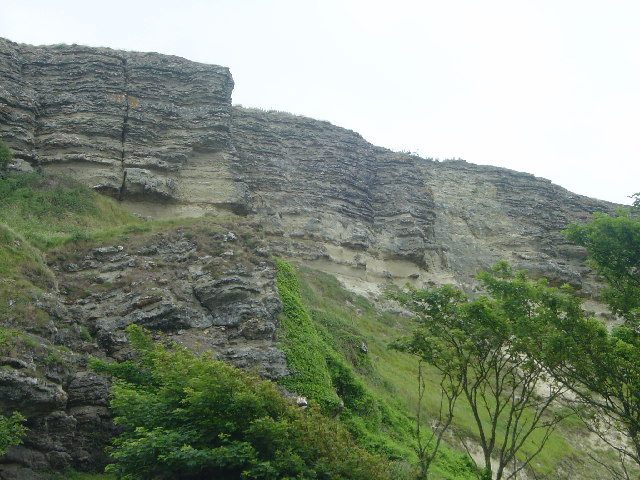
- Sandstones of the Upper Greensand Formation above Blackgang, Isle of Wight
- Type: Geological formation
- Unit of: Selborne Group
- Underlies: Chalk Group
- Overlies: Gault Clay
- Area: Wessex Basin, Weald Basin
- Thickness: 0–75 m

Lithology
- Primary: Sandstone
- Other: Siltstone

Location
- Country: England

The Upper Greensand Formation is a Cretaceous formation of Albian to Cenomanian in age, found within the Wessex Basin and parts of the Weald Basin in southern England. It overlies the Gault Clay and underlies the Chalk Group. It varies in thickness from zero to 75 m. It is predominantly a glauconitic fine-grained sandstone, locally becoming silty. Fragmentary dinosaur remains, such as those assigned to Iuticosaurus, have been recovered from this formation. It has been quarried as a building stone from Roman times, and used in London and the area of its outcrop from Devon to East Sussex.

== Use ==
Sandstones from the Upper Greensand have been used as building stone since at least Roman times. Reigate Stone was mined from the Upper Greensand in north east Surrey throughout the Middle Ages and early modern period, forming the most important source of freestone in Medieval London. In Dorset, the Shaftesbury Sandstone was quarried between Shaftesbury and Okeford Fitzpaine and used in the Shaftesbury area and along the Stour valley. In southeastern Devon, the Bindon Sandstone was quarried near Branscombe and used in buildings such as Exeter Cathedral. Other building stones quarried from the Upper Greensand in the county include Salcombe Stone from near the border with Somerset, and the Green Glauconitic Sandstone from the western side of the Blackdown Hills.

Hurdcott Stone was quarried in Wiltshire and used particularly in Mere and Shaftesbury. It is currently being produced from a quarry at Barford St Martin. Potterne Stone is quarried near Potterne and used there and in the Vale of Pewsey. On the Isle of Wight the Upper Greensand has been quarried since Roman times, including Ventnor Stone near Ventnor, with varieties Green Ventnor Stone and Ventnor Foxstone, and Bonchurch Stone only found at Bonchurch. Chert from the top of the formation has also been used as a building stone since the 17th century. In West Sussex and Hampshire, Malmstone was quarried and used in buildings such as Winchester Castle and Amberley Castle. In East Sussex, Eastbourne Sandstone was quarried from the foreshore at Eastbourne, and used in buildings in the town such as the church of St Mary the Virgin.
