= Knipescar Common =

Coordinates: 54°33′55″N 2°44′02″W

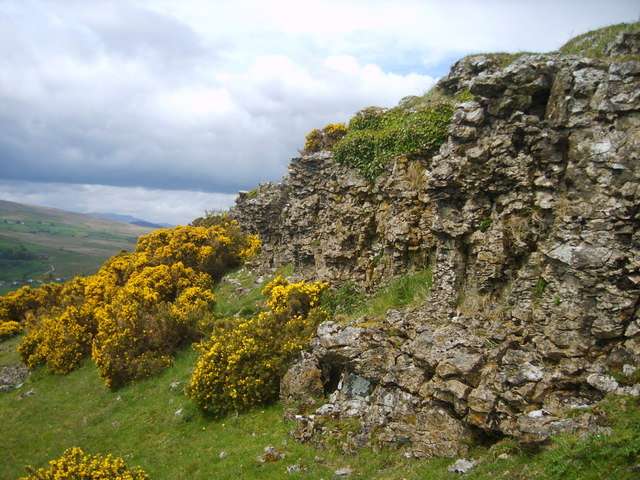
The limestone outcrop of Knipe Scar

Knipescar Common, or Knipe Scar, is an upland area in the east of the English Lake District, above the River Lowther, near Bampton, Cumbria. It is the subject of a chapter of Wainwright's book The Outlying Fells of Lakeland. The summit is "indefinite" but reaches 1,118 feet (341 m) and there are limestone outcrops and an ancient enclosure. Wainwright commends the views which include Blencathra to the north and "a continuous skyline of the higher Pennines."

Two ring cairns are scheduled monuments. The more northerly is the "ancient enclosure" described by Wainwright.

Immediately to the east of the southern part of Knipescar Common lies Shap Beck Quarry, an active limestone quarry.
