= Weybourne Crag Formation =

Geological formation in England

- Type: Formation
- Unit of: Crag Group

Location
- Region: England
- Country: United Kingdom

The Weybourne Crag Formation is a geologic formation in England. It preserves fossils.

== See also ==
- List of fossiliferous stratigraphic units in England
