= Dicranodonta =

Dicranodonta Temporal range: 155.7–100.5 Ma

Scientific classification
- Domain: Eukaryota
- Kingdom: Animalia
- Phylum: Mollusca
- Class: Bivalvia
- Order: Arcida
- Family: Cucullaeidae
- Genus: †Dicranodonta; Woods, 1899
- Species: †D. dowlingi

Binomial name
- †Dicranodonta dowlingi McLearn 1919

Extinct genus of bivalves

Dicranodonta is an extinct genus of bivalves from the Jurassic and Cretaceous.
