= Ledbury Formation =

Geologic formation in England

- Stratigraphic range: Silurian
- Type: Formation

Lithology
- Primary: Shale

Location
- Region: England
- Country: United Kingdom

The Ledbury Formation is a geologic formation in Herefordshire, England.

The shale formation preserves fossils dating back to the Silurian period.

== See also ==
- List of fossiliferous stratigraphic units in England
