= Sandringham Sandstone =

Geologic formation in Norfolk, England

- Stratigraphic range: Cretaceous
- Type: Formation

Location
- Region: Norfolk
- Country: England

The Sandringham Sandstone is a geologic formation in Norfolk, England. It preserves fossils dating back to the Cretaceous period.

== See also ==
- List of fossiliferous stratigraphic units in England
