= Corallian Group =

Geological formation in England

- Stratigraphic range: Oxfordian; ~163–153 Ma
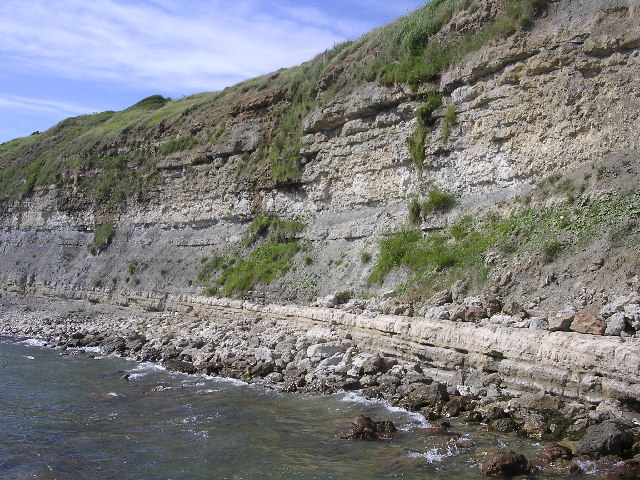
- Corallian strata exposed near Bran Point
- Type: Group
- Sub-units: Cleveland Basin - Lower Calcareous Grit Formation, Coralline Oolite Formation, Upper Calcareous Grit Formation; Dorset to Oxfordshire - Hazelbury Bryan Formation, Kingston Formation, Stanford Formation; Dorset to Wiltshire - Stour Formation, Clavellata Formation, Sandsfoot Formation
- Underlies: Kimmeridge Clay Formation, Ampthill Clay, Faringdon Sand
- Overlies: Oxford Clay Formation, West Walton Formation
- Thickness: 100 m (330 ft)

Lithology
- Primary: limestone, marl, sandstone, siltstone, mudstone.

Location
- Region: England
- Country: United Kingdom
- Extent: Dorset to Oxfordshire, North Yorkshire

The Corallian Group or Corallian Limestone is a geologic group in England. It is predominantly a coralliferous sedimentary rock, laid down in the Oxfordian stage of the Jurassic. It is a hard variety of "coral rag". Building stones from this geological structure tend to be irregular in shape. It is often found close to seams of Portland Limestone (e.g. Abbotsbury in Dorset, England). It is a younger limestone than its near-neighbour, the Oolitic, as found in the Cotswolds, in Gloucestershire. It is laterally equivalent to and interfingers with units of the Ancholme Group.

A ridge of Corallian Limestone rises above the Vale of Avon and the Thames Valley in its Oxfordshire stretch. The Oxfordshire Corallian ridge is an escarpment holding back the hanging valley that is the Vale of White Horse and its hardness forced the River Thames to take a wide northern detour, to cut through the low ridge at Oxford. High points along the ridge are Cumnor Hurst and Wytham Hill. The outcrop known as Headington stone was quarried at Headington Quarry on the outskirts of Oxford and used for many of the historic University buildings there.

Hilly outcrops above this corallian ridge, composed of Lower Greensand, occur at Badbury Hill, Faringdon (Folly Hill) and Boars Hill.

Softer sandy deposits occur within the Corallian, found for example at Faringdon, Shellingford and Hatford in Oxfordshire, where the sands and gravels are extensively quarried.

The Corallian Limestone aquifer is present at outcrop in Yorkshire and in the Cotswolds. In Yorkshire it consists of limestones and grits up to about 110 m thick, thinning to about 20 m towards the south of the region, where the limestones are progressively replaced by clay. It is typically well jointed and gives rise to numerous springs. Here it yields up to 15 L/sec. In the Cotswolds the aquifer is up to 40 m thick, give yields of 5 to 10 L/sec, with water quality becoming increasingly saline down dip as the aquifer becomes confined in the Wessex Basin.

In England, Corallian Limestone is to be found in Dorset, Wiltshire, Oxfordshire, Buckinghamshire, Cambridgeshire, Lincolnshire and Yorkshire.

The most noted scholar of the Corallian strata of England was the geologist W.J. Arkell (1904–1958).

== See also ==
- List of types of limestone
- List of fossiliferous stratigraphic units in England
