= Chillesford Clay =

Geological formation in England

- Type: Formation

Location
- Region: England
- Country: United Kingdom

The Chillesford Clay is a geologic formation in England dating to the Early Pleistocene Bramertonian stage. It preserves fossils.

== See also ==
- List of fossiliferous stratigraphic units in England
