= Ancistrodon =

Ancistrodon is a taxonomic synonym that may refer to any of the following genera:

- Agkistrodon, a.k.a. copperheads and moccasins, a group of venomous pitvipers found in Central and North America
- Deinagkistrodon, a monotypic genus containing the species D. acutus, a.k.a. the hundred-pace viper, found in Southeast Asia
- Gloydius, a.k.a. Asian moccasins, found in Asia
