= Chalk Marl =

Geologic formation in England

- Stratigraphic range: Cenomanian
- Type: Formation
- Unit of: Chalk Group

Location
- Region: England
- Country: United Kingdom

The Chalk Marl is a geological rock unit rock in south-east England. Consisting of mixed and layered chalk and marl, it preserves fossils dated to the Cretaceous period. The rocks were formed on the floor of a deep water basin. As of 2026, the Chalk Marl is an obsolete name in English stratigraphy and has been renamed as the West Melbury Marly Chalk Formation within the Chalk Group. Its lateral equivalent in south-west England is the thinner Beer Head Limestone Formation, which was deposited in a shallow sea shelf environment. Rocks similar in age and lithological properties, which are the French stratigraphical equivalent of the Chalk Marl, outcrop in northern France (as the Craie marneuse and lower part of the Craie de Rouen).

The Channel Tunnel was bored through Chalk Marl for its entire length.

== See also ==
- List of fossiliferous stratigraphic units in England
