= West Walton Formation =

- Stratigraphic range: Oxfordian
- Type: Geological formation
- Unit of: Ancholme Group
- Underlies: Ampthill Clay, Corallian Group
- Overlies: Oxford Clay
- Thickness: 0 to 20 m, typically about 15 m

Lithology
- Primary: Mudstone, Siltstone
- Other: Sandstone, Limestone

Location
- Region: England
- Country: United Kingdom

Type section
- Named for: West Walton
- Location: West Walton Highway Borehole 3c (TF41SE/6)
- Thickness at type section: 14.06 m

The West Walton Formation is a geologic formation in England. It preserves fossils dating back to the Jurassic period .
