= Coralline Oolite Formation =

Geological formation in North Yorkshire, England

- Stratigraphic range: Oxfordian; ~163–158 Ma
- Type: Formation
- Unit of: Corallian Group
- Sub-units: Coral Rag, Yedmandale, Hambleton Oolite, Malton Oolite, Birdsall Calcareous Grit, Middle Calcareous Grit & Hildenley Limestone Members
- Underlies: Upper Calcareous Grit, Ampthill Clay & Hunstanton Formations
- Overlies: Lower Calcareous Grit Formation & Oxford Clay
- Thickness: 36–60 m (118–197 ft)

Lithology
- Primary: Limestone
- Other: Sandstone

Location
- Region: North Yorkshire
- Country: England
- Extent: Cleveland Basin

Type section
- Location: Filey Brigg, Filey

The Coralline Oolite Formation is a limestone formation of Oxfordian (Upper Jurassic) age, found in the Cleveland Basin of North Yorkshire, England.

== Coral Rag Member ==
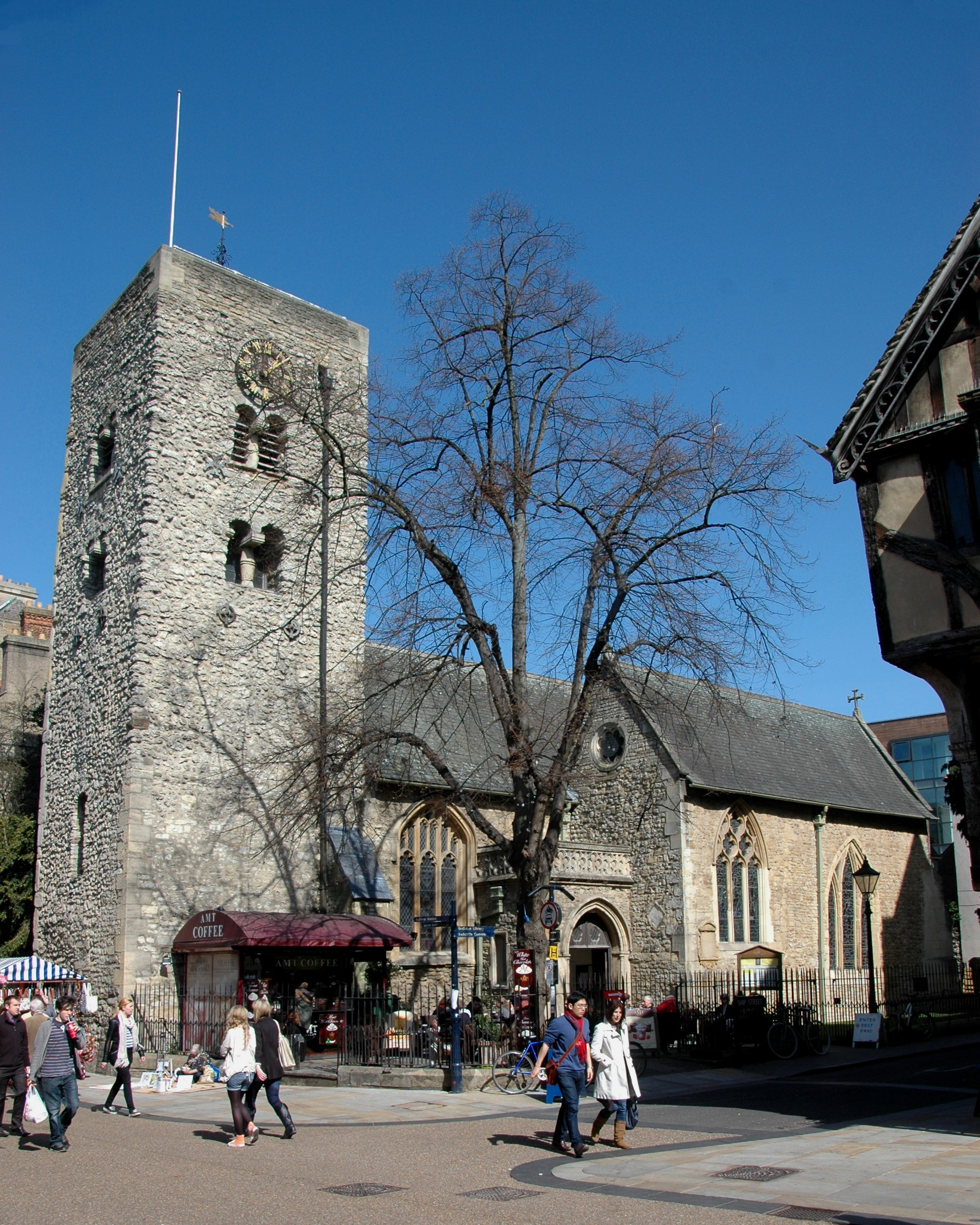
Coral Rag as building stone: the Saxon tower of St Michael at the Northgate, Oxford

The rock forms some of the hills around Oxford and was once used as building stone. Coral rag can be seen in some of the oldest buildings in that city, including the Saxon tower of St Michael at the Northgate, St George's Tower of Oxford Castle and the mediaeval walls of the city.

== Hambleton Oolite Member ==
This ooidal limestone lies above either the Yedmandale Member or the Lower Calcareous Grit Formation. It is overlain by either the Middle Calcareous Grit or Malton Oolite Members. It is distinguished from the latter by its smaller grain-size and poorer sorting.

== Vertebrate paleofauna ==
=== Dinosaurs ===
The following dinosaurs were reported from the formation, with many of them reidentified.

Taxa	Location	Description	Images
Dinosauria; 1. Undescribed dinosaur genus.	Berkshire, England		
Metriacanthosaurus: 1. M. parkeri	misidentified	Actually from the Weymouth Member.	
Sauropoda: 1. Indeterminate remains.	Oxfordshire, England	"(=Cetiosaurus sp.)"	
Stegosauridae: 1. Indeterminate remains.	North Yorkshire, England.	"(=Omosaurus phillipsi)" "Juvenile femur."	
Theropoda: 1. Indeterminate remains.; 2. Indeterminate remains.; 3. Possible indeterminate theropod remains.	North Yorkshire & Oxfordshire, England	"(=Megalosaurus bucklandii)": 1. "(=Megalosaurus sp.)" 2. "(=?Cryptodraco sp.)"	
