= Gault =

Geological formation in England

Gault Formation
- Stratigraphic range: Albian 112–100 Ma
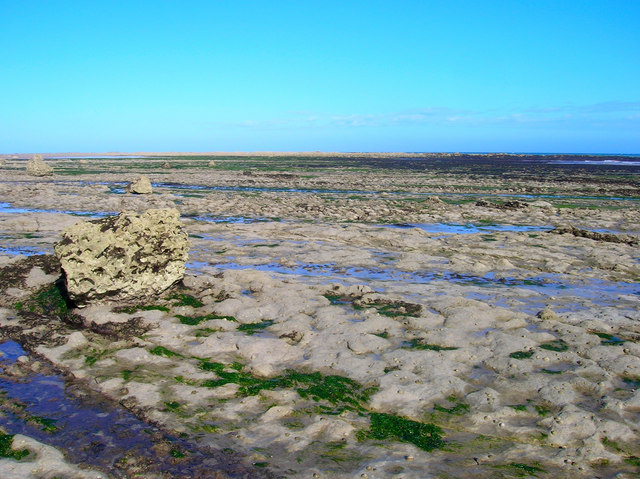
- An exposed surface of Gault clay on the foreshore near Beachy Head, East Sussex
- Type: Geological formation
- Unit of: Selborne Group
- Underlies: Upper Greensand Formation, Cambridge Greensand, Chalk Group
- Overlies: Monk's Bay Sandstone Formation, Folkestone Formation, Woburn Sands Formation, Carstone Formation, overstepping of Jurassic and Triassic rocks in Southern England
- Thickness: 2 m in Norfolk to 110 m in the Weald

Lithology
- Primary: Mudstone, clay
- Other: Limestone

Location
- Region: Southern England
- Country: England

Type section
- Location: Copt Point, Folkestone

The Gault Formation is a geological formation of stiff blue clay deposited in a calm, fairly deep-water marine environment during the Lower Cretaceous Period (Upper and Middle Albian). It is well exposed in the coastal cliffs at Copt Point in Folkestone, Kent, England, where it overlays the Lower Greensand formation, and underlies the Upper Greensand Formation. These represent different facies, with the sandier parts probably being deposited close to the shore and the clay in quieter water further from the source of sediment; both are believed to be shallow-water deposits.

The etymology of the name is uncertain and probably of local origin.

== Distribution ==
It is found in exposure on the south side of the North Downs and the north side of the South Downs. It is also to be found beneath the scarp of the Berkshire Downs, in the Vale of White Horse, in Oxfordshire, England, and on the Isle of Wight where it is known as Blue Slipper. Gault underlies the chalk beneath the London Basin, generally overlying eroded rocks of Jurassic and Devonian age; lower gault is present only below the outer parts of the basin and is absent under central London. The Gault Formation represents a marine transgression following erosion of the Lower Greensand. It is subdivided into two sections, the Upper Gault and the Lower Gault. The Upper Gault onlaps onto the Lower Gault. The Gault Formation thins across the London Platform and then terminates against the Red Chalk just to the south of The Wash in East Anglia.

The Gault exposure at Copt Point, which is the type locality for the formation, is 40 m in thickness.

== Uses ==
The clay has been used in several locations for making bricks, notably near Dunton Green and near Wye in Kent.

Gault often contains numerous phosphatic nodules, some thought to be coprolites, and may also contain sand as well as small grains of the mineral glauconite. Crystals of the mineral selenite are fairly common in places, as are nodules of pyrite.

== Fossils ==
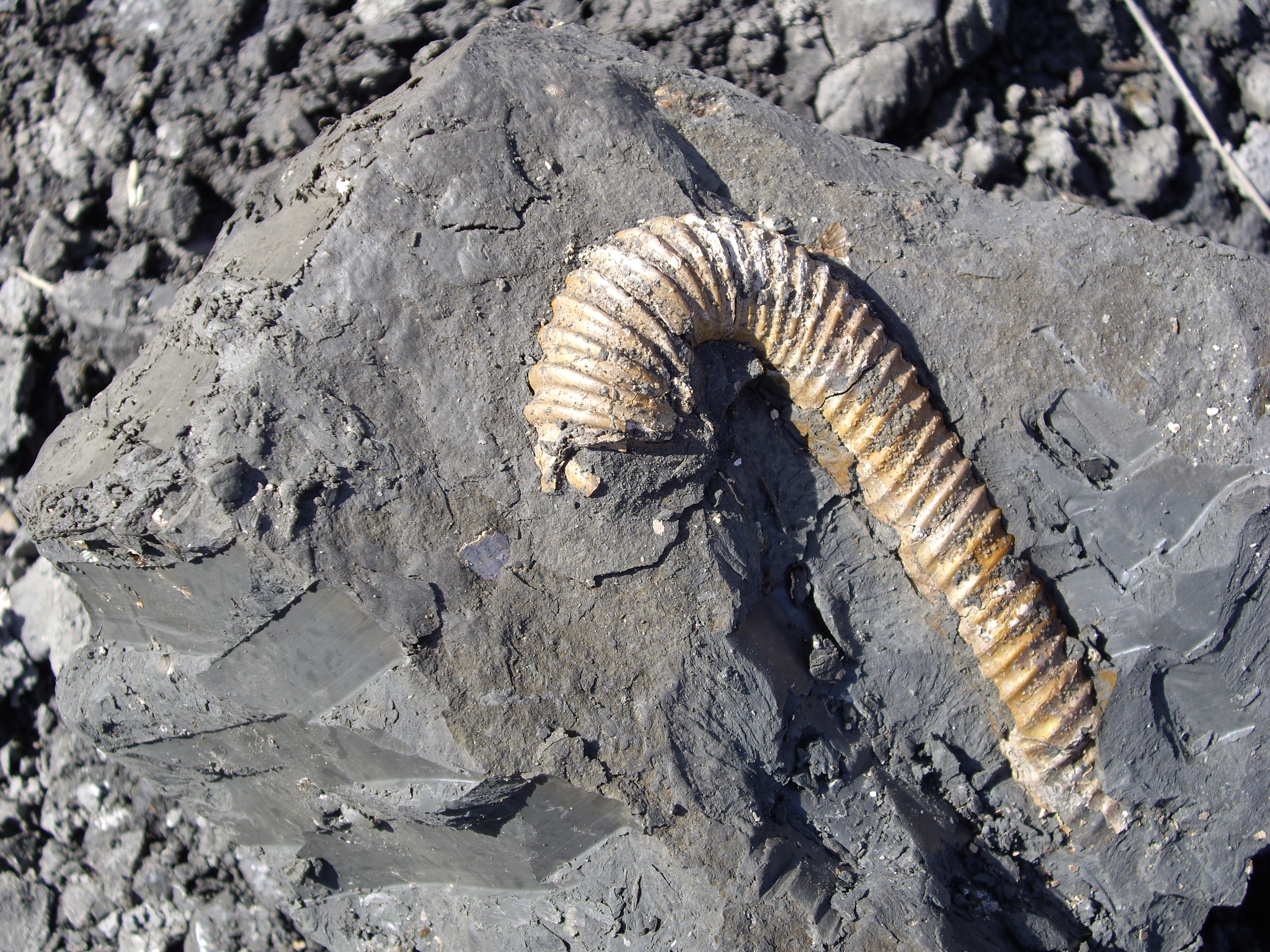
Hamitidae fossil in Gault Clay on a beach in Folkestone, Kent

Gault yields abundant marine fossils, including ammonites (such as Hoplites, Hamites, Euhoplites, Anahoplites, and Dimorphoplites), belemnites (such as Neohibolites), bivalves (such as Birostrina and Pectinucula), gastropods (such as Anchura), solitary corals, fish remains (including shark teeth), scattered crinoid remains, and crustaceans (such as the crab Notopocorystes). Terrestrial fossils that have been found at Gault include fossil wood, a dinosaur (cf. Acanthopholis), and pterosaurs, including azhdarchoids, ornithocheirids, and the indeterminate pterodactyloid "Pterodactylus" daviesii. Several pterosaur fossil remains from the overlying Cambridge Greensand may have been reworked from the underlying Gault.

== See also ==
- Argiles du Gault
