= Ampthill Clay =

Mesozoic geologic formation in England

- Stratigraphic range: Oxfordian, 161.2–155.7 Ma
- Type: Geological formation
- Unit of: Ancholme Group
- Underlies: Kimmeridge Clay
- Overlies: West Walton Formation or Corallian Group
- Thickness: 0-90 m

Lithology
- Primary: Mudstone
- Other: Limestone, Marl

Location
- Region: England
- Country: United Kingdom

The Ampthill Clay is a Mesozoic geological formation in southern England. Dinosaur remains diagnostic to the genus level are among the fossils that have been recovered from the formation.

== Vertebrate paleofauna ==
- Cryptosaurus eumerus "Femur."

== See also ==
- List of dinosaur-bearing rock formations
  - List of stratigraphic units with few dinosaur genera
