= Geology of Kent =

Geology in England

This article describes the geology of the ceremonial county of Kent. It includes the borough of Medway.

The geology of Kent in southeast England largely consists of a succession of northward dipping late Mesozoic and Cenozoic sedimentary rocks overlain by a suite of unconsolidated deposits of more recent origin.

== Overview ==
Geological cross section of Kent, showing how it relates to major towns

Kent is the south-easternmost county in England. It is bounded on the north by the River Thames and the North Sea, and on the south by the Straits of Dover and the English Channel. The continent of Europe is a mere 21 miles across the Strait.

The major geographical features of the county are determined by a series of ridges running from west to east across the county. These ridges are the remains of the Wealden dome, a denuded anticline across Kent, Surrey and Sussex, which was the result of uplifting caused by the Alpine movements between 10 and 20 million years ago. The dome was formed of an upper layer of Chalk above subsequent layers of Upper Greensand, Gault, Lower Greensand, Weald Clay and the Hastings Beds. The top of the dome eventually eroded away through weathering and ridges and valleys resulted across Kent and Sussex due to the exposed clay eroding at a faster rate than the exposed chalk, greensand and red sandstone and normal sandstone. The following ridges and the valleys have formed across Kent, listed from north to south:

- the low lying London Clay marshlands along the Thames/Medway estuaries and along the North Kent coast;
- the chalk North Downs, containing the highest point of the county, Betsom's Hill, at 251m/823 ft.
- the Vale of Holmesdale formed from Gault Clay overlaid in the north with the upper layer greensand;
- the Greensand Ridge, formed from the lower layer of greensand, containing the source of the River Medway and its tributaries;
- the Low Weald, a Weald Clay valley
- the sandstone High Weald.

The chalk comes in three layers: the upper layer, about 500 feet thick, is a pure white limestone bedded and jointed with localised masses of flint (ideal for cement); the middle layer, about 170 feet thick, is a compact white chalk occasionally hard enough for building; the lower layer, about 170 feet thick, is a greyish marly chalk. Dartford, Gravesend, The Medway Towns, Sittingbourne, Faversham, Canterbury, Deal and Dover are built on chalk.

The eastern part of the Wealden dome was eroded away by the sea. The White cliffs of Dover occur where the North Downs meets the coast. From there to Westerham is now the Kent Downs Area of Outstanding Natural Beauty. The chalk displays all its characteristic features such as steep sided dry valleys, and sunken roads.

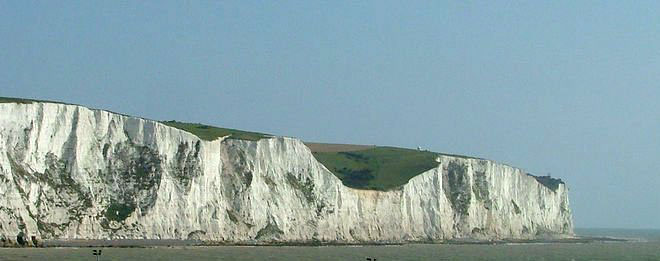
'The White Cliffs of Dover'

Greensand is a calcareous sandstone containing an uneven distribution of the mineral glauconite, giving the sandstone a greenish tinge. On exposure to the air this oxidises into a yellow stain. Sevenoaks, Maidstone, Ashford, and Folkestone are built on the greensand. Greensand comes in four layers: the Folkestone Beds 60–250 ft thick; The Sandgate Beds 5–120 ft thick; the Hythe beds 60–350 ft thick and Atherfield Clays 15–50 ft thick. The soil of the greensand is quite varied, ranging from fertile to fairly sterile. On the fertile soils we see chestnut and stands of hazel and oak, while Scots Pine and Birch colonise the poorer soils.

The Hastings Beds, which are resistant to weathering, leading to outcrops, such as High Rocks Tunbridge Wells, and sterile soil only suited to heathland and forests of Scots Pine. The Hastings Beds are divided into three formations: Tunbridge Wells Sand Formation 130–400 ft; Wadhurst Clay Formation 100–230 ft, shales with bands of sandstone and iron ore; and the Ashdown Formation 160–700 ft; sandstones. The Fairlight Clays form the upper part of the Ashdown Formation; grey and variegated shales. Tonbridge and Tunbridge Wells are built on the Hastings Beds.

The Weald derives its ancient name from the Germanic word wald meaning simply woodland. Much of the area remains today densely wooded; where there are also heavy clays the tracks through are nearly impassable for much of the year.

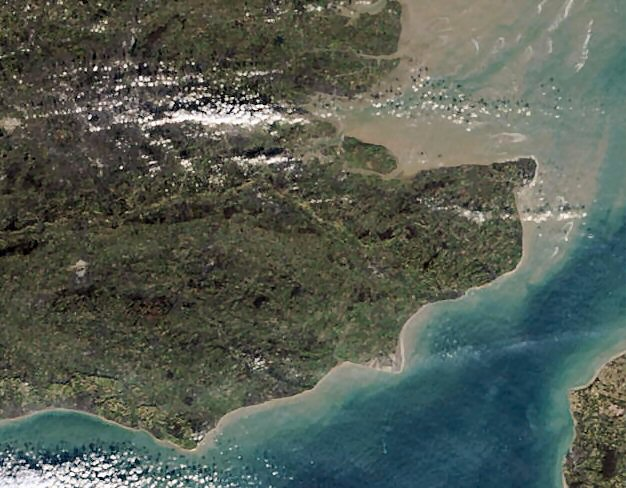
South-east England viewed from a NASA satellite September 2005

The Wealden dome is a Mesozoic structure lying on a Palaeozoic foundation, which usually creates the right conditions for coal formation. This is found in East Kent, roughly between Deal, Canterbury, and Dover. The coal measures within the Westphalian Sandstone are deep (below 244m - 396m) and subject to flooding. They occur in two major troughs, which extend under the English Channel where similar coalfields are sited.

Seismic activity has occasionally been recorded in Kent, though the epicentre is offshore. In 1382 and 1580 there were two earthquakes exceeding 6.0 on the Richter Scale. In 1776, 1950, and 28 April 2007 there were earthquakes of around 4.3. The 2007 earthquake caused physical damage in Folkestone.

The coastline of Kent is continually changing, due to uplift, sedimentation, and marine erosion. The Isle of Thanet was till recently (AD 960) an island, formed around a deposit of chalk. The channels silted up with alluvium. Similarly Romney Marsh and Dungeness have been formed by accumulation of alluvium.

Kent's principal river, the River Medway, rises near Edenbridge and flows some 25 miles (40 km) eastwards to a point near Maidstone, when it turns north. Here it breaks through the North Downs at Rochester before joining the River Thames as its final tributary near Sheerness. The river is tidal as far as Allington lock, but in earlier times cargo-carrying vessels reached as far upstream as Tonbridge. The Medway has captured the head waters of other rivers such as the River Darent. There are other rivers in Kent, most notably the River Stour in the east.

== Silurian and Devonian ==
Rocks of this age are encountered at great depth in boreholes but are not exposed at the surface.

== Carboniferous ==
The Kent Coalfield is a concealed coalfield working the Coal Measures at depth. These rocks are nowhere exposed at the surface but considerable detail is known from boreholes and underground workings for coal. A number of coal seams were worked in the past from the upper, middle and lower Coal Measures. Fourteen seams are named sequentially downwards as Kent No 1, Kent no 2 etc. The Lower Coal Measures lie unconformably on Carboniferous Limestone.

== Triassic and Jurassic ==
Rocks of this age are encountered in boreholes but are not exposed at the surface. The Jurassic succession detected reflects that exposed at the surface further west in southern England.

== Cretaceous ==
The oldest rocks to appear at the surface in Kent are the mudstones, limestones, siltstones and sandstones of the Wealden Group which underpin the wooded landscape of The Weald. These are in turn overlain by the sandstones of the Lower Greensand Group, the Upper Greenstone Formation and the mudstone of the Gault. The Grey Chalk Subgroup and finally the White Chalk Subgroup overlie these and form the North Downs which run from the famous White Cliffs at Dover west-northwestwards above Ashford and Maidstone before turning slightly south of west at the Medway gap towards Sevenoaks. The succession can be listed with modern stratigraphic terminology thus:

- Chalk Group
  - White Chalk Subgroup
  - Grey Chalk Subgroup
- Upper Greensand Formation
- Gault Formation
- Lower Greensand Group (Aptian age)
  - Folkestone Beds
  - Sandgate Beds
  - Hythe Beds
  - Atherfield Clay
- Wealden Group
  - Weald Clay Formation (Hauterivian to Barremian age)
  - Tunbridge Wells Sand Formation (Valanginian age)
  - Wadhurst Clay Formation (Valanginian age)
  - Ashdown Formation

Note that the lowermost three units were formerly known by the names 'Ashdown Beds', 'Wadhurst Clay' and 'Tunbridge Wells Sand' and together constituted the 'Hastings Beds', a name no longer formally recognised by geologists but nevertheless common in the literature. The old name 'Wealden Series' includes the 'Hastings Beds' and overlying 'Weald Clay Formation'.

== Palaeogene ==
Unconformably overlying the Chalk are a succession of sands and clays of Palaeocene and Eocene age. The Thanet Formation is the oldest of these and occupies an area from the coast near Sandwich east through Canterbury to Sittingbourne, Rochester and, intermittently, to Dartford. North of this outcrop, and stratigraphically above it, is a thinner band of pebbly, shelly sands and clays ascribed to the Lambeth Group. North again and following the Thames Estuary coast is the Eocene age silty and sandy clay of the London Clay Formation. It underlies Herne Bay, Whitstable and the Isle of Sheppey. The youngest Palaeogene strata is a patch of late Eocene sand, silt and clay around Eastchurch and Minster on the Isle of Sheppey. The succession in Sheppey can be listed with modern stratigraphic terminology thus:

- London Clay Formation
- Harwich Formation
- Lambeth Group
  - Upnor Formation
- Thanet Formation

== Neogene ==
The Miocene/Pliocene age Lenham Formation occurs in a few small pockets around the village of Lenham between Ashford and Maidstone.

== Structure ==
Kent straddles the northern limb of a regional scale upfold of strata known as the Weald-Artois Anticline which extends westwards as far as Hampshire and east across the English Channel into northern France. The fold arises from the continuing Alpine orogeny and results in the general northward dip of the rock strata in most of Kent.

== Quaternary ==
There are extensive spreads of coastal and estuarine alluvium on the Thames Estuary coast, in the low ground surrounding the Isle of Thanet and across Romney Marsh. Alluvium also floors the valleys of the River Medway and Stour. 'Clay-with-flints' is a commonly occurring deposit across the North Downs which is a product of periglacial conditions during the last ice age. Loessic deposits, of Aeolian origin, i.e., windblown, are common in east Kent, especially on the northern slopes of the Downs where they are known as brickearths. Landslips are known along the north coast of the Isle of Sheppey, the coast near Reculver and either side of Folkestone and indeed the former coastline west of Folkestone overlooking Romney Marsh.

== See also ==
- Geology of the United Kingdom
- Geology of England
