= Geography of Kent =

Geological cross section of Kent, showing how it relates to major towns

Kent is the south-easternmost county in England. It is bounded on the north by the River Thames and the North Sea, and on the south by the Straits of Dover and the English Channel. The continent of Europe is 21 miles across the straits.

== Geology ==
The major geographical features of the county are determined by a series of ridges running from west to east across the county. These ridges are the remains of the Wealden dome, a denuded anticline across Kent, Surrey and Sussex, which was the result of uplifting caused by the Alpine movements between 10-20 million years ago. The dome was formed of an upper layer of Chalk above subsequent layers of Upper Greensand, Gault, Lower Greensand, Weald Clay and the Hastings Beds. The top of the dome eventually eroded away through weathering and ridges and valleys resulted across Kent and Sussex due to the exposed clay eroding at a faster rate than the exposed chalk, greensand and red sandstone and normal sandstone. The following ridges and the valleys have formed across Kent, listed from north to south:

- the low lying London Clay marshlands along the Thames/Medway estuaries and along the North Kent coast;
- the chalk North Downs, containing the highest point of the county, Betsom's Hill, at 251 m (823 ft);
- the Vale of Holmesdale formed from Gault Clay overlaid in the north with the upper layer greensand;
- the Greensand Ridge, formed from the lower layer of greensand, containing the source of the River Medway and its tributaries;
- the Low Weald, a Weald Clay valley
- the sandstone High Weald.

The chalk comes in three layers: the upper layer, about 500 feet thick, is a pure white limestone bedded and jointed with localised masses of flint (ideal for cement); the middle layer, about 170 feet thick, is a compact white chalk occasionally hard enough for building; the lower layer, about 170 feet thick, is a greyish marly chalk. Dartford, Gravesend, The Medway Towns, Sittingbourne, Faversham, Canterbury, Deal and Dover are built on chalk.

The eastern part of the Wealden dome was eroded away by the sea. The White cliffs of Dover occur where the North Downs meets the coast. From there to Westerham is now the Kent Downs Area of Outstanding Natural Beauty. The chalk displays all its characteristic features such as steep sided dry valleys, and sunken roads.

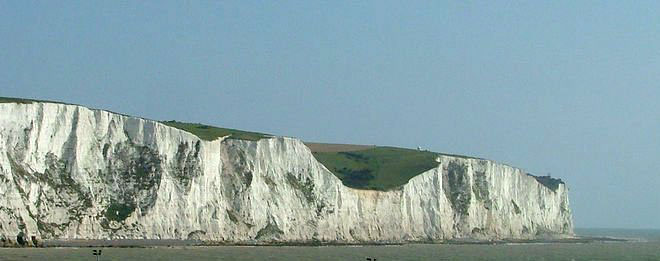
'The White Cliffs of Dover'

Greensand is a calcareous sandstone containing an uneven distribution of the mineral glauconite, giving the sandstone a greenish tinge. On exposure to the air this oxidises into a yellow stain. Sevenoaks, Maidstone, Ashford, and Folkestone are built on the greensand. Greensand comes in four layers: the Folkestone Beds 60–250 ft thick; The Sandgate Beds 5–120 ft thick; the Hythe beds 60–350 ft thick and Atherfield Clays 15–50 ft thick. The soil of the greensand is quite varied, ranging from fertile to fairly sterile. On the fertile soils we see chestnut and stands of hazel and oak, while Scots Pine and Birch colonise the poorer soils.

The Hastings Beds, which are resistant to weathering, leading to outcrops, such as High Rocks Tunbridge Wells, and sterile soil only suited to heathland and forests of Scots Pine. The Hastings Beds are divided into three formations: Tunbridge Wells Sand Formation 130–400 ft; Wadhurst Clay Formation 100–230 ft, shales with bands of sandstone and iron ore; and the Ashdown Formation 160–700 ft; sandstones. The Fairlight Clays form the upper part of the Ashdown Formation; grey and variegated shales. Tonbridge and Tunbridge Wells are built on the Hastings Beds.

The Weald derives its ancient name from the Germanic word wald meaning simply woodland. Much of the area remains today densely wooded; where there are also heavy clays the tracks through are nearly impassable for much of the year.

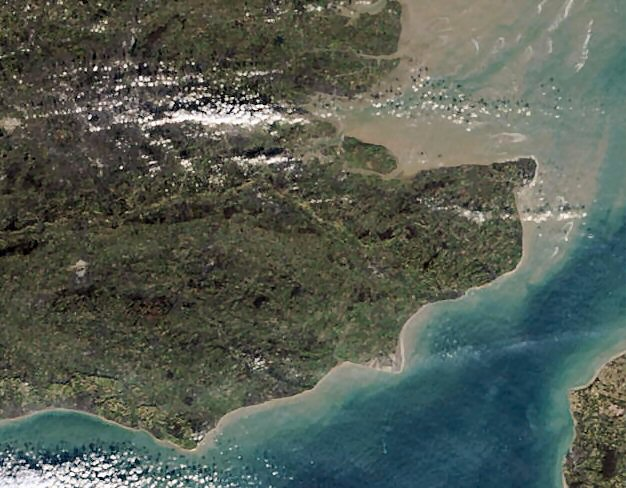
South-east England viewed from a NASA satellite September 2005

The Wealden dome is a Mesozoic structure lying on a Palaeozoic foundation, which usually creates the right conditions for coal formation. This is found in East Kent, roughly between Deal, Canterbury, and Dover. The coal measures within the Westphalian Sandstone are deep (below 244m - 396m) and subject to flooding. They occur in two major troughs, which extend under the English Channel where similar coalfields are sited.

Seismic activity has occasionally been recorded in Kent, though the epicentre is offshore. In 1382 and 1580 there were two earthquakes exceeding 6.0 on the Richter Scale. In 1776, 1950, and 28 April 2007 there were earthquakes of around 4.3. The 2007 earthquake caused physical damage in Folkestone.

== Water ==
The coastline of Kent is continually changing, due to uplift, sedimentation, and marine erosion. The Isle of Thanet was originally an island, formed around a deposit of chalk. The channels silted up with alluvium. Similarly Romney Marsh and Dungeness have been formed by accumulation of alluvium.

Kent's principal river, the River Medway, rises near Edenbridge and flows some 25 miles (40 km) eastwards to a point near Maidstone, when it turns north. Here it breaks through the North Downs at Rochester before joining the River Thames as its final tributary near Sheerness. The river is tidal as far as Allington lock, but in earlier times cargo-carrying vessels reached as far upstream as Tonbridge. The Medway has captured the head waters of other rivers such as the River Darent. There are other rivers in Kent, most notably the River Stour in the east.

== Flora and fauna ==
The wide range of habitats in the area gives the county a rich variety of Kent's plant and animal species. These habitats are the consequence of a combination of several different factors including climate, geology, relief and land use.

A number of organisations exist in the county to help conserve the landscape and wildlife which lives within it. More than 60 nature reserves are managed by Kent Wildlife Trust. Kent houses a significant number of internationally important sites, including Special Protection Areas, Ramsar wetlands, Special Areas of Conservation, Sites of Special Scientific Interest, national nature reserves, Environmentally Sensitive Areas, local wildlife sites, roadside nature reserves, and Areas of Outstanding Natural Beauty.

Kent Wildlife Trust manages the Local Wildlife Sites system in Kent, and manages over 60 wildlife reserves over the county of Kent. Access is free and visitor centres provide educational programmes to children and adults alike.
