= Harrison's Rocks =

Sandstone crag in England

Coordinates: 51.098344°N 0.186580°E

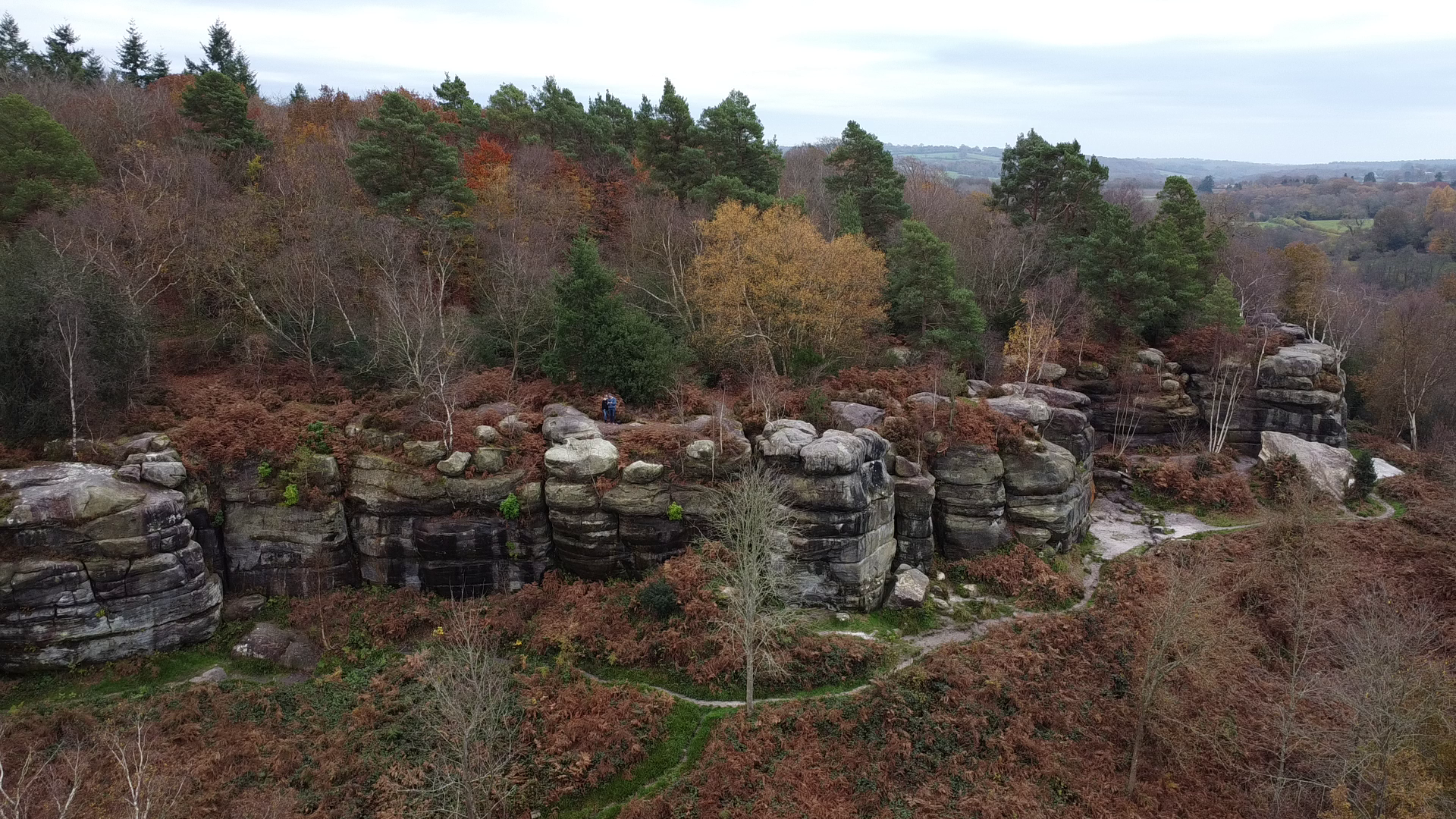
Aerial view of Harrison's Rocks

Harrison's Rocks is a series of sandstone crags approximately 1.5 kilometres (1 mi) south of the village of Groombridge in the county of East Sussex. The site is a notable example of a periglacial tor landform developed in rocks of the Ardingly Sandstone Member of the Tunbridge Wells Sand Formation. It is popular with rock climbers, and is the largest of the cluster of local outcrops known by climbers as Southern Sandstone.

Harrison's Rocks is owned by climbers and is managed on their behalf by the British Mountaineering Council with funding from the English Sports Council.

== Geology ==
Harrison's Rocks are a notable example of a periglacial tor landform, developed in rocks of the Tunbridge Wells Sand Formation of the Wealden Supergroup of early Cretaceous age. Harrison's Rocks is composed of a soft sandstone, which is prone to being worn away.

== Climbing ==
Harrison's Rocks has been owned by the British Mountaineering Council since 2009, and is managed by a local group of volunteers known as the Harrison's Rocks Management Group.

There are approximately four hundred short climbs at Harrison's Rocks, ranging widely in difficulty. Climbing is exclusively protected by means of a "top rope". This is the same as at all Southern Sandstone outcrops. Lead-climbing is prohibited for two main reasons. Firstly, it is dangerous because the rock is too friable; any gear placed in the sandstone cracks would easily rip out in the event of a leader fall. Lead-climbing is also discouraged for reasons of conservation - it is unacceptable for climbers to risk further damage to the thin rock crust on the surface of the crags. Unconsolidated and friable sand lies beneath this crust. Deep rope-grooves can be seen in places at Harrison's Rocks and are testament to the fragility of the rock.

All of the climbs are quite short, with the highest at approximately 30 feet (9 m) and the lowest at 15 feet (5 m). Most climbs have a ring drilled and set into the rock at the top for setting up a top rope, but some rely on the use of tree trunks for protection.

== Filming ==
In 1981, Doctor Who was filmed at Harrison's Rocks. It was Peter Davison's first transmitted story, Castrovalva (Doctor Who).

In June 1968, the earlier episode The Mind Robber starting Patrick Troughton was filmed here.

== Campsite ==
A campsite was set up at Harrison's Rocks as a memorial to Julie Tullis, a former club member, who died on K2 in August 1986 after reaching the summit with Kurt Diemberger. The campground is owned and looked after by the Forestry Commission.

== See also ==
Geology of East Sussex
