= Southern Sandstone =

Rock formation in southeast England

Coordinates: 51.0°N 0.2°E

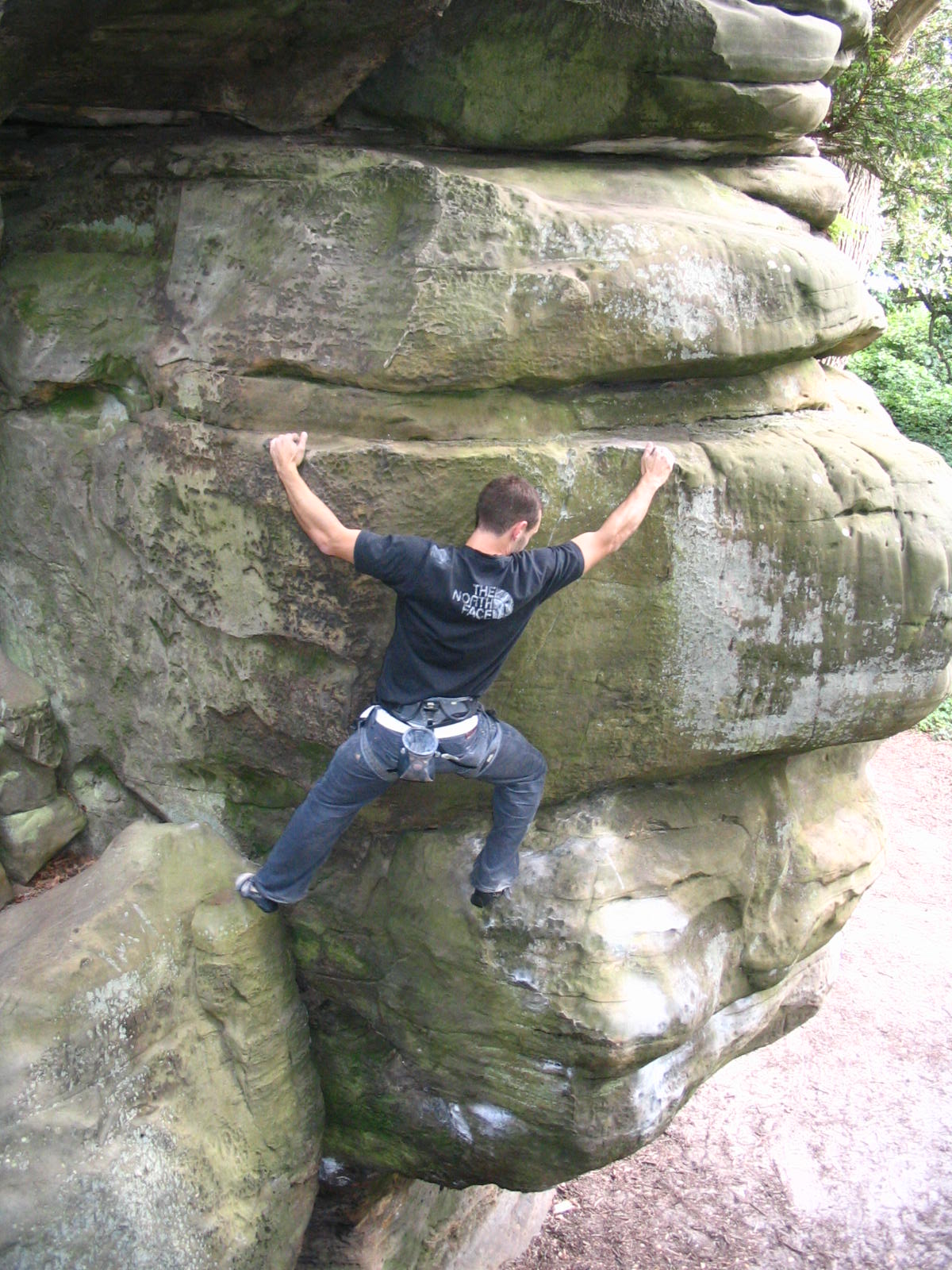
Steps and rocks at High Rocks outside Tunbridge Wells

Southern Sandstone is a local name for the Ardingly Sandstone of southeast England, a soft sandstone of Cretaceous age separating the Tunbridge Wells Sands from the overlying Grinstead Clay. The outcrops in the Weald of Kent are the rock climbing crags closest to London and are probably the most heavily climbed in the UK.

== Geology ==
The horizon of thick, cross-bedded, fine-to-medium grained quartz sandstone separating the Tunbridge Wells Sands from the overlying Grinstead Clay is known as Ardingly Sandstone. It is particularly well exposed throughout the region between East Grinstead, West Sussex, and Tunbridge Wells, Kent.

== Climbing ==
Stone Farm and Harrisons Rocks are managed by the British Mountaineering Council (BMC). The rock is particularly soft and care needs to be taken to prevent erosion. It is climbed either solo or on a top-rope. Many bolts have been placed at the top of the crags. Soloing requires no more equipment than bouldering.

== Locations ==
Southern Sandstone is outcrops of sandstone situated in the Weald of Kent, on the borders of Kent and East Sussex.

=== Major Outcrops ===
- Bowles Rocks, Harrisons Rocks, High Rocks, High Rocks Continuation Wall and High Rocks Annexe near Crowborough
- Bull's Hollow Rocks west of Tunbridge Wells
- Chiddinglye Rocks near West Hoathly
- Eridge Green Rocks in Eridge Green, four miles south of Tunbridge Well
- Stone Farm Rocks south of East Grinstead

=== Minor Outcrops ===
- Basset's Farm Rocks, near Cowden
- Chiddinglye Wood Rocks near West Hoathly
- Happy Valley Rocks west of Tunbridge Wells
- Ramslye Farm Rocks, south of High Rocks
- Jockey's Wood Rocks, Penn's House Rocks, and Rocks Wood are in Penn's Rocks near Eridge. This is an SSI and climbing is not allowed.
- Under Rockes, south of Rotherfield
