= Stone Farm Rocks =

Coordinates: 51.095°N 0.031°W

Stone Hill Rocks
- Site of Special Scientific Interest
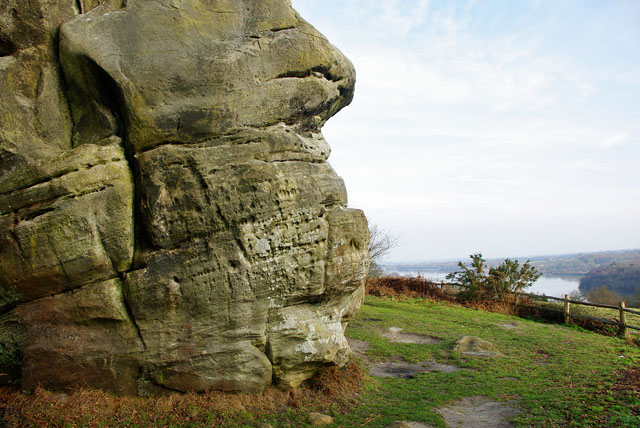
- Location of Stone Hill Rocks.
- Area of search: West Sussex
- Grid reference: TQ 380 347
- Interest: Geological
- Area: 0.6 hectares (1.5 acres)
- Notification date: 1990
- Location map: [ Magic Map]

Stone Farm Rocks or Stone Hill Rocks is a 0.6-hectare (1.5-acre) geological Site of Special Scientific Interest south of East Grinstead in West Sussex. It is a Geological Conservation Review site.

This is typical of many sandstone crags in mid-Sussex which expose the Tunbridge Wells Sand Formation, part of the Wealden Group which dates to the Early Cretaceous between 140 and 100 million years ago. It displays a variety of sedimentary structures in three dimensions and is described by Natural England as "an important site for the study and interpretation of sedimentary structures in the upper Lower Tunbridge Wells Sand".

The site has been owned by the British Mountaineering Council since 2001, who run it for the benefit of climbers. There are 74 identified climbs on the rocks. Bolt belays have been installed at the top of many of the climbs to reduce erosion of the site.
