= John Paul Cooper =

British architect

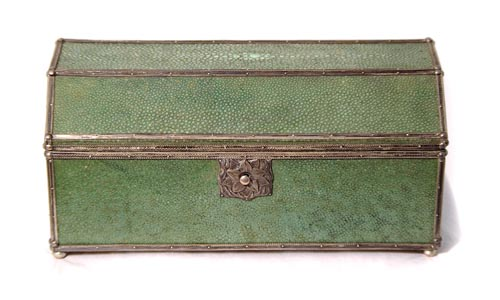
A shagreen and cedarwood box by John Paul Cooper

John Paul Cooper (3 October 1869 – 3 May 1933) was a British architect and a leading craftsman in the Arts and Crafts Movement, specialising in metalwork and jewellery. He is particularly noted for the use of materials such as shagreen and ostrich egg in combination with precious metals and gemstones.

== Architecture ==
Cooper studied architectural drawing for three years from 1888 as an apprentice to John Sedding in London and travelled in Europe in the 1890s with the architects Alfred Hoare Powell and Henry Wilson.

In the 1890s, he made various changes to buildings at St Margaret Works, Leicester for his father's company. He continued in architecture even after starting his own workshop, including building several cottages and an infant school.

== Arts and Crafts ==
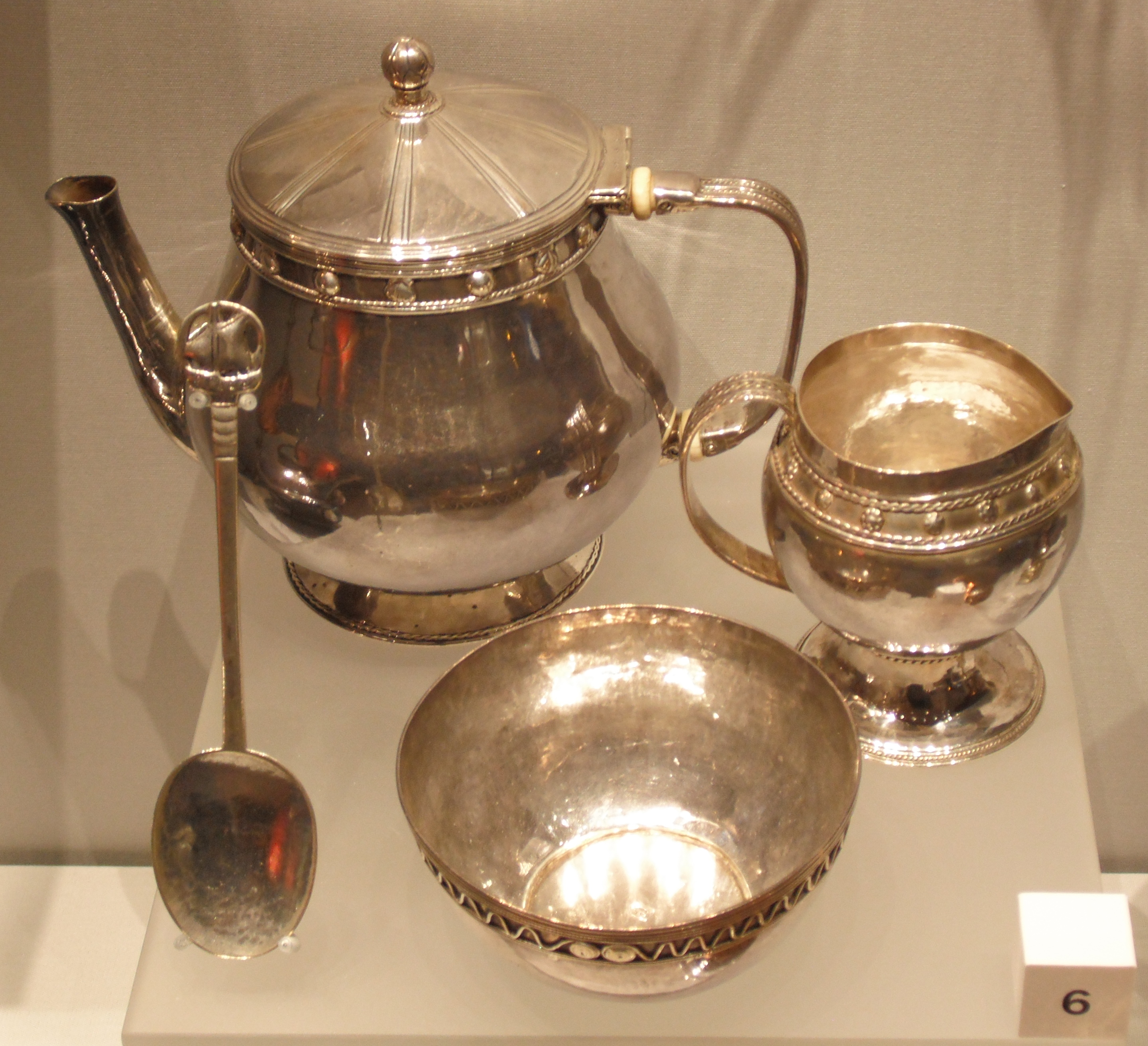
A tea service designed by John Paul Cooper

Cooper took up metalwork in 1897 on the advice of Henry Wilson, Sedding's chief assistant, who he had trained with for several years. Wilson also introduced him to gesso and plasterwork techniques. Cooper set up a workshop in Kensington, sending four pieces to the Arts and Crafts Exhibition in 1899 but did not produce his first jewellery until 1900.

He became Head of the Metalwork Department at Birmingham School of Art from 1904 to 1907 having taught there from 1901 onwards. Several of the craftsmen he employed in his workshop moved with him to teach at Birmingham, including his wife. In his teaching he believed that designers of metalwork should only design items that they themselves had the skill to produce.

Cooper was renowned for the use of shagreen in his designs, a material he started using in 1903 and it was through his use of it that it became established as a luxury material in the 1920s to 1930s. As well as his jewellery and metalwork Cooper also produced watercolour paintings.

After the death of his father his inheritance enabled him to give up teaching and he moved to a rented house in Hunton. In 1910, he moved to Betsom's Hill, the highest hill in Kent, into a house and studio that he had designed himself in an 'Arts and Crafts homage to Kentish rural architecture'. He lived there until his death in 1933.

== Influences and legacy ==
Cooper was influenced by the work of William Morris and collaborated with Ernest Gimson from 1902 to 1906, making handles for his furniture.

Bernard Instone worked in Cooper's studio until World War I and Cooper was an influence on the work of Edward Napier Hitchcock Spencer.

Cooper's works now feature in many museums including the V&A.

== Family life ==
John Paul Cooper was the son of John Harris Cooper and grew up in Rotherby and then Evington Hall, Leicester. He worked with his second cousin May Morgan Oliver from 1899 and married her in 1901. Their son Francis worked with John as a metalworker from 1924. Their daughter Katherine ("Kanty") was a sculptor (a student of Henry Moore) and a humanitarian aid worker during the Spanish Civil War. He is buried in Cudham, Kent.

== Gallery ==
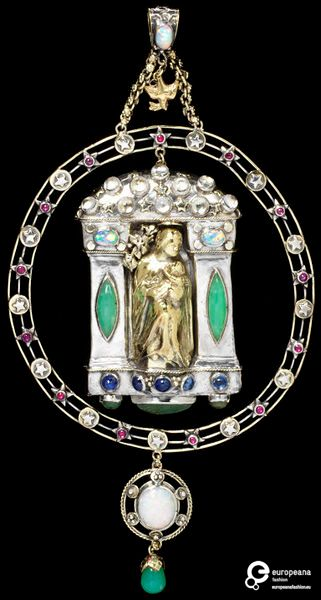
A pendant of gold and silver, set with rubies, chrysoprases, sapphires, aquamarines and opals

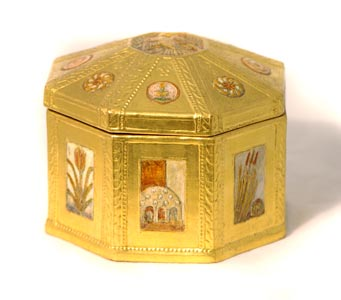
An octagonal casket decorated in gilt gesso.

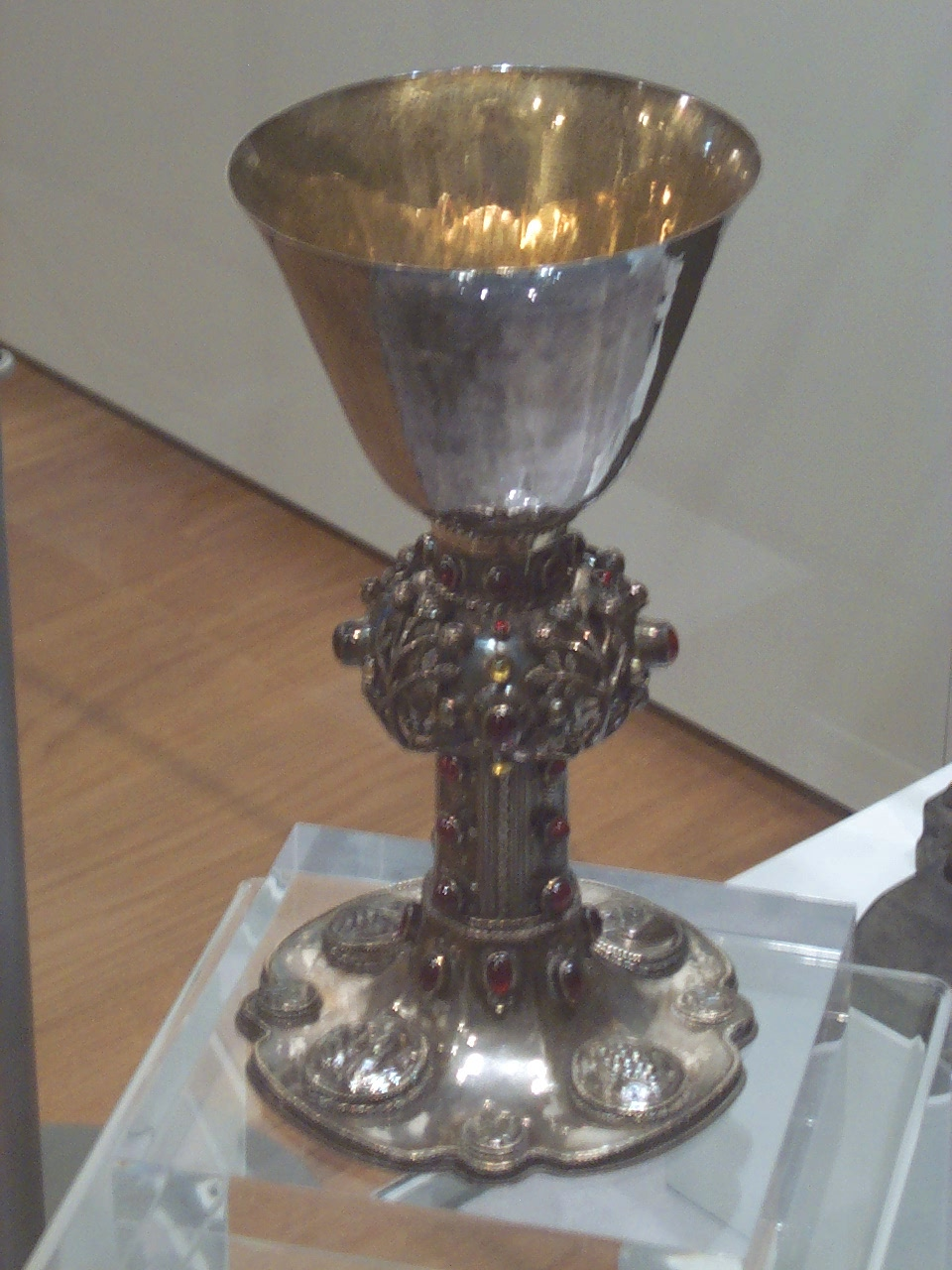
A chalice from the collection of the Cecil Higgins Art Gallery, on display in Bedford.
