= Whitchurch Sand Formation =

Geological formation in England

- Stratigraphic range: Valanginian
- Type: Geological formation
- Unit of: Wealden Group
- Underlies: Gault, Lower Greensand Group
- Overlies: Haddenham Formation, Portland Group
- Thickness: up to 20 metres (70 ft)

Lithology
- Primary: Sandstone
- Other: Mudstone, Siltstone, Ironstone

Location
- Region: Europe
- Country: United Kingdom
- Extent: Buckinghamshire, Oxfordshire, Wiltshire

Type section
- Named for: Whitchurch, Buckinghamshire

The Whitchurch Sand Formation is a geological formation, in England. part of the Wealden Group, it is preserved as an inlier in hills in Buckinghamshire, Oxfordshire and Wiltshire. It was deposited in the Valanginian stage of the Early Cretaceous. The lithology largely consists of unconsolidated fine-medium grained sand with isolated bodies of limonite cemented sandstone, with localised beds of siltstone and mudstone.
