= Betsom's Hill =

Hill on the North Downs, England

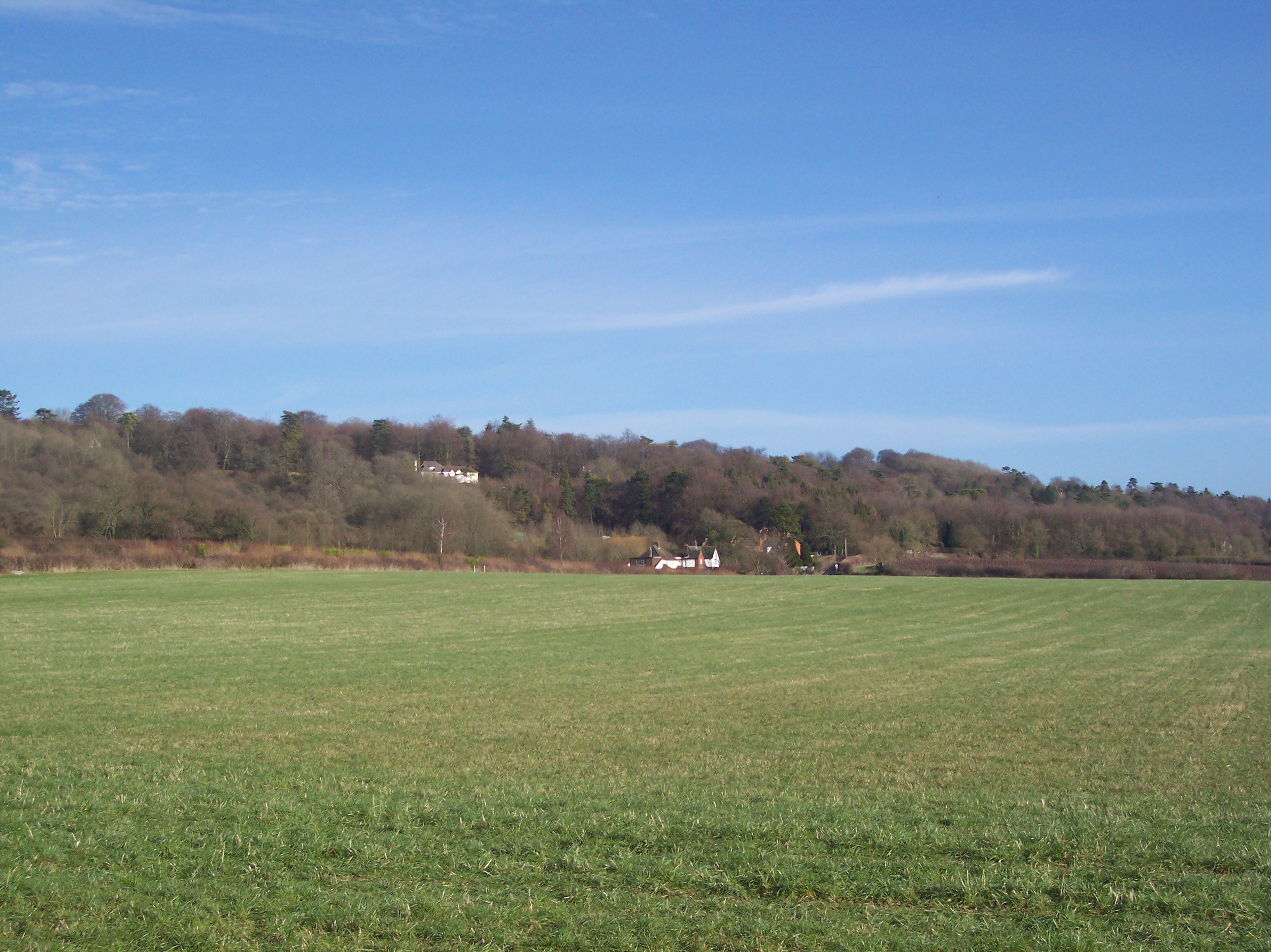
- View of Betsom's Hill from the south-west

Highest point
- Elevation: 251 m (823 ft)
- Listing: County Top
- Coordinates: 51°17′18″N 0°03′26″E

Geography
- Location within Kent
- Location: Westerham, England
- OS grid: TQ 4355 5633

Betsom's Hill is a hill on the North Downs. Situated between Westerham and Tatsfield, at the western edge of the county of Kent, it lies close to where the A233 crosses the Downs en route to Biggin Hill. This is the highest part of the North Downs, with Botley Hill the highest point, nearby to the west. The hill lies at the western end of the Kent Downs, an area of outstanding natural beauty.

== History ==
The crest of the hill was the location of a Victorian defence fort, one of twelve locations along the North Downs built to protect London in case of attack by foreign invaders crossing the channel. Known as Betsom's Hill Fort or Westerham Fort, it was part of the London Defence scheme, and was intended to act both as a mobilisation centre for volunteer troops, and as an ammunition store. The fort which consisted of ramparts, casemates and a magazine has been partially demolished and converted for use as workshops, with private houses appropriately named Fort Cottages now occupying the site.

== Geography ==
The highest part of the hill is unmarked, in an area inaccessible to the public, making it the only county top that is on private land and which cannot be easily visited. The lower slopes are more accessible, with the North Downs Way, a long-distance trail, passing beneath the crest, in an area known as Hill Park. Running in parallel at the foot of the scarp slope is another more ancient route, the Pilgrims Way.

The artist and craftsman John Paul Cooper selected Betsom's Hill as the location for his house, workshop and studio. He designed the house in the Arts and Crafts style to reflect the local Kentish architecture, and lived there until his death in 1933.

== Westerham Heights ==
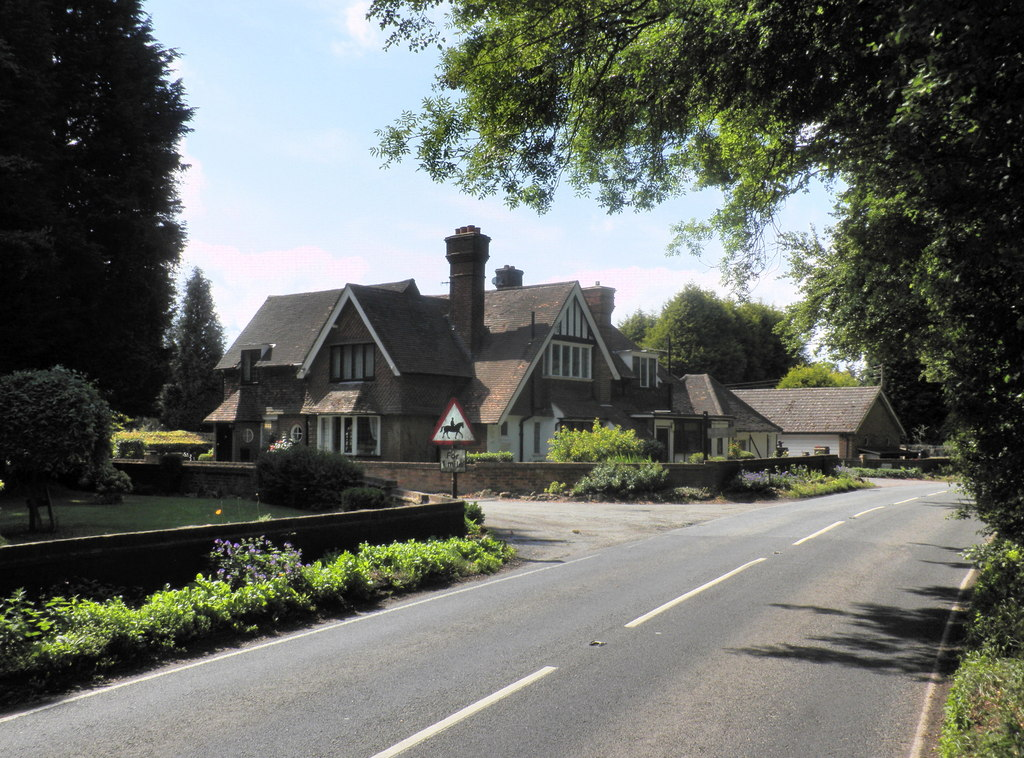
Westerham Heights Farm on the A233

Westerham Heights, the highest point of Greater London at 245 metres (804 ft), is also part of Betsom's Hill, albeit with a separate name. It is located at TQ436564, adjacent to the A233 where the county boundary intersects the dip slope of the escarpment. On the north-west side of the hill, there is another boundary feature, a tripoint where the borders of Surrey, Kent and Greater London meet at Rag Hill.

== Westerham Hill Climb ==
Westerham Hill is the name given to the stretch of the A233 that ascends Betsom's Hill up to Westerham Heights. On 20 August 1887 it was the venue for one of the earliest cycle hill climbs, even though it was considered nearly impossible to complete owing to the steep gradient of the then un-metalled road. Twenty-four competitors took part, using a variety of machines including penny-farthings, tricycles, and the new safety bicycles, all with solid tyres. Organised by the Catford Cycling Club, only half of the starters completed the climb. A rider of a penny-farthing came seventh. The winner was automobile pioneer Selwyn Francis Edge, using a safety bike, and celebrated deaf cyclist Arthur James Wilson finished 12th. Westerham was used for another sixteen of these hill climb events, as were a number of other Kent hills. The modern hill climb event is still run nearby at Yorks Hill.

== See also ==
- Geography of Kent
- Geology of Kent
- List of tripoints of England
