= Geology of East Sussex =

Geology in England

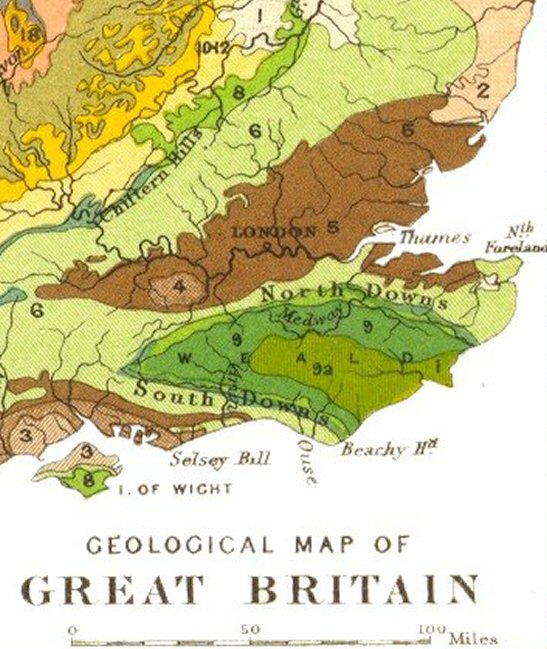
Geology of south-eastern England. The Ashdown Sands and Wadhurst Clay is in lime green (9a); the Low Weald, darker green (9). Chalk Downs, pale green (6)

Geological section from north to south

The geology of East Sussex is defined by the Weald–Artois anticline, a 60 kilometres (37 mi) wide and 100 kilometres (62 mi) long fold within which caused the arching up of the chalk into a broad dome within the middle Miocene, which has subsequently been eroded to reveal a lower Cretaceous to Upper Jurassic stratigraphy. East Sussex is best known geologically for the identification of the first dinosaur by Gideon Mantell, near Cuckfield, to the famous hoax of the Piltdown Man near Uckfield.

The county's chalk has provided a world-class stratigraphic marker giving a great deal of detail in Cretaceous Chalk palaeoecology and palaeontology while in the east of the county on the Kentish border the Dungeness Foreland is important for the study of geomorphology and Holocene sea level fluctuations.

== Geological history ==
The recorded geological history of East Sussex commenced during Carboniferous, with the rocks which are today basement deposited within a low swamp providing coals which were exploited to the north and east in Kent, but boreholes drilled in the 19th century failed to find this deposit in Sussex. The Carboniferous coals are overlain by Permian and Triassic sediments. The sediments were uplifted and faulted within the Variscan Orogeny, with the land now occupied by East Sussex being a low external fold belt to the main orogeny, which was located within the present day English Channel, the remnants of the mountain belt can be seen today in Devon and Cornwall in what is known as the Cornubian Massif. Although unlike in Devon and Cornwall, there was little or no metamorphism.

The mountain belt collapsed soon after the orogeny with the former northward thrusts being reactivated as normal faults and leading to the formation of the Weald Basin which developed as an extension of the considerably larger Wessex Basin. The northern margin of the basin was formed by a series of normal faults, against what was then an area of land, known to geologists as the London-Brabant Massif. The Weald Basin gently subsided throughout the Jurassic, Cretaceous and Early Palaeogene leading to a thick succession of sedimentary rocks being deposited.

== Lithologies ==
The sediments of the Weald of East Sussex were deposited during the early stages of the Cretaceous Period, which lasted for approximately 40 million years from 140 to 100 million years ago. These are collectively known as the Wealden Group and comprise the Purbeck Group, the Hastings Beds, the Weald Clay, the Lower Greensand, the Gault and the Upper Greensand. The Wealden Group is overlain by the Chalk Group, which is subdivided into the White Chalk Subgroup and the Grey Chalk Subgroup. Each of the subgroups is in turn subdivided to formation level.

=== Purbeck Group ===
The oldest exposed rocks in the county are the Purbeck Beds or more formally the Purbeck Group, which are of Late Jurassic to Early Cretaceous age. The Purbeck Beds outcrop at three locations north and northwest west of Battle, East Sussex and at Netherfield. They also occur at several other locations east of Heathfield, East Sussex and at Beak's Wood near Burwash.

The Purbeck Group has a typical thickness of 77 to 186m in the Weald and is composed of predominantly bluish grey calcareous mudstones. Limited developments of limestone, sandstone, siltstone, ironstone and evaporite minerals occur throughout the sequence.

The Purbeck Group was deposited in an environment of braided rivers and muddy lagoons, which periodically dried out, resulting in the now economic deposits of gypsum being deposited in this area, The same beds outcrop on the Jurassic Coast in Dorset but there are difficulties in correlating the two exposures, which has led to increased study of these rocks. During their deposition the region lay at a latitude of about 30°N and thus experienced a tropical climate.

In East Sussex the Purbeck Group is formally subdivided into the Blues and Greys Limestones members, which are typically made up of calcilutite and shelly calcarenites. The Greys Limestones Member is of particular significance as it marks the boundary between the Purbeck Beds and the overlying Ashdown Formation of the Early Cretaceous. This member is characterised by the disarticulated shells of the brackish water bivalve Neomiodon. The lower boundary of the Purbeck Beds is marked by the base of a widespread evaporite deposit of gypsum and anhydrite (up to 21 m thick). These evaporites have been mined and processed in Mountfield, East Sussex since 1876 and are considered to be strategically important.

=== Ashdown Formation (Hastings Beds) ===
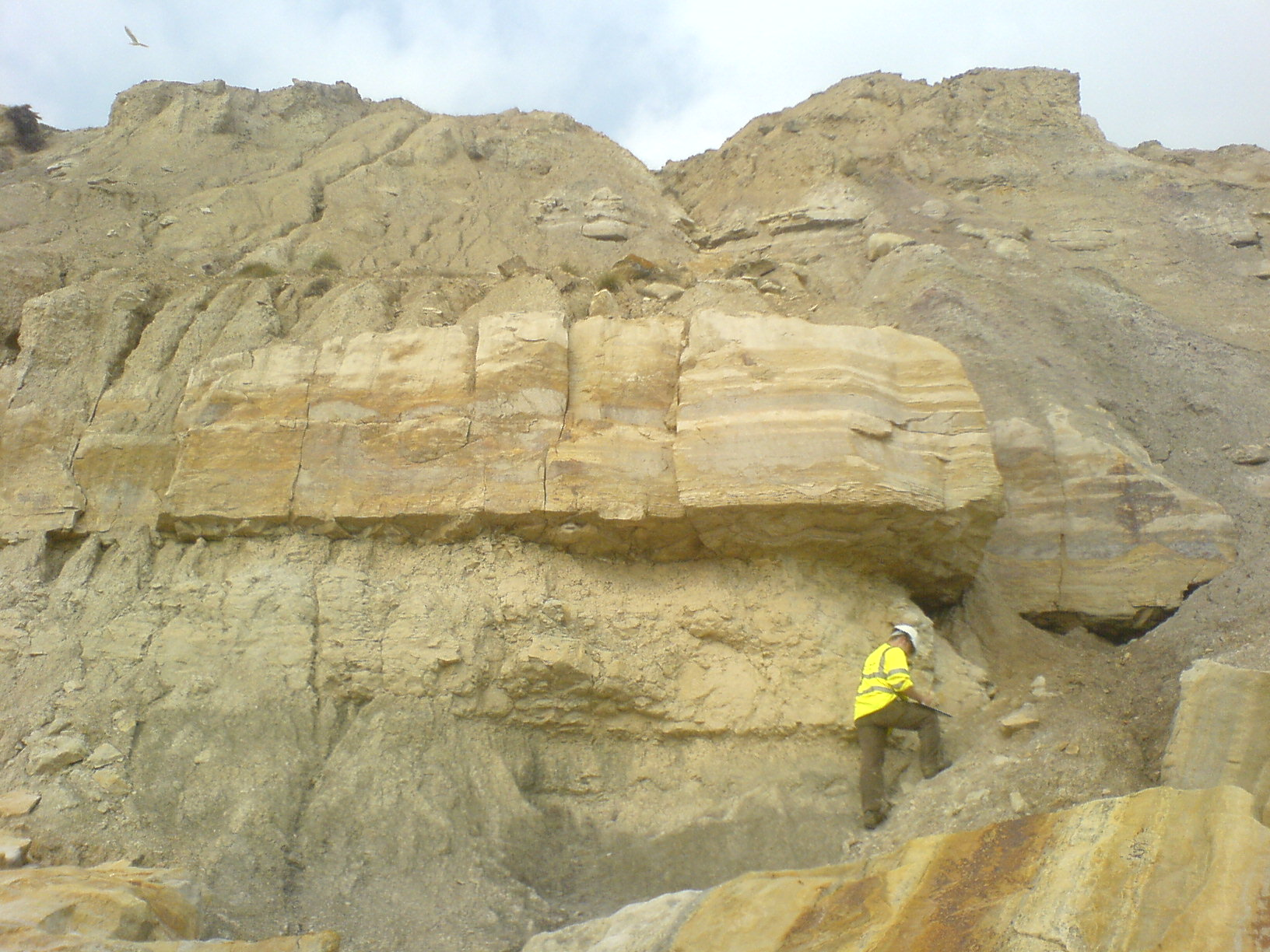
A geologist studies the Ashdown Formation on the East Sussex coast

The upper Purbeck Group records a transition into more sand being delivered into the Weald basin. This has led to the deposition of a mixture of fine sands known as the Ashdown Formation, or Ashdown Beds, which along with the Wadhurst Clay and the Tunbridge Wells Sands compose the Hastings Beds. These strata underlie the county from the boundary with West Sussex at East Grinstead, through the Ashdown Forest to Hastings and Pett Level on the coast.

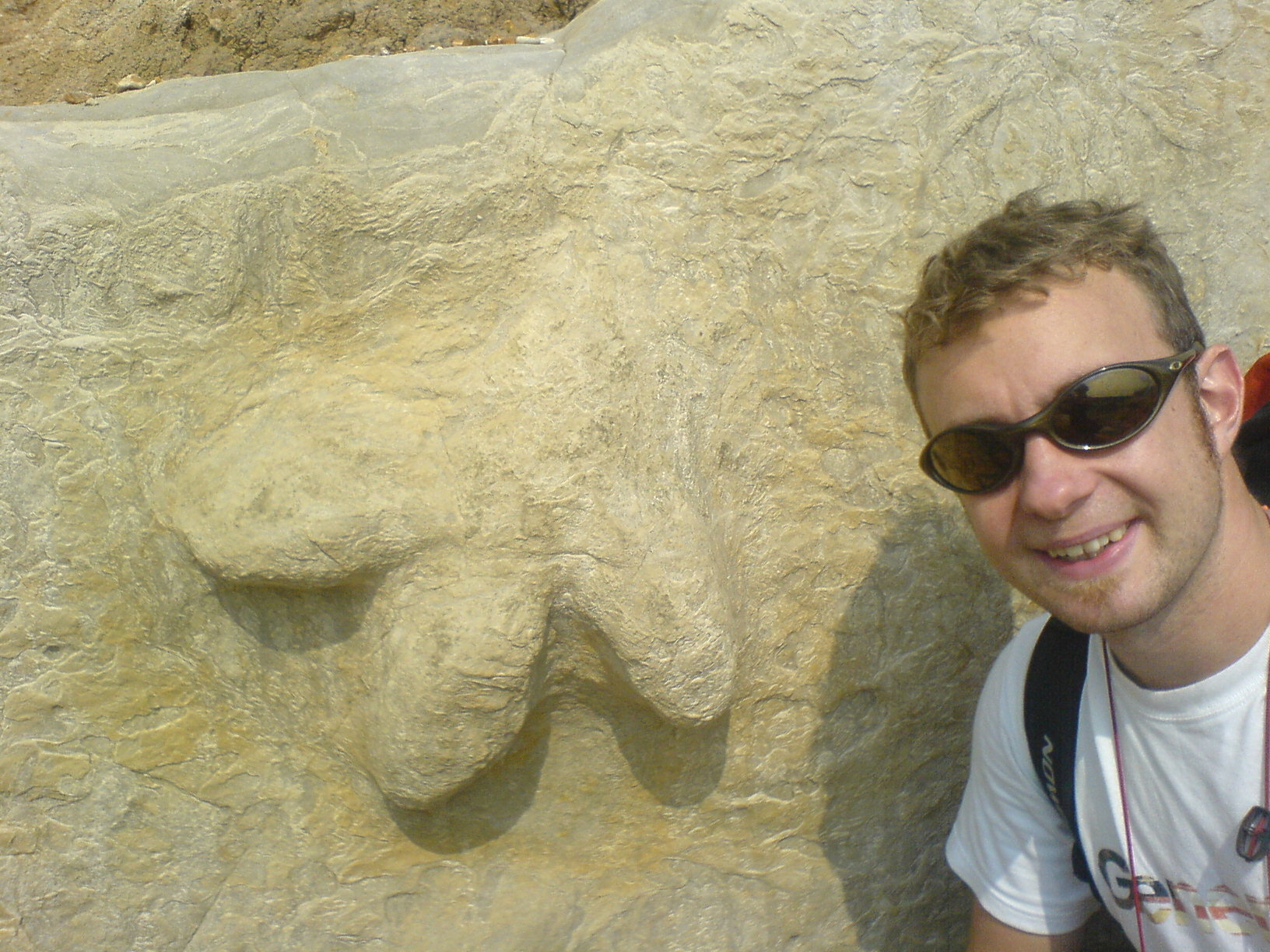
A fossilised Iguanodon dinosaur footprint near Hastings

The Ashdown Beds are the lowermost unit of the Hastings Beds and typically comprise siltstones and silty fine-grained sandstones with small amounts of finely-bedded mudstone and mudstone arranged in rhythmic units ("cyclothems") commonly divided by thin pebble beds as described by the British Geological Survey.

In the east of the county, the formation tends to be more argillaceous, or clayey, in its lowermost part and fines up to a sandier division in the uppermost 30 to 50m. The clays are identified by their characteristic purple and brick-red mottled nature. In early references, these variations give rise to the division of the formation into the ‘Fairlight Clays’ and the ‘Ashdown Sands’. However, it is now considered as one due to the impressistence of the clays across the Weald. Despite this the variations of clays and sands in the formation are usually marked separately on the maps and records of the British Geological Survey. In its entirety the formation is usually found to be between 180 and 215m thick

The Ashdown Formation is best exposed in the 8 km cliff section between Hastings and Pett Level. At this location the formation can be followed from the axis of the Wealden Anticline at Lee Ness Ledge through the well distinguished marker beds and horizons to its juncture with the Wadhurst Clay at Hastings Castle to the west and Cliff End to the east. The Lee Ness Ledge is known for its many well preserved fossilised dinosaur footprints, particularly Iguanodon.

=== Wadhurst Clay Formation (Hastings Beds) ===
The British Geological Survey describe the Wadhurst Clay Formation as made of soft, dark grey thinly-bedded mudstones ("shales") and mudstones with subordinate beds of pale grey siltstone, fine-grained sandstone, shelly limestone, clay ironstone and rare pebble beds, which shows evidence of unconformable weathering at the top of the bed. The mudstones often degrade in a short period of time when they become exposed at the surface and weather to heavy ochre and greenish grey clays.

The formation thickness ranges from 55m in the Tenterden area, to 30m near Lewes and varies in between. Outside of East Sussex, the Wadhurst Clay has been proven to over 70m thick near Tunbridge Wells and up to 80m near Horsham.

The base of the Wadhurst Clay is taken at the bottom of the Top Ashdown Pebble Bed. Despite its name this thin and impressistent bed comprises a coarse grained to gravelly sandstone. This horizon is best exposed at Cliff End, but where it is encountered elsewhere in the county it is usually fairly distinctive and easily identified. The Top Ashdown Pebble Bed occurs mainly in the southern half of the county and is often missing in the northern half. Where this is the case, the boundary is taken at a layer of disconnected ripplesl.

The Wadhurst Clay hosted small nodules of iron ore which was the very foundation of the Wealden iron industry. The ore was deposited in a tropical environment within which iron brought in from the eroding mountains in the west was altered into small nodules of ilmenite. A succession of clays and sands was deposited into the subsiding basin, with much of the source material also being delivered from the north and east as well as the west.

=== Tunbridge Wells Sand Formation (Hastings Beds) ===
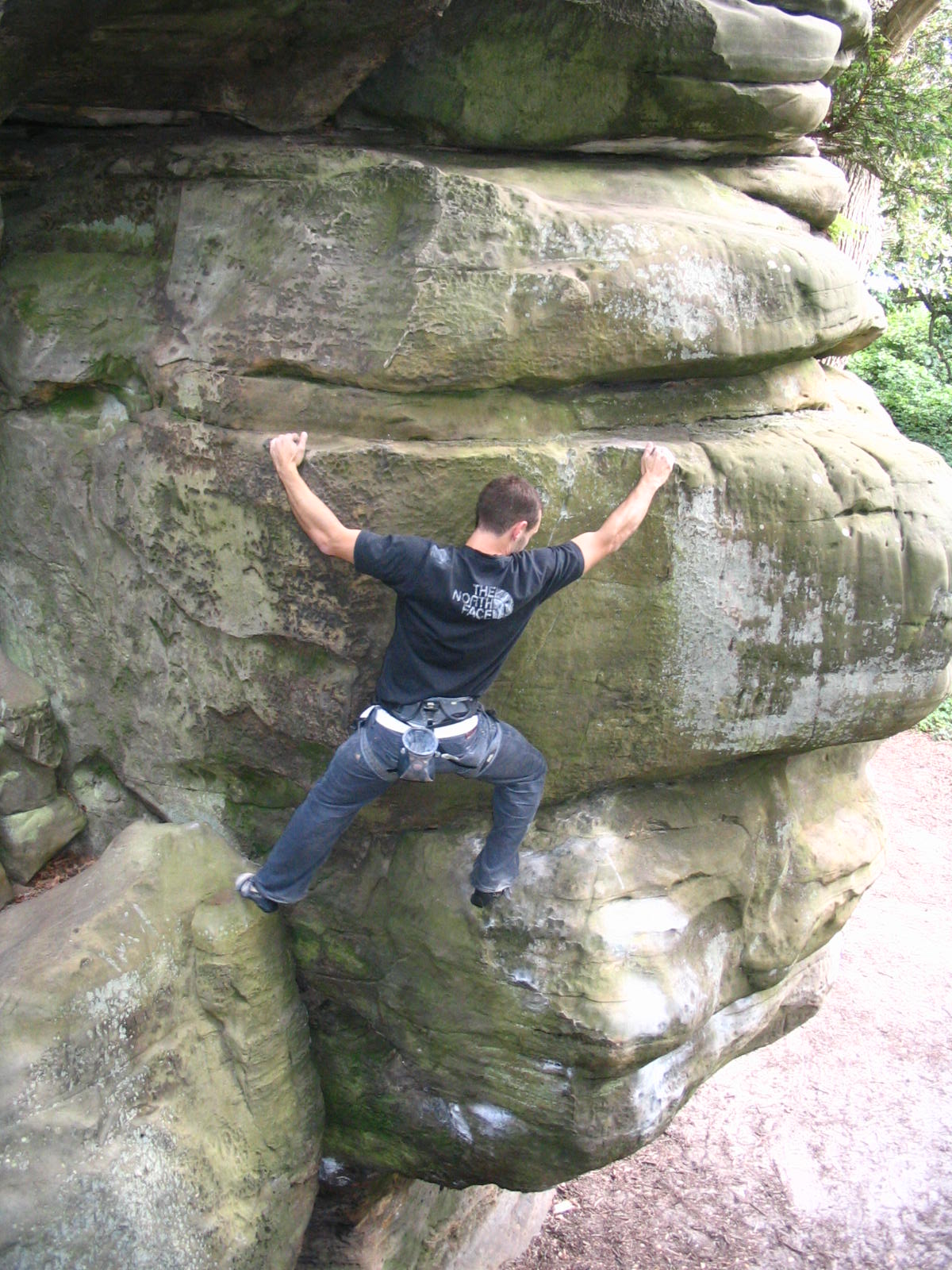
Climber enjoying the Lower Cretaceous Ashdown Bed Sandstones of High Rocks

The Tunbridge Wells Sand Formation is the uppermost and youngest formation of the Hastings Beds. Its thickness is typically in the region of 110 to 125m. Outside of the county, near Haywards Heath, borehole data has proven the formation to be up to 150m thick. The formation is lithologically similar to the Ashdown Formation and comprises complex cyclic sequences of siltstones with sandstones and clays, typically fining upwards. In the western parts of the county the Tunbridge Wells Sands can be divided into three; the Lower Tunbridge Wells Sand, the Grinstead Clay, and the Upper Tunbridge Wells Sand.

=== Greensands and Gault ===
The Greensands and the Gault best define the Wealden Anticline, running in a broad horseshoe from Folkestone in the East, to Petersfield in Hampshire in the West and back to Eastbourne. The Greensands are divided into two units, the Lower Greensand and Upper Greensand, which sandwich the Gault. The three units outcrop in East Sussex along the bottom of the Downs and northward into the Vale of the Weald. Although named as such the Lower Greensand is rarely sand and rarely green; the name was applied by mistake by 19th century geologists mistakenly thinking that the mineral glauconite would be found in the seams of sandstone both above and below the Gault clay.

The Gault is one of the most fossil rich horizons in the UK; yielding plentiful bivalves, cephalopod (including ammonites) and gastropods. This has allowed for a tight correlation of the age of the Gault with other geological units in Europe, under the science of biostratigraphy. At its maximum the Gault sea grew to cover the northern landmass which had supplied the sediment for the lower sandstones; by this time Britain was at 35°N and the land and sea teemed with dinosaurs and marine reptiles, the remains of which have been found in the Gault.

=== Chalk Group ===
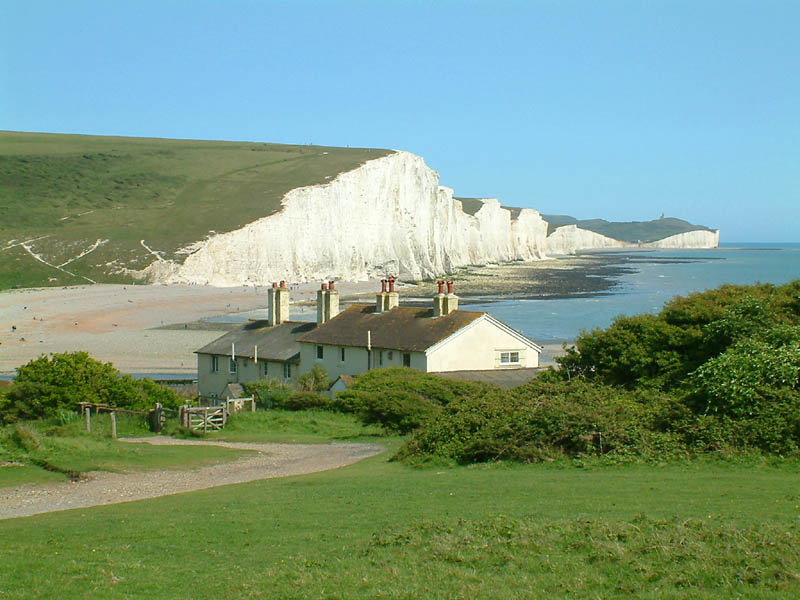
The Seven Sisters cliffs and the coastguard cottages, from Seaford Head across the River Cuckmere

The Chalk Group is the most well known rock in East Sussex, forming the Downs and where it meets the sea the spectacular Seven Sisters and geologically and biologically rich cliffs from Brighton to Newhaven. The Chalk formed in a warm, clear sea which stretched from Texas to Poland (prior to the opening of the Atlantic) and is subdivided into three units, the Lower, Middle and Upper Chalk.

== Cenozoic ==
After the end of the Cretaceous deposition continued, with the Reading and London Beds (clays and sandstones) being deposited during the Cenozoic, these are no longer exposed in East Sussex, but can be seen in London and North Kent. The older shelly clays of the Woolwich Beds at Newhaven; with gypsum to be found within the beds.

== The structural reversal of the basin ==
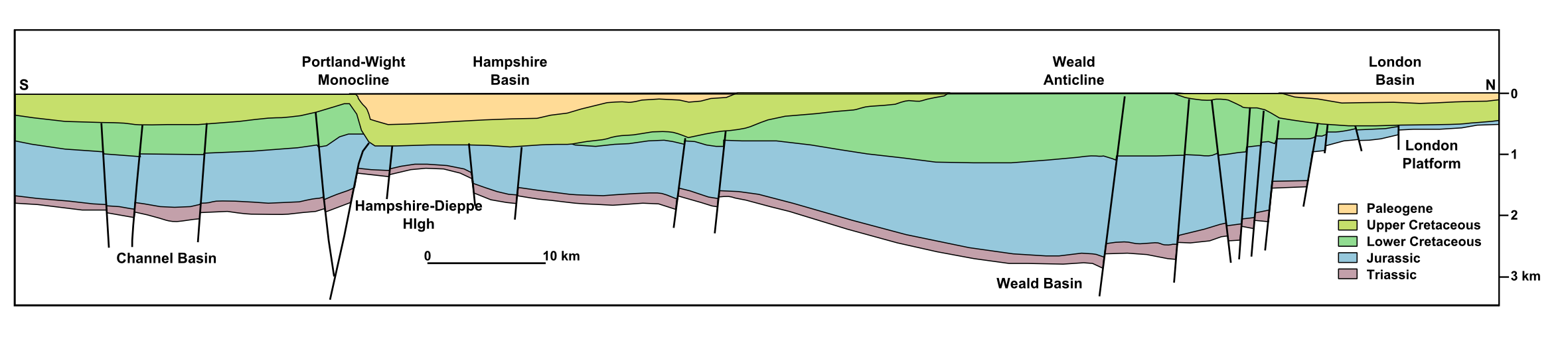
Cross section view of Southern England featuring the Weald Basin

For much of its history the Weald had been slowly subsiding basin, but the growth of the Alpine Chain to the south during the Cenozoic caused a reactivation of the Variscan basement basin-bounding faults, the rocks were arched into a broad anticline which stretched across the English Channel to Northern France, the Weald–Artois anticline. Inversion of the basin is closely correlated to compressional events within the Alps and occurred alongside deformation in Hampshire, Dorset and northern France. The basin was compressed between two 'blocks' of basement rocks, with the northward movement of the block against the London Platform; the areas of land that earlier in the Weald's history supplied the sediments. The Anticline has since been eroded down to reveal the pattern of stratigraphy with the oldest rocks in the centre of the anticline forming a low ridge which runs roughly from Crowborough to Battle and onto Boulogne.

== Economic Resources ==
The geology of East Sussex includes a number of natural resources, at Mountfield, Robertsbridge there is a gypsum mine which produces significant quantities of gypsum extracted from the Purbeck Beds. As previously mentioned the Wadhurst Clay holds ferrous ore which was extracted up to the 17th century. Although source rocks for oil underlie East Sussex and the major geologic structure in the area is an anticline, petroleum is not considered to be hosted below East Sussex. However while drilling for water at Heathfield railway station, natural gas was discovered, which was utilised to provide the first gas lighting in the UK, however it was recognised that economic oil reserves were not accessible. Ongoing exploration for petroleum is active in West Sussex however.

The largest amount of clay extraction occurs within the low Weald, with brickworks extracting the Weald and Wadhurst clay. Chalk is also extracted in the south of the county, with commercial extraction ongoing near Lewes where a number of chalk extraction pits also lie disused.
