= Bowles Rocks =

Climbing areas of England

Coordinates: 51.075606°N 0.200125°E

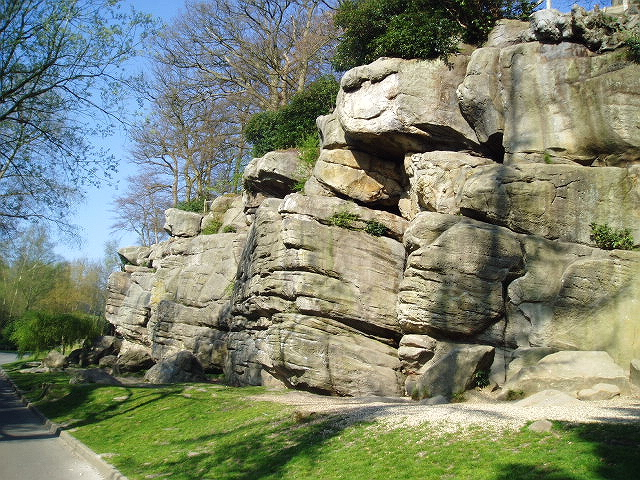
Bowles Rocks

Bowles Rocks is a sandstone crag in the county of East Sussex, on the border with Kent, approximately 8 kilometres (5 mi) south of the town of Royal Tunbridge Wells. It is popular with rock climbers due to the excellent, south-facing, quick-drying rock, the range of climbs and the ease of access. It is one of the cluster of local outcrops known as Southern Sandstone.

== History ==
Bowles Rocks was cleared in the early 1960s by John Walters, who was inspired to set up a 'rock climbing gymnasium'. Previously the site had been used as a firing range during the Second World War and to house pigs – hence the climb named Pig's Nose and area called Range Wall. The bullet holes in the rock and larger square holes lower down, which once supported the wooden beams of the pig sties, can still be clearly seen.

== Climbing ==
There are approximately 230 climbs or variants at Bowles Rocks, ranging widely in difficulty. A good list can be found here.

== Type of rock ==
Bowles Rocks is made of a relatively soft sandstone, formed 130 to 140 million years ago. This rock has a hard skin or rind enriched with organic matter and silica and iron salts deposited when water from within the rock evaporates. However, this skin is easily worn away so it is important that climbers keep erosion to a minimum. Top ropes should be set up so as to ensure that rope movement against rock surfaces is minimised and lowering off is not permitted.

== Bowles Rocks Trust ==
Bowles Rocks is owned and managed by the Bowles Rocks Trust as part of Bowles Outdoor Centre. The centre has developed over 50 years and now works with several thousand young people each year. It has two dry ski slopes, a pool and residential accommodation for young people in line with achieving its charitable objectives.
