= Tunbridge Wells Sand Formation =

Stratigraphic unit in England

- Stratigraphic range: Late Valanginian
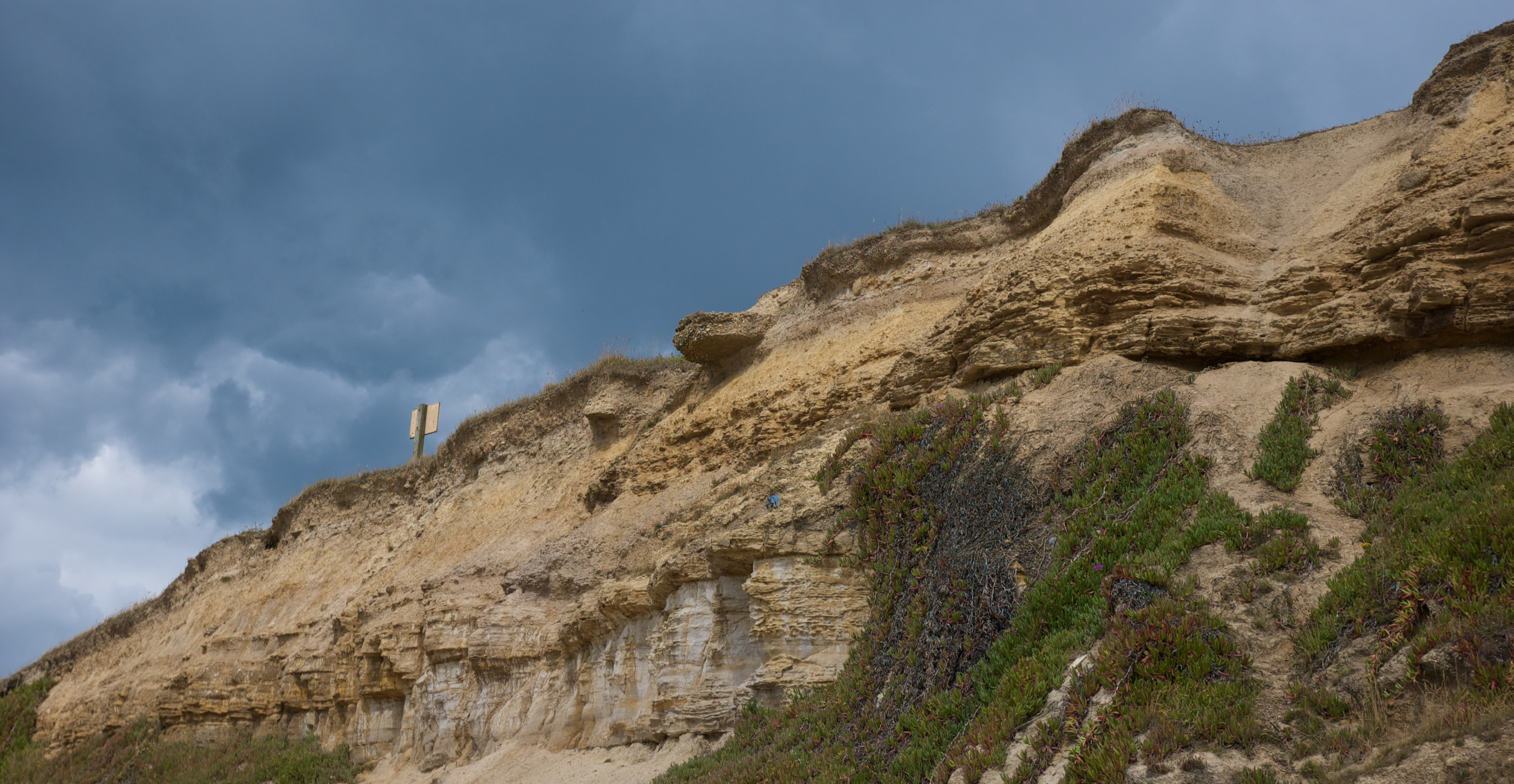
- Cliffs of Tunbridge Wells Sand at Bexhill-on-Sea
- Type: Geological formation
- Unit of: Wealden Group
- Sub-units: Upper Tunbridge Wells Sand Member; Grinstead Clay Member; Ardingly Sandstone Member; Lower Tunbridge Wells Sand Member
- Underlies: Weald Clay
- Overlies: Wadhurst Clay Formation
- Thickness: Generally 75 m, but varies from 46 to 122 m

Lithology
- Primary: Sandstone, Siltstone
- Other: Mudstone, Limestone

Location
- Region: Europe
- Country: United Kingdom
- Extent: Weald Basin

Type section
- Named for: Royal Tunbridge Wells

The Tunbridge Wells Sand Formation is a geological unit which forms part of the Wealden Group and the uppermost and youngest part of the unofficial Hastings Beds. These geological units make up the core of the geology of the Weald in the English counties of West Sussex, East Sussex and Kent.

The other component formations of the Hastings Beds are the underlying Wadhurst Clay Formation and the Ashdown Formation. The Hastings Beds in turn form part of the Wealden Group which underlies much of southeast England. The sediments of the Weald, including the Tunbridge Wells Sand Formation, were deposited during the Early Cretaceous Period, which lasted for approximately 40 million years from 140 to 100 million years ago. The Tunbridge Wells Sands are of Late Valanginian age. The Formation takes its name from the spa town of Tunbridge Wells in Kent.

== Lithology ==
The Tunbridge Wells Sand Formation comprises complex cyclic sequences of siltstones with sandstones and clays, typically fining upwards, and is lithologically similar to the older Ashdown Formation. It has a total thickness typically in the region of about 75 m. However, near Haywards Heath borehole data has proven the formation to be up to 150m thick.

In the western parts of the High Weald the Tunbridge Wells Sands can be divided into four separate divisions; the Lower Tunbridge Wells Sand, the Ardingly Sandstone Member, the Grinstead Clay Member, and the Upper Tunbridge Wells Sand.

=== Lower Tunbridge Wells Sand ===
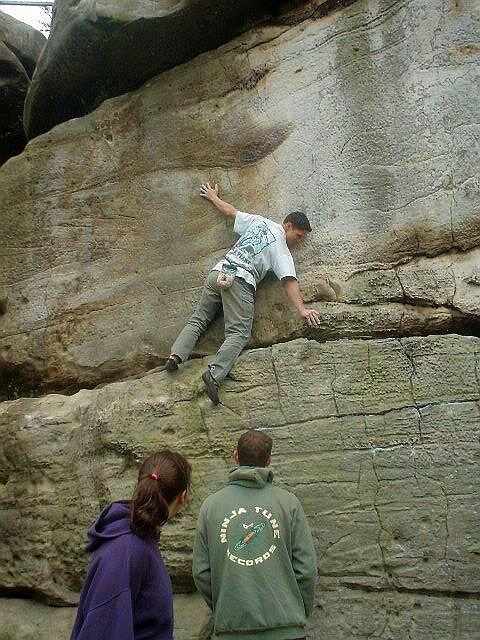
A climber scales the Ardingly Sandstone at Bowles Rocks near Crowborough

The Lower Tunbridge Wells Sand shows the best cyclic fining up sequences in the formation. The division comprises mainly interbedded siltstones and silty sandstones and occurs up to 27m thick.

=== Ardingly Sandstone Member ===
A massive thick cross bedded fine to medium grained quartz sandstone separates the Tunbridge Wells Sands from the overlying Grinstead Clay. This horizon is known as the Ardingly Sandstone and occurs in thicknesses of up to 18m. It is particularly well exposed throughout the region between East Grinstead, West Sussex, and Tunbridge Wells, Kent, at localities such as; Stone Farm south of East Grinstead; Chiddinglye Rocks near West Hoathly; Toad Rock, Bull's Hollow and Happy Valley west of Tunbridge Wells; and Harrisons Rocks, Bowles Rocks and High Rocks near Tunbridge Wells. At all of these places the Ardingly Sandstone forms a weathering-resistant layer, relative to the rest of the formation, which has become very popular with rock climbers and is known locally as Southern Sandstone. These are the closest rock climbing crags to London and as a result are the most heavily used in the country.

=== Grinstead Clay Member ===
The Grinstead Clay comprises mudstones and silty mudstones with siltstone, ironstone and shelly limestone. This member is lithologically similar to the older Wadhurst Clay and also has weathered red mottled clays at its top. The formation is up to 20m thick but is only present around the border of East Sussex and West Sussex. It can be further subdivided into the Lower Grinstead Clay and Upper Grinstead Clay. These divisions are separated by a lenticular calcareous sandstone known as the Cuckfield Stone. This is probably best known as the strata in which Gideon Mantell discovered Iguanodon in the early 19th century.

=== Upper Tunbridge Wells Sand ===
The Upper Tunbridge Wells Sand is similar to the Lower Tunbridge Wells Sand. It comprises soft red and grey mottled silts and clays in its lower part, and alternating silts and silty clays with thin beds of sandstones.

The base of the Tunbridge Wells Sand is marked by a distinct change from the predominantly argillaceous sediments of the Wadhurst Clay to siltstones and silty sands. This boundary is often indicated on maps by spring lines and seepages, where groundwater percolating through the permeable Tunbridge Wells Sand is forced to surface at the junction with the Wadhurst Clay.

The top of the Tunbridge Wells Sand Formation is well defined in the southwest of East Sussex but is gradational elsewhere. In the area north of Brighton and west of Lewes the boundary is marked by a massive sandstone, though this is not seen anywhere else.

== Engineering Geology ==
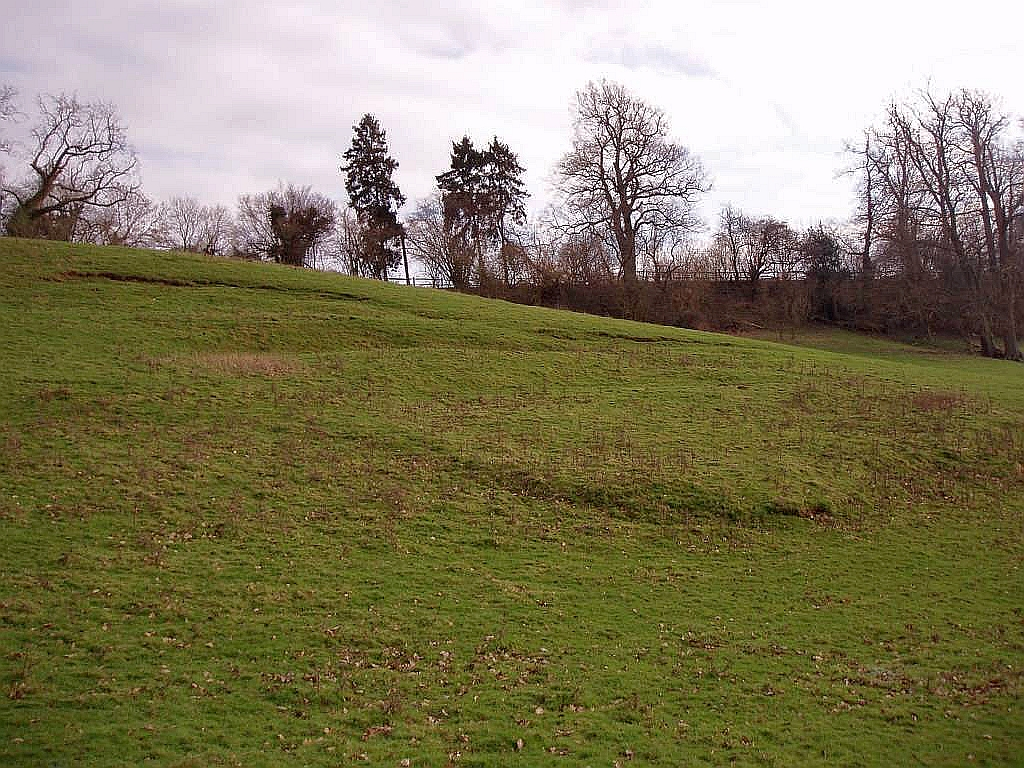
Translational landslip at the boundary of the Wadhurst Clay and Tunbridge Wells Sand near Etchingham

Landslips often occur at or close to the lower boundary of the Tunbridge Wells Sands, between it and the underlying Wadhurst Clay Formation. This is partly caused by the steep sided hill, valley and ravine topography of the High Weald and partly by the lithological variation between the formations and the presence of spring lines and seepages.

When percolating groundwater in the permeable sandstones of the Tunbridge Wells Sands comes into contact with the upper impermeable clay beds of the Wadhurst Clay, it is forced to find alternative migration pathways to the surface. This results in the saturation and weakening of the upper portion of the Wadhurst Clay, increasing the chances of failure.

== Paleobiota ==
=== Pterosaurs ===
Pterosaurs reported from the Tunbridge Wells Sands
Genus	Species	Location	Stratigraphic position	Material	Notes	Images
Serradraco	S. sagittirostris	St.-Leonards-on-Sea	Upper Tunbridge Wells Sands	Lower jaw, vertebrae	An ornithocheiromorph	
Rexarthuria	R. cliftii			Partial humerus	A tapejaromorph azhdarchoid	

=== Crocodyliformes ===
Crocodyliformes reported from the Tunbridge Wells Sands
Genus	Species	Location	Stratigraphic position	Material	Notes	Images
Hulkepholis	H. willetti	Cuckfield	Grinstead Clay		A goniopholidid	
Goniopholis	Indeterminate	Pevensey Pit, Ashdown Brickworks	Lower Tunbridge Wells Sand		A goniopholidid	

=== Turtles ===
Turtles reported from the Tunbridge Wells Sands
Genus	Species	Location	Stratigraphic position	Material	Notes	Images
“Helochelydra”	“Helochelydra” bakewelli	Cuckfield	Grinstead Clay	Shell fragments	A helochelydrid turtle, unclear whether it actually belongs to Helochelydra	

=== Dinosaurs ===
Dinosaurs reported from the Tunbridge Wells Sands
Genus	Species	Location	Stratigraphic position	Material	Notes	Images
Barilium	B. dawsoni	Whiteman's Green, Cuckfield	Grinstead Clay	Lower Jaw	An iguanodontian, originally given the name Kukufeldia	
Regnosaurus	R. northamptoni	Tilgate Forest, Cuckfield	Grinstead Clay Member	Lower jaw	Nomen dubium.	
Hylaeosaurus	H. armatus	Tilgate Forest, Cuckfield	Grinstead Clay Member	"Partial skull, skeleton, isolated postcrania."	An ankylosaur	
Suchosaurus	S. cultridens	Tilgate Forest, Cuckfield	Grinstead Clay Member	Teeth	A spinosaurid	
Valdoraptor	V. oweni	Cuckfield		"Metatarsals."	An ornithomimosaur	
Pelorosaurus	P. conybeari	Cuckfield Quarry, Tilgate		" Humerus (Holotype) [and four] caudal vertebrae." These were found separately and might belong to different taxa	A basal titanosauriform	

=== Mammals ===
Mammals reported from the Tumbridge Wells Sands
Genus	Species	Location	Stratigraphic position	Material	Notes	Images
?Aegialodon	?A. dawsoni	Paddockhurst bone bed	Grinstead Clay			
Spalacotherium	S. taylori	Paddockhurst bone bed	Grinstead Clay			
Loxaulax	L. valdensis	Paddockhurst bone bed	Grinstead Clay			

== See also ==
- Hastings Beds
- Ashdown Formation
- Wadhurst Clay Formation
- Geology of East Sussex
