= Wadhurst Clay Formation =

Geological unit

- Stratigraphic range: Valanginian
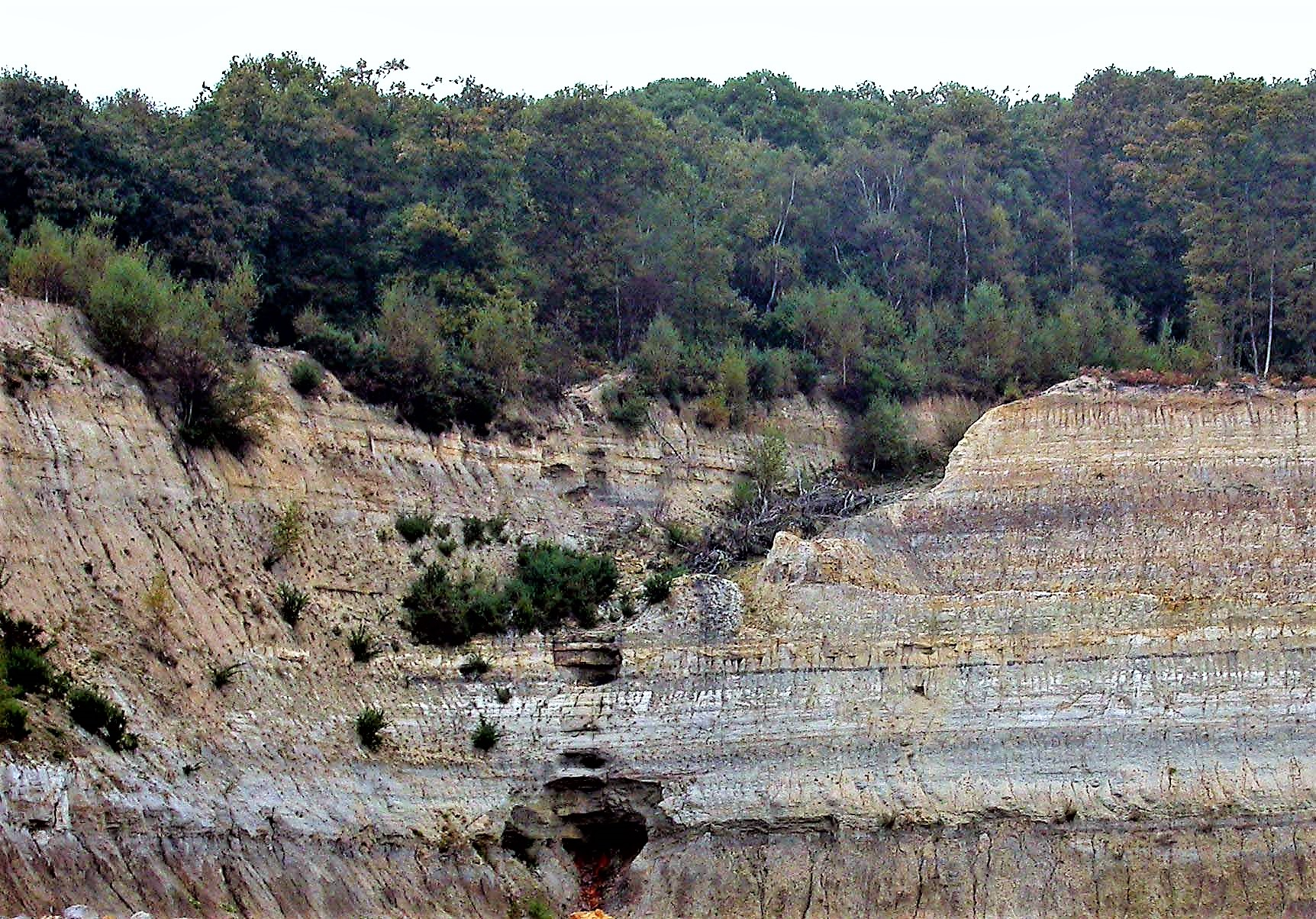
- Wadhurst Clay (grey) exposed at Bexhill Brick Pit
- Type: Geological formation
- Unit of: Wealden Group
- Underlies: Tunbridge Wells Sand Formation
- Overlies: Ashdown Formation
- Thickness: 30 to 78 m

Lithology
- Primary: Shale, Mudstone
- Other: Siltstone, Sandstone, Limestone, Ironstone

Location
- Region: Europe
- Country: UK
- Extent: Weald Basin

Type section
- Named for: Wadhurst

The Wadhurst Clay Formation is a geological unit which forms part of the Wealden Group and the middle part of the now unofficial Hastings Beds. These geological units make up the core of the geology of the High Weald in the English counties of West Sussex, East Sussex and Kent.

The other component formations of the Hastings Beds are the underlying Ashdown Formation and the overlying Tunbridge Wells Sand Formation. The Hastings Beds in turn form part of the Wealden Group which underlies much of southeast England. The sediments of the Weald, including the Wadhurst Clay Formation, were deposited during the Early Cretaceous Period, which lasted for approximately 40 million years from 140 to 100 million years ago. The Wadhurst Clay is of Early to Late Valanginian age. The Formation takes its name from the market town of Wadhurst in East Sussex.

== Lithology ==
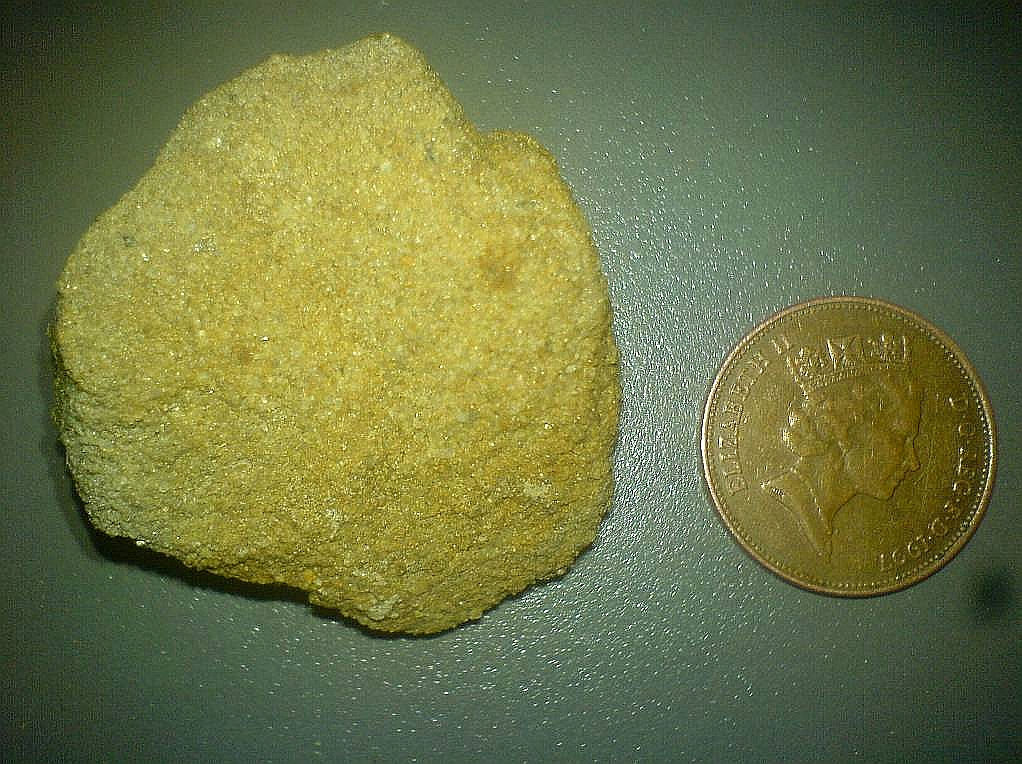
The Top Ashdown Pebble Bed, which marks the base of the Wadhurst Clay in East Sussex

The Wadhurst Clay comprises predominantly medium to dark bluish grey over-consolidated clays, silts, mudstones, and shales. These lithologies often occur with subordinate amounts of pale grey silty mudstones, laminated siltstones, sandstones, conglomerate, shelly limestones and clay-ironstones. When they become exposed to the elements at the surface, the mudstones often degrade over a short period of time and weather to yellowish brown and greenish grey clays.

The formation thickness ranges from 55m in the Tenterden area, to 30m near Lewes and varies in between. In Kent, the Wadhurst Clay has been proven to over 70m thick near Tunbridge Wells and in West Sussex up to 80m near Horsham.

The base of the Wadhurst Clay is taken at the bottom of the Top Ashdown Pebble Bed. The base of this marker horizon marks the formational change to the Ashdown Formation. Despite its name this thin and impressistent bed comprises a coarse grained to gravelly sandstone. This horizon is best exposed at Cliff End, East Sussex, but where it is encountered elsewhere, it is usually fairly distinctive and easily identified. The Top Ashdown Pebble Bed occurs mainly in the southern half of East Sussex and is often missing elsewhere. Where this is the case, the boundary is taken at a layer of disconnected ripples.

The top of the Wadhurst Clay is marked by a distinct lithological change into the siltstones of the Tunbridge Wells Sand Formation. The uppermost clays of the Wadhurst Clay, closest to the boundary are often stained red.

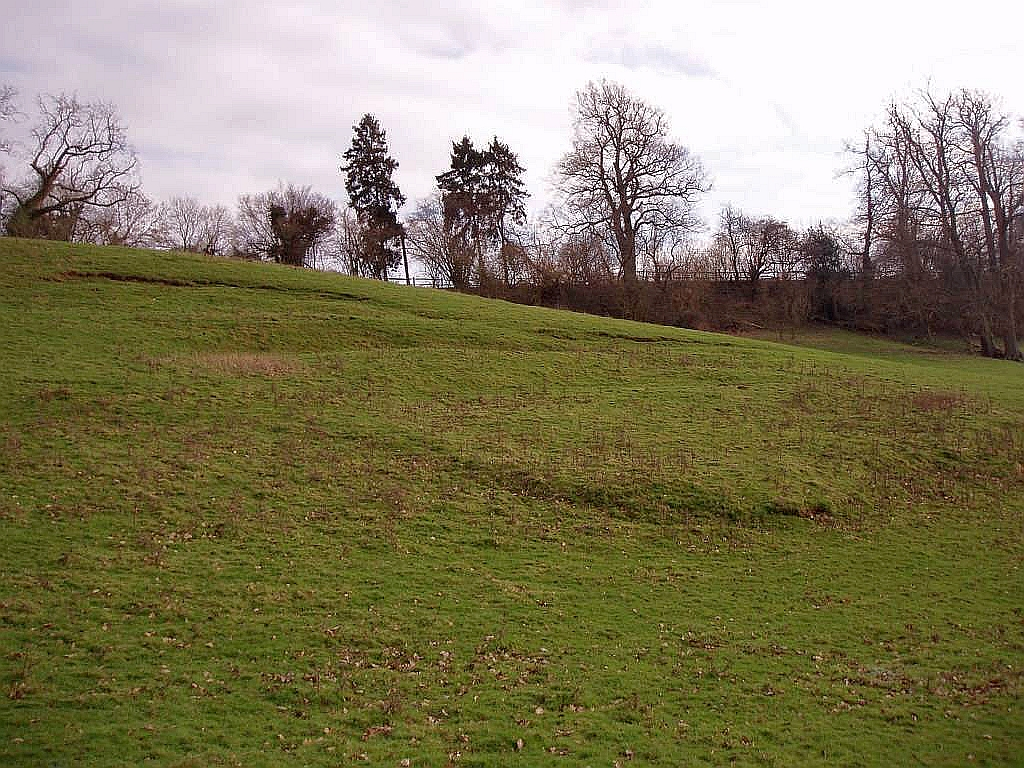
Translational landslip at the boundary of the Wadhurst Clay and Tunbridge Wells Sand near Etchingham

== Engineering Geology ==
Natural slopes in the Wadhurst Clay, like those in the Ashdown Formation, are known for their instability, especially where impermeable clays and impermeable silts and siltstones are interbedded. Instability, resulting in landslips, often occurs along shear surfaces and weaknesses that originally developed during the Late Devensian glaciation. Other common features include cambering, valley bulging and solifluction lobes.

Landslips often occur at or close to the upper boundary of the Wadhurst Clay, which is shared with the overlying Tunbridge Wells Sand Formation. This is partly caused by the steep sided hill, valley and ravine topography of the High Weald and partly by the lithological variation between the formations and the presence of spring lines and seepages.

When percolating groundwater in the permeable sandstones of the Tunbridge Wells Sands comes into contact with the upper impermeable clay beds of the Wadhurst Clay, it is forced to find alternative migration pathways to the surface. This results in the saturation and weakening of the upper portion of the Wadhurst Clay, increasing the chances of failure.

== Paleobiota ==
Taken from

=== Fish ===
Fish reported from the Wadhurst Clay
Genus	Species	Location	Stratigraphic position	Material	Notes	Images
Egertonodus	E. basanus	Ashdown Brickworks			Hybodont shark	
Planohybodus	P. ensis	Ashdown Brickworks			Hybodont shark	
Polyacrodus	P. parvidens, P. brevicostatus	Ashdown Brickworks			Hybodont shark	
Ocloedus		Ashdown Brickworks			Pycnodontiform	
Coccolepis		Ashdown Brickworks			Coccolepidid	
Semionotiformes,		Ashdown Brickworks				
Albuliformes		Ashdown Brickworks				

=== Dinosaurs ===
Dinosaurs reported from the Wadhurst Clay
Genus	Species	Location	Stratigraphic position	Material	Notes	Images
Altispinax	A. dunkeri	Hollington Quarry		Tooth	An carnosaurian theropod	
Barilium	B. dawsoni	Shornden Quarry, Old Roar Quarry,		"[Two] partial skeletons."	An iguanodontian	
Hypselospinus	H. fittoni	Hollington Quarry, Shornden Quarry, Hare Farm Lane, Brede		Partial skeletons	An iguanodontian	
Unnamed maniraptoran	Indeterminate	Ashdown Brickworks		Specimen BEXHM: 2008.14.1 A single cervical vertebra	Possibly an oviraptorosaur	

=== Amphibians ===
Amphibians reported from the Wadhurst Clay
Genus	Species	Location	Stratigraphic position	Material	Notes	Images
Anura	Indeterminate	Ashdown Brickworks		Two fragmentary ilia	At least 2 taxa	
Urodela	Indeterminate	Ashdown Brickworks		Atlas and postatlas vertebrae, dentary, maxilla and vomer fragments	At least 3 taxa distinguishable by their atlas vertebrae	

=== Crocodyliformes ===
Crocodyliformes reported from the Wadhurst Clay
Genus	Species	Location	Stratigraphic position	Material	Notes	Images
Goniopholis	G. crassidens	Hare Farm Lane, Brede			A Goniopholid neosuchian	
Hulkepholis	Indeterminate	Ashdown Brickworks			A goniopholid neosuchian	
Theriosuchus	Indeterminate	Ashdown Brickworks			An atoposaurid neosuchian	
Bernissartiidae	Indeterminate	Ashdown Brickworks				

=== Mammals ===
Mammals reported from the Wadhurst Clay
Genus	Species	Location	Stratigraphic position	Material	Notes	Images
Laolestes	L. hodsoni	Cliff End bonebed, Tighe Farm	Cypridea paulsgrovensis ostracod Zone		A dryolestid mammal	
Spalacotherium	S. tricuspidens	Cliff End bonebed	Cypridea paulsgrovensis ostracod Zone		A spalacotheriid mammal	
Aegialodon	A. dawsoni	Cliff End bonebed	Cypridea paulsgrovensis ostracod Zone		A cladotherian mammal	
Loxaulax	L. valdensis	Cliff End bonebed	Cypridea paulsgrovensis ostracod Zone		A eobataarid multituberculate	

=== Plesiosaurians ===
Plesiosaurians reported from the Wadhurst Clay
Genus	Species	Location	Stratigraphic position	Material	Notes	Images
Hastanectes	H. valdensis	Old Roar Quarry, Hollington Quarry, Black Horse Quarry, Hastings, Brenchley			A leptocleidid plesiosaur	

=== Pterosaurs ===
Pterosaurs reported from the Wadhurst Clay Formation
Genus	Species	Location	Stratigraphic position	Material	Notes	Images
? Istiodactylidae indet.	Indeterminate	Cliff End Bone Bed, Cliff End.		2 isolated tooth crowns (BEXHM: 2022.109.1 & BEXHM: 2022.109.2).	An istiodactylid.	

== See also ==
- Hastings Group
- Ashdown Formation
- Tunbridge Wells Sand Formation
- Geology of East Sussex
