= Ashdown Formation =

Geological unit of the Lower Cretaceous

- Stratigraphic range: Late Berriasian to Valanginian
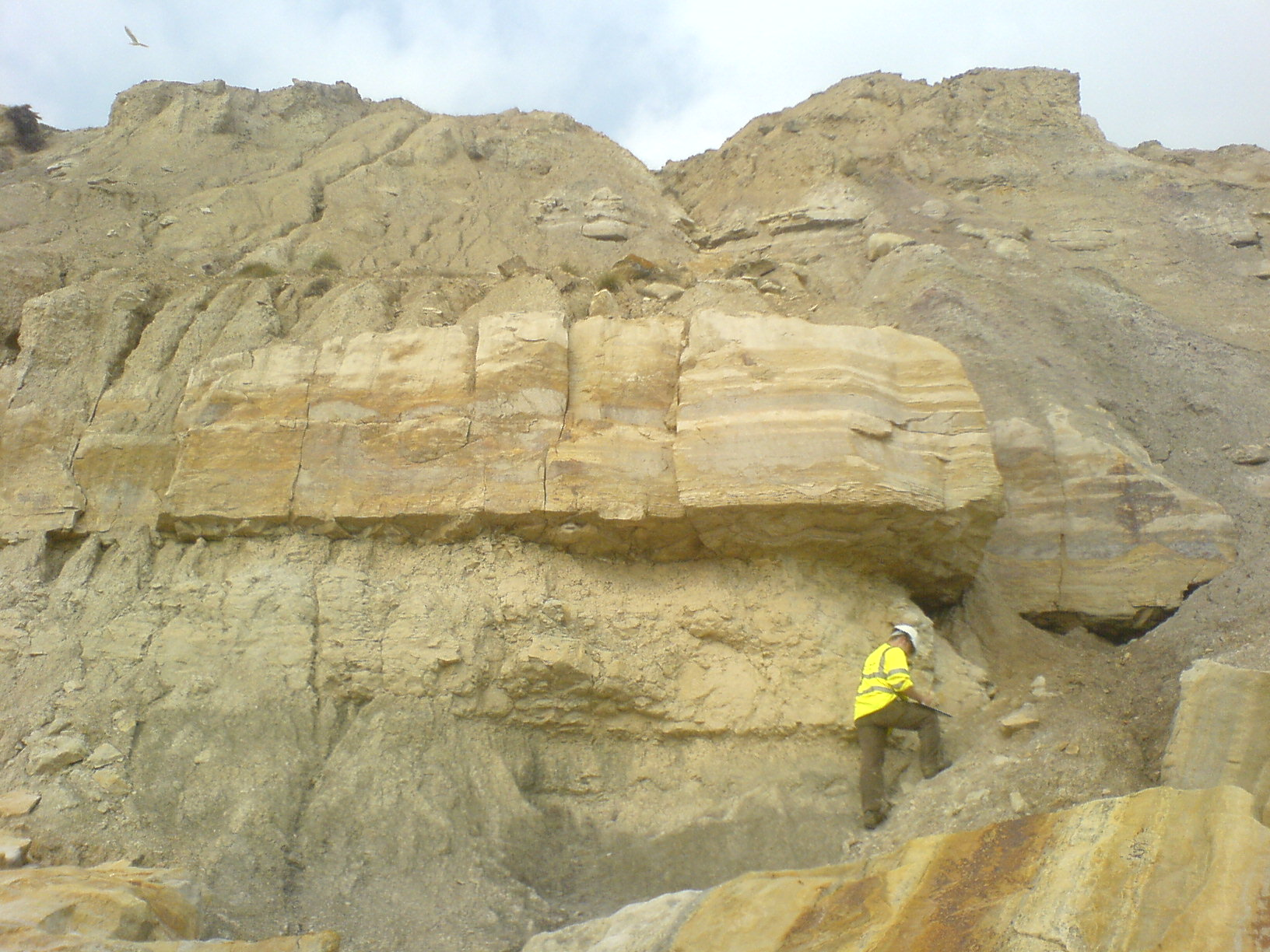
- An exposure of the Ashdown Formation on the East Sussex coast.
- Type: Geological formation
- Unit of: Wealden Group
- Sub-units: Fairlight Clays
- Underlies: Wadhurst Clay Formation
- Overlies: Durlston Formation
- Thickness: typically in the range 200-230 m

Lithology
- Primary: Siltstone, Sandstone
- Other: Mudstone, Clay

Location
- Country: UK
- Extent: Weald Basin

Type section
- Named for: Ashdown Forest

The Ashdown Formation is a geological unit, which forms part of the Wealden Group and the lowermost and oldest part of the now unofficial Hastings Beds. These geological units make up the core of the Weald in the English counties of East Sussex and Kent.

The other component formations of the Hastings Beds are the overlying Wadhurst Clay Formation and the Tunbridge Wells Sand Formation. The Hastings Beds in turn forms part of the Wealden Supergroup which underlies much of South East England. The sediments of the Weald of East Sussex, including the Ashdown Formation, were deposited during the Early Cretaceous Period, which lasted for approximately 40 million years from 140 to 100 million years ago. The Ashdown Formation is of Late Berriasian to Early Valanginian age. The formation takes its name from the Ashdown Forest in the High Weald of Sussex.

== Lithology ==
The Ashdown Formation typically comprises sandstones, siltstones and mudstones. In the east of the county, the formation tends to be more argillaceous in its lowermost part and fines up to a sandier division in the uppermost 30 to 50 metres (98 to 164 ft). The clays are identified by their characteristic purple and brick-red mottled nature. In early references, these variations give rise to the division of the formation into the ‘Fairlight Clays’ and the ‘Ashdown Sands’. However, it is now considered as one due to the impersistence of the clays across the Weald. Despite this the variations of clays and sands in the formation are usually marked separately on the maps and records of the British Geological Survey. In its entirety, the formation is usually found to be between 180 and 215m thick

The base of the Hastings Beds and the Ashdown Formation is taken at the top of the Greys Limestones Member of the Purbeck Group, although this boundary is not currently exposed anywhere in the Weald. The top of the Ashdown Formation is marked as the top of a massive sandstone bed known as the Top Ashdown Sandstone. This is overlain by an easily identified very coarse-grained sandstone known as the Top Ashdown Pebble Bed, which is considered to be part of the overlying Wadhurst Clay Formation. The Top Ashdown Sandstone is the most persistent marker horizon in Early Cretaceous strata throughout the region. It comprises a fine- to medium-grained sandstone ranging in thickness from 1.2m to 8m. Other marker beds can be found throughout the formation, including the Cliff End Sandstone and the Lee Ness Sandstone.

== Hastings to Cliff End ==
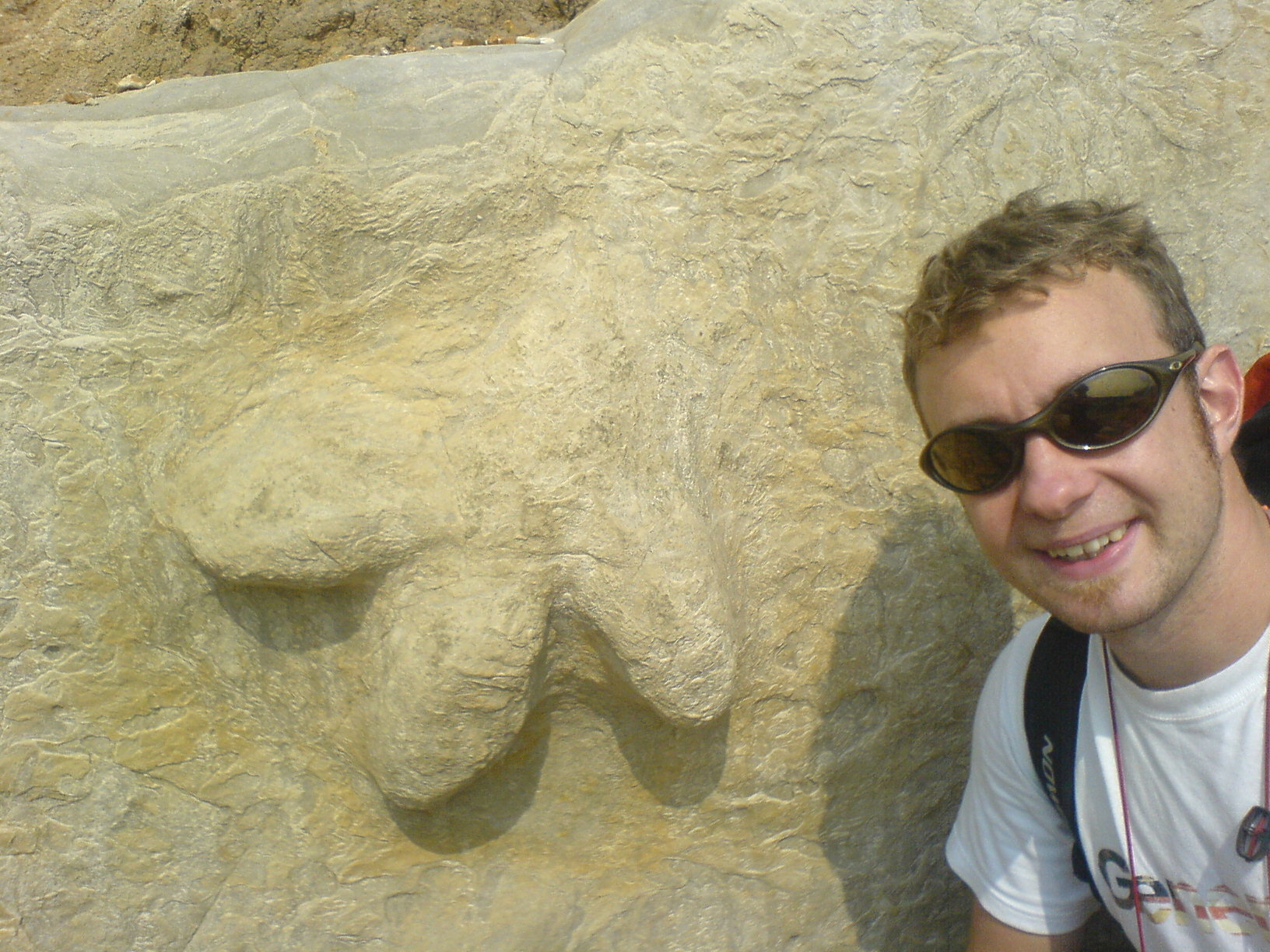
A fossil footprint near Hastings assigned to Iguanodon

The Ashdown Beds are best exposed in the 8 km cliff section between Hastings and Pett Level. Part of this section has been designated a Site of Special Scientific Interest, cited by Natural England because of its geological importance. The cliffs between Hastings and Pett Level are difficult to get to safely because of the tidal range of the English Channel and the unstable cliffs.

At this location, the formation can be followed from the axis of the Wealden Anticline at Lee Ness Ledge through the well-distinguished marker beds and horizons to its juncture with the Wadhurst Clay at Hastings Castle to the west and Cliff End to the east. The mottled, heavily degraded silty clays of the former ‘Fairlight Clays’ can be easily distinguished against the well-bedded sandstones and interbedded siltstones of the ‘Ashdown Sands’.

The Lee Ness Ledge is known for the prominent Lee Ness Sandstone and its many well-preserved fossilised dinosaur footprints, particularly Iguanodon.

== Engineering geology ==
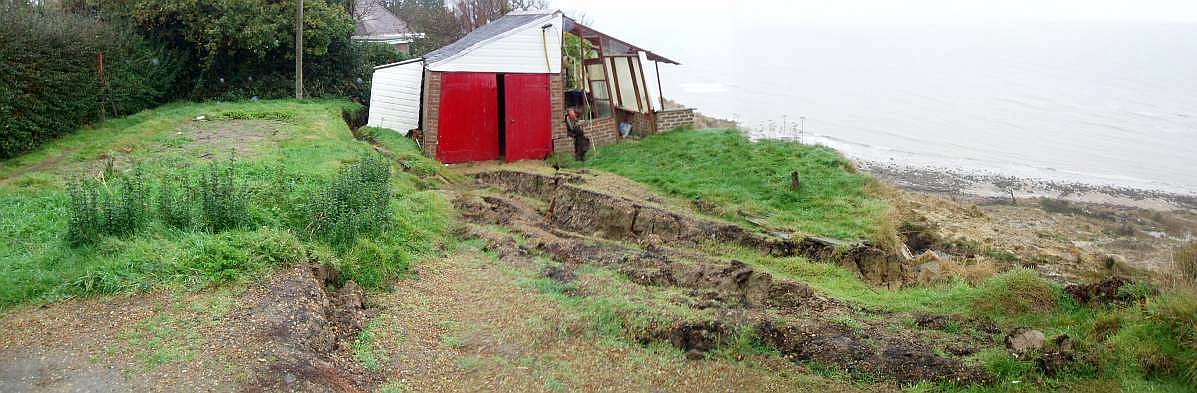
A landslide on the East Sussex coast at Fairlight

The Hastings to Pett Level section of the coast has suffered a number of significant recent and historic landslips, dating back to the 18th century. These can be seen in and around Covehurst Wood and the Fairlight, Ecclesbourne and Warren Glens. This has been attributed to lithological variations of the Ashdown Beds and also to the effects of wave action at the base of the cliffs. At high tide, waves cut into the lowermost, argillaceous part of the cliffs and undercut the overlying sandstones and siltstones, resulting in toppling and rock falls. Where sandstones are interbedded with silts and clays, this may result in single and multiple rotational type landslides as well as block slides and mud flows. In theory, the remains of previous landslips should then protect the toe of the cliff from further weathering. However, these blocks and sediments are transported East with shingle and other beach deposits by longshore drift, leaving the cliffs vulnerable to wave action and susceptible to further landslides.

== See also ==
- Geology of East Sussex
- Hastings Beds
- Tunbridge Wells Sand Formation
- Wadhurst Clay Formation
