= Wealden Group =

Stratigraphic Group in England

- Stratigraphic range: Late Berriasian-Aptian, 140–125 Ma
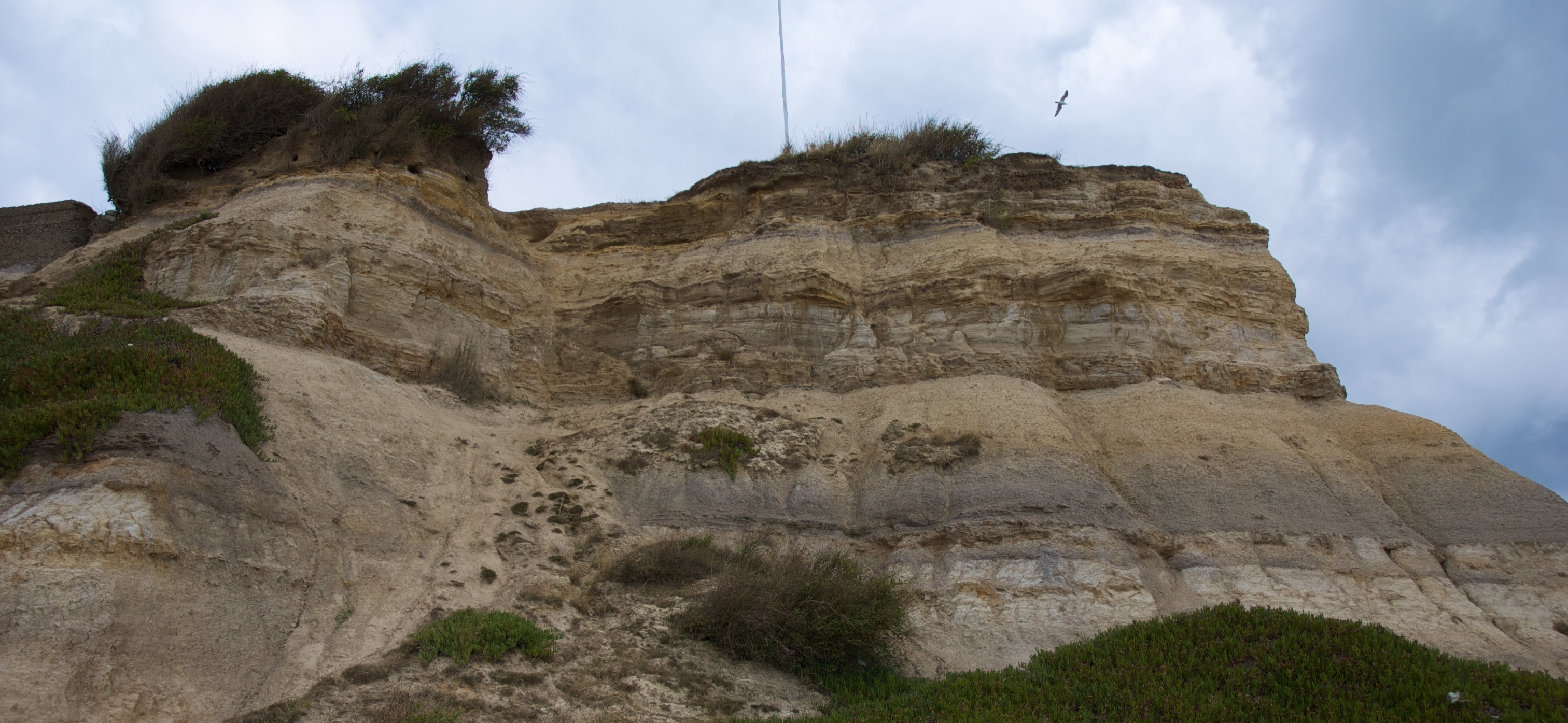
- Coastal exposure of the Wealden Group near Bexhill-on-Sea
- Type: Group
- Sub-units: Weald Basin; Weald Clay Formation; Tunbridge Wells Sand Formation; Wadhurst Clay Formation; Ashdown Formation; Wessex Basin; Vectis Formation; Wessex Formation; Marginal - Whitchurch Sand Formation
- Underlies: Lower Greensand Group
- Overlies: Purbeck Group
- Thickness: Up to 850 m in Weald Basin, c. 500 m in Wessex basin, few m in marginal areas

Location
- Region: England
- Country: United Kingdom

Type section
- Named for: Weald

The Wealden Group, occasionally also referred to as the Wealden Supergroup, is a group (a sequence of rock strata) in the lithostratigraphy of southern England. The Wealden group consists of paralic to continental (freshwater) facies sedimentary rocks of Berriasian to Aptian age and thus forms part of the English Lower Cretaceous. It is composed of alternating sands and clays. The sandy units were deposited in a flood plain of braided rivers, the clays mostly in a lagoonal coastal plain.

The Wealden Group can be found in almost all Early Cretaceous basins of England: its outcrops curve from the Wessex Basin in the south to the Cleveland Basin in the northeast. It is not found in northwest England and Wales, areas which were at the time tectonic highs where no deposition took place. The same is true for the London Platform around London and Essex. Offshore, the Wealden Group can reach a thickness of 700 metres. The terms Wealden and Wealden facies are also used as generic terms referring to Early Cretaceous non-marine sequences elsewhere in Europe.

== Stratigraphy ==
The Wealden Group lies stratigraphically on top of the Purbeck Group, which spans the Jurassic-Cretaceous boundary. Within the Wessex Basin, the Wealden Group consists of two formations: the Wessex Formation and overlying Vectis Formation. In the Weald Basin, the Wealden Group consists of four formations: the Ashdown Formation, the Wadhurst Clay Formation, the Tunbridge Wells Sand Formation and the Weald Clay Formation. The lower three formations are sometimes collectively referred to as the Hastings Beds. In Oxfordshire, Buckinghamshire and Wiltshire, the Wealden Group is only found as an outlier on top of hills and only consists of a single formation, the Whitchurch Sand Formation. In Yorkshire, the equivalently aged Speeton Clay Formation, a marine unit, is present.

On top of the Wealden Group is the Lower Greensand Group. The difference between these two groups has been formed by a major eustatic (global) transgression of the sea. The Greensand (Aptian/Albian in age) consists of marine deposits.

The sequence in the Weald Basin has also been described as a supergroup, containing the Weald Clay Group and Hastings Group.

== Palaeontology ==
The Wealden Group forms outcrops covering a large part of south and south-eastern England including the Isle of Wight. It takes its name from the Weald region of Kent, Sussex, Surrey and Hampshire. It has yielded many fossils, including dinosaurs like Iguanodon and Hypsilophodon. Apart from fossils, it shows many other signs of being deposited in a continental environment, such as mudcracks and -in some rare cases- dinosaur footprints. Taxa included in the table below have an uncertain provenance and cannot be placed into one of the constituent formations, thus they are placed here.

=== Pterosaurs ===
Pterosaurs reported from the Wealden Group
Genus	Species	Location	Stratigraphic position	Material	Notes	Images
Coloborhynchus	C. clavirostris	St.-Leonards-on-Sea	Hastings Beds	"Anterior portion of rostrum"	An ornithocheirid pterosaur.	Coloborhynchus

=== Dinosaurs ===
Dinosaurs reported from the Wealden Group
Genus	Species	Location	Stratigraphic position	Material	Notes	Images
Regnosaurus	R. northamptoni	Cuckfield		An incomplete right mandible	Traditionally regarded as a stegosaur, but later as a dubious, indeterminate thyreophoran	
Thecospondylus	T. horneri	Kent	Hastings Beds	"Internal mold of sacrum."	Dubious genus that has been variously classified as either a saurischian or ornithischian. It is currently only tentatively regarded as dinosaurian.	
Therosaurus	T. anglicus	West Sussex				
Altispinax	A. dunkeri	East Sussex	Hastings Beds	"Dorsal vertebrae."		
Haestasaurus	H. becklesii	East Sussex	Hastings Beds	Forelimb	A ?basal macronarian	
Pleurocoelus	P. valdensis	East Sussex; West Sussex			A dubious basal titanosauriform	
Turiasauria	Indeterminate		Hasting beds?	Vertebra		
Theropoda	Indeterminate	West Sussex, East Sussex, Kent				
Xenoposeidon	X. proneneukos				A rebbachisaurid sauropod	

== Wealden elsewhere in Europe ==
The term "Wealden" and "Wealden facies" has been applied to other Lower Cretaceous sequences in Europe, including the "German Wealden", comprising the Berriasian aged Bückeberg Formation of the Lower Saxony Basin and in Belgium, where "Wealden facies" has been used as a term to refer to the Barremian-Aptian aged sequences of the Mons Basin, including the Sainte-Barbe Clays Formation where large numbers of Iguanodon were found in the 19th century.

== See also ==
- List of dinosaur-bearing rock formations
