= Geology of Snowdonia National Park =

Overview of geology in Snowdonia, Wales

Snowdonia National Park location map

The geology of Snowdonia National Park in North Wales is dominated by sedimentary and volcanic rocks from the Cambrian and Ordovician periods with intrusions of Ordovician and Silurian age. There are Silurian and Cenozoic sedimentary rocks on the park's margins. The succession was intensely faulted and folded during the Caledonian Orogeny. The region was uplifted as the North Atlantic Ocean opened during the Cenozoic. The current mountainous landscape arises from repeated glaciations during the Quaternary period.

== Overview ==
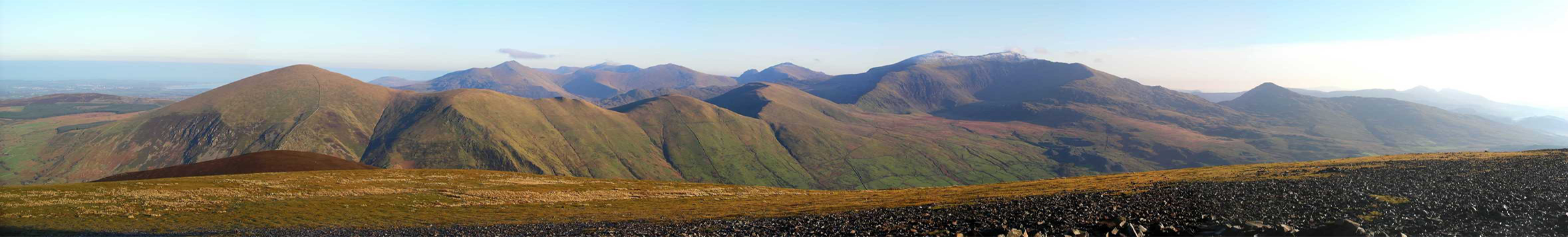
Panorama of part of the Snowdon Massif including Snowdon (centre right) taken from Mynydd Mawr. The Glyderau are visible in the distance.

The bedrock geology of Snowdonia is largely formed from a sequence of sedimentary and igneous rocks originating during the early Palaeozoic (the Cambrian, Ordovician and Silurian periods, lasting between 539 and 419 million years ago). The Cambrian and Ordovician rocks accumulated largely on the Avalon terrane, a piece of the Earth's crust which was involved in the Caledonian Orogeny roughly 490–390 million years ago, a long drawn-out continental collision which resulted in their being intensely faulted and folded and subjected to low-grade metamorphism. Deposition of sedimentary rocks continued in the Snowdonia district through the Silurian period during and after the collision which produced the new continent of Laurussia.

During the Cambrian and Ordovician, sandstones and mudstones were laid down within the Welsh Basin, a relatively shallow marginal area of a broader and deeper ocean known as the Iapetus Ocean, which lay to the north. Variations in water depth over this time, related both to crustal extension and to the growth and decline of a south polar ice-sheet, gave rise to changes in conditions of deposition and hence a varying rock sequence. Volcanic activity began in the Ordovician period as ocean crust was subducted to the northwest of Snowdonia and continued into the early Silurian until continental collision had ceased. The nature of the volcanism and hence the character of both extrusive and intrusive igneous rocks varied over time. Most of Snowdonia is thought to have remained as land during the succeeding few hundred million years before being submerged during the Jurassic period though, with one marginal exception, no rocks dating from the Devonian onwards remain. Cardigan Bay developed as a depositional basin during the Mesozoic and some of those sediments are recorded within Snowdonia's boundaries, albeit concealed at depth.

Many of the formations and groups recorded within Snowdonia are not laterally extensive and so the full sequence described below is not present in its entirety in any one area. Various authors have applied different names to the rock strata of the area over time to an extent that is potentially confusing. The early Ordovician 'Nant Ffrancon' label for example has enjoyed both formation and group status at different times whereas it is currently classed as a subgroup.

== Cambrian ==
The oldest rocks present at the surface are of early Cambrian age. They are exposed primarily across the Harlech Dome and along the national park's northwestern boundary. A series of different lithologies, all assigned to the Harlech Grits Group, are exposed within this structure. The oldest exposed rocks at the core of the dome are the interbedded sandstones and siltstones of the Dolwen Formation, dating from the Comley epoch. They are interpreted as having been laid down within a river delta. These are overlain by the blue and purple siltstones and mudstones of the Llanbedr Formation which are in turn overlaid by the sandstones and conglomerates of the Rhinog (or Rhinog Grits) Formation, interpreted as turbidites accumulating in a series of submarine fans. As the name suggests, these rocks form the craggy peaks of Rhinog Fawr, Rhinog Fach and Y Llethr. Stratigraphically above these are the middle Cambrian age manganese-bearing Hafotty, Barmouth (Grits), Gamlan and Clogau formations, all but the last of which are also assigned to the Harlech Grits.

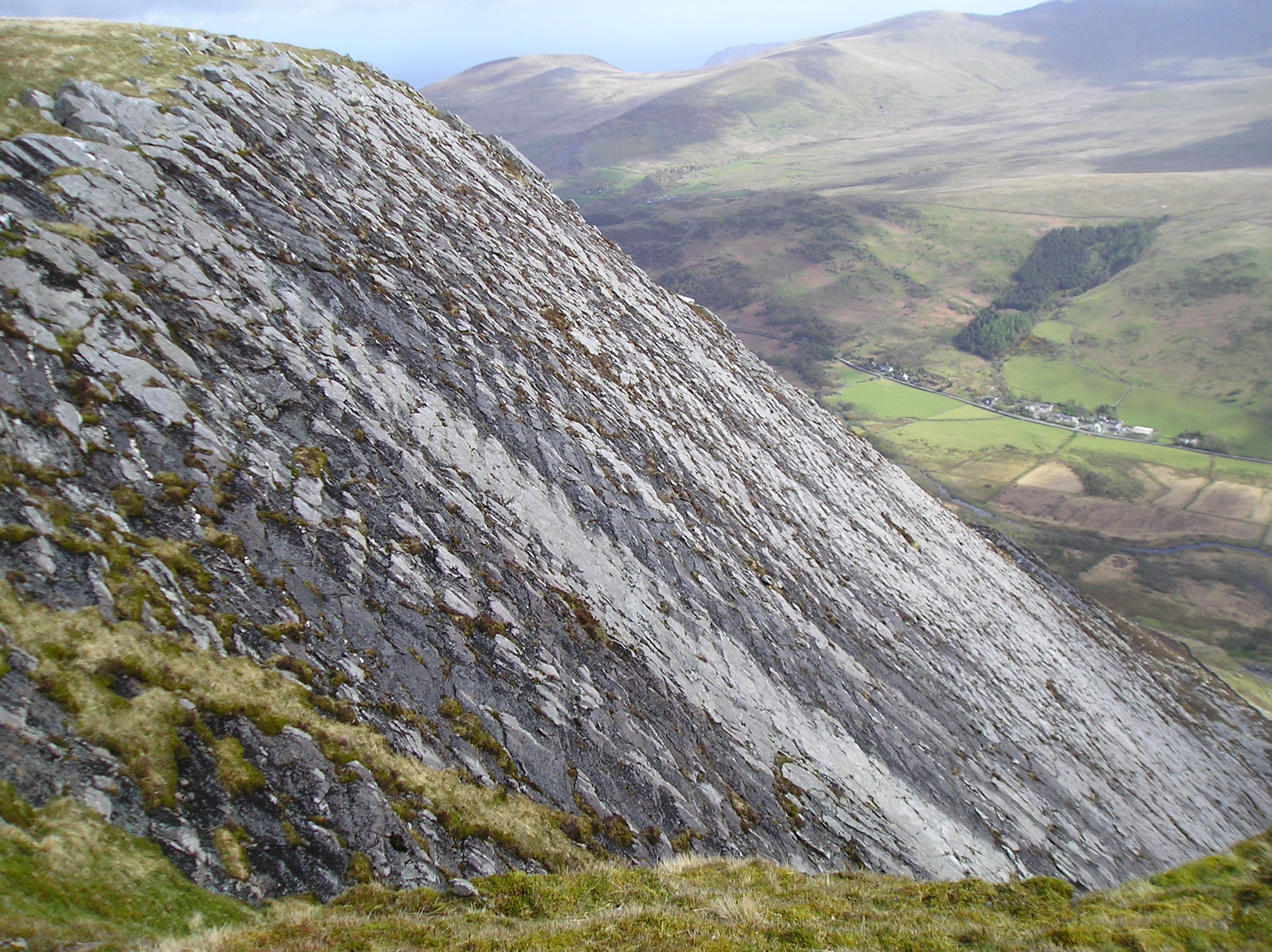
Ripple marks in Cambrian sandstone at "Atlantic Slab", Cwm Graianog

The Clogau Formation, a thickness of black mudstones, together with the late Cambrian age Maentwrog, Ffestiniog Flags and Dolgellau formations are assigned to the Mawddach Group. These too are largely turbidites though the Dolgellau Formation is a dark pyritic mudstone. The exposures of Cambrian age rocks along the park's northwestern boundary differ though the rocks of the lowermost Fachwen Formation can be equated to those of the Dolwen Formation, similarly the Llanberis Slates Formation can be correlated with the rocks of the Llanbedr Formation. The middle Cambrian succession is missing here and the upper Cambrian succession locally comprises the sandstones of the Bronllwyd Grits Formation and the overlying mudstones, siltstones and sandstones of the Marchlyn Formation, correlating with the Ffestiniog Flags. The uppermost part of the Marchlyn, a series of interbedded sandstones and conglomerates, are referred to as the Carnedd y Filiast Grit. An outcrop of this grit at Cwm Graianog displays distinctive ripple-marked bedding on an inclined bedding plane known to rock-climbers as 'Atlantic Slab' (Welsh: Llechen Cytrolar).

== Ordovician ==
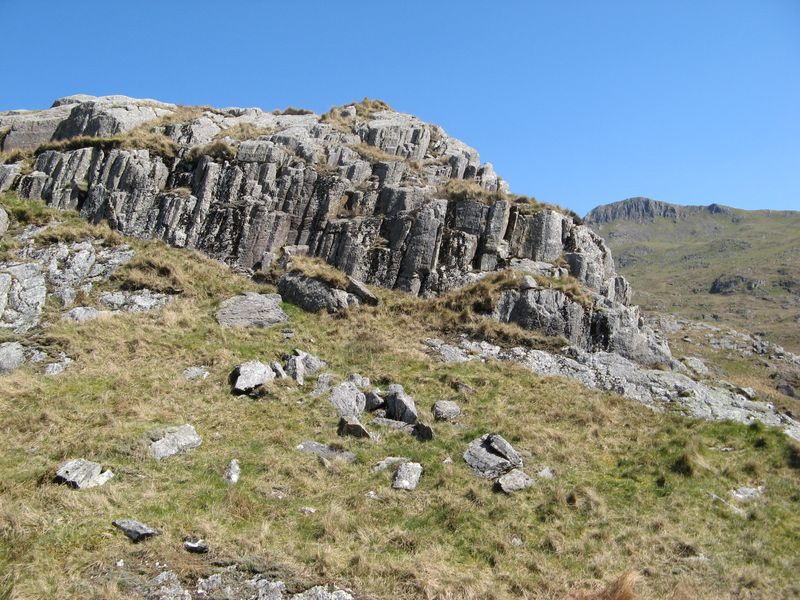
Columnar jointing in the Lower Rhyolitic Tuff Formation (Ordovician age)

Much of the rest of the succession is of Ordovician age, comprising both a thick sedimentary succession together with a range of volcanic rocks. There are also a number of intrusive bodies of Ordovician age. The lowermost Ordovician rocks are the marine mudstones of the Dol-cyn-afon Formation, which outcrop around the Harlech Dome. The formation also includes sandstones and siltstones and has been subjected to low-grade metamorphism. Overlying these strata are the shallow marine siltstones of the Nant Ffrancon Subgroup, seen for example in their type area on the south side of Nant Ffrancon but extending from the coast around Penmaenmawr roughly around the edge of the national park to the Tremadog area. They occur in a broad band around the northern and eastern sides of the Harlech Dome, extending as far east as Llangwm.

Intrusive igneous rocks of Ordovician age are plentiful. The dolerites (microgabbro or diabase) are relatively resistant to erosion and so provide prominent features in the landscape such as the cliffs of Dinas Mot in the Llanberis Pass and those of Craig Bwlch-y-moch, Craig y Castell and Craig y Gesail near Tremadog.

== Silurian ==
Silurian sedimentary rocks, of both Llandovery and Wenlock age, are found along the eastern and southern margins of the park. Bodies of intrusive igneous rocks of Silurian age wrap around the margins of the Harlech Dome and are frequently exposed within the northern mountains. Rocks of the Cwmere, Derwenlas, Cwmsymlog, Devil's Bridge and Borth Mudstones formations occur along the Dovey valley.

== Younger rocks ==
There are no late Palaeozoic rocks known within Snowdonia nor are there any of Mesozoic or Cenozoic age exposed at the surface. However, the sinking of a borehole at Mochras on the coast south of Harlech revealed a previously unknown succession of Mesozoic and Cenozoic rock strata, hidden by a thick cover of superficial deposits. This concealed succession on the Cardigan Bay coast includes Lower, Middle and Upper Lias from the Jurassic period amounting to the thickest Jurassic rock pile known in Britain. It is unconformably overlain by Middle Oligocene to Lower Miocene age strata (Palaeogene and Neogene periods), all deposited within a half-graben whose eastern edge is the Mochras fault.

== Quaternary ==
There were successive glaciations of Britain's uplands within the Quaternary Period, and each one affected Snowdonia.

=== Devensian glaciation ===
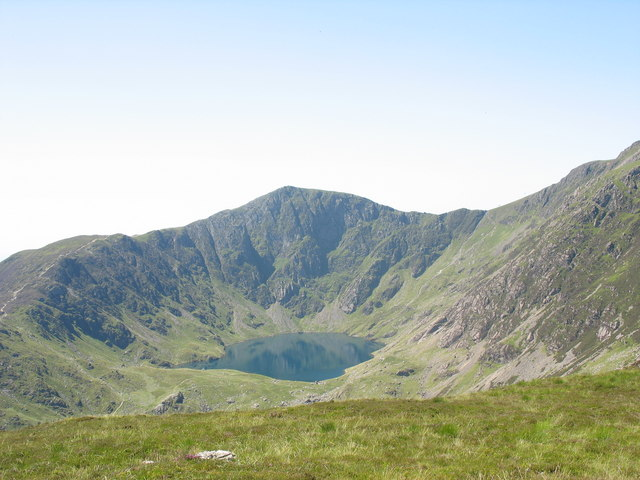
Cirque filled by Llyn Cau

The main period for which there is evidence of the glaciation of Snowdonia is the Devensian (the name for the last glacial period in Britain). Dozens of glacial cirques were excavated. Among these are:

- Those holding the lakes of Llyn Cau and Llyn y Gadair on Cadair Idris, Glaslyn and Llyn Du'r Arddu on Snowdon,
- Cwm Idwal within the Glyder Fawr and Glyder Fach range,
- those holding Dulyn and Melynllyn lakes in the Carneddau.

Major U-shaped valleys or "glacial troughs" developed at this time include the Nant Ffrancon Pass, Llanberis Pass and Nant Gwynant. Some still host lakes formed within glacially excavated bedrock hollows, such as those of Llyn Peris and Llyn Gwynant. Till is widespread though patchy; the largest extents are around Dyffryn Ardudwy and the margins of the Carneddau.

=== Alluvium ===
There are deposits of alluvium — river laid sand, silt and gravel — along the floors of most of the larger valleys, though these are typically narrow and discontinuous in their extent. At their seaward ends they merge with estuarine deposits.

=== Peat ===
Peat has accumulated in the post-glacial period though typically in isolated patches within this mountainous landscape. One of the larger deposits is at Waun y Griafolen east of Coed y Brenin.

=== Landslides ===
Examples of mass movement are not common in Snowdonia but there is a concentration along the glacially excavated Bala lineament through Talyllyn. The largest is that which originates on the steep northwest slopes of Graig Goch and which has resulted in a mass of debris up to 30m high covering the otherwise flat floor of this trough and behind which is the lake. There are further smaller examples which form Bwlch Cyfyng southwest of Abergynolwyn and on the southeastern slopes of Mynydd Gwerngraig east of Cadair Idris. A further mass of slipped material is recorded beneath the peak of Pen yr Helgi Du at the head of Cwm Eigiau.

=== Coastal features ===
There are extensive tracts of 'blown sand' along the coast, particularly forming Morfa Harlech and Morfa Dyffryn. Occurrences of lesser extent are found at Barmouth, immediately north and south of Tywyn and west of Aberdyfi. There are also extensive marine deposits inland of the sand dune systems around Tywyn and surrounding Broad Water, an inland widening of the Dysynni Valley. The low ground at Fairbourne is of similar origin, so too at Mochras and at Traeth Bach and inland of Porthmadog. Though not strictly within the national park, offshore and usually submerged beneath the surface waters of Cardigan Bay are several ridges of cobbles and pebbles traditionally associated with legends such as those around Cantre'r Gwaelod but recognised today as medial moraines of glacial origin. Sarn Badrig is the most well-known, running southwest from Mochras. Sarn y Bwch is a similar but smaller feature extending in the same direction from the low headland at Tonfanau, north of Tywyn. The rock debris which forms these two 'sarnau' (Welsh: 'causeways') and a third to the south derives from the mountainous hinterland to their east.

== Structure ==
The area was intensely faulted and folded during the Caledonian Orogeny. Amongst structures from that period are the major lineament-forming Bala Fault / Tal-y-llyn Fault and the Pennal Fault along which the Dovey valley has been carved by water and ice. Numerous other faults ranging from north–south to NE - SW alignments are present throughout the district. Much of northern Snowdonia is characterised by large scale folds, the majority of which have a NE-SW aligned fold axis. Key examples include the Moel Hebog Syncline, Capel Curig Anticline and the Snowdon Syncline; the fold axis passes along the ridge of Bwlch Main and through the summit.

== Mineralisation ==
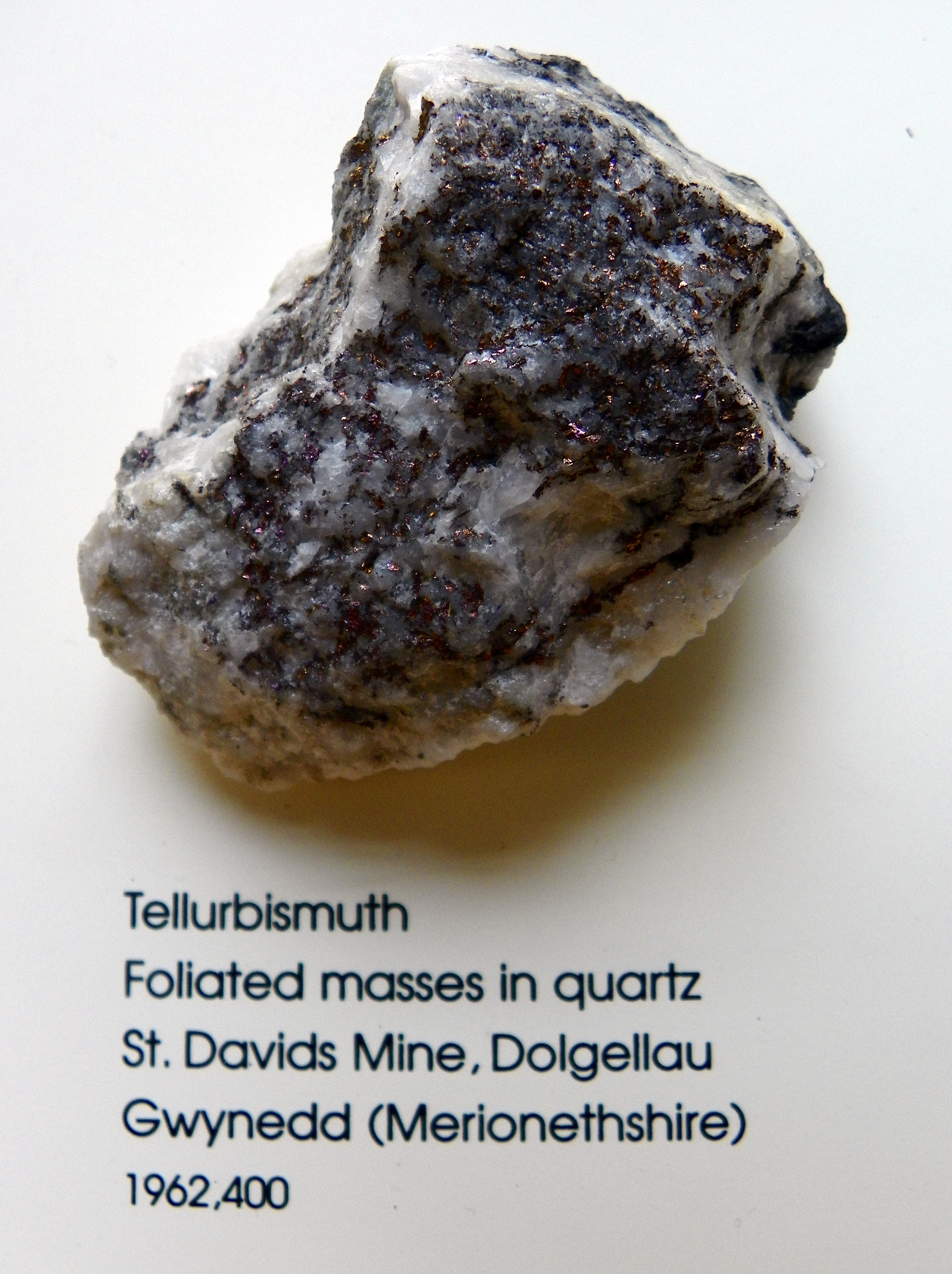
Tellurbismuth with quartz, from Dolgellau in Snowdonia National Park

There are iron-bearing veins within the Nant Ffrancon mudstones at Tremadog. In the Snowdon area there are occurrences of copper, lead and zinc mineralisation above Glaslyn, on the eastern flanks of Lliwedd and east of Yr Aran. There are further metalliferous veins east of Beddgelert. These minerals plus gold are known from veins in the Barmouth area.

== Economic geology ==
The history of mining and quarrying in Snowdonia is a long one.

=== Metal mining ===
Copper, gold, iron, zinc, manganese and lead have been exploited commercially. The Romans were mining copper in Nant Gwynant and the Sygun Mine operated in the Beddgelert area during the C19th, closing in 1903 as reserves approached exhaustion. Manganese-bearing strata are known within the Rhinogydd and a former manganese mine is recorded at Mochowgryn southwest of Arenig Fach.

=== Slate ===
The exploitation of the Cambrian and Ordovician slates began in earnest in the midst of the nineteenth century. Its primary use was for roofing tiles but it is extensively used locally in buildings and in slate fencing. Snowdonia's many heritage railways largely originate from this industry.

=== Other building stone ===
Many older buildings and field walls have been constructed from locally sourced stone from riverbeds and hillsides.

== Conservation ==
Numerous sites and landscapes within Snowdonia are afforded statutory protection for their geological interest. These include SSSIs and RIGS.

== Interpretation ==
Wales' National Slate Museum was established at Llanberis in 1972 as the North Wales Quarrying Museum. An interpretive facility was developed at Ogwen Cottage in 2013 by the Snowdonia National Park Authority focussing on Darwin's journey through Snowdonia in 1831 and serving as an introduction to the area's geology. Parts of the national park and the surrounding area were designated as The Slate Landscape of North West Wales by UNESCO in July 2021, becoming Wales' fourth World Heritage Site.
