= Aran Volcanic Group =

Geologic formation in Wales

- Stratigraphic range: Ordovician
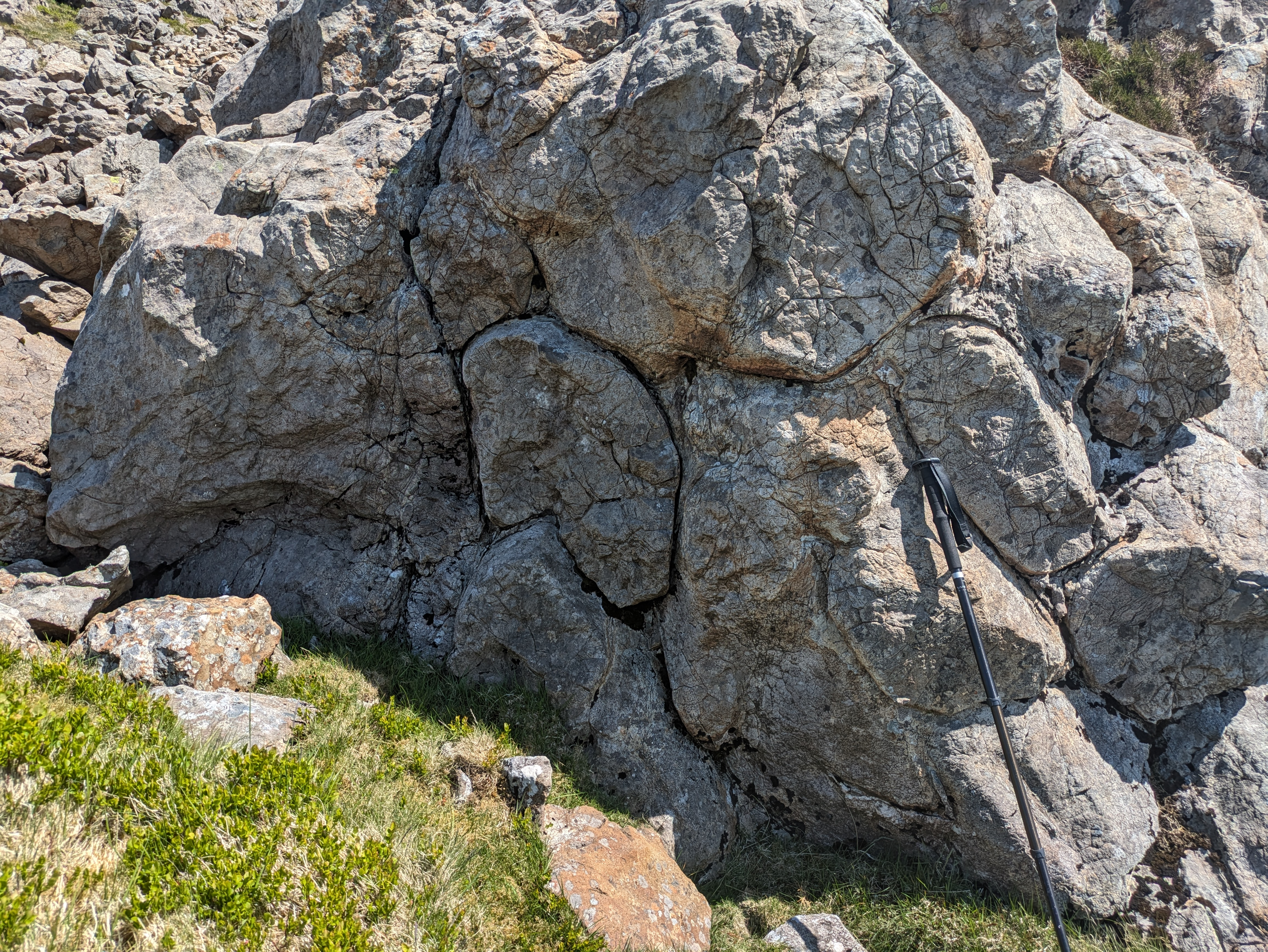
- Pillow lava of the Pen-y-gadair Volcanic Formation near the summit of Cadair Idris
- Type: Group
- Sub-units: Aran Fawddwy Formation, Benglog Formation, Brithion Formation, Craig Cau Formation, Craig y Ffynnon Formation, Cregennen Formation, Llyn y Gafr Volcanic Formation, Melau Formation, Offrwm Volcanic Formation, Pen-y-gadair Volcanic Formation, Pistyllion Formation, Rhiw Bach Volcanic Formation
- Underlies: Ceiswyn Formation
- Overlies: Mawddach Group, Rhobell Volcanic Group
- Thickness: up to 2.5 km

Lithology
- Primary: Basalt, Rhyolite, Volcaniclastics and Sedimentary rock

Location
- Country: Wales
- Extent: Harlech Dome

Type section
- Named for: Aran mountain range

The Aran Volcanic Group is a geological group in Wales. It preserves fossils dated to the Ordovician period. It is laterally equivalent with sedimentary rocks of the Ogwen Group, parts of which are interbedded with it.

== See also ==
- List of fossiliferous stratigraphic units in Wales
