= Glyn Gower Formation =

Geological formation in Wales

- Stratigraphic range: Ordovician
- Type: Formation

Location
- Region: Wales
- Country: United Kingdom

The Glyn Gower Formation is a geologic formation in Wales. It preserves fossils dating back to the Ordovician period. The formation, which is still widely called the Glyn Gower Siltstones in modern British Geological Survey usage, is a 130–150 metre-thick package of ash-rich silty mudstones that crops out around the Bala Fault Zone of north-central Wales. Deposited in a warm, shallow sea late in the Caradoc (Sandbian) Age, the Glyn Gower beds are neatly sandwiched between two thin volcanic-ash layers that serve as natural time-stamps. Within this ash-bounded slice, mudstones teem with fossils—shell-bearing brachiopods, armoured trilobites and the pencil-thin graptolite Diplograptus foliaceus, whose first appearance lets geologists match these rocks to others of exactly the same age.

== Geological overview ==
The unit sits near the top of the Bala succession: Cefn Gwyn Tuff (an air-fall ash derived from a north-easterly volcanic centre) marks its base, while the Frondderw Tuff caps the sequence; both tuffs have geochemical fingerprints that tie the beds to the Ceiswyn volcanic arc. Between these markers the formation consists of rhythmically laminated grey siltstones and very fine sandstones, punctuated by thin crystal tuffs and rare calcareous horizons. Texturally the rocks record waning storm currents and hemipelagic settling on an outer-shelf ramp that was slowly drowning during a eustatic high-stand, a trend also seen in the coeval Ceiswyn mudstones farther west. Facies analysis shows a gradual up-section increase in hemipelagic mud and a decline in storm-generated ripples, consistent with deepening water and reduced oxygenation on the sea-floor.

Biostratigraphically the beds fall within the mid-Burrellian (Soudleyan) sub-stage of the British Caradoc, equivalent to the late Sandbian (about 458–456 million years ago). The shelly fauna—dominated by dalmanellid, strophomenid and orthid brachiopods together with asaphid–illaenid trilobites—sits immediately above the first appearance of Diplograptus foliaceus, providing a reliable datum that links shallow-water carbonate sandbodies east of Bala with deeper mud-rich successions in Snowdonia. These fossils, combined with radiometric dates from the bounding tuffs, allow the Glyn Gower to serve as a shelf reference section for correlating late Caradoc terrigenous–volcanic cycles across the Welsh Basin. Compared with the organic-rich black slates of the laterally equivalent Nod Glas Formation, the Glyn Gower records a more oxic, storm-agitated setting on the footslope of the Aran volcanic high.

Modern British Geological Survey mapping treats the beds as the Glyn Gower Siltstones Member of the Ceiswyn Formation, but the historical formation name is retained in much of the literature and in the 1:50,000 Bala Sheet. Its practical importance lies in the distinctive ash markers: the lower tuff crops out along the A494 road cut north-east of Llanuwchllyn, while the upper tuff can be traced for more than 5 km along strike, making the interval a convenient field laboratory for studying Caradoc sea-level changes, volcanism and benthic ecosystem turnover in the Welsh Basin.

== See also ==
- List of fossiliferous stratigraphic units in Wales
