= High Tor =

High Tor may refer to:

- High Tor (play), a 1936 play by Maxwell Anderson, later adapted to a musical TV film
- High Tor (album), the 1956 soundtrack album of the musical TV film.
- High Tor State Park, a state park in Rockland County, New York, United States
- High Tor Limestone, a geological formation in Wales, UK
- High Tor, a cliff-face in Matlock Bath, Derbyshire, UK
- High Tor, locality in Saskatchewan
