= Graig Goch =

- Graig Goch seen from the west

Highest point
- Elevation: 586 m (1,923 ft)
- Prominence: 130 m (430 ft)
- Coordinates: 52.6584°N 3.9013°W

Naming
- English translation: red cliff
- Language of name: Welsh

Geography
- Location: Gwynedd, Wales
- OS grid: SH715085
- Topo map: OS Landranger 124 / Explorer OL23

Graig Goch is a 586m high hill in the Gwynedd area in Wales and lying within Snowdonia National Park. The hill falls within the communities of Llanfihangel-y-Pennant and Corris, the summit being located in the former. The hill takes the form of a NE-SW aligned ridge with a broad top which rise to subsidiary tops either side of the main summit. These are the 540m+ top of Mynydd Cedris (OS grid ref SH 707080) and the 504m top of Mynydd Rugog (OS grid ref SH 722092). The hill’s most notable feature is the large cliff which stretches the length of its northwestern face overlooking Tal-y-llyn, in part a major rock-slope failure.

== Geology ==
The hill is formed from a succession of mudstones and siltstones laid down by turbidity currents during the Ordovician Period. The main ridge is developed in rocks of the Ceiswyn Formation assigned to the Ogwen Group and dating from around 457 to 454 million years ago. A near vertical cleavage is developed in the steeply southeasterly dipping strata. Talus slopes (scree) lie beneath the main cliff, the massive landslip of part of which some time after the last ice age blocked the valley and is responsible for the presence of Tal-y-llyn Lake. The lake occupies a deep glacial trench excavated along the line of the Tal-y-llyn Fault.

== Access ==
Other than the afforested parts of its southern slopes and parts of its lowermost northern slopes, the entire hill is mapped as open country under the Countryside and Rights of Way Act 2000 thereby giving the public extensive rights to wander at will across it. There are no recorded public rights of way on the hill.
