= Mach Loop =

UK low-level aircraft training area

Coordinates: 52°42′31″N 3°50′42″W

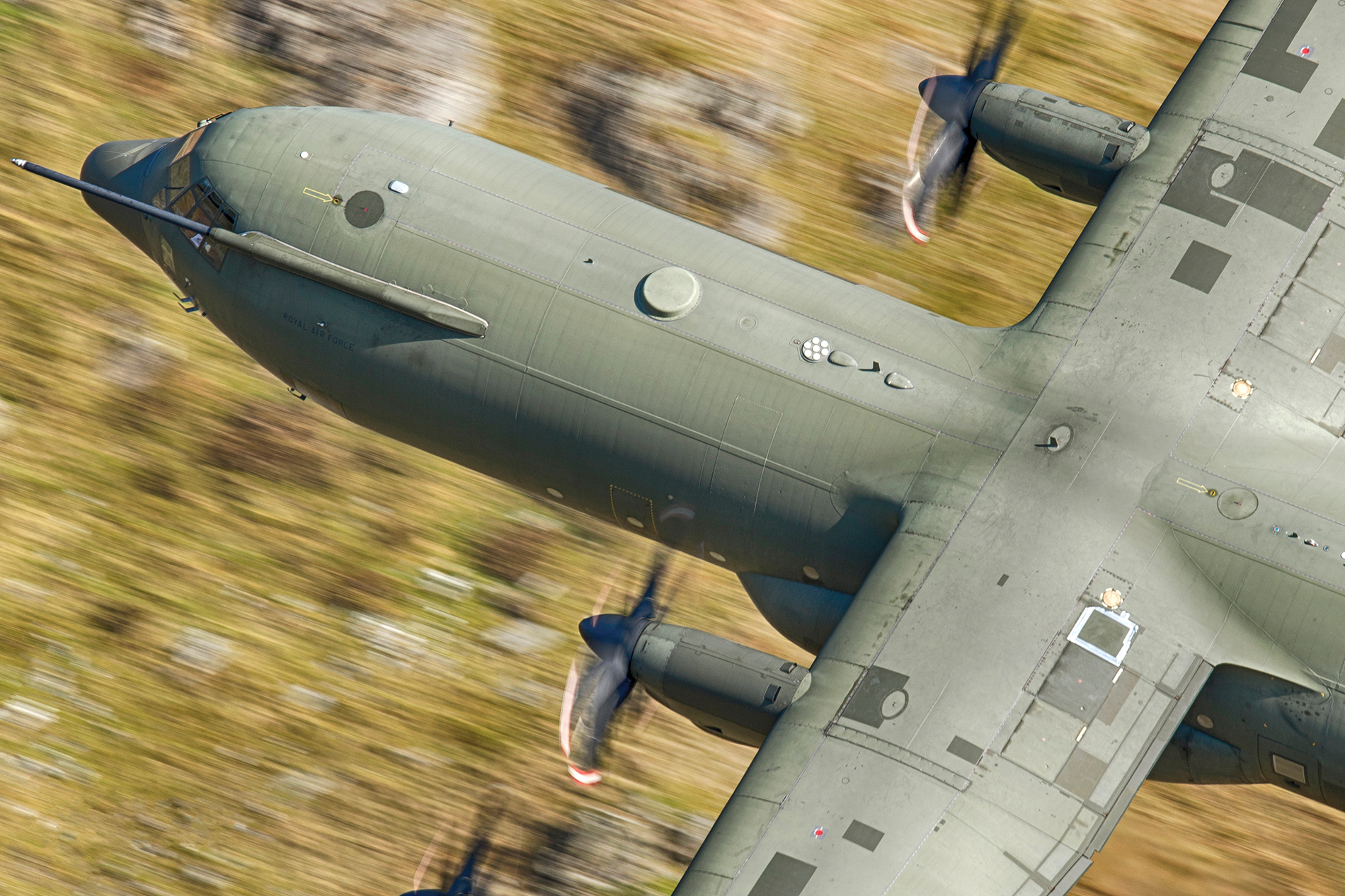
A Lockheed C-130 Hercules passing through the Mach Loop, as photographed from a promontory.

Location in Wales

The Mach Loop (Welsh: Dolen Mach; also known as the Machynlleth Loop, Welsh: Dolen Machynlleth) is a series of valleys in west-central Wales, in the United Kingdom, notable for their use as low-level training areas for fast aircraft. The system of valleys lies 13 km (8 mi) east of Barmouth between the towns of Dolgellau to the north and Machynlleth to the south, from the latter of which it takes its name. The training area is part of the United Kingdom Low Flying System and lies within Low Flying Area 7 (LFA7), which covers all of Wales.

== Activity ==
Aircraft seen in the area include Royal Air Force Airbus A400M, Typhoon, Hawk, F-35A/B jets and Texan T1s, as well as U.S. Air Force F-15C Eagles and F-15E Strike Eagles which are based at RAF Lakenheath and MC-130 and V-22 Osprey from RAF Mildenhall. Aircraft from other nations have been sighted training in the Mach Loop, such as Royal Canadian Air Force CT 114 Tutor (in Snowbird livery) and CF-18 Hornet, and F-16 Fighting Falcons of the Belgian Air Component.

In December 2018, a recommendation was circulated within the Ministry of Defence (MoD) which resulted in a reduction in the number of aircraft using the Mach Loop. In addition to this, all non-UK based aircraft are also prohibited from using the Loop unless part of a UK exercise.

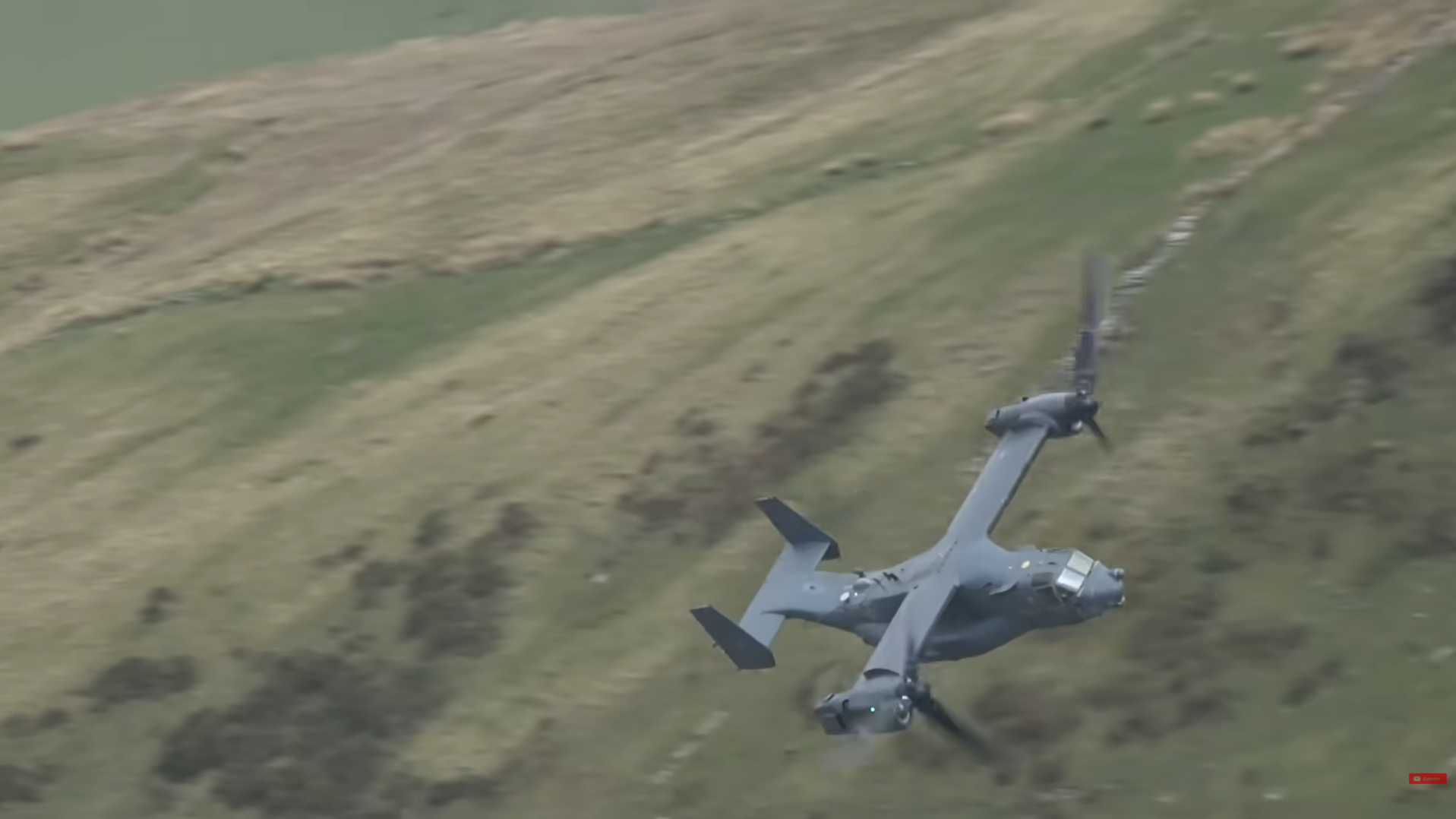
A V22 Osprey flying low through the Mach Loop

== Photography ==
The Mach Loop is particularly popular with plane spotters and photographers, as it is among the few places in the world where visitors can see combat aircraft flying below them. One popular viewing point is the carpark located on the site of Llyn y Tri Greyenyn.

== See also ==
- Rainbow Canyon (California)
