= Plas Uchaf Formation =

Geologic formation in Wales

- Stratigraphic range: Ordovician
- Type: Formation

Location
- Region: Wales
- Country: United Kingdom

The Plas Uchaf Formation is a geologic formation in Wales. It preserves fossils dating back to the Ordovician period.

== See also ==
- List of fossiliferous stratigraphic units in Wales
