= Low flying military training =

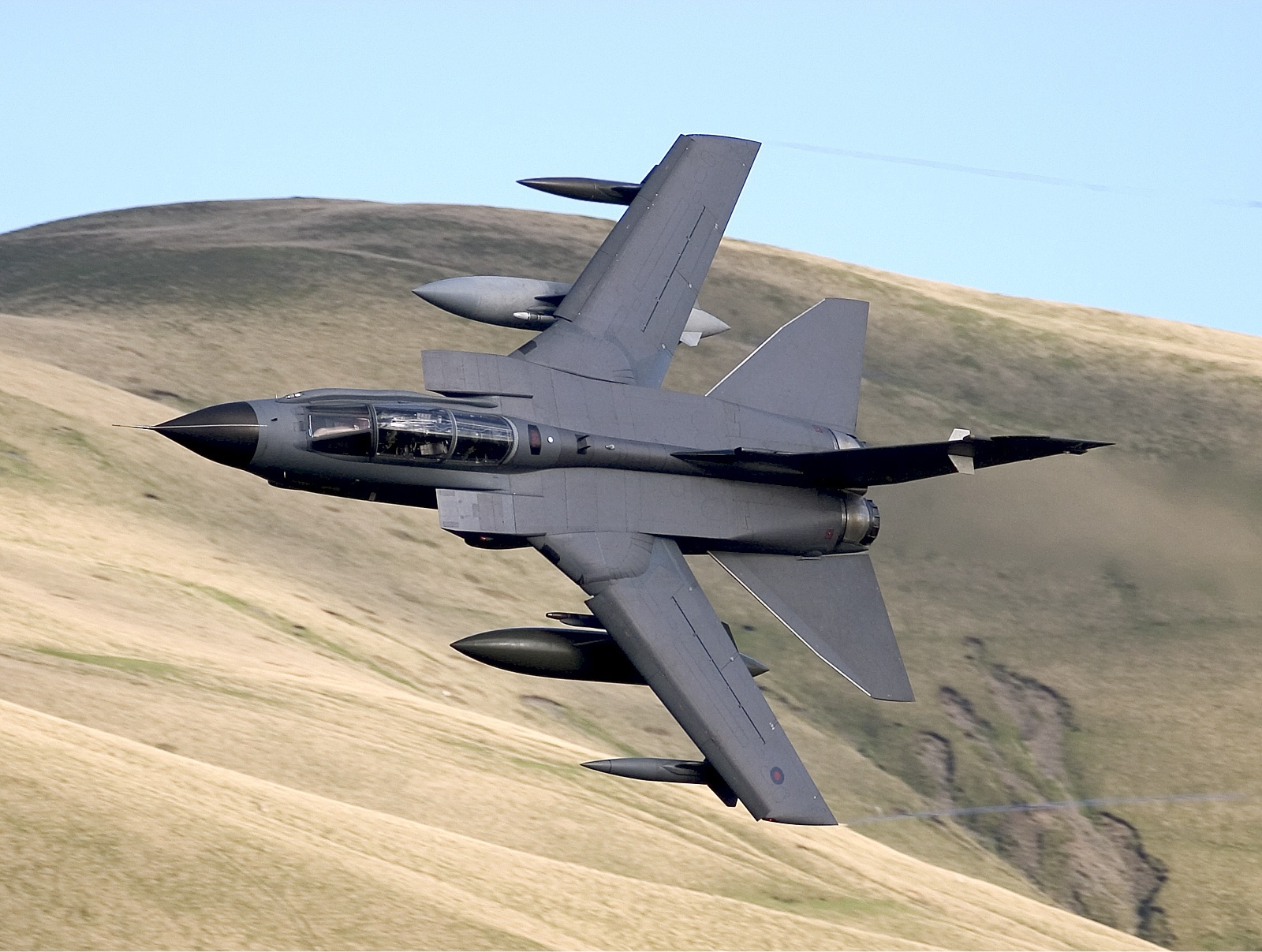
A Royal Air Force Panavia Tornado GR4

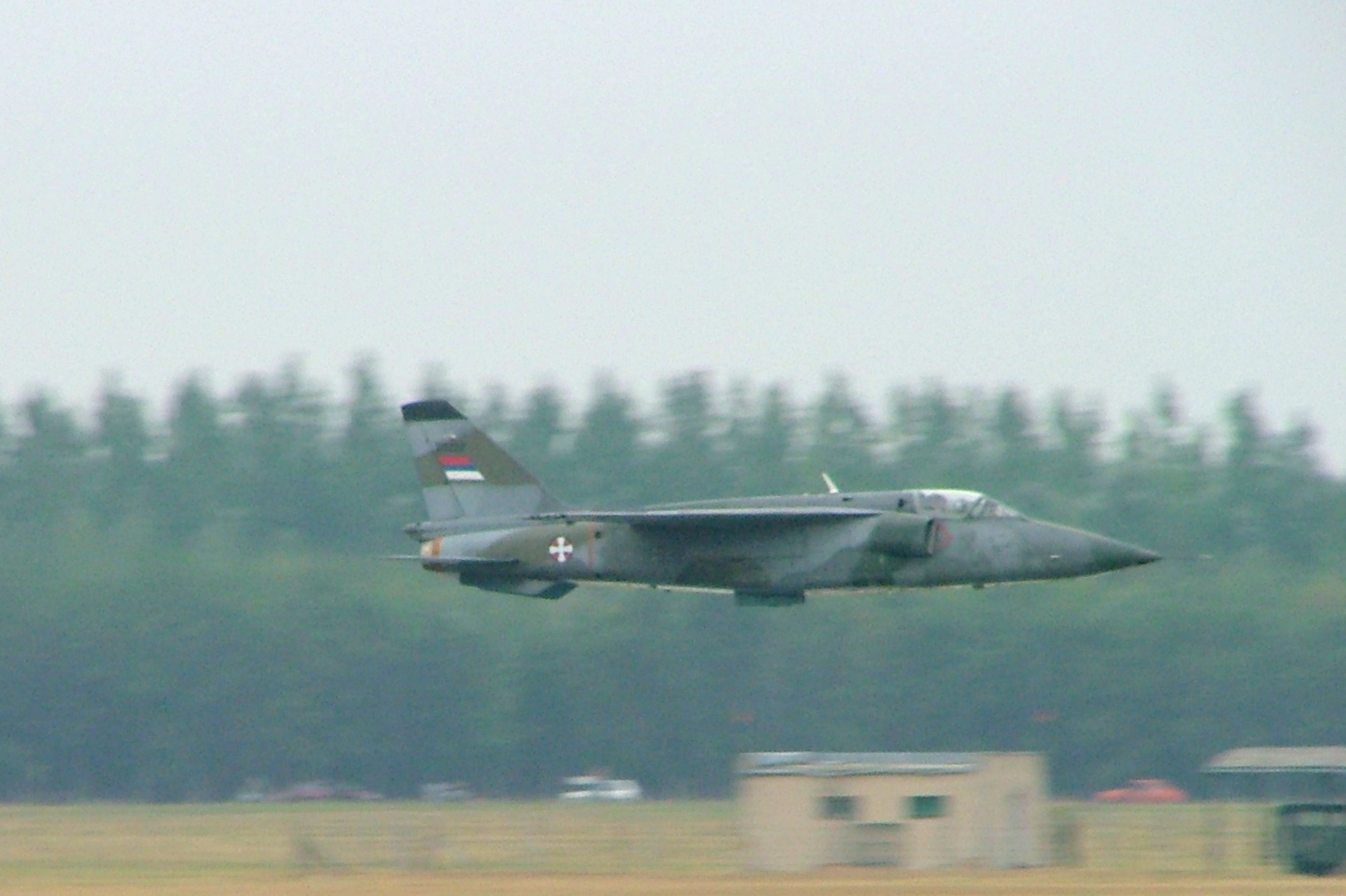
Soko J-22 Orao in low level flight, 2007

Low flying military training involves military aircraft flying at low altitude to prepare their aircrew, and other military personnel (e.g. air defence troops), for nap-of-the-earth flying in wartime. The aircraft types can include advanced trainers, ground-attack aircraft, transports and helicopters.

Some countries have sufficiently large military reservations for such training to take place without affecting the civilian population. In smaller countries, such as in Europe, there can be tension between the military and the local population—mainly because of aircraft noise.

== Hazards ==
Low-level flying involves air safety hazards such as:

- Collision with the ground, electricity wires etc. as a result of pilot error (e.g. Cavalese, 1998) or failure of aircraft systems - at low level and high speed there is little time to react to any problem.
- Mid-air collision with light aircraft (e.g. Norfolk, 1974) or other military aircraft.
- Bird strike.

The noise can also disturb animals and hence cause a hazard to horse-riders etc. (Note: On 10 June 2003 a RAF Chinook HC2 pilot flew low over horseriders in rural Lincolnshire. This caused one horse to behave uncontrollably and resulted in the death of the rider. At a subsequent inquest, the death was blamed upon the actions of the pilot while operating under inappropriate low flying rules from the UK Ministry Of Defence. The UK MOD undertook a review of their policies and raised the minimum flight height as a result.)

== By country ==
=== Canada ===
NATO tactical ultra-low-level flight training in Canada is located at CFB Goose Bay in Labrador. In response to lessons learned from the Vietnam War and the growing sophistication of Soviet anti-aircraft radar and surface-to-air missile technology being deployed in Europe, NATO allies began looking at new doctrines in the 1970s–1980s which mandated low-level flight to evade detection. CFB Goose Bay's location in Labrador, with a population of around 30,000 and area of 294,000 km^{2} (114,000 sq mi), made it an ideal location for low-level flight training. Labrador's sparse settlement and a local topography similar to parts of the Soviet Union, in addition to proximity to European NATO nations caused CFB Goose Bay to grow and become the primary low-level tactical training area for several NATO air forces during the 1980s.

During the 1980s–1990s, CFB Goose Bay hosted permanent detachments from the Royal Air Force, Luftwaffe, Royal Netherlands Air Force, and Aeronautica Militare, in addition to temporary deployments from several other NATO countries. Goose Bay Weapons Range is the only tactical bombing range in eastern Canada. The thirteen million hectare (130,000 square km) range includes ultra-low-level flying training to 30.5 m (100 feet) above ground level, supersonic flight areas, and an inert conventional and precision guided munitions bombing range.

=== United Kingdom ===
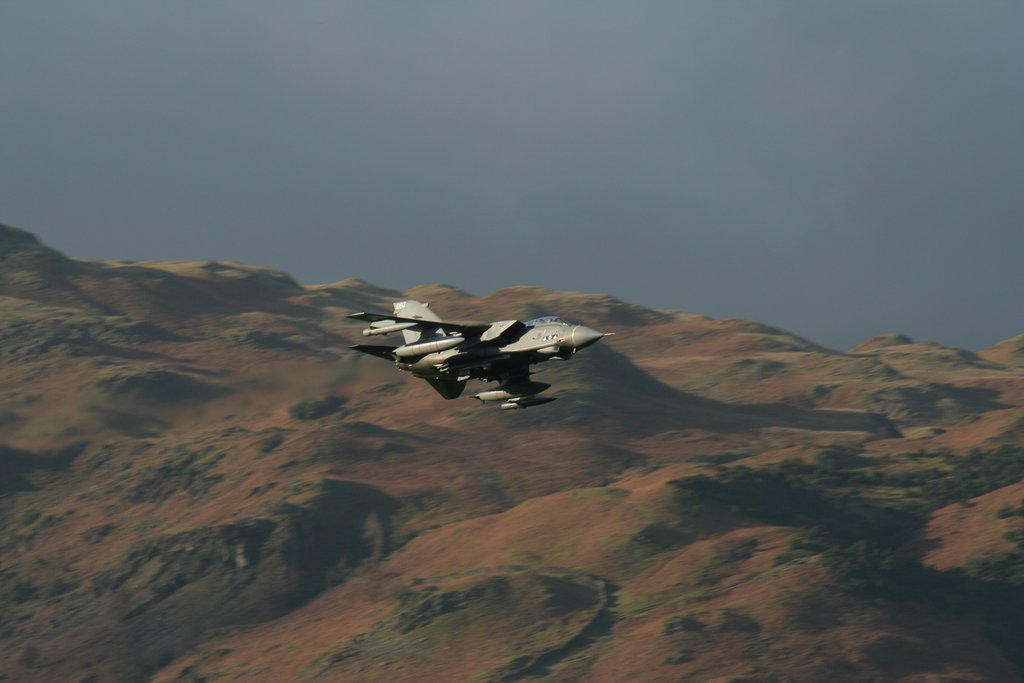
Low flying Tornado near Grasmere, UK

In the UK, low flying means fixed-wing aircraft at less than 2000 feet from the ground or light propeller driven aircraft and helicopters below 500 feet from the ground.

Low flying is permitted across the majority of the UK except for large urban areas, civil airports and some industrial and medical sites. Fixed-wing aircraft can fly down to 250 ft above ground level at a speed of up to 450 kt. Lower height limits apply for helicopters and in certain parts of mid Wales, Northern England and Northern Scotland, designated Tactical Training Areas. See, for example, the Mach Loop in Wales.

For safety and to minimise disturbance to the public, military aircrew training at low level is constrained by rules. A specialist military police unit conducts covert monitoring using Skyguard FC radar and investigates alleged infringements.

== See also ==
- Buzz number
- Controlled flight into terrain
- Ground Proximity Warning System (GPWS)
- Lists of accidents and incidents involving military aircraft
- Index of aviation articles
- Lists of aviation topics
- List of aviation, avionics, aerospace and aeronautical abbreviations
- List of aviation mnemonics
- List of aircraft weapons
- Military operations area
- Military training route
