= Llyn y Tri Greyenyn =

Lake in Wales

- Llyn Bach
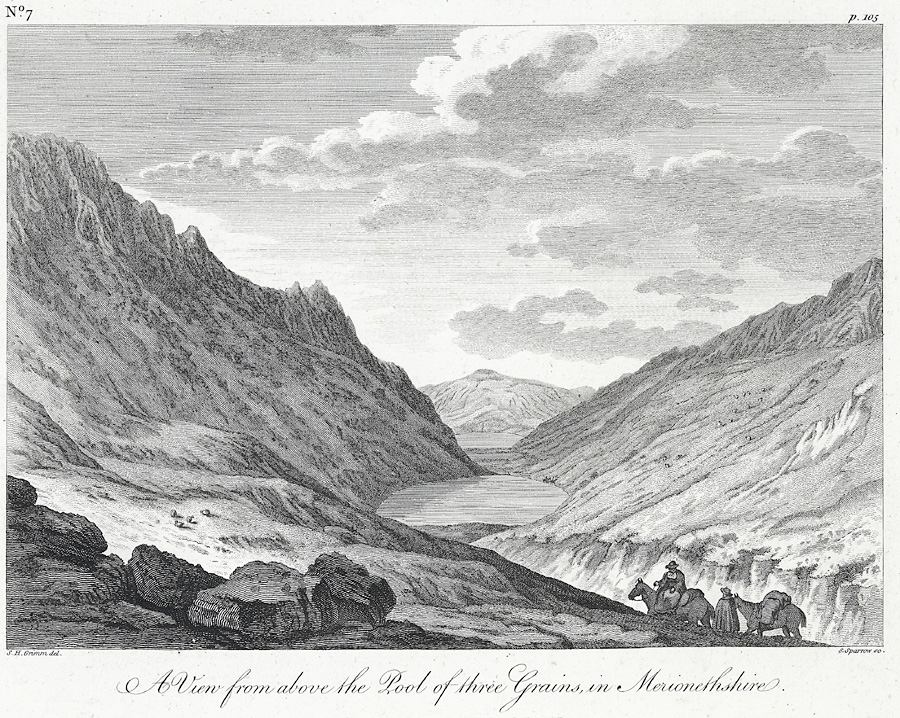
- ‘A View from above the Pool of three Grains, in Merionethshire’, by Samuel Hieronymus Grimm

- Location within Gwynedd
- Location: North Wales
- Coordinates: 52.70522°N 3.84704°W
- Basin countries: United Kingdom

Llyn y Tri Greyenyn was a small lake not far from Cadair Idris in the old parish of Tal-y-llyn, Merionethshire (now Gwynedd) in north Wales. It was located at the head of the valley of Cwm Rhwyddfor (or Cwm Rhwyddor) on the pass called Bwlch Llyn Bach between Minffordd and Cross Foxes; Llyn y Tri Greyenyn is the 'llyn bach’’ (‘little lake’) in the pass’s name. Most of the lake has now been infilled in order to improve the road (which formerly skirted the lake). The name means 'the lake of the three grains or pebbles'.

Today, the A487 passes through the site. There is also a small car park on the location of part of the lake (on the northwest side of the road). Some of the remains of the old lake can be seen on the south-east side. As the car park is a convenient place to watch military aircraft on the so-called 'Mach Loop’, the car park is sometimes called the ‘Mach Loop' car park.

== Names and traditions ==
One of the earliest references to the lake dates from around 1700 when Edward Lhuyd sent a questionnaire to every parish in Wales to inquire about geographical features, place names, local traditions and the like (his ‘Parochialia’). The reply from Tal-y-llyn includes the following:

Lhyn pen Morva al^{s} [alias] Lhyn y tri Grayenyn ym mlaen K. Rhwydhor ar dervun pl. Dol Gelhey.

(‘Llyn Pen Morfa alias Llyn y Tri Greyenyn at the head of Cwm Rhwyddfor on the border of the parish of Dolgellau.’)

The name of the lake is associated with a legend of Idris Gawr. Idris was said to have noticed three little stones or pebbles in his shoe. He removed his shoe and threw them away. But as Idris was a giant of enormous proportions, the three little stones were themselves the size of huge boulders. The three stones landed near the lake thus explaining the name. At least one of these stones is visible today on the side of the A487.

A version of the tale is recorded by Thomas Pennant in the second volume of his work A Tour of Wales (1781):

On the left, is the rugged height of Cader Idris, pass near a small lake called, Llyn y tri Graienyn, or of the three grains; which are three vast rocks, the ruins of the neighbouring mountain, which sometime or other had fallen into the water. These, say the peasants, were the three grains which had fallen into the shoe of the great Idris, which he threw out here, as soon as he felt them hurting his foot.

A tradition about how the lake was filled is mentioned by Lewis Morris in a poem that describes his journey from Ceredigion in 1750 to visit William Vaughan of Nannau. He says that the lake – if the tale is true– was filled by the urine of a giantess or witch:

Galw ym Minffordd yn frau
i olchi trwm feddyliau
yfodd y tafarnwr y gorau
rhoes y gwaetha i ninnau
oddiyno dan graig ddibyn
trwy fwlch y tri graienyn
a rhyfedd Iawn (os gwir hyn)
lle pisodd gwiddon lonaid llyn

(‘We called readily at Minffordd / to wash our heavy thoughts. / The innkeeper drank the best / and gave us the worst. / From there under the steep crag / through Bwlch y Tri Greyenyn / and, very strange (if it’s true), / where a giantess pissed a lakeful.’)

On the edge of the 1842 Dolgellau tithe map the name of the lake is noted as ‘Llyn Tri Graienyn'. But later Ordnance Survey maps call it 'Llyn Bach'.
