= Elton Beds =

- Stratigraphic range: Silurian
- Type: Formation

Location
- Region: England, Wales

The Elton Beds is a geologic formation in England and Wales. It preserves fossils dating back to the Silurian period.

== See also ==
- List of fossiliferous stratigraphic units in England
- List of fossiliferous stratigraphic units in Wales
