= Woolhope Limestone =

Geologic formation in Wales

- Stratigraphic range: Silurian
- Type: Formation

Lithology
- Primary: Limestone

Location
- Region: Wales
- Country: United Kingdom

The Woolhope Limestone is a geologic formation in Wales. It preserves fossils dating back to the Silurian period.

== See also ==
- List of fossiliferous stratigraphic units in Wales
