= Llanarmon Limestone =

- Stratigraphic range: Carboniferous
- Type: Formation

Location
- Region: Wales
- Country: United Kingdom

The Llanarmon Limestone is a geologic formation in Wales. It preserves fossils dating back to the Carboniferous period.

== See also ==
- List of fossiliferous stratigraphic units in Wales
