= Cregennen Formation =

Geologic formation in Wales

- Stratigraphic range: Darriwilian
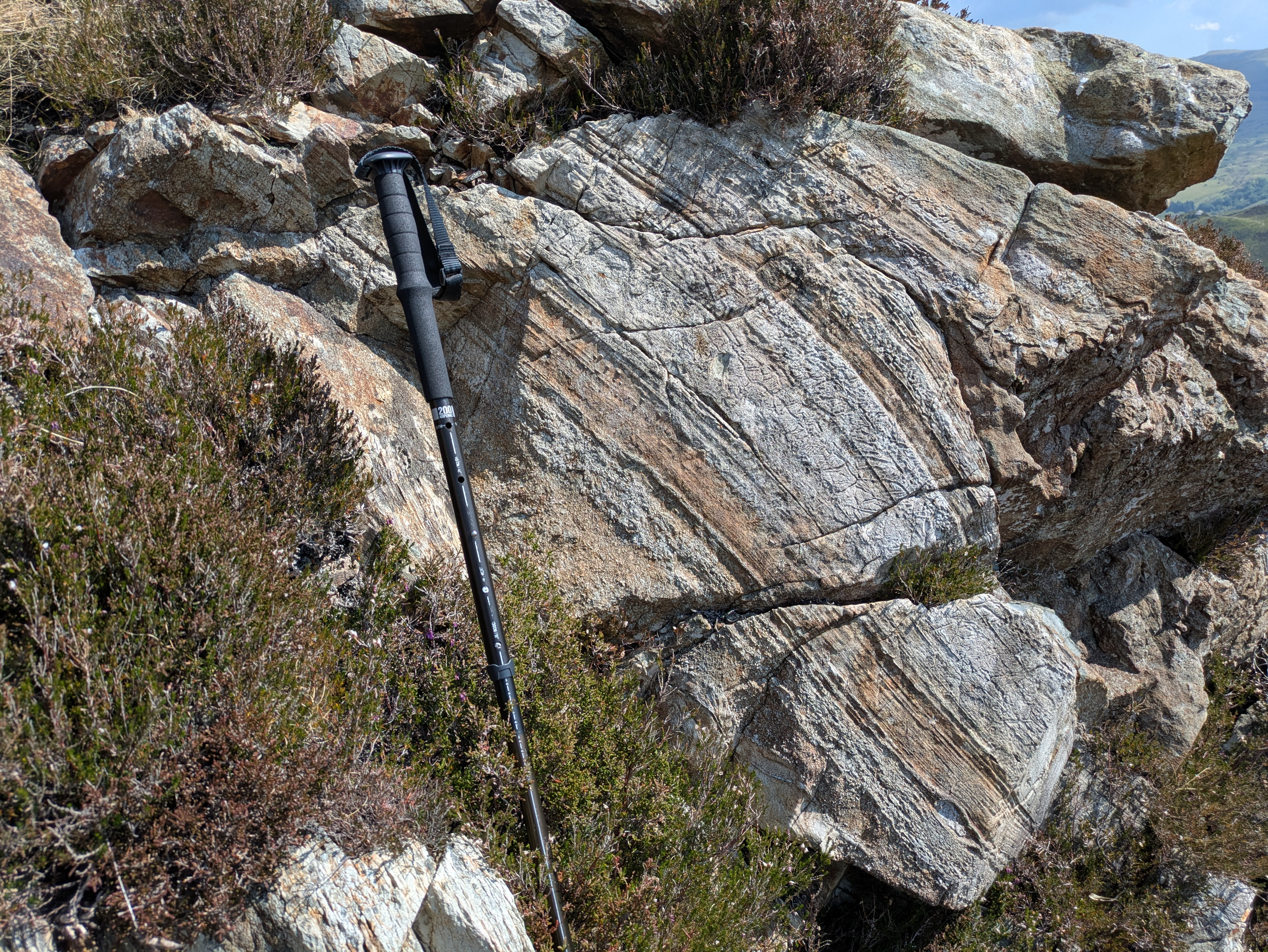
- Acidic tuffs of the Cefn Hir Member near the summit of Pared-y-Cefn Hir, Gwynedd, Wales
- Type: Geological formation
- Unit of: Aran Volcanic Group
- Sub-units: Cefn Hir Member, Bryn Brith Member
- Underlies: Brithion Formation, Llyn y Gafr Volcanic Formation
- Overlies: Offrwm Volcanic Formation
- Thickness: up to 350 metres (1,150 ft)

Location
- Country: Wales

Type section
- Named for: Llynnau Cregennen

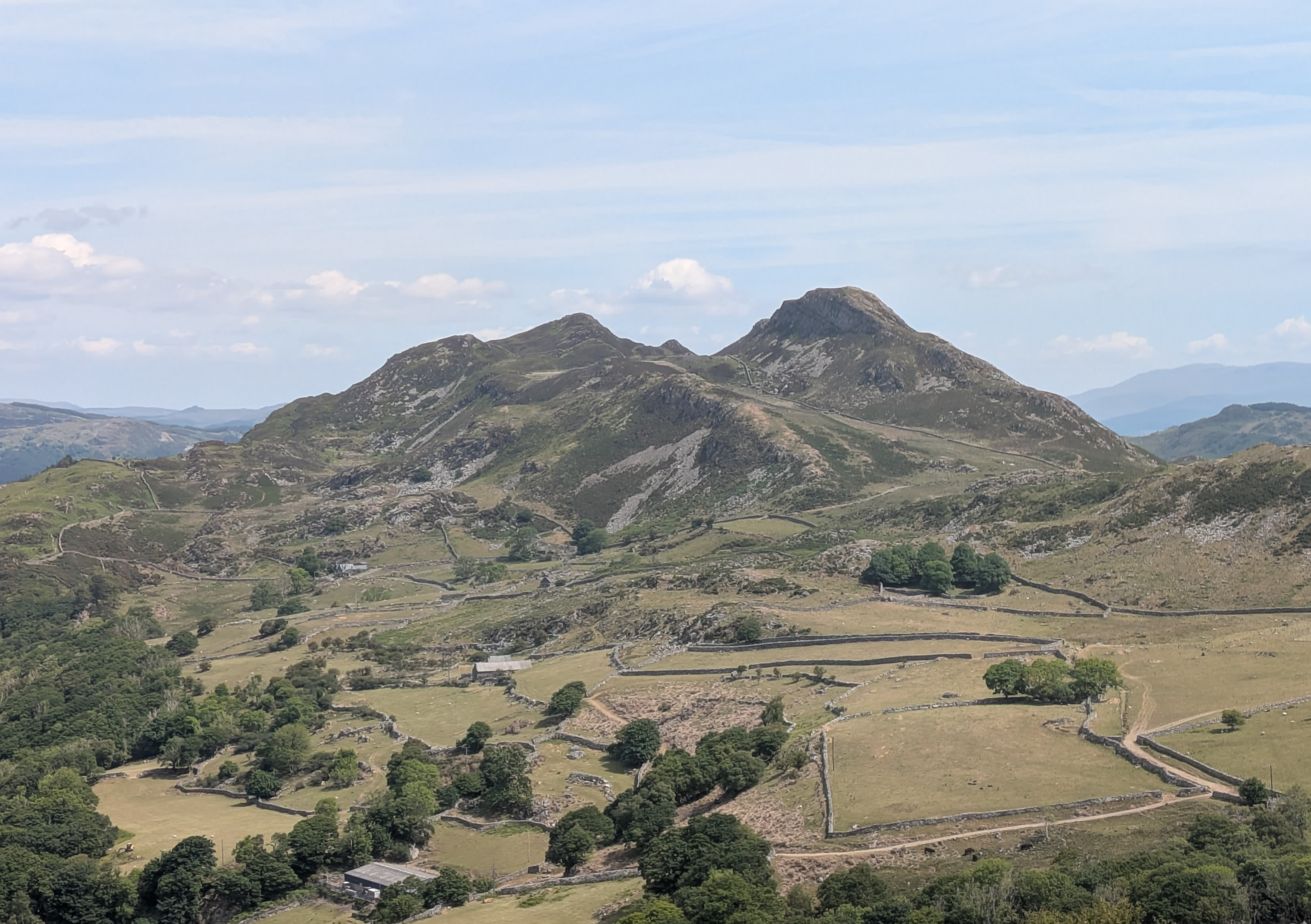
Prominent ridges of Pared y Cefn-Hir (to the right) and Bryn Brith (to the left) viewed from the southwest, formed of volcanic members of the Cregennen Formation

The Cregennen Formation is a geological formation of early Darriwilian age (late Middle Ordovician). It consists of dark grey to black mudstones containing graptolites, with interbedded volcanic units, particularly felsic and mafic tuffs.

Two larger volcanic units developed are the Cefn Hir and Bryn Brith members that form the prominent ridges of Pared-y-Cefn-Hir and Bryn Brith.
