= Nant Ffrancon Formation =

Geologic formation in Wales

- Stratigraphic range: Ordovician
- Type: Formation

Location
- Coordinates: 53.2292°N 4.0839°W
- Region: Wales
- Country: United Kingdom

The Nant Ffrancon Fermation is a geologic formation in Wales. It preserves fossils dating back to the Ordovician period.

== See also ==
- List of fossiliferous stratigraphic units in Wales
