= Gronant Formation =

Geological formation in Wales

- Stratigraphic range: Carboniferous
- Type: Formation

Location
- Region: Wales
- Country: United Kingdom

The Gronant Formation is a geologic formation in Wales. It preserves fossils dating back to the Carboniferous period.

== Description ==
The Gronant Formation crops out along the north-east coast of Wales, most conspicuously on the Great Orme peninsula and the limestone escarpments south-east of Prestatyn. It represents the uppermost Dinantian carbonate package on the North Wales shelf. About 70 m thick, it lies conformably upon the Asbian Great Orme Limestone (part of the Dyserth Limestone Group) and is overlain by the basinal cherts of the Pentre Chert Formation, a boundary that signals the shift from shelf carbonates to deeper-water Namurian sedimentation. Warren and colleagues divided the unit into two mappable members: the Bishop's Quarry Limestone (c. 20 m of dark, well-bedded packstones and wackestones with thin mudstone partings) and the Summit Limestone (c. 50 m of paler, locally cherty grainstones). These beds accumulated during an early Brigantian rise in relative sea-level in which quiet, lagoonal muds gave way to better-oxygenated shoal facies on the shelf margin, producing fining-upwards cycles capped by incipient palaeokarst surfaces.

Petrographically the limestones show widespread neomorphism of aragonitic bioclasts, yet primary features—planar cross-bedding, graded turbidite sheets and fenestral fabrics—remain visible. The formation yields a rich Brigantian macrofauna dominated by large productid brachiopods (e.g. Gigantoproductus, Linoprotonia), rough-shelled corals such as Caninia pachyendothecum and Diphyphyllum lateseptatum, and the goniatite-associated bivalve Posidonia becheri at its base, tying the lower boundary to the Plc Zone. These faunal markers make the Gronant beds a valuable datum for correlating late Viséan shelf carbonates with mixed clastic–carbonate successions in the adjoining Craven Basin. In current British Geological Survey nomenclature the unit is treated as the uppermost part of the Clwyd Limestone Group; the earlier usage "Gronant Group" is now considered obsolete, but the historical formation name is retained for continuity with the literature.

== See also ==
- List of fossiliferous stratigraphic units in Wales
