= Redhill Mudstone =

Geologic formation in Wales

- Stratigraphic range: Ordovician
- Type: Formation

Lithology
- Primary: Mudstone

Location
- Region: Wales
- Country: United Kingdom

The Redhill Mudstone, often referred to as the Slade and Redhill Mudstone Formation, is a geologic formation in Wales. It preserves fossils dating back to the Ordovician period (around 450 to 446 million years ago). It’s mostly composed of thin sandstones and mudstones of a blue-gray color. This formation is most notable for its preservation of near-perfect marine fossils.

== See also ==
- List of fossiliferous stratigraphic units in Wales
