= Ffestiniog Flags =

Geologic formation in Wales

- Stratigraphic range: Cambrian
- Type: Formation

Location
- Region: Wales
- Country: United Kingdom

The Ffestiniog Flags is a geologic formation in Wales. It preserves fossils dating back to the Cambrian period.

== See also ==
- List of fossiliferous stratigraphic units in Wales
