= Harlech Dome =

Geological dome in Wales

Coordinates: 52.86°N 3.91°W

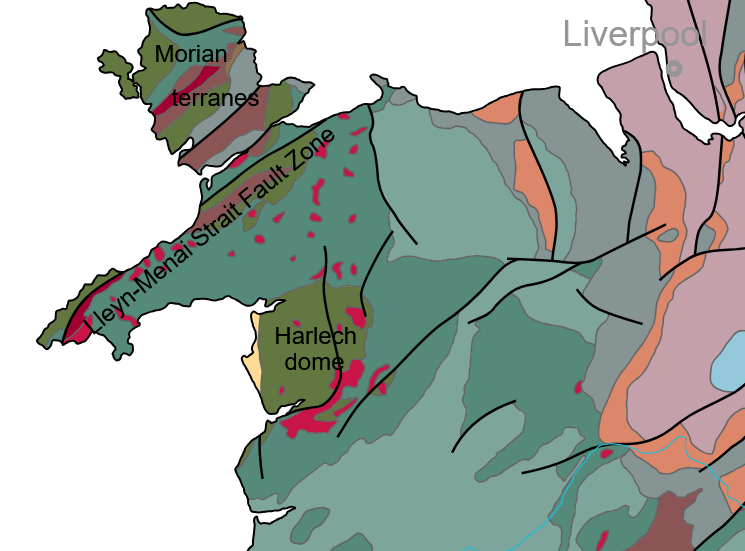
Location of the Harlech dome, North Wales

The Harlech Dome is a geological dome in southern Snowdonia in north Wales. It extends approximately from Blaenau Ffestiniog in the north to Tywyn in the south, and includes Harlech, The Rhinogydd, Barmouth and Cadair Idris.

The geological layer structure comprises Cambrian sedimentary, volcanic and intrusive rocks from the lower Paleozoic age approximately 4.5 km thick. The geology contains the Harlech Grits Group, Mawddach Group, Rhobell Volcanic Group and Aran Volcanic Group.

The area contains a wide range of metallic minerals and has been mined for (copper, silver, zinc, manganese, gold) in the past.
