= Carmarthen Formation =

Geologic formation in Wales and England

- Stratigraphic range: Ordovician
- Type: Formation

Location
- Country: Wales, England

The Carmarthen Formation is a geologic formation in Wales and England. It preserves fossils dating back to the Ordovician period.

== See also ==
- List of fossiliferous stratigraphic units in Wales
- List of fossiliferous stratigraphic units in England
