= 1974 Norfolk mid-air collision =

Aviation incident in Norfolk, England

Accident
- Date: 9 August 1974
- Summary: Mid-air collision
- Site: Fordham Fen, Norfolk, England; 52°34′00″N 00°24′00″E
- Total fatalities: 3
- Total survivors: 0

First aircraft
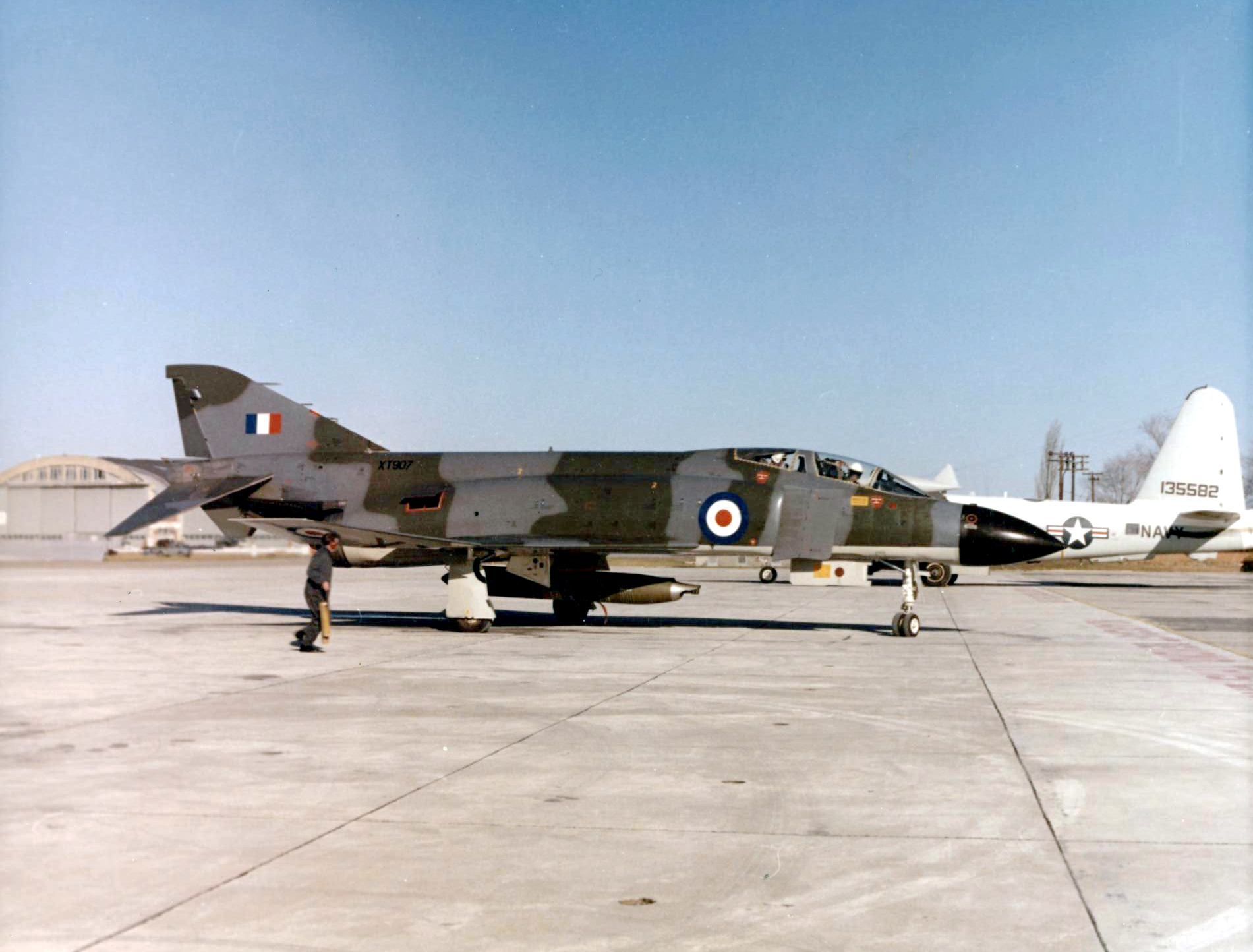
- An RAF Phantom FGR.2 similar to the accident aircraft
- Type: McDonnell-Douglas F-4M Phantom FGR.2
- Operator: Royal Air Force
- Registration: XV493
- Flight origin: RAF Coningsby
- Crew: 2
- Fatalities: 2

Second aircraft
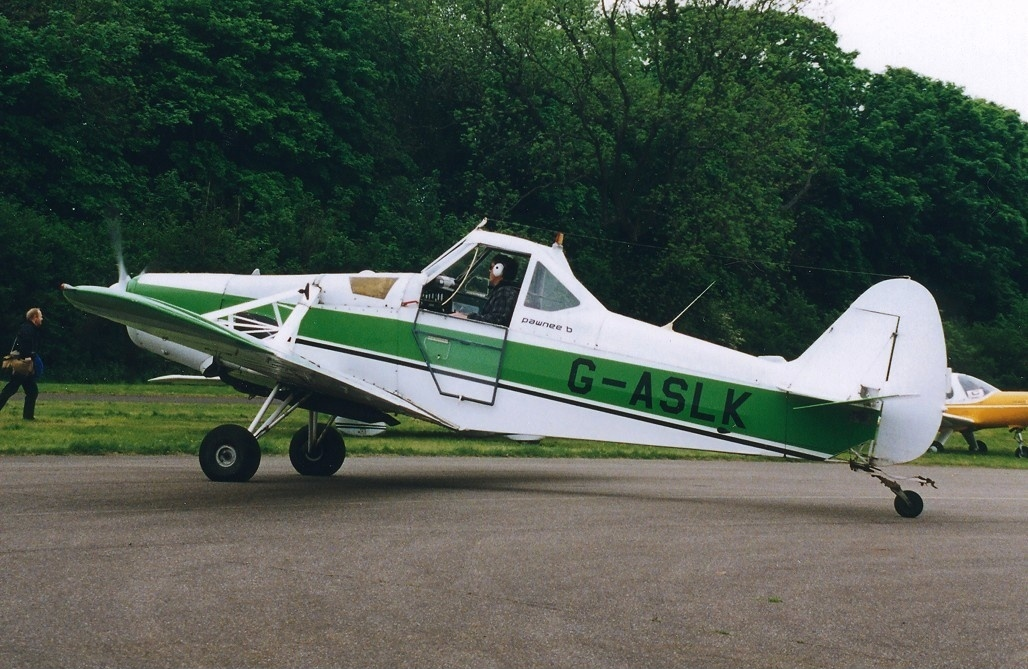
- A Piper Pawnee similar to the accident aircraft
- Type: Piper PA-25-235 Pawnee
- Operator: ADS (Aerial) Limited
- Registration: G-ASVX
- Flight origin: Broomfield
- Crew: 1
- Fatalities: 1

The 1974 Norfolk mid-air collision happened on 9 August 1974 at Fordham Fen, Norfolk, England when a Royal Air Force McDonnell-Douglas F-4M Phantom FGR.2 of No. 41 Squadron RAF (41 Sqn) collided with a Piper PA-25-235 Pawnee crop spraying aircraft. All three aviators were killed: the pilot and navigator of the Phantom and the pilot of the Pawnee. The Phantom pilot was a Royal Air Force Group Captain and station commander of RAF Coningsby. It was the first collision between a civil aircraft and a military fast jet in the United Kingdom low flying military training system.

== Aircraft ==
The Pawnee registered G-ASVX was a single-engined single-seat crop spraying aircraft built in 1974. The Phantom serial number XV493 was a twin-engined two-seat, all-weather military strike/interceptor aircraft.

== Background ==
The RAF pilot, David Robert Kidgell Blucke, was born on 28 November 1931, and attended Malvern College. He joined the RAF in 1950, and had been on exchanges in Canada, flying the F-101. Around 1966 he had commanded 11 Sqn flying English Electric Lightnings from RAF Leuchars. He was promoted to Group Captain in January 1972 and moved to Coningsby in August 1972.

The RAF navigator, Terence Wesley Kirkland, had attended Foyle College.

== Accident ==
The Pawnee had departed earlier on 9 August 1974 from Southend Airport to a disused airfield, formerly RAF Downham Market, situated near Broomhill and Bexwell, in Norfolk. This location was used as a temporary base to refuel the aircraft and to load pesticide. At about 14:04 the aircraft had finished spraying a field 6.5 miles (10.5 km) south of Downham Market and was returning to replenish the pesticide hopper. The sprayer was of ADS Aerials of Southend, with pilot Paul Hickmott, aged 24. He had taken off from the airfield near Bexwell, taking off at 14:30, due to land at 15:10.

The Phantom departed RAF Coningsby at 13:51 to fly a low-level navigation and reconnaissance flight at no lower than 250 feet (76 m) above ground level. The Phantom was following a standard low-flying route; the Pawnee pilot was aware that military low-flying routes were in the area, but the exact routing was classified and not released by the military. About 14:08 about 1 km (1,100 yd) west of the village of Hilgay, and at an estimated height of around 300 ft (91 m) the Phantom, flying at a speed of about 420 kn (780 km/h), struck the Pawnee on its right side. The Pawnee disintegrated, while the Phantom, on fire and shedding parts of its structure, continued on its heading for a further 1 kilometre (1,100 yd) before it hit the ground inverted. All three aviators were killed: the pilot and navigator of the Phantom and the pilot of the Pawnee. All flying was stopped at Coningsby for the day.

== Investigation ==
Both aircraft were found to have been maintained correctly and were legally authorized for the flights. Farmwork Services, who had chartered the Pawnee, had informed the local police authority about their proposed operation and the type of chemical to be used. Nothing in the regulations required them to inform the military, although Farmwork Services had, as usual, informed nearby RAF Marham (an operational airfield about 8 nmi (15 km) from the accident) that they would be spraying an extensive area of Norfolk between June and August 1974.

Investigation of the wreckage failed to determine if either had a working anti-collision light, and it was only possible to determine the height of the accident from eyewitness accounts. The collision occurred in good visibility at an estimated height above ground level of 300 ft (91 m). The investigation could find no evidence to suggest that either of the pilots had a medical problem or that either aircraft had any defect that would have contributed to the accident.

The rules of the air state that the Pawnee should have given way to the Phantom which was closing from the right. But it was accepted that at a closing speed of about 400 kn (740 km/h) the time needed by the Pawnee pilot to assess the situation and execute a manoeuvre was minimal. It was also a requirement of the Phantom pilot to make sure that he did not collide with the Pawnee, but clearly in this accident the lack of time was an element. Also the military aircraft had only just turned onto the heading, and with the Pawnee 15° to his left the view may well have been obstructed by the Phantom's canopy frame.

While it accepted the need for the Royal Air Force to practise low level high-speed flying, the investigation report was concerned about the lack of information on the military low-flying route available to civil pilots, particularly those involved with crop spraying, pipeline, and powerline inspection.

== Cause ==
The investigation determined "The accident occurred because neither pilot saw the other aircraft in time to avoid collision. The 'see and be seen' principle was inadequate for preventing collision in the circumstances that existed. A significant feature which contributed to the accident was the absence of any system for co-ordinating military and civil low flying activities in the low flying areas and link routes."

== Recommendations ==
The accident report made seven recommendations:

1. That the location and vertical extent of the low flying areas and link routes should be made available.
2. Private pilots should be alerted to the nature of military low flying activities and the need to avoid them.
3. An advisory service be provided to enable civil pilots to co-ordinate their activities with the military.
4. That civil aircraft involved in low flying activities should be painted as conspicuously as possible and fitted with high-power collision warning lights preferably strobe type. Also recommended that the military consider fitment of strobe type high-power collision warning lights to aircraft engaged in low level training.
5. The military review their need for airspace for low-level high-speed operations and withdraw any areas not needed.
6. That the upper limit of the military low flying link routes be limited to 1,000 ft (300 m) instead of 2,000 ft (610 m), if not possible then 1,500 ft (460 m) should be considered.
7. That the rules of the air be amended to allow aircraft with the right of way to climb and if necessary pass over the other aircraft.
