= List of fossiliferous stratigraphic units in Wales =

This is a list of fossiliferous stratigraphic units in Wales.

| Group or Formation | Period | Notes |
|---|---|---|
| Aber Mawr Shale | Ordovician | |
| Afon Ffinnant Formation | Ordovician | |
| Allt Ddu Formation | Ordovician | |
| Aran Volcanic Group/Llyn y Gafr Formation | Ordovician | |
| Bala Group/Rhiwlas Formation | Ordovician | |
| Black Rock Limestone | Carboniferous | |
| Blaencediw Formation | Ordovician | |
| Bod Deiniol Formation | Ordovician | |
| Bodeidda Mudstone | Ordovician | |
| Bronydd Formation | Silurian | |
| Bryn Siltstone Formation | Ordovician | |
| Builth Volcanic | Ordovician | |
| Camnant Mudstone | Ordovician | |
| Carmarthen Formation | Ordovician | |
| Carmarthen Group/Afon Ffinnant Formation | Ordovician | |
| Carnedd Iago Formation | Ordovician | |
| Crychan Formation | Silurian | |
| Cwm Felin Boeth Formation | Ordovician | |
| Cymerig Limestone | Ordovician | |
| Cyrn Formation | Ordovician | |
| Dolhir Formation | Ordovician | |
| Dyserth Quarry Limestone | Carboniferous | |
| Elton Beds | Silurian | |
| Ffestiniog Flag Formation | Cambrian | |
| Ffestiniog Flags | Cambrian | |
| Foel Formation | Carboniferous | |
| GelliFormation | Ordovician | |
| Glyn Formation | Ordovician | |
| Glyn Gower Formation | Ordovician | |
| GraigFormation | Ordovician | |
| Gronant Formation | Carboniferous | |
| Haverford Formation | Ordovician | |
| Haverford Mudstone | Silurian | |
| Hells Mouth Grits | Cambrian | |
| High Tor Limestone | Carboniferous | |
| Hirnant Limestone | Ordovician | |
| Hope Shale | Ordovician | |
| Hughley Shale | Silurian | |
| Hunts Bay Oolite Formation | Carboniferous | |
| Leete Limestone | Carboniferous | |
| Llanarmon Limestone | Carboniferous | |
| Llandudno Pier Dolomite Formation | Carboniferous | |
| Llanelly Formation | Carboniferous | |
| Llanfallteg Formation | Ordovician | |
| Llanfawr Mudstone | Ordovician | |
| Llwyn Formation | Carboniferous | |
| Lower Flaxley Beds | Silurian | |
| Lower Longhope Beds | Silurian | |
| Lower Old Red Sandstone Group/Downtonian Formation | Silurian | |
| Ludlow Series Group/Whitcliffe Formation | Silurian | |
| Mawddach Group/DolFormation | Ordovician | |
| May Hill Sandstone Formation | Silurian | |
| Mercia Mudstone | Triassic | |
| Middle Elton Formation | Silurian | |
| Milford Haven Formation | Silurian | |
| Moel Hiraddug Limestone | Carboniferous | |
| Nant Ffrancon Formation | Ordovician | |
| Nant Hir Formation | Ordovician | |
| Nant Hir Group/Derfel Limestone | Ordovician | |
| Ogof Hen Formation | Ordovician | |
| Onny Shale | Ordovician | |
| PenFormation | Silurian | |
| Plas Uchaf Formation | Ordovician | |
| Pont y Fenni Formation | Ordovician | |
| Pontyfenni Formation | Ordovician | |
| Quartz Conglomerate | Devonian | |
| Redhill Mudstone | Ordovician | |
| Rhiwlas Limestone Formation | Ordovician | |
| Senni bed Formation | Devonian | |
| Senni Beds | Devonian | |
| Sholeshook Limestone | Ordovician | |
| Slade Mudstone | Ordovician | |
| Spring Quarry Limestone | Carboniferous | |
| St. Maughan's Formation | Devonian | |
| Sully Beds | Triassic | |
| Sutton Formation | Jurassic | |
| Sutton stone Formation | Jurassic | |
| Trefawr Formation | Silurian | |
| Treiorwerth Formation | Ordovician | |
| Ty Formation | Silurian | |
| Upper Blaisdon Beds | Silurian | |
| Upper Flaxley Beds | Silurian | |
| Upper Longhope Beds | Silurian | |
| Wenallt Formation | Ordovician | |
| Wenlock Shale | Silurian | |
| Wilsonia Shales Formation | Silurian | |
| Woolhope Limestone | Silurian | |

== See also ==
- Lists of fossiliferous stratigraphic units in Europe
- Lists of fossiliferous stratigraphic units in the United Kingdom
