= Bala Group =

Geologic formation in Wales

- Stratigraphic range: Ordovician
- Type: Group

Location
- Region: Wales
- Country: United Kingdom

The Bala Group is a geological group in Wales. It preserves fossils dated to the Ordovician period.

== See also ==
- List of fossiliferous stratigraphic units in Wales
