= Carmarthen Group =

Geologic group in Wales

- Stratigraphic range: Ordovician
- Type: Group

Location
- Region: Wales
- Country: United Kingdom

The Carmarthen Group is a geologic group in Wales. It preserves fossils dated to the Ordovician period.

== See also ==
- List of fossiliferous stratigraphic units in Wales
