= Harlech Grits Group =

Geological group in northwest Wales

- Stratigraphic range: early Cambrian
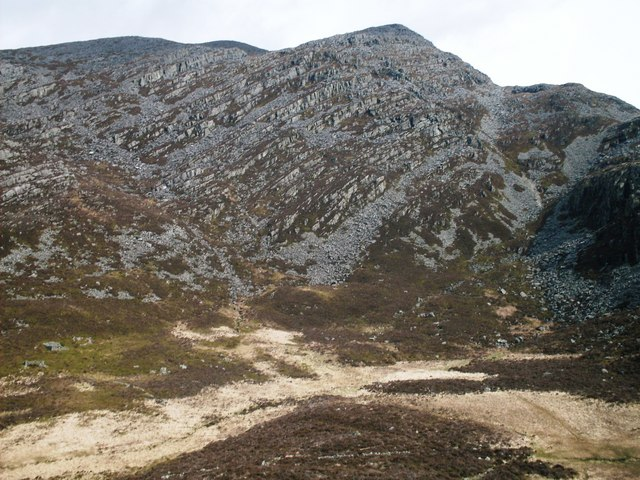
- Sandstones of the Rhinog Formation, Rhinog Fawr, Snowdonia
- Type: Group
- Sub-units: Gamlan Formation, Barmouth Formation, Hafotty Formation, Rhinog Formation, Llanbedr Formation, Dolwen Formation
- Underlies: Mawddach Group
- Overlies: Bryn-teg Volcanic Formation
- Thickness: about 2,000 m (6,600 ft)

Lithology
- Primary: sandstones
- Other: mudstones, siltstones, greywacke

Location
- Region: Northwest Wales
- Country: United Kingdom

Type section
- Named for: Harlech (town)

The Harlech Grits Group is a lower to middle Cambrian lithostratigraphic group (a sequence of rock strata) in northwest Wales. The name is derived from the town of Harlech in Gwynedd.

== Outcrops ==
The rocks are exposed beneath Harlech and across the Harlech Dome to its east; a broad anticlinal structure which encompasses the Rhinogydd range.

== Lithology and stratigraphy ==
The group comprises about 2000m thickness of sandstone, mudstones, siltstones and greywackes laid down in the marine Welsh Basin during the early to mid Cambrian period. The group comprises (in descending order i.e., oldest last) the Gamlan Formation, the Barmouth Formation, the Hafotty Formation, the Rhinog Formation, the Llanbedr Formation and the Dolwen Formation.
