= United Kingdom Low Flying System =

United Kingdom airspace

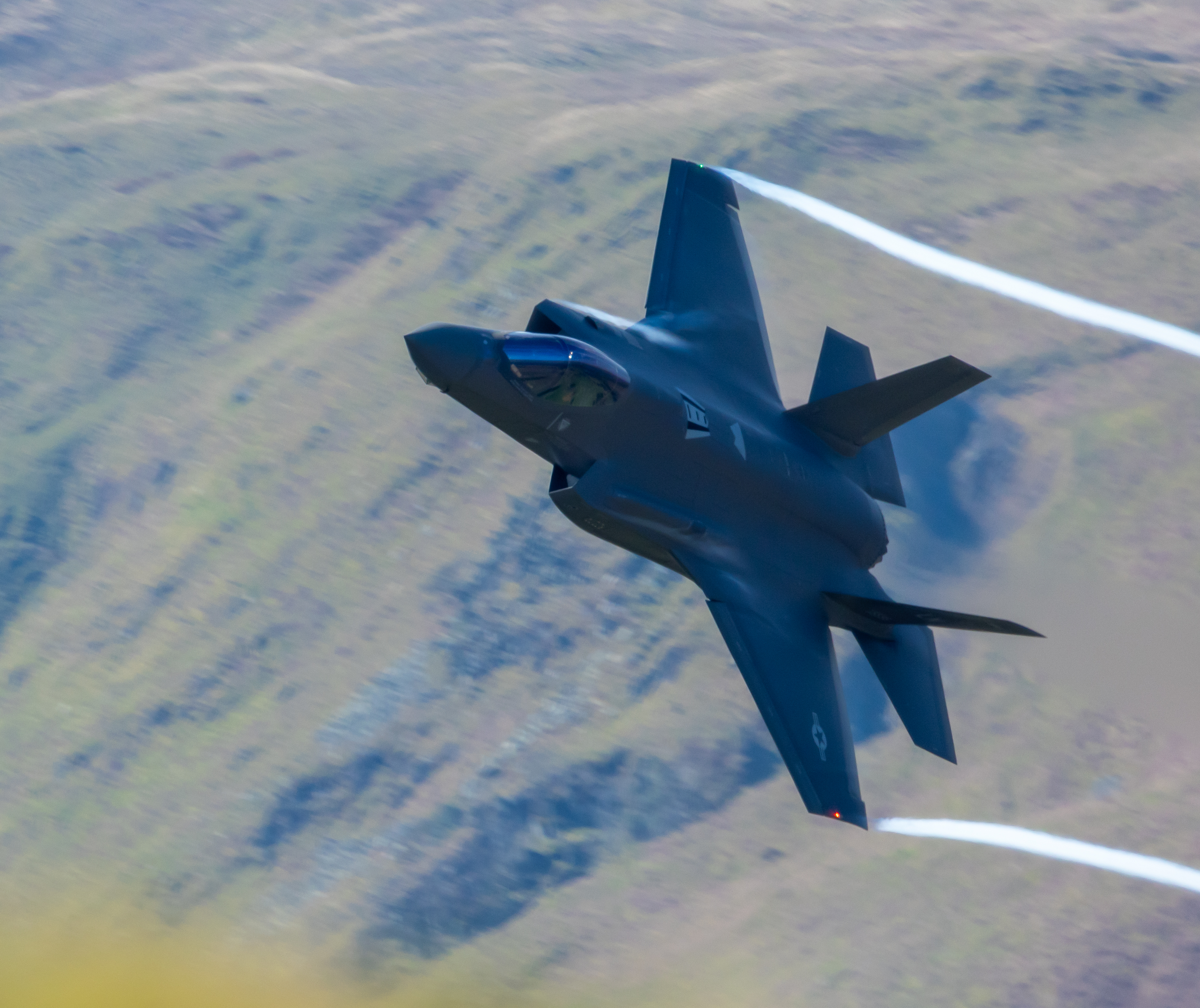
Low Flying Area Action

The United Kingdom Low Flying System (UKLFS) is the airspace across the United Kingdom in which low flying training is permitted. The system was established in 1979 and extends from ground level to 2000ft AGL. Flying is carried out from 0800 to 2300 during weekdays only. Military aircraft are also allowed to fly in Tactical Training Areas.

Aircraft are restricted to a cruising speed of 450 knots, and reheat (use of afterburner) is not permitted except for emergencies. Low flying aircraft should not enter any Air Traffic Zones, including Aerodrome Traffic Zones and Military Aerodrome Traffic Zone.

== History ==
It was introduced by the Air Force Board, and by Labour Under-Secretary of State for Air James Wellbeloved, who two years later defected to the SDP. In 1990 the Defence Select Committee had proposed that low-flying be removed over two years.

=== Complaints ===
In 1979 there were around 4,000 complaints about low flying, with £38,000 paid in compensation. In 1978 a USAF General Dynamics F-111 Aardvark had flown supersonic directly over a Welsh village, receiving many complaints. In 1981, a F-111 flew low over Finzean in Aberdeenshire; Captain Robert Vosburgh was disciplined.

=== Incidents ===
- On 27 March 1973, Hunter 'XG256', of 79 Squadron, hit the supports of Caradon Hill transmitting station and crashed. The pilot, 23 year old Flying Officer Richard Pearson, safely ejected.
- On the morning of Friday August 19 1977, a USAF F-4 Phantom flew through the supporting cables of Caldbeck transmitting station in Cumbria, and severed the aircraft's starboard wing, taking two feet off. Major John McKenney was at 600ft. The aircraft had taken off from RAF Bentwaters in Suffolk. The aircraft survived.

== Tactical Training Areas ==
- LFA7(T), central Wales
- LFA14(T), northern Scotland
- LFA20(T), Anglo-Scottish border and west Northumberland

== See also ==
- Purple Corridor
