= Ogwen Group =

Geological group in north-west Wales

- Stratigraphic range: Arenig to Caradoc Ordovician
- Type: Group
- Sub-units: Allt Llwyd and Wig Bach formations, Nant Ffrancon Subgroup (which includes Llanengan and St Tudwal's formations), Cwm Eigiau, Allt Fawr Rhyolitic Tuff, Dwyfach and Nod Glas formations
- Overlies: Mawddach Group, Rhobell Volcanic Group
- Thickness: variable, more than 2 km

Lithology
- Primary: mudstones, siltstones
- Other: sandstones, tuffs, oolitic ironstones

Location
- Region: northwest Wales
- Country: Wales

Type section
- Named for: Ogwen Valley

The Ogwen Group is an Ordovician lithostratigraphic group (a sequence of rock strata) in Gwynedd, north-west Wales. The name is derived from Ogwen Valley, a locality in Snowdonia where it outcrops.

== Outcrops ==
The rocks occur throughout Llŷn and eastwards into Snowdonia within Gwynedd.

== Lithology and stratigraphy ==
The Group consists of about 1000 m thickness (in the Pwllheli area) of mudstones and siltstones with some basal sandstones together with tuffs and oolitic ironstones laid down during the Arenig and Caradoc epochs of the Ordovician Period. The Nant Ffrancon subgroup alone exceeds 2km thickness in central Snowdonia. The subgroup as itself been classed as both a formation and a group at times.
