= Tal-y-llyn, Gwynedd =

Coordinates: 52.666°N 3.908°W

Tal-y-llyn
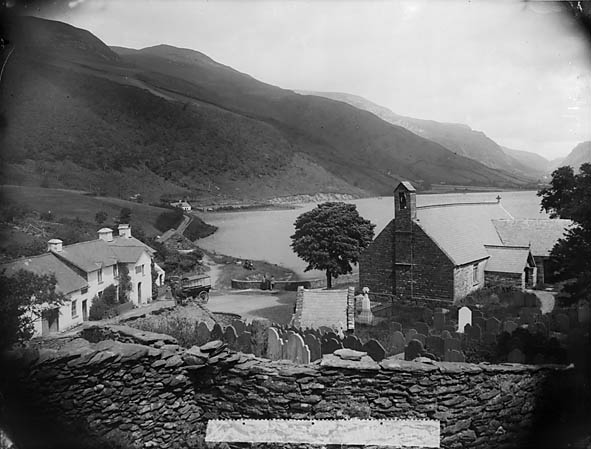
- St. Mary's church and the hamlet at the end of the lake, the view c. 1885

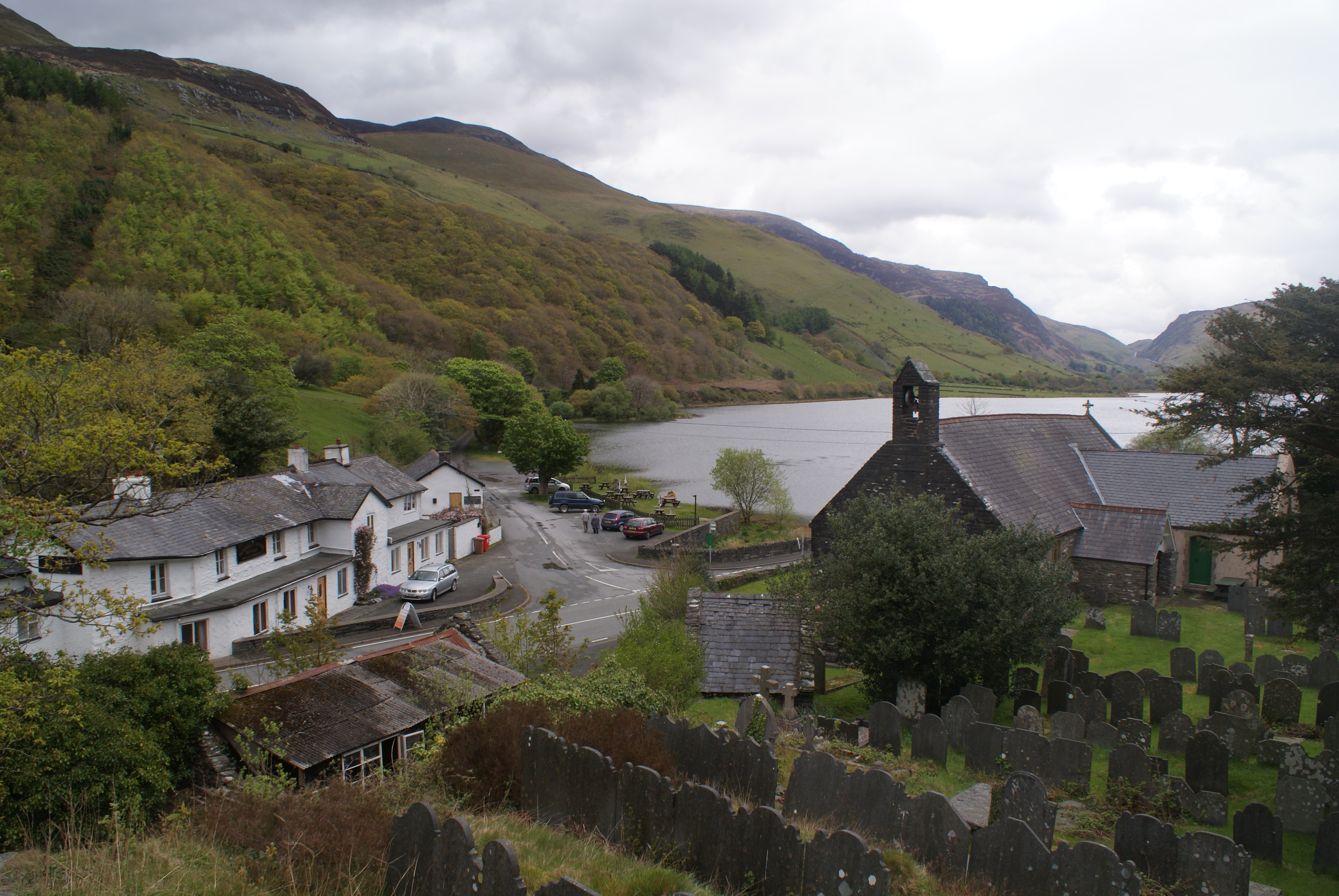
- The same view in 2012

- Location within Gwynedd
- OS grid reference: SH709094
- Community: Llanfihangel-y-Pennant
- Principal area: Gwynedd
- Country: Wales
- Sovereign state: United Kingdom
- Post town: TYWYN
- Postcode district: LL36
- Dialling code: 01654
- Police: North Wales
- Fire: North Wales
- Ambulance: Welsh
- UK Parliament: Dwyfor Meirionnydd
- Senedd Cymru – Welsh Parliament: Dwyfor Meirionnydd

Tal-y-llyn, or Talyllyn, is a small hamlet and former parish in the community of Llanfihangel-y-Pennant in Gwynedd, Wales, situated at the end of Tal-y-llyn Lake close to the village of Abergynolwyn. The parish covered an area of 36,000 acres (15,000 ha). The River Dysynni flows out of the lake at this point, flowing down to enter Cardigan Bay north of Tywyn. Another lake known as Llyn y Tri Greyenyn or Llyn Bach was formerly located close to the border with the parish of Dolgellau.

For much of the 19th century, and the first half of the 20th century, the predominant industry in the area was slate mining, in the quarries at Bryn Eglwys and Corris. The Talyllyn Railway was built in the 1860s to serve the quarries at Bryn Eglwys. Although this never reached the lake, and was never planned to do so, the terminus of the railway was in the parish, thereby giving the railway its name. Tourism is now one of the principle industries in the area, and the hamlet includes a hotel and public house.

The parish church, St Mary's, dates from the 13th century, with the present structure dating from around 1590. It is a Grade II* listed building. John David Edwards, a cleric and hymn tune composer, is buried in the churchyard.
