= Ceiswyn Formation =

Geologic formation in Wales

- Stratigraphic range: Hirnantian
- The cliffs of Graig Goch which expose the Ceiswyn Formation
- Type: Group
- Unit of: Ogwen Group
- Underlies: Nod Glas Formation
- Overlies: Craig-y-Llam Formation
- Thickness: Typically 1,400 m (4,600 ft), up to 1,550 m (5,090 ft) at the western end

Lithology
- Primary: Mudstone
- Other: Siltstone

Location
- Coordinates: 52°39′39″N 3°53′57″W
- Region: Mid Wales
- Country: Wales

Type section
- Named for: Nant Ceiswyn

The Ceiswyn Formation (also known as the Ceiswyn Beds) is an Ordovician lithostratigraphic group (a sequence of rock strata) in Mid Wales. The rock of the formation is made up of interleaved beds of silty mudstones and siltstones with some sandstones and tuffs also present in small amounts. The formation runs diagonally across Mid Wales from close by Llyn Tegid (Bala Lake) to Cardigan Bay near Tywyn.

Previous names for the rocks that form this unit include the Nant Hir Mudstone(s), the Nant Hir Group and the Allt Ddu Formation.

== Outcrops ==
The formation is exposed in a number of locations in Mid Wales where glacial valleys cut across it. It is especially visible in the cliffs of Graig Goch.

== Fossil content ==
Harnagian-Soudleyan trilobites have been found in the rocks of the Ceiswyn Formation near Dinas Mawddwy.
