= Mawddach Group =

Geological group in Gwynedd, Wales

- Stratigraphic range: mid to late Cambrian
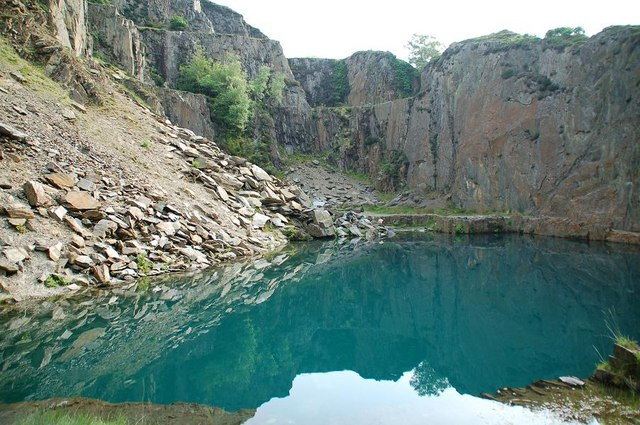
- Slates of the Dolgellau Formation exposed in the Golwen quarry, near Fairbourne
- Type: Group
- Sub-units: Dol-cyn-Afon Formation, Dolgellau Formation, Ffestiniog Flags Formation, Maentwrog Formation, Clogau Formation
- Overlies: Harlech Grits Group
- Thickness: about 2,400 m (7,900 ft)

Lithology
- Primary: mudstones
- Other: sandstones, siltstones

Location
- Region: northwest Wales
- Country: United Kingdom

Type section
- Named for: Afon Mawddach (river)

The Mawddach Group is a middle to upper Cambrian lithostratigraphic group (a sequence of rock strata) in Gwynedd, Wales. The name is derived from the river known as the Afon Mawddach.

== Outcrops ==
The rocks are exposed across the Harlech Dome and southern Snowdonia.

== Lithology and stratigraphy ==
The Group comprises around 2400m thickness of mudstones, sandstones and siltstones laid down in the marine Welsh Basin during the middle to late Cambrian period. The Group comprises (in descending order i.e. oldest last) the Dol-cyn-Afon Formation, the Dolgellau Formation, the Ffestiniog Flags Formation, the Maentwrog Formation and the Clogau Formation.
