= Geology of West Sussex =

Geology of English county

The geology of West Sussex in southeast England comprises a succession of sedimentary rocks of Cretaceous age overlain in the south by sediments of Palaeogene age. The sequence of strata from both periods consists of a variety of sandstones, mudstones, siltstones and limestones. These sediments were deposited within the Hampshire and Weald basins. Erosion subsequent to large scale but gentle folding associated with the Alpine Orogeny has resulted in the present outcrop pattern across the county, dominated by the north facing chalk scarp of the South Downs. The bedrock is overlain by a suite of Quaternary deposits of varied origin. Parts of both the bedrock and these superficial deposits have been worked for a variety of minerals for use in construction, industry and agriculture.

== Jurassic and older rocks ==
A sequence of sedimentary rocks of Jurassic age has been proved to underlie the Cretaceous succession but nowhere within the county does it appear at the surface. Beneath these again, boreholes have proven Devonian and Carboniferous rocks and possible Permo-Triassic strata.

== Cretaceous ==
The Lower Cretaceous comprises a sequence of stratigraphic groups from the Purbeck Group through the Wealden and Lower Greensand groups to the Selborne Group. The lowermost/earliest of these are present at depth but do not outcrop at the surface. The oldest strata to outcrop at the surface within West Sussex are the sandstones and siltstones of the Ashdown Formation of the Purbeck Group which date from around 146-134 million years ago.

The younger Upper Cretaceous is represented by the rocks of the Chalk Group, overwhelmingly the characteristic fine-grained white limestone known as chalk.

=== Purbeck Group ===
This group is composed of a lower Ashdown Formation, overlain by the Wadhurst Clay Formation and an upper Tunbridge Wells Sand Formation. The last is itself subdivided thus:

- 'Upper Tunbridge Wells Sand' (informal term)
- Grinstead Clay Member (divided into an 'upper' and a 'lower' part by the Cuckfield Stone Bed)
- Ardingly Sandstone Member
- 'Lower Tunbridge Wells Sand' (informal term)

The rocks traditionally referred to as the Hastings Beds form the High Weald in the northeast of the county. These sandstones, mudstones, siltstones and clays date from the Valanginian to the Berriasian (141-133 million years ago).

=== Wealden Group ===
The Weald Clay Formation occurs throughout the Weald in the north and east of the county. It consists of interbedded sandstone, mudstone and siltstone and some ironstone units dating from Hauterivian to Barremian times (146-125mya).

=== Lower Greensand Group ===
Strata of the Lower Greensand Group occupies a tract of country parallel to and north of the South Downs though separated from that escarpment by the outcrop of Selborne Group rocks. It roughly defines the edge of the Weald. From oldest to youngest, the Lower Greensand Group consists of the Atherfield Clay, Hythe, Sandgate and Folkestone Formation which were deposited during the Aptian age between 125 and 113 million years ago. Its thickness varies from around 250m to as much as 300m. It largely consists of sands and sandstones with silts and clays in places.

The lowermost unit is the Atherfield Clay Formation consisting of silty clays and clayey silts which are overlain by the fine to coarse-grained sandstones of the Hythe Formation which is glauconitic in part and which also contains Fuller's earth and clay units. Above this is the Sandgate Formation at the base of which is the Easebourne Member. Overlying divisions of the formation include the Fittleworth, Rogate, Selham Ironshot Sands, Pulborough Sandrock and Marehill Clay members. These are generally sands, silts and clays. The uppermost unit of the group is the Folkestone Formation consisting of fine to coarse-grained sandstones with a clay unit.

=== Selborne Group ===
Stratigraphically above the Lower Greensand Group is the Selborne Group which comprises a suite of mudstones, siltstones, sandstones and limestones laid down during the Albian age between 112 and 94 million years ago. It divides into an earlier Gault Formation and a later Upper Greensand Formation. These outcrop in a thin tract of country, typically 1–2 km in width, at the foot of the north-facing South Downs scarp.

The Gault Formation comprises clays, mudstone, sandstone and limestone whilst the overlying Upper Greensand Formation comprises siltstones and fine-grained sandstones.

=== Chalk Group ===
Overlying the Selborne Group is the Chalk Group, a suite of limestones of Upper Cretaceous age which is formally divided into a lower/older Grey Chalk Subgroup (of Cenomanian age) and an upper/later White Chalk Subgroup (of Cenomanian to Campanian age). The Grey Chalk corresponds to the traditional Lower Chalk division and comprises 15-25m of the West Melbury Marly Chalk Formation overlain by 35-75m of the Zig Zag Chalk Formation. The White Chalk corresponds to the traditional Middle and Upper Chalk divisions and comprises up to 35m of the Holywell Nodular Chalk Formation, overlain successively by the New Pit Chalk, Lewes Nodular Chalk, Seaford Chalk, Newhaven Chalk, Culver Chalk and Portsdown Chalk formations. Each of these formations had 'member' status in earlier descriptions of the succession. There are marls present in some of these formations and bands of flint nodules occur to varying degrees in each of these units.

The main outcrop of the Chalk forms the South Downs, the West Sussex portion of which runs broadly westwards from Brighton to the county's western border with Hampshire. Further outcrops are concealed beneath Quaternary sediments in a discontinuous low-lying strip from Worthing, north of Chichester to the Hampshire border.

== Palaeogene ==
=== Lambeth Group ===
Clays, sands and gravels constitute the larger part of the Reading Formation (formerly known as the Reading Beds), a unit assigned to the Lambeth Group within the Ypresian and Lutetian stage/age (66-56mya). These strata run west from the coast at South Lancing. Further west though usually obscured, these rocks outcrop along the foot of the broadly east-west aligned chalk ridge of Ports Down to the Arundel area and further west again reach to the Meon Valley north of Fareham.

=== Thames Group ===
The London Clay Formation is an assortment of deposits including clay, silts, sands and gravels laid down during the early Eocene (Ypresian) between 55 and 49 million years ago and which with the thin Harwich Formation constitute the Thames Group totalling 110m in thickness. A Bognor Sand Member and a Barn Rock Member form part of the London Clay sequence in the Bognor Regis area. London Clay underlies parts of Worthing and ground north of Angmering and Arundel.

=== Bracklesham Group ===
Deposited during early to middle Eocene times (56-34mya i.e. Late Ypresian to middle Lutetian) and consist of around 120m thickness of sands, silts and clays underlie the Selsey or Manhood peninsula in the southwest of the county. These strata are almost wholly obscured by Quaternary deposits. They comprise the Wittering, Earnley Sand, Marsh Farm and Selsey Sand formations.

== Structure ==
West Sussex extends across a part of the Weald-Artois Anticline, a broad east-west aligned fold associated with the Alpine Orogeny. This largely gentle fold sports lesser folds on its southern flanks such as the sub-parallel Portsdown Anticline runs from just north of Fareham in Hampshire east via Wymering to the southern edge of Chichester. A similar fold structure continues east from here, but offset en echelon to the south as the Littlehampton Anticline. The Portsdown Anticline is separated from the Weald-Artois fold by the Chichester Syncline (which continues west into Hampshire as the Bere Forest Syncline) and intervenes between the Littlehampton Anticline and the Weald-Artois Anticline.

Other faults and folds are mapped along a similar broadly east-west trend, notable amongst these being the paired Singleton Anticline and Littlewood Syncline in the general vicinity of the village of Singleton in the Lavant valley. The Sayers Common and Garstons Farm faults follow a similar trend in the area west of Burgess Hill.

== Quaternary ==
A range of superficial deposits have been laid down across parts of Sussex during the last 2.6 million years. Amongst the most widespread are river and coastal alluvium and river terrace deposits. Inland of Arundel, seven distinct terraces have been identified and mapped within the valleys of the River Arun and its tributary, the River Rother. Three river terrace deposits are identified on the River Adur inland from Bramber.

Also common are patches of locally derived materials such as clay-with-flints and head, the latter including clays, sands and gravels which in the dry valleys of the Downs have a chalky and flinty composition. Along the coastal zone, wind-blown deposits of brick earth, mostly silt, are widespread as are sands and gravels whose age and origin are uncertain.

== Economic geology ==
Brick clay has been worked from many parts of the geological succession in West Sussex including from some Quaternary clay deposits, from the Reading, London Clay and Bracklesham formations in the Palaeogene sequence and from the Gault, Atherfield Clay and Weald Clay formations and from the Grinstead Clay and Wadhurst Clay members in the Cretaceous sequence. The material was used for the production of both bricks and tiles though many sites were no longer in production by 1998. Chalk has been quarried for use as fill, for agricultural lime and in cement manufacture. Chalk is an important aquifer and continues to provide the larger part of West Sussex's water supply. Sandstone for use as a building stone has been worked in the Upper Greensand, Hythe and Weald Clay formations. In the Weald, the Horsham Stone, Cuckfield Stone and Ardingly Sandstone have all been quarried for building purposes. Sand and crushed sandstone have been gained from within the Folkestone and Hythe formations for use as either aggregate or construction sand. Ironstone was worked historically in the Weald Clay Formation for the production of iron.

== Geoconservation ==
Certain locations in West Sussex are afforded some protection against developments which may be detrimental to their geological interest through being designated as one or more of the following:

=== Local geological sites ===
A geodiversity survey of the whole of Sussex carried out by the Sussex Biodiversity Record Centre with West Sussex County Council between 2010 and 2012 produced many locations which are now afforded recognition as 'Local geological sites' (formerly referred to as 'Regionally Important Geodiversity Sites' or simply 'RIGS'). Candidate sites had been identified between 1993 and 2006 by a voluntary group operating from Brighton's Booth Museum of Natural History.

=== Sites of Special Scientific Interest ===
The following SSSI's have been designated within West Sussex due either wholly or in part to their geological interest: Beeding Hill to Newtimber Hill, Bognor Quarry Common, Bognor Reef, Bracklesham Bay, Chantry Mill, Chichester Harbour, Coneyhurst Cutting, Coppedhall Hanger, Eartham Pit, Boxgrove, Felpham, Freshfield Lane, Horton Clay Pit, Marehill Quarry, Park Farm Cutting, Perry Copse Outcrops, Philpot's and Hook Quarries, Scaynes Hill, Selsey East Beach, Slinfold Stream and Quarry, Stone Hill Rocks, Turners Hill, Wakehurst and Chiddingly Woods, Warnham and West Hoathly.

== See also ==
- Geology of the United Kingdom
- Geology of England
