= Geology of the South Downs National Park =

The geology of the South Downs National Park in South East England comprises a gently folded succession of sedimentary rocks from the Cretaceous and early Palaeogene periods overlain in places by a range of superficial deposits from the last 2.6 million years. Whereas the South Downs are formed from the Late Cretaceous age chalk, the South Downs National Park extends into the Weald to the north of the range and thereby includes older rock strata dating from the Early Cretaceous including sandstones and mudstones. The youngest solid rocks are found on the southern fringes of the National Park in the eastern extension of the Hampshire Basin and include sand, silt and clay deposited during the Palaeocene and Eocene epochs.

== Early Cretaceous strata ==
The oldest rocks encountered within the National Park are those of the Weald Clay Formation which stratigraphers place within the Wealden Group. They comprise a mix of sandstones, mudstones and limestones from the Hauterivian (c.139-129 Ma (million years ago)) and Barremian (c.129-124 Ma) stages. These are succeeded (overlain) by the sandstones, mudstones and clays of the Lower Greensand Group. Four formations are present, within one of which five members are identifiable as mappable units. All were laid down during the Aptian stage (c.126-113 Ma), though the Folkestone Formation extends into the succeeding Albian stage (c.113-100.5 Ma). These strata are (uppermost/youngest at top):

- Folkestone Formation (sandstone)
- Sandgate Formation
  - Marehill Clay Member (mudstone)
  - Pulborough Sandrock Member (sandstone)
  - Selham Ironshot Sands Member (sandstone)
  - Fittleworth Member
  - Easebourne Member
- Hythe Formation (sandstone)
- Atherfield Clay Formation

Overlying the Lower Greensand are the two formations which comprise the Selborne Group; the Albian age Gault Formation and the Upper Greensand Formation which extends from the Albian into the Cenomanian (c.100.5-94 Ma) thereby straddling the boundary with the Late Cretaceous epoch. The highest point in the South Downs National Park is the 280m Black Down south of Haslemere, the summit of which is formed from sandstone of the Hythe Formation.

== Chalk ==
Chalk is the rock type associated most closely with the National Park and, in common with the chalk which provides other key landscape features in the southeast of England, was formed by the settling to the sea floor of myriad coccoliths (microscopic plates of calcium carbonate formed by single-celled algae known as coccolithophores) during the Late Cretaceous epoch between about 100 and 70 million years ago. The Chalk Group which includes all of the different units which make up the succession in England, is subdivided into an earlier/lower Grey Chalk Subgroup and a later/higher White Chalk Subgroup. The Chalk has previously been subdivided in other ways and references to Upper, Middle and Lower abound in the literature and on geological maps. The Chalk is not homogeneous and within these two subgroups, numerous further units are distinguished, each with their own characteristics.

=== Grey Chalk Subgroup ===
The Grey Chalk Subgroup within the National Park is divided into two formations, an earlier West Melbury Marly Chalk Formation (within which the Glauconitic Marl Member is recognised) and a later Zig Zag Chalk Formation. All originate during the Cenomanian (100.5-94 Ma). The Grey Chalk is often described as marly, having a higher content of insoluble material - largely clay – than the White Chalk, and leading to it being less permeable.

=== White Chalk Subgroup ===
The White Chalk Subgroup is locally divided into six formations, the uppermost of which is further subdivided into two members. Two distinct members are also identified within the lowermost formation. Ranging from Cenomanian to Campanian (c.84-72 Ma) in age, these strata are (uppermost/youngest at top):

- Culver Chalk Formation
  - Spetisbury Chalk Member
  - Tarrant Chalk Member
- Newhaven Chalk Formation
- Seaford Chalk Formation
- Lewes Nodular Chalk Formation
- New Pit Chalk Formation
- Holywell Nodular Chalk Formation
  - Melbourn Rock Member
  - Plenus Marl Member

The White Chalk is generally a more pure limestone and usually forms the main scarp face. Amongst the exceptions are the ‘Plenus Marls’ which are a grey/green marly chalk up to 3m thick whilst the Melbourn Rock is a hard cream-coloured nodular chalk up to 5m thick. The Newhaven Chalk typically forms a secondary scarp some distance to the south of the main scarp, and much less continuous in nature. Bands of flint nodules occur throughout the chalk but are more numerous in parts of the succession than others. Flint is a variety of chert, a microcrystalline or cryptocrystalline form of quartz the mode of formation of which is still debated.

== Palaeogene strata ==
There are no rocks recorded within the area from the last part of the Cretaceous (the Maastrichtian age) nor the earliest parts of the following Paleogene period (Danian and Selandian ages).

=== Lambeth Group ===
A succession of sands, silts and clays date back to the Thanetian (c.59-56 Ma) and Ypresian (c.56-48 Ma) ages and named as the Lambeth Group. The Woolwich and Reading formations within this Group contain some thin lignites and shell beds in places. These rocks lie unconformably on an eroded surface of the Culver Chalk Formation and in places, the uppermost Newhaven Chalk.

=== Thames Group ===
Three formations occur within the boundaries of the National Park; uppermost/youngest at top, these strata are:

- Earnley Sand Formation (sand, silt & clay)
- Wittering Formation (sand, silt & clay)
- London Clay Formation (clay, silt, sand)

== Geological structures ==
Geological strata within the area are flat-lying to moderately dipping. The major structure within southeast England is the Wealden Anticline, itself a part of the larger Weald-Artois Anticline, an upward folding of the entire Cretaceous succession along a broadly east-west axis. The South Downs are the eroded remnant of the southern limb of this regional-scale fold, paired with the North Downs which represent the opposing limb of this 'unroofed' elongate dome. The southerly dipping chalk beds of the South Downs present one of the major escarpments to be found in Britain. A feature originating from the same tectonic causes is the Greensand Ridge, a significant north-facing scarp formed by the Lower Greensand (in particular the Hythe Beds sandstone) west of the Arun valley. The scarp runs sub-parallel to that of the chalk as far as Combe Hill, southeast of Liss where it turns to the northeast to exit the national park near Haslemere.

To the south are the broadly parallel Portsdown and Littlehampton anticlines, separated from the Wealden Anticline by the Chichester Syncline. The synclinal axis comes ashore at Lancing (albeit the bedrock is thickly concealed by other deposits) and can be traced WNW to the south of Arundel. It passes through the fringes of the national park between West Durrington and Crossbush. A further gentle anticline is mapped running from the vicinity of Hailsham west towards Brighton and named as the Kingston-Beddingham Anticline. It is paired with the Caburn Syncline running through Lewes to its north. Each of these folds was formed during a phase of the Alpine Orogeny. Geological faults are inferred to run beneath the Moulsecoomb valley and the lower section of the Cuckmere valley whilst minor faults have been mapped elsewhere within the national park.

== Quaternary landscape evolution and superficial deposits ==
Southeast England was not glaciated during the Quaternary period i.e. the last 2.6 million years but was subject to severe climate at times that has contributed to the shape of today’s landscape. It is theorised that many of the coombes which scallop the scarp of the South Downs were excavated by surface water flowing over perennially frozen ground thus rendering the normally permeable chalk impermeable. Frost action and solifluction will also have been contributors to their development.

=== Clay-with-flints and head ===
The British Geological Survey map numerous residual deposits across the upper surfaces of the South Downs, derived from the solution, decalcification and cryoturbation of the underlying bedrock. Referred to as the Clay-with-flints Formation, the deposit also contains sand and silt in places. It varies from 0 to 10m in thickness but can exceed this where it fills solution hollows. Where this and/or other material has moved down steeper slopes during the post-glacial period, it is referred to as head. Head deposits are present in the base of most of the dry valleys which penetrate the Downs.

=== Effects of sea level changes ===
The Itchen, Meon, Lavant, Arun, Adur, Ouse and Cuckmere rivers each cut through the chalk ridge of the Downs conveying water from their north to the English Channel to the south. During times of lowered sea level as during the Last Glacial Period, each river was rejuvenated and cut down into its bed. As sea levels recovered to levels similar to today, the lower parts of the valleys were inundated by the sea to become rias. River-borne sediments (sand, silt and clay) then progressively infilled the rias. In places, similar material forms not only the modern floodplain but also river terraces perched at some height above it as a remnant of an earlier floodplain when sea levels were temporarily higher than those of today.

=== Beach and tidal flats ===
Shingle, sand and gravel etc occur around the mouths of the Cuckmere and Ouse rivers. A storm beach extends from the mouth of the Ouse southeast to the end of the esplanade at Seaford. Sediments around Arundel are regarded as raised marine deposits. Each of these deposits is of Holocene age.

=== Artificial ground ===
Ground surfaces which have been raised or otherwise formed by human activity are classed as artificial. They include railway and major road embankments, together with quarry spoil and landfill for example. Small examples occur throughout the national park. Some of the more striking examples are those at Midhurst which are associated with the former Midhurst Brickworks.

=== Landslide deposits ===
Rock debris at the foot of the high chalk cliffs at Beachy Head at the eastern extremity of the national park is landslide material. Cliff falls are common on the steep to vertical chalk cliffs of this coast, though most lie just outside of the national park. Several areas of landslip occur in the vicinity of Petersfield and north towards Farnham at the junction of the Gault with the overlying Upper Greensand.

== Conservation and recreation ==
Of the many Sites of Special Scientific Interest within the national park, ten are designated for their geological interest:

- Brighton to Newhaven Cliffs
- Seaford to Beachy Head
- Beeding to Newtimber Hill
- Butser Hill
- Eartham Pit
- Horton Clay Pit
- Southerham Machine Bottom Pit
- Southerham Grey Pit
- Southerham Works Pit
- Asham Quarry

In addition to these, 50 sites have been designated as Local Geological Sites. Sussex Heritage Coast was the first to be defined in England and Wales and protects the chalk-cliffed coast of the national park around Beachy Head and the Seven Sisters.

The South Downs Way is a national trail which takes advantage of the north-facing chalk escarpment of the South Downs as it extends for the length of the national park from the margins of Eastbourne in the east to Winchester in the west.

== See also ==
- Geology of East Sussex
- Geology of West Sussex
- Geology of Hampshire
