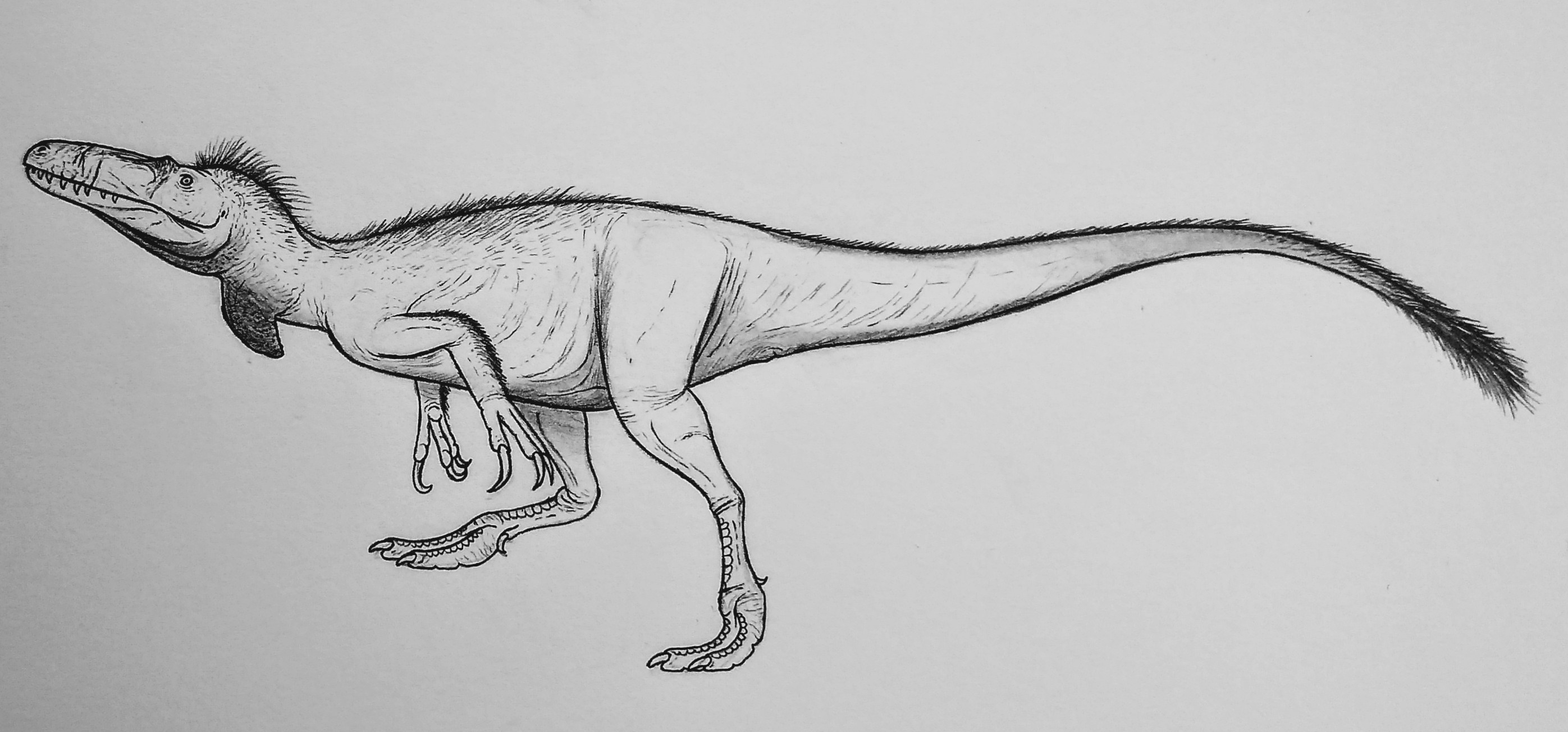
- Hypothetical life restoration as a megaraptoran

Scientific classification
- Domain: Eukaryota
- Kingdom: Animalia
- Phylum: Chordata
- Clade: Dinosauria
- Clade: Saurischia
- Clade: Theropoda
- Clade: Tetanurae
- Family: incertae sedis
- Genus: †Vectaerovenator; Barker et al., 2020
- Species: †V. inopinatus

Binomial name
- †Vectaerovenator inopinatus Barker et al., 2020

= Vectaerovenator =

Vectaerovenator Temporal range: Late Aptian, ~116 Ma

Genus of reptiles (fossil)

Vectaerovenator (meaning "Isle of Wight air-filled hunter" due to the pneumaticity of the vertebrae) is a genus of tetanuran theropod from the Early Cretaceous period of what is now England (Lower Greensand Group; Ferruginous Sands). It contains one species, Vectaerovenator inopinatus; its holotype, consisting of the specimens IWCMS 2020.400, 2020.407, and 2019.84, comprises two anterior dorsal vertebrae, a cervical vertebra and a mid‐caudal vertebra from the late Aptian Ferruginous Sands of the Isle of Wight in southern England, discovered in 2019. Comparative anatomical analysis shows that this taxon shares homoplastic features with megalosauroids, carcharodontosaurs, and some coelurosaurs, and cannot be reliably placed beyond Tetanurae incertae sedis, but has enough autapomorphies that it can be considered a valid genus.

== Discovery and Naming ==
In 2019, Robin Ward, a regular fossil hunter found material belonging to Vectaerovenator while on a visit with his family. Another person, James Lockyer also found material as did Paul Farrell, amassing to the 4 vertebrae and one rib recovered. The bones were then analyzed by Chris Barker, who led the study with his colleagues. It was determined to be a new species and was given the name Vectaerovenator inopinatus, meaning air-filled hunter, due to amount of air spaces found in the recovered vertebrae. More potential material has turned up since its original discovery belonging in private collections. These might eventually find their way to a museum, where they can be analyzed. It was further determined that the material found belonged to one individual due to its general location, both in time and space, and the common similarity between the four vertebrae (this being the texture, and overall size).

== Description ==
When described in 2020 by Chris Barker and colleagues, it was hypothesized the holotype of Vectaerovenator would have been estimated to have measured at around 4 metres (13 ft) long based on the vertebrae, and the size they would potentially range from individual to individual. However the authors also noted that due to sutures in the recovered material, Vectaerovenator was not at full size, and would be somewhat larger than was estimated when fully grown. Based on the overall shape of the four vertebrae recovered, it was determined that at least one of the vertebrae belonged in the neck, two in the upper back, and one vertebra belonged in the tail.

== Classification ==
As the material recovered is very fragmentary, it is very unclear where this animal stands in terms of its taxonomy. When it was examined it was first thought to be a megaraptoran, but the authors did eventually recover it as a possible basal tyrannosauroid, although this also was done with some level of uncertainty, as it could easily belong under the superfamilies Allosauroidea or Megalosauroidea. It is, (with the exception of a few undiagnostic teeth), the youngest theropod taxon to be discovered in the British Mesozoic yet.
