= Vectis Formation =

Geological formation with diverse fossils, Isle of Wight

- Stratigraphic range: Barremian; ~125 Ma
- Type: Geological formation
- Unit of: Wealden Group
- Sub-units: Shepherds Chine, Barnes High Sandstone & Cowleaze Chine Members
- Underlies: Atherfield Clay Formation
- Overlies: Wessex Formation
- Thickness: Up to 66 m (217 ft)

Lithology
- Primary: Siltstone, mudstone
- Other: Sandstone, limestone, ironstone

Location
- Coordinates: 50.7°N 1.1°W
- Approximate paleocoordinates: 40.8°N 9.7°E
- Region: England
- Country: United Kingdom
- Extent: Dorset, Isle of Wight
- Vectis Formation (England)

The Vectis Formation is a geological formation on the Isle of Wight and Swanage, England whose strata were formed in the Barremian, approximately 125 million years ago. The environment of deposition was that of a freshwater coastal lagoon with occasional marine influence after the early Aptian marine transgression, transitioning from the floodplain environment of the underlying Wessex Formation. The primary lithology is of laminated grey mudstones. The Vectis Formation is composed of three geological members: the Shepherds Chine member, the Barnes High Sandstone member, and the Cowleaze Chine member. It is overlain by the fully marine Atherfield Clay Formation, part of the Lower Greensand Group. Dinosaur remains are among the fossils that have been recovered from the formation.

== Fauna ==
- Theropod tracks
- Polacanthus foxii
- Hypsilophodon foxii
- Euornithopoda indet.
- Euornithopod tracks
- Mantellisaurus atherfieldensis
- Spinosaurinae indet.
- Vectocleidus pastorum
- Hylaeochampsa vectiana

== See also ==
- List of dinosaur-bearing rock formations
