= Geology of Surrey =

Geology of English county

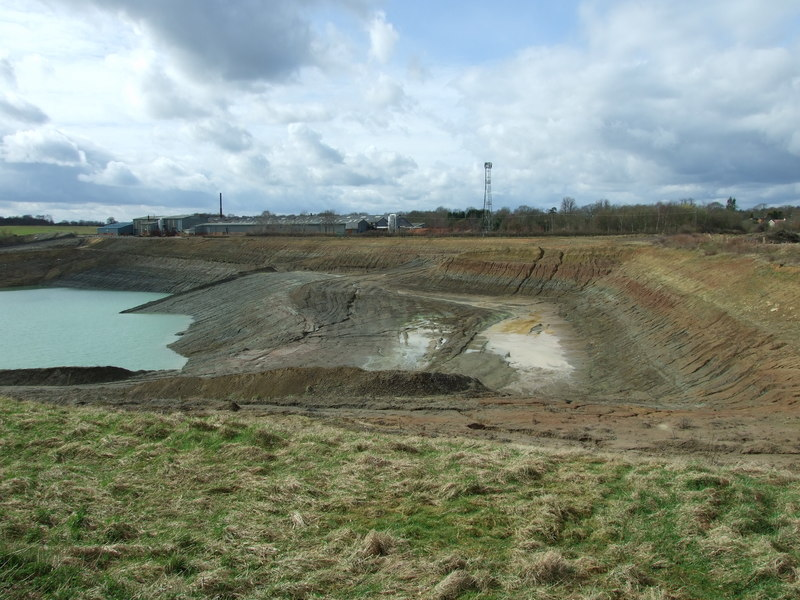
Strata of the Weald Clay Formation (Lower Cretaceous) at Clock House Clay Pit near Capel

The geology of Surrey is dominated by sedimentary strata from the Cretaceous, overlaid by clay and superficial deposits from the Cenozoic.

== Cretaceous strata ==
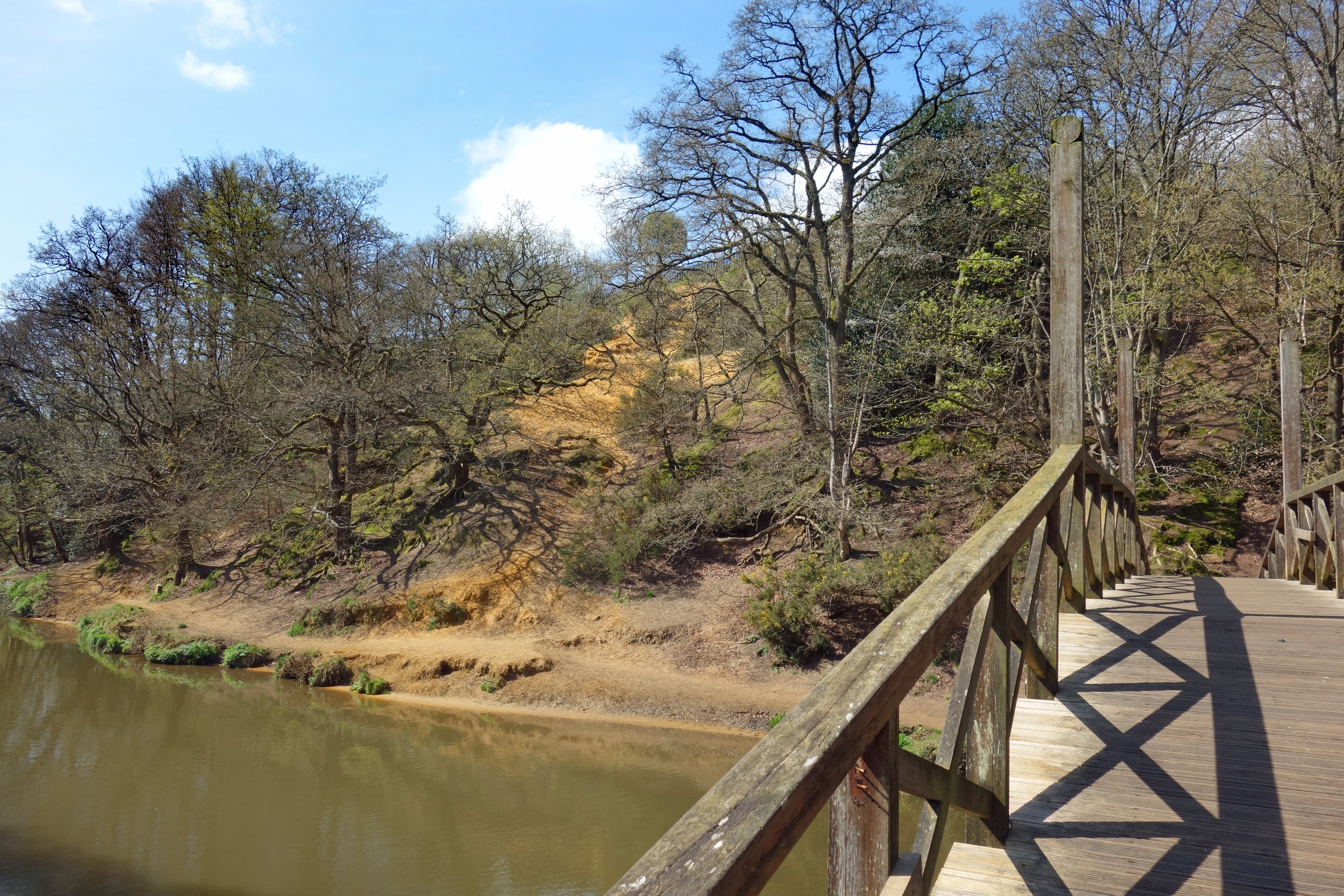
This sandy bank has been exposed by the River Wey as it cuts through the Upper Greensand stratum (mid Cretaceous) near Shalford

During the Early Cretaceous epoch (from about 145 to about 100 million years ago) Surrey alternated between a fresh-to-brackish water embayment depositing Hastings Beds and Weald Clay, comprising shales and mudstones that are often finely banded. Offshore muds (now shales and mudstones) of the Atherfield Clay were deposited followed by shallow marine sands of the Hythe, Sandgate and Folkestone Beds. Where not eroded to lower heights, there is then a marine layer of the sands of the Hythe Beds topped by chert seen on today's remaining Greensand Hills. Instead of the mudstone and sandstone-producing three beds mentioned before Hythe Beds, west of Dorking the marine Bargate Beds made of calcareous (chalk and limestone-rich) sandstone were deposited. The Folkestone Beds contain phosphatic and iron-rich nodules, which locally yield a rich fossil fauna of marine shells.

Then under even deeper seas, Gault Clay and the Upper Greensand were deposited. The Gault Clay contains phosphate-rich nodules in discrete bands and has a rich marine fauna with abundant ammonites, bivalves and gastropods. The Upper Greensand comprises a variety of sediments with fine silts at the base giving way upwards into sandstones.

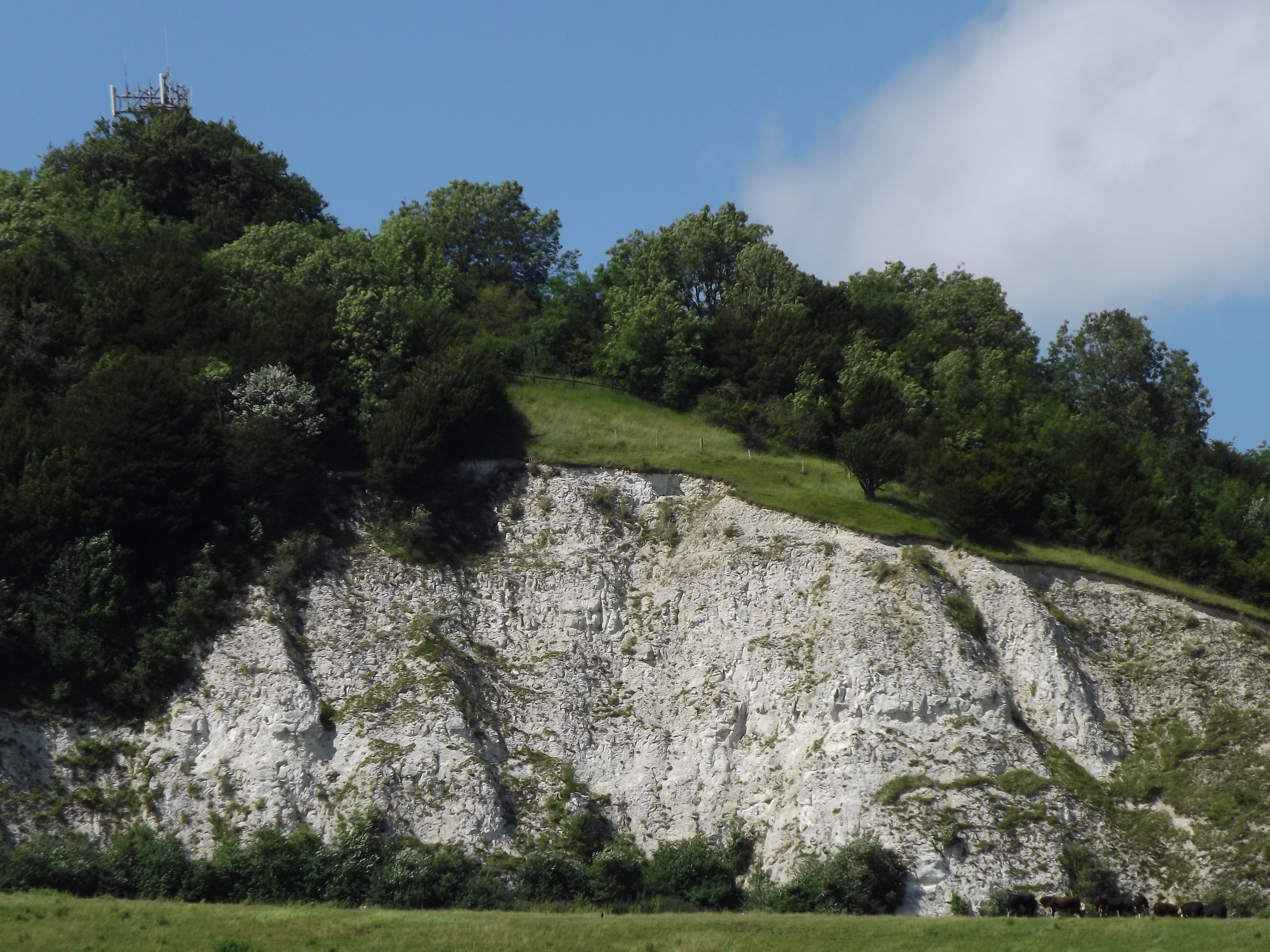
The exposed chalk workings of the former Betchworth Quarry (Upper Cretaceous strata) on the south-facing scarp slope of Box Hill

90 million years ago the North Downs hard chalk was deposited, a white limestone which is over 95% calcium carbonate. It contains thin beds of marl and nodules of flint, either scattered or in bands. The North Downs extending from Farnham to Dover, Kent are formed by this chalk. They now have an often white, almost vertical south-facing slope.

== Cenozoic strata ==
Just before the Paleogene, which included the mass-extinction event of the non-avian dinosaurs, sea levels dropped, exposing Sussex and Kent, and the marine Upnor Beds were deposited in Surrey. In the Paleogene, Southern England rose slightly, and the seas retreated, and the reddish and mottled clays of the Reading Beds were deposited by a large river sand delta system. Later, a rise in sea level, around 50 million years ago, caused widespread deposition, until 2 million years ago, of the London Clay across the County. The London Clay is a bluish-grey marine clay with isolated pockets of fossils especially where chalkier. The youngest part of the London Clay is known as the Claygate Beds and occurs widely in Surrey. This even sandier material represents a transition between the deeper water London Clay and the succeeding shallower water, possibly estuarine, Bagshot Sand.

Major climate changes in Britain causing sea level changes in the last 2.58 million years, with mini Ice Ages, the ice sheets did not extend to Surrey but sand and gravel deposits swept towards the fledgling River Thames were spread in all lower parts. Gravel terraces at various heights on the valley sides are the remnants of successive floodplains, the highest terrace being the oldest and the lowest the youngest. The most prominent terraces mark the former levels of the Thames in north Surrey. Along tributary slopes, a deposit, head, forms the main sediment of latest age. Head comprises angular pieces of rock and soil derived locally from the extensive frost-shattering of rocks and the subsequent movement of this material down valley slopes. Large areas of clay-with-flints, derived from the weathering of material overlying the present day chalk, occur across the North Downs. One particular suite of sediments that occur in the Guildford vale is known as the Headley Formation and comprises gravel and sand on top of the chalk. These sediments contain marine fossils and were probably derived from erosion of the Greensand and Tertiary rocks during the Paleogene.

A large geological fold, the Wealden anticline, is the major rock structure in the county. This anticline was formed by the Alpine orogeny about 25 to 12 million years ago.

== Soils ==
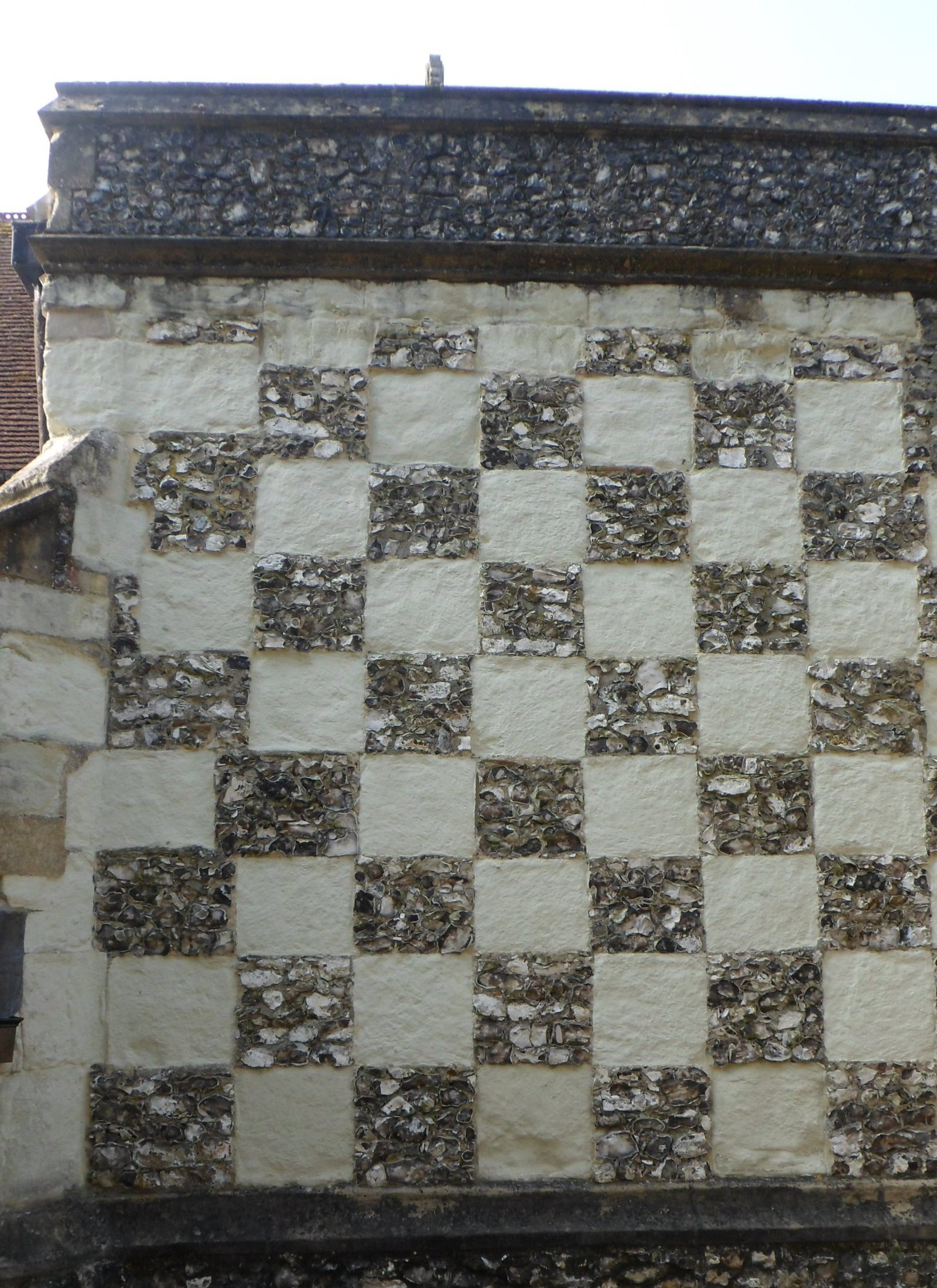
The wall of this side chapel at St Michael's Church, Mickleham is built with locally quarried flint and clunch arranged in a checkerboard pattern, in an homage to the flag of Surrey.

The northeast of the county, such as the north of Tandridge (district), is in the wide part of the North Downs. Thus from the east, Tatsfield has two western pockets of slightly acid, loamy soils with free drainage otherwise has the expected shallow, lime-rich soil over chalk or limestone of the escarpment with lower parts of the escarpment summit here, where that topsoil has eroded, having slightly acid, loamy and clayey soils with impeded drainage soil. Westward, the shallow lime is found all the way along the North Downs to the western border, past Guildford only a few hundred metres narrow to Farnham Castle and even Dippenhall, the latter accompaniment is found on both sides only to Buckland, well before Dorking. A horseshoe of land including the rise north of Godstone of Godstone Hill that leads to the escarpment is free draining lime-rich loamy soil (i.e. alkaline). Continuing with the Downs, in a broad band, the far northern type soil slopes such as near Croydon come across the Surrey border at Banstead and Ewell, which is free draining, slightly acid but base-rich soils, producing extremely fertile pastures and deciduous woodland, which becomes the edging for both sides of the high escarpment at Box Hill and is just found for a brief while in a middle section in Polesden Lacey then throughout the northern slope carrying on westward. Chipstead, Banstead and Tadworth have the first free draining slightly acid loamy soil that tops the wider downs to Guildford and is found around Dorking and the across the Vale of Holmesdale north of the Greensand Hills.

Equally it is this topsoil north of the Thames across Spelthorne (such as around Ashford) and west of the Thames in the east of Runnymede (such as around Thorpe): here the land is flat flood plain, mostly silt mixed with lime-rich London Clay.

Between the Thames and the North Downs the land is overall slightly lower than south of the Downs but is less in the current flood plain, drained by the tributaries mentioned. There is more loam persisting the further from the alluvial plain of the Thames and tributaries; from the southbank at Thames Ditton (near Hampton Court southwest to Ripley, Send and Old Woking is still more free draining slightly acid loamy soil. Impeded drainage but rarely waterlogged soil features in Addlestone, north Knaphill and around Perry Hill, Worplesdon while Chobham lies in loamy soils with naturally high groundwater producing wet acid meadow and woodland edged by streamside fen/peat marshy brooklands.

Heath: in Esher, Oxshott, Weybridge, Wisley, all around Woking, Brookwood, Deepcut, Pirbright, Frimley, Lightwater, Camberley, Chobham Common, Virginia Water and Ottershaw is naturally wet, very acid sandy and loamy soil which is just 1.9% of English soil and 0.2% of Welsh soil, which gives rise to pines and coniferous landscapes, such as pioneered at Wentworth and Foxhills estate (now spa, hotel, restaurant and golf club) by pro-American Independence statesman Charles James Fox.

South, but not beyond the North Downs and to the south of the Greensand Ridge is slowly permeable loamy/clayey slightly acid but base-rich soil forming a 3–4-mile-wide (5–6 km) band from Ewell and Claygate through Leatherhead, Little Bookham, the north side of Guildford to Farnham, whereas South of the Greensand is some 20–15 miles (30–25 km) thick (with some areas of free then poor drainage around East Grinstead/Felbridge). The Greensand ridge itself has the heath soil above and zones of slightly acid only freely draining sandy soils, which make those areas more densely wooded such as Thursley, Brook, Churt, Seale, Runfold and Puttenham.
