= Faringdon Sand =

- Stratigraphic range: Aptian
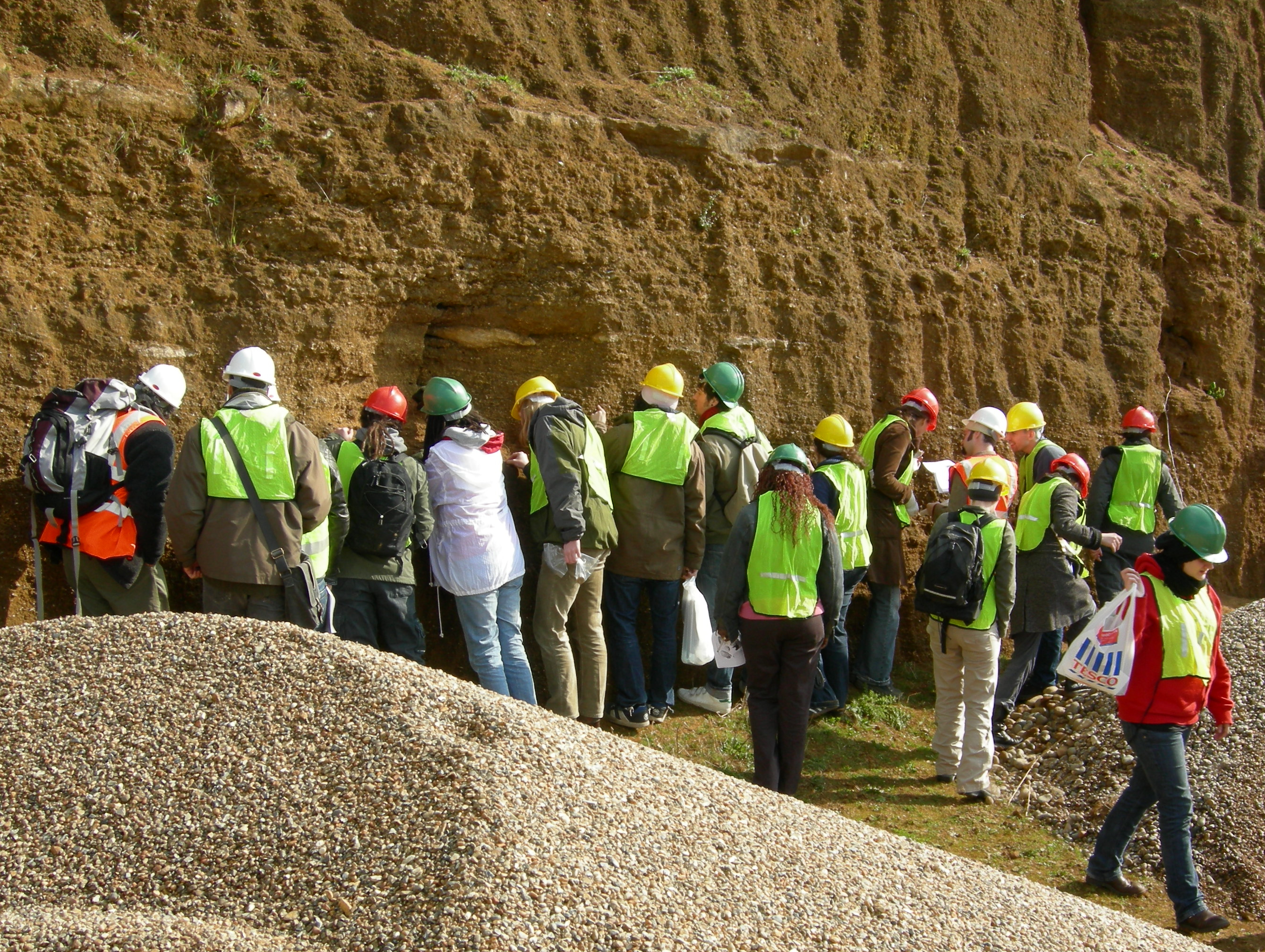
- Faringdon Sponge Gravel Member of Faringdon Sand; gravel pit SE of Faringdon, Oxfordshire.
- Type: Formation
- Unit of: Lower Greensand Group
- Sub-units: Faringdon Sponge Gravel Member, Baulking Sand Member, Fernham Sand Member
- Underlies: Unseen
- Overlies: Corallian Group
- Area: Oxfordshire
- Thickness: Variable, 50m (Faringdon Sponge Gravel Member), up to 48m (Baulking Sand Member) and at least 24m (Fernham Sand Member).

Lithology
- Primary: Sand, Gravel, Siltstone, Mudstone
- Other: Ironstone, Sandstone

Location
- Region: England
- Country: United Kingdom

Type section
- Named for: Faringdon

The Faringdon Sand is a geologic formation in England. It preserves fossils dating back to the Cretaceous period.

== See also ==
- List of fossiliferous stratigraphic units in England
