= Sandrock Formation =

Geological formation in England

- Stratigraphic range: Aptian–Albian
- Type: Geological formation
- Unit of: Lower Greensand Group
- Underlies: Monk's Bay Sandstone Formation
- Overlies: Ferruginous Sands
- Thickness: up to 70 metres (230 ft)

Lithology
- Primary: Sandstone, siltstone, mudstone

Location
- Region: Europe
- Country: United Kingdom
- Extent: Isle of Wight, Dorset
- Exposure of the Sandrock Formation on the southern half of the Isle of Wight

The Sandrock Formation is a geological formation in England, part of the Lower Greensand Group, it is found on the Isle of Wight and in the northern part of Swanage Bay. It consists of a cyclic rhythm of sandstones, siltstones, and mudstones.
