= Park Farm Cutting =

Coordinates: 50.960°N 0.522°W

- Site of Special Scientific Interest
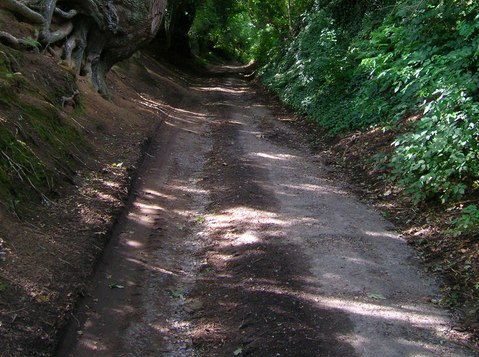
- Location of Park Farm Cutting.
- Area of search: West Sussex
- Grid reference: TQ 039 189
- Interest: Geological
- Area: 0.2 hectares (0.49 acres)
- Notification date: 1986
- Location map: Magic Map

Park Farm Cutting is a 0.2-hectare (0.49-acre) geological Site of Special Scientific Interest west of Pulborough in West Sussex. It is a Geological Conservation Review site.

This site exposes the Sandgate Beds of the Lower Greensand Group, which dates to the Early Cretaceous between 140 and 100 million years ago. It is the best collecting ground for a diverse range of mollusc fossils.

The Wey South Path goes through the site.
