= Monk's Bay Sandstone =

- Stratigraphic range: Albian
- Type: Geological formation
- Unit of: Lower Greensand Group
- Underlies: Gault Formation
- Overlies: Sandrock Formation
- Thickness: up to 21.9 metres (70 ft), 5 cm in Swanage

Lithology
- Primary: Sands

Location
- Region: England
- Country: United Kingdom
- Extent: Isle of Wight, Dorset

The Monk's Bay Sandstone, formerly known as the Carstone Formation of the Isle of Wight (or similar) is a geological formation in England, present on the Isle of Wight and marginally in Swanage. Its lithology consists of gritty, reddish-brown sands with pebbles and phosphatic nodules
