= Ferruginous Sands =

- Stratigraphic range: Early Cretaceous, ~116 Ma
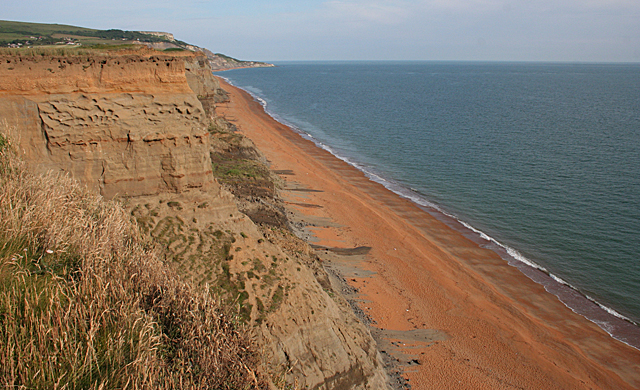
- The Ferruginous Sands at Chale Bay, Isle of Wight
- Type: Formation
- Unit of: Lower Greensand Group
- Sub-units: Member IV, Member V, Member VI, Whale Chine Member, Member VIII, Ladder Chine Member, Member X, Member XI, Old Walpen Chine Member, New Walpen Chine Member, Member XIV and Member XV.
- Underlies: Sandrock Formation
- Overlies: Atherfield Clay Formation
- Thickness: up to 161 metres

Lithology
- Primary: Weakly cemented Mudstone and Sandstone

Location
- Region: England
- Country: United Kingdom
- Extent: Isle of Wight, Dorset
- Exposure of the Ferruginous Sands on the Isle of Wight, shown in Spring green

The Ferruginous Sands is a geologic formation in England. It preserves fossils dating back to the Aptian Stage of the Cretaceous period. It consists of "a number of heavily bioturbated coarsening-upward units each comprising dark grey sandy muds or muddy sands passing up into fine-to medium-grained grey to green glauconitic sands." The dinosaur Vectaerovenator inopinatus is known from the formation. Shark teeth are also known from the formation, including those of an indeterminate lamniform shark and Palaeospinax (formerly Synechodus).

== See also ==
- List of fossiliferous stratigraphic units in England
