= Marehill Quarry =

Coordinates: 50.957°N 0.486°W

- Site of Special Scientific Interest
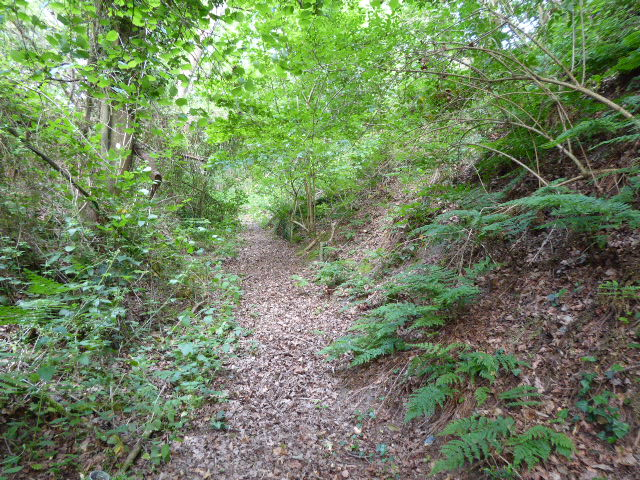
- Location of Marehill Quarry.
- Area of search: West Sussex
- Grid reference: TQ 064 186
- Interest: Geological
- Area: 1.1 hectares (2.7 acres)
- Notification date: 1987
- Location map: Magic Map

Marehill Quarry is a 1.1-hectare (2.7-acre) geological Site of Special Scientific Interest east of Pulborough in West Sussex. It is owned and managed by the Sussex Wildlife Trust and is a Geological Conservation Review site.

This disused quarry is the type locality for the Marehill Clay, a member of the Sandgate Beds, part of the Lower Greensand Group, which dates to the Lower Cretaceous between 145 and 100 million years ago. It has caves which are used for hibernation by several species of bats, including Natterer's, whiskered and Daubenton's.

There is no public access to the site.
