= Slinfold Stream and Quarry =

Site of Special Scientific Interest

Coordinates: 51.073°N 0.396°W

- Site of Special Scientific Interest
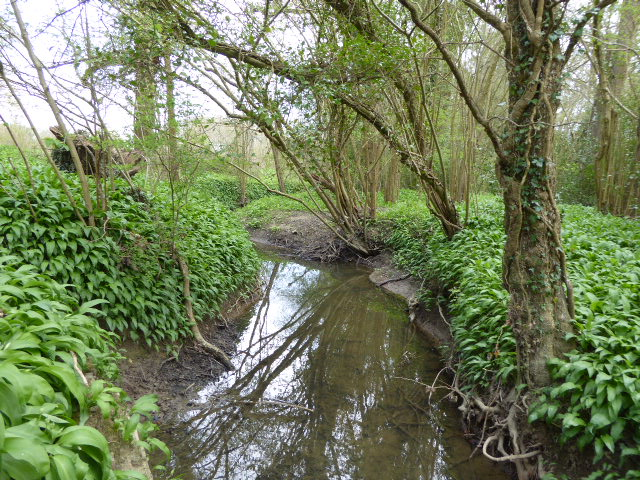
- Slinfold Stream
- Location of Slinfold Stream and Quarry.
- Area of search: West Sussex
- Grid reference: TQ 125 316
- Interest: Geological
- Area: 2.3 hectares (5.7 acres)
- Notification date: 1990
- Location map: Magic Map

Slinfold Stream and Quarry is a 2.3-hectare (5.7-acre) geological Site of Special Scientific Interest west of Horsham in West Sussex. It is a Geological Conservation Review site.

This site exposes the Horsham Stone member of the Lower Weald Clay, dating to the Early Cretaceous, around 130 million years ago. It preserves the fossils of horsetails in their upright position, suggesting that they grew in a fresh water reedswamp with a maximum depth of 2 metres (2.2 yards).

A public footpath goes through a small stretch of the stream bank but the rest of the site is private land with no public access.
