= Philpot's and Hook Quarries =

Protected area in West Sussex, England

Coordinates: 51.070°N 0.068°W

- Site of Special Scientific Interest
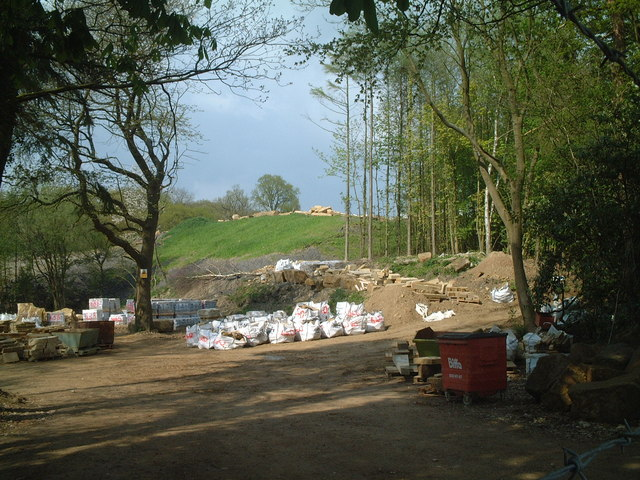
- Entrance to Philpot's Quarry
- Location of Philpot's and Hook Quarries.
- Area of search: West Sussex
- Grid reference: TQ 355 319
- Interest: Geological
- Area: 2.6 hectares (6.4 acres)
- Notification date: 1992
- Location map: Magic Map

Philpots and Hook Quarries make up a 2.6 hectare (6.4 acre) geological Site of Special Scientific interest covering two sites in West Sussex, Lambs Philpots Quarry, southwest of the village of West Hoathly, and Hook Quarry, lying 1 kilometre (0.6 mile) to the south. The quarries are listed as a geological Site of Special Scientific Interest, on private land with no public access. The sites a Geological Conservation Review site.

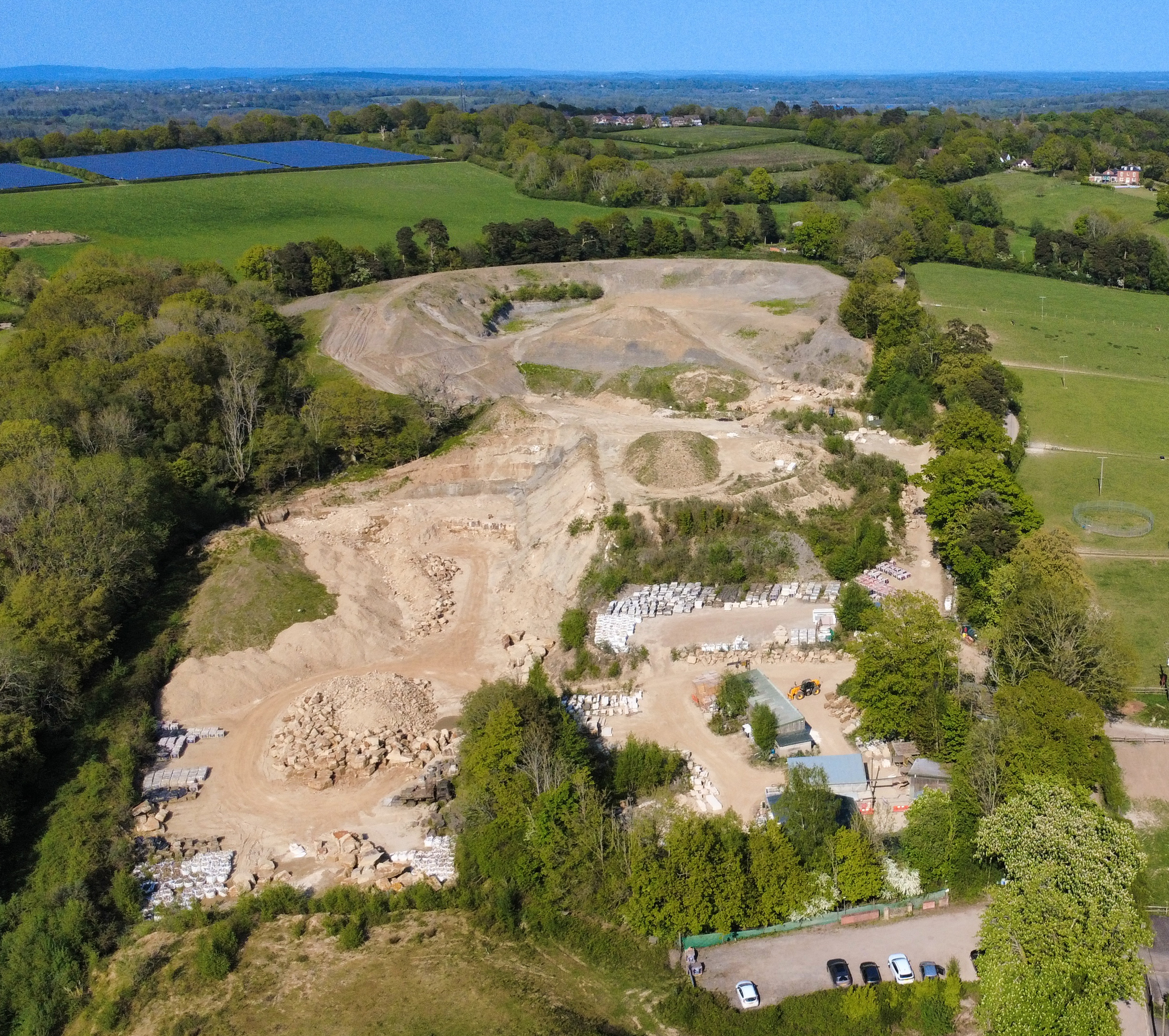
Lambs Philpots Quarry in 2026, looking approximately northeast. Ardingly sandstone is exposed within the nearest third and the Cuckfield bed in the central and distant thirds.

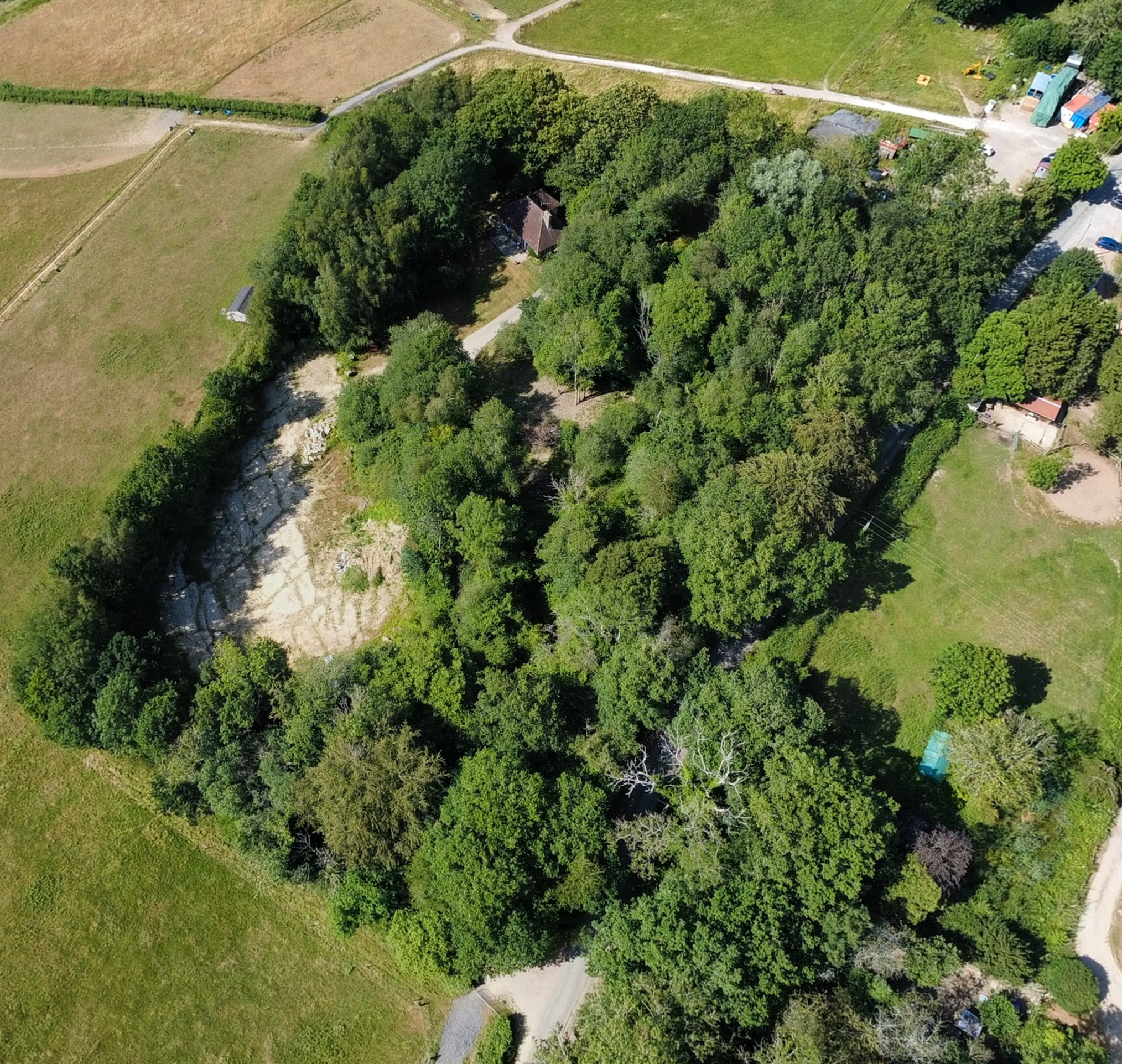
Hook Quarry, West Sussex, looking approximately north, The site is contained within the central sub-rectangle; the quarry is now mostly disused and largely overgrown. An earlier quarry site is within the wooded area at the base of the picture on the right side of the road.

== History ==
Philpots Quarry has been in operation for over 125 years. Brick and stone merchants Lambs secured the rights to excavate at Philpots Quarry in 2004 and purchased the site in 2011; it remains active as Lambs Philpots Quarry.

On the Hook Farm estate to the south, quarrying occurred both sides of Hook Lane and sandstone was hewn there for 200 years or more around Hook Farmhouse itself, a listed building dating from the 17th century or earlier. Later, the quarry was - and remains - only intermittently used to source stone, and is now largely overgrown with a separate private dwelling on-site.

== Geology ==
Both quarries expose the Ardingly Sandstone Member in the Tunbridge Wells Sand Formation, part of the Wealden Group, dating to the Lower Cretaceous period between 133.9 and 139.4 million years ago. At Hook Quarry, elevations are between 140 and 153 metres. At Philpots Quarry, the Cuckfield Stone Bed, sandstone from the same period, is additionally exposed. Elevations at Philpots Quarry are between 145 and 172 metres; this quarry has been the source of many dinosaur fossils and both quarries have debris dating to the Precambrian. The sandstone in both quarries is topped in some areas with Lower Grinstead Clay-Mudstone.
