= Coppedhall Hanger =

Coordinates: 51.038°N 0.464°W

- Site of Special Scientific Interest
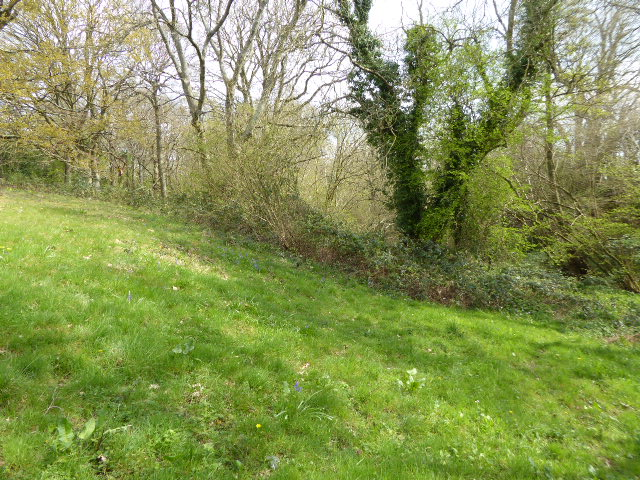
- Location of Coppedhall Hanger.
- Area of search: West Sussex
- Grid reference: TQ 078 276
- Interest: Geological
- Area: 0.6 hectares (1.5 acres)
- Notification date: 1992
- Location map: Magic Map

Coppedhall Hanger is a 0.6-hectare (1.5-acre) geological Site of Special Scientific Interest north of Billingshurst in West Sussex. It is a Geological Conservation Review site.

A stream runs through this site and it exposes a layer of sand, silt and jet from the Lower Weald Clay around 130 million years ago. The sand contains fragments of detritus dating to the 280 million year old Cornubian batholith.

This site is a steeply sloping area of grassland, scrub and woodland. There is access from a public footpath which runs close to the southern end.
