= Folkestone Formation =

UK geological formation

- Stratigraphic range: Albian 110 Ma
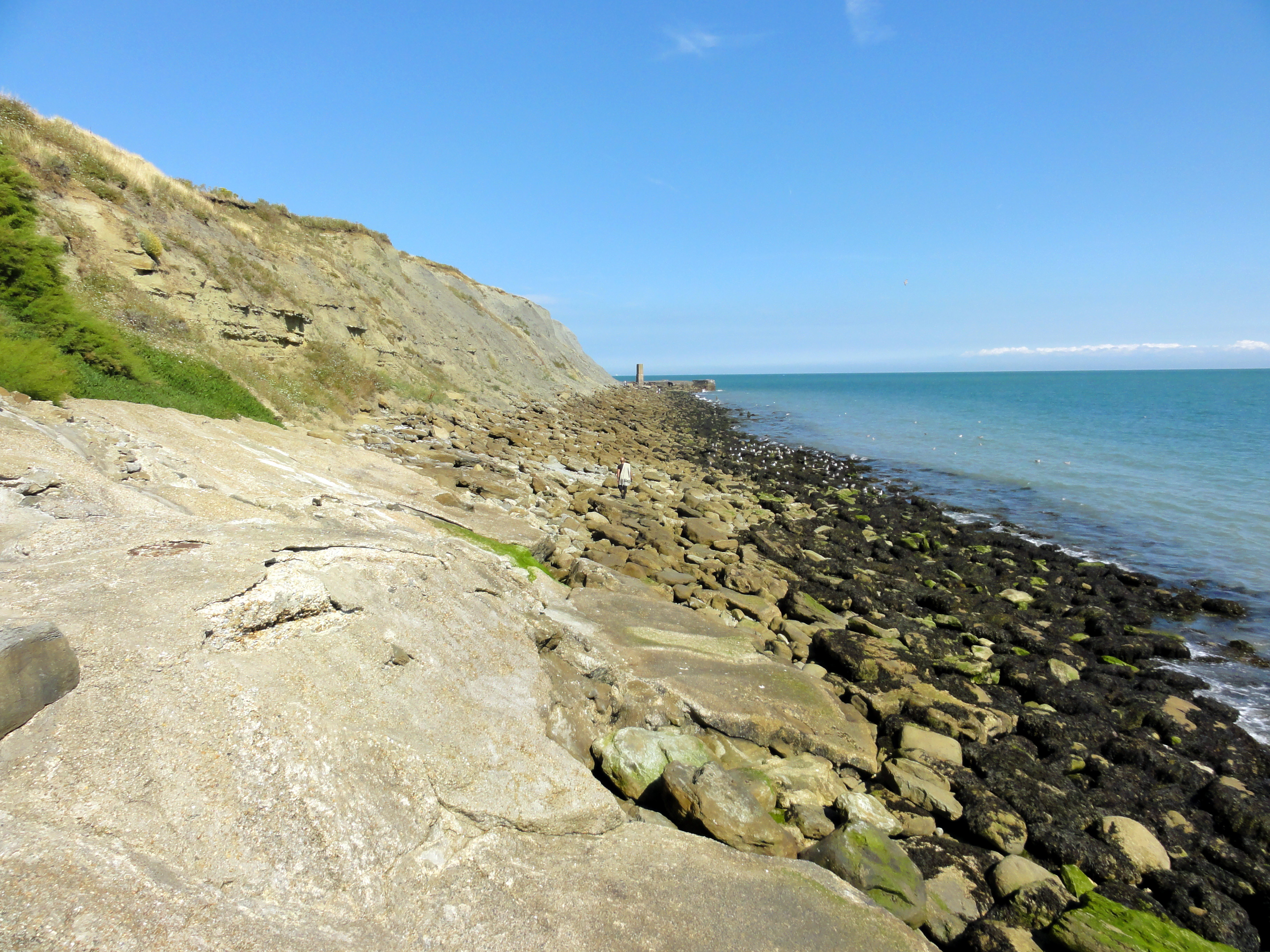
- Cliffs at Folkestone
- Type: Geological formation
- Unit of: Lower Greensand Group
- Underlies: Gault Formation
- Overlies: Sandgate Formation
- Area: Weald Basin
- Thickness: Between 0.5 and 80m.

Lithology
- Primary: Sand, Sandstone

Location
- Region: Europe
- Country: United Kingdom
- Extent: Southern England

Type section
- Named for: Folkestone
- Location: East Cliff, Folkestone

The Folkestone Formation is a geological formation in the United Kingdom. It forms part of the Lower Greensand Group, and dates to the early part of the Albian stage of the Early Cretaceous. It primarily consists of medium to coarsed grained unconsolidated sand and weakly cemented sandstone. It was likely deposited in a shallow beach setting. Dinosaur tracks have been reported from the formation, including those of theropods, ornithopods, and possibly ankylosaurs.
