= Southerham Works Pit =

Coordinates: 50.868°N 0.025°E

- Site of Special Scientific Interest
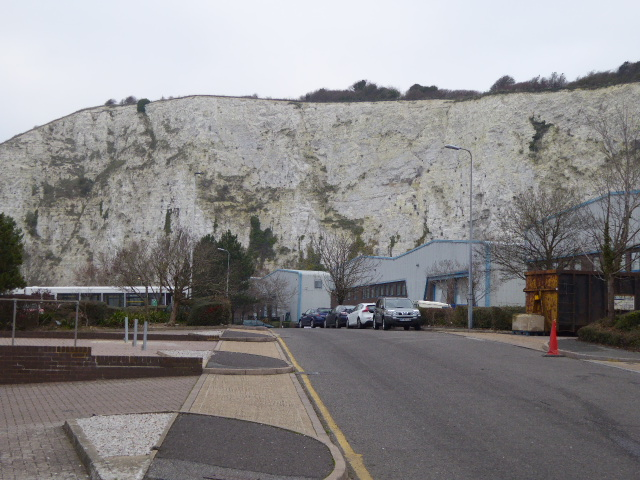
- Location of Southerham Works Pit.
- Area of search: East Sussex
- Grid reference: TQ 426 096
- Interest: Geological
- Area: 1.0 hectare (2.5 acres)
- Notification date: 1996
- Location map: Magic Map

Southerham Works Pit is a 1-hectare (2.5-acre) geological Site of Special Scientific Interest in Lewes in East Sussex. It is a Geological Conservation Review site.

This site exposes layers of the Chalk Group dating to the Upper Cretaceous between 90 and 87 million years ago. It is a key site for understanding the lithostratigraphy of the period and the environments of its chalk sea as well as the evolution and taxonomy of Upper Cretaceous fish.

There is access to the southern end of the site from Southerham Lane.
