= Southerham Machine Bottom Pit =

Coordinates: 50.863°N 0.033°E

- Site of Special Scientific Interest
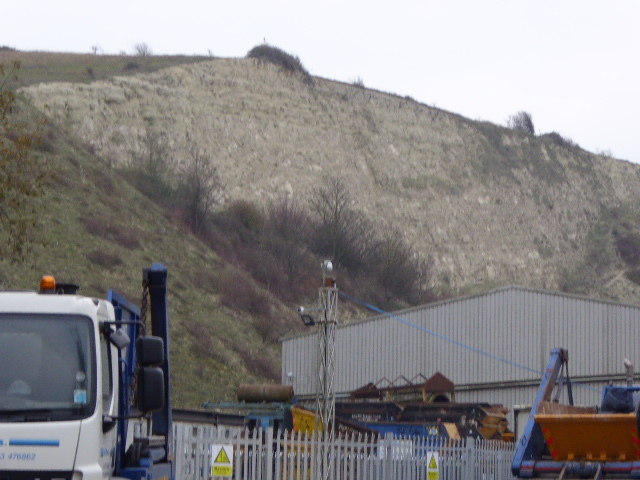
- Location of Southerham Machine Bottom Pit.
- Area of search: East Sussex
- Grid reference: TQ 432 090
- Interest: Geological
- Area: 1.8 hectares (4.4 acres)
- Notification date: 1999
- Location map: Magic Map

Southerham Machine Bottom Pit is a 1.8-hectare (4.4-acre) geological Site of Special Scientific Interest in Lewes in the East Sussex. It is a Geological Conservation Review site.

This site is historically significant for the number and quality of fossils of Cretaceous fish found by nineteenth century scholars such as Gideon Mantell. These fossils are particularly important for helping to understand the early evolution of fish groups such as the teleosts.

The site is private land with no public access.
