= Freshfield Lane =

Geological site in West Sussex, UK

Coordinates: 51.021°N 0.028°W

- Site of Special Scientific Interest
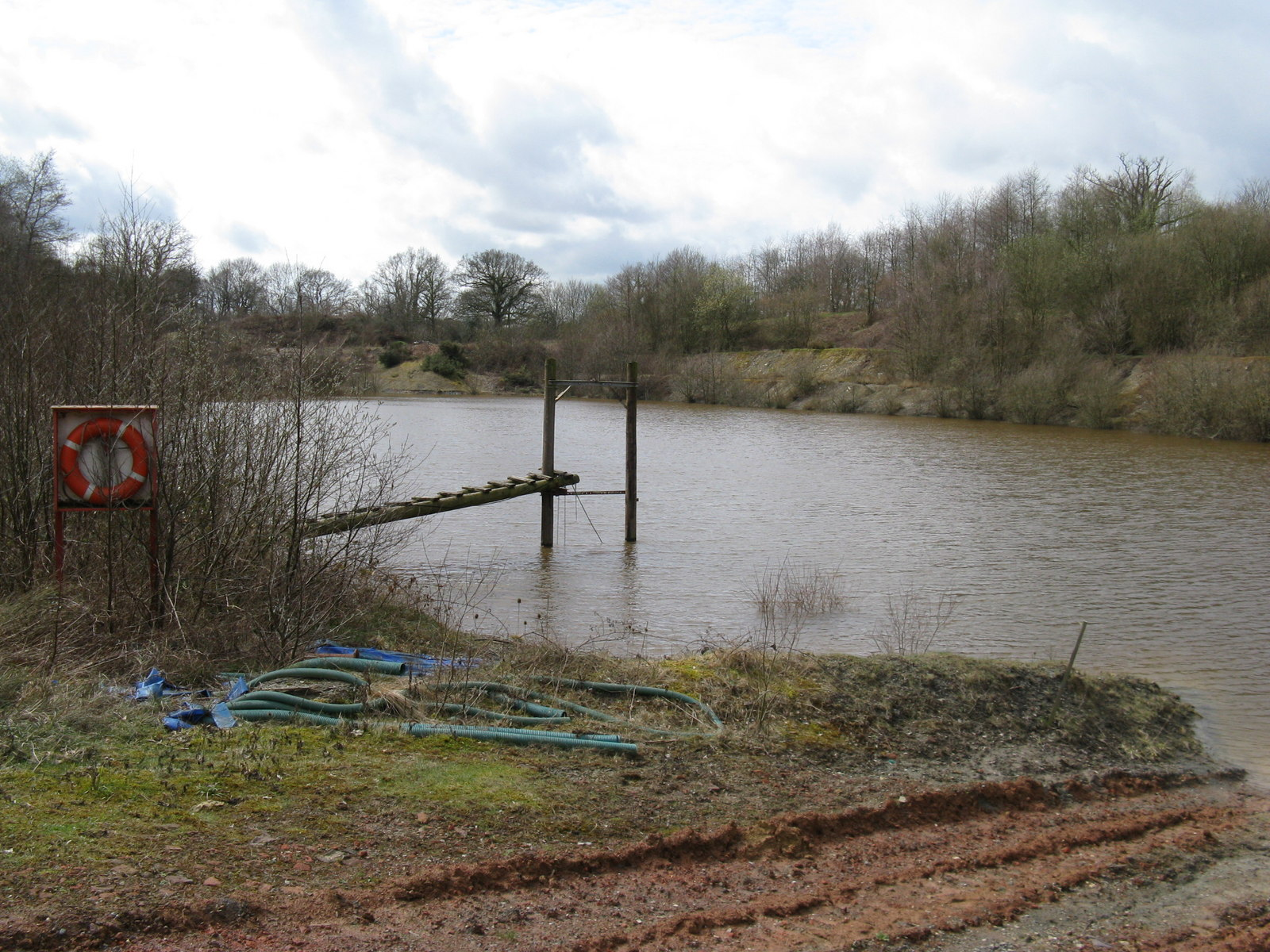
- Location of Freshfield Lane.
- Area of search: West Sussex
- Grid reference: TQ 384 265
- Interest: Geological
- Area: 17.0 hectares (42 acres)
- Notification date: 1999
- Location map: Magic Map

Freshfield Lane is a 17-hectare (42-acre) geological Site of Special Scientific Interest east of Haywards Heath in West Sussex. It is a Geological Conservation Review site.

This working quarry exposes rocks dating to formations in the Wealden Group of Lower Cretaceous age, around 140 to 113 million years ago. It is described by Natural England as "internationally important for palaeoenvironmental, provenance and palaeogeographical studies".

There are footpaths around the boundaries of the two areas in the site.
