= Coneyhurst Cutting =

Coordinates: 51.009°N 0.433°W

- Site of Special Scientific Interest
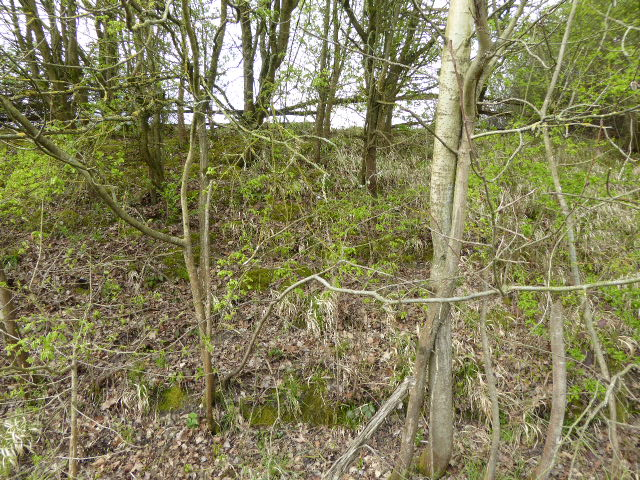
- Location of Coneyhurst Cutting.
- Area of search: West Sussex
- Grid reference: TQ 100 244
- Interest: Geological
- Area: 0.2 hectares (0.49 acres)
- Notification date: 1992
- Location map: Magic Map

Coneyhurst Cutting is a 0.2-hectare (0.49-acre) geological Site of Special Scientific Interest south-east of Billingshurst in West Sussex. It is a Geological Conservation Review site.

This road cutting exposes a 0.43-metre (0.47-yard) thick layer of limestone dating to the Lower Weald Clay of the Early Cretaceous around 130 million years ago. The layer contains the fossils of large Viviparus (freshwater river snails) preserved in three dimensions.

The site is a road verge which is covered with scrub and trees and no geology is visible.
