= Chantry Mill =

UK Site of Special Scientific Interest

Coordinates: 50.913°N 0.445°W

- Site of Special Scientific Interest
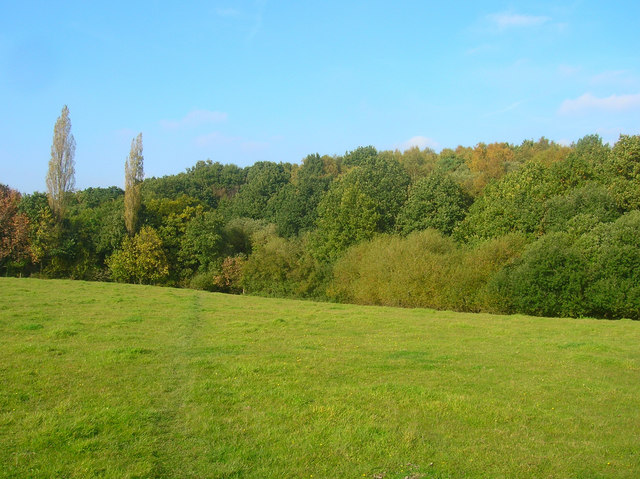
- Location of Chantry Mill.
- Area of search: West Sussex
- Grid reference: TQ 094 138
- Interest: Geological
- Area: 8.7 hectares (21 acres)
- Notification date: 1987
- Location map: Magic Map

Chantry Mill is a 8.7-hectare (21-acre) geological Site of Special Scientific Interest in Storrington in West Sussex. It is a Geological Conservation Review site.

This site provides the best exposure of the junction between the Gault and Folkestone Beds of the Wealden Group, dating to around 140 million years ago in the Early Cretaceous.

A public footpath runs along the south-western edge of the site.
