= Atherfield Clay Formation =

Geological formation in southern England

- Stratigraphic range: Aptian
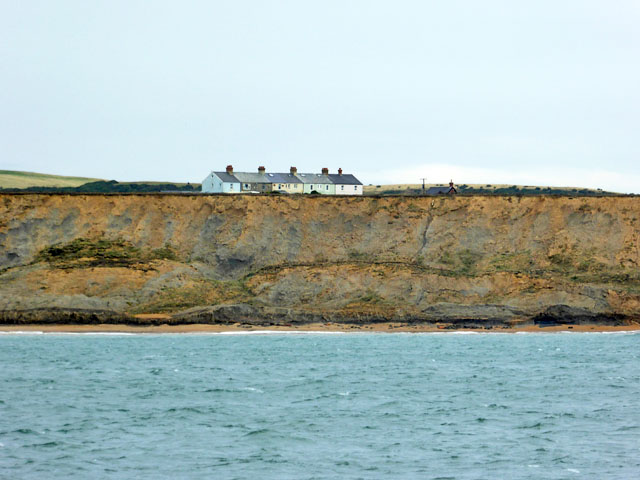
- Atherfield Point
- Type: Geological formation
- Unit of: Lower Greensand Group
- Sub-units: Chale Clay Member
- Underlies: Ferruginous Sands, Hythe Formation
- Overlies: Vectis Formation, Weald Clay
- Thickness: 55–60 m (180–197 ft) on the Isle of Wight, up to 18 m (59 ft) in the Weald

Lithology
- Primary: Mudstone
- Other: Sandstone, Ironstone

Location
- Region: Europe
- Country: United Kingdom
- Extent: Southern England

The Atherfield Clay Formation is a geological formation in Southern England. Part of the Lower Greensand Group it dates to the Aptian age of the Early Cretaceous. The deposit is of marine origin largely consisting of massive yellowish brown to pale grey mudstones. The pterosaur Vectidraco is known from the formation. As is the Sandownid turtle Sandownia.
