= Lower Greensand Group =

Geological unit

- Stratigraphic range: Aptian – Early Albian 125–110 Ma
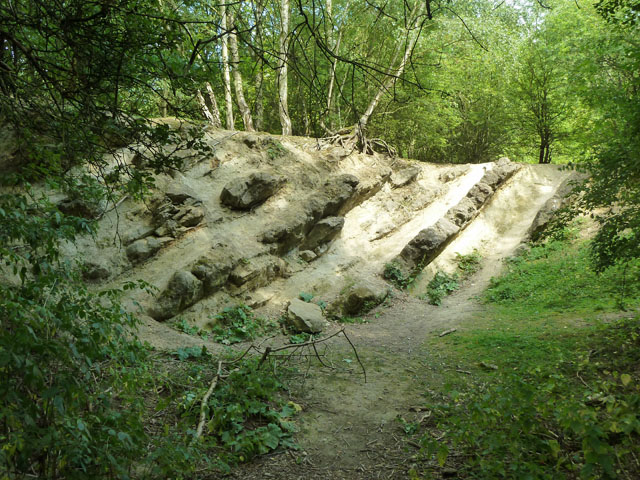
- Lower Greensand outcrop near Dryhill
- Type: Stratigraphic group
- Sub-units: Wessex Basin: Atherfield Clay Formation, Ferruginous Sands, Sandrock Formation, Monk's Bay Sandstone Formation; Weald Basin: Atherfield Clay Formation, Hythe Formation, Sandgate Formation, Folkestone Formation; Marginal: Woburn Sands Formation, Faringdon Sand, Seend Ironstone Formation, Calne Sands Formation
- Underlies: Selborne Group
- Overlies: In Southern England, Wealden Group, elsewhere Jurassic rocks
- Thickness: ~250 m in South Western Weald

Lithology
- Primary: Sandstone
- Other: Siltstone, Clay

Location
- Region: England
- Country: United Kingdom

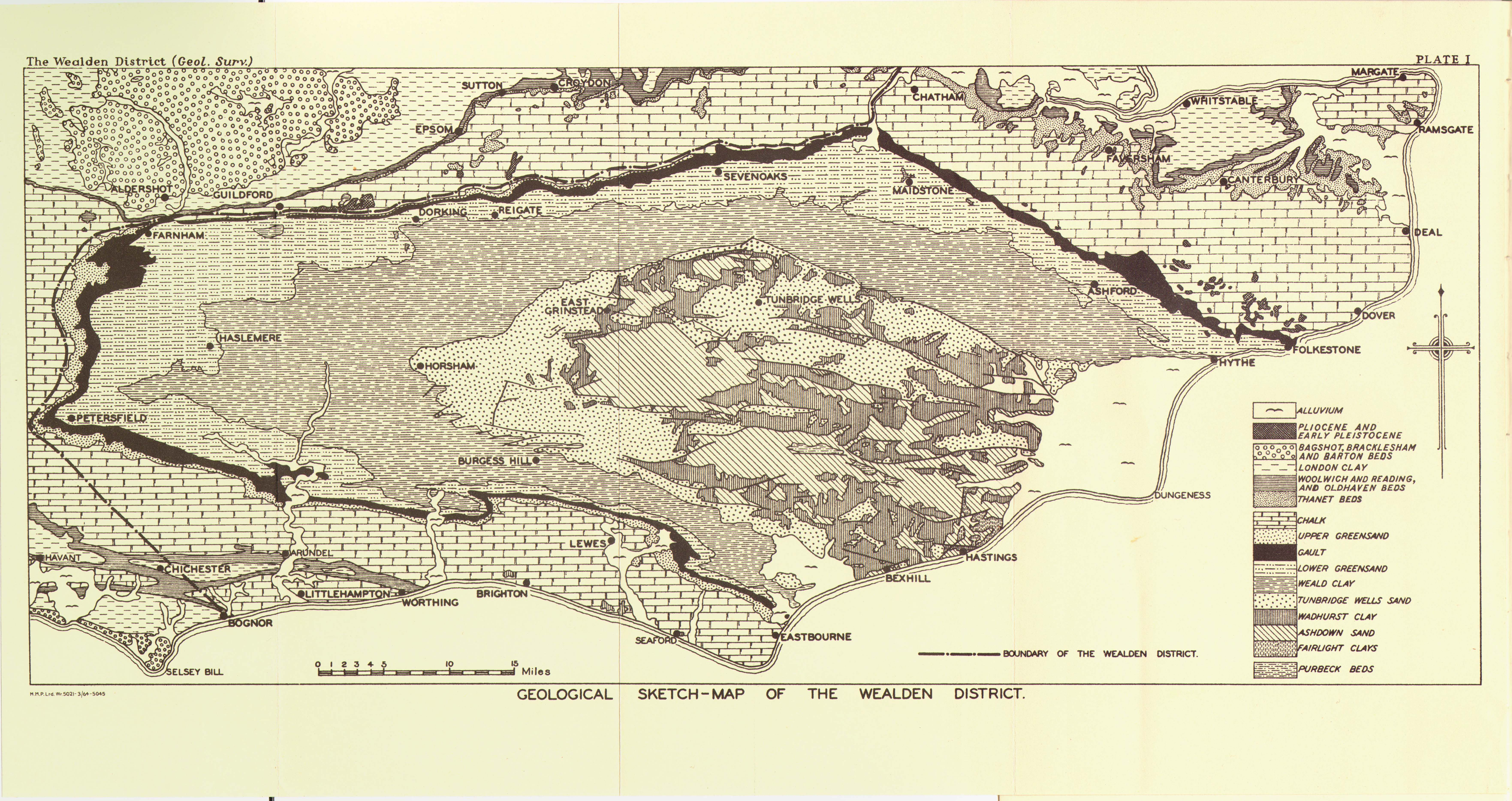
The Lower Greensand as a broad zone between the brick-patterned chalk (a type of limestone) and the interior large c-shape Weald Clay. Many towns shown are on the Lower Greensand.

The Lower Greensand Group is a geological unit present across large areas of Southern England. It was deposited during the Aptian and Albian ages of the Early Cretaceous. It predominantly consists of sandstone and unconsolidated sand that were deposited in shallow marine conditions.

== Lithology ==
The Lower Greensand typically comprises loose, unconsolidated sandstone (termed rubblestone/rubble in construction) and sands of varying grain size with subordinate amounts of siltstones, mudstones (containing smectites and similar) and limestones. The name "greensand" is derived from the presence of the green coloured mineral glauconite, which forms in shallow marine conditions.

In the Weald of East Sussex the lowermost part of the group is recognised by green glauconitic clays with a basal bed of phosphate nodules. These clays are overlain by green sandy clays and silts and finally homogeneous fine grained sands. The sediments are noted to become increasingly fine grained and glauconitic to the east.

== Stratigraphy ==
The Lower Greensand Group was deposited during the latter part of the Early Cretaceous Period, during the Aptian to Early Albian stages. The Group is the lowermost of two geological units that take their name from their colouration due to the presence of the mineral glauconite, the other being the Upper Greensand Formation. The unit was deposited in shallow marine conditions. In southern England the unit sharply but continuously overlies rocks of the Wealden Group. While elsewhere as the sea level rose it covered previously emergent highs of Jurassic rocks, unconformably overlying them.

In the Weald Basin, the Lower Greensand can usually be subdivided to formational levels with varying properties into, in ascending order, the Atherfield Clay Formation, the Hythe Formation, the Sandgate Formation, and the Folkestone Formation. North and west of London – including Cambridgeshire, Bedfordshire and Buckinghamshire – it is referred to as the Woburn Sands Formation. In Oxfordshire it is known as the Faringdon Sand. In North Wiltshire as the Calne Sands Formation and in parts of Wiltshire, Oxfordshire and Buckinghamshire as the Seend Ironstone Formation.

== Engineering geology ==
The Lower Greensand is one of the most landslide-susceptible formations in the UK with at least 288 known occurrences in South-East England recorded to the year 2000. Of the formations within the Lower Greensand, the Atherfield Clay is the most prone to landslip. Landslides are occasional, rapid movements of a mass of earth or rock sliding along a steep slope. They tend to occur after sustained heavy rain, when the water saturates overlying rock, making it heavy and liable to slide, others occur via soil creep is a very slow movement, occurring on very gentle slopes because of the way soils repeatedly expand and contract in wet and dry periods. When the soil dries out, it contracts vertically, assisting the soil slowly down a slope.

A common geomorphological, chiefly dependent on the local hydrology such as hydraulic action, at the base of the Lower Greensand is an escarpment, where the Hythe Beds overlie the Atherfield and Weald Clays, which is particularly susceptible to landslide. Most slip is attributed to massive sandstones overlying weaker shales and clays. The back part of the slip in strongly permeable locations is prone to be straight downward on a rotational slip plane. This shift leaves a steep back face, or back-scar, with a toe raised significantly less.

At ‘The Roughs’ in Kent, where a rotational slump occurred, slips of the Atherfield Clay (and all material above) have compromised sandstone blocks of Hythe Beds. Later translational slides have developed along a shear zone at the boundary between the slip material and the undisturbed underlying Weald Clay. This sort of rotational slip occurs regularly along the coastline between Hythe and Folkestone, where the drainage basin faces inland, exerting a steady force, where the water is subterranean, outward towards the coastal cliffs.

== See also ==
- Ashdown Formation
- Geology of East Sussex
- Geology of Kent
- Greensand Ridge
- Greensand
- Hastings Beds
- Geology of Surrey
- Wadhurst Clay Formation
- Geology of West Sussex
