= Far future =

The following articles deal with the far future:

- Future of Earth
  - Amasia (supercontinent)
  - Aurica (supercontinent)
  - Novopangea
  - Pangea Ultima
- Future of the solar system
- Future of an expanding universe
- Ultimate fate of the universe
  - Big Crunch
  - Big Rip
  - Heat death of the universe

== Timelines ==
- Timeline of the far future

== In culture ==
- Far future in religion
- Far future in fiction

== See also ==
- Future
- Longtermism
- Year 10,000 problem
- Andromeda–Milky Way collision
- Chronology of the universe
- Timeline of Earth
