= Afro-Eurasia =

Landmass consisting of Africa, Asia, and Europe

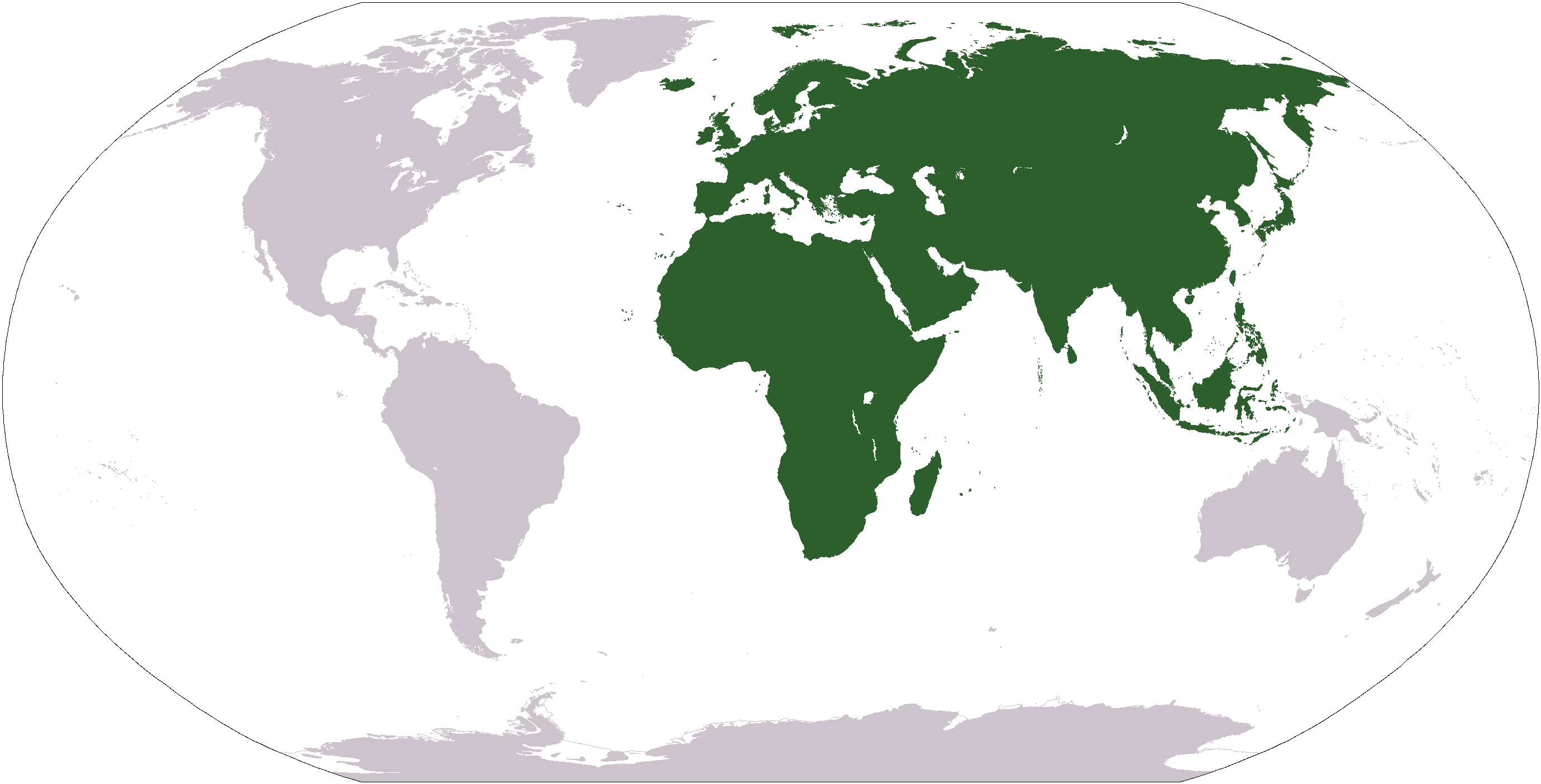
- Area: 85,135,000 km^{2} (32,871,000 sq mi)
- Population: 6.7 billion (2019)
- Population density: 78.7/km^{2} (204.2/sq mi)
- Demonym: Afro-Eurasian, Afroeurasian, Eurafrasian
- Countries: 146 countries 8 de facto states
- Dependencies: 11 dependencies 5 territories
- Time zone: UTC−01:00 – UTC+12:00
- Part of: Earth

Afro-Eurasia (also known as Afroeurasia, and Eurafrasia) is a landmass, occasionally described as a supercontinent, comprising the continents of Africa, Asia, and Europe. The terms are compound words of the names of its constituent parts. Afro-Eurasia has also been called the "Old World", in contrast to the "New World" referring to the Americas plus sometimes Oceania and Antarctica.

Afro-Eurasia encompasses 85,135,000 km^{2} (32,871,000 sq mi), 57% of the world's land area, and has a population of approximately 6.7 billion people, roughly 86% of the world population. Together with mainland Australia, they comprise the vast majority of the land in the world's Eastern Hemisphere. The Afro-Eurasian mainland is the largest and most populous contiguous landmass on Earth.

== Related terms ==
The following terms are used for similar concepts:

- Ecumene: a term from classical antiquity for the world as was known to ancient Greek scholars, which was limited to Europe, North Africa, and West Asia.
- Old World: a term from the Age of Discovery which, for European explorers, contrasted their previously known world from the New World of the Americas; still widely used in biology.
- World Island: a term coined by H.J. Mackinder in his "The Geographical Pivot of History" (1904) and used in geopolitical contexts. Mackinder defines the World Island as the large contiguous landmass, technically excluding islands such as the British Isles, the Japanese archipelago, Madagascar, and the Malay Archipelago. "Afro-Eurasia" generally includes those islands usually considered parts of Africa, Asia, and Europe.

== Geology ==
Although Afro-Eurasia is typically considered to comprise two or three separate continents, it is not a proper supercontinent. Instead, it is the largest present part of the supercontinent cycle.

=== Past ===
The oldest part of Afro-Eurasia is probably the Kaapvaal craton, which together with Madagascar and parts of the Indian subcontinent and western Australian continent formed part of the first supercontinent Vaalbara or Ur around 3 billion years ago. It has made up parts of every supercontinent since. At the breakup of Pangaea around 200 million years ago, the North American and Eurasian plates together formed Laurasia while the African plate remained in Gondwana, from which the Indian plate split off. Upon impact with the Eurasian plate, the Indian plate created southern Asia around 50 million years ago and began the formation of the Himalayas. Around the same time, the Indian plate also fused with the Australian plate.

The Arabian plate broke off of Africa around 30 million years ago and impacted the Iranian plate between 19 and 12 million years ago during the Miocene, ultimately forming the Alborz and Zagros chains of Iranian plate. After this initial connection of Afro-Eurasia, the Betic corridor along the Gibraltar Arc closed a little less than 6 million years ago in the Messinian, fusing northwest Africa and Iberia together. This led to the nearly complete desiccation of the Mediterranean Basin, the Messinian salinity crisis. Eurasia and Africa were then again separated with the Zanclean Flood around 5.33 million years ago refilling the Mediterranean Sea through the Strait of Gibraltar.

=== Present ===
Today, the Eurasian plate and African plate dominate their respective continents. However, the Somali plate covers much of East Africa, creating the East African Rift. In the eastern Mediterranean, the Aegean Sea plate, Anatolian plate and Arabian plate also form a boundary with the African plate, which incorporates the Sinai Peninsula, Gulf of Aqaba, and the coastal Levant via the Dead Sea transform. Eurasia also includes the Indian plate, Burma plate, Sunda plate, Yangtze plate, Amur plate and Okhotsk plate, with the North American plate incorporating the Chukotka Autonomous Okrug in the Russian Far East.

Conventionally, Africa is joined to Eurasia only by a relatively narrow land bridge (which has been split by the Suez Canal at the Isthmus of Suez) and remains separated from Europe by the straits of Gibraltar and Sicily.

=== Future ===
Paleogeologist Ronald Blakey has described the next 15 to 100 million years of tectonic development as fairly settled and predictable. In that time, Africa is expected to continue drifting northward. It will close the Strait of Gibraltar, quickly evaporating the Mediterranean Sea. No supercontinent will form within the settled time frame, however, and the geologic record is full of unexpected shifts in tectonic activity that make further projections "very, very speculative". Three possibilities are known as Novopangaea, Amasia, and Pangaea Proxima. In the first two, the Pacific closes and Africa remains fused to Eurasia, but Eurasia itself splits as Africa and Europe spin towards the west; in the last, the trio spin eastward together as the Atlantic closes, creating land borders with the Americas.

== Extreme points ==
This is a list of the points that are farther north, south, east or west than any other location as well as the highest and lowest elevations on Afro-Eurasia.

=== Mainland ===
- Easternmost point
  - By longitude – 180th meridian, Russia
  - On a continuous eastbound path – Cape Dezhnev, Russia
- Northernmost point – Cape Chelyuskin, Russia
- Southernmost point – Cape Agulhas, South Africa
- Westernmost point
  - By longitude – 180th meridian, Russia
  - On a continuous westbound path – Pointe des Almadies, Senegal

=== Including islands ===
- Easternmost point – Big Diomede^{†}, Russia (169° 03'W)
- Northernmost point – Cape Fligeli, Rudolf Island, Franz Josef Land, Russia (81° 48′ N)
- Southernmost point – Cape Agulhas, South Africa (34° 51'S). If remote islands such as the Prince Edward Islands are included in Africa, then Marion Island is the southernmost point at 46° 54'S.
- Westernmost point – Santo Antão, Cape Verde (25° 25'W). If remote islands are included, then it would be Monchique Islet, Azores Islands, Portugal (31° 16′ W)

^{†} The 180th meridian passes through Asia, so this point is in the Western Hemisphere and is Asia’s easternmost point on a continuous path.

=== Elevation ===
- Highest point – Mount Everest, China–Nepal border; 8,848.86 m (29,031.7 ft) above mean sea level
- Lowest point on land – shores of the Dead Sea, between Israel, West Bank and Jordan; 430.5 m (1,412 ft) below mean sea level

== See also ==
- Extreme points of Earth
- Extreme points of Africa
- Extreme points of Eurasia
  - Extreme points of Asia
  - Extreme points of Europe
- Geography of Africa
- Geography of Asia
- Geography of Europe
- Indo-Mediterranean, argued to be central within Afro-Eurasia until 1000 AD
- Intermediate Region
- The Geographical Pivot of History

=== Subregional groupings ===
- Afro-Asia
- Eurasia
- Eurafrica
