= Galactic year =

Unit of time

Approximate orbit of the Sun (yellow circle) around the Galactic Center

The galactic year, also known as a cosmic year, is the duration of time required for the Sun to orbit once around the center of the Milky Way Galaxy. One galactic year is approximately 225 million Earth years. The Solar System is traveling at an average speed of 230 km/s (828,000 km/h) or 143 mi/s (514,000 mph) within its trajectory around the Galactic Center, a speed at which an object could circumnavigate the Earth's equator in 2 minutes and 54 seconds; that speed corresponds to approximately 1/1300 of the speed of light.

The galactic year provides a convenient medial unit for depicting cosmic and geological time periods together. By contrast, a "billion-year" scale does not allow for useful discrimination between geologic events, and a "million-year" scale requires some rather large numbers.

== Timeline of the universe and Earth's history in galactic years ==
The following list assumes that one galactic year is 225 million years.

Time		Event
Galactic years (gal) (approx.)	Millions of years (Ma) (approx.)	Event
Past (years ago)
61 gal	13725 Ma (13.7 Ga)	Big Bang
60 gal	13500 Ma (13.5 Ga)	Birth of the Milky Way
49 gal	11025 Ma (11 Ga)	A hypothesized merge of Milky Way with Kraken galaxy
20 gal	4500 Ma	Birth of the Sun and Earth
17–18 gal	3825–4050 Ma	Oceans appear on Earth
17 gal	3825 Ma	Life begins on Earth
16 gal	3600 Ma	Prokaryotes appear
12 gal	2700 Ma	Bacteria appear
11 gal	2475 Ma	The Great Oxidation Event commences
10 gal	2250 Ma	Eukaryian period first appearance of eukaryotes Stable continents appear
7 gal	1575 Ma	Multicellular organisms appear
5 gal	1125 Ma	Meiosis and sexual reproduction appear
4 gal	900 Ma	First multicellular terrestrial plants
3 gal	675 Ma	Possible early animals (Animalia)
2 gal	540 Ma	Cambrian explosion occurs
2 gal	500 Ma	The first brain structure appears in worms
1 gal	225 Ma	Permian–Triassic extinction event
0.3 gal	68 Ma	Cretaceous–Paleogene extinction event
0.001 gal	0.23 Ma	Emergence of anatomically modern humans
Future (years from now)
0.15 gal	34 Ma	Mean time between impacts of asteroidal bodies in the order of magnitude of the K/Pg impactor has elapsed.
1 gal	225 Ma	All the continents on Earth may fuse into a supercontinent. Four potential arrangements of this configuration have been dubbed Amasia, Novopangaea, Aurica and Pangaea Proxima.
2–3 gal	450–675 Ma	Tidal acceleration moves the Moon far enough from Earth that total solar eclipses are no longer possible
4 gal	900 Ma	Carbon dioxide levels fall to the point at which C4 photosynthesis is no longer possible. Multicellular life dies out
15 gal	3375 Ma	Surface conditions on Earth are comparable to those on Venus today
22 gal	4950 Ma	The Milky Way and Andromeda Galaxy begin to collide
25 gal	5625 Ma	Sun ejects a planetary nebula, leaving behind a white dwarf
30 gal	6750 Ma	The Milky Way and Andromeda complete their merger into a giant elliptical galaxy called Milkomeda or Milkdromeda
500 gal	112500 Ma (112.5 Ga)	The Universe's expansion causes all galaxies beyond the Milky Way's Local Group to disappear beyond the cosmic event horizon, removing them from the reachable universe
2000 gal	450000 Ma (450 Ga)	Local Group of 47 galaxies coalesces into a single large galaxy

Visualization of the orbit of the Sun (yellow dot and white curve) around the Galactic Center (GC) in the last galactic year. The red dots correspond to the positions of the stars studied by the European Southern Observatory in a monitoring program.

== See also ==
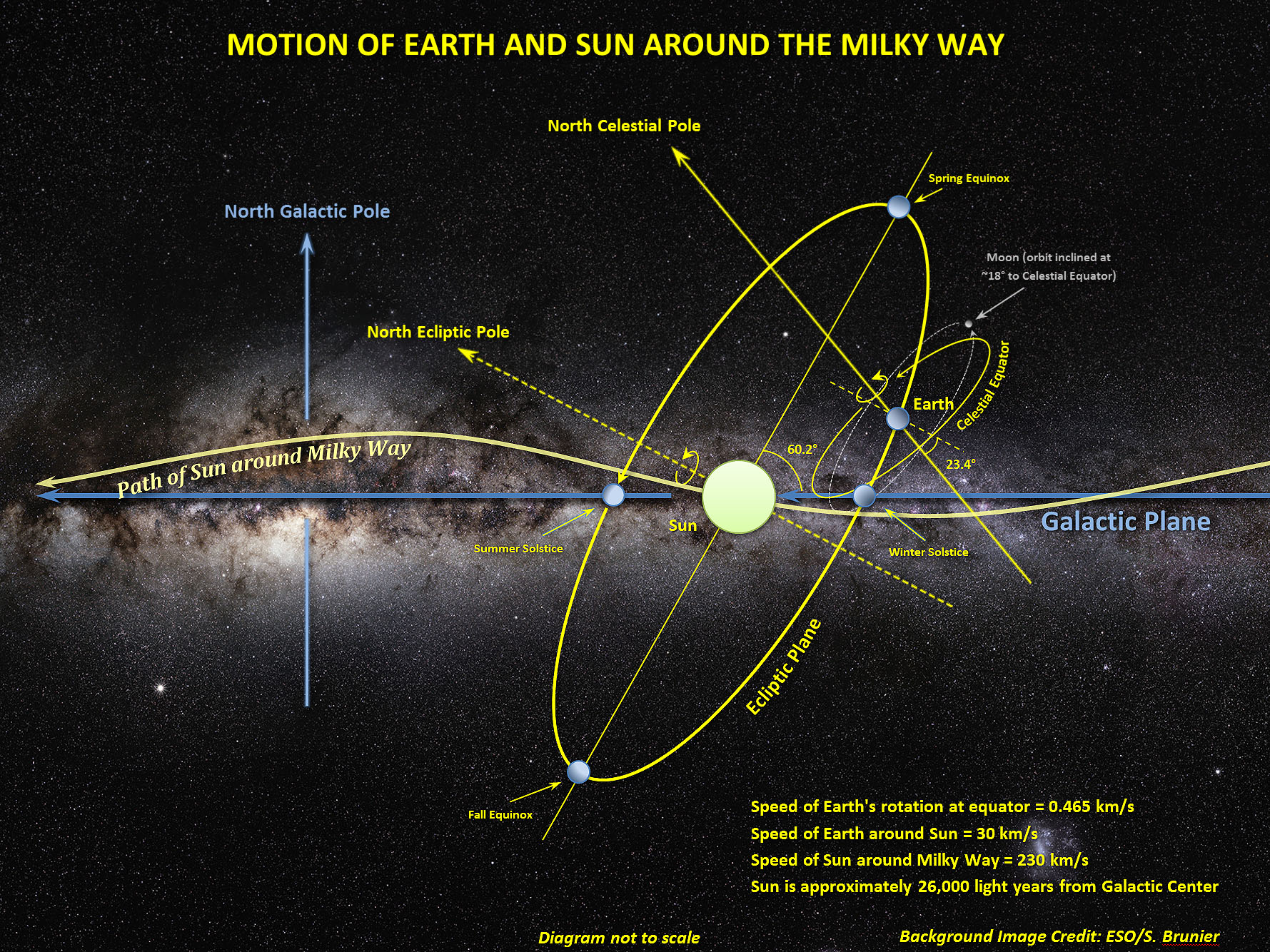
The orientation of the Solar System's motion

- Galactic Tick Day
- Geologic time scale
