= Future of Earth =

Long-term future of planet Earth

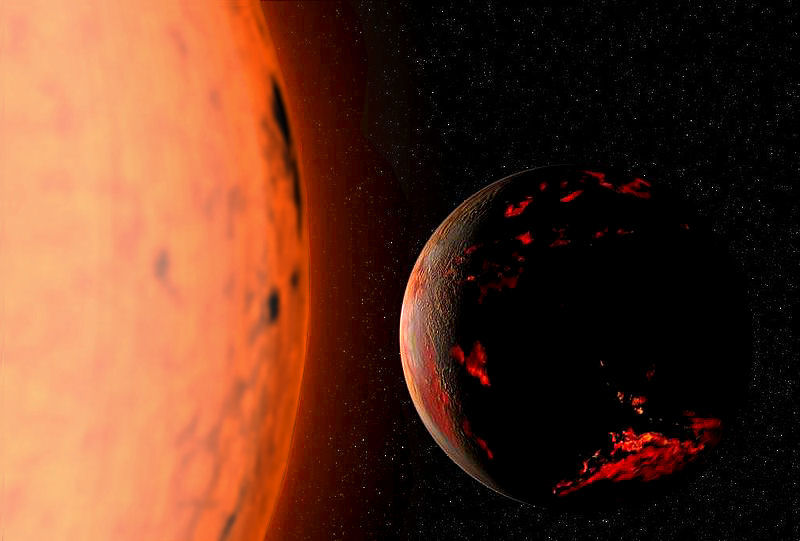
Conjectured illustration of the scorched Earth after the Sun has entered the red giant phase, about 5–7 billion years from now

The biological and geological future of Earth can be extrapolated based on the estimated effects of several long-term influences. These include the chemistry at Earth's surface, the cooling rate of the planet's interior, gravitational interactions with other objects in the Solar System, and a steady increase in the Sun's luminosity. An uncertain factor is the influence of human technology such as climate engineering, which could cause significant changes to the planet. For example, the current Holocene extinction is being caused by technology, and the effects may last for up to five million years. In turn, technology may result in the extinction of humanity, leaving the planet to gradually return to a slower evolutionary pace resulting solely from long-term natural processes.

Over time intervals of hundreds of millions of years, random celestial events pose a global risk to the biosphere, which can result in mass extinctions. These include impacts by comets or asteroids and the possibility of a near-Earth supernova—a massive stellar explosion within a 100-light-year (31-parsec) radius of the Sun. Other large-scale geological events are more predictable. Milankovitch's theory predicts that the planet will continue to undergo glacial periods at least until the Quaternary glaciation comes to an end. These periods are caused by the variations in eccentricity, axial tilt, and precession of Earth's rotation and orbit. As part of the ongoing supercontinent cycle, plate tectonics will probably create a supercontinent in 250–350 million years. Sometime in the next 1.5–4.5 billion years, Earth's axial tilt may begin to undergo chaotic variations, with changes in the axial tilt of up to 90°.

The luminosity of the Sun will steadily increase, causing a rise in the solar radiation reaching Earth and resulting in a higher rate of weathering of silicate minerals. This will affect the carbonate–silicate cycle, which will reduce the level of carbon dioxide in the atmosphere. About 600 million years from now, the level of carbon dioxide will fall below the level needed to sustain C_{3} carbon fixation photosynthesis used by trees. Some plants use the C_{4} carbon fixation method to persist at carbon dioxide concentrations as low as ten parts per million. However, in the long term, plants will likely die off altogether. The extinction of plants would cause the demise of almost all animal life since plants are the base of much of the animal food chain.

In about one billion years, solar luminosity will be 10% higher, causing the atmosphere to become a "moist greenhouse", resulting in a runaway evaporation of the oceans. As a likely consequence, plate tectonics and the entire carbon cycle will end. Then, in about 2–3 billion years, the planet's magnetic dynamo may cease, causing the magnetosphere to decay, leading to an accelerated loss of volatiles from the outer atmosphere. Four billion years from now, the increase in Earth's surface temperature will cause a runaway greenhouse effect, creating conditions more extreme than present-day Venus and heating Earth's surface enough to melt it. By that point, all life on Earth will be extinct. Finally, the planet will possibly be engulfed by the Sun in about 7.6 billion years, after the star has entered the red giant phase and expanded beyond the planet's current orbit. However, a study in 2026 suggests that it is likely that the Earth will survive engulfment.

== Human influence ==
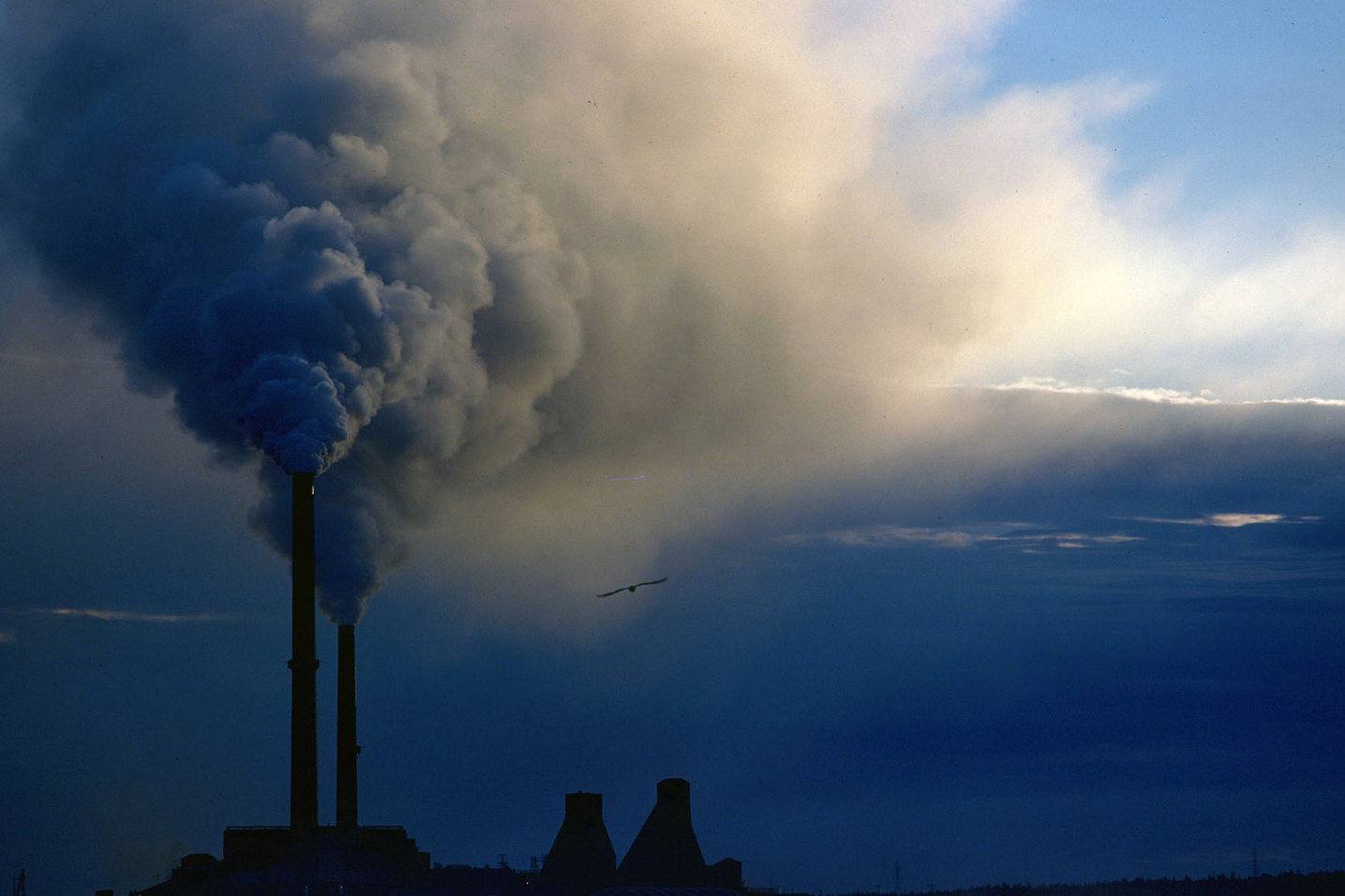
Horne foundry copper smelter in Rouyn-Noranda, Canada, graphically demonstrating human-generated gaseous emissions

Humans play a key role in the biosphere, with the large human population dominating many of Earth's ecosystems. This has resulted in a widespread, ongoing mass extinction of other species during the present geological epoch, now known as the Holocene extinction. The large-scale loss of species caused by human influence since the 1950s has been called a biotic crisis, with an estimated 10% of the total species lost as of 2007. At current rates, about 30% of species are at risk of extinction in the next hundred years. The Holocene extinction event is the result of habitat destruction, the widespread distribution of invasive species, poaching, and climate change. In the present day, human activity has had a significant impact on the surface of the planet. More than a third of the land surface has been modified by human actions, and humans use about 20% of global primary production. The concentration of carbon dioxide in the atmosphere has increased by close to 50% since the start of the Industrial Revolution.

The consequences of a persistent biotic crisis have been predicted to last for at least five million years. It could result in a decline in biodiversity and homogenization of biotas, accompanied by a proliferation of species that are opportunistic, such as pests and weeds. Novel species may emerge; in particular taxa that prosper in human-dominated ecosystems may rapidly diversify into many new species. Microbes are likely to benefit from the increase in nutrient-enriched environmental niches. No new species of existing large vertebrates are likely to arise and food chains will probably be shortened.

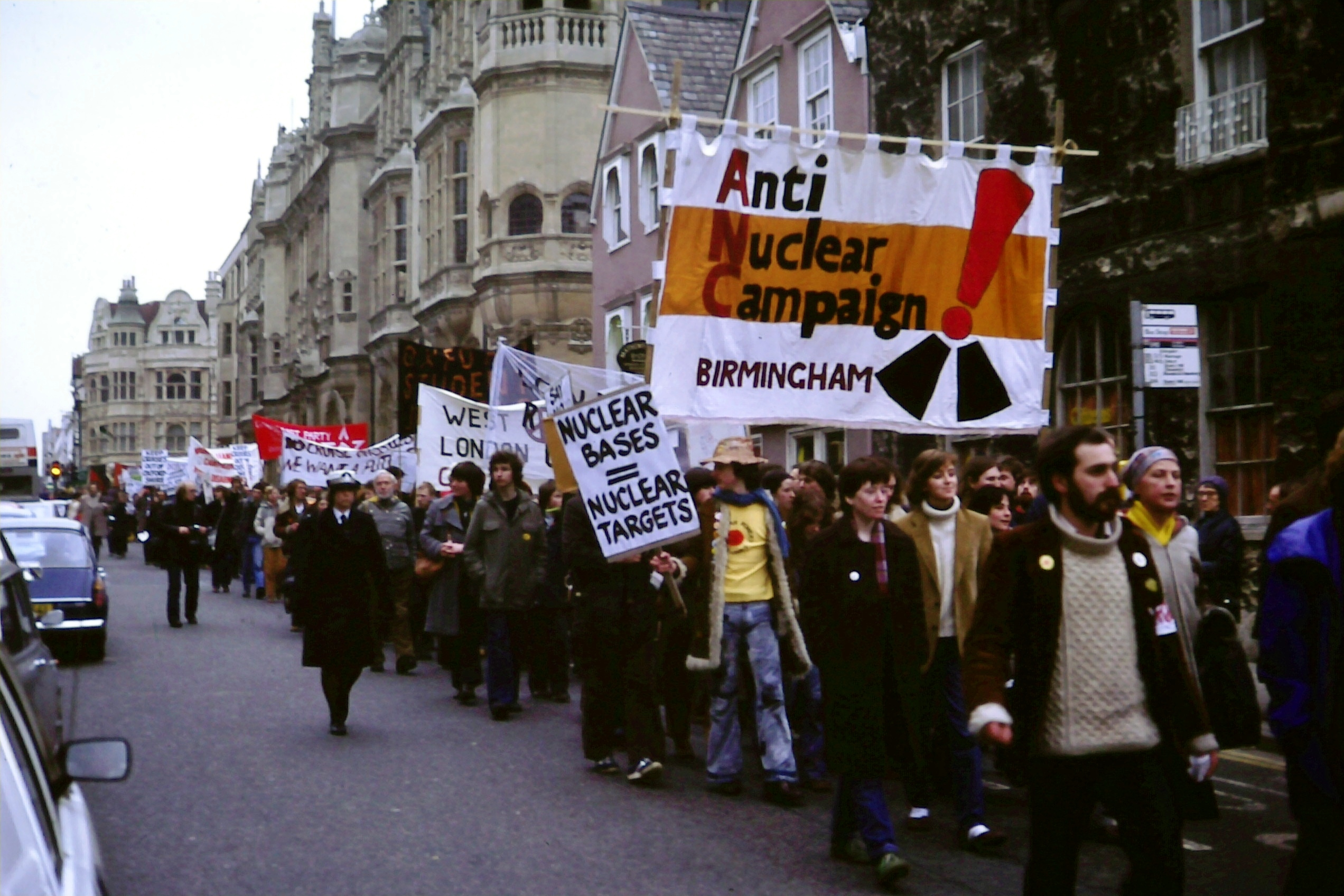
Anti-nuclear weapons protest march in Oxford, 1980

There are multiple scenarios for known risks that can have a global impact on the planet. From the perspective of humanity, these can be subdivided into survivable risks and terminal risks. Risks that humans pose to themselves include climate change, the misuse of nanotechnology, a nuclear holocaust, warfare with a programmed superintelligence, a genetically engineered disease, or a disaster caused by a physics experiment. Similarly, several natural events may pose a doomsday threat, including a highly virulent disease, the impact of an asteroid or comet, runaway greenhouse effect, and resource depletion. There may be the possibility of an infestation by an extraterrestrial lifeform. The actual odds of these scenarios occurring are difficult if not impossible to deduce.

Should the human species become extinct, then the various features assembled by humanity will begin to decay. The largest structures have an estimated decay half-life of about 1,000 years. The last surviving structures would most likely be open-pit mines, large landfills, major highways, wide canal cuts, and earth-fill flank dams. A few massive stone monuments like the pyramids at the Giza Necropolis or the sculptures at Mount Rushmore may still survive in some form after a million years. (Note: See also: Life After People, about the decay of structures (if humans disappeared).)

== Cataclysmic astronomical events ==
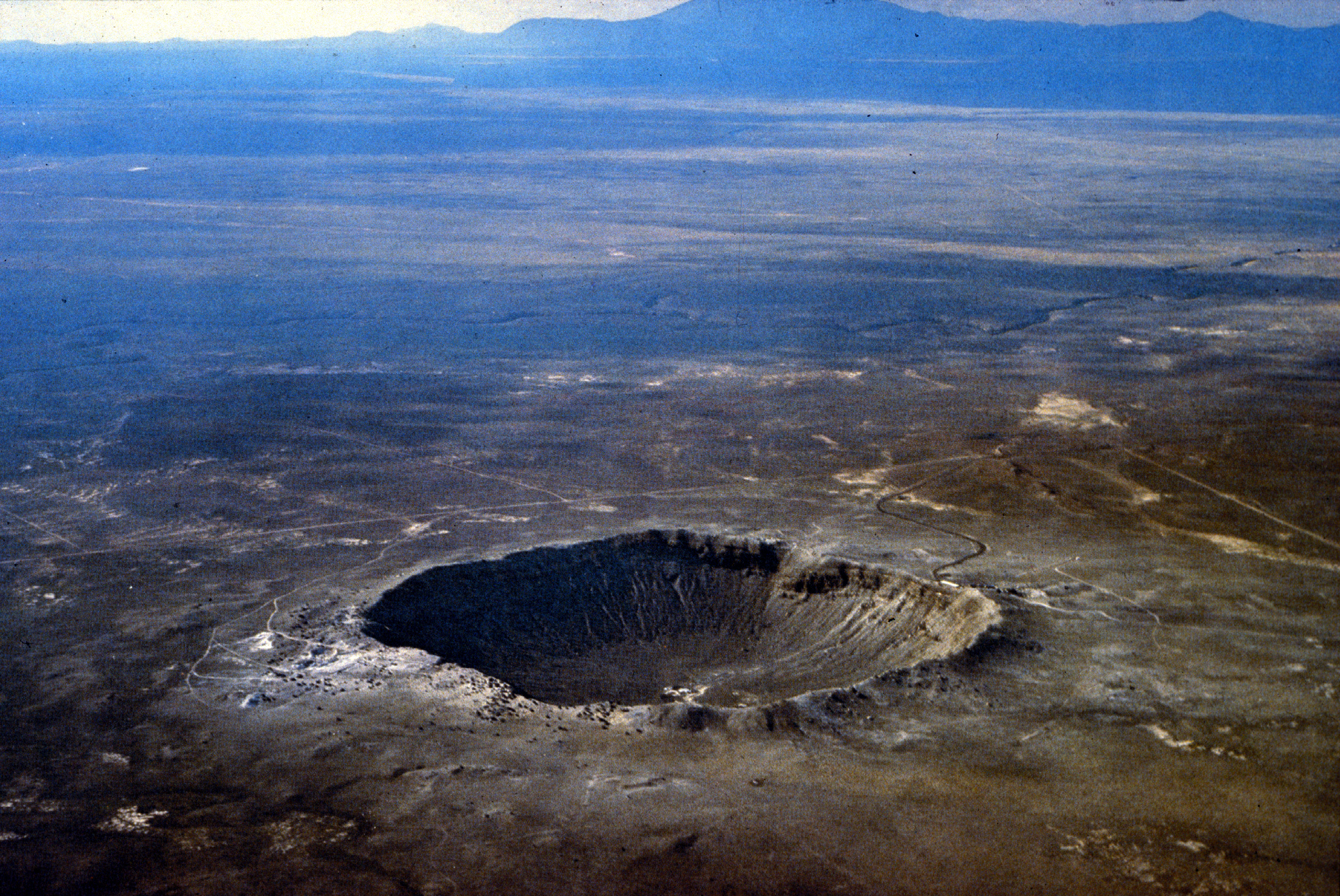
The Barringer Meteorite Crater in Flagstaff, Arizona, showing evidence of the impact of celestial objects upon Earth

As the Sun orbits the Milky Way, wandering stars such as Gliese 710 may approach close enough to have a disruptive influence on the Solar System. A close stellar encounter could cause a significant reduction in the perihelion distances of comets in the Oort cloud—a hypothetical spherical region of icy bodies orbiting within half a light-year of the Sun. Such an encounter could trigger a 40-fold increase in the number of comets reaching the inner Solar System. Impacts from these comets could trigger a mass extinction of life on Earth. These disruptive encounters are estimated to occur an average of once every 45 million years. There is a 1% chance every billion years that a star will pass within 100 AU of the Sun, potentially disrupting the Solar System. The mean time for the Sun to collide with another star in the solar neighborhood is approximately 30 trillion (3×10^{13}) years, which is much longer than the estimated age of the Universe, at approximately 13.8 billion years. This can be taken as an indication of the low likelihood of such an event occurring during the lifetime of the Earth. Based on results from the Gaia telescope's second data release from April 2018, an estimated 694 stars will approach the Solar System to less than 5 parsecs in the next 15 million years. Of these, 26 have a good probability to come within 1.0 parsec (3.3 light-years) and 7 within 0.5 parsecs (1.6 light-years).

The energy released from the impact of an asteroid or comet with a diameter of 5–10 km (3–6 mi) or larger is sufficient to create a global environmental disaster and cause a statistically significant increase in the number of species extinctions. Among the deleterious effects resulting from a major impact event is a cloud of fine dust ejecta blanketing the planet, blocking some direct sunlight from reaching the Earth's surface thus lowering land temperatures by about 15 °C (27 °F) within a week and halting photosynthesis for several months (similar to a nuclear winter). The mean time between major impacts is estimated to be at least 100 million years. During the last 540 million years, simulations demonstrated that such an impact rate is sufficient to cause five or six mass extinctions and 20 to 30 lower severity events. This matches the geologic record of significant extinctions during the Phanerozoic Eon. Such events can be expected to continue.

A supernova is a cataclysmic explosion of a star. Within the Milky Way galaxy, supernova explosions occur on average once every 40 years. During the history of Earth, multiple such events have likely occurred within a distance of 100 light-years; known as a near-Earth supernova. Explosions inside this distance can contaminate the planet with radioisotopes and possibly impact the biosphere. Gamma rays emitted by a supernova react with nitrogen in the atmosphere, producing nitrous oxides. These molecules cause a depletion of the ozone layer that protects the surface from ultraviolet (UV) radiation from the Sun. An increase in UV-B radiation of only 10–30% is sufficient to cause a significant impact on life; particularly to the phytoplankton that form the base of the oceanic food chain. A supernova explosion at a distance of 26 light-years will reduce the ozone column density by half. On average, a supernova explosion occurs within 32 light-years once every few hundred million years, resulting in a depletion of the ozone layer lasting several centuries. Over the next two billion years, it is predicted that there will be about 20 supernova explosions and one gamma ray burst that will have a significant impact on the planet's biosphere.

The incremental effect of gravitational perturbations between the planets causes the inner Solar System as a whole to behave chaotically over long time periods. This does not significantly affect the stability of the Solar System over intervals of a few million years or less, but over billions of years, the orbits of the planets become unpredictable. Computer simulations of the Solar System's evolution over the next five billion years suggest that there is a small (less than 1%) chance that a collision could occur between Earth and either Mercury, Venus, or Mars. During the same interval, the odds that Earth will be scattered out of the Solar System by a passing star are on the order of 1 in 100,000 (0.001%). In such a scenario, the oceans would freeze solid within several million years, leaving only a few pockets of liquid water about 14 km (9 mi) underground. There is a remote chance that Earth will instead be captured by a passing binary star system, allowing the planet's biosphere to remain intact. The odds of this happening are about 1 in 3 million.

== Orbit and rotation ==
The gravitational perturbations of the other planets in the Solar System combine to modify the orbit of Earth and the orientation of its rotation axis. These changes can influence the planetary climate. Despite such interactions, highly accurate simulations show that overall, Earth's orbit is likely to remain dynamically stable for billions of years into the future. In all 1,600 simulations, the planet's semimajor axis, eccentricity, and inclination remained nearly constant.

=== Glaciation ===
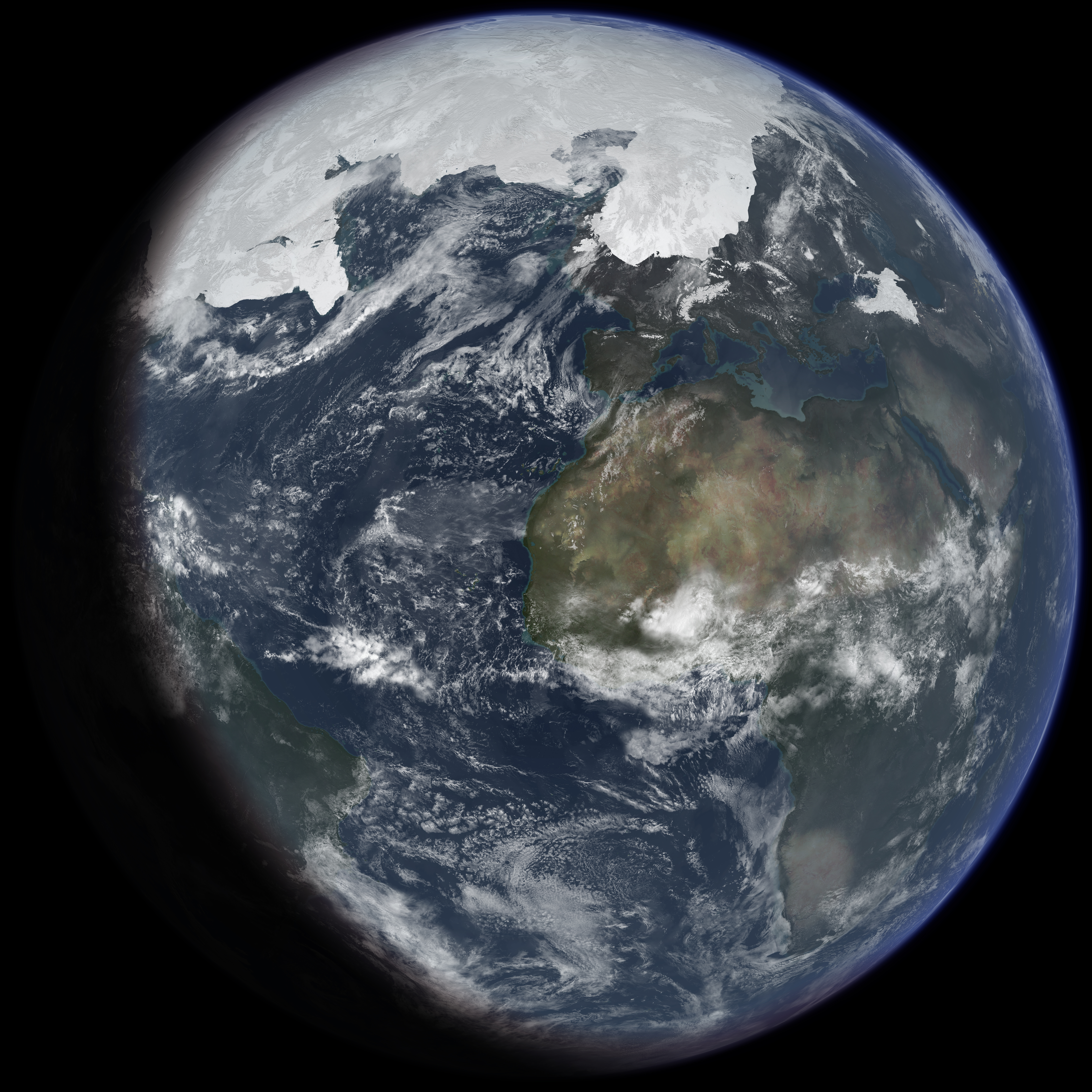
An artist's impression of ice age Earth at glacial maximum.

Historically, there have been cyclical ice ages in which glacial sheets periodically covered the higher latitudes of the continents. Ice ages may occur because of changes in ocean circulation and continentality induced by plate tectonics. The Milankovitch theory predicts that glacial periods occur during ice ages because of astronomical factors in combination with climate feedback mechanisms. The primary astronomical drivers are a higher than normal orbital eccentricity, a low axial tilt (or obliquity), and the alignment of the northern hemisphere's summer solstice with the aphelion. Each of these effects occur cyclically. For example, the eccentricity changes over time cycles of about 100,000 and 400,000 years, with the value ranging from less than 0.01 up to 0.05. This is equivalent to a change of the semiminor axis of the planet's orbit from 99.95% of the semimajor axis to 99.88%, respectively.

Earth is passing through an ice age known as the Quaternary glaciation, and is presently in the Holocene interglacial period. This period would normally be expected to end in about 25,000 years. However, the increased rate at which humans release carbon dioxide into the atmosphere may delay the onset of the next glacial period until at least 50,000–130,000 years from now. On the other hand, a global warming period of finite duration (based on the assumption that fossil fuel use will cease by the year 2200) will probably only impact the glacial period for about 5,000 years. Thus, a brief period of global warming induced by a few centuries' worth of greenhouse gas emission would only have a limited impact in the long term.

=== Obliquity ===
The rotational offset of the tidal bulge exerts a net torque on the Moon, boosting it while slowing the Earth's rotation (not to scale).

The tidal acceleration of the Moon slows the rotation rate of the Earth and increases the Earth-Moon distance. Friction effects—between the core and mantle and between the atmosphere and surface—can dissipate the Earth's rotational energy. These combined effects are expected to increase the length of the day by more than 1.5 hours over the next 250 million years, and to increase the obliquity by about a half degree. The distance to the Moon will increase by about 1.5 Earth radii during the same period.

Based on computer models, the presence of the Moon appears to stabilize the obliquity of the Earth, which may help the planet to avoid dramatic climate changes. This stability is achieved because the Moon increases the precession rate of the Earth's rotation axis, thereby avoiding resonances between the precession of the rotation and precession of the planet's orbital plane (that is, the precession motion of the ecliptic). However, as the semimajor axis of the Moon's orbit continues to increase, this stabilizing effect will diminish. At some point, perturbation effects will probably cause chaotic variations in the obliquity of the Earth, and the axial tilt may change by angles as high as 90° from the plane of the orbit. This is expected to occur between 1.5 and 4.5 billion years from now.

A high obliquity would probably result in dramatic changes in the climate and may destroy the planet's habitability. When the axial tilt of the Earth exceeds 54°, the yearly insolation at the equator is less than that at the poles. The planet could remain at an obliquity of 60° to 90° for periods as long as 10 million years.

== Geodynamics ==
Pangaea was the last supercontinent to form before the present.

Tectonics-based events will continue to occur well into the future and the surface will be steadily reshaped by tectonic uplift, extrusions, and erosion. Mount Vesuvius can be expected to erupt about 40 times over the next 1,000 years. During the same period, about five to seven earthquakes of magnitude 8 or greater should occur along the San Andreas Fault, while about 50 events of magnitude 9 may be expected worldwide. Mauna Loa should experience about 200 eruptions over the next 1,000 years, and the Old Faithful Geyser will likely cease to operate. The Niagara Falls will continue to retreat upstream, reaching Buffalo in about 30,000–50,000 years. Supervolcano events are the most impactful geological hazards, generating over 1,000 km^{3} of fragmented material and covering thousands of square kilometers with ash deposits. However, they are comparatively rare, occurring on average every 100,000 years.

In 10,000 years, the post-glacial rebound of the Baltic Sea will have reduced the depth by about 90 m (300 ft). The Hudson Bay will decrease in depth by 100 m over the same period. After 100,000 years, the island of Hawaii will have shifted about 9 km (5.6 mi) to the northwest. The planet may be entering another glacial period by this time.

=== Continental drift ===
The theory of plate tectonics demonstrates that the continents of the Earth are moving across the surface at the rate of a few centimeters per year. This is expected to continue, causing the plates to relocate and collide. Continental drift is facilitated by two factors: the energy generated within the planet and the presence of a hydrosphere. With the loss of either of these, continental drift will come to a halt. The production of heat through radiogenic processes is sufficient to maintain mantle convection and plate subduction for at least the next 1.1 billion years.

At present, the continents of North and South America are moving westward from Africa and Europe. Researchers have produced several scenarios about how this will continue in the future. These geodynamic models can be distinguished by the subduction flux, whereby the oceanic crust moves under a continent. In the introversion model, the younger, interior, Atlantic Ocean becomes preferentially subducted and the current migration of North and South America is reversed. In the extroversion model, the older, exterior, Pacific Ocean remains preferentially subducted and North and South America migrate toward eastern Asia.

As the understanding of geodynamics improves, these models will be subject to revision. In 2008, for example, a computer simulation was used to predict that a reorganization of the mantle convection will occur over the next 100 million years, creating a new supercontinent composed of Africa, Eurasia, Australia, Antarctica and South America to form around Antarctica.

Regardless of the outcome of the continental migration, the continued subduction process causes water to be transported to the mantle. After a billion years from the present, a geophysical model gives an estimate that 27% of the current ocean mass will have been subducted. If this process were to continue unmodified into the future, the subduction and release would reach an equilibrium after 65% of the current ocean mass has been subducted.

==== Introversion ====
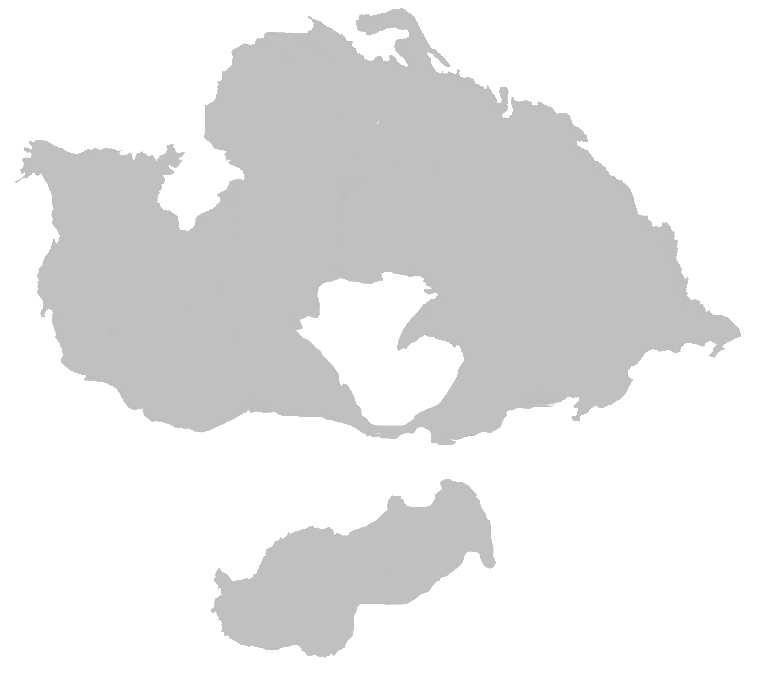
A rough approximation of Pangaea Ultima, one of the four models for a future supercontinent

Christopher Scotese and his colleagues have mapped out the predicted motions several hundred million years into the future as part of the Paleomap Project. In their scenario, 50 million years from now the Mediterranean Sea may vanish, and the collision between Europe and Africa will create a long mountain range extending to the current location of the Persian Gulf. Australia will merge with Indonesia, and Baja California will slide northward along the coast. New subduction zones may appear off the eastern coast of North and South America, and mountain chains will form along those coastlines. The migration of Antarctica to the north will cause all of its ice sheets to melt. This, along with the melting of the Greenland ice sheets, will raise the average ocean level by 90 m (300 ft). The inland flooding of the continents will result in climate changes.

As this scenario continues, by 100 million years from the present, the continental spreading will have reached its maximum extent and the continents will then begin to coalesce. In 250 million years, North America will collide with Africa. South America will wrap around the southern tip of Africa. The result will be the formation of a new supercontinent (sometimes called Pangaea Ultima), with the Pacific Ocean stretching across half the planet. Antarctica will reverse direction and return to the South Pole, building up a new ice cap.

==== Extroversion ====
The first scientist to extrapolate the current motions of the continents was Canadian geologist Paul F. Hoffman of Harvard University. In 1992, Hoffman predicted that the continents of North and South America would continue to advance across the Pacific Ocean, pivoting about Siberia until they begin to merge with Asia. He dubbed the resulting supercontinent, Amasia. Later, in the 1990s, Roy Livermore calculated a similar scenario. He predicted that Antarctica would start to migrate northward, and East Africa and Madagascar would move across the Indian Ocean to collide with Asia.

In an extroversion model, the closure of the Pacific Ocean would be complete in about 350 million years. This marks the completion of the current supercontinent cycle, wherein the continents split apart and then rejoin each other about every 400–500 million years. Once the supercontinent is built, plate tectonics may enter a period of inactivity as the rate of subduction drops by an order of magnitude. This period of stability could cause an increase in the mantle temperature at the rate of 30–100 °C (54–180 °F) every 100 million years, which is the minimum lifetime of past supercontinents. As a consequence, volcanic activity may increase.

==== Supercontinent ====
The formation of a supercontinent can dramatically affect the environment. The collision of plates will result in mountain building, thereby shifting weather patterns. Sea levels may fall because of increased glaciation. The rate of surface weathering can rise, increasing the rate at which organic material is buried. Supercontinents can cause a drop in global temperatures and an increase in atmospheric oxygen. This, in turn, can affect the climate, further lowering temperatures. All of these changes can result in more rapid biological evolution as new niches emerge.

The formation of a supercontinent insulates the mantle. The flow of heat will be concentrated, resulting in volcanism and the flooding of large areas with basalt. Rifts will form and the supercontinent will split up once more. The planet may then experience a warming period as occurred during the Cretaceous period, which marked the split-up of the previous Pangaea supercontinent.

=== Solidification of the outer core ===
Fluid convection in the outer core produces a dynamo effect

The iron-rich core region of the Earth is divided into a 2,440 km (1,520 mi) diameter solid inner core and a 6,960 km (4,320 mi) diameter liquid outer core. The rotation of the Earth creates convective eddies in the outer core region that cause it to function as a dynamo. This generates a magnetosphere about the Earth that deflects particles from the solar wind, which prevents significant erosion of the atmosphere from sputtering. As heat from the core is transferred outward toward the mantle, the net trend is for the inner boundary of the liquid outer core region to freeze, thereby releasing thermal energy and causing the solid inner core to grow. This iron crystallization process has been ongoing for about a billion years. In the modern era, the radius of the inner core is expanding at an average rate of roughly 0.5 mm (0.02 in) per year, at the expense of the outer core. Nearly all of the energy needed to power the dynamo is being supplied by this process of inner core formation.

The inner core is expected to consume most or all of the outer core 3–4 billion years from now, resulting in an almost completely solidified core composed of iron and other heavy elements. The surviving liquid envelope will mainly consist of lighter elements that will undergo less mixing. Alternatively, if at some point plate tectonics cease, the interior will cool less efficiently, which would slow down or even stop the inner core's growth. In either case, this can result in the loss of the magnetic dynamo. Without a functioning dynamo, the magnetic field of the Earth will decay in a geologically short time period of roughly 10,000 years. The loss of the magnetosphere will cause an increase in erosion of light elements, particularly hydrogen, from the Earth's outer atmosphere into space, resulting in less favorable conditions for life.

== Solar evolution ==
The energy generation of the Sun is based upon thermonuclear fusion of hydrogen into helium. This occurs in the core region of the star using the proton–proton chain reaction process. Because there is no convection in the solar core, the helium concentration builds up in that region without being distributed throughout the star. The temperature at the core of the Sun is too low for nuclear fusion of helium atoms through the triple-alpha process, so these atoms do not contribute to the net energy generation that is needed to maintain hydrostatic equilibrium of the Sun.

At present, nearly half the hydrogen at the core has been consumed, with the remainder of the atoms consisting primarily of helium. As the number of hydrogen atoms per unit mass decreases, so too does their energy output provided through nuclear fusion. This results in a decrease in pressure support, which causes the core to contract until the increased density and temperature bring the core pressure into equilibrium with the layers above. The higher temperature causes the remaining hydrogen to undergo fusion at a more rapid rate, thereby generating the energy needed to maintain the equilibrium.

Evolution of the Sun's luminosity, radius and effective temperature compared to the present Sun. After Ribas (2010).

The result of this process has been a steady increase in the energy output of the Sun. When the Sun first became a main sequence star, it radiated only 70% of the current luminosity. The luminosity has increased in a nearly linear fashion to the present, rising by 1% every 110 million years. Likewise, in three billion years the Sun is expected to be 33% more luminous. The hydrogen fuel at the core will finally be exhausted in five billion years, when the Sun will be 67% more luminous than at present. Thereafter, the Sun will continue to burn hydrogen in a shell surrounding its core until the luminosity reaches 121% above the present value. This marks the end of the Sun's main-sequence lifetime, and thereafter it will pass through the subgiant stage and evolve into a red giant.

By this time, the collision of the Milky Way and Andromeda galaxies should be underway. Although this could result in the Solar System being ejected from the newly combined galaxy, it is considered unlikely to have any adverse effect on the Sun or its planets.

=== Climate impact ===
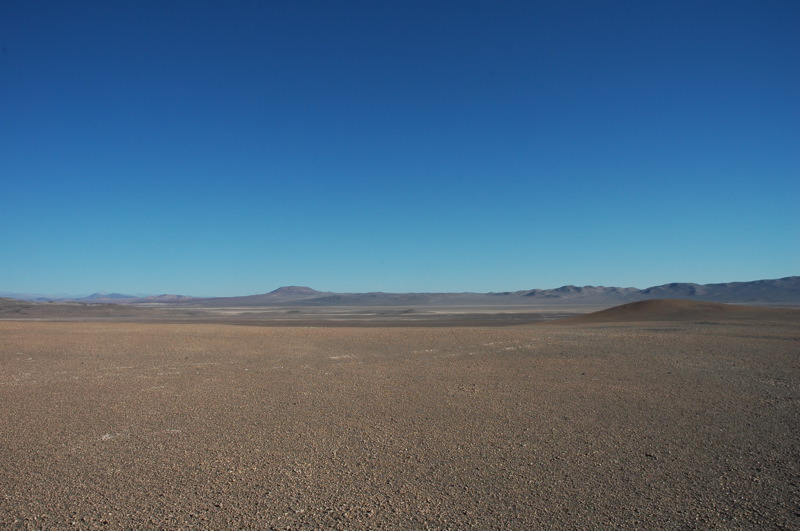
In the far future, most of Earth's land will likely be a barren desert, like the Atacama Desert in Chile.

The rate of weathering of silicate minerals will increase as rising temperatures speed chemical processes up. This, in turn, will decrease the level of carbon dioxide in the atmosphere, as reactions with silicate minerals convert carbon dioxide gas into solid carbonates. Within the next 600 million years from the present, the concentration of carbon dioxide will fall below the critical threshold needed to sustain C_{3} photosynthesis: about 50 parts per million. At this point, trees and forests in their current forms will no longer be able to survive. This decline in plant life is likely to be a long-term decline rather than a sharp drop. Plant groups will likely die one by one well before the 50 parts per million level is reached. The first plants to disappear will be C_{3} herbaceous plants, followed by deciduous forests, evergreen broad-leaf forests and finally evergreen conifers. However, C_{4} carbon fixation can continue at much lower concentrations, down to above 10 parts per million; thus, plants using C_{4} photosynthesis may be able to survive for at least 0.8 billion years and possibly as long as 1.2 billion years from now, after which rising temperatures will make the biosphere unsustainable. Researchers at Caltech have suggested that once C_{3} plants die off, the lack of biological production of oxygen and nitrogen will cause a reduction in Earth's atmospheric pressure, which will counteract the temperature rise, and allow enough carbon dioxide to persist for photosynthesis to continue. This would allow life to survive up to 2 billion years from now, at which point water would be the limiting factor. Currently, C_{4} plants represent about 5% of Earth's plant biomass and 1% of its known plant species. For example, about 50% of all grass species (Poaceae) use the C_{4} photosynthetic pathway, as do many species in the herbaceous family Amaranthaceae.

When the carbon dioxide levels fall to the limit where photosynthesis is barely sustainable, the proportion of carbon dioxide in the atmosphere is expected to oscillate up and down. This will allow land vegetation to flourish each time the level of carbon dioxide rises due to tectonic activity and respiration from animal life; however, the long-term trend is for the plant life on land to die off altogether as most of the remaining carbon in the atmosphere becomes sequestered in the Earth. Plants—and, by extension, animals—could survive longer by evolving other strategies such as requiring less carbon dioxide for photosynthetic processes, becoming carnivorous, adapting to desiccation, or associating with fungi. These adaptations are likely to appear near the beginning of the moist greenhouse (see further).

The loss of higher plant life will result in the eventual loss of oxygen as well as ozone due to the respiration of animals, chemical reactions in the atmosphere, and volcanic eruptions. Modeling of the decline in oxygenation predicts that it may drop to 1% of the current atmospheric levels by one billion years from now. This decline will result in less attenuation of DNA-damaging UV, as well as the death of animals; the first animals to disappear would be large mammals, followed by small mammals, birds, amphibians and large fish, reptiles and small fish, and finally invertebrates.

Before this happens, it is expected that life would concentrate at refugia of lower temperatures such as high elevations where less land surface area is available, thus restricting population sizes. Smaller animals would survive better than larger ones because of lesser oxygen requirements, while birds would fare better than mammals thanks to their ability to travel large distances looking for cooler temperatures. Based on oxygen's half-life in the atmosphere, animal life would last at most 100 million years after the loss of higher plants. Some cyanobacteria and phytoplankton could outlive plants due to their tolerance for carbon dioxide levels as low as 1 ppm, and may survive for around the same time as animals before carbon dioxide becomes too depleted to support any form of photosynthesis.

In their work The Life and Death of Planet Earth, authors Peter D. Ward and Donald Brownlee have argued that some form of animal life may continue even after most of the Earth's plant life has disappeared. Ward and Brownlee use fossil evidence from the Burgess Shale in British Columbia, Canada, to determine the climate of the Cambrian Explosion, and use it to predict the climate of the future when rising global temperatures caused by a warming Sun and declining oxygen levels result in the final extinction of animal life. Initially, they expect that some insects, lizards, birds, and small mammals may persist, along with sea life; however, without oxygen replenishment by plant life, they believe that animals would probably die off from asphyxiation within a few million years. Even if sufficient oxygen were to remain in the atmosphere through the persistence of some form of photosynthesis, the steady rise in global temperature would result in a gradual loss of biodiversity.

As temperatures rise, the last of animal life will be driven toward the poles, possibly underground. They would become primarily active during the polar night, aestivating during the polar day due to the intense heat. Much of the surface would become a barren desert and life would primarily be found in the oceans. However, due to a decrease in the amount of organic matter entering the oceans from land as well as a decrease in dissolved oxygen, sea life would disappear too, following a similar path to that on Earth's surface. This process would start with the loss of freshwater species and conclude with invertebrates, particularly those that do not depend on living plants such as termites or those near hydrothermal vents such as worms of the genus Riftia. As a result of these processes, multicellular life forms may be extinct in about 800 million years, and eukaryotes in 1.3 billion years, leaving only the prokaryotes.

An alternate scenario that may occur is that, according to a 2024 study in The Planetary Science Journal, assuming that weathering is only weakly correlated with rising temperatures, multicellular life may survive much longer, beyond 1 billion years for a while. In this scenario, silicate weathering does not increase fast enough to deplete atmospheric carbon dioxide. Such levels would only fall below the threshold for plants utilizing C_{3} photosynthesis leading to their extinction in 800 million years. However, carbon dioxide levels would remain sustainable for C_{4} photosynthesis, only declining below present levels in 1.1 billion years. As such, the remaining plant life and subsequently animal life will survive for substantially longer. By 1.6 billion years from now, however, as the Earth's surface temperature rises to about 338 K (65 °C; 149 °F), the maximum tolerance temperature as documented for a symbiont of Dichanthelium lanuginosum, these processes will eventually force weathering to accelerate and will lead to carbon dioxide levels falling below the threshold for C_{4} plants. The end result would be carbon dioxide starvation, oxygen depletion, and then extinction of the remaining plant and animal life in 1.86 billion years.

=== Loss of oceans ===
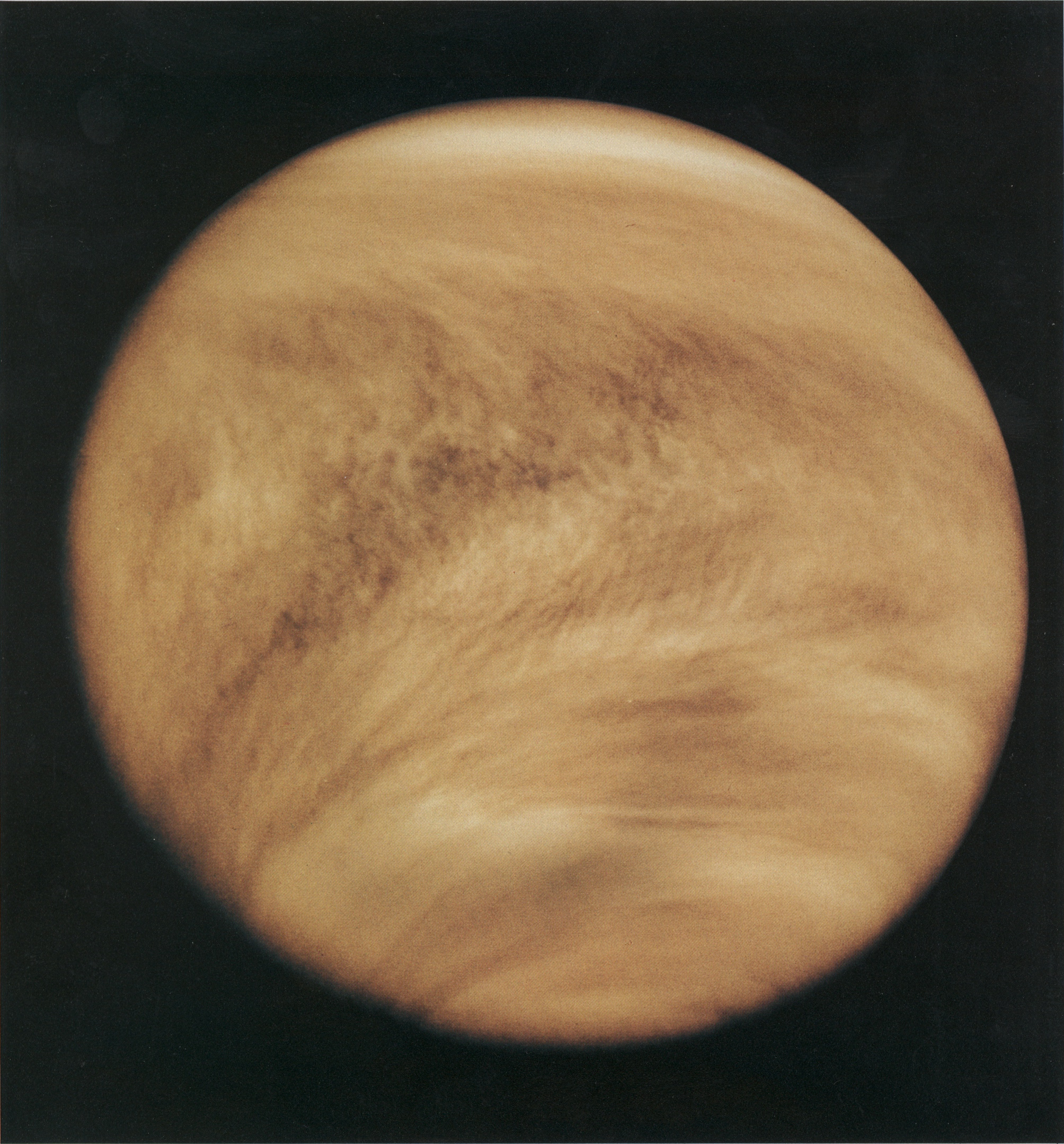
The atmosphere of Venus is in a "super-greenhouse" state. Earth in a few billion years could likely resemble present Venus.

One billion years from now, about 27% of the modern ocean will have been subducted into the mantle. If this process were allowed to continue uninterrupted, it would reach an equilibrium state where 65% of the present day surface reservoir would remain at the surface. Once the solar luminosity is 10% higher than its current value, the average global surface temperature will rise to 320 K (47 °C; 116 °F). The atmosphere will become a "moist greenhouse" leading to a runaway evaporation of the oceans. At this point, models of the Earth's future environment demonstrate that the stratosphere would contain increasing levels of water. These water molecules will be broken down through photodissociation by solar UV, allowing hydrogen to escape the atmosphere. The net result would be a loss of the world's seawater in about 1 to 1.5 billion years from the present, depending on the model.

There will be one of two variations of this future warming feedback: the "moist greenhouse" where water vapor dominates the troposphere while water vapor starts to accumulate in the stratosphere (if the oceans evaporate very quickly), and the "runaway greenhouse" where water vapor becomes a dominant component of the atmosphere (if the oceans evaporate too slowly). In this ocean-free era, there would continue to be surface reservoirs as water is steadily released from the deep crust and mantle, which could contain an amount of water equivalent to several times that present in the Earth's oceans. Some water may be retained at the poles and there may be occasional rainstorms, but for the most part, the planet would be a desert with large dunefields covering its equator, and a few salt flats on what was once the ocean floor, similar to the ones in the Atacama Desert in Chile.

With no water to serve as a lubricant, plate tectonics would likely stop and the most visible signs of geological activity would be shield volcanoes located above mantle hotspots. In these arid conditions the planet may retain some microbial and possibly even multicellular life. Most of these microbes will be halophiles and life could find refuge in the atmosphere as has been proposed to have happened on Venus. However, the increasingly extreme conditions will likely lead to the extinction of the prokaryotes between 1.6 billion years and 2.8 billion years from now, with the last of them living in residual ponds of water at high latitudes and heights or in caverns with trapped ice. However, underground life could last longer.

What proceeds after this depends on the level of tectonic activity. A steady release of carbon dioxide by volcanic eruption could cause the atmosphere to enter a "super-greenhouse" state like that of the planet Venus. But, as stated above, without surface water, plate tectonics would probably come to a halt and most of the carbonates would remain securely buried until the Sun becomes a red giant and its increased luminosity heats the rock to the point of releasing the carbon dioxide. However, as pointed out by Peter Ward and Donald Brownlee in their book The Life and Death of Planet Earth, according to NASA Ames scientist Kevin Zahnle, it is highly possible that plate tectonics may stop long before the loss of the oceans, due to the gradual cooling of the Earth's core, which could happen in just 500 million years. This could potentially turn the Earth back into a water world and perhaps even drown all remaining land life.

The loss of the oceans could be delayed until 2 billion years in the future if the atmospheric pressure were to decline. A lower atmospheric pressure would reduce the greenhouse effect, thereby lowering the surface temperature. This could occur if natural processes were to remove the nitrogen from the atmosphere. Studies of organic sediments have shown that at least 100 kilopascals (0.99 atm) of nitrogen has been removed from the atmosphere over the past four billion years, which is enough to effectively double the current atmospheric pressure if it were to be released. This rate of removal would be sufficient to counter the effects of increasing solar luminosity for the next two billion years.

By 2.8 billion years from now, the surface temperature of the Earth will have reached 422 K (149 °C; 300 °F), even at the poles. At this point, any remaining life will be extinguished due to the extreme conditions. What happens beyond this depends on how much water is left on the surface. If all of the water on Earth has evaporated by this point (via the "moist greenhouse" at ~1 Gyr from now), the planet will stay in the same conditions with a steady increase in the surface temperature until the Sun becomes a red giant. If not and there are still pockets of water left, and they evaporate too slowly, then in about 3–4 billion years, once the amount of water vapor in the lower atmosphere rises to 40%, and the luminosity from the Sun reaches 35–40% more than its present-day value, a "runaway greenhouse" effect will ensue, causing the atmosphere to warm and raising the surface temperature to around 1,600 K (1,330 °C; 2,420 °F). This is sufficient to melt the surface of the planet. However, most of the atmosphere is expected to be retained until the Sun has entered the red giant stage.

With the extinction of life, 2.8 billion years from now, it is expected that Earth's biosignatures will disappear, to be replaced by signatures caused by non-biological processes.

=== Red giant stage ===
The size of the current Sun (now in the main sequence) compared to its estimated size during its red giant phase

Once the Sun changes from burning hydrogen within its core to burning hydrogen in a shell around its core, the core will start to contract, and the outer envelope will expand. The total luminosity will steadily increase over the following billion years until it reaches 2,730 times its current luminosity at the age of 12.167 billion years. Most of Earth's atmosphere will be lost to space. Its surface will consist of a lava ocean with floating continents of metals and metal oxides and icebergs of refractory materials, with its surface temperature reaching more than 2,400 K (2,130 °C; 3,860 °F). The Sun will experience more rapid mass loss, with about 33% of its total mass shed with the solar wind. The loss of mass will mean that the orbits of the planets will expand. The orbital distance of Earth will increase to at most 150% of its current value (that is, 1.5 AU (220 million km; 140 million mi)).

The most rapid part of the Sun's expansion into a red giant will occur during the final stages, when the Sun will be about 12 billion years old. It is likely to expand to swallow both Mercury and Venus, reaching a maximum radius of 1.2 AU (180 million km; 110 million mi). Earth will interact tidally with the Sun's outer atmosphere, which would decrease Earth's orbital radius. Drag from the chromosphere of the Sun would reduce Earth's orbit. These effects will counterbalance the impact of mass loss by the Sun, and the Sun could engulf Earth in about 7.59 billion years from now. However, this outcome remains uncertain.

The drag from the solar atmosphere may cause the orbit of the Moon to decay. Once the orbit of the Moon closes to a distance of 18,470 km (11,480 mi), it will cross Earth's Roche limit, meaning that tidal interaction with Earth would break apart the Moon, turning it into a ring system. Most of the orbiting rings will begin to decay, and the debris will impact Earth. Hence, if the Sun does not swallow the Earth, the planet may be left moonless.

The ablation and vaporization caused by Earth's fall on a decaying trajectory towards the Sun may remove Earth's mantle, leaving just the core, which will finally be destroyed after at most 200 years. Earth's sole legacy will be a very slight increase (0.01%) of the solar metallicity following this event.

=== Beyond and ultimate fate ===
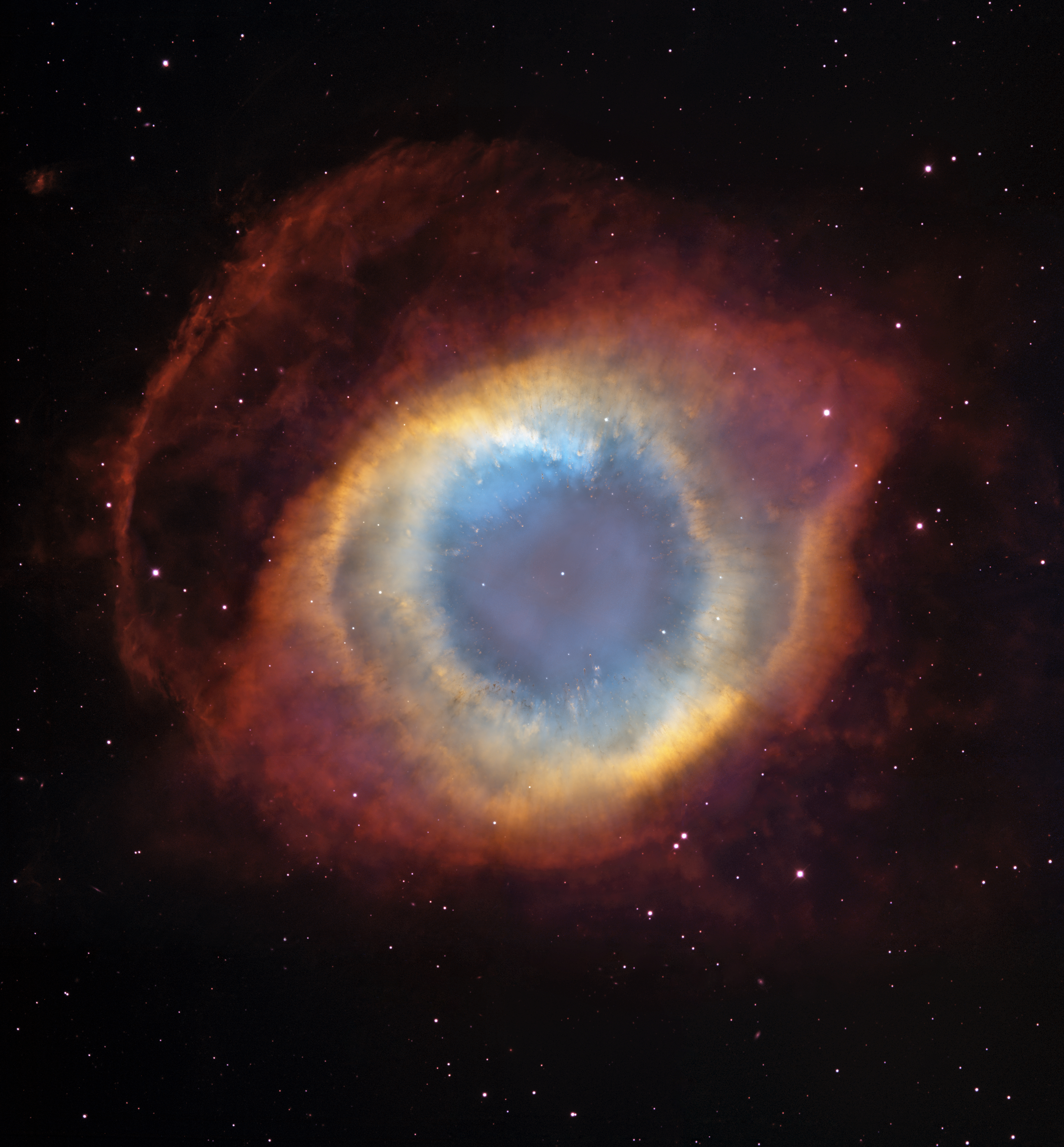
The Helix Nebula, a planetary nebula similar to what the Sun will produce in 8 billion years

After fusing helium in its core to carbon, the Sun will begin to collapse again, evolving into a compact white dwarf star after ejecting its outer atmosphere as a planetary nebula. The predicted final mass is 54% of the present value, most likely consisting primarily of carbon and oxygen.

Currently, the Moon is moving away from Earth at a rate of 4 cm (1.6 inches) per year. In 50 billion years, if the Earth and Moon are not engulfed by the Sun, they will become tidally locked into a larger, stable orbit, with each showing only one face to the other. Thereafter, the tidal action of the Sun will extract angular momentum from the system, causing the orbit of the Moon to decay and the Earth's rotation to accelerate. In about 65 billion years, it is estimated that the Moon may collide with the Earth, due to the remaining energy of the Earth–Moon system being sapped by the remnant Sun, causing the Moon to slowly move inwards toward the Earth.

Beyond this point, the ultimate fate of the Earth (if it survives) depends on what happens. On a time scale of 10^{15} (1 quadrillion) years the remaining planets in the Solar System will be ejected from the system by close encounters with other stellar remnants, and Earth will continue to orbit through the galaxy for around 10^{19} (10 quintillion) years before it is ejected or falls into a supermassive black hole. If Earth is not ejected during a stellar encounter, then its orbit will decay via gravitational radiation until it collides with the Sun in 10^{20} (100 quintillion) years. If proton decay can occur and Earth is ejected to intergalactic space, then it will last around 10^{38} (100 undecillion) years before evaporating into radiation.

== See also ==
- Eschatology – Conceptions of the end of the present age
- Circumstellar habitable zone – Orbits where planets may have liquid surface water
- Fermi paradox – Discrepancy of the lack of evidence for alien life despite its apparent likelihood
- Formation and evolution of the Solar System
- Global catastrophic risk, also known as Risks to civilization, humans, and planet Earth – Hypothetical global-scale disaster risk
- Great Filter – Hypothesis of barriers to forming interstellar civilizations
- History of Earth – Records of Earth's development
- Lava planet – Terrestrial planet with the surface covered by molten lava
- Life on Titan – Scientific assessments on the microbial habitability of Titan
- Medea hypothesis – Hypothesis that multicellular life may be self-destructive
- Moving Earth – Planetary engineering scenario
- Planetary engineering – Influencing a planet's global environments
- Planetary habitability – Known extent to which a planet is suitable for life
- Rare Earth hypothesis – Hypothesis that planets with complex life are extremely rare
- Space and survival – Idea that spacefaring is necessary for long-term human survival
- Speculative evolution – Science fiction genre
- Stability of the Solar System – Long term dynamical interactions that disrupt the Solar System
- Timeline of the far future – Scientific projections regarding the far future
- Ultimate fate of the universe, also known as the end of the universe – Theories about the end of the universe
