= Chronology of continents =

A continent is a large geographical region defined by the continental shelves and the cultures on the continent. In the modern day, there are seven continents. However, there have been more continents throughout history. Vaalbara was the first supercontinent. Europe is the newest continent. Geologists have predicted that certain continents will appear, these being Pangaea Proxima, Novopangaea, Aurica, and Amasia.

== List of continents ==
Name	Era	Time before present	Image	Reference
Vaalbara	Eoarchean	3.6-2.7 Ga		
Ur	Paleoarchean	3.1 Ga		
Kenorland	Neoarchean	2.7 Ga		
Arctica	Neoarchean	2.565 Ga		
Columbia	Paleoproterozoic	2.1-1.5 Ga		
Atlantica	Paleoproterozoic	2.0 Ga		
Nena	Paleoproterozoic	1.9 Ga		
Baltica	Paleoproterozoic	1.8 Ga		
Rodinia	Neoproterozoic	1100-633 Ma		
Avalonia	Neoproterozoic	750 Ma		
Pannotia	Neoproterozoic	500-600 Ma		
Pampia	Neoproterozoic - Cambrian	555-515 Ma		
Gondwana	Neoproterozoic - Mesozoic	550 Ma		
Cimmeria	Neoproterozoic - Mesozoic	550 Ma		
Laurasia	Neoproterozoic - Mesozoic	550 Ma		
Cuyania	Paleozoic	~420-390 Ma		
Chilenia	Paleozoic	~420-390 Ma		
Pangaea	Paleozoic - Mesozoic	335 Ma		
Africa	Paleozoic - present	300 Ma		
South America	Mesozoic - present	225 Ma		
North America	Mesozoic - present	200 Ma		
Mauritia	Precambrian	70-60 Ma		
Asia	Mesozoic - present	66 Ma		
Australia	Cenozoic	10 Ma		
Europe	Cenozoic	5 Ma		
Pangaea Proxima		~250 myf		
Novopangaea		~250 myf		
Aurica		~250 myf		
Amasia		~250 myf		
