= Earth crust displacement =

Earth crustal displacement or Earth crust displacement may refer to:

- Plate tectonics, scientific theory which describes the large scale motions of Earth's crust (lithosphere).
- Fault (geology), fracture in Earth's crust where one side moves with respect to the other side.
- Supercontinent cycle, the quasi-periodic aggregation and dispersal of Earth's continental crust.
- Cataclysmic pole shift hypothesis, where the axis of rotation of a planet may have shifted or the crust may have shifted dramatically.
