= Paleohydrology =

Study of hydrology over geological time

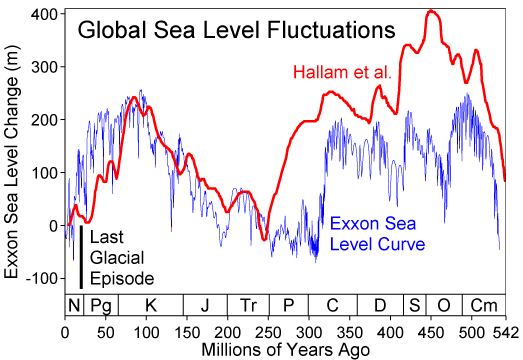
Comparison of two sea level reconstructions during the last 500 million years. The scale of change during the last glacial/interglacial transition is indicated with a black bar.

Paleohydrology, or palaeohydrology, is the scientific study of the movement, distribution, and quality of water on Earth during previous periods of its history. The discipline uses indirect evidence to infer changes in deposition rates, the existence of flooding, changes in sea levels, changes in groundwater levels and the erosion of rocks. It also deals with alterations in the floral and faunal assemblages which have come about in previous periods because of changes in hydrology.

== Background ==
Past hydrological changes on our planet have had enormous effects on the environment. Over most of geologic time, the long-term mean sea level has been higher than today. Only at the Permian-Triassic boundary ~250 million years ago was the long-term mean sea level lower than today. Long term changes in the mean sea level are the result of changes in the oceanic crust, with a downward trend expected to continue in the very long term. Twenty thousand years ago, the sea level was 120 m (394 ft) lower than at present with vast amounts of water being locked up as ice; in the northern hemisphere, there was twenty times more ice than the present volume.

The climate of the Sahara, for example, has undergone enormous variations between wet and dry over the last few hundred thousand years, believed to be caused by long-term changes in the North African climate cycle that alter the path of the North African Monsoon. Paleohydrological studies of sediments in the Fazzan Basin in Libya show that humid conditions once prevailed there that were capable of creating a lake with a surface area of around 76,250 km^{2} (29,400 mi^{2}). Before the abrupt desertification of North Africa about five thousand years ago, the Sahara was the home of Neolithic men and supported verdant vegetation and diverse wildlife.

== Methods ==
Paleohydrological study usually starts in the field with observations, measurements and the collection of samples; it continues with analysing the samples in the laboratory, recording the data, collating it, modelling systems, time-system analyses and eventually making inferences. A major step is the dating of the material. Methods here include using radioactive isotopes, considering the geological development of the area, the presence or absence of certain organisms and the identification of fossil pollen. Paleohydrology makes use of indirect methods that give an indication of the climatological conditions prevailing at the time.

== Applications ==
Hydrological fluctuations are linked to the factors causing them, and paleohydrological data can be used to validate climate models. On the orbital time scale, paleohydrological data reflects variations in the Earth's orbit and the cycle of glacial periods and interglacials. For example, variations in the water level of Lake Lisan correlate with data showing temperature fluctuations collected from polar ice core samples. On a shorter time scale, minuscule climatic variations can have large hydrological effects as when excess rainwater entering the North Atlantic was linked with a serious drought in the eastern Mediterranean. The Little Ice Age in northern Europe was linked with drought in East Africa, heavy rains in the African lakes, and persistent El Niño–Southern Oscillation conditions in the Pacific.

Another application is in the quantification of erosion caused by rivers under differing climatological conditions. Increased erosion rates following deforestation, and pollution resulting from lead-mining activities by the Romans show up in lake sediments.

== See also ==
- Paleoclimatology – Study of changes in ancient climate
- Paleoecology – Study of interactions between organisms and their environments across geologic timescales
- Palaeogeography – Study of physical geography of past landscapes
- Paleoceanography – Study of the oceans in the geologic past
- Paleontology – Study of past life through fossils Study of ancient life, often involving fossils and pollen (palynology).
- Paleomaps – maps showing the past shapes of continents
