= Paleomap =

Map of continents and mountain ranges in the past based on plate reconstructions

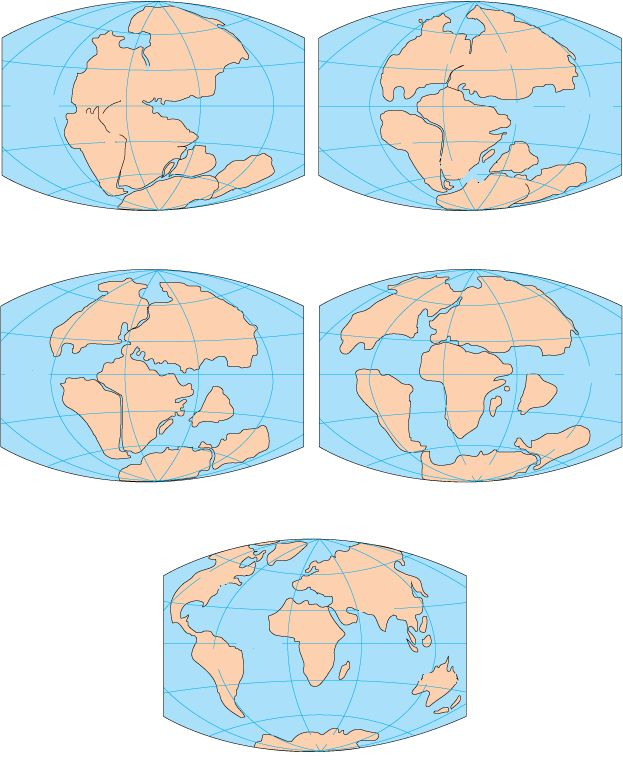
A series of paleomaps showing the breakup of Pangaea

Paleomaps (also called paleogeographic maps) are maps showing the past shapes of continents and mountain ranges based on plate reconstructions.

== History ==
Until the 1960s, paleomaps were not very accurate. Huge river deltas seemed to be associated with what must have been rather small drainage basins. With the discovery of plate tectonics, it became apparent that land masses move relative to one another over time. Paleomaps that account for plate tectonics were much more accurate.

== Modern paleomaps ==
Today’s maps are fairly accurate for continental positions over several hundred million years. Paleomaps representing eras predating the Cambrian Period are much less accurate, however, because fewer rock exposures have survived. Where rocks are exposed, latitudes can be determined from the orientation of preserved magnetic fields. Longitudes are based on projections that are increasingly uncertain as one gets further from the present.

Many published maps are associated in one way or another with the work of Christopher Scotese.

== See also ==
- Paleoceanography – Study of the oceans in the geologic past
- Paleohydrology – Study of hydrology over geological time
