= Galactic Tick Day =

Awareness and education day for the movement of the Solar System

- Observed by: international
- Type: Educational
- 2025 date: 5 June

Diagram of the Milky Way. The current position of the Solar System shown by an arrow.

Galactic Tick Day is an awareness and education day that celebrates the movement of the Solar System around the Milky Way galaxy.

The day occurs at a regular interval of 1.7361 years (or 633.7 days), which is called a galactic tick. The interval is derived from one centi-arcsecond of a galactic year, which is the Solar System's roughly 225-million-year trip around the Galactic Center. One galactic tick is only about 0.00000077 percent (1/[360 × 60 × 60 × 100]) of a full galactic year.

== Occurrences ==
The Galactic Tick Day was retroactively calculated to begin on the day Hans Lippershey filed the patent for the telescope on 2 October 1608. The first observance of the holiday was on 29 September 2016, the 235th Galactic Tick Day. Below is a list of further observances:

GTD number	Date	Ref
1st	2 October 1608	
235th	29 September 2016	
236th	26 June 2018	
237th	21 March 2020	
238th	15 December 2021	
239th	10 September 2023	
240th	5 June 2025	
241st	1 March 2027	
242nd	24 November 2028	
243rd	20 August 2030	

== See also ==
- Astronomical chronology
- Chronology
- Cosmic Calendar
