= Far future in religion =

Religious beliefs of far future

Discussions of the far future are of major importance both in theology and folk religion. Many Christian authors have welcomed the scientific theory of the heat death of the universe as the ultimate fate of the universe as it was first proposed, while atheists and materialists back then commonly opposed the theory in favour of the idea that the universe and life in it would exist eternally. Christian eschatology is in conflict with the idea that entropy will be the predominant factor in determining the state of the far future, instead predicting God's creation of the New Earth and its existence into the far future.

According to Mahayana Buddhism, an emanation of the Buddha-nature will appear in the material world in the far future.

In Hinduism, Brahma, the creator god, will live for 100 "years", with each day of these years made up of two kalpas, and each kalpa lasting 4.32 billion human years. The lifetime of Brahma, and thus the universe, is therefore predicted to last 315.36 trillion years.

Mayan religion often cites incredibly long time periods. Stela 1 at Coba marks the date of creation as 13.13.13.13.13.13.13.13.13.13.13.13.13.13.13.13.13.13.13.13.0.0.0.0 in the Mesoamerican Long Count. According to Linda Schele, these 13s represent "the starting point of a huge odometer of time", with each acting as a zero and resetting to 1 as the numbers increase. Thus this inscription anticipates the current universe lasting at least 20^{21}×13×360 days, or roughly 2.687×10^{28} years; a time span equal to 2 quintillion times the age of the universe as determined by cosmologists. Others have suggested, however, that this date marks creation as having occurred after that time span.

== See also ==
- Eschatology
- Far future in fiction
- Religious cosmology
- Timeline of the far future
