= Aurica (supercontinent) =

Possible future supercontinent

A video showing the assembly of Aurica.

Aurica is a possible future supercontinent configuration. It is one of the four proposed supercontinents that are speculated to form within 200 million years, the others being Pangaea Proxima, Amasia, and Novopangaea. The Aurica hypothesis was created in 2016 by scholars at the Geological Magazine following an American Geophysical Union study linking the strength of ocean tides to the supercontinent cycle. The name is a portmanteau of America and Australia, which form the core of the supercontinent. The study noted, "When tectonic plates slide, sink and shift the Earth's continents to form large landmasses, or supercontinents, ocean basins open and close in tandem. As these basins change shape, they can strike forms that amplify and intensify their tides."

== Formation ==
According to the Aurica hypothesis, both the Atlantic and the Pacific Oceans will close and be replaced by a new ocean. Duarte and colleagues hypothesize that a new rift (the Baikal Rift Zone) will develop in central Eurasia through Lake Baikal because of the gravitational collapse of the Himalayan Plateau, cutting from western India to the Arctic, which will split Eurasia into two, resulting in western Pakistan and Russia to split apart from China, India, and Mongolia. The Indian Ocean (or an ocean that could form within the East African Rift) and the Southern Ocean will expand into the rift.

The current northward motion of Australia and Antarctica will collide with South Korea, Japan, Indonesia, Peru, Mexico, the West Coast of the United States, and the Philippines respectively to close the Pacific, and Portugal and Morocco will collide with the East Coast of the United States between Florida and Maine. The Republic of Ireland and the United Kingdom will merge with Canada near their relative positions and part of Pangaea on the other side to close the Atlantic. That will result in Cuba and Brazil to be merged with Nigeria and South Africa. The Indian and Southern Oceans will merge into a new superocean surrounding the resultant supercontinent.

== Alternative scenarios ==
Paleogeologist Ronald Blakey has described the next 15 to 85 million years of tectonic development as fairly settled and predictable, without supercontinent formation. Beyond that, he cautions that the geologic record is full of unexpected shifts in tectonic activity that make further projections "very, very speculative." Three hypothetical supercontinents—"Amasia", Christopher Scotese's "Pangaea Proxima", and Roy Livermore's "Novopangaea"—were illustrated in an October 2007 New Scientist article.
