= Novopangaea =

Possible future supercontinent

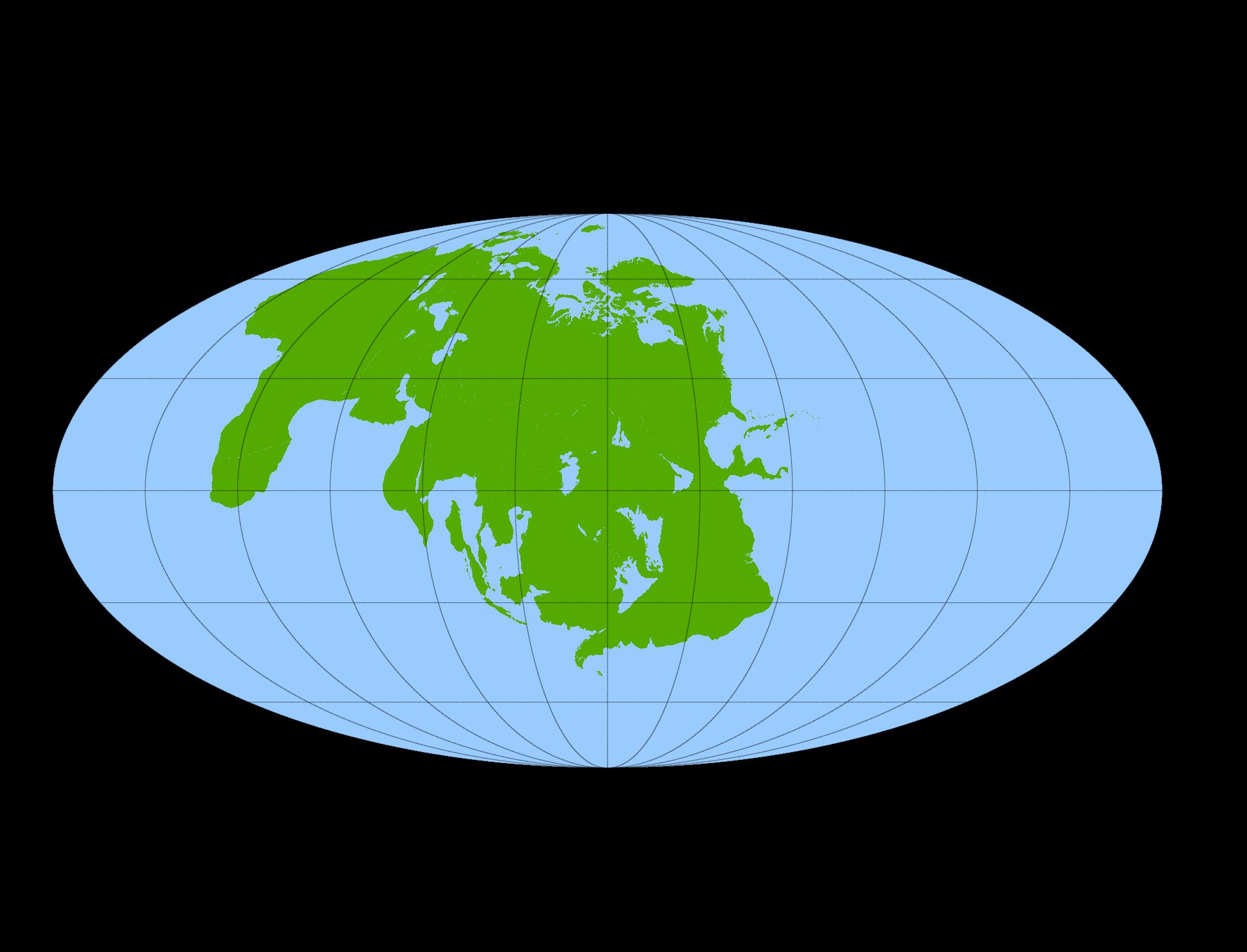
Hypothetical map of Novopangaea, 200 million years in the future

Novopangaea or Novopangea (Greco-Latin for "New Pangaea") is a possible future supercontinent postulated by Roy Livermore in the late 1990s. It assumes closure of the Pacific, docking of Australia with East Asia and North America, and northward motion of Antarctica.

== Alternative scenarios ==
Paleogeologist Ronald Blakey has described the next 15 to 100 million years of tectonic development as fairly settled and predictable but no supercontinent will form in that time frame. Beyond that, he cautions that the geologic record is full of unexpected shifts in tectonic activity that make further projections "very, very speculative". In addition to Novopangaea, two other hypothetical supercontinents—"Amasia" and Christopher Scotese's "Pangaea Proxima"—were illustrated in an October 2007 New Scientist article. Another supercontinent prediction, Aurica, has been proposed in more recent times and suggests the closure of both the Atlantic and the Pacific Oceans.

Research by Masaki Yoshida and Madhava Santosh in August 2011 suggests that the presence of relatively hot large low-shear-velocity provinces below Africa and the Pacific preventing convergent plate tectonics might prevent South America from being able to cross the Pacific as suggested by the Novopangaea model, with it rather staying close to its current position relative to North America, and might prevent Antarctica from leaving the South Pole as suggested. Therefore, they suggest that while Eurasia, Africa, Australia, and North America may merge as suggested, South America and Antarctica will remain separate from the resultant supercontinent by an only partially closed Pacific Ocean.
