= Andromeda–Milky Way collision =

Postulated future astronomical event

The Andromeda–Milky Way collision is a galactic collision that may occur in about 4.5 billion years between the two largest galaxies in the Local Group—the Milky Way (which contains the Solar System and Earth) and the Andromeda Galaxy.

The stars involved are sufficiently spaced that it is improbable that any of them would individually collide, though some stars may be ejected.

== Questions about certainty ==
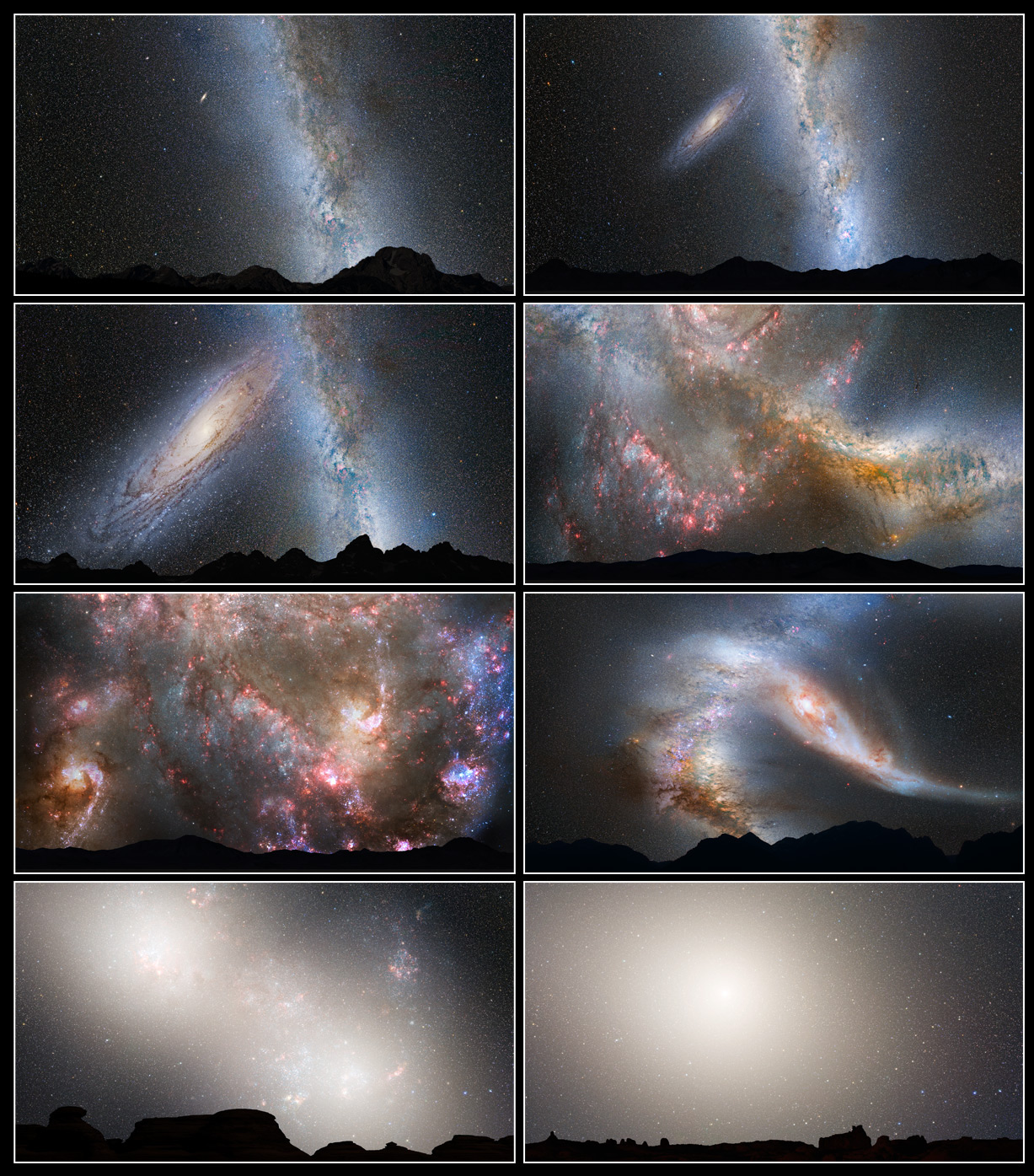
This series of photo illustrations shows a possible predicted merger between the Milky Way Galaxy and the neighboring Andromeda Galaxy.

The Andromeda Galaxy is approaching the Milky Way at about 110 kilometres per second (68.4 mi/s) as indicated by blueshift. However, the lateral speed (measured as proper motion) is very difficult to measure with sufficient precision to draw reasonable conclusions. By 2012, it appeared to be that a collision with the two galaxies was highly likely. Studies at the time showed Andromeda is moving southeast in the sky at less than 0.1 milliarc-seconds per year, corresponding to a speed relative to the Sun of less than 200 km/s towards the south and towards the east. Taking also into account the Sun's motion, Andromeda's tangential or sideways velocity with respect to the Milky Way was found to be much smaller than the speed of approach (consistent with zero given the uncertainty) and therefore it would eventually merge with the Milky Way in around five billion years.

Additional reasoning stated that such collisions are relatively common, considering galaxies' long lifespans. Andromeda, for example, is believed to have collided with at least one other galaxy in the past, and several dwarf galaxies such as Sagittarius Dwarf Spheroidal Galaxy are currently colliding with the Milky Way and being merged into it.

The certainty, as well as the timescale for such a collision, have since been questioned. In 2025, Till Sawala and colleagues found that, with data gathered from the Gaia spacecraft and Hubble telescope which was not available in 2012, the chance for a collision is much lower. Astronomers considered 22 different variables which could affect the potential collision between the Milky Way and Andromeda galaxies and ran 100,000 simulations based on these variables known as Monte Carlo Simulations. These simulations showed that the chances of a head-on collision between the two galaxies is only 50% within the next 10 billion years.

The simulated scenarios show that half the time the two galaxies fly past each other with roughly half a million lightyears worth of space between them and move into a gradual orbital decay by a process known as dynamical friction. In the other half of scenarios, the two galaxies don't even come close to one another, and when the gravitational pulls from both the Large Magellanic Cloud and the Triangulum Galaxy (also known as M33) are taken into account, there is only a 2% chance of a head-on collision in the next 4 to 5 billion years.

== Stellar collisions ==
A NASA conception of the collision using computer-generated imagery

While the Andromeda Galaxy contains about 1 trillion (10^{12}) stars and the Milky Way about 300 billion (3×10^{11}), the chance of even two stars colliding is negligible because of the huge distances between the stars. For example, the nearest star to the Earth after the Sun is Proxima Centauri, about 4.2 light-years (4.0×10^{13} km; 2.5×10^{13} mi) or 30 million (3×10^{7}) solar diameters away. To visualize that scale, if the Sun were a ping-pong ball, Proxima Centauri would be a pea about 1,100 km (680 mi) away, and the Milky Way would be about 30 million km (19 million mi) wide. Although stars are more common near the centers of each galaxy, the average distance between stars is still 160 billion (1.6×10^{11}) km (100 billion mi, 1075 AU). That is analogous to one ping-pong ball every 3.2 km (2 mi). Thus, it is considered extremely unlikely that any two stars from the merging galaxies would collide.

== Black hole collisions ==
The Milky Way and Andromeda galaxies each contain a central supermassive black hole (SMBH), these being Sagittarius A* (c. 3.6×10^{6} M_{☉}) and an object within the P2 concentration of Andromeda's nucleus (1–2×10^{8} M_{☉}). These black holes would converge near the centre of the newly formed galaxy over a period that may take millions of years, due to a process known as dynamical friction: as the SMBHs move relative to the surrounding cloud of much less massive stars, gravitational interactions lead to a net transfer of orbital energy from the SMBHs to the stars, causing the stars to be "slingshotted" into higher-radius orbits, and the SMBHs to "sink" toward the galactic core. When the SMBHs come within one light-year of one another, they would begin to strongly emit gravitational waves that would radiate further orbital energy until they merge completely. Gas taken up by the combined black hole could create a luminous quasar or an active galactic nucleus, releasing as much energy as 100 million supernova explosions. As of 2006, simulations indicated that the Sun might be brought near the centre of the combined galaxy, potentially coming near one of the black holes before being ejected entirely out of the galaxy.

== Fate of the Solar System ==
Based on data available in 2007, two scientists with the Harvard–Smithsonian Center for Astrophysics predict a 50% chance that in a merged galaxy, the Solar System will be swept out three times farther from the galactic core than its current distance. They also predict a 12% chance that the Solar System will be ejected from the new galaxy sometime during the collision. Such an event would have no adverse effect on the system and the chances of any sort of disturbance to the Sun or planets themselves may be remote.

Excluding planetary engineering, by the time the two galaxies may collide, the surface of the Earth will have already become far too hot for liquid water to exist, ending all terrestrial life; that is currently estimated to occur in about 0.5 to 1.5 billion years due to gradually increasing luminosity of the Sun; by the time of the collision, the Sun's luminosity will have risen by 35–40%, likely initiating a runaway greenhouse effect on the planet by this time.

== Possible triggered stellar events ==
When two spiral galaxies collide, the hydrogen present on their disks is compressed, producing strong star formation as can be seen on interacting systems like the Antennae Galaxies. In the case of the Andromeda–Milky Way collision, it is believed that there will be little gas remaining in the disks of both galaxies, so the mentioned starburst will be relatively weak, though it still may be enough to form a quasar.

== Merger remnant ==
The hypothetical galaxy product of the collision has been named Milkomeda or Milkdromeda. According to simulations, this object would probably be a giant elliptical galaxy, but with a centre showing less stellar density than current elliptical galaxies. It is, however, possible the resulting object would be a large lenticular or super spiral galaxy, depending on the amount of remaining gas in the Milky Way and Andromeda.

Over the course of the next 150 billion years, the remaining galaxies of the Local Group will coalesce into this object, effectively completing its evolution.

== See also ==
- NGC 2207 and IC 2163
- Mayall's Object
- Ultimate fate of the universe
