= Pangaea Proxima =

Hypothetical future supercontinent

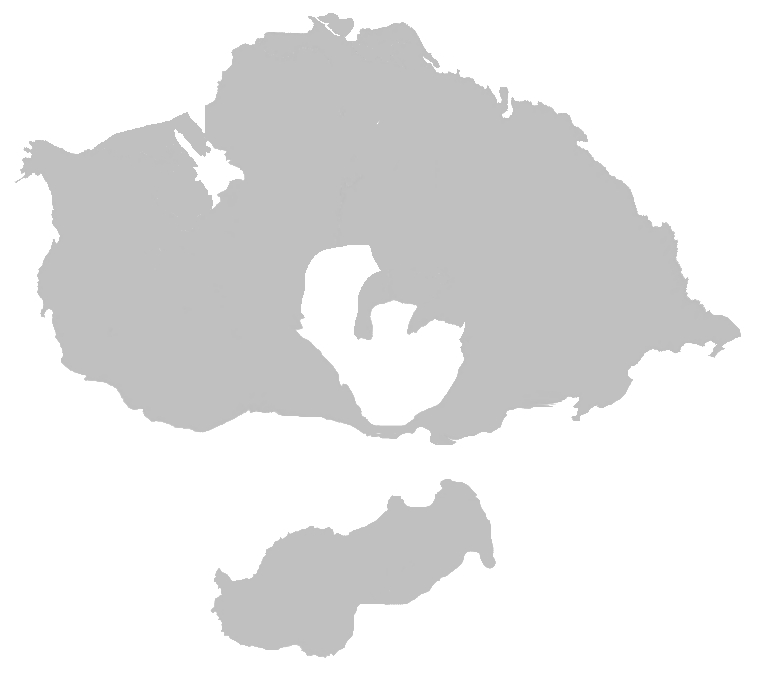
- A rough approximation of Pangaea Proxima according to the early model on the Paleomap Project website. The central sea is the "Medi-Pangaean Sea". The newer model has Australia and Antarctica between South America and southeast Asia, south of the Medi-Pangaean Sea.

Pangaea Proxima (also called Pangaea Ultima, Neopangaea, and Pangaea II) is a possible future supercontinent configuration. In keeping with the supercontinent cycle, Pangaea Proxima could form within the next 250 million years. This potential configuration, hypothesized by Christopher Scotese in November 1982, earned its name from its similarity to the ancient Pangaea supercontinent. Scotese later changed the name of Pangaea Ultima (Last Pangaea) to Pangaea Proxima (Next Pangaea) because the name Ultima could imply that it would be the last-ever supercontinent. The model was derived from extrapolation of past cycles of formation and breakup of supercontinents, not from theoretical understanding of the mechanisms of tectonic change, which are too imprecise to be projected that far into the future. "It's all pretty much fantasy to start with," Scotese has said. "But it's a fun exercise to think about what might happen. And you can only do it if you have a really clear idea of why things happen in the first place."

Supercontinents describe the merger of all or nearly all of Earth's landmass into a single contiguous continent. In the Pangaea Proxima scenario, subduction at the western Atlantic, east of the Americas, leads to the subduction of the Atlantic mid-ocean ridge, followed by subduction destroying the Atlantic and Indian basin, causing the Atlantic and the Indian Oceans to close, and bringing the Americas back together with Africa and Europe. As with most other supercontinents, the interior areas of Pangaea Proxima are presumed to become semi-arid or desert regions, which will be prone to extreme temperatures up to 55 °C (131 °F). Most land mammals, including the descendants of humans, may be driven to extinction (as were many orders of terrestrial vertebrates during the Permian–Triassic extinction event) because of these environments.

== Formation ==
According to the Pangaea Proxima hypothesis, the Atlantic and the Indian Oceans will continue to get wider until new subduction zones bring the continents back together and form a future Pangaea. Most continents and microcontinents are predicted to collide with Eurasia, just as when most continents collided with Laurentia.

In the next 50 million years (assuming no new subduction zones come into being before then), North America is predicted to shift west and Eurasia east and possibly even to the south and bring Great Britain closer to the North Pole and Siberia southward towards warm, subtropical latitudes. Africa is predicted to collide with Europe and Arabia, closing the Mediterranean Sea (thus completely closing the Tethys Ocean (or Neotethys)) and the Red Sea between Sudan and Saudi Arabia, and the Persian Gulf will be closed off resulting in Iran to become a landlocked country. A long mountain range (the Mediterranean Mountain Range) would then extend from Iberia, across Southern Europe and into Asia. Some are even predicted to have peaks higher than Mount Everest between Spain, Greece, Italy, and Egypt. Similarly, Australia is predicted to beach itself past the doorstep of Southeast Asia, causing islands such as the Philippines and Indonesia to be compressed inland, forming another potential mountain range while Japan will collide with China, Korea, and Russia. Meanwhile, Southern and Baja California are predicted to have already collided with Alaska, with new mountain ranges formed between the United States and Canada.

About 125 million years from now, the Atlantic Ocean is predicted to stop widening and to begin to shrink, as the Mid-Atlantic Ridge seafloor spreading gives way to subduction. In this scenario, the mid-ocean ridge between South America and Africa will probably be subducted first; the Atlantic Ocean is predicted to narrow as a result of subduction beneath the Americas. The Indian Ocean is also predicted to be smaller due to northward subduction of oceanic crust into the Central Indian trench. Antarctica is expected to split into two and shift northwards, colliding with Madagascar and Australia, enclosing a remnant of the Indian Ocean, which Scotese calls the "Medi-Pangaean Sea."

When the last of the Mid-Atlantic Ridge is subducted beneath the Americas, the Atlantic Ocean is predicted to close rapidly. Research by Duarte et al in 2024 is consistent with this by noting that the Gibraltar Arc may evolve into a subduction zone entering the Atlantic Ocean and forming an Atlantic analogue to the current Ring of Fire, which would lead to the closure of the Atlantic Ocean.

At 250 million years in the future, the Atlantic is predicted to have closed, with only small vestiges of the former ocean remaining. North America will have collided with Africa but be in a more southerly position than where it rifted away. South America is predicted to be wrapped around the southern tip of Africa and Antarctica and to completely enclose the Medi-Pangaean Sea. The supercontinent will be encircled by a global ocean, the Neopanthalassan Ocean (meaning "new" Panthalassan Ocean), which encircles half the Earth. The Earth is expected to have a hothouse climate with an average global temperature of 28 °C (82 °F). The only areas likely to be habitable for land mammals are those closest to the poles.

== Effects ==
The formation of Pangaea Proxima will probably dramatically affect the environment. The collision of plates will result in mountain building, thereby shifting weather patterns. The sea level may drop because of increased glaciation. The rate of surface weathering may rise, increasing the rate at which organic material is buried. Pangaea Proxima also has the potential to lower global temperatures and increase atmospheric oxygen. That, in turn, may affect the climate by further lowering global temperatures. The changes as described above can result in more rapid biological evolution, as new niches emerge. It has been suggested that the rise in pCO_{2} and the increased continentality that would accompany the assembly of Pangaea Proxima will result in climatic extremes intense enough to bring about the mass extinction of mammals.

Pangaea Proxima could also insulate the mantle. The flow of heat will be concentrated, resulting in volcanism and the flooding of large areas with basalt. Rifts will form, and Pangaea Proxima will split up once more in 400 to 500 million years. Earth may thereafter experience a warming period as occurred during the Cretaceous period, which marked the split-up of the previous Pangaea supercontinent.

== Models ==
There are two models for the formation of Pangaea Proxima: an early model and the current model. The two models differ in where they place Australia, Antarctica, and Chukotka.

The early model, created in 1982 and shown on the Paleomap Project website, places Australia and Antarctica connected to each other as a separate landmass to Pangaea Proxima, close to the South Pole, and Chukotka staying with Eurasia.

The current model, created in 2001 and shown on Scotese's YouTube channel, has Australia attached to China, East Antarctica attached to South America, and West Antarctica attached to Australia, with Chukotka and the Kamchatka Peninsula attached to North America (Chukotka is on the North American plate. The Kamchatka Peninsula could either lie on the North American plate or be part of a separate Okhotsk microplate).

== Other suggested future supercontinents ==
Paleogeologist Ronald Blakey has described predictions of the next 15 to 85 million years of tectonic development as fairly settled, without supercontinent formation. Beyond that, he cautions that the geologic record is full of unexpected shifts in tectonic activity driven by currents deep in the Earth's mantle, which are largely undetectable and poorly understood, which makes longer projections "very, very speculative." In addition to Pangaea Proxima, two other hypothetical supercontinents—"Amasia" and "Novopangaea"—were illustrated in an October 2007 New Scientist article. Another supercontinent, Aurica, has been suggested in an article published in 2016.

Research from Curtin University in Australia and Peking University in China published in 2022 supports an Amasia scenario within 200 to 300 million years. The study in the National Science Review suggests that the Pacific Ocean, shrinking since the time of the dinosaurs, may continue until it has closed entirely, resulting in the collision of the Americas with Eurasia.

== In popular culture ==
The planet PNF-404 in Pikmin 3 is based on a version of Pangaea Proxima.
