= Amasia (supercontinent) =

Possible future supercontinent

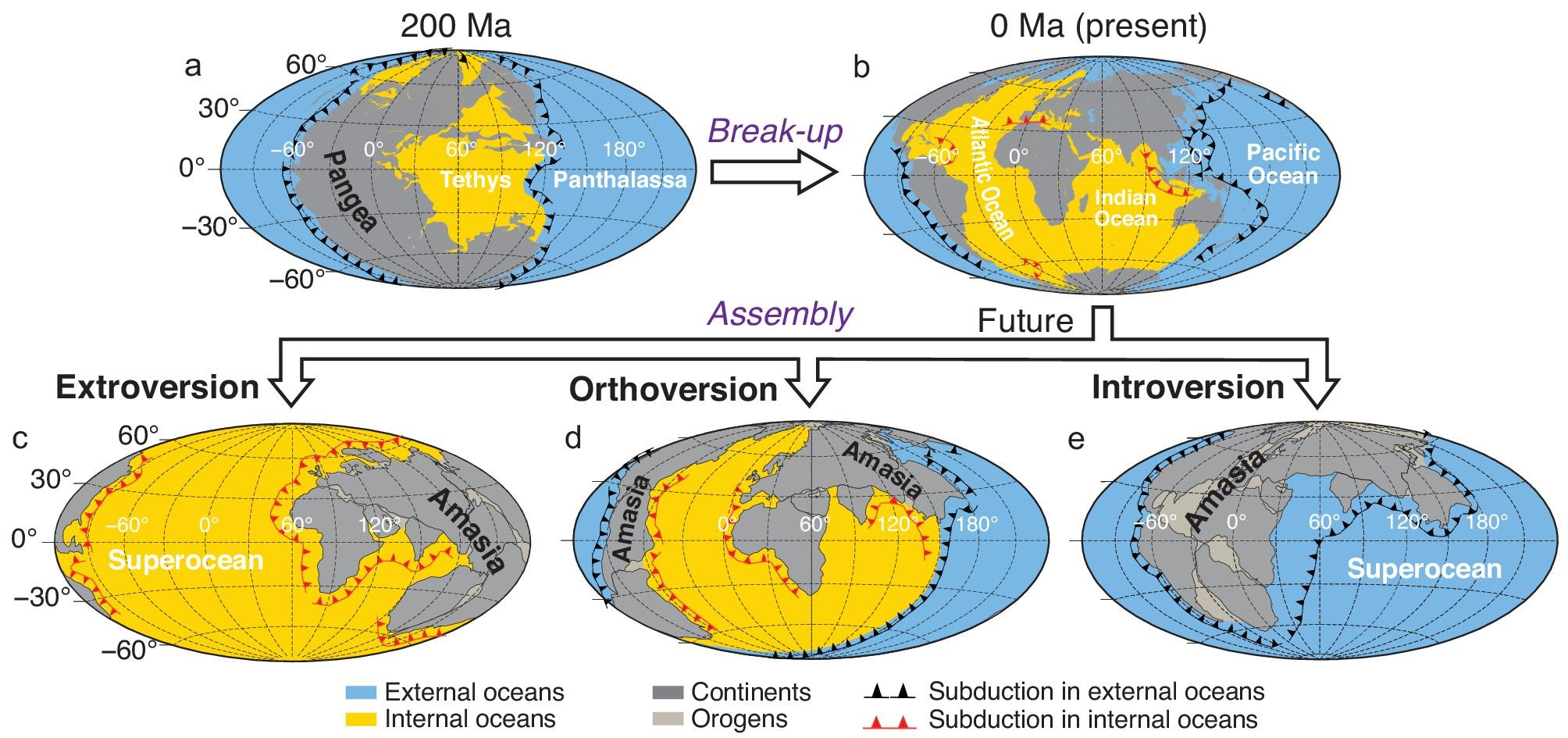
Three possible scenarios for Amasia. The canonical scenario would look like the one on the left.

Amasia is a possible future supercontinent that could be formed by the merger of Asia, Australia, and the Americas. The prediction relies mostly on the fact that the Pacific plate is already subducting under Eurasia and the Americas; if continued, the process will eventually cause the Pacific to close. Meanwhile, because of the Atlantic mid-ocean ridge, North America would be pushed westward. Thus, the Atlantic at some point in the future would be larger than the Pacific. The combination of those factors would cause the Americas to be combined with Asia, thus forming a supercontinent.

== Origin ==
The name was originally coined by Paul F. Hoffman at Harvard University in reference to a 1992 model by Chris Hartnady at the University of Cape Town in which Antarctica will stay put at the South Pole, and the other continents coalesce around Asia and Australia in the northern temperate latitudes around 250 million years from now. A February 2012 study predicts that Amasia will form over the North Pole in about 50 to 200 million years and close the Arctic Ocean. A 2022 model suggests that it might take as much as 600 million years for Amasia to form as the Pacific closes and that much of the detail of how and how fast the continents move would depend on the strength of the oceanic lithosphere.

== Alternative scenarios ==
Paleogeologist Ronald Blakey has described future tectonic development up to between 75 and 100 million years from now as fairly settled and predictable but no supercontinent will form in that time frame. Beyond that, he cautions that the geologic record is full of unexpected shifts in the tectonic activity that make further projections "really, really speculative." In addition to Amasia, two other hypothetical supercontinents—Christopher Scotese's "Pangaea Proxima" and Roy Livermore's "Novopangaea"—were illustrated in an October 2007 New Scientist article. Another supercontinent, Aurica, has been proposed in more recent times.
