= Christopher Scotese =

American geologist and paleogeographer (born 1953)

Christopher R. Scotese
- Born: May 4, 1953 (age 73); Chicago, Illinois
- Education: University of Chicago
- Scientific career
- Fields: Geology, paleogeography
- Workplaces: Northwestern University, Evanston, Illinois, US

Christopher R. Scotese (born May 4, 1953) is an American geologist and paleogeographer. He received his PhD from the University of Chicago in 1985. He is the creator of the Paleomap Project, which aims to map Earth over the last billion years, and is credited with predicting Pangaea Ultima, a possible future supercontinent configuration. Later Scotese changed Pangaea Ultima to Pangaea Proxima to alleviate confusion about the name Pangaea Ultima, which would imply that it would be the last supercontinent.

On December 22, 2010, he created a YouTube channel about the geography of earth in the future and past.

Scotese retired from teaching at the University of Texas, Arlington, Department of Earth and Environmental Sciences in 2013. He is now a research associate at the Field Museum of Natural History and an adjunct professor in the Department of Earth and Environmental Sciences, Northwestern University. He continues to collaborate with several research groups on topics concerning the history of the Earth System, but his main focus is a book entitled Earth History, the Evolution of the Earth System. He is the coauthor of more than 100 scientific publications, and his maps and animations have been used in numerous geological textbooks, scientific research papers, and museum displays worldwide.

== Selected publications ==
- Cao, Wenchao; Williams, Simon; Flament, Nicolas; Zahirovic, Sabin; Scotese, Christopher; Müller, R. Dietmar (March 12, 2018). "Palaeolatitudinal distribution of lithologic indicators of climate in a palaeogeographic framework". Geological Magazine. 156 (2). Cambridge University Press (CUP): 331–354. doi:10.1017/s0016756818000110. ISSN 0016-7568. S2CID 134349632.
- Chatterjee, S., Scotese, C.R., Bajpai, S., 2017. The Restless Indian Plate and Its Epic Voyage from Gondwana to Asia: Its Tectonic, Paleoclimate, and Paleobiogeographic Evolution, Geological Society of America, Special Paper 529, 147 pp.
- Lehtonen, Samuli; Silvestro, Daniele; Karger, Dirk Nikolaus; Scotese, Christopher; Tuomisto, Hanna; Kessler, Michael; Peña, Carlos; Wahlberg, Niklas; Antonelli, Alexandre (July 6, 2017). "Environmentally driven extinction and opportunistic origination explain fern diversification patterns". Scientific Reports. 7 (1). Springer Science and Business Media LLC: 4831. Bibcode:2017NatSR...7.4831L. doi:10.1038/s41598-017-05263-7. ISSN 2045-2322. PMC 5500532. PMID 28684788.
- Mills, Benjamin J. W.; Scotese, Christopher R.; Walding, Nicholas G.; Shields, Graham A.; Lenton, Timothy M. (October 24, 2017). "Elevated CO2 degassing rates prevented the return of Snowball Earth during the Phanerozoic". Nature Communications. 8 (1). Springer Science and Business Media LLC: 1110. Bibcode:2017NatCo...8.1110M. doi:10.1038/s41467-017-01456-w. ISSN 2041-1723. PMC 5736558. PMID 29062095.
- Scotese, C.R., and Schettino, A., 2017. Late Permian – Early Jurassic Paleogeography of Western Tethys and the World, Chapter 3, in Permo-Triassic Salt Provinces of Europe, North Africa and the Atlantic Margins, Elsevier, p. 57 – 95,
- Upchurch, Garland R.; Kiehl, Jeffrey; Shields, Christine; Scherer, Jacquelyn; Scotese, Christopher (June 23, 2015). "Latitudinal temperature gradients and high-latitude temperatures during the latest Cretaceous: Congruence of geologic data and climate models". Geology. 43 (8). Geological Society of America: 683–686. Bibcode:2015Geo....43..683U. doi:10.1130/g36802.1. ISSN 0091-7613.
- Osen, Angela K.; Winguth, Arne M.E.; Winguth, Cornelia; Scotese, Christopher R. (2013). "Sensitivity of Late Permian climate to bathymetric features and implications for the mass extinction". Global and Planetary Change. 105. Elsevier BV: 171–179. Bibcode:2013GPC...105..171O. doi:10.1016/j.gloplacha.2012.01.011. ISSN 0921-8181.
- Chatterjee, Sankar; Goswami, Arghya; Scotese, Christopher R. (2013). "The longest voyage: Tectonic, magmatic, and paleoclimatic evolution of the Indian plate during its northward flight from Gondwana to Asia". Gondwana Research. 23 (1). Elsevier BV: 238–267. Bibcode:2013GondR..23..238C. doi:10.1016/j.gr.2012.07.001. ISSN 1342-937X.
- Boucot, A. J. (2013). Phanerozoic paleoclimate : an atlas of lithologic indicators of climate. Tulsa, Okla: Society for Sedimentary Geology. ISBN 978-1-56576-282-4. OCLC 876431965.
