= Supercontinent cycle =

Repeated joining and separation of Earth's continents

Columbia/Nuna c. 1.6 billion years ago

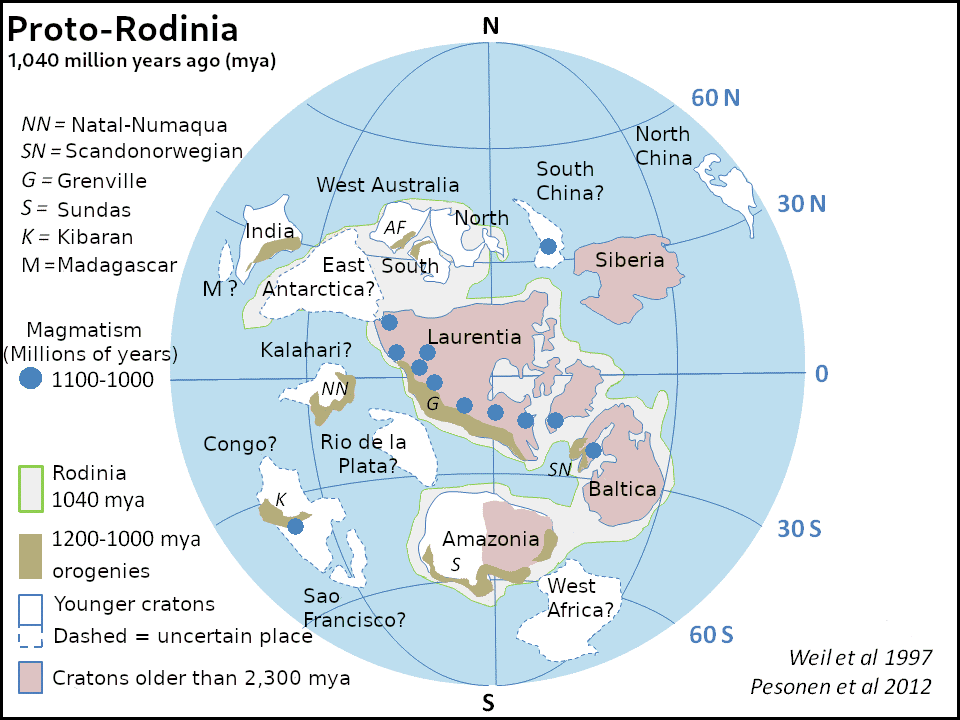
Rodinia c. 1 billion years ago

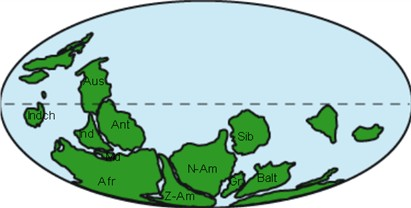
Pannotia c. 600 million years ago

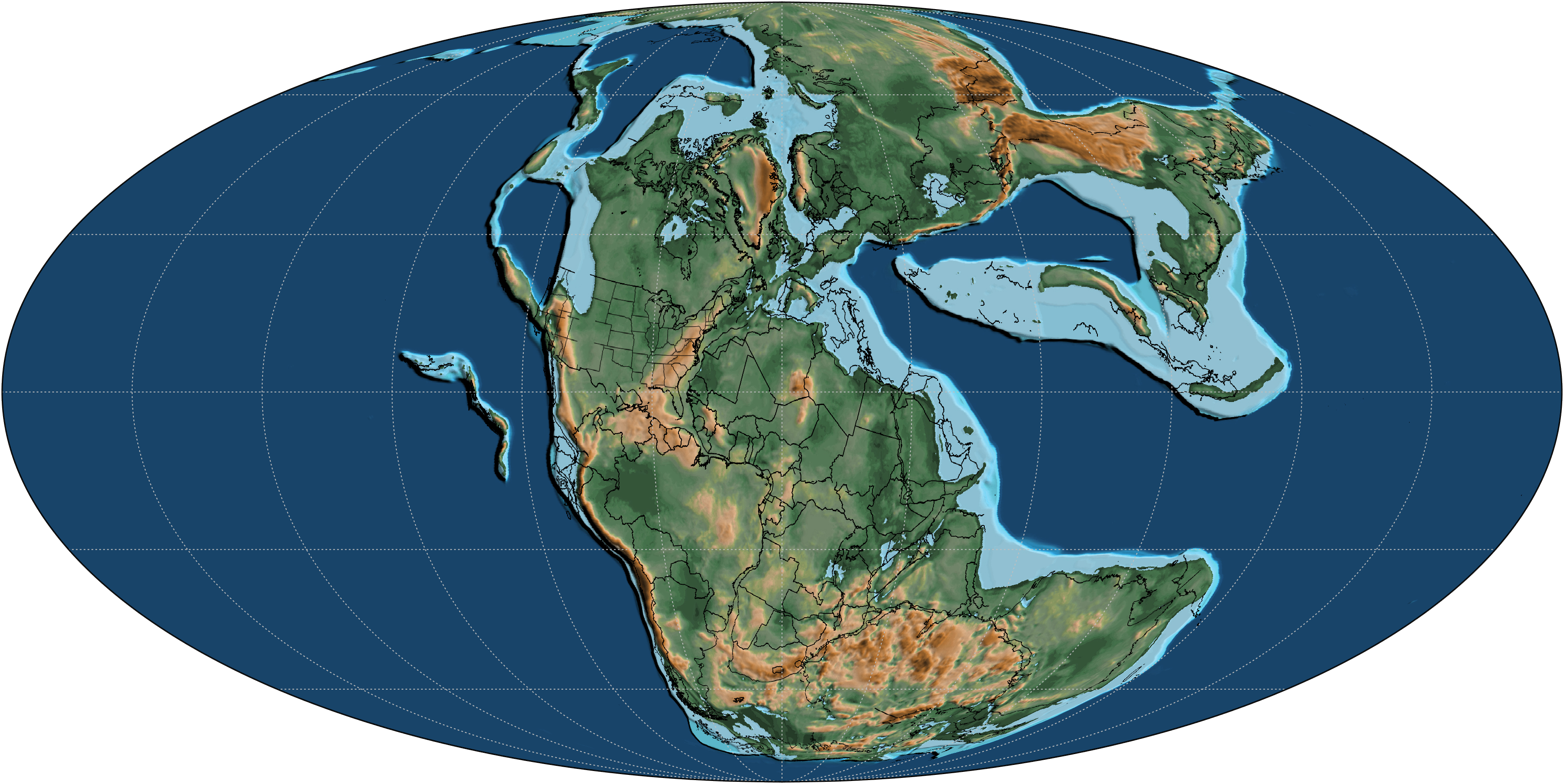
Pangaea c. 225 million years ago

The supercontinent cycle is the quasi-periodic aggregation and dispersal of Earth's continental crust. There are varying opinions as to whether the amount of continental crust is increasing, decreasing, or staying about the same, but it is agreed that the Earth's crust is constantly being reconfigured. One complete supercontinent cycle is said to take 300 to 500 million years. Continental collision makes fewer and larger continents while rifting makes more and smaller continents.

== Theory ==

The most recent supercontinent, Pangaea, formed about 300 million years ago (0.3 Ga), during the Paleozoic era. There are two different views on the history of earlier supercontinents.

=== Series ===
The first theory proposes a series of supercontinents: starting with Vaalbara (3.6 to 2.8 Ga); Ur (c. 3 Ga); Kenorland (2.7 to 2.1 Ga); Columbia (1.8 to 1.5 Ga); Rodinia (1.25 Ga to 750 Ma); and Pannotia (c. 600 Ma), whose dispersal produced the continents that ultimately collided to form Pangaea.

The kinds of minerals found inside ancient diamonds suggest that the cycle of supercontinental formation and breakup began roughly 3 Ga. Before 3.2 Ga, only diamonds with peridotitic compositions (commonly found in the Earth's mantle) formed, whereas after 3.0 Ga eclogitic diamonds (rocks from the Earth's crust) became prevalent. This change is thought to have come about as subduction and continental collision introduced eclogite into subcontinental diamond-forming fluids.

The supercontinent cycle and the Wilson cycle produced the supercontinents Rodinia and Pangaea

The hypothesized supercontinent cycle is concurrent with the shorter-term Wilson Cycle named after plate tectonics pioneer John Tuzo Wilson, which describes the periodic opening and closing of oceanic basins from a single plate rift. The oldest seafloor material found today dates to 170 Ma, whereas the oldest continental crust material found today dates to 4 Ga, showing the relative brevity of the regional Wilson cycles compared to the whole-planetary pulses seen in the arrangement of the continents.

=== Protopangea–Paleopangea ===
The second view, based on both palaeomagnetic and geological evidence, is that supercontinent cycles did not occur before about 0.6 Ga (during the Ediacaran period). Instead, the continental crust comprised a single supercontinent from about 2.7 Ga until it broke up for the first time, somewhere around 0.6 Ga. This reconstruction is based on the observation that if only small peripheral modifications are made to the primary reconstruction, the data show that the palaeomagnetic poles converged to quasi-static positions for long intervals between about 2.7–2.2 Ga; 1.5–1.25 Ga; and 0.75–0.6 Ga. During the intervening periods, the poles appear to have conformed to a unified apparent polar wander path.

The paleomagnetic data are adequately explained by the existence of a single Protopangea–Paleopangea supercontinent with prolonged quasi-integrity. The prolonged duration of this supercontinent could be explained by the operation of lid tectonics (comparable to the tectonics operating on Mars and Venus) during Precambrian times, as opposed to the plate tectonics seen on the contemporary Earth. However, this approach is widely criticized as an incorrect application of paleomagnetic data.

== Effects on sea level ==
It is known that sea level is generally low when the continents are together and high when they are apart. For example, sea level was low at the time of formation of Pangaea (Permian) and Pannotia (latest Neoproterozoic), and rose rapidly to maxima during Ordovician and Cretaceous times, when the continents were dispersed.

Major influences on sea level during the break up of supercontinents include: oceanic crust age, lost back-arc basins, marine sediment depths, emplacement of large igneous provinces, and the effect of passive margin extension. Of these, oceanic crust age, and marine sediment depths seem to play some of the largest roles in creating a sea level model. The addition of the other controlling parameters help stabilize models when data is sparse.

The age of the oceanic lithosphere provides a first order control on the depth of the ocean basins, and therefore on global sea level. Oceanic lithosphere forms at mid-ocean ridges and moves outwards, conductively cooling and shrinking, which decreases the thickness and increases the density of the oceanic lithosphere, and lowers the seafloor away from mid-ocean ridges. For oceanic lithosphere that is less than about 75 Ma, a simple cooling half-space model of conductive cooling works, in which the depth of the ocean basins d in areas in which there is no nearby subduction is a function of the age of the oceanic lithosphere t. In general,

$$d(t) = \frac{2}{\sqrt{\pi}} a_{\rm eff} T_1 \sqrt{\kappa t} + d_{\rm r}$$

where κ is the thermal diffusivity of the mantle lithosphere (c. 8×10^{−7} m^{2}/s), a_{eff} is the effective thermal expansion coefficient for rock (c. 5.7×10^{−5} °C^{−1}), T_{1} is the temperature of ascending magma compared to the temperature at the upper boundary (c. 1220 °C for the Atlantic and Indian Oceans, c. 1120 °C for the eastern Pacific) and d_{r} is the depth of the ridge below the ocean surface. After plugging in rough numbers for the sea floor, the equation becomes:

for the eastern Pacific Ocean:
$$d(t) = 350 \sqrt{t} + 2500$$

and for the Atlantic and Indian Oceans:

$$d(t) = 390 \sqrt{t} + 2500$$

where d is in meters and t is in millions of years, so that recently formed crust at the mid-ocean ridges lies at about 2,500 m depth, whereas 50-million-year-old seafloor lies at a depth of about 5,000 m. As the mean level of the sea floor decreases, the volume of the ocean basins increases, and if other factors that can control sea level remain constant, sea level falls. The converse is also true: younger oceanic lithosphere leads to shallower oceans and higher sea levels if other factors remain constant.

The surface area of the oceans can change when continents rift (stretching the continents decreases ocean area and raises sea level) or as a result of continental collision (compressing the continents increases ocean area and lowers sea level). Increasing sea level will flood the continents, while decreasing sea level will expose continental shelves. Because the continental shelf has a very low slope, a small increase in sea level will result in a large change in the percent of continents flooded.

If the world ocean on average is young, the seafloor will be relatively shallow, and sea level will be high: more of the continents are flooded. If the world ocean is on average old, seafloor will be relatively deep, and sea level will be low: more of the continents will be exposed. There is thus a relatively simple relationship between the supercontinent cycle and the mean age of the seafloor.

- Supercontinent = older seafloor = lower sea level
- Dispersed continents = younger seafloor = higher sea level

There will also be a climatic effect of the supercontinent cycle that will amplify this further:

- Supercontinent = continental climate dominant = continental glaciation likely = still lower sea level
- Dispersed continents = maritime climate dominant = continental glaciation unlikely = sea level is not lowered by this mechanism

== Relation to global tectonics ==
There is a progression of tectonic regimes that accompanies the supercontinent cycle:

During break-up of the supercontinent, rifting environments dominate. This is followed by passive margin environments, while seafloor spreading continues and the oceans grow. This in turn is followed by the development of collisional environments that become increasingly important with time. First collisions are between continents and island arcs, but lead ultimately to continent-continent collisions. This was the situation during the Paleozoic supercontinent cycle; it is being observed for the Mesozoic–Cenozoic supercontinent cycle, still in progress.

== Relation to climate ==
There are two types of global earth climates: icehouse and greenhouse. Icehouse is characterized by frequent continental glaciations and severe desert environments. Greenhouse is characterized by warm climates. Both reflect the supercontinent cycle. The Earth is currently in a short greenhouse phase of an icehouse climate. Periods of icehouse climate include much of the Neoproterozoic, late Paleozoic, late Cenozoic, while periods of greenhouse climate include early Paleozoic, Mesozoic–early Cenozoic.

- Icehouse climate
  - Continents moving together
  - Sea level low due to lack of seafloor production
  - Climate cooler, arid
  - Associated with aragonite seas
  - Formation of supercontinents
- Greenhouse climate
  - Continents dispersed
  - Sea level high
  - High level of seafloor spreading
  - Relatively large amounts of CO_{2} production at oceanic rifting zones
  - Climate warm and humid
  - Associated with calcite seas

== Relation to evolution ==
The principal mechanism for evolution is natural selection among diverse populations. Diversity, as measured by the number of families, follows the supercontinent cycle very well. As genetic drift occurs more frequently in small populations, diversity is an observed consequence of geographic isolation. Less isolation, and thus less diversification, occurs when the continents are all together, producing one continent, one continuous coast, and one ocean. In late Neoproterozoic to early Paleozoic, when the tremendous proliferation of diverse metazoa occurred, isolation of marine environments resulted from the breakup of Pannotia.

A north–south arrangement of continents and oceans leads to much more diversity and isolation than east–west arrangements. North-to-south arrangements give climatically different zones along the communication routes to the north and south, which are separated by water or land from other continental or oceanic zones of similar climate. Formation of similar tracts of continents and ocean basins oriented east–west would lead to much less isolation, diversification, and slower evolution, since each continent or ocean is in fewer climatic zones. Through the Cenozoic, isolation has been maximized by a north–south arrangement.

== See also ==
- History of Earth
- List of supercontinents
- Chronology of continents
