= Expelled: No Intelligence Allowed =

2008 American propaganda film

- Promotional release poster
- Directed by: Nathan Frankowski
- Written by: Kevin Miller; Ben Stein; Walt Ruloff
- Produced by: Logan Craft; Walt Ruloff; John Sullivan
- Starring: Ben Stein
- Edited by: Simon Tondeur
- Music by: Andy Hunter; Robbie Bronnimann
- Production companies: Premise Media Corporation; Rampant Films
- Distributed by: Vivendi Entertainment; Rocky Mountain Pictures
- Release date: April 18, 2008
- Running time: 96.5 minutes
- Country: United States
- Language: English
- Budget: $3.5 million
- Box office: $7.7 million

Expelled: No Intelligence Allowed is a 2008 American propaganda film directed by Nathan Frankowski and starring Ben Stein. It is presented as a documentary promoting the conspiracy theory that academia oppresses and excludes people who believe in intelligent design. It portrays the scientific theory of evolution as a contributor to communism, fascism, atheism, eugenics, and in particular Nazi atrocities in the Holocaust. Although intelligent design is a pseudoscientific religious idea, the film presents it as science-based, without giving a detailed definition of the concept or attempting to explain it on a scientific level. Other than briefly addressing issues of irreducible complexity, Expelled examines intelligent design purely as a political issue.

Expelled opened in 1,052 movie theaters, more than any other documentary before it, and grossed over $2,900,000 in its first weekend. It earned $7.7 million, making it the 33rd highest-grossing documentary film in the United States (as of 2018, and not adjusted for inflation).

Media response to the film has been largely negative. Multiple reviews, including those of USA Today and Scientific American, described the film as propaganda, with USA Today adding that it was "a political rant disguised as a serious commentary on stifled freedom of inquiry" and Scientific American calling it "a science-free attack on Darwin". The New York Times deemed it "a conspiracy-theory rant masquerading as investigative inquiry" and "an unprincipled propaganda piece that insults believers and nonbelievers alike". Response to the film from conservative Christian groups was generally positive, praising the film for its humor and for focusing on what they perceive as a serious issue.

== Overview ==
The film was directed by Nathan Frankowski and stars Ben Stein. Stein provides narrative commentary throughout the film. He is depicted as visiting a sequence of universities to interview proponents of intelligent design who claim to have been victimized, and evolutionary scientists who are presented as atheists. The film makes considerable use of vintage film clips, including opening scenes showing the Berlin Wall being constructed as a metaphor for barriers to the scientific acceptance of intelligent design. The film takes aim at some scientific hypotheses of the origin of life, and presents a short animation portraying the inner workings of the cell to introduce the intelligent design concept of irreducible complexity, the claim that such complexity could not arise from spontaneous mutations. The intelligent design proponents shown include Richard Weikart, who claims that Darwinism influenced the Nazis. The film also associates Adolf Hitler's ambitions of a master race and the Holocaust to Darwinian ideas of survival of the fittest. It does so using stock footage film clips of Nazi concentration camp laboratories, as well as statements of sociologist Uta George, director of the Hadamar killing centre's Memorial Museum. The film directly addresses intelligent design only superficially, focusing on how it is treated in academia rather than on issues involving the concept itself. It makes almost no attempt to define intelligent design or show any scientific evidence in favor of intelligent design. Instead, the film deals with the subject almost entirely from a political, rather than scientific, viewpoint.

=== Promotion of intelligent design as an alternative to evolution ===
The film depicts intelligent design as an alternative to evolution, and claims it deserves a place in academia. This "design theory" is defined in the film by the Discovery Institute's Paul Nelson as "the study of patterns in nature that are best explained as a result of intelligence". Stein says in the film that intelligent design is not taught or researched in academia because it is "suppressed in a systematic and ruthless fashion". The National Center for Science Education (NCSE), one of the groups discussed in the film, responds that "Intelligent design has not produced any research to suppress", and "The fundamental problem with intelligent design as science is that intelligent design claims cannot be tested."

In the United States federal court case Kitzmiller v. Dover Area School District (2005), intelligent design was judged a repackaged version of creationism and as such introducing intelligent design in public school science classrooms was unconstitutional religious infringement. In the film, the president of the Discovery Institute, Bruce Chapman, denied that teaching intelligent design in science classes is an attempt to sneak religion into public schools. Stein, the Discovery Institute and Expelled's publicist, Motive Entertainment, have all used the film to build support for Academic Freedom bills in various states. These bills would permit educators in the public schools to independently introduce criticisms of or alternatives to evolution, but many view the bills as the latest in a series of anti-evolutionary strategies designed to bring creationism into the classroom.

=== Claims that intelligent design advocates are persecuted ===
The film contends that there is widespread persecution of educators and scientists who promote intelligent design, and a conspiracy to keep God out of the nation's laboratories and classrooms. The film contains interviews with educators and scientists in which they describe this persecution. In the film, Stein says, "It's not just the scientists who are in on it. The media is in on it, the courts, the educational system, everyone is after them." Stein further accuses academia of having a dogmatic commitment to Darwinism, comparable to the 'party line' of the Communist Party of the Soviet Union. Eugenie Scott of the National Center for Science Education stated that the filmmakers were exploiting Americans' sense of fairness as a way to sell their religious views and that she feared that the film would portray "the scientific community as intolerant, as close-minded, and as persecuting those who disagree with them. And this is simply wrong."

=== Portrayal of evolutionary science as atheistic ===
The film alleges that many scientists and the scientific enterprise are dogmatically committed to atheism, and that a commitment to materialism in the scientific establishment is behind the claimed suppression of intelligent design. William A. Dembski addressed the issue of design explanations in science, saying that "many fields of study involve intelligent design, including archaeology, forensics, and the Search for Extraterrestrial Intelligence (SETI). An archaeologist, for example, examines the evidence—like a curiously shaped stone—to determine whether it might be the product of a human intelligence." Stein contends that "There are people out there who want to keep science in a little box where it can't possibly touch a higher power, and it can’t possibly touch God." Scientific American criticised the film for failing to note that the scientific method deals only with explanations that can be tested or empirically validated, and so logically cannot use untestable religious or "design based" explanations.

The National Center for Science Education criticizes the film for the fallacy of composition: representing scientists who are atheists as representative of all scientists, without discussing the many prominent scientists who are religious, and thus creating a false dichotomy between science and religion. The associate producer of the film, Mark Mathis, said that although he didn't get to decide who and what interviews made it into the film, it was his opinion that including Roman Catholic biologist Kenneth R. Miller would have "confused the film unnecessarily". Mathis also questioned the intellectual honesty of a Catholic accepting evolution. Miller later noted that 40% of the members of the American Association for the Advancement of Science profess belief in a personal God.

In its review, the Waco Tribune-Herald said "That's the real issue of Expelled — atheist scientists versus God — even though it wholly undercuts statements by intelligent design researchers early in the film that ID has nothing to do with religion." It described the failure to cover "how Christian evolutionists reconcile faith and science" as "perhaps the film's most glaring and telling omission", and said that the film rather "quickly dismissed [such proponents of theistic evolution] by a chain of quotes that brand them as liberal Christians and duped by militant atheists in their efforts to get religion out of the classroom". Defending the film, the producer, Walt Ruloff, said that scientists like prominent geneticist Francis Collins keep their religion and science separate because they are "toeing the party line". Collins, who was not asked to be interviewed for the film in any of its incarnations, called Ruloff's claims "just ludicrous".

=== Claims that the theory of evolution was necessary for the development of Nazism ===
Richard Weikart, a historian and Discovery Institute fellow, appears in the film asserting that Charles Darwin's work in the 19th century influenced Adolf Hitler. He argues that Darwin's perception of humans not being qualitatively different from animals, with qualities such as morality arising from natural processes, undermines what Weikart calls the "Judeo-Christian conception of the sanctity of human life". Nazi gas chambers and concentration camps figure highly in the narrative of the film. In the film, philosopher and Discovery Institute fellow David Berlinski says that Darwinism was a "necessary though not sufficient" cause for the Holocaust, and Uta George, director of the Hadamar Memorial in Germany, says that "the Nazis, they relied on Darwin. Yes, and German scientists."

Scientific American editor John Rennie wrote that the film repeatedly uses the term "Darwinism" instead of evolution to misportray science as though it were a "dogmatic, atheistic ideology".

Arthur Caplan, director of the Center for Bioethics at the University of Pennsylvania, wrote in his MSNBC column that the film is a "frighteningly immoral narrative", including "a toxic mishmash of persecution fantasies, disconnected and inappropriate references to fallen communist regimes and their leaders and a very repugnant form of Holocaust denial from the monotone big mouth Ben Stein". Caplan sharply criticized what he described as Stein's willingness "to subvert the key reason why the Holocaust took place — racism — to serve his own ideological end. Expelled indeed."

In an April 7, 2008, interview with Paul Crouch, Jr., on the Trinity Broadcasting Network about the film, Stein said that science had led to the Nazi murder of children, and stated that "Love of God and compassion and empathy leads you to a very glorious place. Science leads you to killing people."

On April 29, 2008, the Anti-Defamation League issued the following statement condemning the film's use of the Holocaust:

The film Expelled: No Intelligence Allowed misappropriates the Holocaust and its imagery as a part of its political effort to discredit the scientific community which rejects so-called intelligent design theory.

Hitler did not need Darwin to devise his heinous plan to exterminate the Jewish people and Darwin and evolutionary theory cannot explain Hitler's genocidal madness.

Using the Holocaust in order to tarnish those who promote the theory of evolution is outrageous and trivializes the complex factors that led to the mass extermination of European Jewry.

When Vancouver Sun writer Peter McKnight asked for Stein to comment on the Anti-Defamation League's statement, Stein replied, "It's none of their f---ing [sic] business."

== People presented in the film ==
The film portrays several people including Richard Sternberg, Guillermo Gonzalez, and Caroline Crocker as victims of persecution by major scientific organizations and academia for their promotion of intelligent design and for questioning Darwinism. Other intelligent design supporters such as William A. Dembski, Stephen C. Meyer, Jonathan Wells, Paul Nelson, Pamela Winnick, and Gerald Schroeder, along with contrarian David Berlinski, appear in the film as well. Expelled additionally briefly features numerous anonymous people, their faces darkened to make them unrecognizable, who say that their jobs in the sciences would be jeopardized if their belief in intelligent design were made public, one of whom states that he believes most scientists equate intelligent design with creationism, the religious right, and theocracy.

In addition, the film includes interviews with scientists and others who advocate the teaching of evolution and criticize intelligent design as an attempt to bring religion into the science classroom. Those interviewed include PZ Myers, William B. Provine, Richard Dawkins, Michael Ruse, Michael Shermer, Christopher Hitchens, and Eugenie Scott.

=== The "Expelled" ===
==== Richard Sternberg ====
Expelled features excerpts from an interview Stein conducted with Richard Sternberg, described as an evolutionary biologist (he has two PhDs: biology (molecular evolution) and systems science (theoretical biology)) and a former editor for a scientific journal associated with the Smithsonian Institution. The film says his life was "nearly ruined" after he published an article by intelligent design proponent Stephen C. Meyer in 2004, allegedly causing him to lose his office, to be pressured to resign, and to become the subject of an investigation into his political and religious views. Sternberg defended his decision, stating that intelligent design was not the overall subject of the paper (being mentioned only at the end) and that he was attempting merely to present questions ID proponents had raised as a topic for discussion. He presented himself and Meyer as targets of religious and political persecution, claiming the chairman of his department referred to him as an "intellectual terrorist". Stein states that the paper "ignited a firestorm of controversy merely because it suggested intelligent design might be able to explain how life began", and goes beyond the findings of the United States Office of Special Counsel to claim that Sternberg was "terrorized". Stein further alleges that U.S. Representative Mark Souder uncovered a campaign by the Smithsonian and the NCSE to destroy Sternberg's credibility, though he does not provide any details.

Sternberg, a staff scientist for the National Center for Biotechnology Information and also a fellow of the intelligent design advocacy group International Society for Complexity, Information, and Design (ISCID), had resigned his position at the journal Proceedings of the Biological Society of Washington six months before publication of the Meyers paper. The Council of the Biological Society of Washington has stated that "Contrary to typical editorial practices, the paper was published without review by any associate editor; Sternberg handled the entire review process." Although in the film Stein says the paper "suggested intelligent design might be able to explain how life began", it discussed the much later development of phyla during the Cambrian explosion and deviated from the journal's topic of systematics to introduce previously discredited claims about bioinformatics. The Society subsequently declared that the paper "does not meet the scientific standards of the Proceedings" and would not have been published had typical editorial practices been followed. Sternberg, contrary to the impression given by the film, was not an employee, but an unpaid Research Associate at the Smithsonian's National Museum of Natural History, a post which ran for a limited period. Also contrary to the way his career was depicted in the film, Sternberg still retained this position until 2007, when he was given the offer of continuing as a Research Collaborator. He continued to have full access to research facilities at the museum as of April 2008.

==== Caroline Crocker ====
Expelled profiles Caroline Crocker, a former part-time cell biology lecturer at George Mason University who became the center of controversy over intelligent design. In the film Stein states, "After she simply mentioned Intelligent Design in her cell biology class at the ... [u]niversity, Caroline Crocker's sterling academic career came to an abrupt end", and she was blacklisted. Crocker tells Stein that before the incident she was routinely offered jobs on the spot following an interview, but afterwards she was unable to find a position in academia.

According to the university and the National Center for Science Education (NCSE), Crocker was not fired; her position was non-tenure track and her employment was on a course-by-course basis. She taught to the end of her contract, which was not renewed. A George Mason University spokesman said this was for reasons unrelated to her views on intelligent design, and that although they wholeheartedly supported academic freedom, "teachers also have a responsibility to stick to subjects they were hired to teach,... and intelligent design belonged in a religion class, not biology. Does academic freedom 'literally give you the right to talk about anything, whether it has anything to do with the subject matter or not? The answer is no.'"

The NCSE also stated that she did more than merely mention intelligent design, but in fact posed many refuted creationist arguments. Crocker also did find a position at Northern Virginia Community College, where she was later profiled by The Washington Post. The Post's article stated she claimed "that the scientific establishment was perpetrating fraud, hunting down critics of evolution to ruin them and disguising an atheistic view of life in the garb of science". Her lecture, which she said was the same she taught at George Mason, taught students creationist claims about evolution and promoted intelligent design in a biology class, telling them that Nazi atrocities were based on Darwin's ideas and on science.

Crocker subsequently conducted a year of postdoctoral studies at the Uniformed Services University in 2006, and from early 2008 to the summer of 2008 was the first executive director of the Intelligent Design and Evolution Awareness Center (IDEA), which promotes intelligent design clubs at high schools and universities. In 2009, Crocker became the founder and president of the American Institute for Technology and Science Education (AITSE), a California-based 501(c)(3) nonprofit organization that ceased operations in October 2013, leaving behind a moribund website, after Crocker left to pursue other interests and the AITSE board decided that AITSE had accomplished its purpose. She is the author of the 2010 book Free to Think, which includes a foreword by Ben Stein, published by micropublisher Leafcutter Press.

==== Michael Egnor ====
Michael Egnor, a neurosurgery professor at Stony Brook University, is presented in the film as the subject of persecution after writing a letter to high school students asserting that doctors did not need to learn evolution to practice their trade. Egnor, who is a signatory to the Discovery Institute's "A Scientific Dissent from Darwinism" and "Physicians and Surgeons who Dissent from Darwinism", presents himself as the victim of online smears and a campaign to get his university to force him into retirement, following his letter. When a citizen's group in Virginia sponsored an essay contest for high school students on the topic "Why I would want my doctor to have studied evolution", Egnor responded by posting the letter on an intelligent design website claiming that evolution was irrelevant to medicine.

In the film, Stein describes this as "Darwinists were quick to try and exterminate this new threat", and Egnor says he was shocked by the "viciousness" and "baseness" of the critical response he received.

==== Robert J. Marks II ====
Robert J. Marks II is a professor at Baylor University who had his research website shut down by the university and was forced to return grant money when it was discovered his work had a link to intelligent design. The research in question was for the Evolutionary Informatics Lab which Marks formed with Discovery Institute fellow William A. Dembski, and which made use of the university's servers to host the website. The university removed the website after receiving complaints that it appeared to be endorsed by the university. Baylor officials later allowed the website back on their server but required changes be made to the website so that it did not appear to be endorsed by the university. The website was reestablished independently of Baylor University.

==== Guillermo Gonzalez ====
Guillermo Gonzalez, an astrophysicist who had been an assistant professor in the Department of Physics and Astronomy at Iowa State University until May 2008, is interviewed by Stein, who claims that despite a "stellar" research record that led to the discovery of new planets, Gonzalez was denied tenure in April 2007 because his book The Privileged Planet (2004), co-authored with analytic philosopher and intelligent design advocate Jay W. Richards, argued that the universe is intelligently designed. Gonzalez claims that prior to his tenure review, he was the subject of a campaign on campus to "poison the atmosphere" against him, and that he would almost certainly have been granted tenure had he not been an advocate for intelligent design. The film interviewed a member of the Iowa State University faculty who stated that Gonzalez was denied tenure because the university feared that if they granted Gonzalez tenure the university would become associated with the intelligent design movement.

Prior to the film's release Iowa State University addressed the controversy regarding Gonzalez's tenure by saying that after the normal review of his qualifications, such as his record of scientific publications (which had dropped sharply after he joined the faculty), he was not granted tenure and promotion on the grounds that he "simply did not show the trajectory of excellence that we expect in a candidate seeking tenure in physics and astronomy". Eli Rosenberg, the chairman of the Astronomy department, also noted that during Gonzalez's time at Iowa State, Gonzalez had failed to secure any form of substantial outside funding. In the previous decade, four of the twelve candidates who came up for review in the department were not granted tenure.

=== Opponents of intelligent design ===
==== Michael Shermer ====
Michael Shermer is an author, science historian, founder of The Skeptics Society, and editor of its magazine Skeptic, which is largely devoted to investigating and debunking pseudoscientific and supernatural claims. He was interviewed for the film by Stein and Mark Mathis to get his take on intelligent design and evolution. Shermer describes intelligent design as "three quarters of the way to nonsense", and voices skepticism at the claims that numerous academics were fired for advocating it.

Shermer, in an online column coinciding with the release of Expelled, described feeling awkward about their motives soon after the interview began:

For my part, the moment I sat down with Stein (with Mathis there) and he asked me that question about firing people for expressing dissenting views a dozen times, I realized that I was being manipulated to give certain answers they were looking for me to give. I asked them both, several times, if they had anything else to ask me about evolutionary theory or Intelligent Design. In frustration I finally said something like "Do you have any other questions to ask me or do you keep asking me this question in hopes that I'll give a different answer?"

After a break and small talk the interview resumed, but the questions continued to follow a similar vein:

Stein finally asked my opinion on people being fired for endorsing Intelligent Design. I replied that I know of no instance where such a firing has happened. This seemingly innocent observation was turned into a filmic confession of ignorance when my on-camera interview abruptly ends there, because when I saw Expelled at a preview screening... I discovered that the central thesis of the film is a conspiracy theory about the systematic attempt to keep Intelligent Design creationism out of American classrooms and culture.

Shermer has stated that he believes that the film is effective in delivering its message to its target audience.

==== Richard Dawkins ====
Richard Dawkins is an evolutionary biologist and popular science writer. Dawkins is portrayed as one of the leading members of the scientific establishment. Dawkins' admission that his study of evolution aided his move towards atheism is used by the film to draw a positive connection between them. In her review of the film for New Scientist, Amanda Gefter comments on the film's presentation of Dawkins' interview, including showing him "in the make-up chair, a move calculated to demean since surely everyone else, including Stein, is powder-puffed off-camera", and describes "foreboding music" and a "low-lit room" filmed with "sinister camera angles" used as part of an appeal to "raw emotion" during his interview.

In Dawkins' interview, the director focused on Stein's question to Dawkins regarding a hypothetical scenario in which intelligent design could have occurred. Dawkins responded that in the case of the "highly unlikely event that some such 'Directed Panspermia' was responsible for designing life on this planet, the alien beings would THEMSELVES have to have evolved, if not by Darwinian selection, by some equivalent 'crane' (to quote Dan Dennett)". He later described this as being similar to Francis Crick and Leslie Orgel's "semi tongue-in-cheek" example.

=== Accusations that film producers misled interviewees ===
The film has been criticized by those interviewees who are critics of intelligent design (PZ Myers, Dawkins, Shermer, and Eugenie Scott), who say they were misled into participating by being asked to be interviewed for a film named Crossroads: The Intersection of Science and Religion, and were directed to a blurb implying an approach to the documentary crediting Darwin with "the answer" to how humanity developed:

It has been the central question of humanity through the ages: How in the world did we get here? In 1859 Charles Darwin provided the answer in his landmark book, The Origin of Species. In the century and a half since, geologists, biologists, physicists, astronomers, and philosophers have contributed a vast amount of research and data in support of Darwin's idea. And yet, millions of Christians, Muslims, Jews, and other people of faith believe in a literal interpretation that humans were crafted by the hand of God. The conflict between science and religion has unleashed passions in school board meetings, courtrooms, and town halls across America and beyond.

— Defunct Rampant Films website for Crossroads

But before the interviewees were approached, the film had already been pitched to Stein as an anti-Darwinist picture:

I was approached a couple of years ago by the producers, and they described to me the central issue of Expelled, which was about Darwinism and why it has such a lock on the academic establishment when the theory has so many holes. And why freedom of speech has been lost at so many colleges to the point where you can't question even the slightest bit of Darwinism or your colleagues will spurn you, you'll lose your job, and you'll be publicly humiliated. As they sent me books and talked to me about these things I became more enthusiastic about participating. Plus I was never a big fan of Darwinism because it played such a large part in the Nazis' Final Solution to their so-called "Jewish problem" and was so clearly instrumental in their rationalizing of the Holocaust. So I was primed to want to do a project on how Darwinism relates to fascism and to outline the flaws in Darwinism generally.

— Ben Stein, "Mocked and Belittled", WORLD

On learning of the pro-intelligent design stance of the real film, Myers said, "not telling one of the sides in a debate about what the subject might be and then leading him around randomly to various topics, with the intent of later editing it down to the parts that just make the points you want, is the video version of quote-mining and is fundamentally dishonest". Dawkins said, "At no time was I given the slightest clue that these people were a creationist front", and Scott said, "I just expect people to be honest with me, and they weren't."

Mathis called Myers, Dawkins and Scott a "bunch of hypocrites", and said that he "went over all of the questions with these folks before the interviews and I e-mailed the questions to many of them days in advance".

Roy Speckhardt, executive director of the American Humanist Association wrote a letter to the editor of The New York Times, writing, "If one needs to believe in a god to be moral, why are we seeing yet another case of dishonesty by the devout? Why were leading scientists deceived as to the intentions of a religious group of filmmakers?"

== Charles Darwin quotation issue ==
In support of his claim that the theory of evolution inspired Nazism, Ben Stein attributes the following statement to Charles Darwin's 1871 book The Descent of Man:

With savages, the weak in body or mind are soon eliminated. We civilised men, on the other hand, do our utmost to check the process of elimination; we build asylums for the imbecile, the maimed, and the sick. Thus the weak members of civilised societies propagate their kind. No one who has attended to the breeding of domestic animals will doubt that this must be highly injurious to the race of man. Hardly any one is so ignorant as to allow his worst animals to breed.

The original source shows that Stein's selective reading of Darwin significantly changed the meaning of the paragraph by leaving out whole and partial sentences without indicating that he had done so. The original paragraph (words that Stein omitted shown in bold type) and the subsequent paragraph in the book state:

With savages, the weak in body or mind are soon eliminated; and those that survive commonly exhibit a vigorous state of health. We civilised men, on the other hand, do our utmost to check the process of elimination; we build asylums for the imbecile, the maimed, and the sick; we institute poor-laws; and our medical men exert their utmost skill to save the life of every one to the last moment. There is reason to believe that vaccination has preserved thousands, who from a weak constitution would formerly have succumbed to small-pox. Thus the weak members of civilised societies propagate their kind. No one who has attended to the breeding of domestic animals will doubt that this must be highly injurious to the race of man. It is surprising how soon a want of care, or care wrongly directed, leads to the degeneration of a domestic race; but excepting in the case of man himself, hardly any one is so ignorant as to allow his worst animals to breed. The aid which we feel impelled to give to the helpless is mainly an incidental result of the instinct of sympathy, which was originally acquired as part of the social instincts, but subsequently rendered, in the manner previously indicated, more tender and more widely diffused. Nor could we check our sympathy, if so urged by hard reason, without deterioration in the noblest part of our nature. The surgeon may harden himself whilst performing an operation, for he knows that he is acting for the good of his patient; but if we were intentionally to neglect the weak and helpless, it could only be for a contingent benefit, with a certain and great present evil. Hence we must bear without complaining the undoubtedly bad effects of the weak surviving and propagating their kind; but there appears to be at least one check in steady action, namely the weaker and inferior members of society not marrying so freely as the sound; and this check might be indefinitely increased, though this is more to be hoped for than expected, by the weak in body or mind refraining from marriage.

According to John Moore writing for the Canadian National Post:

Stein quotes from a passage in Darwin's writing that appears to endorse the notion that for a species to thrive the infirm must be culled. He omits the part where Darwin insists this would be "evil" and that man's care for the weak is "the noblest part of our nature". When I asked Stein about this on my radio show he deadpanned, "If any Darwin fans are listening and we have misquoted him, we are sorry; we don't mean to diss Darwin."

The National Center for Science Education's Expelled Exposed: Why Expelled Flunks website also points out that the same misleading selective quotation from this passage was used by anti-evolutionist William Jennings Bryan in the 1925 Scopes Trial, but the full passage makes it clear that Darwin was not advocating eugenics. The eugenics movement relied on simplistic and faulty assumptions about heredity, and by the 1920s evolutionary biologists were criticizing eugenics. Clarence Darrow, who defended the teaching of human evolution in the Scopes Trial, wrote a scathing repudiation of eugenics.

In a supplement to a review of Expelled, Natural History Museum of Los Angeles County curator Kirk J. Fitzhugh cites Darwin's two paragraphs in their entirety, and says that in the context shown by the second paragraph "What we find is that Darwin's position is diametrically opposed to what Stein intimated."

== Pre-release screenings ==
As part of the pre-release marketing for the film, a web-based RSVP system page was publicized, offering free private film screenings. Persons filling out an online entry form were sent a reservation confirmation via email which stated that no ticket was needed and that IDs would be checked against a list of names. The producers also held invitation-only screenings for religious organizations and government officials, including screenings for legislators to promote anti-evolution Academic Freedom bills.

=== Conservative Christian groups ===
In advance of release, the film was shown at private screenings to various Christian conservative leaders, including American evangelical Christian author and psychologist James Dobson. On March 11, 2008, a preview screening was held in Nashville, Tennessee, for attendees at the annual convention of the National Religious Broadcasters. The young Earth creationist organization Answers in Genesis reported that its leader, Ken Ham, met Ben Stein beforehand to discuss promoting the film. It requested supporters to ask local movie theater managers to show the film, and to encourage their church leadership to buy out a local theater to show the film to as many people from that church as possible.

=== Screenings in support of Academic Freedom bills ===
Expelled was given pre-release screenings for Florida and Missouri legislators in support of Academic Freedom bills in those states. Such bills, often viewed as attacks on the teaching of evolution, have been introduced in state legislatures in the United States since 2004, based on the claims by the Discovery Institute that teachers, students, and college professors face intimidation and retaliation when discussing scientific criticisms of evolution, and therefore require protection. The Florida screening, held in the IMAX theater of the Challenger Learning Center of Tallahassee, Florida, on March 12, 2008, was restricted to legislators, their spouses, and their legislative aides, with the press and public excluded. Under the Florida Sunshine Law they had to watch the film without discussing the issue or arranging any future votes. Commenting on this, and the controversy over Roger Moore of the Orlando Sentinel viewing the film despite attempts by the promoters to withdraw the invitation they had given him, House Democratic leader Dan Gelber of Miami Beach, Florida, stated, "It's kind of an irony: The public is expelled from a movie called Expelled." The screening was attended by about 100 people, but few were legislators, and the majority of legislators stayed away.

Shortly before the film's general release, Walt Ruloff held a press conference at The Heritage Foundation in Washington, D.C., on April 15, and announced his plans to use the film as part of a campaign to pass Academic Freedom bills in a variety of American states. At least one Discovery Institute press conference on the bills has included a screening of Expelled. The issue was revived in 2009 when Florida Senator Stephen Wise cited the film as one reason that he is sponsoring plans to introduce a bill requiring biology teachers to present the idea of intelligent design.

=== PZ Myers and Richard Dawkins at Minnesota pre-release screening ===
Expelled interviewee PZ Myers was turned away from a pre-release screening of the film by a hired security guard as Myers, fellow interviewee Richard Dawkins, and members of Myers' family waited together in line to enter the theater. Myers said that he applied for tickets for himself and his guests on the website where the film's producers were offering free passes to the screening to the general public. Dawkins and Myers' family were allowed to attend, but Myers and Dawkins both concluded Dawkins would have been turned away as well if those promoting the film had recognized who he was.

This rejection of one of the evolution supporters prominently featured in the film created a furor as critics and supporters volleyed conflicting accounts of the incident. Myers wrote, "I went to attend a screening of the creationist propaganda movie, Expelled, a few minutes ago. Well, I tried … but I was Expelled!" Prior to this screening, Myers and Dawkins were both very public in their condemnations of the upcoming film, leading them to conclude this was the reason Myers was banned from the screening. Dawkins charged "P.Z. is in the film extensively. If anyone had a right to see the film, it was him."

Walt Ruloff countered that they were using the screenings to stimulate favorable publicity for the film, and Mark Mathis confirmed that he ordered Myers turned away. He wrote, "In light of Myers' untruthful blogging about Expelled I decided it was better to have him wait until April 18 and pay to see the film. Others, notable others, were permitted to see the film. At a private screening it's my call." But he went on to say, "Unlike the Darwinist establishment, we expel no one."

Critics of the film publicly ridiculed Myers' ejection as a public relations blunder. Eugenie Scott, who also appeared in the film, was quoted to say she and fellow supporters of evolution were enjoying "a horselaugh" over the episode. Myers said, "I could not imagine a better result for this. They've shown themselves to be completely dishonest and that they're trying to hide the truth about their movie, which is to my advantage. And they've shown themselves to be such flaming idiots." Dawkins described the event as "a gift" and said "we could not ask for anything better".

== Promotion ==
The promotion of Expelled was primarily managed by Motive Entertainment, an agency that promoted the 2004 blockbuster film The Passion of the Christ, with another three public relations firms also hired. The producers spent an estimated $8.5 million to market their film, with an additional $3.5 million spent on the production, resulting in a $12 million total budget. The promoters targeted primarily religious audiences, providing sweepstakes and rewards to churches selling the most tickets, and offered sums of up to $10,000 to schools that sent their students to watch the film. In advance of the film's release, producers Walt Ruloff, Mark Mathis, and Logan Craft provided interviews to various Christian media outlets promoting the film and emphasizing its potential to impact the evolution debate. Motive Entertainment also sent a representative to meet with religious leaders and stress the film's intelligent design creationist message, inspiring many to actively promote the film within their own religious communities. Some Christian media outlets promoted the film as well.

Organizations affiliated with the Discovery Institute helped publicize the film. It used its Evolution News & Views website and blog to publish over twenty articles tying its promotion of Expelled to its effort to pass the "Evolution Academic Freedom Act" (SB2692) in Florida.

Stein appeared in the cable television programs The O'Reilly Factor and the Glenn Beck Program to talk about the film. In his interview with political commentator Bill O'Reilly, O'Reilly characterized intelligent design as the idea that "a deity created life", and Stein responded that "There's no doubt about it. We have lots and lots of evidence of it in the movie." The Discovery Institute quickly issued a statement that when Bill O'Reilly conflated intelligent design with creationism he was mistakenly defining it as an attempt to find a divine designer, and lamented that "Ben referred to the 'gaps' in Darwin's theory, as if those are the only issues that intelligent design theory addresses."

Stein and the producers hosted a telephone press conference facilitated by Motive Entertainment's representative Paul Lauer. Participating journalists were required to submit their questions in advance for screening and just two questions posed by members of the press were answered. One of the journalists participating, Dan Whipple of the Colorado Confidential, contrasted the carefully staged and stringently controlled press conference with Ruloff's statement that "What we're really asking for is freedom of speech, and allowing science, and students, people in applied or theoretical research to have the freedom to go where they need to go and ask the questions". He called it "hypocritical in its supposed defense of 'freedom of expression.'"

== Reception ==
Expelled: No Intelligence Allowed was not screened in advance for film critics, and when the film was released, it received negative reviews. On the review aggregator website Rotten Tomatoes, 11% of 45 critics' reviews are positive. The website's consensus reads: "Full of patronizing, poorly structured arguments, Expelled is a cynical political stunt in the guise of a documentary." Metacritic, which uses a weighted average, assigned the film a score of 20 out of 100, based on 13 critics, indicating "generally unfavorable" reviews.

The film's extensive use of Michael Moore-style devices was commented upon, but the film was mainly characterized as boring, exaggerated, and unconvincing. Others found it insulting and offensive to the religious. The Globe and Mail's film review called it "an appallingly unscrupulous example of hack propaganda". Vue Weekly called it an "anti-science propaganda masquerading as a Michael Moore-ish fool's journey, full of disingenuous ploys, cheap tricks, and outright mendacity". While noting that the film is technically well made (with good photography and editing), Roger Ebert lambasted the content of the film:

This film is cheerfully ignorant, manipulative, slanted, cherry-picks quotations, draws unwarranted conclusions, makes outrageous juxtapositions (Soviet marching troops representing opponents of ID), pussy-foots around religion (not a single identified believer among the ID people), segues between quotes that are not about the same thing, tells bald-faced lies, and makes a completely baseless association between freedom of speech and freedom to teach religion in a university class that is not about religion.

Multiple reviews, including those of USA Today and Scientific American, described the film as propaganda. The Chicago Tribune's rating was "1 star (poor)", while The New York Times described it as "a conspiracy-theory rant masquerading as investigative inquiry" and "an unprincipled propaganda piece that insults believers and nonbelievers alike".

The American Association for the Advancement of Science (AAAS) issued a statement to say it was "especially disappointed to learn that the producers of an intelligent design propaganda movie called Expelled are inappropriately pitting science against religion". It went on to say the organization "further decries the profound dishonesty and lack of civility demonstrated by this effort", and said the film "seeks to force religious viewpoints into science class--despite court decisions that have struck down efforts to bring creationism and intelligent design into schools". They also described the film as dishonest and divisive propaganda, aimed at introducing religious ideas into public school science classrooms. Paul Kurtz, founder and late chairman of the Center for Inquiry, called the film "anti-science propaganda" and an "exercise in anti-intellectualism at its worst".

Response to the film from conservative Christian groups was generally positive, praising the film for its humor and for focusing on what they perceive as a serious issue. Tom Bethell, a senior editor of The American Spectator, said that the "only complaint about Expelled, scheduled for April release, is that its ending came all too soon". Christianity Today gave Expelled of 3 out of 4 stars. Screen Rant gave Expelled 4.5 out of 5 stars, saying that "your opinion of the film will with almost complete certainty be predicted by your opinions on Darwinism vs Intelligent Design".

The film has been used in private screenings to legislators as part of the Discovery Institute intelligent design campaign for so-called Academic Freedom bills.

Stein received the Freedom of Expression Award for his work in Expelled from the Home Entertainment Awards at the Entertainment Merchants Association's Home Media Expo 2008 held at the Palms Casino Resort in Las Vegas, Nevada.

=== Box office and home video sales ===
As of September 2018, Expelled has grossed over $7.7 million and was the 33rd highest-grossing documentary film in the United States since 1982, and was the 9th highest-grossing political documentary film since 1982. Expelled opened in 1,052 movie theaters, earning $2,970,848 for its opening weekend with a $2,824 theater average. Prior to the film's opening, producer Walt Ruloff said the film could top the $23.9-million opening for Michael Moore's 2004 polemic against President George W. Bush, Fahrenheit 9/11, the best launch for a documentary to date. Expelled's returns were impressive for a film in the typically low grossing documentary genre, but it was far surpassed by both Moore's 2007 Sicko and Fahrenheit 9/11.

Expelled's home video releases distributed by Vivendi Entertainment grossed over $5,990,000 in total sales as of January 2016.

== Bankruptcy and film rights ==
Premise Media Holdings, LP, the company that produced Expelled, filed for Chapter 7 bankruptcy on December 29, 2009. On May 31, 2011, the company filed a motion, declaring its desire to sell all properties and rights related to the film at auction pursuant to the bankruptcy proceeding. The rights to the film were sold at an online auction for $201,000 on June 28, 2011, to an unnamed bidder.

== See also ==
- Rejection of evolution by religious groups
- Flock of Dodos
- Judgment Day: Intelligent Design on Trial
- The Root of All Evil?
- The Voyage that Shook the World
