= PCID =

PCID may refer to:

- Pontifical Council for Interreligious Dialogue, a dicastery of the Roman Curia
- Progress in Complexity, Information, and Design, a former journal set up by intelligent design proponents
- Process-context identifier, a feature in newer Intel 64 processors

== See also ==
- PCID2 (PCI domain containing 2), a protein that in humans is encoded by the PCID2 gene
