= Rare earth =

Rare earth may refer to:

== Science and technology ==
=== Astrobiology ===
- Rare Earth: Why Complex Life Is Uncommon in the Universe, a book by Peter Ward and Donald E. Brownlee
  - Rare Earth hypothesis, the hypothesis that complex life in the universe is exceptionally rare, spawned by the book

=== Chemistry and geology ===
- Rare-earth elements, a group of elements on the periodic table
- Rare-earth mineral, a mineral that contains one or more rare-earth elements as major metal constituents
- Rare-earth magnet, a type of magnet that employs rare earth elements to increase effectiveness

== Music ==
- Rare Earth (band), an American musical group
- Rare Earth Records, a subsidiary of Motown Records which produced rock music
