= Jay W. Richards =

American analytic philosopher

- Born: Jay Wesley Richards
- Education: Southwestern University (BA); Calvin Theological Seminary (ThM); Union Presbyterian Seminary (MDiv); Princeton Theological Seminary (PhD)
- Occupation: Academic

Jay Wesley Richards is an American analytical philosopher who focuses on the intersection of politics, philosophy, and religion. He is the vice president of social and domestic policy and the William E. Simon Senior Research Fellow in American Principles and Public Policy at the DeVos Center for Religion and Civil Society at the Heritage Foundation. He is also an adjunct professor of business at the Catholic University of America and a senior fellow at the Discovery Institute. A former Presbyterian, Richards is now a Catholic.

== Early life and education ==
Richards graduated from Southwestern University with a Bachelor of Arts in political science and religious studies. He then earned a Master of Theology (Th.M.) degree from Calvin Theological Seminary and a Master of Divinity (M.Div.) degree from Union Presbyterian Seminary. He earned his Ph.D. with honors in philosophy and theology from Princeton Theological Seminary.

== Career ==
Richards is author or editor of more than a dozen books, including the New York Times bestsellers Infiltrated (2013) and Indivisible (2012); The Human Advantage; Money, Greed, and God, winner of a 2010 Templeton Enterprise Award; The Hobbit Party with Jonathan Witt; and Eat, Fast, Feast.

Richards was a fellow at the Institute for Faith, Work & Economics and the program director of the Discovery Institute's Center for Science and Culture (CSC). He was the first fellow at the Discovery Institute to confirm the genuineness of the Wedge document. Science organizations then paid attention to the institute after the document was published online, but Richards wrote "that the mission statement and goals had been posted on the CRSC's website since 1996." Richards has expressed climate change denial.

In January 2008, at Stanford University, Jay Richards had a debate with a leading atheist, Christopher Hitchens, on the topic: Atheism vs. Theism and The Scientific Evidence of Intelligent Design. It was moderated by Ben Stein. The debate led up to the release of Ben Stein's movie Expelled: No Intelligence Allowed.

Richards taught an apologetics course at Biola University. He has worked for the Acton Institute and is the executive editor of The Stream.

== Bibliography ==
- Unapologetic Apologetics: Meeting the Challenges of Theological Studies. William A. Dembski, Jay Wesley Richards. Downer's Grove, Illinois: InterVarsity Press, January 2001. ISBN 0-8308-1563-5
- Are We Spiritual Machines?: Ray Kurzweil vs. the Critics of Strong A.I. by Jay W. Richards, George Gilder, Ray Kurzweil, Thomas Ray, John Searle, William Dembski, Michael Denton. Discovery Institute, June 2001. ISBN 0-9638654-3-9
- The Untamed God: A Philosophical Exploration of Divine Perfection, Immutability and Simplicity by Jay Wesley Richards, InterVarsity Press, October 2003. ISBN 0-8308-2734-X
- The Privileged Planet: How Our Place in the Cosmos Is Designed for Discovery by Guillermo Gonzalez, Jay W. Richards, Regnery Publishing, Inc., Washington D.C., March 2004, ISBN 0-89526-065-4
- Money, Greed, and God: Why Capitalism Is the Solution and Not the Problem. New York: HarperOne, 2009. ISBN 978-0-06-137561-3
- Eat, Fast, Feast: Heal Your Body While Feeding Your Soul- A Christian Guide to Fasting. HarperOne, January 2020. ISBN 9780062905215
- The Price of Panic: How the Tyranny of Experts Turned a Pandemic into a Catastrophe by Jay W. Richards, Douglas Axe and William M. Briggs, Regnery Publishing, October 2020. ISBN 9781684511419
