= William B. Provine =

American historian (1942–2015)

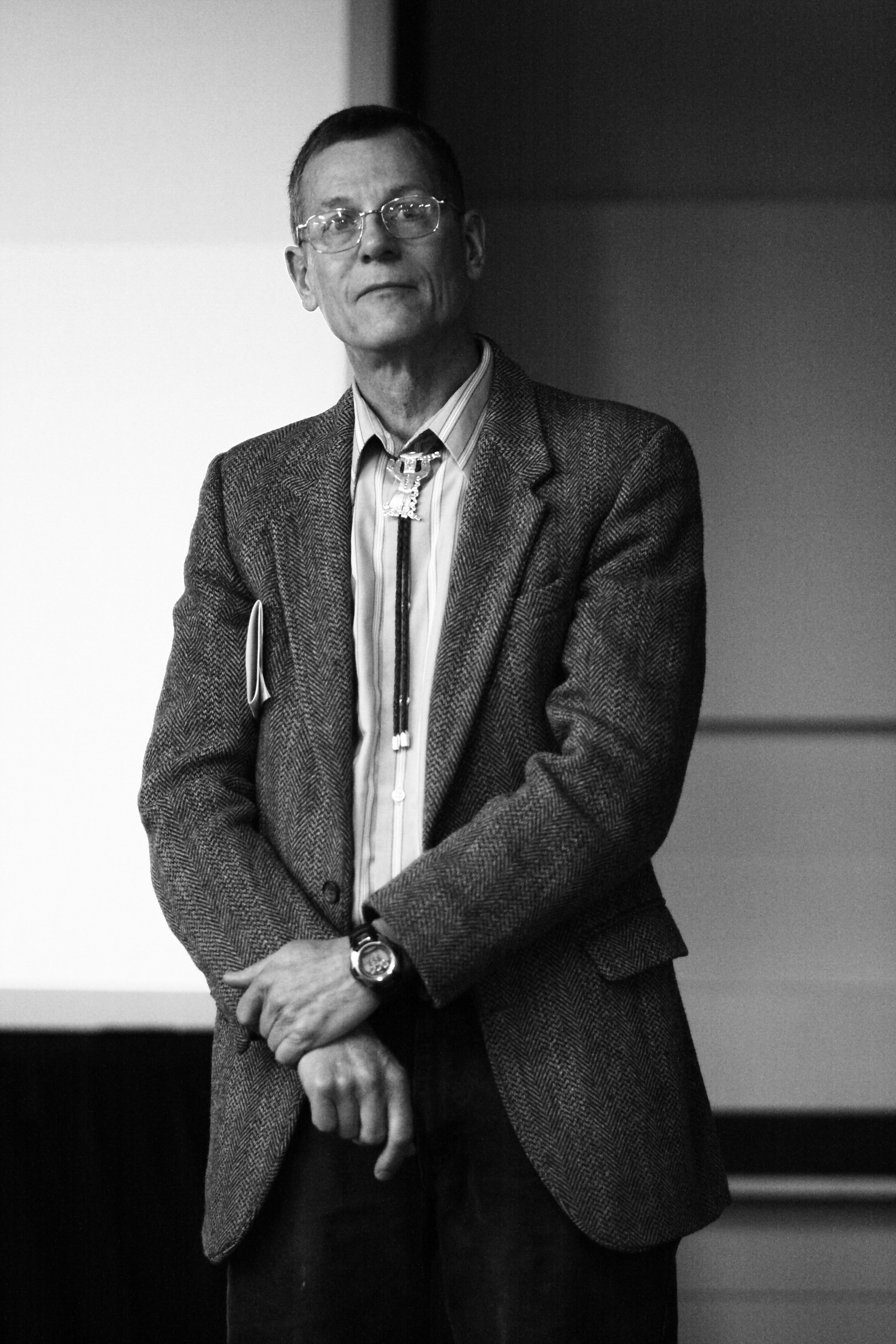
- Provine in 2008
- Born: February 19, 1942; Nashville, Tennessee, U.S.
- Died: September 1, 2015 (aged 73); Horseheads, New York, U.S.
- Education: University of Chicago (BS, MA, PhD)
- Employer: Cornell University

William Ball Provine (February 19, 1942 – September 1, 2015) was an American historian of science and of evolutionary biology and population genetics. He was the Andrew H. and James S. Tisch Distinguished University Professor at Cornell University and was a professor in the Departments of History, Science and Technology Studies, and Ecology and Evolutionary Biology.

== Biography ==
Provine was born in Tennessee. He held a B.S. in mathematics (1962), and an M.A. (1965) and Ph.D. (1970) in the history of science from the University of Chicago. He joined the Cornell faculty in 1969. He suffered seizures in 1995 due to a brain tumour. Provine died on September 1, 2015, due to complications from the tumor.

== History of theoretical population genetics ==
Provine's Ph.D. thesis, later published as a book, documented the early origins of theoretical population genetics in the conflicts between the biostatistics and Mendelian schools of thought. He documented later developments in theoretical population genetics in his biography of Sewall Wright, who was still alive and available for interviews. In this book, Provine criticizes Wright for confounding three different concepts of adaptive landscape: genotype to fitness landscapes, allele frequency to fitness landscapes, and phenotype to fitness landscapes. Provine later grew critical of Wright's views on genetic drift, instead attributing observed effects to the consequences of inbreeding and consequent selection at linked sites. John H. Gillespie credits Provine with stimulating his interest in the topic of hitchhiking or "genetic draft" as an alternative to genetic drift. Provine later published his critique of genetic drift in a book. Provine defended the importance of mathematics' contribution to the modern evolutionary synthesis.

== Education reform ==
In 1970, Provine was instrumental in the founding of Cornell's Risley Residential College. He was the first faculty member in residence.

== Philosophy ==
Provine was a philosopher, atheist, and critic of intelligent design. He engaged in prominent debates with theist philosophers and scientists about the existence of God and the viability of intelligent design. He debated the founder of the intelligent design movement, Phillip E. Johnson, and the two had a friendly relationship. Provine said that his course on evolutionary biology began by having his students read Johnson's book, Darwin on Trial.

Provine was a determinist, as he rejected the idea that humans exercise free will. Provine asserted that there is no evidence for the existence of God, no life after death, no absolute foundation for moral right and wrong, and no ultimate meaning or purpose for life. He was once a Presbyterian like his friend and intellectual rival Johnson, saying their worldviews had been much the same before he became an atheist.

== In popular culture ==
Professor Provine appeared in Ben Stein's movie Expelled: No Intelligence Allowed. Provine supervised the doctoral dissertation written by Bad Religion member Greg Graffin. Graffin was a student of history of science at Cornell. Provine also supervised Steve Leveen's sociology dissertation in 1982.

== Selected bibliography ==
- The Origins of Theoretical Population Genetics, 1971, ISBN 0-226-68465-2
- Mayr, E., and W. B. Provine, eds., The Evolutionary Synthesis: Perspectives on the Unification of Biology, 1980, ISBN 0-674-27225-0
- Sewall Wright and Evolutionary Biology, 1986, ISBN 0-226-68473-3
- Provine, W. B., ed., Evolution: Selected Papers by Sewall Wright, 1986, ISBN 0-226-91053-9
- "Geneticists and Race", American Zoologist, 1986, 26:857–87.
- "Progress in Evolution and Meaning in Life", in M. Nitecki, ed., Evolutionary Progress, 1989, ISBN 0-226-58692-8
- Cain, A. J., and W. B. Provine, "Genes and Ecology in History", in Berry, R. J., et al., eds., Genes in Ecology: 33rd Symposium of the British Ecological Society, 1992, ISBN 0-521-54936-1
- The "Random Genetic Drift" Fallacy, 2014, ISBN 9781500924126
