= Galactic habitable zone =

Region of a galaxy in which life might most likely develop

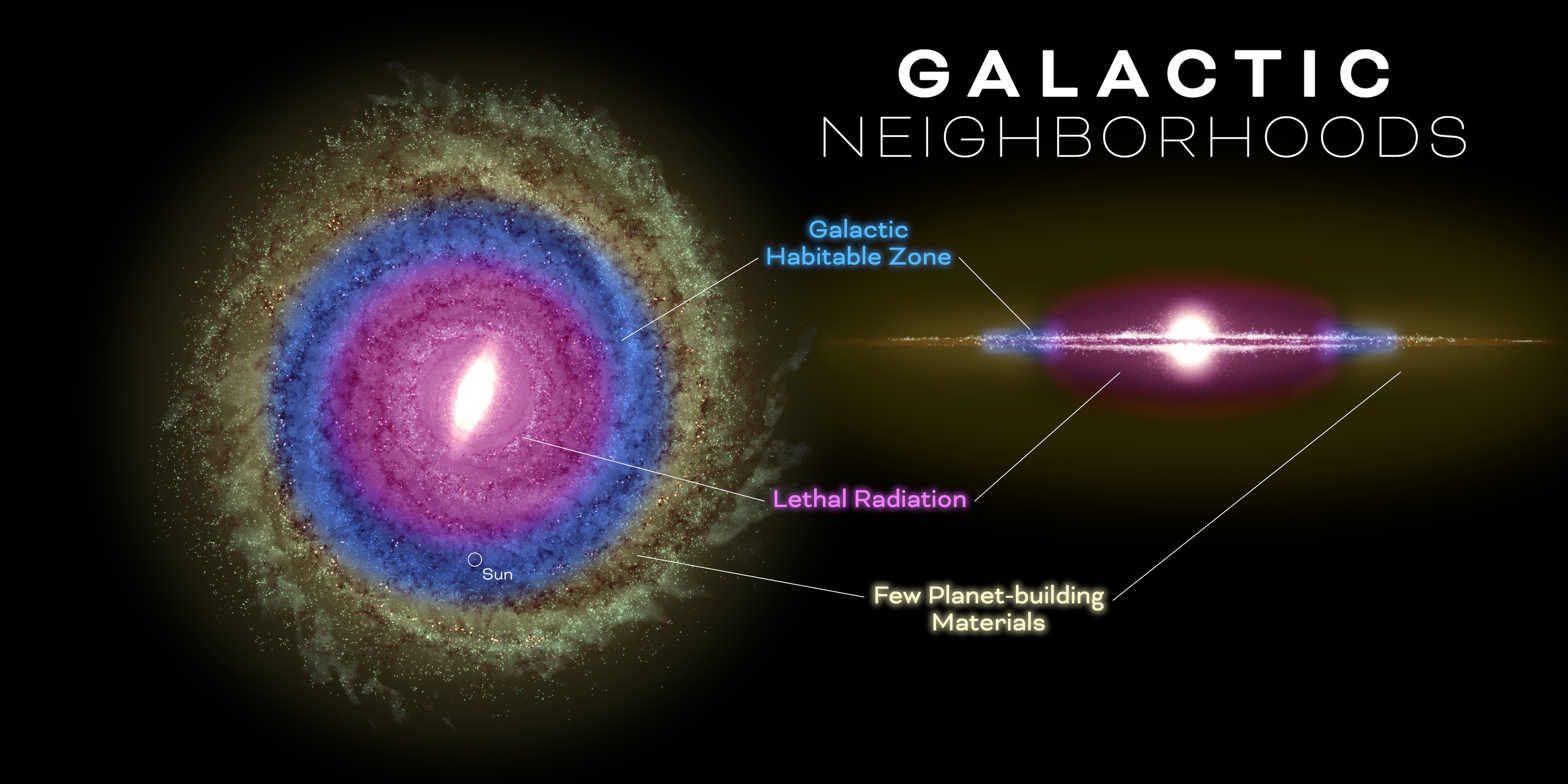
This infographic features artist's concept views of our Milky Way galaxy: face-on at the left and edge-on at the right. It highlights different galactic environments that could influence the development of planets and potentially life.

In astrobiology and planetary astrophysics, the galactic habitable zone is the region of a galaxy in which life is most likely to develop. The concept of a galactic habitable zone analyzes various factors, such as metallicity (the presence of elements heavier than hydrogen and helium) and the rate and density of major catastrophes such as supernovae, and uses these to calculate which regions of a galaxy are more likely to form terrestrial planets, initially develop simple life, and provide a suitable environment for this life to evolve and advance. According to research published in August 2015, very large galaxies may favor the birth and development of habitable planets more than smaller galaxies. In the case of the Milky Way, its galactic habitable zone is commonly believed to be an annulus with an outer radius of about 10 kiloparsecs (33,000 ly) and an inner radius close to the Galactic Center (with both radii lacking hard boundaries).

Galactic habitable-zone theory has been criticized due to an inability to accurately quantify the factors making a region of a galaxy favorable for the emergence of life. In addition, computer simulations suggest that stars may change their orbits around the galactic center significantly, therefore challenging at least part of the view that some galactic areas are necessarily more life-supporting than others.

== History ==
=== Background ===
The idea of the circumstellar habitable zone was introduced in 1953 by Hubertus Strughold and Harlow Shapley and in 1959 by Su-Shu Huang as the region around a star in which an orbiting planet could retain water at its surface. From the 1970s, planetary scientists and astrobiologists began to consider various other factors required for the creation and sustenance of life, including the impact that a nearby supernova may have on the development of life. In 1981, computer scientist Jim Clarke proposed that the apparent lack of extraterrestrial civilizations in the Milky Way could be explained by Seyfert-type outbursts from an active galactic nucleus, with Earth alone being spared from this radiation by virtue of its location in the galaxy. In the same year, Wallace Hampton Tucker analyzed galactic habitability in a more general context, but later work superseded his proposals.

Modern galactic habitable-zone theory was introduced in 1986 by L.S. Marochnik and L.M. Mukhin of the Russian Space Research Institute, who defined the zone as the region in which intelligent life could flourish. Donald Brownlee and palaeontologist Peter Ward expanded upon the concept of a galactic habitable zone, as well as the other factors required for the emergence of complex life, in their 2000 book Rare Earth: Why Complex Life is Uncommon in the Universe. In that book, the authors used the galactic habitable zone, among other factors, to argue that intelligent life is not a common occurrence in the Universe.

The idea of a galactic habitable zone was further developed in 2001 in a paper by Ward and Brownlee, in collaboration with Guillermo Gonzalez of the University of Washington. In that paper, Gonzalez, Brownlee, and Ward stated that regions near the galactic halo would lack the heavier elements required to produce habitable terrestrial planets, thus creating an outward limit to the size of the galactic habitable zone. Being too close to the galactic center, however, would expose an otherwise habitable planet to numerous supernovae and other energetic cosmic events, as well as excessive cometary impacts caused by perturbations of the host star's Oort cloud. Therefore, the authors established an inner boundary for the galactic habitable zone, located just outside the galactic bulge.

== Considerations ==
In order to identify a location in the galaxy as being a part of the galactic habitable zone, a variety of factors must be accounted for. These include the distribution of stars and spiral arms, the presence or absence of an active galactic nucleus, the frequency of nearby supernovae that can threaten the existence of life, the metallicity of that location, and other factors. Without fulfilling these factors, a region of the galaxy cannot create or sustain life with efficiency.

=== Chemical evolution ===
The metallicity of the thin galactic disk is far greater than that of the outlying galactic halo.

One of the most basic requirements for the existence of life around a star is the ability of that star to produce a terrestrial planet of sufficient mass to sustain it. Various elements, such as iron, magnesium, titanium, carbon, oxygen, silicon, and others, are required to produce habitable planets, and the concentration and ratios of these vary throughout the galaxy.

The most common benchmark elemental ratio is that of Fe/H, one of the factors determining the propensity of a region of the galaxy to produce terrestrial planets. The galactic bulge, the region of the galaxy closest to the Galactic Center, has an [Fe/H] distribution peaking at −0.2 decimal exponent units (dex) relative to the Sun's ratio (where −1 would be 1/10 such metallicity); the thin disk, in which local sectors of the local Arm are, has an average metallicity of −0.02 dex at the orbital distance of the Sun around the galactic center, reducing by 0.07 dex for every additional kiloparsec of orbital distance. The extended thick disk has an average [Fe/H] of −0.6 dex, while the halo, the region farthest from the galactic center, has the lowest [Fe/H] distribution peak, at around −1.5 dex. In addition, ratios such as [C/O], [Mg/Fe], [Si/Fe], and [S/Fe] may be relevant to the ability of a region of a galaxy to form habitable terrestrial planets, and of these [Mg/Fe] and [Si/Fe] are slowly reducing over time, meaning that future terrestrial planets are more likely to possess larger iron cores.

In addition to specific amounts of the various stable elements that comprise a terrestrial planet's mass, an abundance of radionuclides such as ^{40}K, ^{235}U, ^{238}U, and ^{232}Th is required in order to heat the planet's interior and power life-sustaining processes such as plate tectonics, volcanism, and a geomagnetic dynamo. The [U/H] and [Th/H] ratios are dependent on the [Fe/H] ratio; however, a general function for the abundance of ^{40}K cannot be created with existing data.

Even on a habitable planet with enough radioisotopes to heat its interior, various prebiotic molecules are required in order to produce life; therefore, the distribution of these molecules in the galaxy is important in determining the galactic habitable zone. A 2008 study by Samantha Blair and colleagues attempted to determine the outer edge of the galactic habitable zone by means of analyzing formaldehyde and carbon monoxide emissions from various giant molecular clouds scattered throughout the Milky Way; however, the data is neither conclusive nor complete.

While high metallicity is beneficial for the creation of terrestrial extrasolar planets, an excess amount can be harmful for life. Excess metallicity may lead to the formation of a large number of gas giants in a given system, which may subsequently migrate from beyond the system's frost line and become hot Jupiters, disturbing planets that would otherwise have been located in the system's circumstellar habitable zone. Thus, it was found that the Goldilocks principle applies to metallicity as well; low-metallicity systems have low probabilities of forming terrestrial-mass planets at all, while excessive metallicities cause a large number of gas giants to develop, disrupting the orbital dynamics of the system and altering the habitability of terrestrial planets in the system.

=== Catastrophic events ===
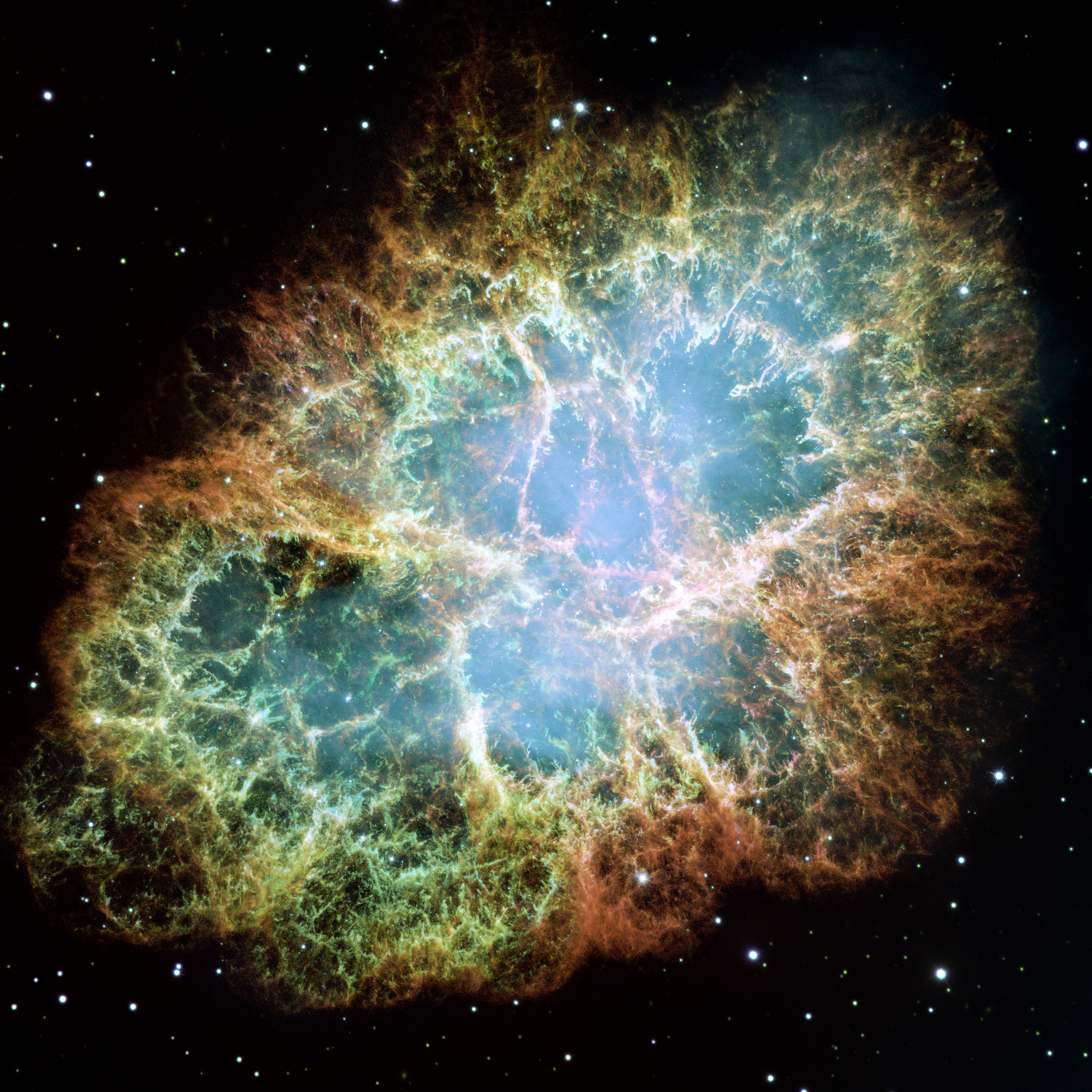
The impact of supernovae on the extent of the galactic habitable zone has been extensively studied.

As well as being in a region of the galaxy that is chemically advantageous for the development of life, a star must also avoid an excessive number of catastrophic cosmic events with the potential to damage life on its otherwise habitable planets. Nearby supernovae, for example, have the potential to severely harm life on a planet; with excessive frequency, such catastrophic outbursts have the potential to sterilize an entire region of a galaxy for billions of years. The galactic bulge, for example, experienced an initial wave of extremely rapid star formation, triggering a cascade of supernovae that for five billion years left that area almost completely unable to develop life.

In addition to supernovae, gamma-ray bursts, excessive amounts of radiation, gravitational perturbations and various other events have been proposed to affect the distribution of life within the galaxy. These include, controversially, such proposals as "galactic tides" with the potential to induce cometary impacts or even cold bodies of dark matter that pass through organisms and induce genetic mutations. However, the impact of many of these events may be difficult to quantify.

=== Galactic morphology ===
Various morphological features of galaxies can affect their potential for habitability. Spiral arms, for example, are the location of star formation, but they contain numerous giant molecular clouds and a high density of stars that can perturb a star's Oort cloud, sending avalanches of comets and asteroids toward any planets further in. In addition, the high density of stars and rate of massive star formation can expose any stars orbiting within the spiral arms for too long to supernova explosions, reducing their prospects for the survival and development of life. Considering these factors, the Sun is advantageously placed within the galaxy because, in addition to being outside a spiral arm, it orbits near the corotation circle, maximizing the interval between spiral-arm crossings.

Spiral arms also have the ability to cause climatic changes on a planet. Passing through the dense molecular clouds of galactic spiral arms, stellar winds may be pushed back to the point that a reflective hydrogen layer accumulates in an orbiting planet's atmosphere, perhaps leading to a snowball Earth scenario.

A galactic bar also has the potential to affect the size of the galactic habitable zone. Galactic bars are thought to grow over time, eventually reaching the corotation radius of the galaxy and perturbing the orbits of the stars already there. High-metallicity stars like the Sun, for example, at an intermediate location between the low-metallicity galactic halo and the high-radiation galactic center, may be scattered throughout the galaxy, affecting the definition of the galactic habitable zone. It has been suggested that for this reason, it may be impossible to properly define a galactic habitable zone.

== Boundaries ==
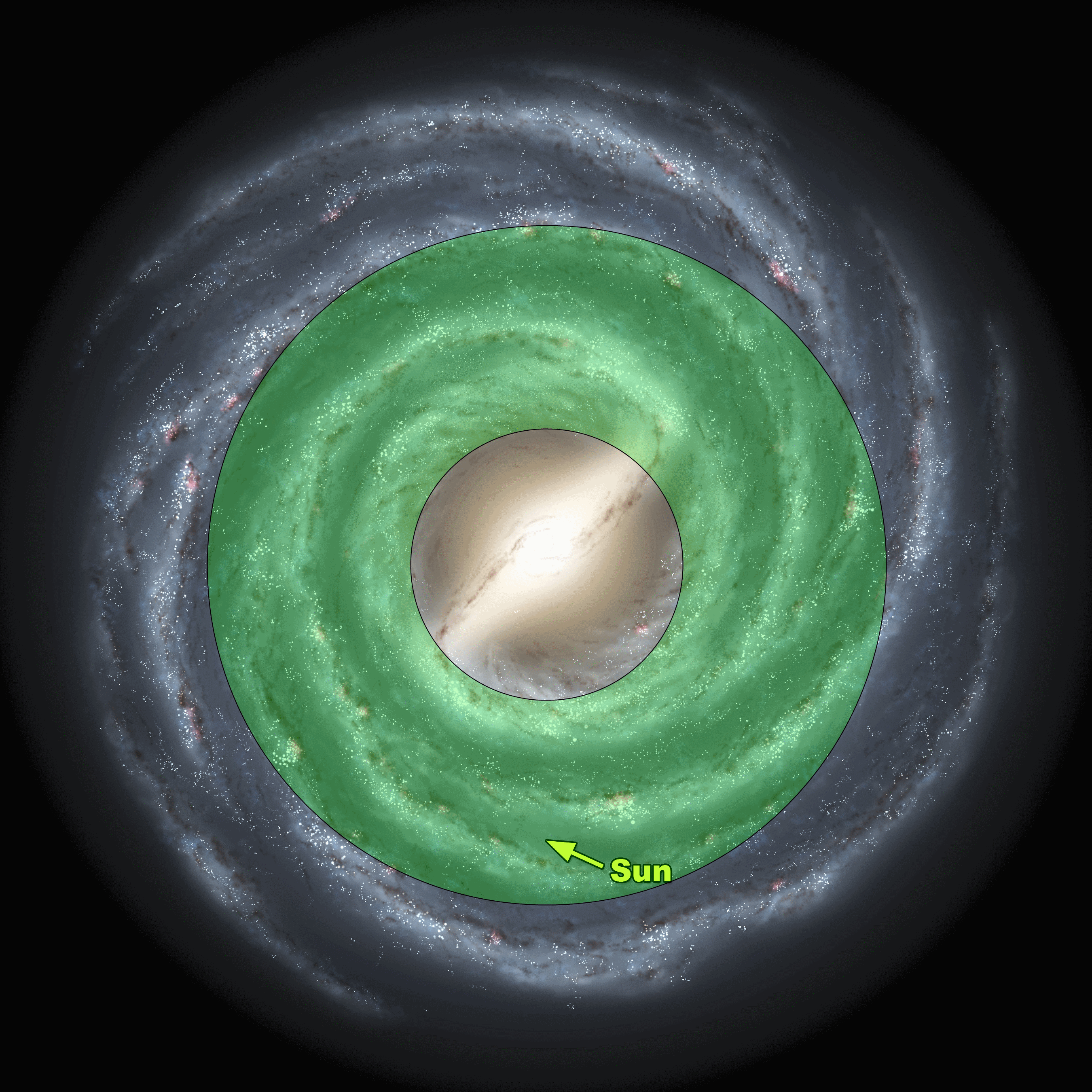
The galactic habitable zone is often viewed as an annulus 7-9 kpc from the galactic center, shown in green here, though recent research has called this into question.

Early research on the galactic habitable zone, including the 2001 paper by Gonzalez, Brownlee, and Ward, did not demarcate any specific boundaries, merely stating that the zone was an annulus encompassing a region of the galaxy that was both enriched with metals and spared from excessive radiation, and that habitability would be more likely in the galaxy's thin disk. However, later research conducted in 2004 by Lineweaver and colleagues did create boundaries for this annulus, in the case of the Milky Way ranging from 7 kpc to 9 kpc from the galactic center.

The Lineweaver team also analyzed the evolution of the galactic habitable zone with respect to time, finding, for example, that stars close to the galactic bulge had to form within a time window of about two billion years in order to have habitable planets. Before that window, galactic-bulge stars would be prevented from having life-sustaining planets from frequent supernova events. After the supernova threat had subsided, though, the increasing metallicity of the galactic core would eventually mean that stars there would have a high number of giant planets, with the potential to destabilize star systems and radically alter the orbit of any planet located in a star's circumstellar habitable zone. Simulations conducted in 2005 at the University of Washington, however, show that even in the presence of hot Jupiters, terrestrial planets may remain stable over long timescales.

A 2006 study by Milan Ćirković and colleagues extended the notion of a time-dependent galactic habitable zone, analyzing various catastrophic events as well as the underlying secular evolution of galactic dynamics. The paper considers that the number of habitable planets may fluctuate wildly with time due to the unpredictable timing of catastrophic events, thereby creating a punctuated equilibrium in which habitable planets are more likely at some times than at others. Based on the results of Monte Carlo simulations on a toy model of the Milky Way, the team found that the number of habitable planets is likely to increase with time, though not in a perfectly linear pattern.

Subsequent studies saw more fundamental revision of the old concept of the galactic habitable zone as an annulus. In 2008, a study by Nikos Prantzos revealed that, while the probability of a planet escaping sterilization by supernova was highest at a distance of about 10 kpc from the galactic center, the sheer density of stars in the inner galaxy meant that the highest number of habitable planets could be found there. The research was corroborated in a 2011 paper by Michael Gowanlock, who calculated the frequency of supernova-surviving planets as a function of their distance from the galactic center, their height above the galactic plane, and their age, ultimately discovering that about 0.3% of stars in the galaxy could today support complex life, or 1.2% if one does not consider the tidal locking of red dwarf planets as precluding the development of complex life.

== Criticism ==
The idea of the galactic habitable zone has been criticized by Nikos Prantzos, on the grounds that the parameters to create it are impossible to define even approximately, and that thus the galactic habitable zone may merely be a useful conceptual tool to enable a better understanding of the distribution of life, rather than an end to itself. For these reasons, Prantzos has suggested that the entire galaxy may be habitable, rather than habitability being restricted to a specific region in space and time. In addition, stars "riding" the galaxy's spiral arms may move tens of thousands of light years from their original orbits, thus supporting the notion that there may not be one specific galactic habitable zone. A Monte Carlo simulation, improving on the mechanisms used by Ćirković in 2006, was conducted in 2010 by Duncan Forgan of Royal Observatory Edinburgh. The data collected from the experiments support Prantzos's notion that there is no solidly defined galactic habitable zone, indicating the possibility of hundreds of extraterrestrial civilizations in the Milky Way, though further data will be required in order for a definitive determination to be made.

== See also ==
- Elliptical galaxy
- Extraterrestrial liquid water
- Fermi paradox
- Metallicity distribution function
- Planetary habitability
- Rare Earth hypothesis
- Search for extraterrestrial intelligence
- Spiral galaxy
- Terraforming
- Life habitable zones
