= Guillermo Gonzalez (astronomer) =

Cuban astrophysicist (born 1963)

- Born: 1963 (age 62–63); Havana, Cuba
- Citizenship: United States
- Education: University of Arizona (BS); University of Washington (PhD)
- Known for: Compositions of Exoplanet host stars
- Scientific career
- Fields: Stellar spectroscopy Stellar photometry
- Workplaces: University of Texas at Austin, University of Washington, Iowa State University, Ball State University
- Thesis: A Study of the UV-Bright Stars in omega CEN and the Type II Cepheid ST PUP (1993)
- Doctoral advisor: George Wallerstein

Guillermo Gonzalez (born 1963) is a Cuban-born American astronomer. He is a research scientist at the University of Alabama in Huntsville. He is a proponent of intelligent design, a pseudoscientific argument for the existence of God. He is a senior fellow of the Discovery Institute's Center for Science and Culture, which is considered the hub of the intelligent design movement, and a fellow with the International Society for Complexity, Information and Design, which also promotes intelligent design.

== Education and career ==
Gonzalez obtained a B.S. in 1987 in physics and astronomy from the University of Arizona and his Ph.D. in astronomy from the University of Washington in 1993. He has done post-doctoral work at the University of Texas, Austin and the University of Washington. He has received fellowships, grants and awards from NASA, the University of Washington, Sigma Xi, and the National Science Foundation. He supports the Galactic habitable zone concept, which was coined in 1986 by L.S. Marochnik and L.M. Mukhin, who defined the zone as the region in which intelligent life could flourish. Until May 2008 he was an assistant professor in the Department of Physics and Astronomy at Iowa State University, then taught at Grove City College, an evangelical Christian school, and since 2013 is an assistant professor at Ball State University in Muncie.

Gonzalez was a regular contributor to Facts for Faith magazine produced by Reasons To Believe, an old Earth creationist group. In addition to his work for the Discovery Institute and International Society for Complexity, Information, and Design, he is a researcher for the Biologic Institute, which is funded by the institute for research into intelligent design.

In 2004 he published The Privileged Planet and its accompanying video, which takes the arguments of the Rare Earth hypothesis and combines them with arguments that the Earth is in prime location for observing the universe. He then proposes that the Earth was intelligently designed. William H. Jefferys, a professor of astronomy at the University of Texas at Austin, reviewed the book writing "the little that is new in this book isn't interesting, and what is old is just old-hat creationism in a new, modern-looking astronomical costume." Co-author Jay Richards responds to such criticism with the following statement: "It has absolutely nothing to do with biological evolution. We are talking about the things that you need to produce a habitable planet, which is a prerequisite for life. It doesn't tell you anything about how life got here." A documentary based on the book was produced by the Discovery Institute.

His primary research interest is studying radial velocity and transit techniques for the detection of extrasolar planets.

== Iowa State University tenure denial ==
=== Faculty statement ===
Two years prior to his consideration for tenure, approximately 130 members of the faculty of Iowa State University signed a statement co-authored by associate professors James Colbert and Hector Avalos and assistant professor Michael Clough opposing "all attempts to represent Intelligent Design as a scientific endeavor." Similar statements were issued by faculty at the University of Northern Iowa and at the University of Iowa. A total of approximately 400 professors signed the three petitions. No mention of Gonzalez was made in these petitions, and the professors maintained the statement "was in no way targeted specifically at Gonzalez", that Tom Ingebritsen, an associate professor in the Department of Genetics, Development and Cell Biology, had been advocating, and teaching a course in, Intelligent Design at ISU for a number of years before Gonzales arrived, and that "[a]t that time [the] statement began to circulate, Dr. Gonzalez was not well-known as an ID advocate to most faculty even at ISU". Avalos also criticized the Discovery Institute for "combining sentences from different sections of [the statement] in order create a fragmented syntax that appears to target Gonzalez":

Here is [sic] the three original sentences, snippets of which were recombined by the Discovery Institute:

1. Intelligent Design has become a significant issue in science education, and it has now established a presence, even if minimal, at Iowa State University.
2. Accordingly, if you are concerned about the negative impact of Intelligent Design on the integrity of science and on our university, please consider signing the "Statement on Intelligent Design by Iowa State University Faculty" below.
3. We, therefore, urge all faculty members to uphold the integrity of our university of "science and technology," convey to students and the general public the importance of methodological naturalism in science, and reject efforts to portray Intelligent Design as science.

[emphasis in original]

Two years later, an article in the local newspaper The Waterloo-Cedar Falls Courier reported Gonzalez's appeal against his denial of tenure and claimed he was "the unnamed target" of the ISU petition. The article noted that "Gonzalez won't discuss the reasons for the tenure denial" but that he "noted...that he has frequently been criticized by people who don't consider intelligent design as a legitimate science." Comments from John West, the associate director of the Discovery Institute's Center for Science and Culture – at which Gonzalez was a senior fellow – blamed the failure to secure tenure directly upon Gonzalez's belief in intelligent design and compared it to a "doctrinal litmus test" typical of his native Cuba.

=== Denial of tenure and appeals ===
In April 2007 Iowa State University denied Gonzalez tenure.

On June 1, 2007, Gregory Geoffroy, president of Iowa State University, rejected Gonzalez's appeal and upheld the denial of tenure. In making this decision, Geoffroy states that he "specifically considered refereed publications, [Gonzalez's] level of success in attracting research funding and grants, the amount of telescope observing time he had been granted, the number of graduate students he had supervised, and most importantly, the overall evidence of future career promise in the field of astronomy" and that Gonzalez "simply did not show the trajectory of excellence that we expect in a candidate seeking tenure in physics and astronomy – one of our strongest academic programs." Geoffroy noted, "Over the past 10 years, four of the 12 candidates who came up for review in the physics and astronomy department were not granted tenure." Gonzalez appealed to the Iowa Board of Regents and the board affirmed the decision on February 7, 2008.

=== Reasons for denial ===
The university has issued an FAQ concerning the situation saying that "The consensus of the tenured department faculty, the department chair, the College of Liberal Arts and Sciences, the dean of Liberal Arts and Sciences, and the executive vice president and provost was that tenure should not be granted. Based on recommendations against granting tenure and promotion at every prior level of review, and his own review of the record, President Gregory Geoffroy notified Gonzalez in April that he would not be granted tenure and promotion to associate professor." The denial of tenure for Gonzalez resulted in one of the Discovery Institute intelligent design campaigns with the institute encouraging its followers to call and email Geoffroy and urge him to reverse the decision.

The Chronicle of Higher Education said of Gonzalez and the Discovery Institute's claims of discrimination "At first glance, it seems like a clear-cut case of discrimination ... But a closer look at Mr. Gonzalez's case raises some questions about his recent scholarship and whether he has lived up to his early promise." The Chronicle observed that Gonzalez had no major grants during his seven years at ISU, had published no significant research during that time and had only one graduate student finish a dissertation. The Discovery Institute misrepresents an op-ed by John Hauptman, one of Gonzalez's colleagues in the physics department. Hauptman states clearly that Gonzalez's work falls far short of what scientists know to be science, containing not one single number, not one single measurement or test of any kind. "I believe that I fully met the requirements for tenure at ISU," said Gonzalez. On May 8, 2007, Gonzalez appealed the decision.

Gonzalez's failure to obtain research funding has been cited as a factor in the decision. "Essentially, he had no research funding," said Eli Rosenberg, chairman of Gonzalez's department. "That's one of the issues." According to the Des Moines Register, "Iowa State has sponsored $22,661 in outside grant money for Gonzalez since July 2001, records show. In that same time period, Gonzalez's peers in physics and astronomy secured an average of $1.3 million by the time they were granted tenure." On February 7, 2008, his appeal to the board of regents was denied.

=== Discovery Institute and intelligent design campaign ===
The Discovery Institute launched a campaign portraying Gonzalez as a victim of discrimination by "Darwinist ideologues" for his support of intelligent design, comparing Gonzalez's denial of tenure to the claims of discrimination by Richard Sternberg, another institute affiliate, over the Sternberg peer review controversy. The institute's public relations campaign also makes the same claims of discrimination as the campaign it conducted on behalf of institute Fellow Francis J. Beckwith when he was initially denied tenure at Baylor University.

The Discovery Institute filed a request for public records and as a result, in December 2007, Des Moines Register obtained faculty email records from 2005 that included discussions of intelligent design, and made mention of the impact that Gonzalez's support for it might have on his prospects for tenure. Emails included one by John Hauptman who worried that the anti-Gonzalez sentiments were "starting to smack of a witch's hanging." Hauptman went on to vote against Gonzalez's tenure purely on the grounds that his work did not come close to being science, for example, the only numbers in his book were the page numbers. The Discovery Institute writes that the email records "demonstrate that a campaign was organized and conducted against Gonzalez by his colleagues, with the intent to deny him tenure". In a letter to the Iowa State Daily, Physics and Astronomy Professor Joerg Schmalian stated that the e-mail "discussion was prompted by our unease with the national debate on intelligent design", not the issue of tenure.

Observers such as PZ Myers have stated that the Discovery Institute's statement "relies heavily on fragmentary quotes taken from emails that they obtained through an open records inquiry", that the "entire anti-evolution movement" has a track-record of taking quotations out of context, that "the DI has not made the full text of the sources available for examination", leading to a "reluctan[ce] to accept the quotes provided at face value", and that in any case "[t]his is precisely what his colleagues are supposed to do: discuss concerns about his tenure case." A review and analysis of the list of Gonzalez's publications supplied by the Discovery Institute found that "he peaked in 1999, and the decline [in his publications] began even while he was still at the University of Washington" and that "[e]ven more pronounced than the drop in publications is the complete bottom-out in first authorships that is almost sustained throughout his entire probationary period leading up to tenure." Another academic commented:

How can Gonzalez complain if his work on ID was considered? If intelligent design is scientific, his department is entitled to judge his work in that field. If ID is not science, it's fair to question why their faculty member is spending so much of his time and resources on it. The claims of persecution issuing from the Discovery Institute and Dr. Gonzalez require that intelligent design be both science and religion. This isn't about science, it's about politics.

— Tara C. Smith, assistant professor of epidemiology, University of Iowa, president, Iowa Citizens for Science

Additionally, Gonzalez appeared in the 2008 documentary-style propaganda film Expelled: No Intelligence Allowed. The American Association for the Advancement of Science describes the film as dishonest and divisive, aimed at introducing religious ideas into public school science classrooms, and the film is being used in private screenings to legislators as part of the Discovery Institute intelligent design campaign for Academic Freedom bills. Expelled portrays Gonzalez as a victim of religious discrimination and the Discovery Institute campaign asserts that his intelligent design writings should not have been considered in the review. However, Gonzales listed The Privileged Planet as part of his tenure review file. Dr. Gregory Tinkler of Iowa Citizens for Science stated that "Being a religious scientist is perfectly normal and acceptable, but scientists are supposed to be able to separate science from non-science, and good research from bad. Academic freedom protects a scientist's ability to do science, not to pass off a political or religious crusade as science."

=== Colleagues speak out ===
One of Gonzalez's colleagues, physics professor Joerg Schmalian wrote "To deny tenure to a colleague is a very painful experience. It literally causes sleepless nights to those who are forced to make a responsible decision. Faculty candidates who are being hired in our department always come with promising backgrounds and terrific accomplishments. The decision to recommend or deny tenure is then predominantly based on research performance while at Iowa State. As far as I can judge, this was no different in Gonzalez's case. What I know with certainty is that Gonzalez's views on intelligent design, with which I utterly disagree, had no bearing whatsoever on my vote on his tenure case."

== Grove City College ==
In late 2007, Gonzalez accepted a non-tenure track position in the astronomy program of the Grove City College in Pennsylvania starting in fall semester 2008. Grove City College acquired an observatory from Edinboro University of Pennsylvania in February 2008 that will be utilized for astronomy classes as well as faculty and student research.

== Ball State University ==
On 12 June 2013, Ball State University in Muncie, Indiana, announced it had engaged Gonzalez as an assistant professor in the department of physics and astronomy. At the time, the university was already investigating a complaint that another assistant professor in that department, Eric Hedin, had been promoting intelligent design in an honors symposium titled "The Boundaries of Science". Concerns about the teaching of religion in science courses had been raised by academics, including professor of biology Jerry Coyne, who commented on the new hire that if Gonzales "wants to talk about it in his writing and speeches, he has a right to do that. But he can't pass that stuff off in a university classroom. He doesn't have the right to get tenure working in discredited science." The university's investigation into Hedin had begun following a letter from the Freedom from Religion Foundation, whose attorney said that the university "already has a serious issue with creationism being taught as science" by Hedin, "Now they've hired another astronomy professor and creationist to teach science at their university, Gonzalez", and this pattern could damage the university's reputation as well as involving the administration in work "to ensure that proper legal, ethical, and educational boundaries are followed by Gonzalez." The Discovery institute's Evolution News and Views website published a statement Guillermo Gonzalez had issued about his new position as a faculty member:

I am very happy to join the Department of Physics and Astronomy at Ball State University. As I communicated to members of the department during my interviews, I plan to continue my research on astrobiology and stellar astrophysics. I will not be discussing intelligent design (ID) in my classes (I didn't discuss ID at ISU either). My view that there is evidence of design in physics and cosmology (the type of design I have written about) is not out of the mainstream; a number of cosmologists and physicists hold to this view. In my opinion, the controversy surrounding my hire is artificial -- largely generated by one activist blogger who is not an astronomer. Lastly, I need to reiterate that I was denied tenure at ISU not because of poor academics on my part, but for ideological and political reasons."

At the end of July, Professor Jo Ann Gora as president of the university stated that science courses would not include teaching intelligent design and that Hedin would remain on the staff, but his symposium would not continue. She issued a letter to faculty and staff advising that "Intelligent design is overwhelmingly deemed by the scientific community as a religious belief and not a scientific theory" and that "Said simply, to allow intelligent design to be presented to science students as a valid scientific theory would violate the academic integrity of the course as it would fail to accurately represent the consensus of science scholars."

The Discovery Institute had meetings with Indiana Senator Dennis Kruse, chairman of the Education Committee, and three of his fellow Republican legislators. The legislators, acting on behalf of the Discovery Institute, wrote to the university to raise concerns about the decision, including the "establishment of a speech code restricting faculty speech on intelligent design" and demanding that Gora answer the question, "Does the policy forbid science professors from explaining either their support or rejection of intelligent design in answer to questions about intelligent design in class?" The Discovery Institute's vice president John G. West alleged that "one science class is covering intelligent design in order to bash it. If they allow that, it's tantamount to state endorsement of an anti-religious view."

The Discovery Institute also sought access to any emails between the university and Coyne to investigate their suspicions that a faculty member had contacted Coyne to sabotage the hiring of Gonzalez: Coyne described this as "crazy" and said "I made it clear I didn't think Guillermo Gonzalez or Eric Hedin should be fired. The question was whether religion can be taught as if it were science. Like president Gora said, it's not only wrong but illegal to represent religion as if it were science." He also commented that "The Discovery Institute is hurt because they lost, so they're trying to make trouble. This is a watershed thing, the first time the issue of intelligent design came up in a university as opposed to a high school or elementary school. Ball State was the first time they tried, and it failed."

== Books ==
- The Privileged Planet: How Our Place in the Cosmos Is Designed for Discovery (co-author Jay Richards), Regnery Publishing, Inc., Washington D.C., March 2004, ISBN 0-89526-065-4
- Observational Astronomy (co-authors D. Scott Birney, David Oesper) Cambridge University Press, 2006, ISBN 978-0-521-85370-5
- (contributor) The Case for a Creator: A Journalist Investigates Scientific Evidence That Points Toward God (2004), Zondervan, ISBN 0-310-26386-7
