= The Privileged Planet =

2004 book by Guillermo Gonzalez and Jay Richards

- Cover
- Authors: Guillermo Gonzalez; Jay Richards
- Language: English
- Subject: Intelligent design
- Publisher: Regnery Publishing
- Publication date: Hardback March 2004, Paperback 2006
- Publication place: United States
- Media type: Print (Hardcover and Paperback)
- Pages: 464
- ISBN: 0-89526-065-4
- OCLC: 54046478
- Dewey Decimal: 523.2 22
- LC Class: QB501 .G66 2004

The Privileged Planet: How Our Place in the Cosmos is Designed for Discovery is a 2004 book by Guillermo Gonzalez and Jay Richards, in which the authors claim scientific evidence for intelligent design. Both Gonzalez and Richards are associated with the Discovery Institute, identified with the intelligent design movement; Gonzalez works as a senior fellow of the Discovery Institute's Center for Science and Culture.

== Reception ==
This book has proven to be highly controversial within the scientific community.

Positive reviews:
Owen Gingerich, astronomer and historian of science, reviews the book explaining "This thoughtful, delightfully contrarian book will rile up those who believe the 'Copernican principle' is an essential philosophical component of modern science. Is our universe designedly congenial to intelligent, observing life? Passionate advocates of the search for extraterrestrial intelligence (SETI) will find much to ponder in this carefully documented analysis."

Philip Skell reviewed the book writing "In this fascinating and highly original book, Guillermo Gonzalez and Jay Richards advance a persuasive argument, and marshal a wealth of diverse scientific evidence to justify that argument. In the process, they effectively challenge several popular assumptions, not only about the nature and history of science, but also about the nature and origin of the cosmos. The Privileged Planet will be impossible to ignore. It is likely to change the way we view both the scientific enterprise and the world around us. I recommend it highly."

Negative reviews:
William H. Jefferys, an astronomer, reviewed the book writing "the little that is new in this book isn't interesting, and what is old is just old-hat creationism in a new, modern-looking astronomical costume."

Victor J. Stenger, a physicist and philosopher, reviewed the book explaining that it not only "ignores" the 2000 book Rare Earth (written by Gonzalez's Washington colleagues paleontologist Peter Ward and astronomer Donald E. Brownlee), but it goes against "the consensus of astrobiologists in adopting the Rare Earth position."

== Film ==
The book served as the basis for a movie by the same name. The Institute donated $16,000 to the Smithsonian Institution, which according to policy, must allow a special event on its premises. The Institute chose to show the film at the National Museum of Natural History in Washington, D.C. The Smithsonian withdrew its cosponsorship, stating: "We have determined that the content of the film is not consistent with the mission of the Smithsonian Institution's scientific research." They allowed the film to be shown but turned down the payment.

Charles G. Lambdin reviewed the film, concluding that while life on planets may be remote, there are a lot of planets and "Using Gonzalez and Richard’s own odds of habitability, this suggests that there may be one billion habitable planets due to chance alone." He also argued that the film's claim that the fact that we can do science at all suggests the universe was designed so that we can understand it is no different than the old quip that the nose must have been designed so that we can wear spectacles.

According to IMDb, it is distributed and produced by Illustra Media and Randolph Productions.

== Tenure controversy ==
The Institute has alleged that the book is "at the heart of the attacks on Iowa State University astronomer Guillermo Gonzalez" and played a role in his denial of tenure and that it provoked 124 of Gonzalez's faculty colleagues to sign a petition in 2005 denouncing intelligent design and urging all other faculty members to do the same. The statement did not mention Guillermo Gonzalez or his involvement with the creationism movement, and faculty members, including Hector Avalos have denied that the statement was directed at Guillermo Gonzalez.
