= Rare Earth: Why Complex Life Is Uncommon in the Universe =

2000 book by Peter Ward and Donald E. Brownlee

- Authors: Peter D. Ward; Donald E. Brownlee
- Language: English
- Subject: Astrobiology
- Publisher: Copernicus
- Publication date: 2000
- Publication place: United States
- Media type: Print
- Pages: 338 pp.
- ISBN: 978-0387952895

Rare Earth: Why Complex Life Is Uncommon in the Universe is a 2000 popular science book about xenobiology by Peter Ward, a geologist and evolutionary biologist, and Donald E. Brownlee, a cosmologist and astrobiologist. The book is the origin of the term 'Rare Earth Hypothesis' which denotes the central claim of the book: that complex life is rare in the universe.

== Synopsis ==
Ward and Brownlee argue that the universe is fundamentally hostile to complex life and that while microbial life may be common in the universe, complex intelligent life (like the evolution of biological complexity from simple life on Earth) requires an exceptionally unlikely set of circumstances, and therefore complex life is likely to be extremely rare.

They argue that among the essential criteria for complex life are a terrestrial planet with plate tectonics and oxygen, a large moon, magnetic field, a gas giant like Jupiter for protection and an orbit in the habitable zone of the right kind of star. Additionally, events during the Earth's geological past such as Snowball Earth, the Cambrian Explosion, and the various mass extinction events that nearly destroyed life on Earth arguably make the existence and survival of complex life rare as well. They also suggest that animal life, having taken hundreds of millions of years to evolve, unlike bacteria, which were the first life to appear on Earth, is extremely fragile to sudden and severe changes in the environment, and therefore is very prone to becoming extinct very easily and quickly within a short period of geological time, while microbial life is much more resilient to such changes.

The authors also argue that due to the immense size of the universe, even if another habitable planet like Earth does exist elsewhere, meaning that the Earth is not the only planet in the universe with complex life, such planets would still only appear in relatively small numbers compared to planets that are habitable only to bacteria. Such planets most likely would be too far away for any intelligent lifeforms, if they exist, to make contact with each other as well as with our own planet, as the vast distances between those planets would essentially isolate them. By the time any signals reach their destination, the planet the signal originated from may no longer be habitable anymore except for bacteria, and whatever life that sent said signal may already be extinct, making any form of contact between planets with intelligent life unattainable.

Finally, the authors warn about the current degradation of the Earth's biosphere due to human activities, suggesting that human beings' destruction of various animal species on Earth may represent the loss of a significant portion of complex life within the universe.

== Reception ==
Rare Earth attracted substantial attention, both in the media and academically. It has been cited by many subsequent articles in the field of geology and astrobiology. Christopher McKay wrote a positive review titled 'All Alone After All?', in the journal Science. The Times proclaimed it as an answer to the Copernican Principle. Discover described it as a "a wet blanket for E.T. enthusiasts". The book's rationale was also praised by media outlets including Newsday and The Economist. CNN described it as an answer to the Fermi paradox. Several astronomy sources also praised the book including Sky & Telescope and Astronomy magazine. Other science media also praised the book including American Scientist, Popular Mechanics, and Physics Today. Ward & Brownlee's Rare Earth Hypothesis has been further popularised in books along the same theme.

It was not without its critics, however. While initially declaring it a "must read", the geoscientist James Kasting wrote a highly critical reply in the journal Perspectives in Biology and Medicine, challenging its restrictive criteria. Several books were written in reply including Evolving the Alien by Jack Cohen, who described Ward and Brownlee's assumption as restrictive and unimaginative; and a form of circular reasoning. The book Life Everywhere by David Darling was also written largely in reply to Rare Earth and Darling describes it as neither a hypothesis nor prediction, but merely "a description of how life arose on Earth" having selected the factors that best suit the case.

What matters is not whether there's anything unusual about the Earth; there's going to be something idiosyncratic about every planet in space. What matters is whether any of Earth's circumstances are not only unusual but also essential for complex life. So far we've seen nothing to suggest there is.

According to Robert K. Logan there is very little surprise as to why the book received significant interest from the neo-creationism movement. While Ward & Brownlee attribute this exceptional unlikeliness to chance, many within the movement regard this as evidence of an intelligent designer. Many subsequent intelligent design advocates have been inspired by Rare Earth including Guillermo Gonzalez who wrote the book The Privileged Planet promoting the concept of intelligent design. Gonzalez coined the term Galactic Habitable Zone based on the work 'The Galactic Habitable Zone: Galactic Chemical Evolution', a collaboration with Ward & Brownlee.

== Follow-on book ==
Rare Earth was succeeded in 2003 by the follow-on book The Life and Death of Planet Earth: How the New Science of Astrobiology Charts the Ultimate Fate of our World, also by Ward and Brownlee, which talks about the Earth's long-term future and eventual demise under a warming and expanding Sun, showing readers the concept that planets like Earth have finite lifespans, and that complex and especially intelligent life is not just rare in space, but also rare in time, and is more likely to die out relatively soon and rather quickly within a short period of time on geological timescales, even more so with the latter, while microbes are expected to survive much longer, and therefore dominate most of the planet's history, and being the first life to appear, will likely also be the last life to ultimately remain and then disappear.

== See also ==
- Planetary habitability
- Drake Equation

== Sources ==
- Darling, David (2001). Life Everywhere: The Maverick Science of Astrobiology. Basic Books/Perseus. ISBN 0-585-41822-5.
- Gonzalez, Guillermo; Brownlee, Donald; Ward, Peter (July 2001). "The Galactic Habitable Zone: Galactic Chemical Evolution". Icarus. 152 (1): 185–200. arXiv:astro-ph/0103165. Bibcode:2001Icar..152..185G. doi:10.1006/icar.2001.6617. S2CID 18179704.
- Kasting, James (2001). "Peter Ward and Donald Brownlee's "Rare Earth"". Perspectives in Biology and Medicine. 44 (1): 118–120. doi:10.1353/pbm.2001.0008. S2CID 72900092.
- Ward, Peter D.; Brownlee, Donald (2000). Rare Earth: Why Complex Life is Uncommon in the Universe. Copernicus Books (Springer Verlag). ISBN 978-0-387-98701-9.
