= Wallace Hampton Tucker =

American environmentalist

Wallace Hampton Tucker is an American award-winning playwright, and an active environmentalist.

== Early life ==
Tucker was born in McAlester, Oklahoma of partial Choctaw descent. He graduated from McAlester High School where he met his future wife, Karen.

== Education ==
Tucker attended the University of Oklahoma and where he earned his bachelor's degree in mathematics and Master's in physics. He continued his education from there and received his Ph.D. in physics from the University of California, San Diego in 1966.

He has been active in environmental work, helping to found and lead two nonprofit organizations in Southern California: the Fallbrook Land Conservancy (FLC) and the San Diego Land Conservation Coalition. The FLC was formed in 1988. It has acquired and manages over 1850 acres of open space on 10 preserves throughout San Diego County.
