= Paul Lauer =

American entrepreneur, marketer, and author

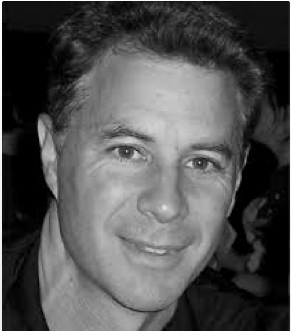
- Born: March 19, 1962 (age 63)
- Website: http://motiveentertainment.biz

Paul Lauer is an American entrepreneur, marketer, and author. He is the Founder, President, and CEO of Motive Entertainment, a Los Angeles based marketing and content development company.

== Career ==
Lauer designed and executed the grassroots marketing campaigns for Mel Gibson's The Passion of the Christ, The Chronicles of Narnia, Polar Express, Rocky Balboa, Mark Burnett's The Bible Series and Son of God.

Lauer has been noted as one of Advertising Age's Top 50 Marketers of the Year. He also founded YOU! Magazine for teens (published in six languages with 3,800,000 copies distributed) and has produced the World Youth Day Music Festival for 100,000+ attendees (Denver, 1993), produced documentary television, and co-authored four books.
