= PCID2 =

Protein-coding gene in the species Homo sapiens

Available structures
PDB	Ortholog search: PDBe RCSB
PDB	List of PDB id codes 3T5X

Identifiers
- Aliases: PCID2, F10, PCI domain containing 2
- External IDs: OMIM: 613713; MGI: 2443003; HomoloGene: 10168; GeneCards: PCID2; OMA:PCID2 - orthologs

Gene location (Human)
Chr.	Chromosome 13 (human)
Band	13q34	Start	113,177,536 bp
Band	13q34	End	113,208,715 bp

Gene location (Mouse)
Chr.	Chromosome 8 (mouse)
Band	8|8 A1.1	Start	13,127,189 bp
Band	8|8 A1.1	End	13,155,459 bp
RNA expression pattern
Bgee	Human / Mouse (ortholog); Top expressed in: oocyte; secondary oocyte; left ovary; right ovary; left testis; right testis; canal of the cervix; body of uterus; cerebellar hemisphere; right hemisphere of cerebellum / Top expressed in: Ileal epithelium; perirhinal cortex; entorhinal cortex; choroid plexus of fourth ventricle; lactiferous gland; otic placode; CA3 field; otic vesicle; saccule; internal carotid artery; More reference expression data
BioGPS	n/a
Gene ontology
Molecular function	protein binding; double-stranded DNA binding; RNA binding
Cellular component	nuclear pore; transcription export complex 2; cellular component; nucleus; cytoplasm; nuclear pore nuclear basket
Biological process	positive regulation of B cell differentiation; positive regulation of transcription, DNA-templated; positive regulation of mitotic cell cycle spindle assembly checkpoint; negative regulation of apoptotic process; spleen development; regulation of mRNA stability; negative regulation of cysteine-type endopeptidase activity; posttranscriptional tethering of RNA polymerase II gene DNA at nuclear periphery; transcription elongation from RNA polymerase II promoter; poly(A)+ mRNA export from nucleus; protein transport; mRNA transport
Sources:Amigo / QuickGO
Orthologs
Species	Human	Mouse
Entrez	55795	234069
Ensembl	ENSG00000126226	ENSMUSG00000038542
UniProt	Q5JVF3	Q8BFV2
RefSeq (mRNA)	NM_001127202; NM_001127203; NM_001258212; NM_001258213; NM_018386 NM_001320655; NM_001320656; NM_001320657; NM_001320659; NM_001320660; NM_001353091; NM_001353092; NM_001353093; NM_001353094; NM_001353095	NM_178708
RefSeq (protein)	NP_001120674; NP_001120675; NP_001245142; NP_001307584; NP_001307585 NP_001307586; NP_001307588; NP_001307589; NP_060856; NP_001340020; NP_001340021; NP_001340022; NP_001340023; NP_001340024	NP_848823
Location (UCSC)	Chr 13: 113.18 – 113.21 Mb	Chr 8: 13.13 – 13.16 Mb
PubMed search
- Wikidata
View/Edit Human	View/Edit Mouse

PCI domain containing 2 is a protein that in humans is encoded by the PCID2 gene.

== Function ==
This gene encodes a component of the TREX-2 complex (transcription and export complex 2), which regulates mRNA export from the nucleus. This protein regulates expression of Mad2 mitotic arrest deficient-like 1, a cell division checkpoint protein. This protein also interacts with and stabilizes Brca2 (breast cancer 2) protein. Alternative splicing results in multiple transcript variants. [provided by RefSeq, Mar 2016].
