= William H. Jefferys =

American astronomer

- Education: Yale University
- Scientific career
- Fields: Astronomy
- Workplaces: University of Texas at Austin
- Thesis: Some Dynamical Systems of Two Degrees of Freedom in Celestial Mechanics (1965)
- Doctoral advisor: Gen'ichirō Hori
- Website: quasar.as.utexas.edu

William Hamilton Jefferys III (born 1940) is an American astronomer. He is the Harlan J. Smith Centennial Professor Emeritus in Astronomy at the University of Texas at Austin, and an adjunct professor of statistics at the University of Vermont.

Jefferys specialized in astrometry, celestial mechanics, and astrophysics, including the kinematics and dynamics of astronomical bodies. He has also worked in the field of Bayesian statistics, particularly with astronomical applications. He was the Hubble Space Telescope Astrometry Science Team leader, and participated in the project that repaired the Hubble Space Telescope after the discovery of its initial optical defect.

Jefferys served as chairman of The University of Texas Department of Astronomy from 1994 to 1998. He retired from the University of Texas in 2004 and moved to Vermont in 2005, where he accepted an appointment as adjunct professor of statistics at the University of Vermont.
