= Ben Stein =

American writer and commentator (born 1944)

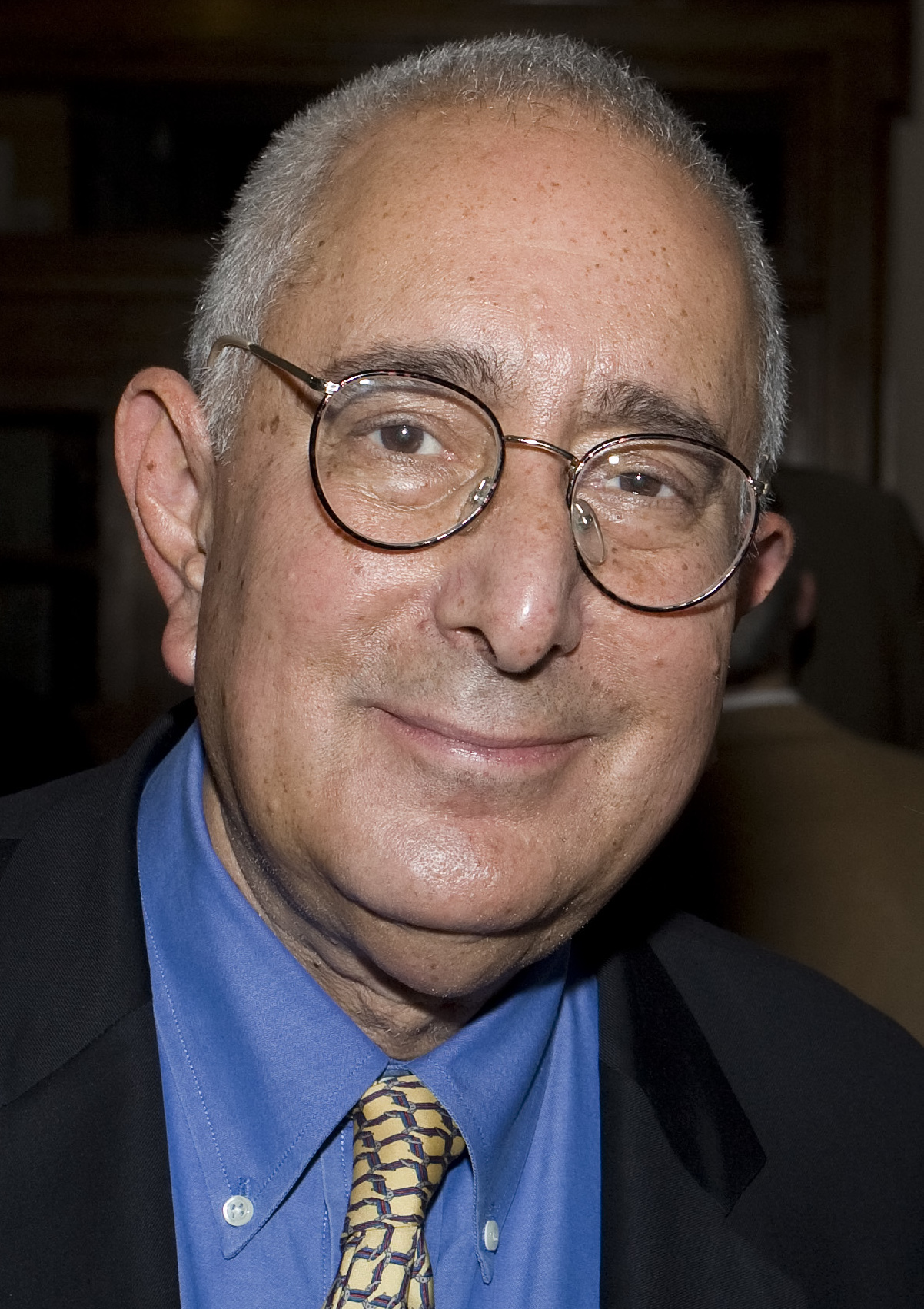
- Stein at Murray State University in 2011
- Born: Benjamin Jeremy Stein; November 25, 1944 (age 81); Washington, D.C., U.S.
- Education: Columbia University (BA); Yale University (JD)
- Occupations: Writer; lawyer; economist; actor; comedian; political commentator
- Years active: 1970–present (writer and lawyer); 1986–present (actor and comedian)
- Television: Win Ben Stein's Money
- Political party: Republican
- Spouses: Alexandra Denman (m. 1968; div. 1974) (m. 1977)
- Father: Herbert Stein
- Website: benstein.com

Benjamin Jeremy Stein (born November 25, 1944) is an American writer, lawyer, actor, economist, comedian, and commentator on political and economic issues. He began his career as a speechwriter for U.S. presidents Richard Nixon and Gerald Ford before entering the entertainment field as an actor, comedian, and game show host. His screen roles include the economics teacher in Ferris Bueller's Day Off, being the host of Win Ben Stein's Money, and as Dr. Arthur Neuman in The Mask and Son of the Mask. Stein also co-wrote and starred in the controversial 2008 film Expelled which was widely criticized for promoting pseudoscientific intelligent design creationist claims. Stein is the son of economist and writer Herbert Stein, who worked at the White House under President Nixon. As an actor, he is known for his droning, monotonous delivery. In comedy, Stein is known for his deadpan delivery.

== Early life and education ==
Benjamin Jeremy Stein was born on November 25, 1944, in Washington, D.C., the son of Jewish parents Mildred (née Fishman), a homemaker, and Herbert Stein, a writer, economist, and presidential adviser. He grew up in the Woodside Forest neighborhood of Silver Spring, Maryland. Stein graduated in 1962 from Montgomery Blair High School, which journalist Carl Bernstein (class of 1960) and actress Goldie Hawn (class of 1963) also attended. He graduated from Columbia University with a Bachelor of Arts in economics in 1966. As undergraduate, he studied under economist C. Lowell Harriss and was a member of the Philolexian Society. He then earned his Juris Doctor in 1970 from Yale Law School, where he was elected valedictorian of his class. While at Yale, he studied finance under economists Jan Deutsch and Henry Wallich.

== Career ==
=== Legal and academic career ===
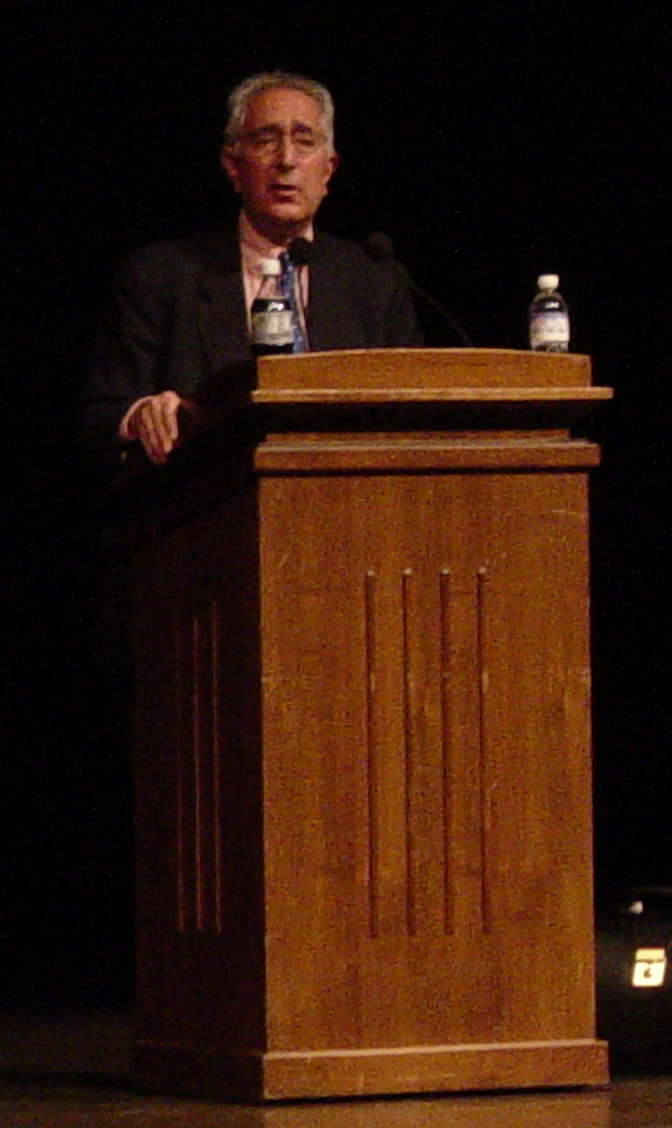
Stein speaking at Miami University in 2003

He was first a poverty lawyer in New Haven, Connecticut, and Washington, D.C., before becoming a trial lawyer for the Federal Trade Commission.

Stein's first teaching stint was as an adjunct professor, teaching about the political and social content of mass culture at American University in Washington, D.C. He subsequently taught classes at the University of California, Santa Cruz on political and civil rights under the Constitution of the United States. At Pepperdine University Stein taught libel law and United States securities law and its ethical aspects. He was a professor of law and economics at Pepperdine University Law School from about 1990 to 1997.

=== Writing career ===
Stein writes a regular column in the conservative media outlets The American Spectator and Newsmax. He has also written for numerous publications, including The Wall Street Journal, The New York Times, New York Magazine, Penthouse, Los Angeles Magazine, and Barron's Magazine. He wrote a regular biweekly column for Yahoo! Finance online, with his last article dated August 7, 2009. His bestselling books (with investment advisor Phil DeMuth) include Yes, You Can Retire Comfortably; Can America Survive?; and Yes, You Can Time the Market. In 2009, he published a collection of essays, The Real Stars.

Stein was fired from his position as a Sunday Business columnist at The New York Times in August 2009 owing to a policy prohibiting writers from making product endorsements or advertising. Stein had recently become an advertising spokesman for credit information company Freescore.com and, according to a Times statement, had assumed there would be no conflict provided that he did not discuss credit scoring in general or FreeScore.com itself in his column. However, the publication felt that it would be inappropriate for him to write for them while he was involved in advertising and terminated his contract. Writing in The Spectator, Stein states his belief that the real reasons for his firing were budget cuts at the Times, his criticism of Obama, and pressure from those critical of Expelled, who "bamboozled some of the high pooh-bahs at the Times into thinking there was a conflict of interest".

=== Political career ===
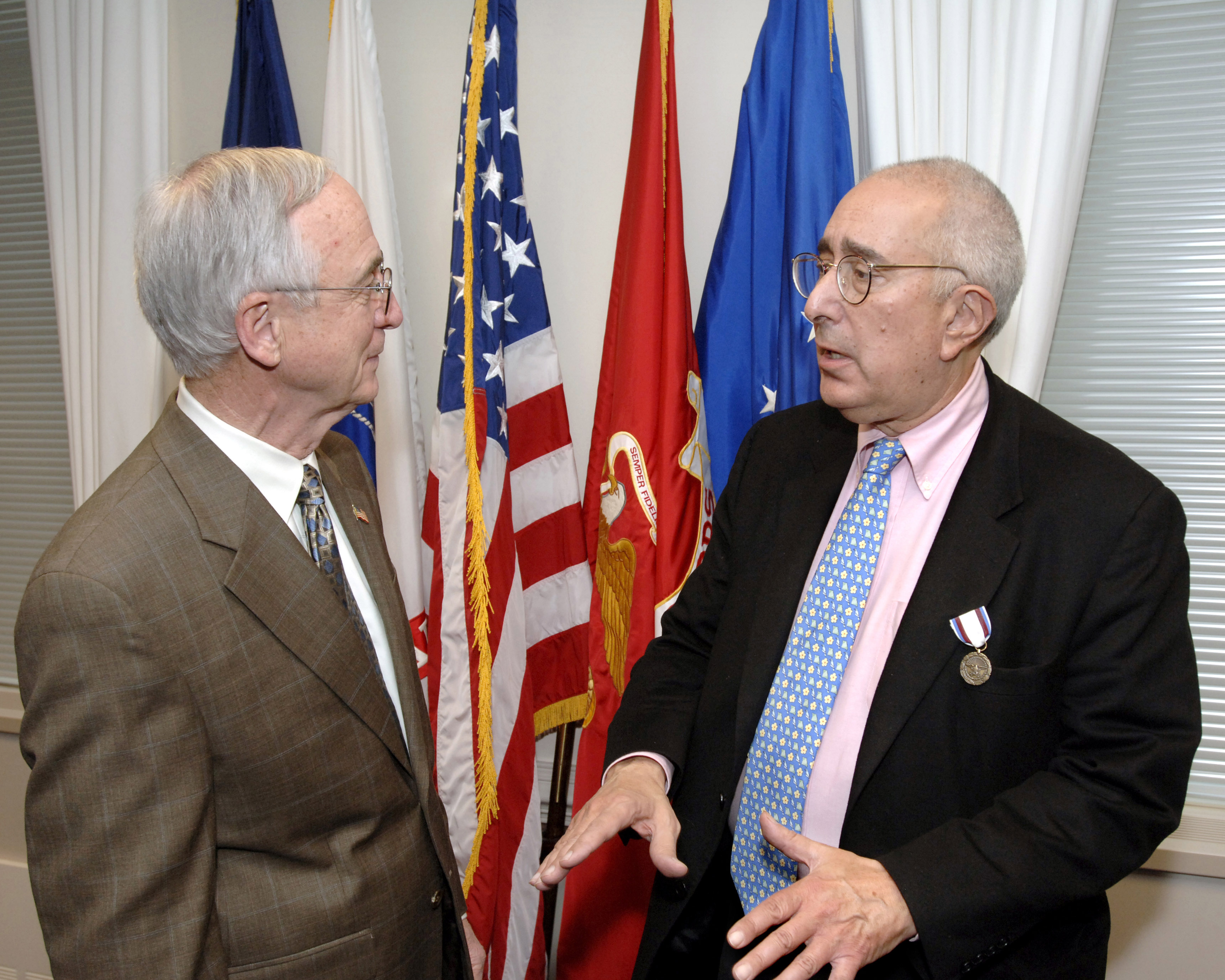
Stein with United States Deputy Secretary of Defense Gordon R. England in 2008

Stein began his political career as a speechwriter and lawyer for President Richard Nixon, and later for President Gerald Ford. On May 3, 1976, Time magazine speculated on the possibility of Stein having actually been Deep Throat. Stein responded over the years not only by denying he was Deep Throat but by going further and accusing journalist Bob Woodward of falsifying the famous secret source. In the May 14–21, 1998, edition of the Philadelphia City Paper, Stein is quoted as saying, "Oh, I don't think there was a Deep Throat. That was a fake. I think there were several different sources and some they just made up." After Mark Felt's identity as Deep Throat was revealed, Stein stated that Nixon would have prevented the rise to power of the Khmer Rouge if he had not been forced to resign. For his actions leading to that resignation, Stein said:

If there is such a thing as karma, if there is such a thing as justice in this life or the next, Mark Felt has bought himself the worst future of any man on this earth. And Bob Woodward is right behind him, with Ben Bradlee bringing up the rear. Out of their smug arrogance and contempt, they hatched the worst nightmare imaginable: genocide.

In 2005, Stein said in the American Spectator:

Can anyone even remember now what Nixon did that was so terrible? He ended the war in Vietnam, brought home the POWs, ended the war in the Mideast, opened relations with China, started the first nuclear weapons reduction treaty, saved Eretz Israel's life, started the Environmental Protection Agency. Does anyone remember what he did that was bad?

Oh, now I remember. He lied. He was a politician who lied. How remarkable. He lied to protect his subordinates who were covering up a ridiculous burglary that no one to this date has any clue about its purpose. He lied so he could stay in office and keep his agenda of peace going. That was his crime. He was a peacemaker and he wanted to make a world where there was a generation of peace. And he succeeded.

That is his legacy. He was a peacemaker. He was a lying, conniving, covering up peacemaker. He was not a lying, conniving drug addict like JFK, a lying, conniving war starter like LBJ, a lying, conniving seducer like Clinton—a lying, conniving peacemaker.

=== Career in the media ===
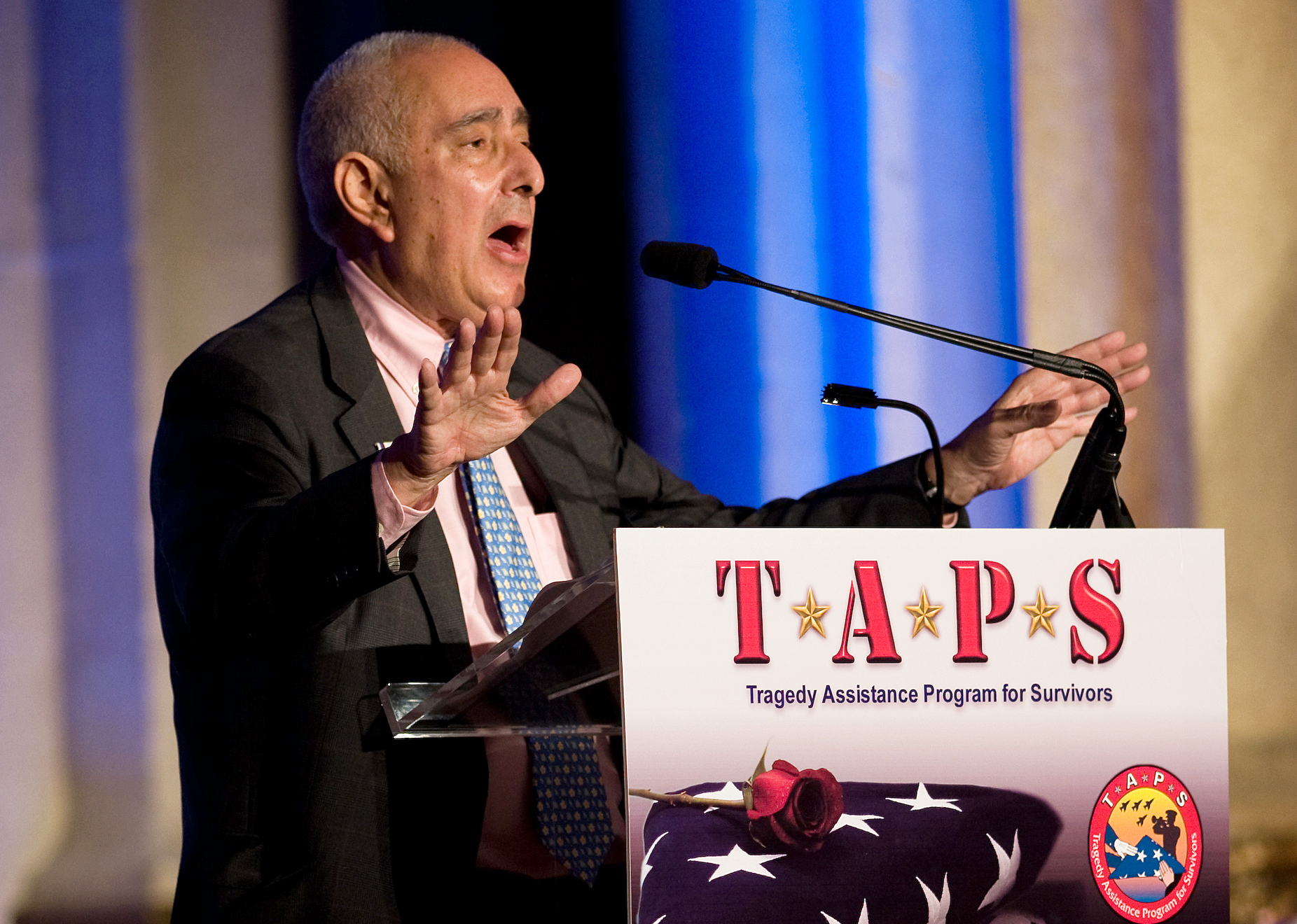
Stein speaks at a gala in honor of the Tragedy Assistance Program for Survivors in 2008.

Stein acted as the monotonous economics teacher in the 1986 movie Ferris Bueller's Day Off. In one scene, he lectures on the Smoot-Hawley Tariff of 1930 and the then-current debate over supply-side economics.

Stein played similarly bland and unemotional characters. He had a recurring role in the TV series The Wonder Years as science teacher Mr. Cantwell, who would narrate 16 mm films in monotone. Stein also played himself in Dave.

He appeared in several television advertisements, such as for Clear Eyes eye drops throughout the 1990s and 2000s, Godfather's Pizza in 1987, a bland science teacher in 1990 for Sprinkled Chips Ahoy! cookies, and in 2013 for small business accounting service firm 1-800Accountant.

From 1997 to 2003, Stein hosted the Comedy Central game show Win Ben Stein's Money along with co-host Jimmy Kimmel (replaced by Nancy Pimental and later by Sal Iacono). True to its name, the money that contestants won on the show was subtracted from the $5,000 pay that Stein earned per episode (in addition to his salary). The show won five Daytime Emmy Awards before ending its run in 2003.

In 1999, Stein also hosted the Comedy Central talk show Turn Ben Stein On. One of the mainstays of the show was Stein's dog, Puppy Wuppy, who had free run of the set. In 2001, Stein appeared on a celebrity episode of The Weakest Link entitled "TV Hosts Edition" alongside other television hosts and was voted off in round 6 despite being that round's Strongest Link. Anne Robinson's quip was that while he "might win Ben's money; you're NOT taking ours!".

Other movies and television shows in which Stein has appeared include Charles in Charge; Seinfeld; Full House; Casper; Casper: A Spirited Beginning; Casper Meets Wendy; The Mask and its sequel, Son of the Mask as well as the television show, The Mask: Animated Series; Earthworm Jim; Star Search; MacGyver; Tales from the Crypt; Richie Rich; Game Show Moments Gone Bananas; Cavuto on Business; The O'Reilly Factor; CBS News Sunday Morning; Planes, Trains and Automobiles; Family Guy; the 1998–2004 version of Hollywood Squares; the Michael Berger-hosted version of Match Game; The Fairly OddParents; Duckman; Married... with Children; The Emperor's New School; My Girl 2; Ghostbusters II; and the intelligent design documentary Expelled: No Intelligence Allowed.

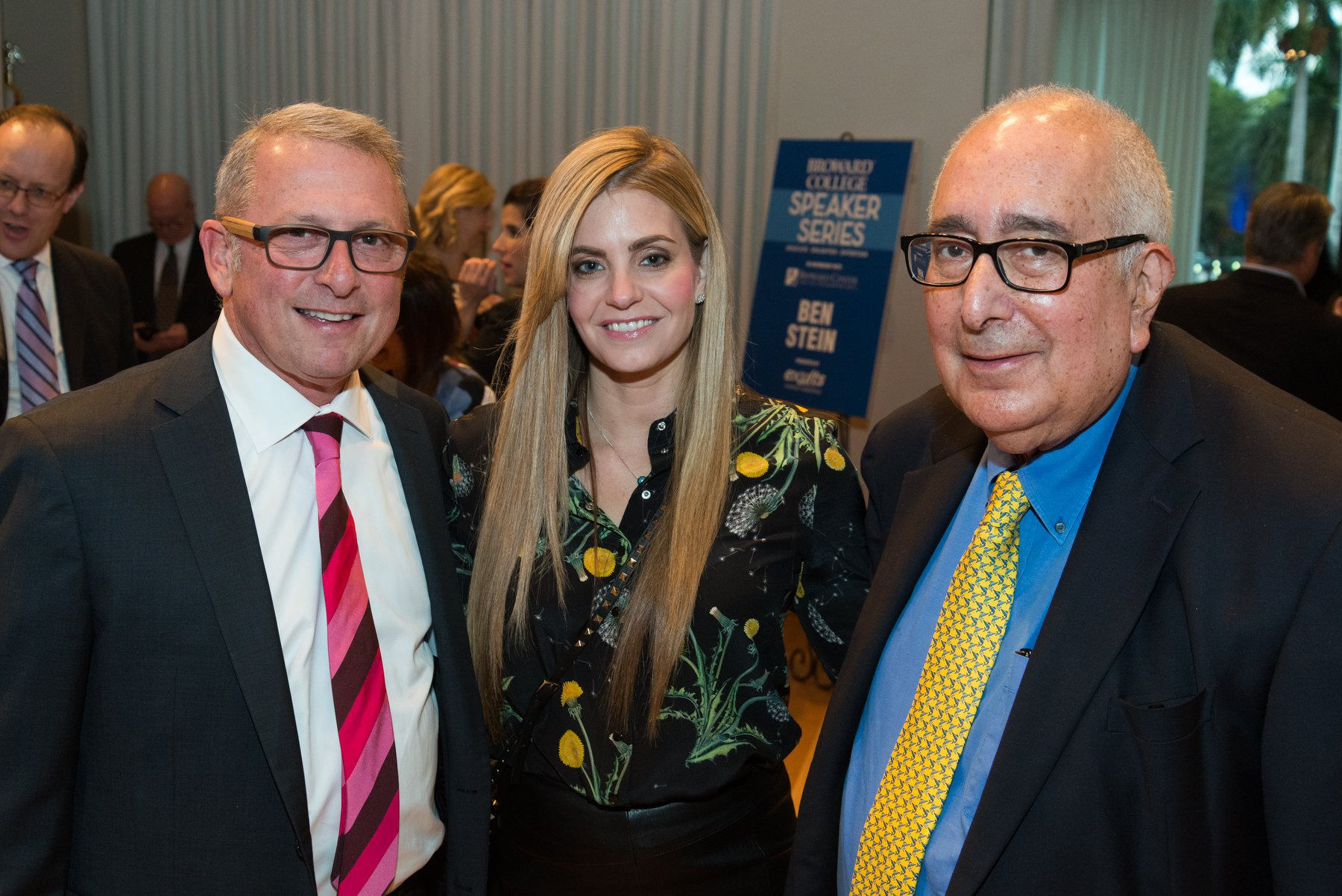
Stein (right) with Carl and Rachel Lender of Lender's Bagels in 2019

In addition, Stein's voice roles include The Pixies, magical creatures on the animated series The Fairly OddParents; Mr. Purutu on the animated series The Emperor's New School; Professor Wisenstein in Bruno the Kid; the birthday party clown, Mr. Giggles, on The Adventures of Jimmy Neutron, Boy Genius; a bingo caller on Rugrats; Francis "Pip" Pumphandle in Animaniacs; and H.A. Futterman in Freakazoid!. Stein also voiced a psychiatrist, again named after himself, in the USA TV series Duckman; he once appeared in the sitcom Married... with Children as a receptionist in the animal afterlife. He also made a cameo appearance in the comic book Young Justice, as Ali Ben Styn. Another cameo appearance was as Rabbi Goldberg in the Family Guy episodes "When You Wish Upon a Weinstein" and "Family Goy". Stein also voiced the character Sam Schmaltz in the 1996 computer adventure game Toonstruck.

Stein has written for the television industry, including outlines for the TV movie Murder in Mississippi and for the lengthy ABC miniseries Amerika. He has also contributed to the creation of the talk show parody series Fernwood 2 Night.

Stein hosted a show on VH1 called America's Most Smartest Model. The show aimed to find the smartest among 14 models through a series of challenges.

On May 14, 2006, during an appearance on the Fox News program Your World with Neil Cavuto, Stein called for a tax increase of 3.5% for wealthy Americans, to be earmarked for soldiers and military initiatives. Stein wrote an editorial for The New York Times critical of those who would rather make money in the world of finance than fight terrorism.

On December 28, 2009, Stein appeared on CNN's Larry King Live with Ron Paul to discuss the attempted bombing of an American plane on Christmas Day 2009. Stein said that Paul's stance that the United States were "occupiers" in Iraq and Afghanistan was antisemitic. The comment started a shouting match between the two men. Two days later, Stein clarified that "if Rep. Paul says he is... not an anti-Semite, I believe him".

Stein's political and economics commentary has appeared on CNBC's The Kudlow Report and CNN.

=== Commentary in the lead-up to and during the Great Recession ===
In the months before the Great Recession, Stein made frequent and vehement claims about the economy's good health and the relative unimportance of the mortgage-derivative market; these would shortly be proven dead wrong.

Examples include:

- On March 18, 2007, as the subprime mortgage crisis began, Stein wrote a column for the online version of CBS News Sunday Morning. He proclaimed that the foreclosure problem would "blow over and the people who buy now, in due time, will be glad they did," that the economy was "still very strong," and that the "smart money" was "now trying to buy—not sell—as much distressed merchandise" in mortgages as possible.
- In an August 12, 2007, column in The New York Times, titled "Chicken Little's Brethren, on the Trading Floor", Stein—while acknowledged that "I don't know where the bottom is on subprime. I don't know how bad the problems are at Bear [Bear Stearns]"—claimed that "subprime losses are wildly out of all proportion to the likely damage to the economy from the subprime problems," and "[t]his economy is extremely strong. Profits are superb. The world economy is exploding with growth. To be sure, terrible problems lurk in the future: a slow-motion dollar crisis, huge Medicare deficits and energy shortages. But for now, the sell-off seems extreme, not to say nutty. Some smart, brave people will make a fortune buying in these days, and then we'll all wonder what the scare was about."
- On August 18, 2007, on Fox News Channel's Cavuto on Business, Stein and other financial experts dismissed worries about a coming credit crunch. Thirteen months later, at the peak of the 2008 financial crisis, global stock markets crashed, Lehman Brothers went bankrupt, Fannie Mae and Freddie Mac were taken over by the US government, AIG was bailed out by the Federal Reserve, Merrill Lynch was sold to Bank of America Corporation, and Morgan Stanley and Goldman Sachs confirmed that they would become traditional bank holding companies.

In January 2008, business commentator Henry Blodget wrote a piece for Business Insider entitled, "Ben Stein is an Idiot", which stated that Stein's criticism of those with bearish views and positions on the market was either "delusional" or a deliberate and "shrewd" attempt to create false controversy and increase web traffic.

In a Yahoo Finance article published on October 17, 2008, Stein said his wildly incorrect claims were due to his expectations that the real-estate market would roughly resemble the collapse of junk bonds in the early 1990s. He said he failed to understand that debt obligations based on real estate loans were less than the "staggeringly large" amount of obligations that were created through trading in derivatives of those: "Where I missed the boat was not realizing how large were the CDS [credit default swaps] based on the junk mortgage bonds."

== Personal life ==
Stein is married to entertainment lawyer Alexandra Denman. They were married in 1968 and divorced in 1974. They reconciled and in 1977 they were married again. Stein lives with Denman in Beverly Hills and Malibu, California. He also has a summer home in Sandpoint, Idaho, and an apartment in the Watergate complex in Washington, D.C., which he inherited from his parents.

== Views and advocacy ==
=== Abortion ===
Stein is opposed to legalized abortion and was given an award in 2003 by the National Right to Life Educational Trust Fund.

=== Larry Craig scandal ===
In 2007, Stein chastised the police and the GOP leadership for their response to the Larry Craig scandal. Stein said that Craig's sexuality should not be an issue: "A party that believes in individual rights should be rallying to his defense, not making him walk the plank."

=== Tax code ===
Stein has criticized the United States Internal Revenue Code for being too lenient on the wealthy. He has repeated the observation made by Warren Buffett, one of the richest individuals in the world (who pays mostly capital gains tax), that Buffett pays a lower overall tax rate than his secretaries (who pay income taxes and payroll taxes). Stein has advocated increasing taxation on the wealthy. Stein objected to Obama's proposal in 2010 not to extend tax cuts for the highest earning taxpayers in the midst of the recession, saying that:

There is no known economic theory under which raising my taxes in the midst of a severe recession will help the economy recover. It isn't part of any well known monetarist or Keynesian theory. So if it does no good to raise our taxes, I assume we are being punished. But for what? I don't own slaves. I employ a lot of people full- and part-time and they are all happy with their pay. When charity calls, I almost always write out a check...Maybe when the economy recovers, raising my taxes makes sense, but for now, it's just punishment.

In 2012, Stein stated that due to the tremendous amount of national debt, he agreed with Obama's proposal to increase taxes on the wealthy and that ultimately everyone's taxes should be raised to avoid defaulting on the debt.

=== Dominique Strauss-Kahn ===
When the head of the International Monetary Fund, Dominique Strauss-Kahn, was arrested for sexual assault and attempted rape in 2011, Stein published an editorial in The American Spectator in which he closely scrutinized Strauss-Kahn's accuser and cited Strauss-Kahn's education, wealth, and position as reasons to believe he was unlikely to have committed the crime:

In life, events tend to follow patterns. People who commit crimes tend to be criminals, for example. Can anyone tell me any economists who have been convicted of violent sex crimes?

Stein's editorial was criticized by a number of media outlets. Jon Stewart dedicated an entire segment on The Daily Show to his response. All charges against Dominique Strauss-Kahn were formally dismissed by a judge on August 23, 2011.

=== Ferguson shooting ===
In response to the death of Michael Brown, Stein made the following comment:

The idea of calling this poor young man unarmed when he was 6'4", 300 pounds, full of muscles, apparently, according to what I read in The New York Times, on marijuana. To call him unarmed is like calling Sonny Liston unarmed or Cassius Clay unarmed. He wasn't unarmed. He was armed with his incredibly strong, scary self.

=== Evolution ===
Stein has denounced the scientific theory of evolution, which he and other intelligent design advocates call "Darwinism", declaring it to be "a painful, bloody chapter in the history of ideologies", "the most compelling argument yet for Imperialism", and the inspiration for the Holocaust. Stein does not say belief in evolution alone leads to genocide, but that scientific materialism is a necessary component. He co-wrote and stars in Expelled: No Intelligence Allowed, a film that aims to persuade viewers that evolution was instrumental to the rise of the eugenics movement, Nazi Germany, and the Holocaust, and portrays advocates of intelligent design as victims of intellectual discrimination by the scientific community, which has rejected intelligent design as creationist pseudoscience. In the trailer for the film, Stein said that his aim was to expose "people out there who want to keep science in a little box where it can't possibly touch God."

Many critics point out that Stein selectively used and edited quotes by Charles Darwin to make his case in Expelled, also noting that scenes shot at Pepperdine University, in which Stein gives a speech to an auditorium full of students, in fact used a large number of extras, hired to respond favorably to Stein's speech, to fill the room. The media response to the film has been largely unfavorable. It received an 11% meta-score from Rotten Tomatoes. Multiple reviews, including those of USA Today and Scientific American, have described the film as propaganda.

In a Trinity Broadcasting Network interview with Paul Crouch Jr. regarding the movie, Stein claimed that "[religion] leads you to a very glorious place, and science leads you to killing people".

The Anti-Defamation League issued a statement condemning the film's misuse of The Holocaust and its imagery, "Using the Holocaust in order to tarnish those who promote the theory of evolution is outrageous and trivializes the complex factors that led to the mass extermination of European Jewry".

At the University of Vermont, Stein was invited to receive an honorary degree and be the commencement speaker for the graduating class of 2009. University President Dan Fogel received complaints about Stein's planned appearance, due to Stein's views on evolution. Stein declined his commencement invitation.

At the private, Christian Liberty University 2009 graduation, Stein was awarded an honorary degree and, according to the university, "spoke extensively about his work on Expelled: No Intelligence Allowed".

=== Foreign policy ===
Stein is a staunch supporter of Israel. On Larry King Live in 2009, in a heated exchange with then-Congressman Ron Paul, he referred to Paul as antisemitic for referring to the U.S. as "occupiers" in the Arabian peninsula.

=== Political endorsements ===
Stein endorsed John McCain for president in 2008, calling him "an impressive guy". That year, he also stated that he would vote for Ralph Nader. In January 2012, Stein appeared in political advertisements sponsored by Associated Industries of Florida supporting legislation that would create three resort casinos in South Florida. He claimed in late 2014 that President Barack Obama was the most racist president in American history, saying Obama "made everything about race".

In 2016, Stein reprised the famous attendance scene from Ferris Bueller in a campaign ad for Iowa Senator Chuck Grassley. In it, Stein intoned the last name of Grassley's opponent (Patty Judge) to silence, while facts about her missed votes and absences from state board meetings were listed. Stein then calls out "Grassley," which gets a response; Stein mutters, "He's always here."

Stein initially supported Donald Trump in the 2016 United States presidential election, but retracted his support in October 2016, writing, "But it's time for Donald Trump to go back to Trump Tower. Time for Mike Pence to move to the top of the ticket." However, Stein went on to vote for Trump.

== Bibliography ==
Stein's book titles to date (7 fiction, 21 nonfiction) include:

Year	Title	Publisher	ISBN
1978
1978	On the Brink: A Novel (coauthor: Herbert Stein)	Ballantine Books	0-345-27650-7
1978	Dreemz (hardcover: California Dreemz)	Ballantine Books	0-345-28156-X
1979	The View from Sunset Boulevard: America as Brought to You By the People Who Make Television	Basic Books	0-465-09032-X
1981	Moneypower: How to Make Inflation Make You Rich (coauthor: Herbert Stein)	Avon	0-380-54809-7
1982	'Ludes	St. Martin's Press	0-312-50012-2
1986	Her Only Sin	St. Martin's Press	0-312-90636-6
1988	Hollywood Days, Hollywood Nights: The Diary of a Mad Screenwriter	Bantam Books	0-553-34520-6
1992	A License to Steal: the Untold Story of Michael Milken and the Conspiracy to Bilk the Nation	Simon & Schuster	0-671-74272-8
1998	Tommy & Me: The Making of a Dad	Free Press	0-68483-896-6
2002	How to Ruin Your Life	Hay House	1-56170-974-3
2003	How to Ruin Your Love Life	Hay House	1-4019-0240-5
2004	How to Ruin Your Financial Life	Hay House	1-4019-0241-3
2004	Can America Survive? The Rage of the Left, the Truth, and What to Do About It	New Beginnings Press	1-4019-0333-9
2005	Yes, You Can Be a Successful Income Investor: Reaching for Yield in Today's Market	New Beginnings Press	1-4019-0319-3
2005	Yes, You Can Still Retire Comfortably: The Baby-Boom Retirement Crisis and how to Beat It	New Beginnings Press	1-4019-0318-5
2006	How Successful People Win: Using "Bunkhouse Logic" to Get What You Want in Life	Hay House	1-56170-975-1
2007	The Real Stars: In Today's America, Who Are the True Heroes?	New Beginnings Press	1-40191-144-7
2008	How to Ruin the United States of America	New Beginnings Press	1-40191-869-7
2012	How to Really Ruin Your Financial Life and Portfolio	Wiley	1-11833-873-1

== Filmography and television appearances ==
Year	Title	Credit			Notes
Year	Title	Actor	Screenwriter	Role	Notes
1976	All's Fair	No	No		Consultant
1977	Fernwood 2 Night	No	No		Creative consultant
1984	The Wild Life	Yes	No	Surplus salesman	
1986	Ferris Bueller's Day Off	Yes	No	Economics teacher	
1987	Planes, Trains and Automobiles	Yes	No	Wichita airport representative	
1987–1990	Charles in Charge	Yes	No	Stanley Willard	4 episodes
1988	Frankenstein General Hospital	Yes	No	Dr. Who	
1988	The Boost	No	Yes		
1989	Ghostbusters II	Yes	No	Public Works official	
1989	Easy Wheels	Yes	No	Preacher	
1989–1991	The Wonder Years	Yes	No	Mr. Cantwell	12 episodes
1991	Soapdish	Yes	No	Nitwit executive	
1991	MacGyver	Yes	No	Major Snead	Episode: "Honest Abe"
1992	Honeymoon in Vegas	Yes	No	Walter	
1992	Mastergate	Yes	No	Marvin Rotweiler	
1993	Melrose Place	Yes	No	loan officer	Episode: "My New Partner"
1993	Dave	Yes	No	Himself	
1993	Dennis the Menace	Yes	No	Boss	
1993	Me and the Kid	Yes	No	Fred Herbert	
1993	Full House	Yes	No	Elliott Warner	Episode: "Another Opening, Another No Show"
1993	Animaniacs	Yes	No	Francis "Pip" Pumphandle	Voice, episode: "Chairman of the Bored"
1993	The Day My Parents Ran Away	Yes	No	Dr. Lillianfarb	
1993–1994	Hearts Afire	Yes	No	Mr. Starnes	2 episodes
1994	My Girl 2	Yes	No	Stanley Rosenfeld	
1994	Love & War	Yes	No	Dr. Baxter	Episode: "Are the Stars Out Tonight?"
1994	Mr. Write	Yes	No	Eliott	Uncredited
1994	North	Yes	No	Curator	
1994	The Mask	Yes	No	Dr. Arthur Neuman	
1994	Richie Rich	Yes	No	School teacher	
1995	Tales from the Crypt	Yes	No	Andrews	Episode: "Doctor of Horror"
1995	Miami Rhapsody	Yes	No	Rabbi	
1995	Lois & Clark: The New Adventures of Superman	Yes	No	Pro lawyer	Episode: "Whine, Whine, Whine"
1995	Casper	Yes	No	Mr. Rugg	
1995	Married... with Children	Yes	No	Thomas	Episode: "Requiem for a Dead Briard"
1995	Freakazoid!	Yes	No	H.A. Futterman	Voice, episode: "Relax-O-Vision"
1995	Live Shot	Yes	No	Hal, Herb	2 episodes
1995	The Marshal	Yes	No	Ben	Episode: "Time Off for Clever Behavior"
1995–1996	The Mask: Animated Series	Yes	No	Dr. Arthur Neuman	Voice, 3 episodes
1996–1998	The Spooktacular New Adventures of Casper	Yes	No	Mr. Happ	Voice, 3 episodes
1996	Bruno the Kid	Yes	No	Professor Wisenstein	Voice
1996	Aaahh!!! Real Monsters	Yes	No	Glug, Computer	Voice, episode: "Less Talk, More Monsters"
1996	Earthworm Jim	Yes	No	Dr. Houston, Rosebud	Voice, 2 episodes
1996	House Arrest	Yes	No	Ralph Doyle, Attorney-At-Law	
1996	Toonstruck	Yes	No	Sam Schmaltz	Video game
1996–1997	Duckman	Yes	No	Dr. Ben Stein, Lionel Stein	Voice, 9 episodes
1997	Seinfeld	Yes	No	Shellbach	Episode: "The Comeback"
1997	Murphy Brown	Yes	No	Williams	Episode: "How to Marry a Billionaire"
1997	A Smile Like Yours	Yes	No	clinic video narrator	Voice
1997	101 Dalmatians: The Series	Yes	No	waiter	Voice, episode: "Two Faces of Anita"
1997	Casper: A Spirited Beginning	Yes	No	Grocer	
1997	Total Security	Yes	No	Sam Hinkle	Episode: "Citizen Canine"
1997	Rugrats	Yes	No	Bingo Caller	Voice, episode: "Lady Luck"
1997–2003	Win Ben Stein's Money	No	No	Himself	Host
1998	Muppets Tonight	Yes	No	The Sad And Lonely Man That Science Has Left Dr. Honeydew	Episode: "Andie MacDowell"
1998	Breakfast with Einstein	Yes	No	Jack	
1998	Men in White	Yes	No	Man in Strangemeister's head	
1998	Casper Meets Wendy	Yes	No	Lawyer	Uncredited
1998	Hercules	Yes	No	Trivia	Voice, episode: "Hercules and the Pool Party"
1998	The Secret Files of the Spy Dogs	Yes	No	Ernst Stavro Blowfish	Episode: "I.H.R.F./Oatz"
1998	Pinky and the Brain	Yes	No	Francis "Pip" Pumphandle	Voice, episode: "Star Warners"
1998	The Hughleys	Yes	No	Dr. Mopp	Episode: "I'm Shrinnnking"
1998	Tannenbaum	Yes	No	Car lot owner	
1999	Pinky, Elmyra & the Brain	Yes	No	Rockin' Johnny Hot	Voice, episode: "At the Hop!"
1999	Wakko's Wish	Yes	No	Desire Fulfillment Facilitator	Voice
1999	Shasta McNasty	Yes	No	himself	Episode: "Adult Education"
1999	Turn Ben Stein On	No	No	Himself	Host, executive producer, theme music composer
2000	The Man Show	Yes	No	Juggy University professor	Episode: "X-Ray Specs"
2001	The Drew Carey Show	Yes	No	Heavenly Guide	Episode: "Drew's in a Coma"
2001	Lloyd in Space	Yes	No	Ranger Wormy	Episode: "Caution: Wormhole!"
2001	Osmosis Jones	Yes	No	Doc	Uncredited
2002	The Adventures of Jimmy Neutron, Boy Genius	Yes	No	Giggles the clown	Voice, episode: "Hypno Birthday to You"
2002	Santa vs. the Snowman 3D	Yes	No	Spunky the Elf	Voice
2002	Most Outrageous Game Show Moments	No	No	Himself	Co-host
2002	Do Over	Yes	No	Teacher	Episode: "Joel Larsen's Day Off"
2003–2009	Family Guy	Yes	No	Rabbi Goldberg	Voice, 2 episodes
2004	King of the Hill	Yes	No	Quizmaster	Voice, episode: "Stressed for Success"
2004–2008	The Fairly OddParents	Yes	No	Head Pixie, Sanderson, Pixies	Voice, 8 episodes
2004	As Told by Ginger	Yes	No	Buddy Baker	Voice, 3 episodes
2005	Son of the Mask	Yes	No	Dr. Neuman	
2005	Game Show Moments Gone Bananas	No	No	Himself (Presenter)	
2006	Mayor Dog	Yes	No	Narrator	
2006	Totally Awesome	Yes	No	Narrator	
2006	The Emperor's New School	Yes	No	Mr. Purutu	Voice, 8 episodes
2007	America's Most Smartest Model	No	No	Himself (Host)	
2007	Your Mommy Kills Animals	No	No	Himself	
2008	Expelled: No Intelligence Allowed	No	Yes	Himself	Documentary
2012–2018	Cavuto on Business	No	No	Himself	Panelist
2016	Facetiming With Mommy	Yes	No	Daddy	TV series
2018	The Last Sharknado: It's About Time	Yes	No	Alexander Hamilton	
2019	Animal Sanctuary	Yes	No	Donald Donkey	Voice; Short
TBA	The Engagement Ring	Yes	No	Dr. Miller	Announced

Awards and achievements
Preceded by Pat Sajak	Daytime Emmy Award for Outstanding Game Show Host; 1999 with Jimmy Kimmel	Succeeded by Bob Barker and Tom Bergeron
