= International Society for Complexity, Information, and Design =

Creationism advocacy organization

- Abbreviation: ISCID
- Formation: 6 December 2001
- Executive director: William A. Dembski
- Website: ISCID.ORG

The International Society for Complexity, Information, and Design (ISCID) was a creationism advocacy organization that described itself as "a cross-disciplinary professional society that investigates complex systems apart from external programmatic constraints like materialism, naturalism, or reductionism." It was founded and led by figures associated with the intelligent design movement, such as William A. Dembski and Michael Behe.

== Overview ==
The society was launched on 6 December 2001. It was co-founded by William A. Dembski, Micah Sparacio and John Bracht. Dembski served as its executive director. It had about sixty fellows, many of them figures associated with the intelligent design movement and fellows of the Discovery Institute's Center for Science and Culture, including Dembski, Behe, Jonathan Wells, William Lane Craig, and Henry F. Schaefer. Other notable ISCID fellows include philosopher of religion Alvin Plantinga and physics professor and theologian Frank J. Tipler.

ISCID hosted its first online symposium in October 2002, titled "The Teleological Origin of Biological Information."

ISCID described itself as providing "a forum for formulating, testing, and disseminating research on complex systems through critique, peer review, and publication," with an aim "to pursue the theoretical development, empirical application, and philosophical implications of information- and design-theoretic concepts for complex systems."

ISCID maintained an online journal titled Progress in Complexity, Information and Design (PCID). Articles were submitted through its website and could appear in the journal if they had been approved by one of the fellows. Dembski and Tipler believed that this review process was preferable to the process of scholarly peer review commonly used in mainstream journals, citing that peer review "too often degenerates into a vehicle for censoring novel ideas that break with existing frameworks."

ISCID also hosted an online forum called Brainstorms and maintains a copyrighted online user-written Internet encyclopedia called the ISCID Encyclopedia of Science and Philosophy. The society featured online chats with intelligent-design proponents and others sympathetic to the movement or interested in aspects of complex systems. Past chats included people such as Ray Kurzweil, David Chalmers, Stuart Kauffman, Christopher Michael Langan and Robert Wright.

In May 2011 the society's website stated that "ISCID is no longer being managed as an organization". The last issue of PCID was published in November 2005, its essay contests had been discontinued, and the last moderated chat was in 2004. By 2014, its website was no longer online.

== PCID peer review controversy ==
ISCID's journal, Progress in Complexity, Information, and Design has been cited as an example of a journal set up by intelligent design proponents to publish articles promoting intelligent design without a peer review process with sufficient impartiality and rigor. ISCID fellows who comprised PCID's reviewers were characterized as "ardent supporters of intelligent design."

ISCID's peer review policy for PCID was based on ISCID Fellow Frank Tipler's article covering what he saw as problems with traditional peer review processes. ISCID required that for articles to be accepted into the archive, they "need to meet basic scholarly standards and be relevant to the study of complex systems." Once in the archive, articles only needed to be approved by a single ISCID Fellow in order to be published. ISCID says that this policy is designed to provide peer review for quality without squelching paradigm changing theories. However, the American Association for the Advancement of Science contended that review processes such as PCID's were different from the accepted standard of peer review, where "reviewers are experts in the relevant scientific fields who have no conflict of interest with or especially close personal relationships to the authors or requestors."

== Fellows ==
In addition to guiding the society's various programs, fellows served as the editorial advisory board that peer-reviewed the society's journal, PCID.

Partial list of ISCID Fellows:

- Michael Behe
- John Angus Campbell
- Robin Collins
- William Lane Craig
- Bernard d'Abrera
- William A. Dembski
- Guillermo Gonzalez
- Bruce L. Gordon
- Muzaffar Iqbal
- Christopher Michael Langan
- Forrest Mims
- Scott Minnich
- Paul Nelson
- Alvin Plantinga
- Henry F. Schaefer, III
- Jeffrey M. Schwartz
- Richard Sternberg
- Frank J. Tipler
- Jonathan Wells
