= Alleghanian orogeny =

Mountain-forming event that formed the Appalachian and Allegheny Mountains

Location of the Hercynian/Variscan/Alleghanian mountain chains in the Carboniferous period. Large labels are continents that joined during these orogenies. Present day coastlines in gray. Sutures are red.

The Alleghanian orogeny or Appalachian orogeny is one of the geological mountain-forming events that formed the Appalachian Mountains and Allegheny Mountains. The term and spelling Alleghany orogeny was originally proposed by H.P. Woodward in 1957.

The Alleghanian orogeny occurred approximately 325 million to 260 million years ago over at least five deformation events in the Carboniferous to Permian period. The orogeny was caused by Africa's collision with North America. At the time, these continents did not exist in their current forms: North America was part of the Euramerica super-continent, while Africa was part of Gondwana. This collision formed the super-continent Pangaea, which contained all major continental land masses. The collision provoked the orogeny: it exerted massive stress on what is today the Eastern Seaboard of North America, forming a wide and high mountain chain. Evidence for the Alleghanian orogeny stretches for many hundreds of kilometres on the surface from Alabama to New Jersey and can be traced further subsurface to the southwest. In the north, the Alleghanian deformation extends northeast to Newfoundland. Subsequent erosion wore down the mountain chain and spread sediments both to the east and to the west.

== Continental collision ==
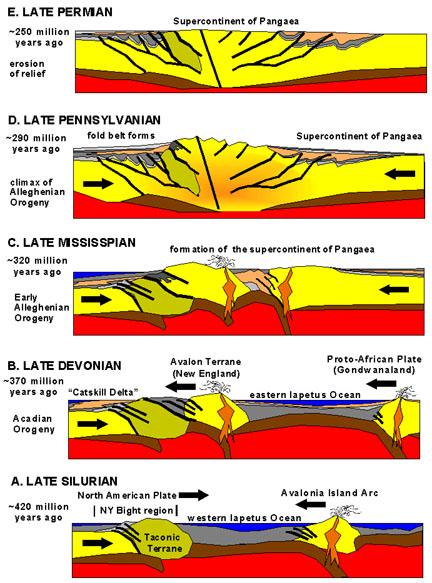
The Alleghanian orogeny, a result of three separate continental collisions. USGS

The immense region involved in the continental collision, the vast temporal length of the orogeny, and the thickness of the pile of sediments and igneous rocks known to have been involved are evidence that at the peak of the mountain-building process, the Appalachians likely once reached elevations similar to those of the Alps and the Rocky Mountains before they were eroded.

As the continents collided, the rock material trapped in-between was crushed and forced upward. With nowhere to go, rocks along the eastern margin of the North American continent were shoved far inland (the same occurred in the opposite direction along the margin of the African continent, forming the Atlas Mountains of Morocco and the western Sahara). Close to the boundary between the colliding plates, tectonic stresses contributed to the metamorphism of the rock (i.e. the transformation of igneous and sedimentary rock into metamorphic rock).

The sedimentary rock in the eastern Appalachian Basin region was squeezed into great folds that ran perpendicular to the direction of forces. The greatest amount of deformation associated with the Alleghanian orogeny occurred in the Southern Appalachians (North Carolina, Tennessee, Virginia, and West Virginia). In that region, a series of great faults developed in addition to the folds. As the two continents collided, large belts of rock bounded by thrust faults piled one on top of another, shortening the crust along the eastern edge of North America in the North Carolina and Tennessee region by as much as 300 kilometres (200 mi). The relative amount of deformation gradually diminishes northward. The fold belt extends northward through Pennsylvania and gradually fades in the vicinity of the New York border. The Kittatinny Mountains in northwestern New Jersey mark the northeasternmost extension of the high ridges of the Valley and Ridge Province. The influence of Alleghanian deformation on the regions east of the Valley and Ridge Province must have been even more intense; however, there is little evidence preserved. Rocks of Mississippian, Pennsylvanian, and Permian age are missing along the Eastern Seaboard.

== Subsequent erosion ==
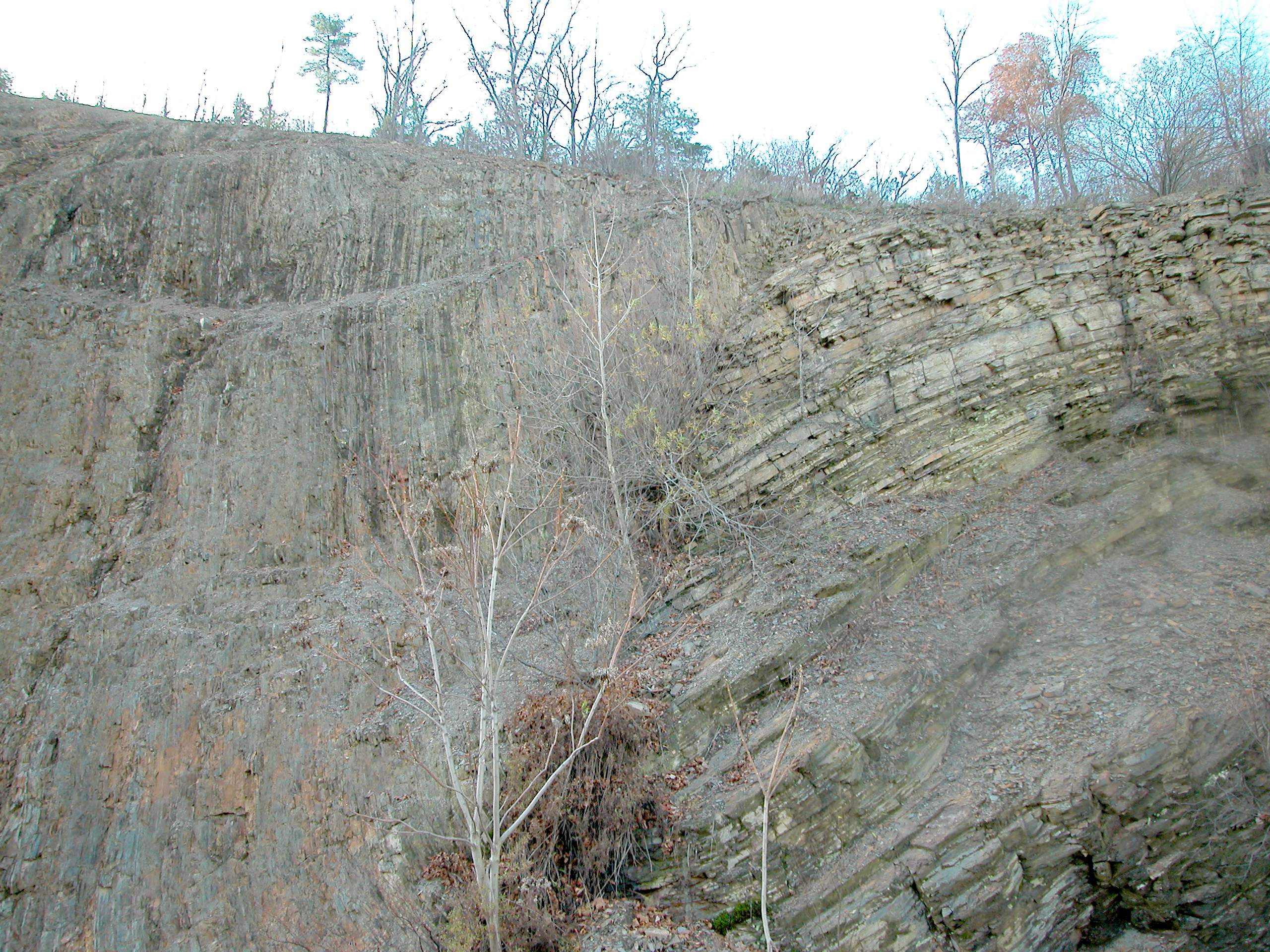
Major fault at the dividing line between the Allegheny Plateau and the true Appalachian Mountains (Williamsport, Pennsylvania).

The mountains formed by the Alleghanian orogeny were once rugged and high during the Mesozoic and late Paleozoic but in our time are eroded into only a small remnant: the heavily eroded hills of the Piedmont. Sediments that were carried eastward formed the coastal plain and part of the continental shelf. Thus, the coastal plain and Piedmont are largely the byproducts of erosion that took place from 150+ million years ago to the present. Sediments that were carried westward formed the Allegheny and Cumberland plateaux. Although people living in those respective areas sometimes refer to them as mountains, they are more accurately uplifted and eroded plateaux.

A portion of the Alleghanian mountain system departed with Africa when Pangaea broke up and the Atlantic Ocean began to form. Today, this forms the Anti-Atlas mountains of Morocco. The Anti-Atlas have been geologically uplifted in relatively recent times and are today much more rugged than their Alleghanian relatives.

== See also ==
- Geology of the Appalachians
- Central Pangean Mountains
- Mauritanide Belt
- Inliers and outliers (geology)
