= Pangean megamonsoon =

Paleoclimatological hypothesis

The Pangean megamonsoon refers to the paleoclimatological hypothesis that the ancient supercontinent Pangaea had experienced a distinct seasonal reversal of winds (monsoons), which resulted in extreme transitions between dry and wet periods throughout the year. Pangaea was a conglomeration of all the global continental land masses, which lasted from the late Carboniferous to the mid-Jurassic. The megamonsoon intensified as the continents continued to shift toward one another and reached its maximum strength in the Triassic, when the continental surface area of Pangaea was at its peak.

The megamonsoon would have led to immensely arid regions with extremely hot days and frigid nights around the interior of the supercontinent, making those areas nearly uninhabitable to terrestrial ecosystems. The coastal regions experienced seasonality, however, and transitioned from rainy weather in the summer to dry conditions during the winter.

== Monsoon circulation ==
Monsoon circulations, defined as a seasonal reversal of winds, exhibit large shifts in precipitation patterns across the impacted region. Monsoons are therefore characterized by two primary seasons: rainy and dry. They are induced by the presence of at least one large land mass and large body of water in close proximity to each other. The most commonly studied present-day monsoon circulation is the East Asian Monsoon.

=== Discovery ===
The concept of a Pangean monsoon circulation was first proposed in 1973. The evaporites in the geologic record suggest vast and extensive regions of persistent dry conditions near the Pangean centre, serving as the initial evidence for the theory’s dissemination. The interior of the supercontinent, especially the eastern portion, would have been extremely dry as the hemispheric pressure systems driving the circulation would have diverted nearly all atmospheric moisture away from the region. The later indication of a monsoon-driven climate was acquired via the examination of coal deposits along the exterior portions of the continent. The presence of both features in the geologic record suggest monsoonal circulations.

As the theory of the Pangean megamonsoon began to increase in credibility, paleoclimatologists predicted the climatological impacts of the circulation to ascertain whether observations and models supported the hypothesis. The general consensus listed four primary signs that needed to be present to validate the existence of megamonsoon.

1. The lithologic indicators of seasonality should span broad distances along the Pangean coasts.
2. Evidence depicting a deviation from zonal flow regimes needed to be identified.
3. Records should indicate that the equatorial regions of Pangea would have been plagued by persistent aridity.
4. Models and geologic observations would need to demonstrate that this circulation peaked during the Triassic.

=== Monsoon climate on Pangea ===
In the Northern Hemisphere's summer, when Earth’s axial tilt was directed toward the sun, Laurasia would have received the most direct solar insolation, which would have yielded a broad area of warm, rising air and low surface pressure over the continent. Models have suggested that this seasonal low was positioned at 35° latitude, relatively near the Tethys Ocean. In Gondwana, high pressure would have dominated, as the land would have been receiving less solar radiation and therefore experiencing cooler temperatures.

The pressure-gradient force dictates that air will travel from regions of high to low pressure. That would have driven the atmospheric flow from the Southern Hemisphere toward Laurasia during which it would cross the Tethys Ocean. Water from the Tethys would evaporate into the air mass. Eventually, the air mass would reach the coast of Laurasia and resulted in immense amounts of precipitation. Models estimate the globally-averaged precipitation to equal roughly 1,000 mm per year, with coastal regions receiving upwards of 8 mm of rain each day during the rainy season. As the atmospheric flow was directed away from the Gondwana high pressure system, surface winds would have diverged, producing clear and very dry conditions across the Southern Hemisphere.

Several studies have indicated that the circulation was so intense during the Triassic, it would have been capable of reversing part of the predominantly-easterly global wind flow and so westerly winds impacted the western coast. That worked to maximize surface convergence and increased seasonality along the western coasts of each continent.

During the Northern Hemisphere winter, when Earth’s tilt was directed away from the Sun, the circulation reversed as the area of maximum solar insolation shifted toward the Southern Hemisphere. Air then traveled from Laurasia (region of high pressure), across the Tethys Ocean to Gondwana (region of low pressure). Moisture advection toward the Southern Hemisphere would have fueled heavy precipitation along the Gondwana coasts, while Laurasia remained very dry.

== Comparison to present day ==
There are marked similarities between factors contributing to the East Asian monsoon and those that would have influenced Pangean climate. That supports the theory that Pangean climate was dominated by the monsoon and aids in its study by providing paleoclimatologists with a present-day example to which they can compare their findings. The width of the Tethys Ocean is believed to have been roughly the same as that of the Indian Ocean. It is well documented that the Indian Ocean can provide onshore-moving air masses with enough moisture to support a monsoon-driven environment. Thus, the Tethys should have been able to as well.

Many paleoclimate models have attempted to recreate climate patterns on Pangea. The models have yielded results that are comparable with the East Asian Monsoon. For instance, one model reported that the seasonal pressure differential (wintertime high pressure – summertime low pressure) over the continent was 25 millibars, while the Asian pressure varies by 36 millibars on average throughout the year.

The Central Pangean Mountains potentially played a similar role in the megamonsoon as the Tibetan Plateau in the East Asian Monsoon. Model simulations suggest that without the presence of the mountain range, the monsoon circulation would have been substantially weakened. Higher elevations may have intensified the atmospheric circulation by maximizing the surface heating and subsequently the latent heat release during the summer rainy season. There is still significant uncertainty regarding the extent of the impact that range would have had, however, because mountain elevations are unknown.

== Geologic record ==
=== Coal and evaporites ===
Coal is typically an indicator of moist climates since it needs both plant matter and humid conditions to form. The poleward progression of coal deposits with time suggests that the regions of maximum rainfall shifted away from the equator. Nonetheless, the employment of coal as a climatic indicator of precipitation is still employed with caution by geologists, as its creation secondarily depends on rainfall amounts. When a significant amount of evaporation occurs, evaporites are formed, which therefore signifies arid conditions.

=== Loess ===
Loess, or windblown dust, can be used as an indicator of past atmospheric circulation patterns. Without the presence of the monsoon, surface winds across the globe would have been primarily zonal and easterly. The geologic record, however, indicates that winds exhibited a meridional cross-equatorial pattern but also that western Pangea experienced westerly flow during the peak period of the megamonsoon.

=== Paleontological evidence ===
Fossils dating back to the Pangean era also support the claim that a strongly-monsoonal circulation dominated the supercontinent’s climate. For example, tree rings (also called growth rings) provide convincing proof of distinct changes in annual weather patterns. Trees rooted in areas that do not experience seasonality will not exhibit rings within their trunks as they grow. Fossilized wood excavated from what was once coastal, mid-latitude Pangea, however, display the clear presence of rings. Other paleoflora suggest that a significant portion of the year would have been dominated by a warm, moist season. Large, smooth leaf shapes with thin cuticles and symmetric distribution of stomata, as well as tropical fern species have been uncovered from those regions.

The invertebrates and vertebrates that existed on Pangea offer further evidence of seasonality. For instance, unionid bivalve shells exhibit uniform banding patterns. Unionid bivalves were aquatic organisms that required shallow, oxygen-rich lakes to thrive. During the summer, when rain was persistent, their respiration occurred aerobically and precipitated calcium carbonate to grow their shells. In the winter, when precipitation ceased, the shallow aquatic environments within the Pangean continent began to dry up. Thus, unionid bivalves depleted their environments of oxygen and eventually had to resort to anaerobic processes for respiration. The anaerobic respiration yielded acidic waste, which reacted with the calcium carbonate shell, creating a darker ring and marking the presence of a distinct dry season. Once the summer rains returned, aerobic respiration was restored and calcium carbonate was once again produced. The transition from dry winters to rainy summers is therefore recorded in these alternating patterns of light and dark bands on the unionid bivalve shells.

Lungfish burrowing patterns also correlate well with the rise and the fall of the water levels. The height of the water would have increased during the rainy season, but then decreased rapidly as the winds shifted and diverted moisture away from the location, thus initiating the dry season. Additional evidence of seasonality can be observed in the fossilized carcasses of other vertebrate organisms. These show signs of substantial drying, which would have occurred during the winter, before they were buried and preserved by mudflow (resulting from a persistent rainy period).

== Evolution ==
=== Carboniferous ===
During much of the Carboniferous, the tropics would have experienced humid conditions, and the high latitudes of Gondwana were covered by glaciers. Still, the first signs of the poleward movement of moisture arose during the late Carboniferous. Geologists have tracked regions of past coal accumulation as they began to be deposited further from the equator with time, evidence of a shift in precipitation patterns from the tropics toward the higher latitudes. Still, land mass distribution remained more heavily concentrated in the Southern Hemisphere. Atmospheric flow, therefore, remained largely zonal, indicating that the monsoon circulation had not yet begun to dominate the climatic pattern.

=== Permian ===
By the Permian, the monsoon circulation is apparent in the lithology. Winds with a westerly component (indicative of the summer monsoon, or wet season) are observed for the Early Permian. The continents continued to drift northward. As they did so, the land mass became more evenly distributed across the equator and the megamonsoon continued to intensify.

Gondwana’s progression northward also influenced its gradual deglaciation. Climate models indicate that low pressure systems strengthened as planetary ice cover decreased, thus exaggerating the effect of the monsoon. This also acted to magnify the aridity of the tropics. It is therefore suggested that glacial-interglacial patterns had a significant effect on the Pangean monsoonal circulation. Models have also indicated that worldwide carbon dioxide substantially increased between the Carboniferous and Permian, and resulted in increased temperatures.

=== Triassic ===
During the Triassic, the megamonsoon reached its maximum intensity, which is believed to be a result of the supercontinent attaining its largest surface area during this period from the final addition of Siberia and the North and South China cratons. Land mass was also equally distributed between the Northern and Southern Hemispheres, was nearly perfectly bisected by the equator, and extended from 85°N to 90°S.

Both the increase in Pangean surface area and the equitable dissemination of the land mass across the hemispheres maximized surface heating during the summer. The stronger the surface heating was, the more extreme the convection. By intensifying rising motion, the central pressure of the summertime surface low would have dropped. That, in turn, increased the hemispheric pressure gradient and amplified the cross-equatorial flow.

Additionally, the planet was experiencing a greenhouse climate during the Triassic, which resulted in continents completely devoid of ice, including the polar regions. Interglacial periods correlate well with an intensification of the monsoon circulation. Records clearly indicate a western component to the wind direction throughout this time period. It is also from that period that the paleontological evidence is most prevalent.

=== Jurassic ===
During the early Jurassic, the supercontinent continued to shift northward. The coasts along the Tethys Ocean grew more persistently humid. The monsoon circulation began to weaken through the Jurassic, when the continents started to drift apart. Records indicate that large-scale atmospheric flow progressively returned to a primarily zonal pattern. Climatic patterns therefore became less extreme across the continents.

== Model simulations ==
Today, the presence of the Pangean megamonsoon is generally accepted by the paleoclimate community. There is a substantial amount of evidence, both in the geologic record and model simulations, to support its existence. Nevertheless, a significant amount of uncertainty still remains, particularly from a modeling perspective. One of the greater unknowns paleoclimatologists face is the impact of the Central Pangean Mountains. Model simulations have suggested that without the presence of the mountain range, the monsoon circulation would have been substantially weakened.

Mountains were located to the north of the Tethys Ocean and resulted from the northward progression and subsequent subduction of the paleo-Tethyan plate. However, the height of these mountains has yet to be quantified. Scientists have acknowledged that approximating their elevation is of “capital importance”. Extremely high mountain ranges (rivaling the Himalayas) would have magnified atmospheric circulation, intensified the low pressure system, accelerated moisture transport to the coasts, and induced a rain shadow effect, promoting aridity on the leeward side of the range.

Studies also continue to examine the impact of orbital cycles on the monsoon circulation. The monsoon during the late Triassic appears to have been particularly impacted by Milankovich cycles for a period extending over at least 22 million years. Orbital eccentricity seems to have significantly affected precipitation cycles, but further research is required to better understand this correlation.

Climate modelers are trying to further understand and account for the surface and deep water circulations of the Panthalassic Ocean. The transport of heat resulting from these circulations significantly alters the simulated monsoon; therefore accurately representing them is of great importance. Continued research will eventually provide scientists with a much more complete comprehension of the progression and behavior of the megamonsoon that dominated the Pangean climate.
