= Central Pangean Mountains =

Major feature of the supercontinent

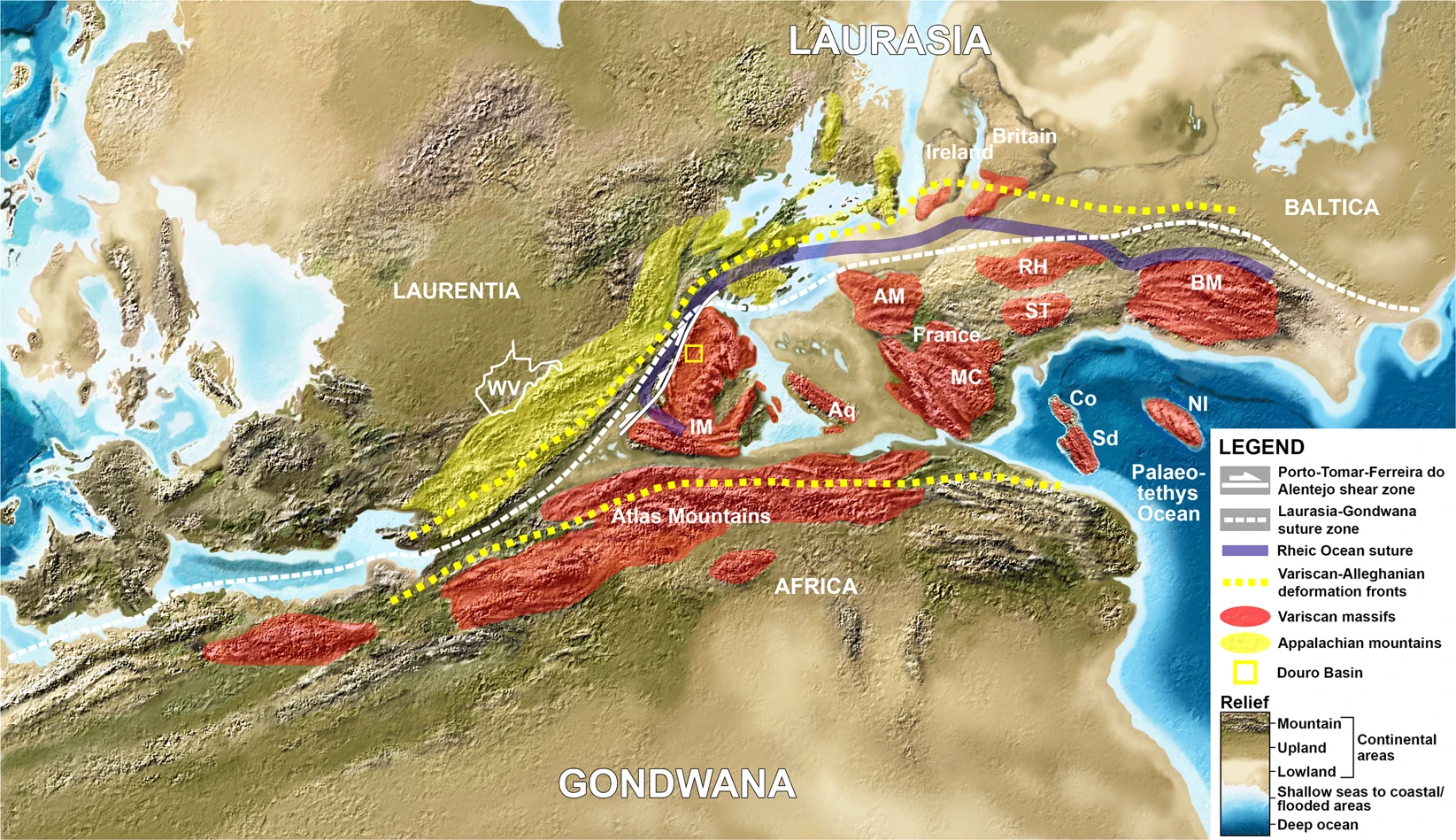
Map of mountains in central Pangaea during the Late Carboniferous-Early Permian, marking the Massif Central (MC), Bohemian Massif (BM), Corsica (Co), Sardinia (Sd), Iberian Massif (IM), West Virginia (WV), Aquitaine (Aq), Armorican Massif (AM), Northern Italy (NI), and the Rheno-Hercynian (RH) and Saxo-Thuringian (ST) terranes.

The Central Pangean Mountains were an extensive northeast–southwest trending mountain range in the central portion of the supercontinent Pangaea during the Carboniferous, Permian and Triassic periods. They were formed as a result of collision between the large landmasses of Euramerica (also known as Laurussia) and Gondwana during the formation of Pangaea. At its greatest elevation during the early part of the Permian period, it was comparable in size to the present Himalayas. Remnants of this massive mountain range include the Appalachian Mountains and Ouachita Mountains of North America, the Atlas Mountains and Anti-Atlas Mountains of Africa, as well as the Bohemian Massif and Massif Central in Europe.

A number of mountain building periods were involved in the formation of the Central Pangean Mountains, including the Acadian, Caledonian, Alleghenian, Mauritanide and Variscan orogenies.

The eastern portions of the range are also called the Variscan Mountains.

== Formation and decline ==
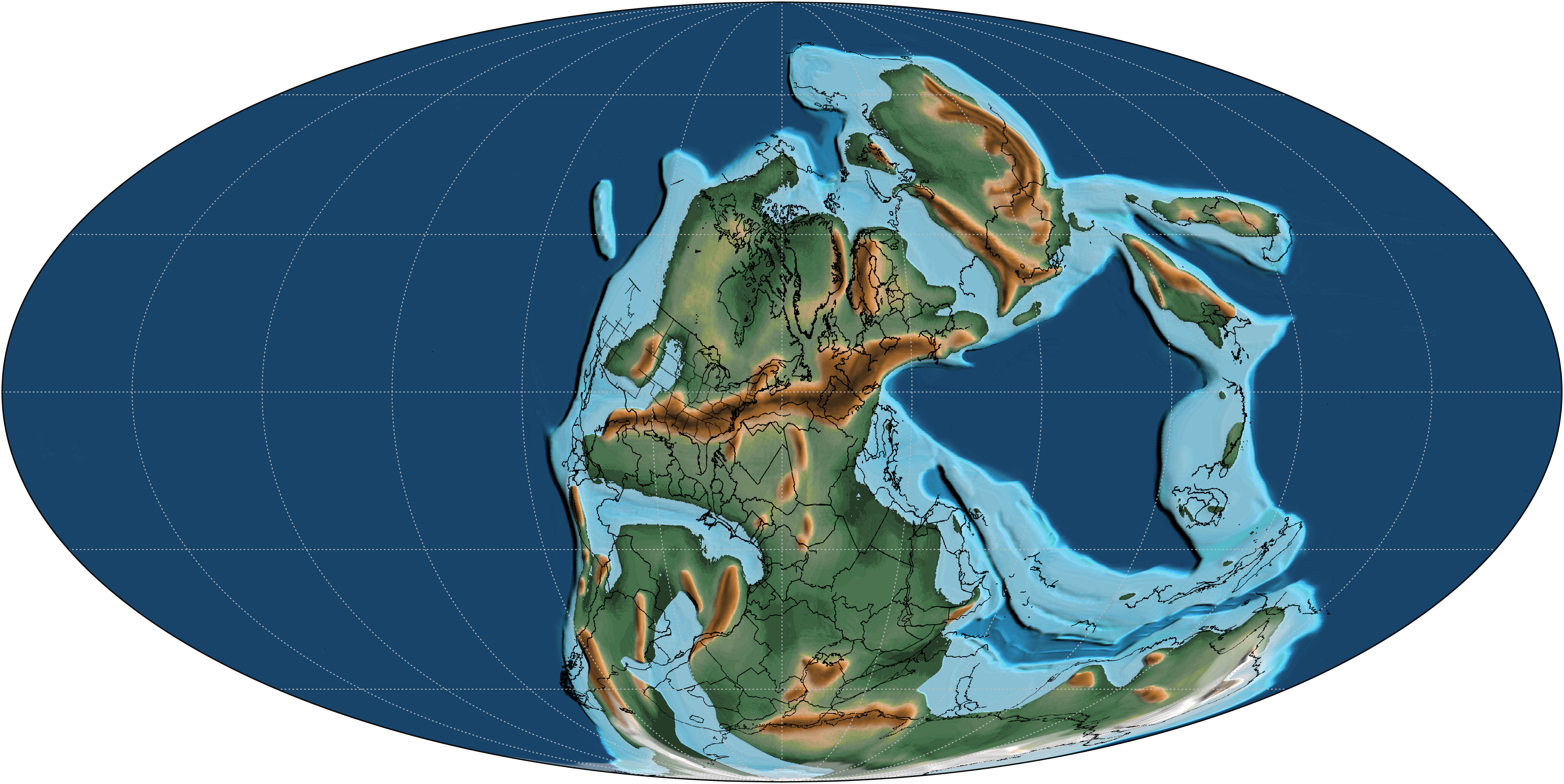
Map of Earth during the Early Permian, around 285 million years ago, showing Central Pangean mountain range at equator

The Central Pangean Mountains were formed during the collision of Euramerica and northern Gondwana as part of the Variscan and Alleghanian orogenies, which began during the Carboniferous approximately 340 million years ago, and complete by the beginning of the Permian around 295 million years ago, when the range was at its maximum elevation. During the Permian, the mountain range was subjected to intense physical and mechanical weathering, reducing the peaks to around half their original size by the Late Permian (Lopingian) and creating numerous deep intermontane valleys. By the Middle Triassic, the Central Pangean mountains had been substantially reduced in size, and by the earliest Jurassic around 200 million years ago the Pangean range in Western Europe had been reduced to a few upland areas surrounded by deep marine basins.

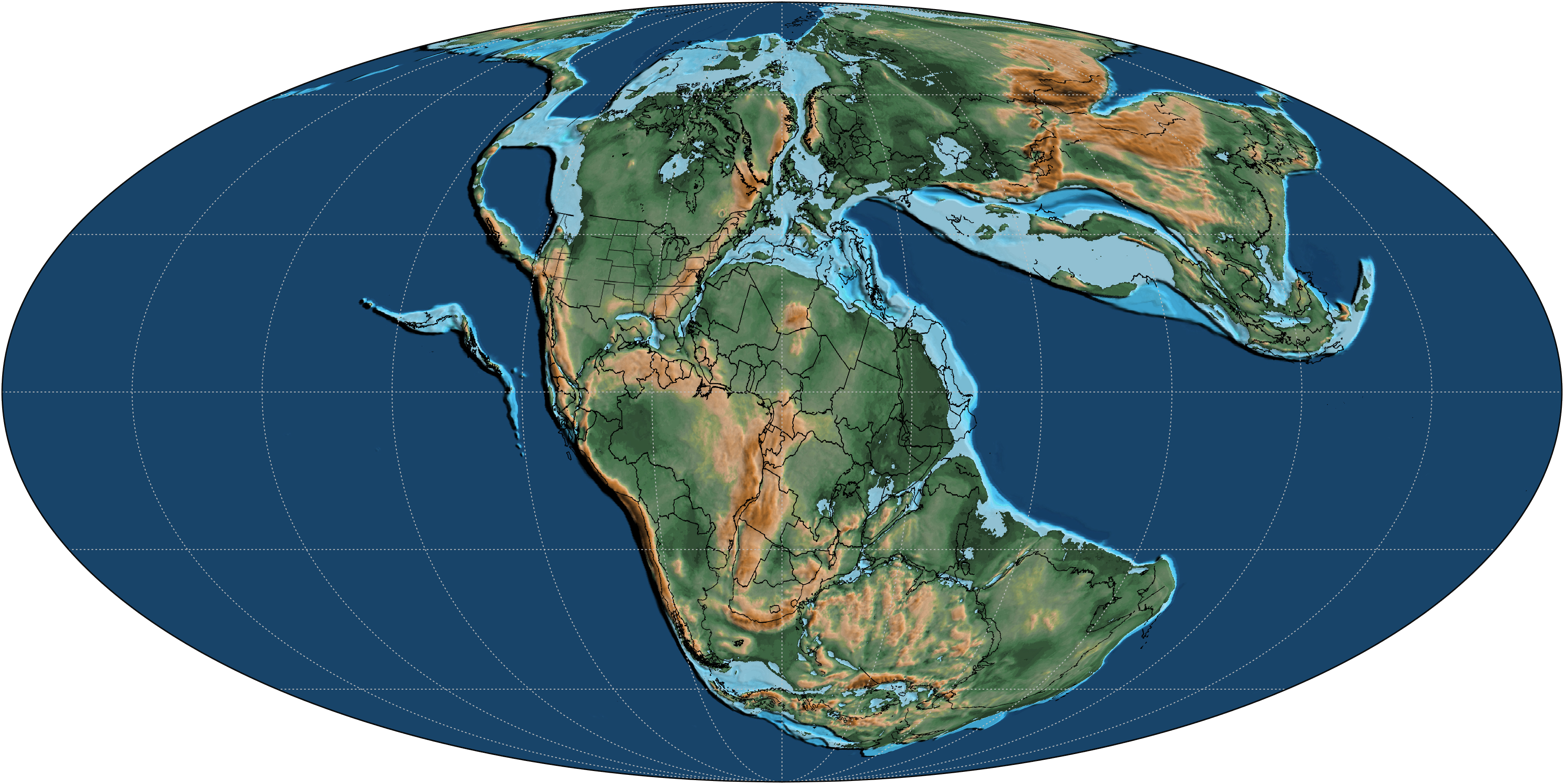
Map of Earth during the Early Jurassic, around 190 million years ago, demonstrating the decline and fragmentation of the Central Pangean Mountains

== Climate ==
Climate modeling suggests that the Central Pangean Mountains contributed to the deposition of vast quantities of coal in the late Carboniferous. The mountains created an area of year-round heavy precipitation, with no dry season typical of a monsoon climate. This is necessary for the preservation of peat in coal swamps. During the early-mid Permian, the Central Pangean Mountains lay directly beneath the equatorial rainy belt. Data from the loess deposits of the Salagou Formation in France, dating to the Permian, indicates that the upland areas of the Central Pangean Mountains may have been glaciated, despite being located at the equator. Due to their immense size and orientation nearly parallel to the equator, as Pangea drifted north during the Early Permian, the Central Pangean Mountains created a rain shadow to the north of the range, blocking the monsoonal rains from the Southern Hemisphere, resulting in the change of environment in the region from the coal swamp vegetation prevalent in the early Late Carboniferous to seasonally dry vegetation during the Early Permian, with the rain shadow contributing to the formation of the immense Zechstein salt deposits in Europe during the Late Permian.
