= Pangaea =

Supercontinent from the late Paleozoic to early Mesozoic eras

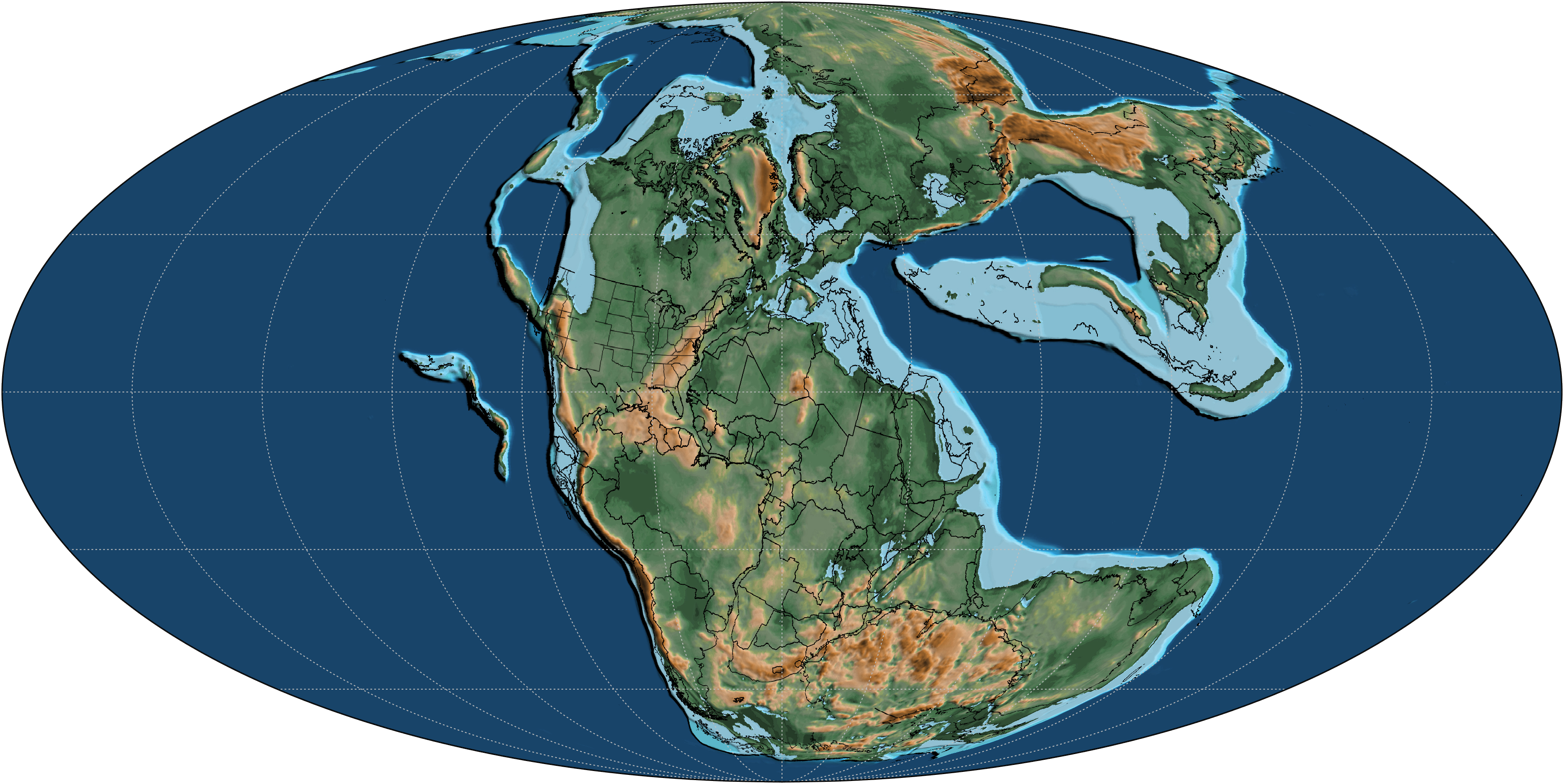
Paleomap of Pangaea 225 million years ago, during the Norian stage of the Triassic

Pangaea or Pangea (/pænˈdʒiːə/ pan-JEE-ə) was a supercontinent that existed during the late Paleozoic and early Mesozoic eras. It assembled from the earlier continental units of Gondwana, Euramerica and Siberia during the Carboniferous period approximately 335 million years ago, and began to break apart about 175 million years ago, at the beginning of the Jurassic. Pangaea was C-shaped, with the bulk of its mass stretching between Earth's northern and southern polar regions and surrounded by the superocean Panthalassa and the Paleo-Tethys and subsequent Tethys Oceans. Pangaea is the most recent supercontinent to have existed and was the first to be reconstructed by geologists.

== Origin of the concept ==
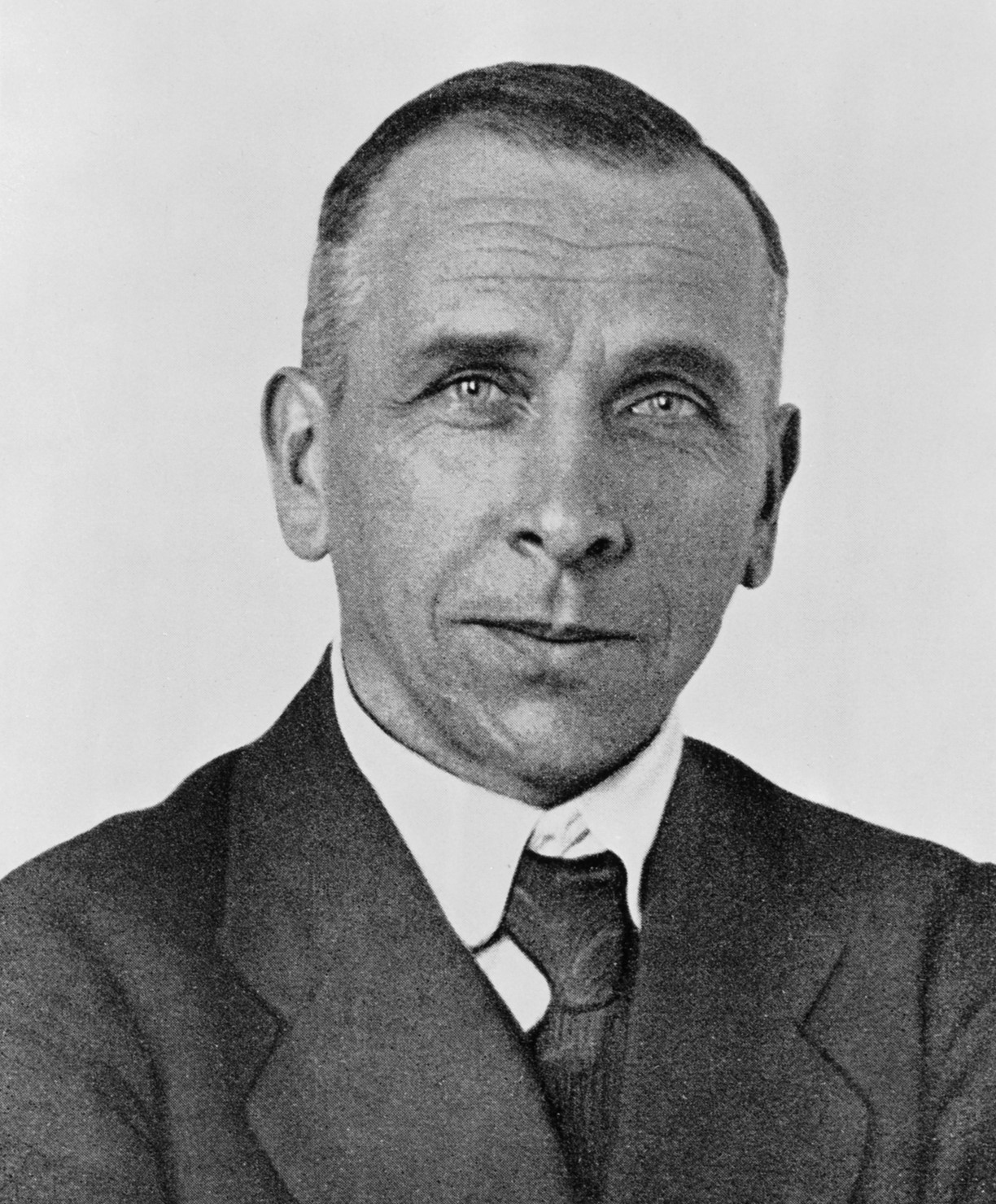
Alfred Wegener, c. 1924–1930

The name "Pangaea" is derived from Ancient Greek pan (πᾶν, "all, entire, whole") and Gaia or Gaea (Γαῖα, "Mother Earth, land"). (Note: As "Pangaea", it appears in Greek mythology as a mountain battle site during the Titanomachia. As "Pangaeus", it was the name of a specific mountain range in southern Thrace. "Pangaea" also appears in Vergil's Georgics and Lucan's Pharsalia The scholiast on Lucan glossed Pangaea id est totum terra—"Pangaea: that is, all land"—as having received its name on account of its smooth terrain and unexpected fertility.) The first to suggest that the continents were once joined and later separated may have been Abraham Ortelius in 1596. The concept that the continents once formed a contiguous land mass was hypothesised, with corroborating evidence, by Alfred Wegener, the originator of the scientific theory of continental drift, in three 1912 academic journal articles written in German titled Die Entstehung der Kontinente (The Origin of Continents). He expanded upon his hypothesis in his 1915 book of the same title, in which he postulated that, before breaking up and drifting to their present locations, all the continents had formed a single supercontinent that he called the Urkontinent.

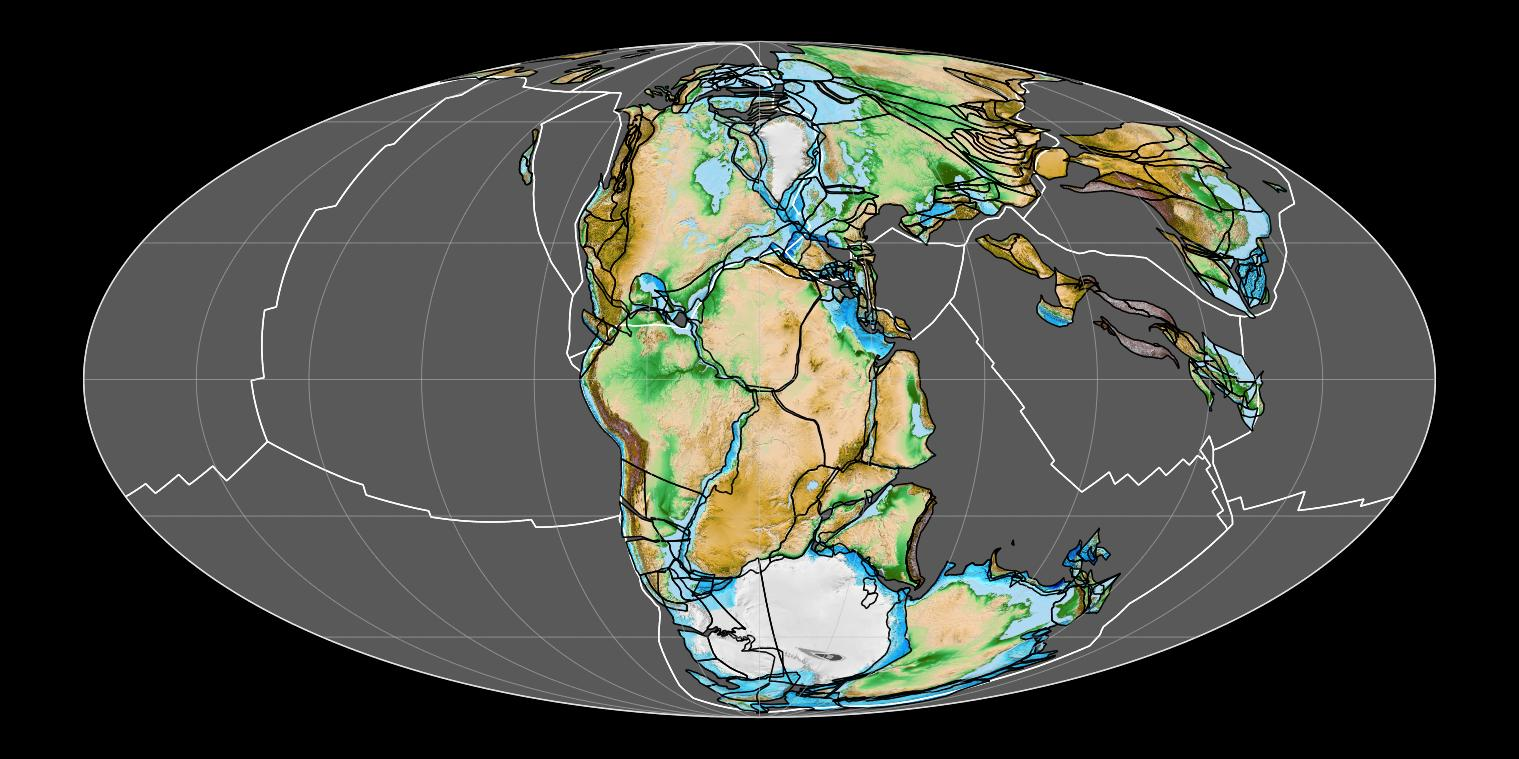
The supercontinent Pangaea in the early Mesozoic (at 200 Ma)

Wegener used the name "Pangaea" once in the 1920 edition of his book, referring to the ancient supercontinent as "the Pangaea of the Carboniferous". He used the Germanized form Pangäa, but the name entered German and English scientific literature (in 1922 and 1926, respectively) in the Latinized form Pangaea, especially during a symposium of the American Association of Petroleum Geologists in November 1926.

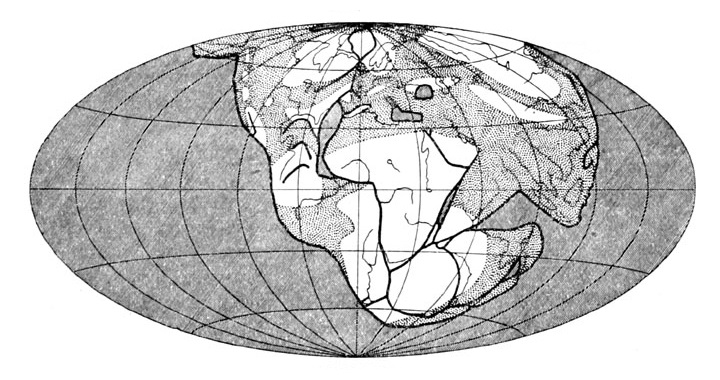
World map of Pangaea created by Alfred Wegener to illustrate his concept

Wegener originally proposed that the breakup of Pangaea was caused by centrifugal forces from Earth's rotation acting on the high continents. However, this mechanism was easily shown to be physically implausible, which delayed acceptance of the Pangaea hypothesis. Arthur Holmes proposed the more plausible mechanism of mantle convection, which, together with evidence provided by the mapping of the ocean floor following the Second World War, led to the development and acceptance of the theory of plate tectonics. This theory provides the widely accepted explanation for the existence and breakup of Pangaea.

== Evidence of existence ==
The distribution of fossils across the continents is one line of evidence pointing to the existence of Pangaea.

The geography of the continents bordering the Atlantic Ocean was the first evidence suggesting the existence of Pangaea. The seemingly close fit of the coastlines of North and South America with Europe and Africa was remarked on almost as soon as these coasts were charted. Careful reconstructions showed that the mismatch at the 500 fathoms (3,000 feet; 910 meters) contour was less than 130 km (81 mi), and it was argued that this was much too similar to be attributed to coincidence.

Additional evidence for Pangaea is found in the geology of adjacent continents, including matching geological trends between the eastern coast of South America, the east coast of North America (namely the Appalachian Mountains), and the western coast of Africa. The polar ice cap of the Carboniferous covered the southern end of Pangaea. Glacial deposits, specifically till, of the same age and structure are found on many separate continents that would have been together in the continent of Pangaea. The continuity of mountain chains provides further evidence, such as the Appalachian Mountains chain extending from the southeastern United States to the Scandinavian Caledonides of Europe; these are now believed to have formed a single chain, the Central Pangean Mountains.

Fossil evidence for Pangaea includes the presence of similar and identical species on continents that are now great distances apart. For example, fossils of the therapsid Lystrosaurus have been found in South Africa, India and Antarctica, alongside members of the Glossopteris flora, whose distribution would have ranged from the polar circle to the equator if the continents had been in their present position; similarly, the freshwater reptile Mesosaurus has been found only in localized regions of the coasts of Brazil and West Africa.

Geologists can also determine the movement of continental plates by examining the orientation of magnetic minerals in rocks. When rocks are formed, they take on the magnetic orientation of the Earth, showing which direction the poles lie relative to the rock; this determines latitudes and orientations (though not longitudes). Magnetic differences between samples of sedimentary and intrusive igneous rock whose age varies by millions of years is due to a combination of magnetic polar wander (with a cycle of a few thousand years) and the drifting of continents over millions of years. The polar wander component, which is identical for all contemporaneous samples, can be subtracted, leaving the portion that shows continental drift and can be used to help reconstruct earlier continental latitudes and orientations.

== Formation ==
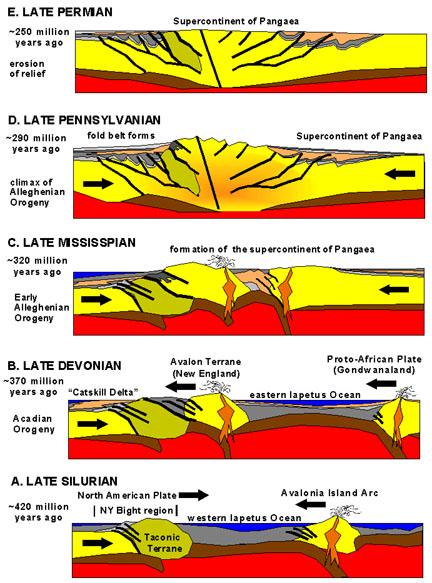
Appalachian orogeny

Pangaea is the most recent supercontinent reconstructed from the geologic record and, therefore, is by far the best understood. The formation of supercontinents and their breakup appears to be cyclical through Earth's history. There may have been several others before Pangaea.

Paleomagnetic measurements help geologists determine the latitude and orientation of ancient continental blocks, and newer techniques may help determine longitudes. Paleontology helps determine ancient climates, confirming latitude estimates from paleomagnetic measurements, and the distribution of ancient forms of life provides clues on which continental blocks were close to each other at particular geological moments. However, reconstructions of continents prior to Pangaea, including the ones in this section, remain partially speculative, and different reconstructions will differ in some details.

=== Previous supercontinents ===
The fourth-last supercontinent, called Columbia or Nuna, appears to have assembled in the period 2.0–1.8 billion years ago (Ga). Columbia/Nuna broke up, and the next supercontinent, Rodinia, formed from the accretion and assembly of its fragments. Rodinia lasted from about 1.3 billion years ago until about 750 million years ago, but its configuration and geodynamic history are not nearly as well understood as those of the later supercontinents, Pannotia and Pangaea.

According to one reconstruction, when Rodinia broke up, it split into three pieces: proto-Laurasia, proto-Gondwana, and the smaller Congo Craton. Proto-Laurasia and proto-Gondwana were separated by the Proto-Tethys Ocean. Proto-Laurasia split apart to form the continents of Laurentia, Siberia, and Baltica. Baltica moved to the east of Laurentia, and Siberia moved northeast of Laurentia. The split created two oceans, the Iapetus Ocean and Paleoasian Ocean.

Most of these landmasses coalesced again to form the relatively short-lived supercontinent Pannotia, which included large areas of land near the poles and a small strip connecting the polar masses near the equator. Pannotia lasted until 540 Ma, near the beginning of the Cambrian and then broke up, giving rise to the continents of Laurentia, Baltica, and the southern supercontinent Gondwana.

=== Formation of Euramerica (Laurussia) ===
In the Cambrian, Laurentia—which would later become North America—sat on the equator with three bordering oceans: the Panthalassa Ocean to the north and west, the Iapetus Ocean to the south, and the Khanty Ocean to the east. In the early Ordovician, around 480 Ma, the microcontinent Avalonia—a landmass incorporating fragments of what would become eastern Newfoundland, the southern British Isles, and parts of Belgium, northern France, Nova Scotia, New England, South Iberia, and northwest Africa—broke free from Gondwana and began its journey to Laurentia. Baltica, Laurentia, and Avalonia all came together by the end of the Ordovician to form a landmass called Euramerica or Laurussia, closing the Iapetus Ocean. The collision resulted in the formation of the northern Appalachians. Siberia sat near Euramerica, with the Khanty Ocean between the two continents. While all this was happening, Gondwana drifted slowly towards the South Pole. This was the first step of the formation of Pangaea.

=== Collision of Gondwana with Euramerica ===
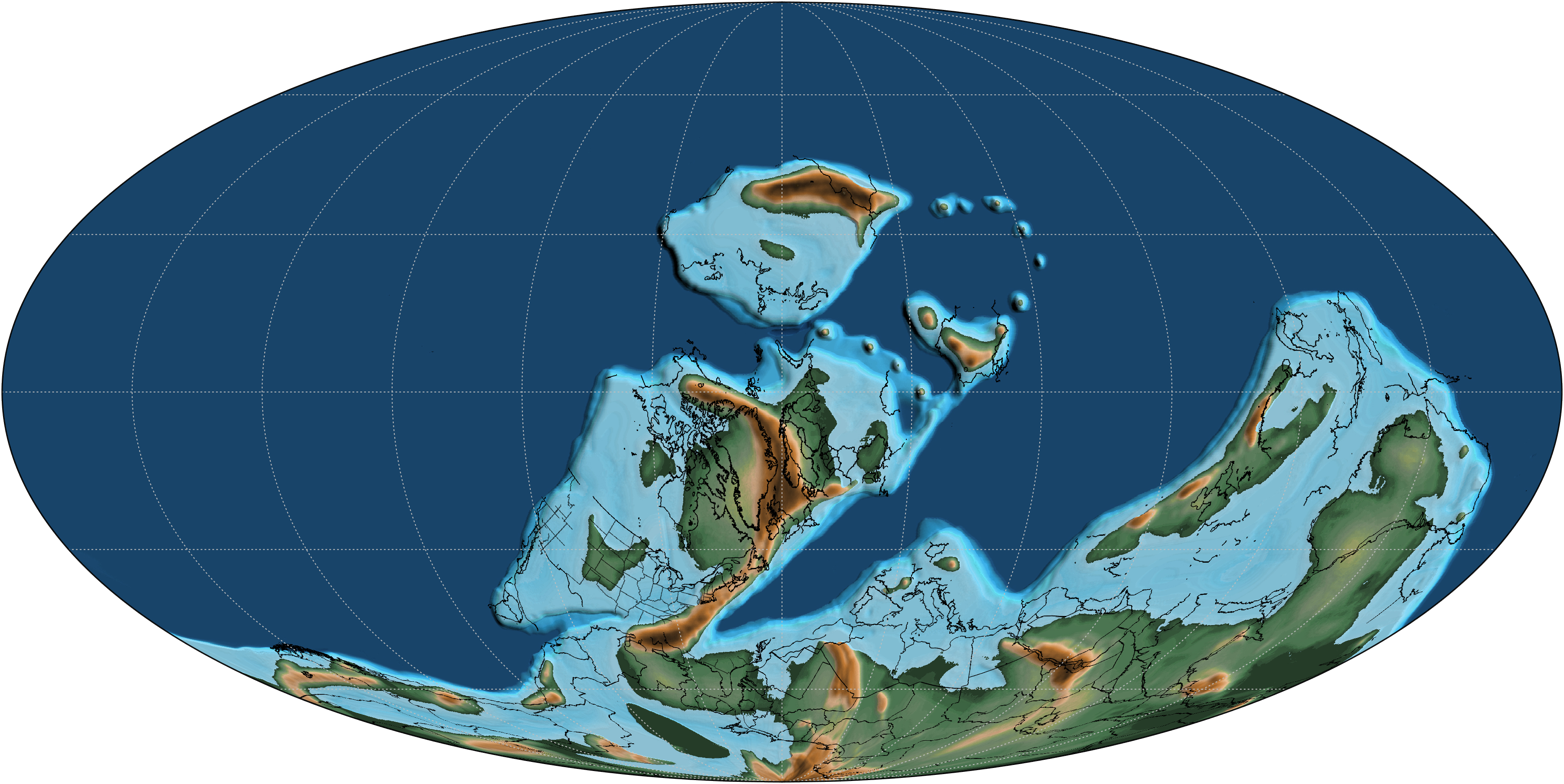
Map of Earth during the Devonian around 390 million years ago

The second step in the formation of Pangaea was the collision of Gondwana with Euramerica. By the middle of the Silurian, 430 Ma, Baltica had already collided with Laurentia, forming Euramerica, an event called the Caledonian orogeny. As Avalonia inched towards Laurentia, the seaway between them, a remnant of the Iapetus Ocean, was slowly shrinking. Meanwhile, southern Europe broke off from Gondwana and began to move towards Euramerica across the Rheic Ocean. It collided with southern Baltica in the Devonian.

By the late Silurian, Annamia (Indochina) and the South China Craton split from Gondwana and moved northward, shrinking the Proto-Tethys Ocean and opening the Paleo-Tethys Ocean to the south. In the Devonian Gondwana moved towards Euramerica, causing the Rheic Ocean to shrink. In the Early Carboniferous, northwest Africa had touched the southeastern coast of Euramerica, creating the southern portion of the Appalachian Mountains, the Meseta Mountains, and the Mauritanide Mountains, an event called the Variscan orogeny. South America moved northward to southern Euramerica, while the eastern portion of Gondwana (India, Antarctica, and Australia) headed toward the South Pole from the equator. North and South China were on independent continents. The Kazakhstania microcontinent had collided with Siberia. (Siberia had been a separate continent for millions of years since the breakup of Pannotia.)

The Variscan orogeny raised the Central Pangaean Mountains, which were comparable to the modern Himalayas in scale.

=== Formation of Laurasia ===
Western Kazakhstania collided with Baltica in the late Carboniferous, closing the Ural Ocean and the western Proto-Tethys (Uralian orogeny), causing the formation of the Ural Mountains and Laurasia. This was the last step of the formation of Pangaea. Meanwhile, South America had collided with southern Laurentia, closing the Rheic Ocean and completing the Variscian orogeny with the formation of the southernmost part of the Appalachians and Ouachita Mountains. By this time, Gondwana was positioned near the South Pole, and glaciers formed in Antarctica, India, Australia, southern Africa, and South America. The North China Craton collided with Siberia by the Jurassic, completely closing the Proto-Tethys Ocean.

By the Early Permian, the Cimmerian plate split from Gondwana and moved towards Laurasia, thus closing the Paleo-Tethys Ocean and forming the Tethys Ocean in its southern end. Most of the landmasses were all in one. By the Triassic, Pangaea rotated a little, and the Cimmerian plate was still travelling across the shrinking Paleo-Tethys until the Middle Jurassic. By the Late Triassic, the Paleo-Tethys had closed from west to east, creating the Cimmerian Orogeny. Pangaea, which looked like a C, with the Tethys Ocean inside the C, had rifted by the Middle Jurassic.

Assembly of Pangaea (490–250 Ma)
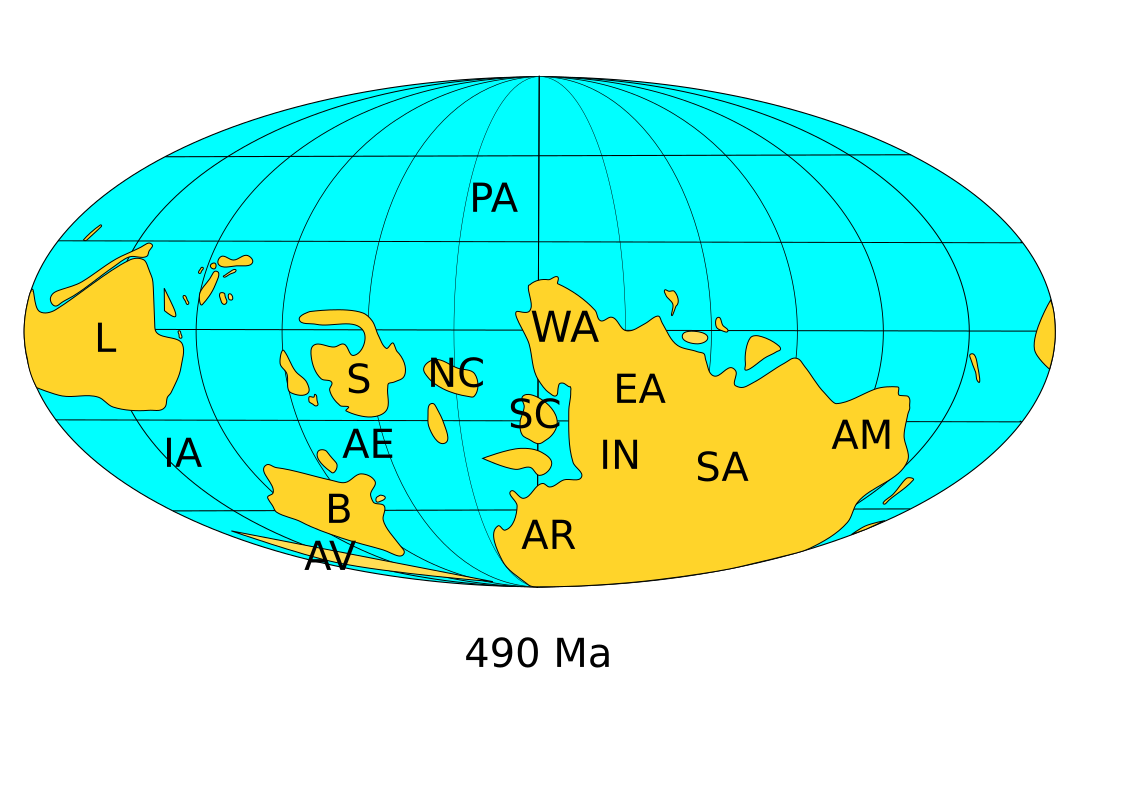
Paleogeography of Earth in the late Cambrian, around 490 Ma

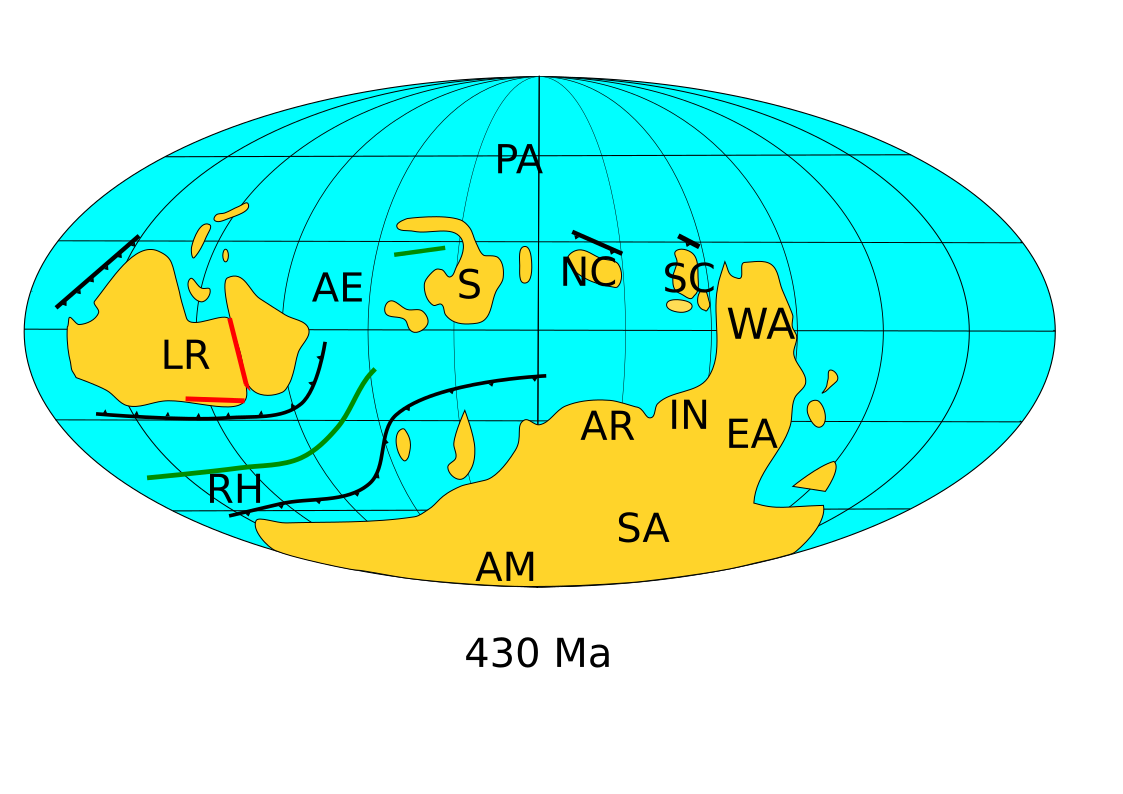
Paleogeography of Earth in the middle Silurian, around 430 Ma. Avalonia and Baltica have fused with Laurentia to form Laurussia.

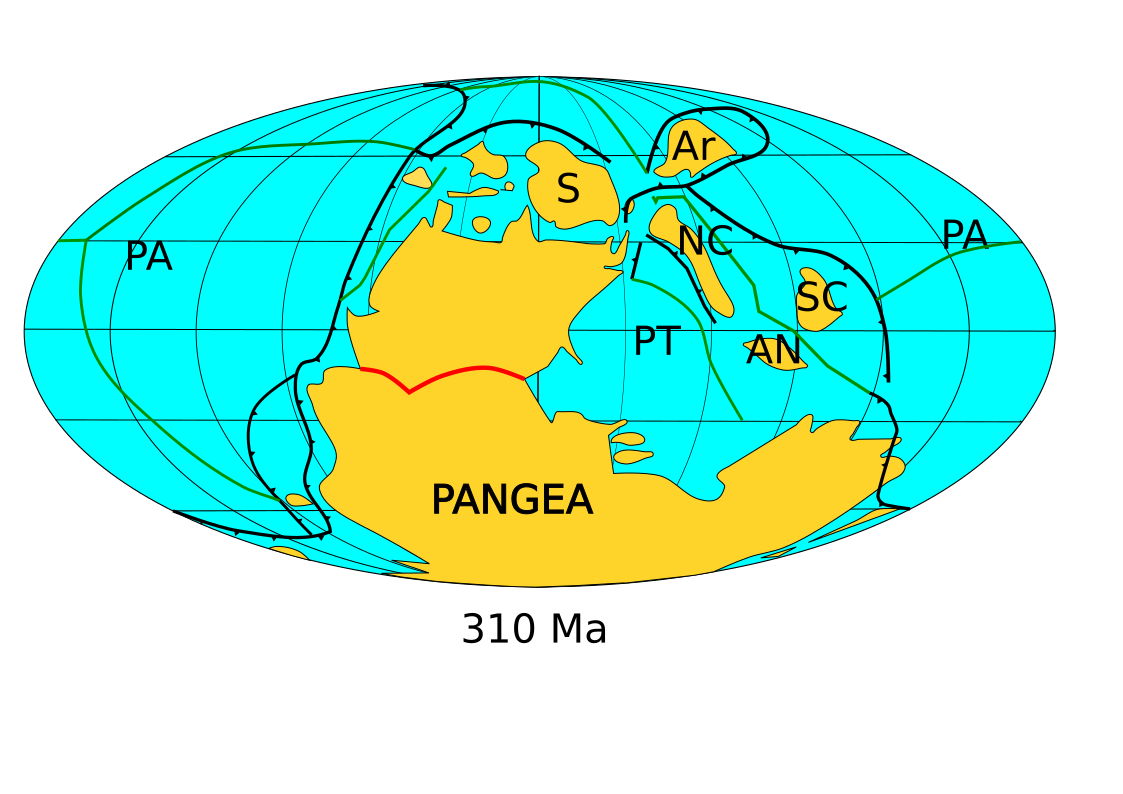
Paleogeography of Earth in the late Carboniferous, around 310 Ma. Laurussia has fused with Gondwana to form Pangaea.

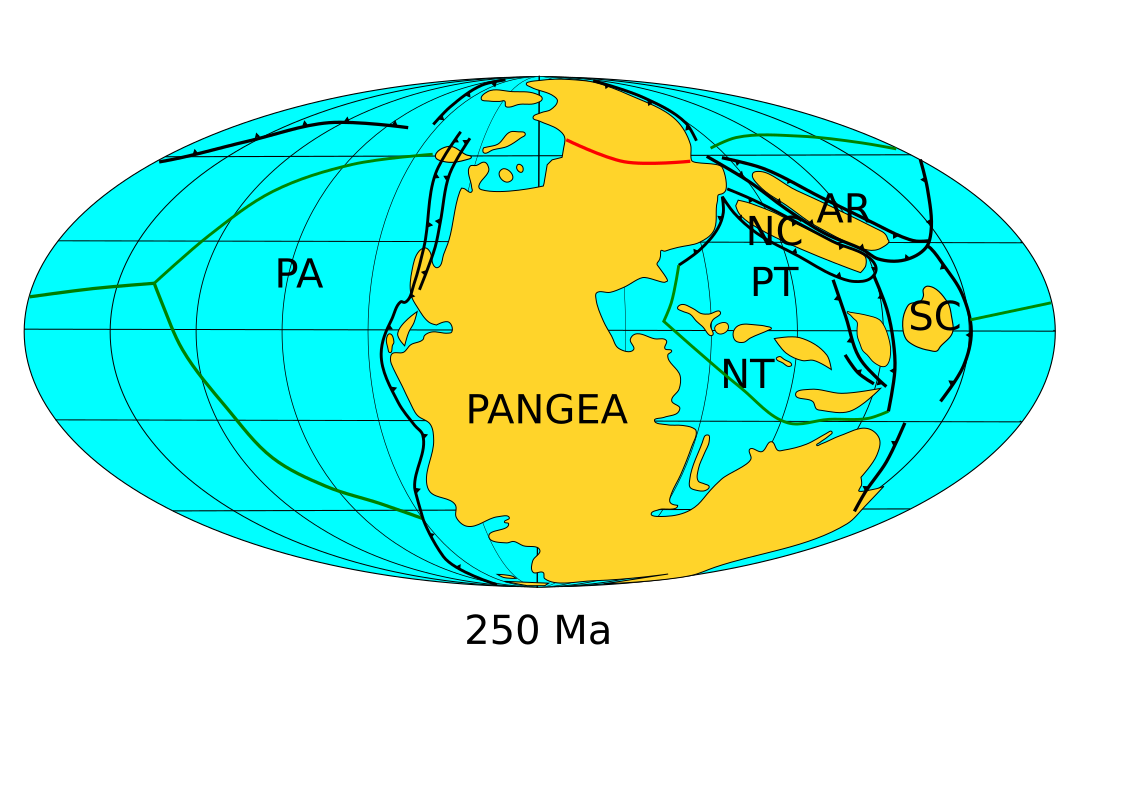
Paleogeography of the Earth at the Permian–Triassic boundary, around 250 Ma. Siberia has fused with Pangaea to complete the assembly of the supercontinent.

== Paleogeography ==
=== Geography during the Carboniferous ===
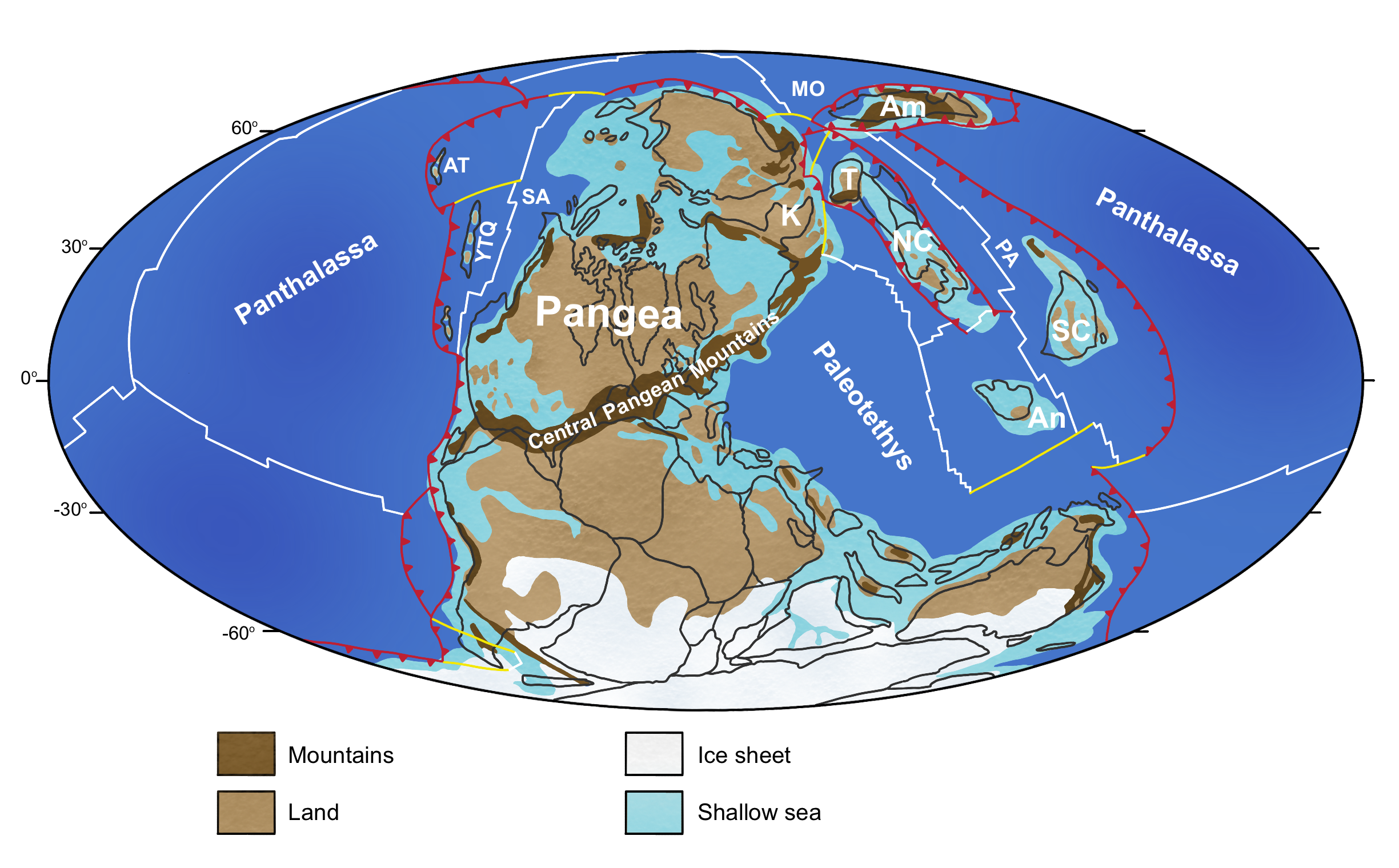
Pangaea during the late Carboniferous period

Pangaea, having formed recently during the late Carboniferous period, had two major landmasses — Gondwana in the south and Laurussia in the north west with Siberia and Amuria lying north of Laurussia. To the east of Siberia — Kazakhstania, North China and South China formed the northern margin of the Paleo-Tethys sea, with Annamia in the south, in together resembling a circle with the superocean Panthalassa lying beyond.

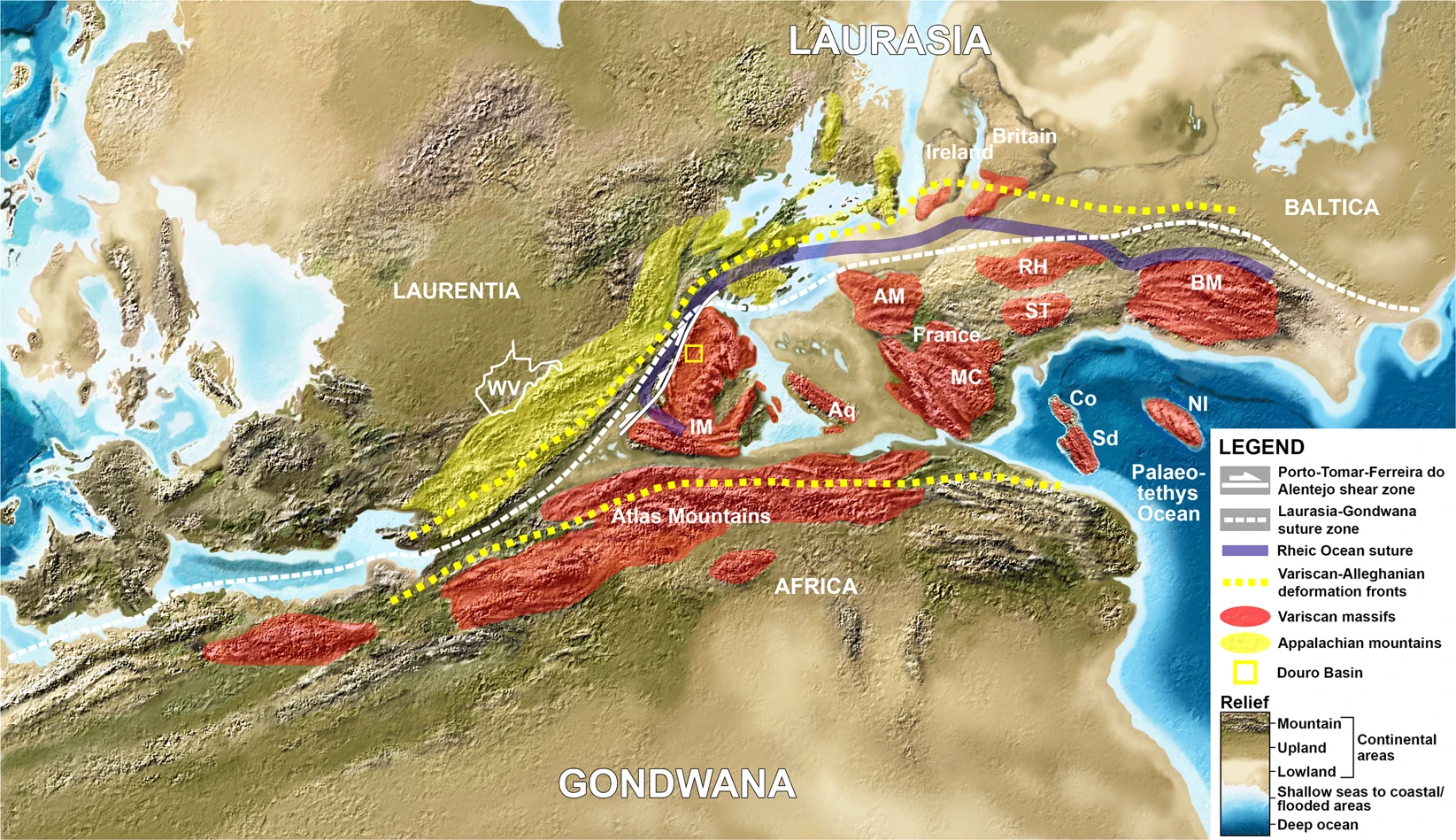
Central Pangaean Mountains during the Late Carboniferous-Early Permian period

This period is also marked by the formation of the Central Pangaean Mountains.

=== Geography during the Permian ===
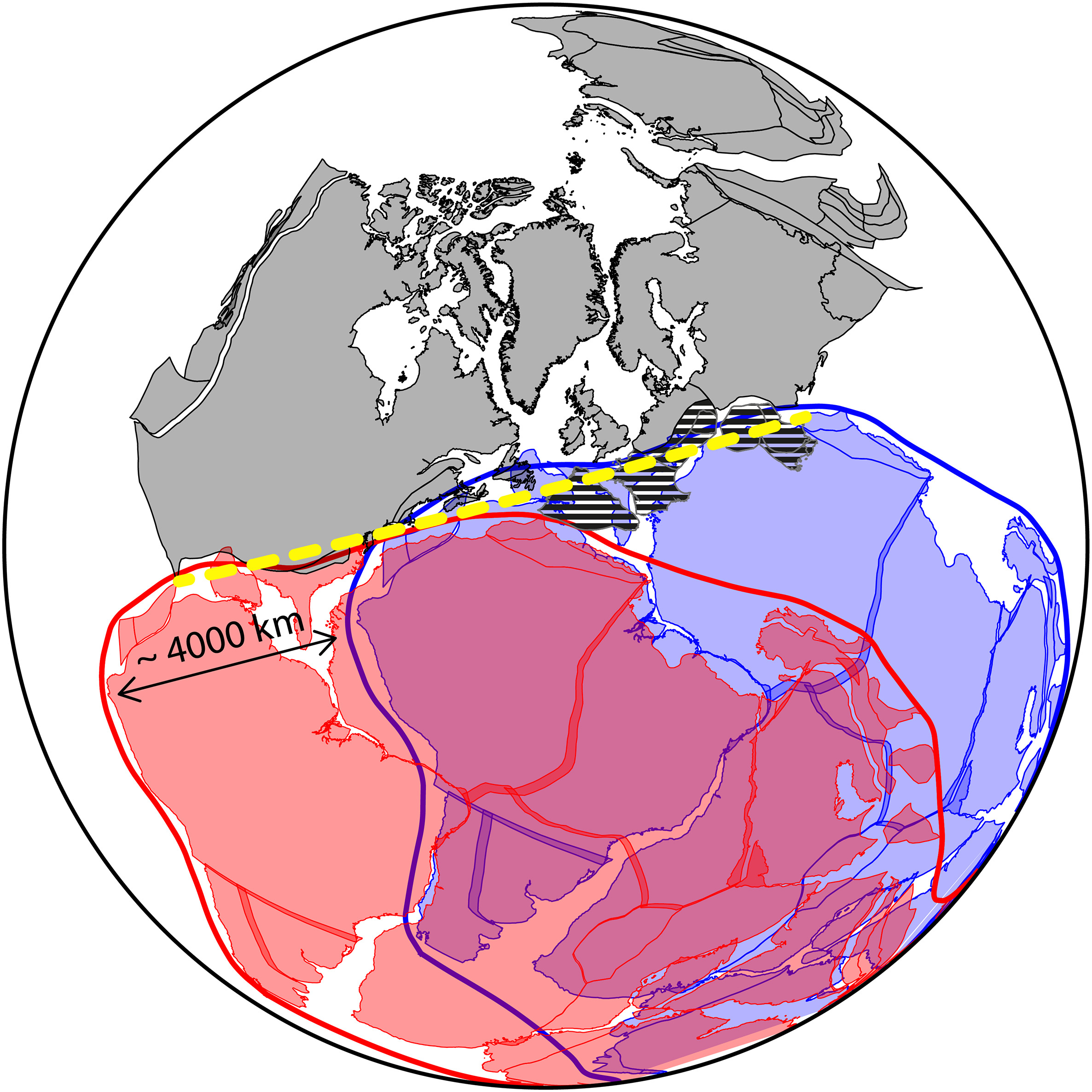
Map of two alternative proposals of the configuration of Pangaea at the Carboniferous-Permian boundary (~300 million years ago), differing in their placement of Gondwana, the classic Wegnerian "Pangea A" (red) and "Pangea B" (blue). Yellow dashed line is the suggested location of the hypothetical megashear. Hatched lines represent the Variscan orogeny.

The paleogeography of Pangaea prior the Late Permian is disputed. A number of authors have argued based on paleomagnetic data, that Pangaea originally exhibited a different configuration than the classic Wegnerian configuration, known as "Pangea B", where Gondwana was shifted over 3,500 kilometres (2,200 mi) northeastwards relative to Laurasia than in the Wegnerian configuration ("Pangea A"), with South America adjacent to eastern North America and western Europe, and that over the course of the Permian, Gondwana moved southwest towards the classic Wegnerian/"Pangea A" configuration along a massive 6,000 kilometres (3,700 mi) long transform megashear. Other authors have questioned the paleomagnetic data, which is only sparsely sampled geographically and temporally, and argue that Pangaea exhibited the classic Wegnerian configuration since its formation in the Carboniferous, and question the supporting evidence for such a massive tectonic displacement implied by the "Pangea B" hypothesis.

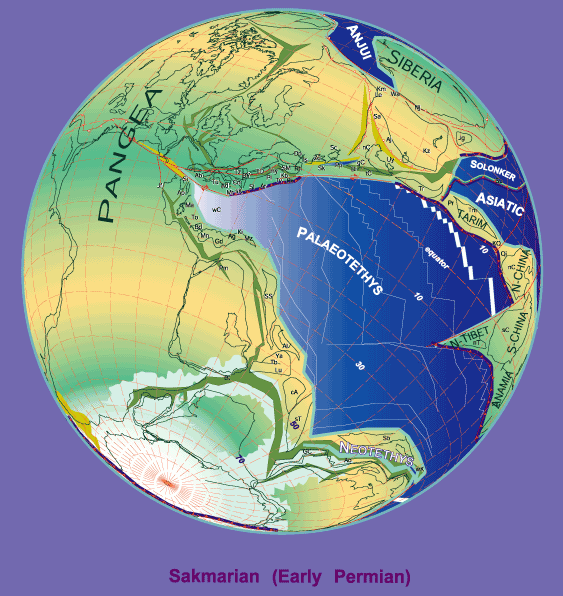
Pangaea and its surrounding water bodies during the Permian period

By the Permian, Pangaea had consolidated in its extent, reaching from the equator to both of the polar regions. Its immense expanse thus had a major influence on the ocean currents of its surrounding water bodies — the superocean Panthalassa and the Paleo-Tethys in addition to the new Neotethys Ocean forming to its south.

The early Permian also saw the Cimmerian plate being rifted and detached from the Gondwanan shores of the Paleo-Tethys, forming the Cimmerian terranes.

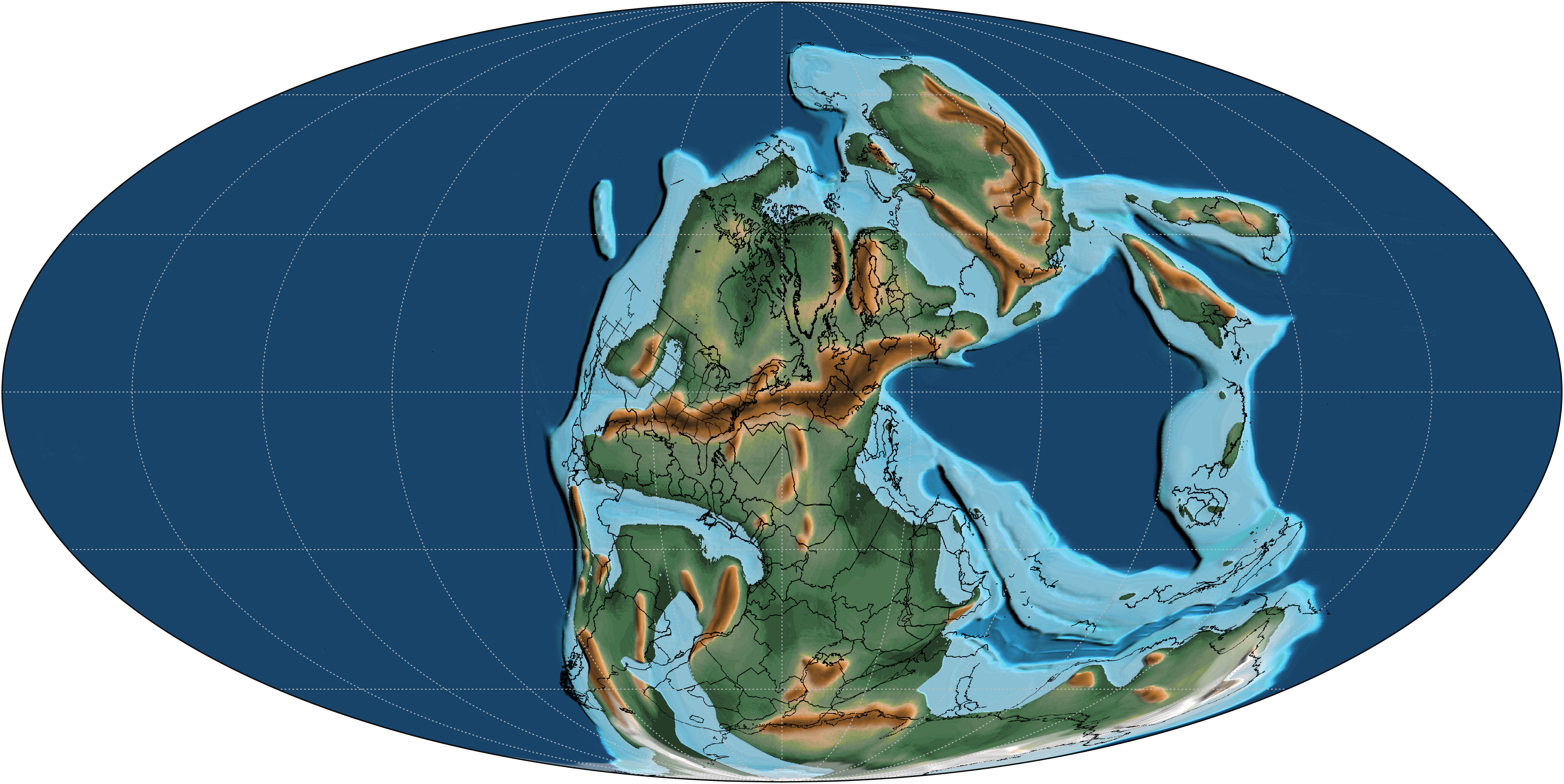
Central Pangean mountain range at the equator of Pangaea during the early Permian period (285 Mya)

The Central Pangaean Mountains reached their maximum elevation during the early Permian (295 Mya) comparable to the present day Himalayan mountain range. These mountains underwent immense physical and mechanical weathering, creating deep valleys and reducing the mountains to half their original elevation by the Lopingian.

By the end of the Permian period, the North China Craton, the South China Block and Indochina fused together and with Pangaea.

=== Geography during the Triassic ===
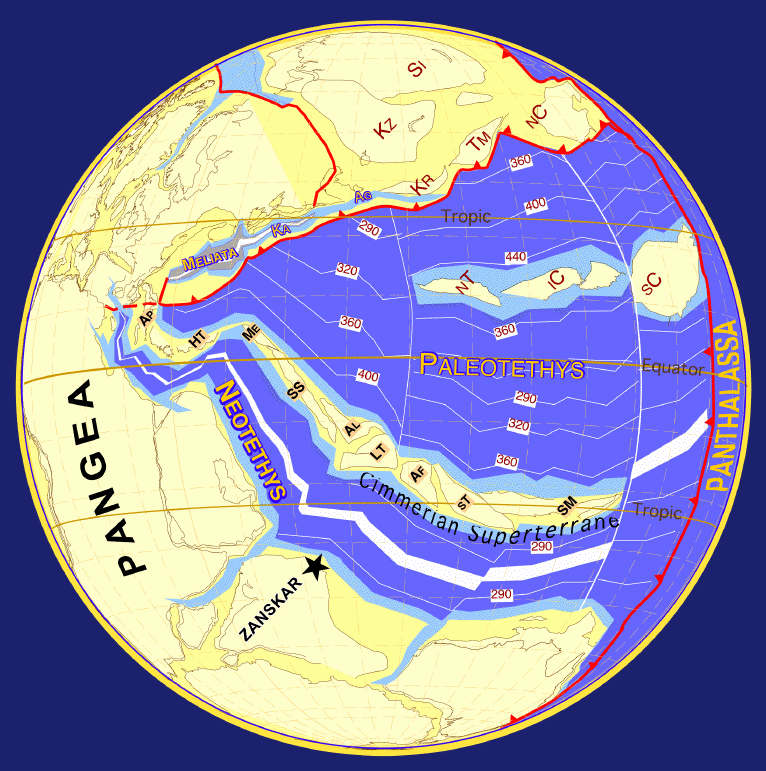
Pangaea at the start of the Triassic period (250 Mya)

Pangaea experienced widespread faulting during the Triassic, also accompanied by a substantial reduction of the Central Pangean Mountains by the Middle Triassic.

The Cimmerian terranes, that had detached from Gondwana in the early Permian drifted northwards during the Triassic, increasing the expanse of the Neo-Tethys Ocean which had formed from this event while shrinking the Paleo-Tethys.

The largest delta plain in Earth's geological history — the Triassic Boreal Ocean Delta Plain formed in Northern Pangaea during this period.

=== Geography during the Jurassic ===
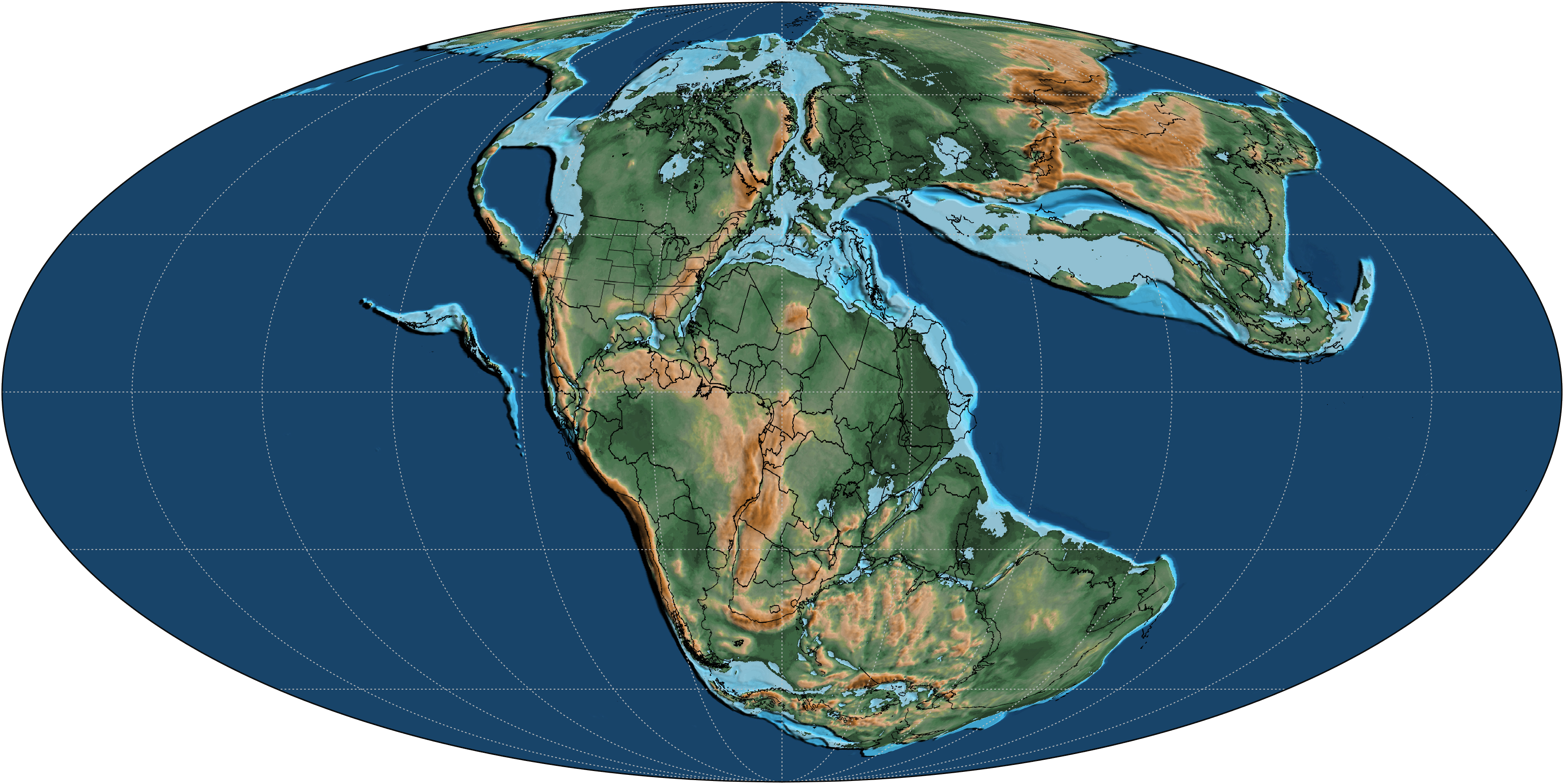
Pangaea starting to disintegrate by the Early Jurassic (190 mya) period

By the Early Jurassic, Pangaea began to rift and break-up into northern Laurasia and southern Gondwana with the Central Pangean Mountains having practically disintegrated. The supercontinent finally broke up by the Middle Jurassic period.

== Paleoclimate ==
Since Pangaea existed for a span of millions of years, from the late Carboniferous period up until the early Jurassic period, its climate varied across these periods. Due to its geographic extent, it experienced significant climatic variations.

=== Interior climate ===
The inner parts of the supercontinent were, in comparison to its shores, significantly drier and cooler, likely forming one of the most extensive desert systems in Earth's geological history with extreme variations of heat and cold (continental climate), though several paleoclimatologists have found evidence of short rainy seasons in the interior regions.

=== Oceanic influences ===
Pangaea's climate was also influenced by the water bodies of that era (the superocean Panthalassa, the Paleo Tethys and the Tethys seas). The Paleo Tethys and Tethys seas, surrounded on their peripheries by various parts of Pangaea together formed an immense warm water sea and isolated the equatorial waters of Panthalassa from cold ocean currents. This warm-water system also influenced the supercontinent's climate by bringing tropical moisture laden-air from the surrounding seas over the land, henceforth causing rainfall.

=== Monsoons and rainfall ===
- During the late Carboniferous, regions of present day Europe and Eastern North America experienced significant wetter, swamp like conditions due to the Central Pangean Mountains forming a perennial monsoon climate in that area close to the equator, contrasting the dry conditions of the Colorado Plateau. By the end of the Carboniferous, the equatorial regions of Pangaea became drier.
- During the Permian period, the landmass received seasonal rainfall in contrast to the aforementioned dryness. However, the regions lying north of the Central Pangaean Mountains received little precipitation as they lied in the rain shadow of the mountain range which blocked monsoon winds from the Southern Hemisphere.
- During the Triassic period, the monsoons reached their maximum extent, such that the previously dry conditions of the Colorado Plateau were alleviated and it started to receive moisture due to the changing wind directions. In contrast, the regions of present day Australia were at higher latitudes and experienced much drier and seasonal conditions around the same time.
- During the Jurassic, the megamonsoon declined and the regions of Gondwana and southern Laurasia experienced dry conditions.

=== Post-breakup ===
When Pangaea finally broke apart by the middle Mesozoic era, the megamonsoon fell apart completely. The breakup could have contributed to an increase in polar temperatures as colder waters mixed with warmer waters, also accompanied by outgassing of large quantities of carbon dioxide from continental rifts. This produced a Mesozoic CO_{2} high that contributed to the very warm climate of the Early Cretaceous. The opening of the Tethys Ocean also contributed to the warming of the climate. The very active mid-ocean ridges associated with the breakup of Pangaea raised sea levels to the highest in the geological record, flooding much of the continents.

== Life ==
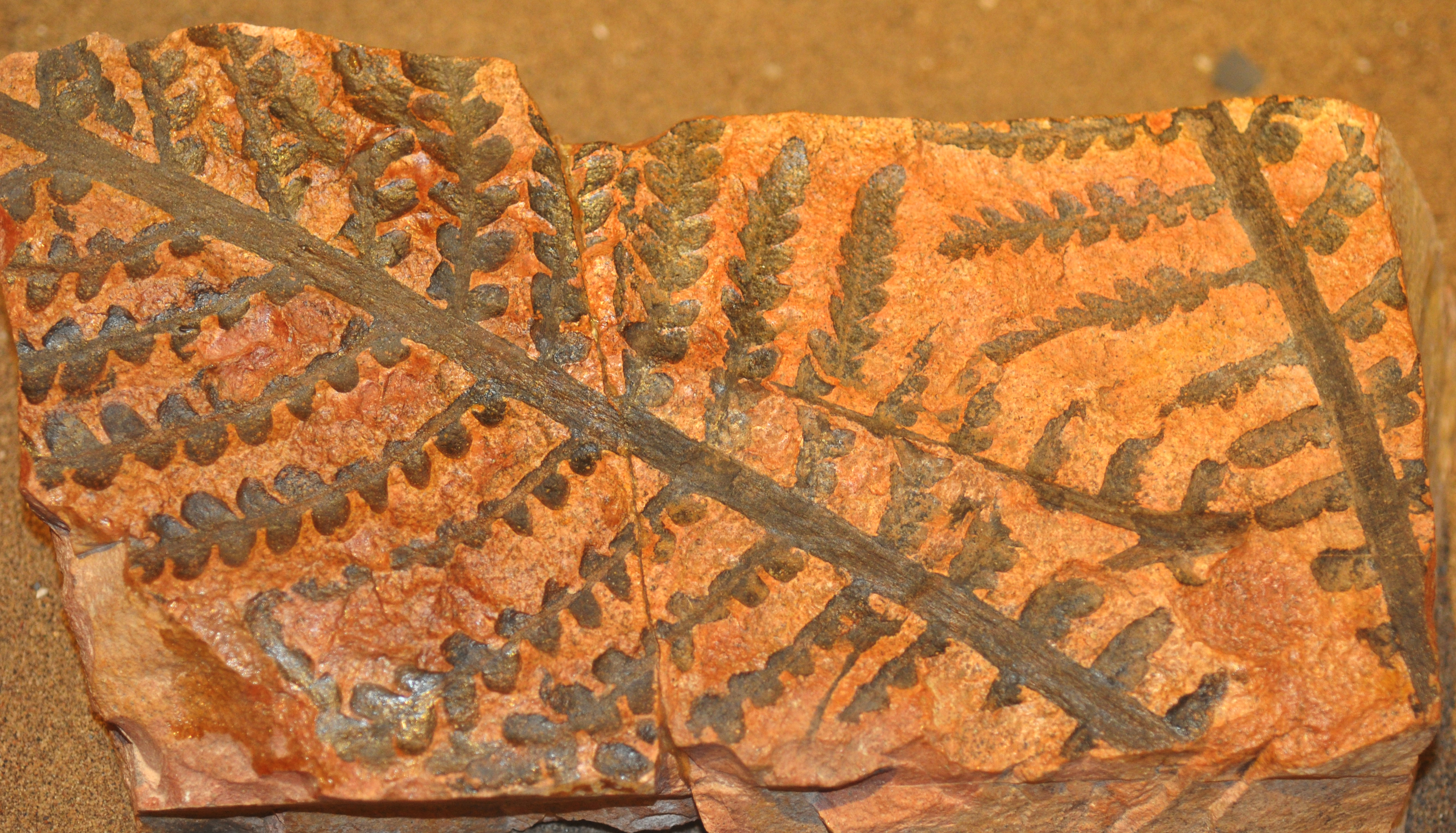
Fossil Dicroidium zuberi leaf from the Early Triassic of Argentina. Dicroidium was a ubiquitous tree across much of southern Pangaea during the Triassic period.

The four floristic provinces of the world at the Permian-Carboniferous boundary, 300 million years ago

Pangaea existed as a supercontinent for 160 million years, from its assembly around 335 Ma (Early Carboniferous) to its breakup 175 Ma (Middle Jurassic). During this interval, important developments in the evolution of life took place. The seas of the Early Carboniferous were dominated by rugose corals, brachiopods, bryozoans, sharks, and the first bony fish. Life on land was dominated by lycopsid forests inhabited by insects and other arthropods and the first tetrapods. By the time Pangaea broke up, in the Middle Jurassic, the seas swarmed with molluscs (particularly ammonites), ichthyosaurs, sharks and rays, and ray-finned bony fishes, while life on land was dominated by forests of cycads and conifers in which dinosaurs flourished and in which the first true mammals had appeared.

The evolution of life in this time reflected the conditions created by the assembly of Pangaea. The union of most of the continental crust into one landmass reduced the extent of sea coasts. Increased erosion from uplifted continental crust increased the importance of floodplain and delta environments relative to shallow marine environments. Continental assembly and uplift also meant increasingly arid land climates, favoring the evolution of amniote animals and seed plants, whose eggs and seeds were better adapted to dry climates. The early drying trend was most pronounced in western Pangaea, which became a center of the evolution and geographical spread of amniotes.

Coal swamps typically form in perpetually wet regions close to the equator. The assembly of Pangaea disrupted the Intertropical Convergence Zone and created an extreme monsoon climate that reduced the deposition of coal to its lowest level in the last 300 million years. During the Permian, coal deposition was largely restricted to the North and South China microcontinents, which were among the few areas of continental crust that had not joined with Pangaea. The extremes of climate in the interior of Pangaea are reflected in bone growth patterns of pareiasaurs and the growth patterns in gymnosperm forests.

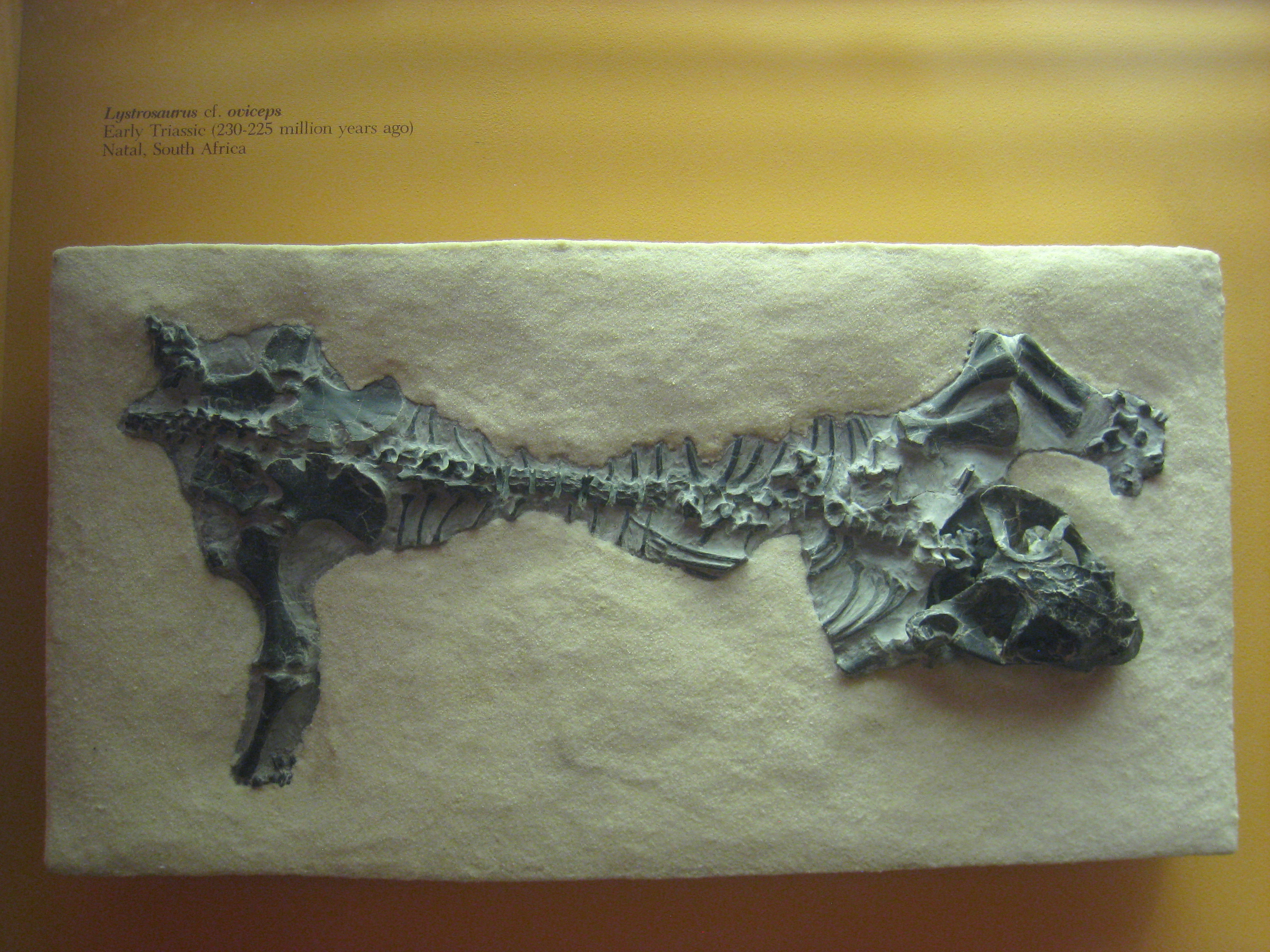
Early Triassic Lystrosaurus fossil from South Africa. During the Early Triassic, Lystrosaurus had a cosmopolitan distribution across Pangaea, stretching from Antarctica to China.

The lack of oceanic barriers is thought to have favored cosmopolitanism, in which successful species attain wide geographical distribution. Cosmopolitanism was also driven by mass extinctions, including the Permian–Triassic extinction event, the most severe in the fossil record, and also the Triassic–Jurassic extinction event. These events resulted in disaster fauna showing little diversity and high cosmopolitanism, including Lystrosaurus, which opportunistically spread to every corner of Pangaea following the Permian–Triassic extinction event. On the other hand, there is evidence that many Pangaean species were provincial, with a limited geographical range, despite the absence of geographical barriers. This may be due to the strong variations in climate by latitude and season produced by the extreme monsoon climate. For example, cold-adapted pteridosperms (early seed plants) of Gondwana were blocked from spreading throughout Pangaea by the equatorial climate, and northern pteridosperms ended up dominating Gondwana in the Triassic. The expansion of the temperate climate zones that accompanied the breakup of Pangaea may have contributed to the diversification of the angiosperms.

=== Mass extinctions ===
The tectonics and geography of Pangaea may have worsened the Permian–Triassic extinction event or other mass extinctions. For example, the reduced area of continental shelf environments may have left marine species vulnerable to extinction. However, no evidence for a species-area effect has been found in more recent and better characterized portions of the geologic record. Another possibility is that reduced seafloor spreading associated with the formation of Pangaea, and the resulting cooling and subsidence of oceanic crust, may have reduced the number of islands that could have served as refugia for marine species. Species diversity may have already been reduced prior to mass extinction events due to mingling of species possible when formerly separate continents were merged. However, there is strong evidence that climate barriers continued to separate ecological communities in different parts of Pangaea. The eruptions of the Emeishan Traps may have eliminated South China, one of the few continental areas not merged with Pangaea, as a refugium.

== Rifting and break-up ==
Separation of Pangaea

There were three major phases in the break-up of Pangaea.

=== Opening of the Atlantic ===
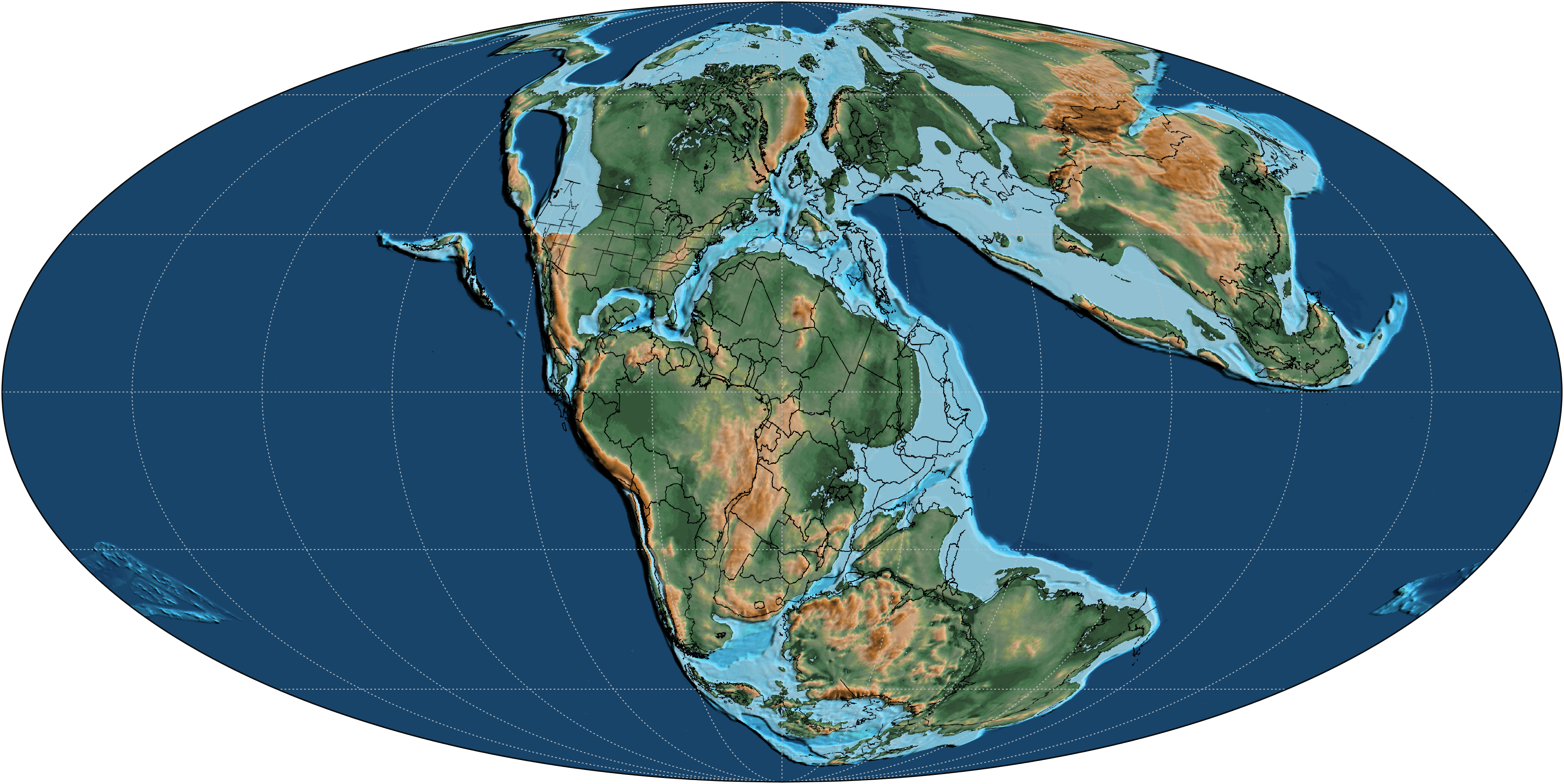
Map of Earth around 170 million years ago during the Early Jurassic, demonstrating opening of the North Atlantic

The Atlantic Ocean did not open uniformly; rifting began in the north-central Atlantic. The first breakup of Pangaea is proposed for the late Ladinian (230 Ma) with the formation of large half grabens. By 201 Ma, the Central Atlantic magmatic province, which was one of the largest eruptions in Earth's history erupted ~3 million cubic kilometers of basalt. Then the rifting proceeded along the eastern margin of North America, the northwest African margin and the High, Saharan and Tunisian Atlas Mountains.

Another phase began in the Early-Middle Jurassic (about 175 Ma), when Pangaea began to rift from the Tethys Ocean in the east to the Pacific Ocean in the west. The rifting that took place between North America and Africa produced multiple failed rifts. One rift resulted in the North Atlantic Ocean.

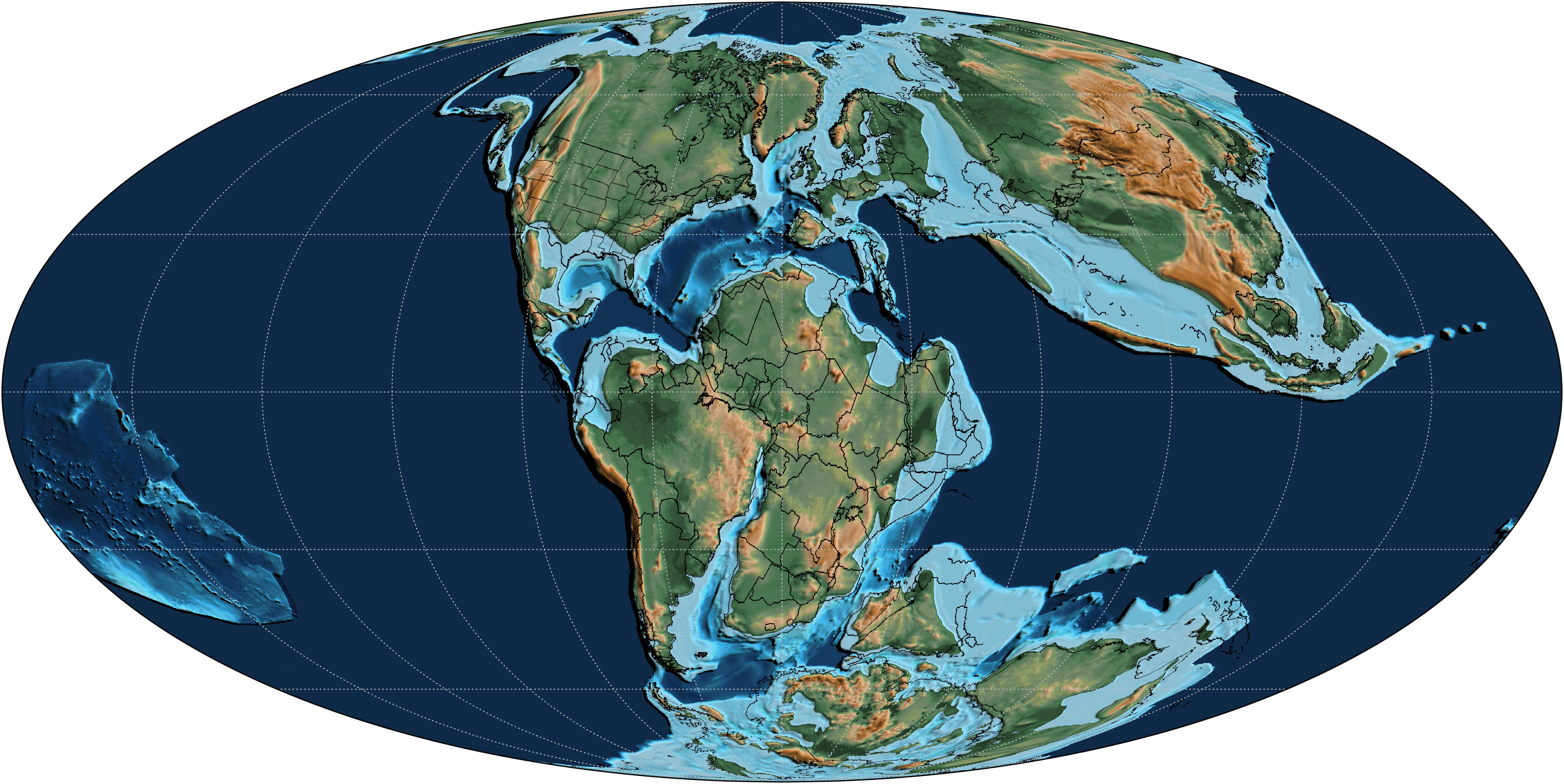
Map of Earth around 120 million years ago, during the Early Cretaceous

The South Atlantic did not open until the Cretaceous when Laurasia started to rotate clockwise and moved northward with North America to the north, and Eurasia to the south. The clockwise motion of Laurasia led much later to the closing of the Tethys Ocean and the widening of the "Sinus Borealis", which later became the Arctic Ocean. Meanwhile, on the other side of Africa and along the adjacent margins of east Africa, Antarctica and Madagascar, rifts formed that led to the formation of the southwestern Indian Ocean in the Cretaceous.

=== Break-up of Gondwana ===
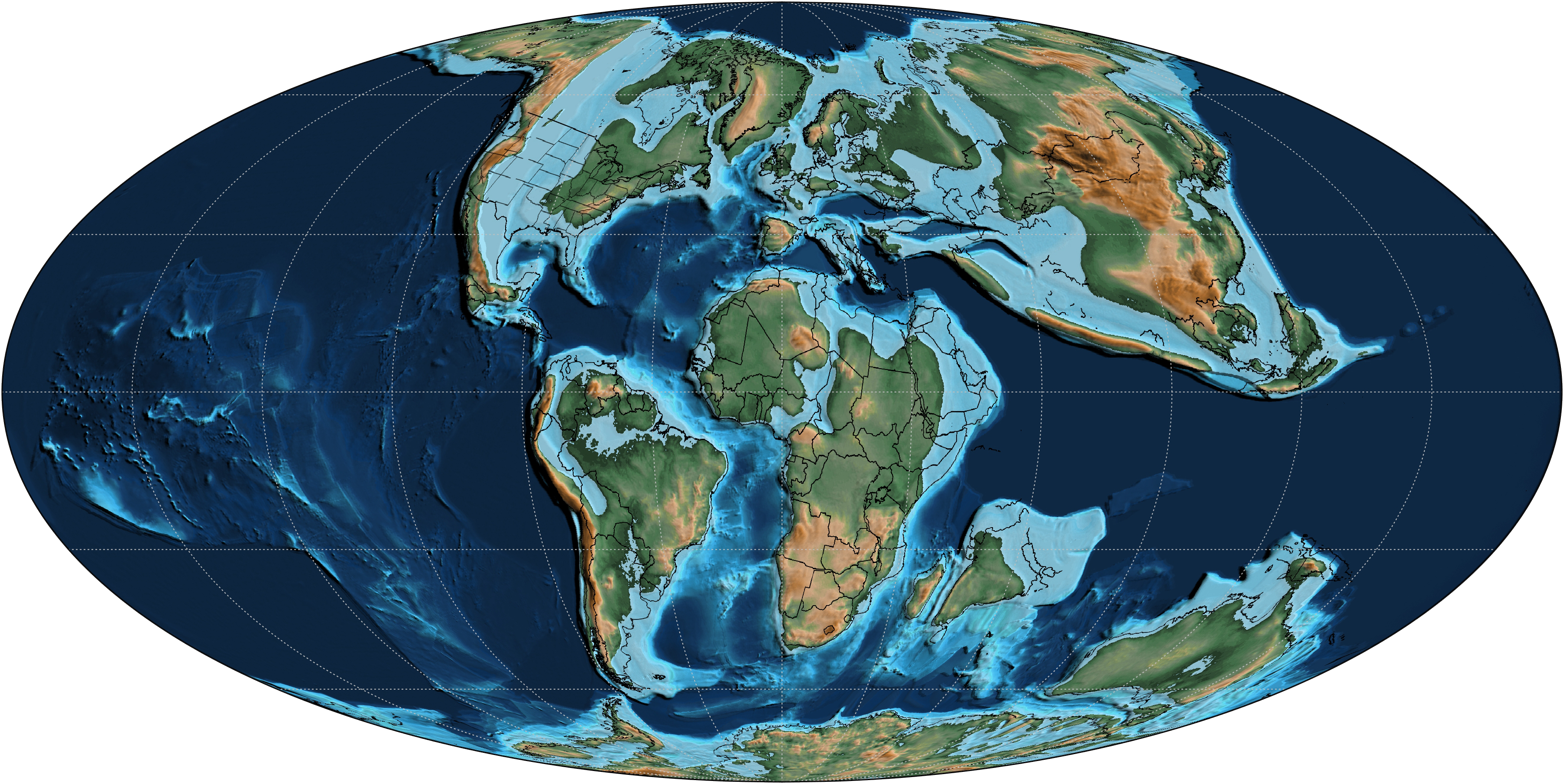
Map of Earth around 85 million years ago, during the Late Cretaceous

The second major phase in the break-up of Pangaea began in the Early Cretaceous (150–140 Ma), when Gondwana separated into multiple continents (Africa, South America, India, Antarctica, and Australia). The subduction at Tethyan Trench probably caused Africa, India and Australia to move northward, causing the opening of a "South Indian Ocean". In the Early Cretaceous, Atlantica, today's South America and Africa, separated from eastern Gondwana. Then in the Middle Cretaceous, Gondwana fragmented to open up the South Atlantic Ocean as South America started to move westward away from Africa. The South Atlantic did not develop uniformly; rather, it rifted from south to north.

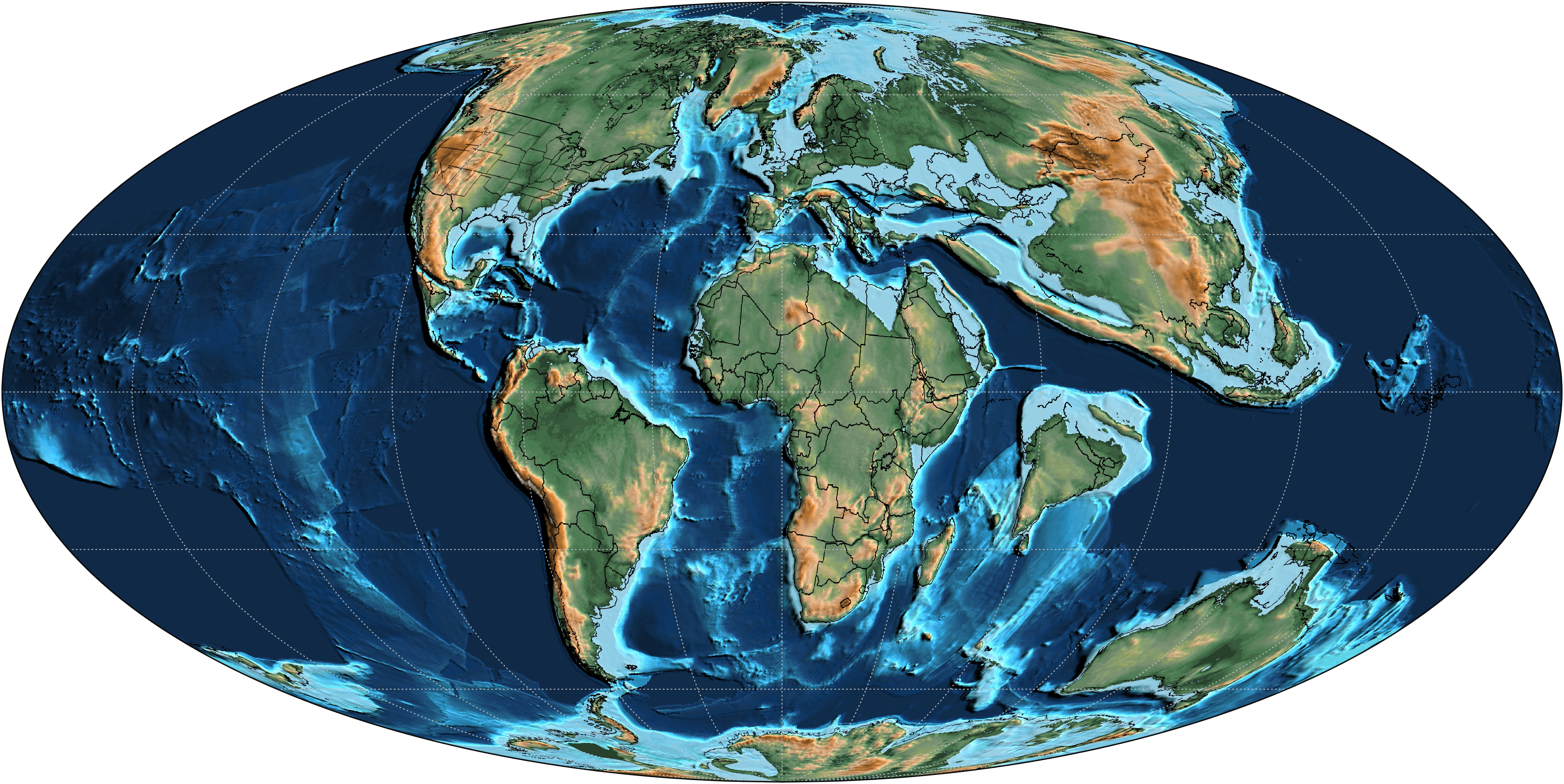
Map of Earth around 60 million years ago, during the Early Cenozoic (Paleocene)

Also, at the same time, Madagascar and Insular India began to separate from Antarctica and moved northward, opening up the Indian Ocean. Madagascar and India separated from each other 100–90 Ma in the Late Cretaceous. India continued to move northward toward Eurasia at 15 centimeters (6 in) per year (a plate tectonic record), closing the eastern Tethys Ocean, while Madagascar stopped and became locked to the African Plate. New Zealand, New Caledonia and the rest of Zealandia began to separate from Australia, moving eastward toward the Pacific and opening the Coral Sea and Tasman Sea.

=== Opening of the Norwegian Sea and break-up of Australia and Antarctica ===
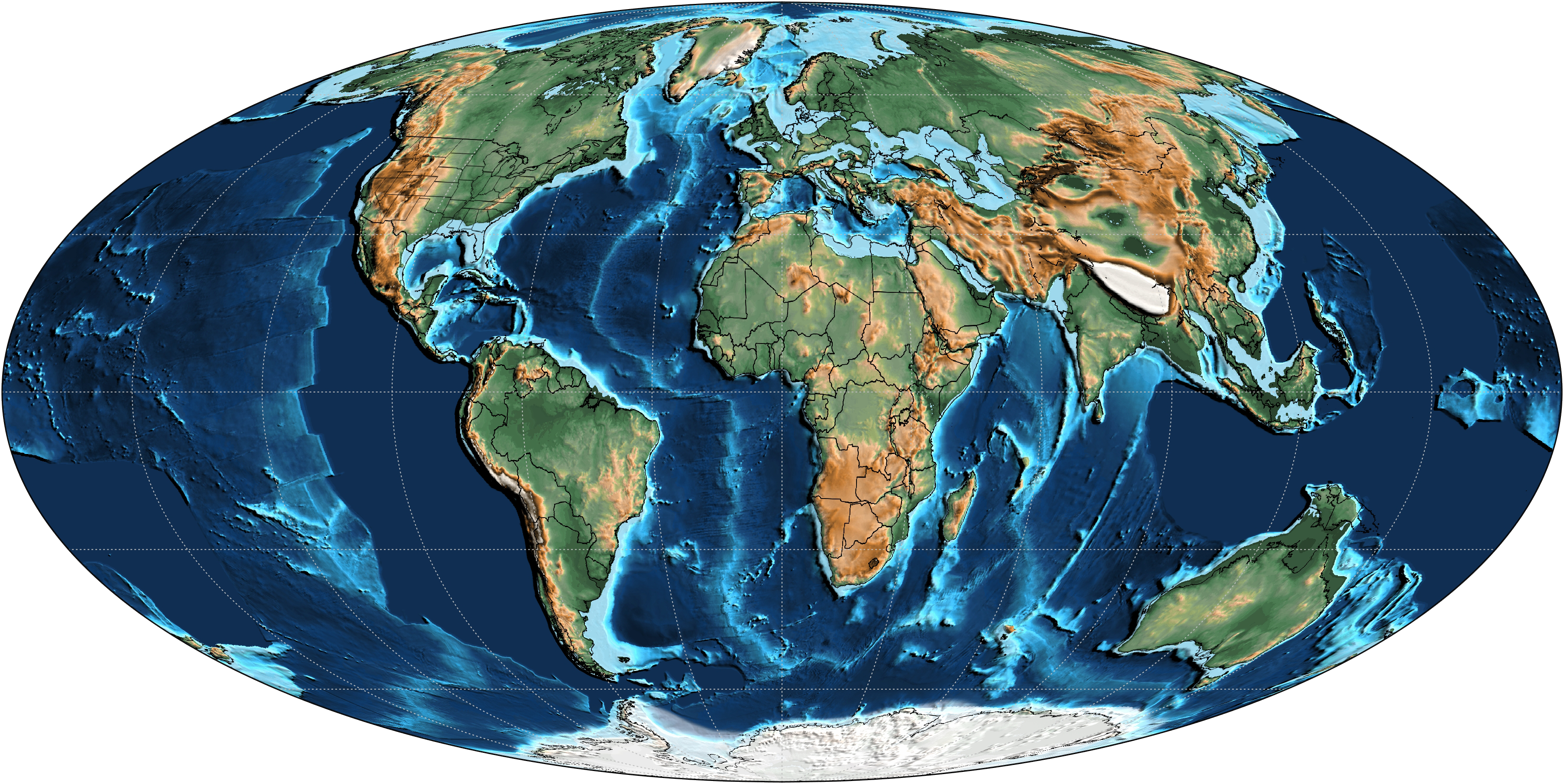
Map of Earth around 30 million years ago, during the mid-Cenozoic (Oligocene)

The third major and final phase of the break-up of Pangaea occurred in the early Cenozoic (Paleocene to Oligocene). Laurasia split when Laurentia broke from Eurasia, opening the Norwegian Sea about 60–55 Ma. The Atlantic and Indian Oceans continued to expand, closing the Tethys Ocean.

Meanwhile, Australia split from Antarctica and moved quickly northward, just as India had done more than 40 million years before. Australia is currently on a collision course with eastern Asia. Both Australia and India are currently moving northeast at 5–6 centimeters (2–3 in) per year. Antarctica has been near or at the South Pole since the formation of Pangaea about 280 Ma. India started to collide with Asia beginning about 35 Ma, forming the Himalayan orogeny and closing the Tethys Ocean; this collision continues today. The African Plate started to change directions, from west to northwest toward Europe, and South America began to move in a northward direction, separating it from Antarctica and allowing complete oceanic circulation around Antarctica for the first time. This motion, together with decreasing atmospheric carbon dioxide concentrations, caused a rapid cooling of Antarctica and allowed glaciers to form. This glaciation eventually coalesced into the kilometers-thick ice sheets seen today. Other major events took place during the Cenozoic, including the opening of the Gulf of California, the uplift of the Alps, and the opening of the Sea of Japan. The break-up of Pangaea continues today in the Red Sea Rift and East African Rift.

== See also ==
- History of Earth
- Potential future supercontinents: Amasia, Aurica, Pangaea Proxima, Novopangaea
- Supercontinent cycle
- Wilson Cycle

== Sources ==
- Torsvik, Trond H.; Cocks, L. Robin M. (2016a). Earth History and Palaeogeography. doi:10.1017/9781316225523. ISBN 978-1-316-22552-3.
- Stanley, Steven M. (1998). Earth System History. W. H. Freeman. ISBN 978-0-7167-2882-5.
