= Mauritanide Belt =

Ancient orogen parallel to the west coast of Africa from Morocco to Guinea-Bissau

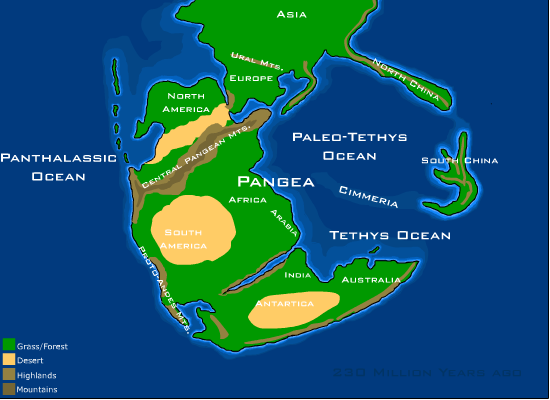
Paleogeographic reconstruction of the supercontinent Pangaea, including the Central Pangean Mountains of which the Mauritanide Belt formed a part.

The Mauritanide Belt is an ancient orogen running parallel to the west coast of Africa from Morocco to Guinea-Bissau. The orogeny that formed the Mauritanide Belt was active between 320 and 270 million years ago in the Carboniferous and Permian. During this time period the eastern nappes of the belt thrust over rocks of Devonian age in the Taoudeni Basin. During the Triassic the Mauritanide Belt was split from the Appalachian Mountains (with which it was previously a single orogen) as the Atlantic Ocean opened.
