= Cold trap (astronomy) =

Concept in planetary sciences

A crater on the northern part of Ceres contains a region that is always in shadow. This permanently shadowed region may contain large amounts of water ice.

A cold trap is a concept in planetary science that describes an area cold enough to freeze (trap) volatiles. Cold traps can exist on the surfaces of airless bodies or in the upper layers of an adiabatic atmosphere. On airless bodies, the ices trapped inside cold traps can potentially remain there for geologic time periods, providing a glimpse into the primordial solar system. In adiabatic atmospheres, cold traps prevent volatiles (such as water) from escaping the atmosphere into space.

== Cold traps on airless planetary bodies ==
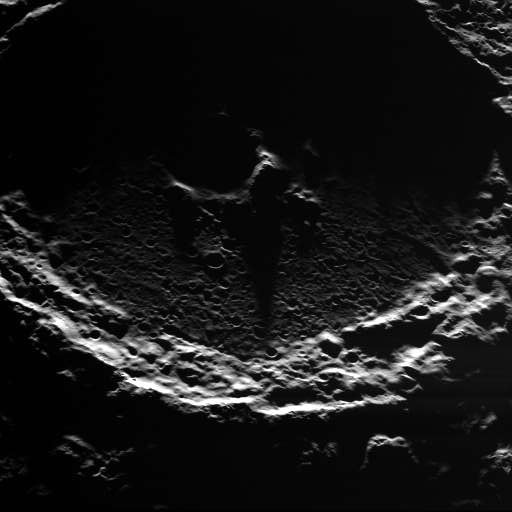
The floor of Prokofiev crater near Mercury's north pole never experiences sunlight.

The obliquity (axial tilt) of some airless planetary bodies in the Solar System, such as Mercury, the Moon,and Ceres, is very close to zero. Harold Urey first noted that depressions or craters located near the poles of these bodies would cast persistent shadows that can survive for geologic time periods (millions–billions of years). The absence of an atmosphere prevents mixing by convection, rendering these shadows extremely cold. If molecules of volatiles such as water ice travel into these permanent shadows, they become trapped for geologic time periods.

=== Studying cold traps on airless bodies ===
As these shadows receive no insolation, most of the heat they receive comes from scattered and emitted radiation from the surrounding topography. Usually, horizontal heat conduction from adjacent warmer areas can be neglected because of the high porosity and therefore low thermal conductivity of the uppermost layers of airless bodies. Consequently, the temperatures of these permanent shadows can be modeled using ray-casting or ray-tracing algorithms coupled with 1D vertical heat conduction models. In some cases, such as bowl-shaped craters, it is possible to obtain an expression for the equilibrium temperature of these shadows.

Additionally, the temperatures (and therefore the stability) of cold traps can be remotely sensed by an orbiter. The temperatures of lunar cold traps have been extensively studied by the Lunar Reconnaissance Orbiter's Diviner radiometer. On Mercury, evidence for ice deposits inside cold traps has been obtained through radar, reflectance, and visible imagery. On Ceres, cold traps have been detected by the Dawn spacecraft.

== Atmospheric cold traps ==
In atmospheric science, a cold trap is a region of the atmosphere that is substantially colder than the layers below it. For example, in Earth's tropical tropopause layer, air temperature drops with increasing height until it reaches a minimum cold point. This region acts as a cold trap because it dehydrates ascending air masses. As water vapor rises from the troposphere, the extreme cold forces it to freeze into ice crystals, which gravitationally settle back into the lower atmosphere before they can reach the stratosphere.

For biological life on Earth, the atmospheric cold trap plays a critical role in preserving the planet's water supply over geological timescales. At the temperature minimum of the tropopause, ascending moist air is effectively freeze-dried to its equilibrium water vapor concentration, strictly limiting the abundance of water at stratospheric altitudes where photolysis occurs. Without this cold trap mechanism to confine moisture to the lower atmosphere, water vapor would freely ascend into the upper atmosphere and undergo photolysis via intense solar ultraviolet radiation, causing the lighter hydrogen atoms to permanently escape into space.

Planetary scientists attribute the extreme dryness of Venus to the historical absence of an atmospheric cold trap. In a warm, primitive Venusian atmosphere, a high surface concentration of water vapor would bypass condensation, elevating the mixing ratio at the cold trap and allowing moisture to freely ascend into the upper atmosphere where hydrogen escaped into space.

The Earth's cold trap is located about 12 km above sea level, well below the height at which water vapor would be permanently split apart into hydrogen and oxygen by solar UV rays, with the former irreversibly being lost to space. Because of the cold trap in the Earth's atmosphere, the Earth is losing water to space at a rate of only about 1 millimeter of ocean every 1 million years. At that rate, it would take trillions of years for all of its water to disappear, a timescale far longer than Earth's remaining life expectancy. A warmer atmosphere can hold more moisture, consistent with the Clausius–Clapeyron relation. Even with localized warming, the modern cold trap remains robust enough to prevent significant water vapor from being lost to space.

However, the gradual luminosity increase of the Sun as it ages will weaken the cold trap over the next billion years by driving a warmer troposphere and stratosphere. This will elevate the mixing ratio of water vapor at the tropopause, allowing moisture to bypass the freeze-drying effect and ascend into the upper atmosphere where it will be dissociated by solar UV rays, leaving hydrogen to escape into space. As a result, the Earth is projected to ultimately lose its oceans to space in approximately 1 to 1.3 billion years, well before the Sun expands into a red giant.

As pointed out by Peter Ward and Donald Brownlee in their book The Life and Death of Planet Earth, the process of ocean loss has only been documented twice: first during the Apollo 16 Moon mission, when the mission's astronauts observed Earth using a unique Carruthers camera, and again during the 1990s through studies based on observations made by astronauts aboard the Space Shuttle.

Saturn's moon Titan has a very weak cold trap that is only able to retain some of its atmospheric methane. Thus, it has been suggested that Titan is the closest analog to what Earth's atmosphere will look like as Earth's cold trap fails, with methane instead of water and hydrocarbon products of photochemistry instead of oxygen and ozone.

Cold traps are thought to function for oxygen on Ganymede.
