= Rare Earth hypothesis =

Hypothesis that planets with complex life are extremely rare

The Rare Earth hypothesis argues that planets with complex life, like Earth, are exceptionally rare.

In planetary astronomy and astrobiology, the Rare Earth hypothesis argues that the origin of life and the evolution of biological complexity, such as sexually reproducing, multicellular organisms on Earth, and subsequently human intelligence, required an improbable combination of astrophysical and geological events and circumstances. According to the hypothesis, complex extraterrestrial life is an improbable phenomenon and likely to be rare throughout the universe as a whole. The term "Rare Earth" originates from Rare Earth: Why Complex Life Is Uncommon in the Universe (2000), a book by Peter Ward, a geologist and paleontologist, and Donald E. Brownlee, an astronomer and astrobiologist, both faculty members at the University of Washington. The hypothesis has been argued to be a possible solution to the Fermi paradox.

In the 1970s and 1980s, Carl Sagan and Frank Drake, among others, argued that Earth is a typical rocky planet in a typical planetary system, located in a non-exceptional region of a common type of galaxy, now known to be a barred spiral galaxy. From the principle of mediocrity (extended from the Copernican principle), they argued that the evolution of life on Earth, including human beings, was also typical, and therefore complex life should be common throughout the universe. In contrast, Ward and Brownlee argue that planets which meet all the requirements for complex life are in fact exceedingly rare.

== Fermi paradox ==
There is no reliable evidence that extraterrestrial organisms of any kind have visited Earth. No transmissions or evidence of intelligent life have been detected or observed anywhere other than Earth in the universe. This runs counter to the knowledge that the universe is filled with a very large number of planets, some of which likely hold conditions hospitable for life. Life typically expands until it fills all available niches. These contradictory facts form the basis for the Fermi paradox, of which the Rare Earth hypothesis is one proposed solution.

== Requirements for complex life ==
Life timeline
← / Earth formed; ← / Earliest water; ← / LUCA; ← / Earliest fossils; ← / Great Oxygenation Event; ← / Sexual reproduction; ← / Earliest fungi; ← / Neoproterozoic oxygenation event; ← / Ediacaran biota; ← / Cambrian explosion; ← / Earliest tetrapods; ← / Earliest hominoid
(million years ago)

The Rare Earth hypothesis argues that the evolution of biological complexity anywhere in the universe requires the coincidence of a large number of fortuitous circumstances, including, among others, a galactic habitable zone; a central star and planetary system having the requisite character (i.e. a circumstellar habitable zone); a terrestrial planet of the right mass; the advantage of one or more gas giant guardians like Jupiter (which deflect or absorb potential impactors) and possibly a large natural satellite to shield the planet from frequent impact events; conditions needed to ensure the planet has a magnetosphere and plate tectonics; a chemistry similar to that present in the Earth's lithosphere, atmosphere, and oceans; the influence of periodic "evolutionary pumps" such as massive glaciations and bolide impacts; and whatever factors may have led to the emergence of eukaryotic cells, sexual reproduction, and the Cambrian explosion of animal, plant, and fungi phyla. The evolution of human beings and of human intelligence may have required yet further specific events and circumstances, all of which are extremely unlikely to have happened were it not for the Cretaceous–Paleogene extinction event 66 million years ago removing dinosaurs as the dominant terrestrial vertebrates.

In order for a small rocky planet to support complex life, Ward and Brownlee argue, the values of several variables must fall within narrow ranges. The universe is so vast that it might still contain many Earth-like planets, but if such planets exist, they are likely to be separated from each other by many thousands of light-years. Such distances may preclude communication among any intelligent species that may evolve on such planets, which would solve the Fermi paradox which wonders: if extraterrestrial aliens are common, why aren't they obvious?

=== The right location in the right kind of galaxy ===
Rare Earth suggests that much of the known universe, including large parts of the Milky Way galaxy, are "dead zones" unable to support complex life. Those parts of a galaxy where complex life is possible make up the galactic habitable zone, which is primarily characterized by distance from the Galactic Center.

1. As that distance increases, star metallicity declines. Metals (which in astronomy refers to all elements other than hydrogen and helium) are necessary for the formation of terrestrial planets.
2. The X-ray and gamma ray radiation from the black hole at the Galactic Center, and from nearby neutron stars, becomes less intense as distance increases. Thus the early universe, and present-day galactic regions where stellar density is high and supernovae are common, will be dead zones.
3. Gravitational perturbation of planets and planetesimals by nearby stars becomes less likely as the density of stars decreases. Hence the further a planet lies from the Galactic Center or a spiral arm, the less likely it is to be struck by a large bolide which could extinguish all complex life on a planet.

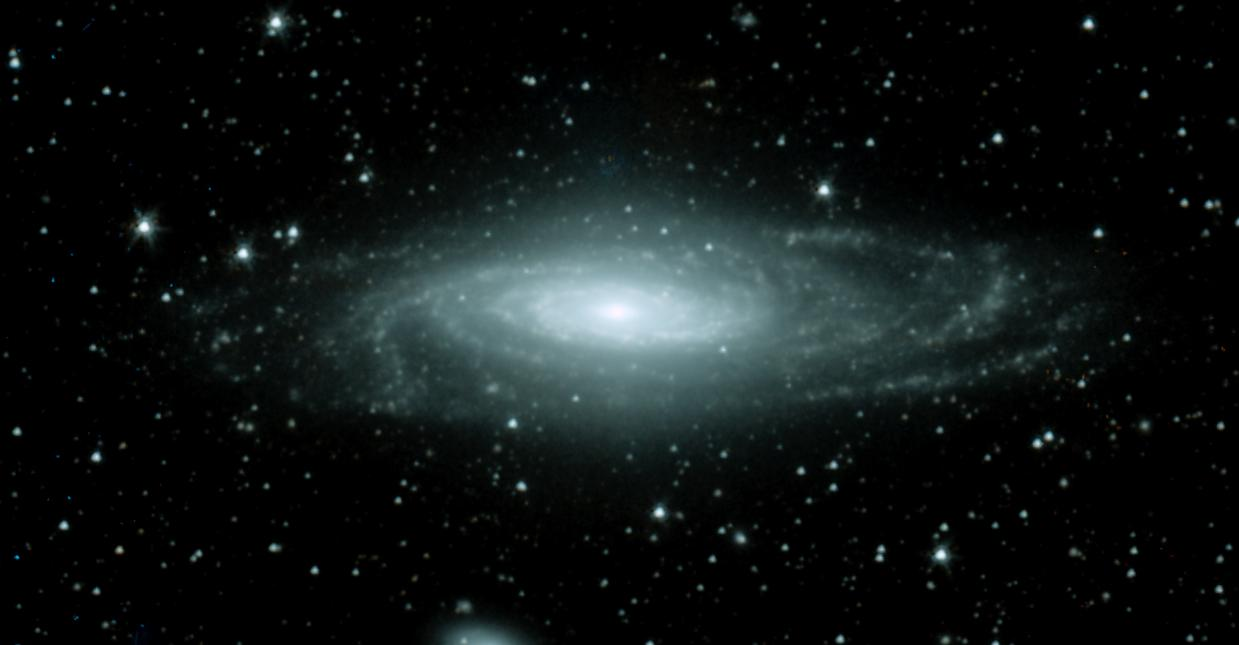
Dense centers of galaxies such as NGC 7331 have high radiation levels hostile to complex life.

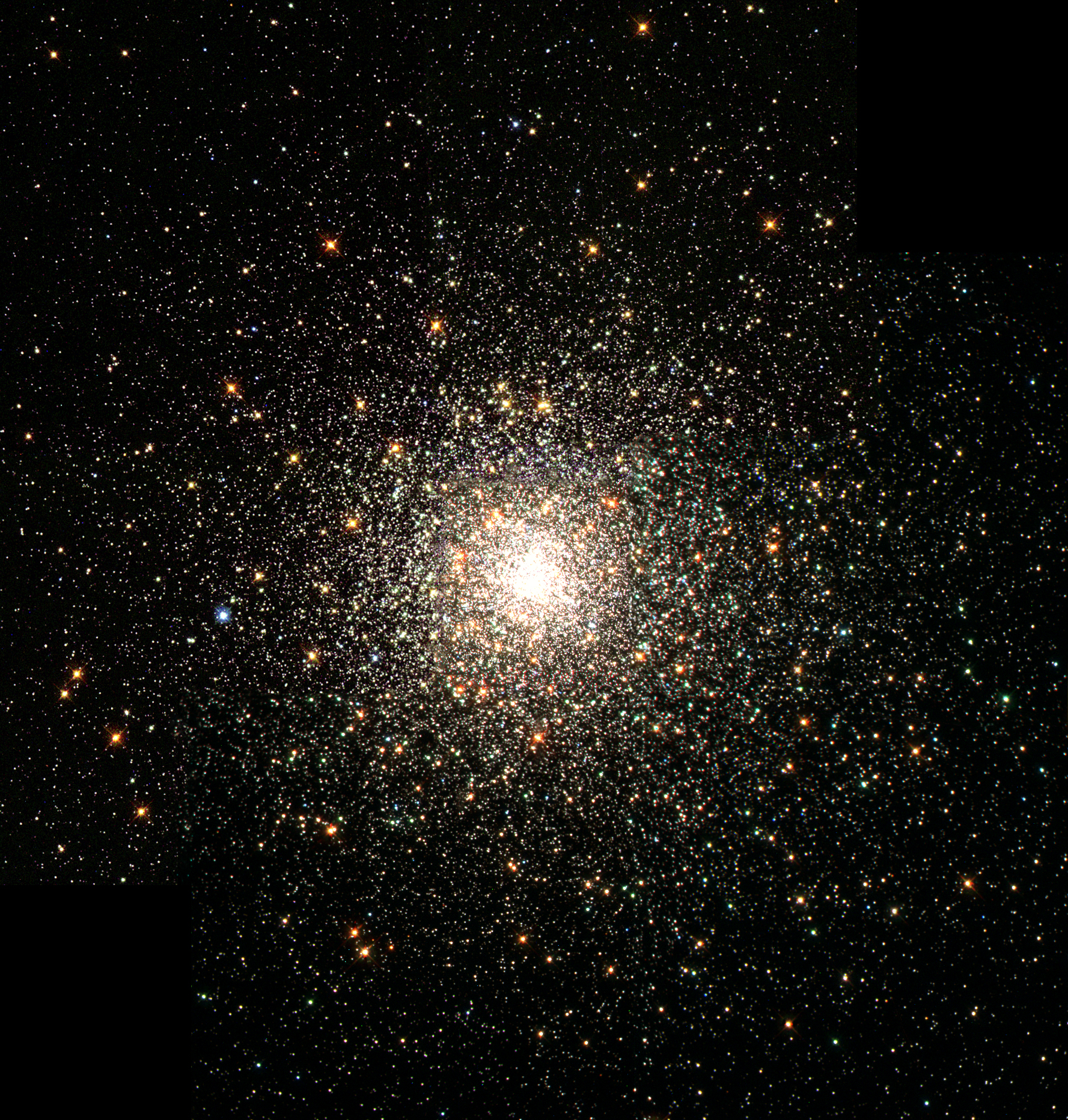
According to the Rare Earth hypothesis, globular clusters are unlikely to support life.

Item #1 rules out the outermost reaches of a galaxy; #2 and #3 rule out galactic inner regions. Hence a galaxy's habitable zone may be a relatively narrow ring of adequate conditions sandwiched between its uninhabitable center and outer reaches.

Also, a habitable planetary system must maintain its favorable location long enough for complex life to evolve. A star with an eccentric (elliptical or hyperbolic) galactic orbit will pass through some spiral arms, unfavorable regions of high star density; thus a life-bearing star must have a galactic orbit that is nearly circular, with a close synchronization between the orbital velocity of the star and of the spiral arms. This further restricts the galactic habitable zone within a fairly narrow range of distances from the Galactic Center. Lineweaver et al. calculate this zone to be a ring 7 to 9 kiloparsecs in radius, including no more than 10% of the stars in the Milky Way, about 20 to 40 billion stars. Gonzalez et al. would halve these numbers; they estimate that at most 5% of stars in the Milky Way fall within the galactic habitable zone.

Approximately 77% of observed galaxies are spiral, two-thirds of all spiral galaxies are barred, and more than half, like the Milky Way, exhibit multiple arms. According to Rare Earth, our own galaxy is unusually quiet and dim (see below), representing just 7% of its kind. Even so, this would still represent more than 200 billion galaxies in the known universe.

The Milky Way galaxy also appears unusually favorable in suffering fewer collisions with other galaxies over the last 10 billion years, which can cause more supernovae and other disturbances. Also, the Milky Way's central black hole seems to have neither too much nor too little activity.

The orbit of the Sun around the center of the Milky Way is indeed almost perfectly circular, with a period of 226 Ma (million years), closely matching the rotational period of the galaxy. However, the majority of stars in barred spiral galaxies populate the spiral arms rather than the halo and tend to move in gravitationally aligned orbits, so there is little that is unusual about the Sun's orbit. While the Rare Earth hypothesis predicts that the Sun should rarely, if ever, have passed through a spiral arm since its formation, astronomer Karen Masters has calculated that the orbit of the Sun takes it through a major spiral arm approximately every 100 million years. Some researchers have suggested that several mass extinctions do indeed correspond with previous crossings of the spiral arms.

=== The right orbital distance from the right type of star ===
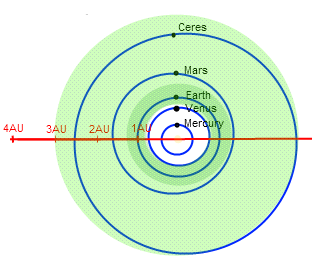
According to the hypothesis, Earth has an improbable orbit in the very narrow habitable zone (dark green) around the Sun.

The terrestrial example suggests that complex life requires liquid water, the maintenance of which requires an orbital distance neither too close nor too far from the central star, another scale of habitable zone or Goldilocks principle. The habitable zone varies with the star's type and age.

For advanced life, the star must also be highly stable, which is typical of middle star life, about 4.6 billion years old. Proper metallicity and size are also important to stability. The Sun has a low (0.1%) luminosity variation. To date, no solar twin star, with an exact match of the Sun's luminosity variation, has been found, though some come close. The star must also have no stellar companions, as in binary systems, which would disrupt the orbits of any planets. Estimates suggest 50% or more of all star systems are binary. Stars gradually brighten over time and it takes hundreds of millions or billions of years for animal life to evolve. The requirement for a planet to remain in the habitable zone even as its boundaries move outwards over time restricts the size of what Ward and Brownlee call the "continuously habitable zone" for animals. They cite a calculation that it is very narrow, within 0.95 and 1.15 astronomical units (one AU is the distance between the Earth and the Sun), and argue that even this may be too large because it is based on the whole zone within which liquid water can exist, and water near boiling point may be much too hot for animal life.

The liquid water and other gases available in the habitable zone bring the benefit of the greenhouse effect. Even though the Earth's atmosphere contains a water vapor concentration from 0% (in arid regions) to 4% (in rainforest and ocean regions) and – as of November 2022 – only 417.2 parts per million of CO_{2}, these small amounts suffice to raise the average surface temperature by about 40 °C, with the dominant contribution being due to water vapor.

All known life requires the complex chemistry of metallic elements. The absorption spectrum of a star reveals the presence of metals within, and studies of stellar spectra reveal that many, perhaps most, stars are poor in metals. Because heavy metals originate in supernova explosions, metallicity increases in the universe over time. Low metallicity characterizes the early universe: globular clusters and other stars that formed when the universe was young, stars in most galaxies other than large spirals, and stars in the outer regions of all galaxies. Metal-rich central stars capable of supporting complex life are therefore believed to be most common in the less dense regions of the larger spiral galaxies—where radiation also happens to be weak.

The chemical composition of a planet can affect the redox conditions at the planet's surface; for example, Hycean planets would have extremely reducing, hydrogen-rich atmospheres, while oxide-rich planets may lose their surface water rapidly through photolysis. Complex biospheres may be limited to a small minority of planetary systems with Sun-like compositions. For example, Walton et al. (2026) argue that a precise balance of the amount of oxygen in the mantle is necessary to ensure that enough nitrogen and phosphorus remains in the mantle during formation.

=== The right arrangement of planets around the star ===
Depiction of the Sun and planets of the Solar System and the sequence of planets. Rare Earth argues that without such an arrangement, in particular the presence of the massive gas giant Jupiter (the fifth planet from the Sun and the largest), complex life on Earth would not have arisen.

Rare Earth proponents argue that a planetary system capable of sustaining complex life must be structured more or less like the Solar System, with small, rocky inner planets and massive outer gas giants. Without the protection of such "celestial vacuum cleaner" planets, such as Jupiter, with strong gravitational pulls, other planets would be subject to more frequent catastrophic asteroid collisions. An asteroid only twice the size of the one which caused the Cretaceous–Paleogene extinction might have wiped out all complex life.

Observations of exoplanets have shown that arrangements of planets similar to the Solar System are rare. Most planetary systems have super-Earths, several times larger than Earth, close to their star, whereas the Solar System's inner region has only a few small rocky planets and none inside Mercury's orbit. Only 10% of stars have giant planets similar to Jupiter and Saturn, and those few rarely have stable, nearly circular orbits distant from their star. Konstantin Batygin and colleagues argue that these features can be explained if, early in the history of the Solar System, Jupiter and Saturn drifted towards the Sun, sending showers of planetesimals towards the super-Earths which sent them spiralling into the Sun, and ferrying icy building blocks into the terrestrial region of the Solar System which provided the building blocks for the rocky planets. The two giant planets then drifted out again to their present positions. In the view of Batygin and his colleagues: "The concatenation of chance events required for this delicate choreography suggest that small, Earth-like rocky planets – and perhaps life itself – could be rare throughout the cosmos."

=== A continuously stable orbit ===
Newtonian dynamics can produce chaotic planetary orbits, especially in a system having large planets at high orbital eccentricity. Most planetary systems do not have nearly circular orbits for their planets, which would produce extreme climate swings on those planets.

=== A terrestrial planet of the right size ===
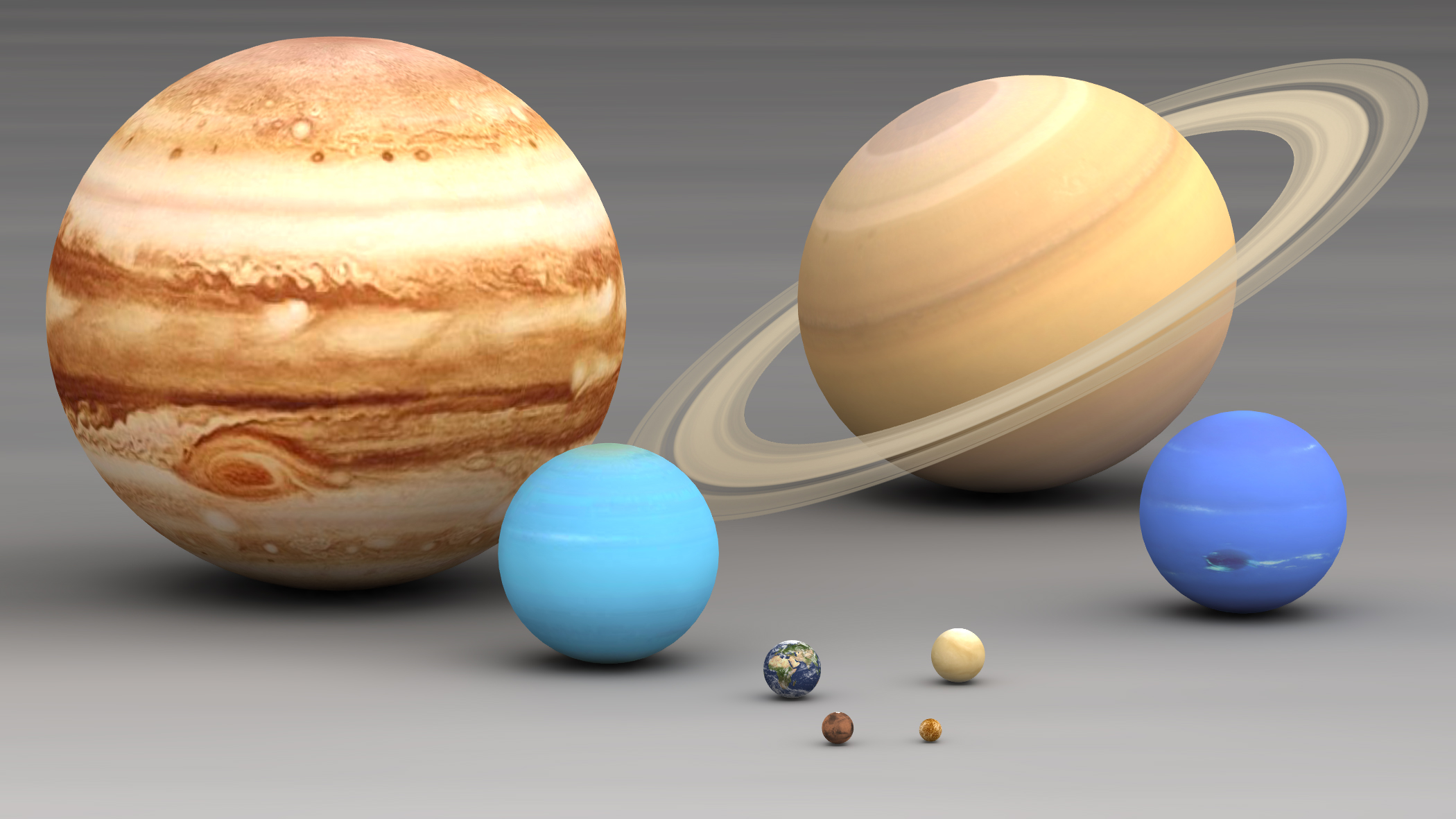
Planets of the Solar System, shown to scale. Rare Earth argues that complex life cannot exist on giant planets such as Jupiter and Neptune or smaller planets such as Mars and Mercury.

The Rare Earth hypothesis argues that life requires terrestrial planets like Earth, and since gas giants lack such a surface, that complex life cannot arise there.

A planet that is too small cannot maintain much atmosphere, rendering its surface temperature low and variable and oceans impossible. A small planet will also tend to have a rough surface, with large mountains and deep canyons. The core will cool faster, and plate tectonics will be brief or entirely absent. On Earth heat loss is balanced by heat production from radioactive decay, resulting in a thin crust and plate tectonics. On a significantly larger planet, heat production would exceed heat loss and Earth would probably not have developed an outer crust, making plate tectonics and life impossible.

=== Plate tectonics ===
The Great American Interchange on Earth, approximately 3.5 to 3 Ma, an example of species competition, resulting from continental plate interaction

An artist's rendering of the structure of Earth's magnetic field-magnetosphere that protects Earth's life from solar radiation. 1) Bow shock. 2) Magnetosheath. 3) Magnetopause. 4) Magnetosphere. 5) Northern tail lobe. 6) Southern tail lobe. 7) Plasmasphere.

Rare Earth proponents argue that plate tectonics and a strong magnetic field are essential for biodiversity, global temperature regulation, and the carbon cycle. The lack of mountain chains elsewhere in the Solar System is evidence that Earth is the only body which now has plate tectonics, and thus the only one capable of supporting life.

Plate tectonics depend on the right chemical composition and a long-lasting source of heat from radioactive decay. Continents must be made of less dense felsic rocks that "float" on underlying denser mafic rock. Taylor emphasizes that tectonic subduction zones require the lubrication of oceans of water. Plate tectonics also provide a means of biochemical cycling.

Plate tectonics and, as a result, continental drift and the creation of separate landmasses would create diversified ecosystems and biodiversity, one of the strongest defenses against extinction. An example of species diversification and later competition on Earth's continents is the Great American Interchange. North and Middle America drifted into South America at around 3.5 to 3 Ma. The fauna of South America had already evolved separately for about 30 million years, since Antarctica separated, but, after the merger, many species were wiped out, mainly in South America, by competing North American animals.

=== A large moon ===
Tide pools resulting from the tidal interactions of the Moon are said to have promoted the evolution of complex life.

The Moon is unusual because the other rocky planets in the Solar System either have no satellites (Mercury and Venus), or only relatively tiny satellites which are most likely captured asteroids (Mars). After Charon, the Moon is also the largest natural satellite in the Solar System relative to the size of its parent body, being 27% the width of Earth.

In the giant-impact hypothesis, the Moon resulted from the impact of a roughly Mars-sized body, dubbed Theia, with the young Earth. This giant impact also gave the Earth its axial tilt (inclination) and velocity of rotation. Rapid rotation reduces the daily variation in temperature and makes photosynthesis viable. The Rare Earth hypothesis further argues that the axial tilt cannot be too large or too small (relative to the orbital plane). A planet with a large tilt will experience extreme seasonal variations in climate. A planet with little or no tilt will lack the stimulus to evolution that climate variation provides. In this view, the Earth's tilt is "just right". The gravity of a large satellite also stabilizes the planet's tilt; without this effect, the variation in tilt would be chaotic, probably making complex life forms on land impossible.

If the Earth had no Moon, the ocean tides resulting solely from the Sun's gravity would be only half that of the lunar tides. A large satellite gives rise to tidal pools, which may be essential for the formation of complex life, though this is far from certain.

A large satellite also increases the likelihood of plate tectonics through the effect of tidal forces on the planet's crust. The impact that formed the Moon may also have initiated plate tectonics, without which the continental crust would cover the entire planet, leaving no room for oceanic crust. It is possible that the large-scale mantle convection needed to drive plate tectonics could not have emerged if the crust had a uniform composition. Another hypothesis indicates that such a large moon may also contribute to maintaining a planet's magnetic shield by continually acting upon a metallic planetary core as dynamo, thus protecting the surface of the planet from charged particles and cosmic rays, and helping to ensure the atmosphere is not stripped over time by the solar wind.

=== An atmosphere ===
Earth's atmosphere

A terrestrial planet must be the right size, like Earth and Venus, in order to retain an atmosphere. On Earth, once the giant impact of Theia thinned Earth's atmosphere, other events were needed to make the atmosphere capable of sustaining life. The Late Heavy Bombardment reseeded Earth with water lost after the impact of Theia. The development of an ozone layer generated a protective shield against ultraviolet (UV) sunlight. Nitrogen and carbon dioxide are needed in a correct ratio for life to form. Lightning is needed for nitrogen fixation. The gaseous carbon dioxide needed for life comes from sources such as volcanoes and geysers. Carbon dioxide is preferably needed at relatively low levels (currently at approximately 400 ppm on Earth) because at high levels it is poisonous. Precipitation is needed to have a stable water cycle. A proper atmosphere must reduce diurnal temperature variation.

=== One or more evolutionary triggers for complex life ===
This diagram illustrates the twofold cost of sex. If each individual were to contribute to the same number of offspring (two), (a) the sexual population remains the same size each generation, whereas (b) the asexual population doubles in size each generation.

Regardless of whether planets with similar physical attributes to the Earth are rare or not, some argue that life tends not to evolve into anything more complex than simple bacteria without being provoked by rare and specific circumstances. Biochemist Nick Lane argues that simple cells (prokaryotes) emerged soon after Earth's formation, but since almost half the planet's life had passed before they evolved into complex ones (eukaryotes), all of whom share a common ancestor, this event can only have happened once. According to some views, prokaryotes lack the cellular architecture to evolve into eukaryotes because a bacterium expanded up to eukaryotic proportions would have tens of thousands of times less energy available to power its metabolism. Two billion years ago, one simple cell incorporated itself into another, multiplied, and evolved into mitochondria that supplied the vast increase in available energy that enabled the evolution of complex eukaryotic life. If this incorporation occurred only once in four billion years or is otherwise unlikely, then life on most planets remains simple. An alternative view is that the evolution of mitochondria was environmentally triggered, and that mitochondria-containing organisms appeared soon after the first traces of atmospheric oxygen.

The evolution and persistence of sexual reproduction is another mystery in biology. The purpose of sexual reproduction is unclear, as in many organisms it has a 50% cost (fitness disadvantage) in relation to asexual reproduction. Mating types (types of gametes, according to their compatibility) may have arisen as a result of anisogamy (gamete dimorphism), or the male and female sexes may have evolved before anisogamy. It is also unknown why most sexual organisms use a binary mating system, and why some organisms have gamete dimorphism. Charles Darwin was the first to suggest that sexual selection drives speciation; without it, complex life would probably not have evolved.

=== The right time in evolutionary history ===
Timeline of evolution; human writing exists for only 0.000218% of Earth's history.

While life on Earth is regarded to have spawned relatively early in the planet's history, the evolution from multicellular to intelligent organisms took around 800 million years. Civilizations on Earth have existed for about 12,000 years, and radio communication reaching space has existed for little more than 100 years. Relative to the age of the Solar System (~4.57 Ga) this is a short time, in which extreme climatic variations, super volcanoes, and large meteorite impacts were absent. These events would severely harm intelligent life, as well as life in general. For example, the Permian-Triassic mass extinction, caused by widespread and continuous volcanic eruptions in an area the size of Western Europe, led to the extinction of 95% of known species around 251.2 Ma ago. About 65 million years ago, the Chicxulub impact at the Cretaceous–Paleogene boundary (~65.5 Ma) on the Yucatán Peninsula in Mexico led to a mass extinction.

== Rare Earth equation ==
The following discussion is adapted from Cramer. The Rare Earth equation is Ward and Brownlee's riposte to the Drake equation. It calculates $N$, the number of Earth-like planets in the Milky Way having complex life forms, as:

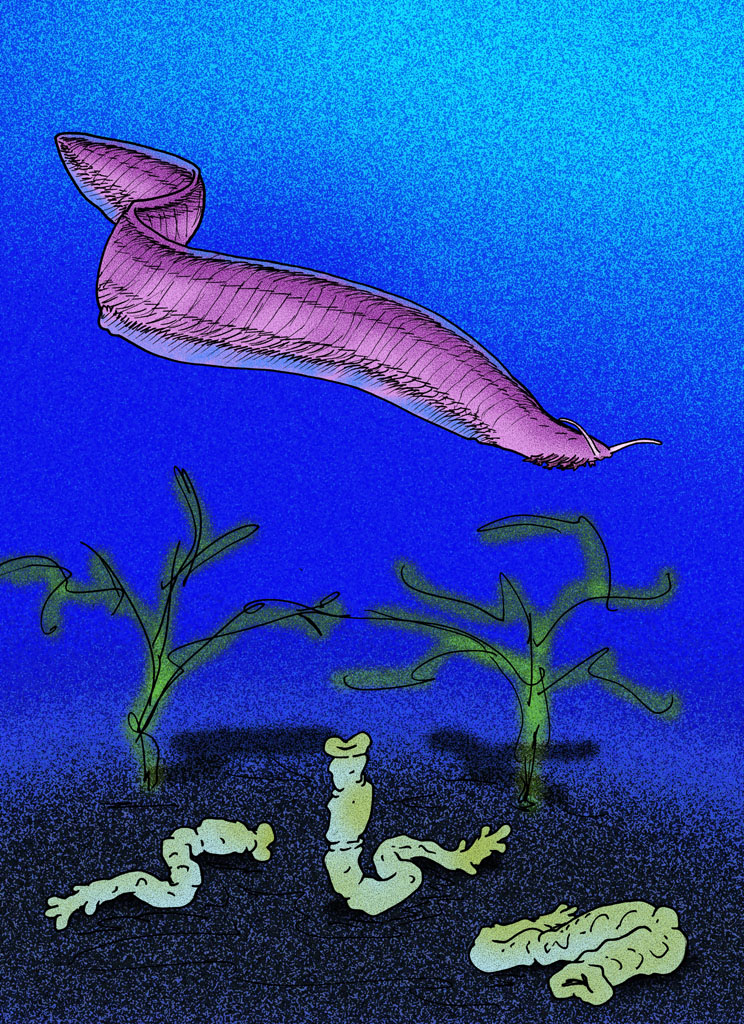
According to Rare Earth, the Cambrian explosion that saw extreme diversification of chordata from simple forms like Pikaia (pictured) was an improbable event.

$N=N^* \cdot n_e \cdot f_g \cdot f_p \cdot f_{pm} \cdot f_i \cdot f_c \cdot f_l \cdot f_m \cdot f_j \cdot f_{me}$

where:

- N* is the number of stars in the Milky Way. This number is not well-estimated, because the Milky Way's mass is not well estimated, with little information about the number of small stars. N* is at least 100 billion, and may be as high as 500 billion, if there are many low visibility stars.
- $n_e$ is the average number of planets in a star's habitable zone. This zone is fairly narrow, being constrained by the requirement that the average planetary temperature be consistent with water remaining liquid throughout the time required for complex life to evolve. Thus, $n_e$=1 is a likely upper bound.

We assume $N^* \cdot n_e=5\cdot10^{11}$. The Rare Earth hypothesis can then be viewed as asserting that the product of the other nine Rare Earth equation factors listed below, which are all fractions, is no greater than 10^{−10} and could plausibly be as small as 10^{−12}. In the latter case, $N$ could be as small as 0 or 1. Ward and Brownlee do not actually calculate the value of $N$, because the numerical values of quite a few of the factors below can only be conjectured. They cannot be estimated simply because we have but one data point: the Earth, a rocky planet orbiting a G2 star in a quiet suburb of a large barred spiral galaxy, and the home of the only intelligent species we know; namely, ourselves.

- $f_g$ is the fraction of stars in the galactic habitable zone (Ward, Brownlee, and Gonzalez estimate this factor as 0.1).
- $f_p$ is the fraction of stars in the Milky Way with planets.
- $f_{pm}$ is the fraction of planets that are rocky ("metallic") rather than gaseous.
- $f_i$ is the fraction of habitable planets where microbial life arises. Ward and Brownlee believe this fraction is unlikely to be small.
- $f_c$ is the fraction of planets where complex life evolves. For 80% of the time since microbial life first appeared on the Earth, there was only bacterial life. Hence Ward and Brownlee argue that this fraction may be small.
- $f_l$ is the fraction of the total lifespan of a planet during which complex life is present. Complex life cannot endure indefinitely, because the energy put out by the sort of star that allows complex life to emerge gradually rises, and the central star eventually becomes a red giant, engulfing all planets in the planetary habitable zone. Also, given enough time, a catastrophic extinction of all complex life becomes ever more likely.
- $f_m$ is the fraction of habitable planets with a large moon. If the giant-impact hypothesis of the Moon's origin is correct, this fraction is small.
- $f_j$ is the fraction of planetary systems with large Jovian planets. This fraction could be large.
- $f_{me}$ is the fraction of planets with a sufficiently low number of extinction events. Ward and Brownlee argue that the low number of such events the Earth has experienced since the Cambrian explosion may be unusual, in which case this fraction would be small.

Lammer, Scherf et al. define Earth-like habitats (EHs) as rocky exoplanets within the habitable zone of complex life (HZCL) on which Earth-like N_{2}-O_{2}-dominated atmospheres with minor amounts of CO_{2} can exist. They estimate the maximum number of EHs in the Milky Way as ${2.54}^{+71.64}_{-2.48}\cdot10^5$, with the actual number of EHs being possibly much less than that. This would reduce the Rare Earth equation to:

$$N_{\max}= {2.54}^{+71.64}_{-2.48}\cdot10^5 \cdot f_i \cdot f_c \cdot f_l \cdot f_m \cdot f_j \cdot f_{me}$$

The Rare Earth equation, unlike the Drake equation, does not factor the probability that complex life evolves into intelligent life that discovers technology. Barrow and Tipler review the consensus among such biologists that the evolutionary path from primitive Cambrian chordates, e.g., Pikaia to Homo sapiens, was a highly improbable event. For example, the large brains of humans have marked adaptive disadvantages, requiring as they do an expensive metabolism, a long gestation period, and a childhood lasting more than 25% of the average total life span. Other improbable features of humans include:

- Being one of a handful of extant bipedal land (non-avian) vertebrate. Combined with an unusual eye–hand coordination, this permits dextrous manipulations of the physical environment with the hands;
- A vocal apparatus far more expressive than that of any other mammal, enabling speech. Speech makes it possible for humans to interact cooperatively, to share knowledge, and to acquire a culture;
- The capability of formulating abstractions to a degree permitting the invention of mathematics, and the discovery of science and technology. Only recently did humans acquire anything like their current scientific and technological sophistication.

== Advocates ==
Writers who support the Rare Earth hypothesis:

- Stuart Ross Taylor, a specialist on the Solar System, firmly believed in the hypothesis. Taylor concluded that the Solar System is probably unusual, because it resulted from so many chance factors and events.
- Stephen Webb, a physicist, mainly presents and rejects candidate solutions for the Fermi paradox. The Rare Earth hypothesis emerges as one of the few solutions left standing by the end of his book Where is Everybody?
- Simon Conway Morris, a paleontologist, endorses the Rare Earth hypothesis in chapter 5 of his Life's Solution: Inevitable Humans in a Lonely Universe, and cites Ward and Brownlee's book with approval.
- John D. Barrow and Frank J. Tipler, cosmologists, vigorously defend the hypothesis that humans are likely to be the only intelligent life in the Milky Way, and perhaps the entire universe. But this hypothesis is not central to their book The Anthropic Cosmological Principle, a thorough study of the anthropic principle and of how the laws of physics are peculiarly suited to enable the emergence of complexity in nature.
- Ray Kurzweil, a computer pioneer and self-proclaimed Singularitarian, argues in his 2005 book The Singularity Is Near that the coming Singularity requires that Earth be the first planet on which sapient, technology-using life evolved. Although other Earth-like planets could exist, Earth must be the most evolutionarily advanced, because otherwise we would have seen evidence that another culture had experienced the Singularity and expanded to harness the full computational capacity of the physical universe.
- John Gribbin, a prolific science writer, defends the hypothesis in Alone in the Universe: Why our planet is unique (2011).
- Marc J. Defant, professor of geochemistry and volcanology, elaborated on several aspects of the rare Earth hypothesis in his TEDx talk entitled: Why We are Alone in the Galaxy. He also wrote in his book in 1998: "I do not believe that we were the destined outcome of evolution. In fact, we are probably the result of an incredible number of chance circumstances (one example is the meteorite impact at the end of the Cretaceous which probably destroyed the dinosaurs and led to mammal domination). The coincidental nature of our evolution should be clear from this book. I might even contend that so many "coincidences" had to take place during the history of the universe, that intelligent life on this planet may be the only life in our universe. I do not mean to suggest that we must have been "created." I mean to say that maybe there is not as much chance of finding life in our galaxy or universe as some would have us believe. We may be it."
- Brian Cox, physicist and popular science celebrity confesses his support for the hypothesis in his 2014 BBC production of the Human Universe.
- Richard Dawkins, evolutionary biologist, notes the Fermi paradox in his book, The Greatest Show on Earth, while discussing how life first evolved on Earth. Although we do not yet know the precise process for how life first began on Earth, Dawkins's view is that it is a rare event given we have not encountered any evidence for life existing elsewhere in the universe. He concludes that life is probably very rare throughout the universe.

== Criticism ==
Cases against the Rare Earth hypothesis take various forms.

=== The hypothesis appears anthropocentric ===
The hypothesis concludes, more or less, that complex life is rare because it can evolve only on the surface of an Earth-like planet or on a suitable satellite of a planet. Some biologists, such as Jack Cohen, believe this assumption too restrictive and unimaginative; they see it as a form of circular reasoning.

According to David Darling, the Rare Earth hypothesis is neither hypothesis nor prediction, but merely a description of how life arose on Earth. In his view, Ward and Brownlee have done nothing more than select the factors that best suit their case.

What matters is not whether there's anything unusual about the Earth; there's going to be something idiosyncratic about every planet in space. What matters is whether any of Earth's circumstances are not only unusual but also essential for complex life. So far we've seen nothing to suggest there is.

Critics also argue that there is a link between the Rare Earth hypothesis and the unscientific idea of intelligent design.

=== Exoplanets around main sequence stars are being discovered in large numbers ===
An increasing number of extrasolar planet discoveries are being made, with 6,534 planets in 4,908 planetary systems known as of 8 October 2026. Rare Earth proponents argue life cannot arise outside Sun-like systems, due to tidal locking and ionizing radiation outside the F7–K1 range. However, some exobiologists have suggested that stars outside this range may give rise to life under the right circumstances; this possibility is a central point of contention to the hypothesis because these late-K and M category stars make up about 82% of all hydrogen-burning stars.

Current technology limits the testing of important Rare Earth criteria: surface water, tectonic plates, a large moon and biosignatures are currently undetectable. Though planets the size of Earth are difficult to detect and classify, scientists now think that rocky planets are common around Sun-like stars. The Earth Similarity Index (ESI) of mass, radius and temperature provides a means of measurement, but falls short of the full Rare Earth criteria.

=== Rocky planets orbiting within habitable zones may not be rare ===
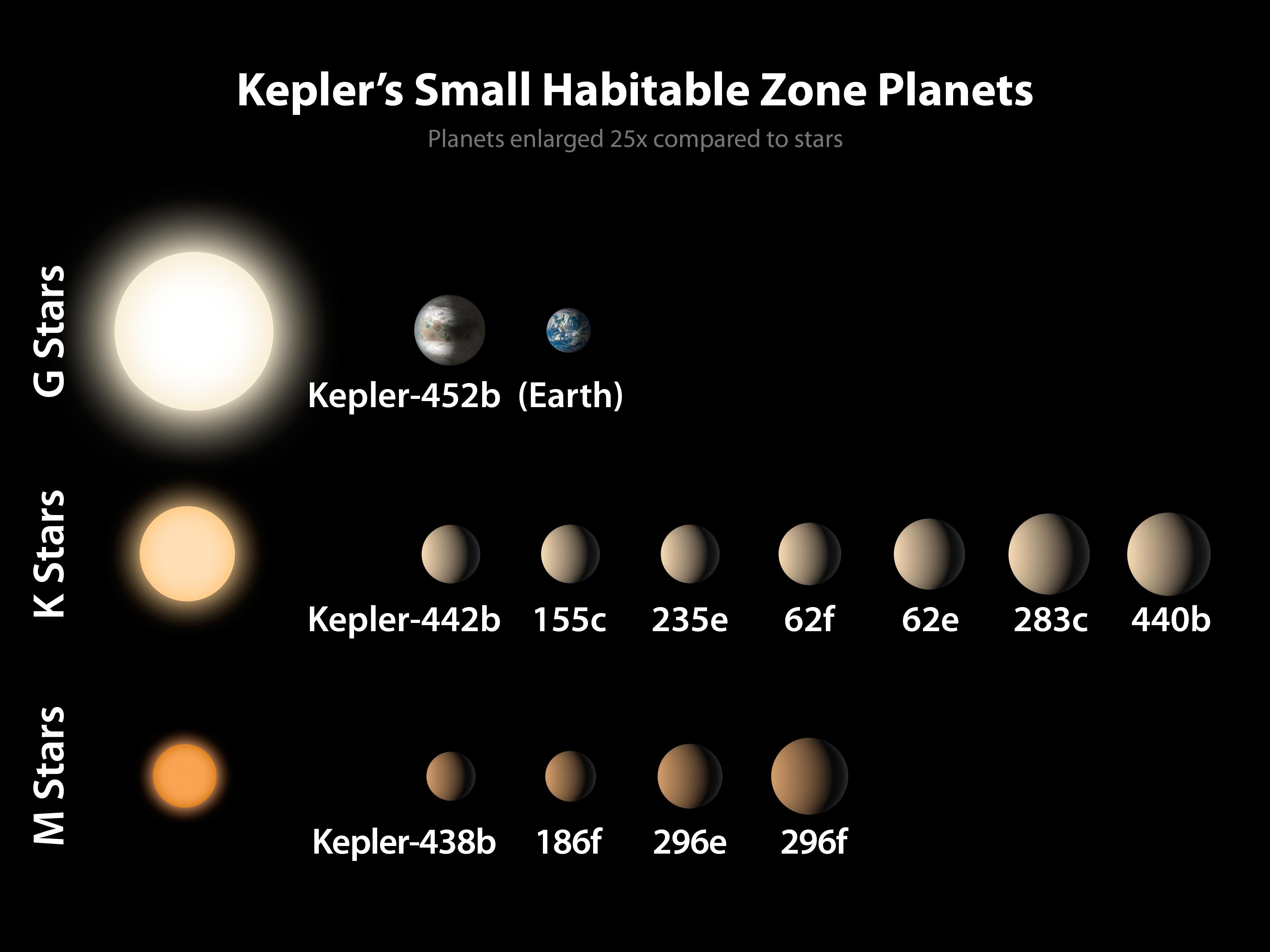
Planets similar to Earth in size are being found in relatively large number in the habitable zones of similar stars. The 2015 infographic depicts Kepler-62e, Kepler-62f, Kepler-186f, Kepler-296e, Kepler-296f, Kepler-438b, Kepler-440b, Kepler-442b, Kepler-452b.

Some argue that Rare Earth's estimates of rocky planets in habitable zones ($n_e$ in the Rare Earth equation) are too restrictive. James Kasting cites the Titius–Bode law to contend that it is a misnomer to describe habitable zones as narrow when there is a 50% chance of at least one planet orbiting within one. In 2013, astronomers using the Kepler space telescope's data estimated that about one-fifth of G-type and K-type stars (sun-like stars and orange dwarfs) are expected to have an Earth-sized or super-Earth-sized planet (1–2 Earths wide) close to an Earth-like orbit (0.25–4 F_{🜨}), yielding about 8.8 billion of them for the entire Milky Way Galaxy.

=== Uncertainty over Jupiter's role ===
The requirement for a system to have a Jovian planet as protector (Rare Earth equation factor $f_j$) has been challenged, affecting the number of proposed extinction events (Rare Earth equation factor $f_{me}$). Kasting's 2001 review of Rare Earth questions whether a Jupiter protector has any bearing on the incidence of complex life. Computer modelling including the 2005 Nice model and 2007 Nice 2 model yield inconclusive results in relation to Jupiter's gravitational influence and impacts on the inner planets. A study by Horner and Jones (2008) using computer simulation found that while the total effect on all orbital bodies within the Solar System is unclear, Jupiter has caused more impacts on Earth than it has prevented. Lexell's Comet, a 1770 near miss that passed closer to Earth than any other comet in recorded history, was known to be caused by the gravitational influence of Jupiter.

=== Plate tectonics may not be unique to Earth or a requirement for complex life ===
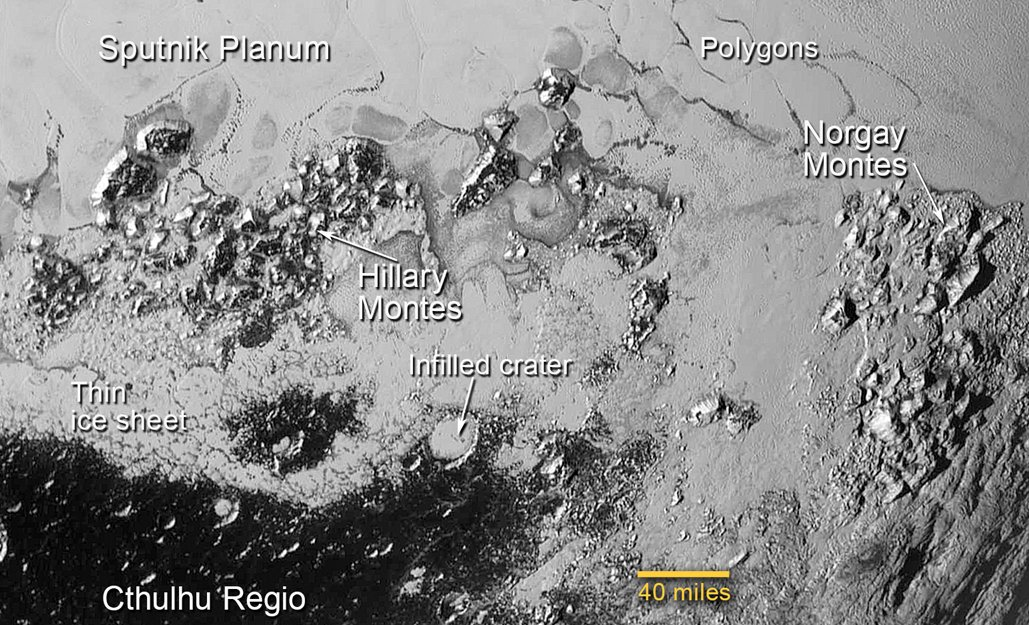
Geological discoveries like the active features of Pluto's Tombaugh Regio appear to contradict the argument that geologically active worlds like Earth are rare.

Ward and Brownlee argue that for complex life to evolve (Rare Earth equation factor $f_c$), tectonics must be present to generate biogeochemical cycles, and predicted that such geological features would not be found outside of Earth, pointing to a lack of observable mountain ranges and subduction. There is, however, no scientific consensus on the evolution of plate tectonics on Earth. Though it is believed that tectonic motion first began around three billion years ago, by this time photosynthesis and oxygenation had already begun. Furthermore, recent studies point to plate tectonics as an episodic planetary phenomenon, and that life may evolve during periods of "stagnant-lid" rather than plate tectonic states.

Recent evidence also points to similar activity either having occurred or continuing to occur elsewhere. The geology of Pluto, for example, described by Ward and Brownlee as "without mountains or volcanoes ... devoid of volcanic activity", has since been found to be quite the contrary, with a geologically active surface possessing organic molecules and mountain ranges like Tenzing Montes and Hillary Montes comparable in relative size to those of Earth, and observations suggest the involvement of endogenic processes. Plate tectonics has been suggested as a hypothesis for the Martian dichotomy, and in 2012 geologist An Yin put forward evidence for active plate tectonics on Mars. Europa has long been suspected to have plate tectonics and in 2014 NASA announced evidence of active subduction. Like Europa, analysis of the surface of Jupiter's largest moon Ganymede strike-strip faulting and surface materials of possible endogenic origin suggests that plate tectonics has also taken place there. In 2017, scientists studying the geology of Charon confirmed that icy plate tectonics also operated on Pluto's largest moon. Since 2017 several studies of the geodynamics of Venus have also found that, contrary to the view that the lithosphere of Venus is static, it is actually being deformed via active processes similar to plate tectonics, though with less subduction, implying that geodynamics are not a rare occurrence in Earth sized bodies.

Kasting suggests that there is nothing unusual about the occurrence of plate tectonics in large rocky planets and liquid water on the surface as most should generate internal heat even without the assistance of radioactive elements. Studies by Valencia and Cowan suggest that plate tectonics may be inevitable for terrestrial planets Earth-sized or larger, that is, Super-Earths, which are now known to be more common in planetary systems.

=== Free oxygen may be neither rare nor a prerequisite for multicellular life ===
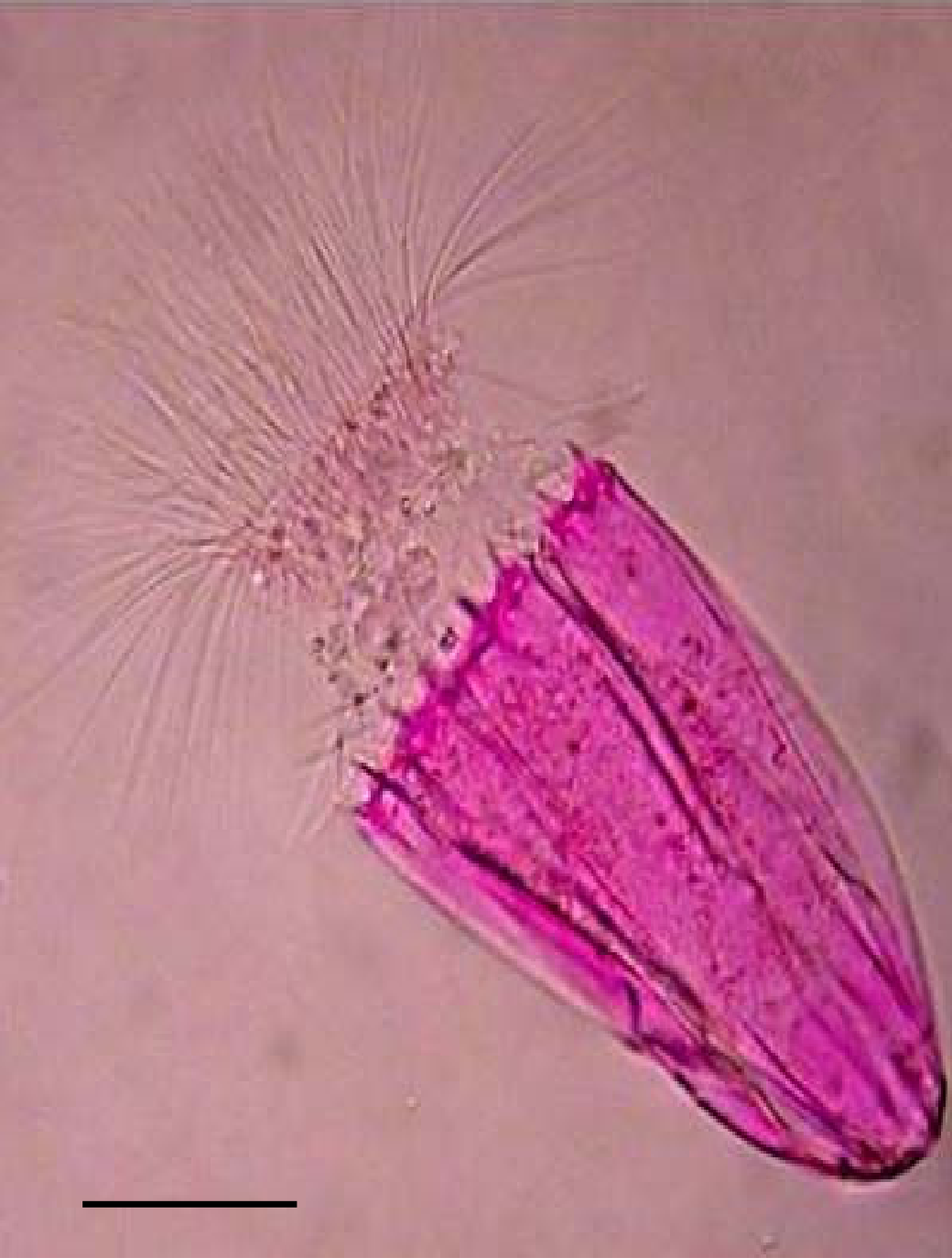
Animals in the genus Spinoloricus are thought to defy the paradigm that all animal life on Earth need oxygen.

The hypothesis that molecular oxygen, necessary for animal life, is rare and that a Great Oxygenation Event (Rare Earth equation factor $f_c$) could only have been triggered and sustained by tectonics, appears to have been invalidated by more recent discoveries.

Ward and Brownlee ask "whether oxygenation, and hence the rise of animals, would ever have occurred on a world where there were no continents to erode". Extraterrestrial free oxygen has recently been detected around other solid objects, including Mercury, Venus, Mars, Jupiter's four Galilean moons, Saturn's moons Enceladus, Dione and Rhea and even the atmosphere of a comet. This has led scientists to speculate whether processes other than photosynthesis could be capable of generating an environment rich in free oxygen. Wordsworth (2014) concludes that oxygen generated other than through photodissociation may be likely on Earth-like exoplanets, and could actually lead to false positive detections of life. Narita (2015) suggests photocatalysis by titanium dioxide as a geochemical mechanism for producing oxygen atmospheres.

Since Ward & Brownlee's assertion that "there is irrefutable evidence that oxygen is a necessary ingredient for animal life", anaerobic metazoa have been found that indeed do metabolise without oxygen. Spinoloricus cinziae, for example, a species discovered in the hypersaline anoxic L'Atalante basin at the bottom of the Mediterranean Sea in 2010, appears to metabolise with hydrogen, lacking mitochondria and instead using hydrogenosomes. Studies since 2015 of the eukaryotic genus Monocercomonoides that lack mitochondrial organelles are also significant as there are no detectable signs that mitochondria are part of the organism. Since then further eukaryotes, particularly parasites, have been identified to be completely absent of mitochondrial genome, such as the 2020 discovery in Henneguya zschokkei. Further investigation into alternative metabolic pathways used by these organisms appear to present further problems for the premise.

Stevenson (2015) has proposed other membrane alternatives for complex life in worlds without oxygen. In 2017, scientists from the NASA Astrobiology Institute discovered the necessary chemical preconditions for the formation of azotosomes on Saturn's moon Titan, a world that lacks atmospheric oxygen. Independent studies by Schirrmeister and by Mills concluded that Earth's multicellular life existed prior to the Great Oxygenation Event, not as a consequence of it.

NASA scientists Hartman and McKay argue that plate tectonics may in fact slow the rise of oxygenation (and thus stymie complex life rather than promote it). Computer modelling by Tilman Spohn in 2014 found that plate tectonics on Earth may have arisen from the effects of complex life's emergence, rather than the other way around as the Rare Earth might suggest. The action of lichens on rock may have contributed to the formation of subduction zones in the presence of water. Kasting argues that if oxygenation caused the Cambrian explosion then any planet with oxygen producing photosynthesis should have complex life.

=== A magnetosphere may not be rare or a requirement ===
The importance of Earth's magnetic field to the development of complex life has been disputed. The origin of Earth's magnetic field remains a mystery though the presence of a magnetosphere appears to be relatively common for larger planetary mass objects as all Solar System planets larger than Earth possess one. There is increasing evidence of present or past magnetic activity in terrestrial bodies such as the Moon, Ganymede, Mercury and Mars. Without sufficient measurement present studies rely heavily on modelling methods developed in 2006 by Olson & Christensen to predict field strength. Using a sample of 496 planets such models predict Kepler-186f to be one of few of Earth size that would support a magnetosphere (though such a field around this planet has not currently been confirmed). However current recent empirical evidence points to the occurrence of much larger and more powerful fields than those found in the Solar System, some of which cannot be explained by these models.

Kasting argues that the atmosphere provides sufficient protection against cosmic rays even during times of magnetic pole reversal and atmosphere loss by sputtering. Kasting also dismisses the role of the magnetic field in the evolution of eukaryotes, citing the age of the oldest known magnetofossils.

=== A large moon may be neither rare nor necessary ===
The requirement of a large moon (Rare Earth equation factor $f_m$) has also been challenged. Even if it were required, such an occurrence may not be as unique as predicted by the Rare Earth Hypothesis. Work by Edward Belbruno and J. Richard Gott of Princeton University suggests that giant impactors such as those that may have formed the Moon can indeed form in planetary trojan points (L_{4} or L_{5} Lagrangian point) which means that similar circumstances may occur in other planetary systems.

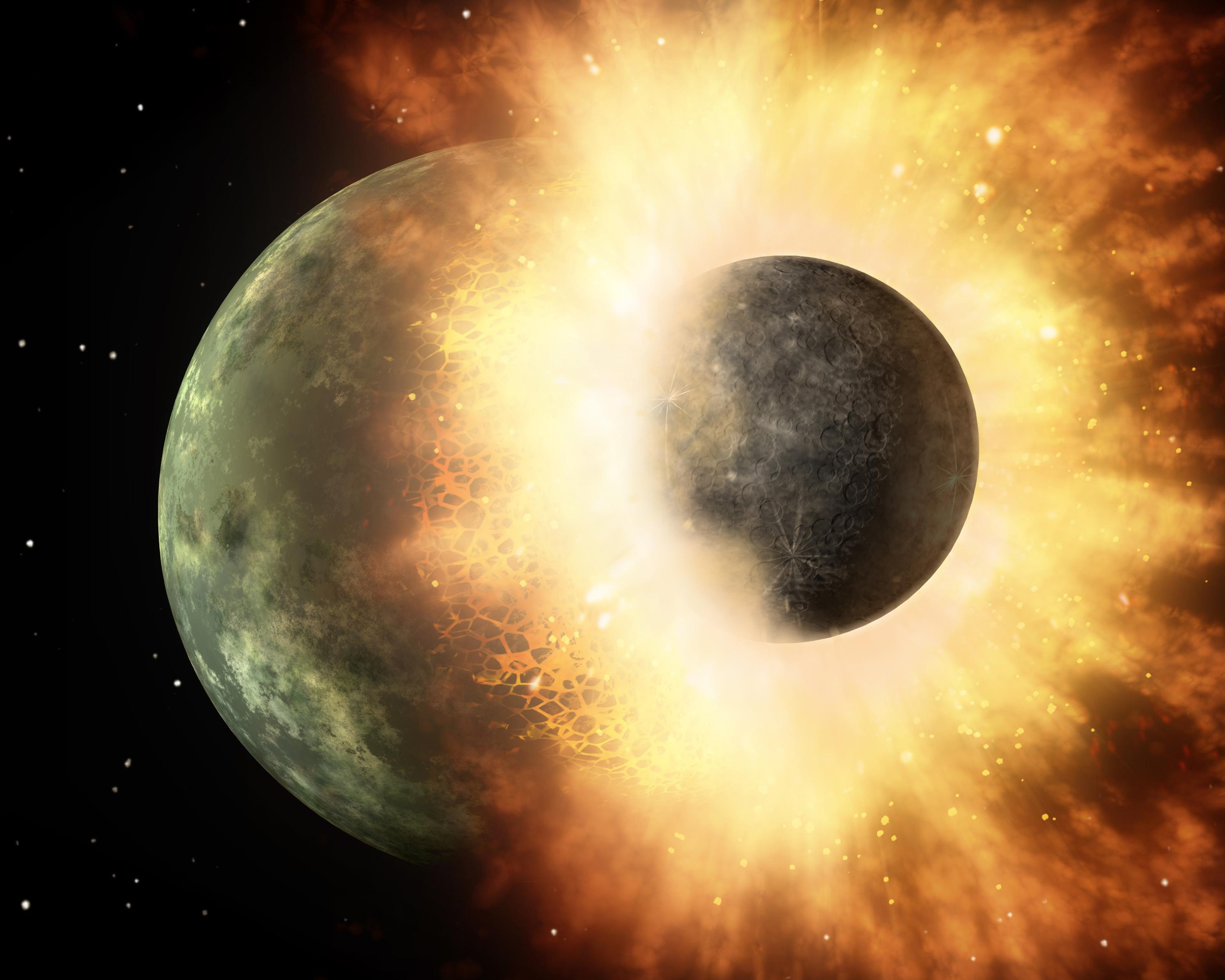
Collision between two planetary bodies (artist concept)

The assertion that the Moon's stabilization of Earth's obliquity and spin is a requirement for complex life has been questioned. Kasting argues that a moonless Earth would still possess habitats with climates suitable for complex life and questions whether the spin rate of a moonless Earth can be predicted. Although the giant-impact hypothesis posits that the impact forming the Moon increased Earth's rotational speed to make a day about 5 hours long, the Moon has slowly "stolen" much of this speed to reduce Earth's solar day since then to about 24 hours and continues to do so: in 100 million years Earth's solar day will be roughly 24 hours 38 minutes (the same as Mars's solar day); in 1 billion years, 30 hours 23 minutes. Larger secondary bodies would exert proportionally larger tidal forces that would in turn decelerate their primaries faster and potentially increase the solar day of a planet in all other respects like Earth to over 120 hours within a few billion years. This long solar day would make effective heat dissipation for organisms in the tropics and subtropics extremely difficult in a similar manner to tidal locking to a red dwarf star. Short days (high rotation speed) cause high wind speeds at ground level. Long days (slow rotation speed) cause the day and night temperatures to be too extreme.

Many Rare Earth proponents argue that the Earth's plate tectonics would probably not exist if not for the tidal forces of the Moon or the impact of Theia (prolonging mantle effects). The hypothesis that the Moon's tidal influence initiated or sustained Earth's plate tectonics remains unproven, though at least one study implies a temporal correlation to the formation of the Moon. Evidence for the past existence of plate tectonics on planets like Mars which may never have had a large moon would counter this argument, although plate tectonics may fade anyway before a moon is relevant to life. Kasting argues that a large moon is not required to initiate plate tectonics.

=== Complex life may arise in alternative habitats ===
Rare Earth proponents argue that simple life may be common, though complex life requires specific environmental conditions to arise. Critics consider life could arise on a moon of a gas giant, though this is less likely if life requires volcanicity. The moon must have stresses to induce tidal heating, but not so dramatic as seen on Jupiter's Io. However, the moon is within the gas giant's intense radiation belts, sterilizing any biodiversity before it can get established. Dirk Schulze-Makuch disputes this, hypothesizing alternative biochemistries for alien life. While Rare Earth proponents argue that only microbial extremophiles could exist in subsurface habitats beyond Earth, some argue that complex life can also arise in these environments. Examples of extremophile animals such as the Hesiocaeca methanicola, an animal that inhabits ocean floor methane clathrates substances more commonly found in the outer Solar System, the tardigrades which can survive in the vacuum of space or Halicephalobus mephisto which exists in crushing pressure, scorching temperatures and extremely low oxygen levels 3.6 kilometres ( 2.2 miles) deep in the Earth's crust, are sometimes cited by critics as complex life capable of thriving in "alien" environments. Jill Tarter counters the classic counterargument that these species adapted to these environments rather than arose in them, by suggesting that we cannot assume conditions for life to emerge which are not actually known. There are suggestions that complex life could arise in sub-surface conditions which may be similar to those where life may have arisen on Earth, such as the tidally heated subsurfaces of Europa or Enceladus. Ancient circumvental ecosystems such as these support complex life on Earth such as Riftia pachyptila that exist completely independent of the surface biosphere.

== See also ==
- Fine-tuned universe - the hypothesis that life could not exist if several, mostly cosmologic natural constants had been even slightly different

== Sources ==
- Barrow, John D.; Tipler, Frank J. (1986). The Anthropic Cosmological Principle. Oxford University Press. ISBN 978-0-19-282147-8.
- Batygin, Konstantin; Laughlin, Gregory; Morbidelli, Alexandro (May 2016). "Born of Chaos". Scientific American. 314 (5): 22–29. Bibcode:2016SciAm.314e..28B. doi:10.1038/scientificamerican0516-28. PMID 27100251.
- Bjornerud, Marcia (2006). Reading the Rocks: The Autobiography of the Earth. New York, NY: Basic Books. ISBN 978-0-465-00684-7.
- Cohen, Jack; Stewart, Ian (2002). Evolving the Alien: The Science of Extraterrestrial Life. Ebury Press. ISBN 978-0-09-187927-3.
- Comins, Neil F. (1993). What If the Moon Didn't Exist? Voyages to Earths that might have been. HarperCollins.
- Conway Morris, Simon (2003). Life's Solution: Inevitable Humans in a Lonely Universe. Cambridge University Press. ISBN 0-521-82704-3.
- Cramer, John G. (September 2000). "The 'Rare Earth' Hypothesis". Analog Science Fiction & Fact Magazine.
- Darling, David (2001). Life Everywhere: The Maverick Science of Astrobiology. Basic Books/Perseus. ISBN 978-0-585-41822-3.
- Dartnell, Lewis (2007). Life in the Universe, a Beginner's Guide. Oxford: One World.
- Gonzalez, Guillermo; Brownlee, Donald; Ward, Peter (July 2001). "The Galactic Habitable Zone: Galactic Chemical Evolution". Icarus. 152 (1): 185–200. arXiv:astro-ph/0103165. Bibcode:2001Icar..152..185G. doi:10.1006/icar.2001.6617. S2CID 18179704.
- Gribbin, John (2011). Alone in the Universe: Why our planet is unique. Wiley.
- Kasting, James (2001). "Peter Ward and Donald Brownlee's "Rare Earth"". Perspectives in Biology and Medicine. 44 (1): 117–131. doi:10.1353/pbm.2001.0008. S2CID 72900092.
- Lane, Nick (28 June 2012). "Life: is it inevitable or just a fluke?". New Scientist. 214 (2870): 32–37. doi:10.1016/S0262-4079(12)61633-9.
- Lineweaver, Charles H.; Fenner, Yeshe; Gibson, Brad K. (2004). "The Galactic Habitable Zone and the Age Distribution of Complex Life in the Milky Way" (PDF). Science. 303 (5654): 59–62. arXiv:astro-ph/0401024. Bibcode:2004Sci...303...59L. doi:10.1126/science.1092322. PMID 14704421. S2CID 18140737. Archived from the original (PDF) on 12 July 2006.
- Lissauer, J.J. (December 1999). "How common are habitable planets?". Nature. 402 (6761 Suppl): C11–4. doi:10.1038/35011503. hdl:2060/20000115621. PMID 10591221. S2CID 13833856.
- Scharf, Caleb (17 July 2012). "How Black Holes Shape the Galaxies, Stars and Planets around Them". Scientific American. 307 (2): 34–9. doi:10.1038/scientificamerican0812-34. PMID 22844849.
- Taylor, Stuart Ross (1998). Destiny or Chance: Our Solar System and Its Place in the Cosmos. Cambridge University Press.
- Ward, Peter D.; Brownlee, Donald (2000). Rare Earth: Why Complex Life is Uncommon in the Universe. Copernicus Books (Springer Verlag). ISBN 978-0-387-98701-9.
- Webb, Stephen (2002). Where is Everybody? (If the universe is teeming with aliens, Where is Everybody?: Fifty solutions to the Fermi paradox and the problem of extraterrestrial life). Copernicus Books (Springer Verlag).
