= Future Evolution =

2001 book by Peter Ward

- Cover of the first edition
- Author: Peter Ward
- Language: English
- Publisher: Holt, Rinehart and Winston
- Publication date: 2001
- Media type: Print
- ISBN: 0-7167-3496-6
- OCLC: 47142211
- Dewey Decimal: 576.8 21
- LC Class: QH366.2 .W37 2001

Future Evolution is a book written by paleontologist Peter Ward and illustrated by Alexis Rockman. He addresses his own opinion of future evolution and compares it with Dougal Dixon's After Man: A Zoology of the Future and H. G. Wells's The Time Machine.

== History of book ==
According to Ward, humanity may exist for a long time. Nevertheless, we are impacting our planet. He splits his book in different chronologies, starting with the near future (the next 1,000 years). Humanity would be struggling to support a massive population of 11 billion. Global warming raises sea levels. The ozone layer weakens. Most of the available land is devoted to agriculture due to the demand for food. Despite all this, the oceanic wildlife remains untethered by most of these impacts, specifically the commercial farmed fish. This is, according to Ward, an era of extinction that would last about 10 million years (note that many human-caused extinctions have already occurred). After that, Earth gets stranger.

Ward labels the species that have the potential to survive in a human-infested world. These include dandelions, raccoons, owls, pigs, cattle, rats, snakes, and crows to name but a few. In the human-infested ecosystem, those preadapted to live amongst man survived and prospered. Ward describes garbage dumps 10 million years in the future infested with multiple species of rats, a snake with a sticky frog-like tongue to snap up rodents, and pigs with snouts specialized for rooting through garbage. The story's time traveller who views this new refuse-covered habitat is gruesomely attacked by ravenous flesh-eating crows.

Ward then questions the potential for humanity to evolve into a new species. According to him, this is incredibly unlikely. For this to happen a human population must isolate itself and interbreed until it becomes a new species. Then he questions if humanity would survive or extinguish itself by climate change, nuclear war, disease, or the posing threat of nanotechnology as terrorist weapons. Ward ultimately concludes that humanity may last for hundreds of millions of years, overcoming every obstacle.

In the final chapter, Ward looks at how life on Earth will fare in the very distant future (500 million years in the future), where an ever-brightening Sun combined with decreasing atmospheric carbon dioxide levels make the Earth too hot for complex life, resulting in the final devolution and eventual extinction of all life on Earth. Ward describes a small beach, with cactus-like plants growing and waist high armoured creatures resembling armadillos. The oceans have become hot and salty, and most marine life having gone extinct. Ward predicts that humans, if any exist at that time, will have to live underground and become the new ants of the Earth, much like the Morlocks from H.G. Wells' novel The Time Machine, knowing that like the remaining plants and animals, they too will become extinct as well.

== See also ==
- Last and First Men, book of Olaf Stapledon
- All Tomorrows, book of C.M Kosemen
- Man After Man, book of Dougal Dixon
- Human evolution
