= Alexis Rockman =

American painter (born 1962)

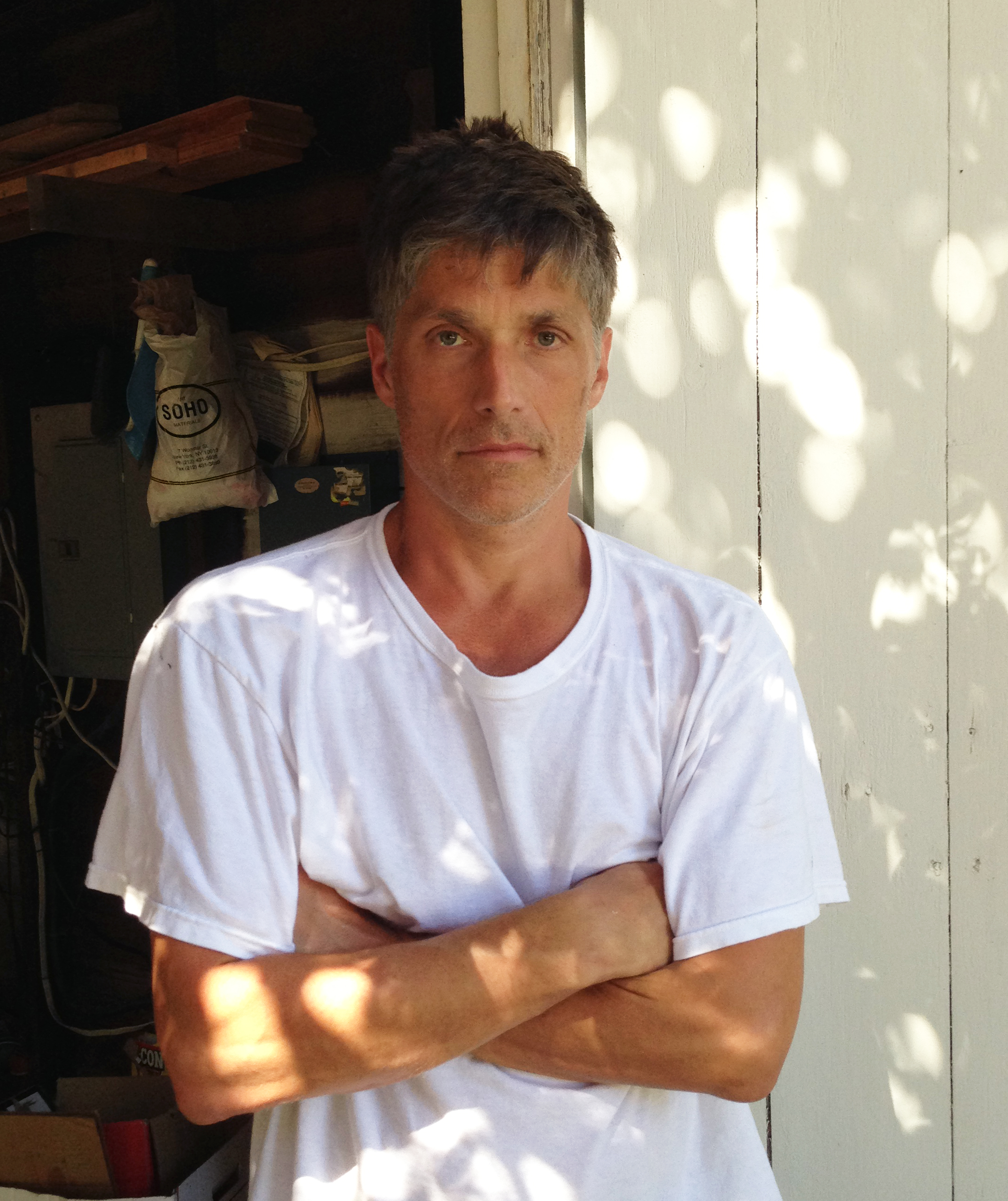
- Rockman in 2013
- Born: 1962 (age 63–64); New York City
- Education: BFA from School of Visual Arts
- Known for: Contemporary artist, landscape painter
- Notable work: Evolution (1992); A Recent History of the World (1999); The Farm (2000); Manifest Destiny (2004)
- Movement: New Gothic Art
- Website: alexisrockman.net

Alexis Rockman (born 1962) is an American contemporary artist known for his paintings that provide depictions of future landscapes as they might exist with impacts of climate change and evolution influenced by genetic engineering. He has exhibited his work in the United States since 1985, including a 2004 exhibition at the Brooklyn Museum, and internationally since 1989. He lives with his wife, Dorothy Spears in Warren, CT and NYC.

== Life ==
Rockman was born and raised in New York City. Rockman's stepfather, Russell Rockman, an Australian jazz musician, brought the family to Australia frequently. As a child, Rockman frequented the American Museum of Natural History in New York City, where his mother, Diana Wall, worked briefly for anthropologist Margaret Mead.

Growing up, Rockman had an interest in natural history and science, and developed fascination for film, animation, and the arts. From 1980 to 1982, Rockman studied animation at the Rhode Island School of Design, and continued studies at the School of Visual Arts in Manhattan, receiving a BFA in fine arts in 1985.

Aside from his art career, Rockman has taken on requests from conservation groups, including the Riverkeeper project and the Rainforest Alliance. He lives with his wife, Dorothy Spears in Warren, CT and NYC.

== Career ==
=== Early career 1985–1993 ===
Rockman began exhibiting his work at the Jay Gorney Modern Art gallery in New York City in 1986 and was represented by the gallery from 1986 to 2005. Rockman also had exhibitions at galleries in Los Angeles, Boston, and Philadelphia in the late 1980s.

Early work was inspired by natural history iconography. In Phylum, Rockman draws upon the work of Ernst Haeckel, an artist and proponent of Darwinism. A series of works by Rockman in the early 1990s, including Barnyard Scene (1990), Jungle Fever (1991), and The Trough (1992), use dark humor in depicting different species mating with one another. In Barnyard Scene, Rockman depicts a raccoon mating with a rooster, and Jungle Fever shows a praying mantis mating with a chipmunk. In 1993, Rockman created Still Life, a still life depiction of a pile of fish and marine specimens, evoking reference to 1935 horror James Whale film Bride of Frankenstein and films by Luis Buñuel. In Still Life, Rockman alludes to the Wunderkammer, placing "aberrant contents" amidst a Baroque still life scene, which traditionally is abundant with wealth and goods from Dutch and Spanish colonies.

In 1992, Rockman painted his first large scale painting, Evolution, which was exhibited at Sperone Westwater Gallery in 1992, the Carnegie Museum of Art and the Venice Biennale in 1993.

The Biosphere series, referencing Douglass Trumbull's seminal 1971 film Silent Running', envisions a situation where the Earth has become too toxic for human life, and the last vestiges of nature are placed in geodesic domes on space ships roaming the outer reaches of the Solar System. Biosphere also references the quasi-scientific experiment Biosphere 2 in Arizona.

=== Second Nature ===
Illinois State University, University Galleries, Normal Illinois, August 17- September 29, 1995.

Curated by Barry Blinderman, this is the first museum survey of Rockman's paintings featuring thirty works ( 18 large scale paintings and 12 smaller works) from 1986 to 1994, with catalog essays by Barry Blinderman, Douglas Blau, Stephen Jay Gould, Prudence Roberts, and Peter Ward. The exhibition traveled to the Portland Art Museum (June 5 - July 23, 1995), Cincinnati Art Museum(Oct. 22 - Dec. 31, 1995), the Tweed Museum of Art (Feb. 6 - March 17, 1996) and The Cranbrook Art Museum (September 20 - October 27, 1996).

=== Travels ===
Many of Alexis Rockman's works have been inspired by his travels around the world, including to Costa Rica, Brazil, Madagascar, Guyana, Tasmania, the Galapagos and Antarctica. Rockman traveled to Guyana in 1994 with fellow artist Mark Dion, resulting in numerous paintings of the flora and fauna that he observed. For the 1994 trip, he strictly painted works that depicted what he saw, with particular interest in various types of insects. Neblina (1995), one of the last works resulting from the Guyana trip, was painted after the collapse of a tailings dam at the Omni gold mine in Guyana, resulting in cyanide leaking into the waterway. Neblina shows wildlife huddled together high in tree branches. Rockman returned to Guyana in 1998, and his works from that trip focused on aspects of ecotourism. Rockman traveled to Antarctica in 2008 with Dorothy Spears, and works resulting from this voyage were featured in the "Badlands: New Horizons in Landscape" exhibit at the Massachusetts Museum of Contemporary Art.

=== Dioramas 1996-97 ===
Dioramas involved a pointed move away from painting: each of the nine works in the exhibition combines paint with collage elements, including photographs, readymade and found objects ( dead animals, etc.), each encases in a block of transparent Envirotex resin between three and a quarter and five inches thick.

=== The Farm, Wonderful World and Future Evolution 1999–2004 ===
The Farm, 2000, oil and acrylic on wood panel. 96 x 120 in.

Rockman's painting The Farm was commissioned by Creative Time and exhibited at the Exit Art Gallery in New York City in 2000, as part of the "Paradise Now: Picturing Genetic Revolution" exhibition. The work depicts domestic and agricultural animals and plants, and how they may appear in the future, as a result of genetic engineering. The work examines how our culture perceives and interacts with plants and animals and the role culture plays in impacting the direction of natural history. In his painting, The Farm, rows of soybean plants extend toward the horizon. "The way I constructed it is that, as in a lot of Western cultures, we read things from left to right.". "On the left side of the image are the ancestral species of the chicken, the pig, the cow, and the mouse"; on the right, their contemporary versions. Farther to the right are "permutations of what things might look like in the future." The choice of a soybean field as his subject is fitting since soybeans are the most common, genetically modified crop. A pig becomes obese with images of a heart, lungs, and liver imposed on its side. A tiny hairless mouse scavenges while a human ear grows out of its back. A rooster sits upon a fence pole, its six wings pressed against its side. For this work, Rockman consulted with molecular biologist Rob DeSalle at the American Museum of Natural History. The Farm led to a residency and a body of work of four other 8x10' paintings called Wonderful World, which was shown at the Camden Art Center in London in 2004.

In Rockman's wonderful world series he describes a possible future of the Pet Store, Sea World, Hot House and Soccer.

Rockman's interest in science lead to a book collaboration with paleontologist and author Peter Douglass Ward Future Evolution, in 2001. Rockman and Ward co-authored the project, with Ward writing the text and Rockman creating the images. Rockman and Ward portray the future as abundant with plants and animals, that are descendants of weedy species or feral domestics.

In 2004, the Monacelli Press publishes an exhaustive monograph with essays by Stephen Jay Gould, Jonathan Crary, David Quammen, and an interview with Dorothy Spears.

=== Manifest Destiny 2004 ===
Manifest Destiny (2004) at the Smithsonian American Art Museum in 2023

In 2004, the Brooklyn Museum featured Manifest Destiny, an 8-by-24-foot oil-on-wood painting by Rockman as a centerpiece for the second-floor Mezzanine Gallery and marking the opening of the renovated Grand Lobby and plaza at the museum. Manifest Destiny imagines the Brooklyn waterfront several hundred years in the future, after climate change has caused catastrophic sea level rise. Rockman sketched out initial ideas for the painting in January 2000, and Brooklyn Museum director Arnold L. Lehman officially requested the painting in 2002. Rockman began work on the mural in March 2003, consulting with experts in various fields, including Peter Ward, James Hansen and Cynthia Rosenzweig and scientists at Columbia University's Goddard Institute for Space Studies, as well as architects Diane Lewis and Chris Morris. Rockman shows the outcome several hundred years in the future, depicting both tropical migrants and invasive plants and animals amidst the ruins of the Brooklyn Bridge, the wrecks of a Dutch sailing ship and a 20th-century submarine, a myriad of failed sea walls and other infrastructure designed to mitigate the rising waters. Rockman's project suggests what the remote geological, botanical, and zoological future might bring, predicting the ecosystem of the area. This painting was exhibited at the Brooklyn Museum (April 17–September 12, 2004), at Grand Arts in Kansas City (14 January – 26 February 2005), at the Addison Gallery of American Art in Andover, MA (12 March – 5 June 2005) at the RISD Museum in Providence, RI(June 17 - September 18, 2005) and was reproduced at scale at the Wexner Center for the Arts ( October 2005 - February 2006). It is now in the collection of the Smithsonian American Art Museum.

=== American Icons (2005-2006) ===
In this series, Rockman imagines some of America's most famous landmarks and monuments as ruins overtaken by the implications of climate change- sea level rise, ravaged by sand and dust storms and invasive plants and animals.

=== Baroque Biology 2007 ===
Cincinnati's Contemporary Arts Center hosted a two-person show with works by Rockman and Tony Matelli in the 2007 exhibition, "Baroque Biology". In Romantic Attachments, Rockman portrays, a male Homo georgicus together with a female human in a romantic encounter. The Homo georgicus dates from 1.8 million years ago, intermediate in the evolutionary timeline between Homo habilis and H. erectus. I Rockman references Gian Lorenzo Bernini's sculpture Ecstasy of Saint Theresa, depicting the torch-bearing male Homo georgicus in place of Bernini's spear-bearing androgynous angel hovering over a female, who in both Bernini's and Rockman's work is portrayed erotically. Sculptor and paleoartist Viktor Deak created two reference models for Rockman of a male Homo georgicus.

=== Smithsonian American Art Museum exhibition ===
In November 2010, the Smithsonian American Art Museum mounted a survey Alexis Rockman: A Fable for Tomorrow, from November 2010 to May 8, 2011, which traveled to Wexner Center for the Arts in Columbus, OH (September 29 - December 30, 2011). The exhibition, presented 47 paintings by Rockman. The title of the exhibition refers to the title of the first chapter of Rachel Carson's book Silent Spring.

=== Rubicon (2012-2014) ===
A series of oil paintings and watercolors depicting an apocalyptic, post- human New York City, Rockman shows that human disasters, though often tragic, occasionally offer opportunities for other creatures. Imagining a post human cityscape where the dark past, present and future ecologies collapse, the Bronx Zoo, the New York City sewer system, Newtown Creek and the Gowanus Canal reveal their cryptic secrets.

=== Life of Pi ===
in 2005, Ang Lee asked Rockman to be an "Inspirational Artist" in his adaptation of Life of Pi.(2012) Over the course of three years, he completed several dozen watercolor concept paintings and developed, with associate producer Jean Castelli, the "Tiger Vision" sequence. Rockman's watercolors for the Life of Pi "served as the backbone for much of the film’s aesthetic."

=== Battle Royale 2011 ===
Battle Royale was executed for the international show Prospect 2 and conceived specifically for the city of New Orleans. The painting depicts fifty-four native and invasive species fighting for dominance in a Louisiana swamp. Non-native plants and animals are placing increasing stress on the state's ecosystems, and the warfare Rockman depicts is quietly taking place all over the state. It is in the permanent collection of the New Orleans Museum of Art.

=== Works on Paper: Watercolors and Weather Drawings ===
From his earliest watercolors in the 1980s, often of hybrid and mutated animals, the ominously beautiful and apocalyptic oil on paper Weather Drawings, painterly works on paper relating to his epic The Great Lakes Cycle, Rockman's works on paper have been ongoing. The artist's graphic work is as critical to the understanding of a visionary oeuvre made at the intersection of art, nature and science as his paintings.

=== Field Drawings ===
Rockman's Field Drawings, which first started in Guyana in 1994, have led him around the world from New Mexico, Tasmania, La Brea Tar Pits, Madagascar, Central Park, Antarctica and The Great Lakes. These drawings are not created on site, but are of the site. Over the years, Rockman has collected samples of organic material, sand, leaves, soil as well as less predictable material such as wombat fecal matter or sperm whale spermaceti. Selected species of flora and fauna relating directly to each site are depicted, some long extinct, some on the brink, while others have a bright future as invasive species.

=== Great Lakes Cycle ===
The Great Lakes Cycle is a series of five monumental paintings and six large format watercolors and 28 Field Drawings investigating the past, present and future of these bodies of water. "I wanted to do a sort of populist project about the Great Lakes and how precious they are. And how little we really consider them, in terms of what a valuable resource they have been and how incredibly valuable they will be in the future" Each 6 x 12 foot painting is read from left to right, chronicling geologic time from the past to the present, continuing to visions of the near future. That future might be challenging as the Great Lakes have long been affected by human activity, and the impact of cities, fishing, industry, farming and invasive species is likely to increase. Rockman traveled extensively around the Great Lakes region doing research, collecting source imagery, and learning about important issues affecting the lakes on the ground. The series, curated by Dana Friis Hansen, director of the Grand Rapids Art Museum, has traveled from The Grand Rapids Art museum (January 27 – April 29, 2018), to the Chicago Cultural Center (June 2—October 1, 2018), the Museum of Contemporary Art, Cleveland (October 19, 2018 — January 27, 2019), The Haggerty Museum of Art at Marquette University, Milwaukee (February 8 to May 19, 2019), the Weisman Art Museum at the University of Minnesota, Minneapolis (October 11, 2019 - January 5, 2020) and the Flint Institute of Arts ( June 11 - September 27, 2020). Each painting explores one aspect of the lakes’ history and ecology from the ice age, some 15,000 years ago, to the near future.

=== Film and animation ===
Rockman is fascinated by film and animation, and has admiration for the work of various film designers. Rockman admires the work of Syd Mead, fantasy art and science fiction illustrator Chesley Bonestell, and stop motion animators including Willis O'Brien, Ray Harryhausen, Brothers Quay, Jan Švankmajer and Phil Tippet; and various Eastern European avant-garde filmmakers.

=== Other influences ===
Charles R. Knight has a special place in Rockman's heart, as he almost single-handedly created the genre of reconstructions of extinct ecosystems. Rockman also drew inspiration from Chesley Bonestell's 1950 Collier's magazine illustration Atom Bombing of New York City, which depicts Manhattan amidst destruction and a glowing orange aura of an atomic bomb.

== See also ==
- Climate change art

== Publications ==
- Alexis Rockman: New Mexico Field Drawings. Exhibition catalogue with essay by Lucy R. Lippard. Santa Fe: SITE Santa Fe, 2018. ISBN 0985660260
- Friis-Hansen, Dana. Alexis Rockman: The Great Lakes Cycle. Exhibition catalogue. East Lansing, MI: Michigan State University Press, 2018. ISBN 1611862914
- A Natural History of New York City. Exhibition catalogue. New York: Salon 94, 2016. Essay by Jonathan Lethem.
- Alexis Rockman: East End Field Drawings. Exhibition catalogue. Water Mill, NY: Parrish Art Museum, 2015. Interview by Terrie Sultan. ISBN 0943526752
- Rush, Michael, ed (2008). The Weight of Air. The Rose Art Museum. ISBN 0-9761593-6-8.
- Distel, Matt, ed (2007). Romantic Attachments. Contemporary Arts Center, Cincinnati. ISBN 0-917562-79-8.
- Big Weather, American Icons. Leo Koenig Inc.. 2006.
- Fresh Kills. Gary Tatintsian Gallery Inc.. 2005. (in English & Russian)
- Alexis Rockman. The Monacelli Press. 2004. ISBN 1-58093-118-9.
- Manifest Destiny. Gorney Bravin + Lee / Brooklyn Museum. 2004. ISBN 0-87273-151-0.
- Wonderful World. Camden Arts Centre. 2004. ISBN 1-900470-32-2.
- Mittelbach, Margaret (2005). Carnivorous Nights: On the Trail of the Tasmanian Tiger. Text Publishing. ISBN 978-1-920885-94-6. Rockman's 2004 journeys in Tasmania are recorded in the book Carnivorous Nights, with his accompanying artwork.
- Ward, Peter (2002). Future Evolution. Henry Holt & Co. ISBN 0-7167-3496-6. Rockman did the illustrations for the book Future Evolution, by Peter Douglas Ward.
- Dioramas. Contemporary Arts Museum, Houston. 1997.
- Dion, Mark; Alexis Rockman (1997). Concrete Jungle: A Pop Media Investigation of Death and Survival in Urban Ecosystems. Juno Books. ISBN 0-9651042-2-2.
- Guyana. Twin Palms Publishers. 1996. ISBN 0-944092-41-1.
- Blinderman, Barry, ed. Second Nature. University Galleries of Illinois State University. ISBN 0-945558-23-6.
- Evolution. Sperone Westwater. 1992.
- Blau, Douglas (1992). Alexis Rockman. Jay Gorney Modern Art, New York and Thomas Solomon's Garage.
- Decter, Joshua (1991). Alexis Rockman. John Post Lee Gallery.
