= What If the Moon Didn't Exist =

1993 collection of speculative articles

- Author: Neil F Comins
- Language: English
- Publisher: HarperCollins
- Publication date: 1993
- Publication place: United States
- ISBN: 0-06-016864-1

What if the Moon Didn't Exist is a collection of speculative articles about different versions of Earth, published in book form in 1993. They were originally published in Astronomy magazine.

== Contents ==
The individual scenarios are:

- Solon – Earth without a Moon
- Lunholm – Moon closer to Earth
- Petiel – Earth with less mass
- Urania – Earth's axis tilted like that of Uranus
- Granstar – More massive Sun
- Antar – Effects if a supernova exploded near Earth
- Cerberon – Star passing through the Solar System
- Diablo – Black hole passing through the Earth
- Seeing the world via infrared
- Effects of ozone layer depletion

== Reception ==
Reviews in Publishers Weekly and Kirkus said that the first several stories were interesting, but noted that the conceit grew repetitive.
