= Donald E. Brownlee =

American astronomer (born 1943)

- Born: Donald Eugene Brownlee; December 21, 1943 (age 82); Las Vegas, Nevada, United States
- Education: University of California, Berkeley
- Known for: co-originator of the term Rare Earth
- Awards: J. Lawrence Smith Medal, Leonard Medal, NASA Medal for Exceptional Scientific Achievement
- Scientific career
- Fields: Astrobiology, Astronomy
- Workplaces: University of Washington at Seattle

Donald Eugene Brownlee (born December 21, 1943) is a professor of astronomy at the University of Washington at Seattle and the principal investigator for NASA's Stardust mission. In 2000, along with his co-author Peter Ward, he co-originated the term Rare Earth, in reference to the possible scarcity of life elsewhere in the universe. His primary research interests include astrobiology, comets, and cosmic dust. He was born in Las Vegas, Nevada.

== Education and employment ==
Brownlee studied electrical engineering at University of California, Berkeley, prior to attending graduate school at the University of Washington. Brownlee received his doctorate in astronomy from the University of Washington in 1971, joining the astronomy department as faculty in 1975. He has also conducted research as a distinguished visiting professor at the Enrico Fermi Institute at the University of Chicago. Alongside paleontologist Peter Ward, Brownlee is the coauthor of two books, Rare Earth: Why Complex Life is Uncommon in the Universe (which put forth the Rare Earth Hypothesis) and The Life and Death of Planet Earth, with his third book The Sixth Element: How Carbon Shapes Our World being co-authored with Theodore P. Snow.

== Honors ==
Asteroid 3259 was named after Brownlee in 1991. The International Mineralogical Association has also named a new mineral in honor of Donald Brownlee. This new silicide mineral (with chemical formula MnSi) is now called brownleeite, and is the first mineral found from a comet. He has been awarded the J. Lawrence Smith Medal from the National Academy of Sciences, the Leonard Medal from the Meteoritical Society, and the NASA Medal for Exceptional Scientific Achievement in 2007. He was elected a member of the National Academy of Sciences in 1995 and in 1999 a fellow of the American Geophysical Union.
