= Peter Ward (paleontologist) =

American paleontologist

Peter D. Ward
- Born: Peter Douglas Ward; May 12, 1949 (age 77); Seattle, Washington, U.S.
- Known for: co-originator of the term Rare Earth work on the Cretaceous–Paleogene extinction event
- Scientific career
- Fields: Paleontology

Peter Douglas Ward (born May 12, 1949) is an American paleontologist and professor at the University of Washington, Seattle, and Sprigg Institute of Geobiology at the University of Adelaide. He is also an adviser to the Microbes Mind Forum. In 2000, along with his co-author Donald E. Brownlee, he co-originated the term Rare Earth and developed the Medea hypothesis alleging that multicellular life is ultimately self-destructive.

== Life and work ==
His parents, Joseph and Ruth Ward, moved to Seattle following World War II. Ward grew up in the Seward Park neighborhood of Seattle, attending Franklin High School, and he spent time during summers at a family summer cabin on Orcas Island.

Ward's academic career has included teaching posts and professional connections with Ohio State University, the NASA Astrobiology Institute, the University of California, McMaster University (where he received his Ph.D. in 1976), and the California Institute of Technology. He was elected as a Fellow of the California Academy of Sciences in 1984.

Ward specializes in the Cretaceous–Paleogene extinction event, the Permian–Triassic extinction event, and mass extinctions generally. He has published books on biodiversity and the fossil record. His 1992 book On Methuselah's Trail received a "Golden Trilobite Award" from the Paleontological Society as the best popular science book of the year. Ward also serves as an adjunct professor of zoology and astronomy.

His book The End of Evolution was published in 1994. In it, he discussed in three parts, each about an extinction event on earth. This book was rewritten and published in 2000 as Rivers in Time.

Ward is co-author, along with astronomer Donald Brownlee, of the best-selling Rare Earth: Why Complex Life Is Uncommon in the Universe, published in 2000, thereby co-originating the term Rare Earth. In that work, the authors suggest that the universe is fundamentally hostile to advanced life, and that, while simple life might be abundant, the likelihood of widespread lifeforms as advanced as those on Earth is marginal. In 2001, his book Future Evolution was published, featuring illustrations by artist Alexis Rockman.

Ward and Brownlee are also co-authors of the book The Life and Death of Planet Earth, which discusses the Earth's future and eventual demise as it is ultimately destroyed by a warming and expanding Sun. The book picks up where Rare Earth leaves off, this time talking about how and why the Earth and its ability to support complex and especially intelligent life is actually not just rare in space, but also in time. See also Future of the Earth.

According to Ward's 2007 book, Under a Green Sky: Global Warming, the Mass Extinctions of the Past, and What They Can Tell Us About Our Future, all but one of the major mass extinction events in history have been brought on by climate change. The author argues that events in the past can give valuable information about the future of our planet. Reviewer Doug Brown goes further, stating "this is how the world ends." Scientists at the Universities of York and Leeds also warn that the fossil record supports evidence of impending mass extinction. Recently, Ward has slowly started to shift his interest toward climate change because of his experiences with studying mass extinctions, as well as justifying why intelligent life, including humanity, is especially even rarer than complex life in general in terms of both space and time, as intelligent life only lasts for just a few thousand years before finally collapsing and going extinct, as seen in the book The Flooded Earth: Our Future in a World Without Ice Caps, which documents the effects of ongoing and future man-made climate change. However, in 2014, Ward returned to his roots as a paleontologist with his book A New History of Life, co-authored with Joe Kirschvink, and in his 2018 book, Lamarck's Revenge.

Ward is the father of indie musician and producer Nick Ward of the Seattle band Hey Marseilles.

== Medea hypothesis ==
The Medea hypothesis is a term coined by Ward for a hypothesis that contests the Gaian hypothesis, proposing that multicellular life, understood as a superorganism, is self-destructive or suicidal, allowing a return to simpler life-forms.

== Appearances ==
Peter Ward was featured in the PBS's Evolution series (2001) to discuss the evidence for evolution in the geologic record and has appeared on NOVA scienceNOW. He was also one of the scientists on Animal Planet's Animal Armageddon (2009). Ward is also a guest on Coast to Coast AM, a radio program that mostly specializes on paranormal activity and other unexplained phenomena.

== Selected works ==
=== Books ===
- In Search of Nautilus: Three Centuries of Scientific Adventures in the Deep Pacific to Capture a Prehistoric, Living Fossil (1988) ISBN 978-0-671-61951-0 OCLC 17840660
- On Methuselah's Trail: Living Fossils and the Great Extinctions (1992) ISBN 978-0-7167-2488-9
- The Call of Distant Mammoths: Why the Ice Age Mammals Disappeared (1997) ISBN 978-0-387-98572-5
- Time Machines: Scientific Exploration of Deep Time (1998) ISBN 978-0-387-98416-2
- Rivers in Time: the Search for Clues to Earth's Mass Extinctions (2000) ISBN 978-0-231-11862-0
- Rare Earth: Why Complex Life Is Uncommon in the Universe with Donald Brownlee (2000) ISBN 978-0-387-95289-5
- Future Evolution: An Illuminated History of Life to Come (2001) ISBN 978-0-7167-3496-3
- The Life and Death of Planet Earth: How the New Science of Astrobiology Charts the Ultimate Fate of Our World with Donald Brownlee (2003) ISBN 978-0-8050-7512-0
- Gorgon: Obsession, Paleontology, and the Greatest Catastrophe in Earth's History (2004) ISBN 978-0-670-03094-1
- Life as We Do Not Know It: The NASA Search for (and Synthesis of) Alien Life (2005) ISBN 0-670-03458-4
- Out of Thin Air: Dinosaurs, Birds, and Earth's Ancient Atmosphere (2006) ISBN 0-309-10061-5
- Under a Green Sky: Global Warming, the Mass Extinctions of the Past, and What They Can Tell Us About Our Future (2007) ISBN 978-0-06-113791-4
- The Medea Hypothesis: Is Life on Earth Ultimately Self-Destructive? (2009) ISBN 0-691-13075-2
- The Flooded Earth: Our Future In a World Without Ice Caps (2010) ISBN 978-0-465-00949-7
- A New History of Life: The radical new discoveries about the origins and evolution of life on Earth with Joe Kirschvink (2015) ISBN 978-1608199075
- Lamarck's Revenge: How Epigenetics Is Revolutionizing Our Evolution's Past and Present (2018) ISBN 9781632866172

=== Journal articles ===
- Ward, Peter D.; Hurtado, José M.; Kirschvink, Joseph L.; Verosub, Kenneth L. (12 September 1997). "Measurements of the Cretaceous Paleolatitude of Vancouver Island: Consistent with the Baja-British Columbia Hypothesis". Science. 277 (5332): 1642–1645. doi:10.1126/science.277.5332.1642. ISSN 0036-8075.
- Ward, Peter D.; Montgomery, David R.; Smith, Roger (8 September 2000). "Altered River Morphology in South Africa Related to the Permian-Triassic Extinction". Science. 289 (5485): 1740–1743. Bibcode:2000Sci...289.1740W. doi:10.1126/science.289.5485.1740. ISSN 0036-8075.
- Ward, Peter D.; Botha, Jennifer; Buick, Roger; De Kock, Michiel O.; Erwin, Douglas H.; Garrison, Geoffrey H.; Kirschvink, Joseph L.; Smith, Roger (4 February 2005). "Abrupt and Gradual Extinction Among Late Permian Land Vertebrates in the Karoo Basin, South Africa". Science. 307 (5710): 709–714. Bibcode:2005Sci...307..709W. doi:10.1126/science.1107068. ISSN 0036-8075. PMID 15661973.

== See also ==
- Fermi paradox
- Gorgonopsia
