= The Life and Death of Planet Earth =

2003 book by Peter Ward and Donald E. Brownlee

- Author: Peter Ward; Donald E. Brownlee
- Subject: Popular science
- Publisher: Macmillan Publishers
- Publication date: January 1, 2003
- Publication place: United States
- Pages: 256
- ISBN: 9780805075120
- Website: us.macmillan.com/books/9780805075120/thelifeanddeathofplanetearth

The Life and Death of Planet Earth (full title: The Life and Death of Planet Earth: How the New Science of Astrobiology Charts the Ultimate Fate of Our World) is a popular science book by paleontologist Peter Ward and astronomer Donald E. Brownlee. Released in 2003, the book picks up where Rare Earth leaves off, this time talking about why the Earth's ability to support complex and, especially, intelligent life is not just rare in space, but also in time.

== Summary ==
The book discusses Earth's future and eventual demise as it is ultimately destroyed by a warming and expanding Sun. The Earth's lifespan is compared to that of a living being, pointing out that the systems which keep it habitable will gradually break down one by one, like the organs in an aging human body. The book also illustrates Earth's eventual fate by compressing its full 12 billion-year history into 12 hours on a clock, with the first life appearing at 1:00 am, the first animals and plants appearing at 4:00 am, and the present day being 4:29.59 am. The Earth is destroyed by the Sun at "high noon", though animals and plants come to an end by 5:00 am, meaning that the time that Earth can remain habitable to animals is very short, lasting only just 1 billion years, with the present day being the halfway point through that relatively short time. The book also suggests that not only will Earth eventually become uninhabitable to complex life long before it finally gets destroyed by the Sun's red giant stage, it also implies that intelligent life will probably die out even much sooner due to them being even more fragile than other animals, and that not only microbial life were the first life forms to appear, they will also eventually be the last surviving life forms on Earth to still remain in the distant future before they too finally disappear, and that many alien planets like Earth, even if they could support complex life, and are not as rare as described in the previous book, still have finite lifespans for their ability to support complex life, and therefore will likely not remain habitable very long, if not terminated much sooner by minor catastrophic events.

== Reception ==
David Hughes of New Scientist said it was both riveting and provoked thoughts of doom. Fraser Cain called the book depressing on Universe Today, but said that the authors "tell an engaging story" and that the scientific terminology used is well explained. Publishers Weekly said that the authors do not make an airtight case, though "they do deftly bring together findings from many disparate areas of science in a book that science buffs will find hard to put down". The verdict of Kirkus Reviews was "Far from cheerful, but fascinating", while pointing out that the authors tended to move quickly from fact to their own personal theories, and that the prose was not of the highest standard. The Oxford Mail quipped, "The joy of writing books about the next billion years is that no one will confront you with your mistakes".
