= Geodynamics of terrestrial exoplanets =

Field of study

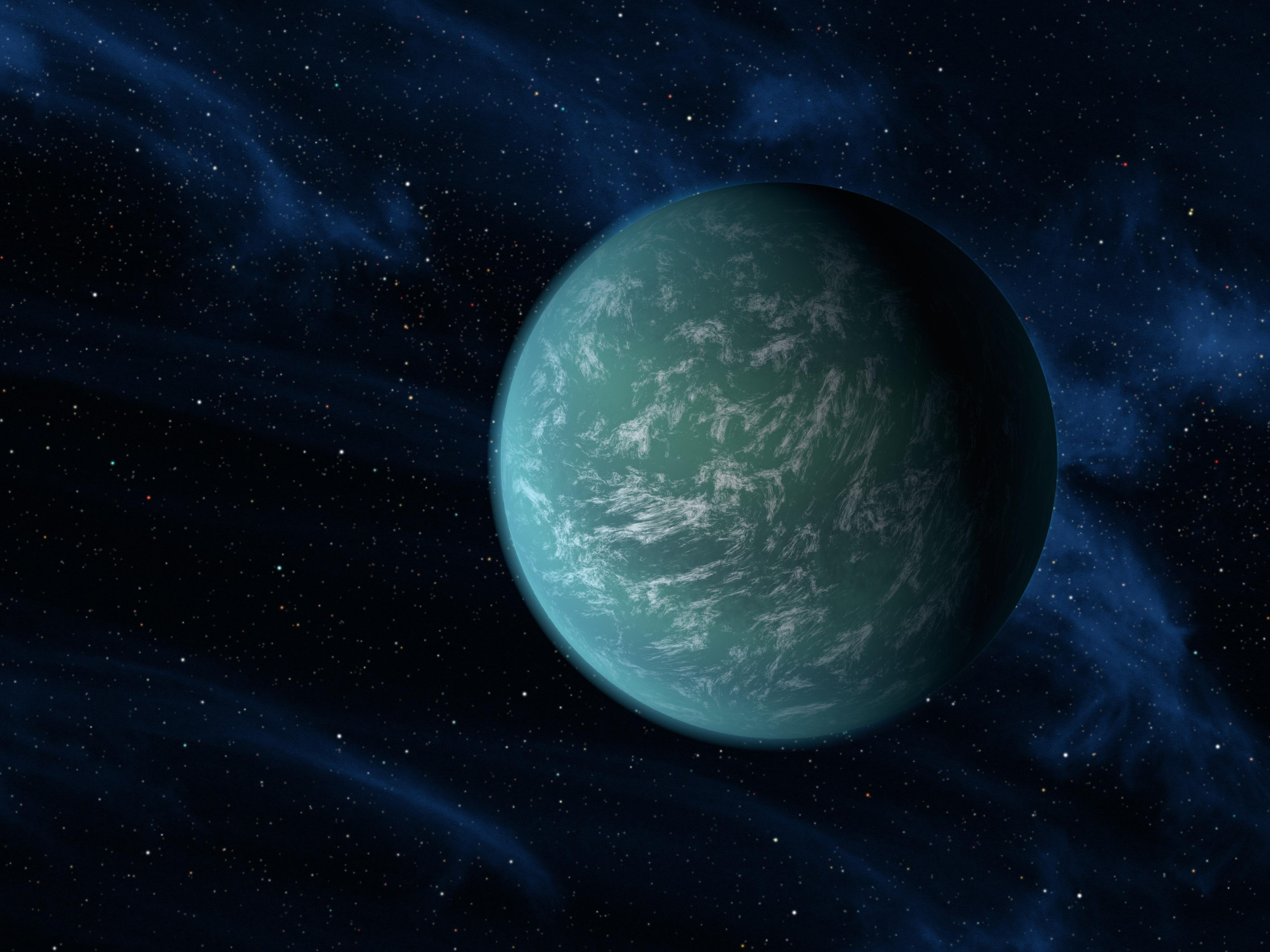
Artistic sketch of Kepler-22b, a recently discovered exoplanet with comparable mass (within 10 Earth masses) of the planet Earth.

The discovery of extrasolar Earth-sized planets has encouraged research into their potential for habitability. One of the generally agreed requirements for a life-sustaining planet is a mobile, fractured lithosphere cyclically recycled into a vigorously convecting mantle, in a process commonly known as plate tectonics. Plate tectonics provide a means of geochemical regulation of atmospheric particulates, as well as removal of carbon from the atmosphere. This prevents a “runaway greenhouse” effect that can result in inhospitable surface temperatures and vaporization of liquid surface water. Planetary scientists have not reached a consensus on whether Earth-like exoplanets have plate tectonics, but it is widely thought that the likelihood of plate tectonics on an Earth-like exoplanet is a function of planetary radius, initial temperature upon coalescence, insolation, and presence or absence of liquid-phase surface water.

== Potential exoplanet geodynamic regimes ==
In order to characterize the geodynamic regime of an Earth-like exoplanet, the basic assumption is made that such a planet is Earth-like or “rocky”. This implies a three-layer stratigraphy of (from center to surface) a partially molten iron core, a silicate mantle that convects over geologic timescales, and a relatively cold, brittle silicate lithosphere. Within these parameters, the geodynamic regime at a given time point in the planet's history is likely to fall within one of three categories:

=== Plate tectonics ===
The mantle of a planet with plate tectonics has driving forces that exceed the yield strength of the brittle lithosphere, causing the lithosphere to fracture into plates that move relative to each other. A critical element of the plate tectonic system is these lithospheric plates become negatively buoyant at some point in their evolution, sinking into the mantle. The surface mass deficit is balanced by new plate being formed elsewhere through upwelling mantle plumes. Plate tectonics is an efficient method of heat transfer from the interior of the planet to the surface. Earth is the only planet plate tectonics is known to occur on, although evidence has been presented for Jupiter's moon Europa undergoing a form of plate tectonics analogous to Earth's.

=== Stagnant lid ===
A stagnant lid regime occurs when mantle driving forces do not exceed the lithospheric yield strength, resulting in a single, continuous rigid plate overlying the mantle. Stagnant lids only develop when the viscosity contrast between the surface and planetary interior exceeds about four orders of magnitude.

=== Episodic tectonics ===
Episodic tectonics is a general term for a geodynamic regime that possesses aspects of both plate tectonics and stagnant lid dynamics. Planets with episodic tectonic regimes will have immobile surface lids for geologically long spans of time, until a shift in equilibrium conditions is precipitated by either weakening lithosphere or increasing mantle driving forces. When this occurs, the shift to plate tectonics is usually catastrophic in nature and can involve resurfacing of the entire planet. After such a resurfacing event (or period of resurfacing events), stagnant lid equilibrium conditions are regained, resulting in a quiescent, immobile lid.

== Methods of predicting exoplanet geodynamic regimes ==
Exoplanets have been directly observed and remotely sensed, but due to their great distance and proximity to obscuring energy sources (the stars they orbit), there is little concrete knowledge of their composition and geodynamic regime. Therefore, the majority of information and conjectures made about them come from alternative sources.

=== Solar System analogues ===
All the rocky planets in the Solar System except Earth are generally believed to be in the stagnant lid geodynamic regime. Mars and particularly Venus have evidence of prior resurfacing events, but appear to be tectonically quiescent today. Geodynamic inferences about Solar System planets have been extrapolated to exoplanets in order to constrain what kind of geodynamic regimes can be expected given a set of physical criterion such as planetary radius, presence of surface water, and insolation. In particular, the planet Venus has been intensely studied due to its general physical similarities to Earth yet completely different geodynamic regime. Proposed explanations include a lack of surface water, the lack of a magnetic geodynamo, or large-scale evacuation of interior heat shortly after planetary coalescence.

Another source of insight within the Solar System is the history of the planet Earth, which may have had several episodes of stagnant lid geodynamics during its history. These stagnant-lid periods were not necessarily planet-wide; when supercontinents such as Gondwanaland existed, their presence may have shut off plate motion over large expanses of the Earth's surface until mantle heat buildup underneath the superplate was sufficient to break them apart.

=== Observation of exoplanets ===
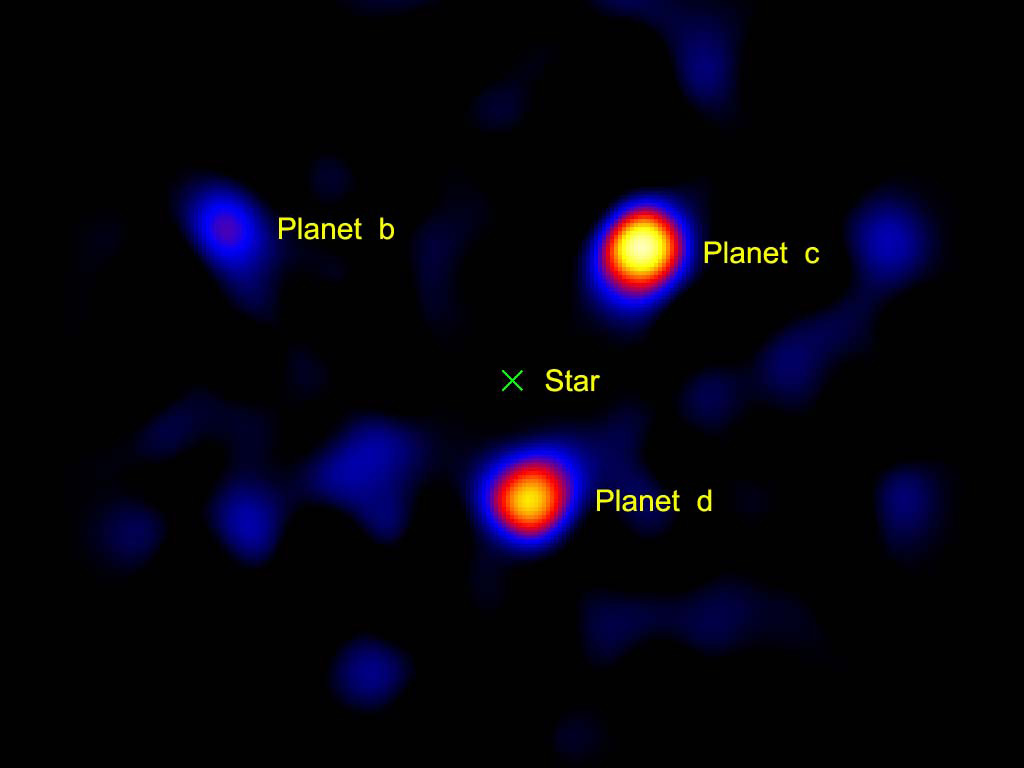
Three identified exoplanets around the roughly sun-sized star HR8799, imaged through a vector vortex coronagraph on a 1.5m section of the Hale Telescope.

Indirect and direct observation methods such as radial velocity and coronagraphs can give envelope estimates of exoplanet parameters such as mass, planetary radius, and orbital radius/eccentricity. Since distance from the host star and planetary size are generally believed to influence exoplanet geodynamic regime, inferences can be drawn from such information. For example, an exoplanet close enough to its host star to be tidally locked may have drastically different "dark" and "light" side temperatures and correspondingly bipolar geodynamic regimes (see insolation section below).

Spectroscopy has been used to characterize extrasolar gas giants, but has not yet been used on rocky exoplanets. However, numerical modeling has demonstrated that spectroscopy could detect atmospheric sulfur dioxide levels as low as 1 ppm; presence of sulfur dioxide at this concentration may be indicative of a planet without surface water and with volcanism 1500–80000 times higher than Earth.

=== Numerical modeling ===
Since real data on exoplanets is currently limited, a large amount of the dialogue regarding rocky exoplanet tectonics has been driven by the results of numerical modeling studies. In such models, different planetary physical parameters are manipulated (i.e. mantle viscosity, core-mantle boundary temperature, insolation, “wetness” or hydration of subducting lithosphere) and the resultant impact on the geodynamic regime is reported. Due to computational limitations the large amount of variables that control planet geodynamics in real life cannot be accounted for; models therefore ignore certain parameters believed to be less important and emphasize others to try to isolate disproportionately important driving factors. Some of these parameters include:

==== Scaling parameters ====
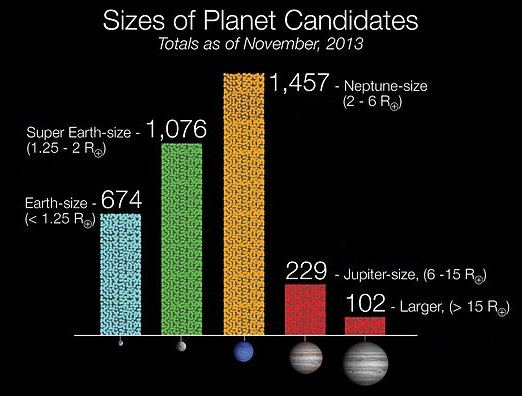
Bar chart showing the size distribution of observed Kepler planet candidates (terrestrial exoplanets in the habitable zone of their host star). Data set is 2,740 planets orbiting 2,036 stars. The Earth-size and Super Earth-size (leftmost) columns represent potential terrestrial exoplanets.

Early models of rocky exoplanets scaled different factors (namely mantle viscosity, lithospheric yield strength, and planetary size) up and down to predict the geodynamic regime of an exoplanet with given parameters. Two scaling studies of exoplanet size published in 2007 came to fundamentally different conclusions: O'Neill and Lenardic (2007) showed that a planet of 1.1 Earth mass would have Earth-like lithospheric yield stress but reduced mantle driving stresses, resulting in a stagnant lid regime. Conversely, Valencia et al. (2007) concluded the increase in mantle velocity (driving force) is large compared to the gravitationally-forced increase of plate viscosity as planets increase beyond one Earth mass, increasing the likelihood of plate tectonics with planet size.

==== Viscoelastic-plastic rheology ====
Most models simulate lithospheric plates with a viscoelastic-plastic rheology. In this simulation, plates deform viscoelastically up to a threshold level of stress, at which point they deform in a plastic manner. The lithospheric yield stress is a function of pressure, stress, composition, but temperature has a disproportionate effect on it. Therefore, changes to the lithospheric temperature, whether from external sources (insolation) or internal (mantle heating) will increase or decrease the likelihood of plate tectonics in viscoelastic-plastic models. Models with different modes of mantle heating (heat originating from the core-mantle boundary versus in-situ mantle heating) can produce dramatically different geodynamic regimes.

==== Time-dependent versus quasi-steady states ====
For computational purposes, early exoplanet mantle convection models assumed the planet was in a quasi-steady state, that is, the heat input from the core-mantle boundary or internal mantle heating remained constant throughout the model run. Later studies such as that of Noack and Breuer (2014) show that this assumption may have important implications, resulting in a gradual increase of the temperature differential between the core and mantle. A planet modeled with realistic decrease of internal heating throughout time had a lower likelihood of entering a plate tectonic regime compared to the quasi-steady state model.

==== Damage theory ====
A flaw of viscoelastic-plastic models of exoplanet geodynamics is in order for plate tectonics to be initiated, unrealistically low yield stress values are required. Additionally, plates in viscoelastic-plastic models have no deformation memory, i.e. as soon as the stress on a lithospheric plate drops below its yield stress it returns to its pre-deformation strength. This stands in contrast to Earth-based observations, which show that plates preferentially break along preexisting areas of deformation.

Damage theory attempts to address this model flaw by simulating voids created in areas of strain, representing the mechanical pulverization of coarse grains of rock into finer grains. In such models, damage is balanced by “healing”, or the temperature and pressure-driven dynamic recrystallization of smaller grains into larger ones. If the reduction of grain size (damage) is intensely localized in a stagnant lid, an incipient crack in the mantle can turn into a full-blown rift, initiating plate tectonics. Conversely, a high surface temperature will have more efficient lithospheric healing, which is another potential explanation for why Venus has a stagnant lid and Earth does not.

== Potential determining factors for Earth-like exoplanet geodynamic regimes ==
=== Initial temperature ===
For rocky exoplanets larger than Earth, the initial interior temperature after planetary convalescence may be an important controlling factor of surface motion. Noack and Breuer (2014) demonstrated that a core-mantle boundary initial temperature of 6100 K would likely form a stagnant lid, while a planet of the same dimensions with an initial core-mantle boundary 2000 K hotter will likely eventually evolve plate tectonics. This effect is diminished on planets smaller than Earth, because their smaller planetary interiors efficiently redistribute heat, reducing core-mantle heat gradients that drive mantle convection.

=== Insolation ===
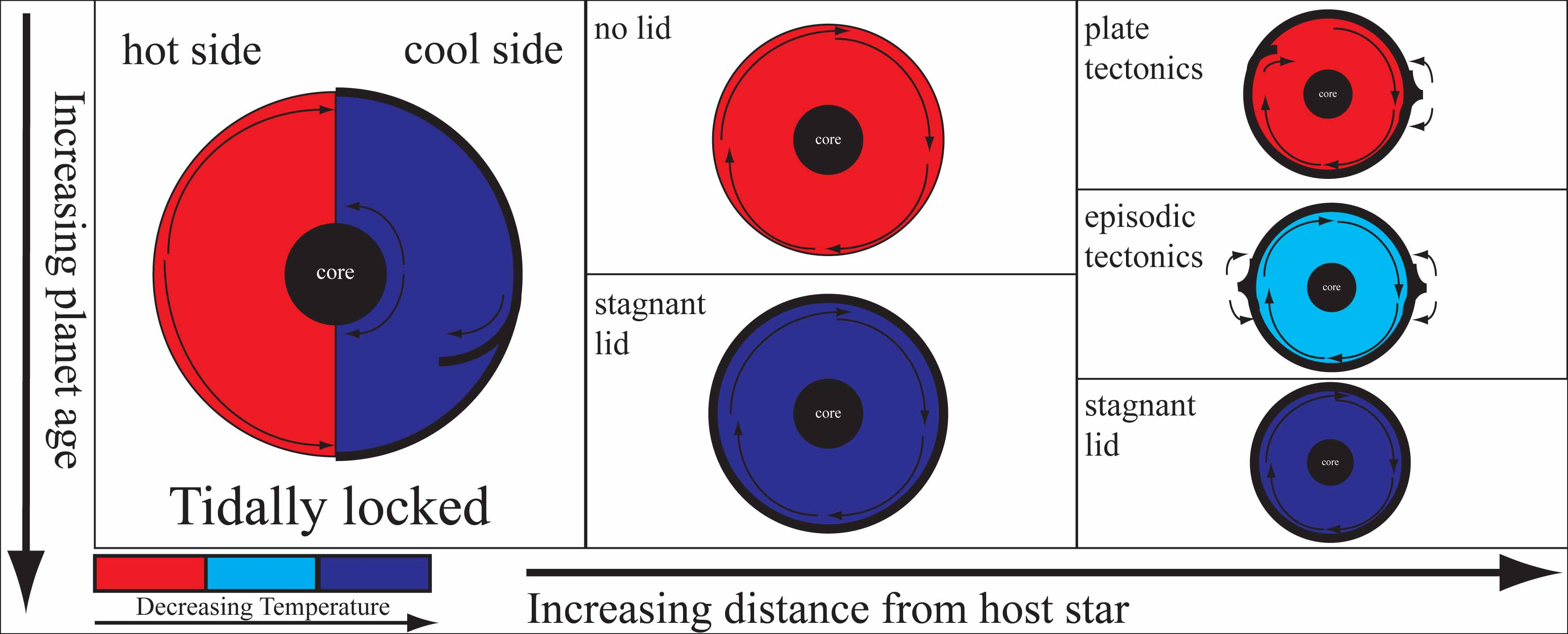
Conceptual plot of the effect of distance from a host star vs. planetary age on terrestrial exoplanet geodynamics. Example planets not drawn to scale.

External sources of planetary heat (namely, radiation from a planet's host star) can have drastic effects on geodynamic regime. With all other variables held constant, an Earth-sized exoplanet with a surface temperature of 273 K will evolve over its geological lifetime from a plate tectonic regime, to episodic periods of plate tectonics interspersed with stagnant lid geodynamics, to a terminal stagnant lid phase as interior heat is exhausted. Meanwhile, a "hot" planet (759 K surface temperature) under the same initial conditions will have an amorphous surface (due to lithospheric yield stress being constantly exceeded) to a stagnant lid as interior heat is exhausted, with no plate tectonics observed.

Planets closer than 0.5 astronomical units from their star are likely to be tidally locked; these planets are expected to have drastically different temperature regimes on their "day" and "night" sides. When this scenario is modeled, the day side displays mobile lid convection with diffuse surface deformation flowing toward the night side, while the night side has a plate tectonic regime of downwelling plates and a deep mantle return flow in the direction of the night side. A temperature contrast of 400 K between day and night sides is required to create such a stable system.

=== Presence of surface water ===
While early modeling studies emphasized the size of a given exoplanet as a critical factor of geodynamic regime, later studies showed that the influence of size may be small to the point of irrelevance compared to the presence of surface water. For plate tectonics to be a sustained, rather than episodic process, the friction coefficient at the upper boundary layer (the mantle-lithosphere interface) must be below a critical value; while some models arrive at a critically low friction coefficient via increased upper boundary layer temperature (and subsequent decreased viscosity), Korenaga (2010) demonstrates high pore fluid content can lower the coefficient of friction below the critical value as well.

== Implications of exoplanet geodynamic regime ==
A planet in a stagnant lid regime has a much lower likelihood of being habitable than one with active surface recycling. The outgassing of mantle-derived carbon and sulfur that occurs along plate margins is critical for producing and maintaining an atmosphere, which insulates a planet from solar radiation and wind. The same atmosphere also regulates surface temperature, providing a clement condition for biological activity. It is for these reasons the search for exoplanets will be steered largely towards finding ones with a plate tectonic geodynamic regime, since they are better candidates for human habitation.
