= Geology of the Lake District =

Geology of region in northwest England

Geological map of the Lake District showing the main structures and areas of mineralisation

Location in England

The geology of England's Lake District is dominated by sedimentary and volcanic rocks of mainly Ordovician age underpinned by large granitic intrusions. Younger sedimentary sequences outcrop on the edges of the Lake District area, with Silurian to the south, Carboniferous to the north, east, and west and Permo-Triassic to the west and east. The entire area was covered by a Mesozoic sequence that was eroded off during the Palaeogene uplift related to the opening of the North Atlantic. During the Quaternary the area was affected by repeated glaciations, which sculpted the current mountainous landscape.

== Early Palaeozoic ==
In early Palaeozoic times the area was on the northern margin of the microcontinent of Avalonia, which was moving northwards as the Iapetus Ocean began to close. Initial deepwater sedimentation recorded by the Skiddaw Group was followed by the development of a continental arc caused by the subduction of Iapetus oceanic crust beneath the Avalonian margin. This magmatism produced both the Borrowdale Volcanic Group sequence and the older granitic intrusions, which are the preserved magma chambers to the volcanics. Continental collision began near the end of the Ordovician as southward subduction ceased and northward subduction beneath the margin of Laurentia began, forming the Southern Uplands accretionary wedge. As the collision progressed the Lake District area became part of a foreland basin in which the Windermere Supergroup sediments were deposited, initially interfingering with the volcanics and then overlaying them. The collision reached its end during the Early Devonian, part of the Acadian Orogeny with the final closure of Iapetus and the intrusion of late orogenic granites.

=== Skiddaw Group ===
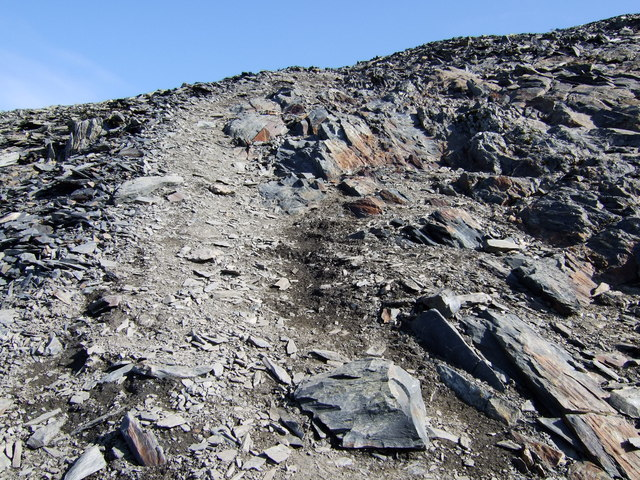
Slates of the Kirk Stile Formation of the Skiddaw Group, exposed just below Skiddaw summit ridge

The Skiddaw Group are the oldest rocks known from the Lake District. They are mainly Ordovician in age, from possibly Cambrian up to Llanvirn (upper middle Ordovician). The sequence, which is up to about 5 km in thickness, consist mainly of mudstones and siltstones, with lesser amounts of sandstone. Following deformation and low-grade metamorphism during the Acadian Orogeny, they now have a well-developed slaty cleavage, giving rise to their common name, the Skiddaw Slates. The group is divided into two main areas, the northern and central fells, to either side of the WSW-ENE trending Causey Pike Fault, with distinct successions developed.

=== Eycott Volcanic Group ===
The Eycott Volcanic Group (EVG) forms the youngest part of the preserved Ordovician sequence in the northernmost part of the Lake District. This set of mainly andesitic lavas and tuffs, with related minor intrusions is of Caradocian (Sandbian to Early Katian) age. In terms of their chemistry the EVG are transitional between moderately potassic tholeiitic and calc-alkaline in type.

=== Borrowdale Volcanic Group ===
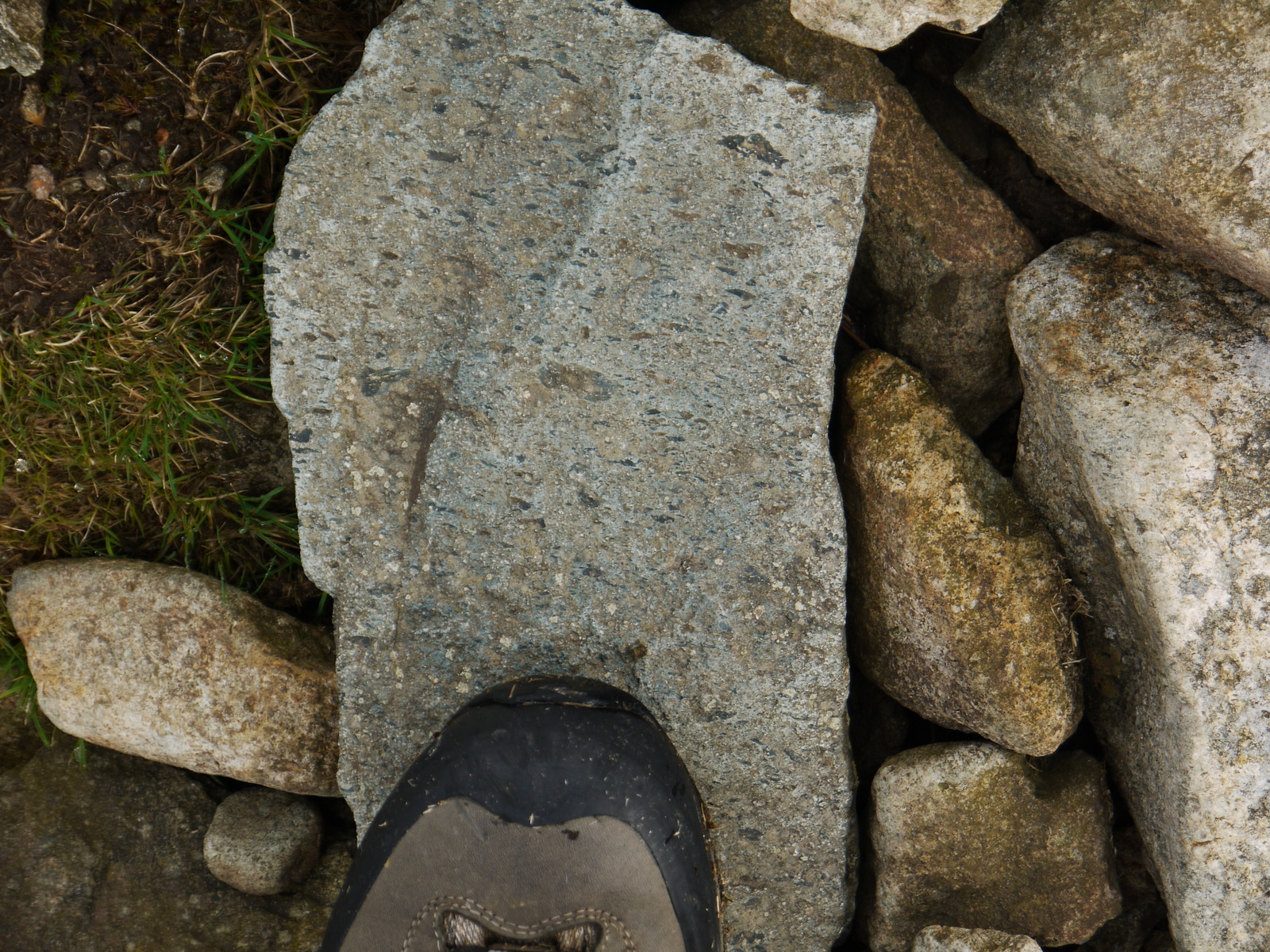
Dacitic lapilli tuff of the Helvellyn Tuff Formation (Helvellyn Basin succession), on High Crag (Nethermost Pike)

The Borrowdale Volcanic Group (BVG) lies unconformably above the Skiddaw Group, and is of Caradocian age. It is similar to, but distinct from, the Eycott Volcanic Group. It consists of a thick sequence of basaltic, andesitic, dacitic and rhyolitic lavas and pyroclastic rocks with interbedded volcaniclastic sediments. It is subdivided informally into two parts known as the Lower Borrowdale Volcanic Group and Upper Borrowdale Volcanic groups. It is further subdivided into many formations, of which only a few have regional extent.

In terms of chemistry, the BVG are moderate to highly potassic calk-alkaline in type.

==== Lower Borrowdale Volcanic Group ====
The lower part of the succession is dominantly andesitic. Locally in the western part, the lowest formation is the non-volcanic sandstones of the Latterbarrow Formation. In the Furness Inlier the Greenscoe Tuff Formation is the lowermost unit. In the southwest at Millom Park the Whinny Bank Tuff Formation is the lowermost unit, overlain by the Po House Tuff Formation. The Birker Fell Andesite Formation makes up most of the lower BVG, varying in thickness from 980 m to 2700 m.

==== Upper Borrowdale Volcanic Group ====
The upper part of the group consists of mainly intermediate to acidic pyroclastic rocks and interbedded volcaniclastic sediments. There are four main successions recognised at the base of the upper sequence: the Duddon Basin, the Scafell Caldera, the Haweswater Caldera and the Kentmere succession. These are all followed by volcaniclastic sandstone of the Seathwaite Fell Sandstone Formation, which is developed over almost the whole outcrop, varying in thickness from 30 m to >1100 m. This is followed by the equally extensive Lincombe Tarns Tuff Formation, which is an ignimbrite. The uppermost part is the Helvellyn Basin succession, consisting of volcaniclastic sandstones, dacitic lavas, andesitic lavas and tuffs, and dacitic ignimbrites.

=== Windermere Supergroup ===
The transition from the top of the Borrowdale Volcanics into the overlying Dent Group is marked by an unconformity. The Dent Group is of latest Ordovician age and forms the lowermost part of the Windermere Supergroup. It was deposited in shallow marine conditions, consisting mainly of calcareous mudstones, siltstones, limestones and shales. There is evidence of continued volcanism, with tuffs locally developed at various levels within the group. The Dent Group is overlain unconformably by the Stockdale Group, a sequence of mudstones and siltstones deposited during the latest Ordovician to earliest Silurian. The overlying Sheinwoodian to Gorstian Tranearth Group consists mainly of hemipelagite (clays and silts) with some turbiditic sandstones. This is succeeded by turbiditic sandstones, siltstones and hemipelagites of the Gorstian Coniston Group. The youngest unit is the Ludlow to Pridoli Kendal Group, which consists of couplets of graded siltstone and mudstone, locally with thick turbiditic sandstones.

=== Granitic intrusions ===
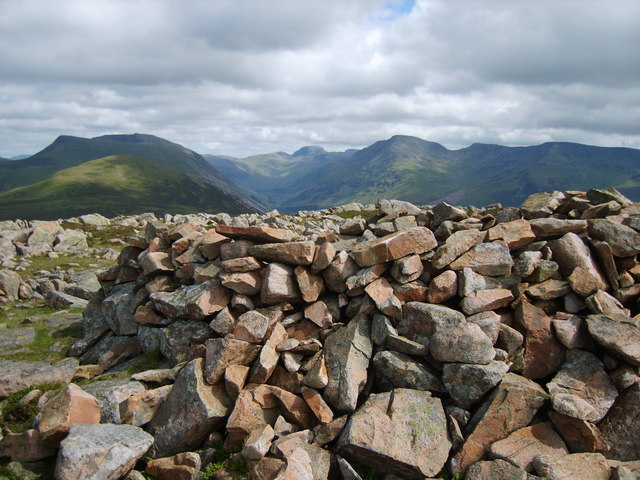
Fragments of Ennerdale Granophyre on the summit of Great Borne

The Lake District was affected by two stages of granitic intrusion. The earlier Ordovician granites were intruded at the same time as the BVG, representing the solidified magma chambers related to the volcanics, which later uplift has now exposed at the surface. Intrusions of this age include the Ennerdale Granophyre and the Eskdale Granite.

The later granites were intruded during the Early Devonian as part of group of intrusions found within a SW–NE trending belt that straddles the Iapetus Suture. Granites of this age include the Shap Granite, the Skiddaw Granite and the unexposed granite responsible for the Crummock Water aureole.

As a result of these two separate magmatic events, the Lake District is underpinned by a large batholith with an area of about 1500 km^{2}. Most of the batholith is thought to be Late Ordovician in age but with some Early Devonian contributions.

== Late Palaeozoic ==
After the end of the Acadian collision, Northern England was affected by a phase of Early Carboniferous extension, possibly related to the subduction of Rheic Ocean crust beneath Gondwana. Preserved Lower Carbonifeous rocks are found to the west, north and east of the Lake District in the East Irish Sea, Solway and Vale of Eden basins. The sequence consists of limestones of the Carboniferous Limestone Supergroup, overlain by sandstones of the Millstone Grit Group and deltaic sandstones, shales and coals of the Coal Measures Group.

The only Permian rocks known from the Lake District area are from the upper part of the sequence and form part of the early syn-rift associated with the mainly Triassic rifting event. This sequence consists of the Appleby Group, dominantly sandstones, and the Cumbrian Coast Group consisting mainly of siltstones and dolomites overlain by evaporites and red shales (locally with the development of halite). On the western edge of the Lake District and in the Vale of Eden the Appleby Group includes thick breccias, known as the Brockram.

== Mesozoic ==
The Mesozoic saw the first stages of break-up of the supercontinent of Pangaea. Rifting began at the end of the Permian, with development of a series of rift basins over much of the British Isles. The rifts became more localised during the Jurassic and by the Cretaceous, most of the rifting has stopped, apart from the area south of the Variscan Front, where rifting continued into the Early Cretaceous. The Late Cretaceous saw the inundation of almost all parts of the British Isles by the "chalk sea".

Triassic age rocks of the New Red Sandstone outcrop to the northeast and southwest of the Lake District massif. To the southwest they were deposited at the eastern edge of the East Irish Sea Basin. To the northeast, they were deposited in the Vale of Eden Basin. The Triassic sequences consist mainly of continental sandstones. At the end of the Triassic, shallow seas transgressed over all of the Triassic basins. There are no rocks of Jurassic or Cretaceous age preserved anywhere near the Lake District. However, based on the analysis of apatite fission tracks and estimates from neighbouring preserved sequences, it is thought that the Lake District was covered by between about 700 to 1750 m of Triassic, Jurassic and Cretaceous sediments by the Palaeocene that has since been removed by erosion.

== Cenozoic ==
During the Palaeogene, the Lake District, like most of the northern and western British Isles was affected by the break-up of the Atlantic at the end of the Palaeocene, including the formation of the North Atlantic Igneous Province. The timing of the exhumation that removed the Mesozoic section from the top of the Lake District massif remains uncertain, although a significant part of the uplift is thought to have been caused by underplating at the end of the Palaeocene. The amount of Neogene exhumation is particularly poorly constrained.

== Quaternary ==
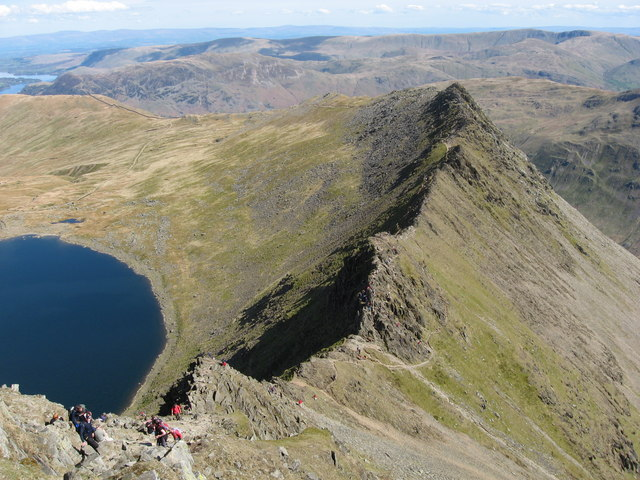
Glacial landforms, the arête Striding Edge and a cirque filled by Red Tarn

The Quaternary saw repeated glaciations of the Lake District area with the development of an ice cap, although the current landscape is the result of the Last glacial period, which occurred over the period 115,000 to 11,700 years ago. As the Lake District was an upland area it was unaffected by the main British-Irish ice sheet, which flowed around the margins of the massif.

=== Devensian glaciation ===
The main period of glaciation to shape the Lake District was the Devensian (the British name for the last glacial period). There were undoubtedly earlier glacial phases, but all signs of them were removed by erosion associated with the Devensian phase. The radial pattern of the main deeply glaciated valleys is thought to reflect the original radial pre-glacial drainage pattern of the massif. At various times, the peaks were either completely covered by ice or formed protruding nunataks.

=== Younger Dryas ===
Some of the best preserved glacial deposits were formed during the Younger Dryas stadial, which followed on from the relatively warm Late Glacial Interstadial about 12,900 years ago. A this time permanent ice reappeared in the Lake District. At its maximum the ice is thought to have been in the form of two areas of plateau glaciation in the central and eastern fells.

== Structure ==
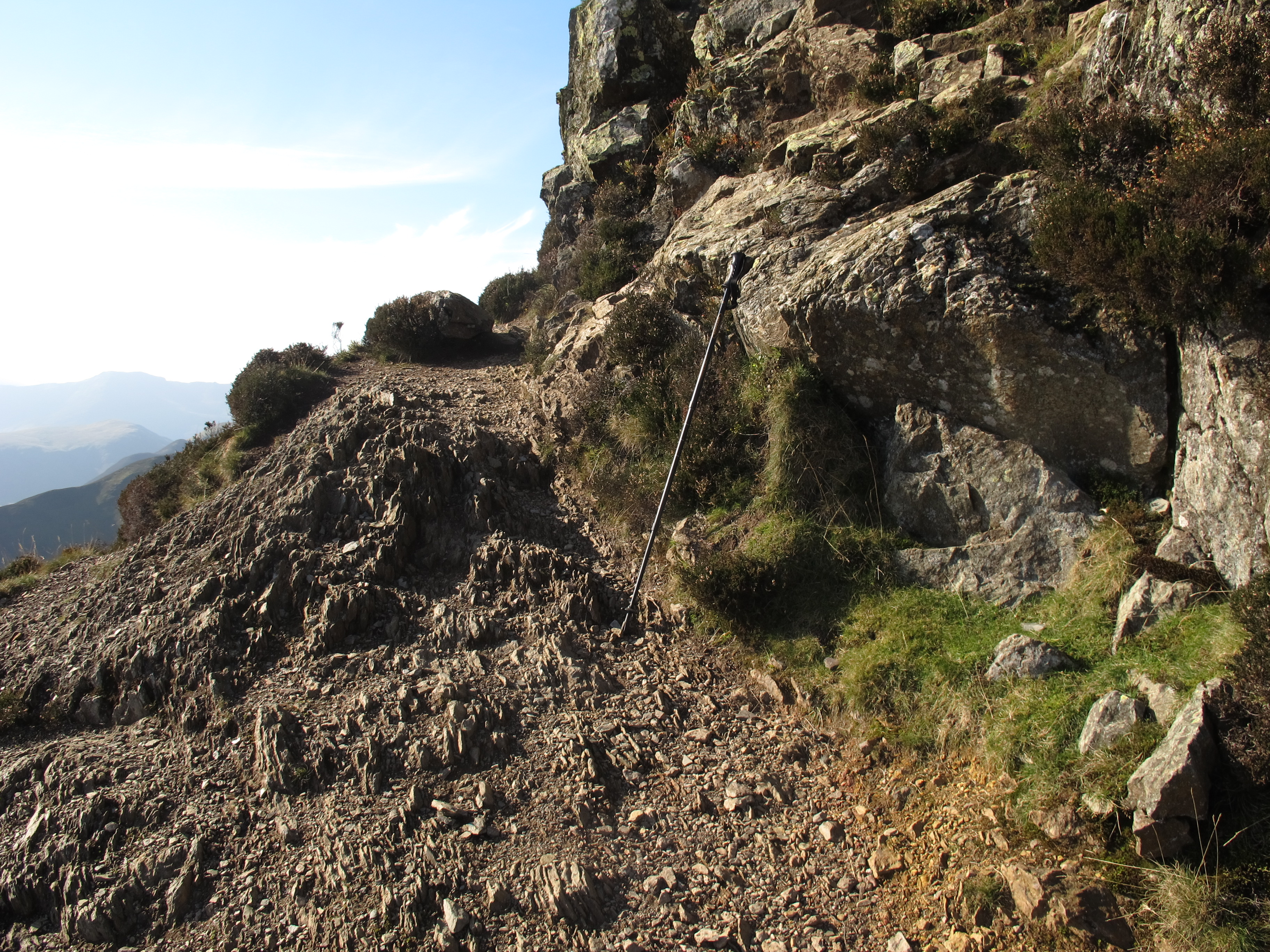
The Causey Pike Fault, with rocks of the Crummock Water metasomatic aureole, thrust over a sandstone olistolith of the Buttermere Formation, just below the top of Causey Pike

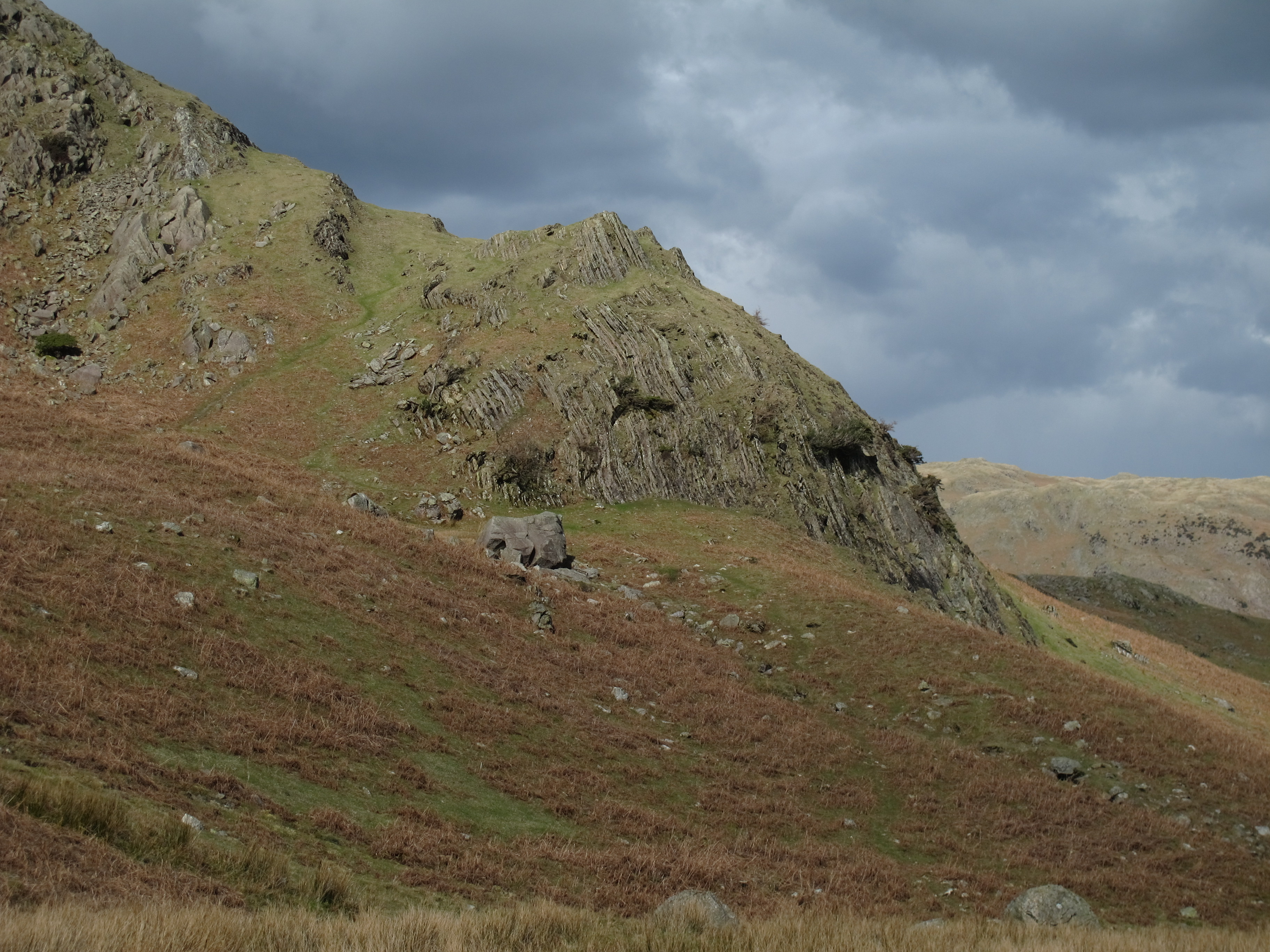
Steeply south-dipping Dent Group calcareous mudstones overlying volcanics of the Lincombe Tarn Tuff Formation on the southern edge of the Coniston Fells, part of the Westmorland Monocline

=== Pre-Acadian ===
The earliest known structures that affected the rocks of the Lake District are folds in the Skiddaw Group that are thought to be a result of slumping. It has also been proposed that there were active extensional faults during deposition of the group, consistent with the presence of two distinct sequences. In this model, the Causey Pike Fault is one of the early faults, which was reactivated during the Acadian Orogeny as a thrust.

The eruption of the Borrowdale Volcanic Group was accompanied by volcano-tectonic faulting. The faults of this age are extensional in type and thought to be a result of caldera formation.

=== Acadian ===
The main period of structuring was of Early Devonian age and part of the Acadian Orogeny. Most of the finer-grained sedimentary rocks in the Ordovician sequence took on a well-developed slaty cleavage. In the BVG, strong cleavage is mainly restricted to finer-grained volcaniclastic rocks interbedded with the volcanics. The rocks of the Windermere Supergroup have a variably developed cleavage. The cleavage has an overall WSW-ENE trend, although regionally it is somewhat arcuate, being more SW-NE trending in the west and more west-east trending in the east.

The main Acadian structures in the Skiddaw Group are a set of thrust faults, of which the Causey Pike Fault has the greatest extent, being recognised across the whole of the main outcrop of the group. This and other thrusts within the Skiddaw Group are thought to be reactivated extensional faults that were active during sedimentation.

The Borrowdale Volcanic Group sequence was folded during the Acadian and some of the volcano-tectonic faults were reactivated. Three large synclinal folds were formed, the Haweswater, Scafell and Ulpha synclines. In all cases, these synclines are thought to be modifications of older volcano-tectonic features.

The southernmost part of the BVG sequence and the overlying Windermere Supergroup dip steeply to the south forming the Westmorland Monocline. Continuing to the south a series of upright folds are developed, reducing in amplitude towards the south. The first and largest of the folds is the Bannisdale Syncline.

=== Post-Acadian ===
During the Carboniferous period, the Lake District massif initially formed an emergent high. The north-dipping Maryport Fault formed on its northern margin as part of the regional Early Carboniferous extensional event, possibly reactivating an Acadian thrust structure. It was reactivated during the Variscan Orogeny as a reverse fault, leading to inversion of the Solway Basin to the north. The Lake District Boundary Fault on the western margin may also have been active at this time, possibly reactivating an Ordovician volcano-tectonic fault in part.

In late Permian to Triassic times the Lake District Boundary Fault was an active extensional structure, forming part of the margin to the East Irish Sea Basin. Activity on this structure continued episodically through the Triassic up to the Early Cretaceous.

== Mineralisation ==
Mineralisation has affected all of the Ordovician rocks in the Lake District, whether sedimentary, volcanic or intrusive. The distribution of this mineralisation suggests a close relationship to the batholith that underlies the area. The mineral veins indicate that there were several separate periods of mineralisation, with each period being associated with particular minerals.

=== Graphite ===
At Seathwaite there is major deposit of graphite. The graphite appears as pipes and veins associated with a diorite intrusion, presumed to be of Caradoc age. Organic-rich sediments in the Skiddaw Group mudstones are considered the likely source for the carbon. These high-temperature veins were probably deposited from aqueous fluids rich in carbon dioxide and methane driven by the effects of the dioritic intrusion.

=== Copper ===
Copper mineralisation is mainly hosted by the Borrowdale Volcanic Group, with particularly important veins found in the Coniston, Haweswater and Ulpha areas. The main copper mineral found is chalcopyrite, locally accompanied by bornite, chalcocite and tennantite. The veins also contain arsenic and iron sulphides, and locally magnetite. Other minerals in minor to trace amounts include native bismuth, other bismuth minerals and locally gold. The veins typically have chlorite, quartz and dolomite as gangue minerals. The veins were probably deposited from moderately saline brines, with the metallic elements derived from the volcanics and the sulphur from the underlying Skiddaw Group. This period of mineralisation probably dates to the late Caradoc as the veins clearly predate the Acadian-aged cleavage.

=== Tungsten ===
North-south trending veins containing the tungsten minerals scheelite and wolframite are associated with the Skiddaw granite around Carrock Fell in the northern lakes. Associated molybdenite gives Re-Os age of 405 Ma (Early Devonian), similar in age to the Skiddaw intrusion (399 Ma). The veins are thought to have been deposited from moderately saline brines rich in tungsten.

=== Lead-zinc ===
Lead-zinc mineralisation is found over most of the Ordovician outcrop, but particularly in the northern part. The greatest number of veins is found at Brandlehow, in the Caldbeck Fells, at Eagle Crag, Force Crag, Greenside, Hartsop, Helvellyn, around Threlkeld, Thornthwaite and the Newlands Valley. The main minerals are galena and sphalerite. The galena locally contains up to 838 ppm of silver. Common gangue minerals are baryte, calcite, dolomite and quartz, locally with siderite and fluorite. Estimated temperatures for these veins is in the range 110–130 °C. The lead and zinc are thought to have been derived by the leaching of Skiddaw Group rocks, the underlying batholith or Carboniferous sediments of the Solway Basin, by Carboniferous seawater. These veins are seen to cut copper-bearing veins and they are thought to be either Late Carboniferous to Early Permian in age, consistent with the age of similar veins in the northern Pennines, or Permo-Triassic in age, similar to the haematite mineralisation.

=== Iron ===
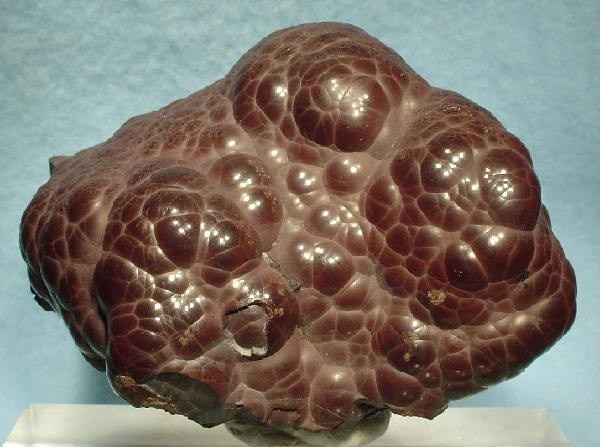
Botryoidal haematite ("kidney ore") from Egremont in the West Cumbria iron orefield

Iron mineralisation, in the form of haematite veins, occurs across the northern and western Lake District, hosted particularly in the Skiddaw Group slates. It is typically of the form known as "kidney ore" with most of the veins being almost pure haematite. The most significant haematite mineralisation, however, is in the form of large orebodies replacing Carboniferous limestone in the West Cumbrian iron orefield on the western margin of the Lake District. The similarities between the orebodies hosted in the limestone and those in the Ordovician rocks suggests that they were formed together. The most likely source for the iron is the Permo-Triassic sequence that lies to the west of the Lake District in the East Irish Sea Basin. Orebodies are concentrated wherever Carboniferous limestone is in direct contact with permeable Permo-Triassic rocks. The same iron-rich fluids moving eastwards away from the basin within the sedimentary cover sequence would then have had access to open fractures in the Ordovician rocks, forming the vein deposits there.

=== Other minerals ===
The cobalt minerals alloclasite, cobaltite, glaucodot and skutterudite have been found in very small amounts associated with apatite-chlorite veins near Causey Pike. Tourmaline is found associated with some of the granites and in the Crummock Water aureole. Antimony, mainly in the form of stibnite, is found in a minor group of veins affecting the Skiddaw Group and the BVG. Baryte, a common gangue mineral in the lead-zinc veins, locally becomes the dominant mineral in veins in the Caldbeck Fells and Force Crag. Small amounts of gold have also been found.

== Economic geology ==
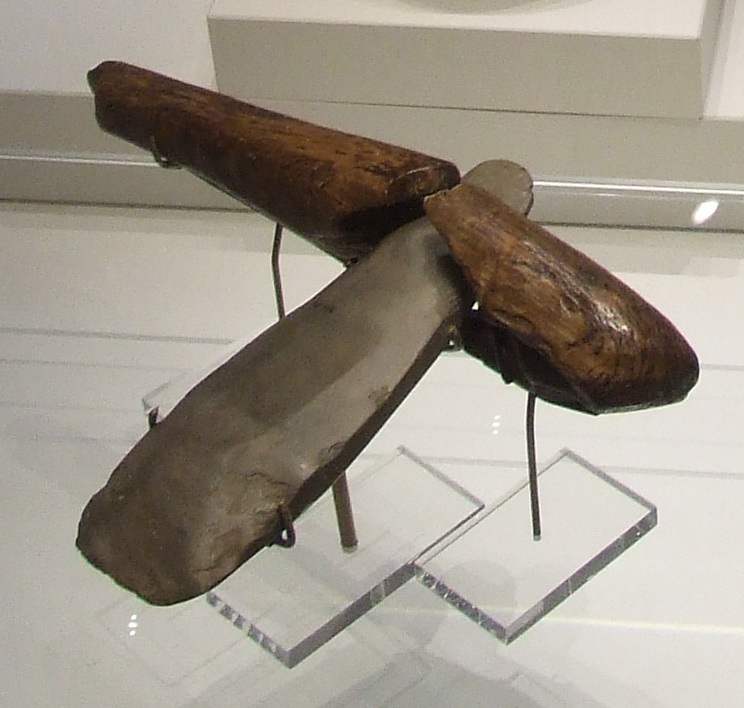
Neolithic stone axe from Langdale

The Lake District has a long history of mining and quarrying going back to at least Neolithic times, with the stone axe factory at Langdale. There are very few active mines or quarries in the Lake District at present, with the quarries working the Shap Granite being a notable exception.

=== Mining ===
The earliest records of mineral extraction in the Lake District is evidence of haematite mining in the Iron Age in Furness and during Roman times in West Cumbria.

Many mines were active from the 16th-century, following the involvement of the Society of Mines Royal, who brought in German miners for their expertise.

==== Caldbeck Fells ====
There are more than a dozen individual mines in the area of the Caldbeck Fells, which were an important source of copper, lead, arsenic, baryte and tungsten from the 16th century up to the 1980s. The larger copper mines included Mexico Mine, Red Gill Mine, Roughton Gill Mine and Silver Gill Mine. Carrock Fell Mine was the last in the area to remain active and the only one to produce wolfram and scheelite in England outside Devon and Cornwall.

==== Goldscope mine ====
Although there is evidence of small-scale near-surface mining in the Newlands Valley area from the 13th-century, mining on a large scale began in 1564. The german miners brought in to work it by the Mines Royal named it "Gottesgab" (God's gift) due to the richness of the copper deposit, which became corrupted over time to "Goldscope". During the 16th and 17th centuries it was worked for copper, but became disused during the 18th century. It was reopened for lead mining during the 19th century, before final closure in 1920.

==== Force Crag ====
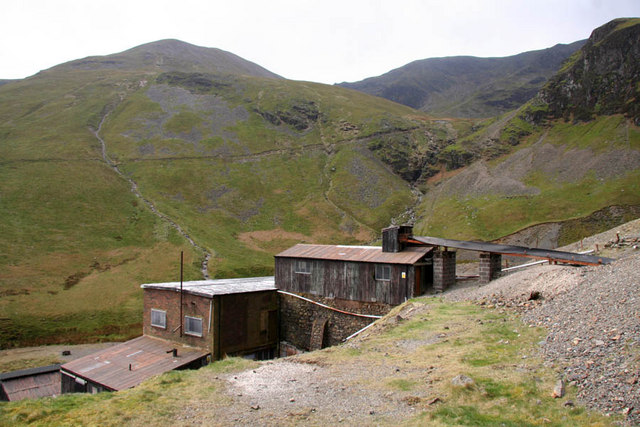
Derelict remains of Force Crag Mine photographed in May 2009

This mine, at the head of the Coledale valley, was initially opened in the mid-19th century to produce lead and silver. From 1867 until its closure in 1991 it was worked mainly for baryte and zinc. The mine produced 60,000 tons of baryte during its working life.

==== Seathwaite graphite mine ====
Near Seathwaite in Borrowdale an unusually large deposit of high quality graphite, known locally as "wad", was found in the form of veins. Although the deposit was known from at least the early 15th century, significant production only began in the early 17th century and continued until 1891, when the mine finally closed. The very irregular geometry of the veins led to a complex set of workings. Individual pods of graphite could be quite large. For example, Dixon's Pipe, discovered in 1803, generated more than 30 tons of graphite, at more than £1300 per ton.

==== West Cumbrian iron orefield ====
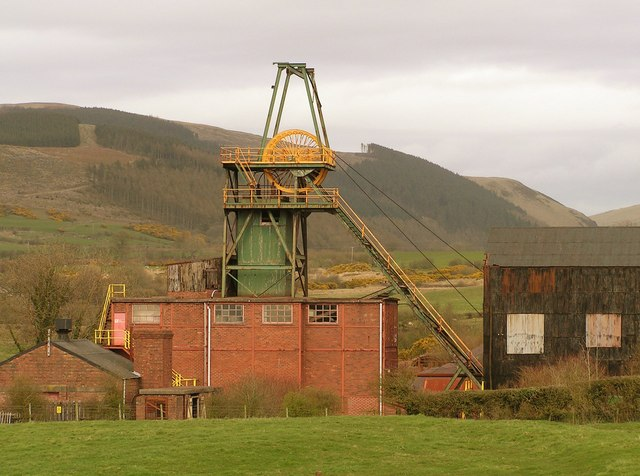
Winding gear at the Florence mine at Egremont

Large deposits of hematite hosted in Carboniferous Limestone, were exploited by a series of mines on the northwestern margin of the Lake District. The Cleator Moor to Egremont area was particularly important, with Bigrigg, just north of Egremont, being the earliest for which there are written records, showing that this area was active as early as 1179. At the Langhorn Mine, a large high quality orebody was found, which had produced 12,500 tons of ore by 1709. In the 20th century, exploration between Egremont and Haile led to the development of three separate mines, Ullcoats, Florence and Beckermet, that were eventually linked together. This combined mine was the last to be active in West Cumbria, carrying on until 2008, if only on a small scale, when flooding brought operations to a final halt.

==== Coniston ====
The Mines Royal began working on the copper deposits near Coniston at the end of the 16th century until 1642, when mining was interrupted by the English Civil War. It did not begin again in earnest until 1758, when the Macclesfield Copper Company started to work the Bonsor Vein, continuing to a depth below the surface of 300 ft (91 m) by 1795, where work once again stopped. In 1824 the experienced mining engineer John Taylor oversaw a major expansion of the mine and by 1856, the mine had its most productive year, with an output of 3,659 tons of ore. From that peak, output dropped off rapidly and by the end of the century virtually all mining activity had stopped.

=== Building stone ===
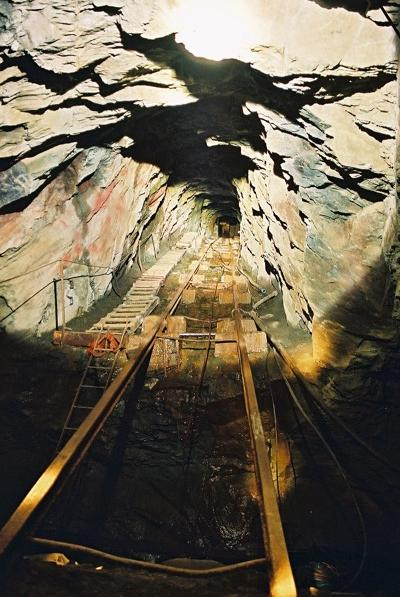
An incline inside the Honister Slate Mine

Various of the rock types in the Lake District have been quarried for building stone.

==== Slate ====
The Skiddaw Group slates have mainly been used in buildings around its area of outcrop as rubble stone as the slates are of too low quality for use in roofing.

The strongly cleaved volcaniclastic units (tuffs) within the BVG have in contrast locally produced good quality slates that have been widely quarried and more recently extracted by mining. Several different bands of slate have been worked across the outcrop, for instance at Buttermere, along Borrowdale (Honister, Yewcrag, Rigg Head and Castle Crag) and from the Duddon Estuary up to Mosedale (including Broughton Moor, Kirskstone and Coniston). Light green, silver grey and blue-black varieties have all been worked. They have been used for roofing both in the Lake District and elsewhere in the United Kingdom. The Honister Slate Mine is the only mine in the Lake District still producing slates of this type.

Good quality slates are also found in parts of the Windermere Supergroup, particularly the blue-grey slates of the Tranearth Group, known as "Burlington Slates". These have been produced in large quantities since the 17th century. A large quarry working these slates is still in operation near Kirkby-in-Furness.

==== Limestone ====
Limestone has been quarried from the Carboniferous sequences on the margins of the Lake District. It has been mainly used as rubble stone or ashlar in buildings across the area, particularly in Kendal.

==== Sandstone ====
Sandstones of Carboniferous, Permian and Triassic age have all been used as building stone in the Lake District. Grey sandstones of the Yoredale Group were locally quarried and used in buildings. Red Penrith Sandstone and Brockram breccia of the Permian Appleby Group have been used as building stone in the area of their outcrop to the east and south of the Lake District. Red Triassic sandstones of the Sherwood Sandstone Group were widely quarried, with the largest quarries near St Bees, working since the 19th century, sending stone around the country and to the United States.

==== Granitic rocks ====
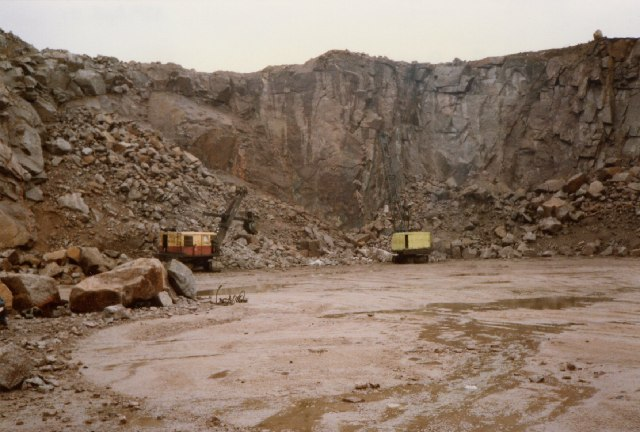
Shap Pink Quarry, pictured in 1989

Most of the Ordovician and Devonian granitic bodies in the Lake District have been quarried to some extent. Parts of the Eskdale granitic body has been worked for building stone, as seen in Muncaster Castle. The church of St James in Buttermere was partly constructed from rock taken from the Eskdale intrusion. The microgranite at Threlkeld was used in the Roman Catholic Our Lady of the Lakes and St Charles Church in Keswick. The Shap Granite has been quarried since the 19th century and still remains active, producing small amounts of ornamental stone.

=== Aggregate ===
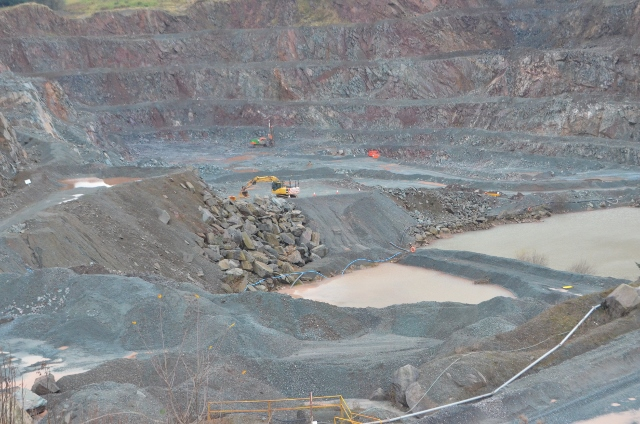
Ghyll Scaur quarry, the only source of very high specification aggregate in England

Aggregate comes from three main types of extraction: unconsolidated sand and gravel, crushed rock aggregate and secondary aggregate (by-products of other types of extraction or industrial processes).

==== Sand and gravel ====
There are working sand and gravel quarries in Cumbria, but all outside the National Park, such as Peel Place Quarry, which works fluvioglacial sand and gravel, near Holmrook and Cardewmires Quarry which works river deposits south west of Carlisle.

==== Crushed rock aggregate ====
Much of the crushed rock aggregate in the area comes from various layers in the Carboniferous limestone. Higher specification aggregates, such as those required for road surfacing, however, come mainly from sandstones and igneous rocks, both volcanic (BVG) and intrusive (various granitic bodies). Two quarries at Roan Edge (east of Kendal) and Holmscales are currently producing high specification roadstone from sandstone. The single quarry producing very high specification aggregate is at Ghyll Scaur, just north of Millom, which is the only currently available source for this quality of roadstone in England. It works a welded rhyolitic tuff from the Waberthwaite Tuff Formation of the BVG.
