= Coniston =

Coniston may refer to:

== Australia ==
- Coniston (Northern Territory), a cattle station
  - Coniston massacre, 1928
- Coniston, New South Wales
  - Coniston railway station, New South Wales
- Coniston, Tasmania, a town in the Derwent Valley

== United Kingdom ==
- Coniston, East Riding of Yorkshire
- Coniston Cold, North Yorkshire
- Coniston, Cumbria, a village
- Coniston Fells, a chain of hills and mountains in the Furness Fells, in the Lake District
  - Coniston Old Man (also called the Old Man of Coniston), the highest peak in the Coniston Fells
- Coniston Water, a lake in the Lake District
- Coniston Limestone, the sedimentary rock formation around Coniston, Cumbria.
- Coniston Group, a lithographic group named after Coniston, Cumbria.

== United States ==
- Coniston, California
- Coniston (novel), by American writer Winston Churchill

== Canada ==
- Coniston, Ontario, Canada

== See also ==
- Conistone, a village in Yorkshire, England
