= Howgill Fells =

Uplands in Northern England

Coordinates: 54.4°N 2.5°W

The Howgill Fells are uplands in Northern England between the Lake District and the Yorkshire Dales, lying roughly within a triangle formed by the town of Sedbergh and the villages of Ravenstonedale and Tebay. The name Howgill derives from the Old Norse word haugr meaning a hill or barrow, plus gil meaning a narrow valley.

== Geography ==
The Howgill Fells are bounded by the River Lune (and the M6 motorway to the west), to the north by upper reaches of the River Lune, and to the east by the River Rawthey.

The fells include two Marilyns: The Calf – 2,218 ft (676 m) and Yarlside – 2,096 ft (639 m) and a number of smaller peaks, including five Hewitts. Since 2017, the entire range has been included within the Yorkshire Dales National Park. They lie within Westmorland and Furness and are shared by the historic counties of Yorkshire (West Riding) and Westmorland.

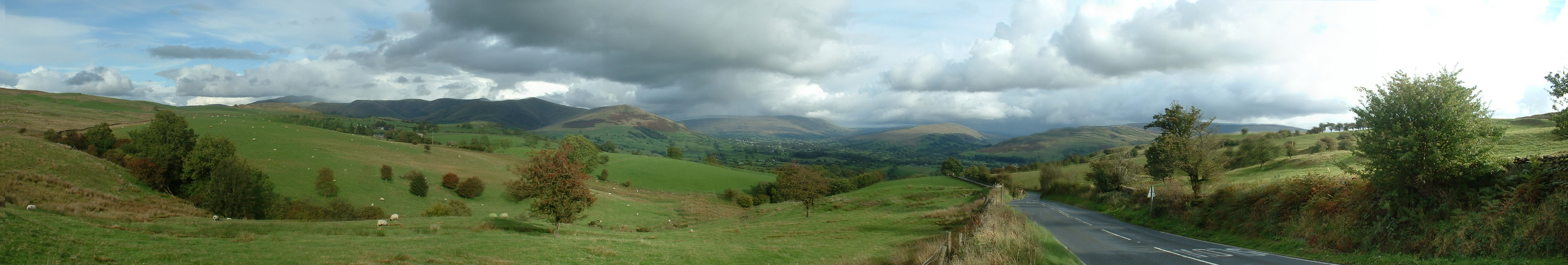
Howgills panorama taken from the A684 into Sedbergh from Kendal
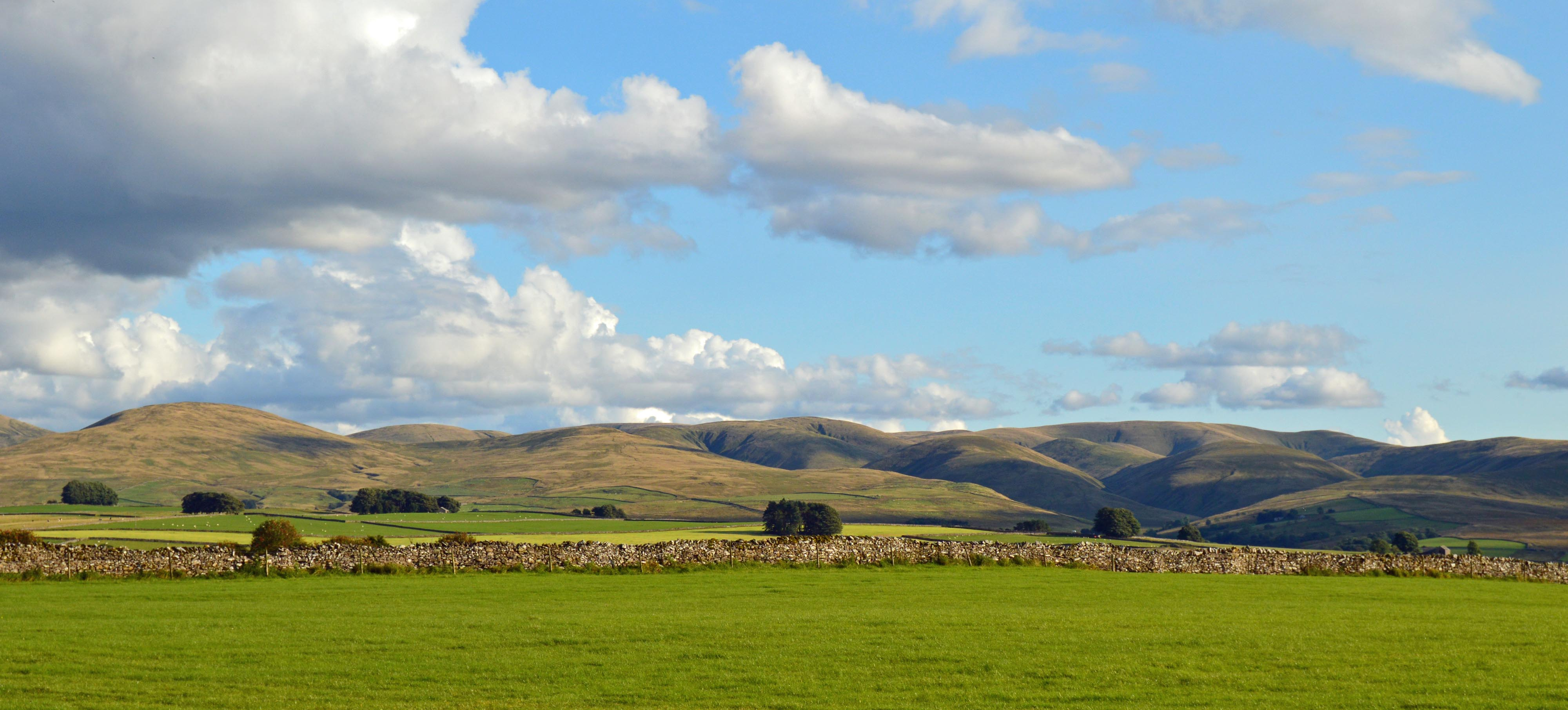
Panorama of Howgill Fells in evening from the hamlet of Raisbeck near Orton in the upper Lune valley

== Geology ==
Unlike the Carboniferous Limestone landscapes typical of much of the Yorkshire Dales and Orton Fells, the range is formed from lower Palaeozoic slates and gritstones. An inlier of Ashgill age rocks of the Ordovician Dent Group in the vicinity of Backside Beck in the east are the oldest rocks in the range whilst the oldest Silurian rocks are the laminated siltstones of the Llandovery age Stockdale Group. These are overlain by more than 250m thickness of dark grey mudstones and siltstones of the Brathay Formation which, with the overlying Coldwell and Wray Castle formations are collected together as the Tranearth Group and, in age terms, span the Wenlock / Ludlow boundary. The larger part of the range is formed from sandstones of the Coniston Group. This unit is roughly 1000m thick; it includes a basal Screes Gill Formation up to 300m thick and also contains numerous siltstone bands. These are overlain by the sandstones, mudstones and siltstones of the Bannisdale and Kirkby Moor formations, collected together as the Kendal Group.

Structurally the bedrock is folded on a broad scale into a roughly east–west aligned Carlingill Anticline with the Castle Knotts Syncline to its south. Numerous smaller amplitude folds are developed on the limbs of these two folds. A series of normal faults aligned between N-S and NE-SW cut the range whilst its eastern and southeastern margin is defined by a combination of the Sedbergh, Rawthey and Dent faults.

Quaternary deposits include widespread glacial till in the valleys and on lower ground generally. Though the range was covered by the British ice-sheet during successive glaciations, Cautley Crag is the only well-developed glacial cirque within the Howgill Fells. Post-glacial river sands and gravels are found on the floor of river valleys, notably on the margins of the range. Peat is found on some hill spurs but is not widely developed whilst scree is found in places, notably around the Cautley Spout area. Debris cones of cobbles are found, notably in Langdale and Bowderdale. The Lune Gorge which defines the western edge of the Howgills is a major glacial meltwater channel.
