= Bacton Group =

- Stratigraphic range: Early Triassic epoch
- Type: Group
- Sub-units: Bunter Shale Formation, Bunter Sandstone Formation
- Underlies: Haisborough Group
- Overlies: Zechstein Group
- Thickness: up to 600m

Lithology
- Primary: mudstones
- Other: dolomitic sandstone

Location
- Region: North Sea
- Country: England

Type section
- Named for: Bacton
- Named by: Rhys, G.H.

The Bacton Group is a Triassic lithostratigraphic group (a sequence of rock strata) beneath the southern part of the North Sea. The name is derived from Bacton on the Norfolk coast. These strata, which are up to 600 m thick are the offshore equivalent of the Roxby Formation and Sherwood Sandstone Group which occur in northeast England. The group comprises a lower Bunter Shale Formation of red and brown to grey mudstones and an upper Bunter Sandstone Formation of dolomitic sandstones with mudstone interlayers.
