= Caprera Canyon =

Submarine canyon off Sardinia, Italy

Coordinates: 41°25′0″N 9°58′0″E

Caprera Canyon is a submarine canyon system in the central-western Tyrrhenian Sea, off north-eastern Sardinia, Italy, east of the Strait of Bonifacio. The canyon system is formed by two winding tributary canyons, each about 16 km long, which join on the lower continental slope at roughly 1,000 m depth before continuing for about 9 km toward the continental rise.

Studies have identified the area as a hotspot for cetacean diversity, with records of several species including striped dolphin, fin whale, Cuvier's beaked whale and sperm whale. Research in the area has included boat-based surveys, environmental DNA sampling, exploration with remotely operated vehicles and analysis of contaminants in zooplankton. The canyon has been discussed as potentially relevant for marine mammal conservation.

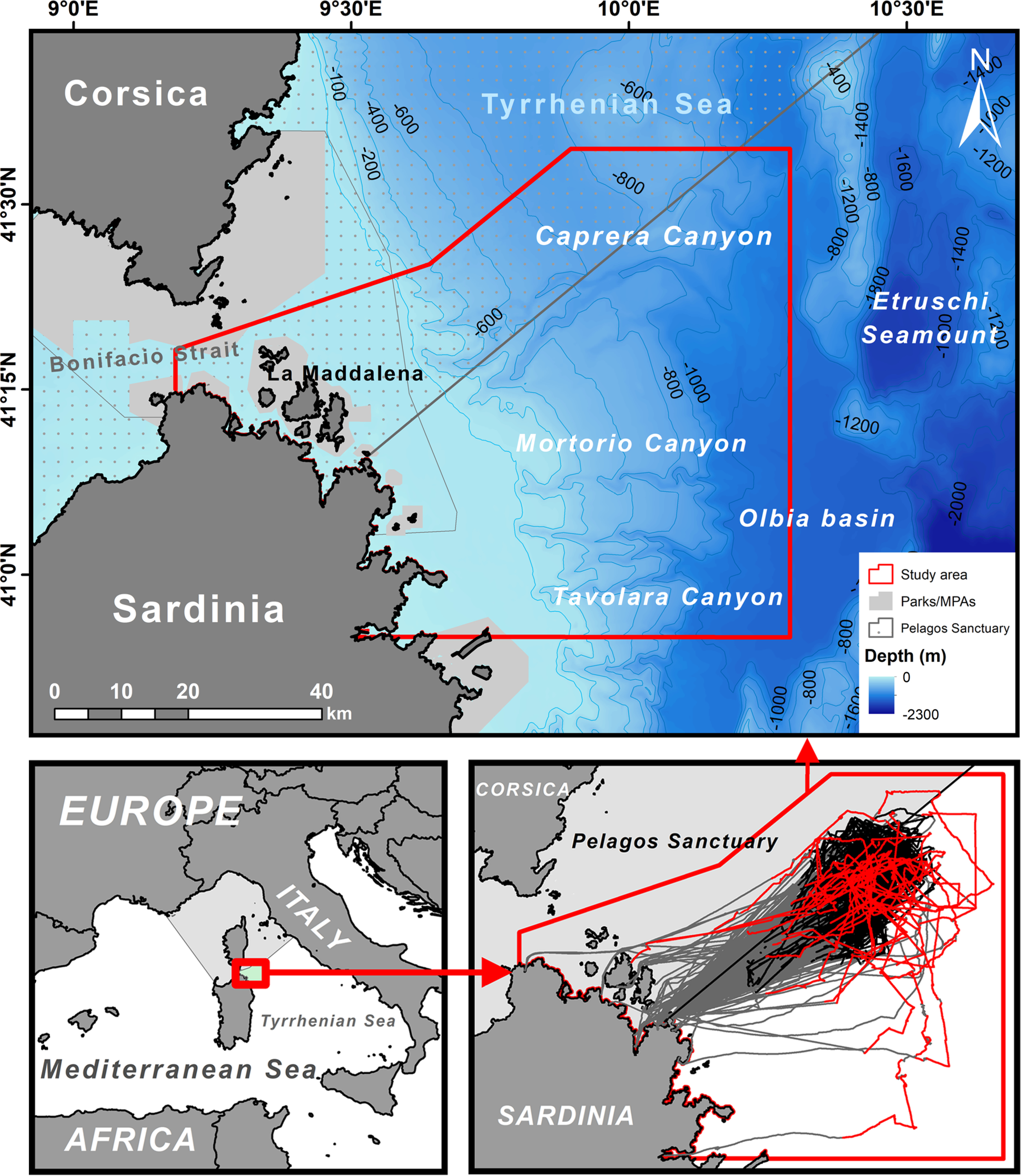
Bathymetric map of the Caprera Canyon, north-eastern Sardinia, Italy

== Geography ==
The Caprera Canyon is a submarine canyon system off north-eastern Sardinia, in the central-western Tyrrhenian Sea, east of the Strait of Bonifacio. The canyon is formed by two winding tributary branches, each about 16 km long, cut into the upper continental slope; these join on the lower slope at around 1,000 m depth into a single channel roughly 2.5 km wide, continuing for a further 9 km toward the continental rise.

The surrounding seabed comprises continental shelf, continental slope, canyons and seamounts; water depths in the area reach about 1,500 m. The shelf extends about 20 km off the north-eastern coast of Sardinia before giving way to a continental slope 17–26 km wide at around 120 m depth.

Several turbidite canyon systems incise the north-eastern Sardinian slope, including the Mortorio and Tavolara canyons, with Caprera described as the major system. Together with the neighbouring Lavezzi Canyon, it is one of the two principal canyon systems on the eastern side of the northern Sardinian margin, both originating on the continental shelf between Sardinia and Corsica and running toward the Tyrrhenian Sea.

== Ecology ==
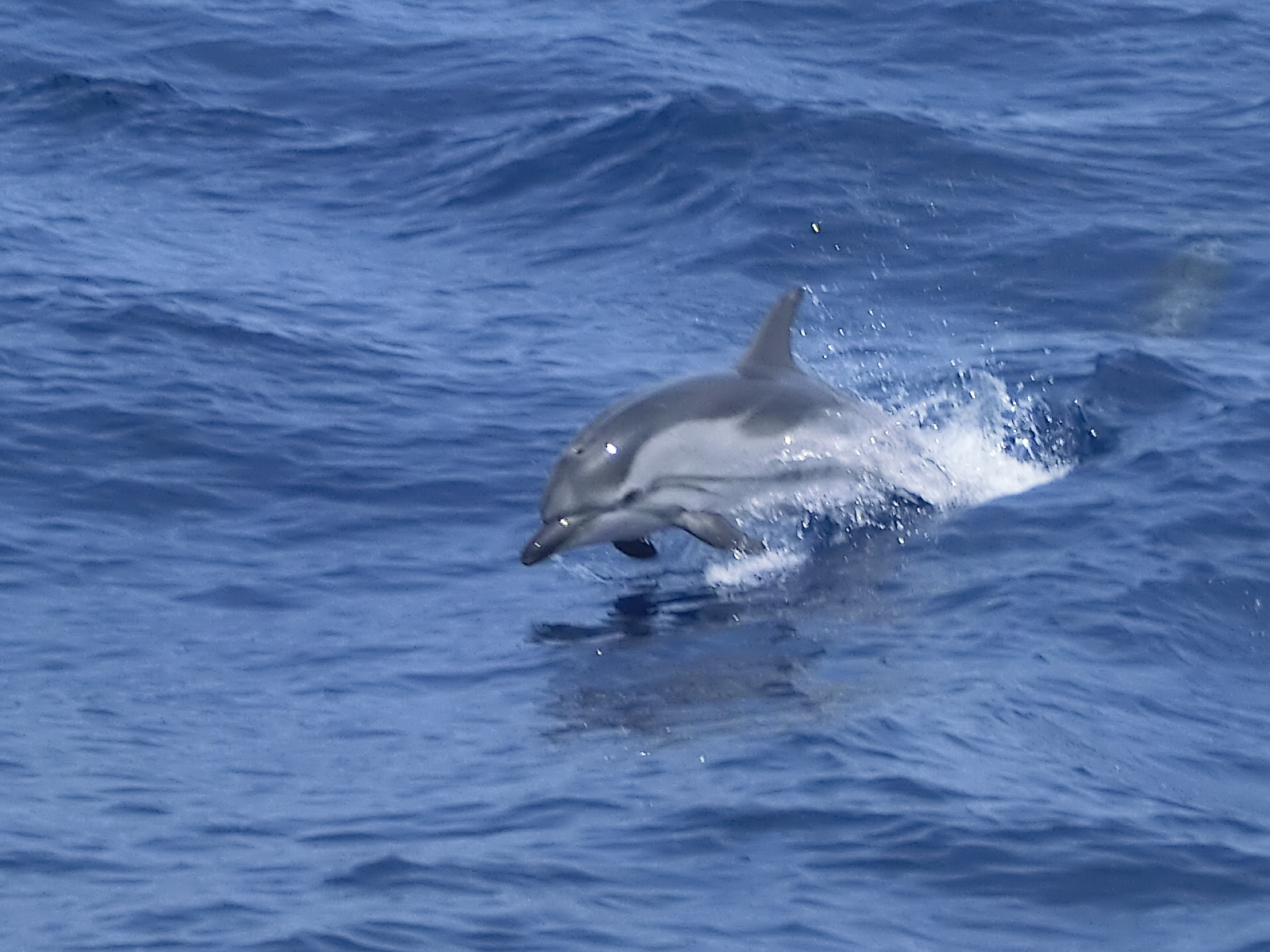
Striped dolphin in the Mediterranean Sea; the species was the most frequently recorded cetacean in surveys of the Caprera Canyon.

Boat-based surveys conducted between 2011 and 2019 identified the Caprera Canyon as a hotspot for cetacean diversity, recording 810 sightings across eight species: striped dolphin, fin whale, Cuvier's beaked whale, sperm whale, Risso's dolphin, common dolphin, bottlenose dolphin and Sowerby's beaked whale. The overall encounter rate was 10.6 sightings per 100 km, higher than in several comparable Mediterranean study areas; Cuvier's beaked whale was notable in particular, with one of the highest encounter rates documented for the species in the Mediterranean. The presence of calves and other behavioural observations suggested that the canyon serves as both a breeding and feeding ground for most of the species recorded.

A Mediterranean-wide analysis also identified the Caprera Canyon system as an area of high encounter rate for Cuvier's beaked whale and as an area where fin whales were sighted.

Environmental DNA studies detected the regular presence of Cuvier's beaked whale in the canyon, especially at depths of 700–1,000 m, and identified the Caprera Canyon as an area frequented by the Mediterranean monk seal.

== Research and conservation ==
In 2025, a One Ocean Foundation expedition used a remotely operated underwater vehicle to survey the canyon at depths from about 130 to 1,050 m, documenting deep-sea habitats alongside signs of human impact such as discarded fishing gear and litter. Reported threats to the area include maritime traffic, fishing activity, bycatch in fishing gear, underwater noise and pollution. A 2025 study found PCBs, DDT residues and trace elements in zooplankton samples from the canyon, and used zooplankton as an indirect indicator of contaminant exposure in filter-feeding species such as fin whale, basking shark and devil ray.

Plastic pollution was also highlighted by the 2019 stranding near Porto Cervo of a pregnant sperm whale reported to have almost 23 kg of plastic waste in its stomach; scientists linked the animal to a group using the nearby Caprera Canyon.

In 2016, the Caprera Canyon was officially selected as an Area of Interest, an initial step toward possible recognition as an Important Marine Mammal Area (IMMA). Bittau et al. noted that IMMA status is not legally binding and does not itself create conservation measures, but argued that the Caprera Canyon and surrounding areas could benefit from such a designation. In March 2024, Mission Blue designated it a Hope Spot, calling for its conservation status to be elevated. As of 2025, CNN reported that the canyon still had no formal protection.
