= Windermere Supergroup =

Chronology of the Windermere supergroup
Groups of the Windermere supergroup against the geological timescale. Axis scale: millions of years ago.

The Windermere Supergroup is a geological unit formed during the Ordovician to Silurian periods ~450 million years ago, and exposed in northwest England, including the Pennines and correlates along its strike, in the Isle of Man and Ireland, and down-dip in the Southern Uplands and Welsh Borderlands. It underlies much of north England's younger cover, extending south to East Anglia. It formed as a foreland basin, in a similar setting to the modern Ganges basin, fronting the continent of Avalonia as the remains of the attached Iapetus Ocean subducted under Laurentia.

The supergroup comprises the Dent Group of turbiditic limestones, and the overlying series of shales, grits and greywackes of the Stockdale Group, Tranearth Group, Coniston Group and Kendal Group. Compression from the south east during the later Acadian orogeny (probably caused by the closure of the Rheic ocean) buckled the strata into anticlines and synclines and caused slaty cleavage in some sediment beds.

== Before the Windermere: Basement terranes ==
To the north west of the unit lies the Cambro-Ordovician Skiddaw Group, a sequence that formed on the Avalonian continental margin, composed mainly of turbidites. Between the two, the Borrowdale Volcanic Group consists of tuffs erupted by an underlying calc-alkaline volcanic arc, active during the subduction of the Iapetus ocean crust.

The Windermere basin was formed by flexure. Prior to its formation, the Southern Uplands accretionary prism, flanking the edge of the Laurentian continent, was advancing towards Avalonia. The load of the mountains formed during this collision weighed down the Avalonian plate, causing the development of accommodation space.

== Sedimentation begins: Filling the basin ==
Sedimentation began in the Caradoc (upper Ordovician, 455 million years ago). During the Llandovery, the Stockdale Supergroup is marked by a number of oxic-anoxic transitions, with black shales corresponding to transgressions - these may have helped to mitigate a runaway greenhouse effect. The rate of sediment accumulation accelerated with time; it held fairly steady at a low ~50 metres per million years (m/Ma) until the Wenlock (mid Silurian, 424 million years ago), when it increased greatly, eventually reaching over 1000 m/Ma when the record is terminated by erosion in the Pridoli (terminal Silurian, 419 million years ago). This sudden upturn in deposition rate is a result of the increasing proximity of the Avalon mountain belt, which started to depress the plate from the Ordovician, but was not close enough to increase the sedimentary input until the Silurian. The latest phase of sedimentation reflected a change in the basin's state. Instead of being underfilled, and trapping all sediment that flowed into it, it became overfilled. This was reflected by a shallowing of water depth, as the basin silted up. This culminated with a transition to terrestrial conditions in the Přídolí.

== Beyond the record: Postulated cover ==
Analysis of the clay mineral illite from a section across the Windermere Supergroup permits an estimate to be made of its maximum burial depth. Deposits at the surface today were once covered with 5–6 km of sediment; some of this would belong to faulted Windermere deposits, but it is postulated that the bulk of it was Old Red Sandstone, including molasse deposits laid down by alluvial fans on the flanks of the mountain belt, and probably lower energy fluvial (river) or aeolian (dune) deposits.

== Modelling the basin's evolution ==
Sinclair's model of foreland basins has remained the state of the art for over a decade, and his four-stage model provides a good match for the Windermere supergroup. In the first stage, an orogenic wedge (here, the mountains of the Southern Uplands accretionary wedge) loads a passive margin, causing flexural subsidence and providing accommodation space. A "forebulge", caused by the rigidity of the crust flexing up behind the load, causes uplift and permits erosion. As the bulge moves backwards, it leaves shallow waters in its wake, which can be filled with carbonates, while hemipelagic sediments and turbidites continue to fill the deeper parts of the basin, leaving a "trinity" of facies --- this is stage 2. At a certain point, the deep water basin changes from an underfilled state, where accommodation space is created as fast as it is filled with flysch, to an overfilled one (stage 3). The orogenic wedge then provides a significant source of molasse sediments, with turbidites and deltas prograding through the basin. The basin is eventually filled, and covered with fluvial and alluvial molasse (stage 4).

== Matching the model ==
Stage 1 is hard to spot in the sedimentary record. The Dent Group, the oldest part of the supergroup, is a good match for the carbonate facies expected in the shallow waters of stages 2–3; accommodation space was created through thermal subsidence. The deeper water deposits of stage three are represented by the Stockdale and Tranearth groups, which display a steady deepening, as expected of sediments deposited in an underfilled basin, with a sedimentation rate high enough to preserve annual variation in places. (This signal is complicated by an overprinted signature of eustatic glaciations.) The end of stage three is represented by the Coniston Group, a series of sandy turbidites, with sediment supply from the north east (and controlled by basement faulting). The group is subdivided into formations, which each represent a turbidite lobe, and are separated by anoxic background sedimentation. The Kendal Group covers the transition into stage four, with pronounced shallowing up; turbidites become thinner-bedded, and anoxic hemipelagics give way to oxygenated sediments, with storm beds becoming more and more common, and intertidal sediments topping the group. The missing Old Red Sandstone mentioned above formed the molasse sediments of stage 4.

Throughout the Silurian, until the beginning of Old Red Sandstone deposition, sedimentation rate increases steadily, reaching a peak of 1 mm a^{−1}.
