= Dent Group =

Group of Upper Ordovician sedimentary and volcanic rocks in north-west England

- Stratigraphic range: Ordovician
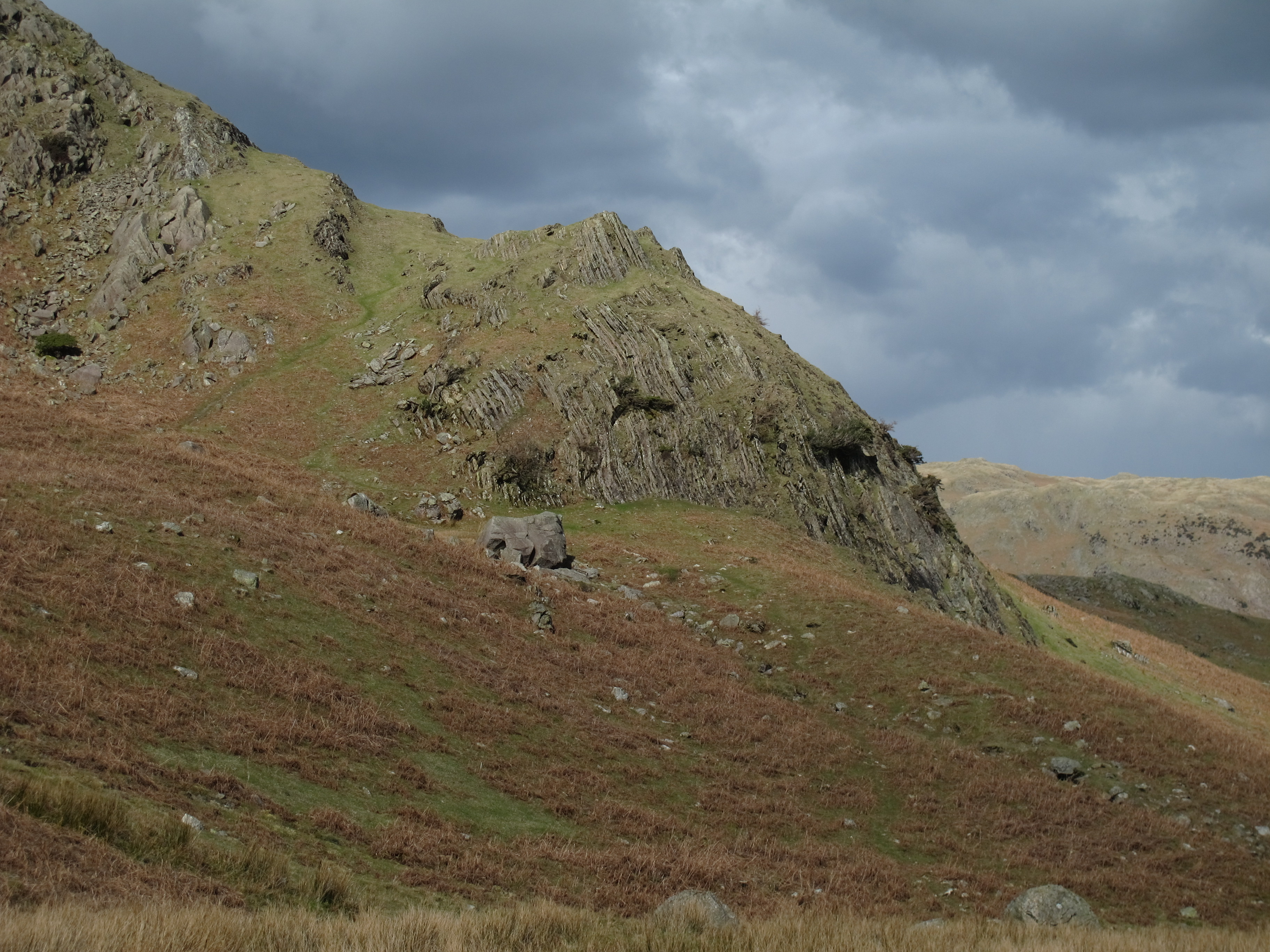
- Steeply-dipping calcareous mudstones of the Dent Group on Timley Knott near Coniston, Cumbria
- Type: Group
- Unit of: Windermere Supergroup
- Underlies: Stockdale Group
- Overlies: Borrowdale Volcanic Group
- Thickness: ca. 100 m (330 ft)

Location
- Region: England
- Country: United Kingdom
- Extent: Southern Lake District, northwest Pennines

The Dent Group is a group of Upper Ordovician sedimentary and volcanic rocks in north-west England. It is the lowermost part of the Windermere Supergroup, which was deposited in the foreland basin formed during the collision between Laurentia and Avalonia. It lies unconformably on the Borrowdale Volcanic Group. This unit was previously known as the Coniston Limestone Group or Coniston Limestone Formation and should not be confused with the significantly younger (uppermost Silurian) Coniston Group.

== Distribution ==
The Dent Group is exposed in four areas, the southern Lake District as a narrow strip across the whole width of the outcrop, in the Cautley and Dent inliers, the Cross Fell inlier and the Craven inliers.

=== Lake District outcrop ===
In the main Lake District outcrop, the group consists of calcareous siltstones and mudstones of the basal Kirkley Bank Formation, micritic limestones of the Broughton Moor Formation and dark blue-gray shales of the Ashgill Formation. Locally volcanic formations are developed, including the Yarlside Volcanic Formation at the base of the Kirkley Bank Formation and the High Haume Tuff and Appletreeworth Formations at the base of the Ashgill Formations.

=== Cautley and Dent inliers ===
In the Cautley and Dent inliers, rocks of the Dent Group occur in two fault bounded strips next to the Dent Fault. In these inliers, calcareous mudstones of the Cautley Mudstone Formation are overlain by the Ashgill Formation. The Cautley Volcanic Member is a unit of volcaniclastic rocks, within the Cautley Mudstone Formation.

=== Cross Fell inlier ===
In the Cross Fell inlier, the basal Dufton Shale Formation is followed by the Swindale Limestone Formation and the Ashgill Formation. In the Keisley area, the uppermost part of the Dent Group is represented by the highly fossiliferous Keisley Limestone Formation, exposed in the core of an anticline.

=== Craven inliers ===
The Craven inliers are found to the north of the North Craven Fault. In these inliers, calcareous siltstones and muddy limestones of the Norber Formation are overlain by siltstones and mudstones of the Sowerthwaite Formation. The Dam House Bridge Tuff Member forms the basal part of the Sowerthwaite Formation.

== Tectonic setting ==
The early Paleozoic geology of northern England records the convergence and eventual collision of the Avalonia microcontinent with the continent of Laurentia. The underlying Borrowdale Volcanic Group formed in an island arc, caused by the southerly subduction of the crust of the now vanished Iapetus Ocean. At the end of active arc volcanism, the area began to subside, allowing deposition of the shallow marine Dent Group. The final closure of Iapetus occurred during the Devonian Acadian orogeny, with the resulting continental collision causing deformation of the Ordovician rocks, including folding, thrusting and cleavage development.

== Depositional environment ==
The Dent Group was deposited in a shallow water environment.

== See also ==
- List of fossiliferous stratigraphic units in England
