= Cumbrian Coast Group =

- Stratigraphic range: Permian
- Type: Group
- Sub-units: St Bees Shale Formation, St Bees Evaporite Formation, Barrowmouth Mudstone Formation, Eden Shales Formation
- Underlies: Sherwood Sandstone Group
- Overlies: Appleby Group

Lithology
- Primary: siltstone
- Other: mudstone, anhydrite, sandstone

Location
- Country: England

Type section
- Named for: coast of Cumbria

The Cumbrian Coast Group is a Permian lithostratigraphic group (a sequence of rock strata) which occurs in the western part of Cumbria in northern England.

== Distribution and stratigraphy ==
The group outcrops near Whitehaven on the Cumbrian coast and beneath the Vale of Eden. It comprises the St Bees Evaporite and the overlying St Bees Shale Formation which are between 0 and 100m and 0 and 215m thick respectively. The lower formation sits atop the mixed lithology breccia known as Brockram. It is also found beneath the Irish Sea where the Barrowmouth Mudstone Formation is the equivalent of the St Bees Shale Formation. The Group can achieve thicknesses in excess of 300m here.
