= Eycott Volcanic Group =

Group of volcanic rock formations in northwestern England

- Stratigraphic range: Ordovician (Llandeilo to Caradoc epochs)
- Type: Group
- Sub-units: Potts Ghyll Formation, Overwater Formation
- Underlies: unconformity
- Overlies: Skiddaw Group
- Thickness: to 3200m

Lithology
- Primary: andesitic lavas and sills
- Other: volcanic breccias, tuffs, sandstone

Location
- Region: Cumbria
- Country: England
- Extent: northern Lake District & Melmerby Fell inlier

Type section
- Named for: Eycott Hill

The Eycott Volcanic Group is a group of volcanic rock formations of Ordovician age (Llandeilo to Caradoc epochs) named after the locality of Eycott Hill in the English Lake District. The group overlies the Skiddaw Group and is unconformably overlain by a variety of different Devonian and Carboniferous age rocks.

This rock sequence has previously been known as the Eycott Group. It consists largely of andesitic lavas and sills with tuffs, breccias and volcaniclastic sandstones. Its main outcrop is in an east-west oriented band of country in the northern part of the Skiddaw range in the northern Lake District stretching from the village of Bothel east to form the hill of Binsey and further east, the more extensive Caldbeck Fells. A smaller outcrop underlies Greystoke Park just to the east of this area and forms Eycott Hill east of Mungrisdale. There is a further inlier at Melmerby Fell in the North Pennines. The outcrops are intensely faulted and in the Caldbeck area are crossed by numerous mineral veins yielding arsenic, barium, copper and lead which have been worked in the past.

== See also ==
- Borrowdale Volcanic Group
