= Haisborough Group =

Triassic lithostratigraphic group beneath the southern part of the North Sea

- Stratigraphic range: Anisian – Norian (Triassic)
- Type: Group
- Underlies: Penarth Group
- Overlies: Bacton Group
- Thickness: up to 900m

Lithology
- Primary: mudstones
- Other: halite, anhydrite

Location
- Region: North Sea
- Country: England

Type section
- Named for: Haisborough Sands
- Named by: Rhys, G.H.

The Haisborough Group is a Triassic lithostratigraphic group (a sequence of rock strata) beneath the southern part of the North Sea . The name is derived from the Haisborough Sands off the coast of Norfolk. The Group is up to 900m thick and comprises red, brown and grey mudstones with beds of halite and anhydrite. It is the offshore equivalent of the Mercia Mudstone Group as recorded in the northeast of England.
