= Pencil cleavage =

Geological phenomenon

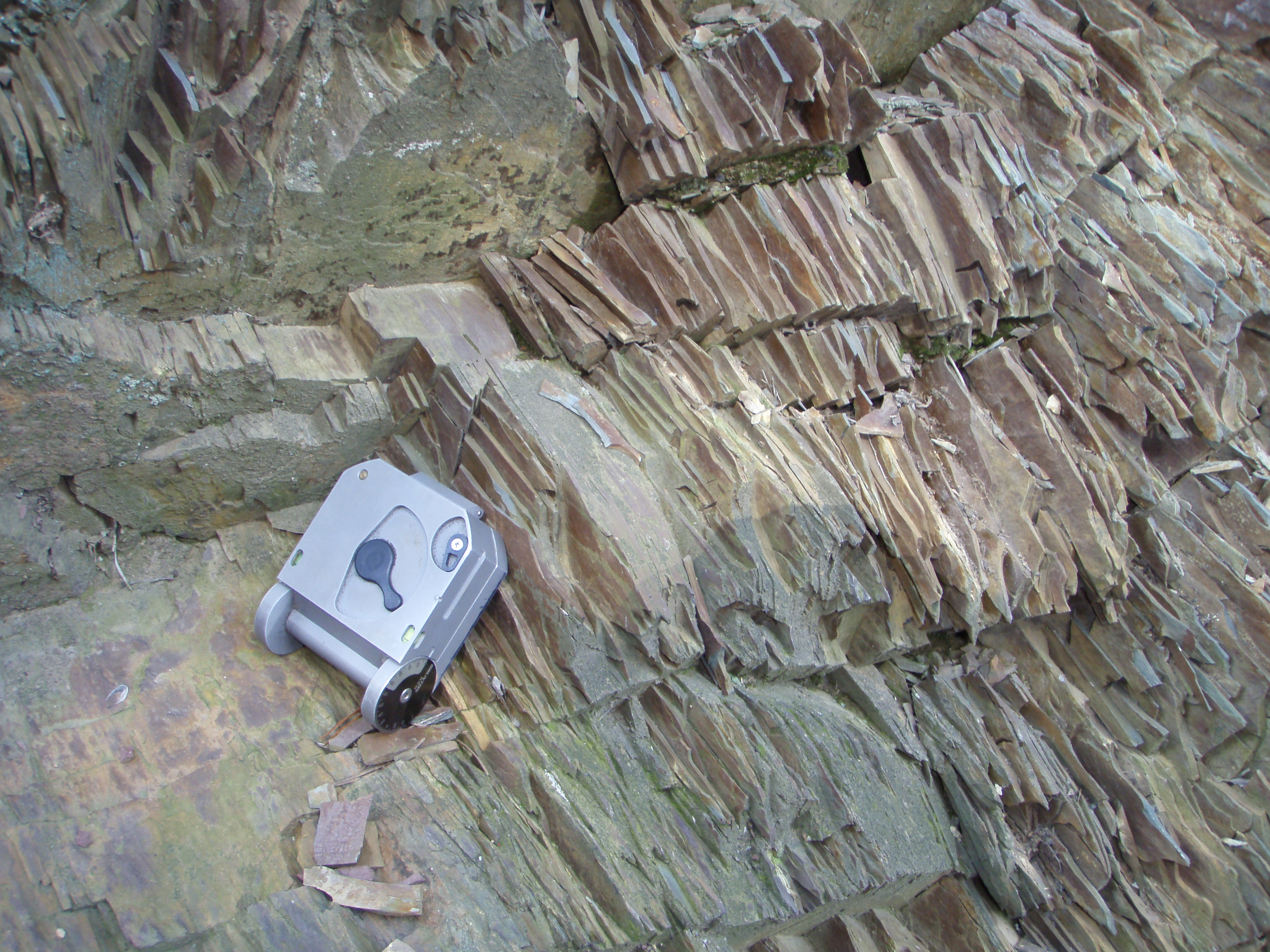
Pencil cleavage in limestone; surveying compass for scale

Pencil cleavage in geology refers to a cleavage in rock such that long, slender, pencil-shaped fragments of rock are created by fracturing during the weathering of a sedimentary rock. Pencil cleavage is usually associated with rock units that contain high angle of intersection between cleavages, such as a diagenetic cleavage and a later tectonic cleavage.
