= Kendal Group =

- Stratigraphic range: Ludlow to Pridoli epochs of Silurian
- Type: Group
- Unit of: Windermere Supergroup
- Sub-units: Bannisdale Formation and Kirkby Moor Flags
- Underlies: unonformity with Devonian and Carboniferous rocks
- Overlies: Coniston Group
- Thickness: possibly in excess of 4200m

Lithology
- Primary: siltstone, mudstone
- Other: turbiditic sandstone

Location
- Region: Northern England
- Country: England
- Extent: southern Lake District and Howgill Fells

Type section
- Named for: Kendal

The Kendal Group is a Silurian lithostratigraphic group (a sequence of rock strata) in the southern Lake District and the Howgill Fells of northern England. The name is derived from the town of Kendal in Cumbria. The Group is included within the Windermere Supergroup. The group comprises couplets of siltstone and mudstone along with some turbiditic sandstones and which may exceed a thickness of 4200m. Its lower unit is the Bannisdale Formation above which is the Kirkby Moor Formation. Some of the rocks of the latter were earlier included in the Underbarrow and Scout Hill Flag formations.
