= Appleby Group =

- Stratigraphic range: Permian
- Type: Group
- Sub-units: Brockram
- Underlies: Cumbrian Coast Group and Roxby Formation
- Overlies: mid-Carboniferous unconformity
- Thickness: variable

Lithology
- Primary: sandstone
- Other: mudstone, breccia

Location
- Region: northwest England
- Country: England

Type section
- Named for: Appleby-in-Westmorland

The Appleby Group is a lithostratigraphical term referring to the succession of Permian Period aeolian and fluviatile rock strata which occur in northwest England and beneath the Irish Sea in the United Kingdom.

The Appleby Group unconformably overlies a variety of older rock strata (Carboniferous). It is succeeded (overlain) by the Cumbrian Coast Group Its lowermost sub-unit is the Brockram, a breccia which sits unconformably on a range of older strata.
