= Tranearth Group =

Geological formation in northern England

- Stratigraphic range: Wenlock epoch of Silurian
- Type: Group
- Unit of: Windermere Supergroup
- Sub-units: Brathay, Birk Riggs and Coldwell formations
- Underlies: Coniston Group
- Overlies: Stockdale Group
- Thickness: 500–1,000 m (1,600–3,300 ft)

Lithology
- Primary: laminated hemipelagite, siltstone
- Other: sandstone, limestone

Location
- Region: Northern England
- Country: England

Type section
- Named for: Tranearth near Torver

The Tranearth Group is a Silurian lithostratigraphic group (a sequence of rock strata) in the southern Lake District and Howgill Fells of the Pennines of northern England. The name is derived from the locality of Tranearth near Torver in Cumbria. The Group is included within the Windermere Supergroup. It comprises laminated hemipelagites and siltstones and some sandstones and limestone which achieve a thickness of between 500 and 1,000 m (1,600 and 3,300 ft). It is divided into a lower Brathay Formation which is overlain by the Birk Riggs Formation (not present in the Howgills) and then by an upper Coldwell Formation.
