= Sherwood Sandstone Group =

Triassic lithostratigraphic group

- Stratigraphic range: Olenekian–Ladinian
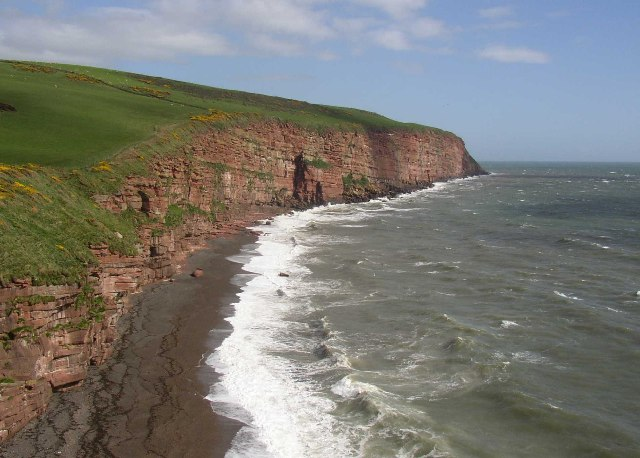
- St Bees Sandstone, St Bees South Head, Cumbria
- Type: Group
- Unit of: New Red Sandstone Supergroup
- Sub-units: Hopwas Breccia Formation, Chester Formation, Wilmslow Sandstone Formation, Helsby Sandstone Formation
- Underlies: Mercia Mudstone Group
- Overlies: Roxby Formation, Cumbrian Coast Group, Aylesbeare Mudstone Group and others
- Thickness: over 2000m

Lithology
- Primary: sandstone
- Other: conglomerate, siltstone, mudstone

Location
- Country: United Kingdom
- Extent: widespread

Type section
- Named for: Sherwood Forest

The Sherwood Sandstone Group is a Triassic lithostratigraphic group (a sequence of rock strata) which is widespread in Britain, especially in the English Midlands. The name is derived from Sherwood Forest in Nottinghamshire which is underlain by rocks of this age. It has economic importance as the reservoir of the Morecambe Bay gas field, the second largest gas field in the UK, and the Wytch Farm oil field in Dorset, the largest onshore oilfield in Western Europe. The rock strata of the group is largely unfossiliferous, though the Otter Sandstone in Devon has provided an important Middle Triassic fauna.

== Geographical extent ==
The Sherwood Sandstone Group is present in a number of sedimentary basins throughout the United Kingdom, where regional subsidence during the Triassic allowed sediments to accumulate and be preserved.

=== Northwest England: the East Irish Sea and Solway Basins ===
The Sherwood Sandstone Group in onshore Northwest England comprises the Cheshire Basin and the eastern edge of the East Irish Sea and Solway Basins. The Sherwood Sandstone Group is found as bedrock in the Vale of Eden, on the coast of Cumbria, in Lancashire and in Cheshire. The Sherwood Sandstone in Cumbria and Lancashire is mostly obscured by superficial deposits, with a notable exception being the cliffs at St Bees Head which are formed in the Chester Formation, the lowermost formation within the group. Cities which are built on the Sherwood Sandstone include Preston, Carlisle, Manchester, Liverpool, and Chester.

Offshore, the Sherwood Sandstone Group is present as bedrock beneath the Irish Sea seabed as far west as the Isle of Anglesey and the Isle of Man. The Sherwood Sandstone also crops out onshore in the northeastern Isle of Man.

=== Northern Ireland and Scotland ===
The Sherwood Sandstone is also found in southern Scotland around Annan. The Sherwood Sandstone in Annan is continuous with the Sherwood Sandstone in Northern Ireland under the North Channel. In Northern Ireland, the Sherwood Sandstone is relatively widespread, though much of the unit is buried beneath younger rocks. The Sherwood Sandstone crops out north and east of Limavady, east of Cookstown, between Dungannon and Armagh and along the Lagan Valley beneath Belfast and Newtownards and on the Antrim coast.

=== Northeast England ===
In northeastern England, the Sherwood Sandstone Group extends in a roughly north-south band running parallel to the Pennines, from Stockton-on-Tees south through York, into Nottinghamshire and then the English Midlands, though is largely concealed by superficial sediments. Offshore in the southern North Sea, the Sherwood Sandstone Group is present under younger rocks, and is the equivalent to the Bunter Sandstone of the Bacton Group.

=== Midlands: Hinkley, Needlewood, Stafford and Knowle Basins ===
The Sherwood Sandstone occurs widely in the Midlands, particularly to the western side of the region in Shropshire and Staffordshire. The cities of Lichfield, as well as west Birmingham and west Wolverhampton, are built on the Sherwood Sandstone.

=== Southern England: Worcester and Wessex Basins ===
Southwards, the Sherwood Sandstone is continuously present beneath Worcestershire, Gloucestershire, Wiltshire and Hampshire, and beyond there through Somerset, Dorset and Devon, however outcrops are very limited and it is largely buried under younger sedimentary rocks. The only substantial outcrop in this area is the cliff section from Budleigh Salterton to Ladram Bay and Sidmouth on the coast of East Devon.

== Cheshire Basin rock succession ==
The sequence is most thickly developed in the Cheshire Basin, which also extends into north Shropshire. It comprises the following formations:

=== Helsby Sandstone Formation ===
The Helsby Sandstone Formation (named from the Cheshire village of Helsby where the type section is exposed at Helsby Hill) comprises around 250m thickness of sandstone with conglomerate and siltstone which occurs across the Cheshire Basin. Older literature includes it as part of the Lower Keuper Sandstone. It is often divided into an upper Frodsham Member and a lower Delamere Member. Faulted blocks of these rocks are largely responsible for the prominent west facing escarpment of the Mid Cheshire Ridge and the Helsby Sandstone is exposed in numerous localities here, southwards from Runcorn through Helsby and Frodsham to Utkinton, spectacularly at the outlier of Beeston Castle hill and lastly within the Peckforton Hills. Further outcrops occur on the Wirral Peninsula, on Thurstaston Common and the Hilbre Islands.

=== Wilmslow Sandstone Formation ===
The Wilmslow Sandstone Formation (named from the town of Wilmslow in Cheshire) comprises up to 900m thickness of early Triassic sandstones with occasional siltstones. It was earlier known as the Upper Mottled Sandstone. In Wirral, the 60m thick Thurstaston Sandstone Member and the 2m thick Thurstaston Hard Sandstone Bed are distinguished at the top of the sequence.

=== Chester Formation ===
The Chester Formation (named from the city of Chester) comprises sandstones with some conglomerates and siltstones of early Triassic age. It ranges from less than 90m to over 220m in thickness. It has been known in the past as the Bunter Pebble Beds and the Chester Pebble Beds Formation. There are a couple of reference sections for this sequence in the vicinity of Chester.

=== Kinnerton Sandstone Formation ===
The Kinnerton Sandstone Formation (named from the twin villages of Higher and Lower Kinnerton on the England/Wales border west of Chester) is a sequence which ranges from 0m to over 150m thickness of largely aeolian sandstones of early Triassic age. It was formerly known as the Lower Mottled Sandstone.

== English Midlands rock succession ==
=== Helsby Sandstone Formation ===
Once known locally as the Bromsgrove Sandstone Formation (from the town of Bromsgrove in Worcestershire), the Helsby Sandstone Formation is early Triassic to Anisian in age and comprises variously coloured sandstones whose bases are frequently conglomeratic, together with mudstones and siltstones. The thickness of the formation is variable but reaches around 500m in the Worcester area. It is often encountered in older literature as the Lower Keuper Sandstone. The formation includes the Shepshed Sandstone Member.

=== Wildmoor Sandstone Formation ===
The Wildmoor Sandstone Formation (named from the Worcestershire locality of Wildmoor, north of Bromsgrove) is a 0 - 284m thick sequence of sandstones formerly known as the Upper Mottled Sandstone or Wildmoor Beds. It also includes some mudstones and siltstones.

=== Kidderminster Formation ===
The Kidderminster Formation (named from the Worcestershire town of Kidderminster) is a 0 - 200m thick sequence of conglomerates and sandstones previously known as either the Bunter Pebble Beds or the Kidderminster Conglomerate Formation.

=== Chester Formation ===
Formerly known locally as the Polesworth Formation (from the Warwickshire village of Polesworth), the Chester Formation here is of ?Olenekian to Anisian age.

=== Moira Formation ===
The Moira Formation (named from the Leicestershire village of Moira) is of Induan/Olenekian age. Also encountered as the Hopwas or Moira Breccia.

=== Lenton Sandstone Formation ===
The Lenton Sandstone Formation (named from the Nottingham suburb of Lenton) is of Induan/Olenekian age.

== Stafford Basin rock succession ==
The Stafford Basin includes the Kibbleston Formation (named from the Staffordshire locality of Kibbleston) which is underlain by the Wildmoor Formation which is in turn underlain by the Kidderminster Formation.

== Needwood Basin rock succession ==
The rock succession in the Needwood Basin includes the Hollington Formation (named from the Staffordshire locality of Hollington) which is underlain by the Hawksmoor Formation (named from the Staffordshire locality of Hawksmoor) which includes the Hulme Member, a conglomerate and which is in turn underlain by the Huntley Formation (named from the Staffordshire locality of Huntley). They are all of Scythian age.

== Cumbria rock succession ==
On the Cumbrian coast the Group comprises the Calder Sandstone Formation and the underlying St Bees Sandstone Formation. The former is around 500m thick and includes sandstones of both aeolian and fluviatile origin. The latter is between 400 and 600m thick and includes some siltstone and claystone beds. It overlies the varied lithologies of the Permian age Cumbrian Coastal Group. The Kirklinton Sandstone Formation in places overlies the Calder Sandstone Formation in the Carlisle and Vale of Eden basins of north and east Cumbria. A sandstone which underlies Sellafield and Drigg is known as the Sellafield Member and is assigned to the Helsby Sandstone Formation.

== Southwest England rock succession ==
The group is represented in Somerset and east Devon by the Otterton Sandstone and the underlying Budleigh Salterton Pebble Beds formations.
