= Roxby Formation =

Geological formation in eastern England

- Stratigraphic range: Guadalupian-Early Triassic
- Type: Group
- Underlies: Sherwood Sandstone Group
- Overlies: Appleby Group
- Thickness: up to 1,025 metres (3,360 ft)

Lithology
- Primary: Mudstone and siltstone, reddish brown, with subordinate sandstone.

Location
- Region: England
- Country: United Kingdom
- Extent: east England

Type section
- Named for: Roxby, North Yorkshire

The Roxby Formation, previously known as the Permian Upper Marls, is a formation from the Guadalupian-Early Triassic of eastern England (formation dies out at Nottinghamshire). The formation is made up largely of mudstone and siltstone, reddish brown, with subordinate sandstone.
