= Skiddaw Group =

Geological group of sedimentary rock formations

- Stratigraphic range: Late Cambrian-Mid-Ordovician
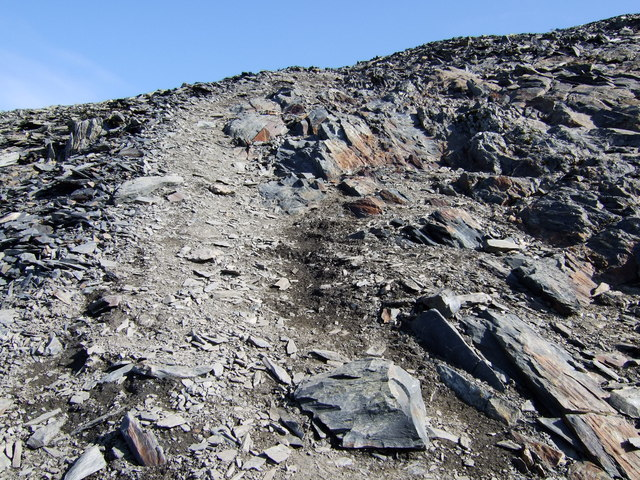
- Slates of the Kirk Stile Formation, exposed just below Skiddaw summit ridge
- Type: Group
- Sub-units: Bitter Beck, Watch Hill, Hope Beck, Loweswater, Kirk Stile, Catterpallot, Buttermere, Tarn Moor, Murton & Kirkland Formations
- Underlies: Borrowdale Volcanic Group, Eycott Volcanic Group
- Overlies: not observed
- Thickness: ~5,000 m (16,000 ft)

Lithology
- Primary: Mudstone
- Other: Siltstone, sandstone

Location
- Coordinates: 54.7°N 3.1°W
- Approximate paleocoordinates: 61.5°S 16.1°W
- Region: Cumbria
- Country: England, United Kingdom
- Extent: northern Lake District, Black Combe & Cross Fell

Type section
- Named for: Skiddaw

The Skiddaw Group is a group of sedimentary rock formations named after the mountain Skiddaw in the English Lake District. The rocks are almost wholly Ordovician in age (Tremadoc through Arenig to Llanvirn epochs) though the lowermost beds are possibly of Cambrian age. This rock sequence has previously been known as the Skiddaw Slates, the Skiddaw Slates Group and the Skiddavian Series. Its base is not exposed but in its main outcrop area, it is considered to be in excess of 5,000 metres (16,000 ft) thick though less elsewhere. It consists largely of mudstones and siltstones with subordinate wacke-type sandstones. Their main occurrence is within the northern and central fells of the Lake District, either side of the major ENE-WSW aligned Causey Pike Fault, but inliers are found at Black Combe in the south of the Lake District and at Cross Fell in the North Pennines.

== Stratigraphy ==
In the Northern Fells of the Lake District, the Skiddaw Group comprises five formations of which the earliest/lowest is the Bitter Beck Formation. This is succeeded by the Watch Hill Formation, then the Hope Beck, Loweswater and Kirk Stile Formations in ascending order. The inlier at Cross Fell comprises just the Catterpallot Formation, a wacke sandstone which is the rough equivalent of the Watch Hill Formation, itself a wacke sandstone as is the Loweswater Formation.

Within the Central Fells are the Buttermere Formation and the overlying Tarn Moor Formation. These are matched by the Murton Formation (grey slates and thin sandstones) and the Kirkland Formation (mudstones with tuffs and lavas) at Cross Fell. The Buttermere Formation is interpreted as an olistostrome. The Tarn Moor and Kirkland Formations contain some volcaniclastic rocks. The inlier to the south at Black Combe contains the wackes of the Knott Hill Formation.

The group underlies the Borrowdale Volcanic Group in the southern and central Lake District and the Eycott Volcanic Group in the northern part of the district.

The Kirkland Formation has provided fossils of Dichograptus octobrachiatus and Heminectere rushtoni.

== Metamorphism ==
The sequence was affected by low-grade regional metamorphism and deformation associated with the Acadian Orogeny, causing the dominant fine-grained parts of the sequence to become slates. The resulting slaty cleavage is parallel to the axial plane of regional folds.
