= Mid-Carboniferous unconformity =

- Stratigraphic range: Namurian, Carboniferous, c.326–313 Ma
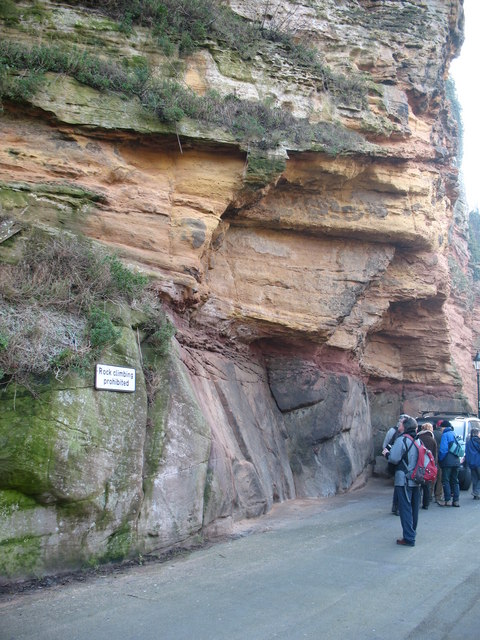
- Crags below Knaresborough Castle. There is an unconformity between mid-Carboniferous sandstones at the road level and late Permian grits and limestones above.
- Type: Geological formation
- Underlies: Mississippian-aged rocks
- Overlies: Pennsylvanian-aged rocks

Lithology
- Primary: Sandstone
- Other: Conglomerate

The Mid-Carboniferous unconformity is an unconformity located in many countries, such as England (Namurian), Thailand, The United States and more. It has been dated to the Namurian, Middle Carboniferous (c.326-313 Ma) and the formation is often noted as being similar to the mid-Carboniferous eustatic event.
