= Continental rise =

Underwater feature connecting the continental slope and the abyssal plain

Cross Section of Continental Margin

The continental rise is a low-relief zone of accumulated sediments that lies between the continental slope and the abyssal plain. It is a major part of the continental margin, covering around 10% of the ocean floor.

== Formation ==
This geologic structure results from deposition of sediments, mainly due to mass wasting, the gravity-driven downhill motion of sand and other sediments. Mass wasting can occur gradually, with sediments accumulating discontinuously, or in large, sudden events. Large mass wasting occurrences are often triggered by sudden events such as earthquakes or oversteepening of the continental slope. More gradual accumulation of sediments occurs when hemipelagic sediments suspended in the ocean slowly settle to the ocean basin.

== Slope ==
Because the continental rise lies below the continental slope and is formed from sediment deposition, it has a very gentle slope, usually ranging from 1:50 to 1:500. As the continental rise extends seaward, the layers of sediment thin, and the rise merges with the abyssal plain, typically forming a slope of around 1:1000.

== Accompanying structures ==
=== Alluvial fans ===
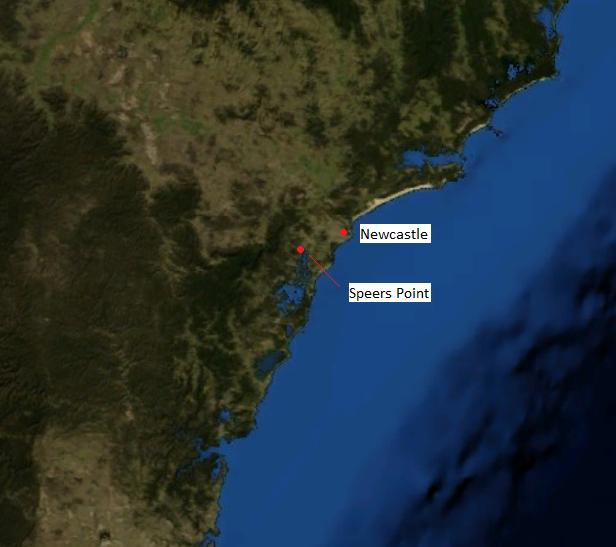
The continental rise of Australia, which is proximate to the coasts of Newcastle and Sydney (bottom left)

Deposition of sediments at the mouth of submarine canyons may form enormous fan-shaped accumulations called submarine fans on both the continental slope and continental rise. Alluvial or sedimentary fans are shallow cone-shaped reliefs at the base of the continental slope that merge together, forming the continental rise.

Erosional submarine canyons slopes downward and leads to alluvial fan valleys with increasing depth. It is in this zone that sediment is deposited, forming the continental rise. Alluvial fans such as the Bengal Fan, which stretches 3,000 kilometers (1,900 miles), make up one of the largest sedimentary structures in the world. Many alluvial fans also contain critical oil and natural gas reservoirs, making them key points for the collection of seismic data.

=== Abyssal plain ===
Beyond the continental rise stretches the abyssal plain, which lies on top of basaltic oceanic crust and spans the majority of the seafloor. The abyssal plain hosts life forms which are uniquely adapted to survival in its cold, high pressure, and dark conditions. The flatness of the abyssal plain is interrupted by massive underwater mountain chains near the tectonic boundaries of Earth's plates. The sediments are mostly silt and clay.
