= Volcano tectonics =

Volcano tectonics is a scientific field that uses the techniques and methods of structural geology, tectonics, and physics to analyse and interpret physical processes and the associated deformation in volcanic areas, at any scale.

These processes may be 1) magma-induced or, conversely, 2) control magma propagation and emplacement. In the first case, the process has a local extent, usually within the volcanic area. Typical examples include the development of calderas and resurgences, pit craters, dikes, sills, laccoliths, magma chambers, eruptive fissures, volcanic rift zones and any type of volcano flank dynamics, including sector collapses. In the second case, the process controlling the magma may have a regional extent, also outside the volcanic area. Typical examples include the activity of regional faults and earthquakes along divergent, convergent and transform plate boundaries, as continental, transitional and oceanic rifts, magmatic arcs and back-arcs, as well as of any intraplate structure possibly controlling volcanism. The study of these processes is not restricted to the Earth's crust. In fact, an increasing number of studies has been considering also the Volcano-Tectonic features of extraterrestrial bodies, including Venus, Mars and Jupiter's moon Io.

As a volcano consists, in the broadest sense, of a volcanic edifice, a plumbing system and a deeper magma reservoir, Volcano-Tectonics is not restricted to the surface processes, but also includes any subsurface process in the host rock related to the shallower and deeper plumbing system of the volcano. The latter may be directly accessible in the eroded portions of active volcanoes or, more commonly, in extinct eroded volcanoes.

The general aim of Volcano-Tectonics is to capture the shallower and deeper structure of volcanoes, establishing the overall stress-strain relationships between the magma and the host rock, to ultimately understand how volcanoes work in their regional context. This approach allows defining the dynamic behaviour of active volcanoes during unrest periods and eruptions and thus being able to make reliable forecasts as to the likely scenarios.

Volcano-Tectonics merges the knowledge and expertise of a wide range of methodologies. These primarily include structural geology (usually at the outcrop scale), tectonics (usually at the regional scale), geodesy from active volcanoes (GPS, InSAR, levelling, strainmeters, tiltmeters), geophysics (seismicity, gravity, seismic lines), remote sensing (optical and thermal), and modelling (analytical, numerical and analogue models). More volcanological-oriented methodologies are also involved, including stratigraphy, petrology, geochemistry and geochronology.

Data, however, are of little use if they cannot be interpreted and understood within the framework of a reasonable model or theory of volcano behaviour. Quantitative and testable models must, in the end, be related to some physical theories and thus to physics. In Volcano-Tectonics, like in solid-earth geophysics in general, the main physical theories used are those that derive from continuum mechanics. For solid-earth sciences, these are mainly solid mechanics, including rock mechanics, fracture mechanics and general tectonophysics, and fluid mechanics, including fluid transport in rock fractures.

== Bibliography ==
- Acocella, Valerio (December 2007). "Understanding caldera structure and development: An overview of analogue models compared to natural calderas". Earth-Science Reviews. 85 (3–4): 125–160. Bibcode:2007ESRv...85..125A. doi:10.1016/j.earscirev.2007.08.004.
- Acocella V., 2014. Structural control on magmatism along divergent and convergent plate boundaries: overview, model, problems. Earth-Science Reviews, 136, 226–288.
- Acocella V., 2021. Volcano-Tectonic Processes. Springer, 567 pp., ISBN 978-3-030-65968-4, https://doi.org/10.1007/978-3-030-65968-4.
- Battaglia M., Roberts C., Segall P., Magma intrusion beneath Long Valley Caldera confirmed by temporal changes in gravity. Science, 285, 2119–2122.
- Borgia A, Ferrari L., Pasquarè G., 1992. Importance of gravitational spreading in the tectonic and volcanic evolution of Mt. Etna. Nature, 357, 231-235
- Chadwick, W.W., Howard, K.A., 1991. The pattern of circumferential and radial eruptive fissures on the volcanoes of Fernandina and Isabela islands, Galapagos. Bull. Volcanol., 53, 259–275.
- Dzurisin D., 2003. A comprehensive approach to monitoring volcano deformation as a window on the eruption cycle. Reviews of Geophysics, 41, 1-29.
- Dzurisin D., 2006. Volcano Deformation. New Geodetic Monitoring Techniques. Springer, 441 pp.
- Fiske, R.S., Jackson, E.D., 1972. Orientation and growth of Hawaiian volcanic rifts. Proc. R. Soc. London, 329, 299–326.
- Gudmundsson A., Acocella V., De Natale G., 2005. The Tectonics and Physics of Volcanoes. Preface. Journal of Volcanology and Geothermal Research, 144, 1–5.
- Gudmundsson, A., 2006. How local stresses control magma-chamber ruptures, dyke injections, and eruptions in composite volcanoes. Earth-Science Reviews, 79, 1-31.
- Gudmundsson A., 2011. Rock fractures in geological processes. Cambridge University, 592 pp.
- Gudmundsson, A. 2020. Volcanotectonics: Understanding the Structure, Deformation and Dynamics of Volcanoes. Cambridge: Cambridge University Press. doi:10.1017/9781139176217.
- Lipman, P.W., 1997. Subsidence of ash-flow calderas: relation to caldera size and magma-chamber geometry. Bull. Volcanol., 59, 198–218.
- Merle, O., Borgia, A., 1996. Scaled experiments of volcanic spreading. J. Geophys. Res., 101, 13805–13817.
- Nakamura, K., 1977. Volcanoes as possible indicators of tectonic stress orientation: principle and proposal. Journal of Volcanology and Geothermal Research, 2, 1-16.
- Newhall, C.G., Dzurisin, D., 1988. Historical unrest at large calderas of the world. U.S. Geological Survey, 1109 pp..
- Pollard, D.D., Delaney D.T., Duffield W.A., Endo E.T., Okamura A.T., 1983. Surface deformation in volcanic rift zones. Tectonophysics, 94, 541–584.
- Rubin, A.M., Pollard, D.D., 1988. Dike-induced faulting in rift zones of Iceland and Afar. Geology, 16, 413–417.
- Segall, Paul (2010). Earthquake and volcano deformation. Princeton, N.J.: Princeton University Press. ISBN 9780691133027.
- Sigmundsson, F., 2006. Iceland geodynamics: crustal deformation and divergent plate tectonics. Springer 209 pp.
- Tibaldi A., 1995. Morphology of pyroclastic cones and tectonics. J. Geophys. Res., 100, 24521–24535.
- Van Wyk deVries B., Francis, P.W. 1997. Catastrophic collapses at stratovolcanoes induced by gradual volcano spreading. Nature, 387, 387–390.
- Walter, T.R., Amelung, F., 2006. Volcanic eruptions following M≥9 megathrust earthquakes: implications for the Sumatra-Andaman volcanoes. Geology, 35, 539–542.
