= Stockdale Group =

Geological group in northern England

- Stratigraphic range: Llandovery epoch of Silurian
- Type: Group
- Unit of: Windermere Supergroup
- Sub-units: Skelgill and Browgill formations
- Underlies: Tranearth Group
- Overlies: Dent Group
- Thickness: up to 120m

Lithology
- Primary: mudstone, siltstone

Location
- Region: Northern England
- Country: England
- Extent: southern Lake District and Pennine inliers

Type section
- Named for: Stockdale in Longsleddale

The Stockdale Group is a Silurian lithostratigraphic group (a sequence of rock strata) in the southern Lake District and Howgill Fells of the Pennines of northern England. The name is derived from the locality of Stockdale near the top of Longsleddale in Cumbria. It is included within the Windermere Supergroup. The rocks of the Group have also previously been referred to as the Stockdale Shales or Stockdale Subgroup. The group comprises limestones and oolites and some sandstones and shales which reach a maximum thickness of 120m in the area. It is divided into a lower Skelgill Formation which is overlain by an upper Browgill Formation.
