= Borrowdale Volcanic Group =

- Stratigraphic range: Caradocian (late Ordovician)
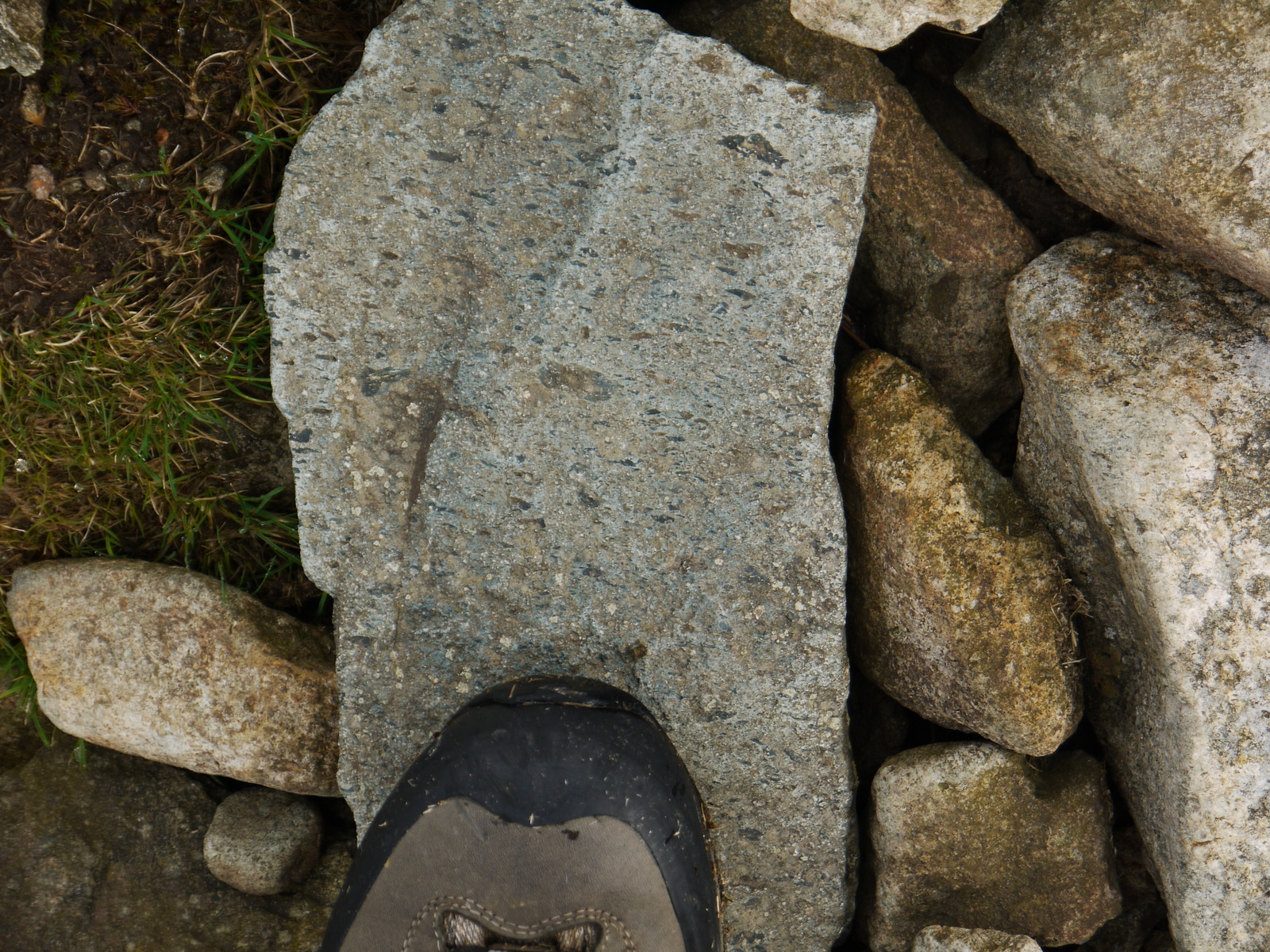
- Lapilli tuff of the Helvellyn Tuff Formation on High Crag
- Type: Group
- Sub-units: Birker Fell Andesite Formation, Whorneyside Tuff Formation, Airy's Bridge Tuff Formation, Lingwell Tuff Formation, Seathwaite Fell Sandstone Formation, Lincomb Tarns Tuff Formation, Esk Pike Formation, Tarn Hows Tuff Formation
- Underlies: Windermere Supergroup
- Overlies: Skiddaw Group
- Thickness: probably up to 6000m

Lithology
- Primary: volcanic rocks
- Other: siltstone, sandstone

Location
- Region: Cumbria
- Country: England
- Extent: Central Lake District & Cross Fell

Type section
- Named for: Borrowdale

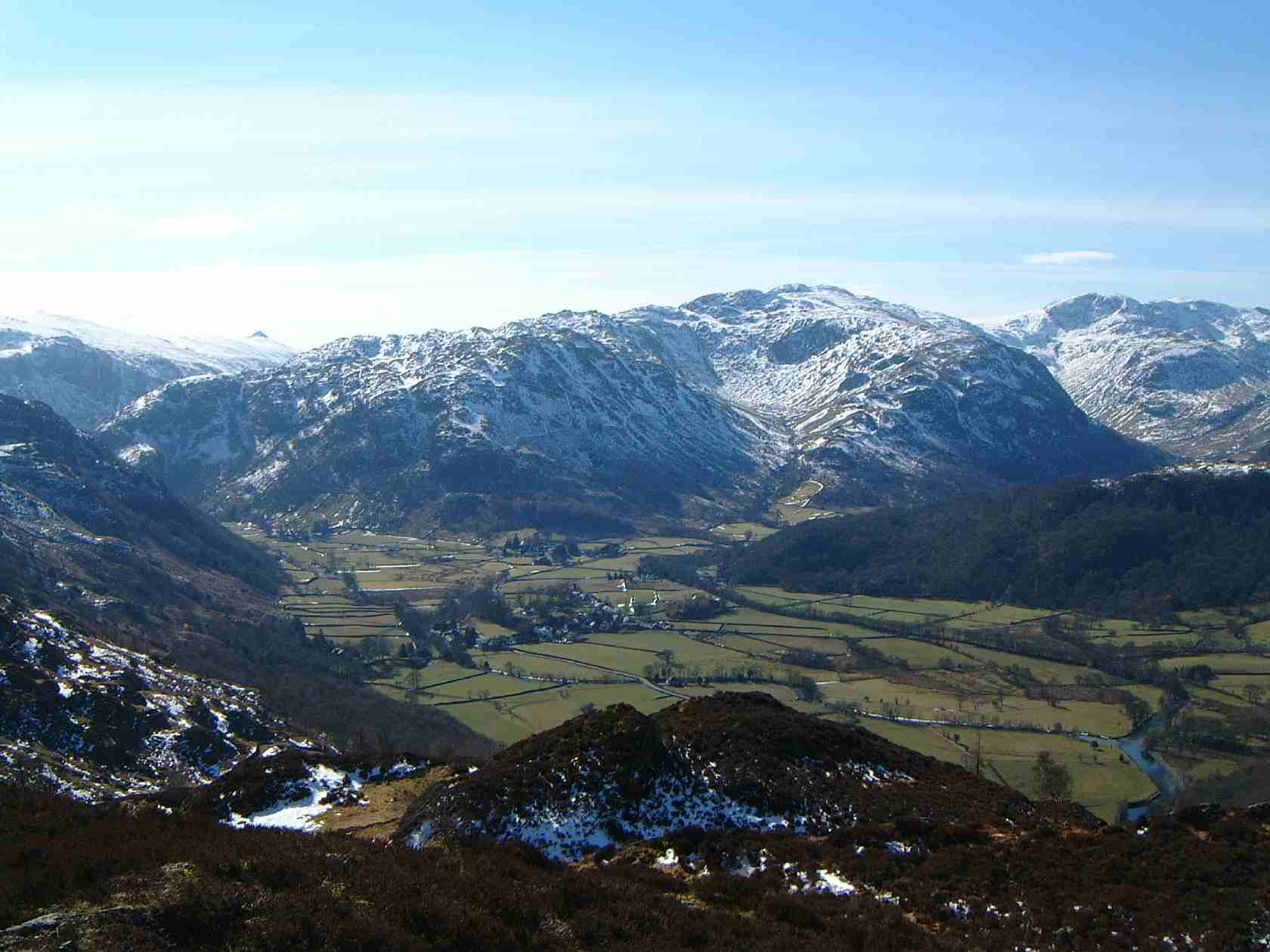
Fells formed of the volcanics around Borrowdale

The Borrowdale Volcanic Group is a group of igneous rock formations named after the Borrowdale area of the Lake District, in England. They are Caradocian (late Ordovician) in age (roughly 450 million years old). It is thought that they represent the remains of a volcanic island arc, approximately similar to the island arcs of the west Pacific today. This developed as oceanic crust to the (present) north-west and was forced by crustal movement under a continental land-mass to the present south-east. Such forcing under, as two plates meet, is termed subduction. This land-mass has been named Avalonia by geologists. It is now incorporated into England and Wales and a sliver of North America.

== Geology ==
At that time the rocks that now comprise most of Scotland (and part of the northern Irish landmass) were not attached to Avalonia. They were separated by an ocean, called the Iapetus Ocean by geologists. The line of joining, or suture, is approximately under the Solway Firth and Cheviot Hills. In the Lake District, the junction between the early Ordovician series, Skiddaw Slate, and the Borrowdale Volcanic that was forced under it, can be seen on the slopes of Fleetwith Pike.

In the English Lake District, the Borrowdale Volcanic Group is composed of lavas (mainly andesites), tuffs and agglomerates, along with some major igneous intrusions. These rocks of the Borrowdale Volcanic Group give rise to dramatic scenery. The mountainous nature of the area, its high rainfall and the relative impermeability of the rock give rise to a high risk of storm flooding as demonstrated by the 2009 flooding of Cockermouth.

Volcanic activity lasted in the region until, at earliest, the Burrellian period (± 455 MYA).

== Boundaries ==
The upper boundary of the group is an unconformity with the overlying Windermere Supergroup. The lower boundary is an unconformity with the underlying Skiddaw Group.

== Significance ==
The outcrop of this sequence on Crinkle Crags (and other surrounding peaks in the Lake District), was chosen as one of the top 100 geosites in the United Kingdom by the Geological Society of London.

== See also ==
- Eycott Volcanic Group
