= Brockram =

Type of rock present in Northern England

Brockram is a type of rock found in northern England. It is a basal breccia of cemented limestone and sandstone fragments dating from the Permian period, forming part of the Appleby Group.

Brockram outcrops in the Whitehaven and Workington district (Geological survey of Gt. Britain sheet 28). Saltom Bay gives a good exposure of it. Along the coast (Saltom Bay to St. Bees ) its thickness varies from 0.75m to 20.5m. Inland boreholes have revealed its thickness to be up to 121m.

Brockram has been used as a building material in Kirkby Stephen and the rest of the Vale of Eden where it has also been quarried for lime burning. It is visible also beside a river bed under a bridge on the edge of Kirkby Stephen.
