= Coniston Group =

Geological group in north-west England

- Stratigraphic range: Gorstian age of Silurian
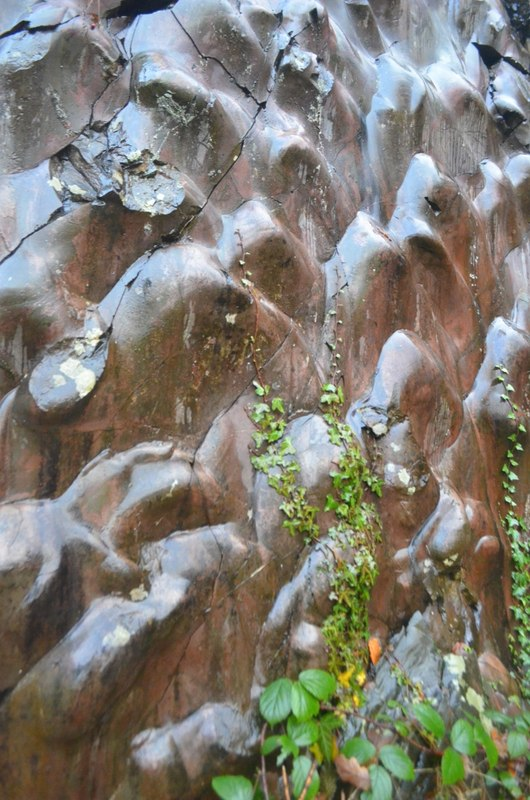
- Flute casts in the base of a vertically-tilted layer of sandstone belonging to the Gawthwaite Formation of the Coniston Group near Broughton in Furness
- Type: Group
- Unit of: Windermere Supergroup
- Sub-units: Yewbank, Moorhow, Poolscar, Latrigg and Gawthwaite formations
- Underlies: Bannisdale Formation of Kendal Group
- Overlies: Wray Castle Formation of Tranearth Group
- Thickness: 1400-1900m

Lithology
- Primary: sandstone, siltstone, laminated hemipelagite

Location
- Region: Northern England
- Country: England
- Extent: southern Lake District and north-west Pennines

Type section
- Named for: Coniston

The Coniston Group is a Silurian lithostratigraphic group (a sequence of rock strata) in the southern Lake District and north-west Pennines of northern England. The name is derived from the small town of Coniston in Cumbria. The rocks of the Group have also previously been referred to as the Coniston Grits or Coniston Grits Formation and Coniston Subgroup. The group comprises sandstones and siltstones and some laminated hemipelagites which achieve a thickness of between 1400 and 1900m. Overlain by the Bannisdale Formation of the Kendal Group and underlain by the Wray Castle Formation of the Tranearth Group, it is divided into several formations. These are, in ascending order (oldest first): Wray Castle, Gawthwaite, Latrigg, Poolscar, Moorhow (or Moorhowe) and Yewbank.
