= Hemipelagic sediment =

Hemipelagic sediment, or hemipelagite, is a type of marine sediment that consists of clay and silt-sized grains that are terrigenous and some biogenic material derived from the landmass nearest the deposits or from organisms living in the water. Hemipelagic sediments are deposited on continental shelves and continental rises, and differ from pelagic sediment compositionally. Pelagic sediment is composed of primarily biogenic material from organisms living in the water column or on the seafloor and contains little to no terrigenous material. Terrigenous material includes minerals from the lithosphere like feldspar or quartz. Volcanism on land, wind blown sediments as well as particulates discharged from rivers can contribute to Hemipelagic deposits. These deposits can be used to qualify climatic changes and identify changes in sediment provenances.

== Deposition ==
Hemipelagic sediment dispersal is mainly controlled by fluvial discharge. Dispersal rate is influenced by sea-level variations which change the proximity of river mouths to oceanic basins and by oceanographic phenomena like currents. Sea-level variations are caused by the earth's natural oscillation between glacial and interglacial periods. For example, a low average sea level would occur during a glacial period as more water is held in ice caps. In addition, underwater landslides called turbidity currents can transport hemipelagic sediment from the continental slope to the continental rise and form a turbidite sequence.

Typically, hemipelagic sediment is transported to the continental slope in suspension from river mouths but can be transported by the wind. The rate of deposition of hemipelagic sediment is higher than pelagic sediment but still quite slow. Ordinarily hemipelagic sediments accumulate too rapidly to react chemically with seawater. In most cases, individual grains thus retain characteristics imparted to them in the area where they formed.

== Composition ==
Hemipelagic sediments can be made of a diverse range of elements or mineral types. The composition of Hemipelagic sediment directly depends on the composition of the adjacent land mass and geologic events such as volcanism that influence sediment input into the ocean. Hemipelagic sediments are mainly terrigenous but can also have biological oozes from marine organisms like Radiolarians or Diatoms. Radiolarians are a species of zooplankton that produce silica tests, or shells and Diatoms are photosynthetic organisms that live in the sunlit region of the ocean. Both organisms are visible in the sedimentary rock record. For example, in the Galice Formation in Oregon the hemipelagic sequence was composed of slaty radiolarian argillite with radiolarian chert present as well. The argillite in the Galice Formation was composed of radiolarians, terrigenous and tuffaceous detritus, and hydrothermal sediment.
