= Cleavage (geology) =

Planar fabric in rock

Different ways in which a cleavage can develop in a sedimentary rock. A: original sedimentary rock; B: pencil cleavage; C: diagenetic foliation (parallel to bedding); D: slaty cleavage.

Cleavage, in structural geology and petrology, describes a type of planar rock feature that develops as a result of deformation and metamorphism. The degree of deformation and metamorphism along with rock type determines the kind of cleavage feature that develops. Generally, these structures are formed in fine grained rocks composed of minerals affected by pressure solution.

Cleavage is a type of rock foliation, a fabric element that describes the way planar features develop in a rock. Foliation is separated into two groups: primary and secondary. Primary deals with igneous and sedimentary rocks, while secondary deals with rocks that undergo metamorphism as a result of deformation. Cleavage is a type of secondary foliation associated with fine grained rocks. For coarser grained rocks, schistosity is used to describe secondary foliation.

There are a variety of definitions for cleavage, which may cause confusion and debate. The terminology used in this article is based largely on Passchier and Trouw (2005). They state that cleavage is a type of secondary foliation in fine grained rocks characterized by planar fabric elements that form in a preferred orientation. Some authors choose to use cleavage when describing any form of secondary foliation.

== Types of cleavage ==
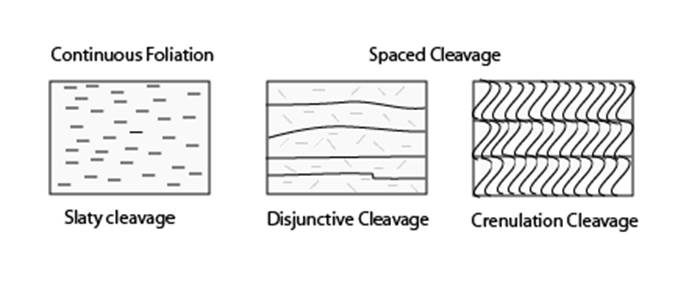
Schematic drawing of continuous and spaced cleavage

The presence of fabric elements such as preferred orientation of platy or elongate minerals, compositional layering, grain size variations, etc. determines what type of cleavage forms. Cleavage is categorized as either continuous or spaced.

=== Continuous cleavage ===
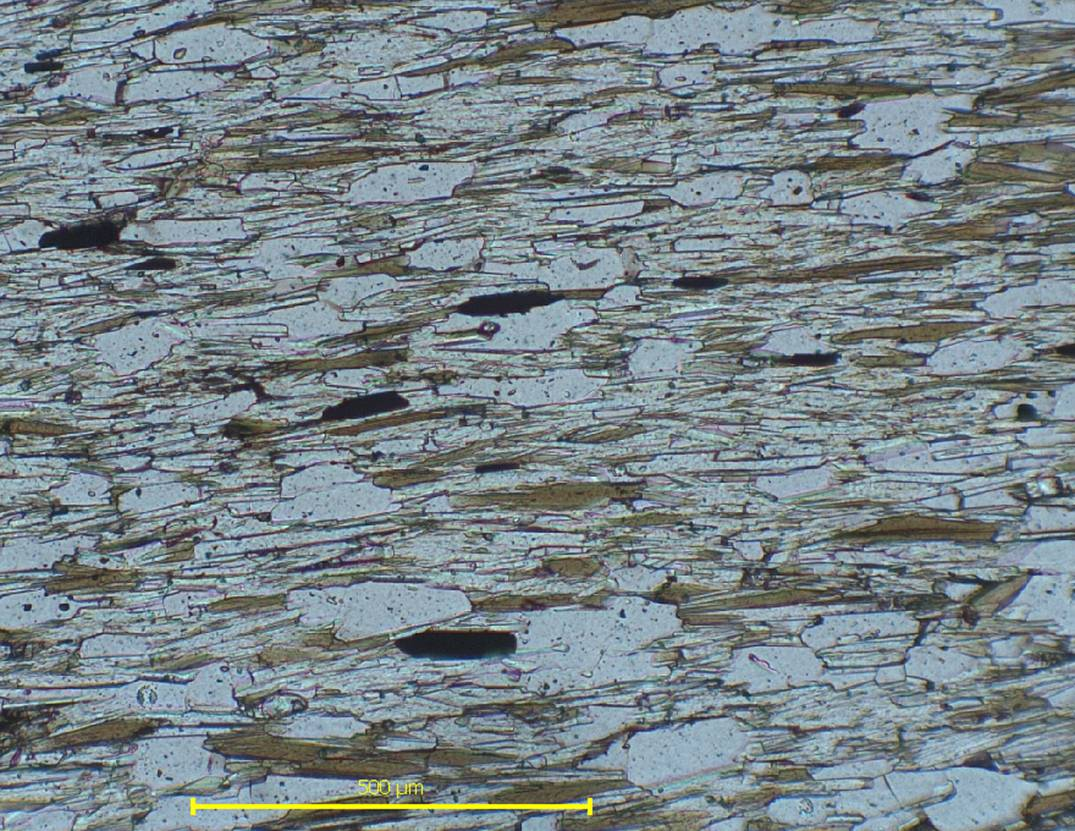
Metamorphosed shale depicting slaty cleavage. Note the grains of mica, quartz, and ilmenite aligned with a preferred orientation.

Continuous or penetrative cleavage describes fine grained rocks consisting of platy minerals evenly distributed in a preferred orientation. The type of continuous cleavage that forms depends on the minerals present. Undeformed platy minerals such as micas and amphiboles align in a preferred orientation, and minerals such as quartz or calcite deform into a grain shape preferred orientation. Continuous cleavage is scale dependent, so a rock with a continuous cleavage on a microscopic level could show signs of spaced cleavage when observed on a macroscopic level.

=== Slaty cleavage ===
Since the nature of cleavage is dependent on scale, slaty cleavage is defined as having 0.01 mm or less of space occurring between layers. Slaty cleavage often occurs after diagenesis and is the first cleavage feature to form after deformation begins. The tectonic strain must be enough to allow a new strong foliation to form, i.e. slaty cleavage.

=== Spaced cleavage ===
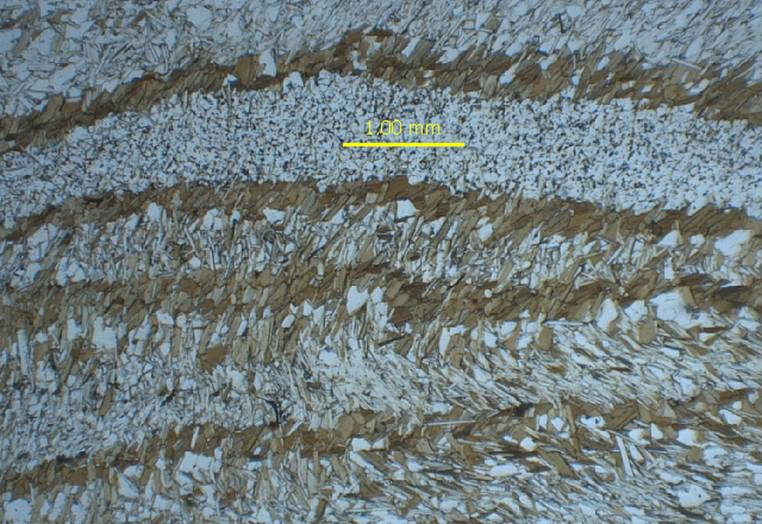
A thin section depicting spaced cleavage. The cleavage domains are darker biotite grains, and the microlithons between consist of mostly muscovite and quartz. The grains in the microlithons are starting to align in a preferred orientation. A new foliation overprinted an old, showing the beginning signs of a crenulation cleavage.

Spaced cleavage occurs in rocks with minerals that are not evenly distributed, and as a result the rock forms discontinuous layers or lenses of different types of minerals. Spaced cleavage contains two types of domains; cleavage domains and microlithons. Cleavage domains are planar boundaries subparallel to the trend of the domain, and microlithons are bounded by the cleavage domains. Spaced cleavages can be categorized based on whether the grains inside the microlithons are randomly oriented or contain microfolds from a previous foliation fabric. Other descriptions for spaced cleavages include the spacing size, the shape and percentage of cleavage domains, and the transition between cleavage domains and microlithons.

=== Crenulation cleavage ===
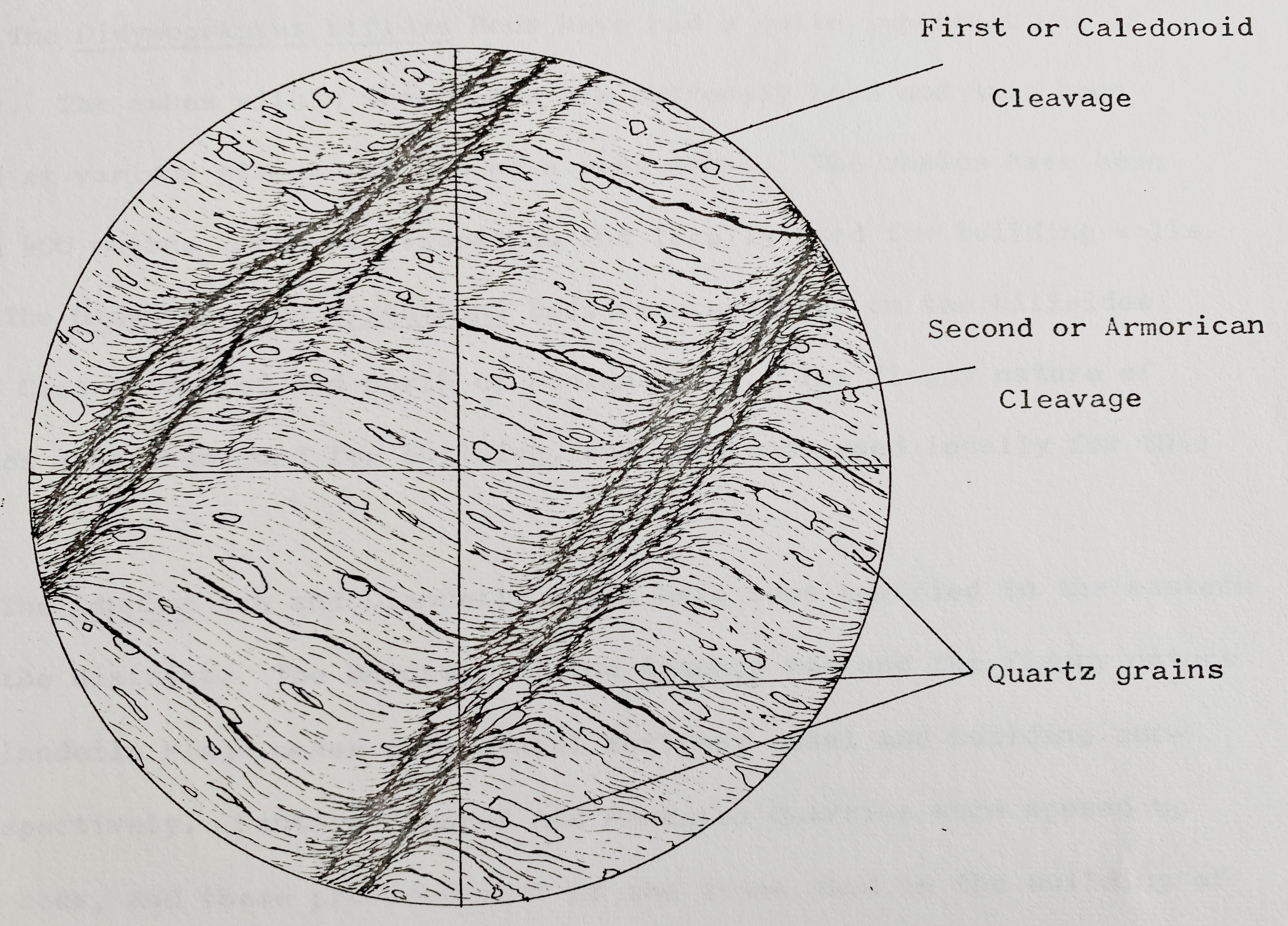
Petrographic thin section showing Crenulation Cleavage within the late Middle Ordovician (Llandeilian Stage) Hendre Shales Formation (Drefach Group) in a roadside exposure [Grid Ref: SN 2883 2053] along the B4299 Meidrim road heading south towards St Clears, Carmarthenshire, Wales. A first (Caledonoid) and second (Armorican) cleavage are identified. Field of view = 1 cm diam.

Crenulation cleavage contains microlithons that were warped by a previous foliation. Folding occurs when there are multiple phases of deformation, the latter one causes symmetric or asymmetric microfolds that deform previous foliations. The type of crenulation cleavage pattern that forms depends on lithology and degree of deformation and metamorphism.

=== Disjunctive cleavage ===
Disjunctive cleavage describes a type of spaced cleavage where the microlithons are not deformed into microfolds, and formation is independent from any previous foliation present in the rock. A common outdated term for disjunctive cleavage is fracture cleavage. It is recommended that this term be avoided because of the tendency to misinterpret the formation of a cleavage feature.

=== Transposition cleavage ===
When an older cleavage foliation is erased and replaced by a younger foliation due to stronger deformation and is evidence for multiple deformation events.

== Formation ==
The development of cleavage foliation involves a combination of various mechanisms dependent on the rock's composition, tectonic processes, and metamorphic conditions. The magnitude and orientation of stress coupled with pressure and temperature conditions determine how a mineral is deformed. Cleavages form approximately parallel to the X-Y plane of tectonic strain and are categorized based on the type of strain. The mechanisms currently believed to control cleavage formation are rotation of mineral grains, solution transfer, dynamic recrystallization, and static recrystallization.

=== Mechanical rotation of grains ===
During ductile deformation, mineral grains with a high aspect ratio are likely to rotate so that their mean orientation is in the same direction as the XY plane of finite strain. Mineral grains may fold if oriented perpendicular to shortening direction.

=== Solution transfer ===
Cleavage foliations may result due to stress-induced solution transfer by the redistribution of inequant mineral grains by pressure solution and recrystallization. This would also help to increase rotation of elongate and tabular mineral grains. Mica grains undergoing solution transfer will align in a preferred orientation. If the mineral's grains affected by pressure solution are deformed through plastic crystal processes, the grain will be extended along the XY-plane of finite strain. This process shapes grains into a preferred orientation.

=== Dynamic recrystallization ===
Dynamic recrystallization occurs when a rock undergoes metamorphic conditions and reequilibrium of a mineral's chemical composition. This happens when there is a decrease in free energy stored in deformed grains. Deformed micas can store a sufficient amount of strain energy that can allow recrystallization to occur. This process allows oriented regrowth of both old and new minerals into the damaged crystal lattice during cleavage development.

=== Static recrystallization ===
This process occurs either after deformation or in the absence of dynamic deformation. Depending on the intensity of heat during recrystallization, the foliation will either be strengthened or weakened. If the heat is too intense, foliation will be weakened due to the nucleation and growth of new randomly oriented crystals and the rock will become a hornfels. If minimal heat is applied to a rock with a preexisting foliation and without a change in mineral assemblage, the cleavage will be strengthened by growth of micas parallel to foliation.

== Relationship to folds ==
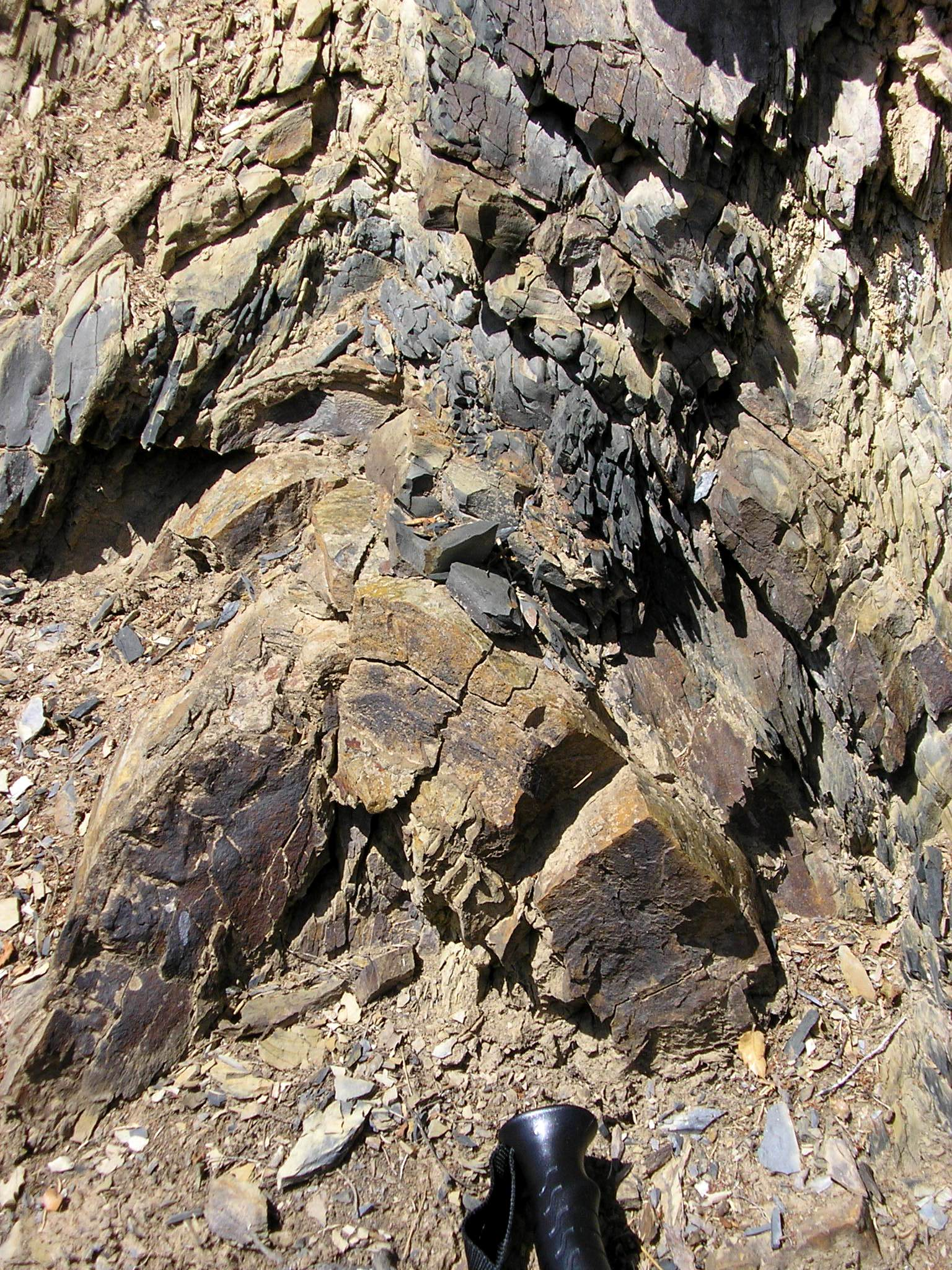
Anticline in sandstone shale sequences with axial planar cleavage, refraction of cleavage visible on right-hand limb

Cleavages display a measurable geometric relationship with the axial plane of folds developed during deformation and are referred to as axial planar foliations. The foliations are symmetrically arranged with respect to the axial plane, depending on the composition and competency of a rock. For example, when mixed sandstone and mudstone sequences are folded during very-low to low grade metamorphism, cleavage forms parallel to the fold axial plane, particularly in the clay-rich parts of the sequence. In folded alternations of sandstone and mudstone the cleavage has a fan-like arrangement, divergent in the mudstone layers and convergent in the sandstones. This is thought to be because the folding is controlled by buckling of the stronger sandstone beds with the weaker mudstones deforming to fill the intervening gaps. The result is a feature referred to as foliation fanning.

== Engineering considerations ==
In geotechnical engineering a cleavage plane forms a discontinuity that may have a large influence on the mechanical behavior (strength, deformation, etc.) of rock masses in, for example, tunnel, foundation, or slope construction.

== See also ==
- Cleavage (crystal)
- Dynamic quartz recrystallization
