= Geology of the Czech Republic =

The geology of the Czech Republic is very tectonically complex, split between the Western Carpathian Mountains and the Bohemian Massif.

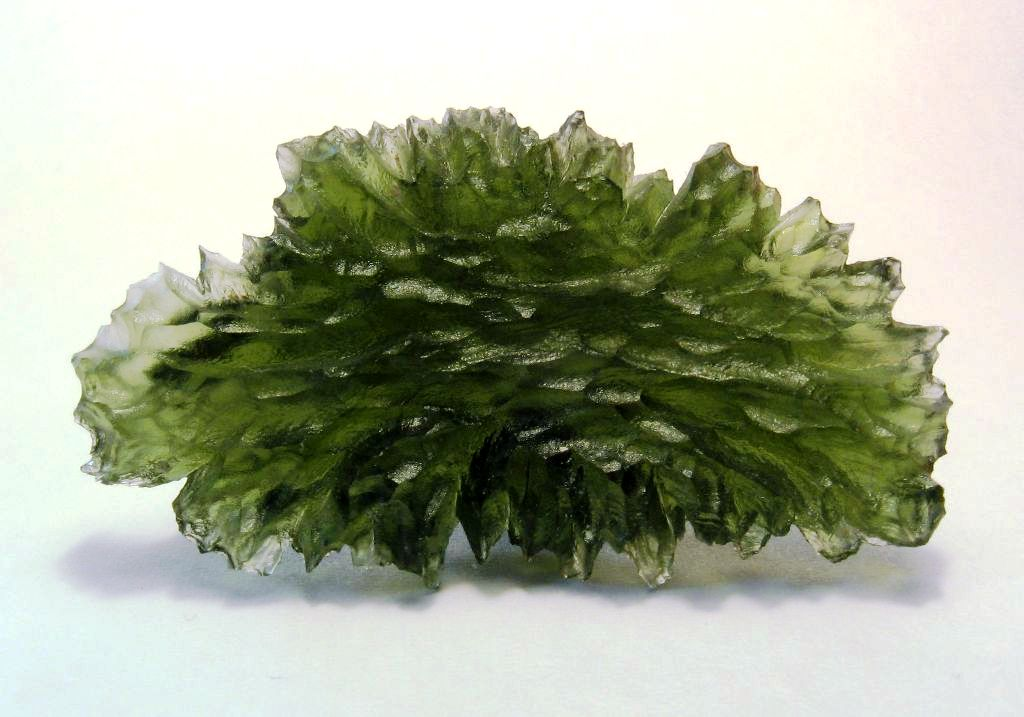
Moldavite from Besednice

== Geologic history ==
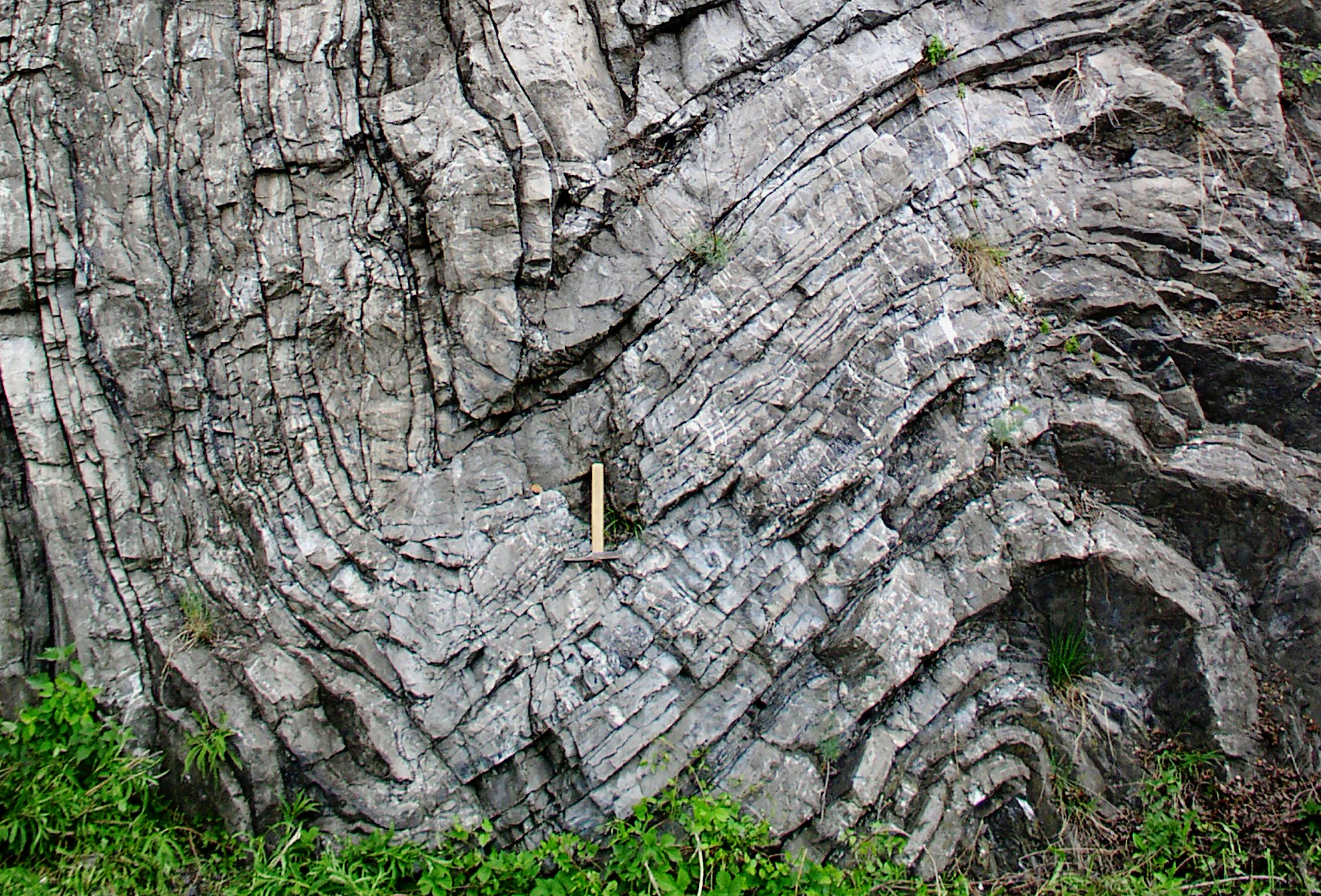
Folded layers of limestone, of Devonian age, in Prague (hammer for scale)

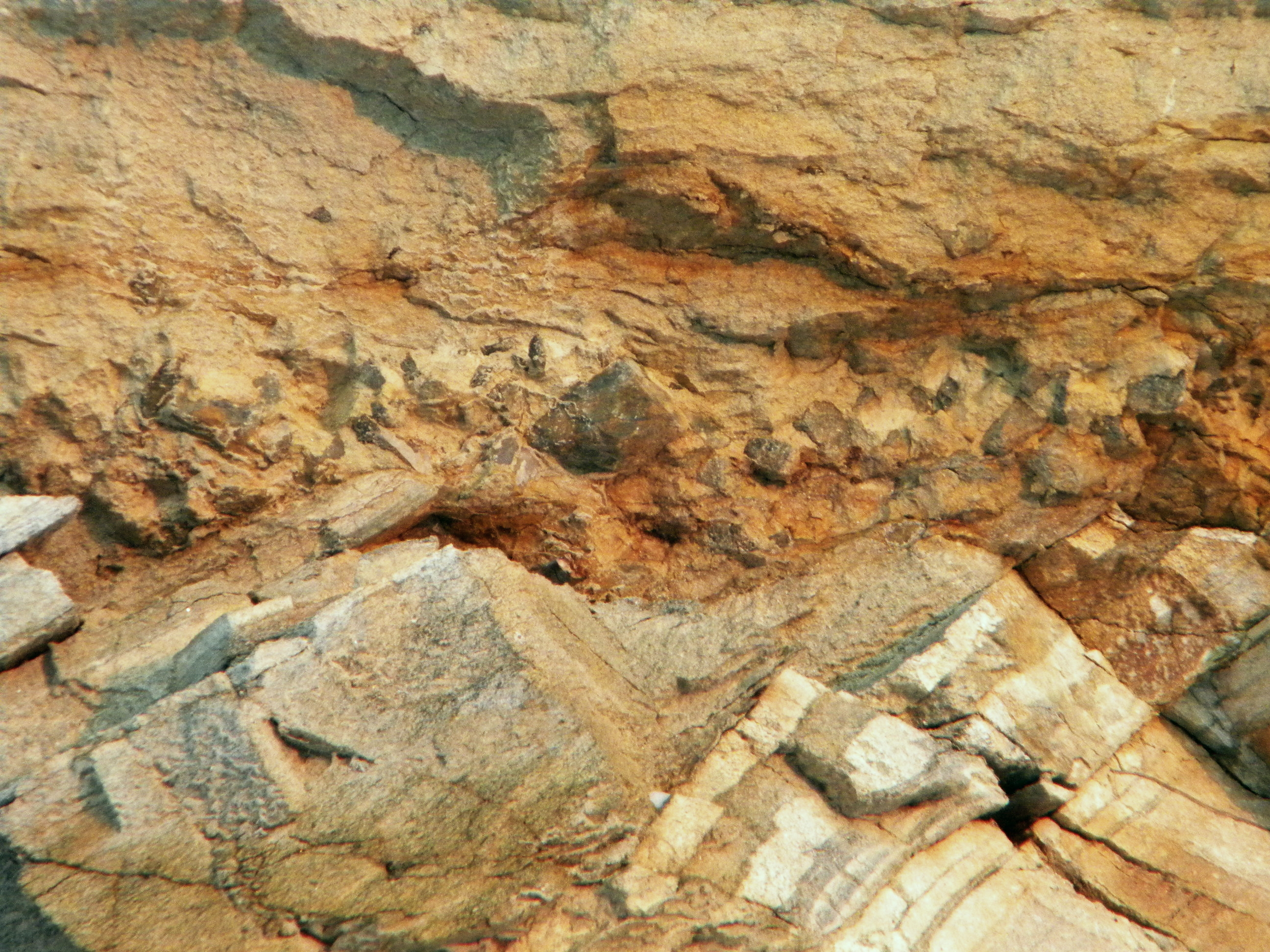
Unconformity between Precambrian gneiss (below) and Cretaceous conglomerate and sandstone (above) at Kutna Hora

The geologic development of the territory of the Czech Republic was influenced by the cratonization of the Bohemian Massif at the end of the Permian with simultaneous orogenic activation of the Carpathian basement.

The oldest elements of the Bohemian Massif remain poorly understood because of their allochthonous position in Pan-African and Variscan units. The Světlík orthogneiss in southern Bohemia is 2.1 billion years old and the Dobra granite gneiss is 1.37 billion years old. Together, they may be the oldest elements of the Bohemian Massif. The Světlík orthogneiss occurring between the Monotonous and Varied groups of the Moldanubian Zone might correspond to Gondwana-derived terrane (the Penteverian crust formed 2.1 billion years ago). The age of the Dobra Gneiss suggests its possible origin as Laurentia or Baltica.

The Pan-African orogenic belt formed 800-570 million years ago between Laurentia and Gondwana as well as microcontinent segments. The belt can be traced to the Bohemian Massif. For instance, Precambrian metamorphic rocks (formed the 580 to 550 million years ago) act as a footwall of early Cambrian conglomerates in the Lugian Pluton; the 660 to 520 million year old Ma Brno pluton is similar. Cadomian, Pan-African 600 million year old overprinting on zircons is found in many parts of Europe.

In addition to debates about the Pan-African orogeny, the Caledonian orogeny in the Bohemian Massif is poorly understood. In the Saxothuringian Zone and in the major part of the Lugian domain, there is no break at the Silurian-Devonian boundary. Sedimentary deposition began in the early Cambrian and elsewhere in the Ordovician and ended by the mid-Carboniferous orogeny 330 to 320 million years ago. The few indications of the Silurian/Devonian hiatus in the northern part of the Lugian domain are not of regional significance. Older ages of the amphibolite (ophiolite) complex of the Marinaska Lazne (486 Ma) point to an early Ordovician extension and c. 500 Ma granite gneisses of the Lugian domain early Ordovician magmatic activity, However, these ages have to be considered as minimum ones.

In the Brunovistulian terrane, the transgression of early Devonian conglomerates on the pre-Devonian or more precisely the Pan-African basement speaks favorably of its geotectonic independence on W units of the Bohemian Massif.

At the time of oceanic subduction of the Rhenohercynian Zone below the Saxothuringian Zone, areas of the Bohemian Massif were reworked. Moldanubian Zone rocks experienced very intensive reconstruction, producing mantle-crust interaction granulite and eclogite facies rocks. Nappe and shear tectonics appeared the Moldanubian Zone as it was joined with the Moravosilesicum and Brunovistulian to other segments of the Bohemian Massif.

=== Mesozoic-Cenozoic (251 million years ago-present) ===
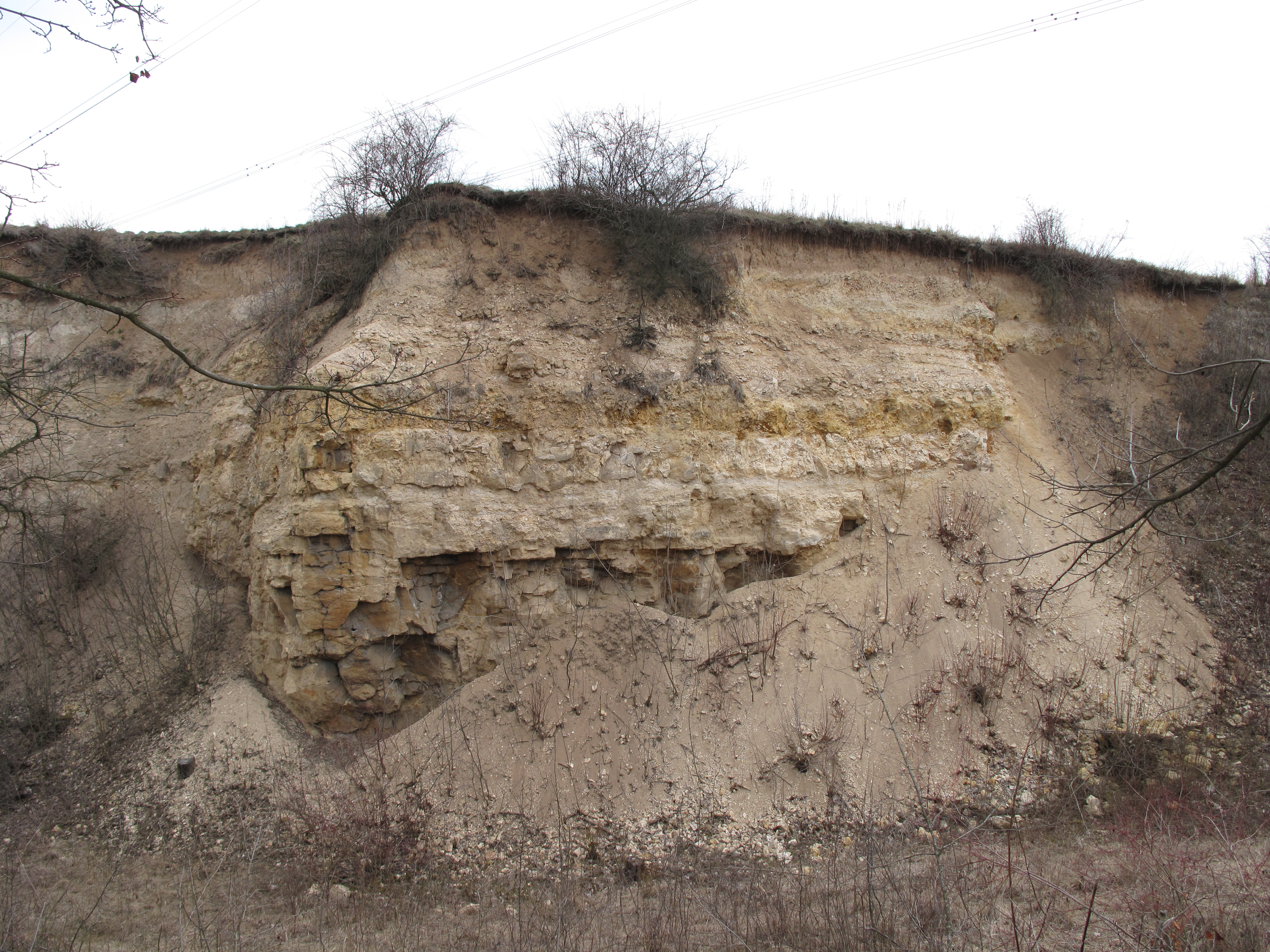
Layers of freshwater limestone, of Miocene age, near Tuchořice

A platform cycle began at the Permian-Triassic boundary with periodic erosion and occasional marine transgressions into the Late Cretaceous and the Paleogene, coupled with alkali volcanic activity. Radial faulting occurred during the Alpine orogeny. Pre-Triassic development of the Czech West Carphathians is related to the Brunovistulian. The pre-Devonian basement and the sedimentary cover of the Brunovistulian underlie the Mesozoic and Cenozoic formations in the West Carpathians. Limestones in the south are from the Triassic and Jurassic. To the north is an allochthonous ocean environment, to the north of the Klippen Belt. The Outer Flysch Carpathians formed after the main Carpathian Orogeny in the Late Cretaceous, showing synorogenic sedimentary sequences from Cretaceous-Oligocene age that move northward as far as the Carpathian Foredeep. The last thrusting in late Miocene brought erosion, local uplifting and subsidence in Quaternary depressions.

== Natural resource geology ==
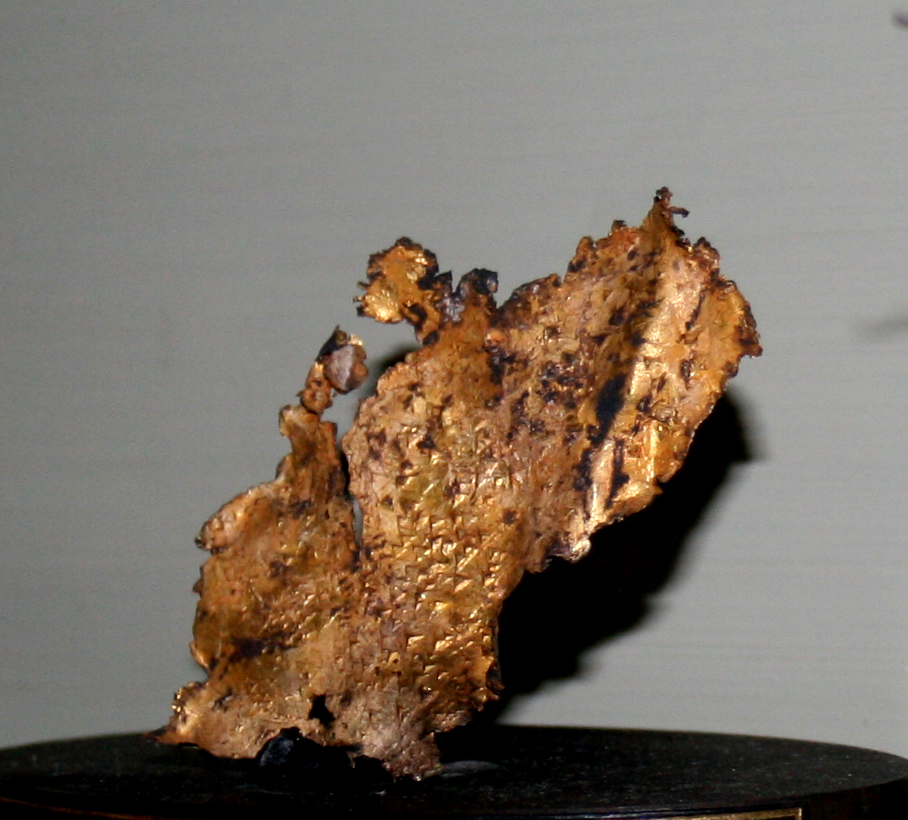
Gold from the Czech Republic

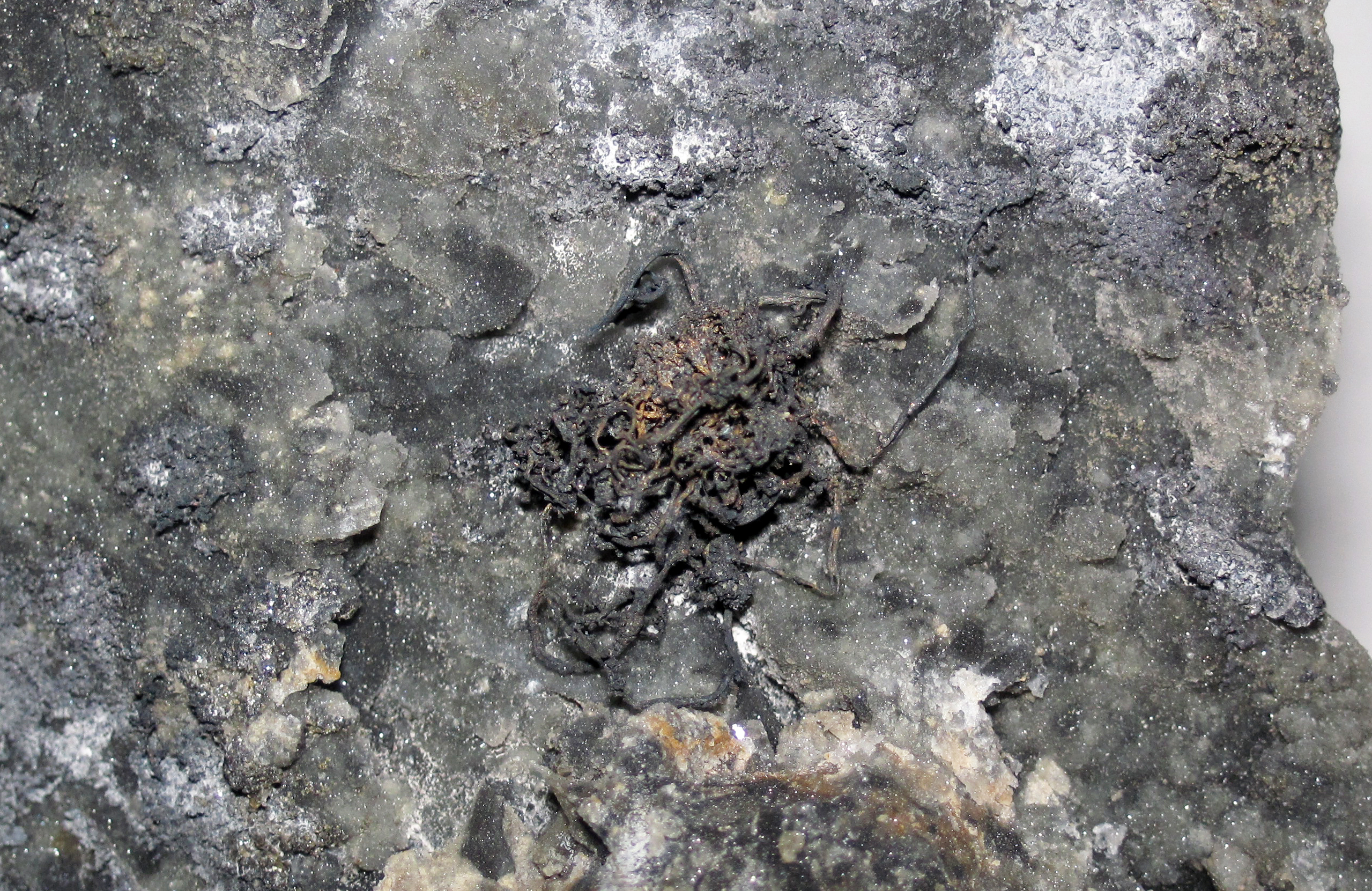
Silver from near Jáchymov

Resource such as silver, gold and iron ore have been mined since the Middle Ages. The Bohemian Massif and the Western Carpathians are the main metallogenic zones. The Bohemian Massif is characterized by complex, mostly epigenetic, mineralization of Variscan age including gold, tin, uranium, silver, lead, zinc and limited copper together black coal deposits from both the Carboniferous and Cenozoic. The West Carpathians have no resources. A few oil fields exist in the Czech Republic, such as the Hodonin field in the Vienna Basin.

=== Moldanubian metallogenic province ===
The Moldanubian metallogenic province covers most of the Moldanubian Zone. In the Moldanubian subprovince, lead and zinc form as vein deposits with silver in the contact aureole of the Central Moldanubian Pluton and Central Bohemian Pluton (including ore districts such as Kutna Hora, Prribram and Jihlava). Vein deposits of gold ores and the disseminated gold deposit at Mokrsko, south of Prague are limited to the western contact with the Central Bohemian Pluton. Uranium ore deposits in the Pribram district or near the contact of the Bohemicum-Moldanubian Zone, northeast of the Cesky les Tachov or at the contact of the Central Moldanubian Pluton have been investigated since the 1980s. An unusual zinc-copper ore deposit was mined in the last after 1982 in the Ransko gabbro-peridotite massif which also shows some nickel sulfide mineralization.

The Krkonose Mountains metallogenic subprovince in the Lugicoum area, centers on the Krkonose Pluton and the Orlicke hory Mountains-Klodzko subprovince. It has highly variable deposits of little economic importance including lead, zinc, copper and gold.
