= Giessen nappe =

Coordinates: 50°34′50″N 8°35′14″E

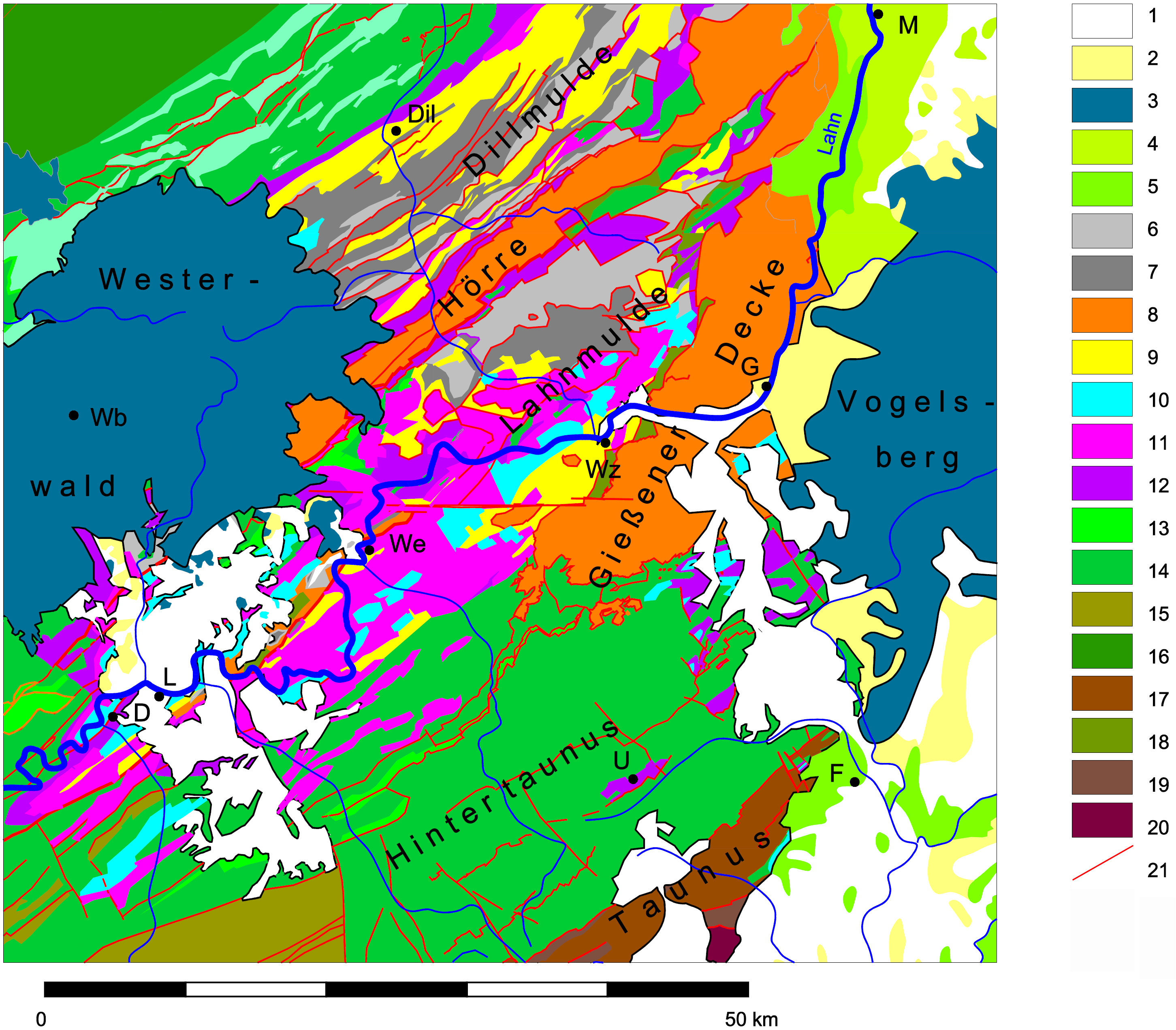
Geologic map of the southeastern part of the Rhenish Massif, showing outcrops of the Giessen nappe in orange. The Giessen nappe has the same colour as the Hörre zone, which is on the other, northwestern side of the Lahn syncline.

The Giessen nappe (German: Gießener Decke) is a tectonic nappe in the southeastern part of the Rhenish Massif in western Germany. The nappe is an "alien" (allochthonous) unit in the Rhenohercynian zone of the Hercynian orogeny, it was thrust over the usual slightly metamorphosed Devonian and Carboniferous sedimentary rocks in this zone.

The Giessen nappe is often correlated with the Harz nappe in the Harz and similar units in the Bohemian Massif in the Czech Republic. These units form the rare erosional leftovers of small microcontinents that were during the Hercynian orogeny squeezed between the paleocontinents Gondwana to the south and Laurussia to the north.

== Outcrop area ==
Giessen nappe outcrops cover about 300 km^{2} from the western edge of the Vogelsberg over Braunfels, Wetzlar and Gießen, almost to Marburg. The river Lahn flows along the northern part of the nappe until it crosses the nappe between Gießen and Wetzlar to continue flowing westwards to the Rhine.

== Lithology and stratigraphy ==
The Giessen nappe consists of a thin sequence of slightly metamorphosed Lower and Middle Devonian slates and radiolarites covered with Upper Devonian to Lower Carboniferous greywackes. At some spots along the base of the Giessen nappe alien tectonic slices of metabasalt occur. Chemical analysis of these rocks shows they were originally mid ocean ridge basalts. Especially the Upper Devonian to Lower Carboniferous greywackes are clearly different from the rocks of this age of the Rhenohercynian basin, that now form the footwall of the Giessen nappe. This difference in lithology led German geologist Franz Kossmat in 1927 to the conclusion that the Giessen nappe is an allochthonous unit.

The base thrust of the Giessen nappe consists of cataclasites, breccias and mylonites and forms a semi-horizontal thrust plane. Locally the thrust plane can be deformed by late stage folding and thrusting. Erosion has separated some small pieces of the nappe from the central mass, forming small klippes in the vicinity of Braunfels and Wetzlar. Internally, the rocks of the nappe are isoclinally folded and cut by shear zones.

=== Literature ===
- Birkelbach, M. et al.; 1988: Die geologische Entwicklung der östlichen Lahnmulde (Exkursion C. am 7. April 1988), Jahresberichte und Mitteilungen des oberrheinischen geologischen Vereins, Neue Folge 70, pp. 43-74.
- Dörr, W.; 1990: Stratigraphie, Stoffbestand und Fazies der Gießener Grauwacke (östliches Rheinisches Schiefergebirge), Geologische Abhandlungen Hessen 91, p. 94.
- Grösser, J. & Dörr, W.; 1986: MOR-Basalte im östlichen Rheinischen Schiefergebirge, Neues Jahrbuch für Geologie und Paläontologie 12, pp. 705–722.
- Huckriede, H.; Wemmer, K.; Ahrendt, H. (2004). "Palaeogeography and tectonic structure of allochthonous units in the German part of the Rheno-Hercynian Belt (Central European Variscides)". International Journal of Earth Sciences. 93: 414–431.
- Kalvoda, J.; Bábek, O.; Leichmann, J.; Melichar, R. & Špaček, P.; 2006: Tectonostratigraphic development of the Devonian and Carboniferous in the Brunovistulian terrane, Czech Republic, in: Aretz, M. & Herbig, H.-G. (eds.): Carboniferous Conference Cologne. From Platform to Basin, Kölner Forum für Geologie und Paläontologie 15, ISBN 3-934027-18-0.
- Kossmat, F.; 1927: Gliederung des varistischen Gebirgsbaus, Abhandlungen der Sächsischen Geologischen Landes-Anstalt 1, p. 39.
- Walter, R.; et al.; 1992: Geologie von Mitteleuropa, Schweizerbarth’sche Verlagsbuchhandlung, Stuttgart (5th ed.), ISBN 3-510-65149-9.
