= Geology of Alderney =

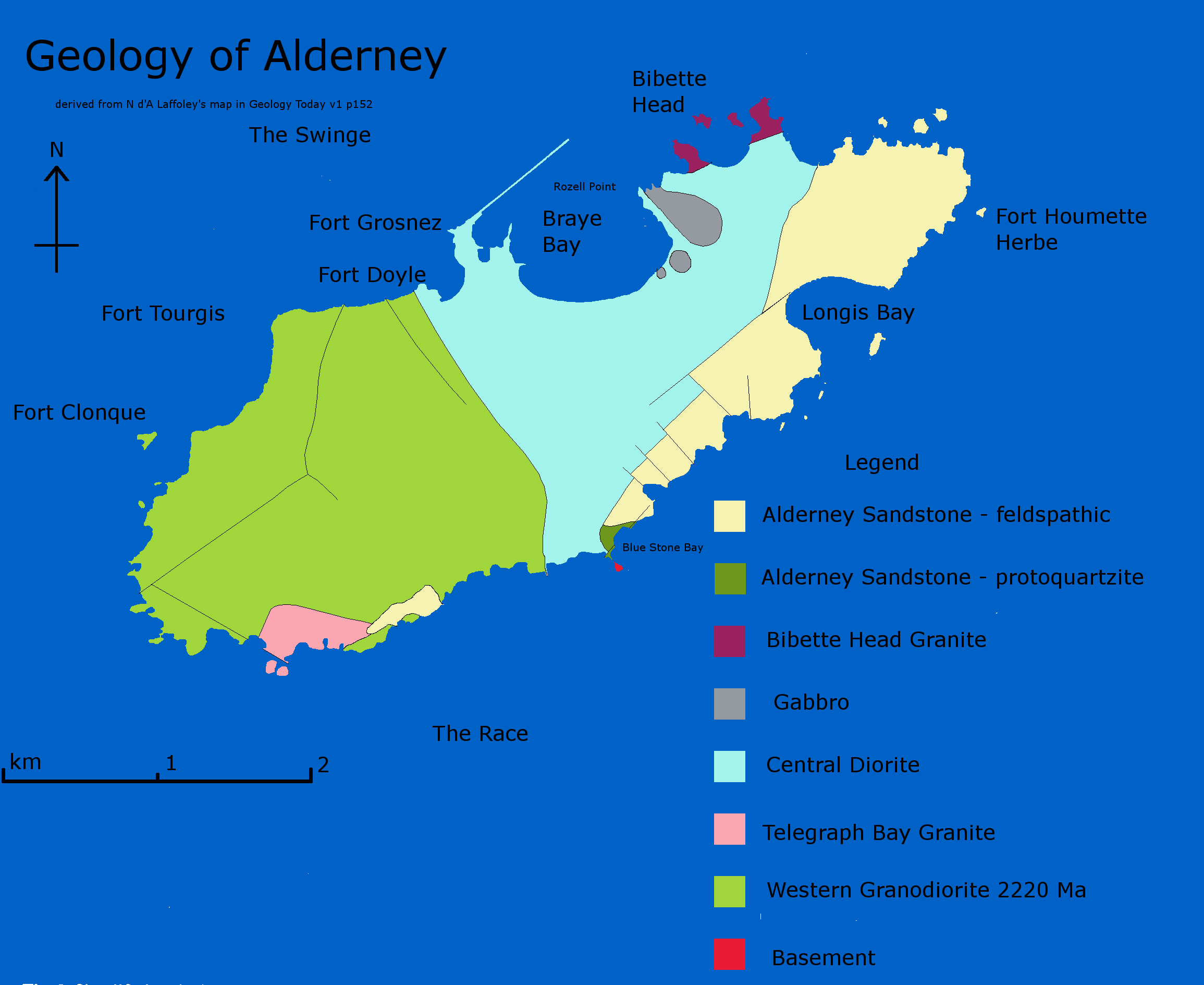
Rock units of Alderney

The geology of Alderney includes similarities in its rock to the neighbouring Normandy and Guernsey. Although Alderney is only five kilometers long, it has a geological history spanning half of the life of the earth. It is part of the Armorican Massif.

== Geological history ==
Relics of sediments appear as xenoliths in granites. However the earliest dated rock is the grey coloured Western Granodiorite from 2,220 million years ago in the Paleoproterozoic. As its name suggests it is found in the west end of Alderney. The xenoliths in it are dark ellipses that demonstrate that the rock has been squashed. This granite in turn was intruded by the Telegraph Bay Granite in the southernmost part of the island. This granite contains 50 mm feldspar crystals. Aplite veins continued from the same magma. The final stage of intrusion was a microgranite forming many dykes. Feldspar in the pink microgranite is only 2 mm big.

The next stage of geological history was the intrusion of the Central Diorite Complex that makes up the north and centre of the island. This belongs to the Cadomian Orogeny time at 600 to 500 million years ago. Embedded in the diorite are a couple of large gabbro inclusions, as well as a picrite on the east of Braye Bay. Some of the diorite has orbicular structure, concentric spheres of plagioclase and hornblende rich zones form balls up to 20 cm in diameter. A pale coloured granite intruded on the north: the Bibette Head Granite. This contains many xenoliths. Sodium rich dykes then were intruded.

In the next stage the terrane was uplifted, and eroded. Fine grained sand that formed quartzite was deposited. Further weathering ensued, with most of this deposit removed and laterite formed. Next a stream channel formed over the land, dumping coarse sand with feldspar. This formed a pink sandstone. The flow came from the northwest, with particles derived from granite and gneiss. initially this filled in the hollows in the underlying granites, but soon overflowed into a braided channel. Flood plain conditions caused layers of silt to form between the sand. These sediments deposited in the Cambrian are probably the final stage of the Cadomian Orogeny.

In the Variscan Orogeny folding and faulting affected all the rocks. Dolerite (or diabase) and lamprophyre dykes intruded. These are probably from the Carboniferous period.

In the Pleistocene varying sea levels caused raised beaches to form 8, 18 and 30 meters above the current sea level. As in Jersey, loess blew in as dust from the bare ground in the near glacial conditions in the ice ages. Head also formed in the periglacial circumstances by breaking off rock fragments and mixing with dirt.
