= Geology of Guernsey =

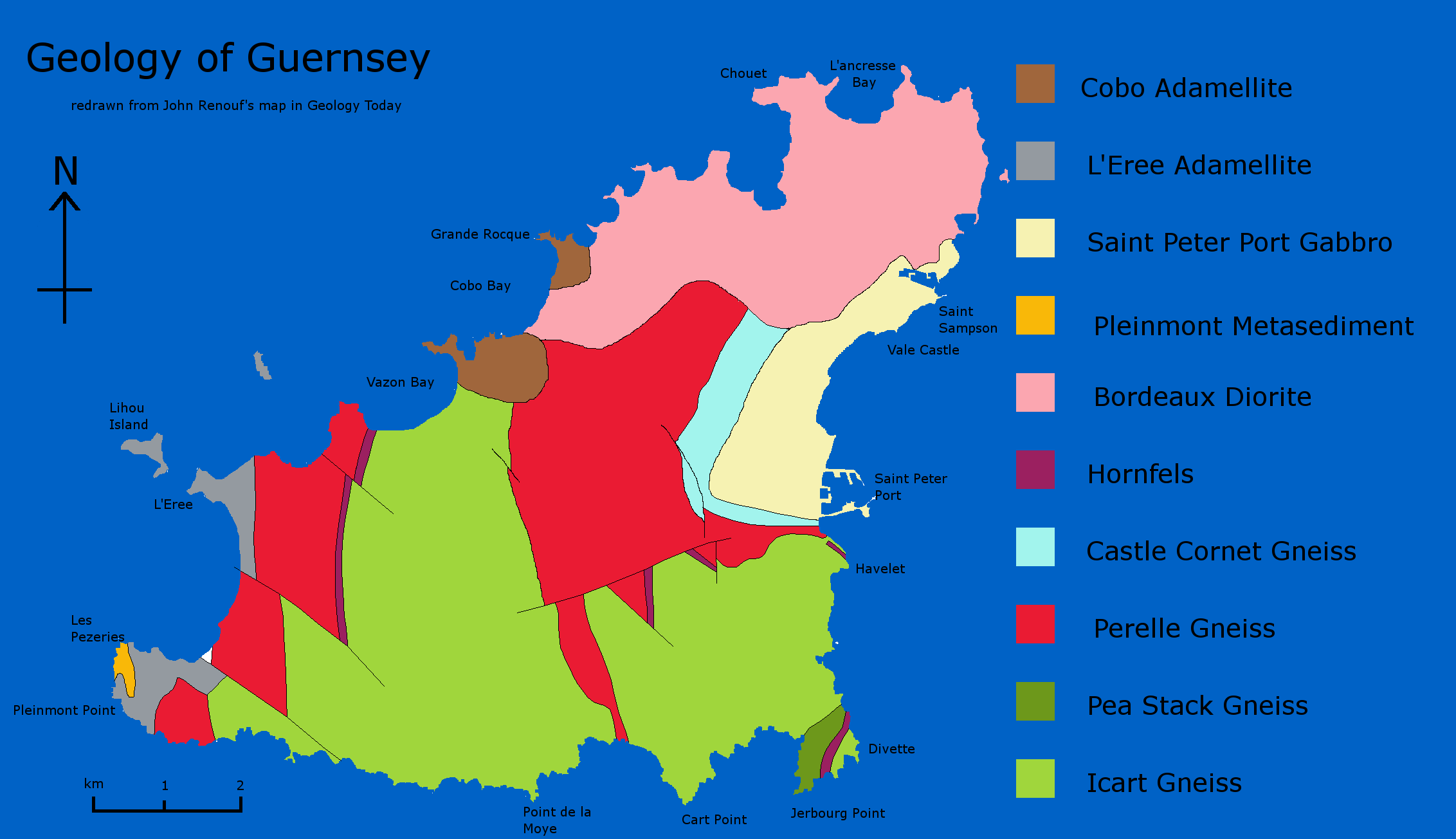
Geology of Guernsey

Guernsey has a geological history stretching further back into the past than most of Europe. The majority of rock exposures on the Island may be found along the coastlines, with inland exposures scarce and usually highly weathered. There is a broad geological division between the north and south of the Island. The Southern Metamorphic Complex is elevated above the geologically younger, lower lying Northern Igneous Complex. Guernsey has experienced a complex geological evolution (especially the rocks of the southern complex) with multiple phases of intrusion and deformation recognisable.

== Geological history ==
=== Precambrian ===
The southern part if the island is largely composed of Icart Gneiss. The Icart Gneiss is an augen gneiss of granitic composition containing potassium feldspar. This was formed from a granite dated at 2,061 million years ago using U-Pb dating on zircon grains. A foliated Perelle quartz diorite (also called Perelle Gneiss), occurs in the centre and west of the island. This is a calc-alkaline tonalitic rock. The foliation was formed at around 600 million years ago during the Cadomian Orogeny. Rafts of metamorphosed sediments, older than the Foliated Perelle Diorite are embedded between them.

The Pleinmont Formation consists of metamorphosed sediments is of unknown age, although it has been proposed that these belong to the Brioverian group that outcrop on nearby Jersey It is named after Pleinmont Point on the south west tip of the Island.

The older rocks were deformed during the Cadomian Orogeny. The Icart Gneisses formed the basement to an outboard terrane that was subsequently accreted to Armorica.

The Cobo Granite was formed at approximately 570 million years ago, named after Cobo Bay on the mid west coast. The north end of the island is an unfoliated calc-alkaline pluton of the Bordeaux Diorite Complex consisting of diorite, tonalite, and granodiorite. This is also dated at 570 million years ago.

On the central east coast around Saint Peter Port is the St Peter Port Gabbro containing layers with olivine, hornblende and two kinds of pyroxene. The igneous plutonic intrusion is 2.5 km from north to south and is 0.8 km thick. It dips shallowly to the west. The lower and upper portions are layered on the scale of a meter, while millimeter scale layering is found on the uppermost parts. This is also dated at 570 million years ago. Near Vale Castle the rock is of a type called bojite with interlocking hornblende and plagioclase crystals.

=== Quaternary ===
During the Quaternary Devensian glaciation, loess was deposited, blown in by wind from the west. The island was only separated from the continent of Europe by rising sea levels at about 5000 BC during the new stone age.

== Lihou Island ==
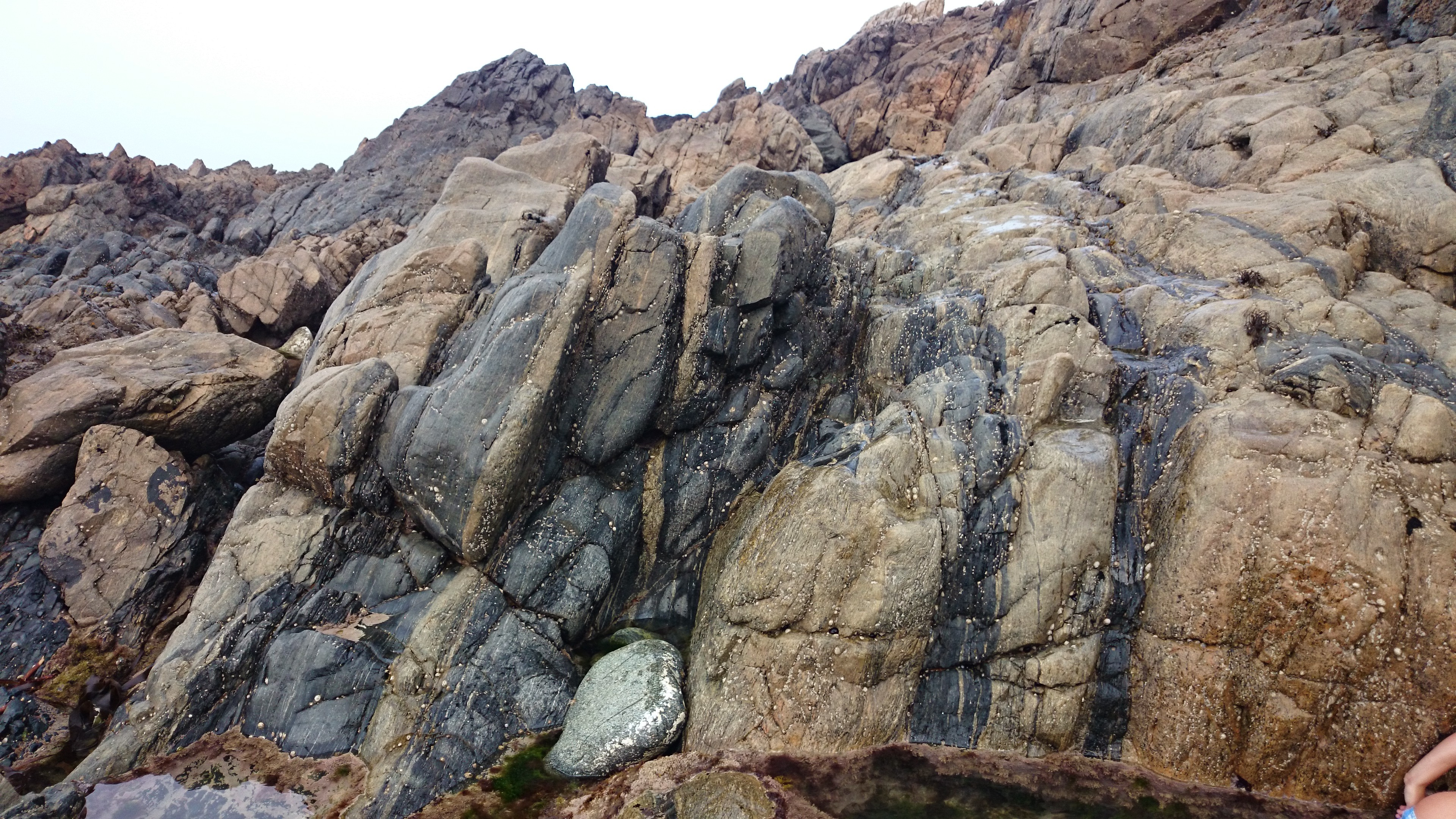
Tight folds at the contact between Icart Gneiss (light) and mylonitised quartz diorite (dark), western end of Lihou Island

Many of the rocks present in the south of Guernsey may also be observed on Lihou Island. At the western coast of the island, a shear zone is exposed at the contact between the Perelle Foliated Quartz Diorite and the Icart Gneiss. The younger quartz diorite is mylonitised, where field evidence suggests that it was most likely deformed synchronously with its intrusion. The contact between the two rocks is tightly folded, as are the mylonitic fabrics in the two rocks.

Dykes are abundant on the Island, largely of doleritic composition.

== Quarrying ==
Guernsey has had an active quarrying industry over the years, largely removing rock for use as building materials. Many local houses are constructed of either blue-grey Bordeaux Diorite, or red-brown Cobo Granite. The only remaining active quarry is Les Vardes on the west coast of the Island, operated by Ronez. Here the Bordeaux Diorite is extracted and crushed on site to produce aggregate.

Many of the disused quarry sites have been allowed to fill with water, such as St. Andrews Reservoir, now used by the States of Guernsey water board. Mont Cuet is another former quarry, now used as a landfill site to dispose of the majority of the Island's non-recyclable waste.

== See also ==
- Geology of Alderney
