= Moldanubian Zone =

Tectonic zone in Europe

Most important structures and zones of the Variscan or Hercynian Orogeny in Europe.

The Moldanubian Zone is in the regional geology of Europe a tectonic zone formed during the Variscan or Hercynian Orogeny (400 to 300 million years ago, during the Devonian and Carboniferous periods). The Moldanubian Zone crops out in the Bohemian Massif and the southern part of the Black Forest and Vosges and contains the highest grade metamorphic rocks of Variscan age in Europe.

The Moldanubian Zone was introduced by German geologist Franz Kossmat in 1927. It has a generally higher grade of metamorphism than the Saxothuringian Zone to the northwest. The contact between the two is a thrust over which the Moldanubian Zone moved over the Saxothuringian Zone during the Variscan Orogeny. In the east the Moldanubian Zone is thrust over the Moravo-Silesian Zone, which is also generally lower grade.

== Geology ==
The Moldanubian Zone of the Bohemian Massif can be divided into two tectonic units: the Teplá-Barrandian Zone (or "Bohemicum") and the Moldanubian Zone sensu stricto ("Moldanubicum"). The last contains large granitoid plutons and nappes.

=== Moldanubicum ===
The Moldanubicum or Moldanubian sensu stricto consists of high grade metamorphic rocks. The protoliths may have a Proterozoic age, but their origins or ages are mostly unknown.

The tectonostratigraphy of the Moldanubian Zone sensu stricto is divided into three main units:

- At the top the Gföhl unit, a stack of south-vergent crystalline nappes. It consists mostly of rocks of high metamorphic grade (up to amphibolite or granulite facies). These can be metamorphic sediments but also orthogneisses. In the lower part of the Gföhl unit contains amphibolites with early Paleozoic magmatic crystallisation ages occur. The Gföhl Gneis is an orthogneiss with an Ordovician granitoid protolith. These meta-intrusive rocks are intercalated with marbles (meta-sediment). Some peridotite lenses occur too. All of these rocks have high metamorphic grades (granulite and eclogite facies).
- The Gföhl unit was thrust over the Drosendorf unit, which consists of a Proterozoic basement with an early Paleozoic cover of metasediments. Internal thrusting in this unit is, like the Gföhl unit, dominantly south-vergent. The base of the Gföhl unit is formed by the "Variegated Series", an assemblage of different metamorphosed rock types. The Drosendorf unit also contains orthogneisses with Proterozoic magmatic crystallisation ages (Svetlik and Dobra gneisses).
- The Ostrong unit or "Monotonous Series" forms the lowest unit of the Moldanubian Zone. It consists of high grade metamorphic rocks with both igneous (orthogneiss and amphibolite) and sedimentary (paragneiss) protoliths. Lenses of eclogite occur, which were overprinted by granulite facies metamorphism.

=== Intrusions ===
These three tectonic units and their contacts are cut off by large batholith intrusions of late Variscan ages. The largest ones are the South Bohemian Batholith and the Central Bohemian Batholith. They consist of many different generations of intrusions often cutting through each other.

== Tectonic history ==
The Moldanubian Zone is interpreted as the lower crust of a microcontinent called Cadomia or Armorica. This small piece of continental crust was sandwiched in between the larger continents of Laurussia (to the north) and Gondwana (to the south) during the Variscan Orogeny. Some authors think the microcontinent stretched far enough to also encompass the pre-Variscan basement of the Armorican Massif, others think a string of small microcontinents more reasonable.

== Literature ==
- Franke, W.; 1992: Phanerozoic structures and events in central Europe, in: Blundell, D.J.; Freeman, R. & Mueller, S. (eds.): A Continent Revealed - The European Geotraverse, 297 pp., Cambridge University Press, ISBN 0-521-42948-X, pp. 164–179.
- Franke, W.; 2000: The mid-European segment of the Variscides: tectonostratigraphic units, terrane boundaries and plate tectonic evolution, in: Franke, W.; Haak, V.; Oncken, O. & Tanner, D. (eds.); Orogenic Processes, Quantification and Modelling in the Variscan Belt, Geological Society of London, Special Publications 179, pp. 35–61.
- Kossmat, F.; 1927: Gliederung des varistischen Gebirgsbaues, Abhandlungen des Sächsischen Geologischen Landesamtes 1, pp. 1–39.
- Matte, P.; 2001: The Variscan collage and orogeny (480±290 Ma) and the tectonic definition of the Armorica microplate: a review, Terra Nova 13, 122-128.
- Raumer, J.F. von; Stampfli, G.M. & Bussy, F.; 2003: Gondwana-derived microcontinents – the constituents of the Variscan and Alpine collisional orogens, Tectonophysics 365, pp. 7–22.
- Walter, R.; 2003: Erdgeschichte – Die Entstehung der Kontinente und Ozeane, 325 pp., Walter de Gruyter, Berlin (5th ed.), ISBN 3-11-017697-1.
- Ziegler, P.A.; 1990: Geological Atlas of Western and Central Europe, Shell Internationale Petroleum Maatschappij BV (2nd ed.), ISBN 90-6644-125-9.
