= Saxothuringian Zone =

European tectonic zone

Most important structures and zones of the Hercynian orogeny in Europe.

The Saxothuringian Zone, Saxo-Thuringian zone or Saxothuringicum is in geology a structural or tectonic zone in the Hercynian or Variscan orogen (380-270 million years old) of central and western Europe. Because rocks of Hercynian age are in most places covered by younger strata, the zone is not everywhere visible at the surface. Places where it crops out are the northern Bohemian Massif, the Spessart, the Odenwald, the northern parts of the Black Forest and Vosges and the southern part of the Taunus. West of the Vosges terranes on both sides of the English Channel are also seen as part of the zone, for example the Lizard complex in Cornwall or the Léon Zone of the Armorican Massif (Brittany).

== Location ==
In central Europe the Saxothuringian Zone is situated between the Rhenohercynian Zone to the northwest and the Moldanubian Zone to the southeast. The Hercynian metamorphism of the former zone is generally lower grade; that of the latter zone higher grade than that of the Saxothuringian Zone. West of the Vosges the zone is displaced to the north by a major strike-slip fault, the Bray Fault.

The Saxothuringian Zone is in some places transected by Permo-Triassic grabens and intramontane basins filled with Rotliegend sediments and older deposits. The Eger Graben in the northwest of the Czech Republic and the Saar-Nahe Basin in western Germany are examples of such structures.

== Geology ==
The Saxothuringian Zone consists of early Paleozoic marine sediments that were deposited in the Saxothuringian Basin. They were slightly metamorphosed during the Hercynian orogeny. The sedimentary sequence is assumed to be continuous from the Ediacaran to the Visean (330 million years ago). These metasediments form a wide zone north of the city of Dresden in Saxony.

Tectonostratigraphically, gneisses (high-grade metamorphic rocks) and granites are found under these metasediments. They crop out as the competent massifs of the Ore Mountains and Saxonian Granulite Massif. They were deformed and recrystallized during the Cadomian orogeny (in the Ediacaran, 650-550 million years ago) and intruded by felsic plutons during the Cambrian and Ordovician (540-420 million years ago).

In some places klippes of allochthonous crystalline rocks are found on top of these two units. These klippes are the Münchberg complex, Wildenfels complex and Frankenberg complex. They consisted originally of a sequence of deep-marine (flysch) sediments of Ordovician to Devonian age (480-360 million years old) and early Paleozoic mid-oceanic ridge basalts. The latter have been metamorphosed at a high grade (up to eclogite facies). These allochthonous nappes can probably be correlated with the Teplá terrane in the Moldanubian Zone further south.

The Saxothuringian Zone is often also supposed to include the Mid-German Crystalline High, which then forms the northern part of the zone and lies directly next to the Rhenohercynian Northern Phyllite Zone. The Mid-German Crystalline High crops out in the Odenwald, the Spessart and the northern Vosges. It consists of Proterozoic orthogneisses and early Paleozoic volcanic (amphibolites with MORB-protoliths and tuffs) and sedimentary (pelites, calcareous schists and marbles) rocks that were metamorphosed at high grade during the Hercynian orogeny (up to amphibolite facies). These rocks were intruded by two generations of plutons: Silurian to Early Devonian (440-400 million years old) granitoids and middle Carboniferous (Hercynian, 340-325 million years old) granites.

== See also ==
- Geology of Germany

== Bibliography ==
- Franke, W.; 1992: Phanerozoic structures and events in central Europe, in: Blundell, D.J.; Freeman, R. & Mueller, S. (eds.): A Continent Revealed - The European Geotraverse, 297 pp., Cambridge University Press, ISBN 0-521-42948-X, pp. 164–179.
- Franke, W.; 2000: The mid-European segment of the Variscides: tectonostratigraphic units, terrane boundaries and plate tectonic evolution, in: Franke, W.; Haak, V.; Oncken, O. & Tanner, D. (eds.); Orogenic Processes, Quantification and Modelling in the Variscan Belt, Geological Society of London, Special Publications 179, pp. 35–61.
- Kossmat, F.; 1927: Gliederung des varistischen Gebirgsbaues, Abhandlungen des Sächsischen Geologischen Landesamtes 1, pp. 1–39.
- Kroner, U.; Hahn, T.; Romer, R.L. & Linnemann, U.; 2007: The Variscan orogeny in the Saxo-Thuringian zone - heterogeneous overprint of Cadomian/Paleozoic Peri-Gondwana crust, in: Linnemann, U.; Nance, R.D.; Kraft, P. & Zulauf, G. (eds.): The evolution of the Rheic Ocean: from Avalonian-Cadomian active margin to Alleghenian-Variscan collision, Geological Society of America Special Paper 423 pp. 153–172.
- Linnemann, U.-G.; 1995: The Neoproterozoic terranes of Saxony (Germany), Precambrian Research 73, pp. 235–250.
- Matte, P.; 2001: The Variscan collage and orogeny (480±290 Ma) and the tectonic definition of the Armorica microplate: a review, Terra Nova 13, 122-128.
- Matte, P.; Maluski, H.; Rajlich, P. & Franke, W.; 1990: Terrane boundaries in the Bohemian Massif: Result of large-scale Variscan shearing, Tectonophysics 177, pp. 151–170.
- Oncken, O.; 1997: Transformation of a magmatic arc and an orogenic root during oblique collision and its consequences for the evolution of the European Variscides (Mid-German Crystalline Rise), Geologische Rundschau 86, pp. 2–20.
- Raumer, J.F. von; Stampfli, G.M. & Bussy, F.; 2003: Gondwana-derived microcontinents — the constituents of the Variscan and Alpine collisional orogens, Tectonophysics 365, pp. 7–22.
- Linnemann, Ulf; & Romer, Rolf; 2010: Pre-Mesozoic Geology of Saxo-Thuringia 488 p. ISBN 978-3-510-65259-4
- Walter, R.; 2003: Erdgeschichte – Die Entstehung der Kontinente und Ozeane, 325 pp., Walter de Gruyter, Berlin (5^{e} druk), ISBN 3-11-017697-1.
