= Cadomian Orogeny =

Tectonic event(s) in the late Neoproterozoic

The Cadomian orogeny occurred in the Late Neoproterozoic-Early Cambrian, 700-425 Ma. There was a continuum between its post-orogenic processes and the opening of the Rheic Ocean and the concomitant rifting of Avalonia.

In 1921 L. Bertrand named this orogeny after Cadomus, the Latin version of the Gaulish name for Caen in Normandy. He defined it as the late Precambrian orogeny which in the Northern Armorican Massif resulted in the folding and uplift of the Brioverian succession (see below) prior to the deposition of the Early Palaeozoic red bed sequences.

This orogeny occurred as a result of one or more collision between various terranes and the northern margin of Gondwana. These terranes have since drifted from Gondwana and have been accreted to Baltica (the proto European tectonic plate). Therefore, their palaeogeographical position is uncertain. The investigations of this orogeny started with examinations of its remnants in various part of Europe. More recently there also have been studies of this orogeny in locations in North Africa and also the Arabian Peninsula, Jordan, Israel and the Persian Gulf as these areas were also affected by it.

This collection of terranes is collectively referred to as peri-Gondwanan terranes because they were along the northern margin of Gondwana. Those which were accreted to Baltica in the Variscan orogeny (Late Devonian- Carboniferous) when Africa was approaching Laurussia are: Franconia and Thuringia (now in Germany) in the Saxothuringian Zone; Bohemia, which forms the Teplá-Barrandian and Brunovistulian zones of the Bohemian Massif (Czech Republic, northern Austria, eastern Germany, southern and Poland); Armorica (in France); the Ossa-Morena and Central-Iberian zones of the Iberian Massif in the Iberian Peninsula.

The Cadomian orogeny started with a southward oblique subduction beneath the northern margin of Gondwana that began ca. 760 Ma. It involved the development of an Andean-type volcanic arc ca. 650-600 Ma and the formation of a back-arc basin behind this arc which opened ca. 590 to 560 Ma and was closed ca. 545-540 Ma. A short-lived retro-arc basin formed c. 543 Ma. The slab of the subducting plate broke off. Rift basins formed in the Early to Middle Cambrian (c. 530–500 Ma). This continued until the opening of the opening of the Rheic Ocean.

The collision was an island arc-continent type and was a two-phase one due to the subduction being oblique. It first started in the eastern part of Peri-Gondwana at c. 560–570 Ma. There was a continuum between the opening of the rift basins and the opening of the Rheic Ocean. This was a two-stage process, too. It started from the west of Peri-Gondwana and expanded eastward.

== Cadomian geology in the Armorican Massif ==
=== Basement ===
The Armorican Massif pre Cadomian basement rocks consist of Orosirian or Paleoproterozoic Icart gneiss dated at close to 2,018 million years ago. These are exposed on Guernsey and at Cape La Hague in Normandy. This is termed the Icartian succession. Near Trégor the gneiss in the Cadomian Perros-Guirec complex has been U-Pb dated to 1,790 million years ago. Sark also has a gneiss basement. Vidal et al. studied Strontium isotope ratios and concluded that the basement is not widely present below the Cadomian orogeny, and Rabu et al. argued that the existing surface gneiss are fragments detached from the African craton. However it is possible that a basement of gneiss exists at depth below Normandy and Brittany. This gneiss was formerly known as Pentevrian. However it is now known that the Pentevrian type rocks do not predate the Cadomian orogeny, and this name is no longer appropriate for the Icart Gneiss.

=== Brioverian series ===
The Brioverian series is a thick siliciclastic succession deposited during the Cadomian cycle found in the Armorican Massif area in Brittany and Normandy (NW France) and in the Channel Islands.

The Brioverian sequence of rocks was deposited during or before the Ediacaran period 750 to 540 million years ago. Most of these sediments are mudstone, siltstone or sandstone, but there are also some conglomerate, phtanites (quartzite cemented with lime) and contaminated limestone. These seem to be deposited in a submarine fan. There are also acid and basic volcanics interbedded. Some authors believe that there was an unconformity during the Brioverian succession, as there are phtanite stones in the upper parts believed to be eroded from the lower parts, but this is still inconclusive.

Cadomian magmatism has been dated in the intrusions and volcanics as 690 to 500 million years ago. Foliated quartz diorite occur at Baie de St Brieuc, at Coutances, La Hague, Guernsey, Alderney and Sark. These are only roughly dated 700 to 580 million years ago. The last magmatism identified is the Jersey Dyke Swarm from 425 million years ago.

Partial melting has resulted in migmatites. These form belts named after Saint-Malo, Dinan, and St Cast in northeast Brittany. The Rance valley has a metamorphic sequence including phyllites, amphibolite, metatexites, and diatexites which have melted into granite. Leucogranites and anatectic granites have been derived from sediments melting. East Brittany and Lower Normandy contains the Mancellian batholith which consists of intrusions of granodiorite and granite. These other plutons are derived from fractionally crystallized mantle melts.

At the Baie de St Brieuc and near Coutances in Manche and Trégor region there are pillow lavas, basalt erupted under water. A later stage of acid volcanics in the form of andesite and rhyolite have been erupted on Brioverian sediments on Jersey at 533 million years ago, and at St Germain-le-Gaillard in Lower Normandy. In the Tregor region there are units called Tuffs de Tréguier and Ignimbrites de Lézardrieux.

The southern edge of the Gulf of Saint-Malo between Tregor and Cancale shows the deformational structures of the Cadomian Orogeny. These are East-west to North East trending upright folding. Schistosity is developed parallel to the axial plane of the folds. Prehnite-pumpellyite facies to mid-amphibolite facies have been produced by metamorphism. Movement was concentrated in shear belts such as at St Cast. The movement on the belts was sinistral and horizontal.

During the orogeny the migmatite belts of north east Brittany were formed. Baie de St Brieuc and St Malo migmatites were deformed with the typical structure.

=== Post orogeny ===
After the orogeny, continental sediments were washed on top of the deformed Cadomian rocks. They include conglomerate and sandstone in Brittany, Jersey and Alderney. The Cap Frehel red beds are dated at 472 million years ago. These post orogeny deposits were dumped from braided stream channels. The basins for these sediments followed the structural grain in the Cadomian Orogeny.

=== Models ===
There are two overall models for the features of the Cadomian Orogeny in the Armorican Massif.

In the first one Brun & Bale (1990) propose oblique thrusting SW-ward along an E-NE-trending plate boundary. Three main tectonic units, the Trégor volcanic and plutonic belt, the Guingamp-St Malo high temperature belt and the Baie de St Brieuc metamorphic-thrust were thrust over each other SW-ward 590–580 Ma.

In the second one, Treloar and Strachan (1990) consider that the North Armorican Massif was put together from a series of terranes 540 million years ago. Their sutures are the shear zones. The terranes are the St Brieuc, St Malo and Mancellian terranes. Deformation in this model was s caused by oblique subduction and is strike-slip. There was no crustal thickening. The migmatite belts would then be explained by high heat flow in marginal basins.

== Bibliography ==
- Bertrand L., Les Anciennes mers de la France et leurs dépôts, 1921, Paris, Flammarion.
- D'lemos R. S,. Strachan R. A.,. Topley C. G. The Cadomian orogeny in the North Armorican Massif: a brief review In D'Lemos, R. S., Strachan, R. A. & Topley, C. G. (Eds.), 1990, The Cadomian Orogeny, Geological Society Special Publication No. 51, pp. 3–12
- Brun J. P., Balé P. (1990) Cadomian tectonics in northern Brittany, Geological Society London Special Publications, Vol. 51 pp. 95–114
- Linnemann T., Pereira F., Jeffries T. E., Drost K., Gerdes A. (2008) The Cadomian Orogeny and the opening of the Rheic Ocean: The diacrony of geotectonic processes constrained by LA-ICP-MS U–Pb zircon dating (Ossa-Morena and Saxo-Thuringian Zones, Iberian and Bohemian Massifs) Tectonophysics, Vol. 461 (1-4) pp. 21–43
- Linnemann U., Gerdes A (2012) Cadomian Orogeny and opening of the Rheic Ocean: Constraints from LA-ICP-MS U-Pb and Lu-Hf analysis of detrital and magmatic zircon (Saxo-Thuringian Zone, Bohemian Massif) European Mineralogical Conference Vol. 1
- Linnemann U., Gerdes A,, Hofmann M., Marko L. (2013) The Cadomian Orogen: Neoproterozoic to Early Cambrian Crustal Growth and Orogenic Zoning Along the Northwestern Periphery of the West African Craton, in STRATI 2013, First International Congress on Stratigraphy At the Cutting Edge of Stratigraphy, Springer Geology
- Murphy J. B.,, Eguiluz L., Zulauf G., (2002) Cadomian Orogens, peri-Gondwanan correlatives and Laurentia–Baltica connections, Tectonophysics, Vol. 352, pp. 1 – 9
- Plant, J.A., Whittaker, A., Demetriades, A., de Vivo, B., Lexa, J., The Geological and Tectonic Framework of Europe in Salminen, R. (editor) (2005) Geochemical Atlas of Europe part 1, Espoo, Geological Survey of Finland. ISBN 951-690-913-2. Retrieved 2015-06-29.
- Avalonia and the Cadomian belt
- Treloar P. J., Strachan R. A. (1990) Cadomian strike-slip tectonics in NE Brittany, Geological Society, London, Special Publicationsm Vol. 51, pp. 151 – 168
