= Mid-German Crystalline High =

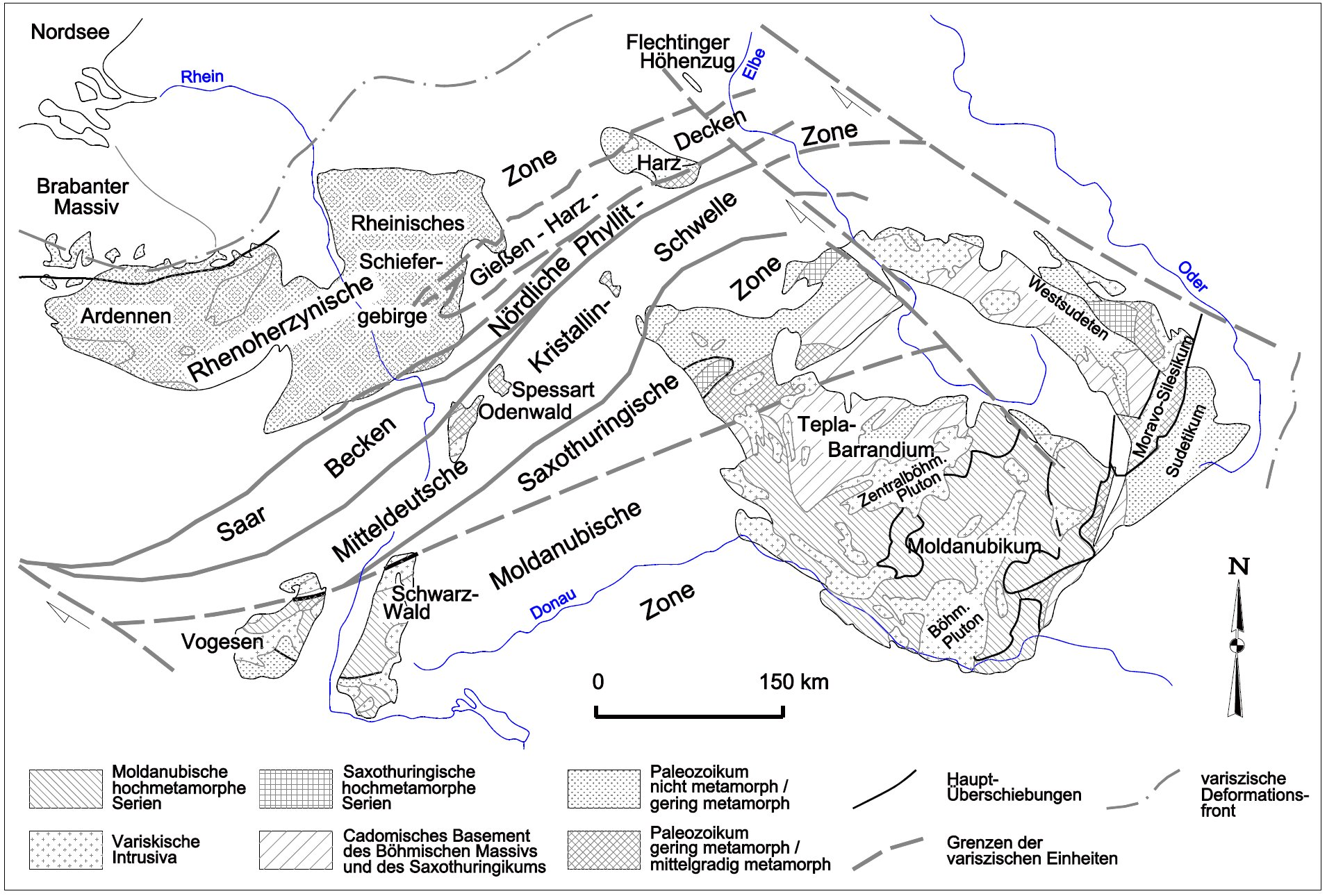
Structural map of central Europe, showing the positions of the Hercynian massifs and the zones in which the basement rocks can be divided.

The Mid-German Crystalline High (or Mid-German High) is a structural high in the Paleozoic geology of Germany. The high forms a northeast-southwest oriented zone through Germany, but actual rock outcrops are sparse since Paleozoic basement rocks are in most of central Germany overlain by younger sedimentary rocks. The Mid-German Crystalline High crops out in the Odenwald, the Spessart, the northern Vosges and some small other massifs.

== Structure ==
The Mid-German Crystalline High forms the northern part of the Saxothuringian Zone of the Hercynian orogeny. To the northwest it is bounded by the Northern Phyllite Zone (slightly metamorphosed sediments of mid-Paleozoic age), part of the Rhenohercynian Zone. Southeast of the Mid-German High lies a zone where early to mid-Paleozoic sediments of the Saxothuringian Basin crop out, metamorphosed during the Hercynian orogeny. Supposedly, during the mid-Paleozoic (Devonian and early Carboniferous) the Mid-German Crystalline High formed an area were not much deposition took place, perhaps an archipelago, between two marine or oceanic basins (the Rhenohercynian Basin to the north, the Saxothuringian Basin to the south). Some authors assume the northern basin's oceanic crust subducted beneath the Mid-German High.

== Lithologies ==
The zone consists of Proterozoic orthogneisses and early Paleozoic volcanic (amphibolites with MORB-protoliths and tuffs) and sedimentary (pelites, calcareous schists and marbles) rocks that were metamorphosed at high grade during the Hercynian orogeny (up to amphibolite facies). These rocks were intruded by two generations of plutons: Silurian to Early Devonian (440-400 million years old) granitoids and middle Carboniferous (Hercynian, 340-325 million years old) granites.

== See also ==
- Geology of Germany

== Bibliography ==
- Franke, W.; 2000: The mid-European segment of the Variscides: tectonostratigraphic units, terrane boundaries and plate tectonic evolution, in: Franke, W.; Haak, V.; Oncken, O. & Tanner, D. (eds.); Orogenic Processes, Quantification and Modelling in the Variscan Belt, Geological Society of London, Special Publications 179, pp. 35-61.
- Oncken, O.; 1997: Transformation of a magmatic arc and an orogenic root during oblique collision and its consequences for the evolution of the European Variscides (Mid-German Crystalline Rise), Geologische Rundschau 86, pp. 2-20. DOI: 10.1007/s005310050118
- Ziegler, P.A.; 1990: Geological Atlas of Western and Central Europe, Shell Internationale Petroleum Maatschappij BV (2nd ed.), ISBN 90-6644-125-9.
