= Bojite =

Bojite is a variety of gabbro characterized by the presence of plagioclase feldspar and primary hornblende and absence of clinopyroxene typically associated with gabbroic rocks. It was initially defined by geologist E. Weinschenk in 1898. The term "bojite" has been superseded by the usage of "hornblende gabbro" as defined by the 2002 IUGS Subcommission on the Systematics of Igneous Rocks for rocks composed of plagioclase + hornblende and <5% pyroxene.
