= Bohemian Massif =

Central European geological structure

Coordinates: 50°08′N 14°59′E

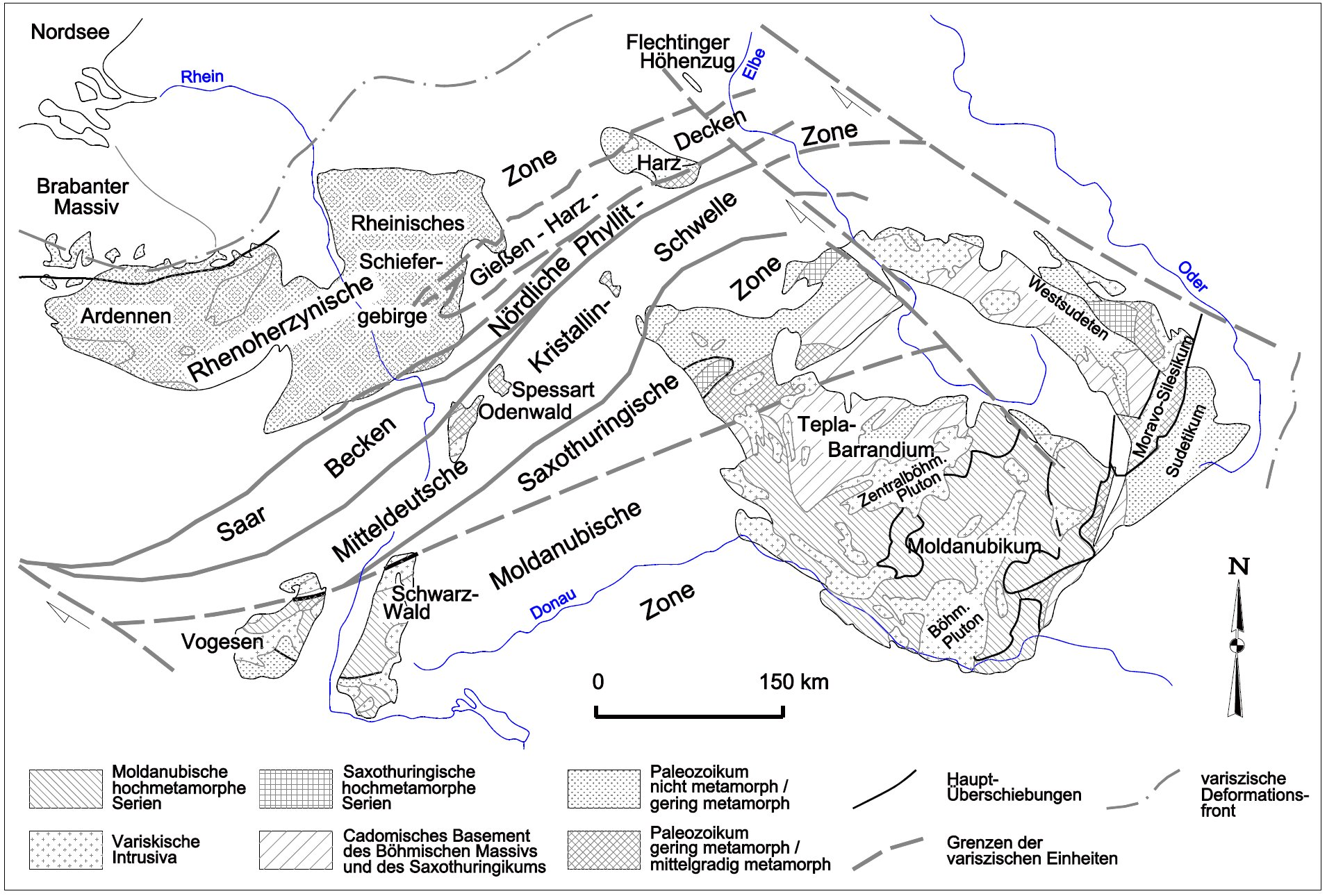
Map of Variscan massifs and structures in Central Europe. The Bohemian Massif is situated to the right.

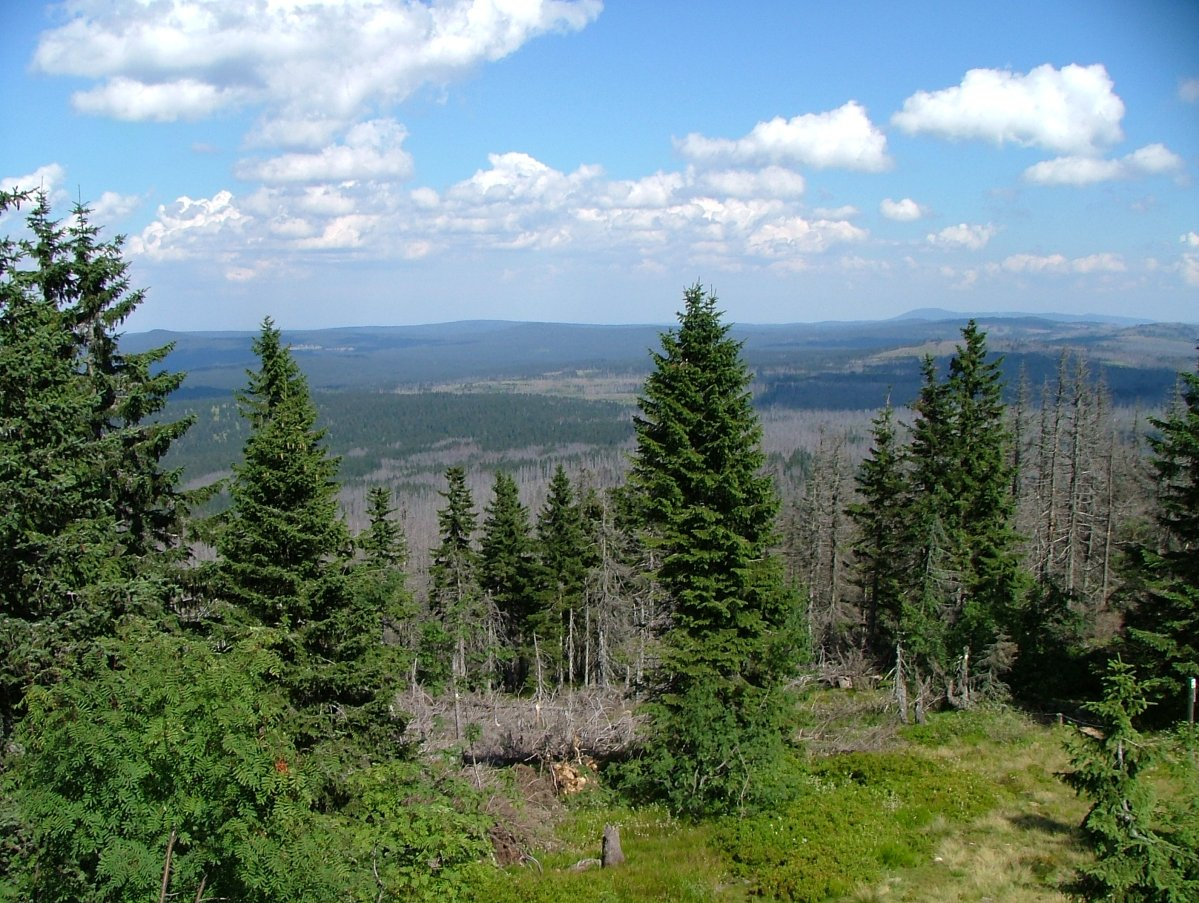
Gentle hills in the Bavarian Forest, a typical landscape

The Bohemian Massif (Czech: Česká vysočina or Český masiv; German: Böhmische Masse or Böhmisches Massiv) is a geomorphological province in Central Europe. It is a large massif stretching over most of the Czech Republic, eastern Germany, southern Poland and northern Austria.

The massif encompasses a number of mittelgebirges and consists of crystalline rocks, which are older than the Permian (more than 300 million years old) and therefore deformed during the Variscan Orogeny.

Parts of the Sudetes within the Bohemian Massif, Giant Mountains in particular, stand out from the ordinary mittelgebirge pattern by having up to four distinct levels of altitudinal zonation, glacial cirques, small periglacial landforms and an elevation significantly above the timber line.

== Geomorphological divisions ==
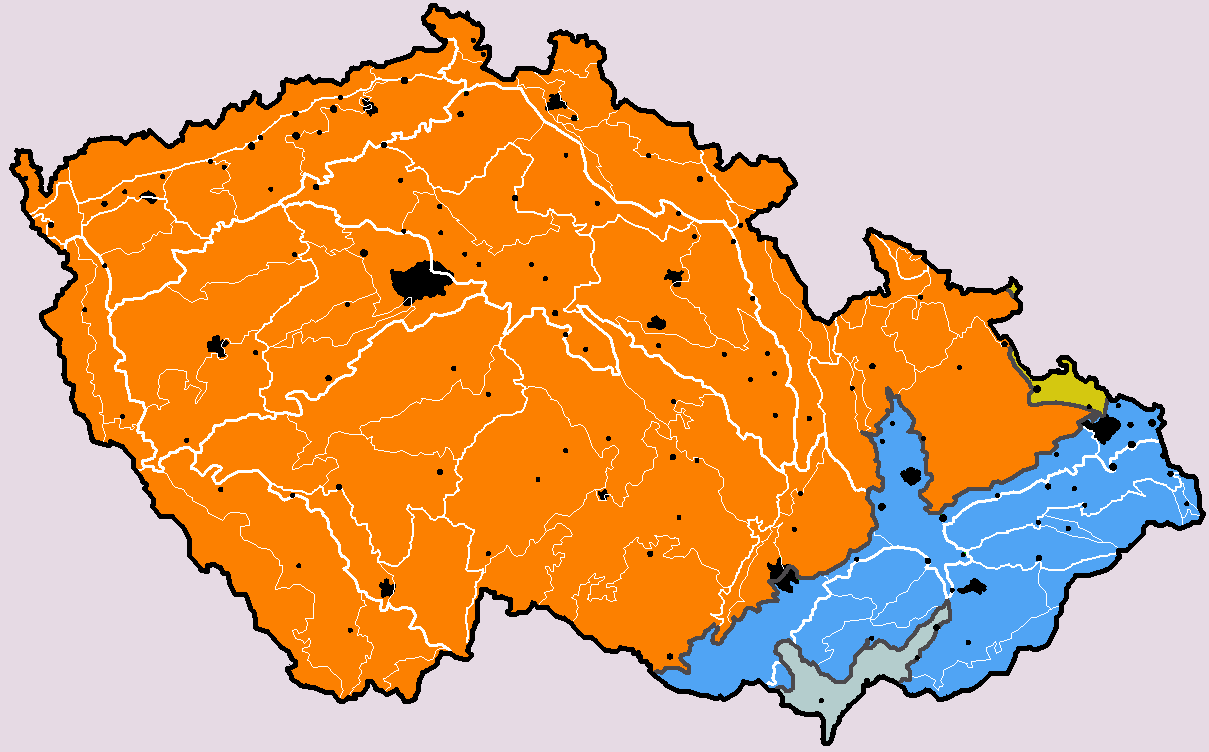
Geomorphological provinces of the Czech Republic Bohemian Massif North European Plain Western Carpathians Western Pannonian Basin

The Bohemian Massif is a province within the Hercynian Forest subsystem. It borders with four provinces: Western Carpathians on the east, Eastern Alps on the south, North European Plain on the north, and Central Uplands on the west. The Bohemian Massif is further divided into six subprovinces:

- Sudetes; includes among others mountain ranges of Lusatian Mountains, Jizera Mountains, Giant Mountains, Owl Mountains, Stołowe Mountains, Hrubý Jeseník
- Ore Mountains; includes mountain ranges of Ore Mountains, Elbe Sandstone Mountains and Central Bohemian Upland
- Bohemian Forest; includes mountain ranges of Bohemian Forest, Bavarian Forest, Upper Palatine Forest, Gratzen Mountains and the Granite and Gneiss Plateau
- Bohemian-Moravian; includes Bohemian-Moravian Highlands and Brno Highlands
- Poberoun; includes the Brdy mountain range and the Prague Plateau
- Bohemian Table; includes the lowlands around the Elbe River

== Geography ==
The landscapes in the Bohemian Massif are mostly dominated by rolling hills. North of the river Danube the topography is characterized by gentle valleys and broad, flat ridges and hilltops. The highest peaks on the Czech-Austrian borderline are the Plöckenstein (Plechý, 1,378 m) and Sternstein (1,125 m). The bedrock of acid gneiss and granite is weathered to brown soil (cambisols). In flat areas and valleys the groundwater had more influence on soil formation; in such places gley soils may be found too.

As in the other Variscan mittelgebirges of Central Europe, the valleys are more irregular and less pronounced as in the relatively young fold and thrust belt of the Alps. The plateaus are orographically more similar in morphology. Water gaps in the Bohemian Massif are the Wachau, the Strudengau and the valley of the Danube from Vilshofen over Passau and the Schlögener Schlinge till Aschach.

== Geology ==
=== Tectonic subdivision ===
The internal tectonic structure of the Bohemian Massif was formed during the Variscan Orogeny. The Variscan Orogeny was a phase of mountain building and accretion of terranes that resulted from the closing of the Rheic Ocean when the two paleocontinents Gondwana (in the south) and Laurussia (in the north) collided. Most of the Bohemian Massif is often supposed to belong to a terrane called Cadomia or Armorica, which also included the terranes of the Armorican Massif in western France. This supposedly formed a microcontinent that became sandwiched between the large continental masses north and south. The result of the Variscan Orogeny was that almost all continental mass became united in a supercontinent called Pangaea. From the Permian period onward the Variscan mountain belt eroded and became partly covered by younger sediments, with the exception of Variscan massifs like the Bohemian Massif.

The basement rocks and terranes of the Bohemian Massif are tectonically part of three main structural zones, which differ in metamorphic degrees, lithologies and tectonic styles. This tectonic subdivision was formed during the Variscan Orogeny.

- The Saxothuringian Zone forms the northern parts of the massif. The northernmost part of the Saxothuringian Zone is the Mid-German Crystalline High, which is but rarely exposed in the Bohemian Massif. The northern boundary of this zone is assumed to be the Rheic suture which separates the former continental masses of Gondwana and Laurussia.
- The Moldanubian Zone forms the central parts of the massif and has generally a higher grade than the Saxothuringian Zone. It includes the Teplá-Barrandian Terrane, which is assumed to have been a small microcontinent.
- The southeast of the massif forms a third unit, the Moravian-Silesian Zone. This zone includes the Brunovistulian Block, an allochthonous unit thrusted over the Moravo-Silesian crystalline rocks. Contradictionary to most parts of the Bohemian Massif, the Brunovistulian was originally part of or close to the southern part of Laurussia.

== Resources ==
Unlike other Variscan massifs in Central Europe the Bohemian Massif is not very rich in ores. The Harz Mountains further north in Germany, which are geologically part of the Rhenohercynian Zone, have more ore deposits. On the other hand, the Bohemian massif has many quarries where granite, granodiorite and diorite are won for use as decorative building stone.
