= Armorican terrane =

Microcontinent or group of continental fragments rifted away from Gondwana

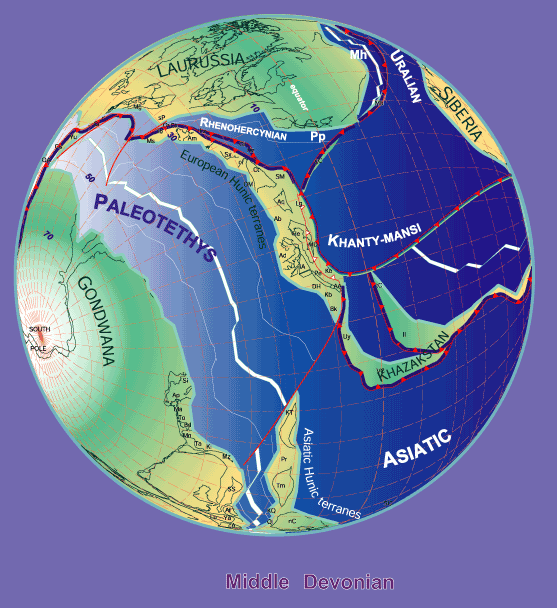
Plate reconstruction during the late Devonian, showing the location of Armorica (Am) within the proposed Hun superterrane

Geological map of the Armorican Massif, the main outcrop of the Armorican terrane

The Armorican terrane, Armorican terrane assemblage, or simply Armorica, was a microcontinent or group of continental fragments that rifted away from Gondwana towards the end of the Silurian and collided with Laurussia towards the end of the Carboniferous during the Variscan orogeny. The name is taken from Armorica, the Gaulish name for a large part of northwestern France that includes Brittany, as this matches closely to the present location of the rock units that form the main part of this terrane.

== Extent ==
The main exposures of the Armorican terrane are found throughout Brittany, the Channel Islands, parts of Upper Normandy, forming the Armorican Massif. Other fragments thought to have originally formed part of the Armorican terrane assemblage include rock units exposed in the Vosges, Black Forest, Bohemian Massif and most of the Iberian peninsula.

== History ==
All of the fragments that make up the Armorican terrane are thought to have originally formed part of the northern margin of Gondwana. Rifting initiated in the Cambrian to Ordovician although the terrane was still close enough to Gondwana to be affected by the Andean-Saharan glaciation during the late Ordovician. Complete separation from Gondwana, across the developing Paleotethys Ocean, is thought to have occurred towards the end of the Silurian. At this time Armorica was separated from Laurussia by the Rheic Ocean. One possible model includes Armorica as part of the Hun superterrane, while other show it moving separately. The Rheic Ocean closed during the Devonian and early Carboniferous, as the oceanic crust was subducted. The Variscan orogeny marks the final closure of the Rheic Ocean as the various continental fragments, including Armorica, collided with Laurussia towards the end of the Carboniferous.
