= Geology of Jersey =

Geological description of the Jersey Island

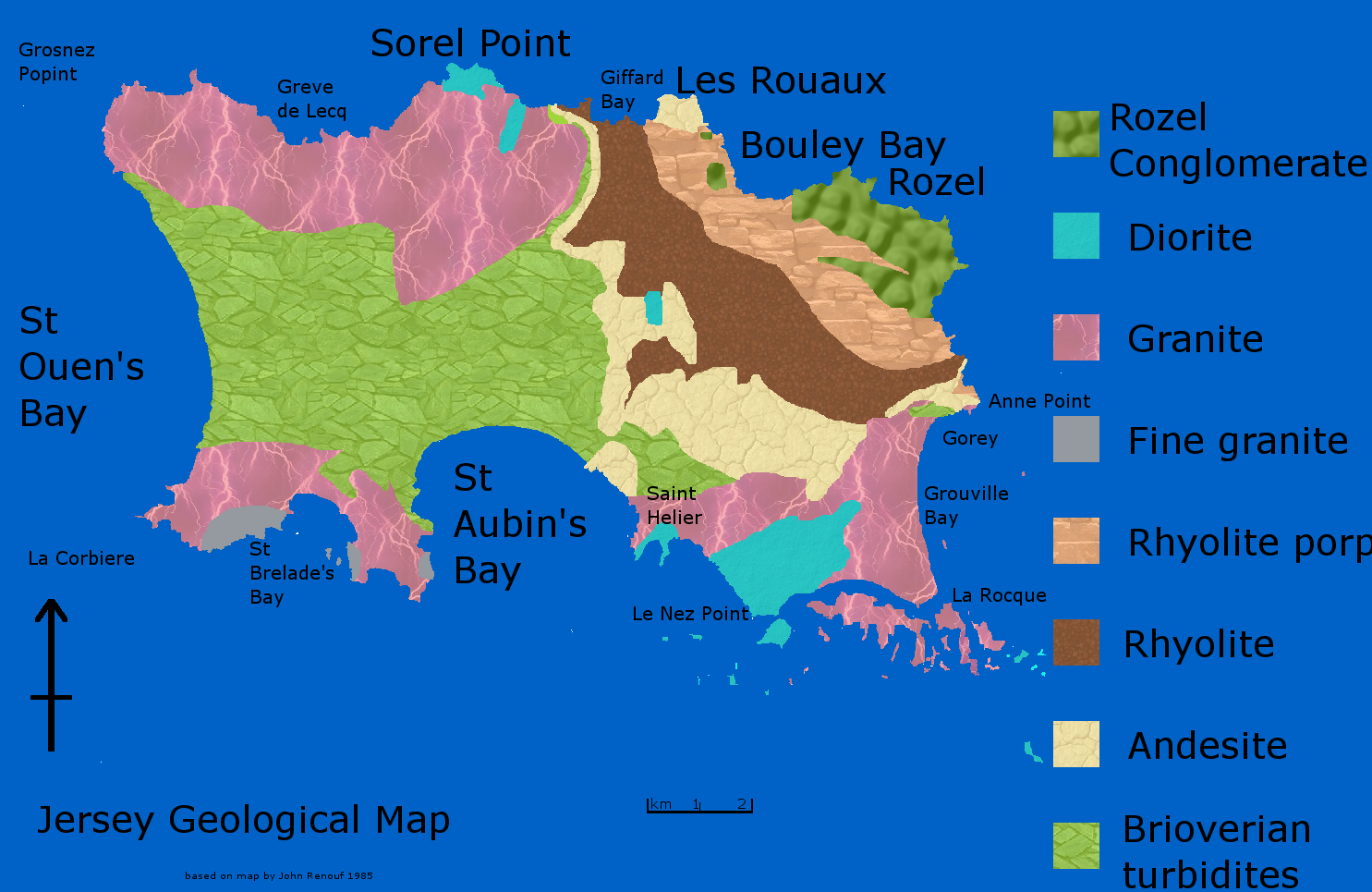
Geology of Jersey

The geology of Jersey is characterised by the Late Proterozoic Brioverian volcanics, the Cadomian Orogeny, and only small signs of later deposits from the Cambrian and Quaternary periods. The kind of rocks go from conglomerate to shale, volcanic, intrusive and plutonic igneous rocks of many compositions, and metamorphic rocks as well, thus including most major types.

== Brioverian sediments ==
Jersey Geological Timeline
← / Jersey Volcanic group; ← / end of ice age; ← / Granite in the north west and north west; ← / Granite in the south west; ← / Variscan Orogeny; ← / Cadomian Orogeny; ← / Brioverian Sedimentation; ← / Sturtian glaciation
An approximate time-scale of events in the Geological history of Jersey. Axis scale is in millions of years ago.

The Brioverian rocks were formed between 900 and 700 mya. They were named after Briovère, the native name for St. Lô, in Normandy, which is the first area these rocks were described from. They start with turbidites in the west, centre and south of Jersey, including at St Ouens Bay, and St Aubin's Bay. The Brioverian sedimentary rocks are all well bedded and were originally the mid and outer parts of a submarine fan. This constitutes the Jersey Shale Formation. The shale is found at Gorey Harbour in the east coast, and La Belle Hougue Point, and Le Mont Mado granite has an occurrence. The shale is more easily eroded, and this has affected the shape of the island by the concave St Ouens's Bay and St Aubin's Bay. The deepest valleys (Valley of St. Peter and St. Lawrence) are cut into this soft rock. Other sediments associated with the shale are mudstone, and fine grained sandstone. Various sedimentary structures include flute and bounce castes, ripple lamination, graded bedding, cross bedding, and boudinage. The shale layers have been identified as Association IV in the submarine fan.

The sandstone is Association III of the submarine fan. Greywacke is termed Association IV along with the shale. It is found in the same areas as the shale. In an analysis of the greywacke it has fragments with 70% quartz, 10% to 15% plagioclase and microcline feldspar, 2% dark iron containing minerals, with carbon flakes, in a matrix of 10 to 20% clay. The minerals contained are very diverse indicating a broad source area.

Conglomerate, termed Association I from the upper parts of the fan, is found in lenticular bodies near St Peter's Valley, at Gargate Mill. The pebbles in the conglomerate are of multiple kinds of rock. The granite intrusions at the boundary of the formation have caused metamorphism and intrusion by dykes.

In the L'Êtacq area, the metamorphism has produced spotted hornfels with a grey colour. The spots are darker, containing cordierite and biotite. At St. Ouën's Bay the metamorphosis of greywacke has made hornblende-hornfels. Regional metamorphism has converted the shale to a low greenschist facies, where clay is converted to chlorite.

The interpretation of this area is that is a part of the north facing continental slope of Armorica facing a subduction zone, where the Celtic oceanic plate was converging and descending in the trench. The sediments were carried by rivers from the Le Vast Arc, a strip of land oriented east north east, that lay to the south of Jersey. The sea at this time was termed l' Océan de la Manche.

== Brioverian volcanics ==
These sediments were uplifted and are overlaid by volcanic rocks of the Jersey Volcanic Group around 530 Mya. The magma came from the subduction zones below and to the north of the island. Andesite from St. Saviour's Andesite Formation is in the centre and in the north at Les Rouaux. It is coloured grey and includes some basalt and pyroclastic fallout such as tuff and agglomerate. Porphyritic andesite is dark grey with white crystals of plagioclase feldspar embedded. Outcrops occur on the coast at Giffards Bay on the north coast and Vicard Point on the east coast. The volcanoes were to the north east and south. Vicard Tuff contains bombs. The Long Echet Tuff contains large crystals of quartz and feldspar and strands of quartz. Les Rouaux Agglomerate and L' Homme Mort Agglomerate contain fragments of the surrounding rocks including shale and andesite embedded in a feldspar matrix. The Les Rouaux Agglomerate also contains pumice. This was eroded before the next phase of volcanism.

Porphoritic rhyolite of St. John's Rhyolite Formation is found to the north east of the centre. It contains banded flows and ignimbrite. Totally it is 950 meters thick. It contains shards of glass and pumice. Different flows exits with sections called Bonne Nuit Ignimbrite followed by Frémont Ignimbrite on the north coast. They contain xenoliths of the andesite and shale found in Jersey. Also there are local mudstone and conglomerate deposited on the flows. The conglomerate is called L'Homme Mort Conglomerate.

The Jeffrey's Leap Ignimbrite is overlaid by the Anne Port Ignimbrite named after locations on the east coast. The Trinity Ignimbrite is a purple tuff near Les Grands Vaux, inland.

Fine grained rhyolite of Bouley Rhyolite Formation occurs even further to the north east. This is 430 metres thick. At Giffard Bay are Gifford Rhyolite, Gifford Andesite, Gifford Ignimbrite and Gifford Tuffs. Les Platons Rhyolite top this off. These rocks contain xenoliths and tuff deposits from lakes and streams. The Les Platons Rhyolite contains spherulites. Spherulites are also found at Les Hurets on Bouley Bay. At Bouley Bay there are three units of ignimbrite: the Lower Bouley Ignimbrite, Middle Bouley Ignimbrite and Upper Bouley Ignimbrite. These contain flow banding and spherulites up to 10 cm and eutaxitic and fiamme textures. The Anne Port Rhyolite is the bottom unit on the east coast. This is massive but columnar jointed. It shows flow banding. It resembles the Giants Causeway at La Crête Point.

Le Havre de Fer Beach has an outcrop of columnar rhyolite that has been separated by faulting from the rest of the units. North of Archirondel Round Tower there are three more flows stacked on top of each other called Archirondel Ignimbrite, Dolmen Ignimbrite and St. Catherine's Ignimbrite. These are separated from each other by layers of tuff, and are coloured maroon by hematite. They consist of pumice, quartz crystals and feldspar in a feldspar rich matrix.

== Cadomian Orogeny ==
Intrusions were formed during the Cadomian Orogeny around 700 to 500 million years ago. In this orogeny the rocks were first crushed and folded with East West pressure, then later they were compressed in the north south direction. Gabbro is found at Sorel Point. This rock can be observed to transition into diorite by changes in the mineral content and texture. Layered gabbro has also been changed into diorite at Le Nez point, the southernmost point of the main island. The diorite is emplaced at and near Sorel point, and at several places along the south coast east of Saint Helier. It also is found on the south east tidal rock platform.

Granite intrudes into the north west, south west and south east. The south west granite also includes porphyries and some fine grained sections.

The south west granites are 550 – 480 mya, and has three intrusions. The intrusions are called Corbière Granite, La Moye Granite, and Beau Port Granite. They are coloured pale to deep red. The north west area was intruded 465 to 426 million years ago with four intrusions. One of these intrusions contained the gabbro and diorite. These granites are coloured grey-pink and orange, with the gabbro a dark grey, and the diorite speckled grey.

There are also pink and red aplite veins in the igneous complexes up to 5 cm wide. The aplite is the lowest melting remanent of the granite magma, that is poor in volatiles. The aplite minerals include tourmaline, topaz and fluorite. At St Brelade's Bay there are two aplogranites: Beau Port Granite and La Moye Granite. This is coloured yellow brown to pink and contains fine crystals of perthite, and oligoclase and quartz, coloured by limonite. Other parts more rich in volatiles have formed pegmatites featuring milky quartz and pink orthoclase.

The north west area was intruded 465 to 426 million years ago with four intrusions. The magma came from a volcanic arc. One of these intrusions contained the gabbro and diorite. The granites are coloured grey-pink and orange, with the gabbro a dark grey, and the diorite speckled grey. The main intrusion is the St. Mary's Granite 438 million years ago. One other intrusion was an aplogranite called Mont Mado granite, or Red Granite solidified 426 million years ago. This is mostly made from fine grained quartz and Perthite, but is coloured red yellow and brown. A third porphyritic granite is 465 million years ago.

The south east granites moved into the south east about the same time. The components here are called Fort Regent/Elizabeth Castle Granophyre, Dicq Granite, Longueville Granite, and La Roque Granite.

The plutonic rocks are not foliated, showing that the orogeny was near completion at the time they formed.

== Rozel Conglomerate ==
The land here was uplifted and eroded in the Cambrian. A coarse conglomerate known as Rozel Conglomerate was washed in by a flash flood flowing from somewhere to the north of the island during the Cambrian to Ordovician time period. This conglomerate is on the north east cape at Rozel. The pebbles consist of andesite, rhyolite, granite and shale. The pebbles range from 1 cm to 60 cm, and are quite irregular. The conglomerate bed is above a bed of red sandstone and mudstone which has pits, probably being rain drop marks, and also has polygonal shaped cracks. Apart from the main outcrop, the conglomerate is also found in smaller areas at Les Hurets Valley, west of the Bouley Bay and at La Pierre de Fételle. The conglomerate is estimated to be Ordovician in age.

== Variscan Orogeny ==
Sinistral tear faults have affected the rock.

The Variscan Orogeny left a smaller print on the island, with the intrusion of some dykes, and some folding and jointing that affected the island's rocks including the Rozel Conglomerate. During the Mesozoic and Tertiary, Jersey was part the north-west edge of Armorica. The dykes included a swarm of dolerite dykes, also lamprophyre, feldspar porphyry and aplite.

There is a known acid dyke of rhyolitic composition on the east side of Noirmont headland. This is 1 metre wide and coloured light grey to pink. It has an east–west strike. Porhyritic microgranite dykes occur below Le Saut Jeffroi, and south of Le Mont Orgueil. These have a NNE strike.

The aplite dykes are one to two metres wide.

There are two sets of lamprophyre dykes. Biotite lamprophyres (minettes) are oriented in the north west direction. They are coloured brown, and are up to 1 metre wide. They contain orthoclase. Hornblende lamprophyre (spessarites) contain plagioclase, coloured light brown and are oriented north–south. A hornblende lamprophyre dyke in the Rozel Conglomerate is dated at 435 million years ago.

The Jersey Main Dyke Swarm consists of dolerite dykes intruded into the South East Igneous complex. Some dolerite dykes have a porphyry centre. The strike is north-west, and the direction is vertical. Augite and labradorite are found in these dolerites.

In the north-west there are sills of dolerite.

== Tertiary ==
During the Eocene limestone was deposited in the sea around Jersey, but none is actually on the island.

During the Tertiary the surface of the island was a plain at 60 to 130 metres above sea level.

== Quaternary ==
The high surface has been eaten into by cliffs dropping down to 8 metres. These have been formed during the Quaternary when the sea level was around 8 metres above the current sea level. There are also raised beaches at 18 and 30 metres above current sea level. During the glacial periods valleys were eroded deeply below the sea level These raised beaches are found at Portelet Bay, Giffard Bay, and Belcroute Bay. Flint is found amongst the pebbles on these beaches, and this is derived from chalk deposits only found underwater.

La Cotte de St Brelade has a Neanderthal rock shelter which was inhabited 200000 years ago by hunters of woolly mammoth and rhinoceros amongst other animals.

During the Quaternary Devensian glaciation, loess was deposited, blown in by wind from the west. The loess has formed thick deposits on the island interior and combined with periglacial frost shattered rock fragments sliding down the cliffs to form head which have themselves been eroded to form cliffs from 3 to 12 metres high. At Belcroute there is a more complex deposit of loess head on a raised beach deposit elevated at 8 metres, that sits on another loess deposit. Head occurs at the foot of cliffs along the north, north east and south west sides, and can also be found beneath wind blown sand at the bays of St. Ouen, St. Aubin, St. Clement and the Royal Bay of Grouville. The thickest parts of loess are five metres deep at St Clements and at La Hougue Bie on the eastern plateau.

Peat occurs in the valleys. At Quetivel Mill in St. Peter's Valley there is peat dated to 7600 BC which contains pollen from boreal forest.

The island was only separated from the continent of Europe by rising sea levels about 5000 BC during the new Stone Age.

There are several sea caves. A notable cave is the Le Creux du Vis. This cave has a tunnel going in from the beach at the base of the cliff, and a crater shaped opening with steep rocky sides above.

The only fossils date from the Quaternary, and are found in raised beaches, peat and clay. Mammuthus primigenius bones have been found at La Cotte de St. Brelade along with deer bones. Mollusk shells are found in the Loess and beach deposits. A submerged forest in St. Ouën's Bay between L'Ouzière slipway and Le Port Slipway has stumps of Birch and Alder (Betula sp and Alnus sp) from 1980 BC. Legends record that the sea encroached on the forest in the fifteenth century.

== Economic geology ==
At Le Pulec there is a small deposit of lead and zinc that was mined in the late 19th century, but the venture was unsuccessful. There are also some other small unmined mineral veins, such as ankerite, molybdenite and haematite.

Rocks have been used in Neolithic times to build dolmens. These are found at La Hougue Bie in St. Saviour and Le Mont Ubé dolmen, St. Clément and La Pouquelaye de Faldouet and Le Couperon.

China clay quarries used to be in what is now Handois reservoirs. Bricks have also been made from clay from St. Saviour. La Société Jersiaise is making a brick archive.

=== Quarrying ===
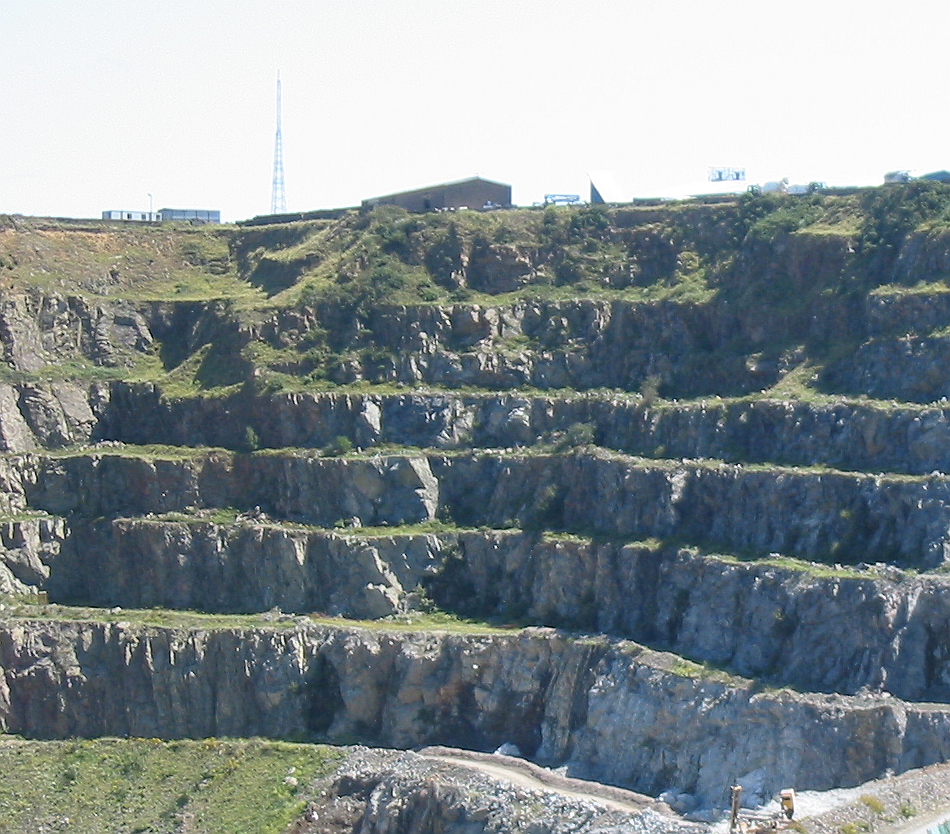
Ronez Quarry, Saint John

Granite quarrying still occurs in three quarries in the north west at Ronez, Gigoulande (by Granite Products company) and La Saline. The La Saline company produces decorative stone for building. The other two quarries produce aggregate for roads and concrete and a product called hoggin. There are many other disused or abandoned quarries that have been used for stone to make the buildings, castles, and piers on the island.

=== Sand ===
Sand mining takes place at St. Ouen's Bay in the west by Simon's Sand and Gravel, and formerly at Grouville in the east.

=== Water ===
Ground water is found in rock fractures and to a limited extend in porous rocks, in the upper 40 meters. Ground water is irregular, with some perched aquifers and vertical screens preventing underground flow. The water underground is young (as determined by isotope analysis), replenished from the surface from local rain, and not by underground streams from Normandy.

=== Earthquakes ===
Earth tremors occur more commonly near Jersey that other areas in the Channel Islands, with magnitudes up to 3. The epicentres are mostly on the sea floor to the west, south and east.

== Study ==
La Société Jersiaise has a geology section that studies, presents talks, and tours of the geology of the island.

== Geophysics ==
The tidal range is high at 13 meters, exposing a wide rock platform around Jersey. Western Jersey sedimentary rocks are underlain by shallow granite, and in eastern Jersey there is a high in the gravity field near Grande Charriere, which could be due to gabbro.
