= Hesperian Massif =

Pre-Mesozoic core of the Iberian Peninsula

The Hesperian Massif (left) along other Hercynian structures in Western Europe

The Hesperian Massif (also known as the Iberian, Hesperic, or Hercynian Massif, or Meseta block) is the pre-Mesozoic core of the Iberian Peninsula. Roughly covering the western half of the Peninsula, it includes all its Precambrian and Paleozoic materials and it is limited by the Cantabrian Sea to the North, the Atlantic Ocean to the West, the Guadalquivir sedimentary basin to the South. The western part features Paleozoic materials, while the east part features basins covered by Tertiary deposits.

The outline of the massif is formed by geological units such as the Ollo de sapo, the Cantabrian zone, the Central Iberian Zone, the catazonal complexes (probably Precambrian age) in north-western Spain and northern Portugal, the Pedroches batholith, the Ossa-Morena Zone, the South-Portuguese Zone, the Narcea series and the West Asturian–Leonese zone.
