= Armorican Massif =

Geologic massif that covers a large area in the northwest of France

Coordinates: 48°N 3°W

Location of the Armorican Massif on a structural map of the north of France. Hercynian massifs are olive coloured.

Geologic map of the Armorican Massif and surrounding areas.

The Armorican Massif (French: Massif armoricain, pronounced [masif aʁmɔʁikɛ̃]) is a geologic massif that covers a large area in the northwest of France, including Brittany, the western part of Normandy and the Pays de la Loire. It is important because it is connected to Dover on the British side of the English Channel and there has been tilting back and forth that has controlled the geography on both sides.

Its name comes from the old Armorica, a Gaul area between the rivers Loire and Seine. The massif is composed of metamorphic and magmatic rocks that were metamorphosed and/or deformed during the Hercynian or Variscan orogeny (400 to 280 million years ago) and the earlier Cadomian orogeny (650 to 550 million years ago). The region was uplifted when the Bay of Biscay opened during the Cretaceous period. The Cantabrian Mountains and the Armorican Massif were then rift shoulders of the Bay of Biscay.

The competent old rocks of the Armorican Massif have been eroded to a plateaulike peneplain. The highest summit, the Mont des Avaloirs (Mayenne département), is just 417 m (1,368 ft) above sea level. The western part of the Armorican Massif (which covers Brittany) are the Monts d'Arrée.

== Geology ==
During the Neoproterozoic, older parts of the Armorican Massif formed the northern margin of the paleocontinent Gondwana. During the Paleozoic era, the Armorican Massif was part of the microcontinent Armorica, which probably also included terranes found in the Vosges, Black Forest and Bohemian Massif further east. Armorica rifted off the northern margin of Gondwana somewhere during the Ordovician or Silurian periods to move northward and collide with Laurussia during the Hercynian orogeny.

The oldest rocks of the massif are Neoproterozoic sediments of the Brioverian Supergroup which were deformed and metamorphosed during the Cadomian orogeny. These are overlain by lower Paleozoic (Cambrian to Devonian) (meta-)sediments. The whole sequence was deformed, metamorphosed and intruded by felsic magmas during the Hercynian orogeny.

The massif is cut in three by two major late Hercynian southeast-northwest striking shear zones (the North and South Armorican Shear Zones). The divisions are simply called the North, Central and South Armorican Zones. Generally the north was less deformed during the Hercynian orogeny than the south. The South Armorican Zone is considered part of the core of the Hercynian orogeny, comparable to the Moldanubian Zone of southern Germany and central Europe. Late Hercynian granitoid bodies were intruded along the South Armorican Shear Zone. The northern parts of the Armorican Massif have less intrusive rocks, although a small zone in the northwest of Brittany (Léon Zone) forms an exception.

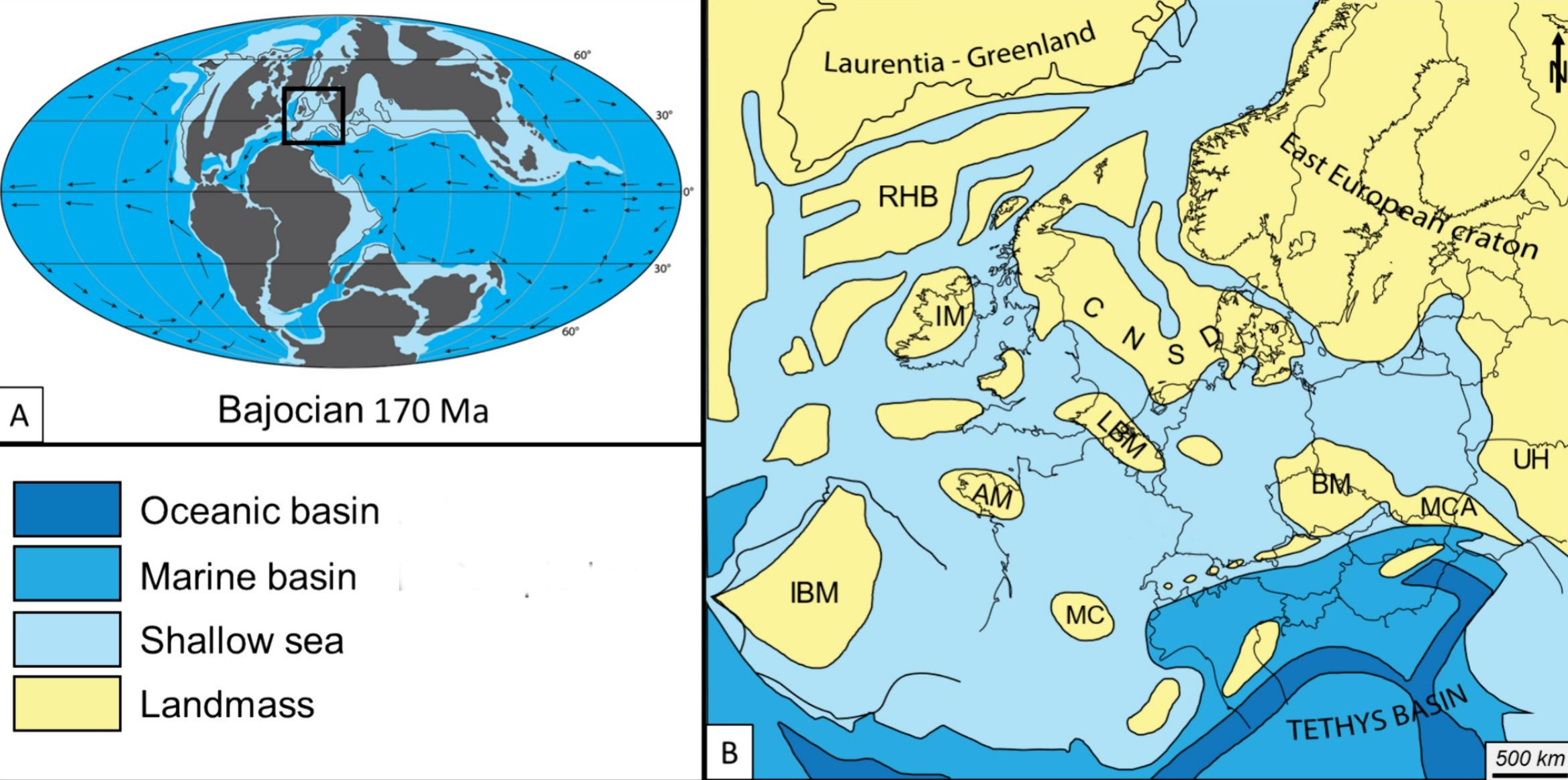
Map of Europe during the Bajocian stage of the Middle Jurassic, around 170 million years ago. The Amorican Massif is labelled "AM"

During the Jurassic, the Amorican Massif formed an island landmass isolated from the rest of France by shallow seas, and was inhabited by variety of dinosaurs, including stegosaurs, sauropods, as well as megalosaurid and possibly metriacanthosaurid theropods.

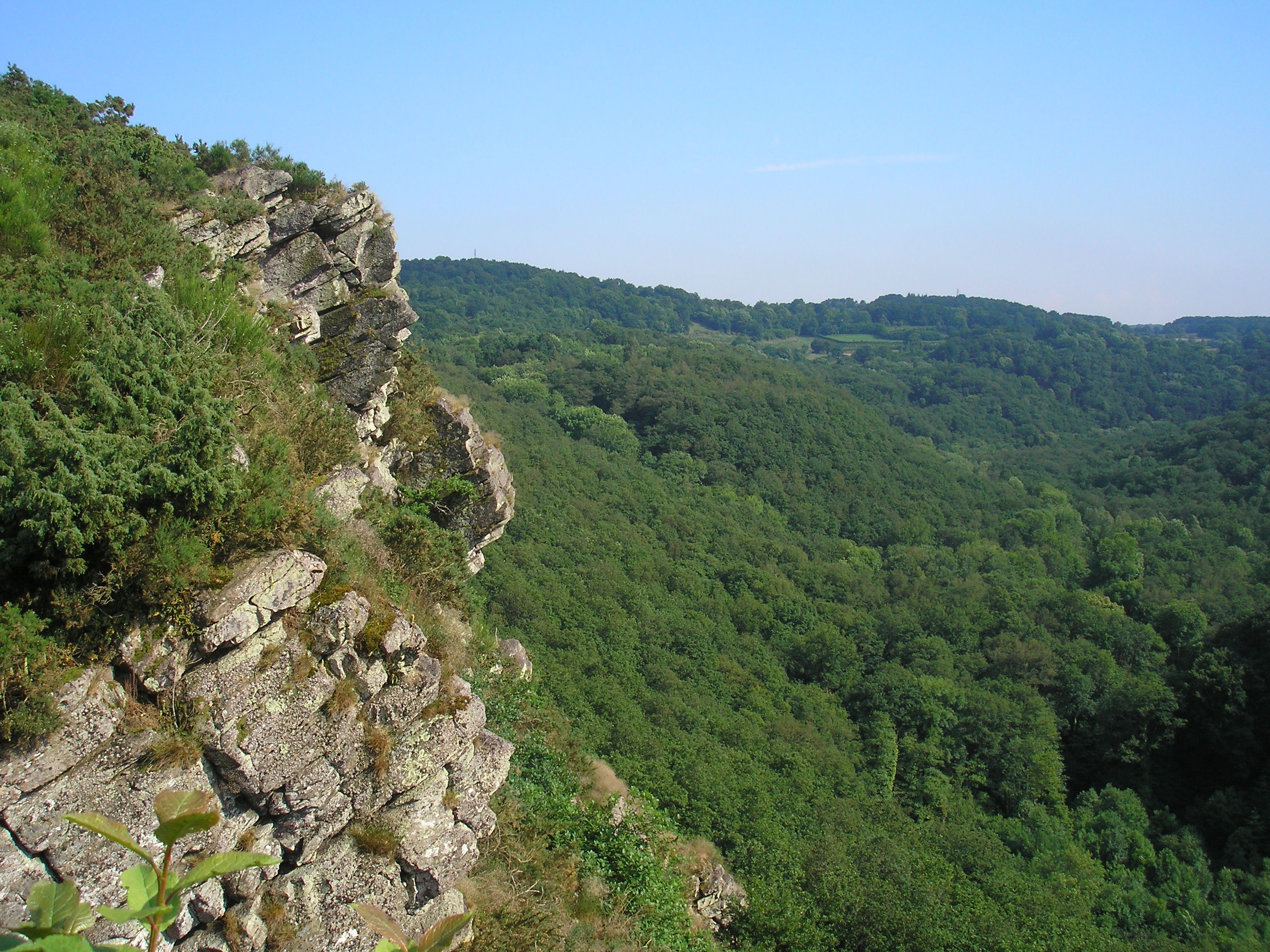
The site of the "Roche d'Oëtre".
