= Franz Kossmat =

Austrian-German geologist (1871–1938)

Franz Kossmat ( 22 August 1871 in Vienna – 1 December 1938 in Leipzig) was an Austrian-German geologist, for twenty years the director of the Geological Survey of Saxony under both the kingdom and the subsequent German Republic.

Kossmat was professor of Mineralogy and Geology at the Graz University of Technology. From 1913 to 1934 Kossmat was the director of the Geological Survey of Saxony and director of the Geological-Paleontological Institute of the University of Leipzig. In 1920 he presented the first gravity measures for middle Europe. It was published in 1921. In his life he published over twenty books himself, and collaborated on numerous others. He is most known for his work on isostasy, his opposition to Wegener's theories of continental drift, and for establishing a division of the European Variscides into several tectonic zones.

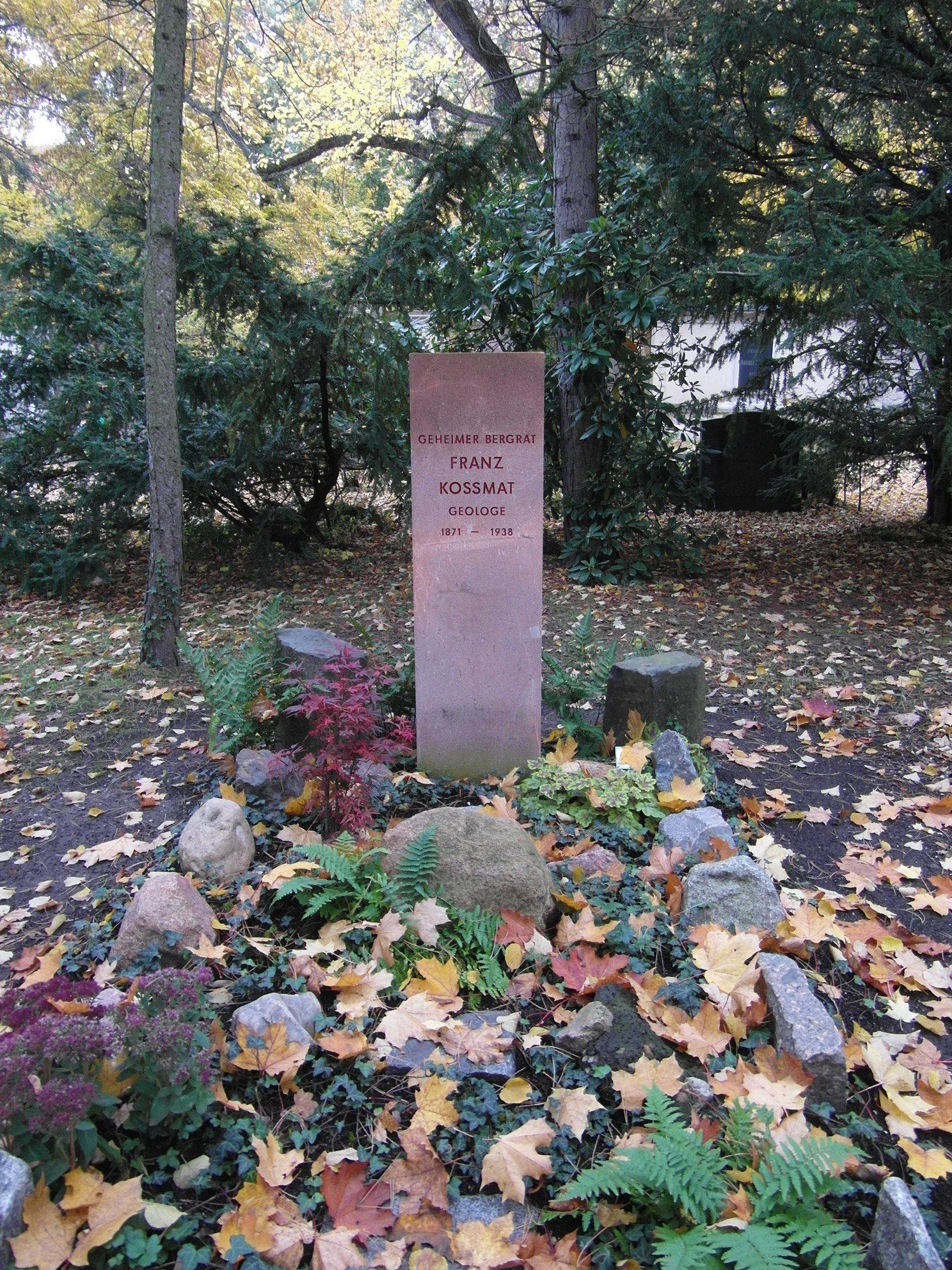
Grave site at Südfriedhof (Leipzig).

== Selected works ==
- -- (1906) Paläogeographie : (Geologische Geschichte der Meere und Festländer) (The Geological History of the Oceans and Continents) G.J. Göschen, OCLC 11245502, a second edition was published in 1916.
- -- (1921) Die mediterranen Kettengebirge in ihrer Beziehung zum Gleichgewichtszustande der Erdrinde (The Mediterranean Mountain Chain in its relationship with the Isostasy of the Earth’s Crust) Abh. d. Math.-Phys. Klasse der Sächs. Akad. d. Wiss. (Proceedings of the Mathematical-Physical Class of the Saxony Academy of Science), vol. 38, no. 2, Teubner, Leipzig
- -- (1927) Gliederung des varistischen Gebirgsbaus (Subdivision of the Variscan Mountains) Abh. Sächs. Geol. L.-A. (Proceedings of the Saxon Geological Survey), vol. 1, Leipzig.
- -- (1936) Paläogeographie und Tektonik (Paleogeography and Tectonics) Gebrüder Borntraeger, Berlin, OCLC 8420779
