= Rhenohercynian Zone =

Fold belt of west and central Europe, formed during the Hercynian orogeny

Most important structures and zones of the Hercynian orogeny in Europe.

The Rhenohercynian Zone or Rheno-Hercynian zone in structural geology describes a fold belt of west and central Europe, formed during the Hercynian orogeny (about 350 to 280 million years ago). The zone consists of folded and thrust Devonian and early Carboniferous sedimentary rocks that were deposited in a back-arc basin along the southern margin of the then existing paleocontinent Laurussia.

The Rhenohercynian Zone, named for the Rhine River and the Hercynian Forest of Antiquity, forms a narrow zone through western and central Europe, from Cornwall and Ireland in the west to the Harz mountains of central Germany in the east, including the Rhenish Massif (Ardennes, Taunus, Eifel and Hunsrück). The total length of this ancient basin (the Rhenohercynian Basin) could have been more than 2500 km. In the east the basin merges with the East-Silesian basin of southern Poland. The sedimentary rocks that were laid down in the basin are often weakly metamorphic (greenschist facies). Most geologists consider the South-Portuguese zone to be a continuation of the zone to the west.

Whether the Rhenohercynian Basin was a continuous feature or rather a string of temporaneously interconnected smaller basins is not well understood, because in many places the Devonian and Carboniferous rock strata are covered with younger deposits. Parts of the basin have their own names, like the Cornwall basin in Cornwall, the Munster basin in Ireland or the Rhenisch basin in Belgium and Germany.

== Tectonic structure and metamorphism ==
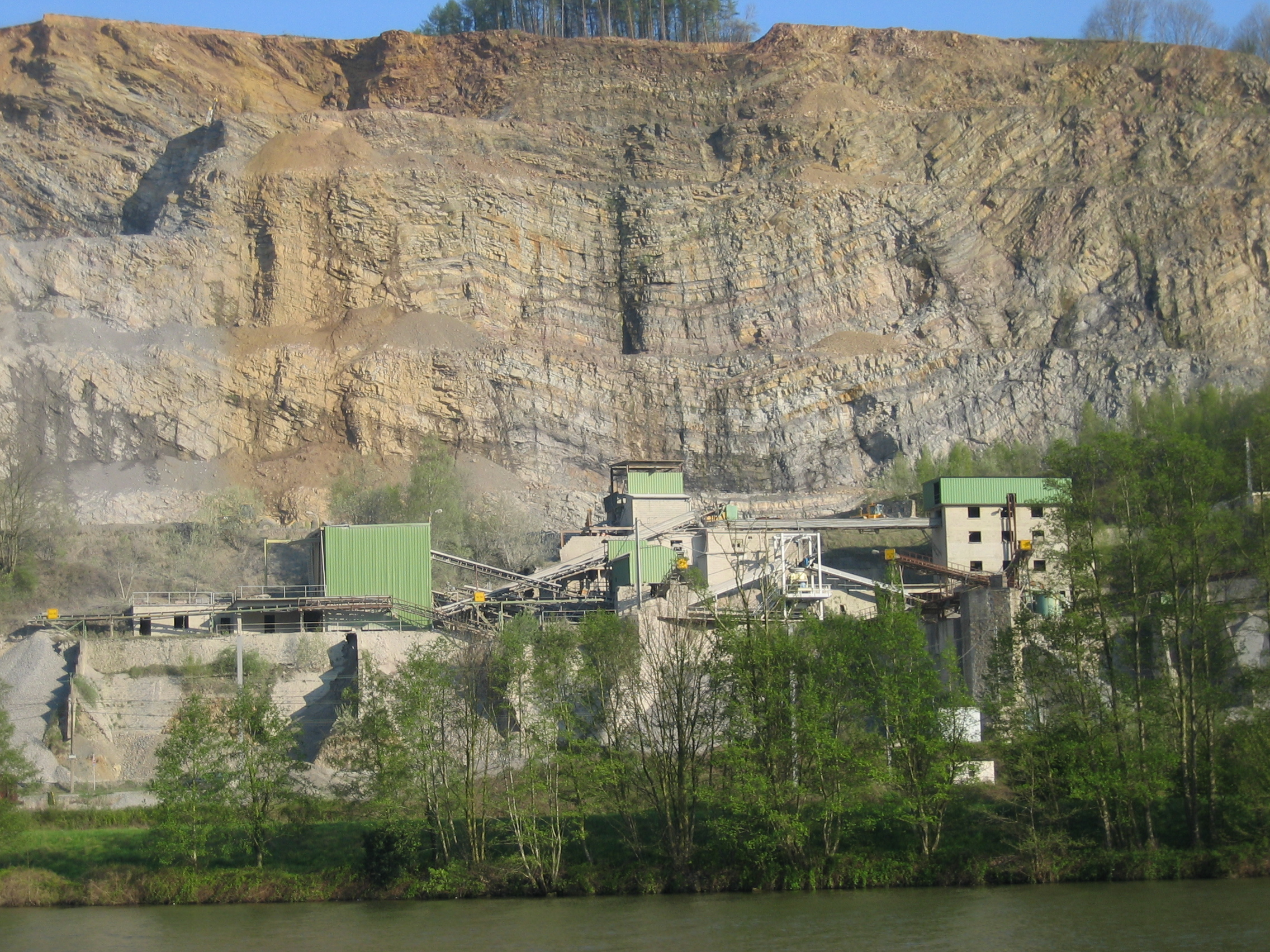
Syncline at a quarry at Profondeville, in the Belgian Ardennes. The rock strata are Upper Devonian sandstones and limestones, folded during the late phases of the Hercynian orogeny.

The Rhenohercynian Zone is a part of the northern foreland of the Hercynian orogeny. It has a lower grade of metamorphism than the Saxothuringian Zone to the south, meaning its rocks have generally been at smaller depths and under lower temperatures. The Subvariscan Zone north of the Rhenohercynian Zone was untouched by Hercynian metamorphism. During the Hercynian orogeny, the Rhenohercynian zone was folded and thrust internally. It was thrust over the foreland to the north (the London-Brabant Massif and other Avalonian terranes). From the south it was overthrust by the Mid-German Crystalline High, part of the Saxothuringian Zone.

The metamorphic grade or degree of metamorphism increases towards the south or southeast. The southern edge of the Rhenish Massif lies in the Northern Phyllite Zone, which has a higher grade than other parts of the zone.

== Geodynamic history ==
=== The Devonian basin ===
The Rhenohercynian basin was situated north of the Rheic Ocean, the ocean that spread between the continents of Laurussia (north) and Gondwana (south) from the Silurian onwards. The southern margin of Laurussia was formed during the Caledonian orogeny of the Silurian period, about 420 million years ago. In the Gedinnian/Lochkovian (Early Devonian) the southern part of the Caledonian mountain belt became a region of north–south extension. An elongated basin was formed parallel to the continental margin. It separated the London-Brabant Massif to the north from the Normannian and Mid-German Highs to the south.

In the Middle Devonian (from 390 million years ago) a subduction zone existed south of Laurussia, where oceanic lithosphere of the Rheic Ocean subducted beneath the Mid-German/Normannian highs. Volcanism above the subduction zone created a cordillera-type mountain chain, the Ligerian cordillera. In the Siegenian/Pragian and Emsian the Rhenohercynic basin was a back-arc basin behind this cordillera. Tectonic subsidence in a system of horsts and grabens together with basaltic volcanism resulted in the creation of new oceanic lithosphere. In the Middle Devonian a second basin, the Saxothuringian/Armorican basin, developed south of the Rhenohercynian basin. To the west some crustal convergence took place, and the Normannian High was partly thrust over the sedimentary basin fill of the Rhenohercynian basin.

=== Carboniferous compression ===
The Rhenohercynian basin disappeared when the continent Gondwana collided with Laurussia in the course of the Carboniferous period (the Hercynian orogeny). The sedimentary rocks in the basin were thrust in a series of piggyback basins over the northern foreland (the London-Brabant Massif). These rocks now form the folded sequences of Cornwall, the Ardennes, the Eifel and the Harz.

From the Frasnian age (380 million years ago) the mafic volcanism ended, and the basin came locally under compressional stress, which led to folding and thrusting in the sedimentary rocks. Somewhere near the end of the Devonian, a subduction zone developed under the Mid-German/Normannian highs and Rhenohercynian crust began to subduct. This was the short Bretonnic phase of the Hercynian orogeny. It was followed, from the Tournaisian (early Carboniferous, 355 million years ago) till the end of the Visean by a new period of extension.

During the Sudetic (main) phase of the Hercynian orogeny (330-320 million years ago, Late-Visean and Namurian/Serpukhovian) compressional tectonics had the upper hand again. In the Namurian age full-scale continental collision between Laurussia and Gondwana resulted in the destruction of the last oceanic crust of the basin. Its sedimentary fill was, however, not (totally) subducted but instead thrust northward. During the later part of the Carboniferous period (Westphalian and Stephanian) the Rhenohercynian zone formed the foreland of a relatively fast-developing Hercynian mountainbelt to the south. Isostatic subsidence of the foreland resulted in the development of a deep foreland basin. This filled with the products of erosion in the Hercynian mountains and the contemporaneously uplifted London-Brabant Massif to the north. During the Westphalian, the basin was completely filled and rose above sea level.

== Stratigraphy ==
The Rhenohercynian basin was filled with Devonian and Carboniferous sediments. Sedimentation was often disrupted by tectonic phases, but nevertheless the total thickness of the sediments can in some places be more than several kilometers.

When a foreland basin was formed in the Rhenohercynian zone, this was filled with upper Carboniferous (Pennsylvanian) flysch and molasse sediments. The Namurian is characterized by flysch, in the Westphalian this gradually grades into molasse and other continental deposits, among which the thick coal layers of the Belgian coal measures.

== Literature ==
- Franke, W.; 1989: "Tectonostratigraphic units in the Variscan belt of Central Europe", in: Dallmeyer (eds.): Terranes in the Circum-Atlantic Paleozoic orogens, Geological Society of America Special Paper 230, pp. 67–90.
- Franke, W.; 1992: "Phanerozoic structures and events in central Europe", in: Blundell, D. J.; Freeman, R. & Mueller, S. (eds.): A Continent Revealed - The European Geotraverse, 297 pp., Cambridge University Press, ISBN 0-521-42948-X, pp. 164–179.
- Franke, W.; 2000: "The mid-European segment of the Variscides: tectonostratigraphic units, terrane boundaries and plate tectonic evolution", in: Franke, W.; Haak, V.; Oncken, O. & Tanner, D. (eds.); Orogenic Processes, Quantification and Modelling in the Variscan Belt, Geological Society of London, Special Publications 179, pp. 35–61.
- Matte, P.; 2001: "The Variscan collage and orogeny (480±290 Ma) and the tectonic definition of the Armorica microplate: a review", Terra Nova 13, 122–128.
- von Raumer, J. F.; Stampfli, G. M. & Bussy, F.; 2003: "Gondwana-derived microcontinents – the constituents of the Variscan and Alpine collisional orogens", Tectonophysics 365, pp. 7–22.
- Walter, R.; 2003: Erdgeschichte – Die Entstehung der Kontinente und Ozeane, 325 pp., Walter de Gruyter, Berlin (5th printing), ISBN 3-11-017697-1.
- Ziegler, P. A.; 1990: Geological Atlas of Western and Central Europe, Shell Internationale Petroleum Maatschappij BV (2nd ed.), ISBN 90-6644-125-9.
