= Caledonian orogeny =

Mountain building event caused by the collision of Laurentia, Baltica and Avalonia

Location of the different branches of the Caledonian/Acadian belts at the end of the Caledonian orogeny (Early Devonian). Present-day coastlines are indicated in gray for reference. Later in geological history, the Atlantic Ocean opened and the different parts of the orogenic belt moved apart. See also Iapetus Suture and Trans-European Suture Zone.

The Caledonian orogeny was a mountain-building cycle recorded in the northern parts of the British Isles, the Scandinavian Caledonides, Svalbard, eastern Greenland and parts of north-central Europe. The Caledonian orogeny encompasses events that occurred from the Ordovician to Early Devonian, roughly 490–390 million years ago (Ma). It was caused by the closure of the Iapetus Ocean when the Laurentia and Baltica continents and the Avalonia microcontinent collided.

The orogeny is named for Caledonia, the Latin name for Scotland. The term was first used in 1885 by Austrian geologist Eduard Suess for an episode of mountain building in northern Europe that predated the Devonian period. Geologists like Émile Haug and Hans Stille saw the Caledonian event as one of several episodic phases of mountain building that had occurred during Earth's history. Current understanding has it that the Caledonian orogeny encompasses a number of tectonic phases that can laterally be diachronous, meaning that different parts of the mountain range formed at different times. The name "Caledonian" can therefore not be used for an absolute period of geological time, it applies only to a series of tectonically related events.

== Palaeogeographic evolution prior to the orogeny ==
In the Neoproterozoic most of the Earth's landmasses were united in the Rodinia supercontinent. The majority of its bulk consisted of the landmass of Gondwana. (Note: Gondwana comprised Africa, South America, Australia, Antarctica, parts of what later was to be Europe and much of what later was to be Asia.) Near the end of the Neoproterozoic, during the breakup of this supercontinent, Laurentia (Note: Laurentia comprised most of present day Canada and the United States (except for their western part, including Alaska), a north-eastern portion of Mexico, Greenland, Svalbard, Scotland, and the northern and western parts of Ireland.) and Baltica (Note: Baltica comprised the eastern part of the future Europe: European Russia, the Baltic states, Belarus, Ukraine, Moldova, part of Poland, Denmark and the Scandinavian Peninsula. Its margin cut through Poland diagonally west of Zamość and Warsaw and Koszalin in Pomerania. See Mikołajczak et al. (2019)) rifted from the western (Amazonian craton) and northern (African) margins of Gondwana respectively.

Laurentia first drifted westward away from Gondwana and then migrated northward. This led to the opening of the Iapetus Ocean between Laurentia, Baltica and Gondwana. Its initial opening phase was between the adjacent Laurentia and Baltica (to the West and East respectively) and caused the two to breakup c. 615 Ma or 590 Ma. Then the part between Laurentia and Gondwana (to the east), opened c. 550 Ma. (Note: This dating has been debated and three different date ranges have been proposed, 750–700 Ma, 600–570 Ma and 550–530 Ma. See Robert et al. (2021)) Further spreading of the Iapetus Ocean also caused Laurentia and Baltica to move away from each other.

Baltica drifted northward, too. This involved the opening of the Tornquist Ocean which separated it from the northern margin of Gondwana to the south. The onset of Baltica rifting and the Tornquist Ocean opening are difficult to date due to insufficient palaeomagnetic data but must have occurred in similar times as those of Laurentia and the Iapetus Ocean.

Either in the Late Precambrian or Early Ordovician, (Note: The timing of Avalonia's break from Gondwana is disputed. Fortey and Cocks (1992) proposed that Avalonia rifted in the Early Ordovician, whereas Landing (1996) argued for a Late Precambrian separation.) the Avalonia microcontinent (Note: Avalonia consisted of "north-western and possibly southern Poland, some accreted terranes in the basement of East Carpathians and their foredeep, terranes in northern Germany, the Ardennes of Belgium and northern France, England, Wales, south-eastern Ireland, the Avalon Peninsula of eastern Newfoundland, much of Nova Scotia, southern New Brunswick, and some coastal parts of New England", Golonka et al. (2009)) started to drift northwestward from the northern margin of Gondwana (Amazonia and northwest Africa) close to the original position of Baltica which had been to its north. Its rifting involved the opening and spreading of the Rheic Ocean to its south, which separated it from Gondwana. This rifting and opening were coeval with and may be related to subduction onset in the Iapetus Ocean. The drift of Avalonia was towards the positions where Baltica and Laurentia had been in the Ordovician; these continents were by then further north. It also involved the consumption of both the Iapetus Ocean and the Tornquist Ocean along its northern margin.

Avalonia's motion was related to slab pull created by the subduction of the Iapetus Ocean beneath the margin of Laurentia to its northwest and possibly also by ridge push created by the spreading of the Rheic Ocean. It migrated across the Iapetus Ocean orthogonally (at a right angle). Its drift included an up to 55° counterclockwise rotation with respect to the subduction zone to its north, mainly in the 470–450 Ma timeframe. It moved significantly faster than Baltica but slowed down to a rate comparable to that of the latter in the Late Ordovician when it got close to it.

The main phases of the Caledonian orogeny resulted from the convergence of Baltica, Laurentia and Avalonia which led to the closure of the Iapetus Ocean.

== Early orogenic phases ==
McKerrow et al. (2000) give a definition of the Caledonian orogeny which includes "all the Cambrian, Ordovician, Silurian and Devonian tectonic events associated with the development and closure of those parts of the Iapetus Ocean which were situated between Laurentia (to the NW) and Baltica and Avalonia (to the SE and east) ... and each tectonic event throughout this 200 million years can be considered as an orogenic phase." This includes tectonic events which were smaller, localised and predated the more well-known main phases of this orogeny.

In this definition, the Taconic and Acadian orogenies in what today is North America are included in the phases of the Caledonian orogeny.

Some early phases of deformation and metamorphism are recognised in the Scandinavian Caledonides. The first phase that is often included in the Caledonian orogeny is the Finnmarkian Orogeny, which was an early deformation event in Arctic (northern) Norway which preceded the Scandian phase (see below) in this area. Its onset has been dated at c. 500 Ma (Late Cambrian). It continued to c. 460 Ma and was reactivated in the Scandian phase at ~425–415 Ma.

According to van Roermund and Brueckner (2004), there was a distinct orogenic event which was separate and slightly younger than that of the Finnmarkian one, which they dated at 455 Ma. They named it the Jämtlandian Orogeny. It involved the Seve Nappe Complex of the Swedish Caledonides in central Sweden, which is interpreted as the stretched outermost edge of Baltica. Contrary to the previous opinion that it had been subducted beneath an oceanic island arc, they propose that it involved a collision with a continental fragment.

The Shelveian Orogeny occurred particularly in the Shelve area in Shropshire, in eastern Wales and in the English Midlands in the Late Ordovician and was related to the Taconic orogeny. It formed the Shelve Anticline and Rytton Castle Syncline and was the most important tectonic event in the area between the Cambrian and Devonian. Folding was accompanied by late stage igneous intrusions. The event caused a major unconformity in Shropshire with considerable erosion before the deposition of sediments in the Llandovery Epoch of the Silurian (444–443 Ma). There was no break in sediments in the area until the end of the Early Devonian, which was caused by the Acadian Orogeny in the British Isles. It was associated with dextral (right-lateral) strike-slip movement in the Pontesford-Linley fault system and folding in pre-Ashgill strata, uplift of the adjacent Towi Anticline and igneous activity.

== Main orogenic phases ==
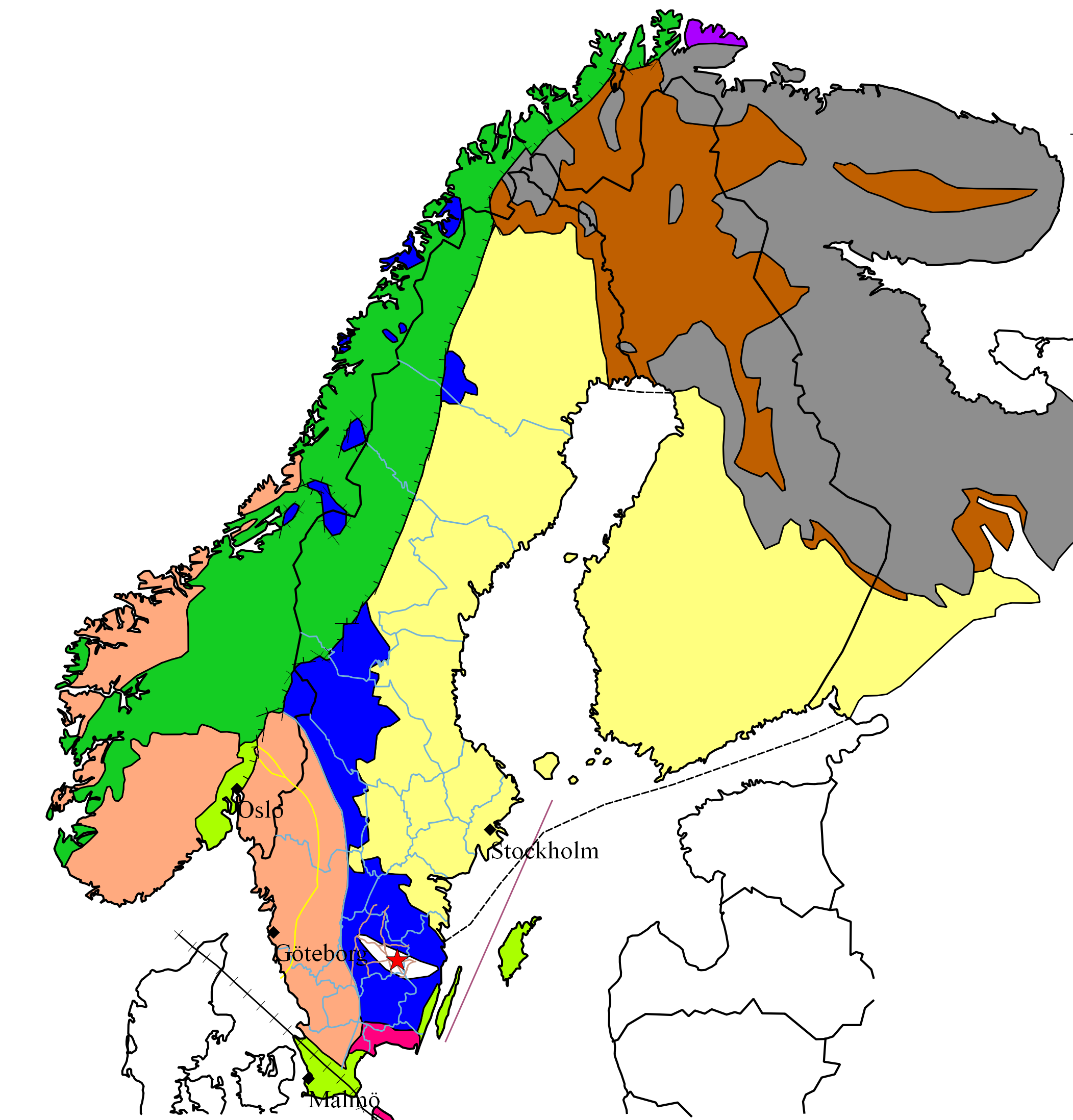
Geological map of Fennoscandia. The Sveconorwegian Orogen (including the Western Gneiss Region) is shown in pink. The nappes emplaced by the much younger Caledonian orogeny are shown in green.

The main orogenic events or phases of the Caledonian orogenic cycle were related to the final closure of the Iapetus Ocean. They were, in sequential order, the Grampian phase, the docking of Eastern Avalonia with Baltica, the Scandian phase and the Acadian phase. The latter involved: A) the docking of England and Wales (which were part of eastern Avalonia) with eastern and southern Ireland with Scotland and the rest of Ireland (which were part of Laurentia). B) the amalgamation of terranes of Western Avalonia with the eastern margin of the main landmass of Laurentia (see Acadian orogeny article for this orogeny).

During the final part of its northwestward migration, Avalonia converged with Baltica and Laurentia to its northeast and northwest respectively. After its amalgamation with Eastern Avalonia, Baltica converged with Laurentia in a westward direction. The combined convergence of this microcontinent and the two continents created continental collisions between them, the mentioned orogenic events and the closure of the Iapetus and Tornquist oceans.

Continental collisions started in the Mid Silurian and mountain building and ended in the Early Devonian (420–405 Ma).

=== Grampian orogeny ===
The Grampian orogeny involved collisions between two landmasses of Laurentia and an oceanic island arc in the Iapetus Ocean outboard the main margin of the Laurentia tectonic plate (the future North America). There two Laurentian landmasses were Scotland and northern and western Ireland. The other parts of the British Isles (England and Wales and the rest of Ireland) were part of the Avalonia microcontinent.

==== Eastern and Western Avalonia ====
Two parts of Avalonia have been distinguished, a western and an eastern one. The term Western Avalonia refers to the westernmost part of the microcontinent which amalgamated the east coast of the main part of the Laurentia tectonic plate (what is now North America) to the west in the area of the northern Appalachians and the Maritimes. Eastern Avalonia refers to a) the part which amalgamated with Baltica, b) England a Wales and eastern and south-eastern Ireland which amalgamated with Scotland and the north and west of Ireland (which were part of Laurentia).

=== Docking Eastern Avalonia with Baltica ===
The easternmost part of Eastern Avalonia amalgamated with Baltica through an oblique soft docking governed by dextral strike-slip convergence and shear, rather than through an orogen-causing hard continental collision. This is indicated by the absence of orogenic structures or high-pressure metamorphic rocks, which are either not present or buried. This event occurred close to the end of the Ordovician, 440 Ma. It docked with the Baltica margins in southern Denmark, the south-western corner of the Baltic Sea and Poland. It came to comprise Silesia in Poland, northern Germany, the Netherlands, Belgium and part of north-eastern France (the Ardennes Mountains).

The Anglo-Brabant massif or London-Brabant Massif in central and southern England and in Belgium is a large basement massif. (Note: In England the Anglo-Brabant massif covers Leicestershire, Rutland and Northamptonshire in the East Midlands region, the East of England region, the Thames Valley sub-region, London and Kent. It crosses the English Channel along the eastern coast of East Anglia and the coast of Kent. On the other side of the English Channel, it covers the northern part of the Hauts-de-France region and the Ardennes department of France. In Belgium to covers the north-western part of Hainaut Province, the East Flanders and West Flanders provinces and much of the Brabant province. In the Netherlands it is found in the Zeelandic Flanders and the Zuid-Beveland–Walcheren–Noord-Beveland former islands in Zeeland.) It is part of a magmatic belt which, starting from the Lake District, to the north of this massif, bears record of the subduction of part of the Tornquist Sea beneath Avalonia and its closure. The closure of the Rheic Ocean, which took place soon after, occurred through subduction along the southern margin of this massif.

==== Trans-European Suture Zone ====
The Trans-European Suture Zone or Tornquist Zone is the area of the suture of Baltica and Eastern Avalonia. It runs from a portion of the North Sea close to Denmark, through southern Denmark, a portion of the Baltic Sea between Denmark and Poland (by Germany's Rügen Island), and through Poland. It then follows the eastern margin of the Eastern Carpathian Mountains in western Ukraine. Finally, it runs to the Black Sea. However, in the Sudetes Mountains and the Eastern Carpathians, it evolved through the Variscan and the Alpine orogenies, rather than the Caledonian one.

=== Scandian Phase ===
The Scandian phase involved a collision between eastern Greenland on the eastern margin of Laurentia and the margin of the Baltoscandian platform of the Fennoscandian peninsula of Baltica. It involved the Scandinavian Caledonides in what is now Norway and the Swedish areas by its border. It occurred from the Wenlock Epoch of the Silurian to the Mid Devonian (430–380 Ma). Gee et al. (2013) and Ladenberger et al. (2012) propose a revised onset dating set at 440 Ma, however, there is no consensus about this.

The Scandian orogenic event also led to the formation of mountains of Queen Louise Land (or Dronning Louise Land) in north-eastern Greenland. It is an exposed N–S trending thrust zone which marks the western limit of intense Caledonian deformation. The dominant structures are interpreted as having resulted from sinistral transpression, which involved strain partitioning of regional deformation between sinistral strike-slip movements in the east and NW-directed oblique thrusting and folding further to the west.

This orogenic event also affected Scotland and the outer Hebrides, causing thrusting in the Northern Highlands which culminated in the development of the Moine Thrust Belt, Ben Hope Thrust and Naver-Sgùrr Beag Thrust (435–420 Ma) and led to igneous intrusion in Galloway and the Southern Uplands (c. 400 Ma) in Scotland and the enlargement of the Lake District batholith in northern England. All this spanned the Iapetus Suture zone (see below). It also caused northeast trending strike-slip faults, such as the Great Glen Fault which affected the Moine Supergroup and the Dalradian rocks in Scotland and the Shetland Islands through the Walls Boundary Fault, which is the northeast-ward extension of the Great Glen Fault.

=== Acadian Late Caledonian or proto-Variscan orogeny in the British Isles ===
As mentioned above, the British Isles were separated and belonged to two different tectonic plates: Laurentia (Scotland and northern and western Ireland) and Avalonia (England and Wales and the rest of Ireland). The Early Devonian Acadian event in this area saw the amalgamation of these landmasses to form the British Isles as they are now. This occurred through NW-dipping subduction of Avalonian oceanic crust beneath the southern margins of the Laurentian landmasses.

Since the 1980s the term Acadian, which referred to the Late Silurian to Early Devonian orogeny in the Northern Appalachians, and the Maritime Provinces of Canada has been applied to the early Devonian deformation phase in the British Caledonides by analogy with the one that occurred in what is now North America. Late Caledonian orogeny is another term used in reference to this phase.

This phase involved a soft docking or soft collision rather an orogen-causing hard continental collision like the Eastern Avalonia docking with Baltica.

This orogenic event has been interpreted as a late Caledonian phase and as having been driven by the closure of the Iapetus Ocean. However, there is also an argument that it would more appropriate to regard it as a proto-Variscan orogeny. This is because this Devonian event postdated the collision of Avalonia with Laurentia by 15–20 million years and was coeval with the early phase of the Variscan orogeny (Eo-Variscan or Ligerian) and because it was not related to the Iapetus Ocean.

It also has been argued that, although the Acadian orogeny in the British Isles involved the Iapetus Ocean closure, its driving force was actually a push from the south caused by the northward subduction of the Rheic Ocean which lay to the south of Avalonia and separated it from Gondwana. The closure of this ocean involved the (early) Eo-Variscan collision of Gondwana-related terranes in which Eastern Avalonia was peripherally involved.

Subduction of the Iapetus Ocean occurred beneath the Midland Valley terrane of Scotland. There is a Trans-Suture Suite of intrusive plutons which straddle both sides of the trace of the Iapetus Suture in the Southern Uplands terrane of Scotland (to the north of the suture) and the Lakesman-Leinster terrane of northern England and eastern Ireland (to the south of the suture) which were at the Laurentia and Avalonia margins respectively. The emplacement of the plutons occurred after the subduction of the Iapetus Ocean ended.

The Southern Uplands terrane is thought to be an accretionary wedge. Deep marine sedimentation here in response to subduction begun 455 Ma and marked the switch from an initial SE-dipping Iapetus subduction under Avalonia to a NW-dipping one beneath Laurentia. About 430 Ma accretion in the Southern Uplands and Ireland switched from being orthogonal (at a right angle) to a sinistrally (left-lateral) transpressive one as indicated by cleavage transecting folds counterclockwise. Turbidite deposition in the oceanic trench overlapped onto the Lakesman-Leinster terrane. Laurentia-Avalonia convergence and Iapetus Ocean subduction ceased by C. 420 Ma as indicated by a mid-Silurian weakening of deformation in the accretionary wedge.

Magma production should be larger in convergent tectonic regimes during subduction and markedly reduced with the change to post-subduction collisional regimes. However, during Iapetus subduction (455–425 Ma) this was low and intrusive rocks were largely absent across all terranes in the concerned area in this period. Most Acadian magmatism occurred post-subduction (425-390 Ma) in a regional tectonic setting with alternating transpression and transtension phases. High rates of magma generation coincided with a c. 418–404 Ma Early Devonian sinistral transtension phase. This decreased during the 404–394 Ma Acadian transpression.

In addition, the Southern Uplands accretionary wedge lacks evidence of the presence of a volcanic arc as usually found near subduction zones. This has led to the hypotheses that arc rocks were eroded and thus have not been preserved, that the arc was displaced by lateral movement along strike-slip faults or that this is due to flat–slab subduction, which reduces magmatism rates.

Nelison et al. (2009) propose an Iapetus Ocean subducting slab breakoff model to account for the intrusive rocks in the Grampian terrane being emplaced post-subduction. However, Miles at al. (2016) note that the intrusive rocks in the Trans-Suture Suite and in all the terranes in the region are similar in age and geochemistry. Thus, they argue that the common mechanism for the whole region involved an Iapetus Ocean slab which did not just break off. It also peeled back below the Iapetus Suture for c. 100 km to the SE below Avalonia. Thus they invoke a model of slab drop-off caused by lithospheric mantle delamination.

==== Northern England, Lake District ====
The Lakesman terrane covers the north of England down to the Wensleydale in North Yorkshire and crosses the Irish Sea passing by the Island of Anglesey off Wales. Its continuation in eastern Ireland is the Leinster terrane. The combined terrane is termed Leinster-Lakesman terrane. It lies on the southern margin of the Iapetus Suture. It includes the Lake District and the Isle of Man.

The Acadian Orogeny affected the Lakesman terrane and north Wales. Transpression resulted in regionally clockwise transecting sinistral transpressive cleavages which were superimposed on pre-existing structures. Folding northwest of the Iapetus Suture is weak and this northward weakening of deformation may indicate that it is linked with Rheic Ocean subduction rather than Iapetus Ocean closure.

The Lake District in north-western England was at the north-western margin of the English part of Eastern Avalonia which converged and collided with Scotland and was thus involved in the Acadian phase. Generally, Acadian deformation metamorphosed mudrocks throughout various geologic formations of the district into slates by creating slaty cleavages.

- In the Early to Middle Ordovician the Skiddaw Group was a deep submarine sedimentary basin whose sediments were largely derived from an earlier continental margin volcanic arc. It underwent subduction-related tectonic uplift which brought it above water. Convergence eventually caused the ranges of the Southern Uplands of Scotland to extend across the sutured Iapetus Ocean. This caused thrust imbrication of the group and a penetrative slaty cleavage with a broadly Caledonian trend superimposed on the earlier fabric of the group. The final stage of compression may have also involved the reactivation of thrust faults.
- In the Middle to Late Ordovician the Borrowdale Volcanic Group (BVG) and Eycott Volcanic Group (EVG) underwent caldera collapse as indicated by block-faulted tracts. The superimposed Acadian deformations are regional monoclines north of the EVG and south of the BVG, which are part the Lake District anticline whose core is the Skiddaw Group (which is overlain by the EVG). The BVD is dominated by synclines and anticlines are generally absent. This suggests that the Acadian deformation tightened the main basins of the BGV and folded its strata and that the major synclines were reactivated and tightened volcanic basins. A cleavage with fabrics varying from spaced to slaty and penetrative was superimposed locally.
- The Windermere Supergroup was a foreland basin on the Avalonia margin which was created by the subduction of Avalonia continental crust beneath Laurentia. It underwent accelerating subsidence through the Middle to Late Silurian. It was related to indentation of a rigid basement block that was driven northward during Acadian continental collision creating transpressive strain. The Acadian orogeny created a single penetrative cleavage throughout the Supergroup. It underwent a small clockwise transection of the folds in the west of the outcrop and small anticlockwise one in the east which is part of a wider transecting cleavage pattern across the Avalonian rocks of Britain and Ireland.
- The Westmorland Monocline, which lies above the southern margin of the Lake District batholith (which underlies most of the central part of the district) is a more extensive Acadian deformation which affects the BVG outcrop southern margin overlying Windermere Supergroup strata. Cleavage is strongly developed in the volcanic rocks close to its hinge zone. The Honister slate belt in the north of this area is another enhanced cleavage zone. Deformation is more marked at the edges of the batholith as the granite it is made of is resistant to tectonic stress.

==== Isle of Man ====
The Early Palaeozoic rocks in the Isle of Man in the Irish Sea crop out close to or probably on Iapetus suture. The island lies immediately to its SE.

The island is composed mainly of the Manx Group and the Dalby Group which were deformed in a sinistral transpression zone during the sinistral, oblique closure of the Iapetus Ocean. Folds are transected clockwise by their cleavage, major strike-parallel sinistral faults and ductile shear zones thought to be related to this transpression. All primary folds have the same style and are associated with the same regional cleavage suggesting that they are roughly coeval. There is ductile deformation in some localities and a broad shear zone in the Langness Peninsula which deform the primary cleavage and are thought to have formed during or soon after the main deformation phase.

The Dalby Group was overthrust onto the Manx Group, probably in the early Devonian. During the final stage of the Iapetus Ocean closure its turbidites were deposited from the NE into a marine basin which bridged the Avalonia and Laurentia margins. The tectonic contact between the two groups has been correlated either with the Windermere Supergroup (Lake District) turbidites or the Riccarton Group, (Southern Uplands terrane).The former hypothesis implies that the Dalby Group was originally deposited on the Manx Group and was subsequently faulted into its present day relationship. The latter one implies that it is the toe end of the Southern Uplands turbidite accretionary wedge onlapping or thrust onto the Avalonia continental margin.

The broad deformation style and age of the Manx Group are very similar to the equivalent features of the Skiddaw Group in the Lake District and the Ribband Group in SE Ireland. This group is thought to be their regional equivalent. It underwent two main deformation phases which also affected the Dalby Group: a) a pervasive slaty cleavage associated with gently to moderately plunging folds which also affected many of the minor igneous intrusions, b) a gently dipping crenulation cleavage associated with small folds verging towards the bedding dip direction.

There are several ductile shear zones which run subparallel to the Manx Group northeast-oriented boundary faults which indicate predominantly sinistral shear and possibly a transition from orthogonal compression to transpression during the later stages of Acadian deformation. This makes the island more similar to the Southern Uplands terrane of Scotland than the Lake District inlier in this respect.

==== Ireland ====
In Ireland the Acadian Orogeny affected the four main terranes of the island: Grampian, Midland Valley, Longford-Down and Leinster. Tectonic deformation was mild as the collision was strongly oblique with sinistral transpression and without substantial crustal thickening. Devonian to Carboniferous rocks rest unconformably on Cambrian to Silurian folded and cleaved rocks. There were igneous intrusions with plutons and batholiths.

- The Irish Grampian terrane is the continuation of Grampian terrane in Scotland. It is composed of the Dalradian Supergroup and its gneiss basement which was affected by the Grampian orogeny. These rocks responded to Acadian deformation relatively rigidly and their main deformation was a NE–SW trending ductile sinistral shear zone in the Dalradian. The Donegal batholith (c. 428–400 Ma) was emplaced into this shear zone. The Leannan Fault is a major splay of the Great Glen Fault of Scotland. Its movement occurred in the Devonian. The Fair Head–Clew Bay Line is a lineament and fault zone from Antrim to Mayo. Here there was sinistral Acadian brittle deformation and strike-slip motion in the Central Ox Mountains. This may continue as a sinistral transpressive shear zone into the Clew Bay southern margin. The Ox Mountains granodiorite was emplaced c. 412 Ma.
- The Midland Valley terrane is continuation of the terrane of the same name in Scotland. It underwent more ductile regional strain than the Grampian terrane, with upright folds, cleavage and polyphase deformation. Acadian deformation resulted in steeply-dipping to vertical Silurian rocks and a NE trending syncline in the Curlew Mountains inlier, folds and a SE dipping thrust fault in the Pomeroy inlier (County Tyrone) and NE trending open buckle folds in the Early Old Red Sandstone rocks by Cushendall, in County Antrim.
- The Longford-Down terrane is the SE continuation of the Southern Uplands terrane in Scotland and the Southern Uplands Fault all the way to Galway Bay in County Galway, western Ireland. It lies to the SE of the Grampian and Midland Valley terranes. In underwent most of its deformation during the subduction and closure of the Iapetus Ocean prior to the Acadian orogeny. It has Early Palaeozoic deep marine rocks deposited on the NW margin of the Iapetus Ocean. The Southern-Upland-Longford-Down terrane has been interpreted as having been either an accretionary wedge or a back-arc basin.

The terrane has three relief belts. The northern belt and the northernmost part of the Central Belt underwent pure shear deformation with an axial planar cleavage and a stretching lineation perpendicular to the fold hinges. The Southern Belt and the rest of the Central belt underwent sinistral transpression. This reflects a Late Ordovician–Silurian change from an orthogonal to an oblique tectonic plate collision. In the Central Belt the cleavage transects folds in a clockwise sense and is accompanied by a sub-horizontal stretching lineation. In the Southern belt the Tinure Fault is the surface expression of the Iapetus Suture zone.

- The Leinster terrane is the continuation of the Lakesman terrane in the Lake District of England and the Isle of Man. Unlike the other main terranes in Ireland, it was part of Eastern Avalonia. It covers the east and southwest of Ireland. It is dominated by upright folds with associated cleavage and thrust faulting. Later large scale NE–SW trending Acadian shear zones In the Leinster inlier are associated with the coeval emplacement of the early Devonian Leinster granite, which is the largest batholith in the British Isles. Its Northern unit was intruded incrementally by three crosscutting types of granite and was formed over 16.8 million years. The oldest granite is dated at c. 417 Ma. Following deformation there was another intrusion c. 410 Ma (equigranular granite) and this in turn was cut by megacrystic granite at c. 404.9 Ma.
- In the Dingle Peninsula (County Kerry) in south-western Ireland, the Dingle Group underwent Acadian deformation with a high-strain penetrative cleavage prior to the deposition of the Upper Devonian Slieve Mish Group in the same peninsula. The Early Devonian Dingle Basin was the source of detritus deposition in the Late Devonian Munster Basin to the south (which covered the Kerry and Cork counties). The Dingle basin underwent sediment recycling into the Munster Basin following Mid-Devonian Acadian basin inversion.

=== Iapetus Suture ===
The Iapetus Suture is the lineament where the Caledonian collision closed the Iapetus Ocean. In Ireland, it runs from the estuary of the River Shannon on the Atlantic coast to Clogherhead on the Irish Sea. It crosses this sea and is exposed in the Niarbyl Fault in the southern part of the northern coast of the Isle of Man. In Britain, it runs roughly parallel to the Anglo-Scottish border. It consists of a series of faults with no traces of subduction, such as ophiolite remnants or oceanic trench-derived rocks.

The Iapetus Suture also extends along the margin of the Baltoscandian platform of the Fennoscandian Peninsula which collided with the eastern margin of Greenland along the eastern margin of Laurentia in the Scandian orogeny.

== Controversies ==
According to some authors, the Caledonian continental collisions involved another microcontinent, Armorica (southern Portugal, most of the north of France and parts of southern Germany and the Czech Republic), even smaller than Avalonia. This microcontinent probably did not form one consistent unit, but was instead a series of fragments, of which the current Armorican and Bohemian Massifs are the most important. The ocean between the combined continental mass of Laurentia, Baltica and Avalonia (called Euramerica, Laurussia or Old Red Continent) and Armorica is called the Rheic Ocean.

The paleogeographic position of the Armorica crustal fragments between the Ordovician and Carboniferous is highly disputed though. There are indications that the Bohemian Massif started moving northward from the Ordovician onward, but many authors place the accretion of the Armorican terranes with the southern margin of Laurussia in the Carboniferous Variscan orogeny (about 340 million years ago). The Rhenohercynian basin, a back-arc basin, formed at the southern margin of Euramerica just after the Caledonian orogeny. According to these authors, a small rim from Euramerica rifted off when this basin formed. The basin closed when these Caledonian deformed terranes were accreted again to Laurussia during the Hercynian orogeny.

== See also ==
- Scandinavian Mountains
- Świętokrzyskie Mountains
- Geological structure of Great Britain
- Central Pangean Mountains

== Bibliography ==
- Averill, M.; Bond, T.; Sroda, P.; Keller, G.; Miller, K. (2003). "An integrated lithospheric study targeting the Holy Cross Mountains of the Eastern European Trans-European Suture Zone in Poland". EGS - AGU - EUG Joint Assembly: 7149. Bibcode:2003EAEJA.....7149A.
- "Caledonian Orogeny and associated magmatism". British Geological Survey, Bedrock Geology UK North.
- Brown, P. E.; Ryan, P. D.; Soper, N. J.; Woodcock, N. H. (2008-02-01). "The Newer Granite problem revisited: a transtensional origin for the Early Devonian Trans-Suture Suite" (PDF). Geological Magazine. 145 (2). Cambridge University Press (CUP): 235. Bibcode:2008GeoM..145..235B. doi:10.1017/s0016756807004219. ISSN 0016-7568.
- Chew, D. M. (2022-07-18). "Grampian Orogeny". The Geology of Ireland. Liverpool University Press. pp. 69–94. doi:10.2307/jj.12638997.7. ISBN 978-1-903544-49-5.
- Chew, D. M.; Stillman, C. J. (2022-07-18). "Late Caledonian orogeny and magmatism". The Geology of Ireland. Liverpool University Press. pp. 143–174. doi:10.2307/jj.12638997.11. ISBN 978-1-903544-49-5.
- Clegg, Phillip (2002). Strain partitioning in transpression zones: examples from the lapetus suture zone in Britain and Ireland (PhD thesis). Durham University.
- Cocks, L. R. M.; Torsvik, T. H. (2006). "European geography in a global context from the Vendian to the end of the Palaeozoic" (PDF). Geological Society, London, Memoirs. 32 (1): 83–95. doi:10.1144/GSL.MEM.2006.032.01.05. ISSN 0435-4052.
- Cocks, L. R. M.; McKerrow, W. S.; Van Staal, C. R. (1997). "The margins of Avalonia" (PDF). Geological Magazine. 134 (5). Cambridge University Press (CUP): 627–636. Bibcode:1997GeoM..134..627C. doi:10.1017/s0016756897007425. ISSN 0016-7568.
- Corfu, F.; Gasser, D.; Chew, D. M. (2014). "New perspectives on the Caledonides of Scandinavia and related areas: introduction". Geological Society, London, Special Publications. 390 (1): 1–8. Bibcode:2014GSLSP.390....1C. doi:10.1144/SP390.28. ISSN 0305-8719.
- Ennis, Meg; Meere, Patrick A.; Timmerman, Martin J.; Sudo, Masafumi (2015). "Post-Acadian sediment recycling in the Devonian Old Red Sandstone of Southern Ireland". Gondwana Research. 28 (4). Elsevier BV: 1415–1433. Bibcode:2015GondR..28.1415E. doi:10.1016/j.gr.2014.10.007. ISSN 1342-937X.
- Fortey, R.A.; Cocks, L.R.M. (1992). "The early palaeozoic of the North Atlantic region as a test case for the use of fossils in continental reconstruction". Tectonophysics. 206 (1–2). Elsevier BV: 147–158. Bibcode:1992Tectp.206..147F. doi:10.1016/0040-1951(92)90373-e. ISSN 0040-1951.
- Fossen, Haakon; Dunlap, W.James (1998). "Timing and kinematics of Caledonian thrusting and extensional collapse, southern Norway: evidence from 40Ar/39Ar thermochronology". Journal of Structural Geology. 20 (6). Elsevier BV: 765–781. doi:10.1016/s0191-8141(98)00007-8. ISSN 0191-8141.
- Fritschle, Tobias; Daly, J. Stephen; Whitehouse, Martin J.; McConnell, Brian; Buhre, Stephan (2017-10-12). "Multiple intrusive phases in the Leinster Batholith, Ireland: geochronology, isotope geochemistry and constraints on the deformation history". Journal of the Geological Society. 175 (2). Geological Society of London: 229–246. doi:10.1144/jgs2017-034. ISSN 0016-7649.
- Gee, David G.; Janák, Marian; Majka, Jarosław; Robinson, Peter; van Roermund, Herman (2013). "Subduction along and within the Baltoscandian margin during closing of the Iapetus Ocean and Baltica-Laurentia collision". Lithosphere. 5 (2). GeoScienceWorld: 169–178. Bibcode:2013Lsphe...5..169G. doi:10.1130/l220.1. ISSN 1947-4253.
- Golonka, Jan; Krobicki, Michał; Poprawa, Paweł; Paul, Zbigniew; Khudoley, Andriej (2009-01-01). "EARLY PALEOZOIC EVOLUTION OF THE PERI-GONDWANA PLATES". Geologia/Akademia Górniczo-Hutnicza im. Stanisława Staszica w Krakowie. 33 (2/1): 339–344.
- Jones, Kevin; Blake, Stephen (2003). Mountain Building in Scotland. The Open University. ISBN 0-7492-5847-0.
- Keppie, J.; Keppie, D. (2014). "Ediacaran–Middle Paleozoic Oceanic Voyage of Avalonia from Baltica via Gondwana to Laurentia: Paleomagnetic, Faunal and Geological Constraints – Geoscience Canada". Geoscience Canada. 41 (1). The Geological Association of Canada: 5–18. doi:10.12789/geocanj.2014.41.039. ISSN 0315-0941.
- Kirkland, C.L.; Daly, J.S.; Chew, D.M.; Page, L.M. (2008). "The Finnmarkian Orogeny revisited: An isotopic investigation in eastern Finnmark, Arctic Norway". Tectonophysics. 460 (1–4). Elsevier BV: 158–177. Bibcode:2008Tectp.460..158K. doi:10.1016/j.tecto.2008.08.001. ISSN 0040-1951.
- Kneller, B. C. (1991). "A foreland basin on the southern margin of Iapetus". Journal of the Geological Society. 148 (2): 207–210. Bibcode:1991JGSoc.148..207K. doi:10.1144/gsjgs.148.2.0207. ISSN 0016-7649.
- Ladenberger, A.; Gee, D. G.; Shlevin, eri; Claesson, S.; Majka, J.; eri Shlevin, Y. (2012). "The Scandian collision revisited". EGU General Assembly Conference Abstracts: 12633. Bibcode:2012EGUGA..1412633L.
- Landing, Ed (1996-11-01). "Reconstructing the Avalon continent: Marginal-to-inner platform transition in the Cambrian of Avalonian New Brunswick". Canadian Journal of Earth Sciences. 33 (6). Canadian Science Publishing: 1185–1192. doi:10.1139/e96-089. ISSN 0008-4077.
- Landing, Ed; Keppie, J. Duncan; Keppie, D. Fraser; Geyer, Gerd; Westrop, Stephen R. (2022). "Greater Avalonia—latest Ediacaran–Ordovician "peribaltic" terrane bounded by continental margin prisms ("Ganderia," Harlech Dome, Meguma): Review, tectonic implications, and paleogeography". Earth-Science Reviews. 224 103863. Elsevier BV. Bibcode:2022ESRv..22403863L. doi:10.1016/j.earscirev.2021.103863. ISSN 0012-8252.
- Matte, P. (2001). "The Variscan collage and orogeny (480–290 Ma) and the tectonic definition of the Armorica microplate: a review". Terra Nova. 13 (2): 122–128. Bibcode:2001TeNov..13..122M. doi:10.1046/j.1365-3121.2001.00327.x. ISSN 0954-4879.
- McKERROW, W. S.; Mac Niocaill, C.; Dewey, J. F. (2000). "The Caledonian Orogeny redefined". Journal of the Geological Society. 157 (6): 1149–1154. Bibcode:2000JGSoc.157.1149M. doi:10.1144/jgs.157.6.1149. ISSN 0016-7649.
- Mikołajczak, Mateusz; Mazur, Stanisław; Gągała, Łukasz (2019). "Depth-to-basement for the East European Craton and Teisseyre-Tornquist Zone in Poland based on potential field data". International Journal of Earth Sciences. 108 (2): 547–567. Bibcode:2019IJEaS.108..547M. doi:10.1007/s00531-018-1668-9. ISSN 1437-3254.
- Miles, A.J.; Woodcock, N.H.; Hawkesworth, C.J. (2016). "Tectonic controls on post-subduction granite genesis and emplacement: The late Caledonian suite of Britain and Ireland" (PDF). Gondwana Research. 39. Elsevier BV: 250–260. Bibcode:2016GondR..39..250M. doi:10.1016/j.gr.2016.02.006. ISSN 1342-937X.
- Miles, Andrew; Graham, Colin; Hawkesworth, Chris; Gillespie, Martin; Dhuime, Bruno; Hinton, Richard (2013-11-27). "Using Zircon Isotope Compositions to Constrain Crustal Structure and Pluton Evolution: the Iapetus Suture Zone Granites in Northern Britain". Journal of Petrology. 55 (1). Oxford University Press (OUP): 181–207. doi:10.1093/petrology/egt065. ISSN 1460-2415.
- MONA LISA Working Group (1997). "Closure of the Tornquist sea: Constraints from MONA LISA deep seismic reflection data". Geology. 25 (12): 1071–1074. Bibcode:1997Geo....25.1071M. doi:10.1130/0091-7613(1997)025<1071:COTTSC>2.3.CO;2.
- Neilson, J.C.; Kokelaar, B.P.; Crowley, Q.G. (2009). "Timing, relations and cause of plutonic and volcanic activity of the Siluro-Devonian post-collision magmatic episode in the Grampian Terrane, Scotland". Journal of the Geological Society. 166 (3): 545–561. Bibcode:2009JGSoc.166..545N. doi:10.1144/0016-76492008-069. hdl:2262/79144. ISSN 0016-7649.
- Pharaoh, Tim; England, Richard; Lee, Mick (1995). "The concealed Caledonide basement of Eastern England and the southern North Sea — A review" (PDF). Studia Geophysica et Geodaetica. 39 (3): 330–346. Bibcode:1995StGG...39..330P. doi:10.1007/BF02295826. ISSN 0039-3169.
- Pharaoh, Tim (2018). "The Anglo-Brabant Massif: Persistent but enigmatic palaeo-relief at the heart of western Europe" (PDF). Proceedings of the Geologists' Association. 129 (3). Elsevier BV: 278–328. Bibcode:2018PrGA..129..278P. doi:10.1016/j.pgeola.2018.02.009. ISSN 0016-7878.
- Phillips, W.E.A. (2001). "Caledonian deformation". In Holland, C.H. (ed.). The Geology of Ireland. Edinburgh: Dunedin Academic Press. pp. 179–200.
- Pollock, Jeffrey C.; Hibbard, James P.; Sylvester, Paul J. (2009). "Early Ordovician rifting of Avalonia and birth of the Rheic Ocean: U–Pb detrital zircon constraints from Newfoundland". Journal of the Geological Society. 166 (3). Geological Society of London: 501–515. Bibcode:2009JGSoc.166..501P. doi:10.1144/0016-76492008-088. ISSN 0016-7649.
- Rice, A.H.N.; Frank, W. (2003). "The early Caledonian (Finnmarkian) event reassessed in Finnmark: 40Ar/39Ar cleavage age data from NW Varangerhalvøya, N. Norway". Tectonophysics. 374 (3–4). Elsevier BV: 219–236. doi:10.1016/s0040-1951(03)00240-3. ISSN 0040-1951.
- Robert, Boris; Domeier, Mathew; Jakob, Johannes (2021). "On the origins of the Iapetus Ocean". Earth-Science Reviews. 221 103791. Elsevier BV. Bibcode:2021ESRv..22103791R. doi:10.1016/j.earscirev.2021.103791. ISSN 0012-8252.
- Schätz, M.; Reischmann, T.; Tait, J.; Bachtadse, V.; Bahlburg, H.; Martin, U. (2002-10-01). "The Early Palaeozoic break-up of northern Gondwana, new palaeomagnetic and geochronological data from the Saxothuringian Basin, Germany". International Journal of Earth Sciences. 91 (5): 838–849. Bibcode:2002IJEaS..91..838S. doi:10.1007/s00531-002-0261-3. ISSN 1437-3254.
- Schofield, David I.; Potter, Joanna; Barr, Sandra M.; Horák, Jana M.; Millar, Ian L.; Longstaffe, Frederick J. (2016). "Reappraising the Neoproterozoic 'East Avalonian' terranes of southern Great Britain". Gondwana Research. 35. Elsevier BV: 257–271. Bibcode:2016GondR..35..257S. doi:10.1016/j.gr.2015.06.001. ISSN 1342-937X.
- Stampfii, Gérard M.; von Raumer, Jürgen F.; Borel, Gilles D. (2002). "Paleozoic evolution of pre-Variscan terranes: From Gondwana to the Variscan collision" (PDF). Variscan-Appalachian dynamics: The building of the late Paleozoic basement (PDF). Geological Society of America. pp. 263–280. doi:10.1130/0-8137-2364-7.263. ISBN 978-0-8137-2364-8.
- Stone, P.; Cooper, A. H.; Evans, J. A. (1999). "The Skiddaw Group (English Lake District) reviewed: early Palaeozoic sedimentation and tectonism at the northern margin of Avalonia". Geological Society, London, Special Publications. 160 (1): 325–336. Bibcode:1999GSLSP.160..325S. doi:10.1144/GSL.SP.1999.160.01.21. ISSN 0305-8719.
- Stone, P; Millward, D; Young, B; Merritt, J W; Clarke, S M; McCormac, M; Lawrence, D J D. (2010). "Acadian Orogeny, Devonian, Northern England, British regional geology: Northern England, Fifth edition, Keyworth, Nottingham". British Geological Survey.
- Strachan, R.A; Friderichsen, J.D; Holdsworth, R.E; Jepsen, H.F (1994-01-01). "Regional geology and Caledonian structure, Dronning Louise Land, North-East Greenland". Rapport Grønlands Geologiske Undersøgelse. 162. Geological Survey of Denmark and Greenland: 71–76. doi:10.34194/rapggu.v162.8249. ISSN 2597-2944.
- Thigpen, J.R.; Law, R.D.; Loehn, C.L.; Strachan, R. A.; Tracy, R.J.; Lloyd, G.E.; Roth, B.L.; Brown, S.J. (2013). "Thermal structure and tectonic evolution of the Scandian orogenic wedge, Scottish Caledonides: integrating geothermometry, deformation temperatures and conceptual kinematic-thermal models". Journal of Metamorphic Geology. 31 (8): 813–842. Bibcode:2013JMetG..31..813T. doi:10.1111/jmg.12046. ISSN 0263-4929.
- TODD, S. P.; MURPHY, F. C.; KENNAN, P. S. (1991). "On the trace of the Iapetus suture in Ireland and Britain". Journal of the Geological Society. 148 (5). Geological Society of London: 869–880. Bibcode:1991JGSoc.148..869T. doi:10.1144/gsjgs.148.5.0869. ISSN 0016-7649.
- Toghill, P. (1990). "Ten years of geology in Shropshire" (PDF). Proceedings of the Shropshire Geological Society (9): 1–3.
- Torsvik, Trond H.; Cocks, L. Robin M. (2004). "Earth geography from 400 to 250 Ma: a palaeomagnetic, faunal and facies review". Journal of the Geological Society. 161 (4): 555–572. Bibcode:2004JGSoc.161..555T. doi:10.1144/0016-764903-098. ISSN 0016-7649.
- Torsvik, Trond H.; Rehnström, Emma F. (2003). "The Tornquist Sea and Baltica–Avalonia docking". Tectonophysics. 362 (1–4). Elsevier BV: 67–82. Bibcode:2003Tectp.362...67T. doi:10.1016/s0040-1951(02)00631-5. ISSN 0040-1951.
- TORSVIK, T; SMETHURST, M; MEERT, J; VANDERVOO, R; MCKERROW, W; BRASIER, M; STURT, B; WALDERHAUG, H (1996). "Continental break-up and collision in the Neoproterozoic and Palaeozoic — A tale of Baltica and Laurentia" (PDF). Earth-Science Reviews. 40 (3–4). Elsevier BV: 229–258. Bibcode:1996ESRv...40..229T. doi:10.1016/0012-8252(96)00008-6. ISSN 0012-8252.
- van Roermund, Herman; Brueckner, Hannes (2004-01-01). The Jämtlandian: A new orogeny in the Caledonides of central Sweden. International Geological Congress (IGC) At Florence, Italy.
- Waldron, John W.F.; Floyd, James D.; Simonetti, Antonio; Heaman, Larry M. (2008). "Ancient Laurentian detrital zircon in the closing Iapetus Ocean, Southern Uplands terrane, Scotland" (PDF). Geology. 36 (7): 527. Bibcode:2008Geo....36..527W. doi:10.1130/G24763A.1. ISSN 0091-7613.
- Wen, Bin; Evans, David A.D.; Anderson, Ross P.; McCausland, Phil J.A. (2020). "Late Ediacaran paleogeography of Avalonia and the Cambrian assembly of West Gondwana". Earth and Planetary Science Letters. 552 116591. Elsevier BV. Bibcode:2020E&PSL.55216591W. doi:10.1016/j.epsl.2020.116591. ISSN 0012-821X.
- Woodcock, N.H.; Soper, N.J.; Strachan, R.A. (2007). "A Rheic cause for the Acadian deformation in Europe". Journal of the Geological Society. 164 (5): 1023–1036. Bibcode:2007JGSoc.164.1023W. doi:10.1144/0016-76492006-129. ISSN 0016-7649.
- Ziegler, P.A. (1990). Geological Atlas of Western and Central Europe (2nd ed.). Shell Internationale Petroleum Maatschappij BV. ISBN 90-6644-125-9.
