= Iapetus Suture =

Ancient geological fault

Reconstruction showing the collision of three paleocontinents during Caledonian orogeny approximately 390 million years ago. The red line shows where the Iapetus Suture extends through present-day Ireland and Great Britain. A related suture through Denmark, Poland and Ukraine is the Trans-European Suture Zone.

The Iapetus Suture is one of several major geological faults caused by the collision of several ancient land masses forming a suture. It represents in part the remains of what was once the Iapetus Ocean. Iapetus was the father of Atlas in Greek mythology, making his an appropriate name for what used to be called the 'Proto-Atlantic Ocean'. When the Atlantic Ocean opened, in the Cretaceous period, it took a slightly different line from that of the Iapetus suture, with some originally Laurentian rocks being left behind in north-west Europe and other, Avalonian, rocks remaining as part of Newfoundland.

== Background ==
The Iapetus Ocean was an ancient ocean which existed in the Southern Hemisphere approximately 600 million years ago and was bordered by several paleocontinents: Laurentia, Ganderia, Carolinia, Avalonia, and Baltica. During a series of geological events, the Salinic orogeny and Caledonian orogeny, all three land masses began to converge upon each other, slowly diminishing the ocean by subducting the oceanic crust. By the end of the Silurian period, approximately 420 million years ago, the ocean had disappeared. The geological fault zone resulting from the continental collision is known as the Iapetus Suture, named after the ocean it replaced.

The closure of Iapetus involved a complex and protracted collisional history of numerous continental fragments, volcanic arcs and back-arc basins that were accreted to Laurentia and Avalonia between the Early Ordovician and Late Silurian. The notion of a single suture zone in a complex orogen such as the Appalachian/Caledonian is unrealistic as several temporal and spatial distinct suture zones are present.

== In Canada ==
The Early Ordovician (Taconic) Baie Verte Line in Quebec and Newfoundland marks the boundary between the continental margin of Laurentia and Iapetan oceanic rocks, while the Early Ordovician (Penobscot) GRUB Line defines the contact between the vestiges of Iapetus and Ganderia. The Middle Ordovician Red Indian Line is considered the main Iapetan suture zone in that it separates peri-Laurentian and peri-Gondwanan oceanic elements. The Dog Bay Line is a younger feature in the Appalachians and delineates the terminal Iapetan suture in Newfoundland as it marks the Early Silurian (Salinic) collisional zone between Ganderia and Laurentia.

== In the United States ==
The suture runs through the north-eastern states of Maine, New Hampshire, Massachusetts and Connecticut. Rhode Island lies entirely to the east of the suture.

== In Ireland ==
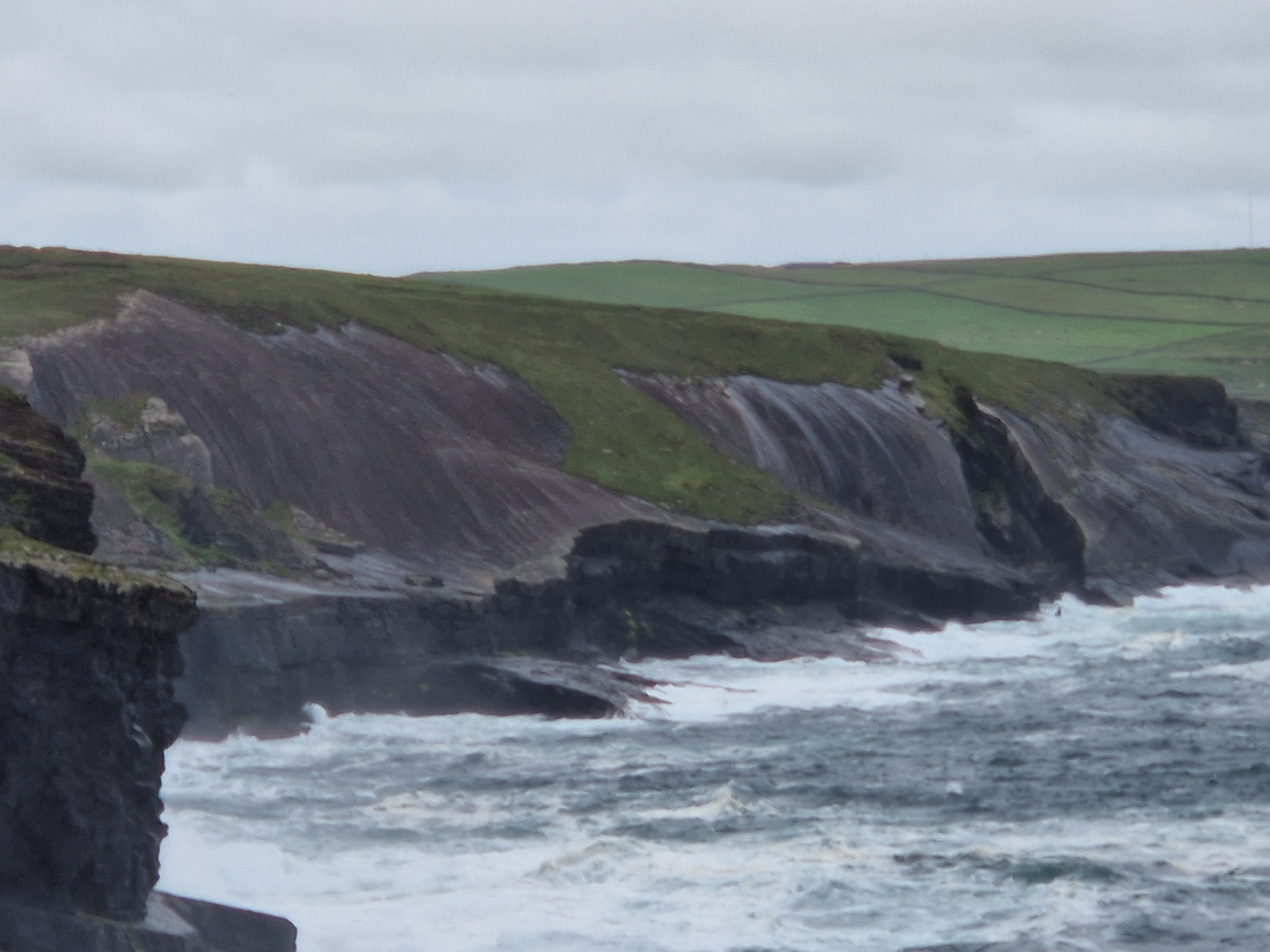
Photograph of the Kilkee Cliffs on the Loop Head Peninsula. These are folds from the closure of the Iapetus Ocean at the end of the Silurian period.

The estuary of the River Shannon (Ireland's largest river) follows the line of the Iapetus suture on the west coast. The suture reaches the east coast at Clogherhead in County Louth. Ireland's crust (and sedimentary rocks) to the north-west of the suture originally derives from Laurentia (proto-North America), while the crust to the south-east is Avalonian ("European").

== In the Isle of Man (Niarbyl Fault) ==
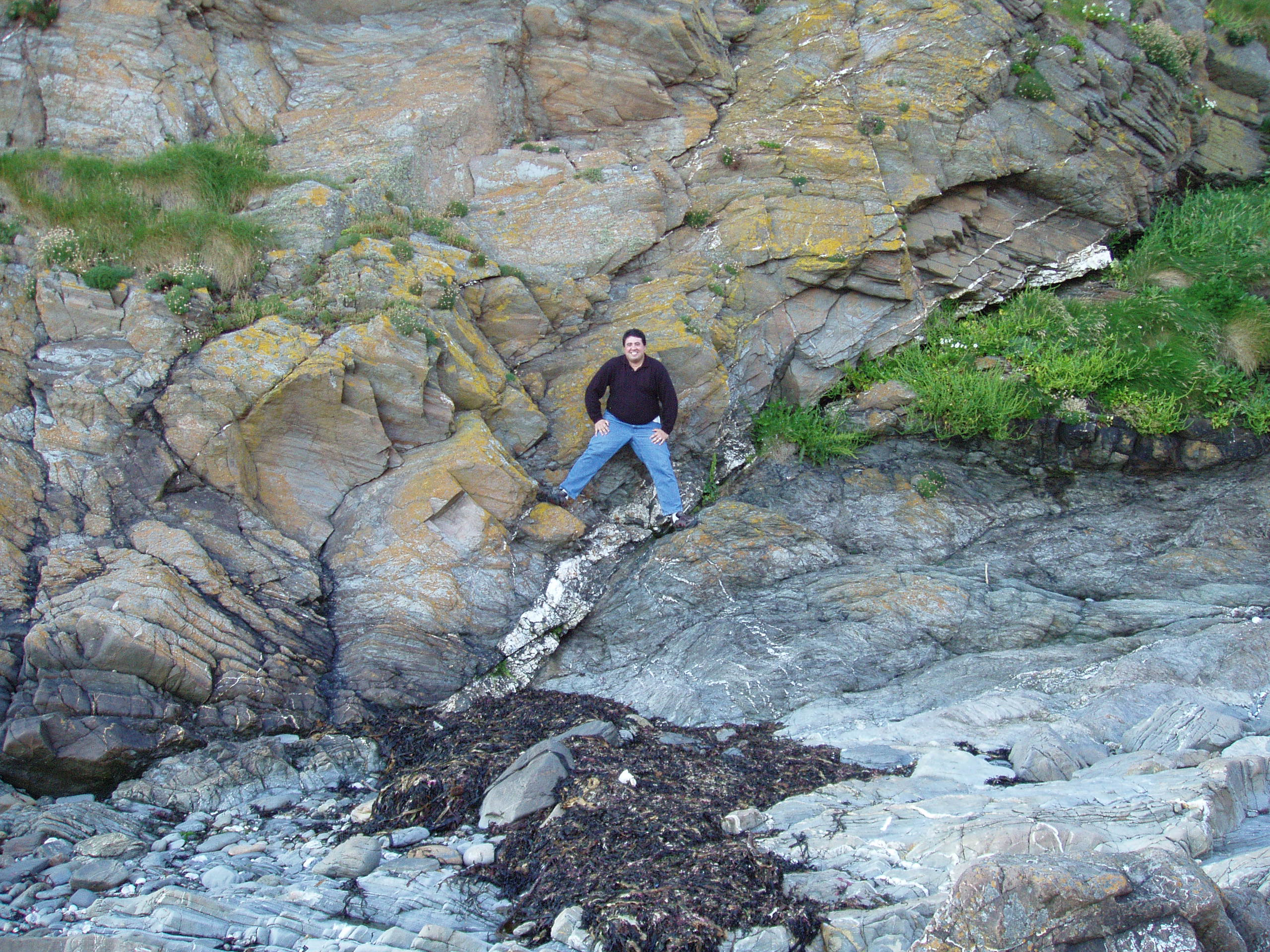
The Niarbyl Fault marks the Iapetus Suture on the Isle of Man. The rocks at top and left formed in Laurentia but the rocks at lower right formed in Gondwana

The Niarbyl Fault is an exposed section of the Iapetus Suture as it crosses through the Irish Sea. It is readily visible in present-day Niarbyl on the southwest coast of Isle of Man. The fault is manifested by two major rock groups which abut each other, both deposited by their respective, aforementioned continents – the Manx Group to the south-east and the Dalby Group to the north-west. The Niarbyl fault is evidence of two paleocontinents colliding: Avalonia on which present-day England is located and Laurentia which contains both present-day North America and Scotland.

The fault is visible close to the shoreline downhill from the Niarbyl Cafe and Visitor Centre in Niarbyl.

== In Great Britain ==
The Caledonian orogeny united the northern and southern portions of present-day Great Britain. The Iapetus Suture runs from the Solway Firth to Lindisfarne. The Anglo-Scottish border runs near and roughly parallel to the suture.

== See also ==
- Plate tectonics – Movement of Earth's lithosphere
- Supercontinent cycle – Repeated joining and separation of Earth's continents
- Trans-European Suture Zone – Boundary between the East European Craton and the orogens of South-Western Europe
