= Meguma terrane =

Terrane exposed in southern Nova Scotia

Coordinates: 44°30′00″N 65°00′00″W

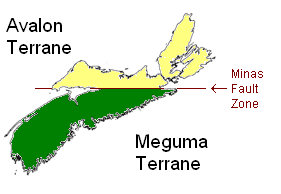
Map of Nova Scotia, showing how the Meguma terrane forms the southern portion.

The Meguma terrane, also known as Megumia, is a terrane exposed in southern Nova Scotia, that accreted onto the present North American landmass as part of the Appalachian orogeny.

The exposed part of the Meguma terrane, the Meguma Group, is largely composed of c. 10 km (6.2 mi) thick Cambrian to Ordovician turbidites that have been interpreted as submarine fan deposits. The Meguma terrane is joined to the Avalon terrane along the Minas Fault Zone, which runs east–west from Chedabucto Bay to Cobequid Bay and the Minas Basin. The Meguma Group is intruded by numerous Devonian and Carboniferous plutons.

The extent of the formation is unclear; some geologists believe that a magnetic anomaly along the coast of Cape Cod may represent a suture between the Meguma and Avalon terranes in that region. Unlike the Avalon terrane, the Meguma terrane has not been definitely associated with a territory on the other side of the Atlantic. It may be represented in either the Galicia-Tras-Os-Montes Zone in Spain and Portugal; the West African Craton in Morocco; or the Amazonian Craton. Meguma was, nevertheless, part of Gondwana during the Cambrian, and possibly formed a single peri-Gondwanan fragment together with Avalon. Meguma then became shortened during the Acadian orogeny but Avalon somehow escaped those Acadian deformations.

Geologically this area is of interest not only to students of geological history, but because metamorphism produced gold deposits which were mined extensively (up to 30,000 ozt/a (930 kg/a)) in the latter half of the 19th century, and which remain potentially exploitable today during periods of higher gold prices.

== See also ==
- Ganderia, also known as Gander terrane – Terrane in the northern Appalachians which broke off the supercontinent Gondwana
- Rheic Ocean – Ancient ocean which separated two major palaeocontinents, Gondwana and Laurussia
