= Ganderia =

Terrane in the northern Appalachians which broke off the supercontinent Gondwana

Ganderia or Gander Terrane (located near the town Gander, Newfoundland) is a terrane in the northern Appalachians which broke off the supercontinent Gondwana c. 570 million years ago (Ma) together with Avalonia, Megumia, and Carolinia.

== Extent ==
The microcontinent Avalonia broke off Gondwana in the Late Neoproterozoic together with a series of terranes that either formed its eastern coast or a separate block called Ganderia in front of it, if so separated from the Avalon Zone by the several hundred metres-wide Dover Fault. These terranes include the Early Palaeozoic siliciclastic rocks of the Gander Zone, the eastern passive margin of the Iapetus Ocean, now found in Newfoundland, New Brunswick, and New England, but they also include the contemporaneous or slightly older rocks of the Bras d'Or terrane in Cape Breton Island, the 550 Ma Upsalquitch gabbro, the Brookville and New River terranes in New Brunswick, and the Seven Hundred Acre Island in Maine. The Gander Zone also extends to the British Isles: Southeast Ireland, Anglesey, Isle of Man, and the Lake District. The western margin of Ganderia is the Red Indian Line of the Iapetus Suture.

== Tectonic history ==
The basement beneath Ganderia is unexposed, but the rock of the Green Head Group in southern New Brunswick, the oldest known, contains the Precambrian stromatolite Archaeozoon acadiense, and the Seven Hundred Acre Island Formation in coastal Maine has been dated to c. 670–1230 Ma, similar in age to that of the Amazonian Craton.

Between 640 and 455 Ma intermittent arc magmatism were separated by soft collisional events, first in the Late Ediacaran and Early Cambrian while Ganderia was part of Gondwana, and then in the Ordovician when Ganderia was an isolated microcontinent. The first early phase of arc magmatism occurred 625–605 Ma in the Brookville and New River terranes, but also in Anglesey. The next phase of arc magmatism accompanied by metamorphism occurred at the end of the Precambrian in Newfoundland, New Brunswick and on Cape Breton Island.

Ganderia probably separated from Gondwana near the Cambrian-Ordovician boundary when subduction ceased and an arc-back-arc system developed along a clastic passive margin. The separation of Ganderia opened the northern Rheic Ocean. Ganderia and Carolinia were probably connected during the Late Ediacaran and, if so, were collectively separated from Avalonia during the Early Palaeozoic.

When Ganderia was finally accreted to Laurentia during the Late Ordovician and Silurian large scale magmatism accompanied its subduction. Its accretion to Laurentia during the Late Ordovician closed large parts of the Iapetus Ocean and the accretion of its trailing edge resulted in the Salinic orogeny (the closure of the Tetagouche–Exploits back-arc basin). Avalonia was subsequently subducted beneath Ganderia during the Silurian and Devonian.
