= Trans-European Suture Zone =

Boundary between the East European Craton and the orogens of South-Western Europe

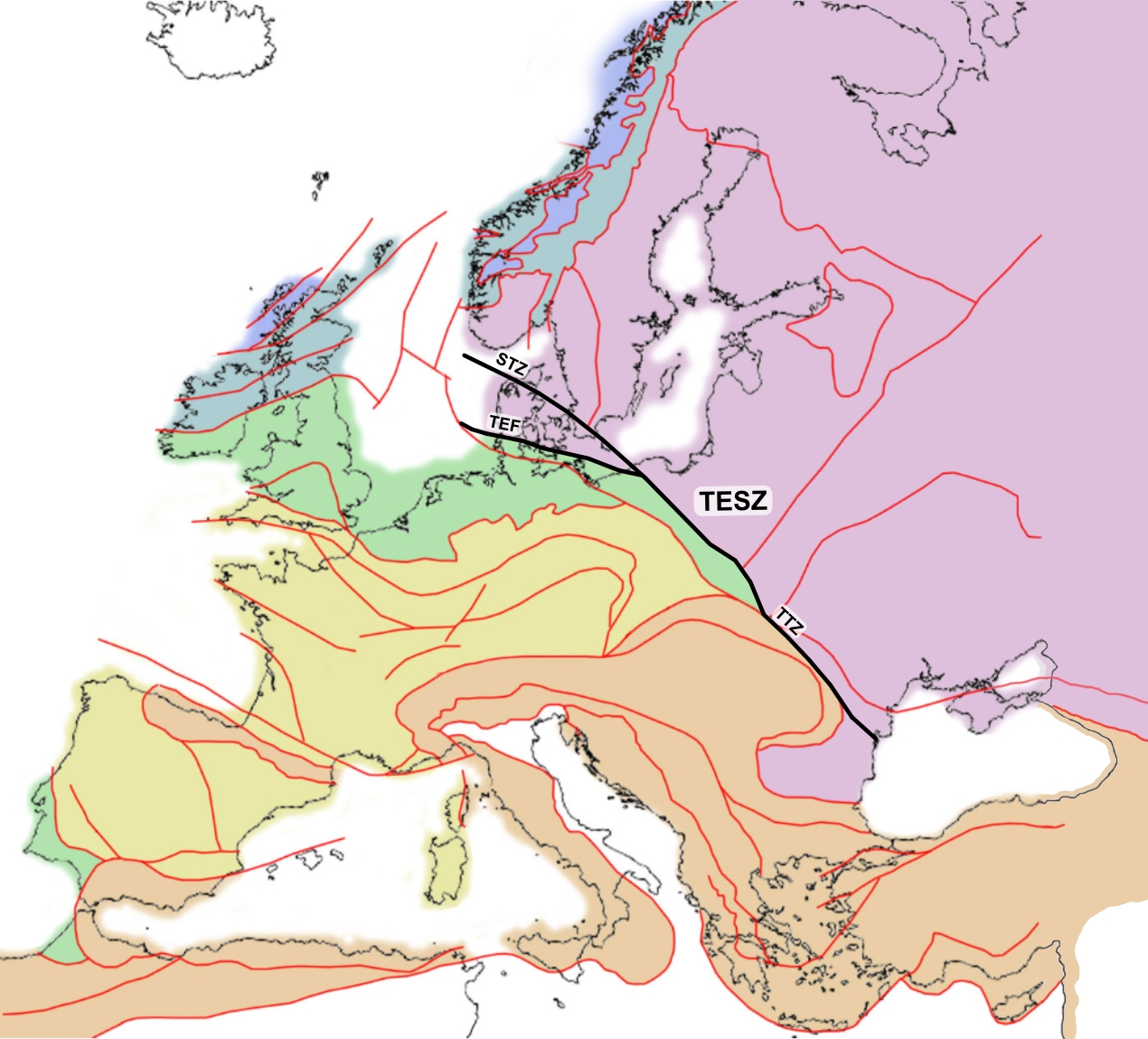
Geologic map of Europe showing the Baltic Shield and East European Platform ( ) and European orogenic belts (Caledonian ; Variscan ; Alpine ). Parts of the Trans-European Suture Zone (STZ, TEF and TTZ) are shown as bands of black colour between the North Sea and the Black Sea.

The Trans-European Suture Zone (TESZ), also known as the Tornquist Zone, is the crustal boundary between the Precambrian East European Craton and the Phanerozoic orogens of South-Western Europe. The zone runs from the North Sea to the Black Sea. The north-western part of the zone was created by the collision of Avalonia and Baltica/East European Craton in the Late Ordovician. The south-eastern part of the zone, now largely concealed by deep sedimentary basins, developed through Variscan and Alpine orogenic events.

Various branches of the TESZ go under different names:

- The Teisseyre-Tornquist Zone (TTZ) in Ukraine and Poland.
- The Sorgenfrei-Tornquist Zone (STZ) through Scania (Sweden), Kattegat, and North Jutland (Denmark).
- The Trans-European Fault (TEF), Thor-Tornquist Suture or Thor Suture through southern Denmark.

The latter two branches (STZ and TEF) span a triangular area of numerous faults, called the Tornquist Fan.

== Discovery ==
In 1893 the Polish geologist Wawrzyniec Teisseyre suggested the existence of a buried tectonic line close to the Carpathian Mountains. As part of his work on a Geological Atlas of Galicia he mapped the line from Galicia in Ukraine to south-eastern Poland. In 1908 the German geologist Alexander Tornquist mapped the continuation of the zone from Poland to Scania in Sweden.

== Tornquist Fan ==
Whereas the south-eastern part of the TESZ (Teisseyre-Tornquist Zone) is relatively well-confined, the north-western part divides into numerous sutures and faults, which fan out towards the North Sea and the Iapetus Suture which runs between the Scandinavian and Scottish Caledonides. It includes the following linear features (sorted from the north-east):

- The Fennoscandian Border Zone (FBZ) in Skagen and Kattegat
- The Sorgenfrei-Tornquist Zone (STZ), including many parallel horsts in Scania (e.g. Linderödsåsen and Söderåsen). This zone experienced extension in the Jurassic. In association to this event numerous monogenetic volcanoes sprang up in Central Scania.
- Ringkøbing-Fyn High (RFH)
- Caledonian Deformation Front (CDF)
- Trans-European Fault (TEF)

The Moho under the Tornquist Fan has a strong topography with depths varying between 26 and 48 km. It started forming during the Caledonian orogeny as a microcontinent or a series of terranes of Avalonian origin amalgamated with Baltica. Faults are believed to have continued forming until late Paleozoic.

== Teisseyre-Tornquist Zone ==
The Teisseyre-Tornquist Zone (TTZ), extending from Pomerania at the Baltic Sea to the Dobruja at the Black Sea, is primarily known from geophysical studies. Seismic data and gravity models suggest a strong contrast in crustal thickness, with 28–35 km down to the Moho to the west of the suture and 42–47 km to the east of it. The suture is believed to be buried under thick upper Paleozoic and Mesozoic sediments, and located further west than indicated by historical surface observations.

== See also ==
- Tornquist Sea – Sea between the palaeocontinents Avalonia and Baltica about 600 to 450 million years ago
- East European Craton – Geology of Europe
