= Turnquist =

Turnquist is a surname. Notable people with the surname include:

- Alexander Turnquist (born 1988), American guitarist and composer
- Taylor Turnquist (born 1997), American ice hockey player

== See also ==
- Turnquest, another surname
- Tornquist, another surname
