= Tornquist =

Tornquist or Törnquist or Tørnquist is a surname of Swedish origin. The word tornquist means "thorn branch". See also the spelling Törnqvist.

Tornquist may refer to:

- Tornquist, Buenos Aires, a city in Buenos Aires Province, Argentina
- Tornquist Partido, a district in Buenos Aires Province, Argentina
- Tornquist Bay, along the north coast of South Georgia
- Tornquist Sea, a paleo-sea between Baltica and Avalonia during early Paleozoic time
- Tornquist line, Tornquist Zone, Tornquist Fan: suture features running through Europe from the North Sea to the Black Sea

== People with the surname ==
- Alexander Tornquist (1868–1944), German-Austrian geologist
- Einar Tørnquist (born 1982), Norwegian comedian, talk-show host, and drummer
- Ernesto Tornquist (1842–1908), Argentine businessman
- Evie (singer) (born 1957) (Evie Karlsson, née Tornquist), American singer
- John Törnquist (1876–1937), Swedish missionary to Xinjiang
- Jorrit Tornquist (1938–2023), Austrian-Italian artist and color theorist
- Kristine Tornquist (born 1965), Austrian artist and stage director
- Ragnar Tørnquist (born 1970), Norwegian game designer and author
- Steffo Törnquist (born 1956), Swedish journalist
