= Turnquest =

Turnquest is a surname. Notable people with the surname include:

- K. Peter Turnquest (born 1964), Bahamian politician
- O. Tommy Turnquest (born 1959), Bahamian politician
- Orville Turnquest (born 1929), Bahamian politician, father of O. Tommy

== See also ==
- Turnquist, another surname
- Tornquist, another surname
