= Tornquist Sea =

Sea between the palaeocontinents Avalonia and Baltica about 600 to 450 million years ago

The Tornquist Sea or Tornquist Ocean was a sea located between the palaeocontinents Avalonia and Baltica about 600 to 450 million years ago. The remains of the sea today form a suture stretching across northern Europe (Tornquist Zone).

== Geologic evolution ==
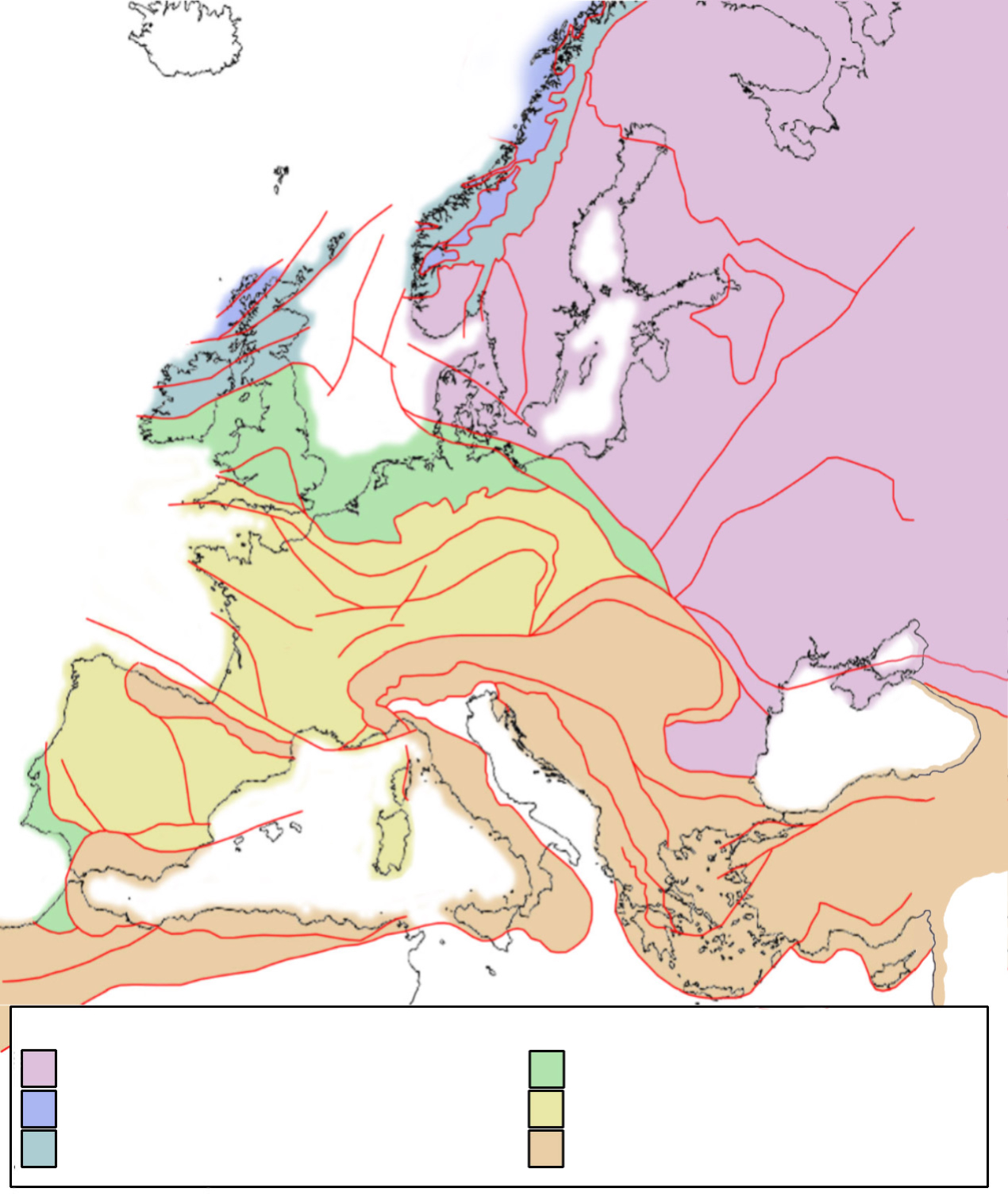

It probably formed at the same time (c. 600 Ma) as the Iapetus Ocean. Gondwana, including Avalonia until Early Ordovician, was separate from Baltica throughout the Cambrian. It probably closed during the Late Ordovician at the time of the Shelveian Orogeny of western England.

There are faunal, palaeomagnetic, palaeogeographic, and apparent polar wander path evidence for the timing of closure for Eastern Avalonia (England, Wales and southern Ireland) and Baltica.

The Baltica-Avalonia collision also resulted in that the Rheic Ocean ceased to expand south of Avalonia around 450 Ma, in huge magmatism in Avalonia, gigantic ash fall in Baltica, and metamorphism in present-day northern Germany.

== Present-day suture ==
The suture resulting from closure of the Tornquist Sea may be seen in eastern England and the Lake District as an arc of igneous rocks belonging to the Ordovician. The volcanic series in eastern England, the Ardennes and the Northern Phyllite Belt originated between the Tornquist Sea and the Rheic Ocean during the Ordovician and Silurian.

Where Baltica and Avalonia finally collided is now a suture known as the Teisseyre-Tornquist Line or Zone; named after its discoverers, Polish geologist Wawrzyniec Teisseyre and German geologist Alexander Tornquist. This lineament still marks the transition between, on one hand, the East and North European Pre-Cambrian Craton and, on the other hand, the West European and Mediterranean Palaeozoic Orogenes. It is part of a wider deformation zone running across Europe, from the British Isles to the Black Sea, known as the Trans-European Suture Zone (TESZ).
