= Carolina terrane =

Exotic terrane from central Georgia to central Virginia in the United States

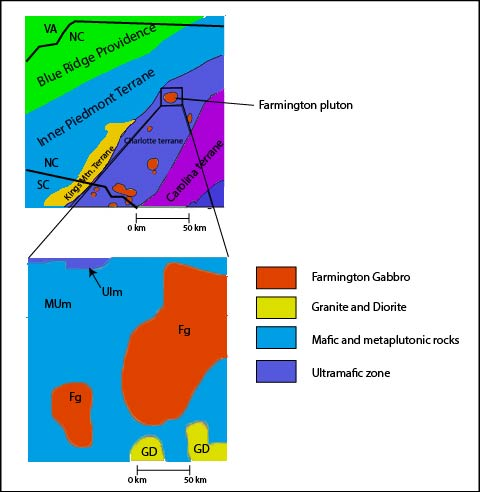
Carolina terrane - map

The Carolina Terrane, also called the Carolina Superterrane or Carolinia, is an exotic terrane running ~370 miles (600 km) approximately North-South from central Georgia to central Virginia in the United States. It constitutes a major part of the eastern Piedmont Province.

The terrane likely formed as a subduction-related volcanic island arc off the coast of South America (then Gondwana) during the Neoproterozoic to Early Cambrian (625–550 MYA). Plate tectonics moved it across the Iapetus Ocean until it docked with Laurentia (now the east coast of North America). The date of the docking is unknown, but could have occurred during the Taconic, Acadian, or Alleghanian Orogenies.

The terrane comprises Neoproterozoic to Early Cambrian meta-sedimentary and meta-igneous rocks, intruded by later Paleozoic plutons. The protoliths of the meta-igneous rocks include mafic, intermediate, and felsic volcanics and plutons. These rocks underwent at least four metamorphic/deformation events, and so their original textures and mineralogies have been significantly altered.

As with related peri-Gondwanan terranes (e.g., Avalonia and Gander), the Carolina Terrane played a major role in the tectonic evolution of the east coast of North America during the Paleozoic. It represents the largest exotic terrane in the Appalachians, and underlies an enormous area of the southeastern United States.

== Origin and Evolution ==
The Carolina Terrane's history begins in the Neoproterozoic, as the Rodinia supercontinent was breaking apart:

1. Opening of the Paleoasian Ocean. As the Rodinia supercontinent broke apart, the Paleoasian Ocean opened between Baltica and Gondwana.
2. Island Arc Formation. Between 625 and 550 Ma, a subduction zone initiated in the Paleoasian Ocean between Baltica and Gondwana. The subduction produced a string of volcanic island arcs off the coast of Gondwana, (peri-Gondwanan) including the Carolina Terrane, Avalonia microcontinent, and Gander Terrane. It is unclear whether the arc formed on oceanic or continental crust.
3. Opening of the Iapetus Ocean. As the Rodinia supercontinent continued to break apart, the Iapetus Ocean opened, splitting apart Laurentia, Baltica and Gondwana. The opening may have started as early as 760 Ma, though the major part appears to be later (~610 Ma; Kamo et al. 1989; Cawood et al. 2001), and the southern portion (between Laurentia and now-South America) may not have finish until 550 Ma.
4. Metamorphic/Deformation Event of Unknown Cause: Upper-crustal folding, faulting, and mineral foliation during the Late Neoproterozoic / Early Cambrian (612–544 Ma); it is unclear whether this represents a regional or local event, or event what the event was. Proposed possible causes include back-arc rifting or closure, subduction of another block, or collision of the Charlotte and Carolina terranes.
5. Migration of the Island Arcs & Opening of the Rheic Ocean. At some point in the Late-Cambrian/Early-Ordovician (~500 Ma), the subduction zone off the coast of Gondwana caused a back-arc basin to rift. The new spreading center opened the Rheic Ocean between the Carolina-Avalonia-Gander terranes and Gondwana. The combination of slab rollback and ridge-push moved the Carolina-Avalonia-Gander terranes north across the Iapetus Ocean, toward Laurentia and Baltica. Avalonia would dock with Baltica before they both collided with Laurentia; the Carolina Terrane appears to have not docked with Baltica.
6. Metamorphic/Deformation Event of Unknown Cause: The Carolina Terrane underwent another metamorphic event during the Late Ordovician/Silurian (480–450 Ma), which brought its rocks to greenschist facies. This time period broadly conforms to the Taconic Orogeny, and could represent the docking of Carolina onto Laurentia.
7. Cat Square Terrane Formation. As the Carolina Terrane approached Laurentia (~430–380 Ma), the Cat Square Terrane formed in the ocean basin between Laurentia and the approaching Carolina Terrane. It's possible it formed as an accretionary prism in front of the Carolina Terrane.
8. Metamorphic/Deformation Event of Unknown Cause: The Carolina Terrane underwent another metamorphic event during the Devonian (358–391 Ma). This time period broadly conforms to the Acadian Orogeny, and could represent the docking of Carolina onto Laurentia.
9. Docking with Laurentia. It is unclear exactly when the Carolina Terrane docked with Laurentia. Hypotheses include accretion during the Taconic Orogeny, Acadian Orogeny, or Alleghanian Orogeny. See summary of evidence for each in.
10. Alleghanian Metamorphism. The Carolina Terrane was metamorphosed again during the Alleghanian Orogeny, reaching greenschist facies in the Eastern Slate Belt and amphibolite facies in the Charlotte Terrane.

== Relationships to Nearby Terranes ==
The Carolina Terrane is part of the larger Carolina Zone, which includes several related terranes: the Charlotte Terrane, Falls Lake Terrane, Crabtree Terrane, Raleigh Terrane, Spring Hope Terrane, Roanoke Rapids Terrane, Uchee Terrane, Savannah River Terrane, Augusta Terrane, Milledgeville Terrane, Triplet Terrane, and Dreher Shoals Terrane.

In addition to the related terranes of the Carolina Zone, the Carolina Terrane is adjacent to several possibly-unrelated terranes, including:

- Cat Square Terrane. a strip of metamorphosed sedimentary rocks east of the Tugaloo Terrane. These rocks were likely deposited as greywackes and pelites between 430 and ~380 million years ago. They were likely originally deposited in the shallow ocean basin between Laurentia and the approaching Carolina Terrane (detrital zircons from both Laurentia and the Carolina Terrane have been identified in the Cat Square deposits).
- Goochland Terrane: a strip of metamorphic rocks running along the northeast boundary of the Carolina Terrane. It is unclear how this zone is related to the Carolina Terrane. The Raleigh-Goochland Terrane is intruded by Neoproterozoic alkalic granite plutons, which could be related to Carolina Terrane arc volcanism (in which case, the Raleigh-Goochland Terrane may represent the basement of the Carolina Terrane), or the plutons could be related to Rodinia-related rifting along the margins of Laurentia (in which case, it may represent a displaced fragment of Laurentia).

To the southeast of the Carolina terrane is the Suwannee terrane, formerly part of what is now West Africa in Gondwana. The smaller Charleston terrane collided with Gondwana in the Mesoproterozoic, and has remained attached to what became the Suwannee terrane since then. Laurentia (the ancient core of North America) collided with Gondwana in the Neoproterozoic, forming Pangaea and attaching to the Charleston terrane and what would become the Suwannee terrane. When Pangaea began breaking up in the Early Jurassic, rifting separated the Suwanne terrane (and the attached Charleston terrane) from Africa and left it attached to North America. The Suwannee terrane (including the Charleston terrane) underlies much of Florida, southern Alabama and Georgia, coastal South Carolina, and much of the continental shelf adjacent to those states and to North Carolina to a point north of Cape Lookout.

== See also ==
- Two Dogs Site, ancient lithic quarry in the Carolina Slate Belt
