= Acadian orogeny =

North American orogeny

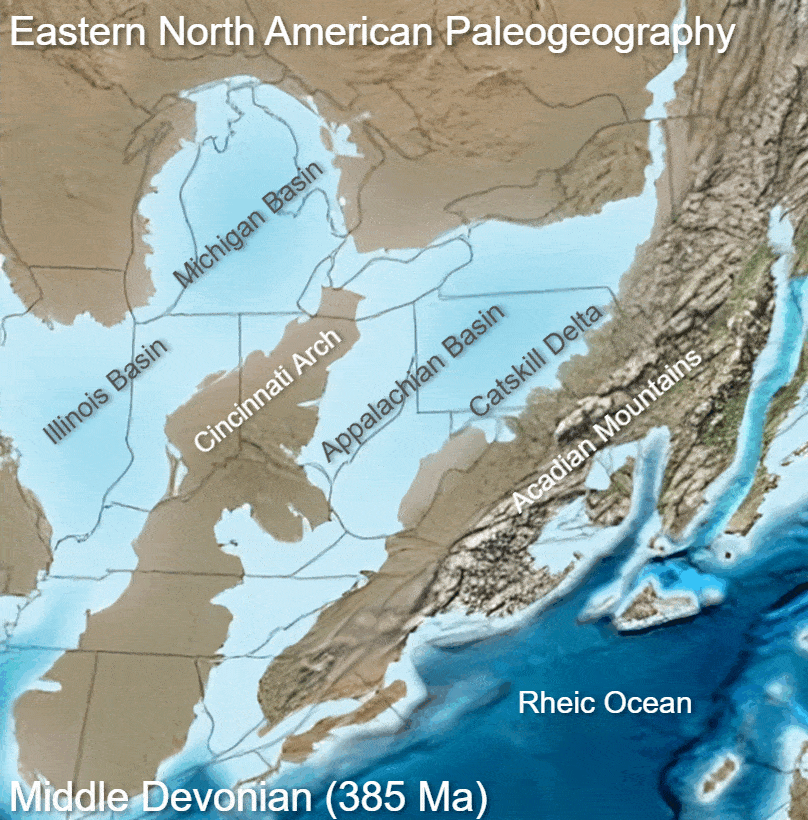
Paleogeographic reconstruction showing the Appalachian Basin area during the Middle Devonian period.

The Acadian orogeny was a long-lived mountain building event that began in the Middle Devonian and reached its climax during the Late Devonian. It was active for approximately 50 million years, beginning roughly around 375 million years ago (Ma), with deformational, plutonic, and metamorphic events extending into the early Mississippian. The Acadian orogeny is the third of the four orogenies that formed the Appalachian Mountains and subsequent basin. The preceding orogenies consisted of the Grenville and Taconic orogenies, which followed a rift/drift stage in the Neoproterozoic. The Acadian orogeny involved the collision of a series of Avalonian continental fragments with the Laurasian continent. Geographically, the Acadian orogeny extended from the Canadian Maritime provinces migrating in a southwesterly direction toward Alabama. However, the northern Appalachian region, from New England northeastward into Gaspé region of Canada, was the most greatly affected region by the collision.

It was roughly contemporaneous with the Bretonic phase of the Variscan orogeny of Laurussia, with metamorphic events in southwestern Texas and northern Mexico, and with the Antler orogeny of the Great Basin.

== Palaeogeography ==
During the time of the Acadian orogeny, Middle Devonian (385 Ma), the paleolatitude of the Laurentia was in the Southern Hemisphere near the equator, between 0° to 30°S latitude. Laurentia did not change much with respect to paleolatitude during the Devonian. Gondwana, on the other hand, traveled a large distance, such that in the Ordovician the South Pole was located in northern Africa, where it then moved west of southern Chile during the Silurian, and moved back to central Africa during the Devonian. However, more recent research, from Scotese & McKerrow, suggests that in Late Devonian, the South Pole was in north-central Argentina rather than northern Africa, which was supported with paleoclimatic evidence. The paleolatitude of Gondwana during the Middle to Late Devonian resided around intermediate latitudes of about 50°S.

The collision initiating the Acadian orogeny resulted in the closing of the southern Iapetus Ocean and the formation of a high mountain belt. After the Acadian collision took place, Gondwana began to retreat from Laurentia with the newly accreted Avalonian terranes left behind. As Gondwana moved away, a new ocean opened up, the Rheic Ocean, during the Middle to Late Devonian, and subsequently its closure resulted in the formation of the Alleghanian orogeny.

=== Laurentia ===
Laurentia is the North American paleocontinent, which also includes present day northwest Ireland, Scotland, Greenland, the north slope of Alaska, and the Chukotsk Peninsula of northeastern Russia. During the Ordovician-Devonian time, Laurentia remained at the same paleolatitude, slightly south of the equator in the southern hemisphere, with relatively the same paleolongitude. Major defining tectonic events include the Neoproterozoic rift sequence from the breakup of Grenville basement rocks, thermal subsidence related to the Early Cambrian to Middle Ordovician drift sequence during the opening of the Iapetus Ocean, the Appalachian accretionary events to the eastern continental margin, and the resulting foreland-basin and clastic wedges.

=== Avalonian terranes ===
Avalonian terranes that constitute Avalonia are the following modern-day regions: northern France, Belgium (the Ardennes), England, Wales, southeastern Ireland, eastern Newfoundland, Nova Scotia, southern New Brunswick and some coastal parts of New England. The basement consisted of Late Precambrian age arc rocks and is believed to come from the margin of Gondwana, sometime in the Early Ordovician. Avalonia rifted from Gondwana during the onset of igneous activity in the Ardennes, Wales, and southeast Ireland that consumed the Tornquist Sea oceanic crust. It drifted in a northerly direction and probably collided with Baltica in the Late Ordovician, and then with Laurentia in the Late Devonian. Evidence for this is consistent with paleomagnetic data which place Avalonia at a temperate latitude during the Ordovician and in a subtropical latitude during the Late Ordovician through the Devonian.

== Overview of events ==
The Acadian orogeny resulted from oblique convergence or major transcurrent movement along a large strike-slip fault which represents the zone of convergence between Laurussia/Laurentia and Avalon terranes. One or more of the Avalonian terranes accreted with the eastern margin of Laurentia, most likely beginning in the late Early Devonian.

The evidence for the Acadian orogeny is abundant and widespread in the northern Appalachians, recorded by the plutonism and the migration of the northern Appalachian deformation front toward the craton. In the central to southern Appalachians, evidence for the Acadian orogeny is poor and is found primarily in the plutonism of the Blue Ridge and metamorphism of the Cat Square terrane.

The Acadian orogeny experienced at least three major phases of deformation, and in places, unconformities are recognized. These phases are called tectophases and represent the sequence of collisions that occurred from the Avalonian terranes accreting to Laurentia. As a result of these tectophases, deltas developed on the adjacent parts of the stable craton, eastern margin of Laurentia. These deltas are described as foreland-basin, delta-complex clastic wedges, which are responsible for the large volumes of sediment input into the Appalachian basin.

=== Collision ===
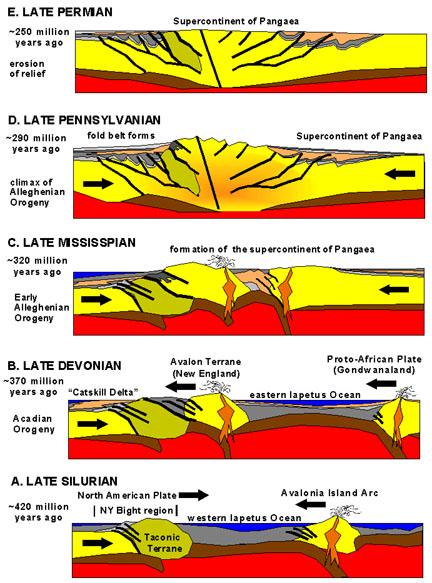
The Appalachian Orogeny, a result of three separate continental collisions. USGS

The collision of Avalonia with Laurentia initiated a sequence of events where the older rocks were subjected to deformation, plutonism, metamorphism, and uplift that occurred over a large area of eastern Laurentia. During the course of the orogeny, new faults formed, while older faults were reactivated. Acadian deformation and metamorphism were asymmetric across the strike of the orogen. The Acadian plutons intruded every belt, unlike the deformation/metamorphism, of Avalonia which did not undergo much of the alteration shown in other localities. During the Middle Devonian, centers for volcanoes and uplift formed in the New England region and shed fine-grained clastic material into an inland seaway that covered a large part of southern and central Appalachia. Today, portions of the ancient Avalonia landmass occur in scattered outcrop belts along the eastern margin of North America. One belt occurs in Newfoundland; another forms the bedrock of much of the coastal region of New England from eastern Connecticut to northern Maine, where it is known as the Coastal Lithotectonic Block.

The collision between Laurentia and Avalonian terranes is actually more complex than described above. The collision is broken into three or possibly four tectophases which represent a successive collision of the Avalonian terranes with eastern Laurentia.

==== Tectophases ====
Because major clastic wedges and basinal deposits are distributed in a southwestward progression, it is assumed they originated from areas near promontories, areas along the continental margin where deformation is concentrated. The earliest tectophase was located at the St. Lawrence promontory in northern New England and in the Canadian Maritime Provinces. The St. Lawrence tectophase was active during the Early to Middle Devonian with intense transpressional deformation which formed a basin in the Gaspé Peninsula, northern New Brunswick, and northern New England. Clastic wedges were present in this area, but the evidence for them has been mostly destroyed by succeeding tectonism.

The second tectophase, during the Middle Devonian, represents the collision with the New York promontory. The southward migration of deformation reflected the third tectophase, which marks the collision of Avalon terranes with the Virginia promontory in the Middle to Late Devonian time. The effects of the New York and Virginia promontories together produced the Catskill Delta complex.

As the migration of deformation continued southward along the fault zone, during the Early Mississippian time, the final collision occurred with the Alabama promontory . Ettensohn refers to the fourth tectophase as the Mississippian tectophase of the Acadian orogeny, since it demonstrated an unusually long duration (Mississippian-Early Pennsylvanian). Subsequently, the Pocono and equivalent clastic wedges essentially filled the epicontinental sea. The deposition of Middle Mississippian carbonates marks the end of the Acadian orogeny and Catskill Delta complex.

=== Foreland basin ===
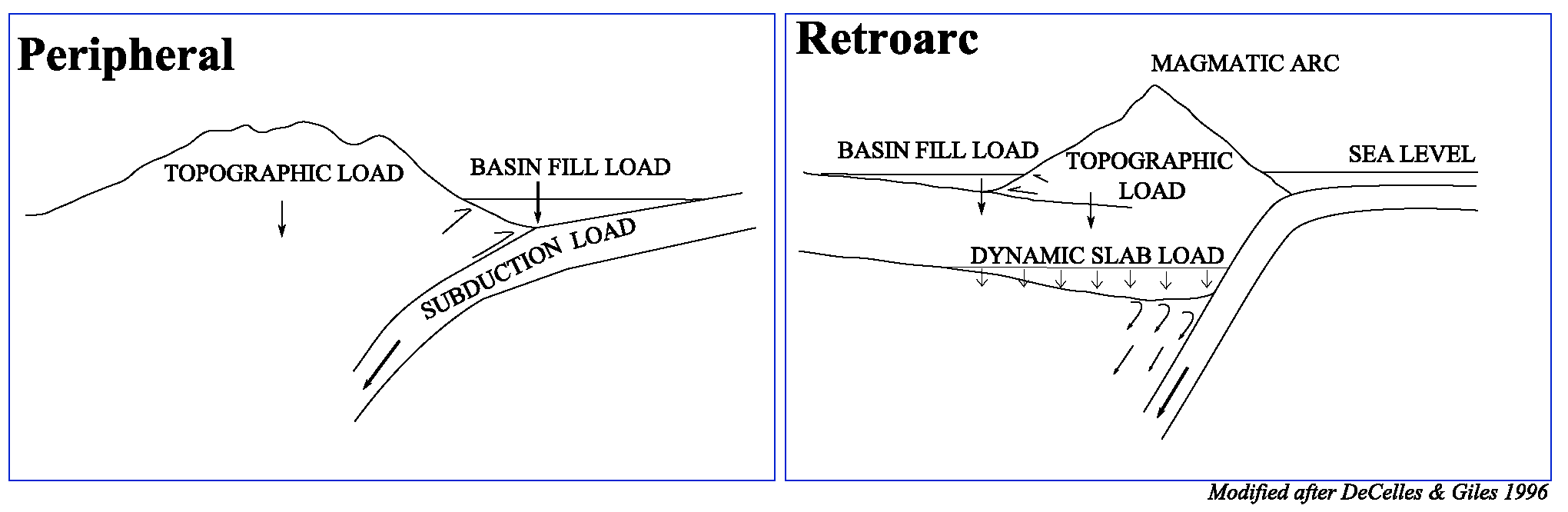
The Acadian foreland basin is a retroarc

Foreland basins are a product of tectonic deformational loading, or crustal thickening along the orogen, a consequence of overthrusting and folding. The Acadian foreland basin is categorized as a retroarc foreland basin, which occurs on the overriding continental lithosphere, adjacent to a foreland fold-thrust belt behind a continental margin arc. The initial result of loading is a bulge move out and uplift of the foreland, which generates a localized unconformity. The distributions of unconformities display an asymmetric pattern in relation to the promontories. Subsidence follows bulge movement and uplift and is produced on the cratonic side of the orogen due to regional isostatic adjustment to the load by the lithosphere. Once thrust propagation declines, substantial relief and drainage nets have had time to develop, and the as a resulting coarser clastic sediment is eroded and transported to the foreland basin.

The basement structures of the Appalachian foreland basin at the onset of the Acadian orogeny were reactivated during foreland lithospheric flexure. These structures affected the foreland basin evolution and sedimentation patterns, and the preexisting faults partitioned the basin into regions of fault-controlled uplift and depocenters.

=== Delta complex ===
The Appalachian basin, during the Middle Devonian and Early Mississippian, is characterized by large volumes of deltaic sedimentary rocks that were deposited in the Acadian foreland basin as a response to the Acadian orogeny. These deposits extend from central New York and Pennsylvania westward to Ohio, and south along the Appalachian Mountains through Virginia and Tennessee to Alabama. The Acadian delta complex is categorized into two deltas, the Catskill Delta of Middle and Upper Devonian age, and the Price-Rockwell in the Pocono Mountains delta of Late Devonian and Early Mississippian age. The Acadian delta complex is coupled to the four tectophases of the Acadian orogeny, both in terms of provenance and depositional settings. The relief resulting from the orogeny was the fundamental source of the delta sediments.

The Catskill Delta complex consists of a coarsening upward sequence of rocks. Its thickness is greatest in eastern Pennsylvania and thins westward into Ohio. The Catskill paleogeography appears to consist of many small streams, which deposited their sedimentary load along a coastal alluvial plain that was hundreds of miles long.

Generalized stratigraphic nomenclature for the Middle Devonian strata in the Appalachian Basin

The Middle Devonian to Lower Mississippian siliciclastic strata, deposited by the Catskill Delta, includes black shale, gray shale, sandstone, red beds, and minor argillaceous limestone. The strata was deposited in a four-stage pattern that is observed in each tectophase. The formation of the foreland basin through rapid subsidence initiated transgressive sequences that deposited basinal black shales. After the black shales were deposited, the migration of deformation continued southward, and regression dominated, particularly on the east side of the basin. As collision intensified, subsidence in the foreland basin declined, and sedimentation was replaced by an influx of calcareous silty shales and carbonates. These deposits reflect small transgressive-regressive cycles in a delta-front and delta platform environments. The third stage is represented by regional uplift, which accompanied the collision of an Avalon terrane with a promontory, and subsequently, developed a regional disconformity. The fourth and final stage is represented by tectonic quiescence with a widespread carbonate deposition in a slowly transgressing sea.

== See also ==
- Central Pangean Mountains
