= Ukasiksalik Island =

Island in Davis Inlet, Labrador, Canada

Ukasiksalik
- Interactive map of Ukasiksalik

Geography
- Coordinates: 55.897839°N 60.79628°W
- Area: 99 km^{2} (38 sq mi)
- Length: 11 km (6.8 mi)
- Width: 9 km (5.6 mi)

Administration
- Canada
- Province: Newfoundland and Labrador

Ukasiksalik Island (also known as Newfoundland Island or Freestone Island) is a small island located in Davis Inlet, Labrador, Canada. It is part of the province of Newfoundland and Labrador, but is distinct from the island of Newfoundland, the largest and most populous island in the province.

In 1980, government archaeologists were given a sample of "Freestone Harbor" soapstone from the quarry at the northeastern end of Ukasiksalik Island.
