= Tetagouche Falls, New Brunswick =

Waterfall in New Brunswick, Canada

Tetagouche Falls
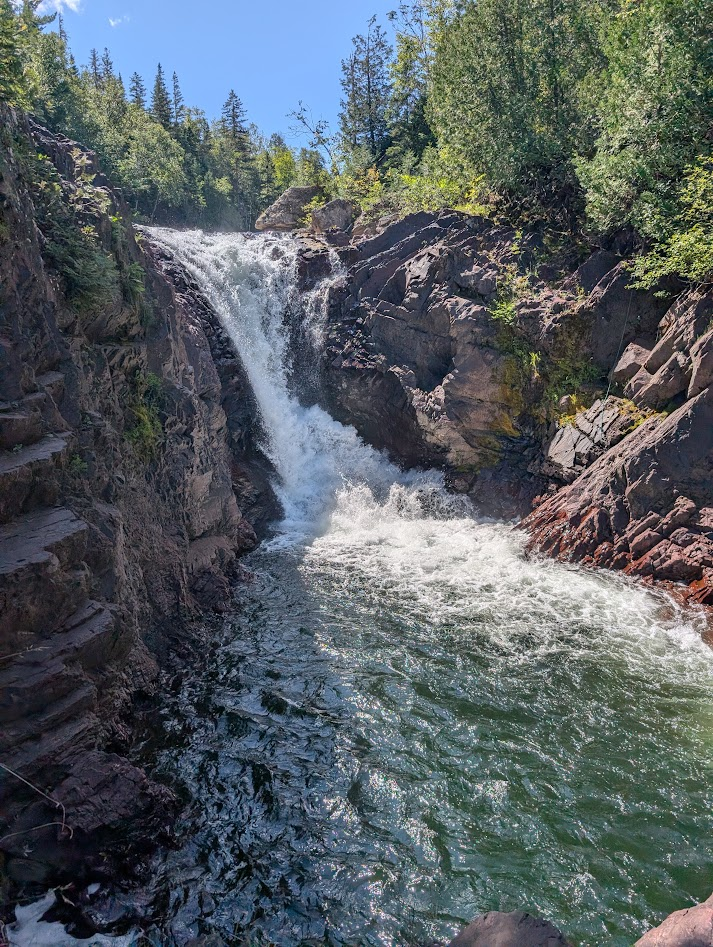
- Falls in August 2026
- Interactive map of Tetagouche Falls
- Location: Near South Tetagouche, New Brunswick, Canada
- Coordinates: 47°37′2″N 65°49′31″W
- Watercourse: Tetagouche River

Tetagouche Falls is a waterfall and former hydro-electric dam site near the settlement of South Tetagouche, in the province of New Brunswick, Canada, on the Tetagouche River. Tetagouche Falls is a waterfall and former hydro-electric dam site near the settlement of South Tetagouche, in the Eastern Canadian province of New Brunswick on the Tetagouche River. It is located approximately 9 km (5.6 mi) west of the town of Bathurst.

== History ==
Tetagouche Falls’ mining history began in the 1840s, when prospector William Stevens of Cornwall, England began exploring for minerals in the area. A manganite-bearing quartz vein was discovered on the south bank of the river in 1842 and that same year the Gloucester Mining Association shipped 125 tons of manganese ore to England. This operation, which also resulted in extraction of copper, is one of the earliest examples of underground mining in New Brunswick. Mining activity continued at the falls until 1864 when the ore could no longer be mined at a profit, and the operation was shut down. It was a decisive moment in Tetagouche history as families chose between returning to their native countries, moving to another mining town, or staying to adapt and become full-time farmers. Many chose the latter and today descendants of the original Smyth, Payne, Ward, and Macintosh families still reside in the South Tetagouche area.

Throughout the 1900s the Tetagouche River hosted spring log drives and along the river there were several saw, grist and carding mills. In the early 1900s Tetagouche Falls was identified as a possible source of electricity by John P. Leger, an established Bathurst businessman. Leger, who had a vision of bringing electricity to Bathurst, realized that a dam at Tetagouche Falls could potentially power the city of Bathurst for most of the year. In 1904, the incorporation of Bathurst Electric and Water Power Company Limited was formed by Act of Assembly leading to the early construction of a hydro-electric plant further downriver at Tetagouche Bridge. Leger acquired the right to harness power at Tetagouche Falls in 1911, and construction of the dam was completed the following year. The endeavor helped to accelerate the town of Bathurst into the modern age; the hydro-electric dam at Tetagouche Falls was the first of its kind in New Brunswick. In 1919, the Bathurst Lumber Company amalgamated with the Bathurst Electric and Water Power Company which led to the building of a much larger dam at Grand Falls on the Nepisiguit River. The Tetagouche Falls dam continued to power the city of Bathurst until 1921, when the newly completed Grand Falls dam took over the load.

Today the dam’s remnants still stand high above the falls as a reminder of its industrial history. However, over the years, ice and erosion has washed away the vulnerable center portion of the dam leaving only the side walls, piping, and the remains of one of the turbines. A park and nature trail are maintained by Gloucester County at the site.

== See also ==
- List of communities in New Brunswick
