= Wawrzyniec Teisseyre =

Polish geologist

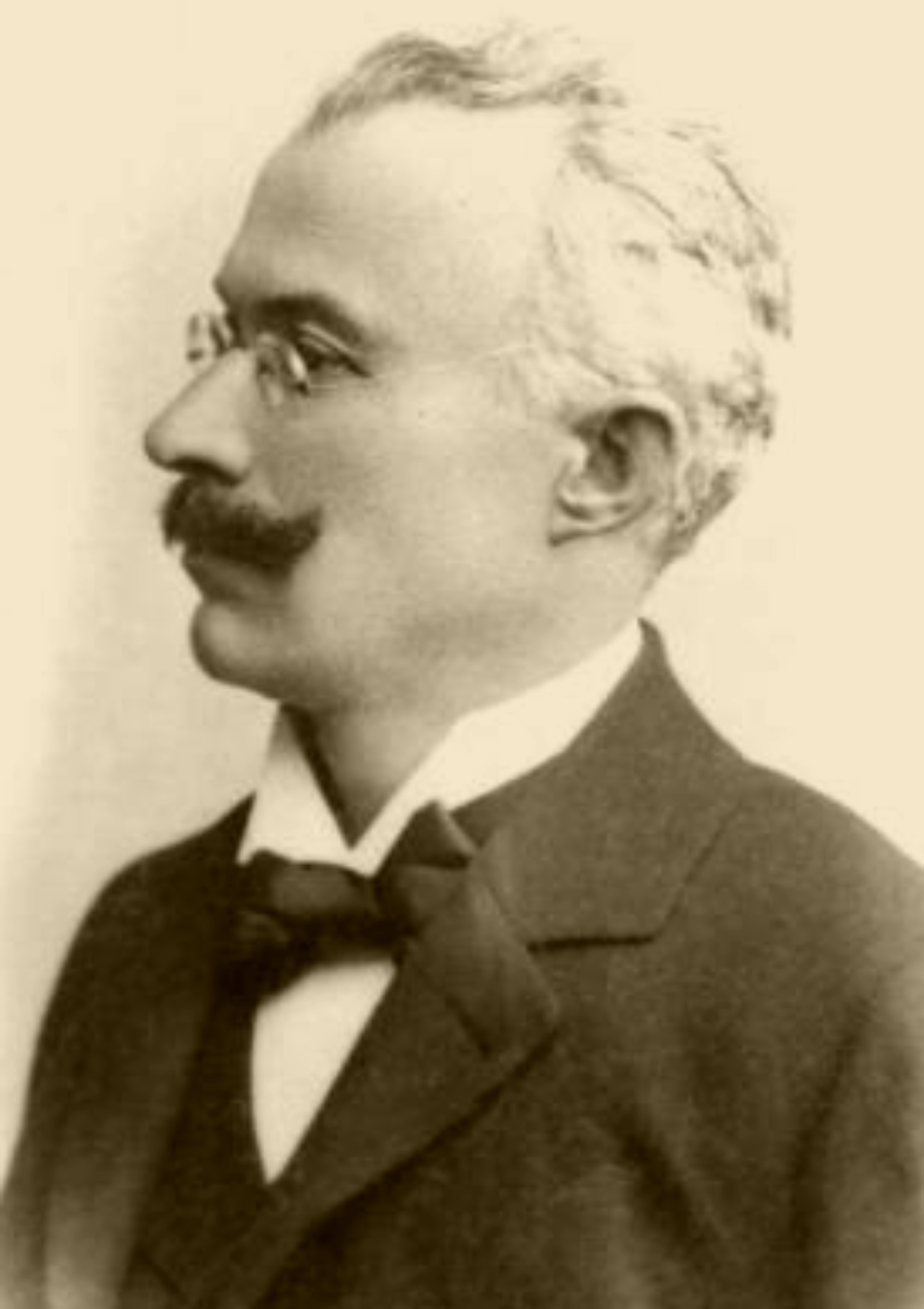
Wawrzyniec Teisseyre

Wawrzyniec Karol de Teisseyre (10 August 1860 – 2 May 1939) was a Polish geologist. He is known for his work on the southern part of the Trans European Suture Zone and Galician and Romanian geology.

Wawrzyniec Teisseyre was born in Kraków, Austrian Empire of French ancestry. He studied at the University of Vienna and the Mining Academy in Leoben (Austria) and worked at the institutes of geology in Vienna and Bucharest. As part of his work on the Geological Atlas of Galicia, he mapped the southern part of the Trans European Suture Zone (Teisseyre-Tornquist Zone) and associated features of the Carpathian Mountains. During his time in Bucharest he investigated oil deposits of Romania.

== See also ==
- Teisseyre-Tornquist Zone
