= Alexander Tornquist =

German-Austrian geologist (1868–1944)

- Born: 18 June 1868; Hamburg, North German Confederation
- Died: 1 November 1944 (aged 76); Graz, Austria
- Other names: Tornquist, Alexander Johannes Heinrich
- Occupation: Geologist

Alexander Tornquist (18 June 1868 in Hamburg – 1 November 1944, Graz) was a German-Austrian geologist, who is known for his work on the northern part of the Trans European Suture Zone and on Mediterranean geology.

== Biography ==
Alexander Tornquist was son of the merchant Alexander Heinrich Tornquist and Minna Mathilde Tornquist, née Fett. He studied at the University of Freiburg, the Ludwig-Maximilians-Universität München, and the University of Göttingen. In 1892, he received a PhD in geology and paleontology at the University of Göttingen. In 1901, he obtained an associate professorship for geology and paleontology at the University of Strasbourg, and in 1907 became a full professor at the University of Königsberg. At the University of Königsberg, he also served as director of the famous Prussian amber collection and of the institute of seismology. He spent his later life in Graz, where he had a professorship at the Imperial-Royal Technical College in Graz from 1914 onward. From 1915 to 1918, he served as dean to the chemo-technical faculty. From 1924 to 1926, Tornquist was rector of the Technical College. Tornquistʹs bona fide involvement and expertise in the so called West-Styrian beryl-scandal around fraudster Emil Johann Paul Mehling (alias Dr. Kurt Seidler) in the years 1929 and 1930 led to his early retirement from the university in 1933.

In 1897, Alexander Tornquist married Anna Elisabeth Henze, who was born on 9 February 1877 in Dresden and daughter of a sculptor. They had five children. Their daughter Erika (1903–1962) was married to Caspar Neher who is known for his lifelong cooperation with Bertolt Brecht. Alexander Tornquistʹs son Martin Wolfgang Tornquist (born on 31 May 1900 in Strasbourg) was a painter and studied at the Academy of Fine Arts, Munich, where he befriended Neher. Martin was diagnosed with schizophrenia in 1925, repeatedly admitted to different psychiatric institutions and not released after a stay at the end of 1940. He died on 11 February 1945 becoming thus a victim of so-called euthanasia.

Alexander Tornquist died in 1944 during an air raid on Graz, together with his wife and his sister Ellen Tornquist, who was born on 24 June 1872 in Hamburg and worked as a painter.

== Selected works ==
- Das vicentinische Triasgebirge. Eine geologische Monographie, 1901 – The Vicentine Triassic, a geological monograph.
- Geologischer Führer durch Ober-Italien, 1902 – Geological guide through northern Italy.
- Die oberitalienischen Seen, 1910 – The northern Italian lakes.
- Der baltische Bernstein: Einleitung in das Verständnis der Kgl. Bernsteinsammlung des Geologischen Instituts in Königsberg i. Pr. , 1910 – The Baltic amber: Introduction for understanding the royal amber collection of the geological institute in Königsberg in Prussia
- Geologie von Ostpreußen, 1910 – Geology of eastern Prussia
- Grundzüge der geologischen Formations- und Gebirgskunde für Studierende der Naturwissenschaften, der Geographie und des Bergfaches, 1913 – Basics of geological formations and mountain studies, etc.
- Geologie, 1916.
- Grundzüge der allgemeinen Geologie, für Studierende der Naturwissenschaften, der Geographie und der technischen Wissenschaften, 1916 – Basics of general geology, for students of the natural sciences, geography and technical sciences.

== See also ==
- Tornquist Sea
- Tornquist Zone
