= Suture (geology) =

Joining together of separate terranes along a major fault zone

In structural geology, a suture is a joining along a major fault zone, of separate terranes, tectonic units that have different plate tectonic, metamorphic and paleogeographic histories. The suture is often represented on the surface by an orogen or mountain range.

== Overview ==
In plate tectonics, sutures are the remains of subduction zones, and the terranes that are joined are interpreted as fragments of different palaeocontinents or tectonic plates.

Outcrops of sutures can vary in width from a few hundred meters to a couple of kilometers. They can be networks of mylonitic shear zones or brittle fault zones, but are usually both. Sutures are usually associated with igneous intrusions and tectonic lenses with varying kinds of lithologies from plutonic rocks to ophiolitic fragments.

An example from Great Britain is the Iapetus Suture which, though now concealed beneath younger rocks, has been determined by geophysical means to run along a line roughly parallel with the Anglo-Scottish border and represents the joint between the former continent of Laurentia to the north and the former micro-continent of Avalonia to the south. Avalonia is in fact a plain which dips steeply northwestwards through the crust, underthrusting Laurentia.

== Paleontological use ==
When used in paleontology, suture can also refer to fossil exoskeletons, as in the suture line, a division on a trilobite between the free cheek and the fixed cheek; this suture line allowed the trilobite to perform ecdysis (the shedding of its skin).
