= Avalonia =

Microcontinent in the Paleozoic era

Location of the Caledonian/Acadian mountain chains in the Early Devonian Epoch. Present day coastlines are shown for reference. Red lines are sutures, capitalized names are the different continents/super-terranes that joined during the Caledonian orogeny.

Avalonia was a microcontinent in the Paleozoic era. Crustal fragments of this former microcontinent are terranes in parts of the eastern coast of North America: Atlantic Canada, and parts of the East Coast of the United States. In addition, terranes derived from Avalonia also make up portions of Northwestern Europe, being found in England, Wales and parts of Ireland.

Avalonia developed as a volcanic arc on the northern margin of Gondwana. It eventually rifted off, becoming a drifting microcontinent. The Rheic Ocean formed behind it, and the Iapetus Ocean shrank in front. It collided with the continents Baltica, then Laurentia. The Armorican Terrane assemblage collided with the merged Baltica/Avalonia during the formation of Pangea. When Pangea broke up, Avalonia's remains were divided by the rift which became the Atlantic Ocean.

Avalonia is named for the Avalon Peninsula in Newfoundland.

When the term "Avalon" was coined by Canadian geologist Harold Williams in 1964, he included only Precambrian rocks in eastern Newfoundland. More than a decade later he extended the term to include all exotic rocks from Newfoundland down to Rhode Island. Since the introduction of the term terrane in the 1980s, Avalonia has been referred to as "platform", "composite terrane", "superterrane", "East" and "West Avalonia", and "Avalon sensu lato". "Avalonia" can thus refer exclusively to rocks in Newfoundland (Avalonia sensu stricto), an assembly of terranes, or a single tectonic unit.

== Extent ==
The terranes of Avalonia with modern borders for orientation: 1 Laurentia; 2 Baltica; 3 Proto-Tethys Ocean; 4 Western Avalonia; 5 Eastern Avalonia. US: United States; CT: Connecticut; MA: Massachusetts; NH: New Hampshire; ME: Maine; RI: Rhode-Island CA: Canada; NB: New Brunswick; NFL: Newfoundland; NS: Nova-Scotia; PE: Prince Edward Island Europe: IE: Ireland; UK: United Kingdom; FR: France; BE: Belgium; NL: Netherlands; DE: Germany; PL: Poland

Avalonia is the largest of the peri-Gondwanan terranes, a series of continental blocks that more or less simultaneously broke off the northern margin of Gondwana and therefore share an early Paleozoic marine fauna. They migrated northward. Eventually Western Avalonia was accreted to Laurentia (the proto North American tectonic plate) in the Acadian orogeny and Eastern Avalonia was accreted to Baltica (the proto European plate) in the Caledonian orogeny.

In North America Western Avalonia stretches from New England to Atlantic Canada. In Canada, it comprises the Avalon Peninsula of southeast Newfoundland, southern New Brunswick, part of Nova Scotia, and Prince Edward Island. In the United States, it consists of northern coastal Maine, all of Rhode Island, and other sections of coastal New England.

The accretion of East Avalonia to Baltica substantially increased the size of this plate by adding an area which includes most of Poland (only the NE corner of this area was part of Baltica) northern Germany, the Netherlands, Belgium, a strip of northern France, England, Wales and the eastern and southeastern parts of Ireland. Scotland and the northern and western parts of Ireland were part of Laurentia.

The British Isles as we know them now were formed during the Acadian phase of the Caledonian orogeny when the parts which belonged to Laurentia and those which belonged to Avalonia were amalgamated.

The North American terranes of Ganderia and Carolinia are sometimes grouped with Avalonia as "Greater Avalonia" because they migrated across the Iapetus Ocean together . Sometimes the Meguma terrane in Nova Scotia is also included.

Other Peri-Gondwanan terranes include Carolina in the Appalachians and the deep bedrock of Florida in North America, Oaxaquia and Yucatán in Mexico, and the Chortis Block of Honduras and Guatemala.

Part of the British-Belgian section formed an island in the Carboniferous, affecting the disposition of coalfields; this is known by names such as the 'London-Brabant Island'. Its bulk had an effect on the geological structure between the Ardennes and the English Midlands by influencing the subsequent crustal folding resulting from the Variscan collision.

== Development ==
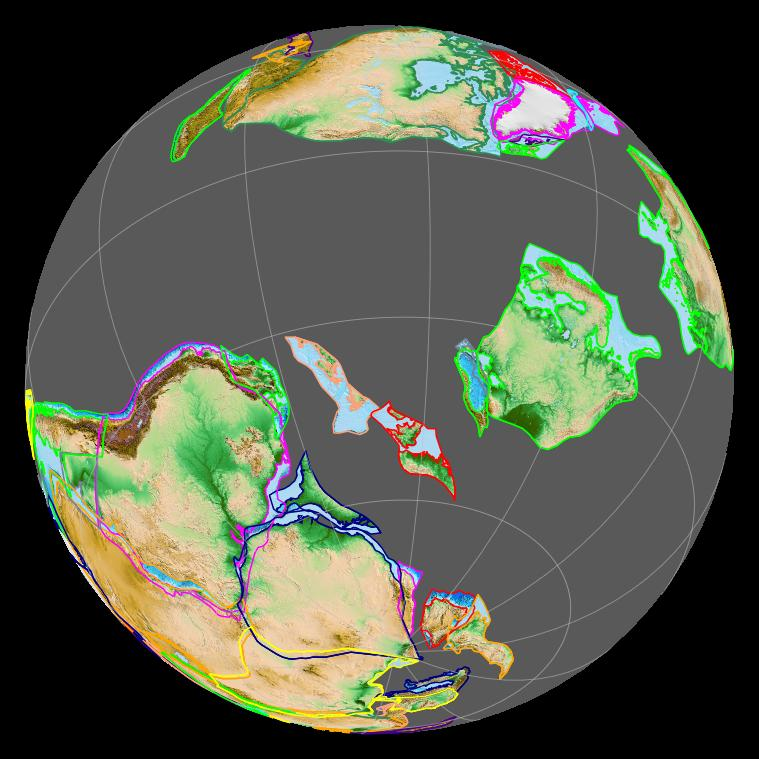
Avalonia on its journey to Baltica at 480 Ma (Early Ordovician)

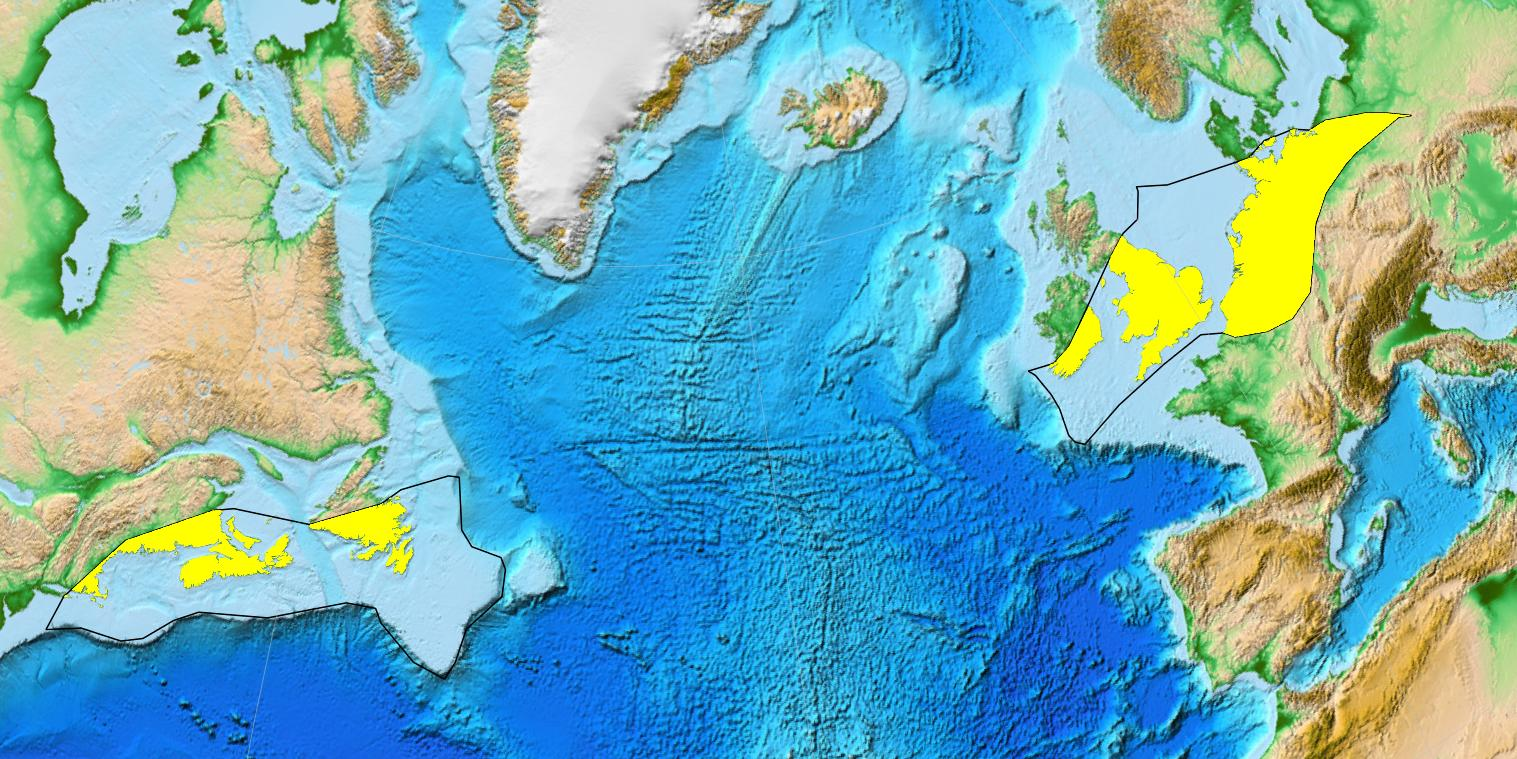
Current location of Avalonia highlighted in yellow

The basement of Avalonia is poorly known, but, based on isotopic analyses, proto-Avalonia most likely evolved together with Carolina about 800 Ma from volcanic arcs far offshore from the supercontinent Rodinia, most likely outboard continental terranes of more obvious West African affinities, such as Cadomia and Iberia. About 650 Ma the Avalonian belt collided with Gondwana.

Avalonia originally developed along the shores of Rodinia together with island arcs now found in the Arabian-Nubian Shield (900–700 Ma) and Tocantins in central Brazil (950–900 Ma) and the basement of Avalonia is most likely of the same age.

During the Precambrian-Cambrian transition, Avalonia was located in a cool-water environment and even underwent a glaciation. The Moroccan Anti-Atlas range in West Gondwana was, in contrast, characterised by evaporites, evidence of desiccation, and had thrombolites. Avalonia and Gondwana must therefore have been located far from each other during this period. The two did, however, share a geological history from later in the early Cambrian until the mid-Ordovician.

Post-orogenic tectonic dynamics during the Cadomian orogeny along the northern margin of Gondwana caused the opening of the Rheic Ocean and the rifting and northward migration of Avalonia in front of it in the Late Cambrian-Early Ordovician. This migration also involved the consumption of the Tornquist Ocean to the north of Avalonia which had opened between Baltica and Gondwana when the former had rifted from the latter and migrated northward earlier. This independent movement of Avalonia started from a latitude of about 60° South.

In the Late Ordovician the Tornquist Ocean was closed by the collision of Eastern Avalonia with Baltica at 30°S, causing the accretion of the former to the latter during the Caledonian orogeny. In Avalonia, folding, faulting, and volcanism followed – as evidenced in the Welsh Borderland and the Taconic deformation in Laurentia – some or all of which are related to the collision. Plinian eruptions resulted from the subduction beneath Avalonia and produced thick layers of K-bentonite in southwestern Baltica, while the Millbrig eruptions occurred in Laurentia. This Late Ordovician magmatism peaked between 457 and 449 Ma.

In the late Silurian- Early Devonian, there was the Acadian orogeny in which Western Avalonia collided with and was accreted to the eastern coast of Laurentia. In the British Isles this orogenic event is regarded as the last phase of the Caledonian orogeny. It involved a soft collision and the amalgamation of the parts of these isles that belonged to Laurentia with those that belonged to Avalonia (see above) to form the British Isles as we know them now.

In the Late Devonian-Carboniferous, another group of peri-Gondwanan terranes, the Armorican Terrane Assemblage drifted from the African part of Gondwana while the latter was converging with Laurussia. These terranes were accreted to Baltica/Avalonia, adding the Iberian Peninsula and lands that now are in southern Germany, the Czech Republic, Austria, Switzerland and France to Europe. This was during the Variscan orogeny which created the European Varicides and was part of the process of amalgamation of Laurussia and Gondwana, which formed Pangaea. This was happening at around the Equator with Avalonia near its centre but partially flooded by shallow sea.

The rifting and opening of the Atlantic Ocean broke up Pangaea. When this rifting propagated to the North Atlantic in the Cretaceous, Laurentia and Eurasia were separated and drifted away from each other. As a result, parts of Avalonia are now on both sides of this ocean.

== See also ==
- Armorican terrane
