= Rheic Ocean =

Ancient ocean which separated two major palaeocontinents, Gondwana and Laurussia

The Rheic Ocean (/ˈreɪɪk/; RAY-ik) was an ocean which separated two major paleocontinents, Gondwana and Laurussia (Laurentia-Baltica-Avalonia). One of the principal oceans of the Paleozoic, its sutures today stretch 10,000 km (6,200 mi) from Mexico to Turkey and its closure resulted in the assembly of the supercontinent Pangaea and the formation of the Variscan–Alleghenian–Ouachita orogenies.

== Etymology ==
The ocean located between Gondwana and Laurentia in the Early Cambrian was named for Iapetus, in Greek mythology the father of Atlas (from which source the Atlantic Ocean ultimately gets its name), just as the Iapetus Ocean was the predecessor of the Atlantic Ocean. The ocean between Gondwana and Laurussia (Laurentia–Baltica–Avalonia) that existed from the Early Ordovician to the Early Carboniferous was named the Rheic Ocean after Rhea, sister of Iapetus.

== Geodynamic evolution ==
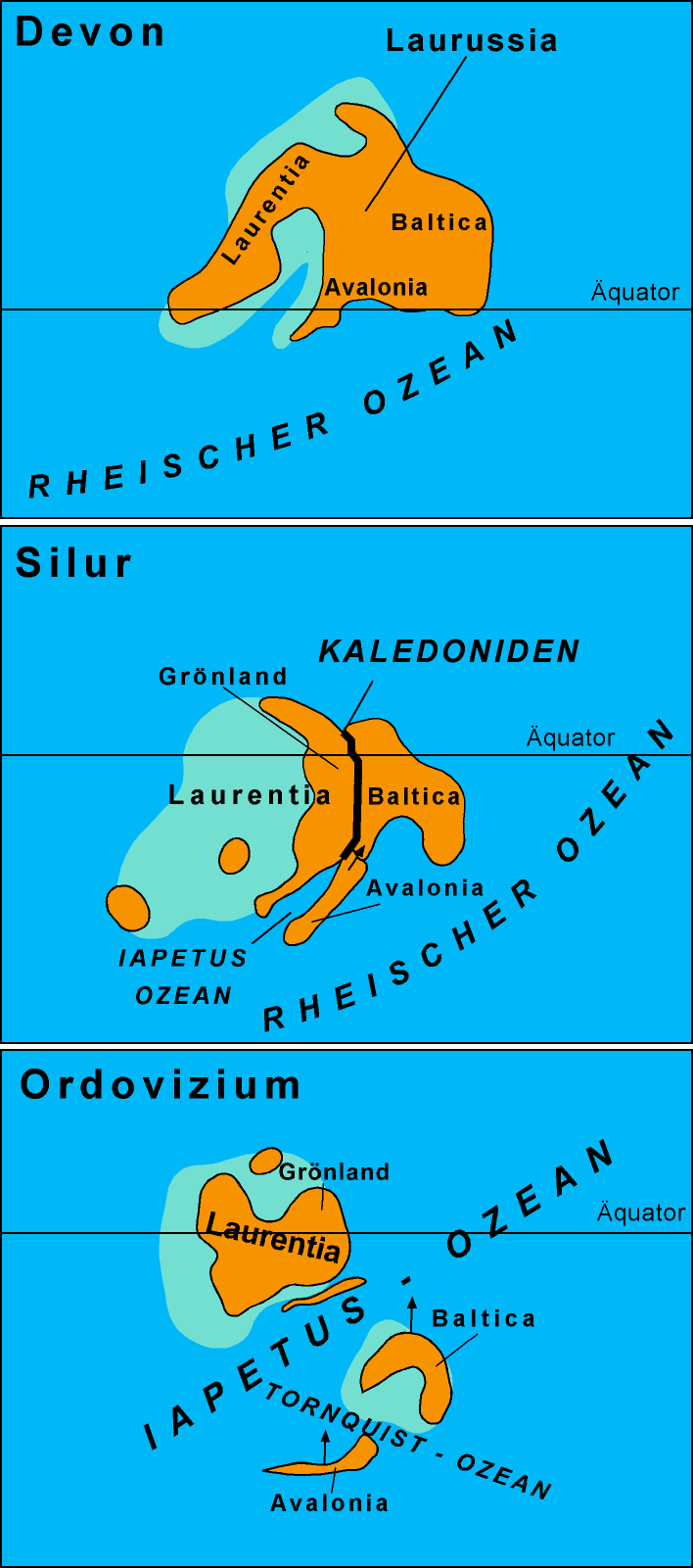
Evolution of the Rheic Ocean in the Early Paleozoic

At the beginning of the Paleozoic Era, about 540 million years ago, most of the continental mass on Earth was clustered around the south pole as the paleocontinent Gondwana. The exception was formed by a number of smaller continents, such as Laurentia and Baltica. The Paleozoic ocean between Gondwana, Laurentia and Baltica is called the Iapetus Ocean. The northern edge of Gondwana had been dominated by the Cadomian orogeny during the Ediacaran period. This orogeny formed a cordillera-type volcanic arc where oceanic crust subducted below Gondwana. When a mid-oceanic ridge subducted at an oblique angle, extensional basins developed along the northern margin of Gondwana. During the late Cambrian to Early Ordovician these extensional basins had evolved a rift running along the northern edge of Gondwana. The rift in its turn evolved into a mid-oceanic ridge that separated small continental fragments such as Avalonia and Carolina from the main Gondwanan land mass, leading to the formation of the Rheic Ocean in the Early Ordovician.

As Avalonia-Carolina drifted north from Gondwana, the Rheic Ocean grew and reached its maximum width (4,000 km (2,500 mi)) in the Silurian. In this process, the Iapetus Ocean closed as Avalonia-Carolina collided with Laurentia and the Appalachian orogeny formed.

The closure of the Rheic began in the Early Devonian and was completed in the Mississippian when Gondwana and Laurentia collided to form Pangaea. This closure resulted in the largest collisional orogen of the Palaeozoic: the Variscan and Alleghanian orogens between Gondwana's West African margin and southern Baltica and eastern Laurentia and the Ouachita orogeny between the Amazonian margin of Gondwana and southern Laurentia.

== Effects on life ==
The Prague Basin, which was an archipelago of humid volcanic islands in the Rheic Ocean on the outer edges of what was then the Gondwanan shelf during the Silurian, was a major hotspot of plant biodiversity during the early stages of the Silurian-Devonian Terrestrial Revolution. The geologically rapid environmental changes associated with the formation and erosion of volcanic islands and high rates of endemism associated with island ecosystems likely played an important role in driving the rapid early diversification of vascular plants.

It is believed that the closure of the Rheic, alongside the simultaneous onset of the Late Palaeozoic Ice Age, may have sparked the Carboniferous-Earliest Permian Biodiversification Event, an evolutionary radiation of marine life dominated by increase in species richness of fusulinids and brachiopods.

== See also ==
- Morais ophiolite complex – Metamorphic complex of oceanic and continental crust terranes in Portugal

== Sources ==
=== Bibliography ===
- Linnemann, U.; Pereira, F.; Jeffries, T. E.; Drost, K.; Gerdes, A. (2008). "The Cadomian Orogeny and the opening of the Rheic Ocean: The diacrony of geotectonic processes constrained by LA-ICP-MS U–Pb zircon dating (Ossa-Morena and Saxo-Thuringian Zones, Iberian and Bohemian Massifs)". Tectonophysics. 461 (1–4): 21–43. Bibcode:2008Tectp.461...21L. doi:10.1016/j.tecto.2008.05.002. hdl:10174/2966.
- Linnemann, U.; Gerdes, A.; Drost, K.; Buschmann, B. (2007). "The continuum between Cadomian Orogenesis and opening of the Rheic Ocean: constraints from LA-ICP-MS U–Pb zircon dating and analysis of plate-tectonic setting (Saxo-Thuringian Zone, NE Bohemian Massif, Germany)" (PDF). In Linnemann, U.; Nance, D.; Kraft, P.; et al. (eds.). The Evolution of the Rheic Ocean: from Avalonian–Cadomian Active Margin to Alleghenian–Variscan Collision. Vol. 423. pp. 61–96. doi:10.1130/2007.2423(03). ISBN 978-0-8137-2423-2. S2CID 131017013.
- Murphy, J. B.; Gutierrez-Alonso, G.; Nance, R. D.; Fernandez-Suarez, J.; Keppie, J. D.; Quesada, C.; Strachan, R. A.; Dostal, J. (2006). "Origin of the Rheic Ocean: Rifting along a Neoproterozoic suture?". Geology. 34 (5): 325–328. Bibcode:2006Geo....34..325B. doi:10.1130/G22068.1. S2CID 128414247.
- Nance, R. D.; Gutiérrez-Alonso, G.; Keppie, J. D.; Linnemann, U.; Murphy, J. B.; Quesada, C.; Strachan, R. A.; Woodcock, N. H. (2010). "Evolution of the Rheic ocean". Gondwana Research. 17 (2): 194–222. Bibcode:2010GondR..17..194N. doi:10.1016/j.gr.2009.08.001.
