= Geological history of Earth =

Geologic time shown in a diagram called a geological clock, showing the relative lengths of the eons of Earth's history and noting major events

The geological history of Earth follows the major geological events in Earth's past based on the geologic time scale, a system of chronological measurement based on the study of the planet's rock layers (stratigraphy). Earth formed approximately 4.54 billion years ago through accretion from the solar nebula, a disk-shaped mass of dust and gas remaining from the formation of the Sun, which also formed the rest of the Solar System.

Initially, Earth was molten due to extreme volcanism and frequent collisions with other bodies. Eventually, the outer layer of the planet cooled to form a solid crust when water began accumulating in the atmosphere. The Moon formed soon afterwards, possibly as a result of the impact of a protoplanet with Earth. Outgassing and volcanic activity produced the primordial atmosphere. Condensing water vapor, augmented by ice delivered from asteroids, produced the oceans. However, in 2020, researchers reported that sufficient water to fill the oceans may have always been on Earth since the beginning of the planet's formation.

As the surface continually reshaped itself over hundreds of millions of years, continents formed and broke apart. They migrated across the surface, occasionally combining to form a supercontinent. Roughly 750 million years ago, the earliest-known supercontinent Rodinia, began to break apart. The continents later recombined to form Pannotia, 600 to 540 million years ago, then finally Pangaea, which broke apart 200 million years ago.

The present pattern of ice ages began about 40 million years ago, then intensified at the end of the Pliocene. The polar regions have since undergone repeated cycles of glaciation and thawing, repeating every 40,000–100,000 years. The Last Glacial Period of the current ice age ended about 10,000 years ago.

Plate tectonics from the Neoproterozoic to present Convergent boundary Divergent boundary Transform boundary Arrows point to the upthrown side Continental crust (older crust) Continental crust (younger crust) Oceanic crust

== Precambrian ==
The Precambrian includes approximately 90% of geologic time. It extends from 4.6 billion years ago to the beginning of the Cambrian Period (about 539 million years ago). It includes the first three of the four eons of Earth's prehistory (the Hadean, Archean, and Proterozoic) and precedes the Phanerozoic eon.

Major volcanic events altering Earth's environment and causing extinctions may have occurred 10 times in the past 3 billion years.

=== Hadean Eon ===
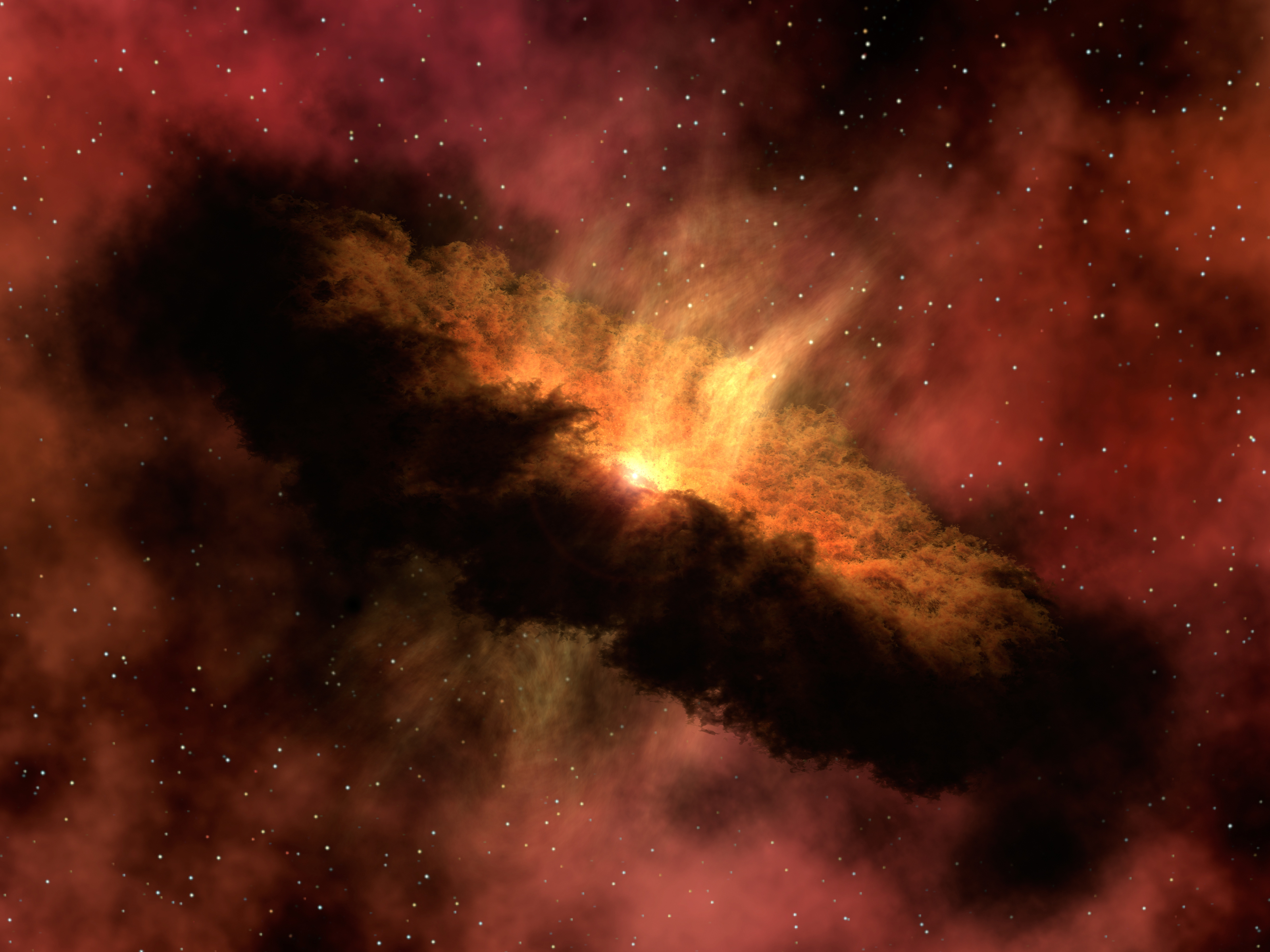
Artist's conception of a protoplanetary disc

During Hadean time (4.6–4 Ga), the Solar System was forming, probably within a large cloud of gas and dust around the Sun, called an accretion disc from which Earth formed 4,500 million years ago. The Hadean Eon is not formally recognized, but it essentially marks the era before we have adequate record of significant solid rocks. The oldest dated zircons date from about 4,400 million years ago.

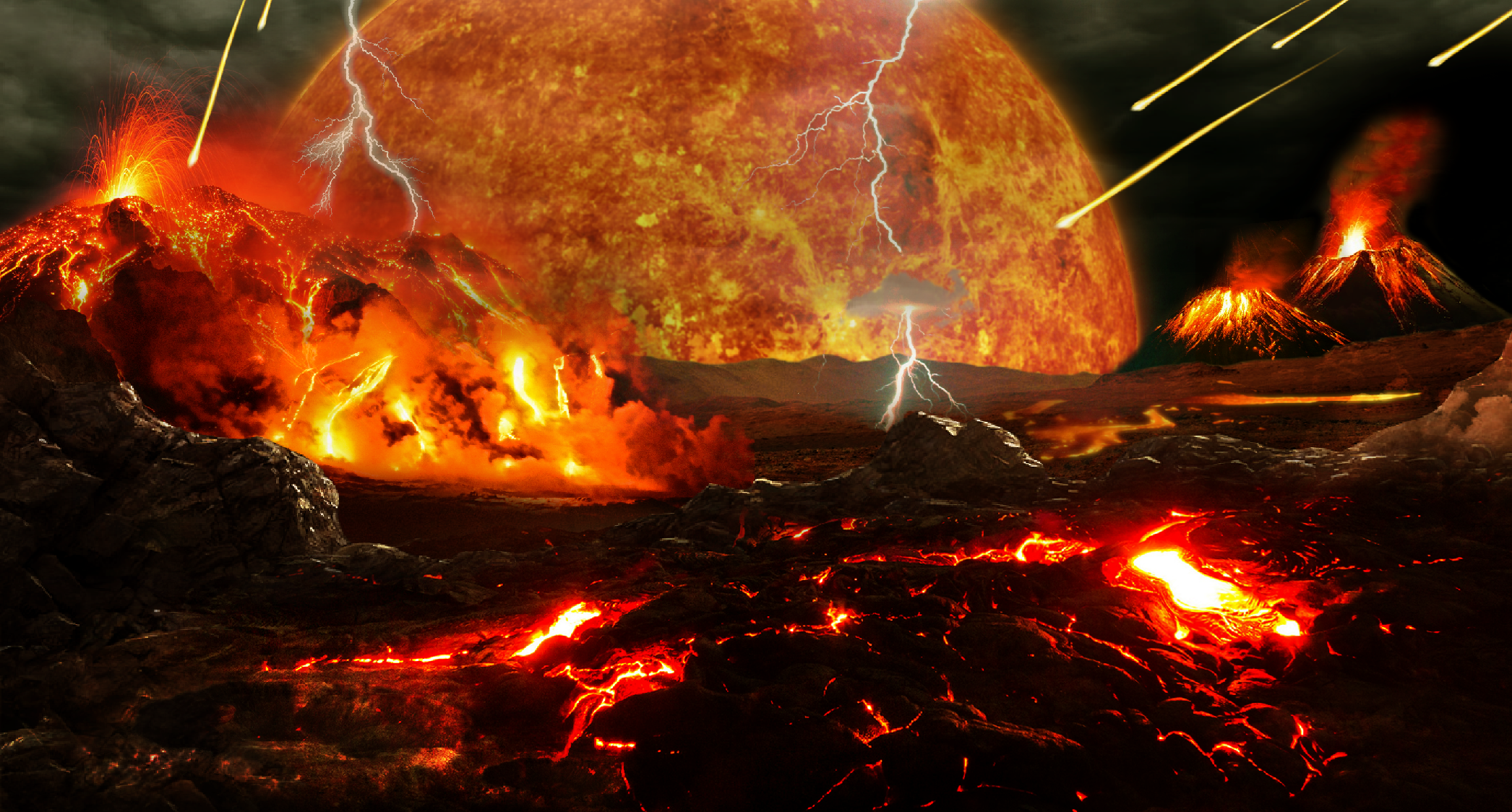
Artist's impression of a Hadean landscape and the Moon looming large in the sky, both bodies still under extreme volcanism.

Earth was initially molten due to extreme volcanism and frequent collisions with other bodies. Eventually, the outer layer of the planet cooled to form a solid crust when water began accumulating in the atmosphere. The Moon formed soon afterwards, possibly as a result of the impact of a large planetoid with Earth. More recent potassium isotopic studies suggest that the Moon was formed by a smaller, high-energy, high-angular-momentum giant impact cleaving off a significant portion of Earth. Some of this object's mass merged with Earth, significantly altering its internal composition, and a portion was ejected into space. Some of the material survived to form the orbiting Moon. Outgassing and volcanic activity produced the primordial atmosphere. Condensing water vapor, augmented by ice delivered from comets, produced the oceans. However, in 2020, researchers reported that sufficient water to fill the oceans may have always been on Earth since the beginning of the planet's formation.

During the Hadean the Late Heavy Bombardment occurred (approximately 4,100 to 3,800 million years ago) during which a large number of impact craters are believed to have formed on the Moon, and by inference on Earth, Mercury, Venus, and Mars as well. However, some scientists argue against this hypothetical Late Heavy Bombardment, pointing out that the conclusion has been drawn from data which are not fully representative (only a few crater hotspots on the Moon have been analyzed).

=== Archean Eon ===
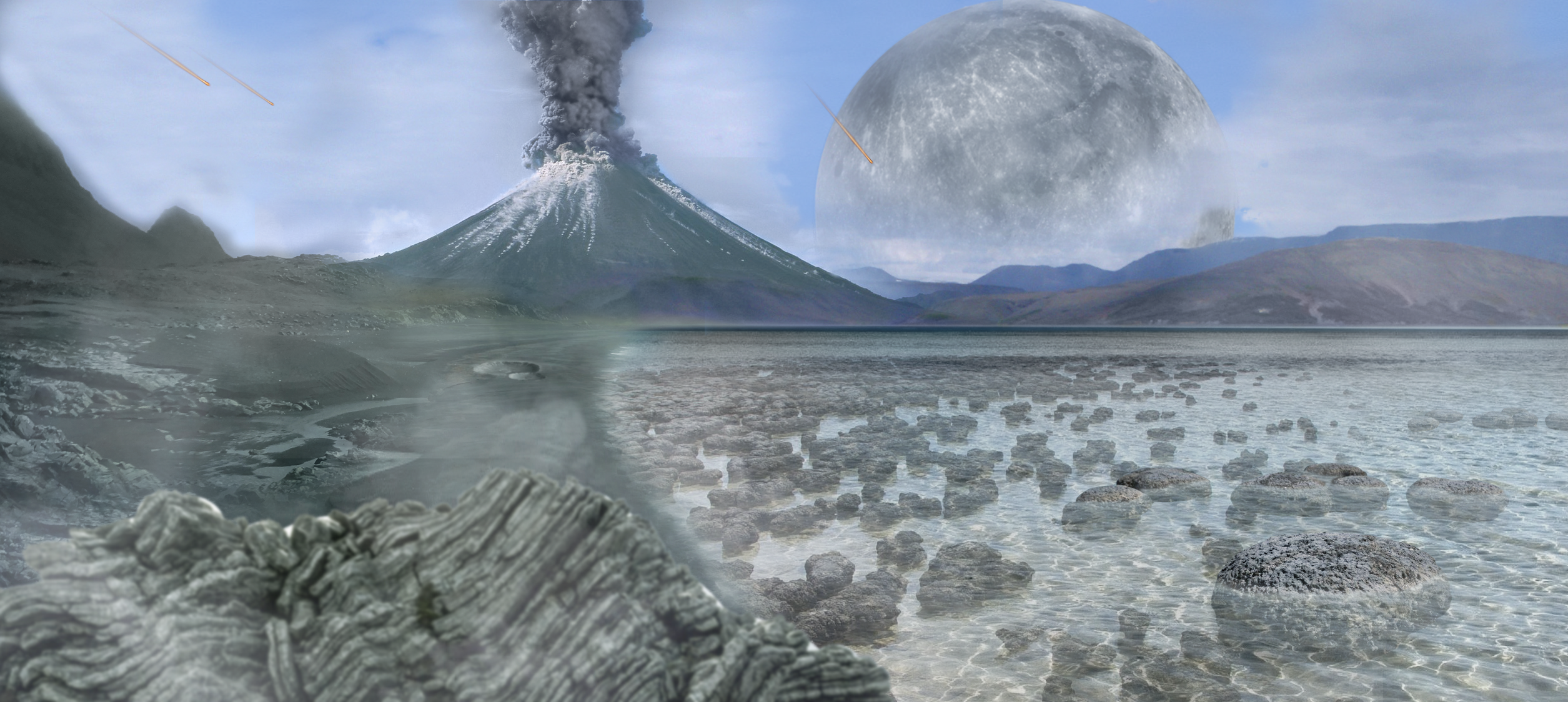
Artist's impression of Earth during its second eon, the Archean. The eon started with the Late Heavy Bombardment around 4.031 billion years ago. As depicted, Earth's planetary crust had largely cooled, leaving a water-rich barren surface marked by volcanoes and continents, eventually developing round microbialites. The Moon orbited Earth much closer, appearing much larger, producing more frequent and wider eclipses as well as tidal effects.

Earth of the early Archean (4,031 to 2,500 million years ago) may have had a different tectonic style. It is widely believed that the early Earth was dominated by vertical tectonic processes, such as stagnant lid, heat-pipe, or sagduction, which eventually transitioned to plate tectonics during the planet's mid-stage evolution. However, an alternative view proposes that Earth never experienced a vertical tectonic phase and that plate tectonics have been active throughout its entire history. During this time, Earth's crust cooled enough that rocks and continental plates began to form. Some scientists think because Earth was hotter in the past, plate tectonic activity was more vigorous than it is today, resulting in a much greater rate of recycling of crustal material. This may have prevented cratonization and continent formation until the mantle cooled and convection slowed down. Others argue that the subcontinental lithospheric mantle is too buoyant to subduct and that the lack of Archean rocks is a function of erosion and subsequent tectonic events. Some geologists view the sudden increase in aluminium content in zircons as an indicator of the beginning of plate tectonics.

Unlike Proterozoic rocks, Archean rocks are distinguished by the presence of heavily metamorphosed deep-water sediments, such as graywackes, mudstones, volcanic sediments and banded iron formations. Greenstone belts are typical Archean formations, consisting of alternating high- and low-grade metamorphic rocks. The high-grade rocks were derived from volcanic island arcs, while the low-grade metamorphic rocks represent deep-sea sediments eroded from the neighboring island rocks and deposited in a forearc basin. In short, greenstone belts represent sutured protocontinents.

The Earth's magnetic field was established 3.5 billion years ago. The solar wind flux was about 100 times the value of the modern Sun, so the presence of the magnetic field helped prevent the planet's atmosphere from being stripped away, which is what probably happened to the atmosphere of Mars. However, the field strength was lower than at present and the magnetosphere was about half the modern radius.

=== Proterozoic Eon ===
The geologic record of the Proterozoic (2,500 to 538.8 million years ago) is more complete than that for the preceding Archean. In contrast to the deep-water deposits of the Archean, the Proterozoic features many strata that were laid down in extensive shallow epicontinental seas; furthermore, many of these rocks are less metamorphosed than Archean-age ones, and plenty are unaltered. Study of these rocks shows that the eon featured massive, rapid continental accretion (unique to the Proterozoic), supercontinent cycles, and wholly modern orogenic activity. Roughly 750 million years ago, the earliest-known supercontinent Rodinia, began to break apart. The continents later recombined to form Pannotia, 600–540 Ma.

The first-known glaciations occurred during the Proterozoic, one that began shortly after the beginning of the eon, while there were at least four during the Neoproterozoic, climaxing with the Snowball Earth of the Varangian glaciation.

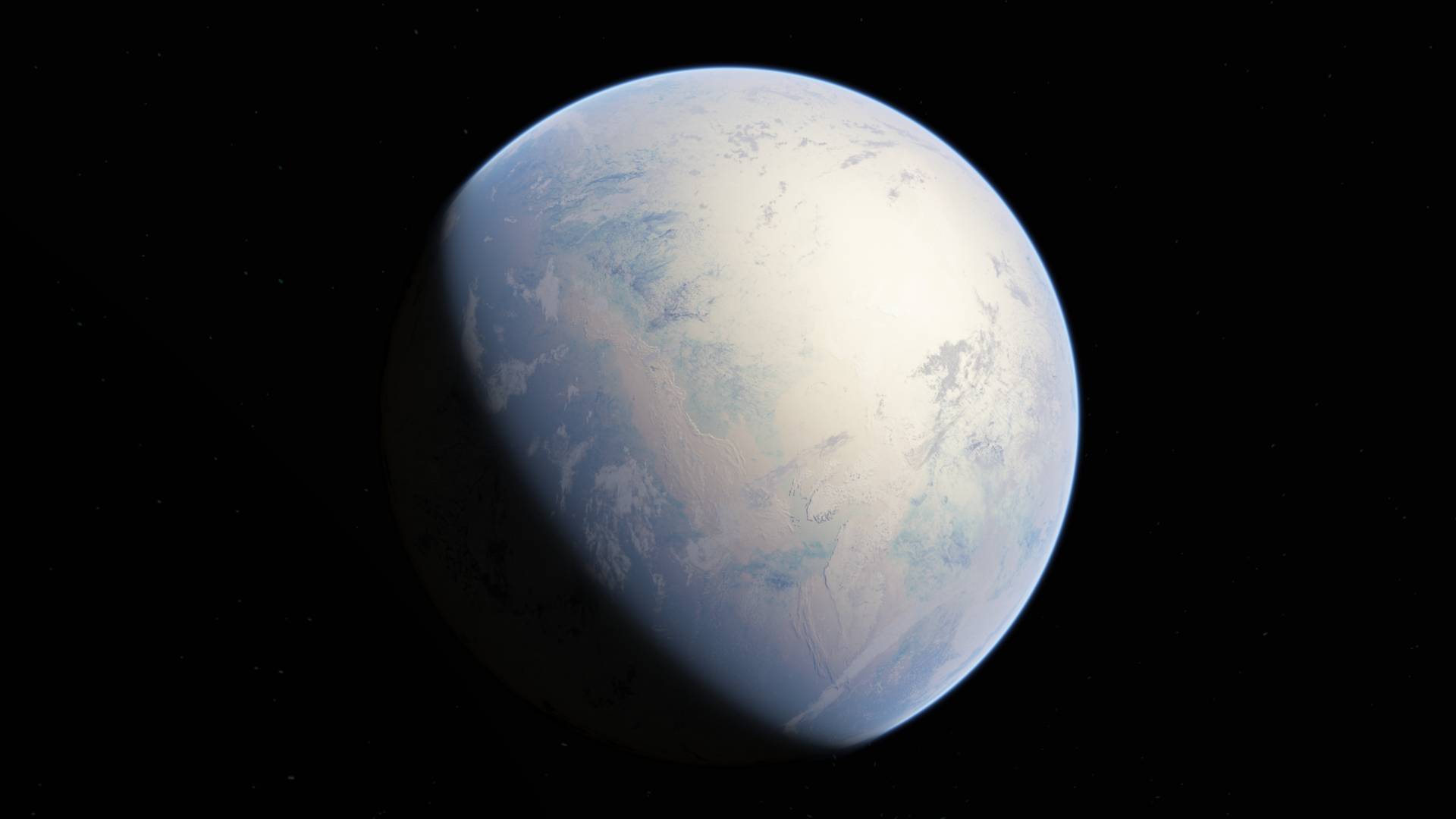
Artist's rendition of a fully-frozen Snowball Earth with no remaining liquid surface water

== Phanerozoic ==
The Phanerozoic is the current eon in the geologic timescale. It covers roughly 539 million years. The Phanerozoic is divided into three eras – the Paleozoic, the Mesozoic and the Cenozoic. During this eon, continents drifted apart but eventually collected into a single landmass known as Pangea before splitting again into the current continental landmasses.

Most of the evolution of multicellular life occurred during this time period.

=== Paleozoic Era ===
The Paleozoic era spanned roughly 539 to 251 million years ago, and is subdivided into six geologic periods: from oldest to youngest, they are the Cambrian, Ordovician, Silurian, Devonian, Carboniferous and Permian. Geologically, the Paleozoic starts shortly after the breakup of a supercontinent called Pannotia and at the end of a global ice age. Throughout the early Paleozoic, Earth's landmass was broken up into a substantial number of relatively small continents. Toward the end of the era, the continents gathered together into a supercontinent called Pangaea, which included most of Earth's land area.

==== Cambrian Period ====
The Cambrian period started about 538.8 ± 0.2 million years ago. Cambrian continents are thought to have resulted from the breakup of a Neoproterozoic supercontinent called Pannotia. The waters of the Cambrian period appear to have been widespread and shallow. Continental drift rates may have been anomalously high. Laurentia, Baltica and Siberia remained independent continents following the break-up of the supercontinent of Pannotia. Gondwana started to drift toward the South Pole. Panthalassa covered most of the southern hemisphere, and minor oceans included the Proto-Tethys Ocean, Iapetus Ocean and Khanty Ocean.

==== Ordovician period ====
The Ordovician period started at a major extinction event called the Cambrian–Ordovician extinction event some time about 485.4 ± 1.9 million years ago. During the Ordovician the southern continents were collected into a single continent called Gondwana. Gondwana started the period in the equatorial latitudes and, as the period progressed, drifted toward the South Pole. Early in the Ordovician the continents Laurentia, Siberia and Baltica were still independent continents (since the break-up of the supercontinent Pannotia earlier), but Baltica began to move toward Laurentia later in the period, causing the Iapetus Ocean to shrink between them. Also, Avalonia broke free from Gondwana and began to head north toward Laurentia. The Rheic Ocean was formed as a result of this. By the end of the period, Gondwana had neared or approached the pole and was largely glaciated.

The Ordovician came to a close in a series of extinction events that, taken together, comprise the second-largest of the five major extinction events in Earth's history in terms of percentage of genera that became extinct. The only larger one was the Permian-Triassic extinction event. The extinctions occurred approximately 447 to 444 million years ago and mark the boundary between the Ordovician and the following Silurian Period.

The most-commonly accepted theory is that these events were triggered by the onset of an ice age, in the Hirnantian faunal stage that ended the long, stable greenhouse conditions typical of the Ordovician. The ice age was probably not as long-lasting as once thought; study of oxygen isotopes in fossil brachiopods shows that it was probably no longer than 0.5 to 1.5 million years. The event was preceded by a fall in atmospheric carbon dioxide (from 7000ppm to 4400ppm) which selectively affected the shallow seas where most organisms lived. As the southern supercontinent Gondwana drifted over the South Pole, ice caps formed on it. Evidence of these ice caps has been detected in Upper Ordovician rock strata of North Africa and then-adjacent northeastern South America, which were south-polar locations at the time.

==== Silurian Period ====
The Silurian started about 443.8 ± 1.5 million years ago. During the Silurian, Gondwana continued a slow southward drift to high southern latitudes, but there is evidence that the Silurian ice caps were less extensive than those of the late Ordovician glaciation. The melting of ice caps and glaciers contributed to a rise in sea levels, recognizable from the fact that Silurian sediments overlie eroded Ordovician sediments, forming an unconformity. Other cratons and continent fragments drifted together near the equator, starting the formation of a second supercontinent known as Euramerica. The vast ocean of Panthalassa covered most of the northern hemisphere. Other minor oceans include Proto-Tethys, Paleo-Tethys, Rheic Ocean, a seaway of Iapetus Ocean (now in between Avalonia and Laurentia), and newly formed Ural Ocean.

==== Devonian Period ====
The Devonian spanned roughly from 419 to 359 million years ago. The period was a time of great tectonic activity, as Laurasia and Gondwana drew closer together. The continent Euramerica (or Laurussia) was created in the early Devonian by the collision of Laurentia and Baltica, which rotated into the natural dry zone along the Tropic of Capricorn. In these near-deserts, the Old Red Sandstone sedimentary beds formed, made red by the oxidized iron (hematite) characteristic of drought conditions. Near the equator Pangaea began to consolidate from the plates containing North America and Europe, further raising the northern Appalachian Mountains and forming the Caledonian Mountains in Great Britain and Scandinavia. The southern continents remained tied together in the supercontinent of Gondwana. The remainder of modern Eurasia lay in the Northern Hemisphere. Sea levels were high worldwide, and much of the land lay submerged under shallow seas. The deep, enormous Panthalassa (the "universal ocean") covered the rest of the planet. Other minor oceans were Paleo-Tethys, Proto-Tethys, Rheic Ocean and Ural Ocean (which was closed during the collision with Siberia and Baltica).

==== Carboniferous Period ====
The Carboniferous extends from about 358.9 ± 0.4 to about 298.9 ± 0.15 million years ago.

A global drop in sea level at the end of the Devonian reversed early in the Carboniferous; this created the widespread epicontinental seas and carbonate deposition of the Mississippian. There was also a drop in south polar temperatures; southern Gondwana was glaciated throughout the period, though it is uncertain if the ice sheets were a holdover from the Devonian or not. These conditions apparently had little effect in the deep tropics, where lush coal swamps flourished within 30 degrees of the northernmost glaciers. A mid-Carboniferous drop in sea-level precipitated a major marine extinction, one that hit crinoids and ammonites especially hard. This sea-level drop and the associated unconformity in North America separate the Mississippian period from the Pennsylvanian period.

The Carboniferous was a time of active mountain building, as the supercontinent Pangea came together. The southern continents remained tied together in the supercontinent Gondwana, which collided with North America-Europe (Laurussia) along the present line of eastern North America. This continental collision resulted in the Hercynian orogeny in Europe, and the Alleghenian orogeny in North America; it also extended the newly uplifted Appalachians southwestward as the Ouachita Mountains. In the same time frame, much of present eastern Eurasian Plate welded itself to Europe along the line of the Ural Mountains. There were two major oceans in the Carboniferous: the Panthalassa and Paleo-Tethys. Other minor oceans were shrinking and eventually closed the Rheic Ocean (closed by the assembly of South and North America), the small, shallow Ural Ocean (which was closed by the collision of Baltica, and Siberia continents, creating the Ural Mountains) and Proto-Tethys Ocean.

Carboniferous rainforest collapse

==== Permian Period ====
The Permian extends from about 298.9 ± 0.15 to 252.17 ± 0.06 million years ago.

During the Permian all Earth's major landmasses, except portions of East Asia, were collected into a single supercontinent known as Pangaea. Pangaea straddled the equator and extended toward the poles, with a corresponding effect on ocean currents in the single great ocean (Panthalassa, the universal sea), and the Paleo-Tethys Ocean, a large ocean that was between Asia and Gondwana. The Cimmeria continent rifted away from Gondwana and drifted north to Laurasia, causing the Paleo-Tethys to shrink. A new ocean was growing on its southern end, the Tethys Ocean, an ocean that would dominate much of the Mesozoic Era. Large continental landmasses create climates with extreme variations of heat and cold ("continental climate") and monsoon conditions with highly seasonal rainfall patterns. Deserts seem to have been widespread on Pangaea.

=== Mesozoic Era ===
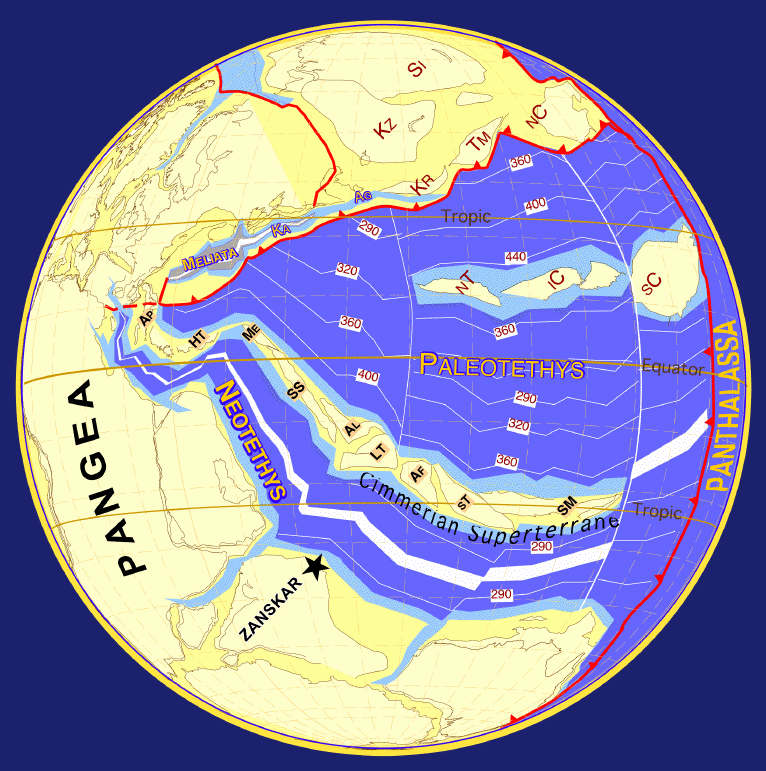
Plate tectonics - 249 million years ago

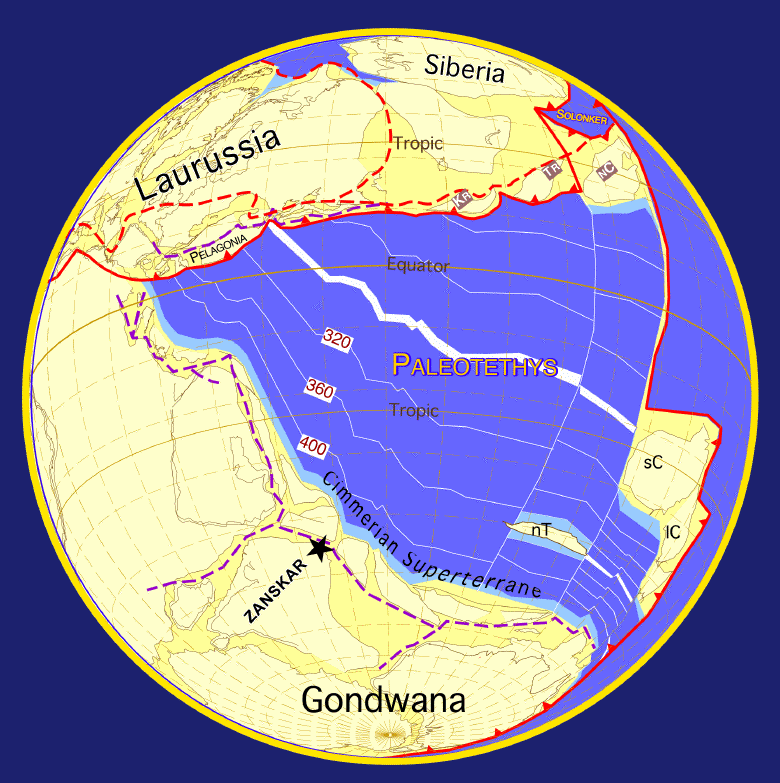
Plate tectonics - 290 million years ago

The Mesozoic extended roughly from 252 to 66 million years ago.

After the vigorous convergent plate mountain-building of the late Paleozoic, Mesozoic tectonic deformation was comparatively mild. Nevertheless, the era featured the dramatic rifting of the supercontinent Pangaea. Pangaea gradually split into a northern continent, Laurasia, and a southern continent, Gondwana. This created the passive continental margin that characterizes most of the Atlantic coastline (such as along the U.S. East Coast) today.

==== Triassic Period ====
The Triassic Period extends from about 252.17 ± 0.06 to 201.3 ± 0.2 million years ago. During the Triassic, almost all Earth's landmass was concentrated into a single supercontinent centered more or less on the equator, called Pangaea ("all the land"). This took the form of a giant "Pac-Man" with an east-facing "mouth" constituting the Tethys sea, a vast gulf that opened farther westward in the mid-Triassic, at the expense of the shrinking Paleo-Tethys Ocean, an ocean that existed during the Paleozoic.

The remainder was the world-ocean known as Panthalassa ("all the sea"). All the deep-ocean sediments laid down during the Triassic have disappeared through subduction of oceanic plates; thus, very little is known of the Triassic open ocean. The supercontinent Pangaea was rifting during the Triassic—especially late in the period—but had not yet separated. The first nonmarine sediments in the rift that marks the initial break-up of Pangea—which separated New Jersey from Morocco—are of Late Triassic age; in the U.S., these thick sediments comprise the Newark Supergroup. Because of the limited shoreline of one super-continental mass, Triassic marine deposits are globally relatively rare; despite their prominence in Western Europe, where the Triassic was first studied. In North America, for example, marine deposits are limited to a few exposures in the west. Thus Triassic stratigraphy is mostly based on organisms living in lagoons and hypersaline environments, such as Estheria crustaceans and terrestrial vertebrates.

==== Jurassic Period ====
The Jurassic Period extends from about 201.3 ± 0.2 to 145.0 million years ago. During the early Jurassic, the supercontinent Pangaea broke up into the northern supercontinent Laurasia and the southern supercontinent Gondwana; the Gulf of Mexico opened in the new rift between North America and what is now Mexico's Yucatan Peninsula. The Jurassic North Atlantic Ocean was relatively narrow, while the South Atlantic did not open until the following Cretaceous Period, when Gondwana itself rifted apart. The Tethys Sea closed, and the Neotethys basin appeared. Climates were warm, with no evidence of glaciation. As in the Triassic, there was apparently no land near either pole, and no extensive ice caps existed. The Jurassic geological record is good in western Europe, where extensive marine sequences indicate a time when much of the continent was submerged under shallow tropical seas; famous locales include the Jurassic Coast World Heritage Site and the renowned late Jurassic lagerstätten of Holzmaden and Solnhofen. In contrast, the North American Jurassic record is the poorest of the Mesozoic, with few outcrops at the surface. Though the epicontinental Sundance Sea left marine deposits in parts of the northern plains of the United States and Canada during the late Jurassic, most exposed sediments from this period are continental, such as the alluvial deposits of the Morrison Formation. The first of several massive batholiths were emplaced in the northern Cordillera beginning in the mid-Jurassic, marking the Nevadan orogeny. Important Jurassic exposures are also found in Russia, India, South America, Japan, Australasia and the United Kingdom.

==== Cretaceous Period ====
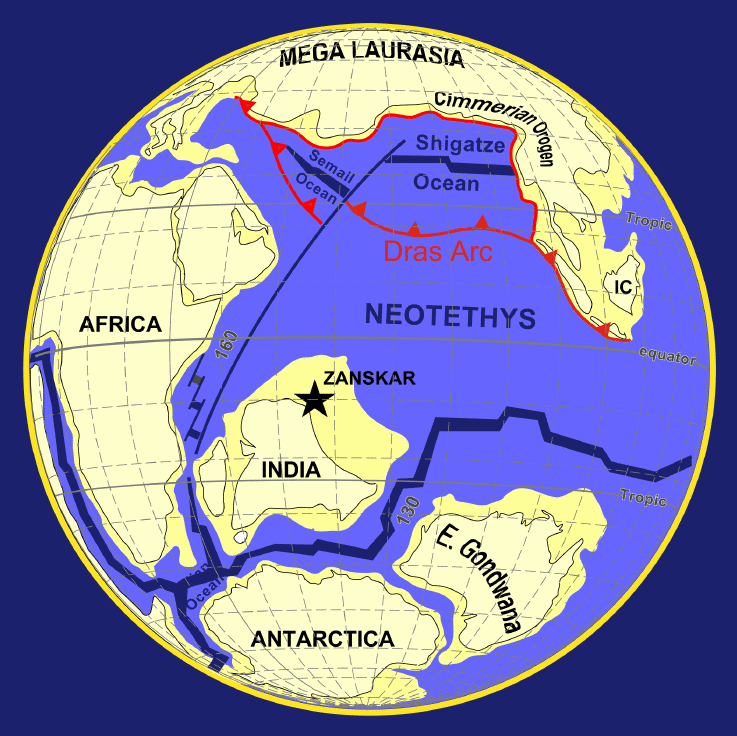
Plate tectonics - 100 Ma, Cretaceous period

The Cretaceous Period extends from circa 145 million years ago to 66 million years ago.

During the Cretaceous, the late Paleozoic-early Mesozoic supercontinent of Pangaea completed its breakup into present day continents, although their positions were substantially different at the time. As the Atlantic Ocean widened, the convergent-margin orogenies that had begun during the Jurassic continued in the North American Cordillera, as the Nevadan orogeny was followed by the Sevier and Laramide orogenies. Though Gondwana was still intact in the beginning of the Cretaceous, Gondwana itself broke up as South America, Antarctica and Australia rifted away from Africa (though India and Madagascar remained attached to each other); thus, the South Atlantic and Indian Oceans were newly formed. Such active rifting lifted great undersea mountain chains along the welts, raising eustatic sea levels worldwide.

To the north of Africa the Tethys Sea continued to narrow. Broad shallow seas advanced across central North America (the Western Interior Seaway) and Europe, then receded late in the period, leaving thick marine deposits sandwiched between coal beds. At the peak of the Cretaceous transgression, one-third of Earth's present land area was submerged. The Cretaceous is justly famous for its chalk; indeed, more chalk formed in the Cretaceous than in any other period in the Phanerozoic. Mid-ocean ridge activity—or rather, the circulation of seawater through the enlarged ridges—enriched the oceans in calcium; this made the oceans more saturated, as well as increased the bioavailability of the element for calcareous nanoplankton. These widespread carbonates and other sedimentary deposits make the Cretaceous rock record especially fine. Famous formations from North America include the rich marine fossils of Kansas's Smoky Hill Chalk Member and the terrestrial fauna of the late Cretaceous Hell Creek Formation. Other important Cretaceous exposures occur in Europe and China. In the area that is now India, massive lava beds called the Deccan Traps were laid down in the very late Cretaceous and early Paleocene.

=== Cenozoic Era ===
The Cenozoic Era covers the 66 million years since the Cretaceous–Paleogene extinction event up to and including the present day. By the end of the Mesozoic era, the continents had rifted into nearly their present form. Laurasia became North America and Eurasia, while Gondwana split into South America, Africa, Australia, Antarctica and the Indian subcontinent, which collided with the Asian plate. This impact gave rise to the Himalayas. The Tethys Sea, which had separated the northern continents from Africa and India, began to close up, forming the Mediterranean Sea.

==== Paleogene Period ====
The Paleogene (alternatively Palaeogene) Period is a unit of geologic time that began 66 and ended 23.03 Ma and comprises the first part of the Cenozoic Era. This period consists of the Paleocene, Eocene and Oligocene Epochs.

===== Paleocene Epoch =====
The Paleocene, lasted from 66 million years ago to 56 million years ago.

In many ways, the Paleocene continued processes that had begun during the late Cretaceous Period. During the Paleocene, the continents continued to drift toward their present positions. Supercontinent Laurasia had not yet separated into three continents. Europe and Greenland were still connected. North America and Asia were still intermittently joined by a land bridge, while Greenland and North America were beginning to separate. The Laramide orogeny of the late Cretaceous continued to uplift the Rocky Mountains in the American west, which ended in the succeeding epoch. South and North America remained separated by equatorial seas (they joined during the Neogene); the components of the former southern supercontinent Gondwana continued to split apart, with Africa, South America, Antarctica and Australia pulling away from each other. Africa was heading north toward Europe, slowly closing the Tethys Ocean, and India began its migration to Asia that would lead to a tectonic collision and the formation of the Himalayas.

===== Eocene Epoch =====
During the Eocene (56 million years ago - 33.9 million years ago), the continents continued to drift toward their present positions. At the beginning of the period, Australia and Antarctica remained connected, and warm equatorial currents mixed with colder Antarctic waters, distributing the heat around the world and keeping global temperatures high. But when Australia split from the southern continent around 45 Ma, the warm equatorial currents were deflected away from Antarctica, and an isolated cold water channel developed between the two continents. The Antarctic region cooled down, and the ocean surrounding Antarctica began to freeze, sending cold water and ice floes north, reinforcing the cooling. The present pattern of ice ages began about 40 million years ago.

The northern supercontinent of Laurasia began to break up, as Europe, Greenland and North America drifted apart. In western North America, mountain building started in the Eocene, and huge lakes formed in the high flat basins among uplifts. In Europe, the Tethys Sea finally vanished, while the uplift of the Alps isolated its final remnant, the Mediterranean, and created another shallow sea with island archipelagos to the north. Though the North Atlantic was opening, a land connection appears to have remained between North America and Europe since the faunas of the two regions are very similar. India continued its journey away from Africa and began its collision with Asia, creating the Himalayan orogeny.

===== Oligocene Epoch =====
The Oligocene Epoch extends from about 34 million years ago to 23 million years ago. During the Oligocene the continents continued to drift toward their present positions.

Antarctica continued to become more isolated and finally developed a permanent ice cap. Mountain building in western North America continued, and the Alps started to rise in Europe as the African Plate continued to push north into the Eurasian Plate, isolating the remnants of Tethys Sea. A brief marine incursion marks the early Oligocene in Europe. There appears to have been a land bridge in the early Oligocene between North America and Europe since the faunas of the two regions are very similar. During the Oligocene, South America was finally detached from Antarctica and drifted north toward North America. It also allowed the Antarctic Circumpolar Current to flow, rapidly cooling the continent.

==== Neogene Period ====
The Neogene Period is a unit of geologic time starting 23.03 Ma. and ends at 2.588 Ma. The Neogene Period follows the Paleogene Period. The Neogene consists of the Miocene and Pliocene and is followed by the Quaternary Period.

===== Miocene Epoch =====
The Miocene extends from about 23.03 to 5.333 million years ago.

During the Miocene continents continued to drift toward their present positions. Of the modern geologic features, only the land bridge between South America and North America was absent, the subduction zone along the Pacific Ocean margin of South America caused the rise of the Andes and the southward extension of the Meso-American peninsula. India continued to collide with Asia. The Tethys Seaway continued to shrink and then disappeared as Africa collided with Eurasia in the Turkish-Arabian region between 19 and 12 Ma (ICS 2004). Subsequent uplift of mountains in the western Mediterranean region and a global fall in sea levels combined to cause a temporary drying up of the Mediterranean Sea resulting in the Messinian salinity crisis near the end of the Miocene.

===== Pliocene Epoch =====
The Pliocene extends from 5.333 million years ago to 2.588 million years ago. During the Pliocene continents continued to drift toward their present positions, moving from positions possibly as far as 250 kilometres (155 mi) from their present locations to positions only 70 km from their current locations.

South America became linked to North America through the Isthmus of Panama during the Pliocene, bringing a nearly complete end to South America's distinctive marsupial faunas. The formation of the Isthmus had major consequences on global temperatures, since warm equatorial ocean currents were cut off and an Atlantic cooling cycle began, with cold Arctic and Antarctic waters dropping temperatures in the now-isolated Atlantic Ocean. Africa's collision with Europe formed the Mediterranean Sea, cutting off the remnants of the Tethys Ocean. Sea level changes exposed the land-bridge between Alaska and Asia. Near the end of the Pliocene, about 2.58 million years ago (the start of the Quaternary Period), the current ice age began. The polar regions have since undergone repeated cycles of glaciation and thaw, repeating every 40,000–100,000 years.

==== Quaternary Period ====
the Quaternary Period is the third, last and current period of the Cenozoic Era. It’s also the last and current period of the Phanerozoic Eon, which marks the present day.

===== Pleistocene Epoch =====
The Pleistocene extends from 2.588 million years ago to 11,700 years before present. The modern continents were essentially at their present positions during the Pleistocene, the plates upon which they sit probably having moved no more than 100 kilometres (62 mi) relative to each other since the beginning of the period.

===== Holocene Epoch =====
Current Earth - without water, elevation greatly exaggerated (click/enlarge to "spin" 3D-globe).

The Holocene Epoch began approximately 11,700 calendar years before present and continues to the present. During the Holocene, continental motions have been less than a kilometer.

The last glacial period of the current ice age ended about 10,000 years ago. Ice melt caused world sea levels to rise about 35 metres (115 ft) in the early part of the Holocene. In addition, many areas above about 40 degrees north latitude had been depressed by the weight of the Pleistocene glaciers and rose as much as 180 metres (591 ft) over the late Pleistocene and Holocene, and are still rising today. The sea level rise and temporary land depression allowed temporary marine incursions into areas that are now far from the sea. Holocene marine fossils are known from Vermont, Quebec, Ontario and Michigan. Other than higher latitude temporary marine incursions associated with glacial depression, Holocene fossils are found primarily in lakebed, floodplain and cave deposits. Holocene marine deposits along low-latitude coastlines are rare because the rise in sea levels during the period exceeds any likely upthrusting of non-glacial origin. Post-glacial rebound in Scandinavia resulted in the emergence of coastal areas around the Baltic Sea, including much of Finland. The region continues to rise, still causing weak earthquakes across Northern Europe. The equivalent event in North America was the rebound of Hudson Bay, as it shrank from its larger, immediate post-glacial Tyrrell Sea phase, to near its present boundaries.

== See also ==
- Astronomical chronology
  - Age of Earth
  - Age of the universe
- Chronological dating, archaeological chronology
  - Absolute dating
  - Relative dating
  - Phase (archaeology)
  - Archaeological association
- Geochronology
  - Future of Earth
  - Geologic time scale
  - Plate reconstruction
  - Plate tectonics
  - Thermochronology
  - Timeline of natural history
  - List of geochronologic names
- General
  - Consilience, evidence from independent, unrelated sources can "converge" on strong conclusions
