= List of ancient oceans =

List of Earth's former oceans

This is a list of former oceans that disappeared due to tectonic movements and other geographical and climatic changes. In alphabetic order:

== List ==
- Adamastor Ocean, Neoproterozoic, separating the Rio de la Plata Craton and the Congo Craton during the break-up of Rodinia, closing when the Rio de la Plata Craton collided with the Kalahari Craton and the São Francisco Craton
- Bridge River Ocean, the ocean between the ancient Insular Islands (that is, Stikinia) and North America
- Cache Creek Ocean, a Paleozoic ocean between the Wrangellia Superterrane and Yukon-Tanana Terrane
- Iapetus Ocean, the Southern Hemisphere ocean between Baltica and Avalonia
- Kahiltna-Nutotzin Ocean, Mesozoic
- Khanty Ocean, the Precambrian to Silurian ocean between Baltica and the Siberian continent
- Medicine Hat Ocean, a small Proterozoic ocean basin
- Meliata Ocean, a small back-arc basin in the Mesozoic to the east of Adria
- Mezcalera Ocean, the ocean between the Guerrero Terrane and Laurentia
- Mirovia, the ocean that surrounded the Rodinia supercontinent
- Mongol-Okhotsk Ocean, the early Mesozoic ocean between the North China and Siberia cratons
- Oimyakon Ocean, the northernmost part of the Mesozoic Panthalassa Ocean
- Paleo-Tethys Ocean, the ocean between Gondwana and the Hunic terranes
- Pan-African Ocean, the ocean that surrounded the Pannotia supercontinent
- Panthalassa, the vast world ocean that surrounded the Pangaea supercontinent, also referred to as the Paleo-Pacific Ocean
- Pharusian Ocean, Neoproterozoic
- Poseidon Ocean, Mesoproterozoic
- Pontus Ocean, the western part of the early Mesozoic Panthalassa Ocean
- Proto-Tethys Ocean, Neoproterozoic
- Rheic Ocean, the Paleozoic ocean between Gondwana and Laurussia
- Slide Mountain Ocean, the Mesozoic ocean between the ancient Intermontane Islands (that is, Wrangellia) and North America
- South Anuyi Ocean, Mesozoic ocean related to the formation of the Arctic Ocean
- Tethys Ocean, the ocean between the ancient continents of Gondwana and Laurasia
- Thalassa Ocean, the eastern part of the early Mesozoic Panthalassa Ocean
- Ural Ocean, the Paleozoic ocean between Siberia and Baltica

== See also ==
- Category:Historical oceans
- List of oceans – Limits of Earth's oceanic waters
- Paleocontinent – Major landmass in the geological past
- Paratethys – Prehistoric shallow inland sea in Eurasia
- Piemont-Liguria Ocean – Former piece of oceanic crust that is seen as part of the Tethys Ocean
- Superocean – Ocean that surrounds a supercontinent, an ocean that surrounds a global supercontinent
- Valais Ocean – Subducted ocean basin. Remnants found in the Alps in the North Penninic nappes.
