= Khanty Ocean =

Small Precambrian ocean between Baltica and the Siberian continent

Khanty Ocean or Khanty-Mansi Ocean was a small ocean located between Baltica and an island arc (the Kipchak Arc) near Siberia, from near the end of the Precambrian time to the Silurian. The ocean is named after two indigenous peoples in Siberia (Khanty and Mansi).

The Khanty Ocean was bordered by a series of oceans: Panthalassa to the north, Proto-Tethys to the northeast, and Paleo-Tethys to the south and east. The ocean formed when the landmass of Proto-Laurasia (shortly after the break-up of Pannotia, about 600 mya) rifted and created three separated continents – Laurentia, Baltica, and Siberia. Khanty's sister ocean, the Iapetus Ocean also formed, between Laurentia and Baltica. The Khanty Ocean closed when an island arc called the Sakmarian Arc collided with Baltica. At the northeastern end of the arc was a new ocean, the Ural Ocean.

== See also ==
- List of ancient oceans – List of Earth's former oceans
- Rheic Ocean – Ancient ocean which separated two major palaeocontinents, Gondwana and Laurussia
