= Khanty (disambiguation) =

The Khanty are an indigenous people living in Khanty-Mansi Autonomous Okrug, Russia.

Khanty may also refer to:

- Khanty language, the language of the Khanty peoples
- Khanty Ocean, an ancient, small ocean that existed near the end of the Precambrian time to the Silurian

== See also ==
- Khanty–Mansi Autonomous Okrug, a federal subject of Russia
- Khanty-Mansiysk, an oil boom town and the administrative center of Khanty-Mansi Autonomous Okrug
- Ostyak, name formerly used to refer to several peoples, including the Khanty people
