= Mongol-Okhotsk Ocean =

Ancient ocean, present during the Mesozoic

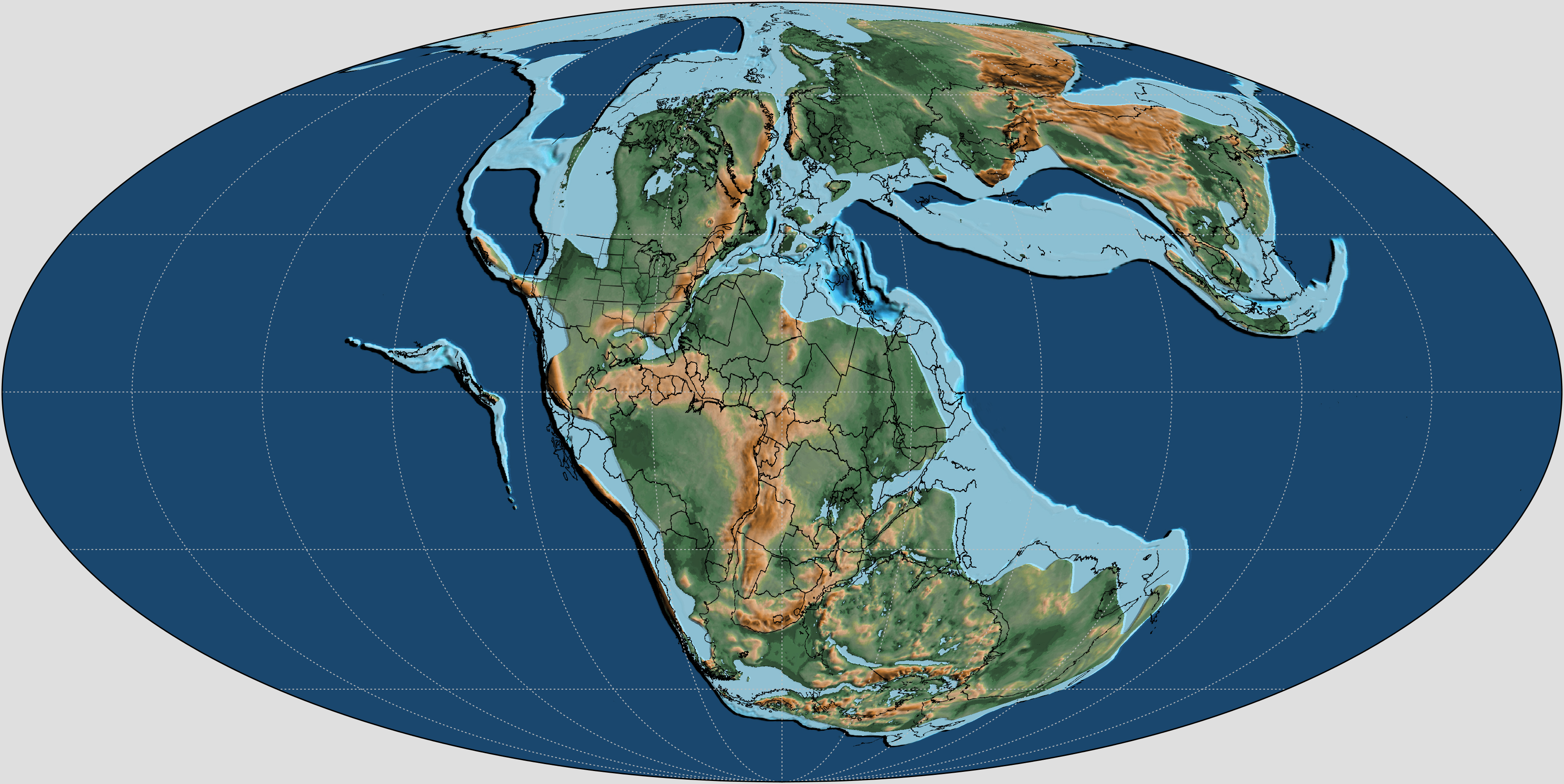
Map of the world during the Early Jurassic c. 200 mya, showing the Mongol-Okhotsk Ocean in the top right

The Mongol-Okhotsk Ocean, also known as the Khangai-Khantey Ocean, was a triangle-shaped ancient ocean present from the Paleozoic to the Mesozoic, whose oceanic floor rocks are preserved in the Mongol-Okhotsk suture zone extending through Mongolia to the Sea of Okhotsk. The ancient ocean began opening during the Early-Middle Paleozoic within the accretionary collage of the Central Asian Orogenic Belt, and gradually started closing from west to east starting in the Late Triassic with a bending of the Western Mongolian Blocks and the formation of the Tuva-Mongol Orocline, and eventually a rapid scissor-like closure resulting in the collision between the Erguna Block and the Siberian Craton during the Late Jurassic and Early Cretaceous.

== Sequence of events ==
With the formation of the supercontinent Pangea in the mid- to late-Paleozoic, the vast Panthalassa ocean dominated 70 percent of the Earth's surface. The Tethys, Mongol-Okhotsk and various small domains of early Pacific Ocean crust constituted other small oceans. Paleomagnetic data collected between 1987 and 2010 suggest that the Mongol-Okhotsk oceanic crust subducted under the terranes of Mongolia in the Late Jurassic or Early Cretaceous.

During the early Mesozoic, the Solonker Ocean, also known as the Intra-Asian Ocean closed bringing together two large continental blocks: Amuria and the North China Block. Amuria then collided with the Siberian Craton, preserving the Mongol-Okhotsk suture zone. Geologists debate why the suture zone ends abruptly near Kazakhstan and have used seismic tomography to develop different interpretations.

Most exposed rocks in the suture zone are thrusted accretionary wedges, often with ophiolites. Uranium-lead dating of basalt, dolerite gabbro as well as Silurian radiolarite gives ages constraints on the formation of the oceanic crust. Dated rocks in the Adaatsag ophiolite in the east are among the oldest at 325 million years old.

== See also ==
- List of ancient oceans
