= Geology of Abkhazia =

The geology of Abkhazia includes Neogene molasse deposits, which are common along the coast. Paleogene greywacke and siltstone rocks form a belt inshore extending into Georgia, while much of the northern and central areas of the country are underlain by Cretaceous and Jurassic rocks. The entire country is underlain by the suture left by the closure of the Paleotethys Ocean. The region exhibits asymmetric, isoclinal folding.
