= South Anuyi Ocean =

Hypothesized ancient ocean

The South Anuyi Ocean or Angayucham Ocean is a hypothesized ancient ocean, interpreted from the South Anuyi suture zone in eastern Siberia.

== Development of the concept ==
Mapping of the northeastern continental shelf of Russia throughout the early 1980s culminated in a report on the "Geological Structure of the USSR: Seas of the Soviet Arctic." Most researchers interpreted the entire shelf as a single continental margin plate.

In 1988 an alternate hypothesis interpreted the rocks of the South Anuyi suture as the remnants of an ancient ocean basin. According to this model, Wrangel, De Long and the New Siberian Islands and the parts of the Chukchi microcontinent were part of a small continent, Arctica. They subsequently broke off and approached Siberia during the Albian.

== See also ==
- Wrangellia
- List of ancient oceans
