= Geology of South Ossetia =

The geology of South Ossetia is underlain by the suture left by the closing of the Paleotethys Ocean. Jurassic age slate and limestone are predominant in the southwest, while much of the north has Cretaceous clastic limestone, greywacke and siltstone flysch rocks. Overthrust nappes and faults are common in the center of the region.
