= Medicine Hat Ocean =

Proterozoic ocean

The Medicine Hat Ocean is an inferred small ocean basin that closed in the Proterozoic as the Hearne craton and Wyoming craton collided.

== See also ==
- List of ancient oceans
- Geology of Wyoming
- Geology of Montana
