= Tethyan Trench =

Ancient oceanic trench

The Tethys Trench was an ancient oceanic trench that existed in the northern part of the Tethys Ocean during the middle Mesozoic to early Cenozoic eras.

== Geology ==
The Tethys Trench formed when the Cimmerian Plate was subducting under eastern Laurasia, around 200 million years ago, in the Early Jurassic. The Tethys Trench extended at its greatest during Late Cretaceous to Paleocene, from what is now Greece to the Western Pacific Ocean. Subduction at the Tethys Trench probably caused the continents Africa and India to move towards Eurasia, which resulted in the opening of the Indian Ocean. When the Arabian Plate and Indian Plate collided with Eurasia, the Tethys Ocean and the trench closed. Remnants of the Tethys Trench can still be found today in Southeastern Europe and southwest of Southeast Asia.

== See also ==
- Geology of the Himalaya
- Oceanic trench
