= Mezcalera Ocean =

Ancient ocean preserved n rocks in Western Mexico

The Mezcalera Ocean is an inferred ancient ocean preserved in rocks in western Mexico. The Mezcalera oceanic plate was likely subducted and consumed into the mantle allowing the Guerrero Terrane to be accreted to western Mexico in the Early Cretaceous.

Speculative reconstructions suggest that the Mezcalera plate experienced slab rollback in the east along the Mexican Craton and simultaneously subducted in the west beneath the Guerrero Terrane.

== See also ==
- List of ancient oceans
