= Ural Ocean =

Small, ancient ocean between Siberia and Baltica

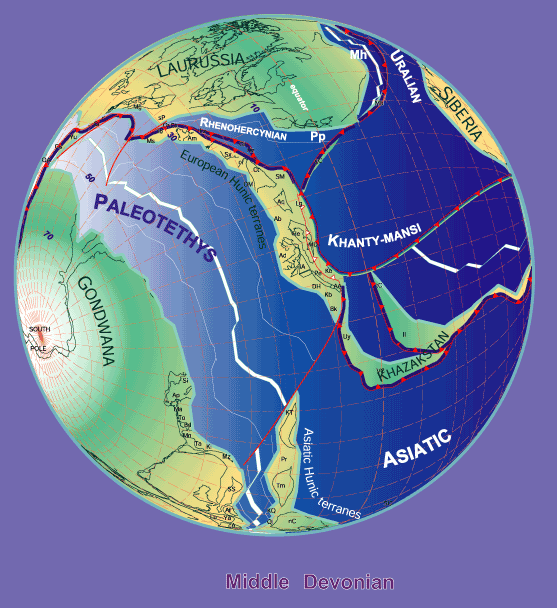
A plate tectonic reconstruction map depicting the Ural Ocean during the Middle Devonian, approximately 380 million years ago

The Ural Ocean (also called the Uralic Ocean) was a small, ancient ocean that was situated between Siberia and Baltica. The ocean formed in the Late Ordovician epoch, when large islands from Siberia collided with Baltica, which was then part of the landmass Euramerica. The islands also caused Ural Ocean's precursor, Khanty Ocean to close. By the Devonian Period, however, the Ural Ocean began to shrink because the Siberian continent and the Kazakhstania microcontinent were approaching Baltica. In the latest part of the Devonian period and in the Mississippian subperiod of the Carboniferous period, the Ural Ocean became a seaway. The three landmasses collided later in the Carboniferous, completely closing the ocean, creating the Ural Mountains, and forming the Pangaea supercontinent.

== See also ==
- List of ancient oceans – List of Earth's former oceans
- Uralian orogeny – Geological events that formed the Ural Mountains
