= Tethys Ocean =

Prehistoric ocean between Gondwana and Laurasia

Paleomap showing the first phase of the Tethys Ocean's forming: the (first) Tethys Sea starts dividing Pangaea into two supercontinents, Laurasia and Gondwana.

The Tethys Ocean (/ˈtiːθɪs, ˈtɛ-/ TEETH-iss, TETH-; Greek: Τηθύς Tēthús), also called the Tethys Sea or the Neo-Tethys, was a prehistoric ocean during much of the Mesozoic Era and early-mid Cenozoic Era. It was the predecessor to the modern Indian Ocean, the Mediterranean Sea, and the Eurasian inland marine basins (primarily represented today by the Black Sea and Caspian Sea).

During the early Mesozoic, as Pangaea broke up, the designation "Tethys Ocean" refers to the ocean located between the ancient continents of Gondwana and Laurasia. After the opening of the Indian and Atlantic oceans during the Cretaceous Period and the breakup of these continents over the same period, it refers to the ocean bordered by the continents of Africa, Eurasia, India, and Australasia. During the early-mid Cenozoic, the Indian, African, Australian, and Arabian plates moved north and collided with the Eurasian plate, which created new borders to the ocean, a land barrier to the flow of currents between the Indian and Mediterranean basins, and the orogenies of the Alpide belt (including the Alps, Himalayas, Zagros, and Caucasus Mountains). All of these geological events, in addition to a drop in sea level from Antarctic glaciation, brought an end to the Tethys as it previously existed, fragmenting it into the Indian Ocean, the Mediterranean Sea, and the Paratethys.

It was preceded by the Paleo-Tethys Ocean, which lasted between the Cambrian and the Early Triassic, while the Neotethys formed during the Late Triassic and lasted in some form up to the Oligocene–Miocene boundary (about 24–21 million years ago) when it completely closed. A portion known as the Paratethys was isolated during the Oligocene (34 million years ago) and lasted up to the Pliocene (about 5 million years ago), when it largely dried out. The modern inland seas of Europe and Western Asia, namely the Black Sea and Caspian Sea, are remnants of the Paratethys Sea.

== Etymology ==
The sea is named after Tethys, who, in ancient Greek mythology, is a water goddess, a sister and consort of Oceanus, mother of the Oceanid sea nymphs and of the world's great rivers, lakes and fountains.

== Terminology and subdivisions ==
The eastern part of the Tethys Ocean is sometimes referred to as Eastern Tethys. The western part of the Tethys Ocean is called Tethys Sea, Western Tethys Ocean, or Paratethys or Alpine Tethys Ocean. The Black, Caspian, and Aral seas are thought to be its crustal remains, though the Black Sea may, in fact, be a remnant of the older Paleo-Tethys Ocean. The Western Tethys was not simply a single open ocean. It covered many small plates, Cretaceous island arcs, and microcontinents. Many small oceanic basins (Valais Ocean, Piemont-Liguria Ocean, Meliata Ocean) were separated from each other by continental terranes on the Alboran, Iberian, and Apulian plates. The high sea level in the Mesozoic flooded most of these continental domains, forming shallow seas.

During the early Cenozoic, the Tethys Ocean could be divided into three sections: the Mediterranean Tethys (the direct predecessor to the Mediterranean Sea), the Peri-Tethys (a vast inland sea that covered much of eastern Europe and central Asia, and the direct predecessor to the Paratethys Sea), and the Indian Tethys (the direct predecessor to the Indian Ocean). The Turgai Strait extended out of the Peri-Tethys, connecting the Tethys with the Arctic Ocean.

As theories have improved, scientists have extended the "Tethys" name to refer to three similar oceans that preceded it, separating the continental terranes: in Asia, the Paleo-Tethys (Devonian–Triassic), Meso-Tethys (late Early Permian–Late Cretaceous), and Ceno-Tethys (Late-Triassic–Cenozoic) are recognized. None of the Tethys oceans should be confused with the Rheic Ocean, which existed to the west of them in the Silurian Period. To the north of the Tethys, the then-land mass is called Angaraland and to the south of it, it is called Gondwanaland.

== Modern theory ==
From the Ediacaran (600 Mya) into the Devonian (360 Mya), the Proto-Tethys Ocean existed and was situated between Baltica and Laurentia to the north and Gondwana to the south.

From the Silurian (440 Mya) through the Jurassic periods, the Paleo-Tethys Ocean existed between the Hunic terranes and Gondwana. Over a period of 400 million years, continental terranes intermittently separated from Gondwana in the Southern Hemisphere to migrate northward to form Asia in the Northern Hemisphere.

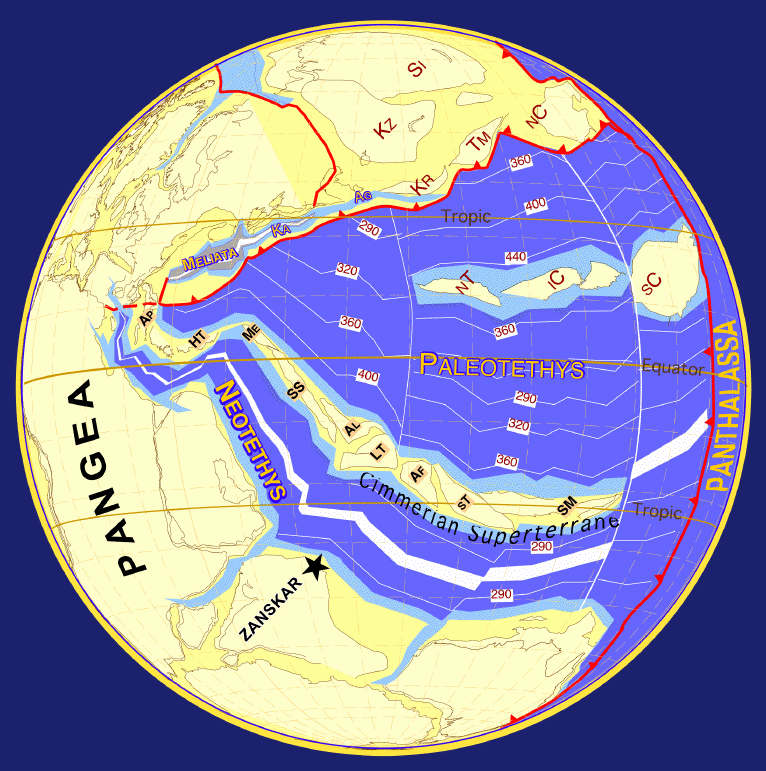
Plate tectonic reconstruction of the Tethys realm at 249 Mya

=== Triassic Period ===
About 250 Mya, during the Triassic, a new ocean began forming in the southern end of the Paleo-Tethys Ocean. A rift formed along the northern continental shelf of Southern Pangaea (Gondwana). Over the next 60 million years, that piece of shelf, known as Cimmeria, traveled north, pushing the floor of the Paleo-Tethys Ocean under the eastern end of northern Pangaea (early / proto- Laurasia). The Neo-Tethys Ocean formed between Cimmeria and Gondwana, directly over where the Paleo-Tethys formerly rested.

=== Jurassic Period ===
During the Jurassic period about 150 Mya, Cimmeria finally collided with Laurasia and stalled, so the ocean floor behind it buckled under, forming the Tethys Trench. Water levels rose, and the western Tethys shallowly covered significant portions of Europe, forming the first Tethys Sea. Around the same time, Laurasia and Gondwana began drifting apart, opening an extension of the Tethys Sea between them, which today is the part of the Atlantic Ocean between the Mediterranean and the Caribbean. As North and South America were still attached to the rest of Laurasia and Gondwana, respectively, the Tethys Ocean in its widest extension was part of a continuous oceanic belt running around the Earth between about latitude 30°N and the Equator. Thus, ocean currents at the time around the Early Cretaceous ran very differently from the way they do today.

=== Late Cretaceous ===
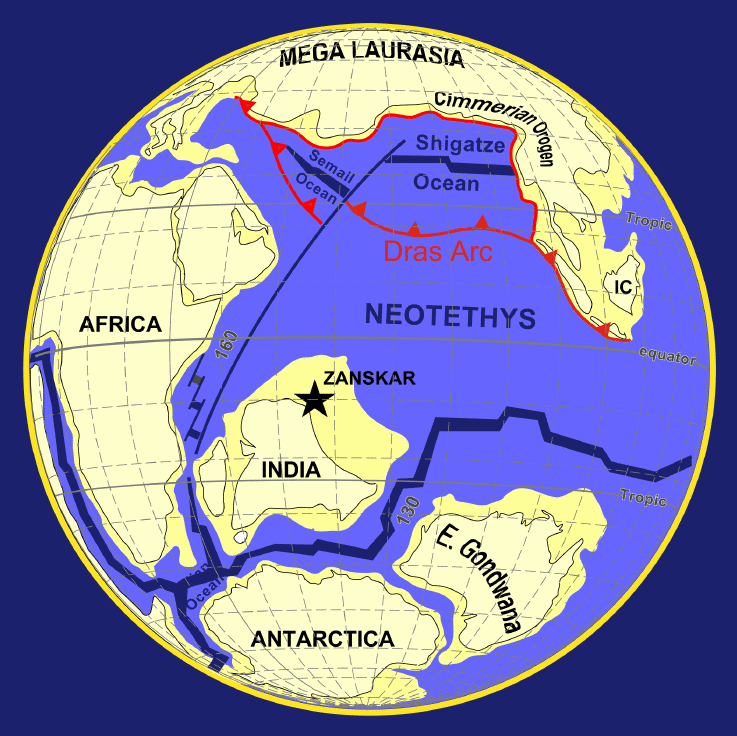
Plate tectonic reconstruction of the Tethys realm at 100 Mya

Between the Jurassic and the Late Cretaceous, which started about 100 Mya, Gondwana began breaking up, pushing Africa and India north across the Tethys and opening up the Indian Ocean. During the Late Cretaceous, the Tethys Sea was home to many different animals, including marine reptiles, bony fish, cartilaginous fish, and cephalopods. The islands that were located in the northern parts of the Tethys Sea (Europe) created biodiverse ecosystems that had animals that went through insular dwarfism and insular gigantism. The insular dwarfism process happened mostly to the dinosaurs that lived on the islands, like the sauropods and the hadrosaurs. Telmatosaurus is a good representation of the insular dwarfism process. While the insular dwarfism process happened to the dinosaurs, the pterosaurs that lived on the islands went through the process known as insular gigantism. Hatzegopteryx was a huge azhdarchid pterosaur that lived on the islands of the Tethys Sea. This giant pterosaur would have filled its ecological niche as an apex predator. During the Maastrichtian, the Tethys Sea had many different large mosasaurs that lived in the same geographical area and would have competed with each other. Europe had large mosasaurs like Prognathodon giganteus, P. saturator, P. sectorius, Mosasaurus hoffmannii, and M. lemonnieri. North Africa would have also had large mosasaurs like Prognathodon giganteus, P. currii, Thalassotitan atrox, and Mosasaurus beaugei. The competition between many different apex predators is something we don't only see in the Tethys Sea, but also in the Western Interior Seaway.

=== Cenozoic ===
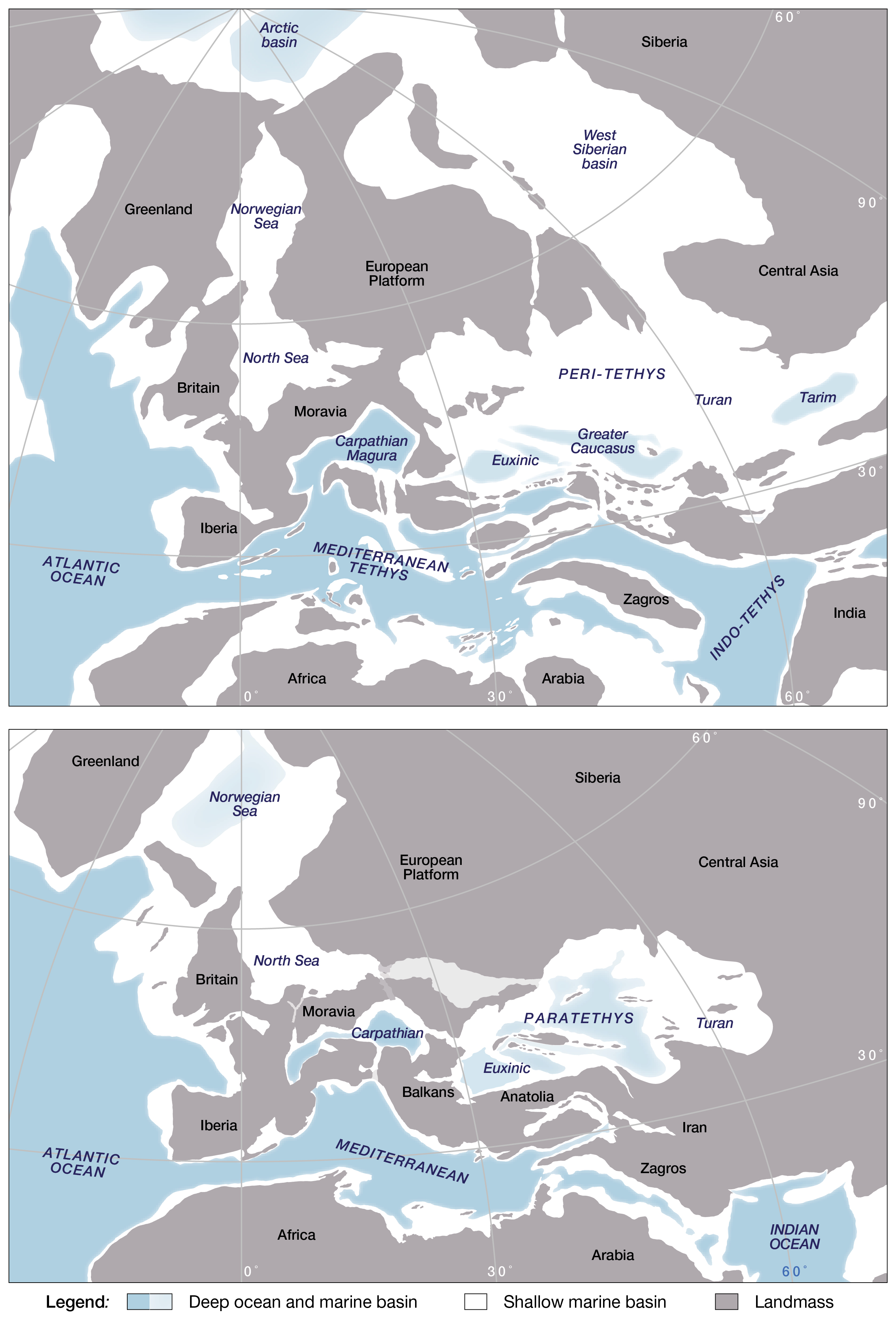
Vast regions of Europe and west-central Asia were still covered by a contiguous Tethys at the start of the Eocene (top image), but by the Oligocene, most of this had dried out (bottom image), and the Tethys was almost entirely divided into the Indian Ocean, Mediterranean and Paratethys.

Throughout the Cenozoic (66 million years to the dawn of the Neogene, 23 Mya), the connections between the Atlantic and Indian Oceans across the Tethys were eventually closed off in what is now the Middle East during the Miocene, as a consequence of the northern migration of Africa/Arabia and global sea levels falling due to the concurrent formation of the Antarctic Ice Sheet. This decoupling occurred in two steps, first around 20 Mya and another around 14 Mya. The complete closure of the Tethys led to a global reorganization of currents, and is what is thought to have allowed for upwelling in the Arabian Sea and led to the establishment of the modern South Asian Monsoon. It also caused major modifications to the functioning of the AMOC and ACC.

During the Oligocene (33.9 to 23 Mya), large parts of central and eastern Europe were covered by a northern branch of the Tethys Ocean, called the Paratethys. The Paratethys was separated from the Tethys with the formation of the Alps, Carpathians, Dinarides, Taurus, and Elburz mountains during the Alpine orogeny. During the late Miocene, the Paratethys gradually disappeared, and became an isolated inland sea. Separation from the wider Tethys during the early Miocene initially led to a boost in primary productivity for the Paratethys, but this gave way to a total ecosystem collapse during the late Miocene as a result of rapid dissolution of carbonate.

== Historical theory ==
In Chapter 13 of his 1845 book, Roderick Murchison described a distinctive formation extending from the Black Sea to the Aral Sea in which the creatures differed from those of the purely marine period that preceded them. The Miocene deposits of Crimea and Taman (south of the Sea of Azov) are identical with formations surrounding the present Caspian Sea, in which the univalves of freshwater origin are associated with forms of Cardiacae and Mytili that are common to partially saline or brackish waters. This distinctive fauna has been found throughout all the enormously developed Tertiary formations of the southern and south-eastern steppes.

... and leads at once to the conviction, that during long periods antecedent, as will be hereafter explained, to the historic æra, a vast region of Europe and Asia was covered by a Mediterranean Sea of brackish water, of which the present Caspian is the diminished type. ... To render the distinction between these accumulations and all others clear and unambiguous, we have adopted the term Aralo-Caspian, first applied in a geographical sense, by our great precursor Humboldt, to this region of the globe. ... Judging from the recital of travellers and from specimens of the rock, we have no doubt that it extended to Khivah and the Aral Sea; beyond which the low level of the adjacent eastern deserts would lead us to infer, that it spread over wide tracts in Asia now inhabited by the Turkomans and Kirghis, and was bounded only by the mountains of the Hindoo Kusk and Chinese Tartary. ... there can be no sort of doubt, that all the masses of water now separated from each other, from the Aral to the Black Sea inclusive, were formerly united in this vast pre-historical Mediterranean; which (even if we restrict its limits to the boundaries we already know, and do not extend them eastward, amid low regions untrodden by geologists) must have exceeded in size the present Mediterranean!

On the accompanying map, Murchison shows the Aralo-Caspian Formation extending from close to the Danube delta across Crimea, up the east side of the Volga river to Samara, then south of the Urals to beyond the Aral Sea. Brackish and upper freshwater components (OSM) of the Miocene are now known to extend through the North Alpine foreland basin and onto the Swabian Jura with thickness of up to 250 m (820 ft); these were deposited in the Paratethys when the Alpine front was still 100 km (62 mi) farther south.

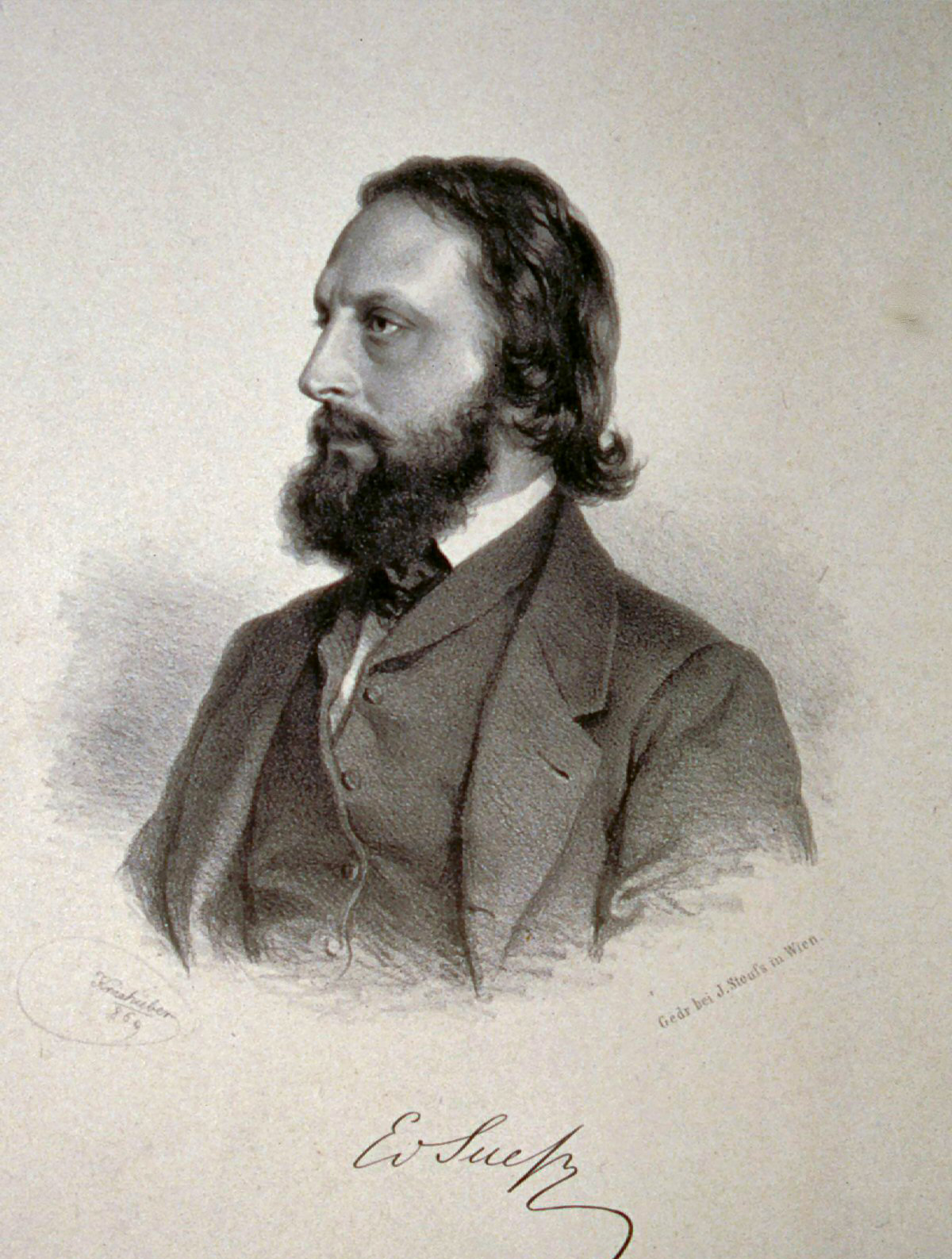
Geologist Eduard Suess in 1869

In 1885, the Austrian palaeontologist Melchior Neumayr deduced the existence of the Tethys Ocean from Mesozoic marine sediments and their distribution, calling his concept Zentrales Mittelmeer (lit. 'Central Mediterranean Sea') and described it as a Jurassic seaway, which extended from the Caribbean to the Himalayas.

In 1893, the Austrian geologist Eduard Suess proposed the hypothesis that an ancient and extinct inland sea had once existed between Laurasia and the continents which formed Gondwana II. He named it the Tethys Sea after the Greek sea goddess Tethys. He provided evidence for his theory using fossil records from the Alps and Africa. He proposed the concept of Tethys in his four-volume work Das Antlitz der Erde (The Face of the Earth).

In the following decades during the 20th century, "mobilist" geologists such as Uhlig (1911), Diener (1925), and Daque (1926) regarded Tethys as a large trough between two supercontinents which lasted from the late Palaeozoic until continental fragments derived from Gondwana obliterated it.

After World War II, Tethys was described as a triangular ocean with a wide eastern end.

From 1920s to the 1960s, "fixist" geologists, however, regarded Tethys as a composite trough, which evolved through a series of orogenic cycles. They used the terms 'Paleotethys', 'Mesotethys', and 'Neotethys' for the Caledonian, Variscan, and Alpine orogenies, respectively. In the 1970s and 1980s, these terms and 'Proto-Tethys', were used in different senses by various authors, but the concept of a single ocean wedging into Pangea from the east, roughly where Suess first proposed it, remained.

In the 1960s, the theory of plate tectonics became established, and Suess's "sea" could clearly be seen to have been an ocean. Plate tectonics provided an explanation for the mechanism by which the former ocean disappeared: oceanic crust can subduct under continental crust.

Tethys was considered an oceanic plate by Smith (1971); Dewey, Pitman, Ryan and Bonnin (1973); Laubscher and Bernoulli (1973); and Bijou-Duval, Dercourt and Pichon (1977).

== See also ==
- Hațeg Island – Prehistoric island
- List of ancient oceans – List of Earth's former oceans
- Paleo-Tethys Ocean – Ocean on the margin of Gondwana between the Middle Cambrian and Late Triassic
- Pannonian Sea – Shallow ancient sea where the Pannonian Basin in Central Europe is today
- Paratethys – Prehistoric shallow inland sea in Eurasia
- Piemont-Liguria Ocean – Former piece of oceanic crust that is seen as part of the Tethys Ocean
- Ruhpolding Formation – Geologic formation in Austria and Germany
- Tethyan Trench – Ancient oceanic trench
