= Hunic superterrane =

The Hunic superterrane is a terrane that is now attached to Europe and Asia. At the end of the Ordovician or beginning of the Silurian it separated from Gondwana and joined Laurasia at the beginning of the Carboniferous, at the time of the Variscan orogeny. Rather than being a single block, there were apparently two groups of blocks, the European Hunic terranes and the Asian Hunic terranes.

The collision with Laurasia (specifically, with the Kipchak arc) formed what is now known as Kazakhstania according to one geological model of the ancient Earth.

The Hunic terranes are named after the Huns, since they are found in the areas that the Huns occupied.

== See also ==
- Paleo-Tethys Ocean
- Rheic Ocean
