= Wrangellia terrane =

Geological area in northwestern North America

Coordinates: 59.984°N 140.588°W

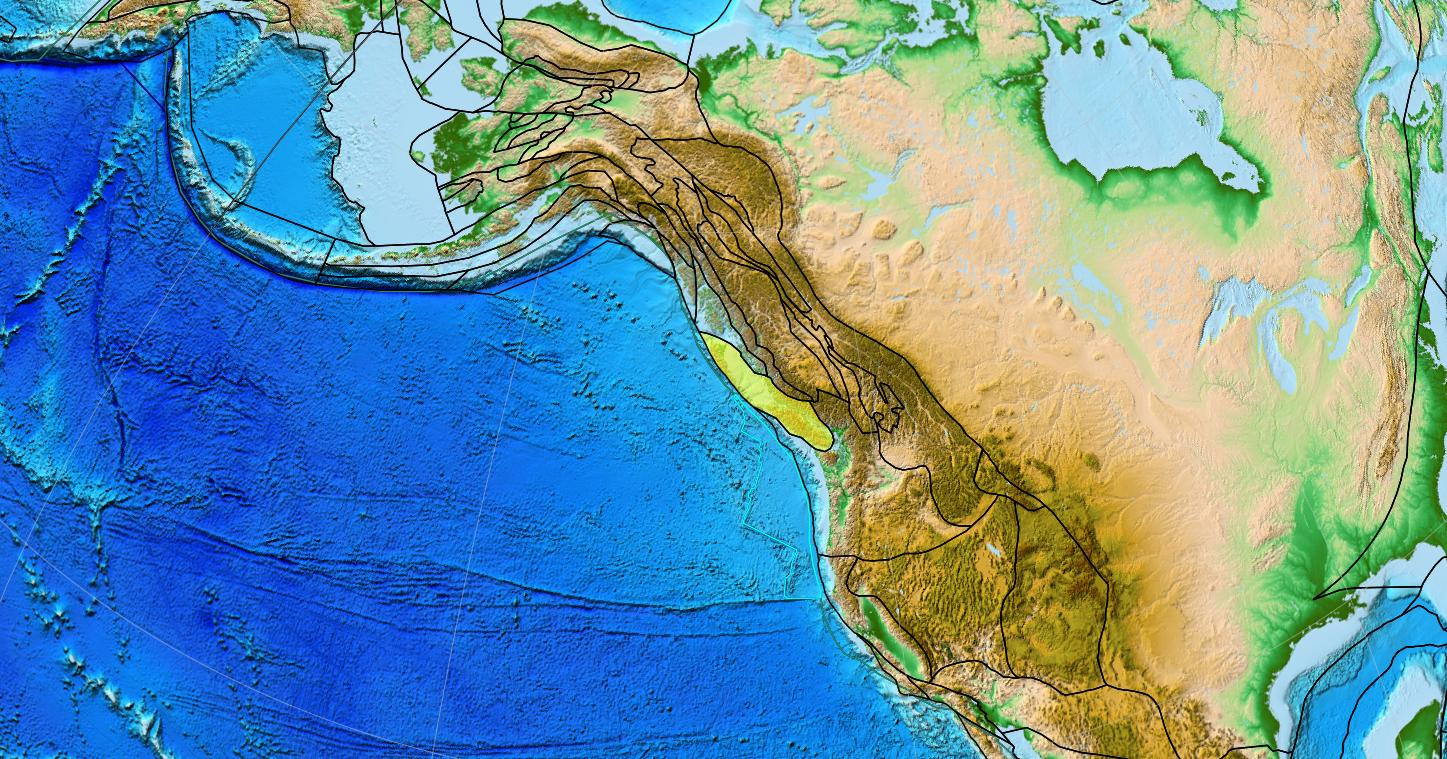
Current location and extent of Wrangellia (coloured yellow).

The Wrangellia terrane (named for the Wrangell Mountains, Alaska) is a crustal fragment (terrane) extending from the south-central part of Alaska and along the Coast of British Columbia in Canada. Some geologists contend that Wrangellia extends southward to Oregon, although this is not generally accepted.

== Extent and terminology ==
The term Wrangellia is confusingly applied to all of:

- The Wrangell(ia) Terrane alone;
- A composite terrane (CT) consisting of the Wrangell Terrane, Peninsular Terrane, and other rock units that were not originally part of the North American craton;
- A composite terrane which also includes the Alexander Terrane.

Earlier geologists sometimes used the term "Talkeetna Superterrane" to describe Wrangellia.

== Origin ==
There are two conflicting hypotheses about whether the Wrangellia Superterrane originated at polar or equatorial latitudes:

1. That Wrangellia accreted at a northerly latitude near its current location (when North America, or Laurentia, was farther east as part of Pangaea).
2. That Wrangellia originated c. 3,000 km (1,900 mi) south of its current location, approximately where Baja California is now. This hypothesis is not favoured in tectonic plate reconstructions favoring an Andean subduction model, specifically since it introduces allegedly large and rapid displacements of Wrangellia across the Panthalassic Ocean.

=== Northern hypothesis ===
Geological evidences indicate that the Caledonide closure of the Iapetus and Rheic Oceans along the Laurentian westcoast (modern coordinates) also opened an ocean between the northern margin of Laurentia and Baltica on one side and Siberia on the other. This effectively dispersed continental fragments—the Alexander, Eastern Klamath, Northern Sierra and Okanagan terranes—westward along the shores of this ocean in a back-arc process similar to that of the present-day Scotia Plate between the South America Plate and the Antarctic Plate. During the Carboniferous, the Alexander terrane migrated westward into the northern Panthalassic Ocean where it merged with Wrangellia in the late Carboniferous—the two continental fragments remained isolated in the open ocean until they were accreted to Laurentia in the Middle Jurassic.

=== Southern hypothesis ===
Rocks of Wrangellia (the individual terrane, not the composite terrane) were originally created in the Pennsylvanian to the Jurassic somewhere, but probably near the equator, in the Panthalassic Ocean off the west coast of Laurentia (North American craton) as island arcs, oceanic plateaus, and rock assemblages of the associated tectonic settings. It is composed of many rocks types, of various composition, age, and tectonic affinity, but the Late Triassic flood basalts are the defining unit of Wrangellia. These basalts, extruded onto land over 5 million years about 230 million years ago, on top of an extinct Pennsylvanian and Permian island arc, constitute a large igneous province, currently exposed in a 2,500 km (1,553 mi) long belt.

Wrangellia collided and amalgamated with the Alexander Terrane by Pennsylvanian time. By the end of the Triassic, the Peninsular Terrane had also joined the Wrangellia composite terrane. A subduction zone existed on the west side of Wrangellia. Seafloor rocks too light to be subducted were compressed against the west edge of Wrangellia; these rocks are now known as the Chugach Terrane. A complex fault system, known as the Border Ranges Fault, is the modern expression of the suture zone between Wrangellia and Chugach Terranes. Over time, plate tectonics moved this amalgamation of crust generally northeastward into contact with the North American continental margin. The Wrangellia composite terrane collided with and docked to North America by Cretaceous time. Strike-slip displacement, with Wrangellia travelling northward, continued after docking, although the amount of post-accretion displacement is controversial.

== See also ==
- List of Cascade volcanoes
- List of Northern Cordilleran volcanoes
- List of volcanoes in the United States
- Volcanology of Canada – Volcanic activity in Canada
- Volcanology of Western Canada
