= Proto-Tethys Ocean =

Ancient ocean that existed from the latest Ediacaran to the Carboniferous

The Proto-Tethys or Theic Ocean was an ancient ocean that existed from the latest Ediacaran to the Carboniferous (550–330 Ma).

== History of concept ==
The name "Proto-Tethys" has been used inconsistently for several concepts for a supposed predecessor of the Paleo-Tethys Ocean, a palaeocean that separated the margins of Gondwana, often referred to as peri-Gondwana, from various continents and Gondwana-derived continental fragments from Precambrian times and onwards. According to von Raumer & Stampfli 2008, after the Cadomian orogenic events 550 Ma, the Proto-Tethys Ocean formed the eastern part of an oceanic domain (of which the Iapetus and Tornquist oceans formed the western parts) which subducted under the northern margins of Gondwana. In this model the Proto-Tethys separated the North China and Baltica continents from Gondwana. In the Early Ordovician 500-480 Ma, the Proto-Tethys was subducted under Cadomia as a result of the Chamrousse back-arc basin. Torsvik & Cocks 2009 used the name 'Ran Ocean' for a similar concept, the Cambrian-Ordovician ocean that separated Baltica from Gondwana.

Other geologists dispute the existence of such an ocean.

== Palaeozoic evolution ==
The ocean formed when Pannotia disintegrated, Proto-Laurasia (Laurentia, Baltica, and Siberia) rifted away from a supercontinent that would become Gondwana. Proto-Tethys formed between these two supercontinents. The ocean was bordered by Panthalassic Ocean to the north, separating it from Panthalassa by island arcs and Kazakhstania. The Proto-Tethys expanded during the Cambrian. The ocean was at its widest during the Late Ordovician to Middle Silurian. The ocean was situated between the Siberia to the west, and Gondwana to the east. The ocean began to shrink during the Late Silurian, when North China, and South China moved away from Gondwana and headed north. In the late Devonian, the microcontinent of Kazakhstania collided with Siberia, shrinking the ocean even more. The ocean closed when the North China craton collided with Siberia-Kazakstania continent in the Carboniferous, while the Paleo-Tethys Ocean expanded.

== See also ==
- Paleo-Tethys Ocean
- Tethys Ocean
- Rheic Ocean
