= Panthalassa =

Prehistoric superocean that surrounded Pangaea

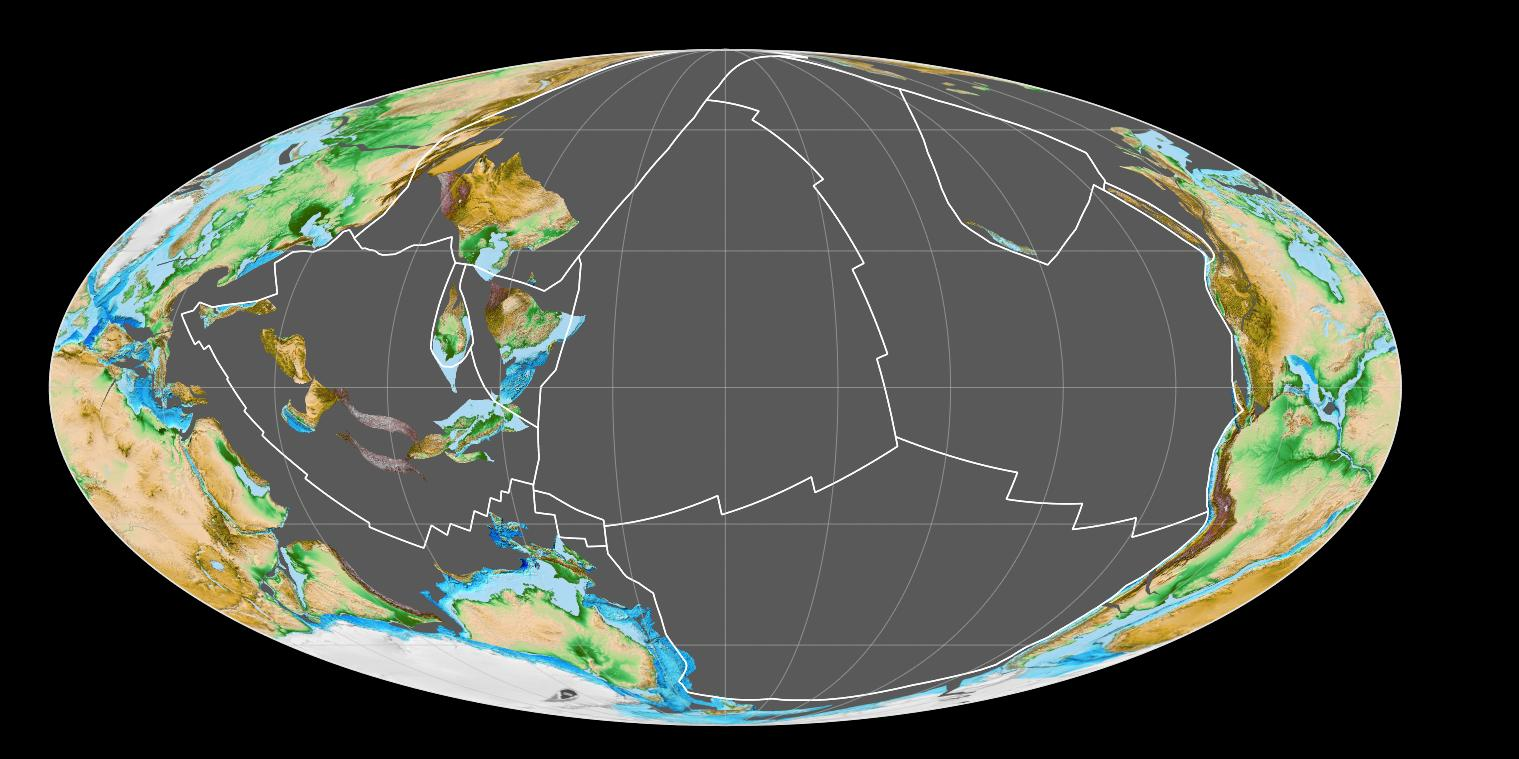
Paleomap of the Panthalassa superocean 250 million years ago

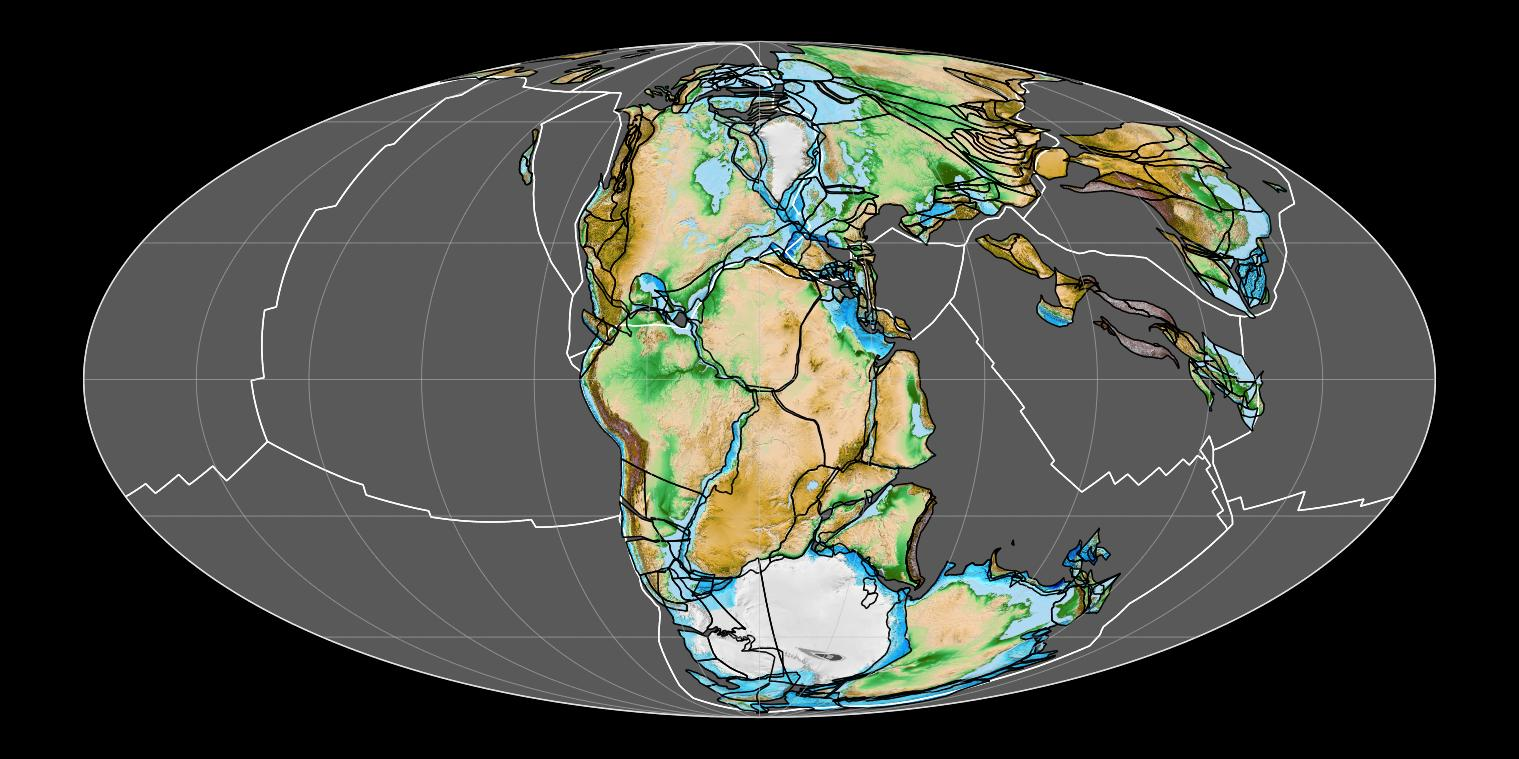
Paleomap of the supercontinent Pangaea in the early Mesozoic (at 200 Ma) surrounded by Panthalassa.

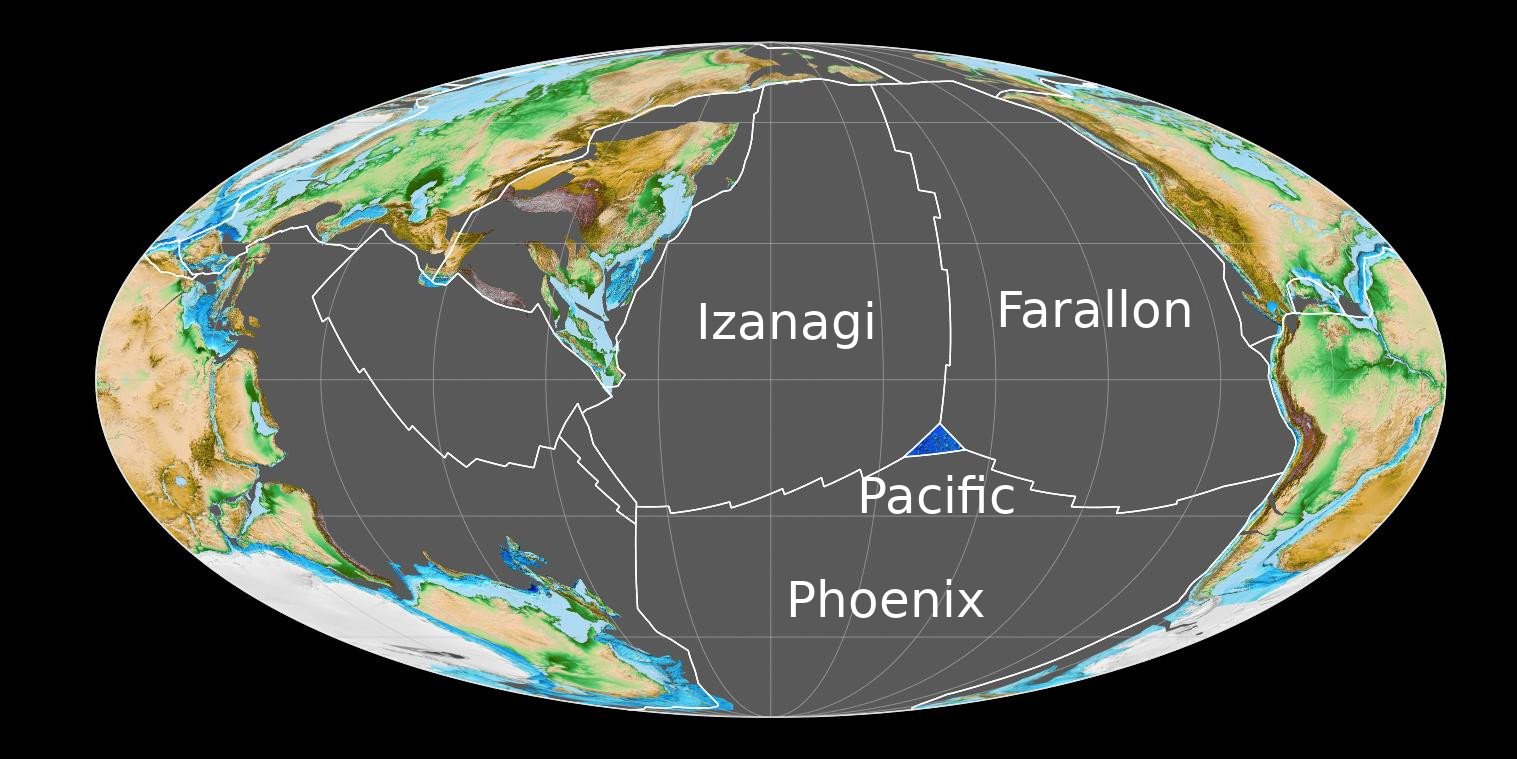
The Pacific Plate began forming when the triple junction at the center of Panthalassa destabilized about 190 million years ago.

In historical geology, Panthalassa, also known as the Panthalassic Ocean or Panthalassan Ocean (from Ancient Greek πᾶν (pan) 'all' and θάλασσα (thalassa) 'sea'), was the vast superocean that encompassed planet Earth and surrounded the supercontinent Pangaea, the latest in a series of supercontinents in the history of Earth. During the Paleozoic–Mesozoic transition (c. 250 Ma), the ocean occupied almost 70% of Earth's surface, with the supercontinent Pangaea taking up the remainder. The original, ancient ocean floor has now completely disappeared because of the continuous subduction along the continental margins on its circumference. Panthalassa is also referred to as the Paleo-Pacific ("old Pacific") or Proto-Pacific because the Pacific Ocean is a direct continuation of it.

== Formation ==
The supercontinent Rodinia started to break up 870–845 Ma probably as a consequence of a superplume caused by mantle slab avalanches along the margins of the supercontinent. In a second episode c. 750 Ma the western half of Rodinia started to rift apart: western Kalahari and South China broke away from the western margins of Laurentia; and by 720 Ma Australia and East Antarctica had also separated. In the Early Jurassic the Pacific Plate opened originating from a triple junction between the Panthalassic Farallon, Phoenix, and Izanagi plates. Panthalassa can be reconstructed based on magnetic lineations and fracture zones preserved in the western Pacific.

== Reconstruction of ocean basin ==
Most of the oceanic plates that formed the ocean floor of Panthalassa have been subducted and so traditional plate tectonic reconstructions based on magnetic anomalies can therefore be used only for remains from the Cretaceous and later. The former margins of the ocean, however, contain allochthonous terranes with preserved Triassic–Jurassic intra-Panthalassic volcanic arcs, including Kolyma–Omolon (northeast Asia), Anadyr–Koryak (east Asia), Oku–Niikappu (Japan), and Wrangellia and Stikinia (western North America). Furthermore, seismic tomography is being used to identify subducted slabs in the mantle from which the location of former Panthalassic subduction zones can be derived. A series of such subduction zones, called Telkhinia, defines two separate oceans or systems of oceanic plates—the Pontus and Thalassa oceans. Named marginal oceans or oceanic plates include (clockwise) Mongol-Okhotsk (now a suture between Mongolia and Sea of Okhotsk), Oimyakon (between Asian craton and Kolyma-Omolon), Slide Mountain Ocean (British Columbia), and Mezcalera (western Mexico).

=== Eastern margin ===
The eastern margin of the ocean coincided with the western margin (modern coordinates) of the continent Laurentia. The western margin of Laurentia originated during the Neoproterozoic break-up of Rodinia. The North American Cordillera is an accretionary orogen, which grew by the progressive addition of allochthonous terranes along this margin from the Late Palaeozoic. Devonian back-arc volcanism reveals how this eastern Panthalassic margin developed in the mid-Paleozoic into the active margin it still is today.

Most of the continental fragments, volcanic arcs, and ocean basins added to Laurentia this way contained faunas of Tethyan or Asian affinity. Similar terranes added to the northern Laurentia, in contrast, have affinities with Baltica, Siberia, and the northern Caledonies. The latter terranes were probably accreted along the eastern Panthalassa margin by a Caribbean–Scotia-style subduction system.

=== Western margin ===
The evolution of the Panthalassa–Tethys boundary is poorly known because little oceanic crust is preserved—both the Izanagi and the conjugate Pacific Ocean floor is subducted and the ocean ridge that separated them probably subducted c. 60–55 Ma. Today, the region is dominated by the collision of the Australian Plate with a complex network of plate boundaries in south-east Asia, including the Sundaland block. Spreading along the Pacific-Phoenix ridge ended 83 Ma at the Osbourn Trough at the Tonga-Kermadec Trench.

During the Permian, atolls developed near the Equator on the mid-Panthalassic seamounts. As Panthalassa subducted along its western margin during the Triassic and Early Jurassic, those seamounts and palaeo-atolls were accreted as allochthonous limestone blocks and fragments along the Asian margin. One such migrating atoll complex now form a two-kilometre-long (1.2 mi) and 100-to-150-metre-wide (330–490 ft) body of limestone in central Kyushu, south-west Japan.

Fusuline foraminifera, a now extinct order of single-celled organisms, diversified extensively and developed gigantism—the genus Eopolydiexodina, for example, reached up to 16 cm (6.3 in) in size—and structural sophistication, including symbiont relationships with photosynthesising algae, during the Late Carboniferous and Permian, in what is known as the Carboniferous-Earliest Permian Biodiversification Event. The Capitanian mass extinction event c. 260 Ma, however, put an end to that development, with only dwarf taxa persisting throughout the Permian until the final fusuline extinction in the Great Dying c. 252 Ma. Permian fusulines also developed a remarkable provincialism by which fusulines can be grouped into six domains. Because of the large size of Panthalassa, a hundred million years could separate the accretion of different groups of fusulines. Assuming a minimum accretion rate of 3 centimetres per year (1.2 in/year), the seamount chains on which those groups evolved would be separated by at least 3,000 km (1,900 mi). Those groups apparently evolved in completely different environments.

A significant sea-level drop at the end of the Permian led to the end-Capitanian extinction event. The cause for the extinction is disputed, but a likely candidate is an episode of global cooling, which transformed a large amount of sea-water into continental ice.

Seamounts accreted in eastern Australia as parts of the New England orogen reveal the hotspot history of Panthalassa. From the Late Devonian to the Carboniferous, Gondwana and Panthalassa converged along the eastern margin of Australia along a west-dipping subduction system, which produced (west to east) a magmatic arc, a forearc basin, and an accretionary wedge. Subduction ceased along that margin in the Late Carboniferous and jumped eastward. From the Late Carboniferous to the Early Permian the New England orogen was dominated by an extensional setting related to a subduction to strike-slip transition. Subduction was re-initiated in the Permian and the granitic rocks of the New England Batholith were produced by a magmatic arc, indicating the presence of an active plate margin along most of the orogen. Permian to Cretaceous remains of the convergent margin, preserved as fragments in Zealandia (New Zealand, New Caledonia, and the Lord Howe Rise), were rifted off Australia during the Late Cretaceous to Early Tertiary break-up of eastern Gondwana and the opening of the Tasman Sea.

The Cretaceous Junction Plate, located north of Australia, separated the eastern Tethys from Panthalassa.

== Palaeo-oceanography ==
Panthalassa was a hemisphere-sized ocean, much larger than the modern Pacific. It could be expected that the large size would result in relatively simple ocean current circulation patterns, such as a single gyre in each hemisphere, and a mostly stagnant and stratified ocean. Modelling studies, however, suggest that an east–west sea surface temperature gradient was present in which the coldest water was brought to the surface by upwelling in the east while the warmest water extended west into the Tethys Ocean. Subtropical gyres dominated the circulation pattern. The two hemispherical belts were separated by the undulating Intertropical Convergence Zone.

In northern Panthalassa, there were mid-latitude westerlies north of 60°N with easterlies between 60°N and the Equator. Atmospheric circulation north of 30°N is associated with the North Panthalassa High, which created Ekman convergence between 15°N and 50°N and Ekman divergence between 5°N and 10°N. A pattern developed that resulted in Sverdrup transport that went northward in divergence regions and southward in convergence regions. Western boundary currents resulted in an anti-cyclonic subtropical North Panthalassa gyre at mid-latitudes and a meridional anti-cyclonic circulation centred on 20°N.

In tropical northern Panthalassa, trade winds created westward flows while equatorward flows were created by westerlies at higher latitudes. Consequently, trade winds moved water away from Gondwana towards Laurasia in the northern Panthalassa Equatorial Current. When the western margins of Panthalassa were reached, intense western boundary currents would form the Eastern Laurasia Current. At mid-latitudes, the North Panthalassa Current would bring the water back east where a weak Northwestern Gondwana Current would finally close the gyre. The accumulation of water along the western margin, coupled with the Coriolis effect, would have created a Panthalassa Equatorial Counter Current.

In the southern Panthalassa, the four currents of the subtropical gyre, the South Panthalassa Gyre, rotated counterclockwise. The South Equatorial Panthalassa Current flowed westward between the Equator and 10°S into the western, intense South Panthalassa Current. The South Polar Current then completed the gyre as the Southwestern Gondwana Current. Near the poles easterlies created a subpolar gyre that rotated clockwise.

== See also ==
- Ring of Fire – Tectonic belt of earthquakes and volcanoes
- Paleontology – Study of past life through fossils
- Plate tectonics – Movement of Earth's lithosphere
- Mirovia – Hypothesized superocean surrounding the supercontinent Rodinia in the Neoproterozoic Era

== Sources ==
- Arias, C. (2008). "Palaeoceanography and biogeography in the Early Jurassic Panthalassa and Tethys oceans" (PDF). Gondwana Research. 14 (3): 306–315. Bibcode:2008GondR..14..306A. doi:10.1016/j.gr.2008.03.004.
- Colpron, M.; Nelson, J. L. (2009). "A Palaeozoic Northwest Passage: Incursion of Caledonian, Baltican and Siberian terranes into eastern Panthalassa, and the early evolution of the North American Cordillera" (PDF). Geological Society, London, Special Publications. 318 (1): 273–307. Bibcode:2009GSLSP.318..273C. doi:10.1144/SP318.10. S2CID 128635186.
- Flood, P. G. (1999). Exotic seamounts within Gondwanan accretionary complexes, Eastern Australia. Regional geology, tectonics and metallogenesis: New England orogen. University of New England, Armidale. pp. 23–29.
- Isozaki, Y. (2014). "Memories of Pre-Jurassic Lost Oceans: How To Retrieve Them From Extant Lands". Geoscience Canada. 41 (3): 283–311. doi:10.12789/geocanj.2014.41.050.
- Kani, T.; Hisanabe, C.; Isozaki, Y. (2013). "The Capitanian (Permian) minimum of ^{87}Sr/^{86}Sr ratio in the mid-Panthalassan paleo-atoll carbonates and its demise by the deglaciation and continental doming". Gondwana Research. 24 (1): 212–221. Bibcode:2013GondR..24..212K. doi:10.1016/j.gr.2012.08.025.
- Kasuya, A.; Isozaki, Y.; Igo, H. (2012). "Constraining paleo-latitude of a biogeographic boundary in mid-Panthalassa: Fusuline province shift on the Late Guadalupian (Permian) migrating seamount" (PDF). Gondwana Research. 21 (2): 611–623. Bibcode:2012GondR..21..611K. doi:10.1016/j.gr.2011.06.001.
- Kofukuda, D.; Isozaki, Y.; Igo, H. (2014). "A remarkable sea-level drop and relevant biotic responses across the Guadalupian–Lopingian (Permian) boundary in low-latitude mid-Panthalassa: Irreversible changes recorded in accreted paleo-atoll limestones in Akasaka and Ishiyama, Japan". Journal of Asian Earth Sciences. 82: 47–65. Bibcode:2014JAESc..82...47K. doi:10.1016/j.jseaes.2013.12.010.
- Li, Z. X.; Bogdanova, S. V.; Collins, A. S.; Davidson, A.; De Waele, B.; Ernst, R. E.; Fitzsimons, I. C. W.; Fuck, R. A.; Gladkochub, D. P.; Jacobs, J.; Karlstrom, K. E.; Lul, S.; Natapov, L. M.; Pease, V.; Pisarevsky, S. A.; Thrane, K.; Vernikovsky, V. (2008). "Assembly, configuration, and break-up history of Rodinia: A synthesis" (PDF). Precambrian Research. 160 (1–2): 179–210. Bibcode:2008PreR..160..179L. doi:10.1016/j.precamres.2007.04.021.
- Nokleberg, W. J.; Parfenov, L. M.; Monger, J. W. H.; Norton, I. O.; Khanchuk, A. I.; Stone, D. B.; Scotese, C. R.; Scholl, D. W.; Fujita, K. (2000). "Phanerozoic tectonic evolution of the circum-north Pacific" (PDF). USGS 231 Professional Paper. 1626: 1–122.
- Seton, M.; Müller, R. D. (2008). Reconstructing the junction between Panthalassa and Tethys since the Early Cretaceous. Eastern Australasian Basins III. Sydney: Petroleum Exploration Society of Australia, Special Publications. pp. 263–266.
- Talsma, A. S.; Müller, R. D.; Bunge, H.-P.; Seton, M. (2010). "The Geodynamic Evolution of the Junction Plate: Linking observations to high-resolution models" (PDF). 4th EResearch Australasia Conference.
- Van der Meer, D. G.; Torsvik, T. H.; Spakman, W.; Van Hinsbergen, D. J. J.; Amaru, M. L. (2012). "Intra-Panthalassa Ocean subduction zones revealed by fossil arcs and mantle structure" (PDF). Nature Geoscience. 5 (3): 215–219. Bibcode:2012NatGe...5..215V. doi:10.1038/ngeo1401.
- Waschbusch, P.; Beaumont, C.; Korsch, R. J. (1999). Geodynamic modelling of aspects of the New England Orogen and adjacent Bowen, Gunnedah and Surat basins. Regional geology, tectonics and metallogenesis: New England orogen. University of New England, Armidale. pp. 203–210.
