= Geological structure of Great Britain =

Overview of geological structures in Britain

The geological structure of Great Britain is complex, resulting as it does from a long and varied geological history spanning more than two billion years. This piece of the Earth's crust has experienced several episodes of mountain building or 'orogenies', each of which has added further complexity to the picture.

A wide range of geological structures occur across Britain and include examples at a variety of scales of:

- faults
- thrust faults
- folds
- sedimentary basins
- grabens and horsts
- unconformities

Our understanding of Britain's large-scale structure has been gained over many decades by simple geological field survey together with an increasing range of technological methods including gravity surveys, seismic surveys, aeromagnetic surveys and other forms of remote sensing.

== Terranes ==
A useful approach to considering Britain's geological structure is to examine the various terranes from which it is composed. These are essentially continental fragments whose boundaries are generally defined by faults. Individual terranes typically contain suites of structures, the histories and form of which differ from those of neighbouring terranes.

=== Terranes of Scotland ===
The Hebridean terrane is defined to the east by the Moine Thrust, beyond which lies the Northern Highlands terrane. This area in turn abuts against the Central Highlands (or Grampian) terrane along the Great Glen Fault. Similarly the Highland Boundary Fault separates the Central Highlands terrane from the Midland Valley terrane, which is itself separated from the Central Southern Uplands terrane by the Southern Uplands Fault. Each of these terranes form a part of the former continent of Laurentia whose southeastern margin is defined by the Iapetus Suture Zone, which runs parallel to the English-Scottish border, though some miles to its south.

=== Terranes of England and Wales ===
The Central Southern Uplands terrane extends across the northernmost part of England. Its southern margin is the Iapetus Suture, south of which lies the Leinster–Lakesman terrane which includes the Lake District and North Pennines. The majority of the rest of England and Wales north of the Variscan Front are considered to constitute the Avalon composite terrane. Central to this composite terrane is the triangular-shaped Midlands Microcraton; within it, the north–south aligned Malvern line (or 'Malvern lineament') divides the Wrekin terrane in the west from the Charnwood terrane in the east. The Isle of Anglesey and parts of the Lleyn peninsula are deemed to be composed of numerous micro-terranes, known collectively as the Rosslare–Monian terrane.

==== Pennine Block & Basin Province ====
Northern England is characterised by a series of fault-bound blocks separated by sedimentary basins whose origin can be traced back to the Carboniferous period. The North Pennines are formed on the Alston Block which is defined to the west by the Pennine Fault and to the north by the Stublick and Ninety Fathom Faults. It is separated from the Askrigg Block to the south by the Stainmore Trough. This latter block, coincident with the Yorkshire Dales, is defined to the west by the Dent Fault and to the south by the Craven Fault System. The Northumberland and Gainsborough Troughs lie to the north and south of these two blocks.

== Structural legacy of mountain-building episodes ==
Another approach to the study of the geological structure of the area is through consideration of the variety of structures resulting from each of several orogenies (or 'mountain-building' episodes) which have taken place over geological history. Structures originating in one event may play a part in subsequent orogenic events and be modified by them. Thus lines of crustal weakness commonly associated with, for example, the Caledonian Orogeny will often predate this particular mountain-building period, much as some of those created during this phase were reactivated during later events.

=== Caledonian Orogeny ===
The Caledonian orogeny took place between about 490 and 390 million years ago as the former micro-continent of Avalonia collided obliquely with the former continent of Laurentia along a line approximating to the modern English-Scottish border. This long drawn-out, multi-phase event resulted in innumerable geological structures, many of which have persisted to the present day and help to shape the landscapes of much of Britain, from South Wales northwards to the Shetland Islands. Key structures include:

- Moine Thrust
- Great Glen Fault
- Walls Boundary Fault
- Highland Boundary Fault
- Midland Valley graben
- Southern Uplands Fault
- Menai Strait fault zone
- Bala Fault
- Welsh Borderland fault system
- Cribarth Disturbance
- Neath Disturbance

Each of these structures is aligned northeast–southwest, albeit with the more northerly of them trending closer to NNE–SSW. A map or satellite photo readily reveals these major trends. There are hundreds of other lesser faults and folds which follow a similar alignment – a trend known as the Caledonoid trend.

=== Variscan orogeny ===
The Variscan orogeny was a complex affair whereby the former micro-continent of Armorica collided with Laurussia (otherwise known as Euramerica or the Old Red Continent), followed by a further collision between Gondwana and the enlarged Laurussia. In Britain it resulted in a variety of geological structures across the southwest from Pembrokeshire and South Glamorgan in Wales to Devon and Cornwall. Structures include:

- Dodman-Start Thrust
- Lizard Thrust
- Carrick Thrust

=== Post-Variscan crustal extension ===
An east-west extensional regime affecting the crust of England led to the formation of a series of structural basins developing through England between the English Channel and the Irish Sea during Permian and Triassic times. The Worcester Basin links to the Stafford Basin which in turn links to the Cheshire Basin and thence to the East Irish Sea Basin. The Needwood and Knowle basins are two smaller basins in the North Midlands associated with this rift complex.

=== Alpine orogeny ===
North-south cross-section through southern England, showing the Weald Basin, which was inverted during the Alpine Orogeny forming the Wealden Anticline. Vertical exaggeration 1:5.

The Alpine orogeny began 200 million years ago and continues to the present day. It comprises a series of collisions involving various micro-continents between northern Europe and Africa. Its effects are most evident in the Alps, Pyrenees, Carpathians and other mountain ranges of southern Europe, but the northernmost 'ripples' of this event have affected the structure of southern England. Structures include;

- Wealden Anticline
- Purbeck Monocline

== See also ==
- Geology of Great Britain
- Gravity anomalies of Britain and Ireland
- List of geological faults of England
- List of geological faults of Northern Ireland
- List of geological faults of Scotland
- List of geological folds in Great Britain
- Structural geology – Science of the description and interpretation of deformation in the Earth's crust
