= List of geological faults of England =

This is a list of the named geological faults affecting the rocks of England. See the main article on faults for a fuller treatment of fault types and nomenclature but in brief, the main types are normal faults, reverse faults, thrusts or thrust faults and strike-slip faults. Many faults may have acted as both normal faults at one time and as reverse or thrust faults at another and may or may not have also incorporated some degree of strike-slip movement too.

There are also a few 'disturbances'. These linear features are a combination of faults and folds - the relative importance of faulting and folding varying along the length of each disturbance.

== Key to tables ==
- Column 1 indicates the name of the fault. Note that different authors may use different names for the same fault or a section of it. Conversely the same name may be applied to more than one fault, particularly in the case of smaller faults which are geographically distant from each another. Some composite names e.g. Abbotsbury - Ridgeway Fault include individual faults e.g. Abbotsbury Fault and Ridgeway Fault appearing elsewhere in the list but are included since they have been referred to differently by different authors.
- Column 2 indicates the OS grid reference of the approximate midpoint of certain faults. Note that the mapped extent of a fault may not accurately reflect its actual extent.
- Column 3 indicates the county in which the fault occurs. Some traverse two or more counties of course.
- Column 4 indicates on which sheet, if any, of the British Geological Survey's 1:50,000 / 1" scale geological map series of England and Wales, the fault is shown and named (either on map/s or cross-section/s or both). A handful of BGS maps at other scales are listed too.
- Column 5 indicates a selection of publications in which references to the fault may be found. See references section for full details of publication.

== Alphabetical lists of faults ==
=== A ===
Fault name	OS map ref	County/sea area	BGS map sheet	book reference/s
Abberley Common Fault		Worcestershire	Guide Geol. of Martley	
Abberley Flagstaff Fault		Worcestershire	Guide Geol. of Martley	
Abbey Wood Fault		Shropshire		Mem E&W 152/153
Abbotts Leigh Fault			E&W 302	
Abbott Moss Fault		Cumbria	E&W 24	
Abbotsbury Fault		Dorset		BGS:BRG15, GA Guide22
Abbotsbury - Ridgeway Fault		Dorset	E&W 328, E&W 341/2	Mem E&W 328etc, GA Guide22
Ackworth Grange Fault			E&W 78	
Acton Bridge - Overton - East Delamere Fault		Cheshire		Smith et al. 2005
Adbaston Fault			E&W 139	
Agra Fault		Yorkshire	E&W 51	
Ainstable Fault		Cumbria	E&W 24	
Aire Valley Fault		Yorkshire	E&W 69	
Airy Fault		Cumbria	E&W 30	
Alderley Edge Fault				Plant et al. 1999
Alderley Fault			E&W 110	
Aldercar Fault			E&W 125	
All Hallows Pit Fault		Cumbria	E&W 23	
Allman Well Hill Fault		Yorkshire	E&W 87	
Alport Fault				Smith et al. 2005
Alveley Fault			E&W 167	
Alwinton Fault				BGS:BRG 7
Anne's Well Fault		Cumbria	E&W 30	
Antonstown Fault		Northumberland	E&W 12, E&W 13	BGS:BRG 7
Apedale Fault			E&W 123	
Apedale Vein			E&W 41	
Apley Park Fault			E&W 153	
Aqueduct Fault (Clwyd)		Clwyd		Smith et al. 2005
Aqueduct Fault (Shropshire)		Shropshire		Mem E&W 152/153
Archer Wood Fault	TQ 745185	East Sussex	E&W 320/321	
Ardwick Fault		Lancashire	E&W 85	
Argill Fault			E&W 31	
Arleston Fault			E&W 152	
Arley Fault				BGS:BRG 10
Arley Park Fault			E&W 167	
Arley Fault System		Warwickshire	E&W 169	
Artle Beck Fault Zone			E&W 59	
Artle Beck Faults			E&W 59	
Ash Hill Fault		Gloucestershire	E&W 234	
Ashcombe Fault		Gloucestershire	E&W 234	
Ashes Hollow Fault		Shropshire	E&W 166; ChStret:25K	
Ashton Fault		Lancashire	E&W 84	
Ashton Moss Fault		Lancashire	E&W 85	
Askerton Fault			E&W 12	
Atworth-Lacock Fault Belt			E&W 265	
Augill Fault			E&W 31	
Avon Thrust			E&W 264	

=== B ===
Fault name	OS map ref	County/sea area	BGS map sheet	book reference/s
Bache Fault			E&W 166	
Back Burn Fault		Cumbria	E&W 12	BGS:BRG 7
Bailey Hope Fault			E&W 12	
Bakewell Fault				Smith et al. 2005
Balcombe House Fault			E&W 302	
Ballard Down Fault		Dorset	E&W 342/3,	Mem E&W 328etc, GA Guide22
Ball's Hill Fault		Warwickshire	E&W 168	
Barbon Fault		?Cumbria/Yorks		Brenchley & Rawson 2006, BGS:BRG 7
Barebones Fault		Yorkshire	E&W 87	
Barelands Fault			E&W 303	
Barford St John Fault			E&W 218	
Barford St Michael Fault			E&W 218	
Barkston Fault			E&W 127	
Barnarm Fault			E&W 31	
Barnston Fault		Cheshire	E&W 96	
Barrasford Fault			E&W 13	
Barrock Gill Fault		Cumbria	E&W 24	
Barrow Fault		Derbyshire	E&W 141	
Barrow Fault		Yorkshire	E&W 87	
Barrow Hill Fault		Somerset	E&W 280, 281	
Barrow Vale Fault		Somerset	E&W 280	
Barrule Thrust Zone		Isle of Man		Brenchley & Rawson 2006, BGS:BRG 7
Baskill Fault		Cumbria	E&W 38	BGS:BRG 7
Beaminster Fault		Dorset		BGS:BRG 15
Beck Fault		Cumbria	E&W 24	
Beckces Fault		Cumbria	E&W 30	
Beckhead-Binky Linn Fault			E&W 12	
Bedgebury Fault			E&W 304	
Bellevue Fault			E&W 12	
Benenden Fault			E&W 304	
Benton Quarry Fault		Northumberland	E&W 15	
Bere Regis Fault		Dorset		GA Guide22
Berkeley Fault		Gloucestershire	E&W 234, E&W 251	
Berkley Marsh Fault		Somerset/Wiltshire	E&W 281	
Berry Hill Fault			E&W 123	
Bickerton - Peckforton Fault		Cheshire		BGS:BRG 10
Biddenden Fault			E&W 304	
Biddick Fault		Durham	E&W 21	
Biddle Fault		Somerset	E&W 280	
Billing Hill Fault		Yorkshire	E&W 69	
Billingsley Fault			E&W 167	
Bilsborrow Fault		Lancashire	E&W 67	
Bilston Fault			E&W 167	
Birchencliffe Fault		Yorkshire	E&W 77	
Birdwell Fault		Yorkshire	E&W 87	
Birkhouse Moor Fault		Cumbria	E&W 29	BGS:BRG 7
Birkness Combe Fault		Cumbria		Brenchley & Rawson 2006
Birmingham Fault		Warwickshire	E&W 168	Smith et al. 2005
Bittell Fault			E&W 183	
Bitton Fault		Gloucestershire	E&W 264, 265	
Black Cleugh Fault			E&W 12	
Black Knoll Fault			E&W 166	
Blackhall Fault	NZ440395	Durham	E&W 27	
Black Knowe Fault			E&W 12	
Black Stantling Fault			E&W 12	
Blackpool Fault			E&W 12	
Blaguegate Fault		Lancashire	E&W 84	
Blaisdon Fault		Gloucestershire	E&W 234	
Blakeney Fault				Mem E&W 233/250
Blaze Fell Fault		Cumbria	E&W 24	
Blencow Fault		Cumbria	E&W 24	
Blists Hill Fault		Shropshire		Mem E&W 152/153
Blockfield Fault			E&W 303	
Blockley Fault		Gloucestershire	E&W 217	
Blythbury Fault		Shropshire		Mem E&W 152/153
Bogside Fault			E&W 12	
Bolney Fault		Sussex	E&W 302, E&W 318/333	
Bolton Abbey Fault		Yorkshire	E&W 69	
Bolton Fault		Northumberland		BGS:BRG 7
Bolton-Swindon Fault		Northumberland	E&W 9	
Bondicarr Fault		Northumberland	E&W 10	
Bonsall Fault			E&W 112	Smith et al. 2005
Boothen Fault			E&W 123	
Boothorpe Fault		Derbyshire	E&W 141, 155 (x-section)	Smith et al. 2005
Bootle Fell Fault		Cumbria		Brenchley & Rawson 2006, BGS:BRG 7
Bootle Fell Thrust		Cumbria		Brenchley & Rawson 2006
Borde Hill Fault			E&W 302	
Boredale Fault		Cumbria	E&W 30	
Boston Fault			E&W 97	
Boston Fault		Lancashire	E&W 84	
Bothel Fault		Cumbria	E&W 23	
Boughspring Fault		Gloucestershire		Mem E&W 233/250
Boughthill Fault			E&W 13	
Boundary Fault			E&W 97	
Boundary Fault			E&W 153	
Bouth Fault		Cumbria		Brenchley & Rawson 2006, BGS:BRG 7
Bowscar Fault		Cumbria	E&W 24	
Brackenhill Fault		Cumbria		BGS:BRG 7
Brackensburgh Fault		Cumbria	E&W 12, E&W 24	
Bradford Fault		Lancashire	E&W 85	
Bradley Fault		Yorkshire	E&W 69	
Bradley's Fault		Shropshire		Mem E&W 152/153
Braithwaite Fault		Yorkshire	E&W 51	
Bramham Fault		Yorkshire	E&W 70	
Bramley Fault		Yorkshire	E&W 69, 70	
Bran Point Fault		Dorset	GA Guide22	
Brathay Fault		Cumbria	E&W 38	Brenchley & Rawson 2006, BGS:BRG 7
Breadsall Fault			E&W 125	
Brede Valley Fault	TQ 850176	East Sussex	E&W 320/321	
Bredon Hill Fault		Worcestershire	E&W 216	
Breedon Fault		Derbyshire	E&W 141	Smith et al. 2005
Breward Fault			E&W 153	
Brewer's Oak Fault			E&W 153	
Brewood Fault		Staffordshire		Smith et al. 2005
Bride Fault		Dorset	E&W 327	
Bride-Puncknowle Fault		Dorset		Mem E&W 328etc
Bridgemere Fault			E&W 123	
Bridport Fault		Dorset		BGS:BRG 15, Mem E&W 328etc
Brierley Hill Trough North Fault			E&W 167	
Brigg Fault			E&W 89	
Brightling Fault	TQ 660214	East Sussex	E&W 319/334	
Brinscall Fault		Lancashire	E&W 75	
Bristol Channel Fault Zone		Bristol Channel		
Bristol Channel-Bray Fault				Brenchley & Rawson 2006
Broad Chalke Fault			E&W 298	
Broadwell Thrust		Gloucestershire	E&W 217	
Brockhurst Fault		Shropshire		Toghill P. 2006
Brockley Fault		Gloucestershire	E&W 264	
Brockmoor Fault			E&W 167	
Brockton Fault		Shropshire	E&W 152	Toghill P. 2006; Mem E&W 152/153
Brook House - King Street Fault				Smith et al. 2005
Brook House Fault				Plant et al. 1999
Brookside Fault		Shropshire		Mem E&W 152/153
Broomhill Fault		Yorkshire	E&W 87	
Broseley Fault		Shropshire		Mem E&W 152/153
Brownber Fault			E&W 31	
Brownfield Vein			E&W 41	
Broxtowe Fault		E&W 125		
Bruntcliffe Fault		Yorkshire	E&W 77	
Bryn Crop Fault		Lancashire	E&W 84	
Bullgill Fault			E&W 22	
Bullstake Fault		Lancashire	E&W 84	
Burcot Fault			E&W 152	Mem E&W 152/153
Burgess Hill Fault		Sussex	E&W 302, E&W 318/338	
Burley Moor Fault		Yorkshire	E&W 69	
Burnt Oak Fault			E&W 303	
Burradon Fault		Northumberland	E&W 15	
Burtness Comb Fault		Cumbria		BGS:BRG 7
Burton Fault		Derbyshire/Staffs	E&W 141, 152	Smith et al. 2005
Burton Coggles Fault			E&W 143	
Burton Green-Warwick Fault		Warwickshire	E&W 184	
Burwash Common Fault			E&W 303	
Bushbury Fault			E&W 153	
Butterknowle Fault	NZ 400341	Durham	E&W 27, 32; UK (north) 625K	
Butterwick Fault	NZ 375310	Durham	E&W 27	
Buttons Farm Fault			E&W 303	

=== C ===
Fault name	OS map ref	County/sea area	BGS map sheet	book reference/s
Calcot Fault			E&W 251	
Caldy Fault		Cheshire	E&W 96	
Callowhill Fault			E&W 123	
Calverley Fault		Yorkshire	E&W 69	
Canadia Fault	TQ 735180	East Sussex	E&W 320/321	
Cannop Colliery Fault Belt		Gloucestershire		Mem E&W 233/250
Carleton Fault			E&W 78	
Carrick Thrust		Cornwall	Tect B&Ire 1:500K, E&W 346, E&W 352, E&W 353	
Carrock End Fault		Cumbria	E&W 23	Brenchley & Rawson 2006
Castle Street Fault		Lancashire	E&W 96	
Catsfield Stream Fault	TQ 718130	East Sussex	E&W 320/321	
Catterton Fault		Yorkshire	E&W 70	
Caudle Green Fault		Gloucestershire	E&W 234	
Caughley Fault		Shropshire		Mem E&W 152/153
Causey Pike Fault (a.k.a. Causey Pike Thrust)		Cumbria	E&W 28, 29	Brenchley & Rawson 2006, BGS:BRG 7
Cawsand Fault		Cornwall	E&W 348	
Cefn Einion Fault (*Cefn Einon Fault)		Shropshire	E&W 165	Toghill P. 2006
Central English Channel Fault				
Chamber Fault		Lancashire	E&W 85	
Champany Hill Fault		Yorkshire	E&W 87	
Chapel Beck Fault		Cumbria	E&W 39	
Charnwood Boundary Fault				Smith et al. 2005
Chatterley Fault			E&W 123	
Chaytor Rake			E&W 41	
Chelborough Fault belt				BGS:BRG 15
Chepstow Fault		Gloucestershire		Mem E&W 233/250
Chewton Fault		Somerset	E&W 280	
Child's Ercall Fault			E&W 139	
Chilmark Teffont Fault			E&W 298	
Chingley Fault			E&W 303, E&W 304	
Chippenham Fault			E&W 265	
Chirton Fault		Northumberland	E&W 15	
Church Stretton Fault		Shropshire		Toghill P. 2006
Church Stretton Fault Complex			E&W 166	
Church Stretton Fault System				Brenchley & Rawson 2006
Cinderhill Fault or Cinderhill Fault System			E&W 125, E&W 126	Smith et al. 2005
Clandown Fault		Somerset	E&W 281, Bristol Special 1"	
Claughton Fault			E&W 59	
Claxheugh Fault		Durham	E&W 21	
Clay Gap Fault		Cumbria	E&W 23	
Clayhanger Fault			E&W 154	
Cleadon Fault		Durham	E&W 21	
Clearburn Pasture Vein			E&W 41	
Clearwell Fault		Gloucestershire	E&W 233	
Cleckheaton Fractures		Yorkshire	E&W 77	
Cleeve Fault		Gloucestershire	E&W 264	
Clevedon Fault		Gloucestershire	E&W 264	
Clevedon Thrust			E&W 264	
Clews Wood Fault		Shropshire		Mem E&W 152/153
Cliff End Fault	TQ 886130	East Sussex	E&W 320/321	
Clifton Fault			E&W 125, E&W 126	
Clipsham Fault			E&W	
Clitheroe Fault System		Lancashire	E&W 67	
Close End Fault			E&W 22	
Closehouse-Lunedale Fault		Durham		BGS:BRG 7
Clotton Fault			E&W 109	
Cluddley Fault			E&W 152	Mem E&W 152/153
Clutton Fault		Somerset	E&W 280	
Coal Pit Heath Fault		Somerset	Bristol Special 1", E&W 265	
Coalbrookdale Boundary Fault				Smith et al. 2005
Cobscar Vein			E&W 41	
Cockshot Hill Thrust		Worcestershire		BGS:BRG 11, Guide Geol. of Martley
Codford Circle Fault			E&W 298	
Coed Ithel Fault		Gloucestershire		Mem E&W 233/250
Coghurst Fault	TQ 795136	East Sussex	E&W 320/321	
Coker Fault			E&W 313	
Coker-Cranborne Fault				Mem E&W 328etc
Colebatch Fault			E&W 165	
Collywell Fault		Northumberland	E&W 15	
Colsterworth Fault			E&W 143	
Colwell Fault		Durham	E&W 13, E&W 14	
Combe Bissett Fault			E&W 298	
Combe Martin Fault				BGS:BRG 15
Compton Fault			E&W 298	
Coneyburrow Wood Fault			E&W 303	
Coniston Fault		Cumbria	E&W 29, 38	Brenchley & Rawson 2006, BGS:BRG 7
Copley Fault		Durham	E&W 32	
Copperas House Fault		Lancashire	E&W 84	
Coppice Green Fault			E&W 153	
Corbetts Fault		Shropshire		Mem E&W 152/153
Corbyn's Hall Fault			E&W 167	
Corsham Fault			E&W 265	
Corston Fault			E&W 251	
Coseley Wednesbury Fault		Warwickshire	E&W 168	
Cotham Fault			E&W 126	
Cothelstone Fault		Somerset		BGS:BRG 15
Coton Park Fault				Smith et al. 2005
Cove Fault		Cumbria	E&W 30	
Cowbeech Fault Fault	TQ 601148	East Sussex	E&W 319/334	
Cowfold Fault			E&W 302	
Coxe Fault		Lancashire	E&W 85	
Coxwold-Gilling-Linton Fault			E&W 53	
Cradley Fault			E&W 167 ?	
Crag Point Fault		Northumberland	E&W 15	
Cragend-Chartners Fault		Northumberland	E&W 9	
Cragg Hill - Lawnswood Fault		Yorkshire	E&W 69	
Craignant - Milton Fault				Smith et al. 2005
Cranborne Fault				
Cranmore Fault			E&W 281	
Craven-Flamborough Fault belt		Yorkshire		BGS:BRG 9
Crawley Fault			E&W 302	
Cridling Stubbs Fault			E&W 78	
Crimea Fault		Durham	E&W 14, 15	
Cringle Fault			E&W 143	
Cromford and Annesley Park Fault			E&W 125	
Cronton Fault			E&W 97	
Crosby Fault		Lancashire	E&W 83	
Crossgill Fault			E&W 59	
Crow Hill Fault		Yorkshire	E&W 77	
Crowcrofts Fault			E&W 123	
Crowdundle Fault		Cumbria	E&W 24	
Crowpits Fault			E&W 303	
Croxteth Fault			E&W 83, E&W 97	
Crummock Fault		Cumbria	E&W 23	
Culgaith Fault		Cumbria	E&W 24	

=== D ===
Fault name	OS map ref	County/sea area	BGS map sheet	book reference/s
Dabler Fault		Shropshire		Mem E&W 152/153
Dale Abbey Fault			E&W 125	
Daleman Fault		Cumbria	E&W 30	
Danehill Fault			E&W 302, 303	
Dane Hill Fault			E&W 218	
Dappley Moor Fault			E&W 12	
Darfield Fault		Yorkshire	E&W 87	
Dark Lane Fault		Shropshire		Mem E&W 152/153
Darwell Fault	TQ 704196	East Sussex	E&W 320/321	
Darwen Valley Fault		Lancashire	E&W 75	
Deancorner Fault		Shropshire		Mem E&W 152/153
Dearham Fault			E&W 22	
Dearne Valley Fault		Yorkshire	E&W 87	
Deep Clough Fault			E&W 59	
Deepslack Fault (or Deep Slack Fault)		Cumbria	E&W 24, 39	
Denholme Clough Fault		Yorkshire	E&W 69	
Dent Fault			E&W 40, 50; Tect B&Ire 1:500K	Brenchley & Rawson 2006, BGS:BRG 7
Denton Fault		Lancashire	E&W 85	
Denton Fault		Durham	E&W 32	
Denton Reverse Fault			E&W 127	
Derbyshire Hill Fault			E&W 97	
Derwent Water Fault		Cumbria	E&W 29	Brenchley & Rawson 2006
Deuxhill Fault			E&W 167	
Dibberford Fault				Mem E&W 328etc
Dicken's Heath Fault		Warwickshire	E&W 168, E&W 183	
Dilhorne Fault			E&W 124	
Dodman - Start Thrust		Devon	Tect B&Ire 1:500K	
Dodman Thrust		Cornwall	E&W 352, E&W 353	
Dodsmoors Fault		Shropshire		Mem E&W 152/153
Doeford Fault		Lancashire	E&W 67	
Donnington Fault		Herefordshire	E&W 216	
Dorehead Fault		Cumbria	E&W 38	Brenchley & Rawson 2006, BGS:BRG 7
Dorn Valley Fault			E&W 218	
Doseley Fault		Shropshire		Mem E&W 152/153
Dothill Fault			E&W 152	Mem E&W 152/153
Doughty Fault		Shropshire		Mem E&W 152/153
Dovenby Station Fault			E&W 22	
Downall Green Fault			E&W 97	
Downend Fault			E&W 251	
Downhead Fault			E&W 281	
Dowsing Fault		North Sea		Brenchley & Rawson 2006
Dowsing Fault belt		North Sea		BGS:BRG 9
Dowsing Fault Zone		North Sea	Tect B&Ire 1:500K	
Drift River Fault			E&W 22	
Drygill Fault		Cumbria	E&W 37	
Dubgarth Fault			E&W 60	
Duddington Fault				BGS:BRG 10
Dufton Pike Fault			E&W 31	
Dungeon Banks Fault				Plant et al. 1999
Dunkirk Fault			E&W 126	
Durham Main Fault		Durham	E&W 27	
Durley Hill Fault		Gloucestershire	E&W 264	

=== E ===
Fault name	OS map ref	County/sea area	BGS map sheet	book reference/s
Eakring-Foston Fault			E&W 126	
Earsley - Scarcroft Fault		Yorkshire	E&W 70	
Easington Fault	NZ 410436	Durham	E&W 27	
East Christianbury Fault			E&W 12	
East Delamere Fault			E&W 109	
East Flowers Hill Fault		Gloucestershire	E&W 264	
East Malvern/s Fault		Worcestershire	E&W 216	
East Manchester Fault		Lancashire	E&W 85	
East Skelton Fault			E&W 12	
Eastern Boundary Fault		Warwickshire	E&W 168	BGS:BRG 10
Easton Wood Fault			E&W 143	
Ebbor Thrust		Somerset	E&W 280	
Eccleston East Fault			E&W 97	
Eccleston West Fault			E&W 97	
Edgerley - Waverton Fault				Smith et al. 2005
Edgerley Fault			E&W 109	
Elf Kirk Fault			E&W 12	
Ellonby Fault		Cumbria	E&W 24	
Else Gill Fault		Cumbria	E&W 24	
Emborough Thrust		Somerset	E&W 280	
Enville Fault			E&W 167	BGS:BRG 10
Ercall Mill Fault		Shropshire		Toghill P. 2006, BGS:BRG 11
Eskdale Fault		Cumbria	E&W 38	Brenchley & Rawson 2006, BGS:BRG 7
Ewanrigg Fault			E&W 22	
Eypemouth-Litton Cheney-Winterborne Fault Zone				Mem E&W 328etc
Eype's (or Eype) Mouth Fault			E&W 326; 327	Mem E&W 328etc, GA Guide 22

=== F ===
Fault name	OS map ref	County/sea area	BGS map sheet	book reference/s
Fairlight Cove Reversed Fault	TQ 870124	East Sussex	E&W 320/321	
Fairyhill Fault		Gloucestershire	E&W 264	
Fallowfield Fault			E&W 13	
Farmborough Fault Belt			E&W 281, Bristol Special 1"	
Farsley - Scarcroft Fault		Yorkshire	E&W 69	
Feizor Fault			E&W 60	
Feldom Fault			E&W 41	
Fenay Bridge Fault		Yorkshire	E&W 77	
Feren Park Fault			E&W 298	
Finchcocks Fault			E&W 304	
Finkle Street Fault		Yorkshire	E&W 87	
Finsthwaite Fault		Cumbria		Brenchley & Rawson 2006, BGS:BRG 7
Firbank Fault		Cumbria	E&W 39	BGS:BRG 7
Fishponds Fault			E&W 125	
Flamborough Head Fault Zone		Yorkshire		
Fletching Fault			E&W 303	
Flimwell Fault			E&W 303, E&W 304	
Flockton Fault		Yorkshire	E&W 77	
Florence Fault		Cumbria	E&W 22	BGS:BRG 7 (p197)
Fonthill Fault			E&W 302	
Footlands Fault	TQ 800201	East Sussex	E&W 320/321	
Foregill Vein			E&W 41	
Foss Bridge Fault			E&W 126, E&W 142	
Foul Ness Fault	TQ 832096	East Sussex	E&W 320/321	
Foxfield Fault		Cumbria		Brenchley & Rawson 2006
Fox House Fault			E&W 100	
Frankby Fault		Cheshire	E&W 96	
Freechase Fault			E&W 302	
Friarhillgate Fault			E&W 12	
Frithknowle-Drewitts Fault			E&W 302	
Frodsham Fault			E&W 97	
Frome Valley Fault			E&W 328	Mem E&W 328etc

=== G ===
Fault name	OS map ref	County/sea area	BGS map sheet	book reference/s
Gamston Fault			E&W 126	
Ganbrook Fault			E&W 265	
Gargrave Fault		Yorkshire	E&W 69	
Garmondsway Fault	NZ 335343	Durham	E&W27	
Garston's Farm Fault		Sussex	E&W 318/338	
Gasdale Thrust*				Brenchley & Rawson 2006
Gasgale Thrust*		Cumbria		BGS:BRG 7
Gate Castle Fault		Cumbria	E&W 24	
Giant's Hall Fault		Lancashire	E&W 84	
Gilcrux Fault		Cumbria	E&W 22, E&W 23	Brenchley & Rawson 2006
Glasshouse Fault		Herefordshire	E&W 216	
Glassonby Beck Fault		Cumbria	E&W 24	
Gleaston Fault		Lancashire	E&W 58	
Glyme Valley Fault			E&W 218	
Glynleigh Fault	TQ 610067	East Sussex	E&W 319/334	
Goat Island-Lyne Fault (or 'Thrust')		Cumbria	E&W12?	BGS:BRG 7
Godkin Fault			E&W 125	
Golden Cap Fault			E&W 326; 327	
Gotwick Farm Fault			E&W 303	
Grange Fault (Cheshire)		Cheshire	E&W 96	
Grange Fault (Shropshire)		Shropshire		Mem E&W 152/153
Grassguards Fault		Cumbria	E&W 38	Brenchley & Rawson 2006, BGS:BRG 7
Gravel Hill Fault		Somerset	E&W 280	
Grayrigg Fault		Cumbria	E&W 39	Brenchley & Rawson 2006, BGS:BRG 7
Greasby Fault		Cheshire	E&W 96	
Great Barr Fault		Warwickshire	E&W 168	
Great Blackside Vein			E&W 41	
Great East Fault		Shropshire		Mem E&W 152/153
Great Haigh Fault		Lancashire	E&W 75, E&W 84	
Great Oddynes Fault			E&W 302	
Great Witley Fault		Worcestershire	Guide Geol. of Martley	
Great Wood Fault	TQ 768158	East Sussex	E&W 320/321	
Greatham Fault	NZ 490276	Durham	E&W33	
Green Fault			E&W 13	
Greenburn Thrust		Cumbria	E&W 38	Brenchley & Rawson 2006, BGS:BRG 7
Greendale Fault (Cumbria)		Cumbria	E&W 38	Brenchley & Rawson 2006, BGS:BRG 7
Greenhurst Fault			E&W 303	
Greyhound Fault		Shropshire		Mem E&W 152/153
Grey Crag Fault		Cumbria	E&W 30	
Greygame Vein			E&W 41	
Greystoke Fault		Cumbria	E&W 24	
Grimsargh Fault		Lancashire	E&W 67	
Grindle Fault		Shropshire		Mem E&W 152/153
Grindon Hill Fault			E&W 13	
Grovesend Fault*		Gloucestershire		Mem E&W 233/250
Guestling Green Fault	TQ 851140	East Sussex	E&W 320/321	
Gulf Fault			E&W 112	

=== H ===
Fault name	OS map ref	County/sea area	BGS map sheet	book reference/s
Habberley Fault			E&W 152	
Haddock's Reversed Fault	TQ 870130	East Sussex	E&W 320/321	
Hadley Fault		Shropshire		Mem E&W 152/153
Hagg Fault			E&W 125	
Hagloe Fault		Gloucestershire	E&W 234	
Halesfield Fault		Shropshire		Mem E&W 152/153
Hallington Reservoir Fault		Durham	E&W 13, E&W 14	
Halsall Fault		Lancashire	E&W 83	
Halton Fault			E&W 97	
Hangmanstone Fault		Yorkshire	E&W 87	
Hardington Fault		Somerset	E&W 281	
Harlequin Fault			E&W 126	
Harrett's Linn Fault			E&W 12	
Harrington Fault		Shropshire		Mem E&W 152/153
Hartcliff Rock Fault		Gloucestershire	E&W 264	
Hartley Station Fault		Northumberland	E&W 15	
Hartley Steps Fault		Northumberland	E&W 15	
Hartpury Fault		?	E&W 216	
Haughton Fault		Shropshire		Mem E&W 152/153
Hauxley Fault		Northumberland	E&W 10	
Havannah Weetslade Fault		Durham	E&W14	
Hay Farm Fault		Shropshire		Mem E&W 152/153
Hayborough Fault			E&W 22	
Hayes Fault			E&W 167	
Hayeswater Fault		Cumbria	E&W 30	
Hazlegill Fault		Cumbria	E&W 23	
Hazel Gill Fault			E&W 22	
Hazlerigg – West Cramlington Fault		Durham	E&W 15, 27	
Healeyfield Fault		Durham	E&W 26, E&W 27	
Helmsley-Filey Fault		Yorkshire		BGS:BRG 9
Hem Fault		Shropshire		Mem E&W 152/153
Hendall Wood Fault			E&W 303	
Hendon Fault		Durham	E&W 21	
Hendre Fault			E&W 165	
Henfield Wood Fault			E&W 302	
Herstmonceux Fault	TQ 630121	East Sussex	E&W 319/334	
Hetton Fault		Northumberland		BGS:BRG 7
Hewenden Fault		Yorkshire	E&W 69	
Heywood Fault			E&W 281	
High Barnes Fault		Durham	E&W 21	
High Carr Fault			E&W 123	
High Ireby Fault		Cumbria	E&W 23	
High Lankhurst Fault	TQ 800142	East Sussex	E&W 320/321	
Highbeech Fault	TQ 785125	East Sussex	E&W 320/321	
Highfields Fault			E&W 125	
Highfield Crag Fault		Cumbria	E&W 30	
Hillbeck Fault			E&W 31	
Hill End (or Hillend) Thrust		Shropshire	E&W 166; ChStret:25K	
Hillhouse Fault		Lancashire	E&W 83	
Hilltop Fault			E&W 12	
Hilton Fault			E&W 31	
Hilton Main Fault			E&W 153	
Hinton Charterhouse Fault		Somerset	E&W 281	
Hints Fault				Smith et al. 2005
Hipperholme Fault		Yorkshire	E&W 77	
Hodge Hill Fault			E&W 167	
Hodnet Fault			E&W 123	Toghill P. 2006
Hoggett Gill Fault		Cumbria		Brenchley & Rawson 2006, BGS:BRG 7
Hog Wash Fault			E&W 12	
Hole of Lyne Fault			E&W 12	
Holford Manor Fault		Sussex	E&W 318/338	
Holinswood Fault		Shropshire		Mem E&W 152/153
Hollybush Fault			E&W 123	
Hollyhill Fault		Cumbria	E&W 24	
Hollywood Fault			E&W 123	
Holm Fault			E&W 60	
Holmbush Fault			E&W 302	
Holmer Fault		Shropshire		Mem E&W 152/153
Homestall Fault			E&W 303	
Honeywall Fault			E&W 123	
Honiton Fault			E&W 326	
Hook Green Fault			E&W 303	
Hooke Fault				BGS:BRG 15
Hope House Fault			E&W 12, E&W 13	
Hopton Fault			E&W 123	
Hopton Fault			E&W 139	
Hopwood Fault			E&W 183	
Horden Fault			E&W 27	
Horsebridge Fault	TQ 590112	East Sussex	E&W 319/334	
Horsehay Fault		Shropshire	E&W 152	Mem E&W 152/153
Horsforth - Tinhill Fault		Yorkshire	E&W 69	
Horsley Fault			E&W 125	
Horton Fault		Shropshire		Mem E&W 152/153
Hoton Fault				Smith et al. 2005
Howardian-Flamborough Fault				Brenchley & Rawson 2006
Howardian Hills Fault		Yorkshire		BGS:BRG 9
Hoyland Fault		Yorkshire	E&W 87	
Hucknall Fault			E&W 125	
Hunnington Fault		Warwickshire	E&W 168	
Hunstrete Fault		Somerset	E&W 280	
Huntley Fault		?	E&W 216	
Hurst Green Fault			E&W 304	
Huthwaite Fault			E&W 112	

=== I, J ===
Fault name	OS map ref	County/sea area	BGS map sheet	book reference/s
Ilkeston Fault			E&W 125	
Illingworth Fault		Yorkshire	E&W 77	
Ilmington Fault		Gloucestershire	E&W 217	
Ince Blundell Fault		Lancashire	E&W 83	
Ingwell Fault	NX 998140	Cumbria	E&W 28	
Inkberrow Fault		Gloucestershire	E&W 217	
Inkersall Fault			E&W 112	
Inksberrow - Haselor Hill Fault			UK (south) 625K	
Iron Acton Fault		Gloucestershire	Bristol Special 1"	
Ironville (Swanwick) Fault			E&W 125	
Irwell Valley Fault		Lancashire	E&W 85	
Isaac Gill Fault		Cumbria	E&W 38	
Isabella Fault		Northumberland	E&W 15	
Isfield Fault	TQ 446173	East Sussex	E&W 319/334	
Ivegill Fault		Cumbria	E&W 24	
Ivy House Fault		Lancashire	E&W 84	
Jackfield Fault		Shropshire		Mem E&W 152/153
James Pit Fault	NX 985178	Cumbria	E&W 28	
Jockey Bank Fault		Shropshire		Mem E&W 152/153
Johnby Fault		Cumbria	E&W 24, 30	

=== K ===
Fault name	OS map ref	County/sea area	BGS map sheet	book reference/s
Kaysbank Fault			E&W 12	
Keckwick Fault			E&W 97	
Keld Heads Vein			E&W 41	
Kellington Fault			E&W 78	
Kendal Fault		Cumbria		Brenchley & Rawson 2006, BGS:BRG 7
Keresley Fault		Warwickshire	E&W 169	
Kershope Fault			E&W 12	
Ketley Fault			E&W 153	Mem E&W 152/153
Kettlewell Fault		Cumbria	E&W 39	
Keys Fault		Irish Sea	Tect B&Ire 1:500K, E&W 47	
Kidney Hill Fault		Gloucestershire	Bristol Special 1", E&W 265	
Kilndown Fault			E&W 303, E&W 304	
King Street Fault			E&W 110	
King's House Fault		Gloucestershire	E&W 234	
Kingsley Fault				Smith et al. 2005
Kingsbridge Fault		Somerset		Webby, B.D. 1965
Kingswood Fault			E&W 153	
Kinlet Hall Fault			E&W 167	
Kirkburton Fault (north)		Yorkshire	E&W 77	
Kirkburton Fault (south)		Yorkshire	E&W 77	
Kirkby Fault		Cumbria	E&W 48	Brenchley & Rawson 2006, BGS:BRG 7
Kirkoswald Fault		Cumbria	E&W 24	
Kirkoswald North Fault		Cumbria	E&W 24	
Kirk Langley - Mackworth Fault			E&W 125	
Kirk Rigg Fault		Cumbria	E&W 30	
Knepp Castle Fault		Sussex	E&W 318/338	
Knock Pike Fault			E&W 24, 31	
Kyloe Fault			E&W 12	

=== L ===
Fault name	OS map ref	County/sea area	BGS map sheet	book reference/s
Lad Slack Fault		Cumbria	E&W 24	
Lake District Boundary Fault		Cumbria	E&W 37, E&W 47	Brenchley & Rawson 2006, BGS:BRG 7
Laithes Fault		Cumbria	E&W 24	
Lamb Leer Fault		Somerset	E&W 280	
Lampert Fault			E&W 12	
Langdale Fault		Cumbria	E&W 38	Brenchley & Rawson 2006
Langleyfield Fault		Shropshire		Mem E&W 152/153
Langton Fault		Durham	E&W 32	
Lask Edge Fault				Smith et al. 2005
Lawkland Fault			E&W 60	
Leacroft Fault			E&W 154	
Ledbury Fault		Herefordshire	E&W 216	BGS:BRG 11
Leegomery Fault			E&W 152	Mem E&W 152/153
Leighton Fault			E&W 281	
Leinthall Earl's Fault		Shropshire	E&W 181	Toghill P. 2006
Lemington Thrust		Gloucestershire	E&W 217	
Lepton Fault		Yorkshire	E&W 77	
Leva Green Fault			E&W 60	
Lickey End Fault			E&W 183	
Lidgett Fault		Yorkshire	E&W 87	
Lightmoor Fault		Shropshire	E&W 153	Toghill P. 2006
Lilleshall Fault				BGS:BRG 10
Lilyhurst Fault		Shropshire		Mem E&W 152/153
Limden Fault			E&W 303	
Limestone Fault		Shropshire		Mem E&W 152/153
Lindale Fault		Cumbria		Brenchley & Rawson 2006, BGS:BRG 7
Lindfield Fault			E&W 302	
Lions Bridge Fault		Lancashire	E&W 84	
Litherland Fault		Lancashire	E&W 83	
Little Stainton Fault	NZ 340204	Durham	E&W 33	
Little Wenlock Fault			E&W 152	Mem E&W 152/153
Lizard - Dodman - Start Thrust			UK (south) 625K	
Lloyd House Fault			E&W 167	
Lodge Fault		Shropshire		Mem E&W 152/153
Lofthouse Fault		Yorkshire	E&W 51	
Lofthouse Moor Fault		Yorkshire	E&W 51	
Long Meg Fault		Cumbria	E&W 24	
Longbridge Fault			E&W 183	
Longleat Fault		Wiltshire	E&W 281	
Longmynd (or 'Long Mynd') Scarp Fault		Shropshire	ChStret:25K	Toghill P. 2006, BGS:BRG 11
Longton Fault			E&W 123	
Longwood Fault		Yorkshire	E&W 77	
Lopen-Chiselborough-Coker Fault				BGS:BRG 15
Lounthwaite Fault		Cumbria	E&W 24	
Low Park Fault			E&W 12	
Lowcote Fault			E&W 125	
Lower Braggington Fault				Plant et al. 1999
Loweswater Thrust				Brenchley & Rawson 2006, BGS:BRG 7
Lowling Fault		Cumbria	E&W 23	
Lucas Grange Fault			E&W 302	
Luckington Fault		Somerset	E&W 281, Bristol Special 1"	
Lucy's Ledge Fault		Dorset	GA Guide22	
Ludcott Fault		Cornwall	E&W 348	
Lulsgate Fault		Gloucestershire	E&W 264	
Lulworth Crumple		Dorset		GA Guide22
Lunce's Common Fault		Sussex	E&W 318/338	
Lundhill Fault		Yorkshire	E&W 87	
Lunedale Fault		Durham	E&W 12, E&W 31, E&W 32	BGS:BRG 7
Lunedale - Staindrop Fault		Durham	E&W 32	
Lydbrook Fault		Gloucestershire	E&W 233	Mem E&W 233/250
Lydhurst Fault			E&W 302	
Lyneholmeford Fault Belt			E&W 12	
Lyth Valley Fault		Cumbria		Brenchley & Rawson 2006, BGS:BRG 7

=== M ===
Fault name	OS map ref	County/sea area	BGS map sheet	book reference/s
Mackworth Fault		Derbyshire	E&W 141	
Mackworth - Normanton Hills - Hoton Fault				Smith et al. 2005
Madeley Fault			E&W 123	
Madeley Fault			E&W 153	Mem E&W 152/153
Madeley Court Fault		Shropshire		Mem E&W 152/153
Maesbury Marsh - Grimpo Fault				Smith et al. 2005
Maidenhill Fault		Cumbria	E&W 24	
Mainstone Fault		Shropshire	E&W 165	Toghill P. 2006
Malmesbury Fault			E&W 251	
Malvern Fault				
Mangerton Fault		Dorset	E&W ??	Mem E&W 328etc, GA Guide 22
Manor House Fault		Dorset	E&W 341/2	
Maplehurst Fault			E&W 302	
Mapperley Fault			E&W 125	
Mapplewell Fault		Yorkshire	E&W 87	
Maresfield Fault			E&W 303	
Marksbury Fault		Somerset	E&W 281	
Marksbury Plain Fault		Somerset	E&W 280, E&W 281	
Marl Fault			E&W 98	
Marrick Great Vein			E&W 41	
Marsham Fault	TQ 860134	East Sussex	E&W 320/321	
Marske Fault			E&W 41	
Marston Fault		Somerset	E&W 281	
Martindale Fault		Cumbria	E&W 30	
Maryport Fault		Cumbria	E&W 22, E&W 23, Sc 6W	Brenchley & Rawson 2006, BGS:BRG 7
Maxstoke Fault		Warwickshire	E&W 168	
Mego's Linn Fault			E&W 7	
Melguards Fault		Cumbria	E&W 24	
Mells Fault			E&W 281	
Melton Wood Fault		Yorkshire	E&W 87	
Membury Fault			E&W 326	
Mere Fault			E&W 297, E&W 298	BGS:BRG 15
Mere Fault Complex			E&W 298	
Meriden Fault			E&W 183	
Merlin Fault			E&W 12	
Merriott-Hardington Fault			E&W 313	
Methley Junction Fault			E&W 78	
Methley Savile Fault			E&W 78	
Mewsgate Fault			E&W 12	
Middle Craven Fault		Yorkshire	E&W 60	
Middleton Grange Fault			E&W 78	
Milburn Fault		Cumbria	E&W 24, 30	
Milford Fault			E&W 281	
Millers House Fault			E&W 59	
Mill Place Fault			E&W 303	
Mint Fault		Cumbria		Brenchley & Rawson 2006, BGS:BRG 7
Mirfield Moor Fault		Yorkshire	E&W 77	
Miserden Fault		Gloucestershire	E&W 234	
Mitre Fault			E&W 154	
Mobberley Fault			E&W 110; 123	
Mockerkin Fault	NY	Cumbria	E&W 28	
Moira Fault		Derbyshire	E&W 141, 155 (x-sections)	
Money Close Lane Fault			E&W 59	
Monksilver Fault		Somerset		Webby, B.D. 1965
Monkton Farleigh Fault			E&W 265	
Moor Top Fault		Yorkshire	E&W 87	
Morcombe Fault		Gloucestershire	E&W 234	
Moreton Fault		Gloucestershire	E&W 217	
Morley Campsall Fault Zone		Yorkshire	E&W 77	
Morley-Campsall Fault		Yorkshire	E&W 69	
Moston Fault		Lancashire	E&W 85	
Mow Cop Fault			E&W 110	
Mudgley Fault		Somerset	E&W 280	
Muggleswick Fault		Durham	E&W 27	
Mullender Fault		Cumbria	E&W 30	
Murton Pike Fault			E&W 31	
Mutton Flat Fault		Yorkshire	E&W 87	

=== N ===
Fault name	OS map ref	County/sea area	BGS map sheet	book reference/s
Naddle Beck Fault		Cumbria	E&W 30	
Naish House Fault		Gloucestershire	E&W 264	
Napton Fault		Warwickshire	E&W 184	
Nedge Fault		Shropshire		Mem E&W 152/153
Neston Fault		Cheshire	E&W 96	
Netherseal Fault		Derbyshire	E&W 141, 155 (x-sections)	
New House Fault		Herefordshire	E&W 216	
New House Fault			E&W 12	
New Monkwray Fault	NX 995176	Cumbria	E&W 28	
New Tupton Fault			E&W 112	
Newbiggin Fault		Cumbria	E&W 24	
Newbottle Fault		Durham	E&W 21	
Newcastle Fault			E&W 123	
Newcastle Fault		Gloucestershire	E&W 233	
Newhouse Farm Fault			E&W 167	
Newton Fault		Somerset	E&W 265	
Newton Hanzard Fault	NZ 400274	Durham	E&W33	
Newton Reigny Fault		Cumbria	E&W 24	
Ninety Fathom Fault		Durham/Northumberland	E&W 15, 20, UK (north) 625K	BGS:BRG 7
Normannian Thrust		Western Approaches, Cornwall	Tect B&Ire 1:500K, E&W 353	
Normanton - Mackworth Fault		Derbyshire / Notts	E&W 141	Smith et al. 2005
Normanton Hills Fault			E&W 142	Smith et al. 2005
Norris Green Fault			E&W 97	
North Aston Fault			E&W 218	
North Brimpsfield Fault		Gloucestershire	E&W 234	
North Charlwood Fault			E&W 303	
North Don Fault		Yorkshire	E&W 87	
North Craven Fault		Yorkshire	E&W 50; 60	BGS:BRG 7
North Groombridge Fault			E&W 303	
North Hill Fault		Gloucestershire	E&W 264	
North Loscoe Fault			E&W 78	
North Mayfield Fault			E&W 303	
North Pontefract Fault			E&W 78	
North Powdermill Fault	TQ 790198	East Sussex	E&W 320/321	
North Upper Denton Fault			E&W 12	
Nottington Village Fault		Dorset	E&W 341/2	
Nunnery Fault		Cumbria	E&W 24	
Nuthurst Fault			E&W 302	

=== O ===
Fault name	OS map ref	County/sea area	BGS map sheet	book reference/s
Oakenclough Fault		Lancashire	E&W 67	
Oakengates Fault		Shropshire		Mem E&W 152/153
Oakwood Bottom Fault		Gloucestershire	E&W 233	
Ocean Edge Fault			E&W 59	
Old Forge Fault			E&W 303	
Old Stork Vein			E&W 41	
Old Town Fault	TQ 745083	East Sussex	E&W 320/321	
Oldham Edge Fault		Lancashire	E&W 85	
Olveston Fault		Gloucestershire		Mem E&W 233/250
Ore Fault	TQ 820107	East Sussex	E&W 320/321	
Orgate Fault			E&W 41	
Ormesby Fault		Durham	E&W 33 (inset map)	
Osmondthorpe Fault		Yorkshire	E&W 70; 78	
Oughterside Fault			E&W 22	
Oulton Fault			E&W 78	
Ouse Burn Fault		Durham	E&W 14	
Outer Silver Pit Fault		North Sea	Tect B&Ire 1:500K	
Outwood Fault		Lancashire	E&W 85	
Overseal Fault		Derbyshire	E&W 141 (x-section)	
Overton Fault			E&W 97; 109	
Oxfordshire Thrust			UK (south) 625K	

=== P, Q ===
Fault name	OS map ref	County/sea area	BGS map sheet	book reference/s
Paddockhurst Park Fault			E&W 302	
Padiham Fault		Lancashire	E&W 85	
Pallyards Fault			E&W 12	
Pannel Fault	TQ 870152	East Sussex	E&W 320/321	
Pardshaw Fault	NY	Cumbria	E&W 28	
Park Boundary Fault		Cumbria		BGS:BRG 7 (p197)
Park Fault		Cumbria	E&W 48	Brenchley & Rawson 2006, BGS:BRG 7
Park Farm Fault			E&W 302	
Park Gill Thrust		Cumbria	E&W 38	Brenchley & Rawson 2006
Park Hall Fault			E&W 100	
Parkgate Fault			E&W 125	
Parkhouse Fault			E&W 12	
Patshull Fault			E&W 153, E&W 167	
Pattingham Fault		Shropshire	E&W 153, E&W 167	Toghill P. 2006
Paulton Fault		Somerset	E&W 280	
Peak Fault		Yorkshire		BGS:BRG 9
Peasedown Fault		Somerset	Bristol Special 1"	
Peasmarsh Fault			E&W 304	
Peckforton Fault			E&W 109	
Pemberton Fault		Lancashire	E&W 84	
Pendle Fault		Lancashire	E&W 69	
Pendleton Fault		Greater Manchester & Cheshire	E&W 85	
Penhurst Fault	TQ 707163	East Sussex	E&W 320/321	
Pennine Fault			E&W 24	
Pennine Fault System				BGS:BRG 7
Pennine Fault Zone		Cumbria	E&W 30	
Penny Hill Thrust		Worcestershire	Guide Geol. of Martley	
Pennyquick Fault		Somerset	Bristol Special 1", E&W 265	
Penrith Fault		Cumbria	E&W 24	
Penton Linns Fault			E&W 12	
Pentrich Fault			E&W 125	
Petty France Fault			E&W 251	
Pewsey Fault			Tect B&Ire 1:500K	
Pikeburn Fault			E&W 12	
Pilstye Farm Fault			E&W 302	
Pinhay Fault			E&W 326	
Plumgarth Fault		Cumbria	E&W 39	
Plymouth Bay Fault		Cornwall	E&W 353	
Pock Fault		Shropshire	ChStret:25K	
Polesworth Fault		Warwickshire	E&W 155, E&W 169	Smith et al. 2005
Pontesford Linley Fault		Shropshire	E&W 151; 165	Toghill P. 2006
Pontesford Linley Fault System		Shropshire	E&W 151; 165	Brenchley & Rawson 2006
Pontesford Linley Fault Zone		Shropshire		BGS:BRG 11
Porters Barn Fault			E&W 125	
Portland - Wight Fault				
Portledge Fault		Devon	E&W 292	
Portnadler Fault		Cornwall	E&W 348, E&W 353	
Portsdown - Middleton Fault				
Portwrinkle Fault		Cornwall	E&W 348, E&W 353	
Poyntington Fault			E&W 313	Mem E&W 328etc
Preston - Moreton Fault			UK (south) 625K	
Preston Brook Fault			E&W 97	
Prewley Fault		Devon	E&W 324	
Priddy Fault		Somerset	E&W 280	
Primrose Hill Fault			E&W 109	
Princethorpe Fault		Warwickshire	E&W 184	
Purbeck Fault		Dorset	E&W 342/3	Mem E&W 328etc, GA Guide 22
Putnam Fault		Cumbria	E&W 24	
Quarndon Fault			E&W 125	
Quarry Hill Fault			E&W 22	
Quernmore Fault			E&W 59	

=== R ===
Fault name	OS map ref	County/sea area	BGS map sheet	book reference/s
Radford Fault			E&W 218	
Radstock Slide Fault		Somerset	E&W 281, Bristol Special 1"	
Rainford Fault		Lancashire	E&W 84	
Rake Head - Soil Hill Fault		Yorkshire	E&W 77	
Randley Fault		Shropshire		Mem E&W 152/153
Rawthey Fault		Cumbria	E&W 39, 50	Brenchley & Rawson 2006, BGS:BRG 7
Red Rock Fault			E&W 123	BGS:BRG 10
Red Rock Fault*		Lancashire	E&W 84	
Redacre Gill Fault		Cumbria	E&W 38	
Redhill Fault		Shropshire		Mem E&W 152/153
Redway Head Vein			E&W 41	
RF Hollintree Fault?		Yorkshire	E&W 50	
Richmond Fault			E&W 41	
Ridgehill Fault		Gloucestershire	E&W 264, E&W 280	
Ridgeway Fault		Dorset		BGS:BRG 15, GA Guide22
Ridgeway Fault		Gloucestershire		Mem E&W 233/250
Ridgeway Fault		Somerset	Bristol Special 1"	
Ridgeway Thrust			E&W 264	
Ripponden-Slaithwaite Fracture		Yorkshire	E&W 77	
Rishworth-Stainland Fault Zone		Yorkshire	E&W 77	
Rising Sun Fault		Northumberland	E&W 15	
Riva Fault		Yorkshire	E&W 69	
Rivock Fault		Yorkshire	E&W 69	
Roaring Meg Fault			E&W 97	
Rockrobin Fault			E&W 303	
Rodge Hill Thrust		Worcestershire	Guide Geol. of Martley	
Rollright Fault			E&W 218	
Roman Fell Fault			E&W 31	
Romsley Fault			E&W 167	
Rookery Fault		Shropshire		Mem E&W 152/153
Rosgill Moor Fault		Cumbria	E&W 30	
Rosset Ghyll Fault		Cumbria	E&W 38	Brenchley & Rawson 2006
Rotherfield Fault			E&W 303	
Rough Cleugh Fault			E&W 13	
Rough Grain Fault			E&W 12	
Roughton Gill Fault		Cumbria	E&W 23	Brenchley & Rawson 2006
Round Hill Fault		Somerset	E&W 280	
Roundhay Park Fault		Yorkshire	E&W 70	
Rousdon Fault			E&W 326	
Rudgehill Fault		Somerset	E&W 281	
Runcorn Fault			E&W 97	
Rudge End Fault				BGS:BRG 11
Rusey Fault Zone		Cornwall	E&W 322	
Rushy Lee Fault			E&W 59	
Russell's Hall Fault		Warwickshire	E&W 167, E&W 168	Smith et al. 2005
Ryhope Fault		Durham	E&W 21	

=== S ===
Fault name	OS map ref	County/sea area	BGS map sheet	book reference/s
Salcombe Mouth Fault			E&W 326	
Saltholme Fault	NZ 480242	Durham	E&W 33	
Sandford Fault			E&W 218	
Sandhurst Fault			E&W 304	
Sandon Fault			E&W 123	
Sandrocks Fault			E&W 302	
Sandyford Fault			E&W 125	
Sart Boundary Fault		Devon	E&W 355/6	
Sayers Common Fault		Sussex	E&W 318/338	
Scalderskew Fault		Cumbria	E&W 23	
Scalehow Fault		Cumbria	E&W 30	
Scaynes Hill Fault			E&W 302	
Sceugh Fault		Cumbria	E&W 24	
Scot Lane Fault		Lancashire	E&W 84	
Scratchmillscar Fault		Cumbria	E&W 24	
Seacombe Fault		Cheshire	E&W 96	
Seaham Fault		Durham	E&W 21	
Seaton Fault			E&W 326	
Seaton Carew Fault	NZ 400280	Durham	E&W 27, E&W 33	
Seaton Sluice Fault		Northumberland	E&W 15	
Sedbergh Fault			E&W 39	Brenchley & Rawson 2006, BGS:BRG 7
Sedgefield Fault	NZ 335270	Durham	E&W 27, E&W 33	
Sedgewick Fault			E&W 302	
Severn Valley Fault Belt			E&W 151	Toghill P. 2006
Severn Valley Faults			UK (south) 625K	
Shafton Fault		Yorkshire	E&W 87	
Sharnberry Fault			E&W 26	
Sharpstones Thrust			E&W 166; ChStret:25K	
Shaw Hill Fault			E&W 78	
Shaw Street Fault		Lancashire	E&W 96	
Sheepwash Fault			E&W 98	
Sheffield Fault			E&W 100	
Sheffield Forest Fault			E&W 303	
Shelton Fault			E&W 123	
Shelvock Fault				Smith et al. 2005
Shepherd Crag Fault		Cumbria	E&W 23	
Shevington Fault		Lancashire	E&W 84	
Shibden Head Fault		Yorkshire	E&W 77	
Shipwreck Fault		Lancashire	E&W 85	
Shopford Fault			E&W 12	
Shortwood Fault		Gloucestershire	Bristol Special 1"	
Shut End Fault			E&W 167	
Siddick Fault			E&W 22	
Sidley Fault	TQ 743094	East Sussex	E&W 320/321	
Sidnye Farm Fault			E&W 302	
Sidway Fault			E&W 123	
Sigurd Fault Zone		Irish Sea	E&W 23	
Sileby Fault		Derbyshire, Leicestershire	E&W 141, E&W 142, E&W 156	
Sileby - Thringstone Fault				Smith et al. 2005
Silverlands Fault			E&W 303	
Skelsmergh Fault		Cumbria	E&W 39	Brenchley & Rawson 2006, BGS:BRG 7
Skelton Fault		Cumbria	E&W 24	
Sleeches Fault			E&W 303	
Smalley Fault			E&W 125	
Smeer Hall Fault			E&W 59	
Snape Fault			E&W 303	
Soar Fault		Leicestershire	E&W 156	
South Brimpsfield Fault		Gloucestershire	E&W 234	
South Charlwood Fault			E&W 303	
South Craven Fault		Yorkshire	E&W 50; 60	
South Crich Fault				Smith et al. 2005
South Groombridge Fault			E&W 303	
South Loscoe Fault			E&W 78	
South Mayfield Fault			E&W 303	
South Pontefract Fault			E&W 78	
South Powdermill Fault	TQ 800192	East Sussex	E&W 320/321	
Southern Overthrust		Somerset	E&W 281, Bristol Special 1"	
South-western Overthrust		Somerset	E&W 280	
Spa Fault			E&W 100	
Spink Hall Fault		Yorkshire	E&W 87	
Spout House Fault		Shropshire		Mem E&W 152/153
Spy Rigg Fault			E&W 12	
St Arvans Fault		Gloucestershire		Mem E&W 233/250
St Briavels Fault		Gloucestershire	E&W 233	Mem E&W 233/250
St Catherine's Fault		Lancashire	E&W 84	
St Helen's Fault		Yorkshire	E&W 87	
St Hilda Fault		Northumberland	E&W 15	
Staincliffe Fault		Yorkshire	E&W 77	
Stainmore Summit Fault			E&W 31	
Stakeford Fault		Durham	E&W14, 15	
Standerwick Fault		Somerset/Wiltshire	E&W 281	
Stanton Fault			E&W 125, E&W 126	
Stanton Prior Fault		Somerset	Bristol Special 1"	
Stapenhill Fault			E&W 167	
Station Fault			E&W 167	
Stauvin Fault			E&W 59	
Sticklepath - Lustleigh Fault		Devon		Brenchley & Rawson 2006
Sticklepath Fault		Devon	E&W 292, 350	
Sticklepath Fault Zone		Devon	E&W 348	BGS:BRG 15
Stillington Fault	NZ 400245	Durham	E&W 33	
Stiperstones Fault			E&W 165	
Stock Hill Fault		Somerset	E&W 280	
Stockdale Fault		Yorkshire	E&W 50	
Stockdale Thrust		Cumbria	E&W 38	Brenchley & Rawson 2006
Stocking Farm Fault		Shropshire		Mem E&W 152/153
Stockton Fault		Shropshire		Mem E&W 152/153
Stockton Fault			E&W 298	
Stockwell Fault		Gloucestershire	E&W 234	
Stodmarsh Fault		Kent	E&W 289	
Stoke Gifford Fault		Gloucestershire	E&W 264	
Stoke Pound Fault			E&W 183	
Stone Cross Fault		Cumbria		BGS:BRG 7
Stone Cross Fault	TQ 624046	East Sussex	E&W 319/334	
Stone Farm Fault			E&W 302	
Stonehurst Fault			E&W 303	
Stonesty Gill Fault		Cumbria	E&W 138	
Stoneyhill Fault			E&W 152	Mem E&W 152/153
Stow Thrust		Gloucestershire	E&W 217	
Stranger Fault		Lancashire	E&W 84	
Strawmoor Fault			E&W 153	
Strelley Fault			E&W 125	
Stubbs Lane Fault			E&W 78	
Stublick Fault				BGS:BRG 7
Stublick-Ninety Fathom Fault System				BGS:BRG 7; Trewin (ed) 2002
Stutteron Fault		Yorkshire	E&W 70	
Summerground Fault		Cumbria	E&W 24	
Sutton Fault			E&W 112	
Sutton Maddock Fault		Shropshire		Mem E&W 152/153
Swaintley Hill Fault			E&W 59	
Swallowcroft Fault			E&W 123	
Sweethope Fault		Durham	E&W 13	BGS:BRG 7
Swerford Fault			E&W 218	
Swindale Fault Zone		Cumbria	E&W 30	
Swindale Beck Fault			E&W 31	
Swindon Fault		Northumberland		BGS:BRG 7
Swynnerton Fault			E&W 123	
'Symon Fault'				Smith et al. 2005; BGS:BRG 10
Symondsbury Fault				Mem E&W 328etc

=== T ===
Fault name	OS map ref	County/sea area	BGS map sheet	book reference/s
Tadwick Fault		Somerset	E&W 265	
Tantobie Fault		Durham	E&W 27	
Tanyard Fault	TQ 805152	East Sussex	E&W 320/321	
Teesdale Fault		Durham	E&W 31	
Thirlmere Fault		Cumbria		Brenchley & Rawson 2006
Thistleton Fault, Cumbria		Cumbria	E&W 37	
Thistleton Fault, Lancashire		Lancashire	E&W 67	Brenchley & Rawson 2006
Thornhill Fractures		Yorkshire	E&W 77	
Thornthwaite Fault			E&W 31	
Thorpe Hesley Fault or Tankersley Fault		Yorkshire	E&W 87	
Thringstone Fault		Leicestershire	E&W 141, 155	Smith et al. 2005; BGS:BRG 10
Thrope Edge Fault		Yorkshire	E&W 51	
Througham Fault		Gloucestershire	E&W 234	
Thrupe Fault		Somerset	E&W 280	
Thurcroft Fault			E&W 100	
Thurstaston Fault		Cheshire	E&W 96	
Thwaite Farm Fault			E&W 78	
Ticehurst Fault			E&W 304	
Tickenham Fault		Gloucestershire	E&W 264	
Timberscombe Fault System		Somerset		Webby, B.D. 1965
Timsbury Fault		Somerset	E&W 280, E&W 281	
Tinker Hole Fault		Lancashire	E&W 84	
Tintern Fault		Gloucestershire		Mem E&W 233/250
Tinwell Fault				BGS:BRG 10
Tinwell-Marholm Fault			E&W 157	
Tipton and Hilltop Fault		Warwickshire	E&W 168	
Titterstone Clee Fault		Shropshire	E&W 166	Brenchley & Rawson 2006; Toghill P. 2006
Todholes Fault			E&W 12	
Todridge Fault		Durham	E&W 14	
Tong Fault		Yorkshire	E&W 69; 77	
Totterton Fault			E&W 165	
Trench Fault		Shropshire		Mem E&W 152/153
Trouble House Fault			E&W 251	
Troutbeck Fault		Cumbria	E&W 39	Brenchley & Rawson 2006
Troutbeck Fault System		Cumbria		Brenchley & Rawson 2006, BGS:BRG 7
Trowbridge Fault		Wiltshire	E&W 281	
Tunbridge Wells Fault			E&W	
Turnditch Fault			E&W 125	
Turners Hill Fault			E&W 302	
Tynwald Fault Zone			E&W 47	

=== U, V ===
Fault name	OS map ref	County/sea area	BGS map sheet	book reference/s
Ullcoats Fault		Cumbria		BGS:BRG 7 (p197)
Ulleskelf Fault		Yorkshire	E&W 70	
Ullswater Fault		Cumbria	E&W 30	
Unthank Fault		Cumbria	E&W 24	
Upholland Fault		Lancashire	E&W 84	
Upsall Fault		Durham	E&W 33 (inset map)	
Usworth Fault		Durham	E&W 21	
Vale of Pickering Fault			UK (north) 625K, E&W 53	
Veryan Thrust		Cornwall	E&W 352, E&W 353	
Vigo Fault			E&W 154	

=== W ===
Fault name	OS map ref	County/sea area	BGS map sheet	book reference/s
Waberthwaite Fault		Cumbria		Brenchley & Rawson 2006
Walsgrove Hill Fault		Worcestershire	Guide Geol. of Martley	
Walton Fault		Yorkshire	E&W 70	
Wappenshall Fault			E&W 152	Mem E&W 152/153
Warleigh Fault			E&W 265	
Warminster Fault		Wiltshire	E&W 281, 297	
Warren Plantation Fault		Cumbria	E&W 24	
Warrensway Fault		Shropshire		Mem E&W 152/153
Warton Fault				Smith et al. 2005
Warwick Fault		Warwickshire	E&W 184	
Watch Hill Fault		Cumbria		Brenchley & Rawson 2006
Watch Hill Thrust		Cumbria	E&W 23	Brenchley & Rawson 2006, BGS:BRG 7
Water Haigh Fault			E&W 78	
Watergate Fault			E&W 22	
Waterhead Fault			E&W 12	
Waterloo Fault			E&W 97	
Watleyhirst Fault			E&W 12	
Watson Fault		Yorkshire	E&W 87	
Waver Fault		Cumbria	E&W 23	
Waver - Warnell Fell - Sebergham Fault		Cumbria	E&W 23	
Waverbank Fault		Cumbria	E&W 23	
Waverton Fault			E&W 109	
Waxhill Fault		Shropshire		Mem E&W 152/153
Wayside Fault		Shropshire		Mem E&W 152/153
Weare Fault		Somerset	Ched:25K	
Weaverthorpe Fault			E&W 53	
Wedmore Fault		Somerset	E&W 280	
Weecher Fault		Yorkshire	E&W 69	
Wellington Fault			E&W 152	Mem E&W 152/153
Welsh Borderland Fault				Smith et al. 2005
Welsh Borderland Fault System			UK (south) 625K	Brenchley & Rawson 2006
Wem - Bridgemere - Red Rock Fault				Smith et al. 2005
Wem - Bridgemere - Red Rock Fault System				Smith et al. 2005
Wem - Prees Fault		Shropshire		Toghill P. 2006
Wem - Red Rock Fault System				Brenchley & Rawson 2006
Wem Fault			E&W 123; 151	BGS:BRG 10
Wentworth Fault		Yorkshire	E&W 87	
West End Fault		Gloucestershire	E&W 264	
West Hartlepool Fault	NZ 450309	Durham	E&W 27	
West Manchester Fault		Lancashire	E&W 85	
West Moor North Fault		Durham	E&W14, 15	
West Moor South Fault		Durham	E&W 14, 15	
Western Boundary Fault			E&W 75	
Western Boundary Fault (another)		Warwickshire	E&W 167, 168, 169, 184	
Weston Fault			E&W 97	
Weston Mouth Fault			E&W 326	
Wham Fault		Durham	E&W 32	
Wharfe Valley Fault		Yorkshire	E&W 70	
Wharleycroft Fault			E&W 31	
Whenby Fault			E&W 53	
Whichford Fault			E&W 218	
Whickhope Fault			E&W 13	
Whickhope Linn Fault			E&W 12	
Whillan Beck Fault		Cumbria	E&W 38	BGS:BRG 7
Whitaside Vein			E&W 41	
White Rock Fault	TQ 815094	East Sussex	E&W 320/321	
Whitechurch-Berne Fault				Mem E&W 328etc
Whitecliffe Fault		Gloucestershire	E&W 233	
Whitefaced Fault		Gloucestershire	E&W 264	
Whitfield Fault		Gloucestershire	Bristol Special 1"	
Whitmore Fault			E&W 123	
Whitnash Fault		Warwickshire	E&W 184	
Whydown Fault	TQ 700098	East Sussex	E&W 320/321	
Wigglesworth Fault		Durham	E&W 32	
Wight - Bray Fault		Isle of Wight	Tect B&Ire 1:500K	
Willowmoor Fault		Shropshire		Mem E&W 152/153
Willsbridge Fault		Gloucestershire	Bristol Special 1"	
Willstone Hill Thrust		Shropshire	ChStret:25K	
Wilmington Fault			E&W 326	
Wilting Fault	TQ 772110	East Sussex	E&W 320/321	
Windy Gap Fault		Cumbria	E&W 24	
Winnington Fault			E&W 109	
Winnow Thrust		Cumbria		Brenchley & Rawson 2006
Winsford Fault			E&W 109	
Winterborne Fault				BGS:BRG 15
Winterburn Fault			E&W 60	
Winterfield Fault		Somerset	E&W 280, E&W 281	
Winwick Fault			E&W 97	
Witham Friary Fault			E&W 297	
Withyham Fault			E&W 303	
Wivelsfield Fault		Sussex	E&W 318/338	
Woldringfold-Crabtree Fault			E&W 302	
Wollescote Fault			E&W 167	
Woodchurch Fault		Cheshire	E&W 96	
Woodlands Fault			E&W 143	
Woodsfold Fault		Lancashire	E&W 67, E&W 75	
Woof Crag Fault		Cumbria		BGS:BRG 7
Woolhope Fault		Worcestershire	E&W 215	
Worsley Fault		Lancashire	E&W 85	
Worth Hall Fault			E&W 98	
Wortley Hall Fault		Yorkshire	E&W 87	
Wrekin Fault		Shropshire	E&W 152	Toghill P. 2006; Mem E&W 152/153
Wrington Hill Fault		Gloucestershire	E&W 264	
Wullstone Hill Thrust			E&W 166	
Wychbury Hill Fault			E&W 167	
Wyke Fault		Shropshire		Mem E&W 152/153
Wynford Fault				Mem E&W 328etc
Wythes Fault			E&W 12	

=== X, Y, Z ===
Fault name	OS map ref	County/sea area	BGS map sheet	book reference/s
Yanley Fault		Gloucestershire	E&W 264	
Yanwath Fault		Cumbria	E&W 30	
Yarlside Fault		Lancashire	E&W 58	
Yewtree Bank Fault		Shropshire	E&W 166; ChStret:25K	
Yokecliffe Fault			E&W 125	

== See also ==
- List of geological faults of Northern Ireland
- List of geological faults of Scotland
- List of geological faults of Wales
- List of geological folds in Great Britain
- Geological structure of Great Britain
