= Disturbance (geology) =

Linear zone of disturbed rock strata

In geology, a disturbance is a linear zone of disturbed rock strata stretching for many miles across country which comprises a combination of folding and faulting. The British Geological Survey record a number of such features in South Wales including the Neath Disturbance, Pontyclerc Disturbance, Carreg Cennen Disturbance and the Cribarth Disturbance, the latter sometimes also known (at least in part) as the Tawe Valley or Swansea Valley Disturbance. The southwestward continuation of the Carreg Cennen Disturbance is known as the Llandyfaelog Disturbance.

Other examples in Wales and the border counties of England include the Clun Forest, Saron, Trimsaran and Llannon (or 'Llanon') disturbances. The Silverdale and Burtreeford disturbances are found in northern England.

== List of disturbances ==
The following named features comprise both faulting and folding;

Sortable table of named disturbances
Disturbance name	County	Country	BGS map sheet	book reference/s
Burtreeford Disturbance		England	E&W 19, 31	
Caerbryn Disturbance	Carmarthenshire	Wales	E&W 230	
Carreg Cennen Disturbance		Wales	E&W 230	
Clun Forest Disturbance	Shropshire	England	E&W 165	BGS memoir sheet 165
Cribarth Disturbance		Wales	E&W 230, 231	
Llandyfaelog Disturbance	Carmarthenshire	Wales	E&W 231	
Llannon (or Llanon) Disturbance	Carmarthenshire	Wales	E&W 230	
Neath Disturbance		Wales	E&W 231	
Pontyclerc Disturbance	Carmarthenshire	Wales	E&W 230	
Saron Disturbance	Carmarthenshire	Wales	E&W 230	
Silverdale Disturbance		England	E&W 25	
Stockdale Disturbance		England		GCR29, p205
Trimsaran Disturbance		Wales		

== See also ==
- List of geological folds in Great Britain
