= Central Belt =

Demographic area of highest population density in Scotland

Coordinates: 55.951°N 3.863°W

- Area
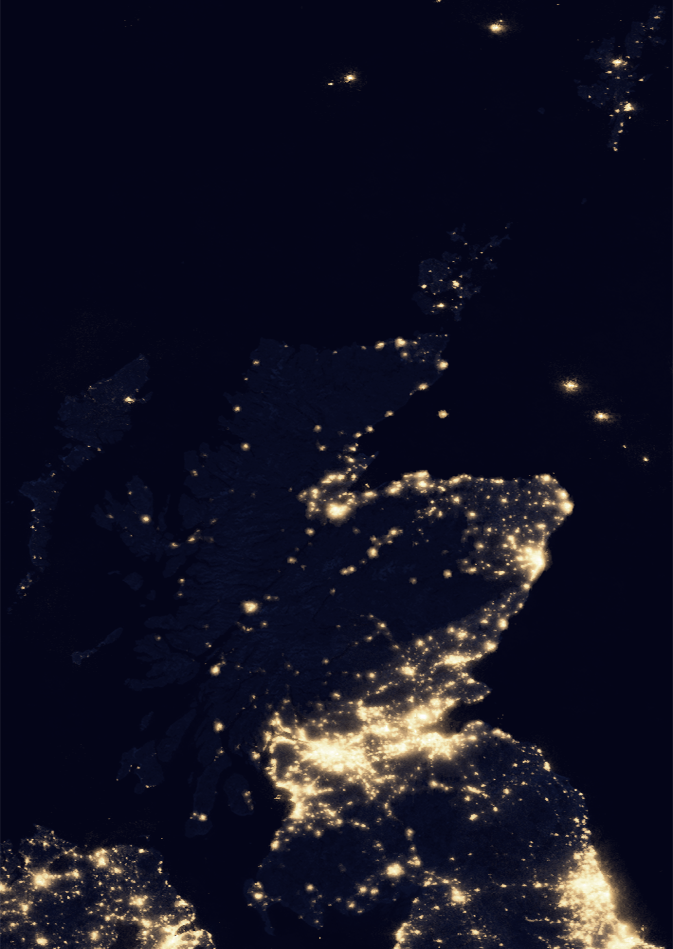
- A 2012 night image of Scotland from space, displaying a pattern of concentrated light from habitation across the Central Belt

- Location within Scotland
- OS grid reference: NS 83764 74675
- Country: Scotland
- Sovereign state: United Kingdom

The Central Belt of Scotland is the area of highest population density within Scotland. Although it has no official boundaries, the area is generally considered to consist of Scotland's two largest cities, Edinburgh and Glasgow, and many towns and cities in their surrounding areas: Ayrshire, Clackmannanshire, Dunbartonshire, Fife, Inverclyde, Lanarkshire, the Lothians and Stirlingshire; though some inclusions are debated. Depending on definition, the area's population ranged from 2.39 million to 4.28 million in 2018, constituting an approximate 44% or 78% of Scotland's population that year.

Despite its name, it is not geographically central (Note: The geographical centre of Scotland lies far to the north of the modern population heartlands. Various locations have been suggested including White Bridge on the B846 east of Schiehallion and a site near the village of Newtonmore in Badenoch.) but is nevertheless at the "waist" of Scotland on a conventional map. The term "central" is used in many local government, police, and NGO designations. It was formerly known as the Midlands or Scottish Midlands, but this term has fallen out of fashion. The Central Belt lies between the Highlands to the north and the Southern Uplands to the south.

In the early 21st century, predictions were made that due to economic migration indicators, the urban areas of Glasgow and Edinburgh, whose centres are approximately 41 miles (66 km) apart, could merge to create a megalopolis over the coming decades.

== Smaller Central Belt ==
Cartogram of the Central Belt depicting the populations of its constituent local authorities, contrasting with its area which is far smaller than the sparsely-populated areas to its north and south

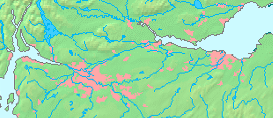
The Central Belt area with urban areas (pink), including Glasgow to the west and Edinburgh to the east

The area is often considered as the triangle defined by the M8, M80 and M9 motorways stretching from Greenock and Glasgow in the west to Edinburgh in the east, and has been referred to as the Lowland Triangle. encompassing towns such as Paisley, Cambuslang, Hamilton, Stirling, Falkirk, Cumbernauld, Livingston and Bathgate. The population of the local authority areas which are wholly within this territory and have no extensive unpopulated areas (Note: West Dunbartonshire, Renfrewshire, East Renfrewshire, East Dunbartonshire, Glasgow, North Lanarkshire, Falkirk, West Lothian, Edinburgh and Midlothian.) was approximately 2.39 million in 2018.

== Larger Central Belt ==
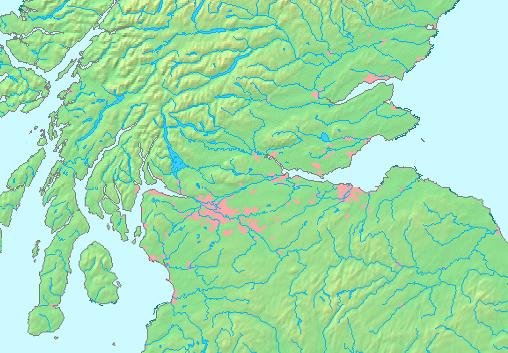
The larger Central Belt area with urban areas (pink), including Ayrshire in the south-west and Tayside to the north-east

The larger Central Belt is a trapezoid, not precisely defined, but essentially encompassing the generally low-lying areas from Helensburgh to Montrose (the Highland Boundary Fault) and from Girvan to Dunbar (the Southern Uplands Fault). This also takes in fairly densely populated regions such as Ayrshire and East Lothian, and encompasses all the major cities of Scotland, except for Aberdeen and Inverness which are located in the north of the country, as well as the bulk of Scotland's industrial works. Including rural parts of the council areas involved, (Note: Argyll & Bute, Inverclyde, North Ayrshire, South Ayrshire, East Ayrshire, South Lanarkshire, Fife, East Lothian, Stirling, Perth & Kinross, Dundee and Angus - 1.89 million, plus the 'smaller belt'.) the total population was around 4.28 million in 2018.

== Similar terms ==
There are several terms in common usage in a Scottish context with a similar meaning to "Central Belt".

- The Central Lowlands is geologically defined and covers an area that stretches further to the north east than the Central Belt.
- The "Midland Valley" is a less commonly used expression synonymous with "Central Lowlands".
- The Scottish Lowlands are topographically and culturally defined and include all of Scotland outside of the Highlands and Islands, including the Southern Uplands.
- Central Scotland is a less well-defined term used to mean various things, including "Central Lowlands" and "Central Belt".

== See also ==
- The Centre of Scotland
- Dublin–Belfast corridor – population 3.3 million
