= Carreg Cennen Disturbance =

Fault zone in Wales

The Carreg Cennen Disturbance is a zone of geological faults and folds in south and mid Wales which forms a part of both the Church Stretton Fault Zone and the Welsh Borderland Fault System. To the southwest it is known as the 'Llandyfaelog Disturbance'.

These structures which stretch from Pembrokeshire to Shropshire are thought to have originated during the Caledonian Orogeny or mountain-building period.

== Influence on the landscape ==
It is most impressively revealed at Carreg Cennen itself where the mediaeval castle sits perched atop a 90m cliff of Carboniferous Limestone which is caught up within a faulted block sitting between two arms of the Disturbance. It is probably also responsible for the alignment of the Afon Cennen to the west of this location where the river follows the line of the fault for over 2.5 mi / 4 km.

== The Caledonian Orogeny ==
The Carreg Cennen Disturbance is one of the more southerly geological features within Britain which can be described as following the Caledonoid trend. The phrase describes a suite of major northeast-southwest oriented geological structures associated with the closure of the former Iapetus Ocean in the middle Palaeozoic era and giving rise to the Caledonian Orogeny. The Neath Disturbance and the Cribarth Disturbance are similar features also found in south Wales. The Bala Fault, Menai Strait Fault, Southern Uplands Fault, Highland Boundary Fault and Great Glen Fault are other major Caledonoid structures of Britain.

== See also ==
- Cwm Llwyd Fault runs south from the Disturbance to near Brynaman
