= Cribarth Disturbance =

Geological structure in south Wales

The Cribarth Disturbance is a geological structure forming a lineament which stretches across south Wales from Swansea up the Swansea Valley then northeastwards to Brecon and beyond. It consists of both a series of faults and associated folds which were active during the mountain-building period known as the Variscan orogeny. This line of weakness probably featured in the earlier Caledonian Orogeny and perhaps reflects a more ancient line of weakness in the basement rocks. It is also known (in part) as the Tawe Valley Disturbance or the Swansea Valley Disturbance.

== Influence on the landscape ==
The Disturbance is responsible for a number of significant landscape features along its 50 km length. Prominent amongst these is the Swansea Valley, formed both by glacial action during the ice ages and river erosion along this line of weakness in the Earth's crust between Abercraf and Swansea. It is now occupied by the River Tawe. The geologically complex mountain of Cribarth also lies on the Disturbance and indeed gives its name to the feature.

== The Caledonian Orogeny ==
The Cribarth Disturbance is one of the southernmost geological features within Britain which can be described as following the Caledonoid trend. The phrase describes a suite of major northeast-southwest oriented geological structures associated with the closure of the former Iapetus Ocean in the middle Palaeozoic Era and giving rise to the Caledonian Orogeny or mountain-building period. The Neath Disturbance and the Carreg Cennen Disturbance are similar features also found in south Wales. The Bala Fault, Menai Strait Fault, Southern Uplands Fault, Highland Boundary Fault and Great Glen Fault are other major Caledonoid structures of Britain.
