= List of geological faults of Scotland =

This is a list of the named geological faults in Scotland. See the main article on faults for a fuller treatment of fault types and nomenclature but in brief, the main types are normal faults, reverse faults, thrusts, thrust faults or slides and strike-slip faults. Many faults may have acted as both normal faults at one time and as reverse or thrust faults at another and may or may not have also incorporated some degree of strike-slip movement too. The terms 'zone' and 'complex' imply collections of features with associated histories.

== Key to tables ==
- Column 1 indicates the name of the fault. Note that different authors may use different names for the same fault or a section of it. Conversely, the same name may be applied to more than one fault, particularly in the case of smaller faults which are widely separated.
- Column 2 indicates the OS grid reference of the approximate midpoint of certain faults. Note that the mapped extent of a fault may not accurately reflect its actual extent.
- Column 3 indicates the county in which the fault occurs. Some traverse two or more counties of course.
- Column 4 indicates on which sheet, if any, of the British Geological Survey's 1:50,000 / 1" scale geological map series of Scotland, the fault is shown and named (either on map/s or cross-section/s or both). A handful of BGS maps at other scales are listed too.
- Column 5 indicates a selection of publications in which references to the fault may be found. See references section for full details of publication.

== Alphabetical list of faults ==
=== A ===
| Fault name | OS map ref | County | BGS map sheet | book reference/s |
|---|---|---|---|---|
| Abbey Craig Fault | | | Sc 39E | |
| Achininver Thrust | | Sutherland | Sc 114E | |
| Achness Thrust | | | 108W | |
| A'Chruach Slide | | Argyll and Bute | Sc 12 | |
| Aithbank Fault | | Shetland | Sc 131 | |
| Allt Mhainister Slide | | | Sc 63E | |
| Alwinton Fault | | | | BGS:BRG 7 |
| Annathill Fault | | | Sc 31W | |
| Aonach Beag Slide | | | Sc 63E | |
| Archer Beck Fault | | | Sc 11 | |
| Archerfield Fault | | East Lothian | Sc 33, 41 | ELGA |
| Ardross Fault | | | Sc 41 | |
| Arisdale Fault | | Shetland | Sc 130 | |
| Arkletonshiels Fault | | | Sc 11 | |
| Arnaboll Thrust | | Sutherland | Sc 114W | BGS:BRG 2, G & K 2011 |
| Arndean Fault | | | Sc 39E | |
| Arnton Fault | | | Sc 11 | |
| Assapol Fault | | | | BGS:BRG 3; Trewin (ed) 2002 |
| Auchmillan Fault | | | Sc 14E | |
| Aultnagoire Fault | | | Sc 73E | |
| Avonbridge Fault | | | Sc 31E | |

=== B ===
| Fault name | OS map ref | County | BGS map sheet | book reference/s |
|---|---|---|---|---|
| Balcormo Fault | | | Sc 40E | |
| Balgrummo Fault | | | Sc 40E | |
| Baligill Fault | | | Sc 115W | |
| Ballumbie Fault | | | Sc 49 | |
| Balmacara Thrust | | | Sc 71E | BGS:BRG 2 |
| Balmae Burn Fault | | Kirkcudbrightshire | Sc 5W | |
| Banff Fault | | | | |
| Banknock Fault | | | Sc 31E | |
| Bankend Fault | | | Sc 15W | |
| Bargany Fault | | | Sc 8W, Sc 14W | |
| Bealach Traligill Fault | | Sutherland | Assynt (Special 50K) | G & K 2011 |
| Bedda Fault | | | Sc 11 | |
| Beinn an Fhuarain Thrust | | | | G & K 2011 |
| Beinn Bhan Thrust | | | Sc 27 | |
| Beinn Uidhe Thrust | | | | G & K 2011 |
| Belhelvie Fault | | | Sc 77 | |
| Ben Earb Slide | | | Sc 56W | |
| Ben Hope Thrust | | Sutherland | Sc 108W, Sc 114W, Sc 114E | Trewin (ed) 2002 |
| Ben Hutig Thrust | | Sutherland | Sc 114E | |
| Ben More Thrust | | Sutherland | Sc 101E, Sc 114W | BGS:BRG 2; Trewin (ed) 2002, G & K 2011 |
| Ben Oss Fault | | | | Trewin (ed) 2002 |
| Ben Suardal Thrust | | | Sc 71W | BGS:BRG 3 |
| Benderloch Slide | | Argyll | Sc 45W, Sc 53W | |
| Berriedale Fault | | | Sc 110 | |
| Bervie Bay Fault | | | Sc 67 | |
| Birkshaw Fault | | | Sc 10W | |
| Blairquhan Fault | | | Sc 14W | |
| Blargie Slide | | | Sc 63E | |
| Blarmore Fault | | | Sc 115E | |
| Bloody Bush Fault | | | Sc 11 | |
| Bluemull Sound Fault | | Shetland | Sc 130 | |
| Bonahaven Fault | | | Sc 27 | |
| Bolsa Fault | | | Sc 27 | |
| Boundary Slide | | | | Trewin (ed) 2002 |
| Branxton Fault | | | Sc 40E, Sc 41 | |
| Bridge of Balgie-Loch Garry Fault | | | Sc 54E | |
| Bridge of Forss Fault Zone | | | Sc 115E | |
| Brims - Risa Fault | | Shetland | | BGS:BRG 1 |
| Bring Fault | | Orkney | Orkney Islands (Special 100K) | |
| Brodick Bay Fault | | | | Trewin (ed) 2002 |
| Buckhaven Fault | | | Sc 40E | |
| Burnturk Fault | | | Sc 40E | |
| Burrance Fault | | | Sc 10W | |
| Bush Fault | | | Sc 10W, Sc 11 | |

=== C ===
| Fault name | OS map ref | County | BGS map sheet | book reference/s |
|---|---|---|---|---|
| Cairn Muir Fault | | | Sc 32W | |
| Cairngarroch Fault | | | | Trewin (ed) 2002 |
| Cairnholy Fault | | Kirkcudbrightshire | Sc 4E, Sc 5W | |
| Calder Fault | | | Sc 32W | |
| Calder-Murieston Fault | | | | Trewin (ed) 2002 |
| Caledonian Front Thrust Belt | | | | BGS:BRG 2 |
| Cam Loch Thrust | | Sutherland | Assynt (Special 50K), Sc 101E | G & K 2011 |
| Camasunary Fault | | | | BGS:BRG 2 & 3; Trewin (ed) 2002 |
| Camasunary-Rona Fault | | | | Trewin (ed) 2002 |
| Camasunary Skerryvore Fault | | Sc 71W | Skye Central Complex Bedrock 25k | |
| Cambret Fault | | Kirkcudbrightshire | Sc 4E, Sc 5W | |
| Campsie Fault | | | Sc 31W | Trewin (ed) 2002 |
| Camster Fault | | | Sc 110, Sc 116W | |
| Camregan Fault | | | Sc 8W | |
| Carcow Fault | | Sc 8E, Sc 15W, Sc 15E | | Trewin (ed) 2002 |
| Carmacoup Fault | | | Sc 15W | |
| Carnock Fault | | | Sc 39E | |
| Carrick Fault | | | Sc 14W | |
| Carronbridge Fault | | | Sc 9E | |
| Cassingray Fault | | | Sc 40E | |
| Castlehill Fault | | | Sc 30W & pt 29E | |
| Central fracture zone | | North Sea | | |
| Centre Main Ring Fault (Rum) | | | Sc 60 | |
| Ceres Fault | | | Sc 40E, Sc 41 | |
| Chasm Faults | | Argyll | Glencoe:25K | |
| Clarkston Fault | | | Sc 22E | |
| Clatto Fault | | | Sc 40E | |
| Cloncaird Fault | | | Sc 14W | |
| Cnoc nan Uamh Thrust | | | | G & K 2011 |
| Cloch Fault | | | Sc 30W & pt 29E | |
| Coigach Fault | | Sutherland | Tect B&Ire 1:500K, Sc 101W, Sc 107W | |
| Coire Sgoir Slide | | | Sc 54E | |
| Comedie Fault | | | Sc 31W | |
| Conagleann Fault | | | Sc 73E | |
| Cooms Fault | | | Sc 11 | |
| Corloch Fault | | | | BGS:BRG 3 |
| Coul Fault | | | Sc 40E | |
| Cove Fault | | Scottish Borders | Sc 33E | BGS:BRG 6 |
| Cowden's Fault | | | Sc 10W | |
| Craig Liath Fault | | | Sc 64W | |
| Creagan Liatha Fault | | | Sc 63E | |
| Creich Thrust | | | Sc 93E | |
| Cronksbank Fault | | | Sc 11 | |
| Crooked Pool Fault | | | Sc 11 | |
| Crossgatehall Fault | | East Lothian | UK (north) 625K | Trewin (ed) 2002, ELGA |
| Cue Sike Fault (*also 'Cue Sike Shatter Belt') | | | *Sc 11 | Trewin (ed) 2002 |

=== D ===
| Fault name | OS map ref | County | BGS map sheet | book reference/s |
|---|---|---|---|---|
| Dalton Fault | | | Sc 10W | |
| Dalmellington Fault | | | Sc 14E | Trewin (ed) 2002 |
| Dane's Dike Fault | | | Sc 41 | |
| Darleith Fault | | | Sc 30W & pt 29E | |
| Dechmont Fault | | | Sc 31W | |
| Dee Fault | | | Sc 66E, Sc 77 | |
| Dennyloanhead Fault | | | Sc 31E | |
| Devil's Staircase Fault | | | Glencoe:25K | |
| Dherue Thrust | | Sutherland | Sc 108E, Sc 114E | Trewin (ed) 2002 |
| Dogger Bank Fault Zone | | North Sea | | |
| Dog Track Fault | | | Sc 115E | |
| Doune Thrust | | | Sc 8W | |
| Dove Cove Fault | | | Sc 7, Sc 8W | Trewin (ed) 2002 |
| Drummarkie Fault | | | Sc 84W | |
| Drummuir Faults | | | Sc 85E | |
| Drumbreddan Bay Fault | | | Sc 3 | |
| Drynie Fault | | | Sc 84W | |
| Dunbar - Gifford Fault | | Lothian | UK (north) 625K; Sc 24E, Sc 32E & Sc 33 | Trewin (ed) 2002, ELGA |
| Dupin Thrust | | | Sc 8W | |
| Dura Den Fault | | | Sc 40E, Sc 41, Sc 49 | |
| Durie Fault | | | Sc 40W, Sc 41 | |
| Durris House Fault | | | Sc 66E | |
| Dusk Water Fault | | | Sc 22W & pt21E | Trewin (ed) 2002 |

=== E ===
| Fault name | OS map ref | County | BGS map sheet | book reference/s |
|---|---|---|---|---|
| East Glenfalloch Fault | | | Sc 46W | |
| East Ochil Fault | | | Sc 40E | Trewin (ed) 2002 |
| East Saltcoats Fault | | | Sc 31E | |
| East Scapa Fault | | Orkney | Orkney Islands (Special 100K) | BGS:BRG 1 |
| Eilrig Thrust (also as 'Eilrig Thrust Zone') | | | Sc 63W | |
| Eller Fault | | | Sc 15W, Sc 15E | |
| Enthorn Fault | | | Sc 11 | |
| Ericht - Laidon Fault (*also as Ericht-Laiden Fault') | | | Sc 46W, *Sc 54E, Sc 63E, Sc 64W, Sc 74W, Sc 74E | Trewin (ed) 2002 |
| Ettleton Fault | | | Sc 11 | |
| Ettrick Valley Fault | | | | Trewin (ed) 2002 |

=== F ===
| Fault name | OS map ref | County | BGS map sheet | book reference/s |
|---|---|---|---|---|
| Fairlie Glen Fault | | Ayrshire | Sc 22W & pt21E | |
| Farchal Fault | | | Sc 65E | |
| Fardingmullach Fault | | | Sc 8W, Sc 8E, Sc 9W, Sc 15W, Sc 15E, Sc 24E | Trewin (ed) 2002 |
| Fealar Fault | | | Sc 64E | |
| Fergus Slide | | | Sc 56W | |
| Fernie Fault | | | Sc 40E | |
| Findhorn Fault | | | Sc 84W | |
| Findon Fault | | | Sc 96E | |
| Firth of Forth Fault | | | Tect B&Ire 1:500K | Trewin (ed) 2002 |
| Flannan Thrust | | | | BGS:BRG 2 |
| Fort William Slide | | | Sc 62E | |

=== G ===
| Fault name | OS map ref | County | BGS map sheet | book reference/s |
|---|---|---|---|---|
| Gallaton Fault | | | Sc 67 | |
| Garabal Fault | | | | Trewin (ed) 2002 |
| Garabal Hill Fault | | | Sc 46W | |
| Garheugh Fault | | Kirkcudbrightshire | Sc 4W, Sc 4E, Sc 5W | |
| Garlieston Fault | | Kirkcudbrightshire | Sc 4E, Sc 5W | |
| Garnkirk Fault | | | Sc 31W | |
| Garthna Geo Fault | | Shetland | | BGS:BRG 1; Trewin (ed) 2002 |
| Gartness Fault | | | Sc 30W & pt 29E | |
| Gie Usig Geo Fault | | | Sc 115E | |
| Gillespie Burn Fault | | Kirkcudbrightshire | Sc 3, Sc 4W, Sc 4E, Sc 5W, Sc 9W, Sc 15E | |
| Gillhall Fault | | | Sc 10W | |
| Gilnockie Fault | | Dumfries-shire | Sc 11 | BGS:BRG 7 |
| Glaik Fault | | | | Trewin (ed) 2002 |
| Gleann Charnan Fault | | Argyll | Glencoe:25K | |
| Gleann Liath Fault | | | Sc 73E | Trewin (ed) 2002 |
| Gleghornie Fault | | ?Lothian | Sc 33E | |
| Glen App Fault | | | Sc 3, Sc 7, Sc 8W | Trewin (ed) 2002 |
| Glen Banchor Fault | | | Sc 64W | |
| Glen Cleuch Fault | | | Sc 11 | |
| Glen Docherty Fault | | | Sc 82E | |
| Glen Doll Fault | | | Sc 65E | |
| Glen Etive Fault | | Argyll | Glencoe:25K | |
| Glen Creran Slide | | Argyll | Sc 45W, Sc 53W | |
| Glen Fumart Fault | | | Sc 8E, Sc 9W, Sc 9E, Sc 15E | Trewin (ed) 2002 |
| Glen Rinnes Fault | | | Sc 85E | |
| Glen Stockdale Slide (*also as 'Glenstockdale Slide') | | Argyll | Sc 45W, *Sc 53W | |
| Glen Strae Fault | | | Sc 45E | |
| Glen Truim Fault (also as 'Glen Truim Fault Zone') | | | Sc 64W | |
| Glencoul Thrust | | Sutherland | Assynt (Special 50K) | BGS:BRG 2; Trewin (ed) 2002, G & K 2011 |
| Glenkiln Fault | | | Sc 10W | |
| Glenmuir Fault | | | Sc 15W | |
| Glenreif Shatter Belt | | | Sc 11 | |
| Glenure Slide | | | Sc 53W | |
| Grampian Slide | | | | Trewin (ed) 2002 |
| Grassfield Fault | | | Sc 24E | |
| Great Glen Fault (also as 'Great Glen Fault Zone') | | | UK (north) 625K, Sc 53W, Sc 62E, Sc 63W, Sc 64W, Sc 72E, Sc 73E | Trewin (ed) 2002 |

=== H ===
| Fault name | OS map ref | County | BGS map sheet | book reference/s |
|---|---|---|---|---|
| Haggrister Fault | | Shetland | Sc 129 | |
| Harbour Hill Fault | | Lothian | Sc 32E | |
| Harelawhill Fault | | | Sc 11 | |
| Headmark Fault | | | Sc 14 | |
| Heatherfield Fault | | | Sc 31E | |
| Heck's Burn Fault | | | Sc 11 | |
| Helmsdale Fault | | Sutherland, Ross-shire | UK (north) 625K, Sc 103W | BGS:BRG 2; Trewin (ed) 2002 |
| Hermitage Fault | | | Sc 11 | |
| Highland Boundary Fault (also as 'Highland Boundary Fault Zone') | | | UK (north) 625K, Sc 12, Sc 38E, Sc 39W, Sc 56W, Sc 66W, Sc 66E, Sc 67 | Trewin (ed) 2002 |
| Hog Wash Fault | | | Sc 11 | |

=== I, J ===
| Fault name | OS map ref | County | BGS map sheet | book reference/s |
|---|---|---|---|---|
| Inchgottrick Fault (or Inchgotrick Fault) | | | Sc 14W, Sc 22W & pt21E, Sc 22E | Trewin (ed) 2002 |
| Inchkeith Fault | | | Sc 32E | |
| Innerwell Fault | | Kirkcudbrightshire | Sc 4E, Sc 5W, Sc 5E, Sc 9E | |
| Innerwick Fault | | Berwickshire, East Lothian | Sc 33E | ELGA |
| Inner Main Ring Fault (Rum) | | | Sc 60 | |
| Inninmore Fault | | | | BGS:BRG 3 |
| Inverkip Fault | | | Sc 30W & pt 29E | |
| Invernaver Fault | | | Sc 115W | |
| Inverpattack Fault | | | Sc 63E | |
| Inverpattack-Margie Fault | | | Sc 54E | |

=== K ===
| Fault name | OS map ref | County | BGS map sheet | book reference/s |
|---|---|---|---|---|
| Kennox Fault | | | Sc 15W | Trewin (ed) 2002 |
| Keppoch Fault | | | Sc 30W & pt 29E | |
| Kerse Loch Fault | | | Sc 8W, Sc 14W, Sc 14E | Trewin (ed) 2002 |
| Kershope Fault | | | Sc 11 | |
| Kilbarchan Fault | | | Sc 30W | |
| Kilchrenan Slide | | Argyll | Sc 45W | |
| Kildonan Slide | | Argyll and Bute | Sc 12 | |
| Killantringon Fault (or Killantringan Fault*) | | | Sc 4W | Trewin (ed) 2002* |
| Kilbarchan Fault | | | Sc 30W & pt 29E | |
| Killiecrankie Slide | | | Sc 55W | |
| Killin Fault | | | | Trewin (ed) 2002 |
| Kincardine Ferry Fault | | | Sc 31E | |
| Kingledores Fault | | | | Trewin (ed) 2002 |
| Kinloch Thrust | | | Sc 108E | |
| Kinlochewe Thrust | | | | BGS:BRG 2 |
| Kinnaird House Fault | | | Sc 31E | |
| Kinnoull Fault | | | Sc 48W | |
| Kintail Thrust | | | | BGS:BRG 2 |
| Kirk Hill Fault | | | Sc 11 | |
| Kishorn Thrust | | | Sc 71W, Sc 81E | BGS:BRG 2 & 3 |
| Kishorn-Suardal Thrust | | | | Trewin (ed) 2002 |
| Knockinculloch Fault | | | Sc 14W | |
| Knocklaugh Fault | | | Sc 8W | |
| Knoydart Thrust | | | | Trewin (ed) 2002 |

=== L ===
| Fault name | OS map ref | County | BGS map sheet | book reference/s |
|---|---|---|---|---|
| Laig Gorge Fault | | | Sc 60 | BGS:BRG 3 |
| Lamb Hoga Fault | | Shetland | Sc 131 | |
| Lambdoughty Fault | | | Sc 14W | |
| Lammermuir Fault | | East Lothian | UK (north) 625K; Sc 24E, Sc 32E & Sc 33 | Trewin (ed) 2002, BGS:BRG 6, ELGA |
| Largs Fault Zone | | | Sc 30W & pt 29E | |
| Langlee Fault | | | Sc 15W | |
| Largs-Hunterston Fault Zone | | Ayrshire | Sc 22W & pt21E | |
| Latheron Fault | | | Sc 110 | |
| Lathones Fault | | | Sc 41 | |
| Laurieston Fault | | Kirkcudbrightshire | Sc 4W, Sc 4E, Sc 5W, Sc 5E, Sc 9E, Sc 10W | Trewin (ed) 2002 |
| Laurieston - Moffat Valley Fault | | | | BGS:BRG6ednIV |
| Leadhills Fault | | | Sc 8W, Sc 8E, Sc 9W, Sc 15W, Sc 15E, Sc 24E | Trewin (ed) 2002, BGS:BRG6ednIV |
| Leven Fault | | | Sc 40E | |
| Liddel Water Fault | | | Sc 11, Sc 17E | |
| Little Loch Broom Fault | | | Sc 101W | |
| Littlemill Fault (also as 'Little Mill Fault') | | | Sc 14W, Sc 14E | |
| Loch an Daimh Thrust | | | Sc 101E | |
| Loch Assapol Fault | | | | BGS:BRG 3 |
| Loch Assynt Fault | | | | G & K 2011 |
| Loch Awe Fault | | | Sc 45E | |
| Loch Calder Fault | | | Sc 115E, Sc 116W | |
| Loch Gruinart Fault (also as 'Loch Gruniart Fault') | | | Sc 27 | Trewin (ed) 2002 |
| Loch Maree Fault | | | Sc 91/100 | BGS:BRG 2 |
| Loch Mhor Fault North | | | Sc 73E | |
| Loch Mhor Fault South | | | Sc 73E | |
| Loch Morie Fault | | | | BGS:BRG 2 |
| Loch Mudle Fault | | | Sc 51E | BGS:BRG 3 |
| Loch Ryan Fault | | | Sc 3 | Trewin (ed) 2002 |
| Loch Screapadal Fault | | | | BGS:BRG 3 |
| Loch Seaforth Fault | | | | BGS:BRG 2 |
| Loch Skerrols Thrust (also 'Loch Skerrols Shear Zone') | | Argyll | Sc 27, Sc 36, Sc 37W, Sc 37E | Trewin (ed) 2002 |
| Loch Tay Fault | | | UK (north) 625K, Sc 55W, Sc 64E | Trewin (ed) 2002 |
| Lochan Riabhach Thrust | | Sutherland | Sc 114W, Sc 114E | G & K 2011 |
| Lochanhead Fault | | | Sc 9E | |
| Lochmaben Fault | | | Sc 10W | |
| Lochwood Fault | | | Sc 10W | |
| Long Loch Fault | | | Sc 60 | BGS:BRG 3 |
| Lucklaw Hill Fault | | | Sc 49 | |
| Lugton Water Fault | | | Sc 22E | |
| Lussa Slide | | Argyll and Bute | Sc 12 | |
| Lynn of Lorn Fault | | | | BGS:BRG 3 |

=== M ===
| Fault name | OS map ref | County | BGS map sheet | book reference/s |
|---|---|---|---|---|
| Maiden Rock Fault | | | Sc 49 | |
| Maidens Fault | | | Sc 14W | |
| Main Ring Fault | | | | BGS:BRG 3 |
| Markie Fault | | | Sc 63E, Sc 73E, Sc 74W | |
| Maryland Fault | | | Sc 30W & pt 29E | |
| Mashie Fault | | | Sc 63E | |
| Meetlaw Fault | | | Sc 66E, Sc 67 | |
| Melby Fault | | Shetland | Tect B&Ire 1:500K; Sc 129 | BGS:BRG 1; Trewin (ed) 2002 |
| Mid Cleuch Fault | | | Sc 11 | |
| Middleton Hall Fault | | | Sc 32W | |
| Middleton Muir Fault | | | Sc 56W | |
| Milngavie-Kilsyth Fault | | | Sc 30E, Sc 31W | |
| Minch Fault | | | | BGS:BRG 2; Trewin (ed) 2002 |
| Mochrum Fault | | | Sc 4W | |
| Moffat Valley Fault | | | | Trewin (ed) 2002 |
| Moine Thrust (also as 'Moine Thrust Zone') | | | Sc 43N, Sc 71W, Sc 71E, Sc 81E, Sc 101E, Sc 108W, Sc 114E | BGS:BRG 2; Trewin (ed) 2002, G & K 2011 |
| Moncreiffe Fault | | | Sc 48W | |
| Mons Craig Fault | | | Sc 67 | |
| Morroch Bay Fault | | | Sc 4W | Trewin (ed) 2002 |
| Mossbog Fault | | | Sc 14E | |
| Mosspaul Shatter Belt | | | Sc 11 | |
| Mountbenger Burn Fault | | | Sc 24E | |
| Muirhouse Fault | | | Sc 31E | |
| Muirshiel Fault | | | Sc 30W & pt 29E | |
| Mull Slide | | Argyll and Bute | Sc 12 | |
| Mumbie Fault | | | Sc 11 | |
| Mundole Fault | | | Sc 84E | |
| Mungal Fault | | | Sc 31E | |
| Mursieston Fault | | | Sc 32W | |

=== N ===
| Fault name | OS map ref | County | BGS map sheet | book reference/s |
|---|---|---|---|---|
| Naver Slide | | | | BGS:BRG 2 |
| Naver Thrust | | | Sc 102E, Sc 108E, Sc 114E, Sc 115W | Trewin (ed) 2002, G & K 2011 |
| Nesting Fault | | Shetland | Sc 128; 129; 130 | Trewin (ed) 2002 |
| Newton Fault | | | Sc 49 | |
| North Esk Fault | | | Sc 66W, Sc 66E | |
| North Inchmurrin Fault | | | Sc 30W & pt 29E | |
| North Inverkip Fault | | | Sc 30W | |
| North Scapa Fault | | Orkney | Orkney Islands (Special 100K) | BGS:BRG 1 |
| North Solway Fault | | Dumfries-shire | | BGS:BRG 7, BGS:BRG6ednIV, Mem Sc 5W, 5E & pt6W |
| North Tay Fault | | | Sc 48W, Sc 48E | |
| Northeastern Graben Fault Zone | | Argyll | Glencoe:25K | |

=== O ===
| Fault name | OS map ref | County | BGS map sheet | book reference/s |
|---|---|---|---|---|
| Ochil Fault | | | Sc 39W, Sc 39E | Trewin (ed) 2002 |
| Ochiltree Fault | | | Sc 32W | |
| Orchardhead Fault | | | Sc 31E | |
| Orlock Bridge Fault (*also as 'Orlock Bridge Fault Zone') | | Galloway | Sc 3, Sc 4W, *Sc 4E, Sc 8E, Sc 9W, Sc 9E, Sc 15E, Sc 24E | BGS:BRG6ednIV |
| Ormond Fault | | | Sc 84W | |
| Ossian Fault | | Argyll | Glencoe:25K | |
| Outer Hebrides Fault (also as 'Outer Hebrides Fault Zone') | | | Tect B&Ire 1:500K | Trewin (ed) 2002 |
| Outer Hebrides Thrust Zone | | | | BGS:BRG 2 |
| Outer Isles Fault Zone | | | | Trewin (ed) 2002 |
| Outer Isles Thrust | | | UK (north) 625K | Trewin (ed) 2002 |
| Outer Main Ring Fault (Rum) | | | Sc 60 | |
| Oykell Thrust | | | | G & K 2011 |

=== P, Q ===
| Fault name | OS map ref | County | BGS map sheet | book reference/s |
|---|---|---|---|---|
| Paisley Ruck | | | Sc 30E, Sc 30W&pt29E | |
| Pass of Brander Fault | | | Sc 45E, Sc 53W | |
| Pentland Fault | | | | Trewin (ed) 2002 |
| Pibble Fault | | | Sc 4W, Sc 4E, Sc 15E | |
| Pittenweem Fault | | | Sc 41 | |
| Pobie Fault | | North Sea | Tect B&Ire 1:500K | |
| Port Glasgow Fault | | | Sc 30W & pt 29E | |
| Port Logan Fault | | | Sc 3 | |
| Prentice Fault | | | Sc 14E | |
| Pyet Thrust | | | Sc 8W | Trewin (ed) 2002, BGS:BRG6ednIV |
| Quarry Fault | | | Sc 84W | |
| Queen's Cairn Fault | | Argyll | Glencoe:25K | |

=== R ===
| Fault name | OS map ref | County | BGS map sheet | book reference/s |
|---|---|---|---|---|
| Radernie Fault | | | Sc 41 | |
| Raegill Fault | | | Sc 11 | |
| Raicastle Fault | | | Sc 84E | |
| Ranachan Hill Slide | | Argyll and Bute | Sc 12 | |
| Rashshiel Fault | | | Sc 11 | |
| Reidh-choire Fault | | | Sc 54E | |
| Rosemarkie Fault | | | Sc 84W | |
| Risa Fault | | Orkney | Orkney Islands (Special 100K) | |
| Rosneath Fault | | | Sc 30W & pt 29E | |
| Ross Bay Fault | | Kirkcudbrightshire | Sc 5W | |
| Rothes Fault | | | Sc 85E, Sc 95 | Trewin (ed) 2002 |
| Rowanburn Fault | | | Sc 11 | |
| Rubha Garbh Slide | | Argyll | Sc 45W | |

=== S ===
| Fault name | OS map ref | County | BGS map sheet | book reference/s |
|---|---|---|---|---|
| Sandhead Fault | | | Sc 3, Sc 4W, Sc 4E, Sc 15E | |
| Sandside Bay Fault | | | Sc 115E | |
| Sandy Craig Fault | | | Sc 41 | |
| Sangobeg Fault | | Sutherland | | Trewin (ed) 2002 |
| Sanquhar Fault | | | Sc 15W | |
| Scapa Fault | | | | Trewin (ed) 2002 |
| Screapadal Fault | | | Sc 81W | BGS:BRG 3 |
| Sgurr Beag Slide | | | Sc 62W | BGS:BRG 2; Trewin (ed) 2002 |
| Sgurr Beag Thrust | | | UK (north) 625K, Sc 83W, Sc 93W | Trewin (ed) 2002 |
| Shetland Spine Fault | | Shetland | | |
| Shettleston Fault | | | Sc 31W | |
| Skerryvore Fault | | | | BGS:BRG 3; Trewin (ed) 2002 |
| Skinsdale Thrust | | | Sc 109W | |
| Skipper's Bridge Fault | | | Sc 11 | |
| Slamannan Fault | | | Sc 31E | |
| Sligo Fault | | | Sc 84W | |
| Sole Thrust | | Sutherland | Sc 114W | BGS:BRG 2; Trewin (ed) 2002, G & K 2011 |
| South Inchmurrin Fault | | | Sc 30W & pt 29E | |
| South Inverkip Fault | | | Sc 30W & pt 29E | |
| South Tay Fault | | | Sc 48W, Sc 48E, Sc 49 | |
| Southern Upland Fault | | | Sc 8E, Sc 14E, Sc 15W, Sc 15E, Sc 24W, Sc 24E | BGS:BRG 6, BGS:BRG6ednIV |
| Southwestern Graben Fault Zone | | Argyll | Glencoe:25K | |
| Spittalfield Fault | | | Sc 48W, Sc 56W | |
| Sronlairig Fault (*also as 'Sron Lairig Fault') | | | UK (north) 625K, Sc 63W, Sc 73E, Sc 74W, *Sc 84E | |
| St Flanan Fault | | | Sc 31W | |
| Stair Fault | | | Sc 14E | |
| St Ann's Fault | | | Sc 10W | |
| Stair Haven Fault | | | Sc 4W, Sc 4E, Sc 9W | |
| Stinchar Valley Fault (*also as 'Stinchar Valley Fault Zone') | | | Sc 7, Sc 8W | Trewin (ed) 2002 |
| Straiton Fault | | Ayrshire | Sc 14W | |
| Straiton Fault | | Angus | Sc 49 | |
| Stralochy Fault | | | Sc 48W | |
| Strandfoot Fault | | | Sc 3 | |
| Strath Fleet Fault (*also as 'Strathfleet Fault') | | | *Sc 102E | BGS:BRG 2 |
| Strath Naver Slide | | | | BGS:BRG 2 |
| Strathconon Fault | | | Sc 71E, Sc 82E, Sc 83W | BGS:BRG 2; Trewin (ed) 2002 |
| Strathglass Fault | | | Sc 72E, Sc 83W | Trewin (ed) 2002 |
| Strathy Bay Fault | | | Sc 115W | |
| Strath Halladale Fault | | | Sc 115W, Sc 115E | |
| Strath of Appin Fault | | | Sc 53W | |
| Struie Thrust | | | Sc 93E | |
| Succoth Fault | | | Sc 85E | |
| Sulma Water Fault | | Shetland | | BGS:BRG 1 |
| Swordly Thrust | | Sutherland | Tect B&Ire 1:500K, Sc 108E, Sc 109W, Sc 115W | Trewin (ed) 2002 |

=== T ===
| Fault name | OS map ref | County | BGS map sheet | book reference/s |
|---|---|---|---|---|
| Tamond Fault | | | Sc 11 | |
| Tarras Fault | | | Sc 11 | |
| Tarskavaig Thrust | | | Sc 71W | BGS:BRG 2 & 3 |
| Teasses Fault | | | Sc 40E | |
| The Hooies Fault | | | Sc 3 | |
| Thorlieshope Fault | | | Sc 11, Sc 17E | |
| Thornton Fault | | | Sc 48W | |
| Tinwald Fault | | | Sc 10W | |
| Toddy Bridge Fault | | | Sc 40E | |
| Tor Linn Fault | | | Sc 10W | |
| Tormitchell Thrust | | | Sc 8W | |
| Tollie Farm Fault | | Sutherland | Sc 91/100 | |
| Torrisdale Thrust | | | Sc 108E, Sc 114E | Trewin (ed) 2002 |
| Traligill Thrust | | | | G & K 2011 |
| Tyndrum Fault | | | Sc 45E, Sc 54E | Trewin (ed) 2002 |

=== U, V ===
| Fault name | OS map ref | County | BGS map sheet | book reference/s |
|---|---|---|---|---|
| Uamh an Tartair Thrust | | | | G & K 2011 |
| Ullapool Thrust | | | Sc 101E | G & K 2011 |

=== W-Z ===
| Fault name | OS map ref | County | BGS map sheet | book reference/s |
|---|---|---|---|---|
| Walls Boundary Fault | | Shetland | Sc 128; 129 | BGS:BRG 1; Trewin (ed) 2002 |
| Wamphray Fault | | East Lothian | Sc 33, 41 | ELGA |
| Waterbeck Fault | | | Sc 10W | BGS:BRG6ednIV |
| West Glenfalloch Fault | | | Sc 46W | |
| West Ochil Fault | | | | Trewin (ed) 2002 |
| Whistleberry Fault | | | Sc 67 | |
| Whita Well Fault | | | Sc 11 | |
| Wick Fault | | | Tect B&Ire 1:500K | Trewin (ed) 2002 |
| Woodhaven Fault | | | Sc 49 | |

== See also ==
- List of geological folds in Great Britain
- Geological structure of Great Britain
