= Neath Disturbance =

Geological structure in Great Britain

The Neath Disturbance is a geological structure which stretches across south Wales from Swansea Bay northeastwards as far as Hereford in western England. It consists of a series of both faults and associated folds which were active during the mountain-building period known as the Variscan orogeny. This line of weakness probably featured in the earlier Caledonian Orogeny and perhaps reflects a more ancient line of weakness in the basement rocks.

The Disturbance gives rise to a lineament crossing the region, that is to say that it is responsible for a number of significant landscape features along its 100 km length. Prominent amongst these is the Vale of Neath, a deep valley incised by a glacier during the ice ages along this line of weakness in the Earth's crust and now occupied by the River Neath between Pontneddfechan and Swansea Bay. The hill of Moel Penderyn also lies on the Disturbance a little further east. A part of the Vale of Grwyne north of The Sugarloaf and the northeast-southwest aligned section of the Monnow valley on the English/Welsh border are also excavated along this line of weakness.

The Neath Disturbance is possibly the southernmost geological feature within Britain which can be described as following the Caledonoid trend. The phrase describes a suite of major geological structures associated with the closure of the former Iapetus Ocean in the middle Palaeozoic Era and giving rise to the Caledonian orogeny or mountain-building period. The Cribarth or Swansea Valley Disturbance and the Carreg Cennen Disturbance are similar features found a little further north in south Wales. The Bala Fault, Menai Strait Fault, Southern Uplands Fault, Highland Boundary Fault and Great Glen Fault are other major Caledonoid structures of Britain.
