= Central Scotland =

Central Scotland may refer to:

- Central Belt, the area of highest population density in Scotland, also known as the "Midlands" or "Scottish Midlands"
- Central Lowlands, a geologically defined area of relatively low-lying land in southern Scotland
- Central Scotland (Scottish Parliament electoral region), one of the eight electoral regions of the Scottish Parliament
- Central Region, Scotland, a local government region of Scotland 1975-1996
- Centre of Scotland, the geographical centre of Scotland, located in the Highlands

== See also ==
- Scottish Lowlands
