= Cwm Llwyd Fault =

Geological fault in Great Britain

Coordinates: 51°50′21″N 3°52′22″W

The Cwm Llwyd Fault is a fault in the west of the Black Mountain of South Wales. It runs north, parallel to the A4069 road, for over 4 km from near Brynaman to meet the Carreg Cennen Disturbance near Brest Cwm Llwyd. It moved as a sinistral (left lateral) strike-slip fault during the Variscan Orogeny. Together with the Llwyn Celyn Fault it formed a left-stepping offset that created a pull apart structure, which preserved the Cwm Llwyd Outlier of Namurian rocks.

== Description ==
The Cwm Llwyd Fault is a steep, north-to-south-trending fracture that slices through the Black Mountain escarpment near Nant Oesglyn in Carmarthenshire, Wales. It separates older Devonian and Dinantian limestones on its east from progressively younger Namurian sandstones and shales on its west, giving a total vertical mismatch (known to geologists as throw) of roughly 200–225 m where the fault crosses the escarpment. Field mapping shows that displacement increases north-wards, so that below the mountain road the Lower Limestone Shale is dropped against much older Old Red Sandstone; south-wards, the sense of movement fades out. Because the rocks on either side stand nearly vertical at the fault contact, the structure acts like a wall, and the stream of Nant Oesglyn exploits the resulting line of weakness to carve a narrow gorge.

Although many Welsh faults are drawn as simple cracks on maps, detailed work on the Cwm Llwyd Fault reveals it is one strand in a small pull-apart system created by sideways (strike-slip) movements during the Variscan mountain-building episode around 300 million years ago. The key clue is a left-stepping overlap between the Cwm Llwyd Fault and the parallel Llwyn Celyn Fault 200 m to the east; where the two overlap, the ground between them dropped out to form a narrow, trench-like hollow (a graben). This sunken strip now preserves the Cwm Llwyd Outlier—an isolated mass of soft Namurian "Middle Shales". Because the shales are far less resistant than the surrounding sandstones and limestones, they have been whittled into a conspicuous grassy re-entrant in the otherwise craggy Black Mountain face, making the fault zone easy to pick out in the landscape.

The fault's importance lies in the insight it gives into the later tectonic history of South-West Wales. Petrographic and weathering evidence from the outlier suggest the fracture system was re-activated long after the Variscan orogeny—probably during early Cenozoic times when the North Atlantic was opening—and this second phase of movement may have freshened an ancient weathering profile now preserved along the fault's eastern wall.

== See also ==
- List of geological faults of Wales
