= Central Highlands terrane =

Sequence of rocks in Scotland

The Central Highlands terrane in Scotland, also known as the Grampian terrane, is a sequence of early Paleozoic metamorphic rocks containing many igneous intrusions. It stretches from the Great Glen Fault, south-east down to the Highland Boundary.

The terrane contains mostly gabbro and gneiss that show intrusions of granite and dolerite. Limestones in the region also contain many fossils such as trilobites and brachiopods.
