= Bristol Channel Fault Zone =

Geological fault between England and Wales

Coordinates: 51°20′N 3°13′W

The Bristol Channel Fault Zone or Central Bristol Channel Fault Zone is a major south-dipping geological fault, or zone of faulting, running approximately west–east in the Bristol Channel between England and Wales. It makes landfall just south of Weston-super-Mare and the Mendip Hills. It forms a divide between the late Palaeozoic age South Wales basin to the north and the Culm Basin to the south. It marks a major change in the pre-Variscan geology of the United Kingdom, juxtaposing very different sequences of Devonian and Lower Carboniferous rocks. During the Variscan, the fault may have acted as either a strike-slip fault or a thrust fault or indeed both; its nature remains uncertain. During the Triassic to Jurassic, the fault zone was active as an extensional fault, controlling the development of the Bristol Channel Basin.

== Tectonic setting and evolution ==
The Bristol Channel Fault Zone (BCFZ) runs WNW–ESE for roughly 155 km beneath the Bristol Channel, with the basin widening to about 30 km and containing up to 3.4 km of Mesozoic–Tertiary sediments. During the Permo-Triassic to Early Cretaceous the BCFZ acted as the master "down-to-the-south" normal fault that let the southern block subside, creating a half-graben—a wedge-shaped depression bounded on one side by a single major fault. This subsidence reused an older Variscan thrust (the Bristol Channel Thrust), so the basin's shape is inherited from late Palaeozoic structures. Regional extension was mainly NNE–SSW, generating networks of smaller transfer faults and mineral-filled tension fractures alongside the principal break. Comparable rift packages of Triassic–Aptian age are seen in the neighbouring Wessex and South Celtic Sea basins, indicating that the BCFZ formed part of a wider Mesozoic rift system that went quiet in the Late Cretaceous.

Compressional forces linked to the Alpine orogeny subsequently "inverted" the earlier rift. From the Palaeocene to Oligocene—and locally into the Miocene—the former normal faults became steep buttresses against which the basin fill was squeezed, producing north-facing folds, low-angle thrusts and strike-slip faults. This inversion became overprinted, but it did not wholly erase the older layout: many earlier faults still guide present-day fracture patterns and fluid pathways. Fracture porosity created during both the rift and the squeeze events reaches 20 % in places, giving the BCFZ geological significance for hydrocarbon migration as well as for academic studies of basin reactivation.

== See also ==
- List of geological faults of England
- List of geological faults of Wales
