= Scottish Lowlands =

Cultural and historic region of Scotland

Lowlands A' Ghalldachd (Scottish Gaelic) Lallans, Lawlands (Scots)
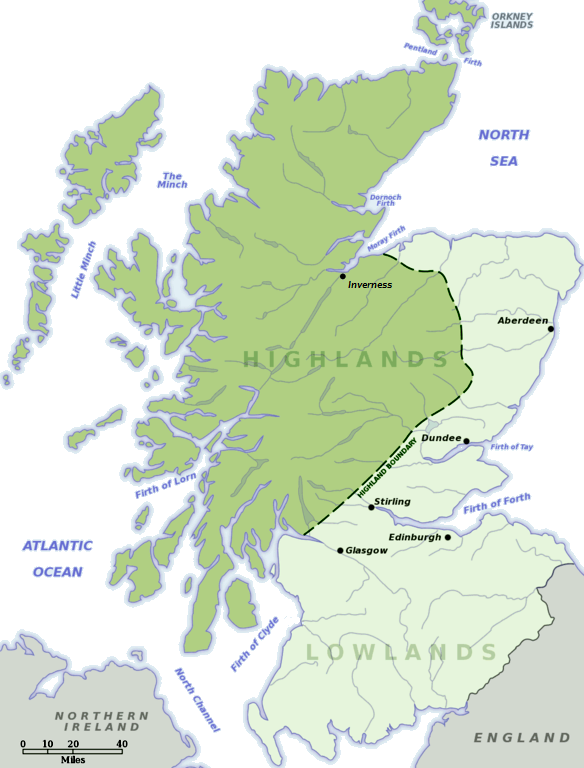
- The Lowlands, shown in light green
- Country: Scotland
- Demonym: Lowlander
- Time zone: UTC+0 (GMT)
  - Summer (DST): UTC+1 (BST)

The Lowlands (Scots: Lallans or Lawlands, pronounced [ˈlɑːlən(d)z, ˈlo̜ːl-]; Scottish Gaelic: a' Ghalldachd, lit. 'place of the foreigners', pronounced [ə ˈɣauɫ̪t̪əxk]) is a cultural and historical region of Scotland.

The region is characterised by its relatively flat or gently rolling terrain as opposed to the mountainous landscapes of the Scottish Highlands. This area includes cities like Edinburgh and Glasgow and is known for its fertile farmland, historic sites, and urban centres. It is the more populous and industrialised part of Scotland compared to the sparsely populated Highlands.

Culturally, the Lowlands and the Highlands diverged from the Late Middle Ages into the modern period, when Lowland Scots replaced Scottish Gaelic throughout most of the Lowlands.

== Geography ==
Geographically, Scotland is divided into three distinct areas: the Highlands, the Central plain (Central Belt, in the Central Lowlands), and the Southern Uplands. The Lowlands cover roughly the latter two. The northeast plain is also "low-land", both geographically and culturally, but in some contexts may be grouped together with the Highlands.

The Lowlands is not an official geographical or administrative area of the country. There are two main topographic regions: the Lowlands and the Southern Uplands. The term "Lowlands" mainly refers to the Central Lowlands. However, in normal usage it refers to those parts of Scotland not in the Highlands (or Gàidhealtachd). The boundary is usually considered to be a line between Stonehaven and Helensburgh (on the Firth of Clyde). The Lowlands lie south and east of the line. Some parts of the Lowlands (such as the Southern Uplands) are not physically "low", Merrick for example reaching 2,766 feet (843 m), while some areas indisputably in the Highlands (such as Islay) are low-lying.

For other purposes, the boundary varies; but if the Boundary Fault is used, then the traditional Scottish counties entirely in the Lowlands are Ayrshire, Berwickshire, Clackmannanshire, Dumfriesshire, East Lothian, Fife, Kinross-shire, Kirkcudbrightshire, Lanarkshire, Midlothian, Peeblesshire, Renfrewshire, Roxburghshire, Selkirkshire, West Lothian, and Wigtownshire. Prior to 1921, the counties of East Lothian, Midlothian, and West Lothian were known as Haddingtonshire, Edinburghshire, and Linlithgowshire.

Traditional Scottish counties which straddle the Boundary fault include Angus, Dunbartonshire, Stirlingshire, Perthshire and Kincardineshire.

The term "Lowlands" is sometimes used to refer specifically to the "Central Lowlands", an area also known as the "Midland Valley". This area mainly encompasses the basins of the Rivers Forth and Clyde, and houses approximately 80 percent of Scotland's population (3.5 million in the Central Belt). Historically, the Midland Valley has been Scotland's most agriculturally productive region. During the 19th and early 20th centuries, it experienced significant industrialisation and urbanisation, driven by coal deposits. While coal mining and heavy industry have declined ever since, the Midland Valley's economic importance endures. Today, it remains a central hub of the Scottish economy, with a focus on electronics, computer manufacturing, and service sectors like telecommunications, computer software, and finance.

The southernmost counties of Scotland, nearest the Anglo-Scottish border, are also known as the Borders. They are sometimes considered separately from the rest of the Lowlands. Many ancestors of the Scotch-Irish, as they are known in the United States, or Ulster-Scots, originated from the lowlands and borders region before migrating to the Ulster Plantation in the 17th century and later the American frontier, many prior to the American Revolution.

The term Scottish Lowlands is used with reference to the Scots language in contrast to the Scottish Gaelic spoken in the Highlands (although historically also in the lowlands until the 15th century and 18th century in Galloway), to the Scottish history and to the Scottish clan system, as well as in family history and genealogy.

== Military units ==
Military units associated with the region at various times include the Lowland Brigade, the Royal Scots and the 52nd (Lowland) Infantry Division.
