= Pennine Fault System =

The Pennine Fault System is a NW-SE trending zone of faulting that forms the southwestern boundary to the Pennines in Cumbria. It was formed as a normal fault during Permian rifting, bounding the Vale of Eden basin, which has a half-graben geometry. It links through to the Dent Fault at its southeastern end. Rocks of Ordovician and Silurian age outcrop between the two main strands of the fault, forming the Cross Fell inlier.
