= Central Lowlands =

Geologically defined area of relatively low-lying land in southern Scotland

Coordinates: 56.408°N 4.044°W

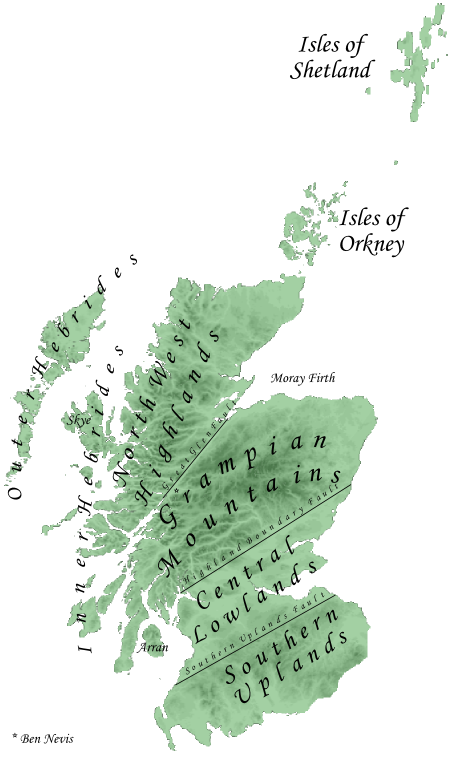
The main geographical divisions of Scotland

The Central Lowlands, sometimes called the Midland Valley or Central Valley, is a geologically defined area of relatively low-lying land in southern Scotland. It consists of a rift valley between the Highland Boundary Fault to the north and the Southern Uplands Fault to the south. The Central Lowlands are one of the three main geographical sub-divisions of Scotland, the other two being the Highlands and Islands which lie to the north, northwest and the Southern Uplands, which lie south of the associated second fault line. It is the most populated of Scotland’s three geographical regions.

== Geology and geomorphology ==
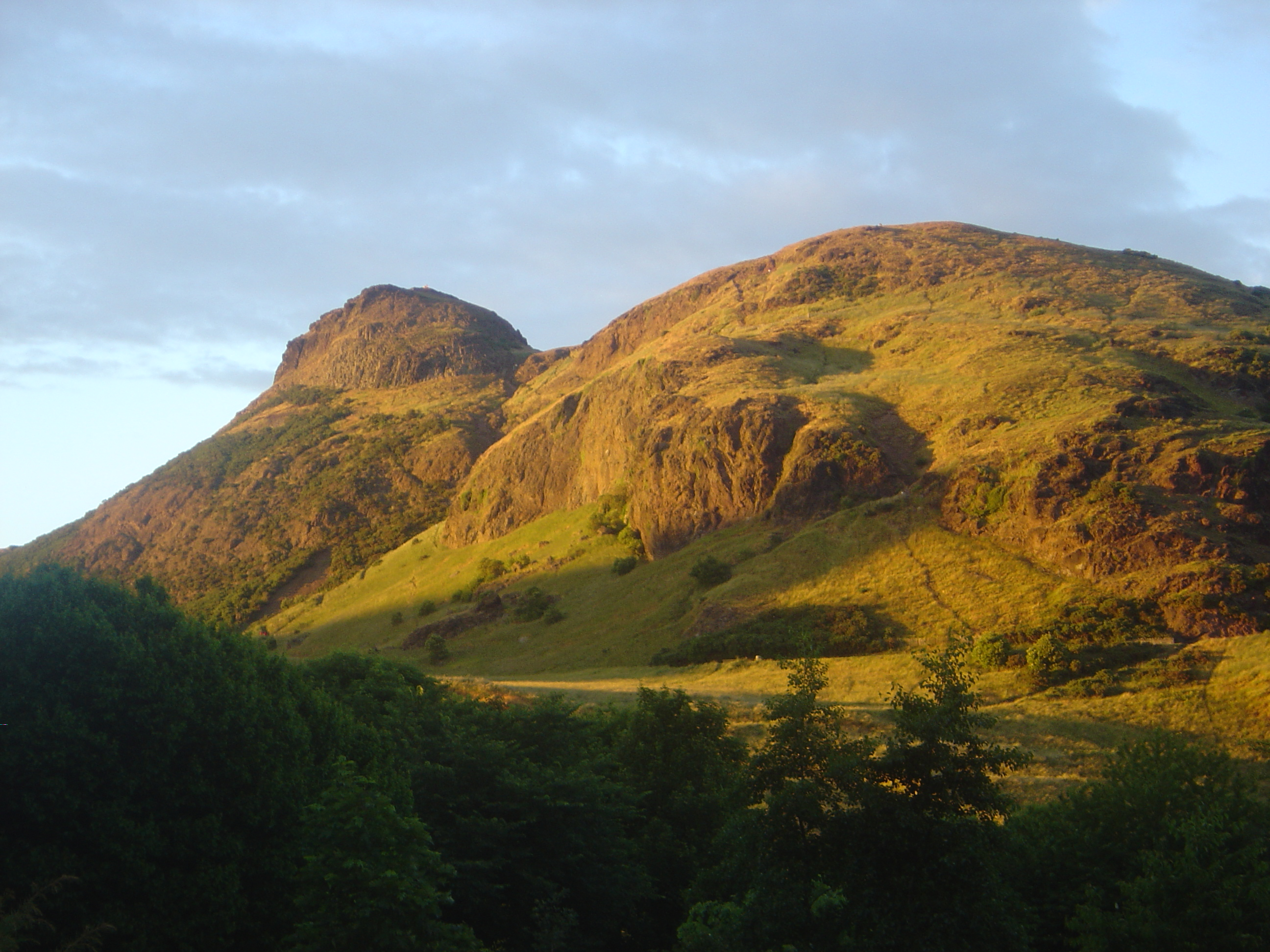
Arthur's Seat in Edinburgh

The Central Lowlands is largely underlain by Paleozoic formations. Many of these sedimentary rocks have economic significance for it is here that the coal and iron bearing rocks that fueled Scotland's Industrial Revolution are to be found. This area has also experienced intense volcanism, Arthur's Seat in Edinburgh being the remnant of a once much larger volcano active in the Carboniferous period some 300 million years ago. This area is relatively low-lying, although even here hills such as the Ochils and Campsie Fells are rarely far from view. In common with the rest of Scotland the whole region was affected by Pleistocene glaciations.

=== Boundary faults ===
The Highland Boundary Fault runs from North Glen Sannox on the Isle of Arran in the south and west through the Isle of Bute and Helensburgh, then forms the northern boundary of Strathmore before reaching Stonehaven in the north east. The fault was active during the Caledonian orogeny, a plate tectonic collision which took place from Mid Ordovician to Mid Devonian periods (520 to 400 million years ago), during the closure of the Iapetus Ocean. The fault allowed the Midland Valley to descend as a major rift by as much as 4000 metres and there was subsequently vertical movement. This earlier vertical movement was later replaced by a horizontal shear.

The Southern Uplands Fault runs from the Rhins of Galloway in the west towards Dunbar on the east coast 30 miles (50 km) from Edinburgh.

== Human geography ==
A productive combination of fertile low-lying agricultural land and significant deposits of economically valuable coal and iron have led to the Central Lowlands being much more densely populated than the rest of Scotland. The cities of Glasgow, Edinburgh, Dunfermline, Stirling, Perth and Dundee all lie in the Central Lowlands, and over 75% of Scotland's population lives in this region.

== See also ==
- Central Scotland (disambiguation)
- Geology of Scotland
- Scottish Lowlands
