= Dent Fault =

Fault zone in northern England

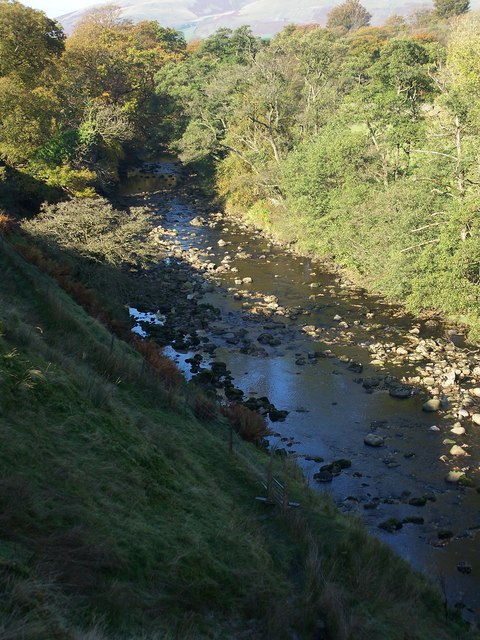
The fault as it is crossed by the Clough River

The Dent Fault is a major fault zone on the boundary between the counties of Cumbria and North Yorkshire in northern England. It is named after the village of Dent in Dentdale, on the western margin of the Yorkshire Dales.

The fault, or rather the 'Dent Fault System' – a collection of closely associated faults and folds, defines the western edge of the Askrigg Block, a geological structure that underlies the Yorkshire Dales. The fault is associated with the Taythes Anticline to its west and the Fell End Syncline to its east. Other than vertical movement on the fault, there has also been an element of strike-slip movement.

To the north, the fault links with the Pennine Fault System in the vicinity of Brough and with the Craven Fault System near Kirkby Lonsdale to the south.

== Regional setting ==
The Carboniferous geology of northern England consists of a series of relatively high and stable "blocks", such as the Alston Block separated by actively subsiding "basins", generally referred to as "troughs", such as the Stainmore and Gainsborough Troughs. Some of the blocks are underpinned by granitic intrusions of either Ordovician or Devonian age. The block and basin terrain was a result of active extensional faulting, with a dominant N-S extension direction, possibly related to the effects of back-arc spreading related to north-directed subduction beneath Avalonia.

Later in the Carboniferous, the onset of continental collision to the south of Avalonia, caused widespread reactivation of the extensional faults in reverse. Many of the basin show signs of inversion at this time. The dominant shortening direction in northwest England is NNW-SSE.

== Geometry ==
The Dent Fault consists of a series of linked steep SSW-NNE trending sub-parallel faults with associated folds. The northern part of the structure, known as the Dent Line, has the form of a faulted monocline that eventually links through to the Pennine Fault. The southern part of the fault zone consist of three major fault segments.

== Access ==
A waymarked educational trail, the Sedgwick Trail, explores the fault. It is named after the geologist Adam Sedgwick.

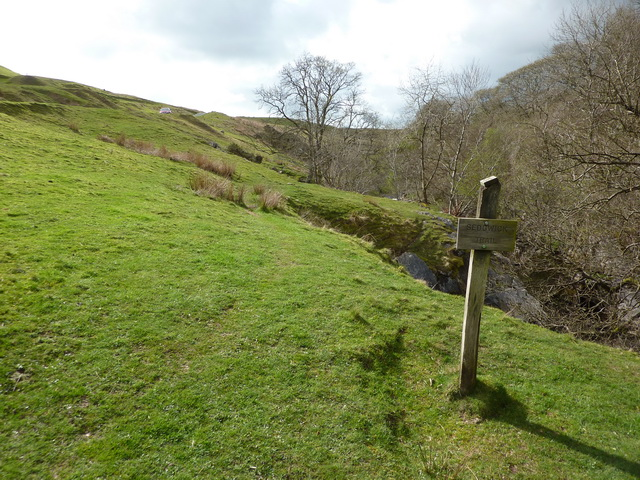
