= Great Glen Fault =

Geological fault in Scotland

Coordinates: 57.08°N 4.76°W

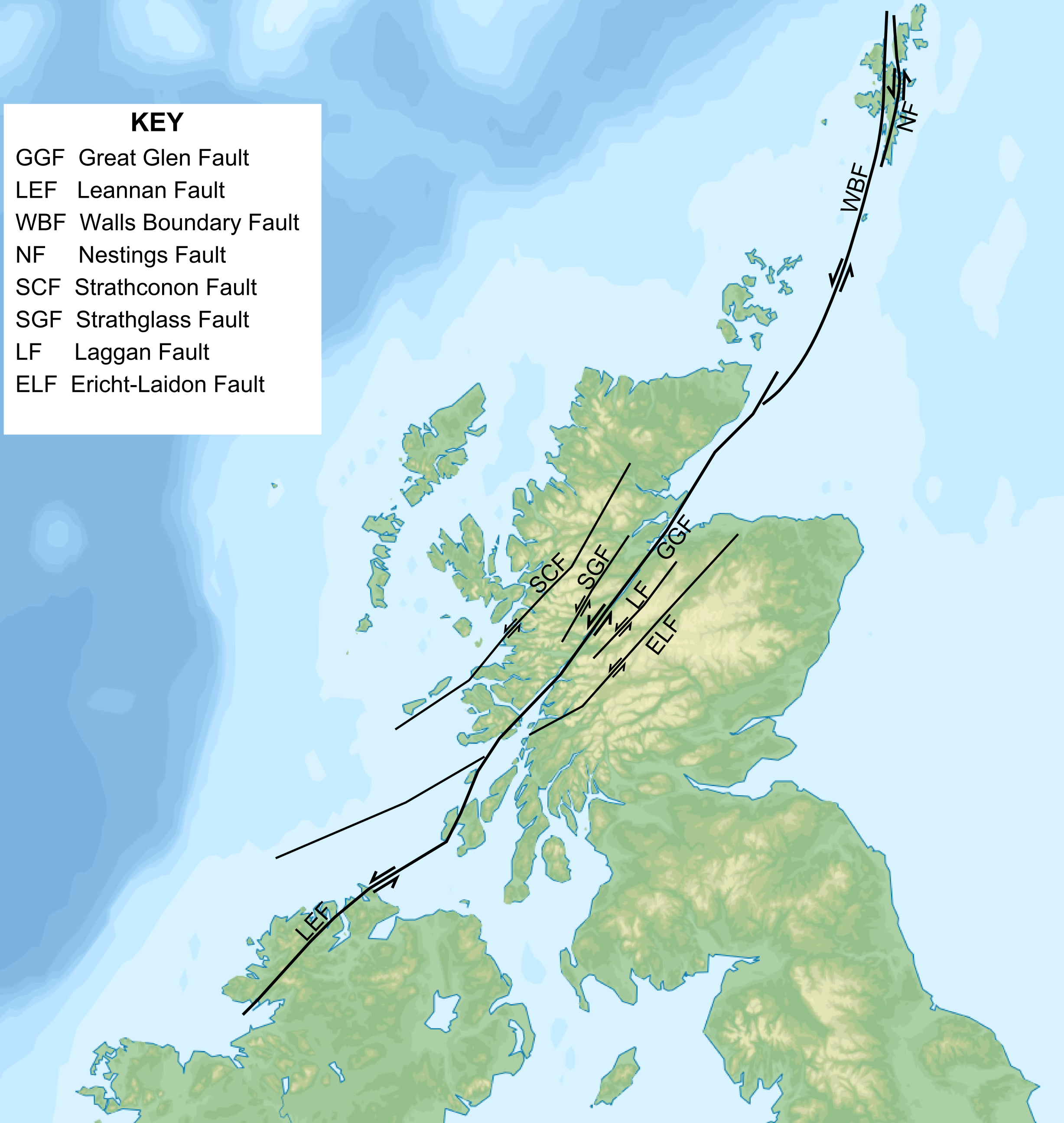
Map of the Great Glen Fault and other late Caledonian strike-slip faults in Scotland and northwestern Ireland

The Great Glen Fault is a strike-slip fault that runs through the Great Glen in Scotland. Occasional moderate tremors have been recorded over the past 150 years.

== Location ==
Aligned northeast to southwest, the Great Glen Fault extends further southwest in a straight line through Loch Linnhe and the Firth of Lorne, and then on into northwestern Ireland, directly through Lough Swilly, Donegal Bay and Clew Bay as the Leannan Fault. To the northeast, the fault connects to the Walls Boundary Fault and the associated Melby Fault and Nestings Fault, before becoming obscured by the effects of Mesozoic rifting to the north of Shetland.

The fault continues on the North American side of the North Atlantic Ocean, but is no longer part of a contiguous fault, as the complete fault was broken when the Mid-Atlantic Ridge formed 200 million years ago. The North American side of the fault runs through the length of northwestern Newfoundland, Canada, as the Cabot Fault (Long Range Fault) and on into the Gulf of St. Lawrence. It is at least 300 miles (480 kilometres) long.

== Geological history ==
Metamorphic zones, and Moine Thrust Belt, Great Glen Fault and Highland Boundary Fault

Euramerica in the Devonian (416 to 359 Ma) with Baltica, Avalonia (Cabot Fault, Newfoundland and Great Glen Fault, Scotland) and Laurentia

The Great Glen Fault has a long movement history. It formed towards the end of the Caledonian orogeny associated with the collision between the Laurentia and Baltic tectonic plates at the end of the Silurian continuing into the Early Devonian (likely age range 430–390 Ma (million years)). The movement at that time was sinistral (left-lateral), the same as the closely related set of faults sub-parallel to the main part of the Great Glen Fault, which include the Strathconon and Strathglass faults to the northwest and the Laggan, Tyndrum and Ericht-Laidon faults to the southeast. The second main phase of movement was during the Carboniferous, this time with a dextral sense.

The exact timing is uncertain, but associated folds within the Devonian are cut by members of the Late Carboniferous to Early Permian dyke swarm. The Great Glen Fault had its final phase of movement during the Late Cretaceous to Early Tertiary. The displacement is estimated to be 64 miles (104 km).

Erosion along the fault zone during Quaternary glaciation formed Loch Ness.

== Recent history ==
In the 19th century, a boat canal known as the Caledonian Canal was dug through the Great Glen; the canal is still used today.

== Seismic activity ==
There is no agreement about whether the Great Glen Fault is "active" – accumulating seismic slip. Some parts of the fault are moving in opposite directions, but the extent of the displacement is not agreed. The displacement could be at least the full length of the exposed fault on mainland Scotland.

Most researchers consider the fault active or a "reactivated strike-slip fault within the continental crust" that is accumulating tectonic strain. Some researchers say the observed seismic activity of the last 300 years does not support a theory of re-activation. According to Roger Musson, the fault does not show any signs of present activity. Musson places the 1901 Inverness earthquake on a secondary fault of the Great Glen Fault.

Occasional moderate tremors have been recorded over the past 150 years. Accordingly, seismic buffers were incorporated into the Kessock Bridge carrying the A9 road out of Inverness.

== See also ==
- Aspy Fault
- Avalonia
- Long Range Mountains
