= Southern Uplands Fault =

Scottish geological feature

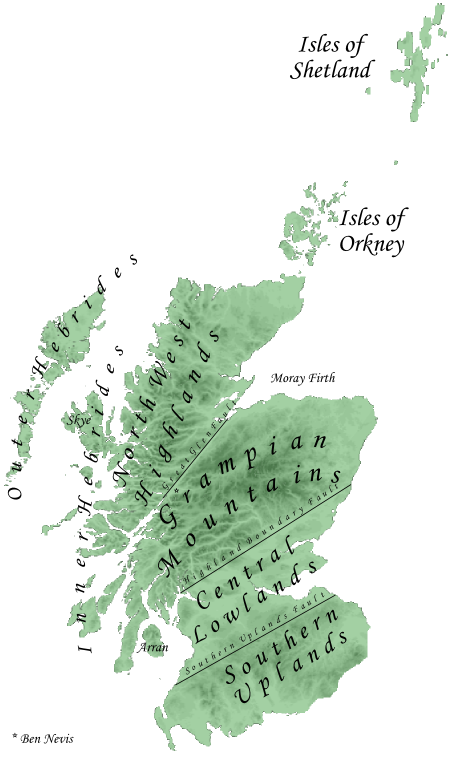
Scotland, geographical areas.

The Southern Uplands Fault (or occasionally Southern Upland Fault) is a fault in Scotland that runs from Girvan (or more specifically from the Rhins of Galloway) to Dunbar on the East coast. It marks the southern boundary of the Scottish Midland Valley and the northern margin of the Southern Uplands; indeed it is recognised as a boundary between these two terranes. Both sinistral and dextral strike-slip movement is recorded from parts of the fault as are down-north and down-south normal movements suggestive of a complex history.

The Stinchar, Dove Cove and Glen App faults form a part of the Southern Upland Fault Zone in the southwest whilst in the northeast, the Lammermuir, Dunbar-Gifford, Crossgatehall, Pentland and Firth of Forth faults are all associated with the Southern Uplands Fault.

== See also ==
- Highland Boundary Fault
- Southern Uplands
- Geology of Scotland
