= Cape North (Nova Scotia) =

Headland on Cape Breton Island, Canada

Coordinates: 47°02′00″N 60°24′57″W

Cape North in Nova Scotia

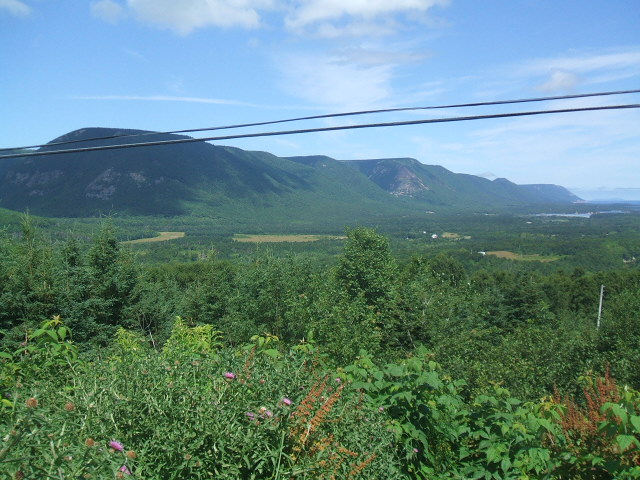
Sunrise Valley, Cape North in 2010

Cape North is a headland at the northeastern end of Cape Breton Island. It is in the jurisdiction of the Municipality of the County of Victoria, Nova Scotia, Canada.

Cape North contains the landforms Pollett's Cove, Wilkie Sugar Loaf and the Aspy Fault and the unincorporated areas of South Harbour, and Dingwall.

The Mi'kmaq called it Uktutuncok, meaning 'Highest Mountain'.

Cape North is claimed to have been the Prima Tierra Vista or first land seen by explorer John Cabot. Despite the ongoing dispute, the event is commemorated by Cabots Landing Provincial Park.

Cape North Lighthouse was built in 1874, and a fog alarm added in 1906. It was destaffed in 1989, and replaced with a modern beacon in 2010.
