= François-Josué de La Corne Dubreuil =

French military officer (1710–1753)

François-Josué de La Corne Dubreuil (7 October 1710 — 17 October 1753) was a French military officer in the colonial regular troops of New France and, as was the norm of the day, involved in family commercial enterprises. He was the son of Jean-Louis de la Corne de Chaptes and a brother of Louis de la Corne, Chevalier de la Corne, and Luc de la Corne. His first posting as a commandant of a post was at the Fort Kaministiquia, beginning in 1741, where he also engaged in the fur trade.

== Biography ==
His career took him to the Ohio country, where in June 1753, he became seriously ill while surveying the portage at Fort Le Boeuf. His illness forced him to return to Quebec where he died. François-Josué was a recipient of the cross of Saint Louis.

He was survived by his only child, François-Michel, who probably drowned with his uncle, Louis de La Corne, in the sunken ship Auguste in November 1761.

== Sources ==
- Oury, Guy-M. (1990). "Une famille canadienne dans la tourmente révolutionnaire : le Chevalier de la Corne". Les Cahiers des dix (45): 67–94. doi:10.7202/1015569ar.
- Russ, C. J (1974). "La Corne Dubreuil, Francois-Josué de". In Halpenny, Francess G. (ed.). Dictionary of Canadian Biography. Vol. III (1741–1770) (online ed.). University of Toronto Press.
