= Aspy =

Aspy may refer to:

- Aspy River, northeastern Cape Breton Island, Nova Scotia, Canada
- Aspy Fault, in the same region as the river
- Aspy Bay

== People ==
- Aspy Engineer (1912–2002), Indian diplomat
- Aspy Adajania, Indian sports administrator
- Aspy, Romanian musician

== See also ==
- ASPI (disambiguation)
- Aspie, a person with Asperger syndrome
