= Jean-Louis de la Corne de Chaptes =

French military officer (1666–1732)

- Born: October 23, 1666; Chaptes, France
- Died: May 6, 1732 (aged 65); Montreal, New France
- Children: Louis de la Corne, Chevalier de la Corne; Luc de la Corne; François-Josué de la Corne Dubreuil

Jean-Louis de la Corne de Chaptes, (b. October 23, 1666 – d. May 6, 1732) was from Chaptes, France. He arrived in New France in 1685 and, other than a trip home to France, served his whole adult life in the military. He achieved some military honours but little wealth and died leaving his wife in limited circumstances.

He established one of the most important families in New France and his four sons all did well. One son, Louis de la Corne, Chevalier de la Corne was both a successful soldier and a fur trader while another son, Luc de la Corne became one of the wealthiest men in Canada. A third son, François-Josué de la Corne Dubreuil was an active soldier and trader. All four were awarded the cross of Saint Louis as was Jean-Louis.
