= Aspy Bay =

Bay in Nova Scotia, Canada

Coordinates: 46°57′11.76″N 60°24′00.00″W

Aspy Bay in Nova Scotia

Aspy Bay (/ˈæspi/) is a bay of the Atlantic Ocean near the northern tip of Cape Breton Island, Nova Scotia. Principal features along the bay's coast are the Wilkie Sugar Loaf hill and the Aspy Fault.

Communities along the bay include Smelt Brook, White Point, South Harbour, and Dingwall.

The name "Aspy" is Basque in origin, after Aspe Peak in the Pyrenees, or the monastery of Santa Maria de Axpe near the Bay of Biscay; there are however other theories regarding the origin of the name. A surviving French chart found at the Depot General des Dartes in France and dated 1780 refers to the area as "Aspe". Records dating from the earlier 1700s identify the area as Egmont Bay, with a mostly French fishing fleet of 30 shallops stationed there.

At the time the first permanent settlers arrived, mostly Loyalists, the area was known as Wegwaak, meaning "Turning Suddenly" in Miꞌkmaq.

== History ==
There is a minority view that John Cabot landed in or near Aspy Bay in 1497, which would be the first documented European landing on what is now Canadian soil, after the Norse landings. In keeping with this view, Cabots Landing Provincial Park along the western shore of the bay has a National Historic Site cairn and bust to commemorate Cabot's landfall.

At Aspy Bay and nearby Bay St. Lawrence, cod, mackerel, and dogfish were caught by the early settlers. Merchants would arrive and these fish would be largely sold to buyers in Halifax and to inland farmers.

The unpredictable weather and rugged coastline of large portions of the bay and nearby St. Paul Island contributed to several marine tragedies as the area was being charted and settled. In 1761 the sailing ship Auguste sank in Aspy Bay, with the loss of 114 lives. Many notable Canadians died during the sinking, including Charles-René Dejordy de Villebon, Louis-Joseph Gaultier de La Vérendrye, and Louis de la Corne, Chevalier de la Corne. The brigantine St. Lawrence, sailing from Quebec, was shipwrecked near Chéticamp on December 5, 1780, and her crew came ashore and were stranded. Lieut. Prentiss, the officer in charge, took a boat and went in search of inhabitants. Proceeding northward they found the coast very rugged and high, and after weeks of subsisting on boiled kelp and roots, they rounded Money Point and before long came ashore on the sandy beaches of Aspy Bay near present-day Dingwall. Exhausted, frozen, and with all provisions gone, the desperate men made camp and cast lots with the aim of choosing one of their number to sacrifice as food for the rest. The discovery of some edible rosebuds the following morning provided enough food to prevent the survivors from following through on their grim plan. The group was eventually saved by a party of local natives who told them a tale of another French vessel which was wrecked in Aspy Bay with great loss of life a few years prior. The Indians recalled bringing the bodies of drowned French children ashore on the sands of Aspy Bay, and later finding and assisting the survivors who had suffered tremendously from cold and hunger for five days. This is not believed to have been the Auguste, as that ship was carrying French prisoners.

The first European settlers in the area reported finding a very large skull. The teeth were said to resemble those of a human in all respects but size. One tooth was sent to Sydney by ship for examination and was recorded to measure eight inches in length and four inches in width. A legend prevailed among natives who hunted in the area regarding an immense creature unlike any known animal. According to this legend, the creature had been observed in the waters of Aspy Bay and observers had been so terrified that they would not dare approach the area again for some time. Other reports from early settlers speak of observing huge bones, resembling thigh bones, lying at the bottom of a nearby lake. There have been no credible sightings in modern times.

In 1856 the Nova Scotia terminus of the Transatlantic telegraph cable was made at the small community of Aspy Bay, northwest of Dingwall.

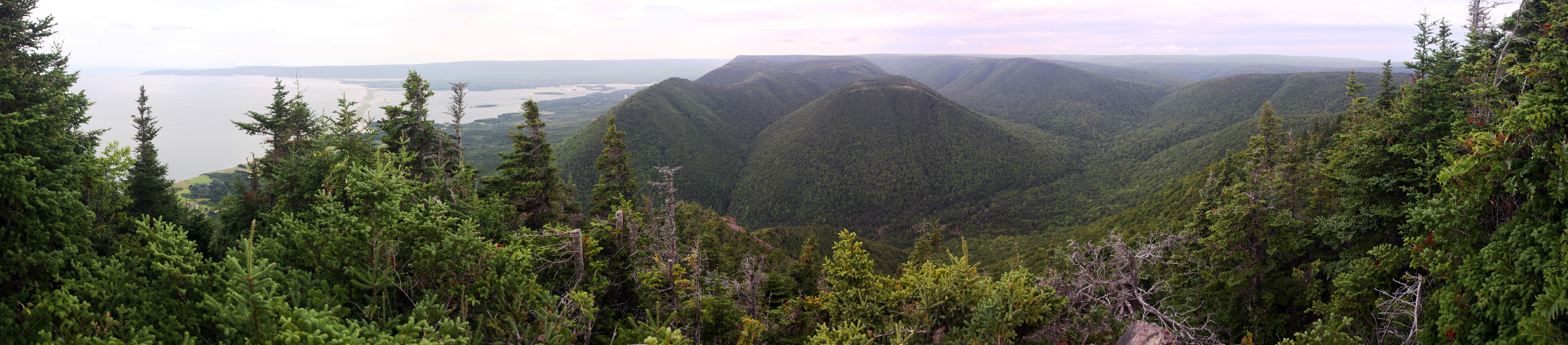
The view over Aspy Bay and the Aspy Fault from the Wilkie Sugar Loaf trail South Lookoff
