= List of shipwrecks in August 1870 =

The list of shipwrecks in August 1870 includes ships sunk, foundered, grounded, or otherwise lost during August 1870.

== 1 August ==
List of shipwrecks: 1 August 1870
Ship	State	Description
Doune Castle	United Kingdom	The ship ran aground in the Yangtze. She was on a voyage from Shanghai, China to London. She had been refloated by 26 August and had resumed her voyage.
Dreadnought	(United Kingdom of Great Britain and Ireland) Leeward Islands	The schooner was run down and sunk by a French steamship. All on board were rescued. She was on a voyage from Barbados to Montserrat and Nevis.
Eamont	United Kingdom	The brig ran aground on the Gunfleet Sand, in the North Sea off the coast of Essex. She was on a voyage from Gävle, Sweden to London. She was refloated and taken in to Harwich, Essex in a waterlogged condition.
Innisfail	United Kingdom	The brig ran aground on the Gore Sands, in the Bristol Channel off the coast of Somerset. She was on a voyage from Dublin to Cardiff, Glamorgan. She was refloated and resumed her voyage.
Kate Winifred	United Kingdom	The ship struck a rock south east of Celebes Island, Netherlands East Indies and was wrecked. Her crew were rescued. She was on a voyage from "Zebu" to London.
Rover	United Kingdom	The brig ran aground off Dundee, Forfarshire. She was on a voyage from Riga, Russia to Dundee.

== 2 August ==
List of shipwrecks: 2 August 1870
Ship	State	Description
Argonaut	United States	The ship was damaged by fire at New York. She was on a voyage from New York to Bremen.
Nellie Fenwick	United States	The ship caught fire off Block Island, Rhode Island. She was on a voyage from Azua, Dominican Republic to Boston, Massachusetts. She was discovered the next day by Hattie J. Hamlin (United States) and towed in to "Maryport".
Rose	United Kingdom	The steamship ran ashore at Ballantrae, Ayrshire. She was on a voyage from the Clyde to Londonderry. She was refloated.

== 3 August ==
List of shipwrecks: 3 August 1870
Ship	State	Description
Pride of the Nile	United Kingdom	The smack was destroyed by fire at Grimsby, Lincolnshire.
Scotia	United Kingdom	The steamship collided with the steamship Magna Charta (United Kingdom) and sank off Gotland, Sweden. Her 30 crew were rescued by Magna Charta. Scotia was on a voyage from Sunderland, County Durham to Kronstadt, Russia.

== 5 August ==
List of shipwrecks: 5 August 1870
Ship	State	Description
Grushevka	Russia	The paddle steamer foundered 90 nautical miles (170 km) south west of The Lizard, Cornwall, United Kingdom. Her thirteen crew were rescued by a Spanish brig. She was on her maiden voyage, from the River Tyne to Rostov-on-Don.
Julie	United Kingdom	The ship foundered off St. Ives, Cornwall. Her crew were rescued by Titania (United Kingdom). Julie was on a voyage from Saundersfoot, Pembrokeshire to Shoreham-by-Sea, Sussex.
Libertad	Argentina	The ship ran ashore on "Byron Island" and caught fire. She was on a voyage from Montreal, Quebec, Canada to Buenos Aires.
Magna Charter	United Kingdom	The steamship ran aground at Vindava, Courland Governorate. She was on a voyage from Riga, Russia to Vindava.

== 6 August ==
List of shipwrecks: 6 August 1870
Ship	State	Description
Bridgewater	United States	The ship ran aground near Havre de Grâce, Seine-Inférieure, France.
Brooksby	United Kingdom	The smack was driven ashore and wrecked on Island Davaar, Argyllshire.
Esperance	Netherlands	The ship ran aground on the Leigh Middle Sand, in the Thames Estuary.
Flora	United Kingdom	The ship was wrecked on the Sail Rock Reef, in the Caicos Islands. She was on a voyage from Halifax, Nova Scotia, Canada to Kingston, Jamaica.
Havannah	United Kingdom	The ship was wrecked at Solva, Pembrokeshire.
Lorena	United Kingdom	The ship was destroyed by fire in Possession Roads. Her crew were rescued. She was on a voyage from Réunion to Madagascar.
Rosinante	Paraguay	The ship was destroyed by fire at Humaitá with the loss of three lives.
Speed	United Kingdom	The ship was driven ashore on the east coast of Öland, Sweden. She was on a voyage from Skellefteå, Sweden to Dunkirk, Nord, France. She was refloated and resumed her voyage.
St. Michael	United Kingdom	The ship was abandoned off "Acheer Head". Her crew were rescued by the barque William Stewart. St. Michael was on a voyage from Cocanada, India to London.
Violet	United Kingdom	The ship was wrecked on the Cobarubia Reef, Bahamas. Her crew were rescued. She was on a voyage from Greenock, Renfrewshire to Cárdenas, Cuba.

== 7 August ==
List of shipwrecks: 7 August 1870
Ship	State	Description
Cartero	United Kingdom	The barque was abandoned at Hokianga, New Zealand.
Tamanga	New Zealand	The steamship collided with another vessel in Hen and Chicken Bay with the loss of 21 lives. The other vessel, a coal retch, also foundered.

== 8 August ==
List of shipwrecks: 8 August 1870
Ship	State	Description
Blair Atholl	United Kingdom	The ship was driven ashore near "Kuter Milardovich", Russia. She was on a voyage from Nicolaieff, Russia to an English port.
Emily Fisher	United Kingdom	The ship was wrecked on East Point, Haiti. She was on a voyage from Aux Cayes, Haiti to Curaçao and "Goujera".
Victory	United Kingdom	The schooner was driven ashore on Skye, Outer Hebrides.

== 9 August ==
List of shipwrecks: 9 August 1870
Ship	State	Description
Maximilian	Netherlands	The barque collided with Lady Lawrence (United Kingdom) and sank in the English Channel off Folkestone, Kent, United Kingdom with the loss of three lives. Maximilian was on a voyage from Surinam to Amsterdam, North Holland.

== 10 August ==
List of shipwrecks: 10 August 1870
Ship	State	Description
Beccles	United Kingdom	The brig ran aground and capsized in the River Nene at Wisbech, Cambridgeshire. She was on a voyage from Gävle, Sweden to Wisbech.
Brunette	France	The ship ran aground on the West Rocks, in the North Sea off the coast of Essex, United Kingdom. She was on a voyage from Christiania, Norway to Brest, Finistère. She was refloated and taken in to Harwich, Essex.
Mary	United Kingdom	The ship sank off Brielle, South Holland, Netherlands. She was on a voyage from Hartlepool, County Durham to Rotterdam, South Holland.
Pembrokeshire	United Kingdom	The steamship ran aground and was severely damaged at Pembroke Dockyard, Pembrokeshire.

== 11 August ==
List of shipwrecks: 11 August 1870
Ship	State	Description
Ann and Ellen	United Kingdom	The schooner ran aground and sank at Laxey, Isle of Man.
HMS Midge	Royal Navy	The Beacon-class gunvessel was driven ashore on the coast of China. Subsequently refloated, repaired and returned to service.
Ranger	United Kingdom	The brig was driven ashore and wrecked on Rathlin Island, County Donegal. Her crew survived. She was on a voyage from Londonderry to Workington, Cumberland.

== 12 August ==
List of shipwrecks: 12 August 1870
Ship	State	Description
Agnes C. James	United Kingdom	The barque ran aground at Ballyshannon, County Antrim and was damaged. She was on a voyage from Quebec City, Canada to Ballyshannon.
Andreas and Caroline	Norway	The ship was wrecked at Shoreham-by-Sea, Sussex, United Kingdom.
Deux Frères	Belgium	The ship caught fire at Dunkirk, Nord, France and was scuttled.

== 13 August ==
List of shipwrecks: 13 August 1870
Ship	State	Description
Antelope	United States	The ship ran aground at Saint Croix, Virgin Islands.
Enigheden	Norway	The schooner foundered in the North Sea. Her crew were rescued by Belle Isle (United Kingdom). Enigheden was on a voyage from Newcastle upon Tyne, Northumberland, United Kingdom to Riga, Russia.
Fenelon	France	The steamship was driven ashore in the River Plate. She was on a voyage from Havre de Grâce, Seine-Inférieure to Buenos Aires, Argentina.
Willem III	Netherlands	The steamship was driven ashore and wrecked at Oude-Tonge, South Holland. She was on a voyage from Rotterdam, South Holland to an Italian port.

== 14 August ==
List of shipwrecks: 14 August 1870
Ship	State	Description
Jacoba Gesina	Netherlands	The ship ran aground off the Swedish coast. She was refloated and taken in to Trelleborg, Sweden.
Unnamed	Ottoman Empire	The dredger caught fire and sank in the New Cut of the Danube at Sulina with the loss of nine lives.

== 15 August ==
List of shipwrecks: 15 August 1870
Ship	State	Description
Eleanor	United Kingdom	The brig was driven ashore near Faro, Portugal. She was on a voyage from Constanţa, Ottoman Empire to a British port.
Louisa	France	The brig arrived at Pernambuco, Brazil from London, United Kingdom on fire. The fire was extinguished but her cargo was severely damaged.
Norway	United Kingdom	The ship foundered in the North Sea. Her crew were rescued.

== 16 August ==
List of shipwrecks: 16 August 1870
Ship	State	Description
Good Intent	United Kingdom	The schooner foundered in the Irish Sea 10 nautical miles (19 km) north north west of Great Orme Head, Caernarfonshire. She was on a voyage from Runcorn, Cheshire to Dordrecht, South Holland, Netherlands.

== 17 August ==
List of shipwrecks: 17 August 1870
Ship	State	Description
Aristelle	France	The ship struck a rock and sank 2 nautical miles (3.7 km) south of "Blascow", Finistère. Her crew were rescued. She was on a voyage from Llanelly, Glamorgan, United Kingdom to Paimpol, Côtes-du-Nord.
Dunkeld	United Kingdom	The ship foundered, according to a message in a bottle washed up in Addis Bay, New Zealand in March 1871.
Unnamed	Flag unknown	The brig ran aground on the Longsand, in the North Sea off the coast of Essex, United Kingdom.

== 18 August ==
List of shipwrecks: 18 August 1870
Ship	State	Description
Lebanon	United Kingdom	The barque was damaged by fire in the Atlantic Ocean. She was on a voyage from Quebec City, Canada to Newport, Monmouthshire. The fire was caused by the ship's steward, who had set the fire using kerosene. Although confined to his cabin, he subsequently escaped, jumped overboard, and was drowned.
Nul ay Trott	France	The fishing vessel struck a floating object and foundered in the North Sea off North Sunderland, County Durham, United Kingdom. Her crew were rescued by Early Dawn (United Kingdom).

== 19 August ==
List of shipwrecks: 19 August 1870
Ship	State	Description
City of Sydney	United Kingdom	The ship was sighted in The Downs whilst on a voyage from London to Sydney, New South Wales. No further trace, presumed foundered with the loss of all hands.
Ellora	United Kingdom	The coal hulk was run into by the steamship Richard Cobden (United Kingdom) and sank at Gibraltar. All five people on board were rescued by HMS Samarang (Royal Navy).
Gode Hensigt	Norway	The ship was abandoned off St. Abbs Head, Berwickshire, United Kingdom. Her crew were rescued. She was on a voyage from Dram to Leith, Lothian, United Kingdom.
Honorine Marie	France	The ship was driven ashore on Schiermonnikoog, Friesland, Netherlands. Her crew were rescued.
Nul-s'y-Frotte	France	The lugger struck a sunken wreck and foundered in the North Sea off Berwick upon Tweed, Northumberland, United Kingdom.
Viscount Macduff	United Kingdom	The ship was driven ashore and capsized at Macduff, Aberdeenshire. Her rew were rescued. She was on a voyage from Macduff to a Baltic port.

== 20 August ==
List of shipwrecks: 20 August 1870
Ship	State	Description
Cambyses	United Kingdom	The brig foundered off Madeira. Her ten crew survived.
Friends	United Kingdom	The smack ran aground at Littleferry, Sutherland. She was on a voyage from Montrose, Forfarshire to Littleferry.
Helen	United Kingdom	The schooner was driven ashore at Dragør, Denmark. She was on a voyage from Liverpool, Lancashire to Riga, Russia.
Japan	United Kingdom	The ship was destroyed by fire off Cape Horn, Chile. Her crew were rescued by Matchless (United States). Japan was on a voyage from Liverpool to San Francisco, California, United States.
Mary Bowen	United States	The schooner collided with the schooner America (United States) and sank in Boston Bay. Her crew were rescued. She was on a voyage from Cow Bay, Nova Scotia, Canada to Boston, Massachusetts.

== 21 August ==
List of shipwrecks: 21 August 1870
Ship	State	Description
Wildfire	United Kingdom	The steam yacht capsized in the River Thames at Erith, Kent with the loss of two lives.

== 22 August ==
List of shipwrecks: 22 August 1870
Ship	State	Description
Dragoon	United Kingdom	The steamship ran aground at Copenhagen, Denmark.
General Havelock	United Kingdom	The galley capsized in The Downs. Her three crew were rescued.
Lucy	United Kingdom	The barge foundered off Dartmouth, Devon with the loss of all hands.
Maria Burriss	United Kingdom	The ship departed from Helsingør, Denmark for London. No further trace, presumed foundered with the loss of all hands.
Richmond	United Kingdom	The barque ran aground at the mouth of the Indus and was wrecked. She was on a voyage from London to Kurrachee, India.
Therese	Belgium	The ship ran aground at Copenhagen. She was on a voyage from Antwerp to Narva, Russia.

== 23 August ==
List of shipwrecks: 23 August 1870
Ship	State	Description
Melrose Abbey	United Kingdom	The ship departed from Saigon, French Indo-China for Yokohama, Japan. No further trace, presumed foundered with the loss of all hands.
Seaman's Bride	United Kingdom	The schooner was driven ashore and wrecked in Aspy Bay.

== 24 August ==
List of shipwrecks: 24 August 1870
Ship	State	Description
Clorinde et Marie	France	The ship was wrecked north of Saint-Louis with the loss of her captain.
Constant	New Zealand	The 13-ton ketch was hit by a roller while attempting to cross the bar of the Grey River mouth at low tide. Only one of the three men on board survived.

== 25 August ==
List of shipwrecks: 25 August 1870
Ship	State	Description
Carlotta	Flag unknown	The barque went ashore in the Strait of Juan de Fuca (initially mis-reported as Charlotte).
St. Demetrius	Russia	The lighter sank at Taganrog.

== 26 August ==
List of shipwrecks: 26 August 1870
Ship	State	Description
Almira	United States	The 310-ton whaling ship was stove in by ice and lost in the Arctic Ocean near Point Barrow on the north coast of the Department of Alaska.
Carlotta	United States	The barque was driven ashore in the Strait of Juan de Fuca.
Excelsior	United Kingdom	The ship was damaged by fire at Auckland, New Zealand.
Express	Prussia	The barque was driven ashore and wrecked at Cape Canso, Nova Scotia, Canada. She waws on a voyage from Liverpool, Lancashire, United Kingdom to Cape Canso.
Gambia	United Kingdom	The ship departed from São Vicente, Cape Verde Islands for Wilmington, Delaware, United States. No further trace, presumed foundered with the loss of all hands.

== 27 August ==
List of shipwrecks: 27 August 1870
Ship	State	Description
Alexander	United Kingdom	The barque ran aground and was wrecked on the Longsand, in the North Sea off the coast of Essex. Her crew were rescued. She was on a voyage from South Shields, County Durham to Villaricos, Spain.
Jack Tar	United Kingdom	The schooner collided with the barque Kate Scranton (United Kingdom) and sank in the Kingroad. Her crew were rescued. Jack Tar was on a voyage from Teignmouth, Devon to Bristol, Gloucestershire.

== 28 August ==
List of shipwrecks: 28 August 1870
Ship	State	Description
Essex	United Kingdom	The ship was driven against the quayside and sank at South Shields, County Durham.
Hibernia	United States	The 256-ton whaling ship was wrecked on the Chukchi Sea coast of the Department of Alaska about 2 nautical miles (3.7 km; 2.3 mi) southwest of Point Barrow after ice punched a hole in her bow. Her wreck later was sold at auction.
Hope	United Kingdom	The ship ran aground at Horseshoe Point, in the Humber. She was on a voyage from Jersey, Channel Islands to Newcastle upon Tyne, Northumberland. She was refloated on 27 September and taken in to Grimsby, Lincolnshire in a severely damaged condition.
Mary Ann	United Kingdom	The fishing boat was driven ashore at Whitby, Yorkshire.
Norna	United Kingdom	The cutter ran aground and capsized at Llandudno, Caernarfonshire. Her crew were rescued. She was on a voyage from Holyhead, Anglesey to Liverpool, Lancashire.
Palace	United Kingdom	The ship was driven ashore at Whitby. She was refloated.
Rattler	United Kingdom	The schooner was driven ashore and sank at Birkenhead, Cheshire. Her five crew were rescued by the New Brighton Lifeboat Willie and Arthur ( Royal National Lifeboat Institution). Rattler was on a voyage from Whitehaven, Cumberland to Birkenhead.
Snipe	United Kingdom	The brig ran aground on the Kentish Knock and was abandoned by her crew. She was on a voyage from Newcastle upon Tyne, Northumberland to Boulogne, Pas-de-Calais, France.
St. Jean Baptist	France	The fishing lugger was run down and sunk off the mouth of the Humber by the paddle steamer Sheffield (United Kingdom) with the loss of one of her 21 crew. Survivors were rescued by Sheffield.
Vixen	United Kingdom	The brig was abandoned in the North Sea off Great Yarmouth, Norfolk. Her crew were rescued.

== 29 August ==
List of shipwrecks: 29 August 1870
Ship	State	Description
Ercilla	United Kingdom	The steamship ran aground in the Suez Canal. She was on a voyage from London to Singapore, Straits Settlements and China. She was refloated and resumed her voyage, but was found unfit to continue from Singapore without repairs.
Hope	United Kingdom	The brig was driven ashore and wrecked at Cleethorpes, Lincolnshire. Her nine crew were rescued by the Cleethorpes Lifeboat Manchester Unity ( Royal National Lifeboat Institution).
John Armstrong	United Kingdom	The brig ran aground on a reef off Barbuda. She was on a voyage from Saint Kitts to the Clyde. She was consequently condemned.
Mary Thomson	United Kingdom	The ship sprang a leak and was abandoned off the Mull of Kintyre, Argyllshire. Her crew were rescued. She was on a voyage from Easdale, Inner Hebrides to Glasgow, Renfrewshire.
Nacional	Spain	The brig foundered in the Atlantic Ocean (29°10′N 67°17′W) with the loss of six of her ten crew. Survivors were rescued on 3 September by the barque Gazelle (United States). Nacional was on a voyage from Aguadilla, Puerto Rico to Barcelona with coffee and cotton.
Patria	Norway	The barque was abandoned in the North Sea. Her crew were rescued. She was on a voyage from Wisbech, Cambridgeshire, United Kingdom to Copenhagen, Denmark. She was subsequently towed in to Hellevoetsluis, Zeeland, Netherlands.
Saint Croix	United Kingdom	The ship was driven ashore on Green Island. She was on a voyage from Quebec City to Maryport, Cumberland. She was refloated and resumed her voyage.
Thornley	United Kingdom	The ship was driven ashore and wrecked on Texel, North Holland, Netherlands. Her crew were rescued. She was on a voyage from Seaham, County Durham to the Nieuw Diep.
Unnamed	Netherlands	The smack was abandoned off the coast of Lincolnshire. Both crew were rescued by the Cleethorped Lifeboat Manchester Unity ( Royal National Lifeboat Institution).

== 30 August ==
List of shipwrecks: 30 August 1870
Ship	State	Description
British Empire	United Kingdom	The brig foundered in the North Sea off the Dutch coast. Her six crew were rescued by the schooner Louise Annie (United Kingdom). British Empire was on a voyage from the Nieuwe Diep to Sunderland, County Durham.
Chevalier	United Kingdom	The ship was driven ashore at Saint-Vallier, Quebec, Canada. She was on a voyage from Greenock, Renfrewshire to Quebec City, Canada.
Fitzpatrick	United Kingdom	The steamship was driven ashore on "Little Wrangel Island", near Reval, Russia. She was on a voyage from Kronstadt, Russia to the Clyde. She was refloated on 21 September and taken in to Reval.
Fredericksteen	United Kingdom	The ship sank at Dunkirk, Nord, France. She was on a voyage from London to Dunkirk.
Gustav	Russia	The ship departed from Helsingør, Denmark for London. No further trace, presumed foundered with the loss of all hands.
Jerry	United Kingdom	The schooner foundered 2 nautical miles (3.7 km) off the Varne Lightvessel ( Trinity House). Her crew survived. She was on a voyage from Hull, Yorkshire to Boulogne, Pas-de-Calais, France.

== 31 August ==
List of shipwrecks: 31 August 1870
Ship	State	Description
Coaster	United Kingdom	The brig collided with the steamship Dunkerquois (France) and sank in the North Sea off Spurn Point, Yorkshire. Her crew were rescued by Dunkerquois. Coaster was on a voyage from Fécamp, Seine-Inférieure, France to Hartlepool, County Durham.
Dashing Wave	South Australia	The barque was wrecked on a reef. Her crew took to a boat; they landed on Strong's Island, a distance of 1,400 nautical miles (2,600 km), on 1 November. Dashing Wave was on a voyage from Foo Chow Foo, China to Sydney, New South Wales.
Irene	United Kingdom	The schooner ran aground on the Skerrivoe Rock. She was on a voyage from Arkhangelsk, Russia to Greenock, Renfrewshire. She was refloated and taken in to Stornoway, Isle of Lewis, Outer Hebrides in a leaky condition.
Isabella	United Kingdom	The ship ran aground on the Vogelzand, in the North Sea off the Dutch coast. She was on a voyage from Amsterdam, North Holland, Netherlands to Newcastle upon Tyne, Northumberland. She was refloated and taken in to the Nieuw Diep.
Robert and Mary	United Kingdom	The brig collided with the brigantine Sarah and Jane (United Kingdom) and sank off Whitby, Yorkshire. Two of her crew were rescued by Sarah and Jane, the rest reached the shore. Robert and Mary was on a voyage from Sunderland, County Durham to Southampton, Hampshire.
Unnamed	Flag unknown	The brig was wrecked on the Hinder Bank in the North Sea off the Dutch coast.

== Unknown date ==
List of shipwrecks: Unknown date in August 1870
Ship	State	Description
Adler	United Kingdom	The ship was driven ashore. She was on a voyage from Kronstadt, Russia to Gothenburg, Sweden.
Alert	United Kingdom	The ship was driven ashore at Scheveningen, South Holland, Netherlands. She was on a voyage from Schiedam, South Holland to a Russian port.
Allan	United Kingdom	The schooner was driven ashore at Lau, Gotland, Sweden before 29 August. She was on a voyage from Leith, Lothian to Kronstadt.
Alpha	Flag unknown	The ship was driven ashore.
Anderida	United Kingdom	The ship ran aground on the Barber Sand in the North Sea off the coast of Norfolk. She was on a voyage from Bilbao, Spain to Newcastle upon Tyne. She was refloated and taken in to Great Yarmouth, Norfolk in a severely leaky condition.
Arendina Jacoba	Belgium	The ship was driven ashore near "Apelle". She was on a voyage from Riga, Russia to Antwerp. She was a total loss.
Bartolomeo	Italy	The barque struck the Pearl Rock. She was on a voyage from Sulina, Ottoman Empire to Falmouth, Cornwall, United Kingdom. She was towed in to Gibraltar in a leaky condition.
Bates Family	United Kingdom	The fishing smack was wrecked on Juist, Prussia.
Beaufort	France	The ship ran aground at "Granda". She was on a voyage from Cayenne to Martinique.
Betsey	United Kingdom	The ship was driven ashore at Orfordness, Suffolk. Her crew were rescued. She was on a voyage from Middlesbrough, Yorkshire to Dartmouth, Devon.
Brazilian	United Kingdom	The steamship ran aground in the Suez Canal. She was on a voyage from Bombay, India to a British port.
Calder	United Kingdom	The ship foundered in the Atlantic Ocean. Her crew were rescued. She was on a voyage from Huelva, Spain to the River Tyne.
C. C. Calder	United States	The schooner was wrecked in the Caribbean Sea. Her crew were rescued.
Chieftain	United Kingdom	The smack collided with a French Navy frigate and sank off Heligoland. Her crew survived.
Cissy	United Kingdom	The ship was driven ashore on Green Island. She was on a voyage from Montreal, Quebec to London.
City of Yeddo	Japan	The steamship suffered a boiler explosion and sank at Yeddo with the loss of at least five lives. She was on a voyage from Yeddo to Yokohama.
Commandeyr	Flag unknown	The ship ran aground on the Doom Bar. She was on a voyage from Santos, Brazil to Falmouth.
Condor	Flag unknown	The ship ran aground at Pernambuco, Brazil. She was on a voyage from Trieste to Pernambuco. She was taken in to Pernambuco in a leaky condition.
Delophin	United States	The ship was driven ashore. She was on a voyage from New York to Stettin.
Den Gode Hengist	Norway	The ship was abandoned in the North Sea. She was discovered on 20 August by Besale ( (Denmark) Iceland), which put men aboard and towed her in to Grimsby, Lincolnshire, United Kingdom, where she arrived on 23 August.
Dragon	United Kingdom	The steamship ran aground at Copenhagen, Denmark. She was on a voyage from Newcastle upon Tyne, Northumberland to Copenhagen. She was later refloated and taken in to Copenhagen.
Dunkeld	United Kingdom	The ship was wrecked on the Australian coast before 14 August.
Elite	Flag unknown	The brig ran aground off the coast of the Cape Colony. She was refloated and taken in to "Graham Town".
Elizabeth Sophie	Denmark	The ship was driven ashore near Petten, North Holland, Netherlands.
Emanuel	Russia	The full-rigged ship was driven ashore on the coast of North Holland.
Emily	United Kingdom	The ship was wrecked at Thyborøn, Denmark.
Emma	United Kingdom	The ship was driven ashore at Red Island, Newfoundland Colony. She was on a voyage from Quebec City, Canada to London.
Empire	United Kingdom	The ship was driven ashore at Dieppe, Seine-Inférieure, France.
Enne	France	The schooner collided with another vessel and foundered. She was on a voyage from Lisbon, Portugal to "Yaddy".
Essex	United Kingdom	The steamship ran aground at Copenhagen. She was on a voyage from Hull to Saint Petersburg, Russia. She was refloated and resumed her voyage.
Express	United Kingdom	The ship was driven ashore and wrecked at Canso, Nova Scotia, Canada.
Gaucho	United Kingdom	The ship ran aground near Yokohama, Japan. She was on a voyage from Hakodate to Yokohama.
Germanico	Austria-Hungary	The barque ran aground on the Takle Rocks, in the Sea of Azov before 25 August. She was refloated and taken in to Kertch, Russia for repairs.
Glencairn	United Kingdom	The ship was driven ashore at Beshika Point. She was on a voyage from Galaţi, Ottoman Empire to Falmouth. She was refloated and resumed her voyage.
Governor General	United Kingdom	The ship foundered in the Pacific Ocean. She was on a voyage from Payta, Peru to a British port.
Hallie	Flag unknown	The ship was driven ashore. She was on a voyage from "Markwurde Gilbara" to Falmouth.
Harlech Castle	United Kingdom	The ship was wrecked on the Australian coast before 14 August.
Harmina	Hamburg	The ship foundered in the Dogger Bank. Her crew were rescued. She was on a voyage from Hamburg to Elbing.
Hazledean	United Kingdom	The ship departed from Montreal for the Clyde. No further trace, presumed foundered with the loss of all hands.
Helen Marshall	United Kingdom	The schooner was driven ashore at Dragør, Denmark. She was on a voyage from Liverpool, Lancashire to Riga. She had been refloated by 20 August.
Honolua	Flag unknown	The ship was lost in the Torres Strait. She was on a voyage from Newcastle, New South Wales to Batavia, Netherlands East Indies.
Huddill	United Kingdom	The ship ran aground and sank on the Strasbro Sand.
Isabella	United Kingdom	The ship ran aground on the Roaring Middle Sand, in the North Sea. She was refloated and taken in to King's Lynn, Norfolk in a leaky condition.
Karnak	France	The ship was destroyed by fire on or before 3 August. Her crew were resucued. She was on a voyage from Melbourne, Victoria to Nantes, Loire-Inférieure.
Key Roman	Flag unknown	The ship was lost. Her crew were rescued.
Levanter	United Kingdom	The ship was destroyed by fire in the Atlantic Ocean. She was on a voyage from London to Boston, Massachusetts, United States.
Maria Klickow	Prussia	The ship was driven ashore on Rügen.
Mary Elizabeth	United Kingdom	The ship ran aground on the Barnard Sand. She was refloated and taken in to Lowestoft, Suffolk.
Minister Thorbecke	Netherlands	The steamship ran aground on the Schanserwaard. She was on a voyage from Hull, Yorkshire, United Kingdom to a Dutch port. She was refloated.
Moulin	United Kingdom	The barque was driven ashore and wrecked at "Costellos", Uruguay before 3 August. Her crew survived. She was on a voyage from Leith, Lothian to Buenos Aires, Argentina.
Niobe	United Kingdom	The steamship was driven ashore on Öland, Sweden. She was on a voyage from Saint Petersburg, Russia to London. She was refloated and taken in to Copenhagen, Denmark in a severely leaky condition.
Orange	United Kingdom	The ship ran aground at Pernambuco. She was on a voyage from Trieste to Pernambuco. She was refloated and taken Trieste to Pernambuco.
Paulita	Chile	The coaster was wrecked at Valparaíso.
Pilot	South Australia	The three-masted schooner was wrecked on the coast of New Caledonia.
Regina	Prussia	The brig was abandoned. Her nine crew were rescued by the Banff Lifeboat.
Rover	United Kingdom	The ship ran aground in Riga Bay. She was on a voyage from Riga, Russia to Dundee, Forfarshire.
Rover	United Kingdom	The ship driven ashore at "Steenedam", Zeeland, Netherlands. She was on a voyage from Dordrecht, South Holland to Newcastle upon Tyne. She was refloated in mid-September.
Scud	United States	The barque was abandoned in the Atlantic Ocean. She was on a voyage from Philadelphia, Pennsylvania to Gibraltar. She was discovered in a waterlogged condition by the gunboat Adonis (French Navy), which put some of her crew on board. Scud was towed in to Gibraltar.
Sperance	Netherlands	The ship was driven ashore.
Spy	United Kingdom	The ship sprang a leak and foundered 30 nautical miles (56 km) north of Saint Thomas, Virgin Islands. Her crew were rescued. She was on a voyage from Arecibo, Puerto Rico to Cork.
Tanaro	United Kingdom	The ship was wrecked on Anticosti Island, Quebec. She was on a voyage from Quebec City to Queenstown, County Cork.
Tempter	United Kingdom	The schooner was driven ashore on Amager, Denmark. She was on a voyage from Kronstadt, Russia to London. She had been refloated by 22 August and taken in to Copenhagen, Denmark.
Threrese and Lina	Sweden	The ship ran aground on the Kaloot Sandbank, in the North Sea. she was on a voyage from Antwerp to Sundsvall.
Thomas Adams	United Kingdom	The steamship ran aground near Berwick upon Tweed, Northumberland. She was on a voyage from Aberdeen to Sunderland, County Durham. She was refloated and resumed her voyage.
Tyne	United Kingdom	The ship ran aground at Kilrush, County Clare. She was on a voyage from Limerick to Quebec City. She was refloated and taken in to the Scattery Roads.
Vanda	United Kingdom	The ship caught fire in the Atlantic Ocean and was abandoned by her crew.
Unnamed	French Navy	The gunboat capsized whilst under tow from Cherbourg, Seine-Inférieure to Dunkirk, Nord. Her crew were rescued by the tug towing her. She was towed in to Havre de Grâce, Seine-Inférieure, where she was righted.
