= Wilkie Sugar Loaf trail =

Hiking trail in Nova Scotia, Canada

Coordinates: 46°57′11.76″N 60°27′39.66″W

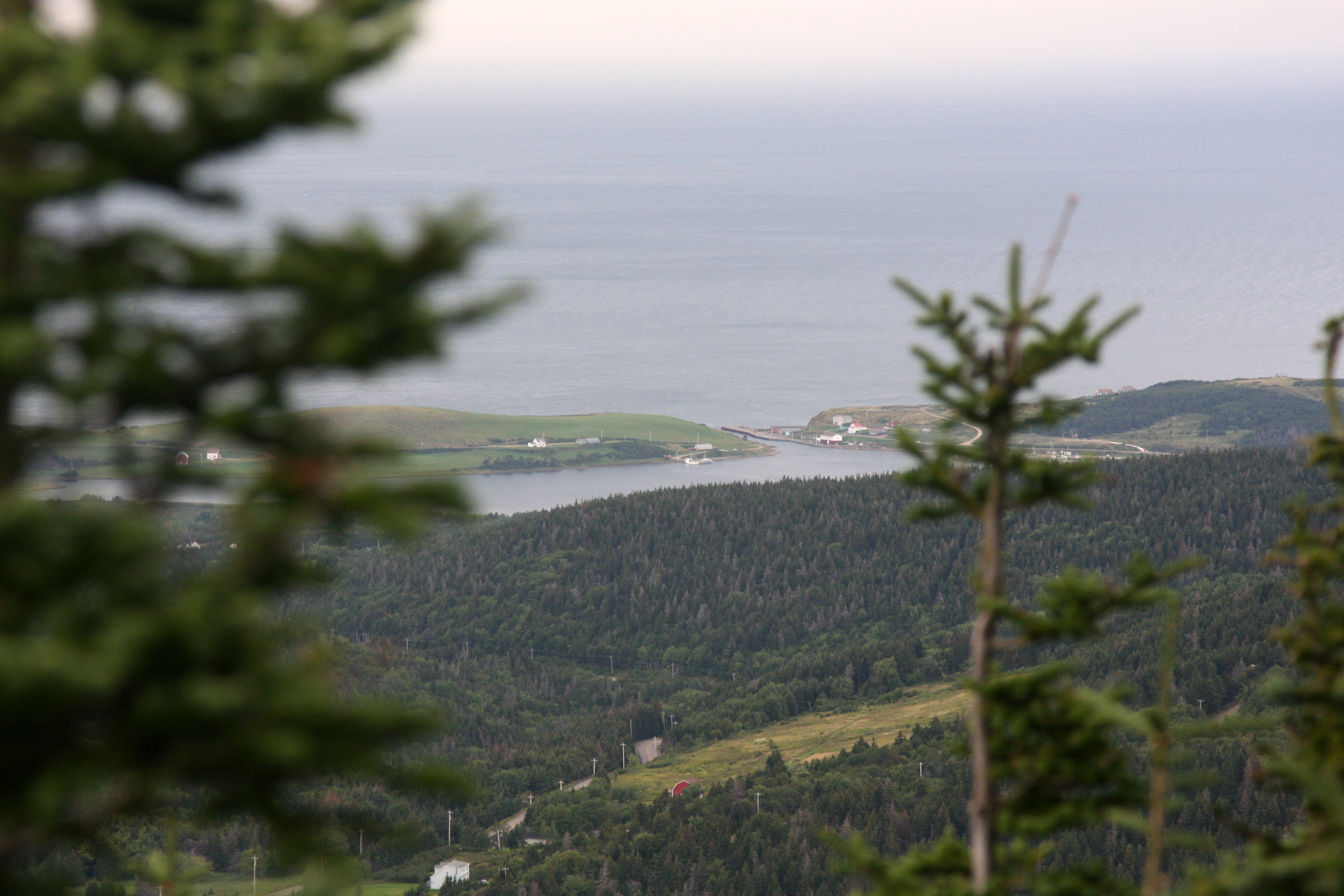
- View from Wilkie Sugar Loaf trail
- Length: About 3.2 kilometres (2.0 mi) (return)
- Location: Cape Breton Highlands
- Trailheads: Bay St. Lawrence Road - 46°57'11.76"N, 60°27'39.66"W (N46 57.196 W060 27.661)
- Use: Hiking
- Elevation gain/loss: 350 metres (1,150 ft)
- Highest point: Wilkie Sugar Loaf, 411.8
- Difficulty: Easy to strenuous
- Season: Early spring to autumn
- Sights: Cape Breton Highlands, Cabot Strait
- Hazards: Severe weather American black bear Tick-borne diseases Mosquitos; Biting flies Steep grades

Wilkie Sugarloaf Trail in Nova Scotia

The Wilkie Sugarloaf Trail is a hiking trail in northern Cape Breton Island in the Canadian province of Nova Scotia. The trail leads to the 411.8 metres (1,351 ft) summit of Wilkie Sugar Loaf in the Cape Breton Highlands.

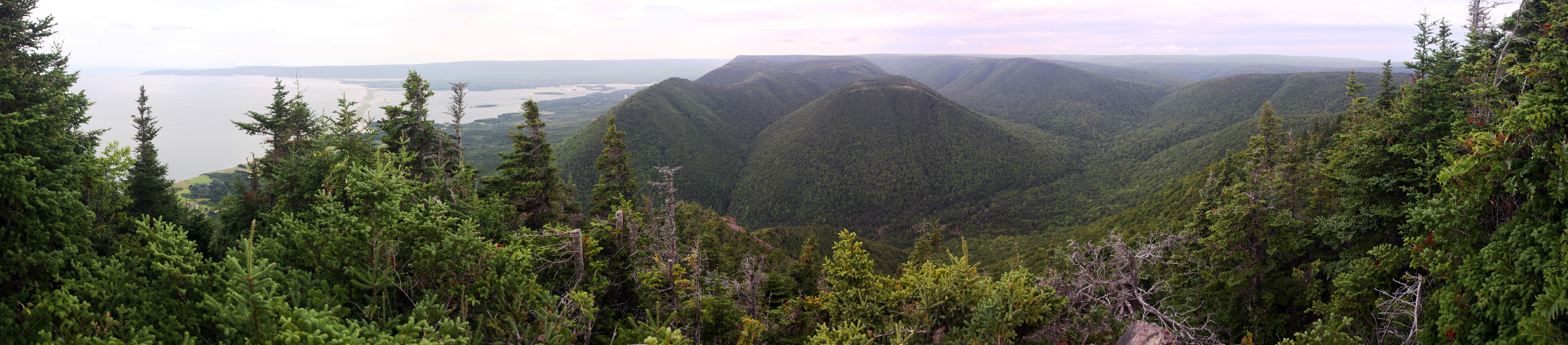
The view south toward Sams Mountain from the Wilkie Sugar Loaf trail South Lookoff, with Aspy Bay and the Aspy Fault off to the left, Zwicker Brook dividing the peaks centre, and the White Brook valley to the right.

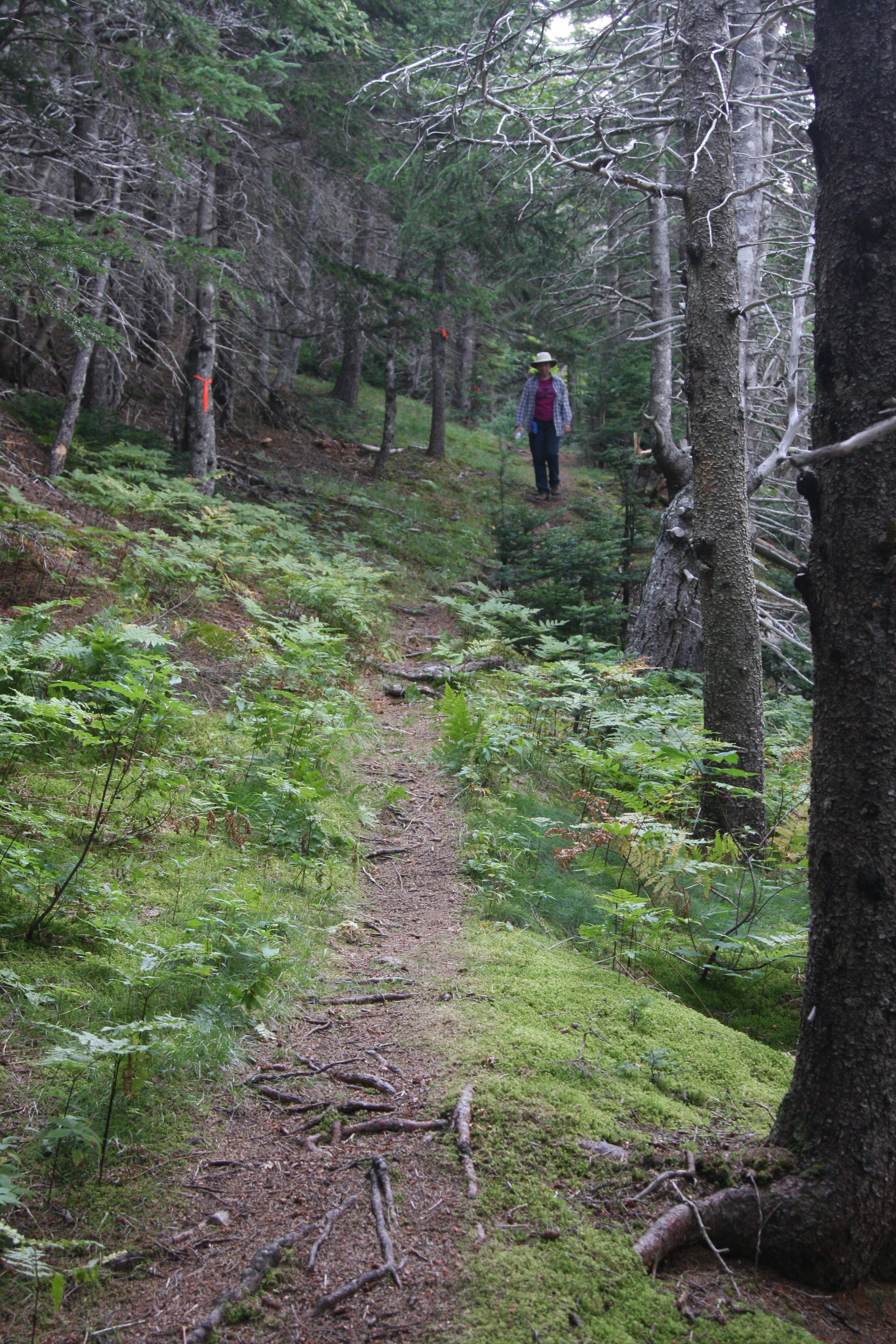
Wilkie Sugar Loaf Trail climbing along the east mountain ridge.

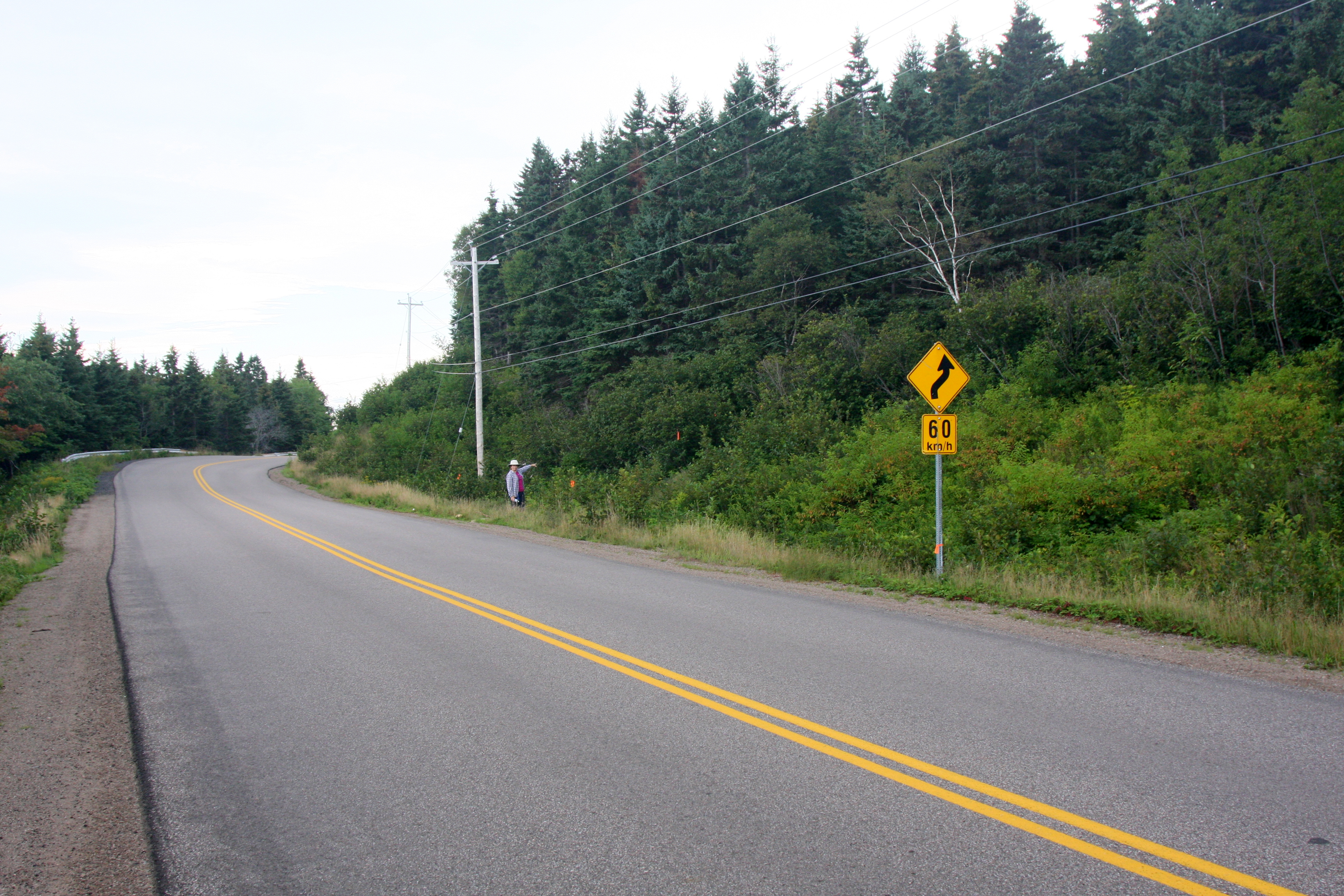
Wilkie Sugar Loaf trail head on Bay St. Lawrence Road.

== Trail outline ==
The trail is approximately 3.2 kilometres (2 mi) (return) in length and is mostly a steady upward climb, rising over 350 metres (1,150 ft) to the peak of Wilkie Sugar Loaf Mountain. The trail offers two different mountain top look-offs. A trail to the summit has existed since at least 1969, probably much earlier.

The south-western look-off presents views toward the Pollets Cove-Aspy Fault Wilderness Area, the Aspy Fault plateau and Aspy Fault to the west, the plateau of the Cape Breton Highlands National Park in the distance to the south, as well as Aspy Harbour, the beach at Cabots Landing and the villages of Cape North and Dingwall to the south and east.

The northern look-off presents a view of the hills to the north and to the hamlets of Bay St. Lawrence and St. Margaret Village, the Bay St. Lawrence and the open Gulf of St. Lawrence beyond. On a very clear day it is possible to see the 115 kilometres (71 mi) across the Cabot Strait to Newfoundland to the north-east.

== Trail access ==
This trail lies on privately owned land and is maintained by local volunteers. The trail is intended for local use only. Wilkie Sugarloaf Trail can be accessed from the Bay St Lawrence Road, 1.15 kilometres (0.71 mi) north of the entrance of Cabots Landing Provincial Park in the community of Sugarloaf, Victoria County.

== Triangulation station ==
A Natural Resources Canada Geodetic Survey Division Station, Unique Number (Station Number): 23107, Station Name "SUGAR LOAF 19659", is located near the summit, consisting of a copper bolt sunk about 1 inch in a standard concrete monument. The remains of an astronomic pier lie about 3 m (9.8 ft) away to the east. In the late 1960s there was a 6 m (20 ft) tall wooden tower on the summit, located over the survey station. While the station can still be found, there are no remains of the tower.

== Cape Breton Highlands 3 Peaks Challenge ==
While Wilkie Sugar Loaf trail has been regularly featured in the annual Hike the Highlands Festival since at least 2007, on July 17, 2010, the Wilkie Sugar Loaf trail was one of three mountain trails featured in the 1st Annual Cape Breton Highlands 3 Peaks Challenge, part of the Hike the Highlands Festival for 2010. 10 teams of 4 hikers climbed Franey, Wilkie Sugar Loaf and Acadien mountains in one day.

July 19, 2014 was the date of the 5th Annual Cape Breton Highlands 3 Peaks Challenge which once again featured Wilkie Sugar Loaf trail when 24 teams of 4 hikers hiked Roberts Mountain, Wilkie Sugar Loaf Mountain and Franey Mountain all in one day. Wilkie Sugar Loaf was voted by the teams as the toughest mountain. The Wilkie Sugar Loaf trail was cleared and re-flagged in early July 2014 in preparation for this event.
