= Wilkie Sugar Loaf =

Mountain in Nova Scotia, Canada

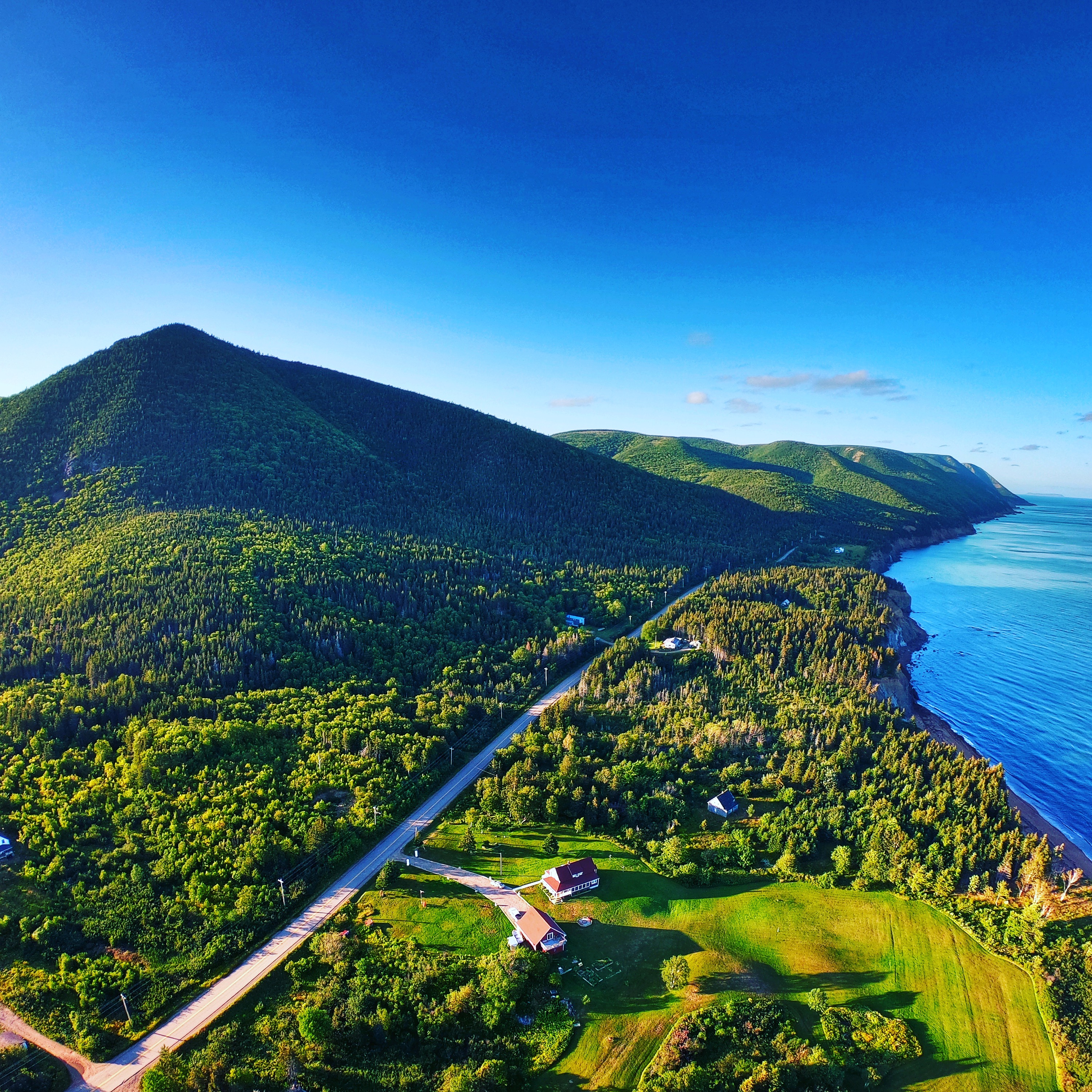

Highest point
- Elevation: 411.8 m (1,351 ft)
- Prominence: 220 m (720 ft)
- Coordinates: 46°57′19″N 60°28′21″W

Naming
- Etymology: family name of pioneer settlers + pyramidal shape of mountain
- Native name: Squa-dichk (Mi'kmaq)

Geography
- Location: Victoria County, Nova Scotia
- Parent range: Cape Breton Highlands
- Topo map: NTS 11K16 Dingwall

Climbing
- Easiest route: Hike

Wilkie Sugar Loaf is a Canadian peak in the Cape Breton Highlands near the community of Sugar Loaf in the province of Nova Scotia.

== Description ==
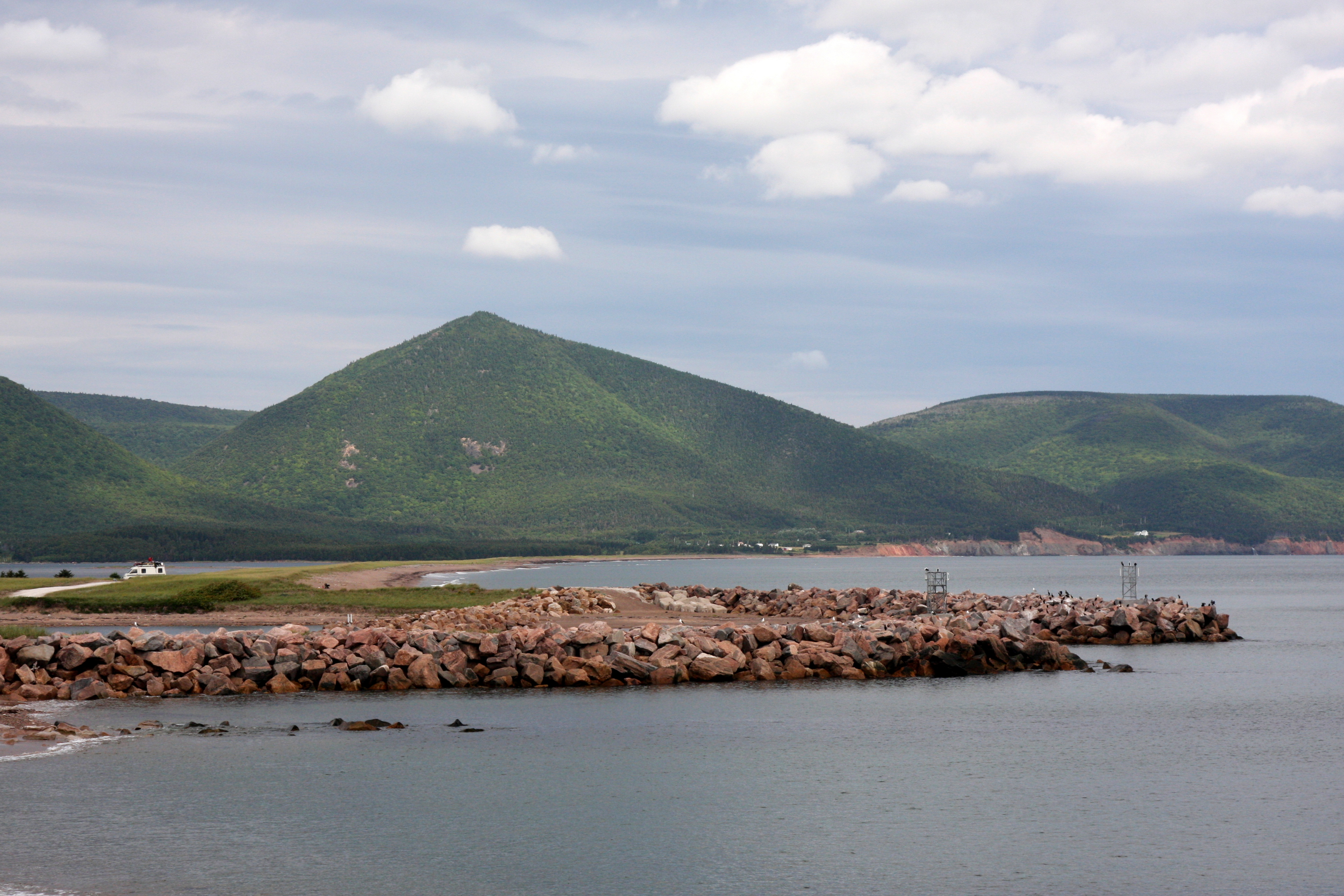
Wilkie Sugar Loaf Mountain, seen from the entrance to Dingwall Harbour in Aspy Bay

Wilkie Sugar Loaf is a forested pyramidal peak rising from the shore of Aspy Bay, 10 kilometres (6.2 mi) north of the Cabot Trail. There are few stand-alone mountaintops in Nova Scotia, but one of these is Wilkie Sugar Loaf, climbing to more than 400 metres/yards above sea level in less than 1.5 kilometers (0.9 mi). This peak belongs to the North Mountain range of hills bordering the Aspy Fault, but has been separated from the rest of the ridge by the deep ravines cut by Wilkie Brook and Polly Brook.

== The name ==
Wilkie Sugar Loaf has been the official name for this mountain since April 21, 1936. The mountain's name is a combination of both "Wilkie," the family name of a pioneer family in who settled in the area in 1820, James Wilkie Jr. was an original land grant recipient in the area in 1852, and "Sugar Loaf", a descriptive name for the mountain's distinct pyramidal shape, which suggests a "sugarloaf". The name Wilkie Sugar Loaf was already in common use in official publications such as Admiralty Charts and Sailing Directions by 1860. The Mi'kmaq name for the mountain was "Squa-dichk," meaning "the highest point."

== Triangulation station ==
A Natural Resources Canada Geodetic Survey Division Station, Unique Number (Station Number): 23107, Station Name "SUGAR LOAF 19659", is located near the summit, consisting of a copper bolt sunk about 1 inch in a standard concrete monument. The remains of an astronomic pier lie about 3 m (9.8 ft) away to the east. In the late 1960s there was a 6 m (20 ft) tall wooden tower on the summit, located over the survey station. While the station can still be found, there are no remains of the tower.

== The trail ==
Access to the summit is possible by hiking the Wilkie Sugar Loaf trail which leads from a trailhead on the west side of the Bay St Lawrence Road, 1.15 kilometres (0.71 mi) north of the entrance of Cabots Landing Provincial Park, to the peak of the mountain, offering views from two mountain top look-offs. One look-off faces toward the Aspy Fault plateau and Aspy Fault including the plateau of the national park in the distance to the south-west as well as the beach at Cabots Landing, Aspy Harbour and the villages of Cape North and Dingwall to the south and east. The second look-off presents a view of the hills to the north and to Bay St. Lawrence and the Gulf of St. Lawrence beyond. On a very clear day it is possible to see all the way to Newfoundland.

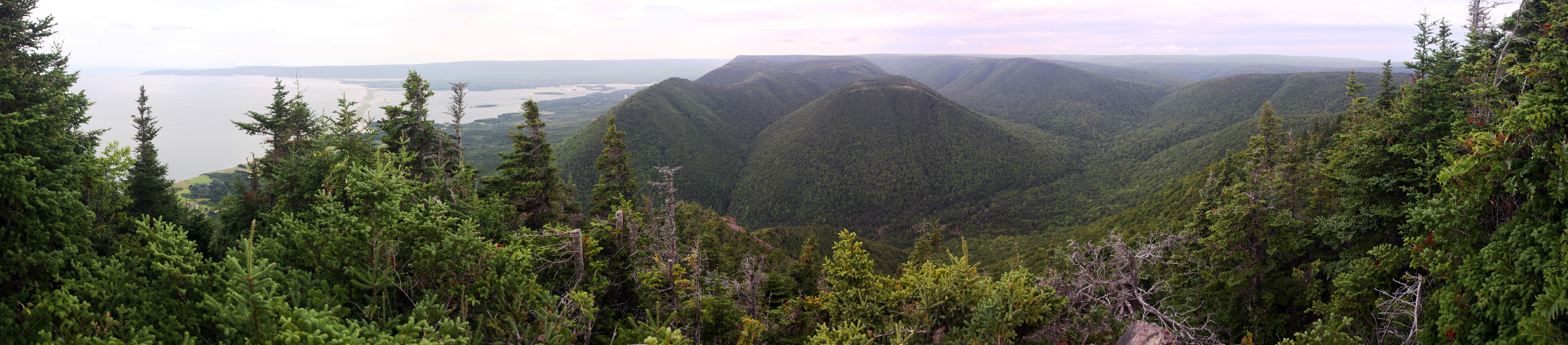
The Cape Breton Highlands, looking south toward Sams Mountain from the Wilkie Sugar Loaf trail South Lookoff. Aspy Bay's North, Middle & South Harbours, and the Aspy Fault off to the left, Zwicker Brook dividing the peaks centre, and the White Brook valley to the right.
