= Aspy River =

Coordinates: 46°53′31.6″N 60°27′19.6″W

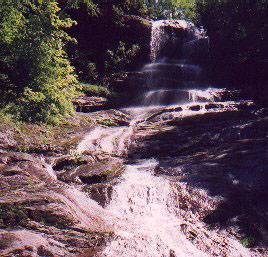
- Beulach Ban waterfall on the Aspy River

Location
- Country: Canada
- Province: Nova Scotia

Physical characteristics
- Mouth
  - location: Aspy Bay
  - elevation: sea level
- Length: 40 km (25 mi)

The Aspy River (/ˈæspi/) is a river on northeastern Cape Breton Island which rises in the Cape Breton Highlands and empties into Aspy Bay. The North Aspy follows the ancient Aspy Fault which extends for 40 km inland from the coast and extends along the upper section of the northeast Margaree River. This geological fault is thought to be a part of the Cabot Fault (Newfoundland)/ Great Glen Fault (Scotland) system of Avalonia.

It is believed by some sources that John Cabot landed at Aspy Bay in 1497. In 1856, a submarine cable was laid across the Cabot Strait from Aspy Bay to Newfoundland establishing a telegraph link between St. John's, Newfoundland and New York City.

A dirt road in Cape Breton Highlands National Park leads to the Beulach Ban falls on the North Aspy River. "Beulach Ban" is Gaelic for "white gorge".

== See also ==
- List of rivers of Nova Scotia
