= Cabots Landing Provincial Park =

Provincial park in Nova Scotia, Canada

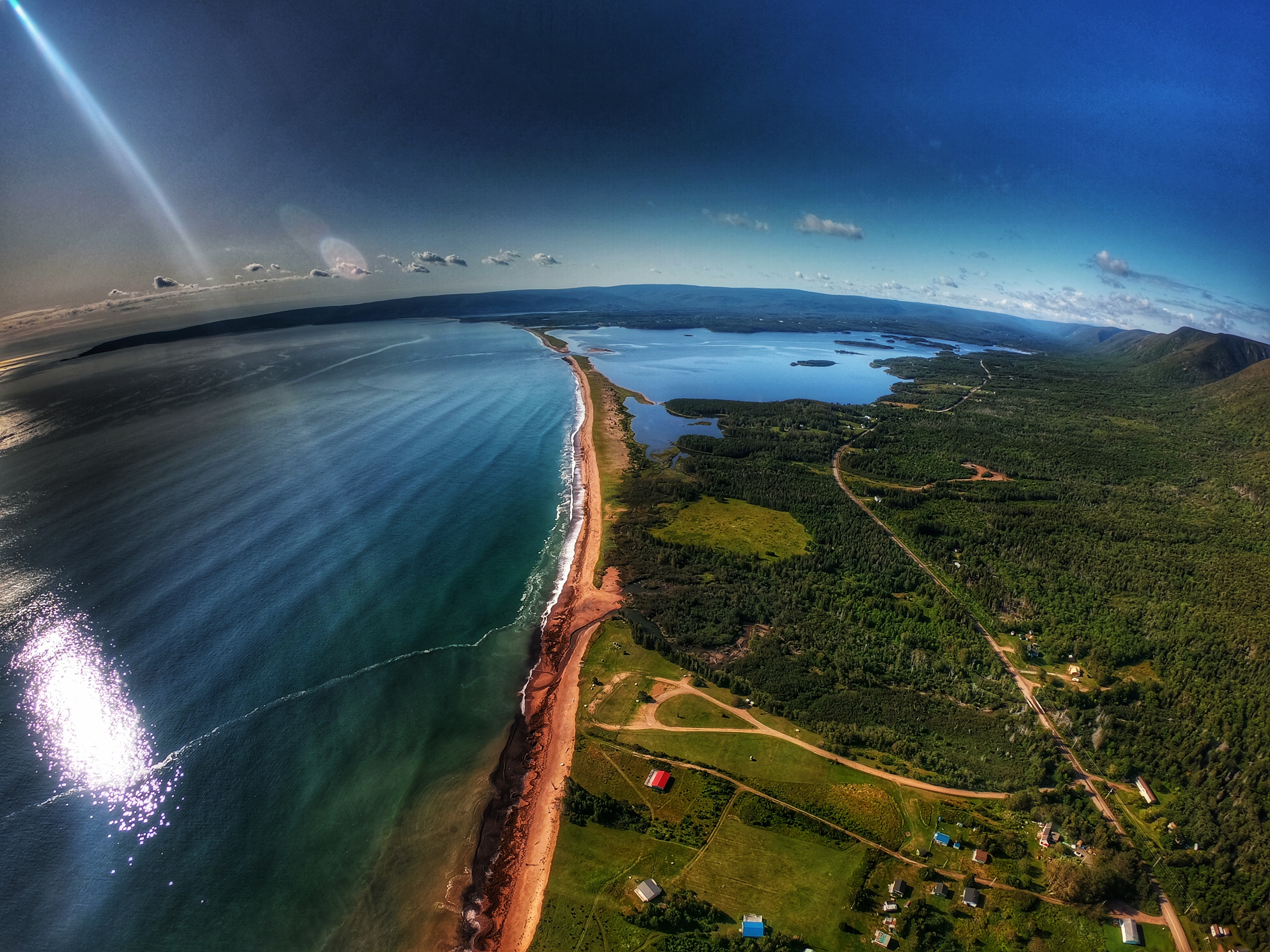
- Cabots Landing Provincial Park
- Interactive map of Cabots Landing Provincial Park
- Type: Provincial park
- Location: Cape Breton Island, Nova Scotia, Canada
- Nearest city: Cape North, Nova Scotia
- Coordinates: 46°56′38.16″N 60°28′0.39″W
- Area: 8.63 hectares (21.3 acres)
- Created: December 19, 1974
- Operator: Parks and Recreation Division, Nova Scotia Department of Natural Resources
- Open: dawn to dusk, from May 15 to October 12, no facilities in winter (parking at gate only)
- Status: Designated; Operational
- Website: Cabots Landing Provincial Park

Cabots Landing Provincial Park (official spelling Cabot's Landing Provincial Park) is a small picnic and beach park on the shore of Aspy Bay in the community of Sugarloaf, 10 kilometres (6.2 mi) north of the Cabot Trail on Cape Breton Island, Nova Scotia, Canada.

The park is managed by the provincial Department of Natural Resources and features picnic tables in an open field on a bluff overlooking a mile-long red sand public beach fronting Aspy Bay, featuring scenic vistas of the steep face of the Pollets Cove-Aspy Fault Wilderness Area.

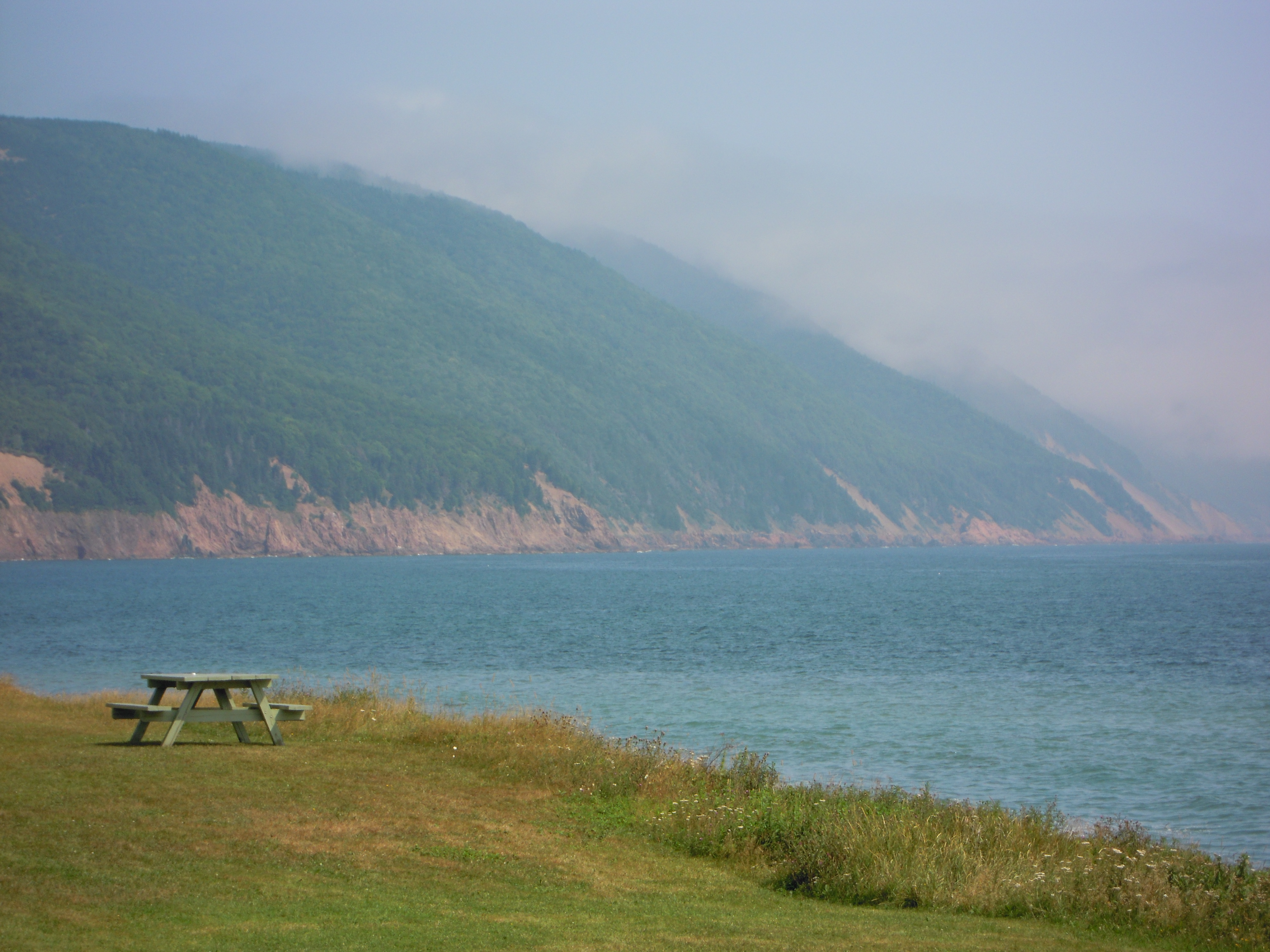
A view from the park looking north

It is believed by some sources that Italian explorer John Cabot (Giovanni Caboto) landed at Aspy Bay in 1497. Cabots Landing Provincial Park features a National Historic Site cairn and bust commemorating the landfall. There is a pioneer cemetery in the park. Cabots Landing Provincial Park was established by Order in Council (OIC) 74-1378 on December 19, 1974.

Located nearby, the Wilkie Sugar Loaf trail can be accessed from the Bay St Lawrence Road, 1.15 kilometres (0.71 mi) north of the entrance to Cabots Landing Provincial Park. The trailhead is at 46°57'11.76"N, 60°27'39.66"W (N46 57.196 W060 27.661) and is marked by orange flagging tape and two yellow stones. The trail is approximately 3 kilometres (2 mi) (return) in length and is mostly a steady upward climb, rising over 350 metres (1,150 ft) to the peak of Wilkie Sugar Loaf Mountain. The trail offers two different mountain-top overlooks. This trail lies on privately owned land.

The park is open for day use (from dawn to dusk), from May 15 to October 12.

Civic address: 1904 Bay St. Lawrence Rd., Sugarloaf, Nova Scotia.
