= ASPI =

ASPI may refer to:

- Advanced SCSI Programming Interface, a standardized programming interface for SCSI devices
- All Share Price Index, a stock indices of the Colombo Stock Exchange in Sri Lanka
- Australian Strategic Policy Institute, a government defence and strategic policy think tank
- Asia Society Policy Institute, a non-profit organization that focuses on educating the world about Asia
- Autostrade per l'Italia, the largest operator of toll roads in Italy

== See also ==
- Aspie, a person with Asperger syndrome
- Aspy (disambiguation)
