= St. Paul Island (Nova Scotia) =

Island in Nova Scotia, Canada

Coordinates: 47°12′10″N 60°09′03″W

Saint Paul Island
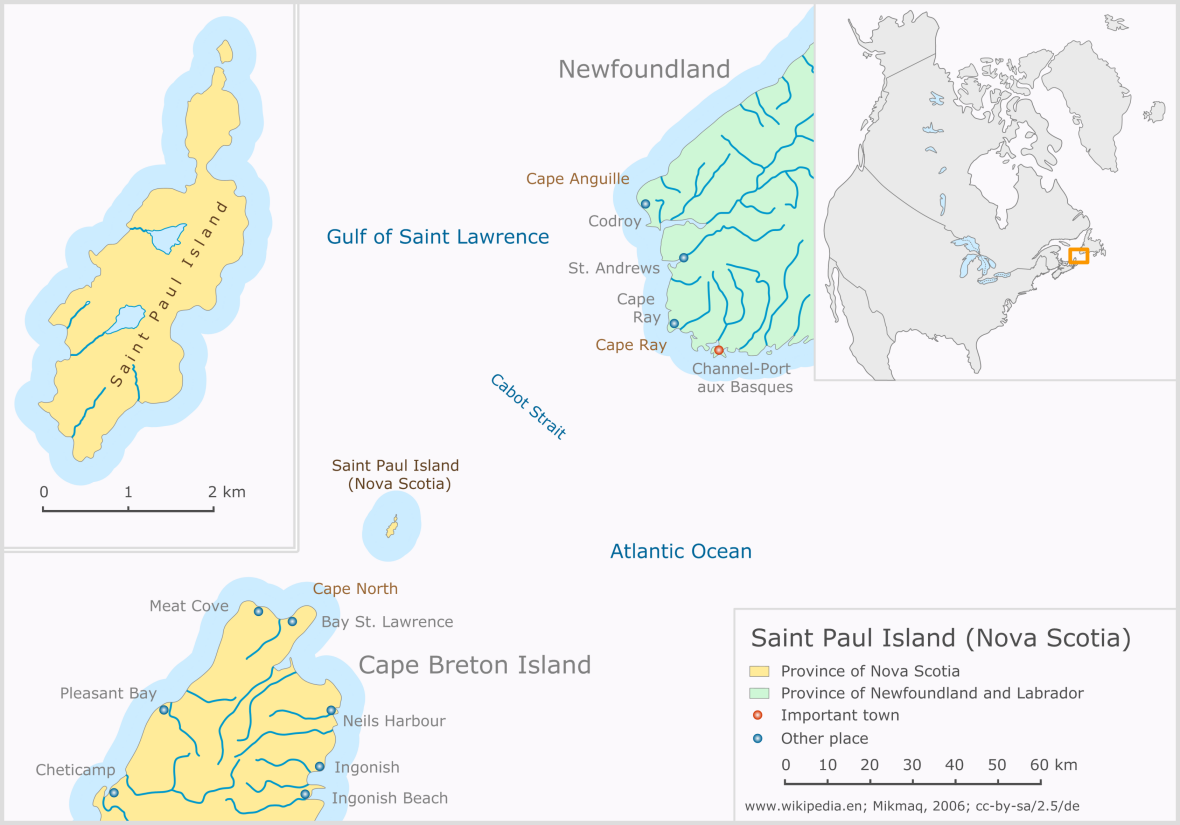

Geography
- Location: Cape Breton, Nova Scotia, Canada
- Length: 4.8 km (2.98 mi)
- Width: 1.6 km (0.99 mi)
- Highest elevation: 147 m (482 ft)

St. Paul Island (French: Île Saint-Paul) is an uninhabited island located approximately 24 km (15 mi) northeast of Cape North on Cape Breton Island and 71 km (44 mi) southwest of Cape Ray on Newfoundland; it is along the boundary between the Gulf of St. Lawrence and the Cabot Strait.

== Overview ==
An extension of the Appalachian Mountains and the Cape Breton Highlands, the highest point on St. Paul Island is 147 m (482 ft) atop "Croggan Mountain".

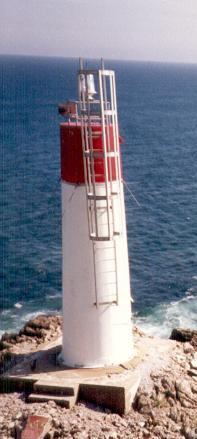
Spraycan Lighthouse

St. Paul Island is approximately 4.8 km (3.0 mi) long by 1.6 km (0.99 mi) wide at its widest point. It is formed of granite and is extremely rugged with its shores being completely encircled by rockface cliffs. It is split by a narrow channel that fills with sea water. The only land mammals inhabiting the island are originally domesticated rabbits, which were set loose after the lifesaving station was established in the late 1800s (the ramp and massive rowboat for 10 men were still there in 1950/51 as well as an enormous house including a dam forming a fresh water reservoir also used by the radio range station operators and families up to the 1950s). The remains of a WWII RCAF radar station were also still there facing the landing area in 1950/51. It is also inhabited by numerous seabirds. There are also two small lakes in the interior stocked with trout. Its ecosystem is considered fragile and due to the danger posed by visiting the island, visits must be cleared beforehand with the Canadian Coast Guard which administers the island on behalf of its owner, the Government of Canada.

During the Age of Sail the island earned the nickname the "Graveyard of the Gulf" (of St. Lawrence) as it is fog-bound throughout much of the navigation season and posed a significant hazard.

A lighthouse was first established on the island in 1839. This lighthouse burned down in 1916. It was replaced by a cast iron cylindrical lighthouse in 1917. This was in turn replaced by an automated system in 1962.

With the light station now automated using solar power, the island sees few visitors, aside from Canadian Coast Guard helicopters on maintenance trips. The island used to host a Marconi wireless station and it still sees occasional amateur radio operators who use the callsign prefix CY9. Other visitors include birdwatchers and SCUBA divers.

The island has been designated an Important Bird Area, and became a National Wildlife Area in 2025.

== Climate ==
St Paul Island experiences a marine influenced humid continental climate (Dfb). On rare occasions, the temperature can rise rapidly and briefly when southwesterly winds blowing offshore from mainland Cape Breton reach the island. The highest temperature ever recorded on St Paul Island was 30.0 °C (86 °F) on 14 August 1944. The coldest temperature ever recorded was −23.3 °C (−10 °F) on 29 December 1933, 10 February 1934, and 6 February 1950.

Climate data for St. Paul Island, 1991–2020 normals, extremes 1928–present
Month	Jan	Feb	Mar	Apr	May	Jun	Jul	Aug	Sep	Oct	Nov	Dec	Year
Record high °C (°F)	16.5 (61.7)	12.8 (55.0)	13.9 (57.0)	17.5 (63.5)	22.2 (72.0)	26.7 (80.1)	28.3 (82.9)	30.0 (86.0)	26.7 (80.1)	23.3 (73.9)	19.9 (67.8)	14.9 (58.8)	30.0 (86.0)
Mean daily maximum °C (°F)	−0.4 (31.3)	−2.0 (28.4)	−0.3 (31.5)	3.1 (37.6)	7.9 (46.2)	13.1 (55.6)	19.0 (66.2)	19.9 (67.8)	16.6 (61.9)	11.3 (52.3)	6.6 (43.9)	2.4 (36.3)	8.1 (46.6)
Daily mean °C (°F)	−3.1 (26.4)	−4.5 (23.9)	−2.6 (27.3)	1.1 (34.0)	5.6 (42.1)	10.5 (50.9)	16.6 (61.9)	18.1 (64.6)	14.6 (58.3)	9.4 (48.9)	4.7 (40.5)	0.3 (32.5)	5.9 (42.6)
Mean daily minimum °C (°F)	−5.7 (21.7)	−7.1 (19.2)	−4.9 (23.2)	−0.9 (30.4)	3.1 (37.6)	8.0 (46.4)	14.2 (57.6)	16.2 (61.2)	12.5 (54.5)	7.7 (45.9)	2.5 (36.5)	−1.9 (28.6)	3.7 (38.7)
Record low °C (°F)	−22.8 (−9.0)	−23.3 (−9.9)	−21.7 (−7.1)	−14.4 (6.1)	−3.9 (25.0)	−0.6 (30.9)	4.4 (39.9)	5.6 (42.1)	2.8 (37.0)	−4.4 (24.1)	−11.1 (12.0)	−23.3 (−9.9)	−23.3 (−9.9)
Average precipitation mm (inches)	108.9 (4.29)	87.8 (3.46)	86.2 (3.39)	92.7 (3.65)	93.2 (3.67)	97.2 (3.83)	94.0 (3.70)	108.0 (4.25)	103.2 (4.06)	122.2 (4.81)	138.2 (5.44)	120.0 (4.72)	1,251.6 (49.27)
Average snowfall cm (inches)	58 (23)	65 (26)	46 (18)	21 (8.3)	2 (0.8)	0 (0)	0 (0)	0 (0)	0 (0)	0 (0)	9 (3.5)	52 (20)	253 (99.6)
Average relative humidity (%)	94	96	95	94	90	89	90	89	89	88	91	93	92
Average dew point °C (°F)	−5 (23)	−7 (19)	−4 (25)	0 (32)	2 (36)	7 (45)	13 (55)	15 (59)	12 (54)	7 (45)	2 (36)	−2 (28)	3 (38)
Mean daily daylight hours	9.6	10.9	12.5	14.2	15.7	16.5	16.1	14.7	13	11.3	9.9	9.1	12.8
Source 1: Environment Canada
Source 2: Weatherbase, Climate Charts(Precipitation 1994-2022)
