= Charles-René Dejordy de Villebon =

Charles-Rene Dejordy de Villebon (June 12, 1715 – November 15, 1761) was from Saint-Sulpice, Quebec. He was a military man, joining the colonial regular troops as a cadet. By 1749 he had been promoted to second ensign and was sent as second in command to a post in Baie-des-Puants, Wisconsin. In 1756 he was promoted to ensign and was immediately active in two campaigns in the Seven Years' War.

In 1757 he had relocated to the western forts and partnered with Louis-Joseph Gaultier de La Vérendrye who was ending a three-year leasing arrangement of these forts. In 1758–1760, he took over the financial burden of the fur monopoly as the last of the western commanders, Louis-Joseph being his predecessor. This was a time of war and six of the eight French posts were either destroyed by Indians loyal to the English or abandoned by the Canadiens. The two main centres, Fort Dauphin and Fort La Reine, survived and had new occupants after 1760. Dejordy left the west when travel permitted in 1760 before the end of his term.

In 1761 he and his family were leaving Montreal for France. He, his wife, his sister and his three children died of the coast off Cape Breton aboard the ship Auguste. At his departure time and that immediately following, the confusion surrounding the conquest of Canada had him accused of some serious crimes of which, in all likelihood, he was innocent.
