= Pollett's Cove =

Cove on Cape Breton Island, Nova Scotia

Coordinates: 46.918°N 60.689°W

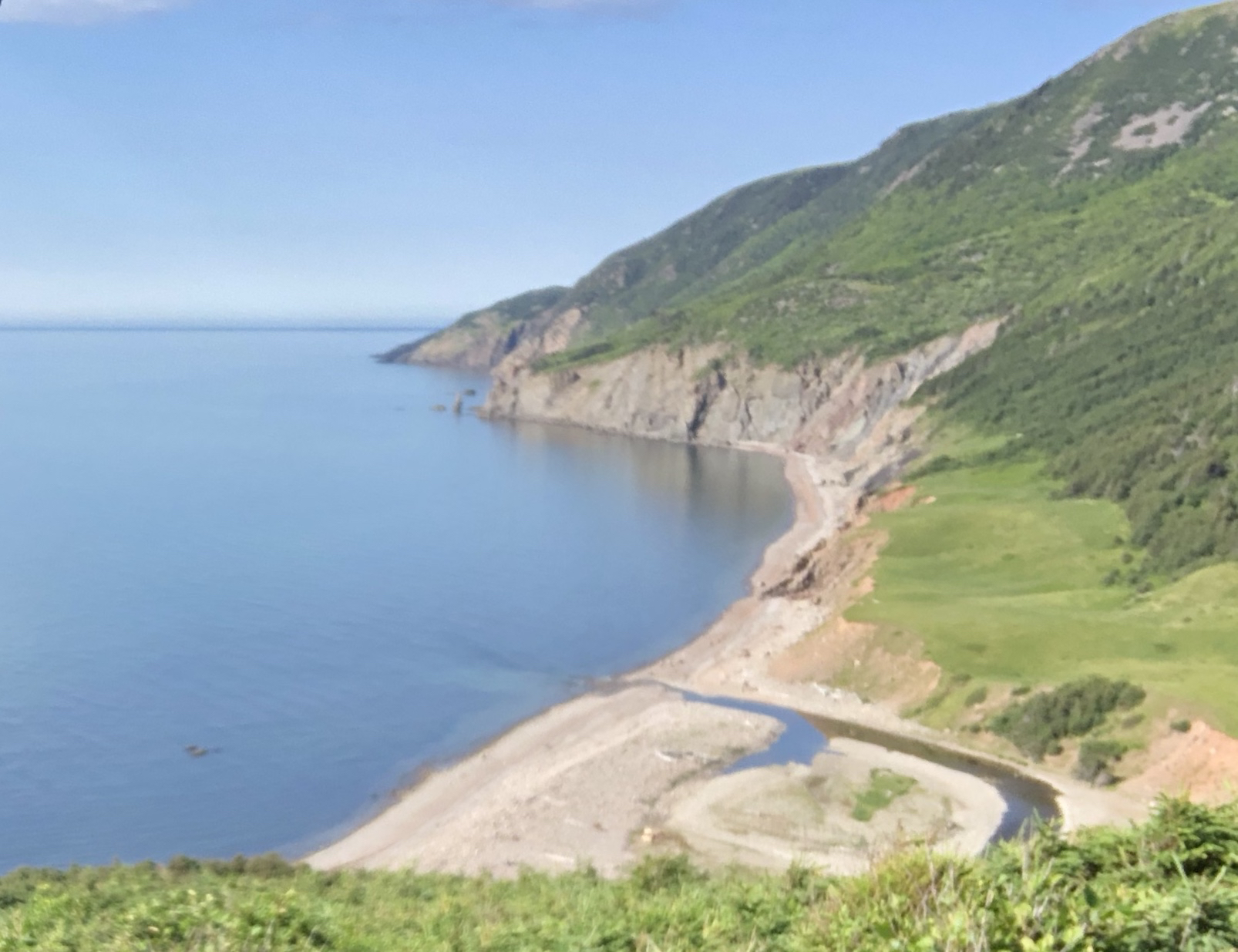
Pollett's Cove, Nova Scotia

Pollett's Cove is a cove on the northwest coast of Cape Breton Island, Nova Scotia. It is accessible only by boat or on foot via a 10 km hike along the coastline from Pleasant Bay. It has a 1000-metre, sandy beach at the base of a valley formed by the confluence of Pollett's Cove Brook and another smaller stream. After joining about 1,000 metres above the beach, the streams flow down through a grassy meadow to the Gulf of St. Lawrence.

== History ==
Pollett's Cove was first inhabited by the Mi'kmaq. During the American Revolution, Ensign S.W. Prenties of the 84th Regiment of Foot wrote the first recorded description of the village. This account is included in Prenties' book about being shipwrecked off the coast of Cape Breton and being saved by Mi'kmaq (1780).

The community was first settled by Europeans in 1838. The first European settler to arrive at Pollett's Cove was Donald McLean and his three sons. They were from Scotland and spoke Gaelic. Around 1861, upon returning from Bay St. Lawrence, two of McLean's sons drowned a few hundred yards from the Cove leaving behind their wives and children. (One of these sons was Duncan who was issued the first land grant in the Cove in 1861).

By 1887, there were six families living in the Cove and 9 years later two more families joined the community. These eight families lived in seven houses (1901). There was a post office in the Cove for twenty years (1896-1916) as well as a school and "lobster factory". (There are at least two burial grounds from this period that have preserved gravestone markers.) The 1921 census indicates there was one family in the cove. Another family lived in the Cove for a few years in the 1930s after which the community was likely abandoned.

During World War I Pollett's Cove was connected by a telegraph wire to the rest of Nova Scotia, to warn of German U-boats entering the Gulf of St.Lawrence. In 1947, wildfires burned the abandoned buildings in Pollett's Cove.

== Preservation ==
The cove is surrounded by the Cape Breton Highlands. The surrounding land is owned by the province, and has protected wilderness status.

In August, 2007, the owners of the main parcel of private land put it up for sale, after failing to conclude negotiations for its purchase by the province. Pollett's Cove is now privately owned by a citizen of nearby Red River.

== Gallery ==
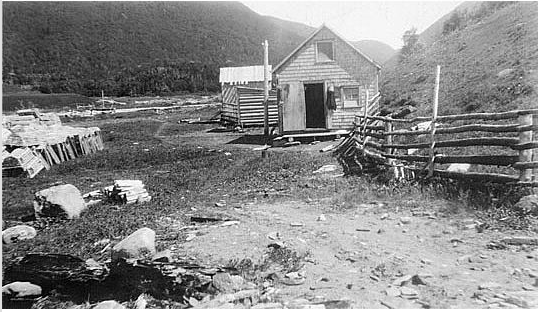
Pollett's Cove by Clara Dennis (c. 1935), Nova Scotia Archives, Canada

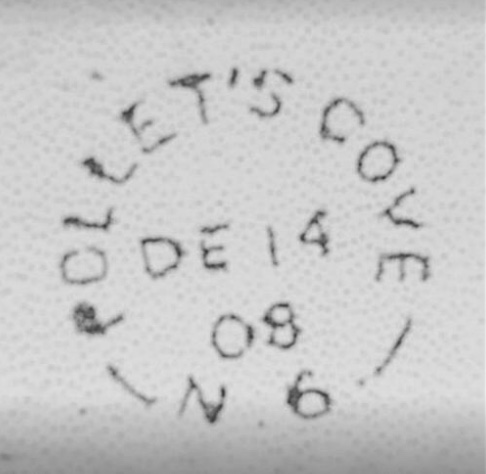
Postmark for Pollett's Cove

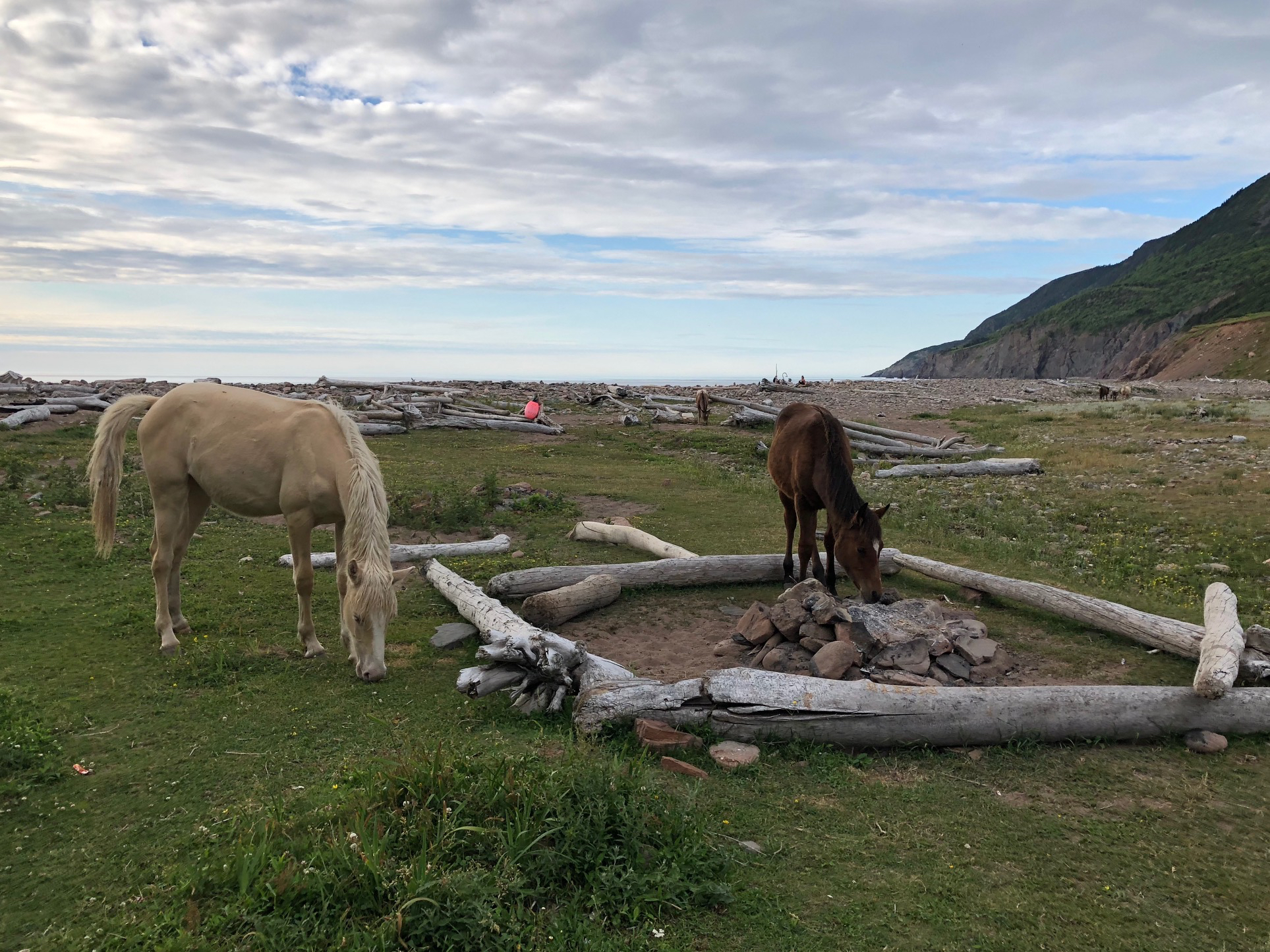
Horses, Pollett's Cove
