= Dingwall, Nova Scotia =

Community in Nova Scotia, Canada

Coordinates: 46°53′41″N 60°28′13″W

Dingwall in Nova Scotia

Dingwall (Scottish Gaelic: Inbhir Pheofharain) is an unincorporated area of approximately 600 residents in the Aspy Bay region of the Municipality of the County of Victoria, Nova Scotia, Canada. It is situated just off the Cabot Trail, 84.68 kilometers northeast of county seat Baddeck. The federal electoral riding is Sydney—Victoria.

== History ==
Dingwall was founded as Young's Cove in the late 1820s, an carried that name until 1883. One of the first settlers and land grantees was Walter Young in 1827, and the community that emerged around him came to bear his name. Young had a Brig of 147 tonnes build in 1847, named the Richard Brown which Young utilized as a cargo ship. The Richard Brown was at one time believed to have been lost at sea in a gale while on a voyage from Sydney to Halifax, but despite heavy damage reached its destination after being blown far off course.

Later, in the late 1870s, merchant Robert Dingwall settled in Young's Cove and opened a general store. Mr. Dingwall soon made an application for a post office and then lobbied the government to change the town's name. By provincial statute chapter 55 in 1883, the name of Young's Cove was thus changed to Dingwall. Old Norse in origin, the name "Dingwall" comes from Ting (parliament) and Voir (valley).

== Overview ==
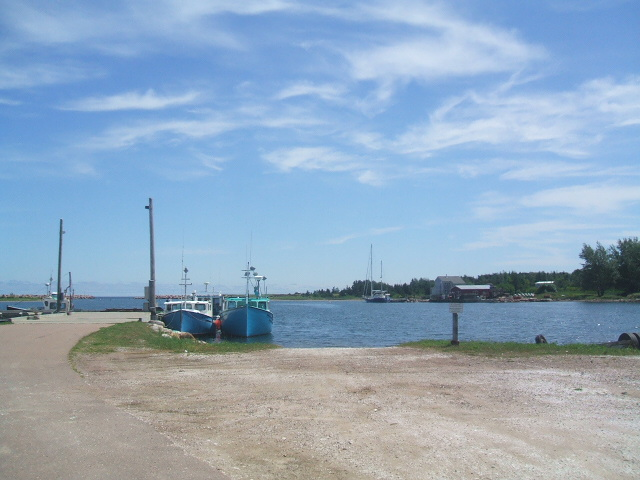
Cape Islander fishing vessels at Dingwall Harbour in 2010

Located on northeastern Cape Breton Island in the Aspy Bay, Dingwall has traditionally been a fishing community, which remains the town's primary industry, along with tourism. St. Joseph's Roman Catholic Church was opened in 1901 and rebuilt in the mid-1980s after being destroyed by arson.

Dingwall was once a somewhat booming industrial town in the early 20th century when it was home to the National Gypsum Company Quarries, the remnants of which are still quite prominent within the town. The Dingwall quarry was in full production after World War II, but harsh winters and a shallow port limited production to the months of May through November. Each spring the channel had to be dredged and, toward the end of the shipping season, cargo size was reduced to keep the vessels afloat. Dingwall's gypsum deposit was last worked in 1955. Once the gypsum boom had run its course, many residents moved elsewhere to find employment.

In 1960 the Department of Public Works of Canada requested the National Research Council (Canada) devise a means of reducing sediment deposition in the harbour entrance caused by the littoral drift on a bar in front of the entrance. Prior to this, shoaling of the entrance of this harbour was so severe that it was often possible to walk across the harbour entrance in rubber boots within a few months of completion of dredging to a depth of 13 feet. Model studies were carried out and a breakwater configuration was evolved which appeared to have some "selfdredging" characteristics. The recommended structures were built in 1962 and over time appeared to be successful in maintaining minimum depths of 5 feet at low tide which was adequate for the fishing fleet using the harbour at the time. Based upon the Dingwall channel design, entrance structures were later built at Inverness, Nova Scotia in 1965 and at Pleasant Bay, Nova Scotia in 1967.

Swordfishing was carried out extensively in Dingwall and other communities North of Smokey from the 1930s to the 1980s. Swordfish were so plentiful that boats traveled from Yarmouth, Nova Scotia and as far as the United States to fish. The season would start in late July and would run until late September, sometimes October.

In 2010, plans were announced to repatriate the St. Paul Island lighthouse to the St. Paul Island Museum in Dingwall. St. Paul is an uninhabited island located about 24 kilometres northeast of Dingwall. Built in 1917, the lighthouse guided ships through the Gulf of St. Lawrence for approximately 100 years before being moved to Dartmouth at the Canadian Coast Guard Maritime base.

== Communications ==
- The Postal Code is B0C 1G0
- The Telephone exchange is 902-383-xxxx
- Internet - DSL provided by Bell Aliant
