= Auguste (1758 ship) =

History

France
- Name: Auguste

Great Britain
- Name: Auguste
- Acquired: Captured from the French, 1758
- Fate: Sank at Aspy Bay, Cape Breton Island, Nova Scotia, November 15, 1761

General characteristics
- Tonnage: 245
- Length: 70 ft (21 m)
- Sail plan: Full Rigged Ship

Auguste was a full-rigged sailing ship that sank at Aspy Bay, Cape Breton, Nova Scotia in 1761 while carrying exiles from the fall of New France. Auguste was a former French privateer ship which had been captured by the British and converted to a merchant ship. In September 1761, she was hired by the British government to transport French exiles and prisoners of war from Montreal to France. For the voyage, she was under the command of Joseph Knowles, an English sea captain. The ship was unarmed and carried 121 passengers and crew. Almost immediately upon clearing the mouth of the St. Lawrence on October 28, she encountered a week of contrary winds followed by a nor'west gale and heavy seas which badly damaged the ship. Leaking heavily with an exhausted crew and damaged rigging, the captain sought a sheltered harbour in Cape Breton, Nova Scotia. However Knowles was unable to find a safe refuge as Auguste carried only charts of the French coast. The ship struck land on the northeastern side of Cape Breton Island near an inlet known as Aspy Bay. Only seven of the 121 made it to shore alive. These included the captain, the merchant Luc de la Corne, two soldiers, two servants, and one discharged soldier.

Many notable Canadians died during the sinking, including Charles-René Dejordy de Villebon, Louis-Joseph Gaultier de La Vérendrye, and Louis de la Corne, Chevalier de la Corne.

Carrying the life's savings of many of its passengers, the ship contained considerable amounts of gold and silver. This has attracted various treasure hunters, including Joe Amaral, as well as some archaeology by Parks Canada. A display of artifacts from Auguste is featured in the "Shipwreck Treasures of Nova Scotia" exhibit at the Maritime Museum of the Atlantic in Halifax recovered by various divers including Offshore Diving and Salvage of Sydney, NS owned by Gerald Langille and Edward Barrington's 1977-78 expedition.

The documentary A Treasure ship's tragedy, on the National Geographic Channel, mentions the wreck of Auguste.
