= Luc de la Corne =

Canadian military officer and merchant (c. 1711–1784)

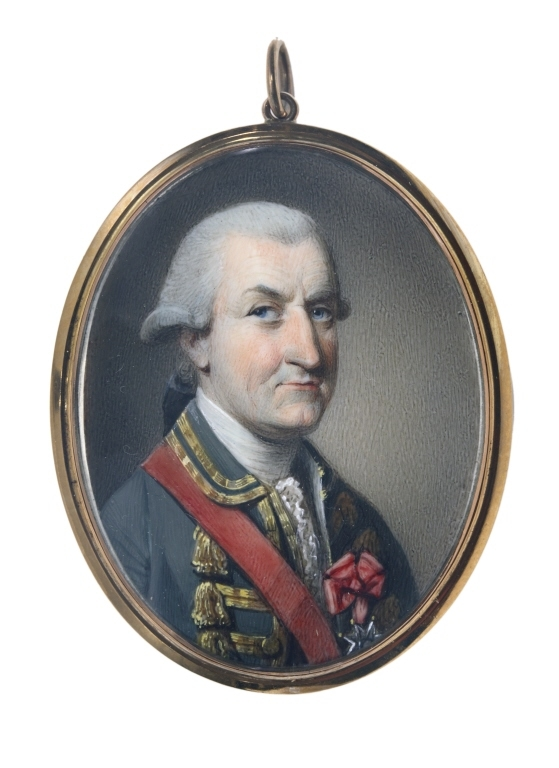
- Born: c. 1711; Contrecœur, Quebec
- Died: October 1, 1784 (aged 72-73); Montreal, Quebec

Luc de la Corne (c. 1711 – October 1, 1784) was a Canadian-born military officer, merchant, interpreter and politician.

== Life ==
Luc de la Corne was born c. 1711 in Contrecœur, Quebec, then part of the French colony of Canada. Born into a "large and illustrious family", his parents were Jean-Louis de La Corne de Chaptes and Marie Pécaudy de Contrecœur, both of whom were French Canadians. Saint-Luc was an officer in the Compagnies Franches de la Marine; his brother Louis de la Corne, Chevalier de la Corne, later became a very successful merchant at Montreal. Though relatively unknown, he played a major role in American and Canadian history. He is most famous for returning from the shipwreck of the Auguste off the coast of Cape Breton, Nova Scotia, at the age of fifty, during the dead of winter, to Quebec City - a trek of 700 miles (1,125 kilometres). He had a varied and courageous military career which earned him the cross of Saint Louis in 1759. He fought at both the Battle of Fort William Henry during the French and Indian War and at the Battles of Saratoga during the American Revolutionary War.

He became a very successful merchant and was heavily involved in the Montreal end of the fur trade. His brother, Jean-Louis, was heavily involved in the fur trade and exploration and Luc controlled the eastern end of his activities. Another brother, François-Josué de La Corne was the commandant of Fort Kaministiquia for a time and large fur trade profits were realized. He was in partnership with Louis-Joseph Gaultier de La Vérendrye for three years south of Lake Superior. In the same period his brother, Louis de la Corne was commandant of the western forts founded mainly by the elder La Vérendrye. Most of his ventures made large profits and, at the time of his death, he was one of the richest men in Canada. Luc de la Corne was an interpreter for Louis-Joseph de Montcalm at the Massacre of Fort William Henry. Saint Luc was held partially responsible for the attack on the British troops and was dismissed.

In 1761, Luc was returning to France, when his ship Auguste ran into terrible weather and sank. The seven survivors endured some terrible hardships but eventually found themselves back in Montreal. The feat made Saint Luc de la Corne famous in Quebec. During the American Revolution War, Saint Luc reappeared as an interpreter for John Burgoyne during his trek to Saratoga. During this campaign two natives of Saint Luc's detachment were found responsible for the killing of Jane McCrea.
