= South Harbour, Nova Scotia =

Community in Nova Scotia, Canada

Coordinates: 46°51′43.03″N 60°27′57.61″W

South Harbour in Nova Scotia

South Harbour is an unincorporated area in the Municipality of the County of Victoria, Cape Breton Island, Nova Scotia, Canada. It is on the Cabot Trail, and borders the Cape Breton Highlands National Park.

The earliest European-descended settlers were English and Irish families who arrived around 1830. A second wave of Scottish settlers arrived in the area approximately 40 years later. A schoolhouse was established in the community in 1883.

South Harbour is a misnomer since the sole outlet of the “harbour” is a channel through a sandbar, too small for commercial watercraft to traverse. The water is brackish, being fed by Effie's brook and Glasgow brook. Oysters and mussels are harvested in the harbour. A quarry and asphalt plant are also located in the community.

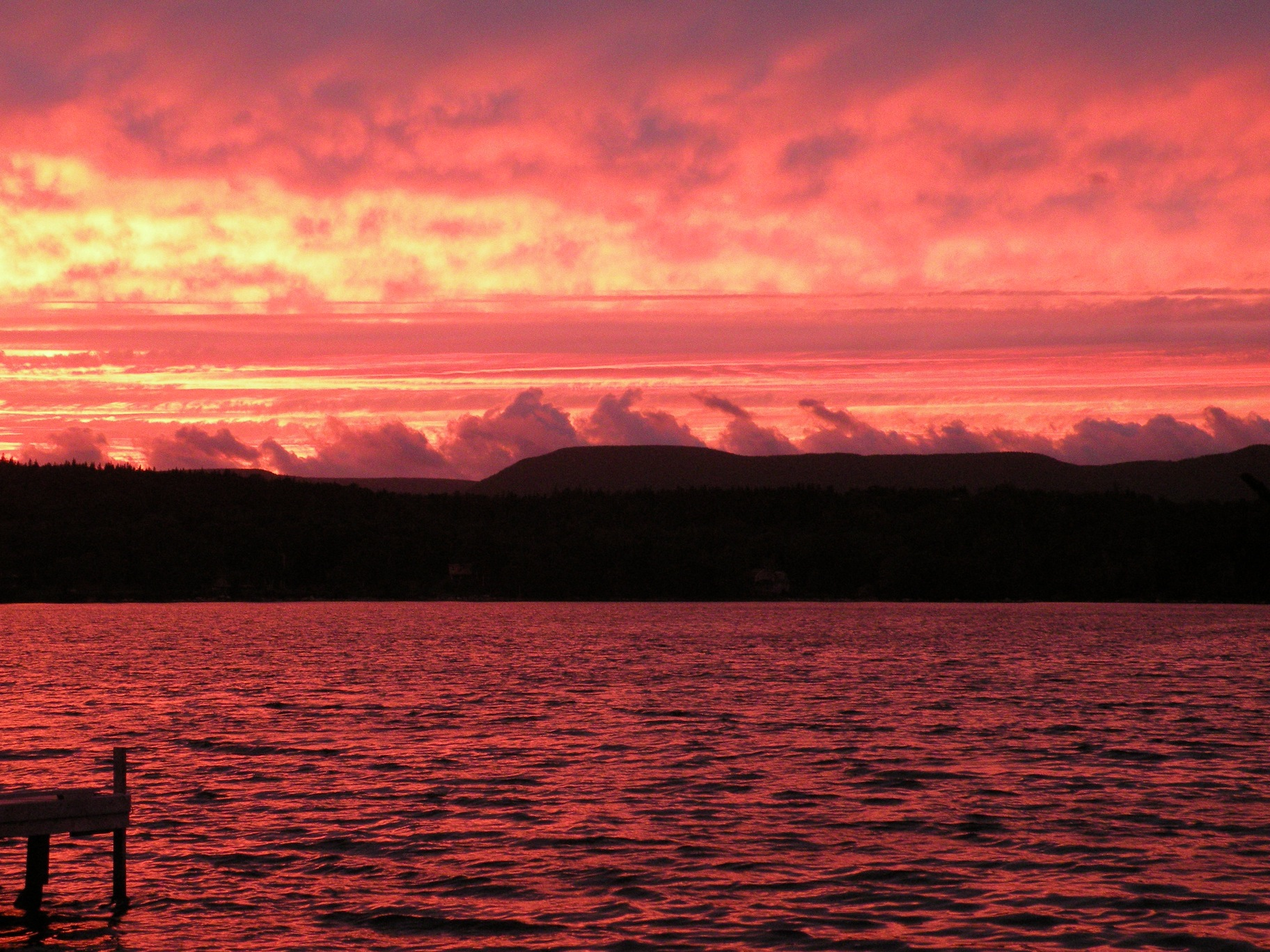
Sunset over South Harbour.

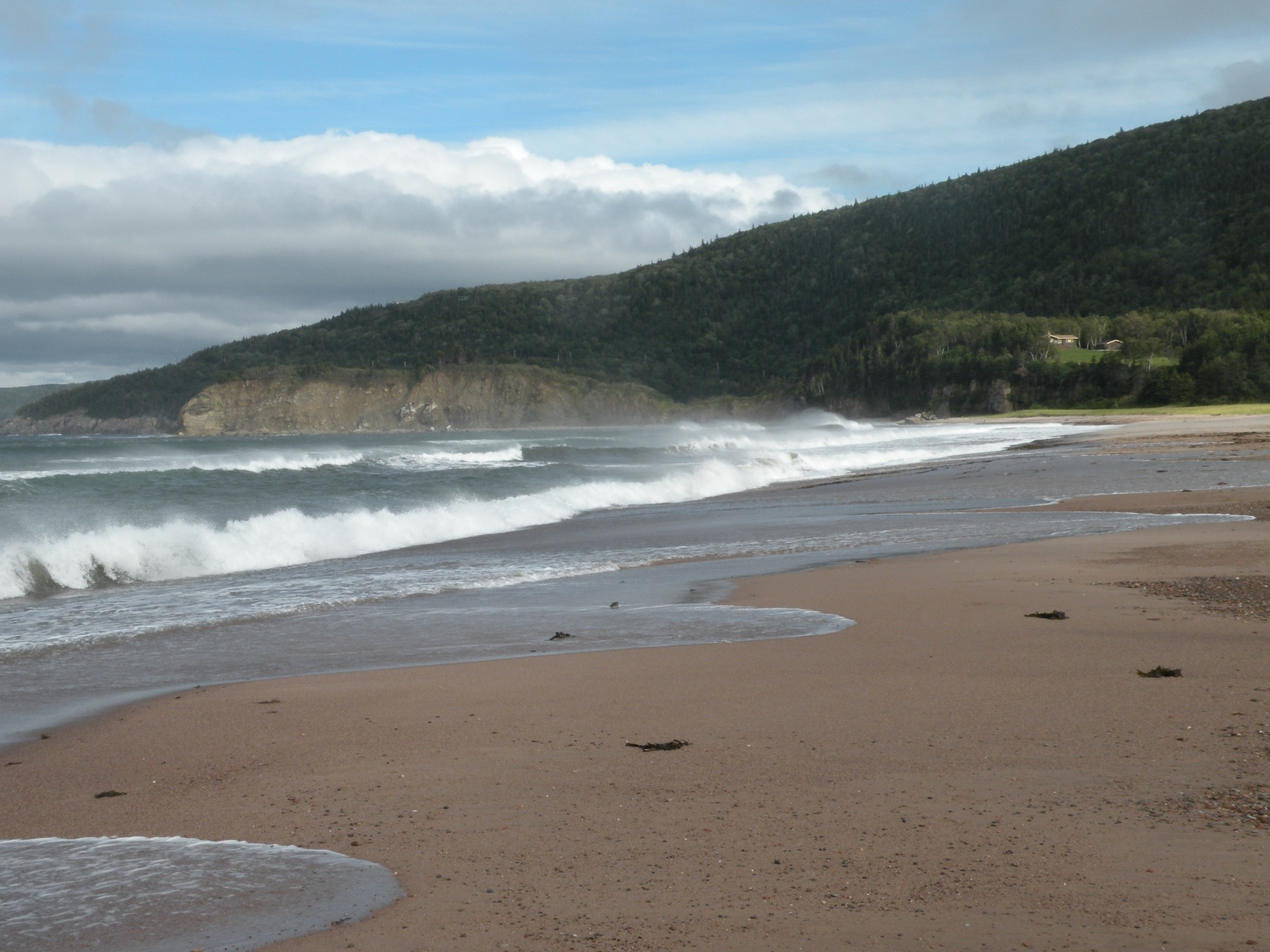
South Harbour beach in the summertime.

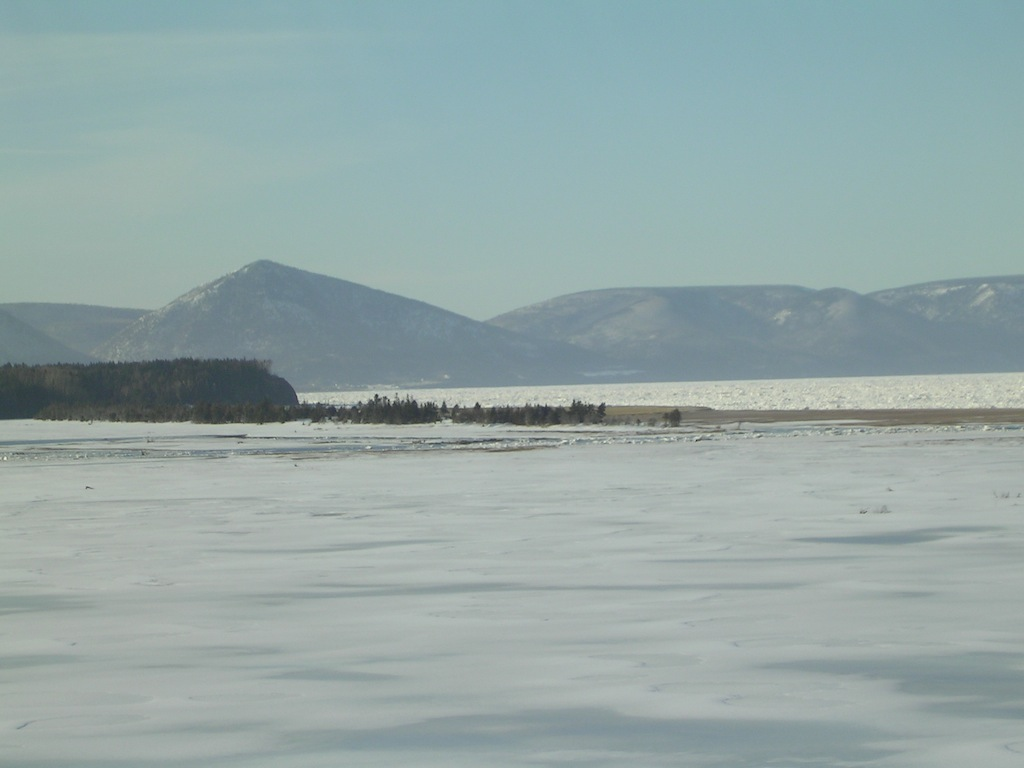
South Harbour in the winter. The estuary typically freezes over every winter.

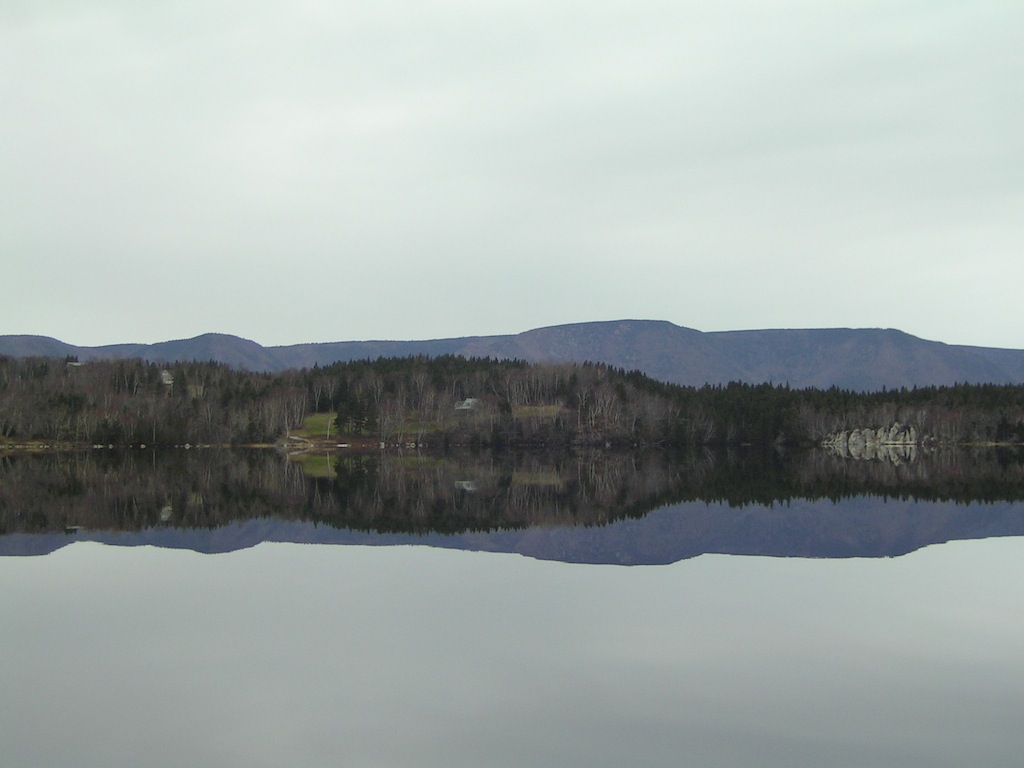
South Harbour on a calm day.
