= Louis de la Corne, Chevalier de la Corne =

Canadian-born military officer and merchant

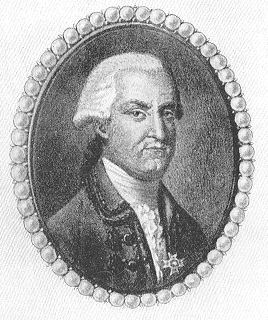
An illustration of the Chevalier de la Corne

Louis de la Corne, Chevalier de la Corne (June 6, 1703 – November 15, 1761) was a Canadian-born military officer and merchant. He was born at Fort Frontenac in what is now Kingston, Ontario, Canada, and began his career in the colonial regular troops as a second ensign in 1722 and was made full ensign five years later. He married in 1728 and began investing heavily in the commerce of the fur trade while continuing his military career. This was a common practice of the time. In the next few years both careers flourished. He received promotions to lieutenant and then captain six years later.

During King George's War, he had serious combat experience in Acadia for which he was awarded the cross of Saint Louis in May 1749 for his actions at the Battle of Grand Pre. During Father Le Loutre's War he was involved in other hostile military operations as well as organizing militias amongst new settlers in new territories (see Battle at Chignecto). In 1752, La Corne began a three-year appointment as the western commander of the poste de l’Ouest, (the French name for the posts started by Pierre Gaultier de Varennes et de La Vérendrye).

He succeeded Jacques Legardeur de Saint-Pierre and set out in June 1753 with 57 men, leaving his brother Luc de la Corne to coordinate additional resources. He crossed paths with Saint-Pierre north of Lake Superior and was briefed on what he would find in the west. During his tenure in the west, La Corne appears to have been an active commander. He improved Fort Paskoya (Le Pas, Man.), built Fort Saint-Louis (Fort de la Corne, Saskatchewan) and explored the Carrot River valley. He was succeeded by Louis-Joseph Gaultier de La Vérendrye who was Commander of the West from 1756 to 1758. (Because of the Seven Years' War, La Vérendrye never actually came west but carried out the business through agents.)

By July 1755, La Corne was back east and was heavily involved in military matters for the next five years, patrolling the Montreal to Lake Ontario waterway with a large contingent of men. More military recognition for his role was recommended but never occurred. He was to be deported to France in 1761 and was one of the victims when the ship, Auguste sank off the coast of Cape Breton Island on November 15 of that year.
