= Aspy Fault =

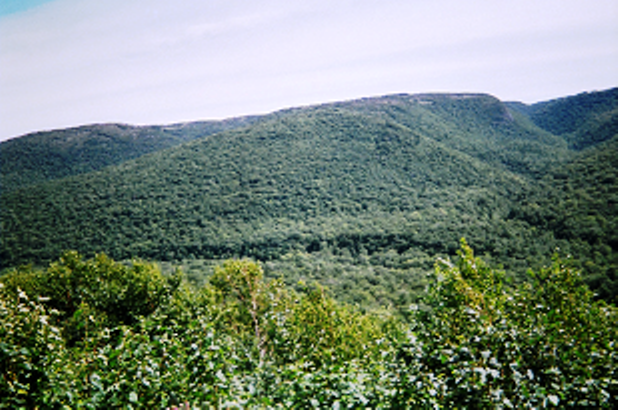
- Aspy Fault as seen from the Cabot Trail lookout.

- Location within Nova Scotia
- Location: Cape Breton
- Coordinates: 46°54′46.2″N 60°31′8.3″W
- Country: Canada
- State: Nova Scotia

Characteristics
- Length: 40 km (25 mi)

Tectonics
- Type: strike-slip fault

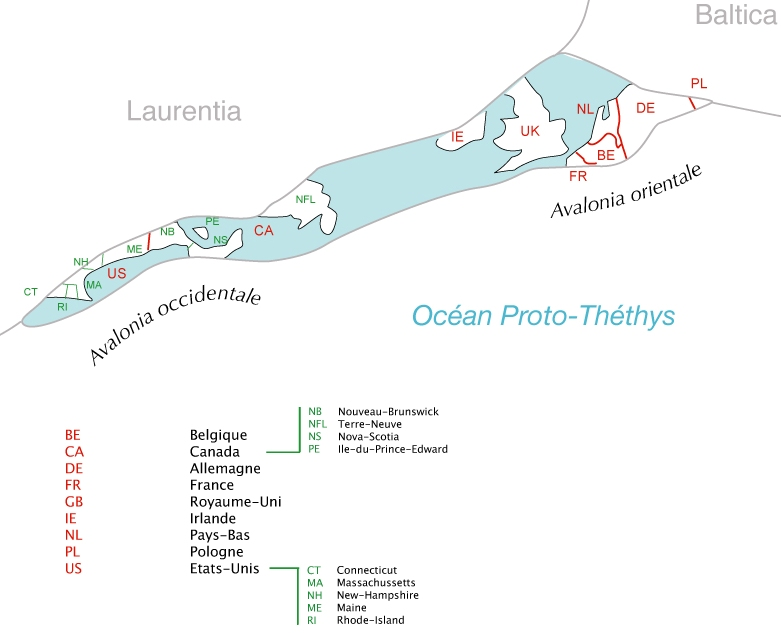
The rocks of the main block of Avalonia as they relate to modern coasts and boundaries but in their relative positions as they were at the end of the Carboniferous, before Europe and North America separated again. The names are given in their French forms.

The Aspy Fault (/ˈæspi/) is a strike-slip fault that runs through 40 km of Cape Breton, Nova Scotia and is often thought to be a part of the Cabot Fault/ Great Glen Fault system of Avalonia. Part of the fault runs through Cape Breton Highlands National Park. This fault runs southward from Cape North through the Margaree Valley. The Aspy River and the upper section of the Margaree River follows the trace of the fault. Evidence shows movement in this fault dating back to the Ordovician period when it was probably created when two continental plates collided and pushed the seafloor upwards, also creating the Appalachian Mountains. Erosion and the presence of this fault have created much of the scenery known today as the Cape Breton Highlands.
