= Cwm Pennant Fault =

Geological fault in Great Britain

Coordinates: 52.97°N 4.21°W

The Cwm Pennant Fault is a SSW-NNE trending normal fault system in North Wales. While initially understood as a simple normal fault system throwing down to the east, research has revealed it is part of a wider, more complex structure known as the Cwm Pennant Fracture Zone. This zone represents one of several linear belts of unusual deformation across North Wales, interpreted as reflecting the movement of older Lower Palaeozoic-era rocks above pre-existing basement fractures. The fracture zone has influenced regional geology since at least the Early Cambrian, affecting sedimentation patterns, controlling volcanic activity, and playing a crucial role during the end-Caledonian mountain-building event through a process of transpression – a combination of compression and sideways movement. The structural characteristics of the Cwm Pennant Fracture Zone, including intense folding and distinctive cleavage patterns, have helped geologists develop a new understanding of how deep basement structures controlled the geological evolution of North Wales.

== Geological context ==
The Cwm Pennant Fault is now understood to be part of a wider system referred to as the Cwm Pennant Fracture Zone (CPFZ). This zone is one of several discrete, linear zones of anomalous deformation identified in North Wales that are interpreted to reflect the deformation of Lower Palaeozoic cover rocks above pre-existing basement fractures.

These basement fractures form a framework which divides North Wales into a series of blocks and sub-blocks. The dominant trend of these fractures is NE-SW with N-S splays and NW-SE orthogonal subfractures. Geological evidence suggests these fracture zones have a history of prolonged tectonic activity dating back to the Early Cambrian.

== Influence on sedimentation and volcanism ==
The Cwm Pennant Fracture Zone separates areas with contrasting stratigraphic sequences. To the east of the fracture, a thick sequence of Caradoc (Early Ordovician) sediments unconformably overlies Tremadocian (Lower Ordovician) and Upper Cambrian strata. The absence of Arenig and Llanvirn (Middle Ordovician) strata to the east is due to a sub-Caradoc unconformity that increases in magnitude towards the fracture zone. In contrast, to the west of the fracture, a thick, complete sequence of Upper Arenig and Llanvirn sediments is present in Cwm Pennant.

Marked changes in the facies of the Cambrian strata also occur across this fracture. To the west and northwest, the Ffestiniog Flags formation comprises massive, coarse, quartz pebble microconglomerates interbedded with silty mudstones. To the east are finer-grained sandstones and silts, typical of the Porthmadog district and the Harlech Dome. A similar westward change to coarser clastic sedimentation in the Tremadocian Porthmadog Formation is evident across this fracture.

== Structural characteristics ==
The Cwm Pennant Fracture Zone has several distinctive structural features that contrast with the typical rock deformation patterns seen elsewhere in North Wales. The zone shows exceptionally high strain values (a measure of how much the rocks have been deformed), with rocks compressed or "flattened" by up to 67% – significantly more intense than the regional average of about 50%.

The rock structures in this zone form a complex network of steep reverse faults (where one block of rock has been pushed up relative to another) running approximately north-south, intersected by wrench faults (where blocks slide horizontally past each other) running northwest-southeast. The folds in this zone are unusually tight and compressed, sometimes folded back on themselves (isoclinal folds), and are oriented at angles to the major faults. These folds are arranged in a stepping or offset pattern (en echelon), suggesting the rocks experienced sideways pressure and movement during formation.

Near the fracture zone, the Moel Hebog syncline (a downward-folded structure) shows an unusual relationship between rock layers and the cleavage (the tendency of rocks to break along parallel planes), with the cleavage cutting across the fold at angles of up to 40°. The zone also shows signs of having been deformed multiple times, with one set of rock alignments being folded and distorted by later earth movements. The zone corresponds with areas where the degree of metamorphism (heat and pressure-induced mineral changes) varies rapidly over short distances, suggesting the fracture zone influenced how heat flowed through the rocks during mountain building.

== Tectonic interpretation ==
The structural characteristics of the Cwm Pennant Fracture Zone suggest it was part of a system that experienced both compression and sideways movement (transpression) during the mountain-building events at the end of the Caledonian period, known as the Acadian phase. Geologists explain this deformation using a model where rocks were primarily pushed toward the southeast, with some additional sideways sliding movements concentrated along specific zones like the Cwm Pennant Fault.

Throughout most of North Wales, the Acadian deformation caused rocks to be squashed horizontally while being stretched vertically, with very little sideways movement in the rocks above the ancient basement. However, along the boundary fracture zones, including the Cwm Pennant Fracture Zone, the forces were concentrated differently. These zones experienced a combination of regional compression, significant vertical stretching, and localized sideways sliding movements.

The southeast-directed pushing forces created steep reverse faults in the deeper, older basement rocks. These faults transition upward into tightly folded rocks with sheared edges in the immediately overlying younger rocks. In the shallowest layers, the folding is less extreme and more open in character.

This interpretation represents a shift from previous geological models for the region. Earlier theories emphasized "thin-skinned tectonics" (where deformation only affects shallow rock layers that slide over deeper, undeformed rocks). The newer understanding suggests that vertical movements above ancient basement fractures played a much more important role in shaping the geological structure of North Wales.

A distinctive feature of the Cwm Pennant Fracture Zone is the clockwise transection of folds by cleavage (where the rock's tendency to split along parallel planes cuts across the fold at an angle). This pattern is similar to structures observed in Central Wales, where it is interpreted as evidence of sinistral (left-lateral) transpression. These transected fold structures typically develop when pre-existing basement faults are reactivated under oblique compression. The transection angles are often highest in zones with steep bedding, suggesting that sideways movement components were preferentially concentrated in these areas.

== Regional context ==
The Cwm Pennant Fault represents one example of a larger pattern of basement fracture zones that influenced deformation across Wales during the Acadian mountain-building event. Similar structures have been documented in Central Wales along the Central Wales Lineament, where transpressive reactivation of basement faults also produced complex fold-fault patterns in the overlying rocks.

This pattern fits within a broader model of Acadian deformation affecting the Welsh Basin, where the entire region was shortened in a roughly NNW-SSE direction. The resulting deformation varied depending on the orientation of pre-existing basement structures. In North Wales, where the Cwm Pennant Fault is located, NE-SW trending structures like the Cwm Pennant Fracture Zone experienced sinistral transpression, while E-W structures elsewhere in North Wales underwent dextral (right-lateral) transpression.

The Cwm Pennant Fracture Zone is particularly significant because it provides insights into how deformation in the shallow rock layers was influenced by deeper basement structures. Similar relationships have been documented in other parts of Wales where basement rocks are closer to the surface, helping geologists understand the structural development of areas where the basement is more deeply buried.

== See also ==
- List of geological faults of Wales
