= Bronnant Fault =

Geological fault in Great Britain

The Bronnant Fault is a geological fault affecting the lower Palaeozoic rocks of the counties of Ceredigion and Pembrokeshire in West Wales. The feature is mapped over part of its length as the Bronnant Fault Zone and is closely associated with the Glandyfi Lineament, a similarly aligned zone of faulting and folding. The rocks of the Aberystwyth Grits Group dating from the Llandovery epoch of the Silurian period thicken markedly to the west of the fault suggesting it was active at the time of their deposition. North of Lledrod its alignment is affected by cross-cutting east–west faults, including the Ystwyth Fault Zone. Its alignment is sub-parallel to the coast of Cardigan Bay thus curving from a north–south alignment in the north through a northeast–southwest alignment until it merges with broadly east–west aligned faults in northeast Pembrokeshire.

== Tectonic evolution ==
The Bronnant Fault system is a major structure in central Ceredigion that separates the Mynydd Bach high ground from the lower ground to the east. Geological mapping and white-mica studies show that it accommodated several kilometres of displacement during the Palaeozoic, and its movement history charts the switch from an early phase of crustal stretching to later compression and, finally, to renewed extension. During the Ordovician and early Silurian the fault behaved as a growth fault: the western (hanging-wall) fault block sank more rapidly, creating a half-graben in which thicker packages of the Mynydd Bach and overlying turbidite formations accumulated. Because the layers on each side of the fault were being tilted while they were still unconsolidated, the fault's throw varied with depth, reaching about 2.5 km at the level now exposed in cross-section.

Low-grade metamorphic minerals formed while the basin was being squeezed in the early Devonian, and the Bronnant system was already active by then. Cross-sections through the fault zone show that its down-throw on strata is opposite to that on the metamorphic "isocryst" surfaces used by geologists to map temperature; this mismatch indicates that the fault had achieved most of its throw before the metamorphic event and was then reactivated in reverse (compressional) mode during basin inversion. The same compression produced a back-thrust a little farther west (the Mynydd Bach Fault) and generated short cuts in the footwall block—features typical of a contracting crust.

When folding and very-low-grade metamorphism tailed off, the regional stress regime relaxed and the Bronnant Fault slipped once more in a normal sense, dropping its western side down a few hundred metres. This late movement means the structure records the complete tectonic cycle of the Welsh Basin: early stretching, contraction and inversion, then final relaxation. Together with associated folds such as the Teifi Anticline and the Central Wales Syncline, the Bronnant Fault offers a clear window into how Palaeozoic basins in Wales changed shape through time while their rocks were only gently heated—never enough to melt but enough to let clay minerals recrystallise and leave a temperature record now read from X-ray measurements of white mica.

== See also ==
- List of geological faults of Wales
