= Benton Fault =

Geological fault in Great Britain

Coordinates: 51.75°N 4.99°W

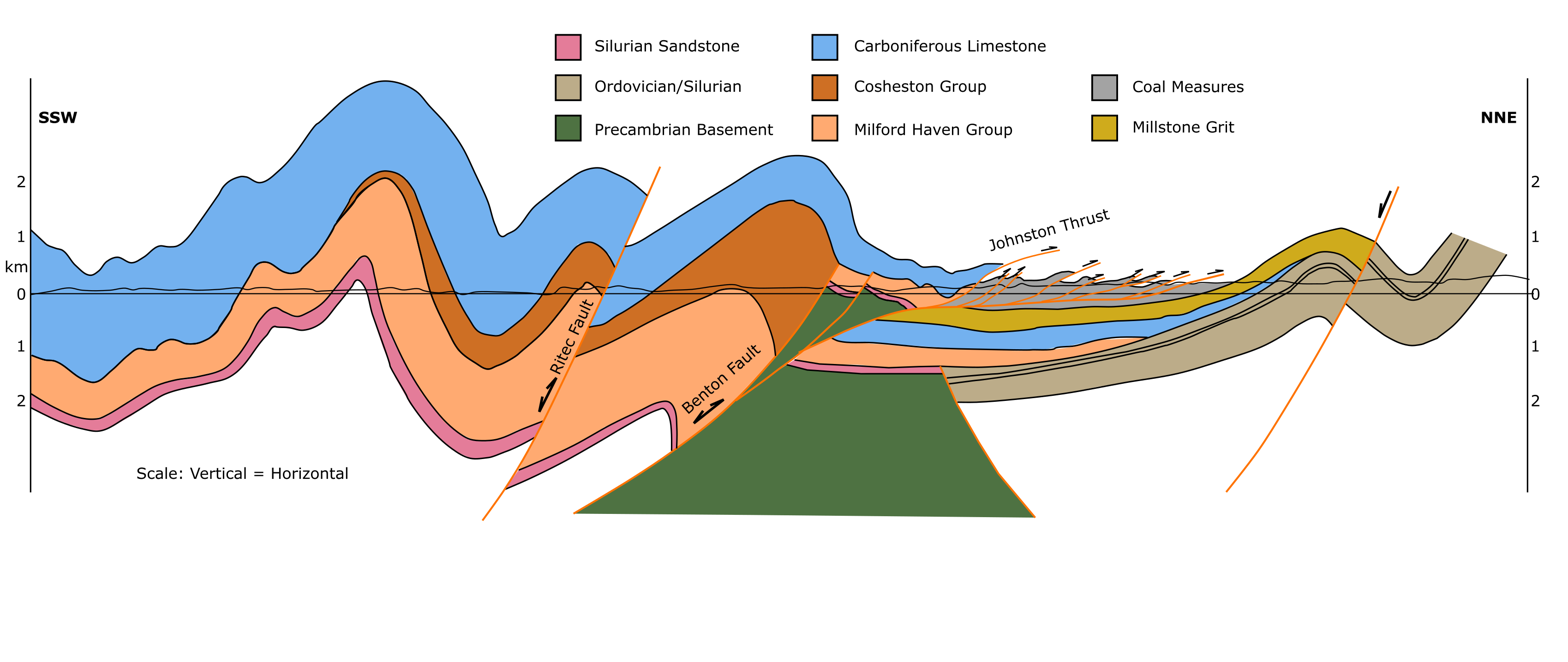
Cross-section over the Ritec and Benton faults and the Johnston Thrust

The Benton Fault is a geological fault in southern Pembrokeshire in southwest Wales that was active as a normal fault during the deposition of the Old Red Sandstone during the Devonian period, forming a thick half graben. During the Carboniferous, the Benton Fault was strongly inverted as part of the Variscan orogeny.

== Tectonic setting ==
The Benton Fault, and the related Ritec Fault, are the main structures bounding the Anglo-Welsh Basin in Pembrokeshire, during the deposition of the Old Red Sandstone. To the north the footwall of the Benton Fault is a regional tectonic high, active since at least the Ordovician. During the late Silurian to early Devonian period, Pembrokeshire was part of the southern margin of Avalonia, which was at that time involved in the Caledonian orogeny at its northwestern margin. Southern Avalonia was affected locally by extensional tectonics, although the cause of this remains poorly understood.

== Geological history ==
The Benton Fault probably originated during the early Palaeozoic era (over 400 million years ago) as one of the faults bounding a raised block of Precambrian igneous rocks, a horst. During the Caledonian orogeny (mountain-building event) in the Llandovery early Silurian period, the Benton Fault became an active normal fault during the deposition of Old Red Sandstone sediments. As a normal fault, the land on its southern side dropped down relative to the northern side. The earliest signs of activity on the Benton Fault, are facies changes in the Telychian (uppermost Llandovery) to Wenlockian Coralliferous Group, with the pro-delta facies being confined to the hanging wall of the fault. Estimate of thickening, taking into account the effects of compaction compared to the footwall, show thickening of the upper part of the overlying Gray Sandstone Group across the fault. The percentage of thickening continues to rise to over 150% in the lower part of the Milford Haven Group, increasing further to over 300% in the middle and upper parts of that group. During deposition of the overlying Coheston Group, the percentage thickening remained at about 300%.

The Middle Devonian is missing in south Wales, as it is as far north in Britain as the Highland Boundary Fault. This regional hiatus in sedimentation is generally explained as a result of the Acadian phase of the Caledonian orogeny, by analogy with the similar-aged deformation event known from the Appalachians. The south Wales sequences were not, however, affected by anything more than uplift.

During the Dinantian (the lowermost part of the Carboniferous period), the Benton Fault became inactive, as shown by undisturbed Carboniferous Limestone rocks that overlie it at the eastern end of its outcrop. During the Variscan orogeny in the late Carboniferous (about 300 million years ago), the Benton Fault was inverted, with reverse movement, meaning that the southern side was pushed up relative to the northern side. This reactivation was particularly significant in the western portion of the fault. During the inversion, only the deeper part of the Benton Fault was reactivated, the shallower part of the fault was deformed passively by the Johnston Thrust, interpreted as a "footwall shortcut" that links back into the deeper, reactivated part of the Benton Fault.

== See also ==
- List of geological faults of Wales
