= Carmel Head Thrust =

Geological fault in Anglesey, Wales

Coordinates: 53°22′N 4°25′W

The Carmel Head Thrust is a geological fault on Carmel Head in north Anglesey, Wales, where rocks of the Precambrian Mona Complex are thrust over Lower Paleozoic sedimentary rocks.

== Geology and structure ==
The Carmel Head Thrust is a low angle, east-north-east–trending thrust fault exposed along the rocky coastline of north-west Anglesey, Wales, from Carmel Head to the mouth of Cemaes Bay. It forms the basal thrust of the Amlwch Terrane: Cambrian mud-rich rocks of the Llanfechel Group and associated volcanic slices were pushed south- to south-eastwards over younger, relatively undeformed Floian-to-Darriwilian mudstones of the Llyn Alaw Group. More recent work by the British Geological Survey shows that the thrust marks a fundamental terrane boundary, with contrasting lithologies, metamorphic grades and structural histories on either side of the fault trace.

== Tectonic history ==
Geological evidence indicates that the main movement took place after emplacement of the Parys Mountain volcanic sequence (about 436 Ma) but before deposition of the undeformed Old Red Sandstone, placing displacement in the late Silurian. During that episode the northern slice travelled south-east on a low-angle fault plane, stacking older Neoproterozoic–Cambrian rocks on top of Early-to-Middle Ordovician strata. Later, during the Early Devonian Acadian compressional phase, the thrust was re-activated; renewed south-directed movement is inferred from cleavage in the Old Red Sandstone succession, but the amount of displacement is not quantified.

Today the Carmel Head Thrust is well exposed in sea-cliffs and foreshore platforms, where thinly layered, finely cleaved turbidite mudstones of the Cemlyn Bay Formation in the hanging wall overlie green, oxic-facies mudstones of the Llyn Alaw Group in the footwall. The fault demonstrates, in a single line of cliffs, the process of thrusting: older, deeper rocks have ridden up and over younger layers along a gently inclined rupture—and subsequent erosion has sliced through this stack to give a window into the tectonic assembly of Anglesey during the closing stages of the Caledonian orogeny.

== See also ==
- List of geological faults of Wales
