= Milford Haven Group =

Geological formation in Great Britain

- Stratigraphic range: Ludlovian to Pragian (Silurian - Devonian)
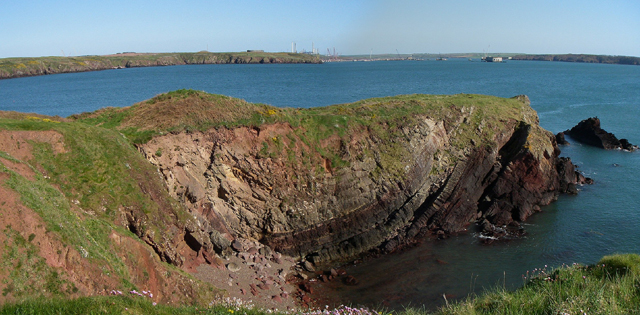
- Folded marls of the Milford Haven Group exposed at Little Castle Head, west of Milford Haven
- Type: Group
- Unit of: Old Red Sandstone Supergroup
- Sub-units: Red Cliff, Albion Sands, Lindsway Bay, Sandy Haven, Gelliswick Bay, Freshwater East, Moor Cliffs and Freshwater West formations
- Underlies: Cosheston Group and Ridgeway Conglomerate
- Overlies: Benton Rhyolitic Group and Gray Sandstone Group
- Thickness: ~1500m

Lithology
- Primary: marls
- Other: sandstone, conglomerates, breccia

Location
- Country: Wales
- Extent: south Pembrokeshire

Type section
- Named for: Milford Haven

The Milford Haven Group is a late Silurian to early Devonian lithostratigraphic group (a sequence of rock strata) in west Wales. The name is derived from the estuary and town of Milford Haven in south Pembrokeshire. The Group comprises calcareous marls with occasional sandstones along with conglomerates and breccias.

The Group unconformably overlies rocks of the Gray Sandstone Group and comprises two different successions either side of the east–west aligned Ritec Fault To the north are (in ascending order) the Red Cliff, Albion Sands/Lindsway Bay, Sandy Haven and Gelliswick Bay formations. To the south are the Freshwater East, Moor Cliffs and Freshwater West formations. The Chapel Point Calcretes Member is recognised at the top of the Moor Cliffs Formation whilst the succeeding Freshwater West Formation is divided into a lower Conigar Pit Sandstone Member and an upper Rat Island Mudstone Member.

The earlier of these formations are assigned to the Pridoli series of the Silurian. The top of the Silurian section is (according to some schemes) marked by the Townsend Tuff Member, above which lies the Lochkovian age strata. The Gelliswick Bay and Freshwater West formations are assigned to the local Dittonian series and straddle the internationally recognised Lochkovian and Pragian series. This suite of rocks is in turn conformably overlain by rocks of the Cosheston Group.
