= Bryn Eglwys (disambiguation) =

Bryn Eglwys or Bryneglwys (Welsh for Church on the Hill) may refer to:

- Bryn Eglwys quarry, a slate quarry in Gwynedd, Wales
- Bryneglwys, a village in Denbighshire, Wales
- Bryneglwys Fault, a geological fault in Wales
- Bryn Eglwys (locomotive), a former locomotive on the Talyllyn Railway
