= Easter microplate =

Very small tectonic plate to the west of Easter Island

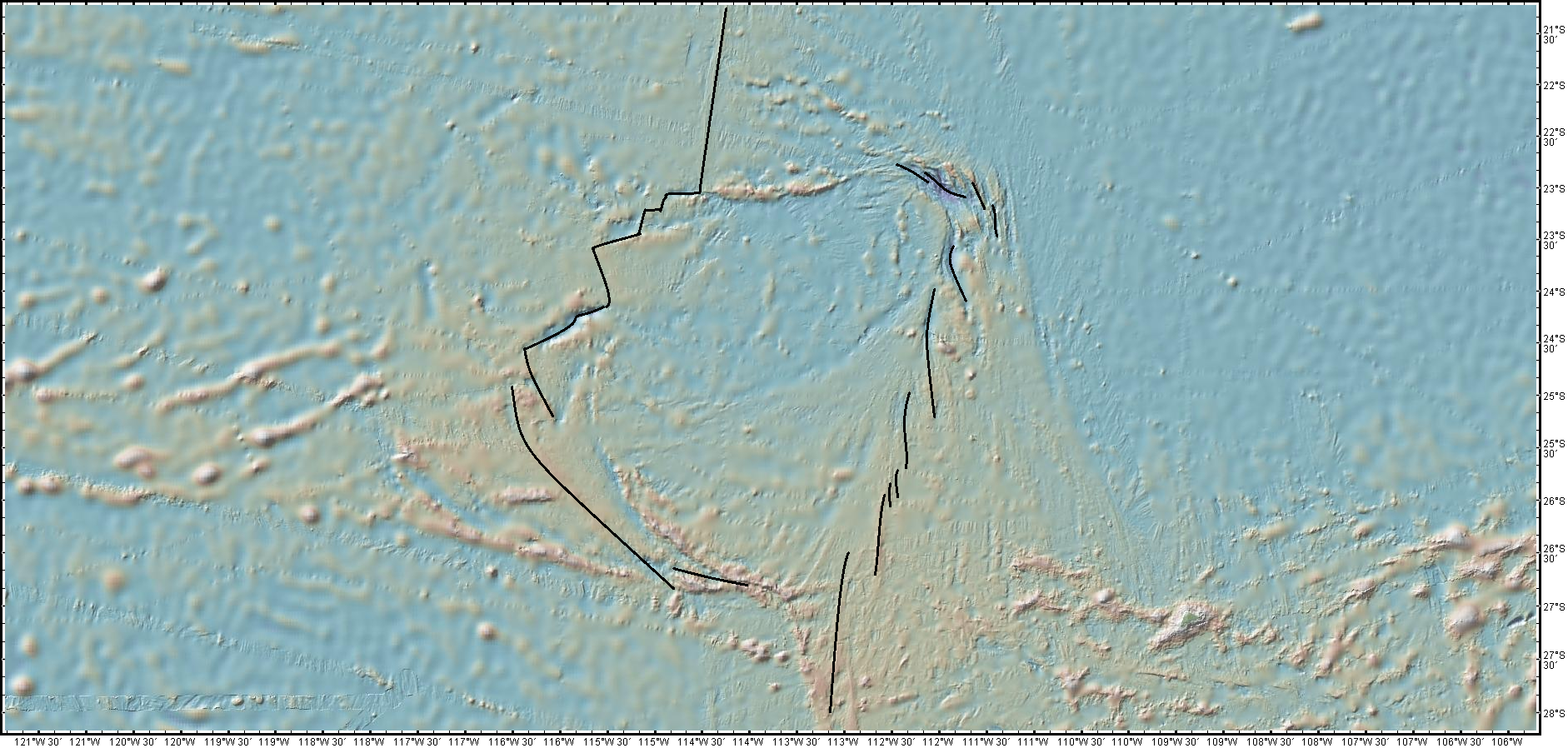
- Easter microplate (from GeoMapApp) with rough plate boundaries. Four spreading sections make up the eastern border. The west section comes from the north side down in a southwest manner, until it breaks off and becomes the southwest section. Triple junctions on north and south ends are not well defined.
- Type: Micro
- Coordinates: 25°00′S 114°00′W
- Approximate area: 160,000 km2
- Movement^{1}: East
- Speed^{1}: 50 to 140 millimetres (2.0 to 5.5 in)/yr
- Features: Bordering: Pacific plate (west); Nazca plate (east)
- ^{1}Relative to the African plate

The Easter plate is a tectonic microplate located to the west of Easter Island off the west coast of South America in the middle of the Pacific Ocean, bordering the Nazca plate to the east and the Pacific plate to the west. It was discovered from looking at earthquake distributions that were offset from the previously perceived Nazca-Pacific Divergent boundary. This young plate is 5.25 million years old and is considered a microplate because it is small with an area of approximately 160,000 square kilometres (62,000 sq mi). Seafloor spreading along the Easter microplate's borders have some of the highest global rates, ranging from 50 to 140 millimetres (2.0 to 5.5 in)/yr.

== Structure and tectonics (present) ==
From the 1970s to 1990s, multiple efforts were made to collect data on the area, including several magnetic and gravitational anomaly surveys. These surveys show that Easter plate is uniquely shallow, bordered by spreading centers and transform boundaries, with triple junctions located at the southern and northern tip.

Along the eastern border, there are several spreading centers south of 27° S and 3 northward propagating rift to the north of 27° S. The axis further north is a graben reaching a depth of approximately 6000 m. Northward propagation of the eastern rifts is continuous at a speed of 150 millimetres (5.9 in)/yr. The spreading ridge between 26° S and 27° S has a spreading rate of 120 millimetres (4.7 in)/yr, but is asymmetrical on Nazca plate side. Bathymetry data shows the depth is 2,100 metres (6,900 ft) near 26°30' S and progressively gets deeper to the north, reaching depths of 3,300 metres (10,800 ft) in an axial valley. There is approximately a 25 kilometres (16 mi) gap at the northern end of the east rift with no rift connecting the northern boundary to the eastern boundary.

The northern border has wide ridges, greater than 1 km tall, linked side-by-side with the steeper slopes to the south. The southern trough area sits deeper than the areas to the north. The very eastern end of the northern border has pure strike-slip motion, while the western end is marked by the Northern Pacific-Nazca-Easter triple junction. This triple junction is a stable rift-fracture-fracture zone with anomalous earthquakes occurring to the northeast portion, indicating a possible second spreading axis. The rest of the northern boundary to the east and west of the triple junction are colinear transform boundaries. A trough, approximately 3,700 metres (12,100 ft) deep, borders the north along this transform boundary to the east connecting to a 5,300 metres (17,400 ft) deep hole, called the "Pito Deep" because of its close proximity to the Pito Seamount, at the northeastern limit.

The western border is divided into two parts. The west section has 2 spreading segments running north to south with spreading rates that approximately range from 120 to 140 millimetres (4.7 to 5.5 in)/yr. These segments are connected by sinistrally slipping transform faults around 14°15' S. A relay basin runs north to south along the southernmost segment as a result of past counter-clockwise rotation. The southwest consists of one slower spreading center (50 to 90 millimetres (2.0 to 3.5 in)/yr) that runs northwest to southeast until joining the southern transform boundary.

Like the western end of the northerner border, the southern end also has an inferred rift-rift-fracture triple junction, but no data has been gathered yet to verify its existence. A single transform fault runs west to east and is home to the most rugged and shallow terrain with high seismic activity.

== Evolution ==
In 1995, routine magnetic, gravity, and echosounder data, supplemented with data from GLORIA (a long-range side scan sonar), German Sea Beam, SeaMARC II, and data from the World Data Center in Boulder, CO were all utilized to construct a two-stage model for the evolution of the Easter microplate.

=== Stage 1: 5.25 to 2.25 million years ago ===
Approximately 5.25 million years ago, the boundary between the Pacific and Nazca plates was not connected and did not completely separate the two plates. The Easter microplate began to grow to the north–south throughout this period. The eastern rift, having not yet connected to the western rift, began to propagate northward by pseudofaults that appear to the west and east of the rift and continued until approximately 2.25 million years ago when the tip reached 23° S. While this was occurring, the west rift was propagating southward, north of the east rift, breaking into segments connected by transform faults that trend towards the southwest. The entire microplate continued a counter-clockwise rotation rate of 15° every million years throughout the entire history of the Easter microplate.

=== Stage 2: 2.25 million years ago to present ===
The Easter microplate grew at a slower rate in the east–west dimension during this period, as it stopped growing north–south due to the cessation of east rift propagation. The east rift did continue angular spreading while keeping the same growth rate, but did not propagate any further northward. The west rift continued adjusting with more segmenting until the southwest rift began to open and propagate to the east. The southwest rift continued propagation until the present day southern triple junction was created.

=== Future predictions ===
Though other evolution models have argued that the microplate was created approximately 4.5 million years ago, there is currently only one hypothesis for future evolution of the Easter microplate. It is believed that due to the slowing spreading rates at the southwest rift and the northern end of the east rift, the southwest and west rift will cease spreading activity and completely transfer the microplate from the Nazca to the Pacific plate. This has been the case for other areas where extensive rift propagation studies have been conducted.

== Dynamics ==
=== Driving forces ===
Divergence of the Nazca and Pacific plates generate a pulling force acting on the Easter microplate, causing its rotation. Two types of driving forces are believed to act on the Nazca-Pacific plate divergence: shear and tension. Shear driving forces occur along the north and south boundaries, which explain failures due to compression in the northern end of the plate. Tension driving forces occur at the east and west rifts. Because of the fast spreading rates along these boundaries, the Easter microplate has a thin lithosphere. The normal tensional forces applied across the east and west rifts is enough to drive the microplate's rotation. Due to the slowing trend of these spread rates along these rifts to the north, it is believed the lithosphere gets thicker near the north and the shear forces are believed to contribute to the overall driving force.

=== Resisting forces ===
Mantle basal drag accounts for 20% of the forces applied to the Easter microplate. Mantle basal drag force is calculated using the equation: $\vec{F}_D = D\vec{V}$, where $\vec{F}_D$ is the mantle drag force per unit area, $D$ is the proportionality constant, and $\vec{V}$ is absolute velocity of microplate using a fixed hotspot as the reference frame. The value for $\vec{F}_D$ represents a quantification of the total resisting force that the ductile asthenosphere applies to the brittle lithosphere floating on top.

The other 80% of the resisting forces come from the rotation of the Easter microplate. As the microplate is rotating, normal resistances are applied to the microplate at the north and south ends where there are no rifts to help microplate adjustment. Both tension and compression contribute to the resistance, but compressional forces along the ends of the rifts have more of an impact. These compressional forces are what create the elevated regions that surround the "Pito Deep".
