= List of geological faults of Wales =

This is a list of the named geological faults affecting the rocks of Wales. See the main article on faults for a fuller treatment of fault types and nomenclature but in brief, the main types are normal faults, reverse faults, thrusts or thrust faults and strike-slip faults. Many faults may have acted as both normal faults at one time and as reverse or thrust faults at another and may or may not have also incorporated some degree of strike-slip movement too. Fault zones, fault belts and fault complexes typically describe assemblages of faults which have a common origin and history and whose alignments tend to be sub-parallel to one another.

There are also a number of 'disturbances', notably in South Wales. These linear features are a combination of faults and folds - the relative importance of faulting and folding varying along the length of each disturbance.

== Key to tables ==
- Column 1 indicates the name of the fault. Note that different authors may use different names for the same fault or a section of it. Conversely the same name may be applied to more than one fault, particularly in the case of smaller faults which are widely separated. Names are as they appear in the literature and do not necessarily conform to the commonly accepted modern spelling or form of the place-names with which they are associated.
- Column 2 indicates the OS grid reference of the approximate midpoint of certain faults. Note that the mapped extent of a fault may not accurately reflect its actual extent.
- Column 3 indicates the county in which the fault occurs. Some traverse two or more counties of course.
- Column 4 indicates on which sheet, if any, of the British Geological Survey's 1:50,000 / 1" scale geological map series of England and Wales, the fault is shown and named (either on map/s or cross-section/s or both). Also listed are a handful of BGS maps at other scales, where the fault is both shown and named.
- Column 5 indicates a selection of publications in which references to the fault may be found. See references section for full details of publication.

== Alphabetical lists of faults ==
=== A ===
Fault name	OS map ref	County	BGS map sheet	book references
Aber Dinlle Fault		Gwynedd		Brenchley & Rawson 2006
Aber Fault		Glamorganshire	E&W 248	
Aber Richard Fault			E&W 194; 210	
Aberbeeg Fault				Mem E&W 232
Aberdaron Fault		Gwynedd	E&W 133	
Abergwesyn Fault			E&W 196, 212	
Abertillery Fault			E&W 249	Mem E&W 232
Abertridwr Fault		Glamorganshire	E&W 249	
Acorn Fault			E&W 230	
Afon Banwy Fault		Powys	E&W 150	
Afon Ganol Fault		Clwyd		Mem E&W 95/107
Afon Saint Fault		Gwynedd	E&W 133	
Allt y Crib Fault			E&W 163	
Allt y Grug Fault			E&W 230	
Alyn Valley Fault			E&W 108	
Anafon Fault		Gwynedd	E&W 106	
Arthog - Caerdeon Fault			E&W 149	
Axton Fault		Flintshire	E&W 96	

=== B ===
Fault name	OS map ref	County	BGS map sheet	book references
Bala - Llanelidan Fault				Smith et al. 2005
Bala Fault			E&W 135; 136	
Bala Fault Zone			UK (south) 625K	
Beddgelert Fault		Gwynedd	E&W 119	
Beech Hill Fault		Monmouthshire	Usk-Cwm:25K	
Belmont Fault		Clwyd		Mem E&W 95/107
Benton Fault		Pembrokeshire	E&W 228	Brenchley & Rawson 2006
Berach Fault			E&W 230	
Berw Fault		Anglesey		Brenchley & Rawson 2006
Berw Fault Complex		Anglesey		Brenchley & Rawson 2006
Bethel Fault		Glamorganshire	E&W 247	
Bettws Fault			E&W 230	
Bettws Newydd Fault				Mem E&W 232
Blaenavon Fault		Monmouthshire	E&W 232	
Blaenhirwaun Thrust			E&W 230	
Blaen Onneu Fault			E&W 232	
Bodafon Thrust		Anglesey		Brenchley & Rawson 2006
Bodelwyddan Fault		Denbighshire	E&W 95; 107	Mem E&W 95/107
Box Fault		Glamorganshire	E&W 247	
Bristol Channel Fault Zone		Bristol Channel		
Bronnant Fault		Ceredigion	E&W 178; 210; 211	
Bronnant Fault Zone		Ceredigion	E&W 194; 195	
Brothers Fault		Glamorganshire	E&W 247	
Brwynd Overthrust			E&W 163	
Bryn Eglwys Fault			E&W 120	Brenchley & Rawson 2006
Bryn Morgan Thrust			E&W 230	
Bryn Posteg Fault			E&W 164	
Bryn Rhys Fault		Clwyd		Mem E&W 95/107
Brynderi Fault		Monmouthshire		Mem E&W 233/250
Bryneglwys Fault			E&W 121	
Bryngwili Fault			E&W 230	
Bryngwyn Fault		Glamorganshire	E&W 230; 247	
Bryn-y-maen Fault		Denbighshire	E&W 95	
Bwlchgwyn Fault			E&W 108	
Bylchau Fault		Denbighshire	E&W 107	Mem E&W 95/107

=== C ===
Fault name	OS map ref	County	BGS map sheet	book references
Cae Parc Fault		Glamorganshire	E&W 247	
Caerdeon Bodlyn Fault		Merionethshire	E&W 135	
Caergwrle Fault			E&W 108	
Caerleon Fault		Monmouthshire	E&W 249; Usk-Cwm:25K	
Caerphilly Fault		Glamorganshire	E&W 249	
Camdwr Fault			E&W 163	
Capel Garmon Fault		Clwyd	E&W 107	Mem E&W 95/107
Cardigan - Fishguard Fault Belt		Pembrokeshire	E&W 210	
Carmel Fault (Powys)		Powys	E&W 179	
Carmel Fault (Carmarthenshire)		Carmarthenshire	E&W 230	
Carmel Head Thrust			UK (south) 625K	Brenchley & Rawson 2006
Carreg Maen Taro Fault			E&W 232	
Carrog Valley Fault		Ceredigion	E&W 178	
Cascade Overthrust			E&W 163	
Castell Fault			E&W 163	Mem E&W 165/151
Cefn Fault		Clwyd		Mem E&W 95/107
Cefncynfal Fault		Powys		Mem E&W 165/1051
Cefn Bryn Thrust		Glamorganshire	E&W 246	
Cefn Crib Fault		Glamorganshire	E&W 249	
Cefn Fault			E&W 107	
Cefn Garw Fault		Monmouthshire		Mem E&W 233/250
Cefn Ila Fault		Monmouthshire	Usk-Cwm:25K	E&W 232
Cefnamwlch-Rhiw Fault		Gwynedd	E&W 134	
Ceibwr Bay Fault			E&W 193	
Ceidio Fault		Anglesey		Brenchley & Rawson 2006
Ceunant Fault			E&W 149	
Chapel Fault			E&W 231	
Chepstow Fault		Monmouthshire		Mem E&W 233/250
Church Stretton Fault System				Brenchley & Rawson 2006
Church Stretton Fault Zone			E&W 213	Mem E&W 165/151
Cilfeigan Fault		Monmouthshire	E&W 249; Usk-Cwm:25K	
Claerwen Fault			E&W 179	
Clochaenog Fault		Clwyd		Mem E&W 95/107
Clwyd Fault				Smith et al. 2005
Clydach Bridge Fault		Monmouthshire	E&W 232	
Clywedog Fault			E&W 164	
Clytha Fault			E&W 232	
Coalbrook Fault			E&W 230	
Coed Hir Fault			E&W 231	
Coed Ithel Fault		Monmouthshire		Mem E&W 233/250
Coedycerrig Fault			E&W 232	
Coed-y-paen Fault		Monmouthshire	E&W 249; Usk-Cwm:25K	
Conwy Valley Fault/Conway Valley Fault		Gwynedd	E&W 106	Mem E&W 95/107
Copper Works Fault		Glamorganshire	E&W 247	
Cors-bol Fault		Anglesey		Brenchley & Rawson 2006
Craig Twrch Fault			E&W 212	
Craiglaseithin Fault		Gwynedd	E&W 135/149	
Craignant - Milton Fault				Smith et al. 2005
Craignant Fault				Smith et al. 2005
Craig-y-beri Fault			E&W 137	
Craig-y-glyn Fault			E&W 137	
Creigydd Fault		Monmouthshire	E&W 249; Usk-Cwm:25K	
Cribarth Fault			E&W 213	
Crick Fault		Monmouthshire		Mem E&W 233/250
Cross Ash Fault		Monmouthshire		Mem E&W 233/250
Crychan Fault		Powys	E&W 196, 213	
Crychan Fault Belt			E&W 213	
Cwm Cayo Brook Fault		Monmouthshire		Mem E&W 233/250
Cwm Cynnen Fault			E&W 211	
Cwm Dockin Fault			E&W 165	
Cwm Dwfnant Fault			E&W 196	
Cwm Earl Fault			E&W 165	
Cwm Felin Fault		Glamorganshire	E&W 247	
Cwm Llwyd Fault			E&W 230	
Cwm Pennant Fault				Brenchley & Rawson 2006
Cwm Pit Fault		Glamorganshire	E&W 247	
Cwm Sylwi Fault			E&W 149; 163	
Cwmcarvan Fault		Monmouthshire		Mem E&W 233/250
Cwmdockin Fault		Powys		Mem E&W 151/165
Cwm-dows Fault		Glamorganshire	E&W 249	
Cwmgwineu Fault		Glamorganshire	E&W 247	
Cwmllynfell Fault			E&W 230	
Cwm-Mawr Fault			E&W 196	
Cwmmawr Thrust			E&W 230	
Cwmneol Faul			E&W 231	
Cymmer Fault		Glamorganshire	E&W 248	
Cynheidre Thrust			E&W 230	
Cynllaith Fault			E&W 137	

=== D ===
Fault name	OS map ref	County	BGS map sheet	book references
Daren Ddu Fault		Glamorganshire	E&W 249	
Daron Fault		Gwynedd	E&W 133	
Denbigh Fault		Clwyd	E&W 107	Mem E&W 95/107
Dinas Fault (Powys)		Powys	E&W 231	
Dinas Fault (Glams)		Glamorganshire	E&W 248	
Dinorwic Fault		Gwynedd	E&W 106	
Dip Fach Fault			E&W 231	
Dolforwyn Fault			E&W 165	Mem E&W 151/165
Dolwar Fault		Powys	E&W 150	
Dowlais Fault (Mons)		Monmouthshire	E&W 231; 232	
Dowlais Fault (Glams)		Glamorganshire	E&W 249	
Duffryn Fault		Glamorganshire	E&W 230, 247	
Dulas Fault			E&W 196	
Dulas Gap Fault		Denbighshire	E&W 95; 107	Mem E&W 95/107
Dyffryn Maelor Fault		Clwyd		Mem E&W 95/107
Dyfi Valley Fault		Powys	E&W 150	
Dyfnant Fault		Powys	E&W 150	
Dyfngwm Fault			E&W 164	
Dylife Esgairgaled Fault			E&W 164	
Dylife Fault			E&W 164	
Dynant Fault			E&W 230	
Dysynni Fault			E&W 149	
Dyto Fault		Clwyd		Mem E&W 95/107

=== E ===
Fault name	OS map ref	County	BGS map sheet	book references
East Llangerniew Fault		Clwyd	E&W 107	Mem E&W 95/107
Efailnewydd Fault		Gwynedd	E&W 134	
Eglwysbach Fault		Clwyd		Mem E&W 95/107
Energlyn Fault		Glamorganshire	E&W 249	
Erroxhill Fault		Pembrokeshire	E&W 228	

=== F ===
Fault name	OS map ref	County	BGS map sheet	book references
Felin Arw Fault		Glamorganshire	E&W 248	
Ferry Fault		Glamorganshire	E&W 247	
Flint Fault			E&W 108	
Forge Overthrust			E&W 149; 163	

=== G ===
Fault name	OS map ref	County	BGS map sheet	book references
Gadlys Fault		Glamorganshire	E&W 231; 248	
Gardeners Fault		Glamorganshire	E&W 230; 247	
Garth - Llanwrtyd Fault Belt			E&W 212	
Garth Fault			E&W 196, 213	
Garth Ferry Fault		Anglesey		Brenchley & Rawson 2006
Garth Hill Overthrust		Glamorganshire	E&W 249	
Gelli Fault		Glamorganshire	E&W 249	
Gelligaer Fault		Glamorganshire	E&W 249	
Gelli-goch Overthrust			E&W 149; 163	
Giant's Grave Fault		Glamorganshire	E&W 247	
Glan Hafren Fault			E&W 165	Mem E&W 151/165
Glanalders Fault			E&W 179	
Glandyfi Fault			E&W 163	
Glaslyn Valley Fault				Brenchley & Rawson 2006
Glyn Ceiriog Fault			E&W 121	
Glyn Fault		Monmouthshire	E&W 249; Usk-Cwm:25K	
Glyn Valley Fault			E&W 135	
Glyn Wallis Fault			E&W 230	
Glyncorrwg Fault		Glamorganshire	E&W 231; 248	
Gnoll Fault		Glamorganshire	E&W 247	
Gop Fault		Flintshire	E&W 95	Mem E&W 95/107
Gors Fault		Glamorganshire	E&W 230, 247	
Gorsedd Bran Fault		Clwyd		Mem E&W 95/107
Gorseinon Fault		Glamorganshire	E&W 247	
Great Ewloe Fault			E&W 108	
Greenland Fault		Monmouthshire	E&W 232	
Gresford Fault			E&W 121	
Grib Fault			E&W 230	
Groes Fault		Clwyd	E&W 107	Mem E&W 95/107
Grovesend Fault		Glamorganshire	E&W 230; 247	
Guilsfield Fault		Powys	E&W 150, 151	Mem E&W 151/165
Gwaynynog Fault		Clwyd	E&W 107	Mem E&W 95/107
Gwern-ddu Fault		Monmouthshire		Mem E&W 233/250
Gwespyr Fault		Flintshire	E&W 96	
Gwili Fault		Glamorganshire	E&W 230, 247	
Gwrych Castle Fault		Denbighshire	E&W 95; 107	Mem E&W 95/107
Gyrnos Fault			E&W 231	

=== H ===
Fault name	OS map ref	County	BGS map sheet	book references
Hafan Fault			E&W 163	
Hawarden Fault			E&W 108	
Hendre Fault			E&W 230	
Highgate Fault		Powys	E&W 164; 165	Mem E&W 151/165
Hirwaun No 1 Fault			E&W 231	
Hirwaun No 2 Fault			E&W 231	
Hirwaun No 2a Fault			E&W 231	
Hirwaun No 3 Fault			E&W 231	
Hudnalls Fault		Monmouthshire		Mem E&W 233/250

=== I, J, K ===
Fault name	OS map ref	County	BGS map sheet	book references
Itton Fault		Monmouthshire		Mem E&W 233/250
John Grey's Fault		Glamorganshire	E&W 247	
Keepers Lodge Fault			E&W 230	
Kilkenny Fault		Glamorganshire	E&W 231; 249	
King's Wood Fault		Monmouthshire		Mem E&W 233/250
Kinmel Park Fault		Denbighshire	E&W 95	Mem E&W 95/107

=== L ===
Fault name	OS map ref	County	BGS map sheet	book references
Leeswood Fault			E&W 108	
Little Mill Fault			E&W 232	
Llanbadoc Fault		Monmouthshire	E&W 232; Usk-Cwm:25K	
Llancayo Fault		Monmouthshire	E&W 233	Mem E&W 233/250
Llandrindod - Pen-y-waun Fault Belt			E&W 213	
Llandyfan Fault			E&W 230	
Llandynan Fault			E&W 121	
Llanegryn Fault			E&W 149	
Llanelidan Fault			E&W 121	
Llanerchyraur Fault			E&W 164	
Llanerfyl Fault		Powys	E&W 150	
Llanfabon Fault		Glamorganshire	E&W 231; 249	
Llanfrechfa Fault		Monmouthshire	E&W 249; Usk-Cwm:25K	
Llangattock Fault				Mem E&W 233/250
Llanglydwen Fault			E&W 210; 211	
Llangollen - Llantysilio - Aqueduct Fault				Smith et al. 2005
Llangollen Fault			E&W 121	
Llangwm Fault		Monmouthshire		Mem E&W 233/250
Llangynidr Fault				Mem E&W 232
Llanhilleth Fault		Glamorganshire	E&W 249	
Llannefydd Fault		Clwyd	E&W 107	Mem E&W 95/107
Llanrhaeadr Fault		Clwyd	E&W 107	Mem E&W 95/107
Llantysilio Fault			E&W 121	
Llanvair Discoed Fault		Monmouthshire		Mem E&W 233/250
Llanvair Fault		Monmouthshire	E&W 250	
Llanvapley Fault				Mem E&W 232
Llanvihangel Fault		Monmouthshire		Mem E&W 233/250
Llanwonno Fault		Glamorganshire	E&W 248	
Llanwrtyd Fault			E&W 196	
Llanwrtyd Fault			E&W 213	
Llechwedd Fault			E&W 164	
Llethir Fault			E&W 230	
Llety Wilws Fault			E&W 230	
Llwyn Celyn Fault			E&W 230	
Llwyn Fault			E&W 165	
Llyfnant Fault			E&W 163	
Llysfaen Fault		Denbighshire	E&W 95	Mem E&W 95/107
Longoaks Fault		Glamorganshire	E&W 247	
Lunnon Fault		Glamorganshire	E&W 247	

=== M ===
Fault name	OS map ref	County	BGS map sheet	book references
Maen Fault		Clwyd		Mem E&W 95/107
Maes-gwyn (or Maes Gwyn) Fault		Clwyd	E&W 107	Mem E&W 95/107
Marian Ffrith (or Marianffrith) Fault		Flintshire	E&W 95	Mem E&W 95/107
Mathern Fault		Monmouthshire		Mem E&W 233/250
Mawddach Fault			E&W 149	
Melai Fault		Clwyd		Mem E&W 95/107
Menai Strait Fault System				Brenchley & Rawson 2006
Merthyr Church Fault		Glamorganshire	E&W 231; 249	
Meusydd Fault			E&W 230	
Minera Fault Belt			E&W 121	
Minffordd Fault				Brenchley & Rawson 2006
Mochras Fault		Merionethshire	E&W 135; 49	Brenchley & Rawson 2006
Moelfre Fault		Merionethshire	E&W 135	
Moel-Gilau Fault		Glamorganshire	E&W 248	
Montgomery Fault		Powys		Mem E&W 151/165
Morfa Fault		Glamorganshire	E&W 247, 248	
Morlais Fault		Glamorganshire	E&W 247	
Mount Pleasant Fault			E&W 230	
Mynydd Bach Fault			E&W 195	
Mynydd Bodrochwyn Fault		Clwyd		Mem E&W 95/107

=== N ===
Fault name	OS map ref	County	BGS map sheet	book references
Nant Cerrig Fault		Clwyd		Mem E&W 95/107
Nant Dyar Fault				Mem E&W 232
Nant Marl Fault			E&W 230	
Nant y Fedw Fault			E&W 196	
Nant-Figillt Fault			E&W 108	
Nantmor Fault		Gwynedd	E&W 119	
Nantygwrdy Fault			E&W 164	
Nantyricket Fault			E&W 164	
Nedern Fault		Monmouthshire		Mem E&W 233/250
Nercwys - Nant-Figillt Fault Zone			E&W 108	
New House Thrust			E&W 165	
Newcastle Fault		Monmouthshire		Mem E&W 233/250
Newlands Thrust		Glamorganshire	E&W 247, 248	
Newmarket Fault		Clwyd		Mem E&W 95/107
Newton Fault		Glamorganshire	E&W 247	
Newmarket Fault		Flintshire	E&W 95	
Newport Sands Fault			E&W 193; 210	
Nicholaston Fault		Glamorganshire	E&W 247	

=== O ===
Fault name	OS map ref	County	BGS map sheet	book references
Ochr-y-cefn Fault		Clwyd		Mem E&W 95/107
Ogof Cadno Fault			E&W 193	
Ogof Fault			E&W 163	
Olway Brook Fault		Monmouthshire		Mem E&W 233/250

=== P, Q ===
Fault name	OS map ref	County	BGS map sheet	book references
Palleg Fault			E&W 230	
Palmer's Lake Overthrusts		Pembrokeshire	E&W 244/5	
Pant Fault		Denbighshire	E&W 95	Mem E&W 95/107
Pant-y-fotty Fault		Clwyd		Mem E&W 95/107
Paper Mill Fault			E&W 108	
Parc Postyn Fault		Clwyd		Mem E&W 95/107
Pared Fault		Gwynedd	E&W 133	
Parwyd Fault		Gwynedd	E&W 133	
Pendaren Fault		Glamorganshire	E&W 249	
Penffordd Fault		Pembrokeshire	E&W 210	
Pengam Fault		Glamorganshire	E&W 249	
Pennal Fault			E&W 149; 150; 163	
Penrhiwfelen Fault		Glamorganshire	E&W 247	
Penterry Fault		Monmouthshire		Mem E&W 233/250
Pentre Clwydau Fault			E&W 231	
Pentre Felin Fault		Clwyd		Mem E&W 95/107
Pentre Llanharan Thrust		Glamorganshire	E&W 248	
Pentremawr Lag Fault		Carmarthenshire	E&W 229	
Pentre Tafarn-y-fedw Fault		Clwyd		Mem E&W 95/107
Pentwyn Fault (Mons)		Monmouthshire	E&W 249	
Pentwyn Fault (Glams)		Glamorganshire	E&W 249	
Pen-y-castell Fault		Glamorganshire	E&W 231, 248	
Penydarren Fault			E&W 231	
Pen-y-Fan Fault		Monmouthshire	E&W 232	
Pen-y-llan Fault		Monmouthshire	E&W 249; Usk-Cwm:25K	
Pen-y-parc Fault		Monmouthshire	E&W 249; Usk-Cwm:25K	
Plas Isaf Fault		Glamorganshire	E&W 247	
Pont Morlais Fault			E&W 230	
Pontarsais Fault			E&W 212	
Pont-y-ddol Fault		Clwyd		Mem E&W 95/107
Pontypool Road Fault		Monmouthshire	E&W 232	
Port Eynon Thrust		Glamorganshire	E&W 246	
Portskewett Hill Fault				Mem E&W 233/250
Prestatyn Fault		Clwyd	E&W 95	Mem E&W 95/107
Pwllau Bach Fault			E&W 231	
Pwllmawr Fault		Glamorganshire	E&W 247	
Pwll-meyric Fault		Monmouthshire		Mem E&W 233/250

=== R ===
Fault name	OS map ref	County	BGS map sheet	book references
Ramsey Fault		Pembrokeshire	E&W 209	
Rassau Fault				Mem E&W 232
Reservoir Fault		Monmouthshire		Mem E&W 233/250
Rhadyr Fault		Monmouthshire	Usk-Cwm:25K	Mem E&W 232
Rhaiadr Fault			E&W 137	
Rhiw Fault		Glamorganshire	E&W 249	
Rhiw Gwraidd Fault			E&W 179	
Rhobell Fracture				Brenchley & Rawson 2006
Rhos Fault		Glamorganshire	E&W 231; 232; 249	
Rhuallt Fault		Flintshire	E&W 95	Mem E&W 95/107
Rhydding Fault		Glamorganshire	E&W 230; 247	
Rhyd Sion Wynn Fault		Clwyd		Mem E&W 95/107
Rhyd-y-creua Fault		Clwyd		Mem E&W 95/107
Rhymney Fault				Mem E&W 232
Ritec Fault		Pembrokeshire		Brenchley & Rawson 2006
Road Uchaf Fault?				Brenchley & Rawson 2006
Rock Park Fault			E&W 196	
Rockfield Fault		Monmouthshire		Mem E&W 233/250

=== S ===
Fault name	OS map ref	County	BGS map sheet	book references
Sarn-Abersoch Thrust		Gwynedd	E&W 134	
Sawdde Fault			E&W 212	
Severn Valley Fault Belt			E&W 151	Toghill P. 2006
Siamber Wen Fault		Denbighshire	E&W 95; 107	Mem E&W 95/107
Sirhowy Fault		Monmouthshire	E&W 232	
Six Pit Fault		Glamorganshire	E&W 247	
Soflen Fault		Clwyd	E&W 107	Mem E&W 95/107
Soughton Fault			E&W 108	
St Arvans Fault		Monmouthshire		Mem E&W 233/250
St Brides Fault		Monmouthshire		Mem E&W 233/250
Stradey Fault		Carmarthenshire	E&W 229	
Strumble Head Fault		Pembrokeshire	E&W 210	
Swansea Fault		Glamorganshire	E&W 247	
Swansea Valley Fault			E&W 213	
Syddyn Fault		Carmarthenshire	E&W 229	

=== T ===
Fault name	OS map ref	County	BGS map sheet	book references
Tafalog Fault		Powys	E&W 150	
Taipellaf Fault		Clwyd		Mem E&W 95/107
Talgarth Fault		Monmouthshire		Mem E&W 233/250
Tal-y-coed Fault		Monmouthshire		Mem E&W 233/250
Tal-y-llyn Fault			E&W 149	
Tanant Fault			E&W 137	
Teifi Fault			E&W 212	
Tintern Fault		Monmouthshire		Mem E&W 233/250
Tirdonkin Fault		Glamorganshire	E&W 247	
Tonfannau Fault			E&W 149	
Trafle Fault		Glamorganshire	E&W 247	
Trawsfynydd - Cwm Bowyd Fault				Brenchley & Rawson 2006
Trawsfynydd Fault			MW&M:250K, E&W 135	
Tredegar Fault		Monmouthshire	E&W 231; 232	
Tre-fal-du Fault		Monmouthshire		Mem E&W 233/250
Trelleck Common Fault		Monmouthshire		Mem E&W 233/250
Trelleck Fault		Monmouthshire		Mem E&W 233/250
Tremadog Thrust Zone				Brenchley & Rawson 2006
Tre-'r-ddol Fault			E&W 163	
Trevethin Fault		Glamorganshire, Monmouthshire	E&W 232; 249	
Trinant Fault		Glamorganshire	E&W 249	
Tumble Fault			E&W 230	
Tweedle Fault			E&W 231	
Twrch Fechan Fault			E&W 230	
Twyn Sych Fault			E&W 231	
Ty Llwyd Fault			E&W 230	
Ty Mawr Fault		Clwyd		Mem E&W 95/107
Tyn-y-caeau Fault (Denb)		Denbighshire	E&W 95	Mem E&W 95/107
Ty'n-y-caeau Fault (Mons)		Monmouthshire	E&W 249; Usk-Cwm:25K	

=== U, V ===
Fault name	OS map ref	County	BGS map sheet	book references
Upper Artro Fault		Merionethshire	E&W 135	
Usk Fault		Monmouthshire		Mem E&W 233/250
Vale of Clwyd Fault		Denbighshire	E&W 121; 95	Mem E&W 95/107
Van Fault			E&W 164	

=== W, X, Y, Z ===
Fault name	OS map ref	County	BGS map sheet	book references
Warren Fault			E&W 230	
Welsh Borderland Fault				Smith et al. 2005
Welsh Borderland Fault System			UK (south) 625K	Brenchley & Rawson 2006
Wenallt Fault			E&W 164	
Werf Fault			E&W 231	
West Llangerniew Fault		Clwyd	E&W 107	Mem E&W 95/107
Weston Madoc Fault			E&W 165	
Wonastow Fault		Monmouthshire		Mem E&W 233/250
Wrexham Fault			E&W 121	
Yspytty Ifan Fault			E&W 120	
Ystwyth Fault			E&W 179	Mem E&W 151/165

== List of Disturbances ==
The following named features comprise both faulting and folding;

table of named disturbances
Disturbance name	OS map ref	County	BGS map sheet	book references
Caerbryn Disturbance		Carmarthenshire	E&W 230	
Carreg Cennen Disturbance		Carmarthenshire	E&W 230	
Clun Forest Disturbance				
Cribarth Disturbance		Powys	E&W 230, 231	
Llandyfaelog Disturbance		Carmarthenshire	E&W 231	
Llannon (or Llanon) Disturbance		Carmarthenshire	E&W 230	
Neath Disturbance			E&W 231	
Pontyclerc Disturbance		Carmarthenshire	E&W 230	
Saron Disturbance		Carmarthenshire	E&W 230	
Trimsaran Disturbance				

== See also ==
- List of geological faults of England
- List of geological faults of Northern Ireland
- List of geological faults of Scotland
- List of geological folds in Great Britain
- Geological structure of Great Britain
