= Carmel Head =

Coastal headland on Anglesey, Wales

Coordinates: 53.4033°N 4.5736°W

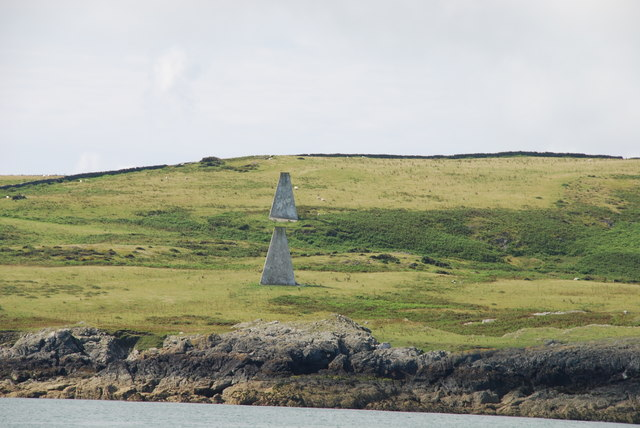
Carmel Head

Carmel Head (Welsh: Trwyn y Gadair) is a prominent coastal headland on the northwest tip of the island of Anglesey.

It is a designated SSSI because of its geological interest for the Carmel Head Thrust fault where Precambrian rocks have been pushed over younger Ordovician rocks creating the Carmel Head thrust. Rock exposures along the cliffs of Carmel Head include Precambrian gneisses, which are almost certainly the oldest rocks in Wales.

In the summer months the Anglesey Coastal Path passes over Carmel Head on a permissive path but in winter the path is closed to all for pheasant shooting. Most of the land on the head, which peaks at 81 metres above sea level, is owned and managed by the National Trust.

== Shipping and navigation ==
Off-shore from the head lie the islands of the Skerries and to the east of the Skerries three further islands, West Mouse, Middle Mouse and East Mouse. On West Mouse is a large white-painted column which is matched on Carmel Head by two further columns, known locally as the "Three White Ladies". They were constructed in the 1860s as navigation aids: lining up the three columns marks the position of a shallow reef offshore that was a grave danger to shipping.

Ships that ran into problems at Carmel's Head include :

- 1829 Brigantine Brown of Whitehaven ran aground with cargo of cattle. Captain drowned but cargo saved.
- 1854 The 'flat' John and Mary went onshore at Carmel Point and flooded with the tide. Crew saved.
- 1885 The four-masted ship The Earl of Chatham ran aground 5 October. Crew saved, ship wrecked.
- 1886 Sailing ship James Kenway with cargo bound from Liverpool to Charleston foundered on the rocks. Vessel lost, 2 crew drowned.
- 1890 Swedish Barque Hudiksvall was under tow when the line parted and she foundered on Carmel Point, the crew were saved.
- 1897 Cargo ship Arthur of Dublin ran aground, hauled off by tug.
- 1898 Schooner City of Chester aground West side of Carmel Head. Wrecked.
- 1913 Yacht Acorn aground at Carmel Head, refloated undamaged.
- 1913 Steam trawler Lorwoone ran aground in fog. The captain swam ashore, and walked 3 miles to Holyhead to get the lifeboat which recovered the trawler.
- 1939 The liner Hilary ran aground on a journey from Brazil to Liverpool (intending to take on a pilot at Holyhead). 100 passengers were taken off by lifeboat; she was refloated under her own power.
- 1953 The 493-ton steamer Larchfield ran onto the rocks. She was holed but refloated and beached, and later returned to service.

== Copper mine ==
A copper mine, known as the Great Carmel's Points copper mine and also as the Gadair Mine, was sited here in the early 19th century. The copper ore vein found here was hoped to be an extension of the copper found at Parys Mountain. Work on the mine was suspended in the mid-19th century but resumed again c. 1866. Although only about 170 feet deep, levels were driven over 1500 feet following a vein some 30 feet wide, six vertical shafts connected the mining levels with the surface. However, the mine never discovered the quantities of ore hoped for and was abandoned around 1880. The mine equipment was sold in 1883, and included a 30-HP beam engine with flywheel and pumping and winding gear, as well as the boiler to power it. There are ruins of the copper mine and offices still in existence, including a well-preserved chimney stack.
