= Berw Fault =

Geologic fault in north-west Wales

Coordinates: 53.22°N 4.34°W

The Berw Fault is a southwest–northeast trending Late Palaeozoic to Cenozoic brittle fault that reactivates an older zone of ductile shear, the Berw Shear Zone. It forms the northwesternmost part of the [[Menai Strait Fault Zone]], which also includes the Dinorwic and Aber Dinlle faults. On Anglesey and offshore to the northeast, it forms the southeastern boundary of the Berw Basin, in the southern part of the East Irish Sea Basin.

== Extent ==
The Berw Fault was originally defined at the surface on Anglesey where it juxtaposes Carboniferous sedimentary rocks to the northwest with strongly sheared Penmynydd Zone metamorphic rocks and parts of the Monian Supergroup to the southeast. Seismic reflection data in the neighbouring offshore areas have extended it significantly further to the southwest and particularly to the northeast, where it controls the margin of the Berw Basin, cutting Permo-Triassic rocks.

== Development ==
The Berw Shear Zone forms the upper part of the Penmynydd Zone, also known as the Penmynydd Terrane, a highly deformed, schistose unit that contains blueschist assemblages. The Penmynydd Zone has been identified on seismic reflection data offshore, as a zone of strong northwest-dipping reflectivity. Later brittle faults, such as the Berw Fault, are interpreted to detach into the top of the zone.

The protolith of the Penmynydd Zone was formed at least 590–580 mya (million years ago) during the Ediacaran period. The high-pressure, low temperature metamorphism that formed the blueschist is dated in the range 580–580 mya, interpreted to date the subduction of this unit. The Berw Shear Zone forms the boundary between the Penmynydd and Aberffraw terranes, thought to be a result of sinistral (left-lateral) strike-slip faulting during the Acadian phase of the Caledonian orogeny.

The Berw Fault was formed by reactivation of the Berw Shear Zone during the Carboniferous, where it was active as a northwest-dipping normal fault, creating the Berw Basin, a half-graben. Although other faults that were active during the Carboniferous in the area show evidence of reverse reactivation during the Variscan orogeny, there is no evidence that the Berw Fault was active at this time. During the Permian and Triassic periods, the structure was active once more as a normal fault, as part of the opening of the East Irish Sea Basin. The final known phase of activity of the Berw Fault was during the Cenozoic when it moved ~ 1.5 km in a sinistral strike-slip sense, based on the offset of magnetic anomalies associated with dykes intruded as part of the late Paleocene North Atlantic Igneous Province.

== See also ==
- List of geological faults of Wales
