= Claerwen Fault =

Geological fault in Great Britain

Coordinates: 52.26°N 3.66°W

The Claerwen Fault is a major SW-NE trending fault in central Wales. It was active as a normal fault during deposition of Late Ordovician to mid-Silurian sedimentary rocks, downthrowing to the northwest. The estimated throw on the fault increases from about 100 m at a shallow level to about 1000 m at depth. There is no discernible change in the grade of metamorphism associated with the Caledonian Orogeny across the fault, suggesting that it was not reactivated later.

== See also ==
- List of geological faults of Wales
