= Central Wales Lineament =

Fault zone in Great Britain

The Central Wales Lineament is a north–south aligned zone of geological faults and folds which runs for scores of kilometres through Wales and which gives rise to a number of landscape features. The lineament lies along the axis of the Central Wales Syncline, both following the generally northeast–southwest Caledonide trend though its central section is more north–south aligned.

The Tafolog Fault which runs north from Llanbrynmair is one component structure in the central section of the lineament and along which Cwm Tafolog has been eroded. The Dylife Fault, a southerly continuation of the same fault is coincident with the valley of the Afon Twymyn. The section of the valley east of the former lead-mining village of Dylife is spectacularly incised into the landscape making this one of the most readily recognisable parts of the lineament. The lineament continues southwards as a series of offset north–south faults, crossing the Wye valley just west of Llangurig. The lineament continues south passing through the top end of Cwm Ystwyth where it meets the head of the Elan valley and then southwest where its main component is the Claerwen Fault.

== Geological context ==
The lineament follows the axial zone of the Silurian–Devonian Central Wales Syncline but cuts the fold pattern with a dense swarm of steep, mainly dextral strike-slip faults. These faults offset strata by up to 1 km and form a long-lived transfer zone that accommodated differential shortening between the Irish Sea basin to the west and the Midland Platform to the east.

== Structural history ==
Kinematic indicators show an early sinistral phase linked to late Ordovician–Silurian Caledonian convergence. During the Acadian (Devonian) event the same fractures were reactivated as oblique-dextral shear zones under NNW–SSE compression; fractures now dip steeply east and carry low-temperature mylonites and quartz–chlorite slickensides.

A third phase of brittle reactivation occurred in the late Carboniferous to Permian, generating metre-wide dilatant cavities later infilled by hydrothermal fluids. Lead-isotope ages cluster between 330 Ma and 280 Ma, confirming that mineralisation post-dates Acadian folding.

== Mineralisation and landscape expression ==
This late fracturing localised the Central Wales Orefield, a 60 km^{2}-belt of Pb-Zn-Ba-Ag veins extending from Dylife to Rhayader. Mine records cite grades of 10 % Pb and 5 % Zn over 1 m widths in the Twymyn and Claerwen lodes, with cumulative production greater than 3 million tonnes of ore between 1760 and 1920. Erosion along the mineralised faults has carved a line of steep, straight valleys—including Cwm Tafolog, Afon Twymyn and the head of Cwm Ystwyth—that make the lineament visible in satellite imagery.
