= Cosheston Group =

Geological group in west Wales

- Stratigraphic range: Lochkovian to Emsian (Devonian)
- Type: Group
- Unit of: Old Red Sandstone Supergroup
- Sub-units: New Shipping Formation, Lawrenny Cliff Formation, Mill Bay Formation, Burton Cliff Formation, Llanstadwell Formation
- Underlies: Avon Group (unconformity)
- Overlies: Gelliswick Bay Formation
- Thickness: up to 1800m

Lithology
- Primary: sandstones, siltstones
- Other: conglomerates

Location
- Country: Wales
- Extent: south Pembrokeshire

Type section
- Named for: Cosheston

The Cosheston Group is an early Devonian lithostratigraphic group (a sequence of rock strata) in west Wales. The name is derived from the village of Cosheston in south Pembrokeshire. The Group comprises (in ascending order) the Llanstadwell, Burton Cliff, Mill Bay, Lawrenny Cliff and New Shipping formations. The strata are exposed in the Milford Haven area of southern Pembrokeshire where several partial type sections are defined. The outcrop extends around the northern and southern shores of the Haven. It is bounded to the north by the Benton Fault between the villages of Rosemarket and Lawrenny, and extends east to New Shipping and west almost to the town of Milford Haven itself. The rocks of this group have also previously been known as the Cosheston Beds.

== Stratigraphy ==
=== Llanstadwell, Burton Cliff and Mill Bay formations ===
This sequence is largely green sandstones with lesser amounts of red sandstone and including intraformational conglomerates and some siltstones.

=== Lawrenny Cliff and New Shipping formations ===
These are similar to the underlying formations but are characterised by a coarser grain size. Conglomerates in these two formations have a great diversity of clasts within them.
