= Aber Dinlle Fault =

Geologic fault in north-west Wales

Coordinates: 53.18°N 4.13°W

- Country: Wales
- Region: North Wales

Characteristics
- Part of: Menai Strait Fault System

The Aber Dinlle Fault is a SW-NE trending fault in North Wales. It forms part of the Menai Strait Fault System, with the Berw and Dinorwic Faults. It lies close to the epicentre of the 1984 Llŷn Peninsula earthquake, although it is not thought to have been responsible for that event. The fault was active during deposition of Ordovician rocks in the Welsh Basin. It was reactivated as a normal fault in the Carboniferous with a downthrow to the northwest and again reactivated as a reverse fault during Late Carboniferous inversion associated with the Variscan Orogeny.

== See also ==
- List of geological faults of Wales
