= Beddgelert Fault =

Volcanotectonic fault in North Wales

Coordinates: 53.01°N 4.08°W

Beddgelert Fault is a geological structure in Snowdonia, North Wales. It is a southwest to northeast running fault formed by volcanic activity and earth movements during the middle Ordovician period (about 460 million years ago), following the general structural direction common to the Caledonian mountain-building event in northern Britain. First documented in 1881, it forms part of a collapsed volcanic basin known as the Snowdon caldera. The fault played a critical role in the development of the volcanic landscape of Snowdonia and provides evidence for mid-Ordovician tectonic activity in Wales.

== Geological setting and characteristics ==
The Beddgelert Fault separates the Snowdon syncline to the west and northwest from the Gwynant–Glaslyn valley to the east and southeast. These areas represent different stratigraphical successions of Ordovician rocks. The belt of volcanic rocks in the Gwynant-Glaslyn valley is separated from the Snowdon syncline by sediments in an anticlinal core known as the Yr Aran Anticline, with the southeastern limb of this anticline absent due to the mechanical contact along the Beddgelert Fault.

Near the town of Beddgelert, the fault is exposed as a complex zone of lenticles on a cliff known as Craig-yr-Adwy, where the relationships between the different rock successions can be clearly observed. The fault is predominantly a single structure, but in places forms a complex zone.

A key characteristic of the Beddgelert Fault is that it is pre-cleavage, meaning the steeply-inclined cleavage in the rocks is neither crushed nor deflected across it. This indicates that the fault formed before the main Caledonian deformation that produced the cleavage.

The Beddgelert Fault Zone played an important role in the development of mineralisation in the Snowdon caldera. Studies by Lusty and colleagues (2017) indicate that this fault zone was a major structural control for hydrothermal fluid flow during the Caradoc period. The fault zone contains numerous base metal sulfide veins and stockworks, particularly concentrated along an arcuate central corridor within the caldera. These mineralized structures are interpreted to represent volcanogenic pipe-style sulfide mineralization that formed during caldera resurgence, which led to reactivation of existing structures and the opening of normal faults.

== Formation and evolution ==
According to research by Nicholas Rast, the evolution of the Beddgelert Fault during the mid-Caradocian times involved a complex sequence of geological events. The process began with the deposition of shallow-water Glanrafon Grits, followed by a period of uplift and possible erosion. Subsequently, the Pitt's Head Flow, an ignimbrite, was deposited across the area. The next stage involved faulting and uplift of the Snowdon block to the west and northwest of the fault, which resulted in partial erosion of the Pitt's Head Flow, while much of it remained on the downthrow side. This was followed by the deposition of the Flinty Flow on a subaerial surface, although much of this flow was eroded away in the valley that had formed to the southeast of the fault. Later, lahar (volcanic mud-flow) was deposited in this valley, completely filling it. Further faulting then produced a mechanical junction between the Flinty Flow and the Lahar Series. The entire area was subsequently covered by ignimbrites of the Lower Rhyolitic Tuffs. The final stage in this sequence involved additional faulting and the probable penecontemporaneous (nearly contemporary) injection of the Pitt's Head breccias as vertical bosses.

== Significance ==
The Beddgelert Fault is important for several reasons. The fault formed part of a graben system within the collapsed Snowdon caldera structure. It was later a focus for felsic intrusions and hydrothermal activity. The fault and similar large strike faults in Snowdonia (such as along the Nanmor Valley) provide evidence of mid-Ordovician tectonism that predates the main Caledonian orogeny. The Beddgelert Fault and associated structures challenge earlier interpretations of Ordovician stratigraphy in Wales that had been based primarily on a geosyncline model. The identification of subaerial ignimbrites and the unconformable relationships along the fault suggest a more complex palaeogeography with periods of emergence and submergence. The fault helps explain the distribution of different volcanic rock types in Snowdonia. The fault's Caledonoid trend is shared by rhyolite plugs in the Gwynant-Glaslyn Valley and Yr-Arddu syncline, and by stout rhyolite sheets on the northwestern limb of the Snowdon syncline, suggesting a common structural control.

The Beddgelert Fault Zone was a primary pathway for hydrothermal fluids during the evolution of the Snowdon caldera. Despite the suitable tectonic setting for volcanogenic massive sulfide deposits, the shallow marine environment (10–200 m water depth) of the Snowdon caldera likely promoted subsurface boiling and the formation of vein-type rather than seafloor mineralization. The fault zone hosts multiple mineral occurrences, including significant deposits at Hafod-y-Porth, Lliwedd, and other localities, which provide insights into ore-forming processes in submarine volcanic environments.

== See also ==
- List of geological faults of Wales
