= Bala Fault =

Geological fault in Great Britain

Coordinates: 52.59°N 4.07°W

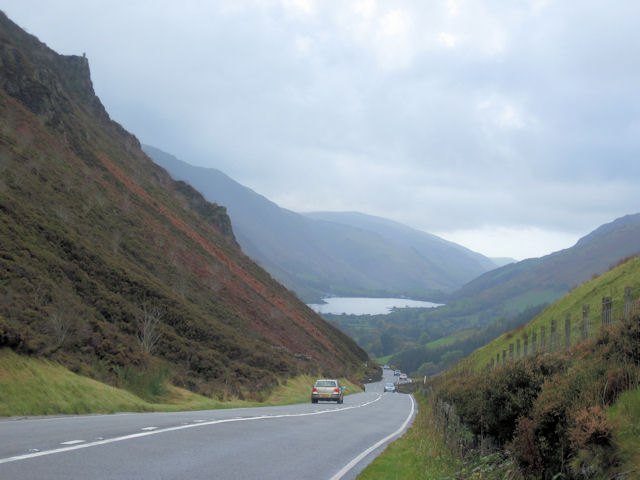
View south-west along the fault line with Talyllyn Lake in the valley bottom

The Bala Fault is a SW-NE trending geological fault in Wales that extends offshore into Cardigan Bay. In the offshore area it is a major normal fault and forms the bounding structure to the Cardigan Bay Basin, with a fill including about 2,500 metres (8,200 ft) of Lias Group. Onshore, it is responsible for the lineament which runs through Bala and south of Cadair Idris to the coast at Tywyn. At its northeastern end it links to the similarly orientated Llanelidan Fault.

The fault is believed to have experienced two separate stages of movement. The horizons between the upper Carboniferous sequence and the underlying Jurassic sequence are parallel, so little rotational movement occurred during the first stage. The second stage of movement happened in the middle-to-late Jurassic period, when strong rotation happened, up to 24 degrees.

== Geological evolution and regional context ==
The Bala Fault is part of a broader geological feature known as the Bala Lineament, a system of major faults arranged en echelon (in a stepped, parallel pattern) that includes the Tal-y-Llyn, Bala, and Bryneglwys. Early geological mapping of Wales identified these structures, with the Bryn Eglwys Fault first recognised by Adam Sedgwick in 1845 and the Bala Fault by Andrew Crombie Ramsay in 1881.

Geophysical evidence suggests the lineament may have originated in late Precambrian times (over 540 million years ago) as a strike-slip structure. Throughout the Lower Palaeozoic era (about 540–420 million years ago), the Bala Lineament influenced sedimentation patterns, creating a complex arrangement of uplifted blocks (horsts) and subsiding troughs (grabens). Unlike some other Welsh lineaments, the Bala system did not develop a discrete identity until after the end-Caledonian regional deformation, when it became an important zone of strike-slip faulting during the Variscan Orogeny (mountain-building event).

A distinctive feature of the Bala Lineament is the interaction between northeast-southwest trending faults and north-south structures. This arrangement created a distinctive pattern that influenced the geology of the Welsh Basin. During the Carboniferous period (359–299 million years ago), sedimentation in northeast Wales was strongly influenced by contemporary movement along the lineament, with significant thickness variations in sedimentary deposits across the faults. The lineament's influence extended into later geological periods, with offshore extensions affecting the formation of the Mesozoic and Tertiary sedimentary basins in Cardigan Bay. The Tremadog Bay and Cardigan Bay Basins, which contain younger sedimentary rocks, are bounded by faults that appear to be reactivated elements of the older Bala Lineament system.

At depth, the Bala Fault system likely consists of a complex arrangement of faults with varying orientations. The original Lower Palaeozoic structures were probably normal faults with a listric (curved) geometry, flattening with depth, while the later strike-slip faults would have maintained steeper angles into the deeper crust. This long-lived fault system continues to influence the geological structure of Wales today, with evidence of neotectonic (recent geological) activity documented along portions of the lineament, particularly at its northeastern end and in its offshore extension.

== Tectonic significance and seismicity ==
The Bala Fault is one of the major geological structures in Wales, running in a northeast-southwest direction through mid-Wales. It appears clearly visible on satellite imagery as a prominent linear feature. The fault has probably been associated with seismic activity (earthquakes) throughout both historical and instrumental recording periods.

Near its northern end, the Bala Fault divides into several secondary faults, including the Bryneglwys, Llangollen and Glyn Ceiriog faults. Deep seismic surveys (known as WINCH line 4) have revealed that beneath Cardigan Bay, the fault appears as a discontinuous, weak reflector with a northeast-dipping angle of about 25–30 degrees. This structure extends under the Cardigan Bay Basin, where it forms the southern boundary of Mesozoic sediments (rocks formed approximately 252–66 million years ago) that have accumulated in what geologists term a "half-graben" – a depression formed when land drops down on one side of a fault.

== Earthquake activity ==
Seismological studies suggest that the Bala Fault may be seismically active, particularly at its northern extension. A cluster of earthquake events has been recorded around Llangollen, which delineates the northern extension of the fault and highlights the roughly east-west trend of the Glyn Ceiriog fault. Two significant seismic events recorded in Cardigan Bay may indicate that the western extension of the Bala Fault is also active in this area.

The current stress field affecting Wales, with a northwest-southeast direction of maximum horizontal stress, means that low to moderate dipping planes with a northeast-southwest orientation (such as the Bala Fault) can experience significant forces that might trigger seismic activity. This could explain the earthquake activity tentatively associated with the fault.

== See also ==
- List of geological faults of Wales
