= Bryneglwys Fault =

Geological fault in Great Britain

Bryneglwys Fault is a geological fault in Wales that runs in a generally north-eastern direction. It intersects with the Llanelidan Fault and is in the Vale of Clwyd. It forms the southern boundary of the area between Llanelidan and Bryneglwys in Denbighshire, and is considered by some geologists to be the north-eastern extension of the larger Bala Fault system.

== Geological significance ==
The fault represents a significant tectonic feature in the North Wales region, with its downthrow (the direction in which rocks have been displaced) to the north-west. This displacement has resulted in the reappearance of part of the Llangollen synclinorium (a series of folded rock layers) in the Moel Truan area and the Bryneglwys valley.

Geological evidence suggests that the Bryneglwys Fault was active during multiple periods. Initial movement likely occurred in the Devonian period (about 419–359 million years ago), with substantial additional displacement during post-Carboniferous times (after 299 million years ago). The fault's early movement appears to be closely related to pre-Carboniferous folding, as evidenced by the overlap of lower members of the Carboniferous limestone at Corwen.

== Tectonic context ==
The Bryneglwys Fault, along with the parallel Llanelidan Fault to the north, played a crucial role in the tectonic development of northeastern Wales. The area between these two major faults experienced considerable crushing and folding as it was caught between these structural boundaries during periods of earth movement.

Studies of the regional geology indicate that there was likely relative movement towards the north-east on the south-eastern side of the Bryneglwys Fault during later tectonic events. This displacement is part of a broader pattern of torsional movement that affected the entire region of south-eastern Denbighshire and adjoining areas of Merionethshire and Flintshire.

The rocks displaced by the fault are primarily Silurian in age (444–419 million years old), particularly from the Ludlow Group, containing characteristic fossils such as graptolites that have helped geologists determine the relative ages of the displaced rock units.

== See also ==
- List of geological faults of Wales
