= Transfer zone =

A transfer zone in geology is an area where deformational strain is transferred from one structural element to another typically from fault to fault in rift systems. Therefore, listric faults and monoclinal folds in the hanging wall are typical structures linked by transfer zones; however, complexities do exist. The terms interbasin and intrabasin transfer zones have been proposed to delineate the magnitude of the transfer zone. Transfer zones can be described according to the fault dip directions; synthetic or conjugate and according to their deformation style; convergent or divergent. Transfer zones can be further identified by its maturity or (fault propagation evolution); whether the major fault relationship is approaching, overlapping, collateral or collinear. Since transfer zones are normally found in extensional settings many studies have been done within the East African Rift system and the Gulf of Suez rift system. Transfer zones have also played a role in hydrocarbon exploration and extraction within the Albertine graben.

== Interbasin transfer zones ==
Interbasin transfer zones often deal with major boundary rifts. Interbasin transfer zones could be interbasin ridges, broad faulted highs, or major relay ramps, all which have a large influence on the rift system.

== Intrabasin transfer zones ==
Intrabasin transfer zones are within the constraints of the interbasin transfer zones and are normally an order of magnitude smaller. Intrabasin transfer zones could be relay ramps within en echelon normal faults, or minor fault jogs. The southern margin of the Gulf of Evvia near Atalanti shows the magnitude of difference between interbasin transfer zones with accommodating distances up to 10 km as well as intrabasin transfer zones that accommodate approximately 1 km or less.

== Synthetic transfer zones ==
Synthetic transfer zones must have major normal faults dipping in the same direction. This includes relay ramps. Relay ramps have been studied within the East African Rift system (Lake Malawi) and the Gulf of Suez rift system. Transfer zone drainage basins consist of any sediments that will eventually travel through the transfer zone and in the half graben. The Gulf of Evvia is an example where a relay ramp plays a major role in drainage. Footwall drainage is limited in the Gulf of Evvia while transfer zone drainage is more pronounced. Since size of the drainage basin is one of the major controls on sediment flux, both interbasin and intrabasin synthetic relay ramp type transfer zones must have a major influence on sedimentation into the overall system. While intrabasin transfer zones are smaller they still act as a conduit for sedimentation.

== Conjugate transfer zones ==
Conjugate transfer zones must have major normal faults dipping in the opposite direction. This classification can be further divided into convergent and divergent transfer zones.

=== Convergent transfer zones ===
Convergent transfer zones dip toward each other and in result more complex faulting and folding can occur in the zones between them.

=== Divergent transfer zones ===
Divergent transfer zones dip in opposite direction and often result in topographical highs.

== Transfer zone fault propagation evolution ==
Major fault boundaries within rift systems tend to expand with time based on the assumption that the extensional stress and strain is consistent in a given rift system. Transfer zones have been identified according to the fault propagation evolution; they include approaching, overlapping, collateral, and collinear. This classification assists in visualization and deformational history of the transfer zone.

=== Approaching ===
When transfer zones are in the approaching stage the major boundary faults have not propagated past one another yet.

=== Overlapping ===
Transfer zones are in the overlapping stage when the major boundary faults have propagated past one another. This only includes faults that are partially overlapping.

=== Collateral ===
Collateral transfer zones include area where faults are completely parallel and overlapping. The geometry is frequently seen in horst and graben structures.

=== Collinear ===
Collinear transfer zones include areas which the major fault boundaries are in line with one another. In many cases this geometry relies on the faults to splay at their terminations and interfinger with one another.

== Transfer Zones in the East African Rift ==
While the East African Rift system is experiencing profound extension the transfer zones that link major extensional faults do not experience this extension. Transfer zones within the East African Rift are most commonly in the overlapping stage but every stage has been observed. Here, transfer zones are generally high areas with complex internal fault geometries. These general high areas generally are conjugate divergent type zones and have been observed in the Tanganyika rift and Albertine rift of Uganda. These broad highs can have vast effect of drainage as they can potentially split basins. Synthetic relay ramp style transfer zones are frequently observed in Lake Malawi. Brief examples have been given but all types within the synthetic and conjugate classification have been observed in the East African rift system.

== Transfer zones in the Gulf of Suez rift ==
Suez rift transfer zones are similar to the East African Rift transfer zones in that potentially any classification type and stage can be seen. However a study has shown that the transfer of deformation in transfer zones can be accomplished in two ways; through faults or accommodation zones between two opposite dipping normal faults in a horst and graben. A few kilometers south of Cairo there are en echelon minor faults between two major faults that produce a relay ramp style transfer zone. In the northern part of the Suez rift system the Gharandal transfer zone accommodates deformation in a broad anticlinal structure between two listric faults in a collateral horst and graben.

== Transfer zones and hydrocarbon exploration ==
Transfer zones such as relay ramps can affect drainage within basins which in return can produce thickness trends. Understanding the drainage network in these extensional setting allows geologist to better identify lateral and vertical depositional facies. The Kaiso-Tonya, Butiaba-Wanseko, and the Pakwach transfer zones in the Albertine graben all contain hydrocarbons. The Kaiso-Tonya is a full graben style transfer zone much like conjugate convergent collateral types. The Butiaba-Wanseko, and the Pakwach transfer zones are relay ramp style transfer zones.
