= Old Red Sandstone =

Assemblage of rocks in the North Atlantic region

- Stratigraphic range: Late Silurian – earliest Carboniferous 419–358 Ma
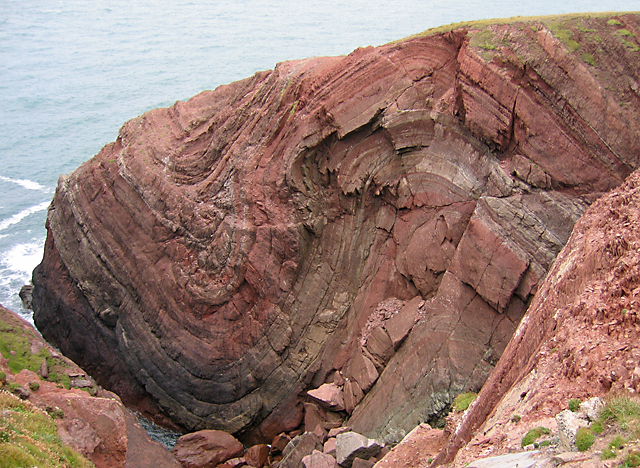
- Folded Old Red Sandstone rock formation at St Ann's Head in Pembrokeshire, Wales
- Type: Supergroup
- Sub-units: See text
- Thickness: More than 4 km (13,000 ft) (Shetland)

Lithology
- Primary: Sandstone
- Other: Conglomerate, shale, mudstone, siltstone, limestone

Location
- Region: North Atlantic
- Country: Canada, Estonia, Greenland, Ireland, Norway, United Kingdom
- Extent: 700 km (430 mi)

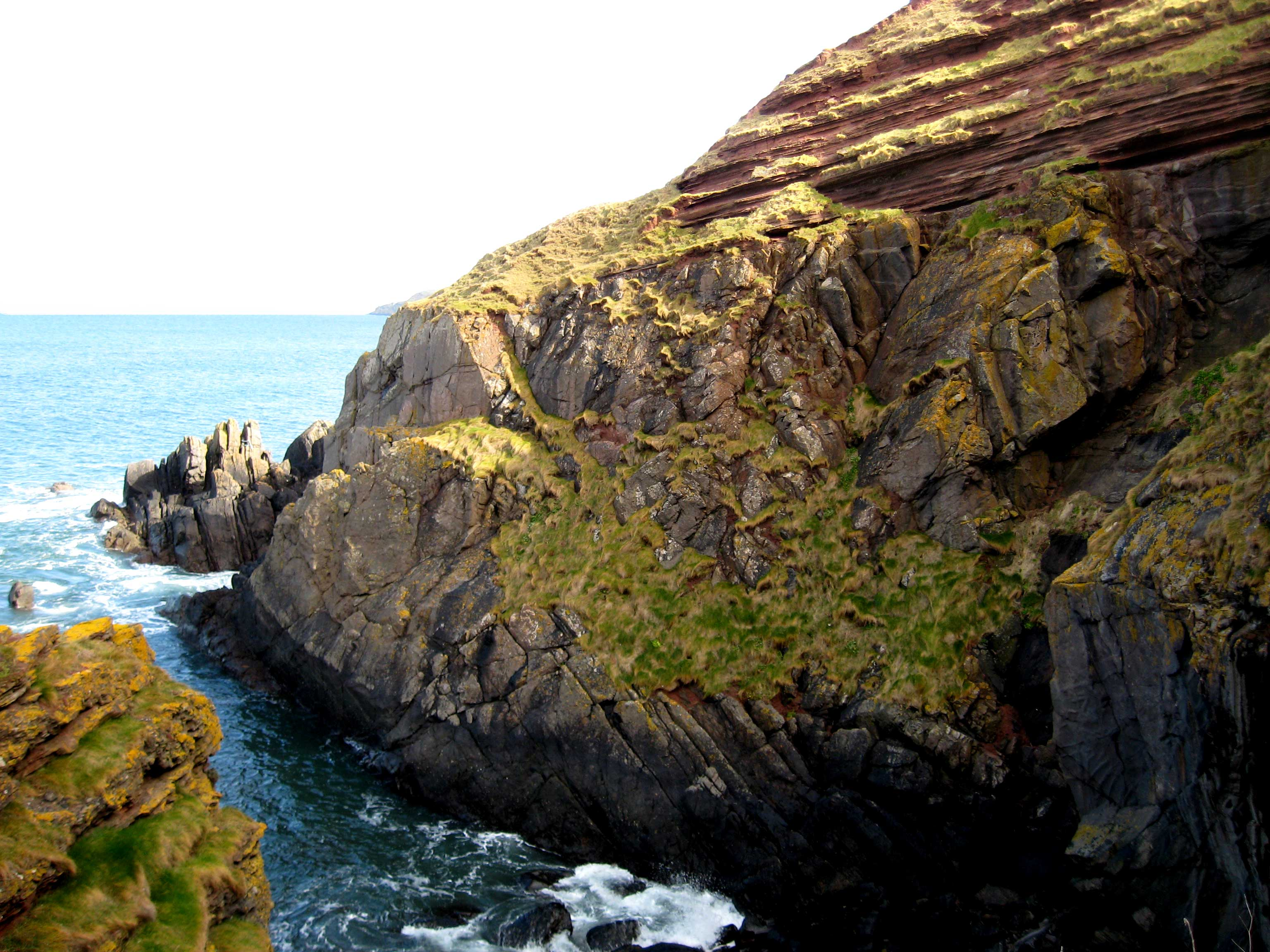
Hutton's angular unconformity at Siccar Point where 370-million-year-old Devonian Old Red Sandstone overlies 435-million-year-old Silurian greywacke

Old Red Sandstone, abbreviated ORS, is an assemblage of rocks in the North Atlantic region largely of Devonian age. It extends in the east across Great Britain, Ireland and Norway, and in the west along the eastern seaboard of North America. It also extends northwards into Greenland and Svalbard. These areas were a part of the paleocontinent of Euramerica (Laurussia). In Britain it is a lithostratigraphic unit (a sequence of rock strata) to which stratigraphers accord supergroup status and which is of considerable importance to early paleontology. The presence of Old in the name is to distinguish the sequence from the younger New Red Sandstone which also occurs widely throughout Britain.

== Sedimentology ==
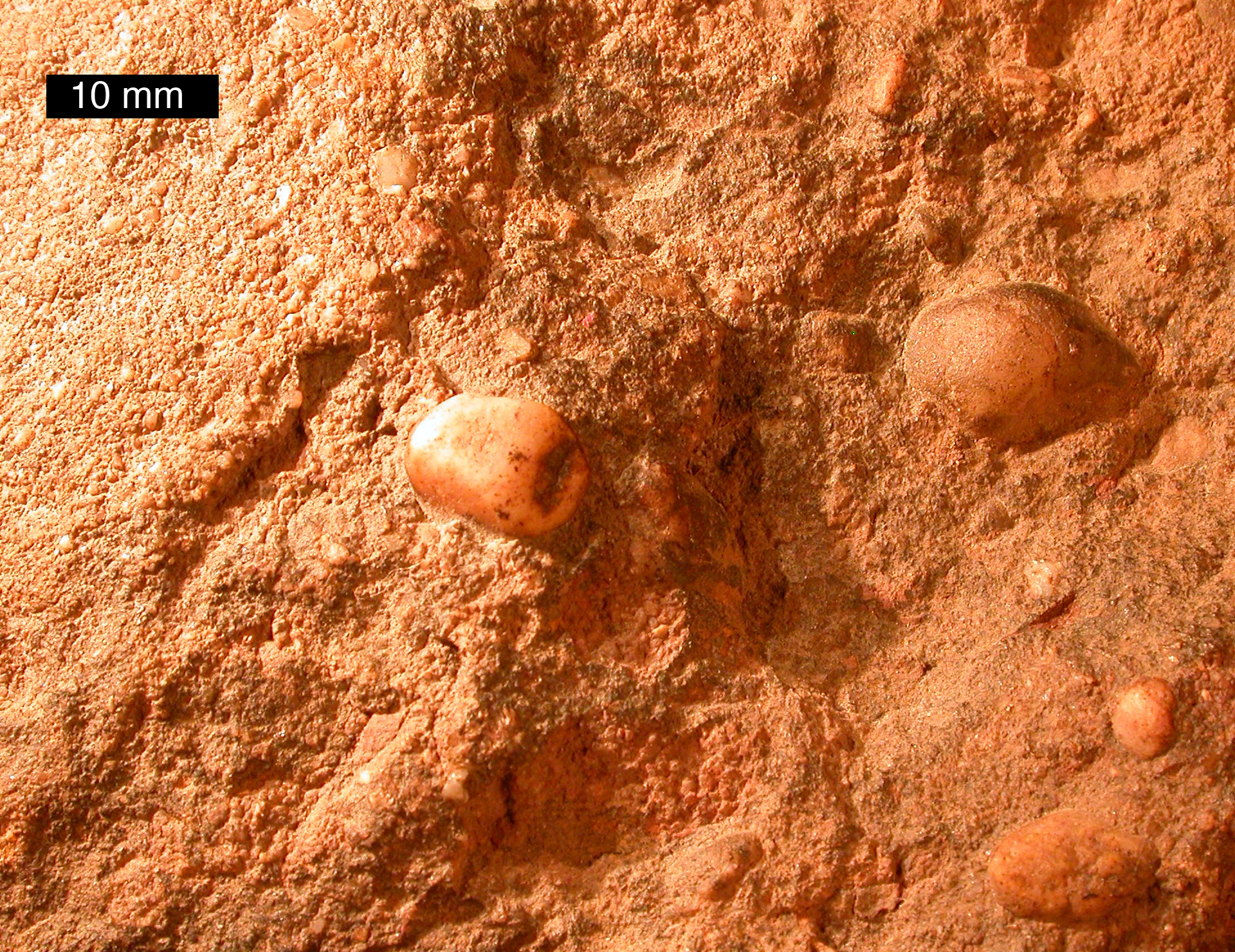
Bedding plane of Old Red Sandstone with quartz and chert pebbles, central England; scale bar is 10 mm.

The Old Red Sandstone describes a group of sedimentary rocks deposited in a variety of environments in the late Silurian, through the Devonian and into the earliest part of the Carboniferous. The body of rock, or facies, is dominated by terrigenous deposits and conglomerates at its base, and progresses to a combination of dunes, and sediments that may have been laid down in lakes, river, estuaries, and possibly other coastal environments. The Old Red Sandstone was long thought to have been deposited mostly in freshwater, but more recent studies have discovered marine fossils (such as brachiopods) in some locations. Its vertebrate fauna also occurs in typically marine environments, and an isotopic study also found significant marine influence indicating a brackish environment in mineralised tissues of its vertebrates, even in taxa that had long been thought to have been freshwater inhabitants. Thus, at least some strata appear to have been deposited on the coast, probably in marginal marine environments.

The familiar red colour of these rocks arises from the presence of iron oxide, but not all the Old Red Sandstone is red or sandstone – the sequence also includes conglomerates, mudstones, siltstones and thin limestones and colours can range from grey and green through to red and purple. These deposits are closely associated with the erosion of the Caledonian Mountain chain which was thrown up by the collision of the former continents of Avalonia, Baltica and Laurentia to form the Old Red Sandstone Continent – an event known as the Caledonian Orogeny.

Many fossils are found within the rocks, including early fishes, arthropods and plants. As is typical with terrestrial red beds, the vast majority of the rock is not fossil-bearing; however there are isolated, localized beds within the rock that do contain fossils. Rocks of this age were also laid down in South West England (hence the name 'Devonian', from Devon) though these are of true marine origin and are not included within the Old Red Sandstone.

== Stratigraphy ==
Since the Old Red Sandstone consists predominantly of rocks of terrestrial origin, it does not generally contain marine fossils which would otherwise prove useful in correlating one occurrence of the rock with another, both between and within individual sedimentary basins. Accordingly, local stage names were devised and these remain in use to some extent today though there is an increasing use of international stage names. Thus in the Anglo-Welsh Basin, there are frequent references to the Downtonian, Dittonian, Breconian and Farlovian stages in the literature. The existence of a number of distinct sedimentary basins throughout Britain has been established.

=== Orcadian Basin ===
The Orcadian Basin extends over a wide area of North East Scotland and the neighbouring seas. It encompasses the Moray Firth and adjoining land areas, Caithness, Orkney and parts of Shetland. South of the Moray Firth, two distinct sub-basins are recognized at Turriff and at Rhynie. The sequence is more than four kilometres (13,000 ft) thick in parts of Shetland. The main basin is considered to be an intramontane basin resulting from crustal rifting associated with post-Caledonian extension, possibly accompanied by strike-slip faulting along the Great Glen Fault system.

=== Argyll ===
There are a scatter of exposures of the Old Red Sandstone around Oban and the Isle of Kerrera on the West Highland coast, this unit is sometimes referred to as the Kerrera Sandstone Formation. The unit is up to 128 m thick in its type area and consists of green and red sandstones and conglomerates, typically containing large (10–30 cm or 4–12 in across) elliptical well rounded clasts, accompanied by siltstones, mudstones and limestones. On Kerrera a conglomerate of andesite boulders rests unconformably on Dalradian black, pyritic slates (Easdale Slate) of the Easdale Subgroup. At Oban there is merely an erosional contact incorporating debris of the slate in a basal conglomerate. The ORS deposits around Oban are considered latest Silurian (Pridoli) to earliest Devonian in age. They are interpreted as alluvial fans which filled a depositional basin from the east and northeast. Small outliers occur near Taynuilt and either side of Loch Avich. The deposits are especially obvious on Kerrera where they form the bedrock across half of the island. These are conformably overlain by peperite and the basaltic and andesitic Lorne plateau lavas. The ORS on Kerrera and isolated localities around Oban are known for their fossils, particularly fish.

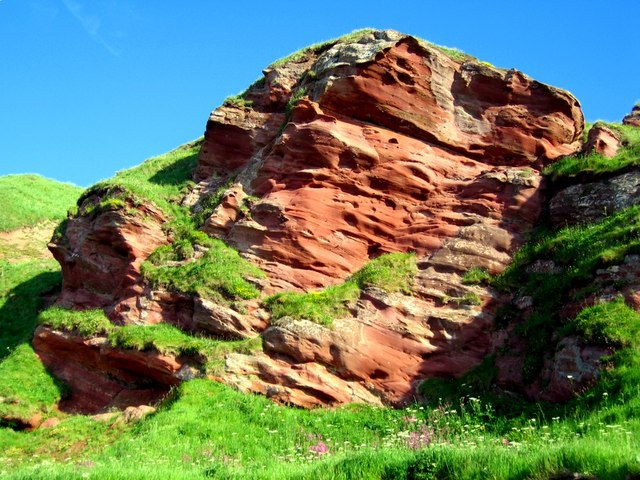
Old Red Sandstone at Gardenstown, Aberdeenshire

=== Midland Valley of Scotland ===
The Midland Valley graben defined by the Highland Boundary Fault in the north and the Southern Uplands Fault in the south harbours not only a considerable amount of Old Red Sandstone sedimentary rocks but also igneous rocks of this age associated with extensive volcanism. There is a continuous outcrop along the Highland Boundary Fault from Stonehaven on the North Sea coast to Helensburgh and beyond to Arran. A more disconnected series of outcrops occur along the line of the Southern Uplands Fault from Edinburgh to Girvan. Old Red Sandstone often occurs in conjunction with conglomerate formations, one such noteworthy cliffside exposure being the Fowlsheugh Nature Reserve, Kincardineshire.

=== Scottish borders ===
A series of outcrops occur from East Lothian southwards through Berwickshire. Hutton's famous unconformity at Siccar Point occurs within this basin – see History of study below.

=== Anglo-Welsh Basin ===
This relatively large basin extends across much of South Wales from southern Pembrokeshire in the west through Carmarthenshire into Powys and Monmouthshire and through the southern Welsh Marches, into Herefordshire, Worcestershire and Gloucestershire. Outliers in Somerset and north Devon complete its extent.

With the exception of south Pembrokeshire, all parts of the basin are represented by a range of lithologies assigned to the Lower Devonian and to the Upper Devonian, the contact between the two being unconformable and representing the complete omission of any Middle Devonian sequence.

==== South Powys/Brecon Beacons ====
The lowermost formations are of upper Silurian age, these being the Downton Castle Sandstone Formation and the overlying Moor Cliffs Formation (formerly the Raglan Mudstone Formation). The top of this formation is marked by a well-developed calcrete, the Chapel Point Limestone. The lowermost Devonian formation is the Freshwater West Formation (formerly the St Maughans Formation), itself overlain by the Senni Formation (formerly the Senni Beds) which is in turn overlain by the Brownstones Formation. In the east, a further calcrete, the Ffynnon Limestone (sometimes pluralised) is developed at the interface between the Freshwater West and Senni formations. The Senni Formation is not recorded further east.

The Upper Devonian sequence is rather thinner and comprises a series of formations which are more laterally restricted. In the Brecon Beacons, the Plateau Beds Formation is unconformably overlain by the Grey Grits Formation though further east these divisions are replaced by the Quartz Conglomerate Group which is itself subdivided into a variety of different formations.

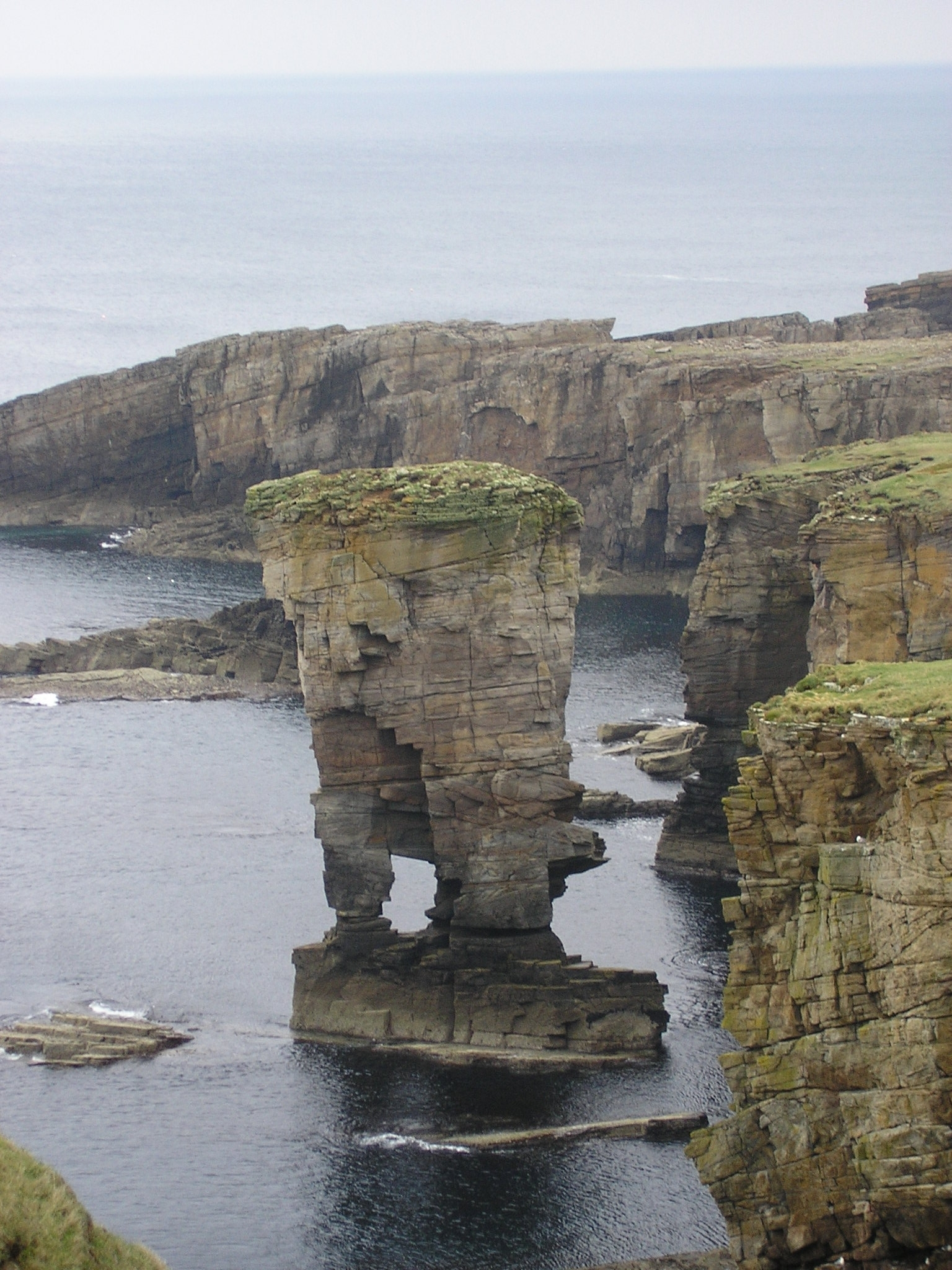
Lower Old Red Sandstone at Yesnaby, Orkney, cross-bedded aeolian sandstone

==== Pembrokeshire ====
The sequence in Pembrokeshire differs from that of the main part of the basin to the east, and falls into two parts.

In North Pembrokeshire to the north of the Ritec Fault, both the middle and upper ORS are missing with only the lower ORS present; this is divided into an earlier Milford Haven Group comprising in ascending order, the Red Cliff, Sandy Haven and Gelliswick Bay formations and a later Cosheston Group with, again in ascending order, its constituent Llanstadwell, Burton Cliff, Mill Bay, Lawrenny Cliff and New Shipping formations. These respectively equate with the Temeside, Raglan Mudstone and St Maughans formations of the central and eastern part of the basin.

- [middle and upper ORS missing]
- Cosheston Group
  - New Shipping Formation
  - Lawrenny Cliff Formation
  - Mill Bay Formation
  - Burton Cliff Formation
  - Llanstadwell Formation
- Milford Haven Group
  - Gelliswick Bay Formation
  - Sandy Haven Formation (including Townsend Tuff Beds)
  - Albion Sands Formation / Lindsway Bay Formation
  - Red Cliff Formation

In south Pembrokeshire to the south of the Ritec Fault, the lower ORS is represented by, in ascending order, the Freshwater East, Moors Cliff and Freshwater West formations. These are unconformably overlain by the Ridgeway Conglomerate Formation. The middle ORS is missing whilst the Upper ORS is represented by the Gupton and West Angle formations.

- Skrinkle Sandstone Group
  - West Angle Formation
  - Gupton Formation
- [Part of middle ORS missing]
- Ridgeway Conglomerate Formation
- [Part of middle ORS missing]
- Milford Haven Group
  - Freshwater West Formation (including Rat Island Mudstone Member and Conigar Pit Sandstone Member)
  - Moor Cliffs Formation (including Chapel Point Limestone Member and Townsend Tuff Bed)
  - Freshwater East Formation

The Freshwater East Formation, and corresponding Red Cliff Formation of north Pembrokeshire, are both late Silurian in age.

=== Anglesey ===
A small and separate basin exists here where both alluvial and lacustrine deposits are recorded. Both the middle and upper ORS are missing but the lower ORS is represented, in ascending order, by the Bodafon, Traeth Bach, Porth y Mor and Traeth Lligwy formations. Calcretes are also recorded representing carbonate-rich soils developed between periods of sediment deposition. The present day outcrop occupies a narrow zone from Dulas Bay on Anglesey's northeast coast, southwards to the town of Llangefni.

== History of study ==
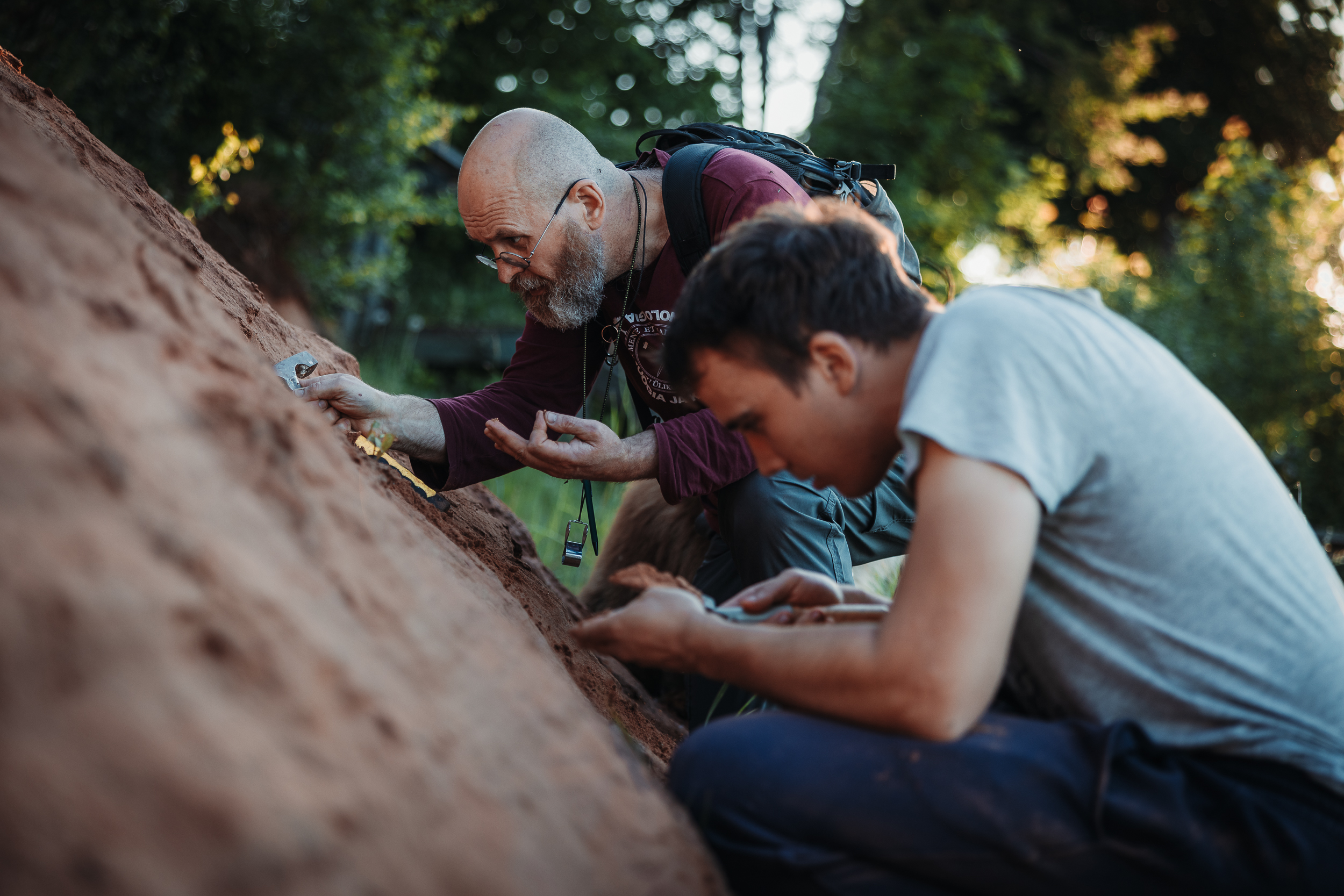
The red Devonian sandstones in Southern Estonia hide fossils of prehistoric fish. They were first investigated already in the 19th century by men like Hermann Martin Asmuss, and that continues through modern day

In 1787 James Hutton noted what is now known as Hutton's Unconformity at Inchbonny, Jedburgh, and in early 1788 he set off with John Playfair to the Berwickshire coast and found more examples of this sequence in the valleys of the Tower and Pease Burns near Cockburnspath. They then took a boat trip from Dunglass Burn east along the coast with the geologist Sir James Hall of Dunglass and at Siccar Point found what Hutton called "a beautiful picture of this junction washed bare by the sea", where 345-million-year-old Old Red Sandstone overlies 425-million-year-old Silurian greywacke.

In the early 19th century, the paleontology of the formation was studied intensively by Hugh Miller, Henry Thomas De la Beche, Roderick Murchison, and Adam Sedgwick—Sedgwick's interpretation was the one that placed it in the Devonian: he coined the name of that period. The term 'Old Red Sandstone' was originally used in 1821 by Scottish naturalist and mineralogist Robert Jameson to refer to the red rocks which underlay the 'Mountain Limestone' i.e. the Carboniferous Limestone. They were thought at that time to be the British version of Germany's Rotliegendes, which is in fact of Permian age. Many of the science of stratigraphy's early debates were about the Old Red Sandstone.

In older geological works predating theories of plate tectonics, the United States' Catskill Delta formation is sometimes referred to as part of the Old Red Sandstone. In the modern day it is recognized that the two are not stratigraphically continuous but are very similar due to being formed at approximately the same time by the same processes.

== Use as a building stone ==
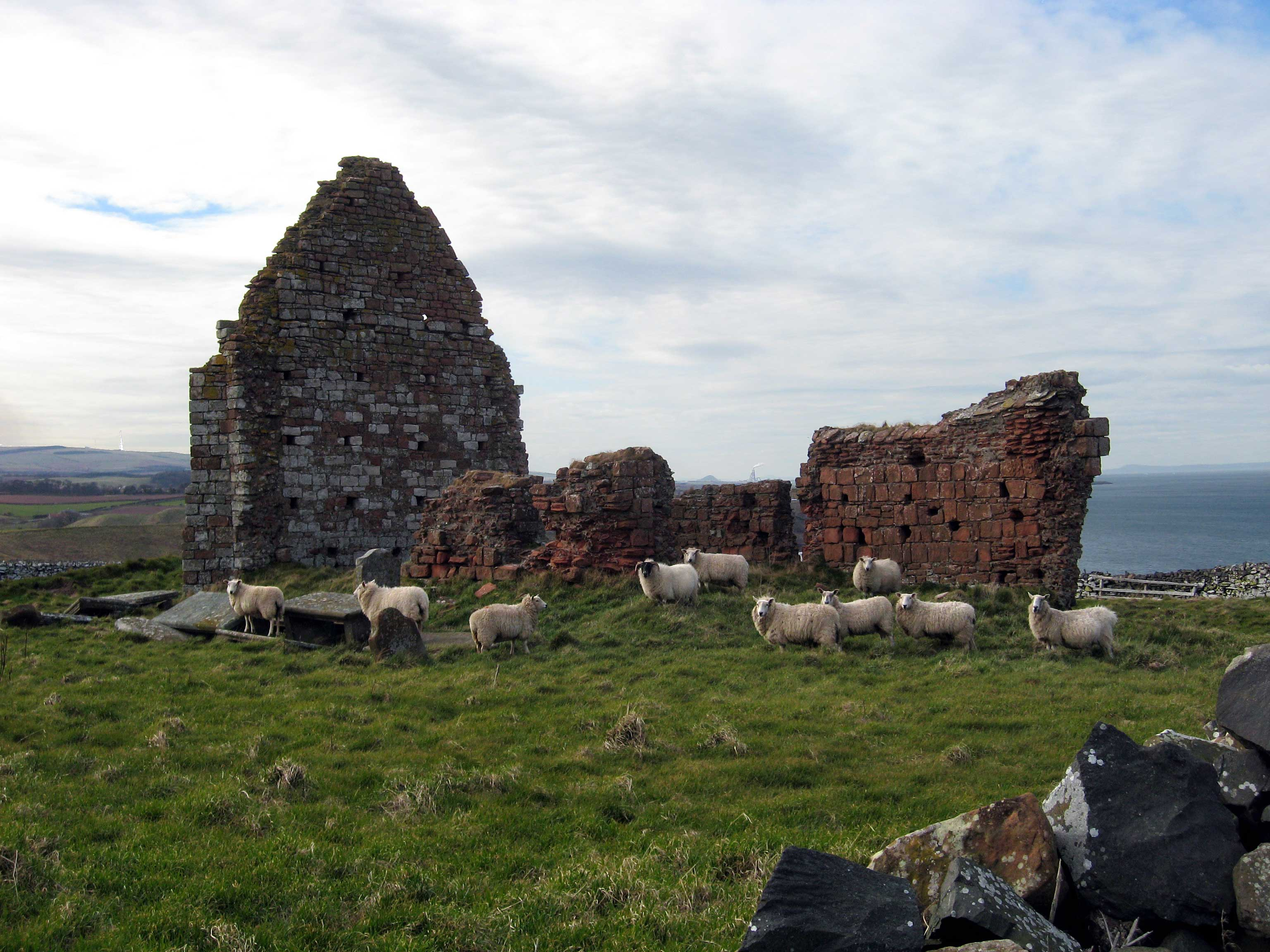
St. Helen's Chapel at Siccar Point has walls faced in Old Red Sandstone, with greywacke used on the inner face and surrounding drystane dykes.

The Old Red Sandstone has been widely used as a building stone across those regions where it outcrops. Notable examples of its use can be found in the area surrounding Stirling, Stonehaven, Perth and Tayside. The inhabitants of Caithness at the northeastern tip of Scotland also used the stone to a considerable extent. Old Red Sandstone has also frequently been used in buildings in Herefordshire, Monmouthshire and the former Brecknockshire (now south Powys) of south Wales.

=== Notable buildings ===
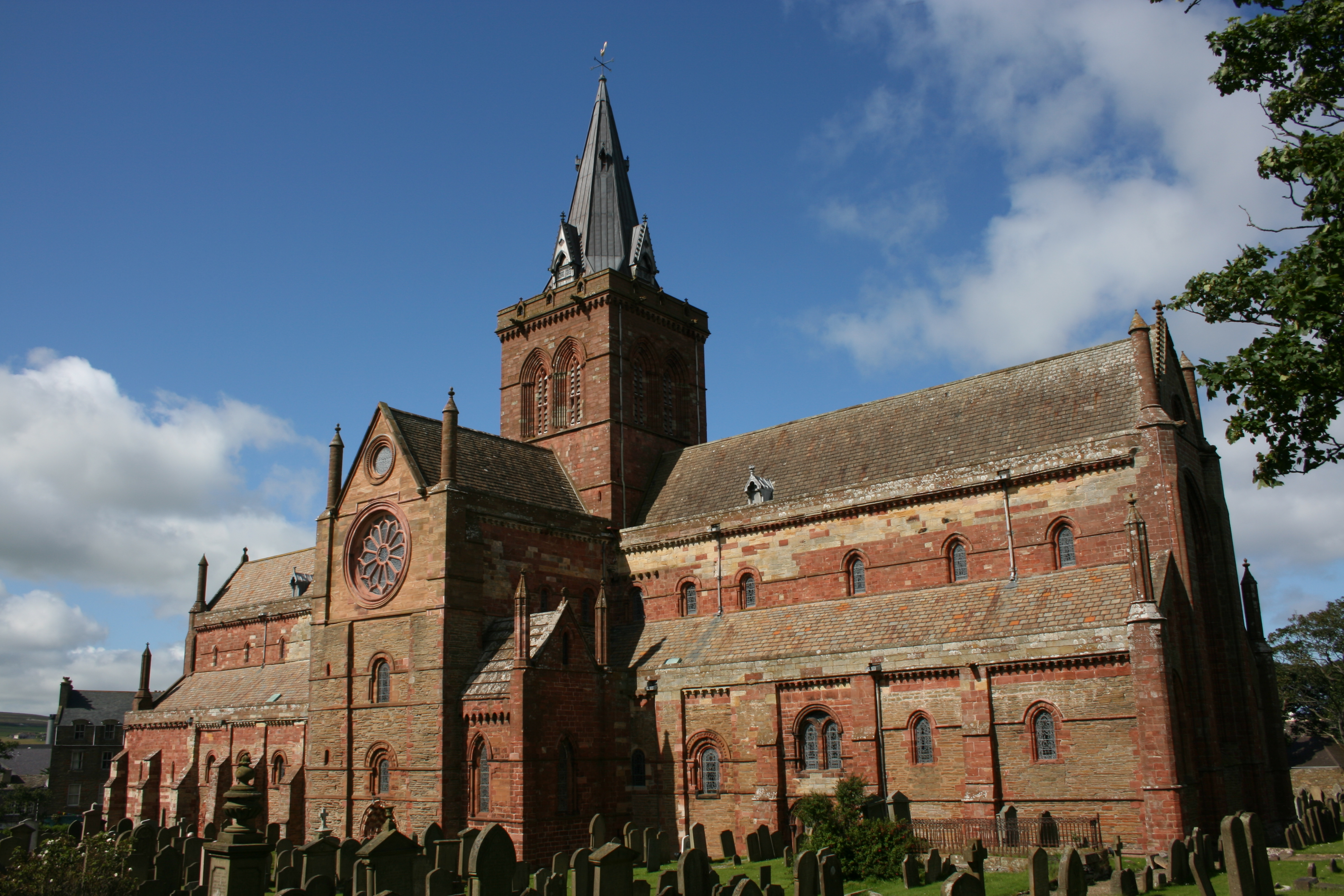
St Magnus Cathedral in Kirkwall, Orkney, constructed of locally quarried sandstone

==== Canada ====
- New York Life Insurance Building, Montreal

==== England ====
- Goodrich Castle, Herefordshire
- Ross-on-Wye market hall, Herefordshire
- Shrewsbury Castle, Shropshire
- Hereford Cathedral, Herefordshire
- St. Mary Magdalene church, Taunton, Somerset

==== Scotland ====
- Arbroath Abbey, Angus
- Balvaird Castle, Perthshire
- Muchalls Castle, Aberdeenshire
- St Magnus Cathedral, Orkney
- Stonehaven Tolbooth, Aberdeenshire

==== Wales ====
- Raglan Castle, Monmouthshire
- Tintern Abbey, Monmouthshire
- Brecon Cathedral, Powys

== See also ==
- New Red Sandstone
- Geology of Great Britain
