= Gray Sandstone Group =

Geological group in west Wales

- Stratigraphic range: Wenlockian (Silurian)
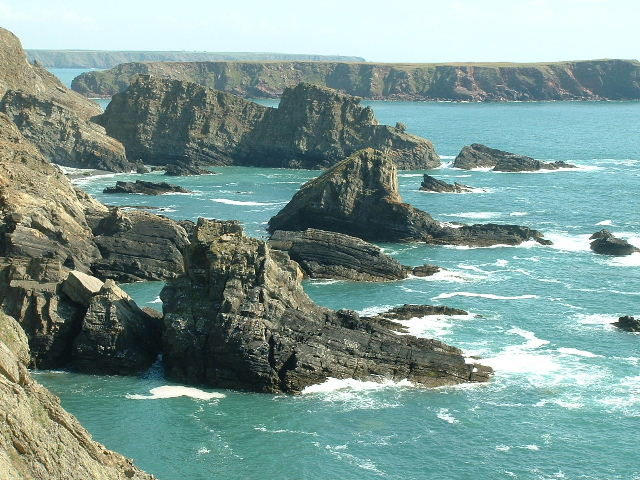
- Thick sandstone units of the Gray Sandstone Group outcropping on the coast, just west of Marloes Sands
- Type: Group
- Underlies: Red Marls Formation
- Overlies: Coralliferous Group
- Thickness: circa 274 - 609m

Lithology
- Primary: quartzitic sandstones
- Other: mudstones

Location
- Country: Wales
- Extent: south Pembrokeshire

The Gray Sandstone Group is a late Silurian lithostratigraphic group (a sequence of rock strata) in west Wales. The strata are exposed in the coast around the Milford Haven area; outcrops occur either side of Marloes Bay. Besides quartzitic sandstones and mudstones, sandy rottenstones are found at outcrop. Fossils within the rottenstone beds include brachiopods and corals. The rocks of this group have also previously been known as the Gray Sandstone Series.
