= Compression (geology) =

Geology term for a set of stress directed toward the center of a rock mass

In geology, the term compression refers to a set of stresses directed toward the center of a rock mass. Compressive strength refers to the maximum amount of compressive stress that can be applied to a material before failure occurs. When the maximum compressive stress is in a horizontal orientation, thrust faulting can occur, resulting in the shortening and thickening of that portion of the crust. When the maximum compressive stress is vertical, a section of rock will often fail in normal faults, horizontally extending and vertically thinning a given layer of rock. Compressive stresses can also result in the folding of rocks. Because of the large magnitudes of lithostatic stress in tectonic plates, tectonic-scale deformation is always subjected to net compressive stress.

Compressive stresses can result in a number of different features at varying scales, most notably including Folds, and Thrust faults.

== See also ==
- Gravitational compression
