= 12999 Toruń =

Baptistina asteroid

Discovery
- Discovered by: E. Bowell
- Discovery site: Anderson Mesa Stn.
- Discovery date: 30 August 1981

Designations
- Named after: Toruń (Polish city)
- Alternative designations: 1981 QJ_{2} · 1957 TF; 1998 QL_{8}
- Minor planet category: main-belt · Baptistina

Orbital characteristics
- Epoch 4 September 2017 (JD 2458000.5)
- Uncertainty parameter 0
- Observation arc: 59.49 yr (21,730 days)
- Aphelion: 2.7036 AU
- Perihelion: 1.8438 AU
- Semi-major axis: 2.2737 AU
- Eccentricity: 0.1891
- Orbital period (sidereal): 3.43 yr (1,252 days)
- Mean anomaly: 168.46°
- Mean motion: 0° 17^{m} 15^{s} / day
- Inclination: 5.7705°
- Longitude of ascending node: 152.34°
- Argument of perihelion: 210.91°

Physical characteristics
- Dimensions: 3.523±0.136 km 7.96 km (calculated)
- Synodic rotation period: 3.5521±0.0026 h
- Geometric albedo: 0.057 (assumed); 0.392±0.028
- Spectral type: C
- Absolute magnitude (H): 13.773±0.002 (R) · 13.8 · 13.9 · 14.22

12999 Toruń, provisional designation 1981 QJ_{2}, is a carbonaceous Baptistina asteroid from the inner regions of the asteroid belt, approximately 8 kilometers in diameter. It was discovered on 30 August 1981, by British–American astronomer Edward Bowell at Lowell Observatory's Anderson Mesa Station in Flagstaff, Arizona, and named after the Polish city of Toruń.

== Orbit and classification ==
Toruń is a carbonaceous C-type asteroid and a member of the small Baptistina family. It orbits the Sun in the inner main-belt at a distance of 1.8–2.7 AU once every 3 years and 5 months (1,252 days). Its orbit has an eccentricity of 0.19 and an inclination of 6° with respect to the ecliptic. The first precovery was taken at Goethe Link Observatory in 1957, extending the asteroid's observation arc by 24 years prior to its discovery.

== Physical characteristics ==
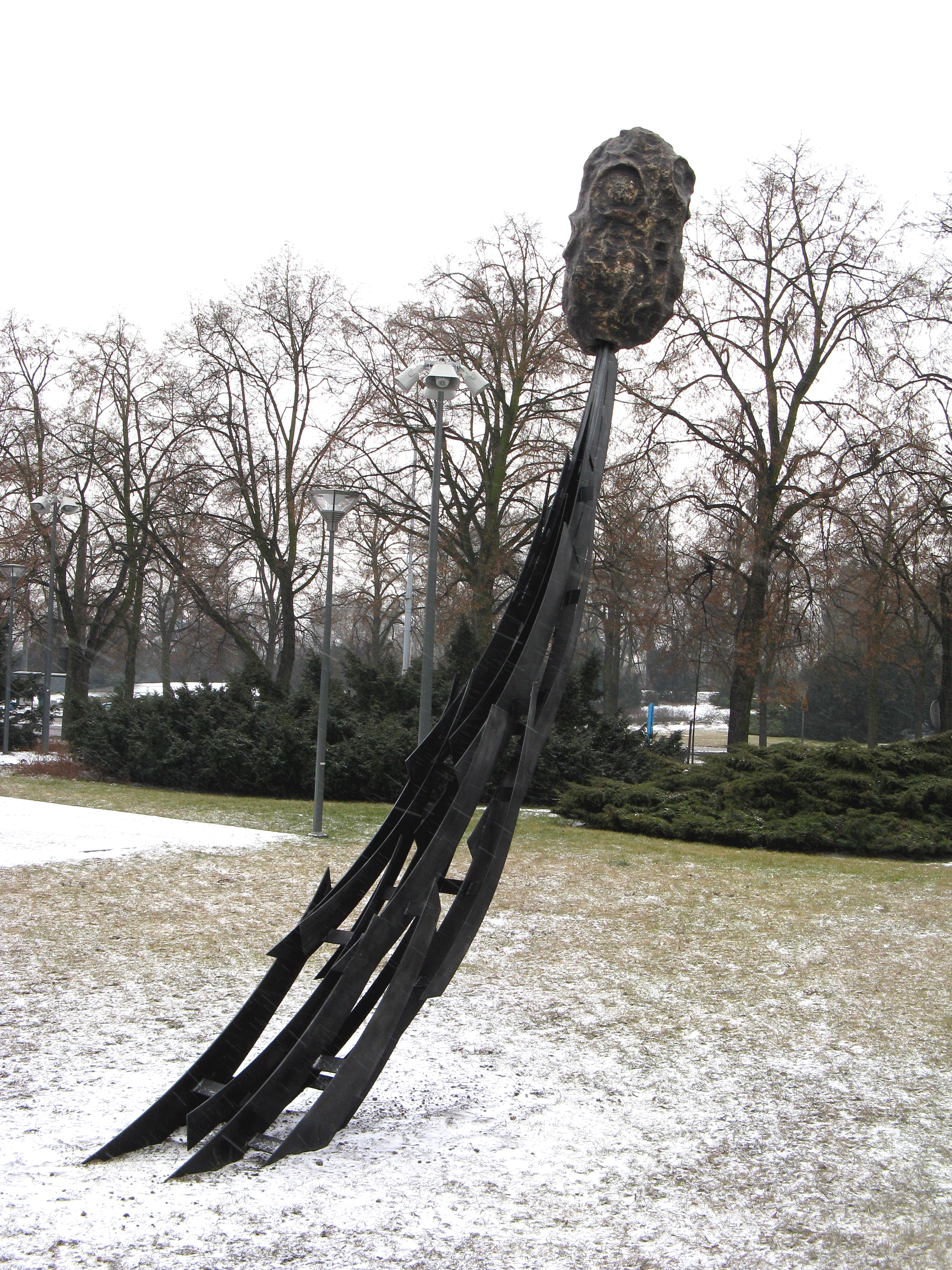
Monument of this asteroid in Toruń, Poland

=== Rotation period ===
A rotational lightcurve of Toruń was obtained from photometric observations at the U.S. Palomar Transient Factory in December 2009. The provisional lightcurve gave a rotation period of 3.5521±0.0026 hours with a brightness amplitude of 0.09 in magnitude (U=1).

=== Diameter and albedo ===
According to the survey carried out by the NEOWISE mission of NASA's Wide-field Infrared Survey Explorer, Toruń measures 3.5 kilometers in diameter and its surface has a very high albedo of 0.39. The Collaborative Asteroid Lightcurve Link (CALL) disagrees with the findings by the space-based mission and assumes a standard albedo for carbonaceous asteroids of 0.057, with a correspondingly larger diameter of 8.0 kilometers with an absolute magnitude of 14.22. As with 1696 Nurmela, another member of the Baptistina family, CALL assumes this asteroid's composition (also see carbonaceous chondrites) to differ significantly from the much brighter asteroid 298 Baptistina, which is considered to be an interloper in its own family.

== Naming ==
In 2008, this minor planet was named after the city of Toruń, Poland. It is the birthplace of Nicolaus Copernicus, significant to Polish and European history, a UNESCO World Heritage listed Old Town, and the main site of the Nicolaus Copernicus University, where its observatory at Piwnice, the largest in Poland, is located. The naming followed a suggestion by Polish astronomer T. Michałowski. The approved naming citation was published by the Minor Planet Center 21 March 2008 (M.P.C. 62354).
