= Iridium anomaly =

Thin layer of the element iridium in rock strata at the Cretaceous–Paleogene boundary

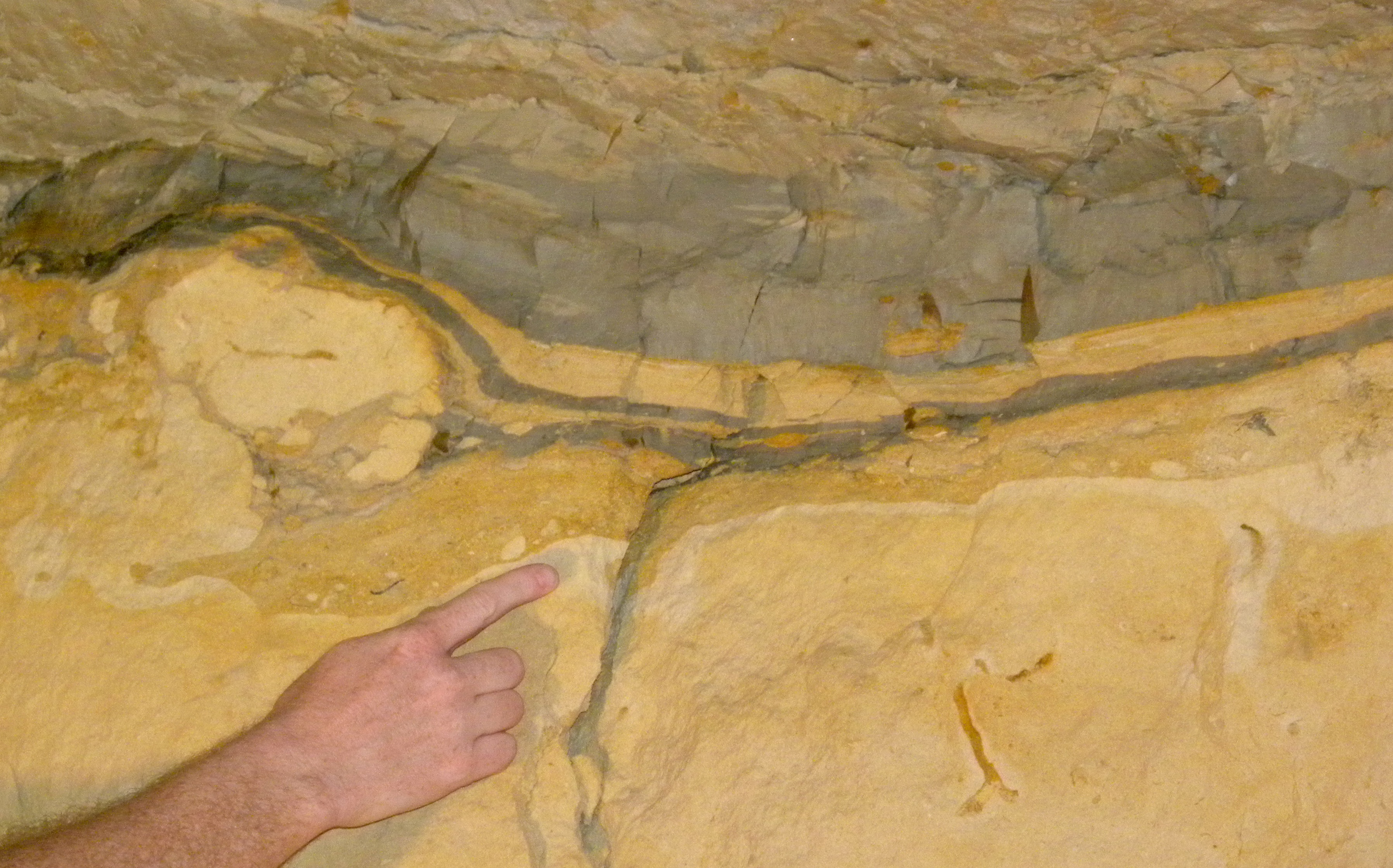
Cretaceous-Paleogene clay in the Geulhemmergroeve tunnels near Geulhem, The Netherlands

The term iridium anomaly commonly refers to an unusual abundance of the chemical element iridium in a layer of rock strata at the Cretaceous–Paleogene (K–Pg) boundary. The unusually high concentration of a rare metal like iridium is often taken as evidence for an extraterrestrial impact event.

== Anomaly characteristics ==
The type locality of this iridium anomaly is near Raton, New Mexico.

Iridium is a very rare element in the Earth's crust, but is found in anomalously high concentrations (around 100 times greater than normal) in a thin worldwide layer of clay marking the boundary between the Cretaceous and Paleogene periods, 66 million years ago. This boundary is marked by a major extinction event, including that of the dinosaurs along with about 70% of all other species. The clay layer also contains small grains of shocked quartz and, in some places, small weathered glass beads thought to be tektites.

== Meteorite impact theory ==
A team consisting of the physicist Luis Alvarez, his son, geologist Walter Alvarez, and chemists Frank Asaro and Helen Vaughn Michel were the first to link the extinction to an extraterrestrial impact event based on the observation that iridium is much more abundant in meteorites than it is on Earth. This theory was later substantiated by other evidence, including the eventual discovery of the impact crater, known as Chicxulub, on the Yucatán Peninsula in Mexico.

== See also ==
- Alvarez hypothesis
- Eltanin impact
