= Glen Penfield =

American geophysicist

- Education: Oberlin College
- Known for: Co-discovering the Chicxulub crater
- Scientific career
- Fields: Geophysics

Glen Penfield is a geophysicist best known for his role in the discovery of the Chicxulub crater, a massive impact structure located on the Yucatán Peninsula in Mexico. This crater is widely accepted as the impact site of the asteroid that contributed to the Cretaceous–Paleogene (K–Pg) extinction event approximately 66 million years ago, which led to the mass extinction of non-avian dinosaurs and many other species.

== Early life ==
Glen Penfield received his education in geophysics at Oberlin College and began his career in the petroleum industry as a geophysicist thereafter. Immediately after graduating in July 1975, he joined the Aero Service Division of Litton's Western Atlas International in Houston.

== Career ==
=== Discovery of the Chicxulub crater ===
In the late 1970s, Penfield was working as a geophysicist for the Mexican oil company Petróleos Mexicanos (PEMEX) when he was assigned to conduct magnetic and gravitational surveys of the Yucatán Peninsula as part of oil exploration efforts. During these surveys conducted between 1978 and 1981, Penfield identified a large, roughly circular geophysical anomaly centered near the town of Chicxulub Pueblo on the northern coast of the Yucatán Peninsula.

The gravitational and magnetic data collected by Penfield revealed a buried structure approximately 180 km in diameter with the characteristics of an impact crater, including a central uplift and a surrounding ring. However, due to PEMEX's proprietary restrictions on data, Penfield was initially limited in his ability to share and publish his findings. In 1981, Penfield and Antonio Camargo, a PEMEX geologist, presented their findings at the Society of Exploration Geophysicists conference. They proposed that the circular structure could be an impact crater but received little attention from the scientific community at the time.

=== Collaboration with Luis and Walter Alvarez ===
Around the same time as Penfield's discovery, the father-son team of Luis and Walter Alvarez, along with Frank Asaro and Helen Michel, had published their hypothesis that a large asteroid impact had caused the K–Pg extinction event. Their evidence included an anomalously high concentration of iridium (an element rare on Earth but more common in asteroids) found in the K–Pg boundary layer worldwide. It wasn't until the early 1990s that the connection was made between Penfield's crater and the Alvarez hypothesis. When Penfield's data was finally able to be more widely shared, scientists recognized that the Chicxulub structure matched the size and age requirements for the impact crater hypothesized by the Alvarez team.

Further research confirmed that the Chicxulub crater dated to approximately 66 million years ago, coinciding with the K-Pg boundary. The crater's size indicated an impactor of about 10–15 km in diameter, capable of causing global catastrophic effects consistent with the mass extinction event. The Chicxulub impact is now widely accepted as a primary contributor to the extinction of approximately 75% of plant and animal species on Earth at that time, including all non-avian dinosaurs.

=== Later career ===
Penfield spent five decades working in hydrocarbon and mineral exploration, as well as for service companies, like PEMEX, ConocoPhillips, South Atlantic Petroleum, Western Atlas International, Carson Aerogravity, Fusion Petroleum Technologies, and his own consultancy, Chicxulub Geosciences.
