= William F. Bottke =

American planetary scientist

- Born: 1966 (age 59–60)
- Citizenship: US
- Education: University of Minnesota, University of Arizona
- Occupation: Planetary science
- Organization: Southwest Research Institute

William F. "Bill" Bottke (born 1966) is a planetary scientist specializing in asteroids. He works at the Southwest Research Institute in Boulder, Colorado.

== Education ==
Bottke received his undergraduate degrees, in physics and astrophysics, at the University of Minnesota in 1988. In 1995, he received his PhD in planetary science from the University of Arizona for research on asteroid dynamics.

== Research interests ==
Bottke's research focuses on modeling various properties in asteroid dynamics. He has published extensively on the importance of tidal disruption and the Yarkovsky and YORP effects on the physical structure and orbits of asteroids, and the early solar system, particularly the Late Heavy Bombardment.

=== Cretaceous–Paleogene (Cretaceous–Tertiary) impactor ===
In 2007, Bottke published a paper in Nature (with David Vokrouhlický and David Nesvorný), proposing that the asteroid that produced the Chicxulub Crater and caused the Cretaceous mass extinction (although the latter is still contended) formed during an asteroid breakup in the main asteroid belt approximately 160 million years ago. Bottke and his collaborators base this on a model for the evolution of the Baptistina asteroid family, in which fragments from the collision that formed the family migrate throughout the inner solar system. They date the event based on the current orbits of Baptistina family members, and then compute the orbital evolution of smaller (few-km) objects produced in the collision, and conclude that the Chicxulub impact or was one such object. They also propose that Tycho crater on the Moon was created by an object produced in the same collision.

However, subsequent evidence has disproven this theory. A 2009 spectrographic analysis revealed that 298 Baptistina has a different composition more typical of an S-type asteroid than the presumed carbonaceous chondrite composition of the Chicxulub impactor.
