= Chicxulub crater =

Prehistoric impact crater in Mexico

- Chicxulub impact structure
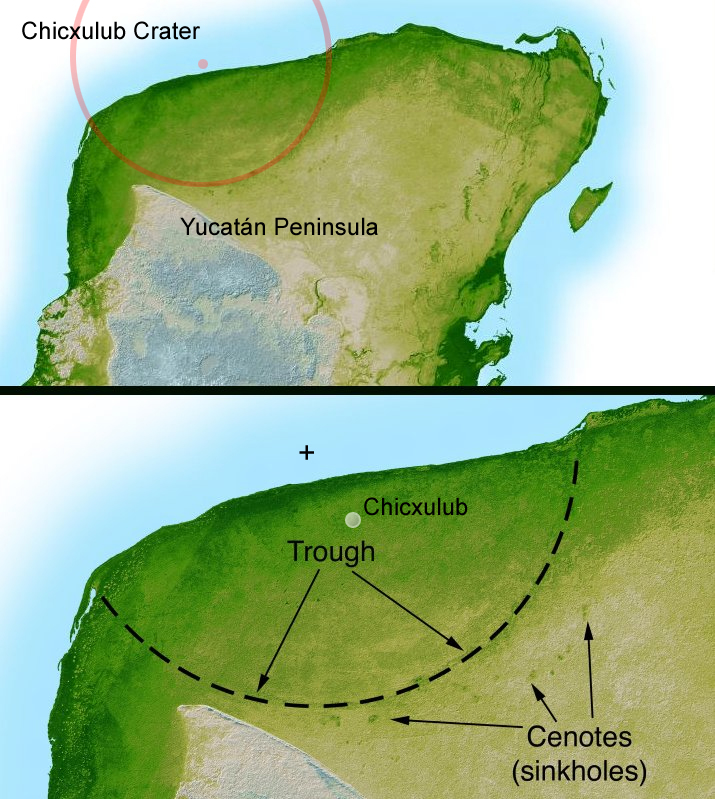
- Imaging from NASA's Shuttle Radar Topography Mission STS-99 reveals part of the diameter ring of the crater in the form of a shallow circular trough. Numerous cenotes (sinkholes) cluster around the trough marking the inner crater rim.

- Location within North America Location within Mexico Location within Gulf of Mexico Location within Yucatán (state)
- Location: Yucatán, Mexico; 21°24′N 89°30′W

Impact crater structure
- Confidence: Confirmed
- Diameter: ~180–200 km (110–120 mi)
- Depth: ~1 km (0.6 mi) burial depth
- Impactor diameter: ~10 km (6 mi)
- Age: 66.043 ± 0.043 Ma Cretaceous–Paleogene boundary
- Exposed: No
- Drilled: Yes
- Bolide type: Carbonaceous chondrite
- Pronunciation: [/tʃiːkʃuːˈluːb/ cheek-shoo-LOOB; Spanish: [tʃikʃuˈlub] ]

The Chicxulub crater is an impact crater buried underneath the Yucatán Peninsula in Mexico. The crater is named after the onshore inland community of Chicxulub Pueblo. It was formed slightly over 66 million years ago when an asteroid, about ten kilometers (six miles) in diameter, struck Earth. The crater is estimated to be two hundred kilometers (120 mi) in diameter and is buried to a depth of about one kilometer (0.6 mi) beneath younger sedimentary rocks. It is one of the largest impact structures on Earth, alongside the much older Sudbury and Vredefort impact structures, and the only one whose peak ring is intact and directly accessible for scientific research.

The crater was discovered by Antonio Camargo and Glen Penfield, geophysicists who had been looking for petroleum in the Yucatán Peninsula during the late 1970s. Penfield was initially unable to obtain evidence that the geological feature was a crater and gave up his search. Later, through contact with Alan R. Hildebrand in 1990, Penfield obtained samples that suggested it was an impact feature. Evidence for the crater's impact origin includes shocked quartz, a gravity anomaly, and tektites in surrounding areas.

The date of the impact coincides with the Cretaceous–Paleogene boundary (commonly known as the K–Pg or K–T boundary). It is now widely accepted that the devastation and climate disruption resulting from the impact was the primary cause of the Cretaceous–Paleogene extinction event, a mass extinction of 75% of plant and animal species on Earth, including all non-avian dinosaurs.

== Discovery ==
In the late 1970s, geologist Walter Alvarez and his father, Nobel Prize–winning scientist Luis Walter Alvarez, put forth their theory that the Cretaceous–Paleogene extinction was caused by an impact event. The main evidence of such an impact was contained in a thin layer of clay present in the Cretaceous–Paleogene boundary (K–Pg boundary) in Gubbio, Italy. The Alvarezes and colleagues reported that it contained an abnormally high concentration of iridium, a chemical element rare on Earth but common in asteroids. Iridium levels in this layer were as much as 160 times above the background level. It was hypothesized that the iridium was spread into the atmosphere when the impactor was vaporized and settled across Earth's surface among other material thrown up by the impact, producing the layer of iridium-enriched clay. At the time, there was no consensus on what caused the Cretaceous–Paleogene extinction and the boundary layer, with theories including a nearby supernova, climate change, or a geomagnetic reversal. The Alvarezes' impact hypothesis was rejected by many paleontologists, who believed that the lack of fossils found close to the K–Pg boundary—the "three-meter problem"—suggested a more gradual die-off of fossil species.

The Alvarezes, joined by Frank Asaro and Helen Michel from University of California, Berkeley, published their paper on the iridium anomaly in Science in June 1980. Almost simultaneously Jan Smit and Jan Hertogen published their iridium findings from Caravaca, Spain, in Nature in May 1980. These papers were followed by other reports of similar iridium spikes at the K–Pg boundary across the globe, and sparked wide interest in the cause of the K–Pg extinction; over 2,000 papers were published in the 1980s on the topic. There were no known impact craters that were the right age and size, spurring a search for a suitable candidate. Recognizing the scope of the work, Lee Hunt and Lee Silver organized a cross-discipline meeting in Snowbird, Utah, in 1981. Unknown to them, evidence of the crater they were looking for was being presented the same week, and would be largely missed by the scientific community.

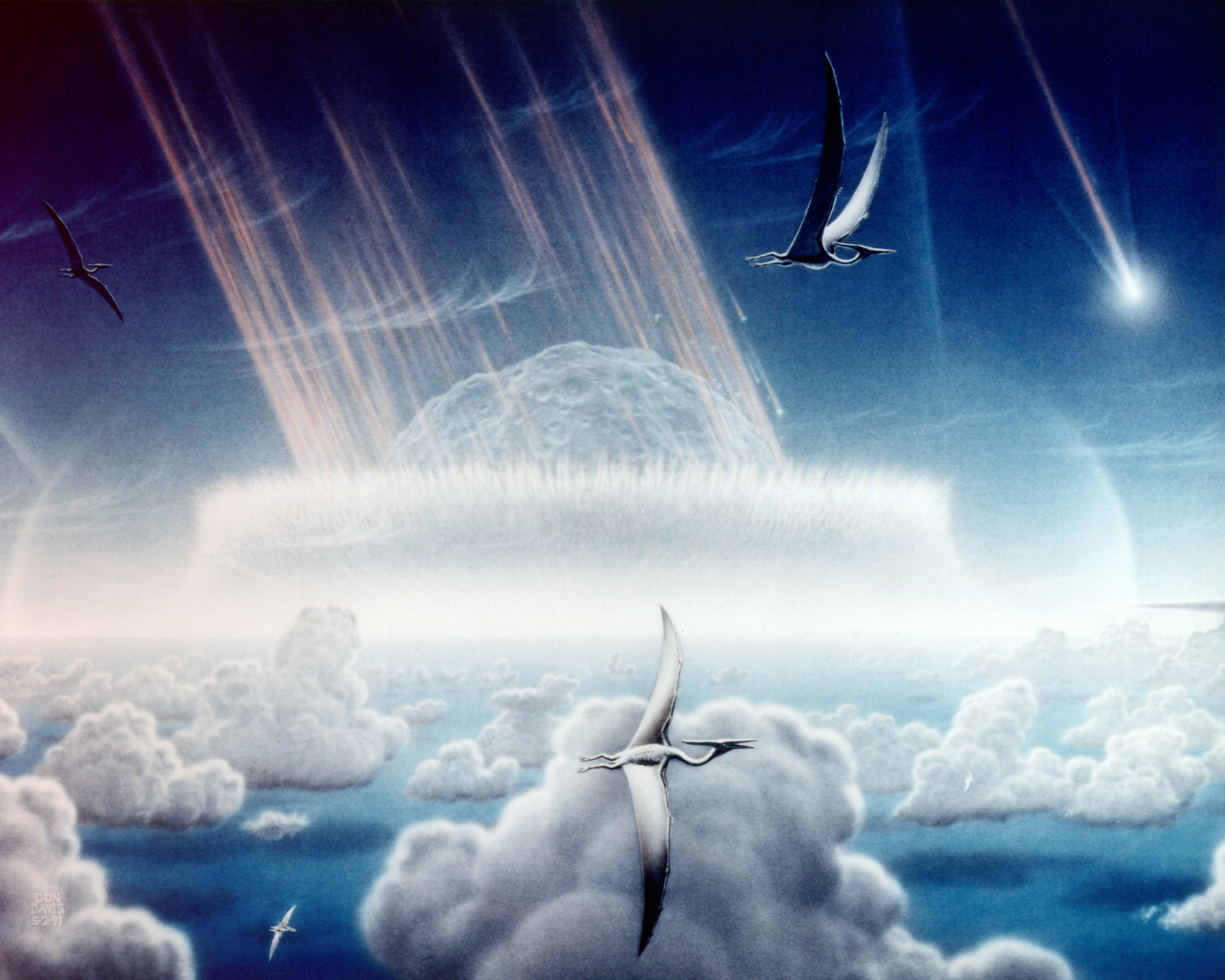
Artist's impression of the asteroid slamming into tropical, shallow seas of the sulfur-rich Yucatán Peninsula in what is today Southeast Mexico. The aftermath of the asteroid collision, which occurred approximately 66 million years ago, is believed to have caused the mass extinction of non-avian dinosaurs and many other species on Earth. The impact spewed hundreds of billions of tons of sulfur into the atmosphere, producing a worldwide blackout and freezing temperatures which persisted for at least a decade.

In 1978, geophysicists Glen Penfield and Antonio Camargo were working for the Mexican state-owned oil company Petróleos Mexicanos (Pemex) as part of an airborne magnetic survey of the Gulf of Mexico north of the Yucatán Peninsula. Penfield's job was to use geophysical data to scout possible locations for oil drilling. In the offshore magnetic data, Penfield noted anomalies whose depth he estimated and mapped. He then obtained onshore gravity data from the 1940s. When the gravity maps and magnetic anomalies were compared, Penfield described a shallow "bullseye", 180 km (110 mi) in diameter, appearing on the otherwise non-magnetic and uniform surroundings—clear evidence to him of an impact feature. A decade earlier, the same map had suggested a crater to contractor Robert Baltosser, but Pemex corporate policy prevented him from publicizing his conclusion.

Penfield presented his findings to Pemex, who rejected the crater theory, instead deferring to findings that ascribed the feature to volcanic activity. Pemex disallowed release of specific data, but let Penfield and Camargo present the results at the 1981 Society of Exploration Geophysicists conference. That year's conference was under-attended and their report attracted little attention, as many experts on impact craters and the K–Pg boundary were attending the Snowbird conference instead. Carlos Byars, a Houston Chronicle journalist who was familiar with Penfield and had seen the gravitational and magnetic data himself, wrote a front-page story on Penfield and Camargo's claim, but the news did not propagate widely.

Although Penfield had plenty of geophysical data sets, he had no rock cores or other physical evidence of an impact. He knew Pemex had drilled exploratory wells in the region. In 1951, one well bored into what was described as a thick layer of andesite about 1.3 kilometers (4,300 ft) down. This layer could have resulted from the intense heat and pressure of an Earth impact, but at the time of the borings it was dismissed as a lava dome—a feature uncharacteristic of the region's geology. Penfield was encouraged by William C. Phinney, curator of lunar rocks at the Johnson Space Center, to find these samples to support his hypothesis. Penfield tried to secure site samples, but was told they had been lost or destroyed. When attempts to return to the drill sites to look for corroborating rocks proved fruitless, Penfield abandoned his search, published his findings and returned to his Pemex work. Seeing the 1980 Science paper, Penfield wrote to Walter Alvarez about the Yucatán structure, but received no response.

Alvarez and other scientists continued their search for the crater, although they were searching in oceans based on incorrect analysis of glassy spherules from the K–Pg boundary that suggested the impactor had landed in open water. Unaware of Penfield's discovery, University of Arizona graduate student Alan R. Hildebrand and faculty adviser William V. Boynton looked for a crater near the Brazos River in Texas. Their evidence included greenish-brown clay with surplus iridium, containing shocked quartz grains and small weathered glass beads that looked to be tektites. Thick, jumbled deposits of coarse rock fragments were also present, thought to have been scoured from one place and deposited elsewhere by an impact event. Such deposits occur in many locations but seemed concentrated in the Caribbean Basin at the K–Pg boundary. When Haitian professor Florentine Morás discovered what he thought to be evidence of an ancient volcano on Haiti, Hildebrand suggested it could be a telltale feature of a nearby impact. Tests on samples retrieved from the K–Pg boundary revealed more tektite glass, formed only in the heat of asteroid impacts and high-yield nuclear detonations.

In 1990, Carlos Byars told Hildebrand of Penfield's earlier discovery of a possible impact crater. Hildebrand contacted Penfield and the pair soon secured two drill samples from the Pemex wells, which had been stored in New Orleans for decades. Hildebrand's team tested the samples, which clearly showed shock-metamorphic materials. A team of California researchers surveying satellite images found a cenote (sinkhole) ring centered on the town of Chicxulub Pueblo that matched the one Penfield saw earlier; the cenotes were thought to be caused by subsidence of bolide-weakened lithostratigraphy around the impact crater wall. More recent evidence suggests the crater is 300 km (190 mi) wide, and the 180 km (110 mi) ring observed is an inner wall of the larger crater. Hildebrand, Penfield, Boynton, Camargo, and others published their paper identifying the crater in 1991. The crater was named for the nearby town of Chicxulub Pueblo. Penfield also recalled that part of the motivation for the name was "to give the academics and NASA naysayers a challenging time pronouncing it" after years of dismissing its existence.

In March 2010, forty-one experts from many countries reviewed the available evidence: twenty years' worth of data spanning a variety of fields. They concluded that the impact at Chicxulub triggered the mass extinctions at the K–Pg boundary. Dissenters, notably Gerta Keller of Princeton University, have proposed an alternate culprit: the eruption of the Deccan Traps in what is now the Indian subcontinent. This period of intense volcanism occurred before and after the Chicxulub impact; dissenting studies argue that the worst of the volcanic activity occurred before the impact, and the role of the Deccan Traps was instead shaping the evolution of surviving species post-impact. A 2013 study compared isotopes in impact glass from the Chicxulub impact with isotopes in ash from the K–Pg boundary, concluding that they were dated almost exactly the same, and within experimental error.

== Impact specifics ==
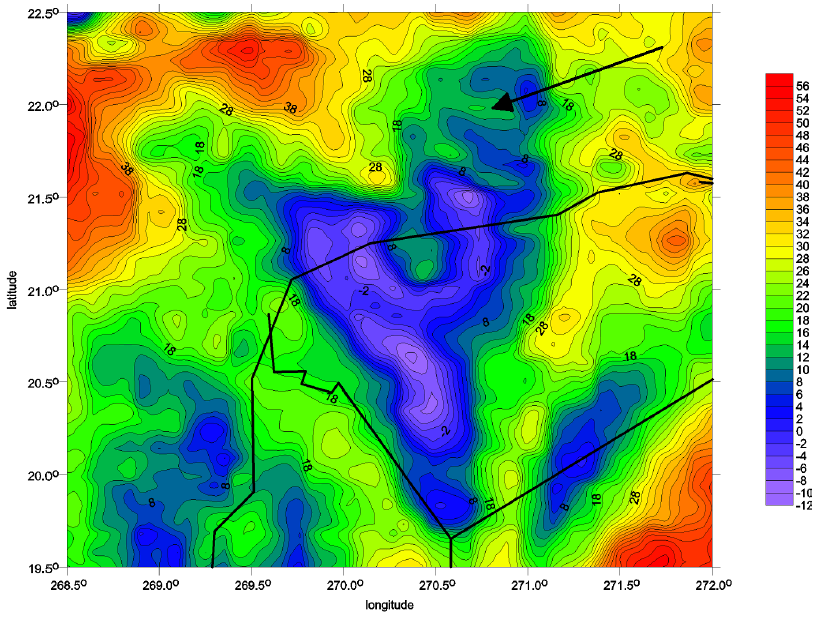
Free-air gravity anomaly over the Chicxulub structure (coastline and state boundaries shown as black lines). The arrow indicates a possible companion crater.

A 2013 study published in Science estimated the age of the impact as 66,043,000 ± 11,000 years ago (± 43,000 years ago considering systematic error), based on multiple lines of evidence, including argon–argon dating of tektites from Haiti and bentonite horizons overlying the impact horizon in northeastern Montana. This date was supported by a 2015 study based on argon–argon dating of tephra found in lignite beds in the Hell Creek and overlying Fort Union formations in northeastern Montana. A 2018 study based on argon–argon dating of spherules from Gorgonilla Island, Colombia, obtained a slightly different result of 66,051,000 ± 31,000 years ago. The impact has been interpreted to have occurred in the Northern Hemisphere's spring season based on annual isotope curves in sturgeon and paddlefish bones found in an ejecta-bearing sedimentary unit at the Tanis site in southwestern North Dakota. This sedimentary unit is thought to have formed within hours of impact.

The site of the crater at the time of impact was a marine carbonate platform. The water depth at the impact site varied from 100 meters (330 ft) on the western edge of the crater to over 1,200 meters (3,900 ft) on the northeastern edge, with an estimated depth at the center of the impact of approximately 650 meters (2,130 ft). The seafloor rocks consisted of a sequence of Jurassic–Cretaceous marine sediments 3 kilometers (1.9 mi) thick. They were predominantly carbonate rock, including dolomite (35–40% of total sequence) and limestone (25–30%), along with evaporites (anhydrite 25–30%) and minor amounts of shale and sandstone (3–4%) underlain by approximately 35 kilometers (22 mi) of continental crust, composed of igneous crystalline basement including granite.

The impactor was around 10 kilometers (6 mi) in diameter—large enough that, if set at sea level, it would have reached taller than Mount Everest. A 2021 study estimated the impactor had a velocity of 20 kilometers per second (12 mi/s) inclined 45–60° to horizontal, impacting from the northeast.

The estimates of released energy in the literature vary from ~10^{23} joules to 10^{24} J and even to 10^{25} J, equivalent to tens of millions to billions of megatons of TNT.

=== Effects ===
An animation showing the Chicxulub impact and subsequent crater formation

Such amounts of energy generated winds in excess of 1,000 kilometers per hour (600 mph) near the blast's center, and produced a transient cavity 100 kilometers (60 mi) wide and 30 kilometers (20 mi) deep that later collapsed. This formed a crater mainly under the sea and currently covered by about 1,000 meters (3,000 ft) of sediment. The impact, expansion of water after filling the crater, and related seismic activity spawned megatsunamis over 100 meters (300 ft) tall, with one simulation suggesting the immediate waves from the impact may have reached up to 1.5 kilometers (0.9 mi) high. The waves scoured the sea floor, leaving ripples underneath what is now Louisiana with average wavelengths of 600 meters (2,000 ft) and average wave heights of 16 meters (52 ft), the largest ripples documented. Material shifted by subsequent earthquakes and the waves reached to what are now Texas and Florida, and may have disturbed sediments as far as 6,000 kilometers (3,700 mi) from the impact site. The impact triggered a seismic event with an estimated moment magnitude of 9 to 11 M_{w}.

A cloud of hot dust, ash and steam would have spread from the crater, with as much as 25 trillion metric tons of excavated material being ejected into the atmosphere by the blast. Some of this material escaped orbit, dispersing throughout the Solar System, while some of it fell back to Earth, vaporizing upon re-entry. The rock heated Earth's surface and ignited wildfires, estimated to have enveloped nearly 70% of the planet's forests. The effect on living creatures even hundreds of kilometers away was immense, and much of present-day Mexico and the United States would have been devastated. Fossil evidence for an instantaneous extinction of diverse animals was found in a soil layer only 10 centimeters (4 in) thick in New Jersey, 2,500 kilometers (1,600 mi) away from the impact site, indicating that death and burial under debris occurred suddenly and quickly over wide distances on nearby land. Field research from the Hell Creek Formation in North Dakota published in 2019 shows the simultaneous mass extinction of myriad species, combined with geological and atmospheric features that are consistent with the impact event.

Due to the relatively shallow water at the impact site, the rock that was vaporized included sulfur-rich gypsum from the lower part of the Cretaceous sequence, and this was injected into the atmosphere. This global dispersal of dust and sulfates would have led to a sudden and catastrophic effect on the climate worldwide, instigating large temperature drops and devastating the food chain. Researchers stated that the impact not only generated an environmental calamity that extinguished life, but it also induced a vast subsurface hydrothermal system that became an oasis for the recovery of life. Using seismic images of the crater in 2008, scientists determined that the impactor landed in deeper water than previously assumed, which may have resulted in increased sulfate aerosols in the atmosphere as a result of more water vapor being available to react with the vaporized anhydrite. This could have made the impact even deadlier by rapidly cooling the climate and generating acid rain.

The emission of dust and particles could have covered the entire surface of Earth for several years, possibly up to a decade, creating a harsh environment for biological life. Production of carbon dioxide caused by the destruction of carbonate rocks would have led to a sudden greenhouse effect. The large oil field present at the impact site may also have combusted, creating a large cloud of soot further blocking sunlight. For a decade or longer, sunlight would have been blocked from reaching the surface of Earth by the dust and soot particles in the atmosphere, cooling the surface dramatically. Photosynthesis by plants would also have been interrupted, affecting the entire food chain. A model of the event developed by Lomax et al. (2001) suggests that net primary productivity rates may have increased to higher than pre-impact levels over the long term because of the high carbon dioxide concentrations.

A long-term local effect of the impact was the creation of the Yucatán sedimentary basin which "ultimately produced favorable conditions for human settlement in a region where surface water is scarce."

== Post-discovery investigations ==
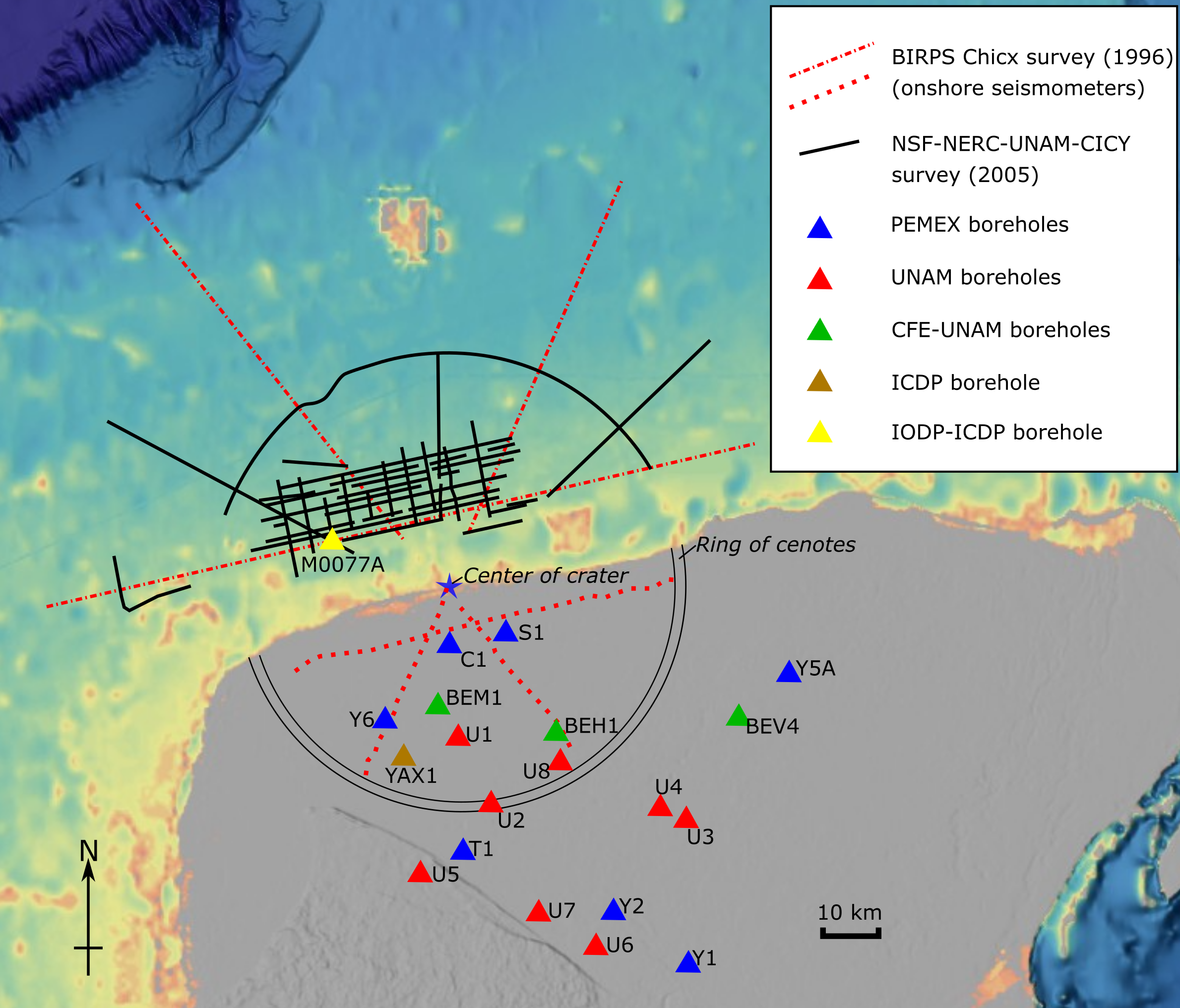
Location of seismic surveys and boreholes

=== Geophysical data ===
Two seismic reflection datasets have been acquired over the offshore parts of the crater since its discovery. Older 2D seismic datasets have also been used that were originally acquired for hydrocarbon exploration. A set of three long-record 2D lines was acquired in October 1996, with a total length of 650 kilometers (400 mi), by the BIRPS group. The longest of the lines, Chicx-A, was shot parallel to the coast, while Chicx-B and Chicx-C were shot NW–SE and SSW–NNE respectively. In addition to the conventional seismic reflection imaging, data was recorded onshore to allow for wide-angle refraction imaging.

In 2005, another set of profiles was acquired, bringing the total length of the 2D deep-penetration seismic data up to 2,470 kilometers (1,530 mi). This survey also used ocean bottom seismometers and land stations to allow 3D travel time inversion to improve the understanding of the velocity structure of the crater. The data was concentrated around the interpreted offshore peak ring to help identify possible drilling locations. At the same time, gravity data was acquired along 7,638 kilometers (4,746 mi) of profiles. The acquisition was funded by the National Science Foundation (NSF), Natural Environment Research Council (NERC) with logistical assistance from the National Autonomous University of Mexico (UNAM) and the Centro de Investigación Científica de Yucatán (CICY – Yucatán Center for Scientific Investigation).

=== Borehole drilling ===
Intermittent core samples from hydrocarbon exploration boreholes drilled by Pemex on the Yucatán peninsula have provided some useful data. UNAM drilled a series of eight fully-cored boreholes in 1995, three of which penetrated deep enough to reach the ejecta deposits outside the main crater rim (UNAM-5, 6, and 7). Between 2001 and 2002, a scientific borehole was drilled near the Hacienda Yaxcopoil, known as Yaxcopoil-1 (or more commonly Yax-1), to a depth of 1,511 meters (4,957 ft) below the surface, as part of the International Continental Scientific Drilling Program. The borehole was cored continuously, passing through 100 meters (330 ft) of impactites. Three fully-cored boreholes were also drilled by the Comisión Federal de Electricidad (Federal Electricity Commission) with UNAM. One of them, (BEV-4), was deep enough to reach the ejecta deposits.

In 2016, a joint United Kingdom–United States team obtained the first offshore core samples from the peak ring in the central zone of the crater with the drilling of the borehole known as M0077A, part of Expedition 364 of the International Ocean Discovery Program. The borehole reached 1,335 meters (4,380 ft) below the seafloor.

== Morphology ==
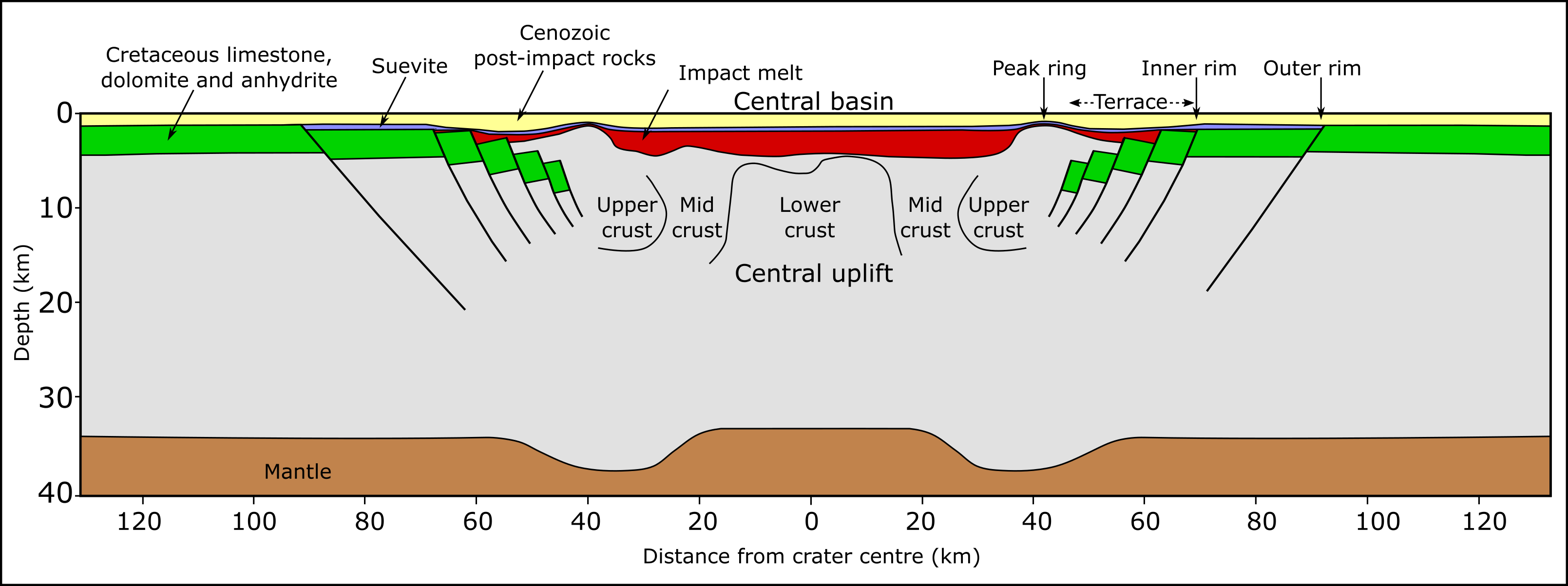
Schematic cross-section of the Chicxulub impact structure

The form and structure (geomorphology) of the Chicxulub crater is known mainly from geophysical data. It has a well-defined concentric multi-ring structure. The outermost ring was identified using seismic reflection data. It is up to 130 kilometers (81 mi) from the crater center, and is a ring of normal faults, throwing down towards the crater center, marking the outer limit of significant crustal deformation. This makes it one of the three largest impact structures on Earth. Moving toward the center, the next ring is the main crater rim, also known as the "inner rim," which correlates with a ring of cenotes onshore and a major circular Bouguer gravity gradient anomaly. This ring has a radius that varies between 70 and 85 kilometers (43 and 53 mi). The next inner ring structure is the peak ring. The area between the inner rim and peak ring is described as the "terrace zone", characterized by a series of fault blocks defined by normal faults dipping towards the crater center, sometimes referred to as "slump blocks". The peak ring is about 80 km in diameter and of variable height, 400 to 600 meters (1,300 to 2,000 ft) above the base of the crater in the west and northwest and 200 to 300 meters (660 to 980 ft) in the north, northeast, and east. The central part of the crater lies above a zone where the mantle was uplifted such that the Mohorovičić discontinuity is shallower by about 1–2 kilometers (0.6–1.2 mi) compared to regional values.

The ring structures are best developed to the south, west and northwest, becoming more indistinct towards the north and northeast of the structure. This is interpreted to be a result of variable water depth at the time of impact, with less-well-defined rings resulting from the areas with water depths significantly deeper than 100 meters (300 ft).

== Geology ==
=== Pre-impact geology ===
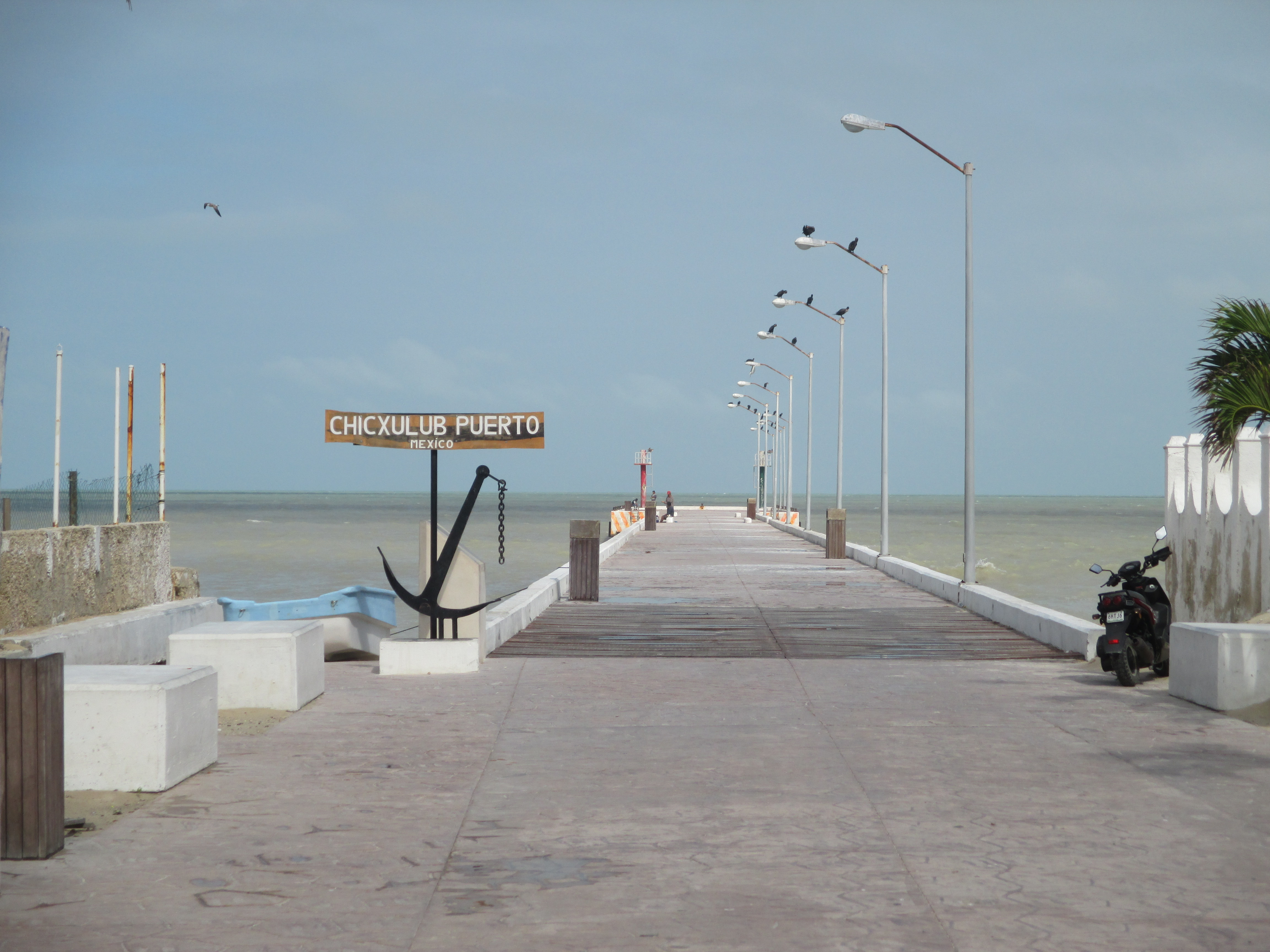
The center of the crater is near Chicxulub Puerto.

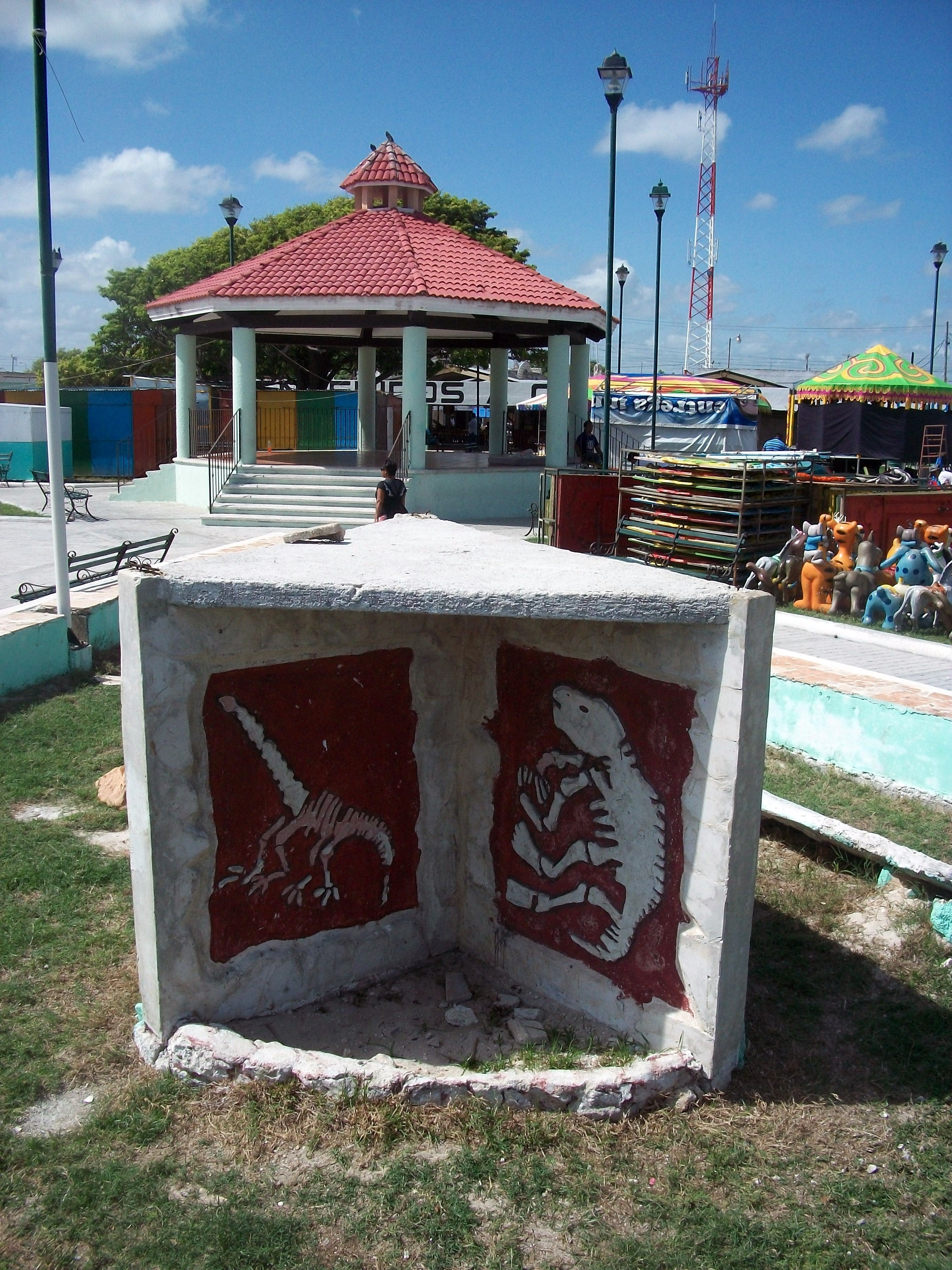
Stela in the main square of Chicxulub Puerto commemorating the impact

Before the impact, the geology of the Yucatán area, sometimes referred to as the "target rocks", consisted of a sequence of mainly Cretaceous limestones, overlying red beds of uncertain age above an unconformity with the dominantly granitic basement. The basement forms part of the Maya Block and information about its makeup and age in the Yucatán area has come only from drilling results around the Chicxulub crater and the analysis of basement material found as part of the ejecta at more distant K–Pg boundary sites. The Maya block is one of a group of crustal blocks found at the edge of the Gondwana continent. Zircon ages are consistent with the presence of an underlying Grenville age crust, with large amounts of late Ediacaran arc-related igneous rocks, interpreted to have formed in the Pan-African orogeny. Late Paleozoic granitoids (the distinctive "pink granite") were found in the peak ring borehole M0077A, with an estimated age of 326 ± 5 million years ago (Carboniferous). These have an adakitic composition and are interpreted to represent the effects of slab detachment during the Marathon-Ouachita orogeny, part of the collision between Laurentia and Gondwana that created the Pangaea supercontinent.

Red beds of variable thickness, up to 115 meters (377 ft), overlay the granitic basement, particularly in the southern part of the area. These continental clastic rocks are thought to be of Triassic-to-Jurassic age, although they may extend into the Lower Cretaceous. The lower part of the Lower Cretaceous sequence consists of dolomite with interbedded anhydrite and gypsum, with the upper part being limestone, with dolomite and anhydrite in part. The thickness of the Lower Cretaceous varies from 750 meters (2,460 ft) up to 1,675 meters (5,495 ft) in the boreholes. The Upper Cretaceous sequence is mainly platform limestone, with marl and interbedded anhydrite. It varies in thickness from 600 to 1,200 meters (2,000 to 3,900 ft). There is evidence for a Cretaceous basin within the Yucatán area that has been named the Yucatán Trough, running approximately south–north, widening northwards, explaining the observed thickness variations.

=== Impact rocks ===
The most common observed impact rocks are suevites, found in many of the boreholes drilled around the Chicxulub crater. Most of the suevites were resedimented soon after the impact by the resurgence of oceanic water into the crater. This gave rise to a layer of suevite extending from the inner part of the crater out as far as the outer rim.

Impact melt rocks are thought to fill the central part of the crater, with a maximum thickness of 3 kilometers (1.9 mi). The samples of melt rock that have been studied have overall compositions similar to that of the basement rocks, with some indications of mixing with carbonate source, presumed to be derived from the Cretaceous carbonates. An analysis of melt rocks sampled by the M0077A borehole indicates two types of melt rock, an upper impact melt (UIM), which has a clear carbonate component as shown by its overall chemistry and the presence of rare limestone clasts and a lower impact melt-bearing unit (LIMB) that lacks any carbonate component. The difference between the two impact melts is interpreted to be a result of the upper part of the initial impact melt, represented by the LIMB in the borehole, becoming mixed with materials from the shallow part of the crust either falling back into the crater or being brought back by the resurgence forming the UIM.

The "pink granite", a granitoid rich in alkali feldspar found in the peak ring borehole shows many deformation features that record the extreme strains associated with the formation of the crater and the subsequent development of the peak ring. The granitoid has an unusually low density and P-wave velocity compared to typical granitic basement rocks. Study of the core from M0077A shows the following deformation features in apparent order of development: pervasive fracturing along and through grain boundaries, a high density of shear faults, bands of cataclasite and ultra-cataclasite and some ductile shear structures. This deformation sequence is interpreted to result from initial crater formation involving acoustic fluidization followed by shear faulting with the development of cataclasites with fault zones containing impact melts.

The peak ring drilling below the sea floor also discovered evidence of a massive hydrothermal system, which modified approximately 1.4 × 10^{5} km^{3} of Earth's crust and lasted for hundreds of thousands of years. These hydrothermal systems may provide support for the impact origin of life hypothesis for the Hadean eon, when the entire surface of Earth was affected by impactors much larger than the Chicxulub impactor.

=== Post-impact geology ===
After the immediate effects of the impact had stopped, sedimentation in the Chicxulub area returned to the shallow water platform carbonate depositional environment that characterised it before the impact. The sequence, which dates back as far as the Paleocene, consists of marl and limestone, reaching a thickness of about 1,000 m (3,000 ft). The K–Pg boundary inside the crater is significantly deeper than in the surrounding area.

On the Yucatán peninsula, the inner rim of the crater is marked by clusters of cenotes, which are the surface expression of a zone of preferential groundwater flow, moving water from a recharge zone in the south to the coast through a karstic aquifer system. From the cenote locations, the karstic aquifer is clearly related to the underlying crater rim, possibly through higher levels of fracturing, caused by differential compaction.

== Astronomical origin and type of impactor ==
There is broad consensus that the Chicxulub impactor was a C-type asteroid with a carbonaceous chondrite-like composition, rather than a comet. This type of asteroid originally formed in the outer Solar System, beyond the orbit of Jupiter. In 1998, a meteorite, approximately 2.5 millimeters (1/8 in) across, was described from a deep sea sediment core from the North Pacific, from a sediment sequence spanning the Cretaceous–Paleogene boundary (when the site was located in the central Pacific), with the meteorite being found at the base of the K-Pg boundary iridium anomaly within the sediment core. It was suggested to be a fragment of the Chicxulub impactor. Analysis suggested that it best fitted the criteria of the CV, CO and CR groups of carbonaceous chondrites. Ruthenium isotope ratios found in impact layers support a carbonaceous chondrite composition for the impactor. A 2021 paper suggested, based on geochemical evidence including the excess of chromium isotope ^{54}Cr and the ratios of platinum group metals found in marine impact layers, that the impactor matched the characteristics of CM or CR carbonaceous chondrites. A 2026 paper reported that the nickel isotopes present constrained the impactor to the CO group instead.

A 2007 Nature report proposed a specific astronomical origin for the Chicxulub asteroid. The authors, William F. Bottke, David Vokrouhlický, and David Nesvorný, argued that a collision in the asteroid belt 160 million years ago between a 170 km (110 mi) diameter parent body and another 60 km (37 mi) diameter body resulted in the Baptistina family of asteroids, the largest surviving member of which is 298 Baptistina. They proposed that the Chicxulub asteroid was also a member of this group. Subsequent evidence has disproven this theory. A 2009 spectrographic analysis revealed that 298 Baptistina has a different composition more typical of an S-type asteroid than the presumed carbonaceous chondrite composition of the Chicxulub impactor. In 2011, data from the Wide-field Infrared Survey Explorer revised the date of the collision which created the Baptistina family to about 80 million years ago, allowing only 15 million years for the process of resonance and collision, which takes many tens of millions of years. In 2010, another hypothesis implicated the newly discovered asteroid 354P/LINEAR, a member of the Flora family, as a possible remnant cohort of the K–Pg impactor. In 2021, a numerical simulation study argued that the impactor likely originated in the outer main part of the asteroid belt.

Some scholars have argued that the impactor was a comet, not an asteroid. Two papers in 1984 proposed it to be a comet originating from the Oort cloud, and it was proposed in 1992 that tidal disruption of comets could potentially increase impact rates. In 2021, Avi Loeb and a colleague suggested in Scientific Reports that the impactor was a fragment from a disrupted comet. A rebuttal in Astronomy & Geophysics countered that Loeb et al. had ignored that the amount of iridium deposited around the globe, 2.0×10^{8} to 2.8×10^{8} kg (4.4×10^{8} to 6.2×10^{8} lb), was too large for a comet of the size implied by the crater, and that they had overestimated likely comet impact rates. They concluded that all available evidence strongly favors an asteroid impactor, effectively ruling out a comet. Ruthenium isotope ratios in impact layers also strongly support an asteroid rather than a comet nature for the impactor.

== See also ==
- Barberton Greenstone Belt
- List of impact structures on Earth
- List of possible impact structures on Earth
- Nadir crater
- Permian–Triassic extinction event
- Tenejapa-Lacandón Formation
- Timeline of Cretaceous–Paleogene extinction event research
