= Nadir crater =

Undersea impact crater off West African coast

Nadir Crater
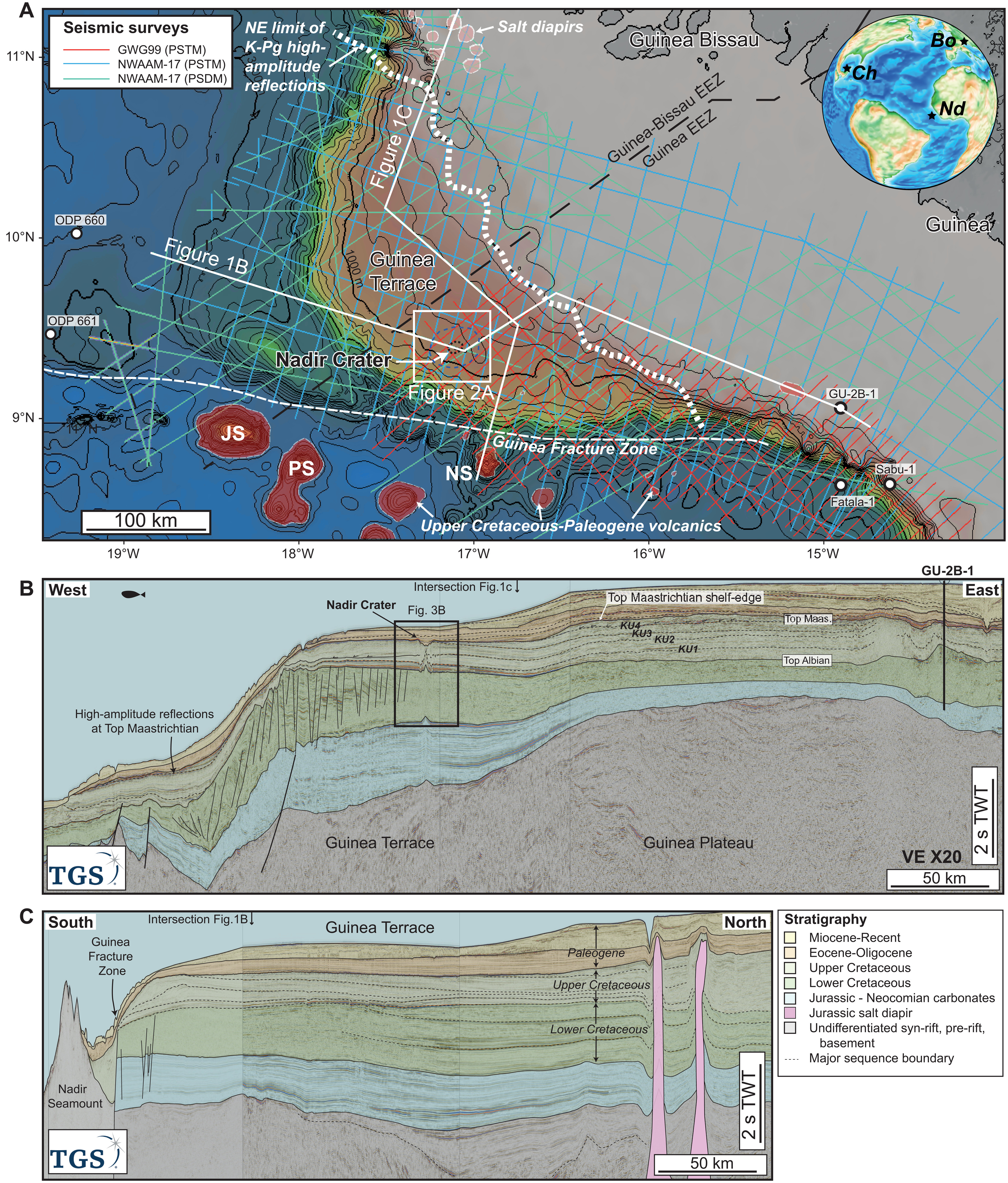
- Map and regional seismic sections showing location of Nadir Crater

- Location within Africa
- Location: Atlantic Ocean; 9.395°N 17.080°W

Impact crater structure
- Diameter: c. 9.2 km
- Depth: c. 800 meters
- Impactor diameter: c. 400 meters
- Age: c. 66 million years
- Exposed: No
- Drilled: No

Nadir Crater is a buried impact crater on the Guinea Plateau in the Atlantic Ocean, around 200 kilometres (125 miles) off the coast of Guinea-Bissau. The feature is named after the Nadir Seamount, located 100 km to the south. The paper announcing the discovery of the feature was published in Science Advances in 2022, with an impact origin being confirmed in 2024. The crater is around 9.2 km (5.7 mi) in diameter, and formed around 66 million years ago, close to the Cretaceous–Paleogene boundary when a small asteroid struck the ocean floor.

== Impact event ==
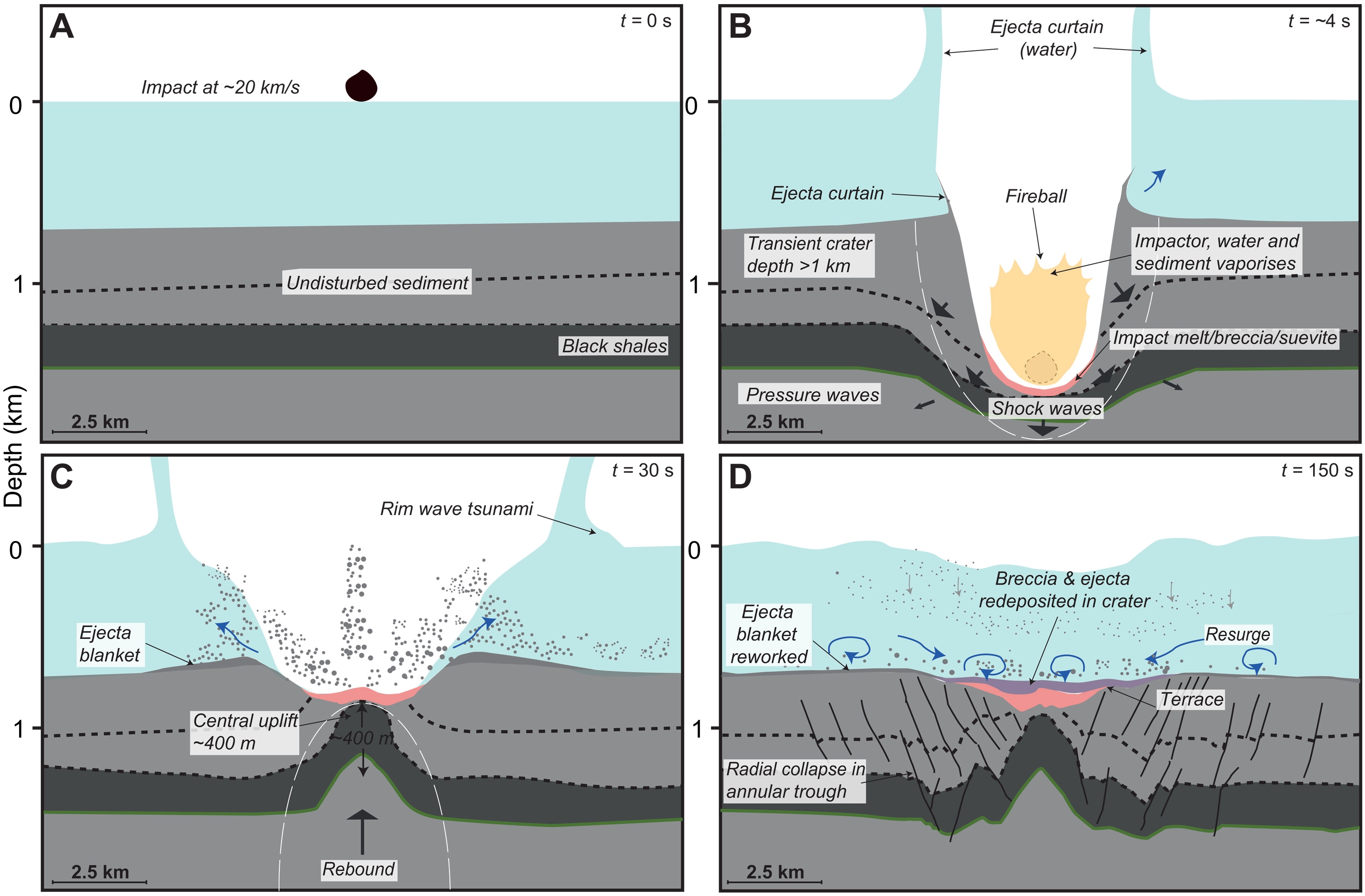
Conceptual model of the impact sequence at the Nadir impact site.

The buried crater features all characteristics of an impact crater: appropriate ratio of width to depth, the height of the rims, and the height of the central uplift. The Nadir Impact occurred at or near the Cretaceous–Paleogene boundary around 66 million years ago, around the same time as the Chicxulub Impact. Numerical simulations of crater formation suggested a sea impact at the depth of around 800 m (1/2 mi) of a ≥400-meter asteroid. It would have produced a fireball with a radius of >5 km (3 mi), instant vaporization of water and sediment near the seabed, tsunami waves up to 1 km high around the crater and substantial amounts of greenhouse gases released from shallow buried black shale deposits. A magnitude 6.5–7 earthquake would have also been produced. The estimated energy yield would have been around 2×10^{19} joules (5 gigatonnes of TNT).

In 2024, detailed seismic data analysis (specifically, from reflection seismology) confirmed the impact origin of the structure beyond reasonable doubt.

To obtain a more precise and narrowly constrained age of the crater, which currently has an uncertainty about one million years, drilling sediment cores from the crater and testing of minerals from the crater floor is key and has been proposed.

== Impactor ==
The impactor is estimated to have been around 400 m (1/4 mi) in diameter, roughly equivalent to the size of the Bennu asteroid. The authors of the paper speculated that it may have been part of a binary asteroid with the Chicxulub impactor or part of an impact cluster, but it is also probable that it is unrelated. Impacts similar in size to the Nadir Impact occur on average every 50,000 to 100,000 years.
