= Alan R. Hildebrand =

Canadian geologist, and planetary scientist (born 1955)

Alan Russell Hildebrand (born 1955) is a Canadian planetary scientist and Associate Professor in the Department of Geoscience at the University of Calgary. He has specialized in the study of asteroid impact cratering, fireballs and meteorite recovery. His work has shed light on the extinction event caused by the Chicxulub asteroid at the end of the Cretaceous period. Hildebrand is one of the leaders of the Prairie Meteorite Network search project.

== Education and career ==
Hildebrand earned a BS in geoscience at the University of New Brunswick in 1977. He received a PhD in Planetary Sciences at the University of Arizona under William Boynton in 1992 with the dissertation "Geochemistry and stratigraphy of the Cretaceous/Tertiary boundary impact ejecta".

In 1978, the Chicxulub Crater in Yucatan, Mexico was discovered by Glen Penfield, but its significance was not recognized at the time. In 1990, as part of his doctoral program, Hildebrand, working with the father-and-son team of Luis and Walter Alvarez, published controversial articles suggesting that a large impact from an asteroid caused the mass extinction at the end of the Cretaceous period. The impact site was eventually determined to be at Chicxulub and the extinction it caused became known as the C-P event.

Hildebrand is part of the Geological Survey of Canada, focusing mainly on the C-P event.

== Selected papers ==
- 2000 The fall, recovery, orbit, and composition of the Tagish Lake meteorite: A new type of carbonaceous chondrite, PG Brown, AR Hildebrand, ME Zolensky, M Grady, RN Clayton, ... Science 290 (5490), 320-325
- 1992 Tektite-bearing, deep-water clastic unit at the Cretaceous-Tertiary boundary in northeastern Mexico, J Smit, A Montanari, NHM Swinburne, W Alvarez, AR Hildebrand, ... Geology 20 (2), 99-103
- 1991 Chicxulub crater: a possible Cretaceous/Tertiary boundary impact crater on the Yucatan Peninsula, Mexico, AR Hildebrand, GT Penfield, DA Kring, M Pilkington, A Camargo Z, ... Geology 19 (9), 867-871
- 1990 Proximal Cretaceous-Tertiary boundary impact deposits in the Caribbean, AR Hildebrand, WV Boynton, Science 248 (4957), 843-847
