= Climate across Cretaceous–Paleogene boundary =

Prehistoric climate changes

The climate across the Cretaceous–Paleogene boundary (K–Pg or formerly the K–T boundary) is very important to geologic time as it marks a catastrophic global extinction event. Numerous theories have been proposed as to why this extinction event happened including an asteroid known as the Chicxulub asteroid, volcanism, or sea level changes. While the mass extinction is well documented, there is much debate about the immediate and long-term climatic and environmental changes caused by the event. The terrestrial climates at this time are poorly known, which limits the understanding of environmentally driven changes in biodiversity that occurred before the Chicxulub crater impact. Oxygen isotopes across the K–T boundary suggest that oceanic temperatures fluctuated in the Late Cretaceous and through the boundary itself. Carbon isotope measurements of benthic foraminifera at the K–T boundary suggest rapid, repeated fluctuations in oceanic productivity in the 3 million years before the final extinction, and that productivity and ocean circulation ended abruptly for at least tens of thousands of years just after the boundary, indicating devastation of terrestrial and marine ecosystems. Some researchers suggest that climate change is the main connection between the impact and the extinction. The impact perturbed the climate system with long-term effects that were much worse than the immediate, direct consequences of the impact.

== K–Pg boundary ==
The K–Pg (formerly K–T) boundary is a thin band of sediment that dates back to 66 million years ago, and is found as a consistent layer all over the planet in over 100 known different locations. K and T are the abbreviations for the Cretaceous and Tertiary periods, respectively, but the name Tertiary has been replaced by "Paleogene" as a formal time or rock unit by the International Commission on Stratigraphy, and Pg is now the abbreviation. This boundary marks the start of the Cenozoic Era. Non-avian dinosaur fossils are found only below the K–Pg boundary which indicates that they became extinct at this event. In addition, mosasaurs, plesiosaurs, pterosaurs and many species of plants and invertebrates do not occur above this boundary, indicating extinction. The boundary was found to be enriched in iridium many times greater than normal (30 times background in Italy and 160 times at Stevns, Denmark), most likely indicating an extraterrestrial event or volcanic activity associated with this interval. Rates of extinction and radiation varied across different clades of organisms.

== Late Cretaceous to K–Pg boundary climate ==
=== Late Cretaceous climate ===
The Cretaceous Period (145–66 Ma), overall, had a relatively warm climate which resulted in high eustatic sea levels and created numerous shallow inland seas. In the Late Cretaceous, the climate was much warmer than present; however, throughout most of the period, a cooling trend is apparent. The tropics were much warmer in the early Cretaceous and became much cooler toward the end of the Cretaceous.

70 million years ago in the Late Cretaceous, the Earth was going through a greenhouse phase. There was abundant CO_{2} in the atmosphere which resulted in global warming. A theory was proposed that ocean circulation changed direction with two water masses in the Atlantic Ocean changing direction. One of the water masses sank to the ocean floor, took direction south, and ended up in the tropical Atlantic. The other water mass replaced the first water mass on the ocean surface around Greenland which warmed the Atlantic Ocean while the rest of the ocean cooled.

Stratigraphic, faunal, and isotope analyses from the very Late Cretaceous (Maastrichtian) indicate some major events. In the South Atlantic, planktic foraminiferal fauna and stable carbonate and oxygen isotopes from paleosol carbonate reveal two major events: late Cretaceous diversification and mass extinction at the end of the Cretaceous, with both events accompanied by major changes in climate and productivity. About 70.5 Ma, species richness increased by 43% which coincided with major cooling in the surface and bottom waters, which increased surface productivity. Between 70 and 69 Ma and 66–65 Ma, isotopic ratios indicate elevated atmospheric CO_{2} pressures with levels of 1000–1400 ppmV and mean annual temperatures in west Texas between 21 and 23 °C. Atmospheric CO_{2} and temperature relations indicate a doubling of pCO_{2} was accompanied by a ~0.6 °C increase in temperature. At 67.5 Ma, species richness and surface productivity began to decline, coinciding with a maximum cooling to 13 °C in surface waters. The mass extinction over the last 500,000 years marks major climatic and moderate productivity changes. Between 200 and 400 kyr before the K–T boundary, surface and deep waters warmed rapidly by 3–4 °C and then cooled again during the last 100 kyr of the Late Cretaceous. The species richness declined during the late Cretaceous cooling and 66% of species were gone by the time of the K–T boundary event.

=== Climate across the K–Pg boundary ===
Across the K–Pg boundary, surface productivity decreased slightly. A temperature gradient of ~0.4 °C per degree of latitude is proposed for North America across the K–Pg boundary. These data of terrestrial climates and ocean temperatures may have been caused by Deccan Traps volcanic gassing, leading to dramatic global climate change. This evidence shows that many of the species' extinctions at this time related to these climate and productivity changes even without the addition of an extraterrestrial impact.

The impact pushed atmospheric CO_{2} levels up from 350 to 500 ppm to approximately 2300 ppm, which would have been sufficient to warm the Earth's surface by ~7.5 °C in the absence of counter forcing by sulfate aerosols.

It is unclear whether continental ice sheets existed during the Late Cretaceous because of conflicting ocean temperature estimates and the failure of circulation models to simulate paleoclimate data.

== Early Paleogene climate ==
The Paleocene (the first epoch of the Paleogene) immediately followed the asteroid impact that destroyed the dinosaurs and the Cretaceous world. It marks the transition between the dinosaurs of the Mesozoic and the emergence of the larger mammals of the Eocene (Cenozoic). The early part of the period experienced cooler temperatures and a more arid climate than existed before the asteroid. This is most likely due to atmospheric dust reflecting sunlight for an extended time. But in the latter part of the epoch, the temperatures warmed significantly, resulting in the absence of glaciated poles and the presence of verdant, tropical forests. The warmer climate increased ocean temperatures leading to a proliferation of species such as coral and other invertebrates.

A 2018 published study estimated that early Palaeogene annual air temperatures, over land and at mid-latitude, averaged about 23–29 °C (± 4.7 °C), which is 5–10 °C higher than most previous estimates. Or for comparison, 10 to 15 °C higher than current annual mean temperatures in these areas, the authors also suggest that the current atmospheric carbon dioxide trajectory, if it continues, could establish these temperatures again.

The global climate of the Paleogene transitioned from hot and humid conditions of the Cretaceous to a cooling trend which persists proceeded today, perhaps starting from the extinction events that occurred at the K–T boundary. This global cooling has been periodically disrupted by warm events such as the Paleocene–Eocene Thermal Maximum. The general cooling trend was partly caused by the formation of the Antarctic Circumpolar Current, which significantly cooled oceanic water temperatures. The Earth's poles were cool and temperate; North America, Europe, Australia, and South America were warm and temperate; equatorial areas were warm; and the climate around the Equator was hot and arid.

In the Paleocene, the Earth's climate was much warmer than today's by as much as 15 °C and atmospheric CO_{2} was around 500 ppmV.

== Mass extinction theories ==
The events at the K–Pg boundary were the influences of several theories on how the climate change and extinction event could have taken place. These hypotheses have centered on either impact events or increased volcanism or both. The consensus among paleontologists is that the main cause was an asteroid impact that severely disrupted the Earth's biosphere causing catastrophic changes to the Earth's climate and ushering in a new era of climate and life.

=== Asteroid impact ===
The theory with the most support to date is for an impact by one or more asteroids. The Alvarez hypothesis, proposed in 1980, gave evidence for this. Luis Alvarez and a team of researchers found sedimentary layers all over the world at the K–T boundary that contained concentrated iridium that was much higher than other sedimentary layers. Iridium is extremely rare in the Earth's crust, but it is very abundant in most asteroids and comets, as asteroids have a concentration of iridium of about 455 parts per billion while the Earth's crust typically contain only about 0.3 parts per billion. They interpreted it as debris from an impact that deposited around the globe.

They concluded that the asteroid was about 9.97 kilometers in diameter which would cause an impact with about the same energy as 100 trillion tons of TNT.

An impact of that magnitude would then create a large dust cloud that would block sunlight and inhibit photosynthesis for many years. The dust particles in the vapor-rich impact plume ejected from the crater and rose above the Earth's atmosphere, enveloped the Earth, and then descended through the atmosphere around the planet which blocked sunlight from reaching Earth's surface. Dust occluded sunlight for up to six months, halting or severely impairing photosynthesis, and thus seriously disrupting continental and marine food chains. This would then kill most plant life and phytoplankton which would also kill many of the organisms that depended on them to survive. Sulfuric acid aerosols were also ejected into the atmosphere which blocked about 20 percent of incoming sunlight. These sulfuric aerosols would take years to fully dissipate from the atmosphere. The impact site also contained sulfur-rich sediments called evaporites, which would have reacted with water vapor to produce sulfate aerosols. Sean Gulick, a research scientist at the University of Texas, postulated that an increase in the atmospheric concentration of the sulfate compounds could have made the impact deadlier in two ways: altering climate from sulfate aerosols in the upper atmosphere having a cooling effect, and generating acid rain from water vapor that can flush the lower atmosphere of sulfate aerosols. Earlier studies had suggested both effects might result from the impact, but to a lesser degree.

Many other global catastrophes could have occurred as a result of the asteroid impact. Analyses of the fluid inclusions show that oxygen levels were very high during this time; this would support evidence for intense combustion. This concludes that global firestorms may have resulted from the initial incendiary blast. If global, widespread fires occurred, carbon dioxide content would have increased in the atmosphere, causing a temporary greenhouse effect once the dust cloud settled.

=== Deccan Traps ===
The Deccan Trap eruptions were associated with a deep mantle plume. The theory suggests that about 66 million years ago, the mantle plume at the Réunion hotspot burned through the Earth's crust and flooded western India with basaltic lava. The basaltic lava covered over 1,609,344 square kilometers of India under successive lava flow. Volcanic gases, mostly sulfur dioxide, were released during the massive eruption which contributed to climate change worldwide. The sudden cooling due to the sulfuric gases became a major stressor on biodiversity at this time. Rapid eruption of the vast Deccan Traps lava fields would have flooded Earth's surface with CO_{2}, overwhelming surface systems and sinks, triggering rapid K–T transition greenhouse warming, chemical changes in the oceans and the mass extinctions.

Although iridium was a major basis for the Chicxulub impact theory, it was proposed that iridium could have come from the mantle plume volcanism. The Earth's core is rich in Iridium, and it is suggested that the mantle plume transported the iridium from the core to the surface during the eruptions. In fact, the hotspot volcano that produced the Deccan traps is still releasing iridium today.

It is the current consensus of the scientific community that the Deccan Traps either only contributed to the extinction along with the Chicxulub impact, or that the Chicxulub impact was the main culprit in causing the extinctions. A direct link between Deccan volcanism and the mass extinction has remained obscure due to the lack of intertrappean marine sediments with age diagnostic microfossils that contain isotope data correlating the eruptions with the extinction.

=== Sea level ===
A theory for sea level fall in the Maastrichtian time period, the latest age of the late Cretaceous, has been proposed as evidence. It shows that sea level fell more at this time of the Cenozoic than any time during the Mesozoic. In rock layers at this time, the earliest layers represent sea beds, later layers represented shorelines, and the latest represented continental environments. The layers do not show distortion or tilting that is related to mountains, so sea level fall is most likely the cause. A massive fall in sea level would have greatly reduced the continental shelf margin which could have caused a mass extinction but for marine species only. This regression most likely would have caused a climate change by disrupting ocean currents and winds and therefore increased global temperatures. Other consequences include the loss of epeiric seas and the expansion of freshwater environments. Although the expansion of freshwater was beneficial to freshwater vertebrates, marine environment species still suffered.

== Species affected ==
Species that depended on photosynthesis suffered the most as the sunlight was blocked by atmospheric particles which reduced the solar energy that reached that Earth's surface. Photosynthesizing organisms such as phytoplankton and plants started to die out which caused herbivorous species to suffer as well because of their heavy dependency on plants for food. Consequently, many predators became extinct as well.

Coccolithophorids and molluscs (including ammonites) became extinct or suffered great losses. For example, it is thought that ammonites were the principal food of mosasaurs, a group of giant marine reptiles that became extinct at the boundary.

Omnivores, insectivores and carrion-eaters survived the extinction event, due to the increased availability of their food sources. Mammals and birds that survived the extinction fed on insects, worms, and snails, which then fed on dead plant and animal matter. Scientists hypothesize that these organisms survived the collapse of plant-based food chains because they fed on detritus and non-living organic material.

== See also ==
- Timeline of Cretaceous-Paleogene extinction event research
