= Baptistina family =

Asteroid group

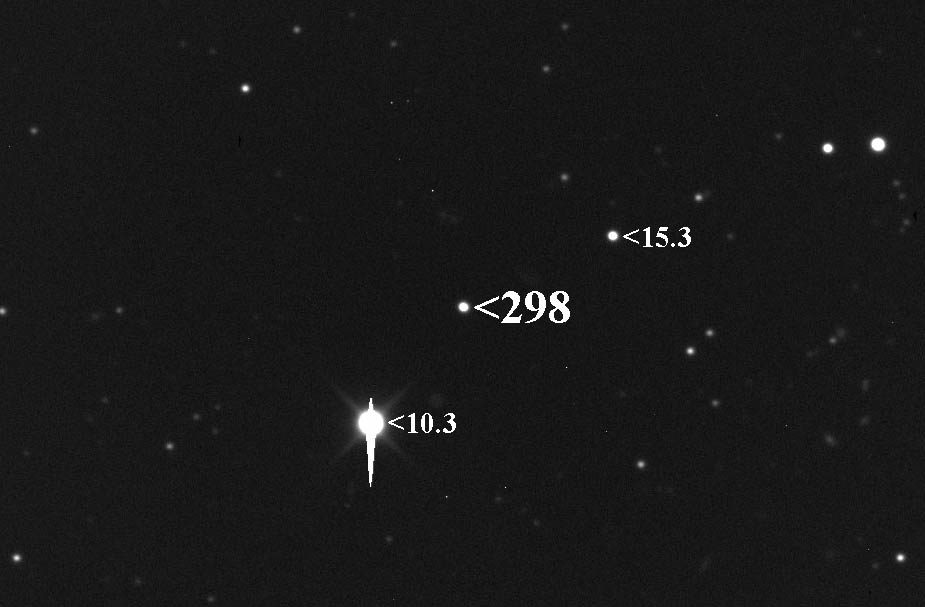
298 Baptistina (center), one of the largest presumed remnants of the Baptistina family. Here it is shown flanked on either side by two bright stars in the background.

The Baptistina family (FIN: 403) is an asteroid family of more than 2500 members that was probably produced by the breakup of an asteroid 170 km (110 mi) across 80 million years ago following an impact with a smaller body. The two largest presumed remnants of the parent asteroid are main-belt asteroids 298 Baptistina and 1696 Nurmela. The Baptistina family is part of the larger Flora clan. It was briefly speculated that the Chicxulub impactor was part of the Baptistina family of asteroids, but this was disproven in 2011 using data from the Wide-field Infrared Survey Explorer (WISE).

The Baptistina family consists of darkly colored asteroids and meteoroids in similar orbits. Baptistina broke up into thousands of fragments about 80 million years ago.

== Members ==
298 Baptistina is the namesake asteroid and largest presumed remnant of the Baptistina family. It was discovered on 9 September 1890 by Auguste Charlois at the Nice Observatory. The source of its name is unknown. It measures about 13 to 30 kilometres (8 to 19 mi) in diameter. Although it has an orbit similar to the Flora family asteroids, Baptistina is an unrelated interloper.

Other members of the Baptistina family include 1696 Nurmela, 2858 Carlosporter, and (7255) 1993 VY1.

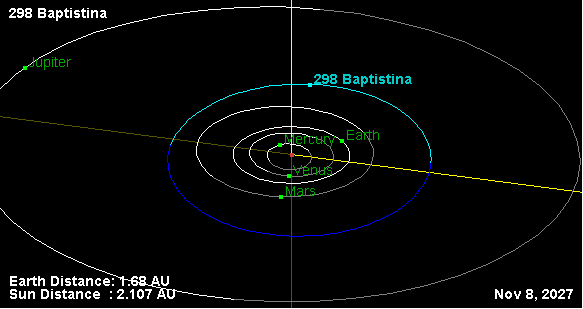
Orbit of 298 Baptistina

== Composition ==
It was originally thought that the Baptistina family may consist of uncommon carbonaceous chondrite. In 2006, nine asteroids within the Baptistina family were given known classifications: three are S-type asteroids, two are X-type asteroids, another two are A/R-type asteroids, one is C-type and one is V-type. However, any conclusions taken from this were highly speculative, as very few members in the family were classified, and not even the albedo of the meteors was known at the time.

Following the impact of the Chelyabinsk meteor in 2013, a paper published in the journal Icarus showed that shock produced during impact of a large asteroid can darken otherwise bright silicate material. Spectral analysis of the darkly-colored portions of the non-carbonaceous Chelyabinsk meteorite closely matched the color of members of the Baptistina family, showing that a low albedo does not necessarily indicate the composition of the family.

== Formerly proposed impacts ==
In 2007, it was proposed that chromium concentrations in 66-million-year-old sediment layers at the Cretaceous–Paleogene boundary (K–T boundary) on Earth suggested that the impactor that gouged out Chicxulub Crater and caused the Cretaceous–Paleogene extinction event belonged to the Baptistina family. Concerns were raised regarding the reputed link, in part because very few solid observational constraints existed of the asteroid or family. One year later, it was discovered that 298 Baptistina does not share the same chemical signature as the source of the Cretaceous–Paleogene boundary. Because of the timeframe, it had also been suggested that the impactor that produced the lunar crater Tycho 108 million years ago was also a member of the group, as well as the Venusian craters Mead, Isabella, Meitner, and Klenova.

In 2011, data from the Wide-field Infrared Survey Explorer (WISE) revised the date of the proposed collision which broke up the Baptistina parent asteroid to about 80 million years ago. If correct, this data means it is very unlikely that the K/Pg impactor was part of this family of asteroids, as it typically takes many tens of millions of years for an asteroid to reach a resonance with Earth and then collide, much more than the 15 million between this breakup and the collision of the K–T impactor. "As a result of the WISE science team's investigation, the demise of the dinosaurs remains in the cold case files," said Lindley Johnson, program executive for the Near Earth Object Observation Program.
