= 1696 Nurmela =

Baptistina asteroid

Discovery
- Discovered by: Y. Väisälä
- Discovery site: Turku Obs.
- Discovery date: 18 March 1939

Designations
- Named after: Tauno Nurmela (University of Turku)
- Alternative designations: 1939 FF · 1939 GL; 1949 DK · 1951 YK
- Minor planet category: main-belt · inner Baptistina · Flora

Orbital characteristics
- Epoch 23 March 2018 (JD 2458200.5)
- Uncertainty parameter 0
- Observation arc: 78.30 yr (28,598 d)
- Aphelion: 2.4842 AU
- Perihelion: 2.0391 AU
- Semi-major axis: 2.2616 AU
- Eccentricity: 0.0984
- Orbital period (sidereal): 3.40 yr (1,242 d)
- Mean anomaly: 76.752°
- Mean motion: 0° 17^{m} 23.28^{s} / day
- Inclination: 6.0374°
- Longitude of ascending node: 21.035°
- Argument of perihelion: 164.84°

Physical characteristics
- Mean diameter: 6.06±1.18 km 7.69±2.07 km 9.232±0.181 km 9.911±0.056 km 10.31±0.44 km 14.64 km (calculated)
- Synodic rotation period: 3.1587±0.0001 h 3.1587±0.0001 h 3.159±0.001 h (Note: Lightcurve plot of (1696) Nurmela, by Stephens at the CS3 (U81) in April 2017, with rotation period 3.159±0.001 hours and a brightness amplitude of 0.58±0.02 mag. Quality code of 3. Summary figures at the LCDB)
- Geometric albedo: 0.057 (assumed); 0.116±0.011; 0.1246±0.0166; 0.155±0.021; 0.18±0.13; 0.28±0.20
- Spectral type: C (assumed)
- Absolute magnitude (H): 12.90; 13.19

1696 Nurmela, provisional designation 1939 FF, is a Baptistina asteroid from the inner regions of the asteroid belt, approximately 10 kilometers (6 miles) in diameter. It was discovered on 18 March 1939, by Finnish astronomer Yrjö Väisälä at Turku Observatory in Southwest Finland, and named after Finnish academician Tauno Nurmela. The possibly elongated asteroid has a rotation period of 3.15 hours.

== Orbit and classification ==
Nurmela is the second-largest member of the small Baptistina family (403), a large inner-belt family, named after 298 Baptistina, its largest member and namesake. When applying the hierarchical clustering method to its proper orbital elements, it is also a member of the Flora family (402), a giant asteroid family and the largest family of stony asteroids in the main-belt.

It orbits the Sun in the inner main-belt at a distance of 2.0–2.5 AU once every 3 years and 5 months (1,242 days; semi-major axis of 2.26 AU). Its orbit has an eccentricity of 0.10 and an inclination of 6° with respect to the ecliptic. The body's observation arc begins with its official discovery observation at Turku.

== Physical characteristics ==
Nurmela is an assumed carbonaceous C-type asteroid, while its albedo and membership to the Baptistina family is indicative for an X-type.

=== Rotation period ===
In March and April 2007, two rotational lightcurves of Nurmela was obtained from photometric observations by Adrián Galád and Robert Stephens. They gave an identical rotation period of 3.1587 hours with a brightness variation of 0.33 and 0.42 magnitude, respectively (U=3/3). In April 2017, another observation by Stephens gave a concurring period of 3.159 hours (U=3) with an amplitude of 0.58 magnitude, indicative for an elongated shape.

=== Diameter and albedo ===
According to the surveys carried out by the Japanese Akari satellite and the NEOWISE mission of NASA's Wide-field Infrared Survey Explorer, Nurmela measures between 6.06 and 10.31 kilometers in diameter and its surface has an albedo between 0.116 and 0.28.

The Collaborative Asteroid Lightcurve Link assumes a standard albedo for carbonaceous asteroids of 0.057 and calculates a diameter of 14.64 kilometers based on an absolute magnitude of 12.9.

== Naming ==
This minor planet was named in honor of Finnish academician Tauno Kalervo Nurmela (1907–1985), some time professor of Romanic philology and later chancellor of University of Turku. The official naming citation was published by the Minor Planet Center on 1 April 1980 (M.P.C. 5281).
