= Cretaceous–Paleogene boundary =

Geological boundary between time periods

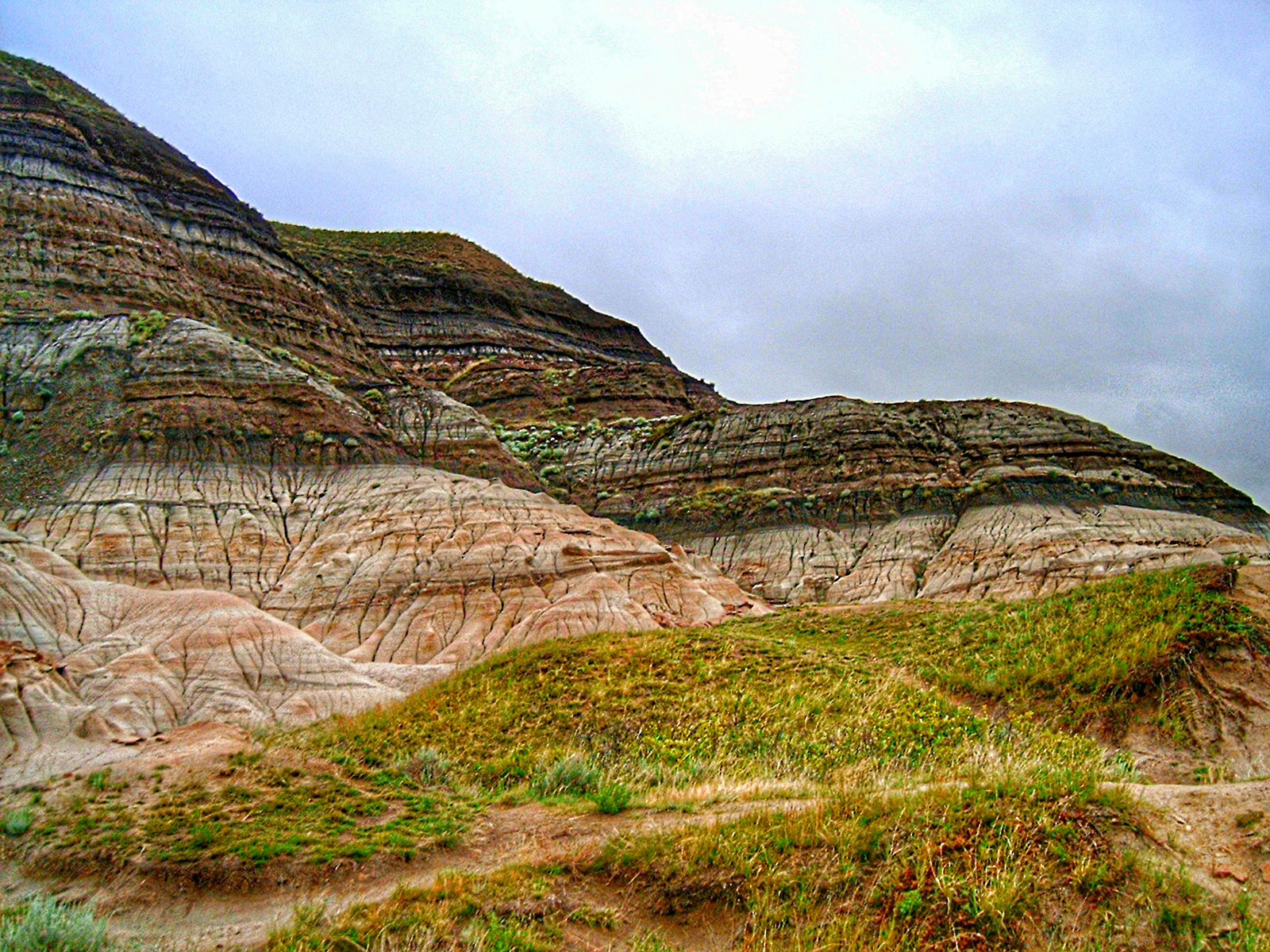
Badlands near Drumheller, Alberta, Canada, where glacial and post-glacial erosion have exposed the K–Pg boundary along with much other sedimentation (the exact boundary is a thin line not obviously visible).

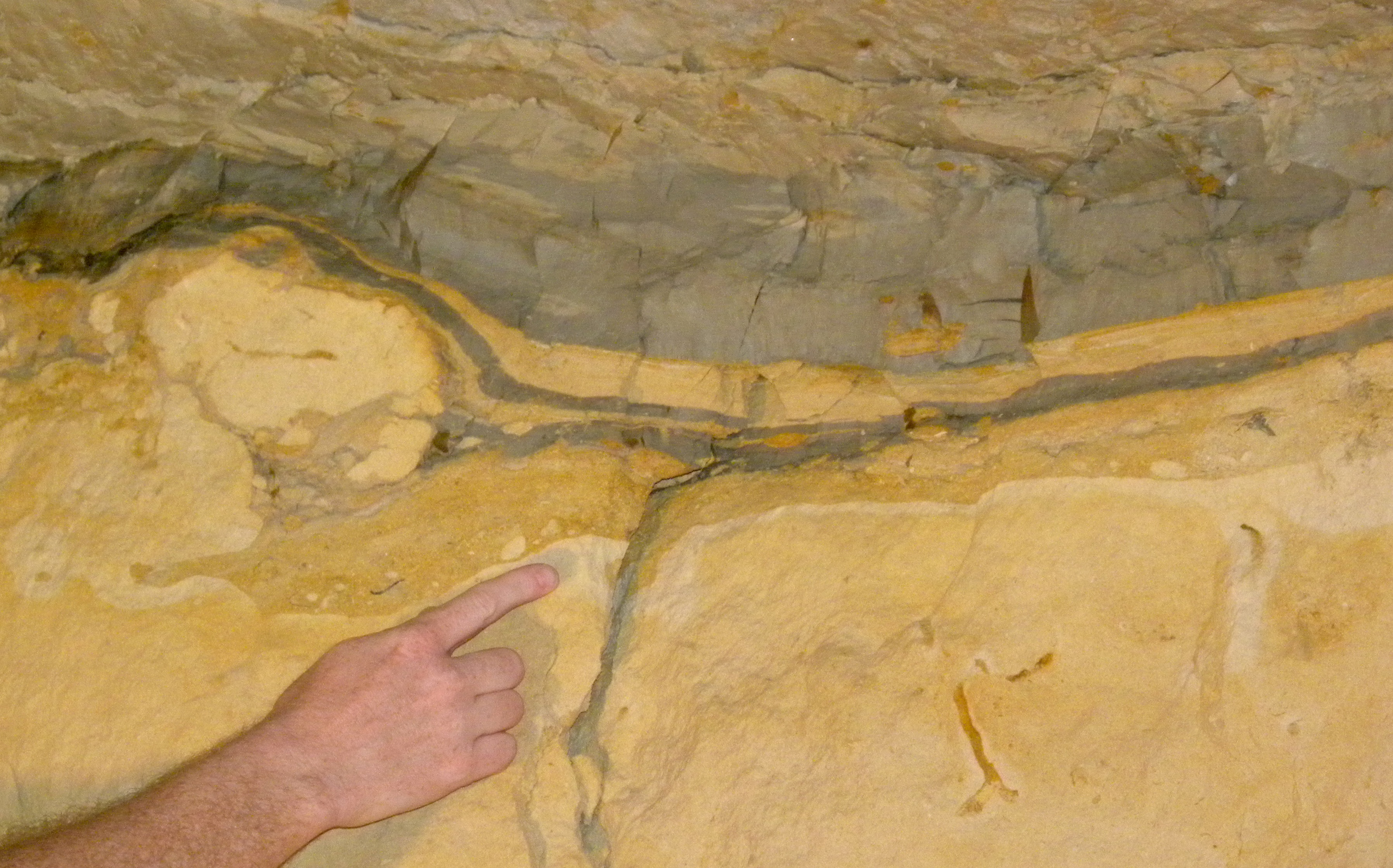
Complex Cretaceous-Paleogene clay layer (gray) in the Geulhemmergroeve tunnels near Geulhem, the Netherlands. Finger is just below the actual K–Pg boundary.

The Cretaceous–Paleogene (K–Pg) boundary, formerly known as the Cretaceous–Tertiary (K–T) boundary, (Note: This former designation has as a part of it a term, 'Tertiary' (abbreviated as T), that is now discouraged as a formal geochronological unit by the International Commission on Stratigraphy.) is a geological signature, usually a thin band of rock containing much more iridium than other bands. The K–Pg boundary marks the end of the Cretaceous Period, the last period of the Mesozoic Era, and marks the beginning of the Paleogene Period, the first period of the Cenozoic Era. Its age is usually estimated at 66 million years, with radiometric dating yielding a more precise age of 66.043 ± 0.043 Ma.

The K–Pg boundary is associated with the Cretaceous–Paleogene extinction event, a mass extinction which destroyed a majority of the world's Mesozoic species, including all dinosaurs except for some birds.

Strong evidence exists that the extinction coincided with a large meteorite impact at the Chicxulub crater and the generally accepted scientific theory is that this impact triggered the extinction event.

The word "Cretaceous" is derived from the Latin "creta" (chalk). It is abbreviated K (as in "K–Pg boundary") for its German translation "Kreide" (chalk).

== Proposed causes ==
=== Chicxulub crater ===
Chicxulub crater
- Chicxulub impact structure
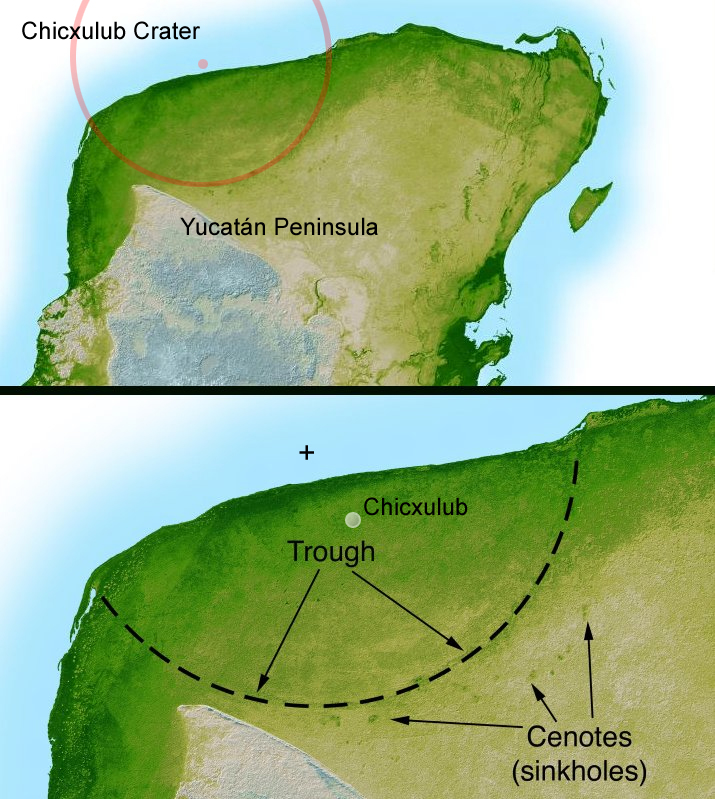
- Imaging from NASA's Shuttle Radar Topography Mission STS-99 reveals part of the 180 km (110 mi) diameter ring of the crater. The numerous sinkholes clustered around the trough of the crater suggest a prehistoric oceanic basin in the depression left by the impact.

- Location within North America
- Location: Yucatán, Mexico; 21°24′0″N 89°31′0″W

Impact crater structure
- Confidence: Confirmed
- Diameter: 150 km (93 mi)
- Depth: 20 km (12 mi)
- Impactor diameter: 10–15 km (6.2–9.3 mi)
- Age: 66.043 ± 0.043 Ma; Cretaceous–Paleogene boundary
- Exposed: No
- Drilled: Yes
- Bolide type: Carbonaceous chondrite

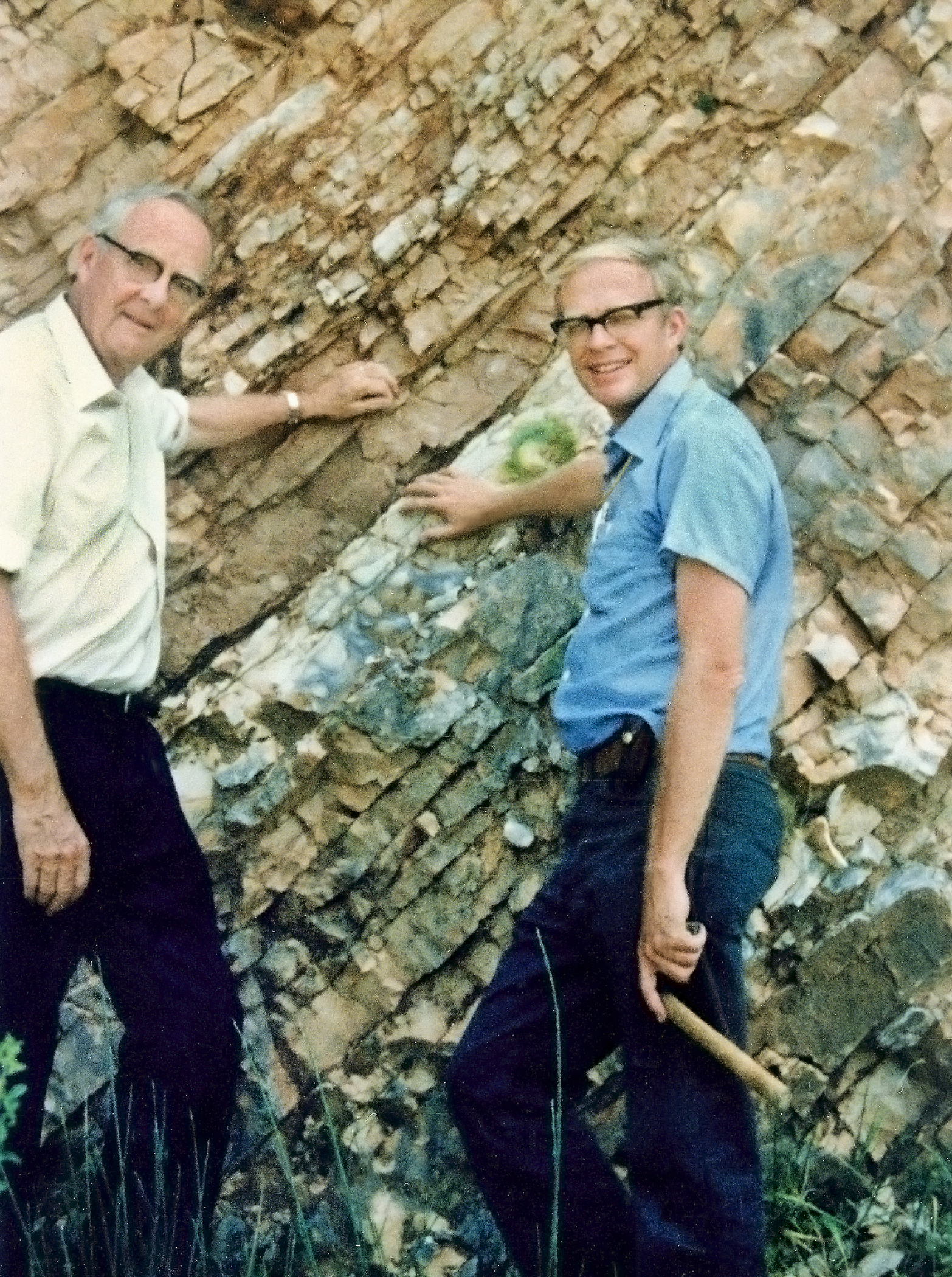
Luis (left) and his son Walter Alvarez (right) at the K-Pg Boundary in Gubbio, Italy, 1981

In 1980, a team of researchers led by Nobel prize-winning physicist Luis Alvarez, his son, geologist Walter Alvarez, and chemists Frank Asaro and Helen Vaughn Michel discovered that sedimentary layers found all over the world at the Cretaceous–Paleogene boundary contain a concentration of iridium hundreds of times greater than normal. They suggested that this layer was evidence of an impact event that triggered worldwide climate disruption and caused the Cretaceous–Paleogene extinction event, a mass extinction in which 75% of plant and animal species on Earth suddenly became extinct, including all non-avian dinosaurs.

When it was originally proposed, one problem with the "Alvarez hypothesis" (as it came to be known) was that no documented crater matched the event. This was not a lethal blow to the theory; while the crater resulting from the impact would have been larger than 250 km (160 mi) in diameter, Earth's geological processes hide or destroy craters over time.

The Chicxulub crater is an impact crater buried underneath the Yucatán Peninsula in Mexico. Its center is located near the town of Chicxulub, after which the crater is named. It was formed by a large asteroid or comet about 10–15 km (6.2–9.3 mi) in diameter, the Chicxulub impactor, striking the Earth. The date of the impact coincides precisely with the Cretaceous–Paleogene boundary (K–Pg boundary), slightly more than 66 million years ago.

The crater is estimated to be over 150 km (93 mi) in diameter and 20 km (12 mi) in depth, well into the continental crust of the region of about 10–30 km (6.2–18.6 mi) depth. It makes the feature the second of the largest confirmed impact structures on Earth, and the only one whose peak ring is intact and directly accessible for scientific research.

The crater was discovered by Antonio Camargo and Glen Penfield, geophysicists who had been looking for petroleum in the Yucatán during the late 1970s. Penfield was initially unable to obtain evidence that the geological feature was a crater and gave up his search. Later, through contact with Alan Hildebrand in 1990, Penfield obtained samples that suggested it was an impact feature. Evidence for the impact origin of the crater includes shocked quartz, a gravity anomaly, and tektites in surrounding areas.

In 2016, a scientific drilling project drilled deep into the peak ring of the impact crater, hundreds of meters below the current sea floor, to obtain rock core samples from the impact itself. The discoveries were widely seen as confirming current theories related to both the crater impact and its effects.

The shape and location of the crater indicate further causes of devastation in addition to the dust cloud. The asteroid landed right on the coast and would have caused gigantic tsunamis, for which evidence has been found all around the coast of the Caribbean and eastern United States—marine sand in locations which were then inland, and vegetation debris and terrestrial rocks in marine sediments dated to the time of the impact.

The asteroid landed in a bed of anhydrite (CaSO_{4}) or gypsum (CaSO_{4}·2(H_{2}O)), which would have ejected large quantities of sulfur trioxide SO_{3} that combined with water to produce a sulfuric acid aerosol. This would have further reduced the sunlight reaching the Earth's surface and then over several days, precipitated planet-wide as acid rain, killing vegetation, plankton and organisms which build shells from calcium carbonate (coccolithophorids and molluscs).

=== Deccan Traps ===
Before 2000, arguments that the Deccan Traps flood basalts caused the extinction were usually linked to the view that the extinction was gradual, as the flood basalt events were thought to have started around 68 Ma and lasted for over 2 million years. However, there is evidence that two thirds of the Deccan Traps were created within 1 million years about 65.5 Ma, so these eruptions would have caused a fairly rapid extinction, possibly a period of thousands of years, but still a longer period than what would be expected from a single impact event.

The Deccan Traps could have caused extinction through several mechanisms, including the release of dust and sulfuric aerosols into the air which might have blocked sunlight and thereby reduced photosynthesis in plants. In addition, Deccan Trap volcanism might have resulted in carbon dioxide emissions which would have increased the greenhouse effect when the dust and aerosols cleared from the atmosphere.

In the years when the Deccan Traps theory was linked to a slower extinction, Luis Alvarez replied that paleontologists were being misled by sparse data. While his assertion was not initially well-received, later intensive field studies of fossil beds lent weight to his claim. Eventually, most paleontologists began to accept the idea that the mass extinctions at the end of the Cretaceous were largely or at least partly due to a massive Earth impact. However, even Walter Alvarez has acknowledged that there were other major changes on Earth even before the impact, such as a drop in sea level and massive volcanic eruptions that produced the Indian Deccan Traps, and these may have contributed to the extinctions.

=== Multiple impact event ===
Several other craters also appear to have been formed about the time of the K–Pg boundary. This suggests the possibility of nearly simultaneous multiple impacts, perhaps from a fragmented asteroidal object, similar to the Shoemaker–Levy 9 cometary impact with Jupiter. Among these are the Boltysh crater, a 24 km (15 mi) diameter impact crater in Ukraine (65.17 ± 0.64 Ma); and the Silverpit crater, a 20 km (12 mi) diameter proposed impact crater in the North Sea (60–65 Ma). Any other craters that might have formed in the Tethys Ocean would have been obscured by erosion and tectonic events such as the relentless northward drift of Africa and India.

A very large structure in the sea floor off the west coast of India was interpreted in 2006 as a crater by three researchers. The potential Shiva crater, 450–600 km (280–370 mi) in diameter, would substantially exceed Chicxulub in size and has been estimated to be about 66 mya, an age consistent with the K–Pg boundary. An impact at this site could have been the triggering event for the nearby Deccan Traps. However, this feature has not yet been accepted by the geologic community as an impact crater and may just be a sinkhole depression caused by salt withdrawal.

=== Maastrichtian marine regression ===
Clear evidence exists that sea levels fell in the final stage of the Cretaceous by more than at any other time in the Mesozoic era. In some Maastrichtian stage rock layers from various parts of the world, the later ones are terrestrial; earlier ones represent shorelines and the earliest represent seabeds. These layers do not show the tilting and distortion associated with mountain building; therefore, the likeliest explanation is a regression, that is, a buildout of sediment, but not necessarily a drop in sea level. No direct evidence exists for the cause of the regression, but the explanation which is currently accepted as the most likely is that the mid-ocean ridges became less active and therefore sank under their own weight as sediment from uplifted orogenic belts filled in structural basins.

A severe regression would have greatly reduced the continental shelf area, which is the most species-rich part of the sea, and therefore could have been enough to cause a marine mass extinction. However, research concludes that this change would have been insufficient to cause the observed level of ammonite extinction. The regression would also have caused climate changes, partly by disrupting winds and ocean currents and partly by reducing the Earth's albedo and therefore increasing global temperatures.

Marine regression also resulted in the reduction in area of epeiric seas, such as the Western Interior Seaway of North America. The reduction of these seas greatly altered habitats, removing coastal plains that ten million years before had been host to diverse communities such as are found in rocks of the Dinosaur Park Formation. Another consequence was an expansion of freshwater environments, since continental runoff now had longer distances to travel before reaching oceans. While this change was favorable to freshwater vertebrates, those that prefer marine environments, such as sharks, suffered.

=== Supernova hypothesis ===
Another discredited cause for the K–Pg extinction event is cosmic radiation from a nearby supernova explosion. An iridium anomaly at the boundary is consistent with this hypothesis. However, analysis of the boundary layer sediments failed to find plutonium-244, a byproduct of supernovae and neutron star mergers, which is the longest-lived plutonium isotope, with a half-life of 81 million years.

=== Verneshot ===
An attempt to link volcanism – like the Deccan Traps – and impact events causally in the other direction compared to the proposed Shiva crater is the so-called Verneshot hypothesis (named for Jules Verne), which proposes that volcanism might have gotten so intense as to "shoot up" material into a ballistic trajectory into space before it fell down as an impactor. Due to the spectacular nature of this proposed mechanism, the scientific community has largely reacted with skepticism to this hypothesis.

=== Multiple causes ===
It is possible that more than one of these hypotheses may be a partial solution to the mystery, and that more than one of these events may have occurred. Both the Deccan Traps and the Chicxulub impact may have been important contributors. For example, the most recent dating of the Deccan Traps supports the idea that rapid eruption rates in the Deccan Traps may have been triggered by large seismic waves radiated by the impact.

== See also ==
- Climate across Cretaceous–Paleogene boundary
- Sub-Paleogene surface
- Tanis (fossil site)
