= Walter Alvarez =

American geologist (born 1940)

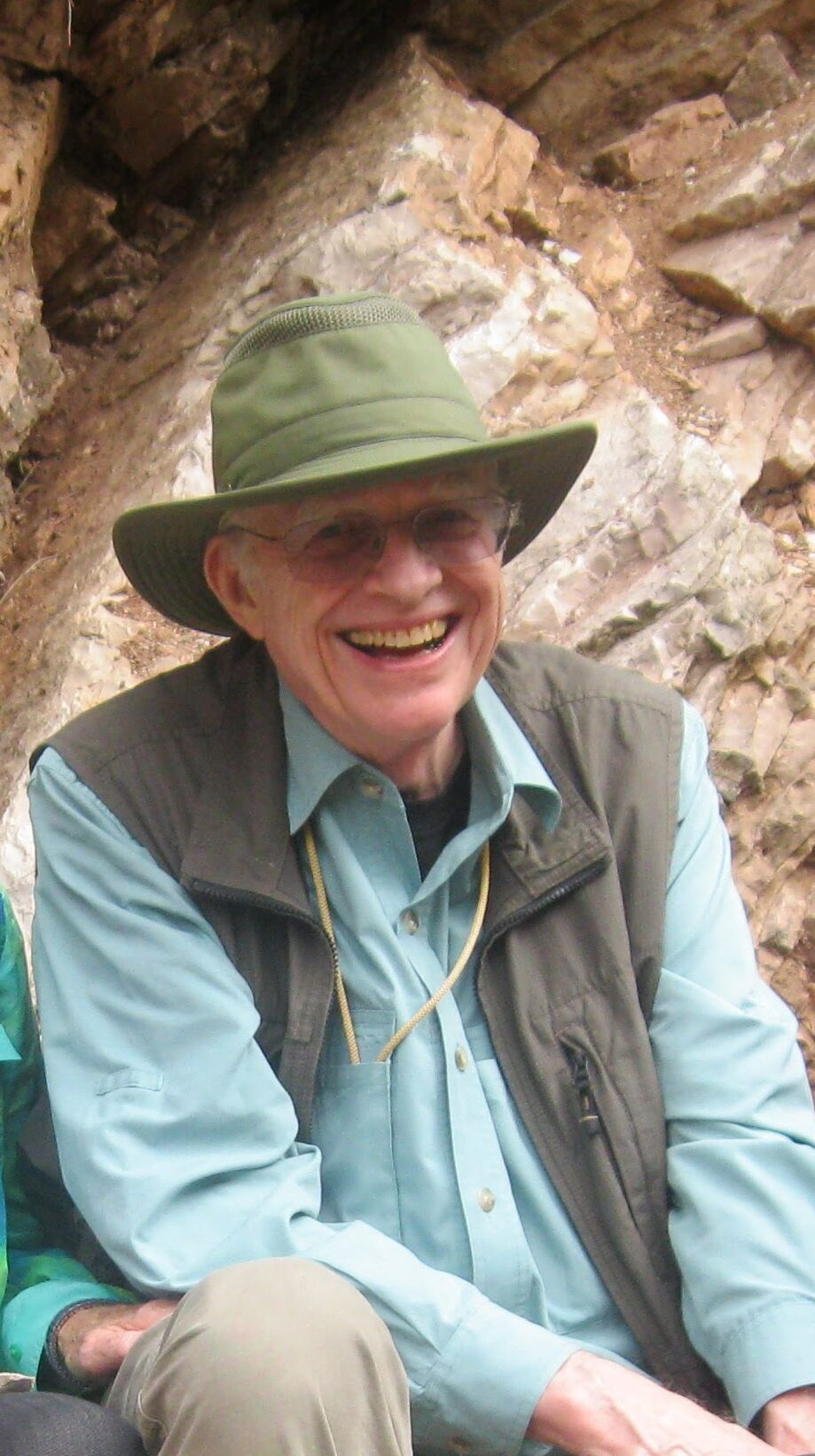
- Walter Alvarez at the Cretaceous–Paleogene boundary in Gubbio, Italy
- Born: Walter Alvarez; October 3, 1940 (age 85); Berkeley, California, U.S.
- Education: Carleton College (BS); Princeton University (PhD)
- Known for: Alvarez hypothesis
- Spouse: Milly Alvarez (m. 1963)
- Father: Luis Walter Alvarez
- Awards: G. K. Gilbert Award (1985); Penrose Medal (2002); Vetlesen Prize (2008); Barringer Medal (2013)
- Scientific career
- Fields: Geology
- Workplaces: University of California, Berkeley; Columbia University

Walter Alvarez (born October 3, 1940) is an American professor in the Earth and Planetary Science department at the University of California, Berkeley. He and his father, Nobel Prize–winning physicist Luis Alvarez, developed the theory that dinosaurs were killed by an asteroid impact.

== Biography ==
Born in Berkeley, California, Alvarez is the son of Luis Walter Alvarez, a Nobel Prize-winner in physics, and Geraldine Smithwick. His grandfather was physician Walter C. Alvarez and his great-grandfather, Spanish-born Luis F. Alvarez, worked as a doctor in Hawaii and developed a method for the better diagnosis of macular leprosy. His great-aunt Mabel Alvarez was an artist and oil painter from California.

Alvarez earned his B.A. in geology in 1962 from Carleton College in Minnesota and Ph.D. in geology from Princeton University in 1967. He worked for American Overseas Petroleum Limited in the Netherlands, and in Libya at the time of Colonel Gaddafi's revolution. Having developed a side interest in archaeological geology, he left the oil company and spent some time in Italy, studying the Roman volcanics and their influence on patterns of settlement in early Roman times.

Alvarez then moved to Lamont–Doherty Geological Observatory of Columbia University, and began studying the Mediterranean tectonics in the light of the new theory of plate tectonics. His work on tectonic paleomagnetism in Italy led to a study of the geomagnetic reversals recorded in Italian deep-sea limestones. Alvarez and his colleagues were able to date the reversals for an interval of more than 100 million years of the Earth's history by using Foraminifera biostratigraphy.

== Impact theory ==
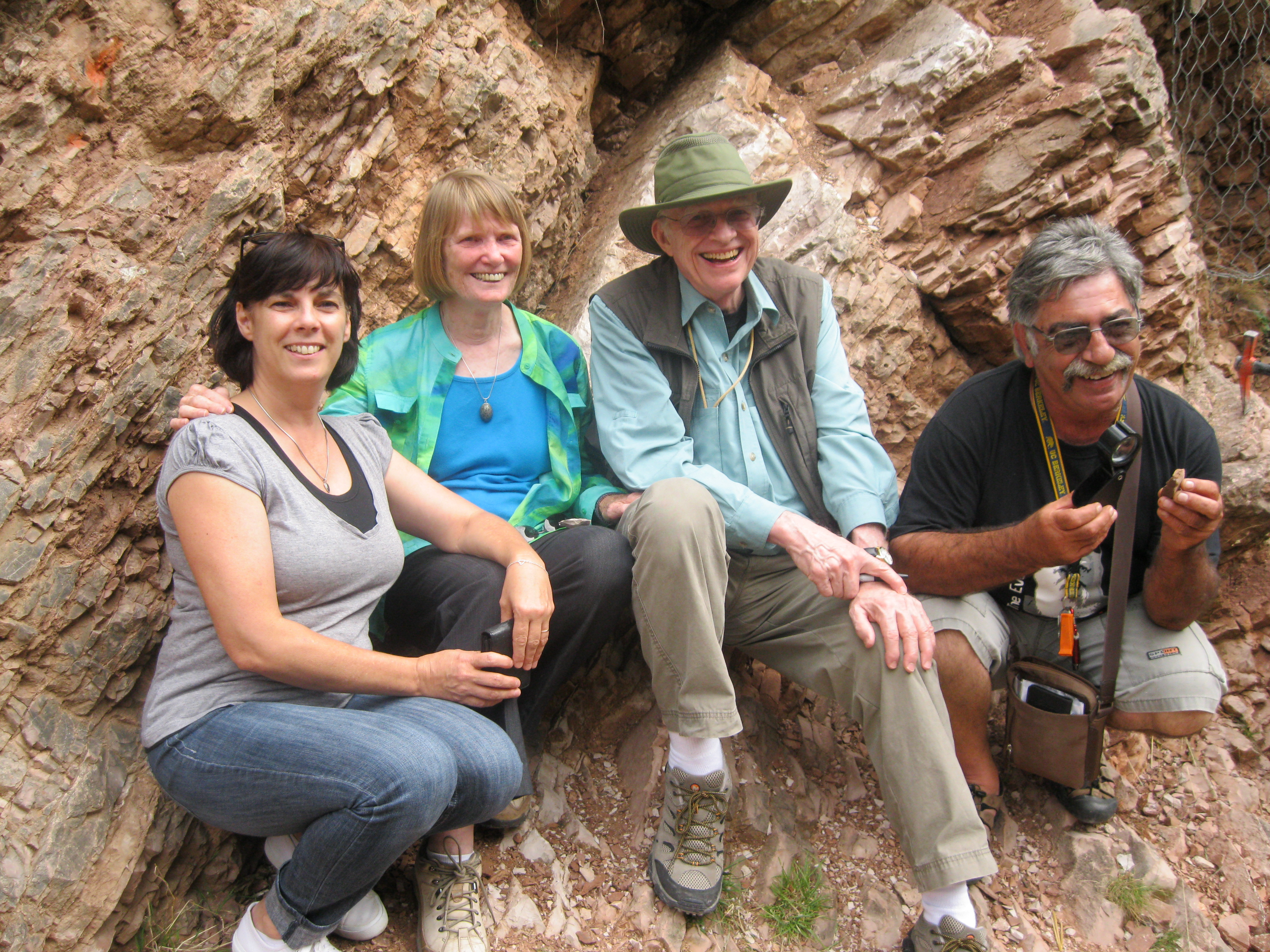
Walter Alvarez at the original site where he discovered the dinosaur extinction evidence near Gubbio, Italy.

Alvarez and his father Luis W. Alvarez, together with Frank Asaro and Helen Michel, discovered that a clay layer occurring right at the Cretaceous–Paleogene (K-Pg) boundary was highly enriched in the element iridium. Since iridium enrichment is common in asteroids, but very uncommon on the Earth, they postulated that the layer had been created by the impact of a large asteroid with the Earth, and that this impact was the likely cause of the Cretaceous–Paleogene extinction event, which occurred 66 million years ago and was responsible for the elimination of 75% of all then-existent species, including all non-avian dinosaurs.

This iridium enrichment has now been observed in many other sites around the world. In addition, the Chicxulub crater off the northeast coast of the Yucatan Peninsula was identified and is now regarded as the definitive evidence of a large impact. Consequently, a majority of scientists now accept an impact scenario as the most likely cause for the Cretaceous–Paleogene extinction. Alvarez's 1997 book, T. rex and the Crater of Doom, details the discovery of the event.

In addition to his interest in extinction events and impacts, Alvarez has contributed to the understanding of Mediterranean tectonics, Roman geology and archeology, and the establishment of magnetostratigraphic correlations.

== Big History ==
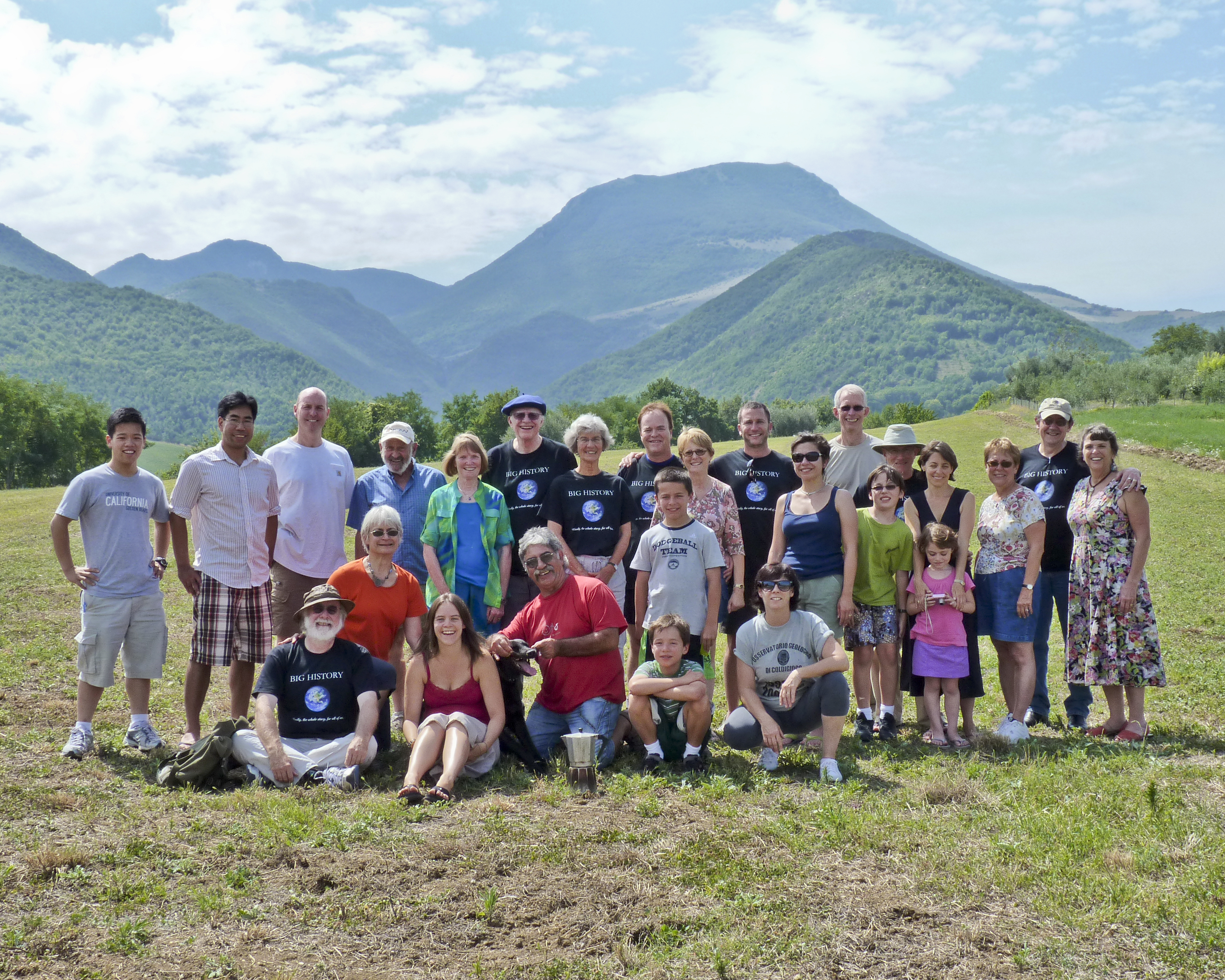
Alvarez helped to organize a meeting of Big Historians at the Geological Observatory at Coldigioco in Italy in 2010 which resulted in the establishment of the International Big History Association.

Alvarez began teaching a course in Big History at UC Berkeley in 2006 under the title "Big History: Cosmos, Earth, Life, Humanity." He last taught the course in 2011 where it was videotaped and made freely available online. According to Alvarez, Big History is the "attempt to understand, in a unified and interdisciplinary way, the history of the Cosmos, Earth, Life and Humanity." This definition was later adopted by the International Big History Association (IBHA). Alvarez's course is open to all majors and grade levels and seeks to provide a broad understanding of the past, present and future.

Alvarez helped organize a meeting of Big Historians at the Geological Observatory at Coldigioco in Italy in 2010, which resulted in the establishment of the International Big History Association. In 2011, the IBHA is a 501(c)3 non-profit organization.

Alvarez was one of the founding members of the IBHA, and served on the advisory board until August 7, 2014 when he stepped down at the 2014 IBHA conference held at Dominican University of California.

=== ChronoZoom ===
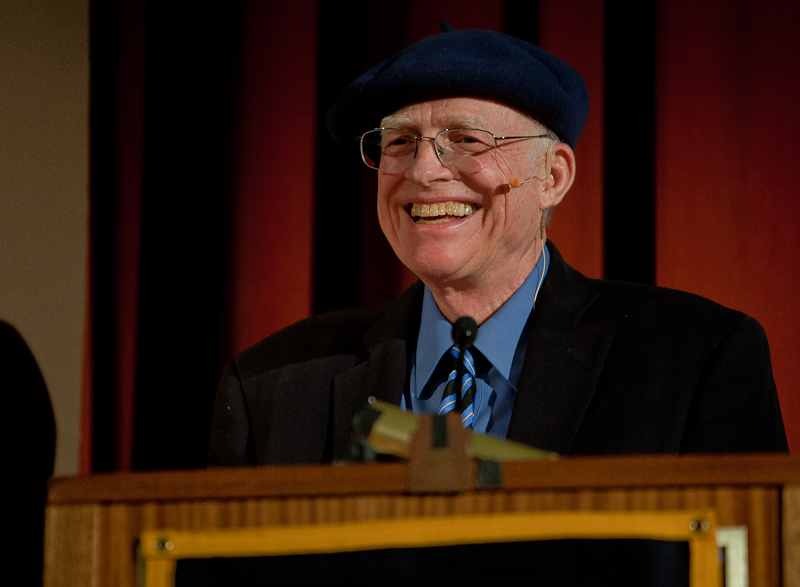
Alvarez presented "Earth History in the Broadest Possible Context" at Chevron Auditorium on the UC Berkeley campus where ChronoZoom 2.0 was first publicly demonstrated in 2012.

In partnership with Microsoft Research, Alvarez developed a zoomable timeline called ChronoZoom, which is a computer-graphical approach to visualizing and understanding time scales, and presenting vast quantities of historical information in a useful way. ChronoZoom was introduced at the 97th Annual Faculty Research Lecture at UC Berkeley.

== Awards and honors ==
Alvarez was elected a Fellow of the American Academy of Arts and Sciences in 1983, and elected a member of the National Academy of Sciences in 1991. He was awarded the 2006 Nevada Medal, the 2008 Vetlesen Prize, and the Penrose Medal from the Geological Society of America. In 2005, he received the doctorate "Honoris Causa" in Geological Sciences from the University of Siena, Italy.

Minor planet 3581 Alvarez is named after him and his father, Luis Walter Alvarez.

== Works ==
- T. rex and the Crater of Doom (Princeton University Press, 1997) ISBN 0-375-70210-5
- The Mountains of Saint Francis: The Geologic Events that Shaped Our Earth. W. W. Norton. 2008. ISBN 9780393061857 – via Internet Archive.
- A Most Improbable Journey: A Big History of our Planet and Ourselves (W. W. Norton, 2016) ISBN 978-0393292695
