= Frank Asaro =

American scientist (1927–2014)

- Frank Asaro
- Born: July 31, 1927; San Diego, California
- Died: June 10, 2014 (aged 86); El Cerrito, California
- Education: University of California, Berkeley
- Children: 4, including Catherine Asaro
- Scientific career
- Fields: Nuclear Chemistry
- Workplaces: University of California, Berkeley
- Doctoral advisor: Isadore Perlman

Frank Asaro (born Francesco Asaro, July 31, 1927 – June 10, 2014) was an Emeritus Senior Scientist at the Lawrence Berkeley National Laboratory associated with the University of California at Berkeley. He is best known as the chemist who discovered the iridium anomaly in the Cretaceous–Paleogene boundary layer that led the team of Luis Alvarez, Walter Alvarez, Frank Asaro, and Helen Michel to propose the Asteroid-Impact Theory, which postulates that an asteroid hit the Earth sixty-five million years ago and caused mass extinction during the age of the dinosaurs.

== Biography ==
Asaro grew up in Escondido, California, the son of avocado farmer and barber Nicolo Asaro and Antonina (Annie) Asaro. He married Lucille Marie Lavezo and settled in the California Bay Area. They had four children, Frank, Antonina, Catherine, and Marianna. Asaro's mother, one of the oldest known residents of Escondido, lived until almost 106 years old.

== Research ==
=== The Early Berkeley Years ===
Asaro went to college at age sixteen during World War II and earned both his undergraduate and Ph.D. degrees in chemistry from the University of California, Berkeley. For his doctorate, he worked with Professor Isadore Perlman on alpha decay processes in nuclear chemistry. Asaro and Perlman collaborated over the next fourteen years on studies of nuclear structure. It was during this time that they developed a high-precision technique of neutron activation analysis that has become a standard for determining the origin of ancient artifacts, in particular pottery. Asaro initially agreed to work on the project for a few months. He later wrote, "How good was Perlman at choosing new fields? I thought I would take three months off to do this. I made that decision in 1967, and I'm still doing this work 32 years later."

One of the first projects Asaro tackled with Perlman was a study of ancient pottery from Cyprus, known as Cypriot Bichrome ware. Aided by the Swedish archaeologist Einar Gjerstad, they obtained 1,200 pottery sherds from the second millennium BCE excavated by the Swedish Cyprus Expedition in 1927–1931. Among the many results of those studies was the work done with Michal Artzy, a then graduate student at Brandeis. Up until that time, a distinctive type pottery called "Bichrome Ware", first found in Tel Ajjul in Palestine by the archaeologist Sir Flinders Petrie, was believed to originate in Palestine after which it was exported to sites in the eastern Mediterranean. Thrown on a fast wheel and painted with animals and birds, the unusual pottery appeared to be the work of a new painter or school of painting. The Berkeley group showed that in fact the chemical composition of the pieces matched that of pottery made in Cyprus, which meant it had later been exported to Palestine and other sites, a result that had extensive ramifications on the archaeology of the eastern Mediterranean.

=== The Colossi of Memnon ===
In 1973, Asaro and his colleagues embarked on a study of the Colossi of Memnon, two statues of Pharaoh Amenhotep III that have stood for 3400 years in the Theban necropolis, across the River Nile from the modern city of Luxor. Collaborating with Professor Robert Heizer and his research group in the Department of Anthropology and Archaeological Research at the University of California, Berkeley, the Asaro group analyzed the stone used to construct the statues. Erected in the early 14th century BCE as guardians of the Mortuary Temple, the two 50-foot monoliths consist of a quartzose sandstone rock (quartzite) formed by quartz particles cemented with iron oxide. Archeologists had once believed that all the stone used to create the statues came from a quarry about 100 miles (160 km) away from the temple site, near Aswan. Asaro's group determined that the original rock used to build the statues actually came from quarries 420 miles away in Cairo, Egypt and was transported overland to the final site, a remarkable feat of engineering for that time. Using neutron activation analysis, Asaro and his co-workers showed that the stone from Aswan was only used to repair the upper half of the northern statue, which had been knocked over in an earthquake about 27 bce and reconstructed by Roman emperor Septimius Severus about 197 CE.

=== The Plate of Brass ===
The Plate of Brass, also known as Drake's Plate, is an artifact that English explorer Francis Drake purportedly left on the coast of what is now Marin County, in the San Francisco Bay Area of California, after his ship the Golden Hinde landed there in 1579. However, in 1977, Asaro and his colleague Helen Michel used neutron activation analysis to determine that the zinc content in the composition of the plate was too high and the impurity levels too low to come from techniques of sixteenth century English for working with brass. Instead, the plate was mostly likely manufactured in the first half of the nineteenth century or later.

=== The Asteroid Impact Theory ===
Asaro is best known as the nuclear chemist who discovered the iridium anomaly that led to the development of the asteroid impact theory to explain the mass extinctions, including the demise of the dinosaurs, that occurred at the end of the geological era known as the Cretaceous period in Earth's history. His part in the work began when Nobel Prize–winning physicist Luis Alvarez and his son, geologist Walter Alvarez, asked Asaro to look for iridium in samples of earth from the layer between the Cretaceous and Paleogene periods. Their purpose was to discover if the composition of the boundary layer that represented the transition between those two periods could provide insight into how many years the layer represented.

Asaro told the Alvarezes that the amount of iridium present in such samples of the Earth would almost certainly be too small to detect. However, he was interested in the project and agreed to perform the analysis, working with colleague Helen Michel. When they discovered remarkably high levels of iridium, he believed they had done the analysis incorrectly. He and Michel repeated the tests many times before bringing their results to Alvarez. Walter Alvarez has written, "Frank hunts down potential mistakes with the ruthlessness of a counterspy, triple checks everything, and then checks it again .... We know today what killed the dinosaurs because of Frank Asaro's ability to make these remarkable measurements." The results were soon confirmed, not only for the samples provided by Alvarez, but independently by other groups around the world. That discovery resulted in the group, led by Luis Alvarez, to propose that an asteroid collided with the Earth and caused the mass extinctions. Although the theory is sometimes referred to as the Alvarez hypothesis, the seminal paper published in the literature was authored by Luis Alvarez, his son Walter, Frank Asaro, and Helen Michel.

The theory was initially met with skepticism, but over the years has become accepted as the primary explanation of the mass extinctions that took place sixty-five million years ago. Asaro himself felt that while mass extinction of many species was well-supported by plentiful fossil records, the smaller number of dinosaur fossils available worldwide made pinpointing cause of their extinction more difficult. In the March 5, 2010, edition of Science, an international panel of experts in geology, paleontology and related fields published the results of their exhaustive review of the data, ruling in favor of the asteroid theory.

== Legacy ==
Minor planet 4531 Asaro is named in his honor.

In 2006, Asaro transferred archives of his work to the University of Missouri Research Reactor Center with the request that they transcribe these data and share them with the scientific community. After more than a decade, a (nearly) comprehensive archive of the work of Asaro, Perlman, and Michel on the geochemistry of archaeological and geological samples was produced by Matthew T. Boulanger. This archive was provided to the scientific community via the Digital Archaeological Record (tDAR). The knowledge and experiences gained through working with these records has been used to recommend best practices to modern laboratories producing similar data to ensure that they remain useful into the future.
