= 298 Baptistina =

Main-belt asteroid

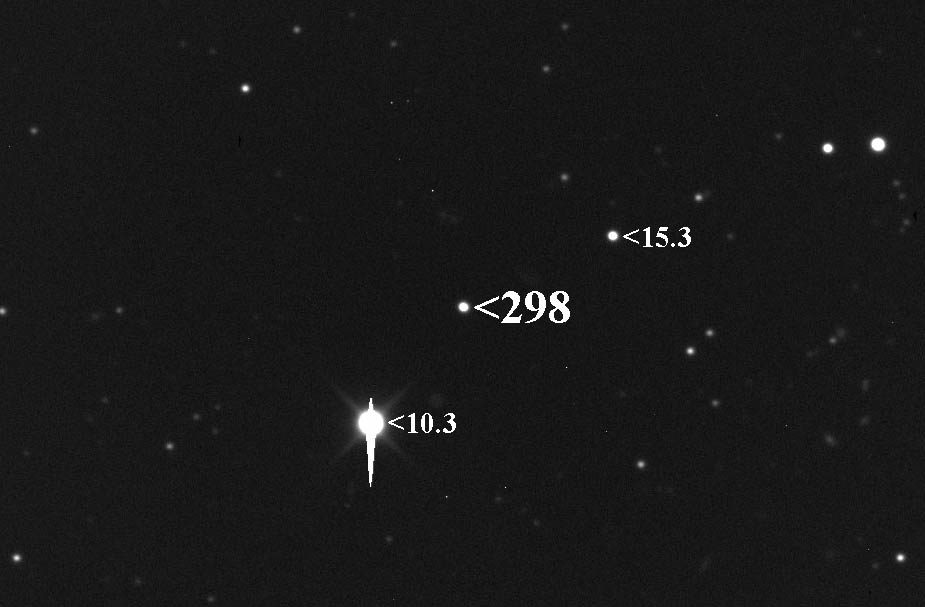
- Asteroid 298 Baptistina (apparent magnitude 15.2) near a mag 15.3 star

Discovery
- Discovered by: Auguste Charlois
- Discovery site: Nice, France
- Discovery date: 9 September 1890

Designations
- Alternative designations: A890 RB
- Minor planet category: Main belt; Baptistina family

Orbital characteristics
- Epoch 21 November 2025 (JD 2461000.5)
- Uncertainty parameter 0
- Observation arc: 123.99 years
- Aphelion: 2.480 AU
- Perihelion: 2.049 AU
- Semi-major axis: 2.264 AU
- Eccentricity: 0.09513
- Orbital period (sidereal): 3.407 years
- Mean anomaly: 113.57°
- Mean motion: 0° 17^{m} 21.588^{s} / day
- Inclination: 6.279°
- Longitude of ascending node: 8.112°
- Argument of perihelion: 134.99°
- Earth MOID: 1.065 AU
- Jupiter MOID: 2.525 AU
- T_{Jupiter}: 3.604

Physical characteristics
- Dimensions: 13–30 km (8.1–18.6 mi)
- Synodic rotation period: 16.23±0.02 hours
- Geometric albedo: 0.131
- Spectral type: X-type
- Absolute magnitude (H): 11.2

298 Baptistina is an asteroid orbiting in the asteroid belt. It is the namesake of the Baptistina family. It was discovered on 9 September 1890 by Auguste Charlois of Nice. The source of its name is unknown. It measures about 13–30 km (8.1–18.6 mi) in diameter. Although it has an orbit similar to the Flora family asteroids, it was once considered a possible source of the impactor that caused the extinction of the dinosaurs, a possibility ruled out by the Wide-field Infrared Survey Explorer (WISE) in 2011.

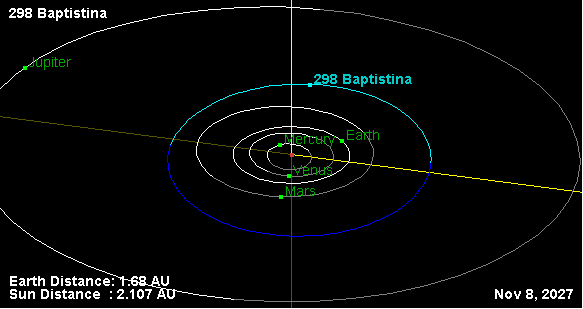
Orbit of Baptistina
