= Helen Vaughn Michel =

American chemist

- Born: 1932 (age 93–94)
- Education: University of California, Berkeley, Indiana University
- Scientific career
- Fields: Nuclear Chemistry
- Workplaces: University of California, Berkeley

Helen Vaughn Michel (born 1932) is an American chemist best known for her efforts in fields including analytical chemistry and archaeological science, and specific processes such as neutron activation analysis and radiocarbon dating. Her work with Frank Asaro at the Lawrence Berkeley National Laboratory at the University of California (Berkeley) is particularly noteworthy as it includes the dating of Drake's Plate of Brass as well as the Alvarez hypothesis, the hypothesis that posits the Cretaceous–Paleogene extinction event.

Michel retired from the Lawrence Berkeley National Laboratory in 1990.
