= Assyrian conquest of Aram =

C. 856–732 BCE military campaigns in West Asia

Date	796 BC
Location	Aram
Result	Assyrian victory
Territorial changes	Aram became part of the province of Eber-Nari

Belligerents
Neo-Assyrian Empire	Aramean states

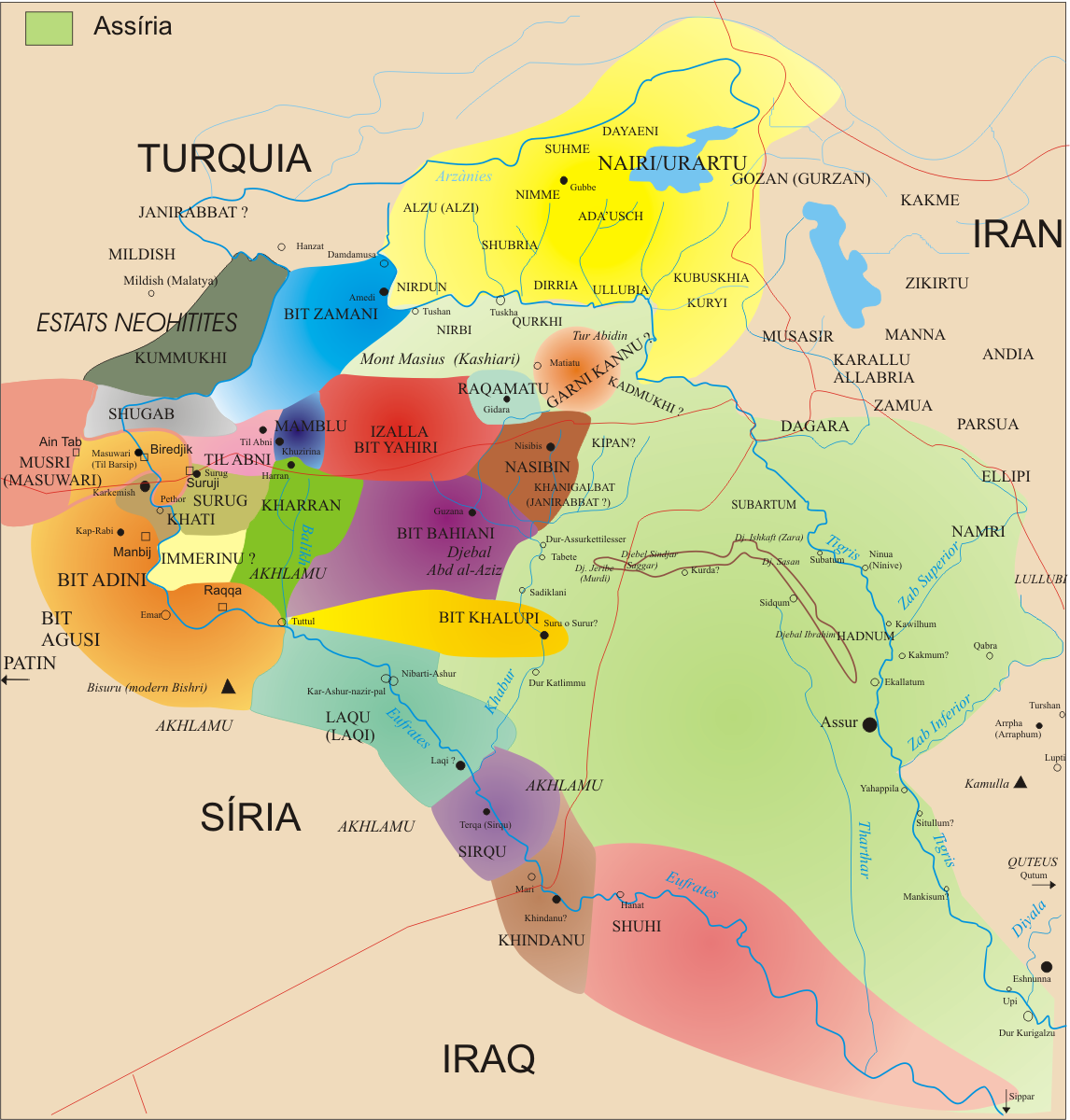
Aramean states in Upper Mesopotamia during the 9th century BCE, with neighboring Assyria (green) and Urartu (yellow)

The Assyrian conquest of Aram (c. 856 – 732 BCE) refers to the series of military campaigns and annexations by the Neo-Assyrian Empire (911–605 BCE) that brought the independent Aramean states (roughly modern-day Syria in the Levant) under Assyrian control. Most of the northwestern Aramean states were also Neo-Hittite states. In the Neo-Assyrian Empire's administrative terminology, the conquered territories west of the Euphrates were incorporated into the province of Eber-Nari ('Beyond the River, i.e. the Euphrates'). These campaigns marked the end of Aram's political independence.

== Background ==
Following the Late Bronze Age collapse, the Arameans quickly came to dominate much of the Levantine inland. They formed Aramean states, a patch network of small kingdoms throughout Syria and Upper Mesopotamia, bringing them into direct contact and threat with the civil war-ridden Middle Assyrian state.

These Aramean states included: Aram-Damascus, Hamath, Bit Adini, Bit Bahiani, Bit Hadipe, Aram-Bet Rehob, Aram-Zobah, Bit-Zamani, Bit-Halupe and Aram-Ma'akah, as well as the Aramean tribal confederations of the Gambulu, Litau and Puqudu in the region of Babylon. Most of the northwestern Aramean states were also Neo-Hittite states (states following the Hittite imperial tradition).

On other hand, along the Mediterranean coast in modern day Lebanon, Phoenician city states such as Tyre, Sidon, Arwad, Beirut, Simyra, Onoba and Tarshish managed to survive the collapse and flourished in maritime trade across the Mediterranean Sea. Further east the Sutean, Aramean and Arab tribes formed confederations in the Syrian Desert and the Middle Euphrates region.

Further south in the region of modern day Israel and Jordan were Hebrew and Canaanite-speaking Biblical kingdoms of Israel, Judah, Ammon, Edom and Moab. There was also the Arab tribe of the Qedarites. In addition, the region of the modern day Gaza Strip was settled by the Philistines, who originated in the Aegean sea.

== Assyrian conquest ==
The Neo-Assyrian Empire begins with the accession of Adad-nirari II in 911 BCE. He drove Arameans from Assyrian territory in Tur-Abdin, the Khabur Delta, Jazira, the Kashiari mountains, Amid (modern Diyarbakir) and Mérida (modern Mardin) thus securing the borders of Assyria proper.

Large scale invasion began with the conquests of Ashurnasirpal II (883–859 BCE) who secured large swathes of eastern and northern Aram for Assyria, then advanced to the Mediterranean, forcing tribute upon the Phoenician city states of the coast.

Shalmaneser III (859–824 BCE) continued the trend, conquering Bit Adini in 856 BCE and driving the Neo-Hittites from Carchemish. In attempt to halt Assyrian expansion, a huge coalition of nations united to oppose the Assyrian king, this alliance included not just the Aramean, Phoenician, Neo-Hittite and Sutean kingdoms and tribes of the region, but also the Babylonians, Egyptians, Elamites, Israelites and Arabs (the first mention of Arabs in historical record). This array of nations confronted the Assyrian army the Battle of Qarqar in 853 BCE, however they failed to defeat Shalmaneser III and the Assyrian king was then able to pick off his enemies individually over the next few years, and by the end of his reign most of the Levant was either under direct Assyrian rule or paying tribute.

However, during the reign of Shamshi-Adad V (823–811 BCE) and queen Semiramis (811–806 BCE) further expansion in Aramea was largely suspended due to instability in Assyria itself.

When Adad-nirari III (811–783 BCE) ascended the throne, he resumed vigorous Assyrian expansion in all directions. In 796 BCE he conquered Aram-Damascus, an event which it never truly recovered from.

Shalmaneser IV (783–773 BCE), Ashur-dan III (772–755 BCE) and Ashur-nirari V (754–745 BCE) maintained Assyrian possessions, but were unable to expand much further due to power struggles with their own nobles and generals.

However, in 744 BCE Tiglath-Pileser III (744–727 BCE) ascended the throne and conquered the entirety of the Levant, and in 732 BCE, he destroyed the kingdom of Aram-Damascus forever in the process.

Aram became part of the province of Eber-Nari ('Beyond the River, i.e. the Euphrates') and, as such, remained a part of the Neo-Assyrian Empire until the latter's collapse in 612 BCE, although some northern parts of the region remained under the control of the remnants of the Assyrian army and administration until 599 BCE.

Subsequently much of the region fell to the short-lived Neo-Babylonian Empire (612–539 BCE), and eventually became a satrapy of the Achaemenid Empire (539–332 BCE). The Seleucid Empire (312–150 BCE) would later succeed the Achaemenid Persians.

The fact that Aram had long been ruled by Assyria led the Greeks to label the land Syria, which was originally an apheretic form of Assyria. Over time, Syria came to denote the broader Levant, while Assyria referred to Mesopotamia. Herodotus (5th century BCE) was among the earliest Greek authors to consistently distinguish Syria and Assyria. After his time, some classical writers occasionally blurred the distinction. Nevertheless, educated writers and administrative usage gradually preserved the distinction, with Syria referring to the Levant and Assyria to Mesopotamia.

== See also ==
- Assyrian conquest of Neo-Hittite states

== Sources ==
- Joseph, John (2000). The modern Assyrians of the Middle East. Brill.
