= Isadore Perlman =

Nuclear chemist (1915–1991)

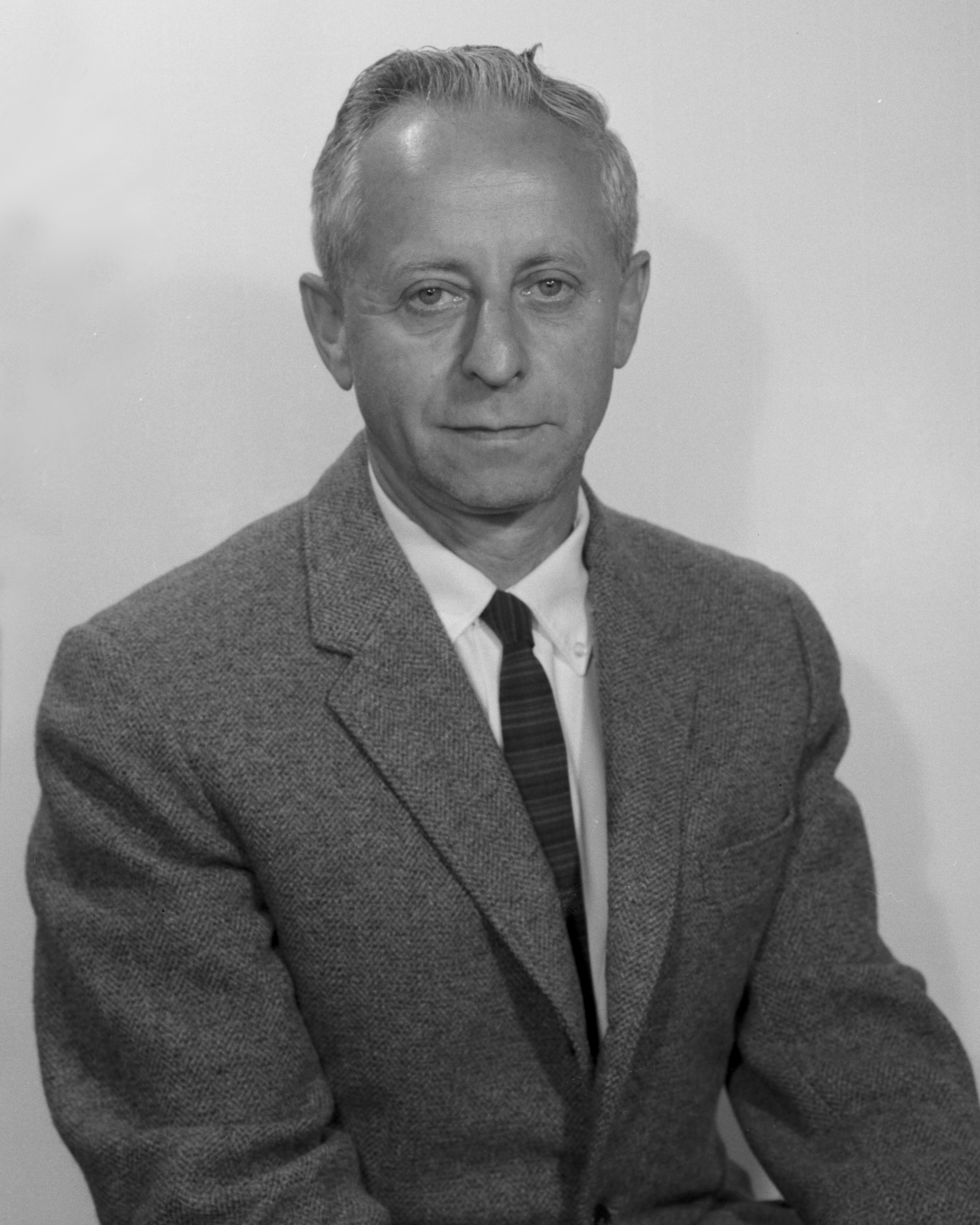
- Perlman in 1964
- Born: April 12, 1915
- Died: August 3, 1991 (aged 76)
- Known for: Research on alpha decay
- Scientific career
- Fields: Nuclear chemistry

Isadore Perlman (April 12, 1915 – August 3, 1991) was an American nuclear chemist noted for his research of Alpha particle decay. The National Academy of Sciences called Perlman "a world leader on the systematics of alpha decay". He was also recognized for his research of nuclear structure of the heavy elements. He was also noted for his isolation of Curium, as well as for fission of tantalum, bismuth, lead, thallium and platinum. Perlman discovered uses of radioactive iodine and phosphorus for medical purposes. He played a key role in Manhattan Project's plutonium production.

== Neutron activation analysis ==
He was also a top expert in the field of archaeometry. He pioneered high-precision methods of neutron activation analysis at the Lawrence Berkeley Laboratory in the US. Neutron activation analysis helps to determine the origin of ancient pottery and other artifacts through the analysis of the clay from which they were made. He was helped in the project by another noted scientist Frank Asaro. Second millennium BC pottery known as Cypriot Bichrome ware was one of the first archaeological projects that Perlman and Asaro undertook.

== Recognition ==
Perlman was a member of the National Academy of Sciences, a member of the American Academy of Arts and Sciences, a member of the Danish Royal Academy, chairman of the Department of Chemistry of the University of California, Berkeley, head of the Nuclear Chemistry Division and an associate director of the Lawrence Radiation Laboratory.

== Legacy ==
In 2006, Perlman's former student and collaborator Frank Asaro transferred archives of their work at Lawrence Berkeley National Laboratory to the University of Missouri Research Reactor Center with the request that they transcribe these data and share them with the scientific community. After more than a decade, a (nearly) comprehensive archive of the work of Asaro, Perlman, and Michel on the geochemistry of archaeological and geological samples was produced by Matthew T. Boulanger. This archive was provided to the scientific community via the Digital Archaeological Record (tDAR). The knowledge and experiences gained through working with these records has been used to recommend best practices to modern laboratories producing similar data to ensure that they remain useful into the future.

== Notable awards ==
- 1939 Rosenberg Fellowship
- 1940 Upjohn Research Fellowship
- 1952 California Section Award, American Chemical Society
- 1955 Guggenheim Fellow
- 1960 Ernest O. Lawrence Award, Atomic Energy Commission
- 1963 Guggenheim Fellow
- 1964 American Chemical Society Award for Nuclear Applications in Chemistry

== Chronology ==
- April 12, 1915 born in Milwaukee, Wisconsin
- 1936: BS, University of California, Berkeley (Chemistry)
- 1940: PhD, University of California, Berkeley (Physiology)
- 1936–1937: Paraffin Company, Inc., Control Chemist
- 1940–1941: University of California, Berkeley, Upjohn Fellow
- 1942–1943: Manhattan Project, Chicago Metallurgical Laboratory, Researcher
- 1943–1944: Manhattan Project, Oak Ridge Clinton Laboratory, Senior Chemist
- 1944–1945: Manhattan Project, Hanford Engineering Works (GE), Senior Chemist
- 1945–1974: University of California, Berkeley, Associate Professor to Professor of Chemistry
- 1963: elected to National Academy of Sciences
- 1974–1988: Hebrew University, Professor of Archeology and Chemistry
- 1988–1991: Lawrence Berkeley National Laboratory, Researcher
- August 3, 1991 died in Los Alamitos, California
