= Cypriot Bichrome ware =

Type of Late Bronze Age and Iron Age pottery

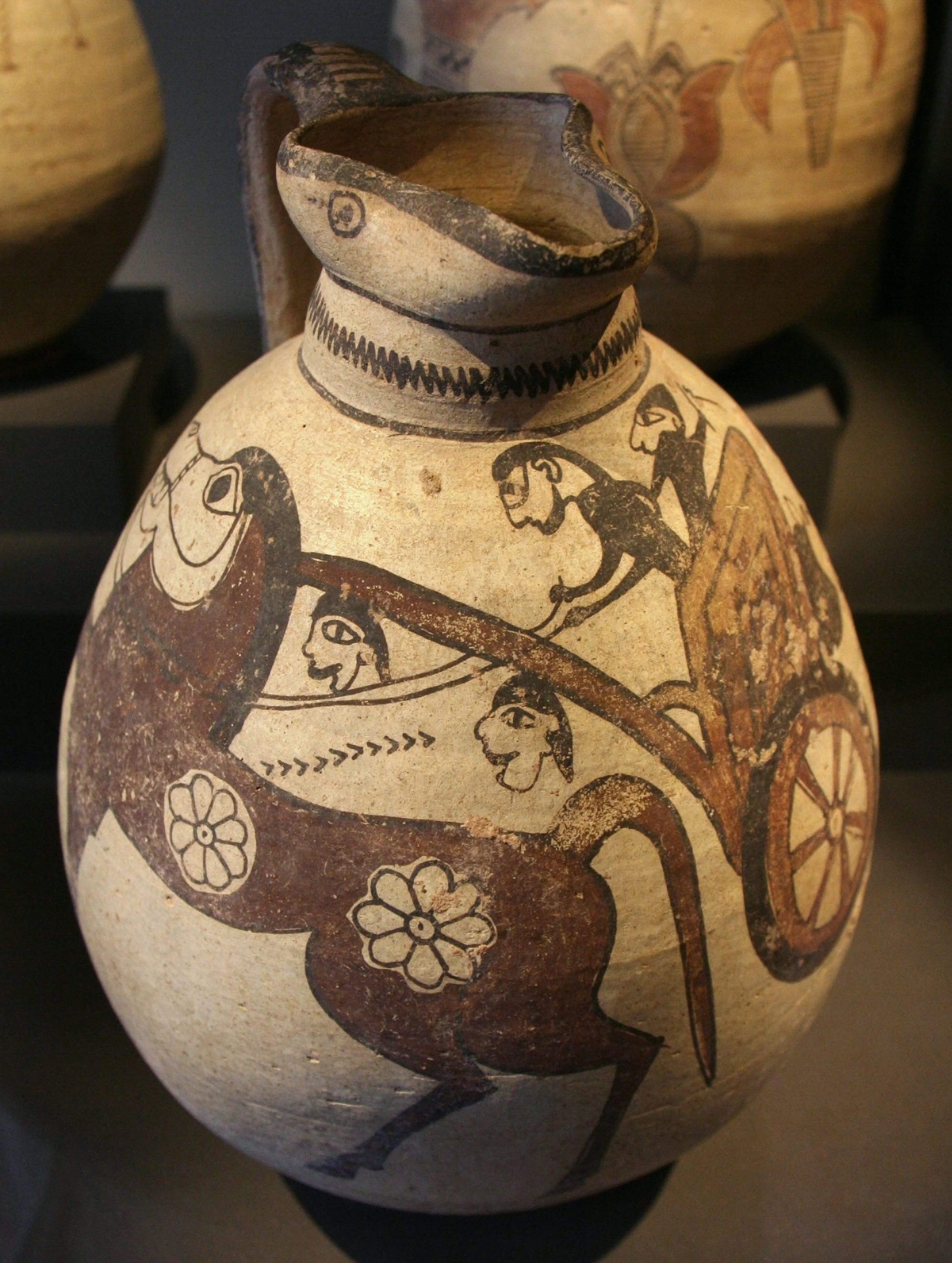
Jug with Scenic Decoration, 8th-6th centuries BC. Neues Museum, Berlin

Cypriot Bichrome ware is a type of Late Bronze Age, and Iron Age, pottery that is found widely on Cyprus and in the Eastern Mediterranean. This type of pottery is found in many sites on Cyprus, in the Levant, and also in Egypt. It was typically produced on a pottery wheel. A large variety of decorations and motifs are attested. This pottery is very similar to certain types of the Mycenaean pottery from various locations.

It was originally produced on Cyprus during the Late Cypriot I period. Comparison of the fabrics indicates that it was also imitated in the Eastern Levant and in Egypt.

== Description ==
Cypriot Bichrome is characterized by its most common decoration: two black lines with a red line in between. Between those lines geometric, floral or zoomorphic decorations would often appear.

For a long time, Bichrome Ware was considered to be a key marker for the beginning of the Late Bronze Age. However, recent studies indicate a slightly earlier appearance.

A large amount of imported Cypriot bichrome ware was found at Tell Kazel, on the Syrian coast, during the excavations that began in 1985. This pottery was dated between the 14th and 12th centuries BC. The city was destroyed later during the Late Bronze Age, after which local Mycenaean ceramics, Handmade burnished ware and Grey ware, replaced the imported pottery.

The Philistine city of Ekron is another location with large amounts of such pottery (Stratum VII), among many other places along the coast.

== Chronology ==
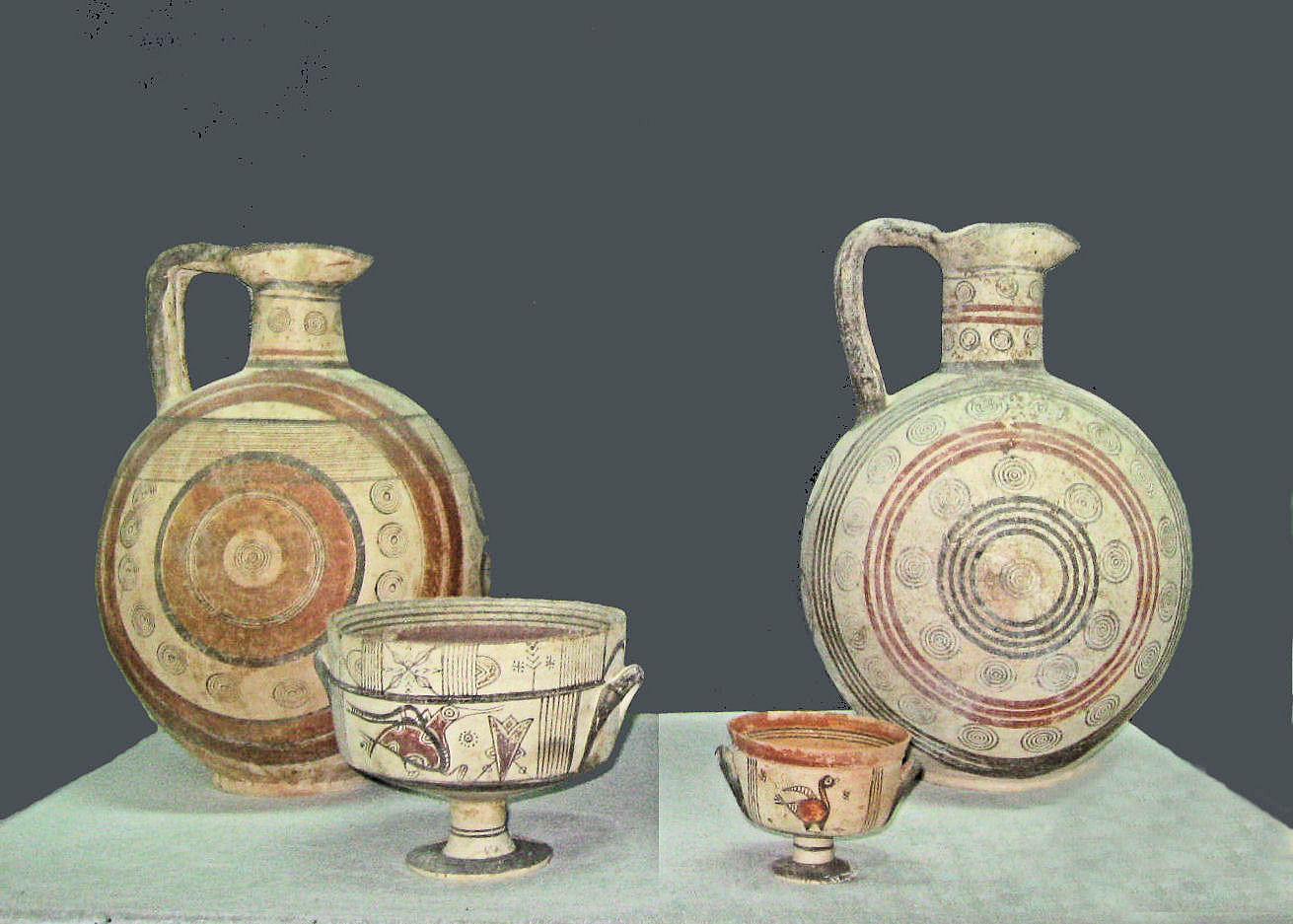
Bichrome Ware, Archaic I, 750–600 BC, from Salamis, Cyprus

The Mycenaean Greek presence in Cyprus seems to have increased especially after 1400 BC. The fall of Knossos in 1380 BC contributed to this. From that time onwards, the ports of Salamis and Kition (Larnaka) in Cyprus became big centres of trade, from which many exports went into the Levant.

The following periods are distinguished on Cyprus.

- Cypro-Geometric Period (1050–750 BC)

This is a wheel-made pottery featuring rich and symmetrical painted decoration of parallel lines, bands, concentric circles, rhombi, checked, meanders, rosettes, lotus flowers, papyruses and various other floral and geometrical motifs.

The Cypro-Geometric period is still not fully understood and is much debated. The main point of contention is the continuity between the end of the Bronze Age and the early Geometric period.

During the Cypro-Geometric I Period (1050–950 BC), the following types of pottery were produced on Cyprus other than the Bichrome: White Painted, Plain White, and Black Slip potteries.

- Archaic Period (750–475 BC)

This period is distinguished by the jugs of the free field style. They feature unique schematised bichrome type representations of bulls, birds, fishes and additional decorative forms.

- Cypro-Classical Period (475–325 BC)

A type of Bichrome pottery (Bichrome VII) was produced as late as the Cypro-Classical Period.

By this time, the artists of Cyprus were most heavily influenced by the art of mainland Greece, but Cypriot idiosyncrasies, such as the pitchers with figural spouts still existed. The human figure made more regular appearances in art than in previous ages, and sculpture became popular on large and minuscule scales.

== Scientific analysis ==
In the early 1970s, a noted nuclear scientist Isadore Perlman undertook the analysis of numerous Cypriot ceramics sent to him by the Swedish archaeologist, Einar Gherstad, when he pioneered high-precision methods of neutron activation analysis at the Lawrence Berkeley Laboratory in the US. Neutron activation analysis helps to determine the origin of ancient pottery and other artifacts through the analysis of the clay from which they were made. He was helped in the project by another noted scientist Frank Asaro.

Second millennium BC pottery from Cyprus was one of the first archaeological projects that Perlman and Asaro undertook. The project of the origin of the then assumed Second Millennium Palestinian Bichrome Ware was undertaken as part of the PhD thesis of Michal Artzy. This project was chosen because the archaeology for that period in that area was rather confused, and Perlman hoped to add some clarity to the matter.

Aided by the Swedish archaeologist Einar Gjerstad, they obtained 1,200 pottery sherds excavated by the Swedish Cyprus Expedition in 1927-31. Up until that time, the distinctive type pottery called "Bichrome Ware," first found in Tel Ajjul in Palestine by the archaeologist Sir Flinders Petrie, was believed to originate in Palestine. This pottery was very common all over the Levant. The Berkeley group showed that, in fact, the chemical composition of the pieces matched the composition of Cyprus-made pottery, which meant that these items were later exported to Palestine and other areas, a result that had extensive ramifications on the archaeology of the Eastern Mediterranean.

Thus, it was found that the fast wheel was used in Cyprus in the second millennium BC (which was not known before). Also, many types of pottery previously believed to have originated in Ras Shamra-Ugarit, now in Syria, had actually been made in Cyprus.

== See also ==
- Philistine Bichrome ware

== Bibliography ==
- Artzy, M., Asaro, F., and Perlman, I., 1973, The origin of 'Palestinian' Bichrome Ware, Journal of the American Oriental Society, 93, 446-61
- Eriksson, K.O., 1995, Egyptian amphorae from Late Cypriot contexts in Cyprus, in Trade, Contact, and the Movement of Peoples in the Eastern Mediterranean. Studies in Honour of J.Basil Hennessy, Mediterranean Archaeology Supplement 3, (eds. S. Bourke and J.P.Descœdres), 199-205, Meditarch, Sydney
- Frankel, D., and Webb, J.M., 2012, Pottery production and distribution in prehistoric Bronze Age Cyprus. An application of pXRF analysis, Journal of Archaeological Science, 39 (5),1380–87
- Hadjicosti, M., 1988, Part 1: "Canaanite" Jars from Maa-Palaeokastro, in Excavations at Maa-Palaeokastro 1979–1986, (eds. V. Karageorghis and M. Demas), 340-86, Department of Antiquities, Nicosia, Cyprus
- Knapp, A.B., and Cherry, J.F., (eds.), 1994, Provenience Studies and Bronze Age Cyprus, Production, Exchange and Politico-Economic Change, Monographs in World Archaeology 21, Prehistory Press, Madison, Wisconsin
- Merrillees, R.S. 1970. Evidence for the Bichrome Wheel-made Ware in Egypt. Australian Journal of Biblical Archaeology 1/3: 3-27.
- Mommsen, H., Beier, Th., and Åström, P., 2003, Neutron activation analysis of six Mycenean sherds from Hala Sultan Tekke, Cyprus, in Archaeology and Natural Science, Vol. 2, (ed. P.Åström), 5-10, Sävedalen
- Renson, V., Coenaerts, J., Nys, K., Mattielli, N., Åström, P., and Claeys, P., 2007, Provenance determination of pottery from Hala Sultan Tekke using lead isotopic analysis: Preliminary results, in Hala Sultan Tekke 12. Tomb 24, Stone Anchors, Faunal Remains and Pottery Provenance, Studies in Mediterranean Archaeology, 45 (12), (eds. P. Åström and K. Nys), 53-60, Paul Åströms förlag, Sävedalen.
- Renson, V.; Coenaerts, J.; Nys, K.; Mattielli, N.; Vanhaecke, F.; Fagel, N.; Claeys, P. H. (2011). "Lead Isotopic Analysis for the Identification of Late Bronze Age Pottery from Hala Sultan Tekke (Cyprus)". Archaeometry. 53: 37–57. doi:10.1111/j.1475-4754.2010.00535.x.
- Tschegg, C., Hein, I., and Ntaflos, T., 2008, State of the art multi-analytical geoscientific approach to identify Cypriot Bichrome Wheelmade Ware reproduction in the Eastern Nile delta (Egypt), Journal of Archaeological Science, 35, 1134-47.
- Tschegg, C., Ntaflos, T., and Hein, I., 2009, Integrated geological, petrologic and geochemical approach to establish source material and technology of Late Cypriot Bronze Age Plain White ware ceramics, Journal of Archaeological Science, 36, 1103–14
- Yellin, J., 2007, Instrumental neutron activation based provenance studies at the Hebrew University of Jerusalem, with a case study on Mycenaean pottery from Cyprus, Archaeometry, 49 (2), 271-88
