= Leila Badre =

Lebanese archaeologist (born 1943)

- Born: 20 February 1943 (age 83); Beirut
- Known for: Directorship of the Archaeological Museum of the American University of Beirut
- Scientific career
- Fields: Archaeology

Leila Badre (born 20 February 1943) is a Lebanese archaeologist and director of the Archaeological Museum of the American University of Beirut.

== Biography ==
Badre was born in Beirut and attended the "Dames de Nazareth" high school there. She obtained her B.A. and M.A. in Archaeology at the American University of Beirut and then went on to complete a doctorate at the University of Paris 1 Pantheon-Sorbonne. Her thesis, entitled "Anthrophomorphic figurines in Bronze Age Syria" was completed in 1976, published in 1980 and has become a reference book on the subject. She has also lectured at the Louvre, Institute of the Arab World in Paris and at several international conferences.

Between 1968 and 1975 she worked as a research assistant at the AUB Museum, from 1977 to 1979, then as a research scientist at the French Institute of Middle Eastern Archaeology (IFAPO) and later in 1992 as a consultant for the department of history and archaeology at the University of Balamand.

She has held three teaching positions; at the Lebanese University between 1978 and 1988, then as the resident lecturer at the IFAPO and guest lecturer at the University of Dijon, Bourgogne in 1989 and later as visiting professor at the École Normale Supérieure in Paris in 1991. She took her longest and most notable position as Director of the AUB Museum in 1980, where she oversaw a massive, total renovation project in 2006. She was also responsible for creating a museum in the crypt of the ruined basement of Saint George Orthodox Cathedral in the centre of Beirut.

Her interests include heritage conservation, religion, sea people, handmade burnished ware, Late Bronze and Iron Age.

== Fieldwork ==
Badre has directed several excavations in Lebanon (Tell el-Ghassil 1968–74, Sarafand 1969–74, Arqa 1978, Beirut Town Center 1993–99, Beirut St. George Cathedral 1995–2000, Kaftoun Monastery Chekka 2004–present, Tyre 2012), Syria (Ugarit 1973, Ibn-Hani 1977–79, Tell Kazel 1985–2010), Yemen (Hadramout 1979–83) and Dubai (Trucial States 1969–70).

Prominent studies include those of Tell Kazel in Syria from 1985 until present, researching ancient Sumur and its origins. She also led rescue excavations in downtown Beirut, discovering the ancient site of Biruta featured in the Amarna letters during the 14th century BC and the Phoenician site of Birôth.

== Selected bibliography ==
- Badre, Leila., Tell Kazel, Syria: excavations of the AUB Museum, 1985–1987 : preliminary reports, Faculty of Arts and Science, American University of Beirut, 124 pages, 1990.
- Badre, Leila., Breton, Jean-François., Audouin, Rémy., Wādī Ḥaḍramawt: prospections, Centre Culturel et de Recherches Archéologiques, 114 pages, 1980.
- Badre, Leila., "Le périmètre archéologique de Tyr", Tyr et la formation des civilisations méditerranéennes, Paris 1992.
- Badre, Leila., "Les peuples de la mer à Ibn Hani, problème de destruction et de ré-occupation"., Atti del I Congresso Internazionale di Studi Fenici e Punici Vol. I, Roma 1983.
- Badre, Leila., Les figurines anthropomorphes en terre cuite à l'Age du Bronze en Syrie., B.A.H., LXXXV, Paris, P. Geuthner, 1980.
- Badre, Leila., Recently Discovered Bronze Age Temples : Middle Bronze Beirut and Late Bronze Tell Kazel in Acts of the First, International Congress on the Archaeology of the Ancient Near East. Roma, 1998.
- Badre, Leila., “Cultural Interconnections During the Late Bronze Age at Tell Kazel", in Bulletin of the American School of Oriental Research (BASOR) No. 343, Baltimore., 2007.
- Badre, Leila., "Beyrouth 003 Preliminary Report, Excavations of the American University of Beirut Museum 1993–1996", in Bulletin d'Archéologie et d'Architecture Libanaises, volume 2, 1997 p. 6-94, 2007.
- Badre, Leila., Les découvertes archéologiques du Centre Ville de Beyrouth" in Comptes Rendus de l'Académie des Inscriptions, et Belles Lettres. Paris, 1997, 2007.
- Badre, Leila., "Sondage stratigraphique à Shabwa-Hadramout 1976–81", Syria, LXVIII, Paris 1991.
- Badre, Leila., “Handmade Burnished Ware and Contemporary Imported Pottery from Tell Kazel" in the Proceedings of the, International Symposium held at Rethymnon, Crete, 2002. Sea Routes…Interconnections in the Mediter. 16th-6th c. B.C., Athens, 2003.
- Badre, Leila., "The Third Preliminary Report on the Archaeological Excavations of Tell Kazel 1993–1998, BERYTUS, vol. XLIV, Beirut, 1999-2000.
