= Kazel =

Kazel may refer to:

== People ==
- Kazel Kinouchi (born 1991), Filipina-Japanese actress
- Dorothy Kazel (1939–1980), American Catholic missionary raped and murdered by the military of El Salvador

== Others ==
- Tell Kazel, an oval-shaped tell in Tartus Governorate Region, Syria
