= Aramean states =

Iron Age group of polities

Map of the Aramean states and other post-Hittite states

The Aramean states or Aramean kingdoms were an Iron Age group of Aramaic-speaking polities that arose in the northern Levant and northern Mesopotamia during the early first millennium BCE, following the collapse of major Late Bronze Age powers such as the Hittite Empire and Mitanni.

Centered in modern-day Syria, these states included kingdoms such as Aram-Damascus, Hamath, Bit Agusi, and Bit-Adini, among others. Several of the northwestern Aramean states were also Neo-Hittite states, as successors of the Hittite Empire maintaining the latter's traditions (alongside Luwian-speaking successors).

The Aramean states played a key role in the political landscape of the early Iron Age Levant until their conquest by the Neo-Assyrian Empire.

== Origins and early history ==
Quoting William Schniedewind, “the rise of the Aramean states is shrouded in darkness”. The Arameans are thought to have expanded from the Syrian steppe northward and eastward into Mesopotamia during the Late Bronze to early Iron Age, in the context of the collapse of the Hittite, Mitanni, and Egyptian spheres.

According to K. Lawson Younger Jr.,

The very designation “Arameans” masks the fact they were not a unified group, except in general terms of language; and in this, the very diversity of the Aramean tribes is reflected in the diversity of the Aramaic dialects that are encountered in the earliest Old Aramaic inscriptions. It is clear that there were numerous dynamics at work in the creation of the different Aramean polities.

"Most scholars who study the Arameans speak of their origins in terms of "tribes" and tribal leaders who took advantage of political instability in the region during certain time periods to expand their territory." "Groups of family members lived near one another, and the social structure was probably focused on the identity of a primary male figure in the family ("patriarchal") and possibly even traced its roots to some local tribal ancestor, after which the group was named (e.g., Bit Adini, Bit-Agusi, Bit-Gabbari, Bit-Hazaili; the Semitic word "Bit" means "House of," followed by the name of a founding figure)."

== List of Aramean states ==
- Southwestern Aramean states (modern central to southern Syria):
  - Aram-Zobah (location uncertain), an important political power in the 10th century BCE
  - Aram-Damascus (capital: Damascus), the best-documented Aramean kingdom, frequently mentioned in both Biblical and Assyrian sources; an important political power in the 9th and 8th centuries BCE
- Northwestern Aramean states (modern northwestern Syria) – several of them also Neo-Hittite states:
  - Bit Agusi
  - Bit-Adini
  - Hamath
- Eastern Aramean states (northern Mesopotamia and the Middle Euphrates valley):
  - Bit-Zamani
  - Bit Bahiani (capital: Tell Halaf)
  - Bit-Halupe
  - Laqe (Note: “Aramean tribe and a region on the Middle Euphrates”.)

== Relations with neighbors ==
The expressions “All Aram” and “Upper and Lower Aram” in Sefire treaty inscriptions have been variously interpreted, but can suggest a degree of political and cultural unity among some of the polities in the area. In earlier Assyrian sources from the late 2nd millennium BCE, references are made to "the land of the Arameans", while in 1st millennium BCE references, "Aram" became a topographical term.

Biblical texts mention Aramean kingdoms, particularly Aram-Damascus, Aram-Zobah and Aram-Rehob, often in the context of their conflicts with the kingdoms of Israel and Judah. In the early 11th century BCE, much of Israel came under foreign rule for eight years according to the Book of Judges until Othniel defeated the forces led by Cushan-Rishathaim, who was titled in the Bible as ruler of Aram-Naharaim.

Further north, the Arameans gained possession of Neo-Hittite Hamath on the Orontes River and became strong enough to dissociate with the Indo-European-speaking Neo-Hittite states. The Arameans, together with the Edomites and the Ammonites, attacked Israel in the early 11th century BCE, but were defeated.

During the 11th and the 10th centuries BCE, the Arameans conquered Sam'al and renamed it Bit Agusi. They also conquered Til Barsip, which became the chief town of Bit Adini, also known as Beth Eden. North of Sam'al was the Aramean state of Bit Gabbari, which was sandwiched between the Luwian states of Carchemish, Gurgum, Khattina, Unqi and Tabal (region). One of their earliest semi-independent kingdoms in northern Mesopotamia was Bit-Bahiani (Tell Halaf).

== Decline and Assyrian annexation ==
In the words of Mario Liverani,

the situation of the Aramean states east of the Euphrates was very different. These states had suffered from the pressure of the Assyrian expansion, aimed at controlling the entire Mesopotamian territory, well before the mid-ninth century BC.

In 732 BCE, Tiglath-Pileser III annexed Aram-Damascus.

== Legacy ==
After the collapse of the Aramean states, Aramaic continued to be used in the region and spread as a lingua franca of the Achaemenid Empire.

In the 3rd century CE, the Aramean city Palmyra became the capital of the short-lived Palmyrene Empire.

== See also ==
- Aram (region)
- Arameans
- Aramaic
- Neo-Hittite states
- Post-Hittite states
- Iron Age Levant

== Sources ==
- Billington, Clyde E. (2005). "Othniel, Cushan-Rishathaim, and the Date of the Exodus". Beyond the Jordan: Studies in Honor of W. Harold Mare. Eugene: Wipf and Stock Publishers. pp. 117–132. ISBN 9781597520690.
- Eerdmans Dictionary of the Bible. 2000.
- Lawson Younger Jr., K. (2016). A Political History of the Arameans: From Their Origins to the End of Their Polities. Society of Biblical Literature. doi:10.2307/j.ctt1g69w78. JSTOR j.ctt1g69w78.
- Liverani, Mario (2013). The Ancient Near East: History, Society and Economy.
- Metzger, Bruce Manning; Coogan, Michael David (2004). The Oxford Guide to People & Places of the Bible.
- Sader, Hélène (2014). "History". In Herbert Niehr (ed.). The Aramaeans in Ancient Syria. Leiden: Brill. pp. 11–36. ISBN 9789004229433.
- Schniedewind, William M. (2003). "The Rise of the Aramean States". Mesopotamia and the Bible.
