= Archaeological Museum of the American University of Beirut =

Archaeology Museum of the American University of Beirut
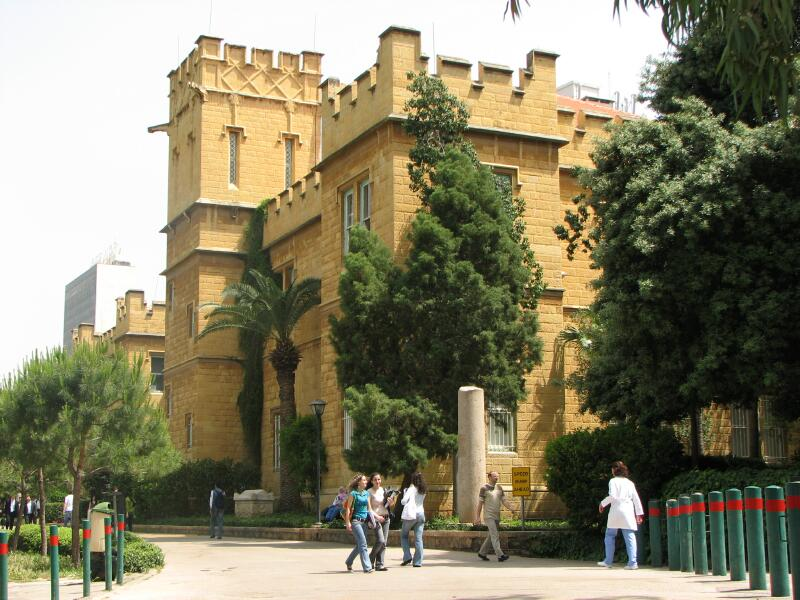

- Location within Beirut Location within Lebanon
- Established: 1868
- Location: Beirut, Lebanon
- Coordinates: 33.899458°N 35.483642°E
- Type: Archaeological
- Director: Nadine Panayot
- Curators: Reine Mady (Museum Assistant); Aimée Bou Rizk (Museum Assistant); Amale Feghali (Administrative Assistant); Najla Ataya (Administrative Assistant)
- Website: www.aub.edu.lb/museum_archeo/Pages/index.aspx

The Archaeology Museum of the American University of Beirut in Beirut, Lebanon is the third oldest museum in the Near East after Cairo and Constantinople.

== History ==
The Archaeological Museum of the American University of Beirut (AUB Archaeological Museum) was formed in 1868, after Luigi Palma di Cesnola gifted a collection of Cypriot pottery to the newly formed American University of Beirut. Georges Post was the first curator of this collection and Morris Jesup donated the funds for construction of Post Hall (pictured) which opened in 1902. There was much archaeological plundering in Lebanon due to weak governmental control, and people arrived daily at the museum with suggested artefacts plundered from clandestine excavations. Between 1902 and 1938 the museum acquired collections from all around the Middle East. The museum remained closed during World War II and re-opened in 1948. It expanded in the 1950s and doubled its floor space with a refurbishment under curator Dimitri Baramki, which opened to the public in 1964. The museum remained open during the years of crisis in Lebanon between 1975 and 1990 and underwent another complete renovation in 2006 under past director, Leila Badre. A mezzanine level was added that increased the space by one fifth using funds secured from the Joukowsky Family Foundation. Under current Curator Nadine Panayot, since September 1, 2020, the museum is entering a new digital era and undertaking major restoration work following the August 4th blast of Beirut. The AUB Archaeological Museum is the third oldest museum in the Near East, after Cairo and Constantinople

== Displays ==
The collections are organized by chronology and themes, with displays along the sides of the gallery displaying the evolution of pottery. Other displays include the Cesnola Collection, showing pottery from Cyprus from the Bronze Age to the Roman era. The prehistoric collection includes Paleolithic and Neolithic eras. The Ksar Akil collection was donated by the University of Boston team who excavated this archaeological site in 1948. The display shows a 23 metres (75 ft) stratigraphic sequence of thirty seven layers and flint tools belonging to several cultures. The sequence is radiocarbon dated between 50,000 and 18,000 BP, and contained a human jaw dated to 40,000 BP and a complete skull dated to 35,000 BP.

The Paleolithic showcase displays the journey of man through the Stone Age, covering important events such as the discovery of fire, hunting and cave paintings. The Neolithic showcase covers the dawn of agriculture, animal domestication, the beginnings of pottery, villages and religion. The terracotta figurines collection shows their evolution from the Bronze Age to the Roman era, and their importance in the development of religion. The metal figurines collection includes mostly males and gods, used as symbols of power. The Bronze Age displays show artefacts dated between 3000 BC and 1200 BC including evidence of early writing, trade and urbanization. The Iron Age displays shows evidence of the invasions of seafaring raiders and city states during the period between 1200 BC and 400 BC. The Phoenician showcases display the extraction of purple dye from murex shells, pottery and Phoenician glass. Phoenician religion is represented by a large stelae of a priest, a throne of Astarte, libation spoons and a glass amulet. Another notable feature of this section is the Ford Mandible dating from the 5th century BC showing the earliest known example of dentistry. The Bodashtar inscription is also displayed along with an explanation of the development of the linear alphabet. The Classical period collection includes funerary reliefs from Palmyra, Egypt and the Levant, a Byzantine mosaic and collection of funerary sarcophagi displayed on the staircase leading to the mezzanine. The Islamic period displays materials from the Umayyad Period in 656 AD to the Ottoman Empire in the 19th century where glazed tiles and plates are shown. The newly added mezzanine includes table cases displaying small objects such as a collection of coins, scarabs and seals, lamps, amulets, cosmetics, jewelry, tools and weapons.

== Projects ==
The museum has been involved in archaeological research and recovery projects. In 1956–1974, the museum was involved in excavations at Tell el-Ghassil in the Beqaa Valley, an agrarian site with levels dating from 1800 to 600 BC. Some of the Iron Age material recovered is displayed in the museum including a goblet with an incised decoration of birds and ducks discovered at Tell el Yehudiyeh and dating from 1730 to 1550 BC. The goblet was found next to a skeleton and is presumed to be a funerary gift for use in the afterlife.

The museum has also carried out a number of excavations in Beirut Central District under the directorship of Leila Badre. These have included the ancient tell of Beirut, site BEY 003. The purpose of this excavation was to discover the "Biruta" of the Amarna Letters. Evidence was found of a fortification system that was constructed in the second millennium BC up to the Hellenistic period, along with the remains of a building dating back into the third millennium BC and a hoard of Egyptian objects. Another site the museum has been involved with is BEY 012, Saint Georges Cathedral of the Greek Orthodox, where excavations were carried out in 2001. Eight layers showed occupation from the Hellenistic period onwards and the remains of five, possibly six, successive churches. Another site investigated was BEY 215, the An-Nahar building, revealing six levels of occupation dating from the Persian to Byzantine eras, showing continuous inhabitation since the 4th century BC. Tell Kazel in Syria has also been excavated and studied by Leila Badre since 1985. Likely the ancient Simyra, levels from the Mameluk Period to the Bronze Age were discovered. Finds included a temple and rooms with sea shell-paved floors. Visitors to the museum can view relics such as cylinder seals, necklaces, pottery and temple offerings organized according to their site location. The museum has also embarked on the restoration of the wall paintings of Mar Sarkis and Bakhos in Kaftoun with the University of Warsaw.

== Publications ==
=== Tell el-Ghassil ===
- Baramki, D., Excavation in Coele-Syria, Archaeological News, Archaeology, pp. 141–42, 1957.
- Baramki, D., First Preliminary Report on the Excavation at Tell el Ghassil, BMB vol.16, pp. 87–102, 1961.
- Baramki, D., Second Preliminary Report on the Excavation at Tell el Ghassil, BMB vol.17, pp. 47–103, 1964.
- Baramki, D., Third Preliminary Report on the Excavation at Tell el Ghassil, BMB vol.19, pp. 29–48, 1966.
- Joukowsky, M., The Pottery of Tell el-Ghassil in the Beqa’a. A Comparative Study and Analysis of the Iron Age and Bronze Age Wares, Beirut, Lebanon, 1972.
- Doumet-Serhal, C., Les Fouilles de Tell el-Ghassil de 1972 à 1974. Etude du matériel, B.A.H-T.146, Beyrouth, Liban, 1996.

=== BEY003 ===
- Badre, L., BEY 003 Preliminary Report Excavations of the American University of Beirut Museum 1993–1996. Report from the excavations in the city center of Beirut under rehabilitation from the early 1990s, BAAL, vol.2, pp. 6–94, 1997.

=== Tell Kazel ===
- Badre, L. et al., Tell Kazel, Syria. AUB Museum Excavations 1985–1987. Preliminary Report. Berytus 38: 10–124, 1990.
- Badre, L. et al. Tell Kazel (Syrie), Rapport préliminaire sur les 4è-8è campagnes de fouilles (1988–1992). Syria 71: 259–346, 1994.
- Badre, L. et al. Tell Kazel, Syria. Excavations of the AUB Museum, 1993–1998. Third Preliminary Report. Berytus 44: 123-203 and CD ROM supplement, 1999–2000.

=== The Church of Mar Sarkis and Bakhos in Kaftoun ===
- Hélou, N., “Les fresques de Kaftoun au Liban : la cohabitation des deux traditions byzantine et orientale”. Chronos, No.20, pp. 7–32, 2009.
- Chmielewski, K. and Waliszewski, T. 2007. “The Church of Mar Sarkis and Bakhos in Kaftûn and its Wall Paintings. Report 2003-2007”. BAAL, Vol. XI, 2007, pp. 279–325.

=== Other publications ===
- Capet, E., Tell Kazel (Syrie), Rapport préliminaire sur les 9è-17è campagnes de fouilles (1993–2001) du Musée de l’Université Américaine de Beyrouth. Chantier II. Berytus 47: 63–121, 2003.
- Badre, L., Tell Kazel-Simyra: A Contribution to a Relative Chronological History in the Eastern Mediterranean during the Late Bronze Age. Bulletin of American School of Oriental Research (BASOR) 343, 45–75, 2006
- Gubel, E., Lecture in International Convention : “Urbanistica Fenicia E Punica”, Roma. February 21 – 23, 2007. Eric Gubel (Musées Royaux d’Art et d’Histoire de Bruxelles) Phoenician towns and harbours in the North: The case of Early Iron Age Amurru, 2007.
- Badre, L., and Capet, E., Les fouilles de Tell Kazel (Sumur?) in La Méditerranée des Phéniciens: special issue of Les Dossiers d’Archéologie HS-no.13: 46–49, 2007.
- Jung R. Die Mykenische Keramik von Tell Kazel (Syrien). Damaszener Mitteilungen Bd 15 Mainz. pp 147 – 218, 2006.
- Capet, E., Les Peuples des Céramiques "Barbares À Tell Kazel (Syrie). Scripta Mediterranea, Vol. XXVII-XXVIII, 2006–2007, pp. 187–207, 2006–2007.
- Badre, L., The Religious Architecture in the Bronze Age: Middle Bronze Beirut and Late Bronze Tell Kazel. in Interconnections in the Eastern Mediterranean, Lebanon in the Bronze and Iron Ages. Proceedings of the International Symposium, Beirut 2008. Hors-Série BAAL, Vol. VI, 2009, pp. 253–270, 2009.
- Mackay, D., A Guide to the Archaeological Collections in the University Museum (American University of Beirut), AUB, Beirut, Lebanon, 1951.
- Baramki, D., The Archaeological Museum of the American University of Beirut, AUB, Beirut, Lebanon, 1967.
- Baramki, D., The Coins Exhibited in the Archaeological Museum of the American University of Beirut, Centennial Publications, 1968.
- Karageorghis, V. and Badre L., Cypriote Antiquities in the Archaeological Museum of the American University of Beirut, Leventis Foundation, Nicosia, Cyprus, 2009.

=== Brochures ===
- Brochure of the Archaeological Museum of the American University of Beirut, 2006.
- Museums in Lebanon, Lebanon - Ministry of Tourism, 2009

=== Newsletter ===
- The Society of Friends of the Museum publishes a Newsletter twice a year, which gives an account of the museum's activities.

== Visitor information ==
The museum's hours are 09:00–17:00 in the winter and 08:00–15:00 in the summer, Monday through Friday. The museum is closed on public holidays and during university holidays. Tours last approximately 1 hour. Group tours and school visits can be made by appointment by e-mail to the museum assistant. Entrance and tours are free of charge.
