= Post-Hittite states =

Map of post-Hittite states, including Neo-Hittite states and non-Neo-Hittite states

The post-Hittite states were states which appeared in the ancient Near East following the collapse of the Hittite Empire. Post-Hittite states included the Neo-Hittite states (states which continued Hittite imperial tradition), and other states which were not Neo-Hittite, for example Aram-Damascus (an Aramean state) or Phrygia. The Neo-Assyrian Empire has also been labeled as post-Hittite because it flourished after the collapse of the Hittite Empire. The corresponding period is called the post-Hittite period.

== Sources ==
- Archi, Alfonso (2015). Tradition and Innovation in the Ancient Near East.
- Weeden, Mark; Ullmann, Lee Z. (2022). Hittite Landscape and Geography. Brill.
