= Burnishing (pottery) =

To polish the surface of a ceramic vessel

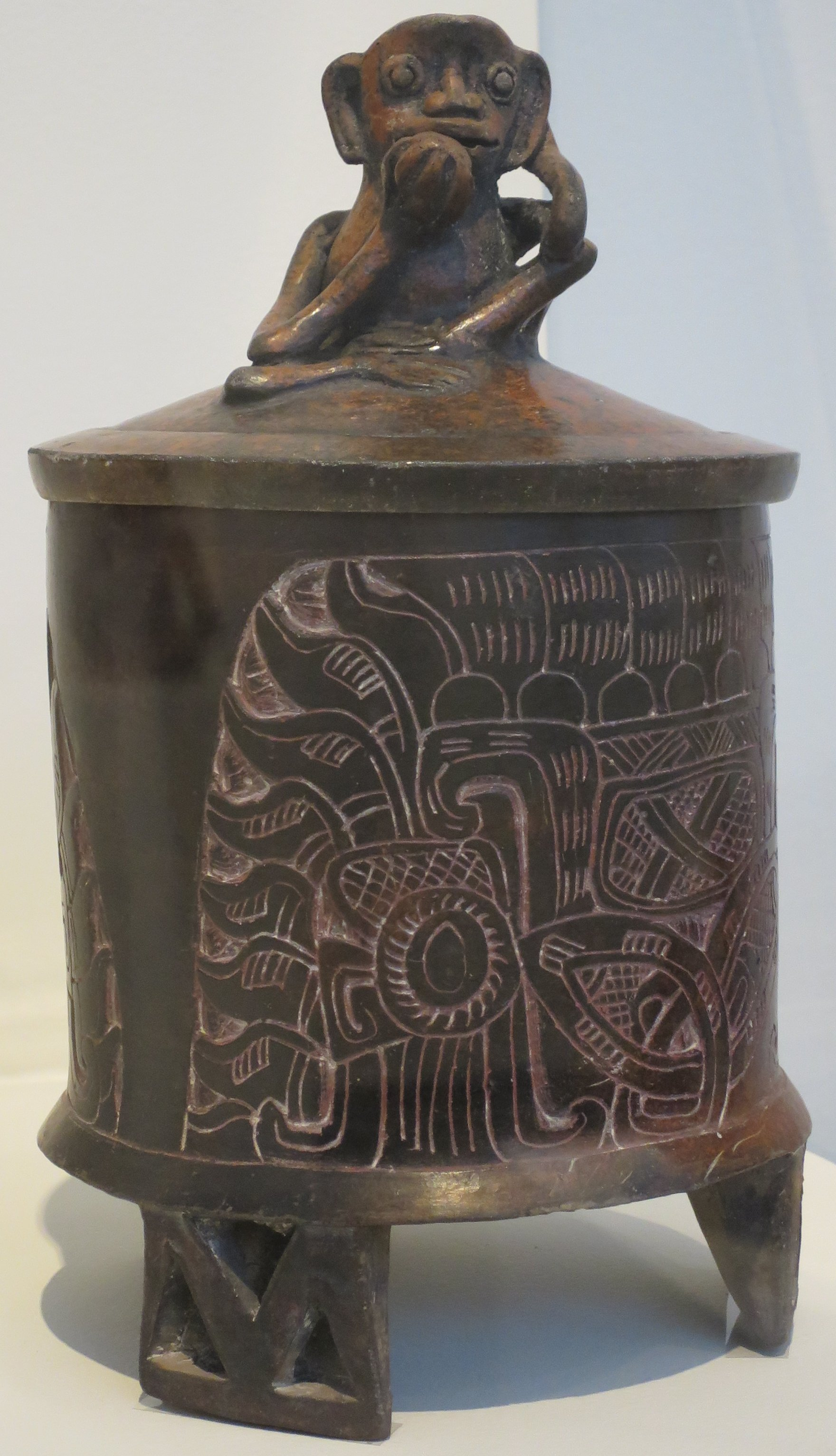
Tripod vessel with lid, Maya culture, Mexico or Guatemala, c. 4th-5th century, hand-built ceramic with incised decoration and burnished slip, Honolulu Museum of Art, accession 4183.1

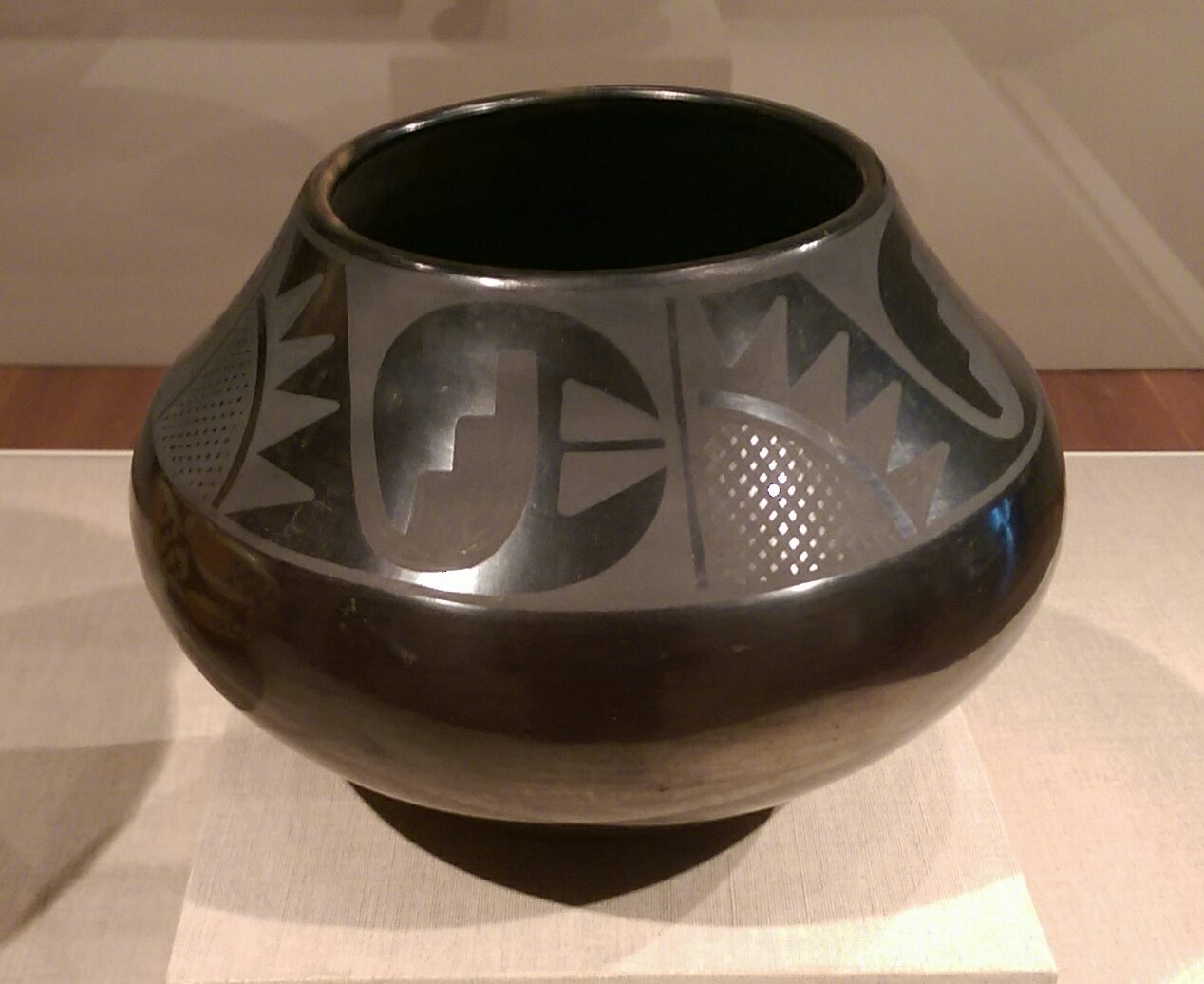
A pot by Maria Martinez, approximately 1945, at the de Young Museum in San Francisco

Burnishing is a form of pottery treatment in which the surface of the pot is polished, using a hard smooth surface such as a wooden or bone spatula, smooth stones, plastic, or even glass bulbs, while it still is in a leathery 'green' state, i.e., before firing.

== How to burnish ==
The process of burnishing pottery happens when the clay is in a “leather-hard” state. Leather-hard clay is partially dried clay that is in-between being malleable and being brittle. It is important to wet the piece before burnishing because scratch marks will be present on the surface if the clay is too dry. The direction you rub the tool on the surface can also affect the pattern produced. After firing, the surface is extremely shiny. Burnishing gives pottery a reflective surface without having to use a ceramic glaze. It is described as a low-tech way of finishing pottery because burnished pottery needs to be fired below 1832F (1000C), which is different from firing glaze. Burnishing can also be a step towards preparing pottery for pit firing, saggar firing, or raku.

This technique can be applied to concrete masonry, creating a polished finish.

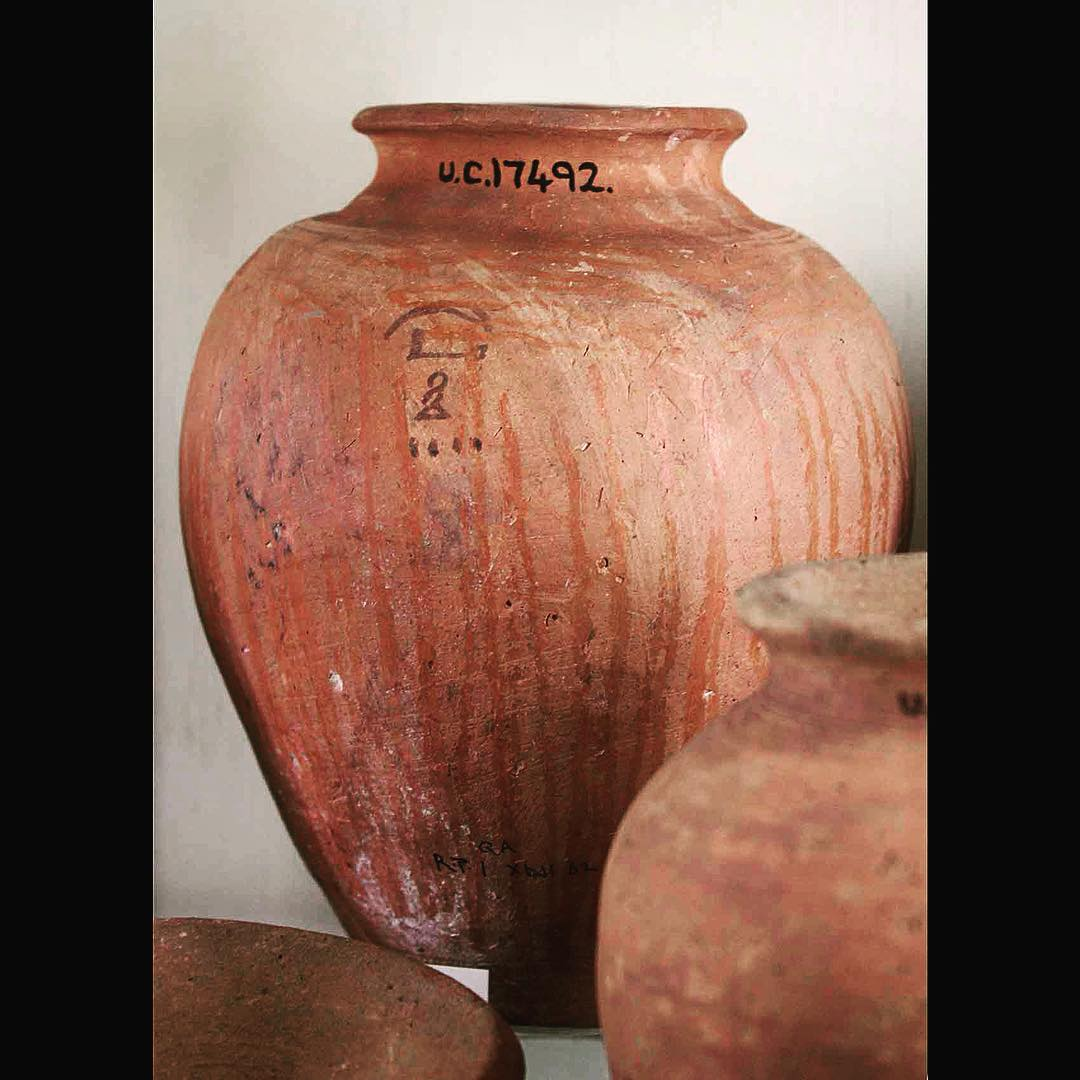
An orange burnished pot at the Petrie Museum.

Burnishing can also be applied to wood, by rubbing two pieces together along the grain. Hard woods take the treatment best. Burnishing does not protect the wood like a varnish does, but does impart a glossy sheen. As with pottery, it creates a surface that is moisture repellent, but not watertight, meaning it cannot be used for functional purposes like kitchen dishes.

== Burnishing tools ==
As mentioned, objects such as smooth stones, the back of a metal spoon, or bones are all suitable objects to burnish pottery with. Overall, the main criteria needed for a burnishing tool is for it to be smooth and easy to hold. When burnishing with stones, it is important to look out for any nicks or bumps as that will reflect on your pot with scratches. After the initial burnishing is done with your tool of choice, you can also take an additional step to make your piece shine more. This is done by wrapping your finger or thumb tightly in a piece of plastic, such as a grocery bag, and rubbing it against the pottery. Burnishing is an ancient technique that requires minimal tools, often using just the ceramist's hands and natural materials. While modern industrial tools and machinery are available, the traditional approach remains for its simplicity and tactile connection to the craft.

== See also ==
- Black-burnished ware, a type of Romano-British ceramic
- Black-on-black ware, a pottery tradition developed by Puebloan Native American ceramic artists
- Handmade Burnished Ware, a type of pottery developed in late Bronze Age Greece.
- Northern Black Polished Ware of Iron Age India
