= University of Missouri Research Reactor Center =

Nuclear research reactor

Coordinates: 38°55′54″N 92°20′31″W

The University of Missouri Research Reactor Center (MURR) is a nuclear research facility at the University of Missouri in Columbia, Missouri, United States. It houses a tank-type nuclear research reactor. As of June 2025, MURR is the most powerful university research reactor in the United States, with a thermal output of 10 megawatts. It is fueled with highly enriched uranium.

== History and overview ==
In 1955, University President Elmer Ellis appointed a committee to evaluate the feasibility of a research reactor. A construction permit was issued by the Atomic Energy Commission in November 1961. Construction began in 1963 on a former polo field, led by Ardarth Emmons. The MURR became operational on October 13, 1966.

In 1970, MURR scientist Dr. George Leddicotte gave a courtroom testimony on murder trial evidence using neutron activation analysis.

Ir-192 was produced at MURR to fight breast cancer in 1976.

In 1986, the first experiments that were performed led to the development of Quadra met and Thera Sphere, which were later approved by the U.S. Food and Drug Administration (FDA) for helping fight against bone and liver cancer respectively.

In 2016, MURR was awarded the Nuclear Historic Landmark Award from the American Nuclear Society.

As of June 2025, the University of Missouri is working on NextGen MURR, an initiative to build a new 20-megawatt reactor.

== Licensing ==
Some important reactor events are summarized here.

Year	Change
1966	Commenced operation
1974	100% power uprate
1977	More than 50% increase in operating hours, allowing the reactor to maintain over 150 hours per week of operation
2001	Original Nuclear Regulatory Commission license expired
2037	New 20-year license to expire, at which point either decommissioning or additional license extension would occur

MURR began the process to renew its operating license in 2006, and responded to requests for additional information in 2009 and 2010. On January 4, 2017, MURR was granted a renewal of the facility operating license, which allows for operation until 2037.

== Research ==
The MURR contributes to research in boron neutron capture therapy, neutron scattering and neutron interferometry, neutron transmutation doping of semiconductor materials, use of radioisotopes for imaging and treatment of cancer, epidemiology, and archaeology, along with many others.

=== Archaeometry Laboratory ===
The Archaeometry Laboratory at MURR has been funded by the National Science Foundation (NSF) since 1988. The neutron activation capabilities are used to characterize over 30 major, minor, and trace elements in archaeological and geological materials. In addition to neutron activation, the laboratory maintains and operates several X-ray fluorescence spectrometers, multiple ICP-mass spectrometers, and a multi-collector ICP-MS for isotope-ratio mass spectrometry. The laboratory is one of only a handful of facilities in the world to have access to all of these analytical methods.

Data generated by the laboratory are typically used by archaeologists to study issues relating to provenance (geological source), facilitating the understanding of trade and exchange in prehistory. The laboratory also handles analyses of geological materials in support of geology, soil science, and other environmental sciences.

=== Neutron scattering ===
The Neutron Scattering Group at MURR operates five distinct instruments for studying the structure and dynamics of matter: a triple-axis spectrometer (TRIAX), a neutron reflectometer, a scanning electron microscope, and two powder diffractometers (2XC and PSD).
