= Bit-Halupe =

Aramean state

Bit-Ḫalupe, shown in the center right

Bit-Ḫalupe, an ancient Aramean state in eastern Syria, located within the triangular area formed by the confluence of the Khabur River with the Euphrates River. It was one of the four Aramean states that bordered Assyria. The others were Bit-Zamani, Bit Bahiani and Laqe. By the ninth century BC all of them were assimilated by Assyria.

In Bit-Ḫalupe was the city of Suru (Al-Suwar). Suru was also among the cities that in 883 BC took part in the unsuccessful rebellion against the Assyrian king Ashurnasirpal II.
