= Handmade Burnished Ware =

Type of pottery found in the eastern Mediterranean near the end of the Bronze Age

Handmade Burnished Ware (also called Barbarian Ware) is a style of pottery produced during the late Bronze Age in the eastern Mediterranean. Distinct from the styles of pottery surrounding it due to its coarse construction without the potter's wheel and uneven firing, a substantial number of hypotheses have been presented to explain its presence.

== Description ==
The ware is found in Late Helladic IIIB and IIIC levels (starting in the middle of the 13th century BC), preceding the destruction of the Mycenaean citadels. Finds have placed the style of pottery across eastern Mediterranean sites including at Tiryns and at sites in Anatolia, Cyprus, and Syria. There are morphological and functional differences between the Handmade Burnished Ware found at different sites. In Epirus, most vessels are designed for consumption, while those found at the Menelaion in Laconia and at Tiryns are generally storage vessels; those found at Tiryns are often decorated, while those from other sites are not. On these grounds, Eleni Vasileiou has written that Handmade Burnished Ware should not be considered a uniform ceramic type.

Diffusionist hypotheses posit that the pottery was introduced by migrating peoples in the late 13th and 12th centuries BC. Initial diffusionist hypotheses associated its appearance with putative Dorian invaders but this is now rejected because the ware predates destruction layers associated with the Bronze Age collapse; later views still associate the ware with migratory groups in the eastern Mediterranean. Another view instead associates the ware with a small minority population present within Mycenean communities. Non-diffusionist views instead place its emergence as a local substitute for higher-quality wares unavailable amid disruptions in the Mycenaean economy.

== See also ==
- Burnishing (pottery)
- Protogeometric pottery
- Bronze Age collapse

== Bibliography ==
- Boileau, Marie-Claude; et al. (2010). "Foreign ceramic tradition, local clays: the Handmade Burnished Ware of Tell Kazel (Syria)". Journal of Archaeological Science. 37 (7): 1678–1689. doi:10.1016/j.jas.2010.01.028. ISSN 0305-4403.
- Pilides, Despina (1991). Handmade Burnished Wares of the Late Bronze Age in Cyprus (PDF) (PhD). Vol. 1. University of London.
- Rautman, M (1998). "Handmade pottery and social change: the view from late Roman Cyprus". Journal of Mediterranean Archaeology. 11: 81–104. doi:10.1558/jmea.v11i1.81.
- Vasileiou, Eleni (2018). "The Phenomenon of Handmade Burnished Ware: New data from Central Epirus, Greece". In Lamboley, Jean-Luc; Përzhita, Luan; Skenderaj, Altin (eds.). L'Illyrie méridionale et l'Épire dans l'antiquite VI [Central Illyria and Epirus in Antiquity VI]. Vol. 1. Paris: Diffusion de Boccard. pp. 101–104. ISBN 978-9928-4517-1-2 – via Academia.edu.
