= Bit-Zamani =

Former country

Bit-Zamani, shown in the center upper-right

Bit-Zamani is an ancient Aramean state in northern Mesopotamia, located within the mountainous region of Tur Abdin. In Bit-Zamani was the city of Amida (Amedu, modern Diyarbakır). It was one of the four Aramean states that bordered Assyria. The others were Bit-Halupe, Bit Bahiani and Laqe. By the ninth century BC all of them lost to Assyria.

== History ==
=== Late Bronze ===
The first time Bit-Zamani named was in Middle Assyrian texts from the beginning of the 13th century BC, originating in the city of Shibaniba (modern Tell Billa), in which Ashur-kashid, governor of Bit-Zamani was mentioned.

=== Iron Age ===
Then Bit-Zamani appears only in Neo-Assyrian sources from the beginning of the ninth century BC, from the reign of Assyrian king Tukulti-Ninurta II (890–884 BC). The king was victorious over Ammi-Ba'al, the king of Bit-Zamani, and then entered into a treaty with him, as a result of which Bit-Zamani became an ally, and in fact a vassal of Assyria. Ammi-Ba'al remained in power, but from that moment on, he had to support Tukulti-Ninurta II during his military expeditions to the Upper Tigris against the Hurrians and Urartians in Nairi. During the reign of Ashurnasirpal II (883–859 BC), son and successor Tukulti-Ninurta II, Ammi-Ba'al was murdered in 879 BC during a rebellion, which amounted to the throne Bit-Zamani named Bur-Ramman. This was met with the quick reaction from Ashurnasirpal II, who invaded Bit-Zamani, chased rebellion and killed their leader. The Assyrian king appointed Ilan, Bur-Ramman's brother, on the throne of Bit-Zamani. At first he remained obedient to the Assyrian king, but later rebelled against him, forcing Ashurnasirpal II to another expedition to Bit-Zamani in 866 BC. He attacked Ilan's stronghold Damdammusa then the capital Amedu. The result of this expedition is not known, but it appears that Bit-Zamani remained a vassal of Assyria.

In 856 BC, Shalmaneser III (858–824 BC), son and successor of Ashurnasirpal II, during one of his military expeditions, took over Bit-Zamani and annexed the territory of this state to one of the Assyrian provinces (titled Rabshakeh).

Bit-Zamani was later known under different names as province Amedu, Nairi, Sinabu or Tushhan. For example, at the end of the seventh century BC one of Assyrian officials (Limmu), Bel-iqbi mentioned in some of the sources as Governor of Bit-Zamani, while in others as Governor of Tushhan.

== Rulers ==
- Amme-ba’li (under Assurnasirpal II)
- Ilanu (under Assurnasirpal II)

== Territory ==
- Damdammusa a fortified city Assurnasirpal II takes before attacking Amedi.
- Amedi a capital city of Ilanu.
- Sinabu
- Tidu
- Tušhan
