= Timeline of Cretaceous–Paleogene extinction event research =

Research timeline

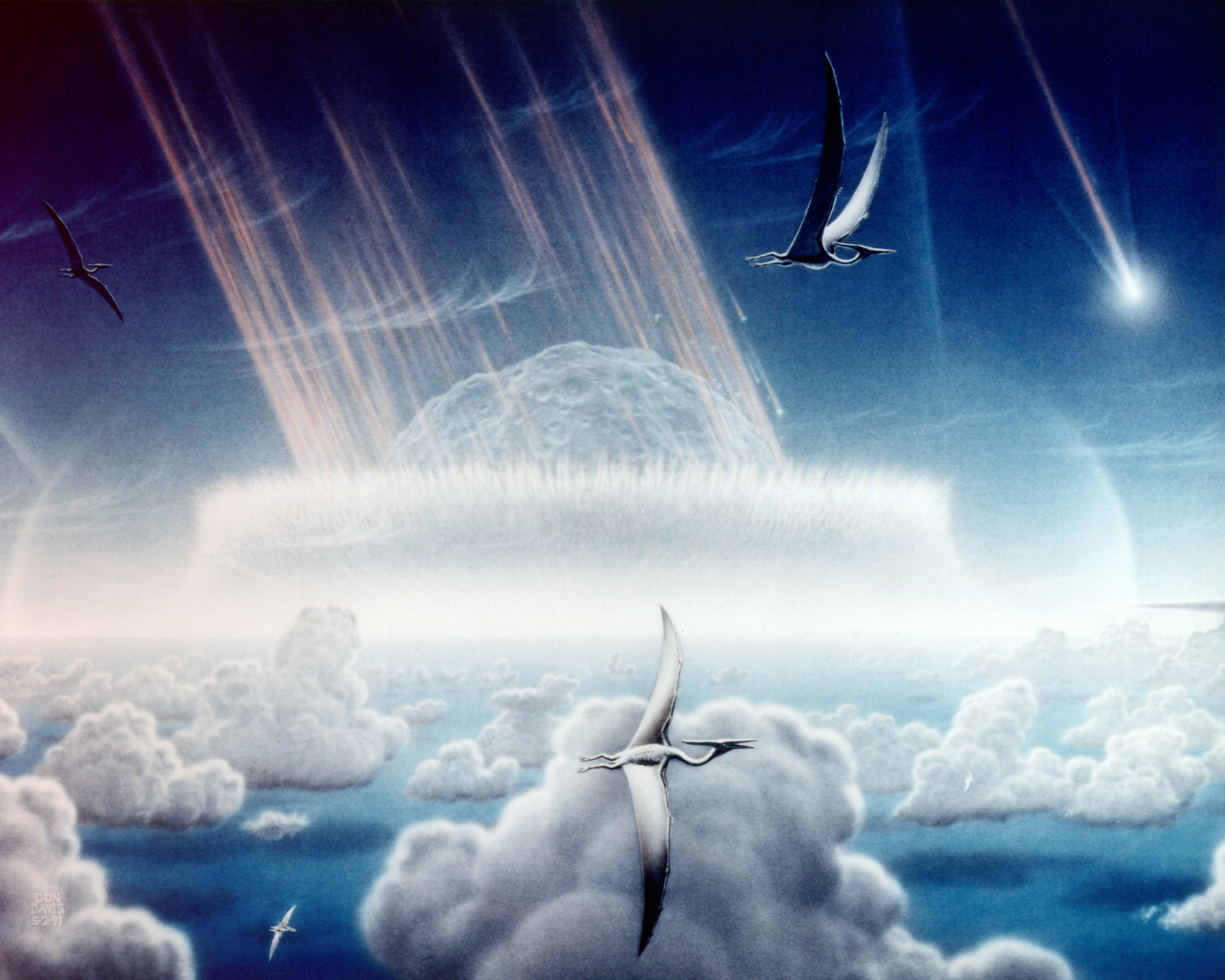
Artist's depiction of the end-Cretaceous impact event

Since the 19th century, a significant amount of research has been conducted on the Cretaceous–Paleogene extinction event, the mass extinction that ended the dinosaur-dominated Mesozoic Era and set the stage for the Age of Mammals, or Cenozoic Era. A chronology of this research is presented here.

Paleontologists have recognized since at least the 1820s that a significant transition occurred between the Mesozoic and Cenozoic eras. Around this time dinosaur fossils were first being described in the scientific literature. Nevertheless, so few dinosaurs were known that the significance of their extinction went unrecognized, and little scientific effort was exerted toward finding an explanation. As more and more different kinds of dinosaurs were discovered, their extinction and replacement by mammals was recognized as significant but dismissed with little examination as a natural consequence of the mammals' supposed innate superiority. Consequently, paleontologist Michael J. Benton has called the years up to 1920 as the "Nonquestion Phase" of Cretaceous–Paleogene extinction research.

Ideas that evolution might proceed along pre-ordained patterns or that evolutionary lineages might age, deteriorate, and die like individual animals became popular starting in the late 19th century, but were superseded by the Neo-Darwinian synthesis. The aftermath of this transition brought renewed interest to the extinction at the end of the Cretaceous. Paleontologists began dabbling in the subject, proposing environmental changes during the Cretaceous like mountain-building, dropping temperatures or volcanic eruptions as explanation for the extinction of the dinosaurs. Nevertheless, much of the research occurring during this period lacked rigor, evidential support or depended on tenuous assumptions. Michael J. Benton called the years between 1920 and 1970 the "Dilettante Phase" of Cretaceous–Paleogene extinction research.

In 1970, paleontologists began studying the Cretaceous–Paleogene extinction in a detailed, rigorous way. Benton considered this to be the beginning of the "Professional Phase" of Cretaceous–Paleogene extinction research. Early in this phase, the pace of the extinctions and the potential role of the Deccan Traps volcanism in India were major subjects of interest. In 1980, father and son duo Luis and Walter Alvarez reported anomalously high levels of the platinum group metal iridium from the K–Pg boundary, but because iridium is rare in Earth's crust they argued that an asteroid impact was needed to account for it. This suggestion set off a bitter controversy. Evidence for an impact continued to mount, like the discovery of shocked quartz at the K–Pg boundary. In 1991, Alan Hildebrand and William Boynton reported the Chicxulub crater in the Yucatan Peninsula of Mexico as a probable impact site. While the controversy continued, the accumulating evidence gradually began to sway the scientific community toward the Alvarez hypothesis. In 2010, an international panel of researchers concluded that impact best explained the extinction event and that Chicxulub was indeed the resulting crater. Because the estimated date of the object's impact and the Cretaceous–Paleogene boundary (K–Pg boundary) coincide, there is now a scientific consensus that this impact was the Cretaceous–Paleogene extinction event which caused the death of most of the planet's non-avian dinosaurs and many other species. The impactor's crater is just over 177 kilometers in diameter, making it the second largest known impact crater on Earth.

== 19th century ==
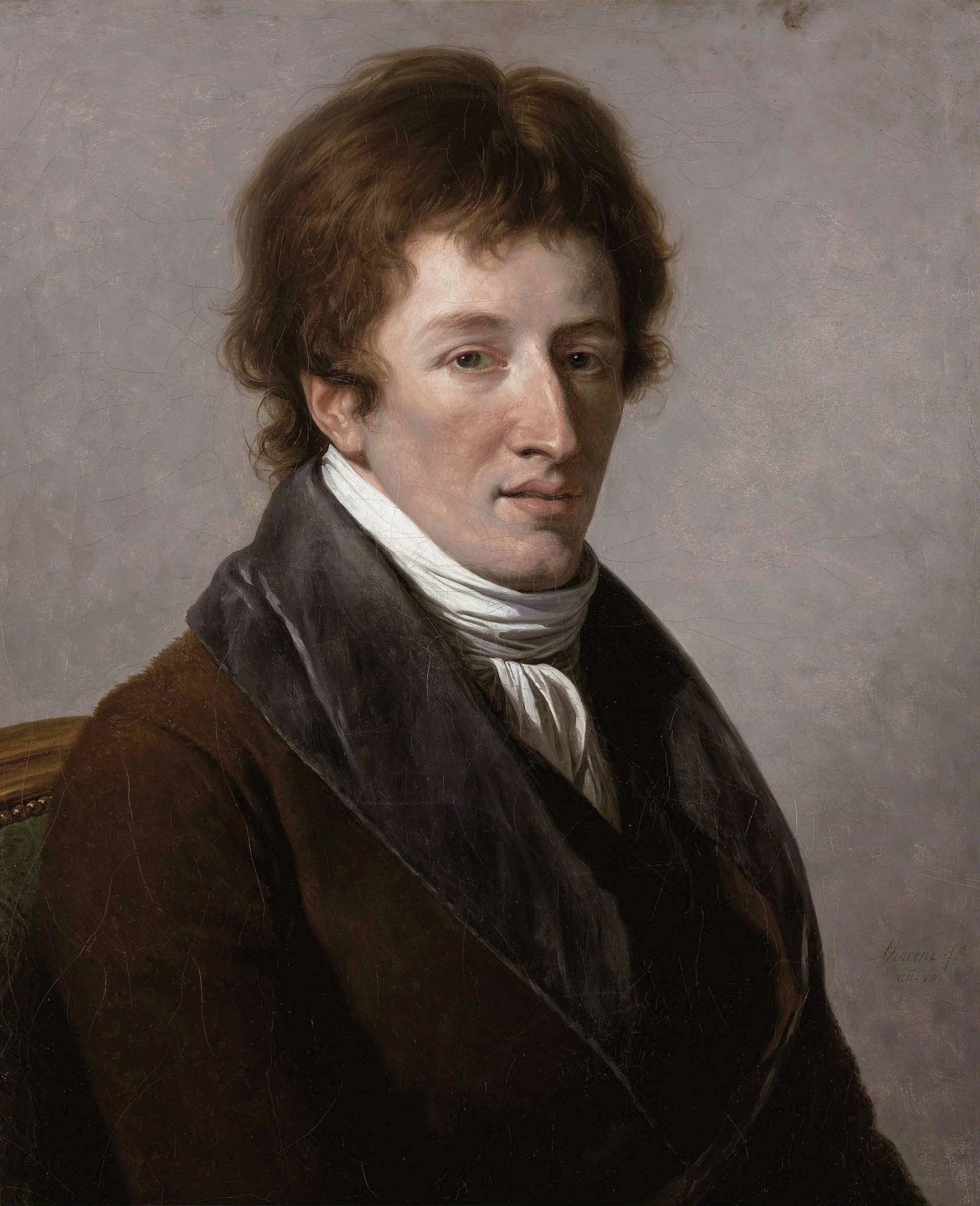
Portrait of Georges Cuvier, who recognized the vast difference in the faunas of the Mesozoic and Cenozoic eras

=== 1820s ===
==== 1825 ====
- Georges Cuvier recognized that significant changes to Earth's biota occurred between the Mesozoic and the Cenozoic eras. Because the most familiar and distinctive Mesozoic lifeforms known at the time were marine, he speculated that life had not yet fully conquered the land. He attributed the end-Cretaceous mass extinction to a catastrophic drop in sea levels that destroyed the habitats of the era's characteristic fauna. He concluded that the mammals of the Cenozoic represented Earth's first truly terrestrial fauna.

=== 1830s ===
==== 1831 ====
- Gideon Mantell recognized dinosaurs as evidence for reptilian dominance over the land in addition to the dominion over the sea held by ichthyosaurs and plesiosaurs. He therefore declared the Mesozoic era to be the "Age of Reptiles". Distinguishing the Mesozoic "Age of Reptiles" from the Cenozoic "Age of Mammals" highlighted the differences these two eras of geologic time.

=== 1840s ===
==== 1842 ====
- Sir Richard Owen proposed that the major reptile groups of the Mesozoic were driven extinct as the oxygen contents of Earth's atmosphere rose to levels better suited for birds and mammals.

=== 1850s ===
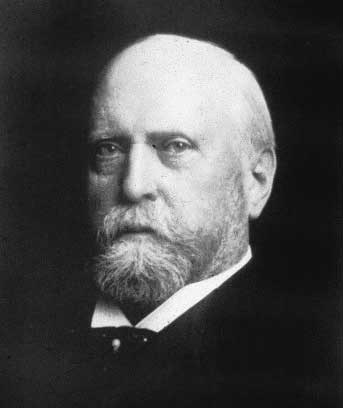
Othniel Charles Marsh interpreted the extinction of the dinosaurs as a gradual process

==== 1854 ====
- Charles Darwin published On the Origin of Species. He regarded the extinction of most taxonomic groups as occurring gradually through the piecemeal loss of member species. However, he considered the extinction of the ammonites at the end of the Mesozoic to have been "wonderfully sudden".

=== 1880s ===
==== 1882 ====
- Othniel Charles Marsh interpreted the extinction of the dinosaurs as a gradual decline over the course of the Cretaceous.

=== 1890s ===
==== 1898 ====
- Arthur Smith Woodward also advocated that the dinosaurs gradually declined into extinction late in the Mesozoic.

== 20th century ==
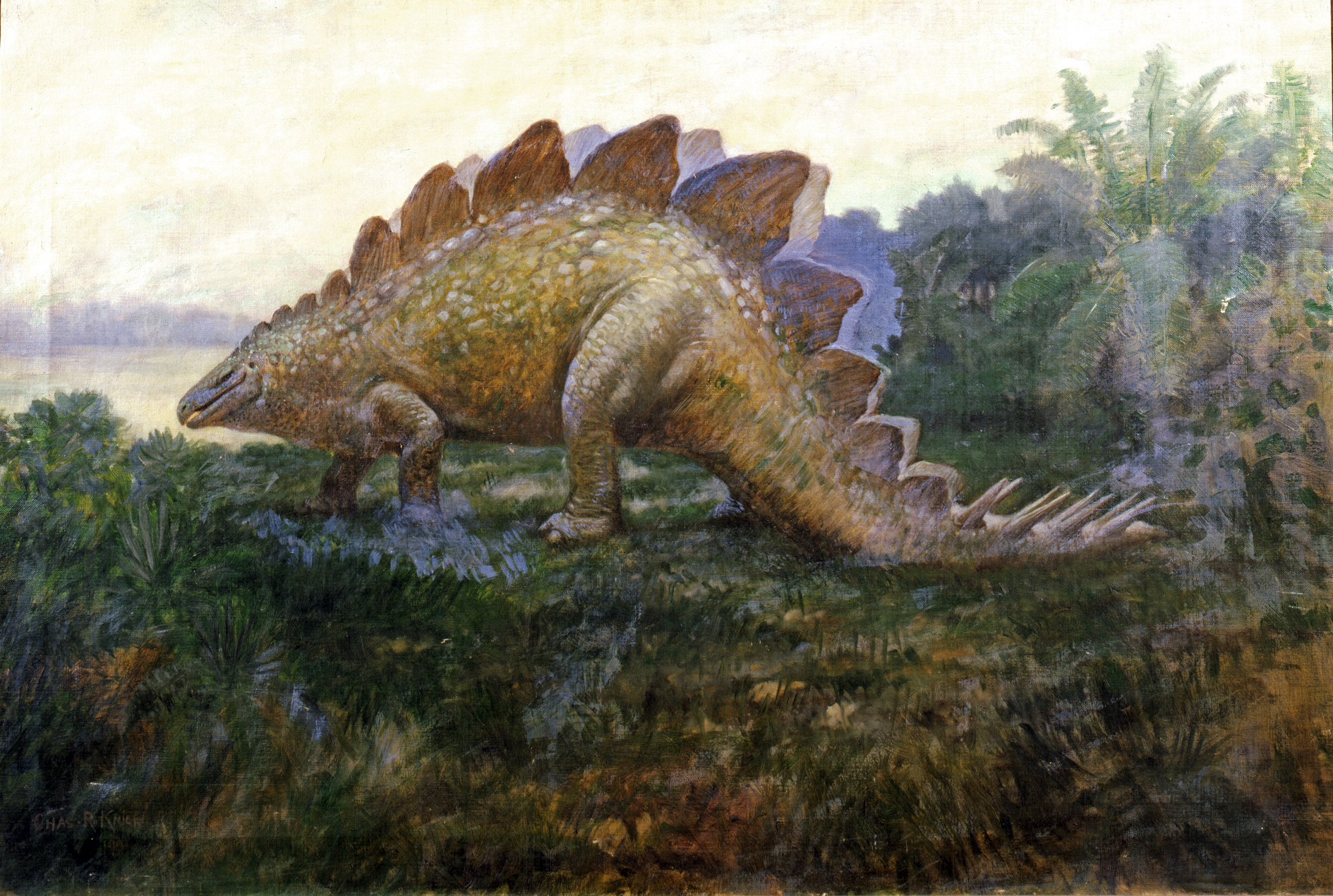
An early 20th century restoration of Stegosaurus by Charles R. Knight

=== 1900s ===
==== 1905 ====
- Frederic Brewster Loomis argued that the plates adorning the backs of stegosaurs were maladaptive traits that sapped their vigor and signaled their impending extinction. Similar arguments would later be extended to the extinction of the dinosaurs overall by Woodward in 1910.

=== 1910s ===
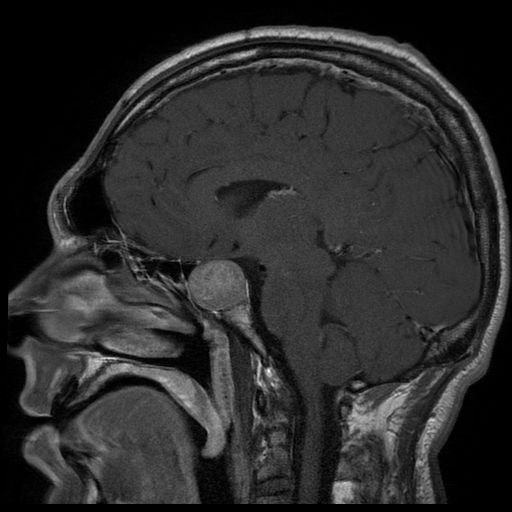
The enlarged pituitary of a human with acromegaly

==== 1910 ====
- Woodward gave an address to the British Association for the Advancement of Science in which he declared the cause of the extinction of the dinosaurs to be "racial senility"- the idea that evolutionary lineages had finite lifespans the way individual organisms do and also exhibit age-related deterioration over time as well. Woodward argued that traits like large size, spiny coverings and lack of teeth seen in some later dinosaurs were signs that the group was approaching its inevitable end.

==== 1917 ====
- Franz Nopcsa suggested that dinosaurs may have developed overactive pituitary glands that led them to become pathologically gigantic in an evolutionary parallel to acromegaly in modern humans. He also suggested that a "[d]iminution of sexual activity" may have played a role in their demise.

=== 1920s ===
==== 1921 ====
- William Diller Matthew argued that dinosaurs were gradually driven extinct as geologic uplift replaced the wet lowland habitats Matthew thought dinosaurs were best adapted to with the more elevated terrain he thought was preferred by mammals.

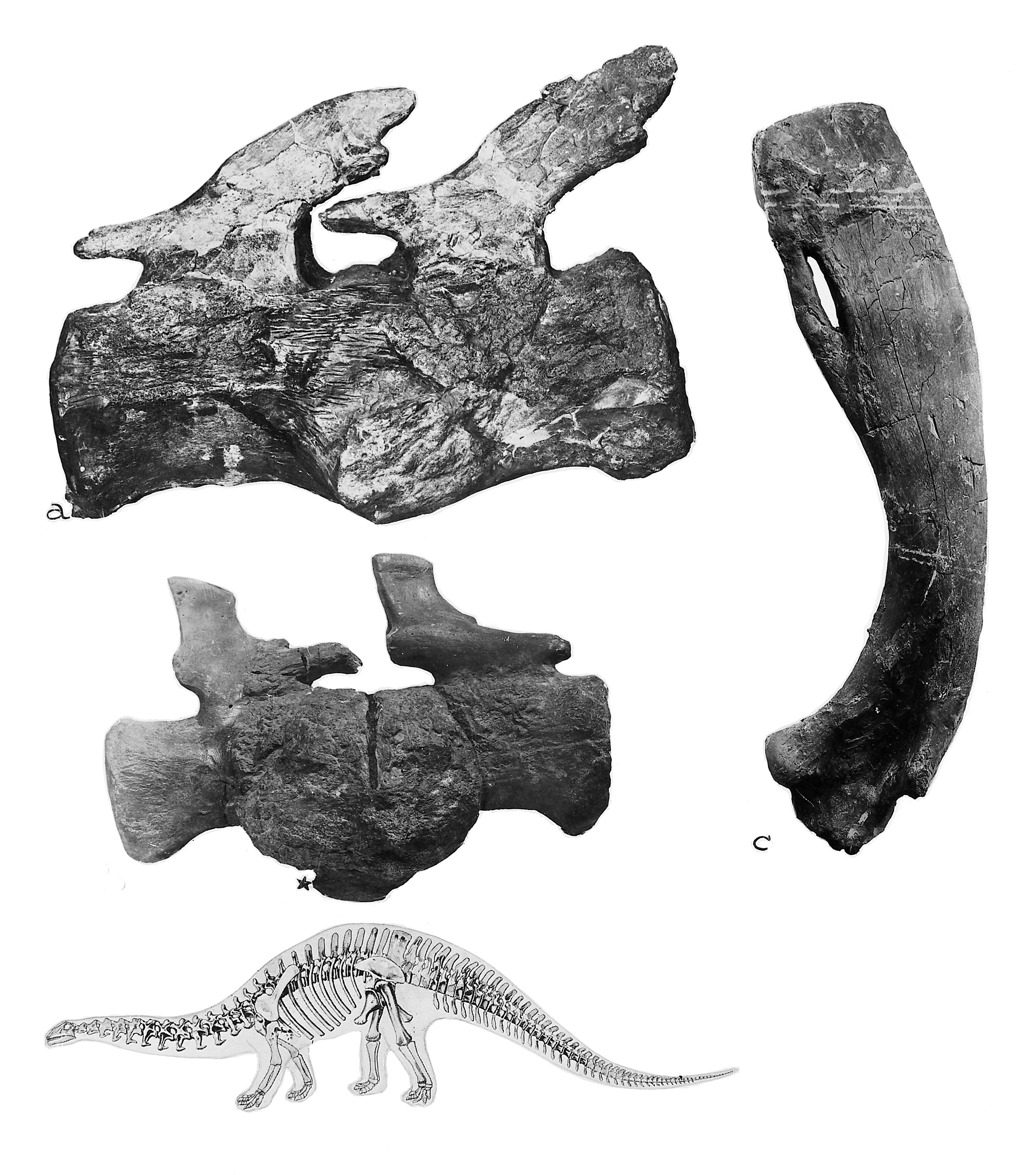
Deforming arthrides in dinosaur vertebrae

==== 1922 ====
- Nopcsa proposed a model for the extinction of the dinosaurs similar to Matthew's but with greater emphasis on the implications the uplifted terrain had for the plants they depended on. He also suggested that competition from mammals that arrived in North America from Asia played a role.
- N. M. Jakolev proposed that the dinosaur went extinct because Earth's climate became too cold to sustain them.

==== 1923 ====
- Roy Lee Moodie proposed that dinosaurs were killed off by diseases. Examples of the pathological health conditions Moodie thought contributed to the extinction of the dinosaurs included arthritis, dental cavities, fractures, and infections.

==== 1925 ====
- Paleobotanist George Wieland hypothesized that Tyrannosaurus rex survived on a diet of eggs. He argued that feeding its great bulk would have led it to consume the entire last generation of dinosaurs before they could even hatch, leading to their extinction. He also suggested that mammals may have driven the dinosaurs extinct by eating all of their eggs.

==== 1928 ====
- L. Müller proposed that volcanic eruptions drove the dinosaurs extinct.
- H. T. Marshall suggested that bombardment from cosmic or ultraviolet radiation caused the extinction of the dinosaurs.

==== 1929 ====
- Alexander Audova analyzed the circumstances of the extinction of the dinosaurs and concluded that they were driven extinct gradually when Earth's climate cooled too severely for their embryos to fully develop in the egg. He dismissed the idea that they went extinct due to factors like racial senility.

=== 1930s ===
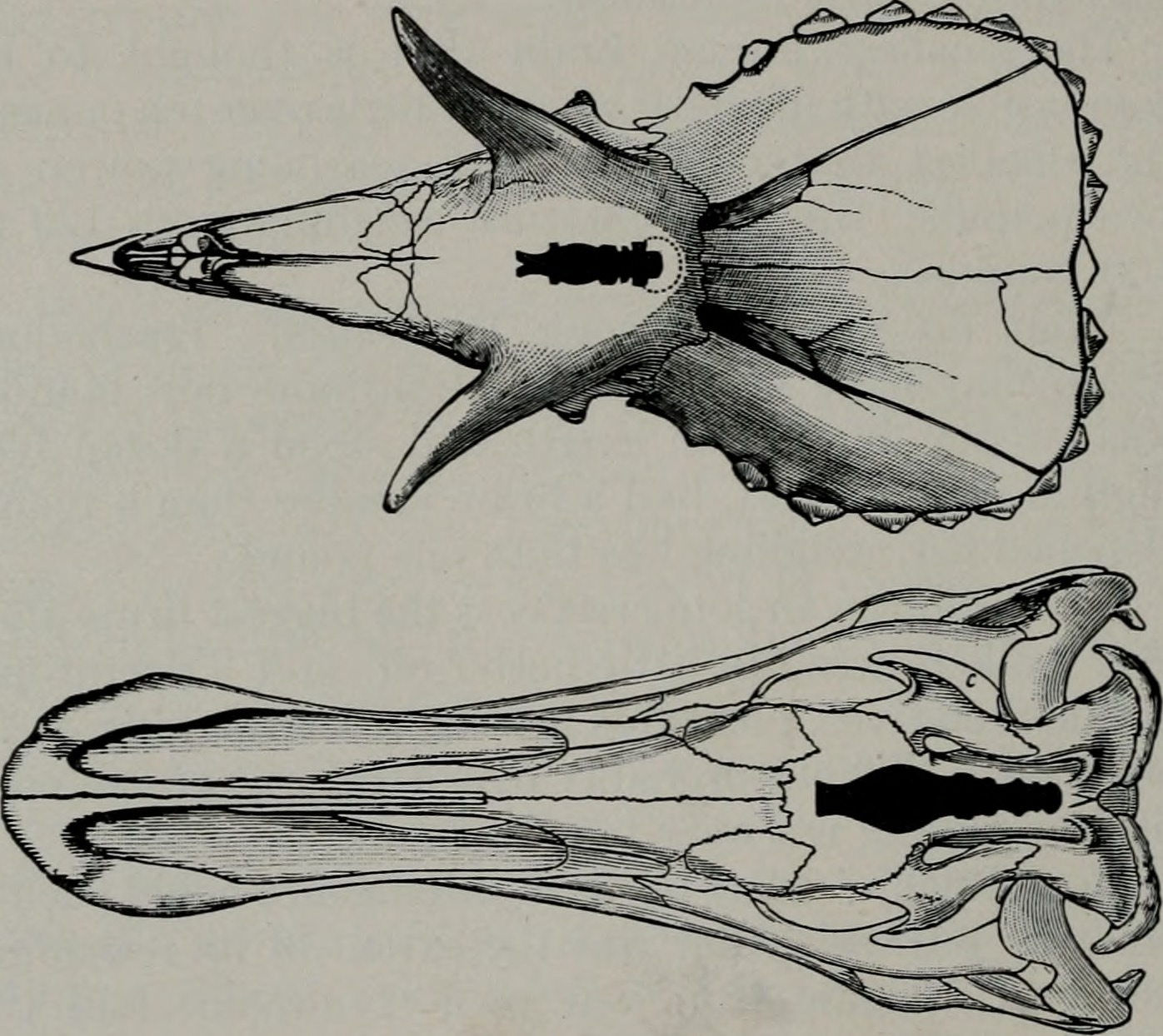
The brains of Triceratops and Edmontosaurus

==== 1939 ====
- Percy Raymond suggested that dinosaur brain size diminished over the course of the Mesozoic until, in effect, they became too stupid to live and went extinct.
- William E. Swinton argued that dinosaurs were driven extinct when the lakes and swamps they inhabited dried up.

=== 1940s ===
==== 1942 ====
- Wieland suggested that the dinosaurs were driven extinct when the amount of carbon dioxide in Earth's atmosphere decreased until it was too low to instigate them to breathe and they suffocated.

==== 1945 ====
- Raymond B. Cowles proposed that the dinosaurs went extinct when Earth's climate became so hot and dry that it affected the ability of male dinosaurs to produce sperm cells.

==== 1946 ====
- Edwin Harris Colbert and others proposed that the dinosaurs went extinct when Earth's climate became too hot and dry to support them.

==== 1949 ====
- Cowles proposed that in addition to preventing dinosaurs from producing sperm, elevating temperatures and aridity at the end of the Mesozoic would have killed vulnerable young dinosaurs, another factor that could have contributed to their extinction.
- Martin Wilfarth argued that dinosaurs were marine animals and were driven extinct by decreasing sea levels during the Late Cretaceous, which dried out their habitats.

=== 1950s ===
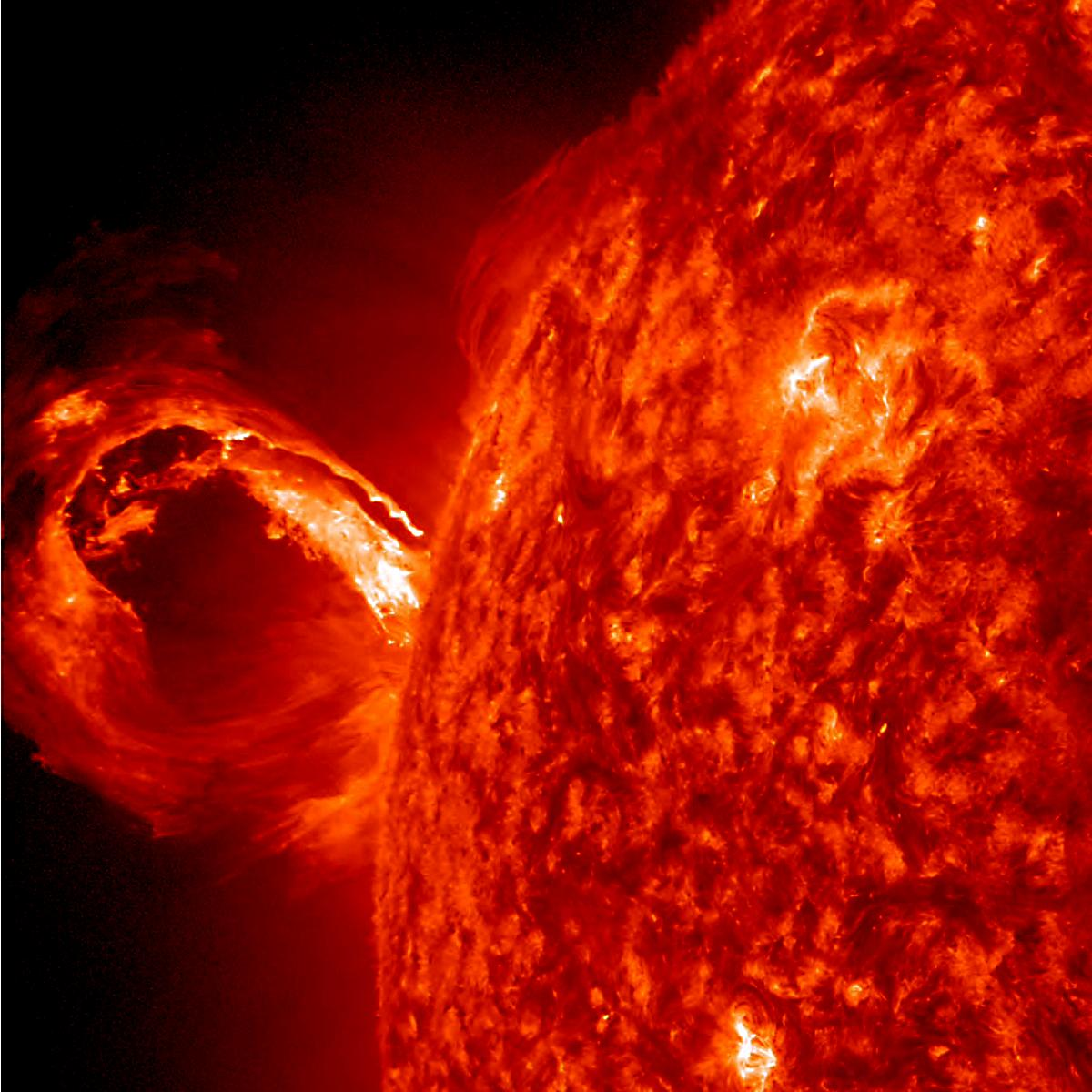
A solar flare

- Petroleos Mexicanos, also known as PEMEX, discovered an unusual subsurface circular structure in the Yucatan Peninsula of Mexico.

==== 1954 ====
- E. Stechow proposed that the extinction of the dinosaurs may be attributable to solar flares that destroyed the ozone layer, allowing ultraviolet radiation to shower the planet.

==== 1956 ====
- Max Walker de Laubenfels hypothesized that at the end of the Cretaceous, a bolide entered Earth's atmosphere, "[f]lash heating" it and incinerating the dinosaurs.

=== 1960s ===
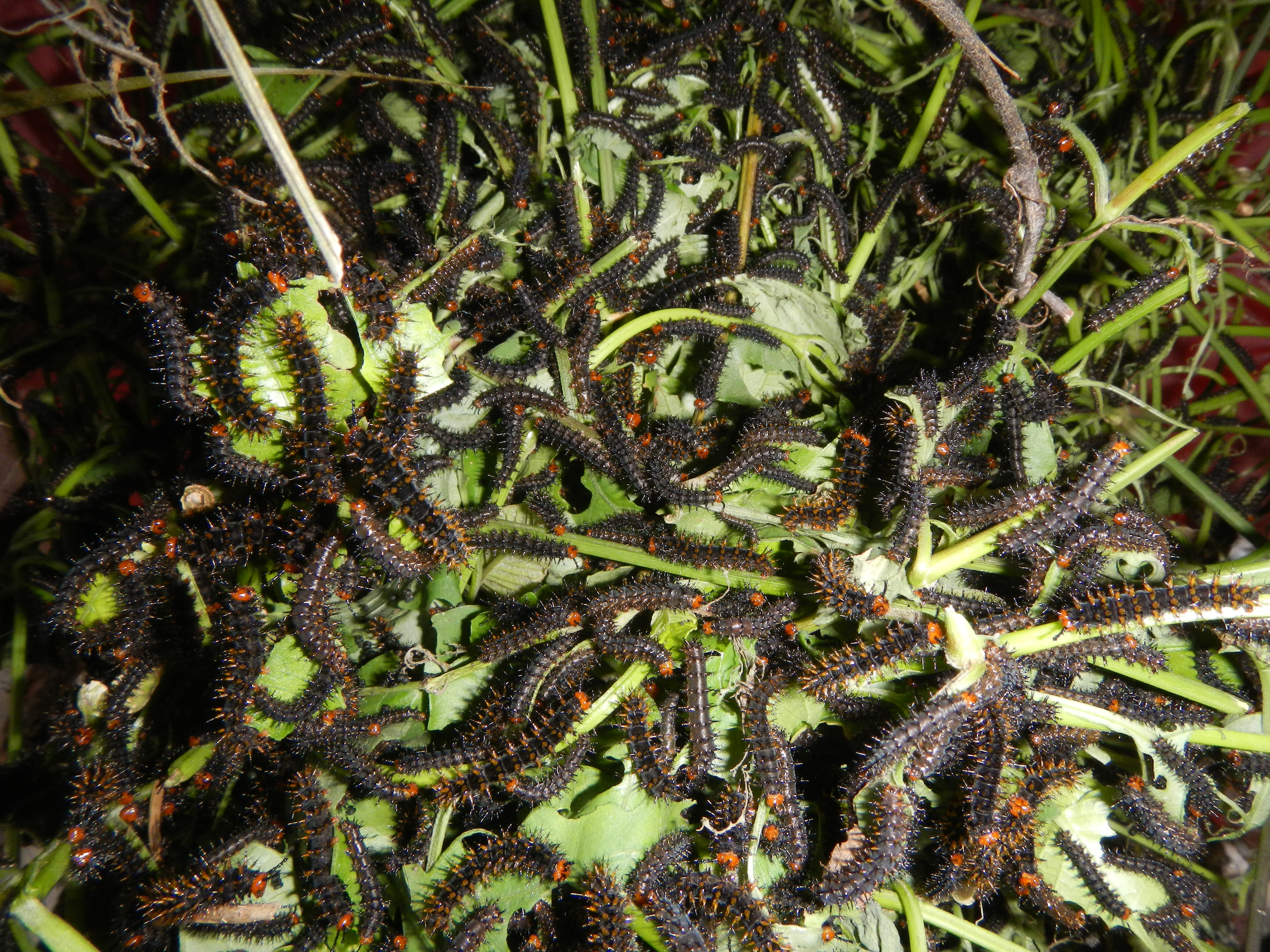
A swarm of caterpillars denuding a plant of vegetation

- PEMEX began drilling into the unusual ring-like structure under the Yucatan and extracting rock cores in search of oil.

==== 1962 ====
- Stanley E. Flanders suggested that at the end of the Cretaceous caterpillars began multiplying until they had so denuded the contemporary plant life that nothing was left for the dinosaurs, who starved to death.

==== 1967 ====
- John M. Cys argued that dinosaurs went extinct because they were unable to hibernate during the winter, leaving them doomed by Earth's changing climate.

==== 1968 ====
- Daniel I. Axelrod and Harry Paul Bailey proposed that the dinosaurs were driven extinct when Earth's climate began exhibiting more marked seasons rather than stable conditions year-round.
- Helen Tappan suggested that the dinosaurs were driven extinct as Earth's terrestrial environments began to flatten out, eliminating their preferred habitats.
- K. D. Terry and Wallace H. Tucker suggested that the dinosaurs may have been driven extinct by ionizing radiation.

=== 1970s ===
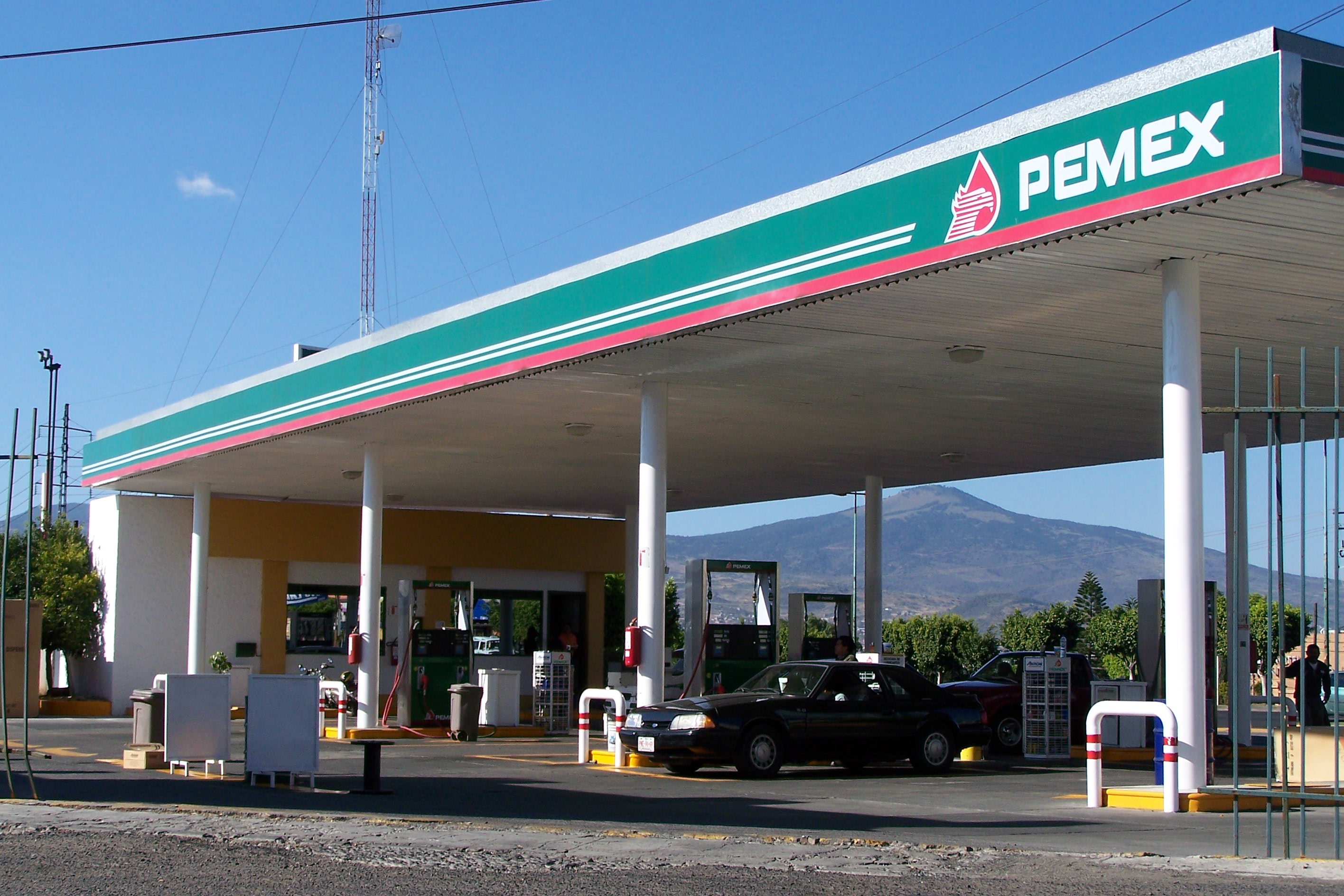
A Pemex gas station in Mexico

- PEMEX continued looking for oil deposits associated with a large circular structure in the Yucatan Peninsula.

==== 1970 ====
- C. B. Hatfield and M. J. Camp suggested that the dinosaurs went extinct due to Earth's "[o]scillations about the galactic plane".

==== 1971 ====
- Dale Russell and Tucker proposed that a nearby supernova emitted a burst of electromagnetic radiations and cosmic rays that killed off the dinosaurs.

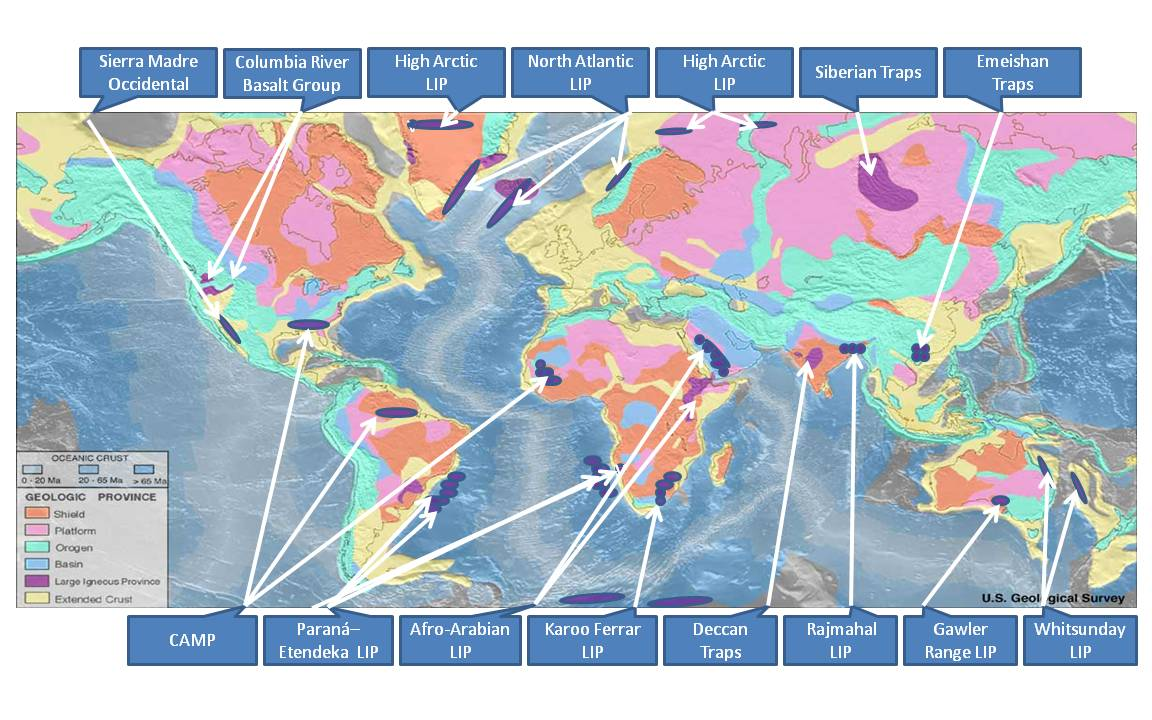
A map showing the location of the large igneous provinces of the world. The Deccan Traps are represented by the purple region in India

==== 1972 ====
- Peter Vogt reported evidence of intense volcanic activity occurring in India around the end of the Cretaceous. He hypothesized that this volcanic activity released poisonous trace elements which brought about the mass extinction.

==== 1973 ====
- Harold Urey argued that comet impacts may have caused mass extinctions in the past and may have been responsible for demarcating the periods of the geologic time scale.

==== 1974 ====
- Jan Smit began studying the extinction of foraminifera at the K–T boundary in Caravaca, Spain. He observed that some of these extinctions must have been rapid.

==== 1976 ====
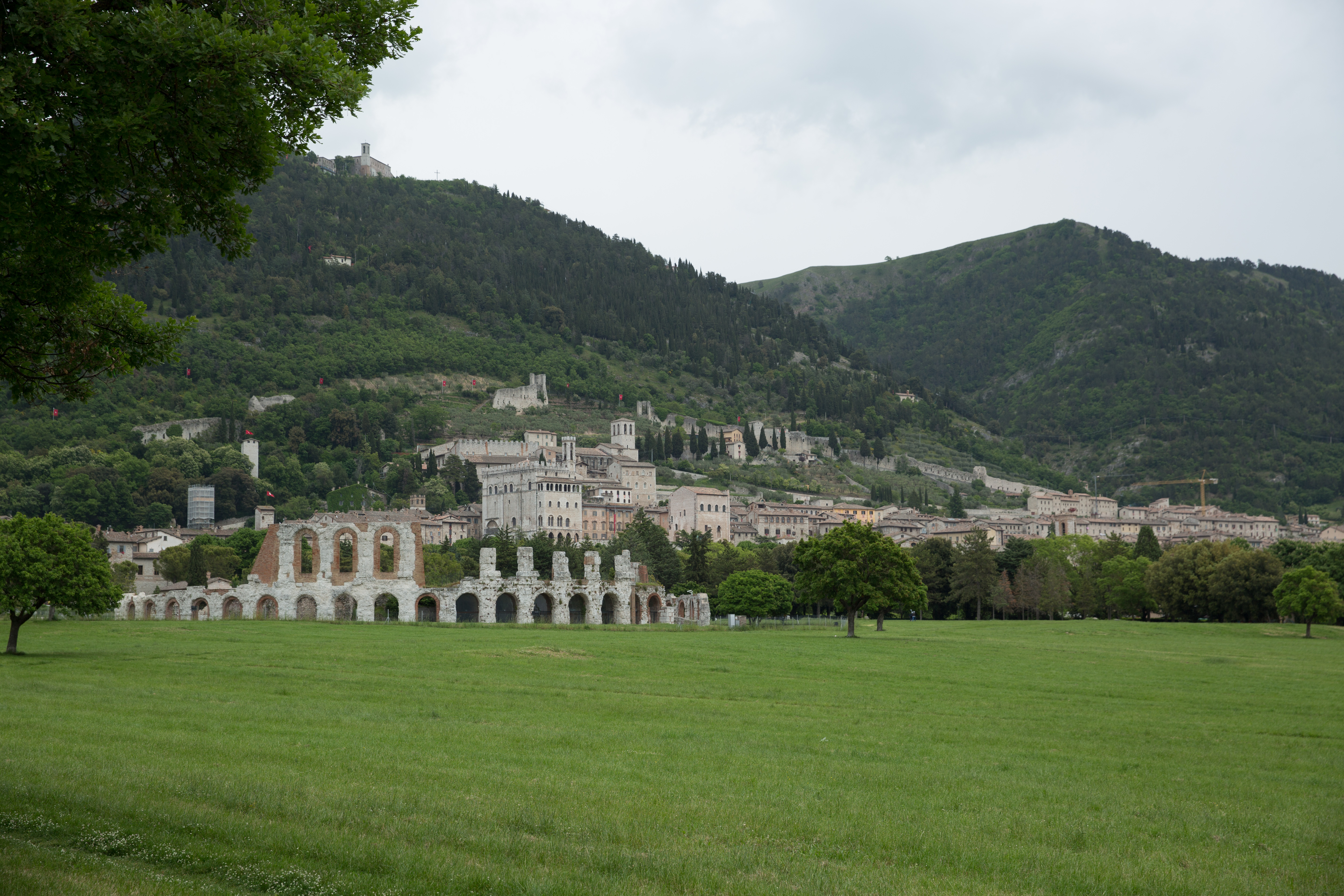
A panorama of Gubbio, Italy

- Tony Swain proposed that when flowering plants evolved, their tissues contained alkaloids and tannins, which poisoned the dinosaurs, leading to their extinction.

==== 1977 ====
- Luis Alvarez and others, including his son Walter, published their research on the magnetic reversals of the Cretaceous–Tertiary boundary interval recorded in the rocks at Gubbio, Italy. They proposed that these rocks be regarded as the standard to which other rocks thought to be of this age are compared.
- Spring: Jan Smit sent 100 rock samples from the K–T boundary at Caravaca to a laboratory in Delft for compositional analysis. The results uncovered high levels of metals like antimony, chromium, cobalt, nickel, and selenium. These unusual findings led Smit to suspect that the mass extinction at the end of the Cretaceous may have had an extraterrestrial cause.

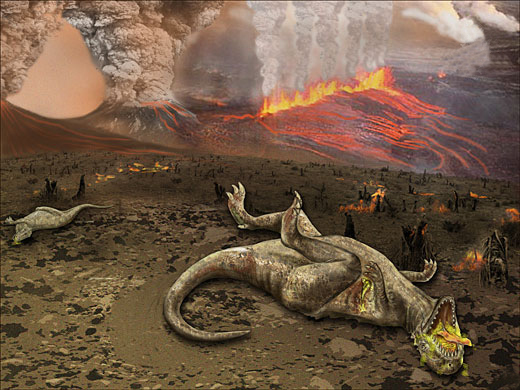
Deccan Traps volcanism was hypothesized to have been a main causative factor in the Cretaceous–Paleogene mass extinction

- Robert T. Bakker argued that Earth's terrain flattened out during the Late Cretaceous, reducing the area of the dinosaurs' preferred habitats and helping to drive them to extinction.

==== 1978 ====
- Burger Wilhelm Oelofsen argued that kimberlite volcanoes were very common during the Late Cretaceous and emitted large quantities of carbon dioxide into the atmosphere. The coincidental drop in sea level at this time period led to a drop in the population of phytoplankton that would have otherwise ingested the excess CO_{2}. The unchecked CO_{2} levels would make it difficult for warm-blooded dinosaur eggs buried in nests to obtain enough oxygen through passive gas exchange with the atmosphere and the embryos would suffocate. By contrast cold blooded animals would have lower oxygen demands and may have been able to endure these conditions, explaining the survival of other egg-laying reptile groups.
- Dewey McLean argued that volcanic CO_{2} emissions during the Cretaceous led to a greenhouse effect that altered earth's climate and ocean currents, leading to the extinction at the end of the period.
- Glen Penfield and Antonio Camargo-Zanoguera detected a giant sub-surface crater in the Yucatan Peninsula because of its unusual magnetic and gravitational signature.

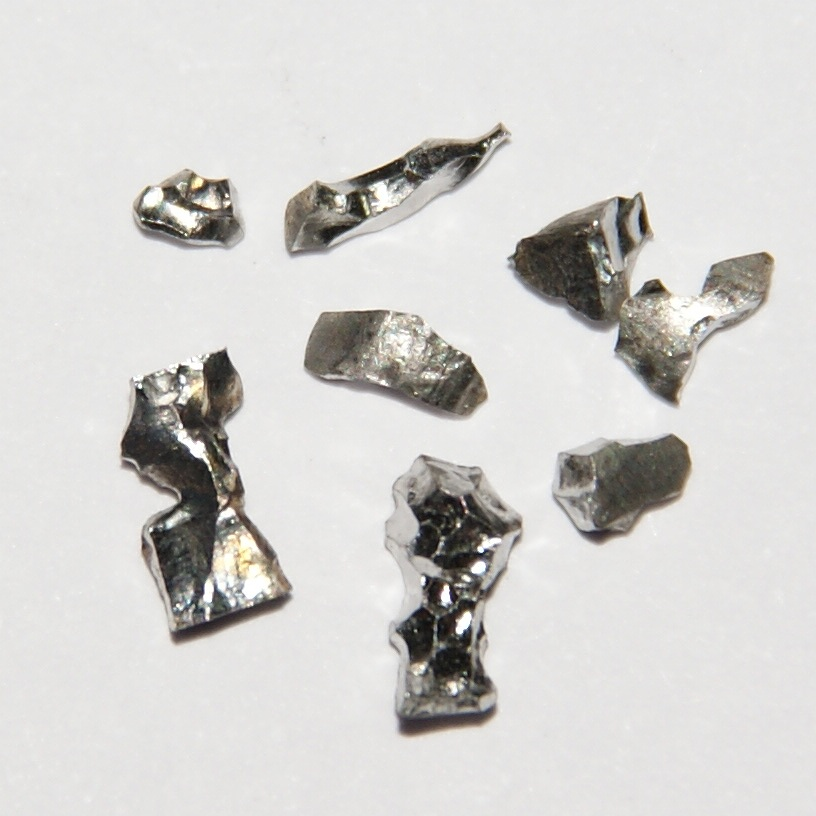
Fragments of iridium

- John Cloudsley-Thompson suggested that if dinosaurs were warm-blooded, increasing temperatures could have caused them to overheat and driven them extinct.

==== 1979 ====
- Heinrich Karl Erben and others reported that eggs attributed to Hypselosaurus exhibit increasing rates of paleopathology like overly thick or thin eggshell or eggs with multiple shell layers through an Upper Cretaceous stratigraphic interval in the Pyrenees mountains in southern France. The researchers speculated that a mutation leading to fatal shell deformities may have spread through the population in defiance of natural selection until fatal eggshell anomalies were so common that the species went extinct. Alternatively, stressful living conditions could have prompted the formation of eggs with multiple shell layers as observed in modern turtles. They speculated that an overly favorable climate could have led to extreme fertility rates. The soaring dinosaur population became overcrowded until the stress from this overcrowding prevented dinosaurs from laying healthy eggs, leading to their extinction.
- Russell reviewed various proposed hypotheses for the extinction of the non-avian dinosaurs. He concluded that the only viable proposal was that the dinosaurs had been wiped out by radiation emitted by a nearby supernova.
- West published an article in New Scientist magazine discussing the Alvarez team's discovery of high iridium concentrations at the K–T boundary in Gubbio. Smit read this article and was startled by the discovery. He wondered how much iridium was present in his own samples of the K–T boundary from Caravaca. He sent the samples to Belgium where they were found to have five times the iridium present in the Alvarez team's samples from Gubbio.
- September: A conference on the K–T boundary was held in Copenhagen, Denmark. Proposals for an extraterrestrial cause of the end-Cretaceous mass extinction were rejected by all of attendees but Jan Smit and Walter Alvarez. These became close friends based on their shared support for extraterrestrial hypotheses, although Smit was still more sympathetic to the supernova hypothesis.
- December: Smit received a pre-print copy of the paper written by the Alvarez team documenting their discovery of iridium at the K–T boundary and interpretation of it as the fingerprints of an asteroid impact.

=== 1980s ===
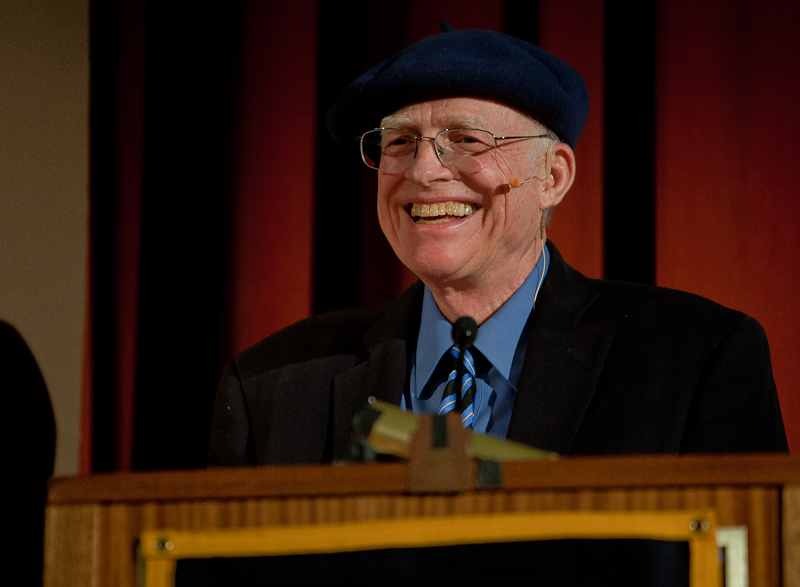
Walter Alvarez in 2012

==== 1980 ====
- Alvarez and others reported spikes in the level of platinum group metals like iridium at the Cretaceous–Tertiary boundary in Italy, Denmark, and New Zealand. They interpreted this sudden introduction of rare-earth metals as evidence for an asteroid impact, to which they attributed the mass extinction at the end of the Cretaceous Period.
- Smit and Hertogen independently reported the presence of an iridium spike at the Cretaceous–Tertiary boundary in Spain, which they also attributed to the impact of an extra terrestrial body and credited with the Cretaceous–Tertiary extinctions.
- May: Smit and Hertogen published the results of their research on the K–T boundary at Caravaca and proposed that an asteroid impact at the end of the Cretaceous triggered the coeval mass extinction.
- June 6th: Alvarez and others published their hypothesis that an impact event cause the extinction of the dinosaurs.
- Penfield wrote to Walter Alvarez, suggesting the Yucatan structure as the possible crater of the end-Cretaceous impactor, but received no response.

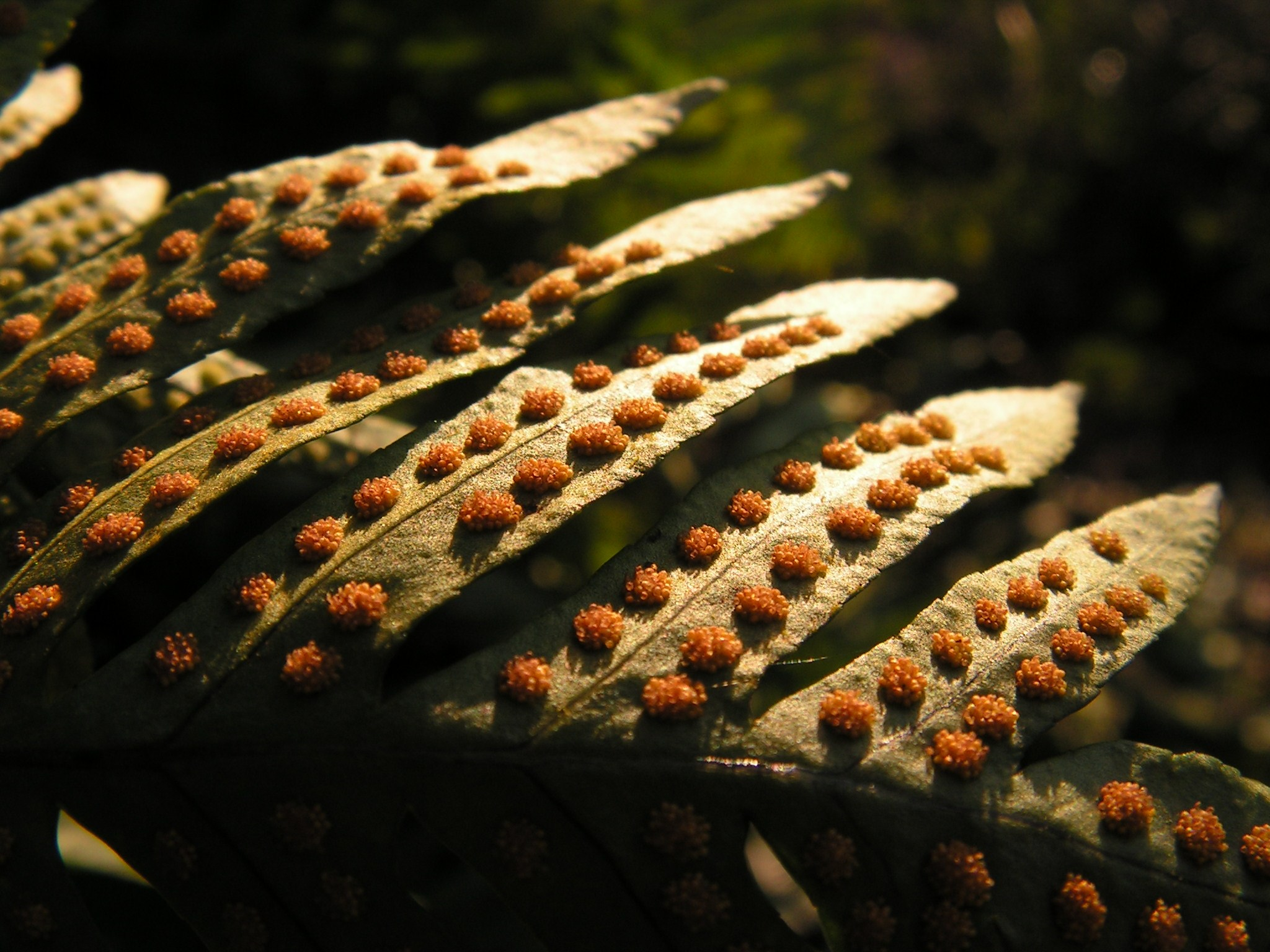
The spore-bearing structures of a modern fern

==== 1981 ====
- Charles J. Orth and others reported a sudden "spike" in the quantity of fossil fern spores near the Cretaceous–Tertiary boundary, "just above the iridium-bearing clay". They also reported an iridium spike at the K–T Boundary in Colorado and Utah. Since these rocks were deposited by freshwater, their discovery bolstered the impact hypothesis by refuting attempts to explain away the K–T boundary's high iridium concentrations as a result of chemical or sedimentary processes occurring in the ocean. This is consistent with the impact event because ferns have been observed to rapidly recolonize areas rendered desolate by modern natural disasters.
- Philip Kerourio debunked Erben and others' suggestion that an increase in the incidence of pathological eggs in dinosaurs led to their extinction. He found that only 0.5–2.5% of eggs in the area Erben and the others studied had multiple shell layers and observed no evidence that these pathologies became more common through the Late Cretaceous.
- A conference dedicated to the end-Cretaceous extinction event was held at Utah's Snowbird ski resort. By this point in time, 36 K–T boundary sites with anomalously high iridium levels had been identified. At the conference, Yale geochemist Karl Turekian disputed the impact hypothesis. He expressed interest in debunking the idea by demonstrating that the isotope ratios of osmium in the rocks of the K–T boundary were typical for rocks of the Earth's crust but inconsistent with those in meteorites.
- Foreze-Carlo Wezel and others reported high iridium levels at Gubbio both far above and below the K–T boundary. They also reported spherules likewise above and below the boundary layer and therefore concluded that the spherules could not have been produced by a bolide impact.
- Penfield and Camargo reported the existence a crater dating to the K–T boundary in the Yucatan Peninsula during a presentation to the Society of Exploration Geophysicists. They proposed that this crater may have been caused by the same impact event to which Alvarez had recently attributed the mass extinction at the end of the period.
- Paleontologist Peter Ward reported in a presentation to colleagues at Berkeley that his research supported the idea of a rapid extinction of the ammonites at the Cretaceous–Tertiary boundary.
  A diagram explaining the Signor–Lipps effect
- Clemons, Archibald and others published one of the first rebuttals to the Alvarez hypothesis. They argued that the fossil record of contemporary plants shows a gradual progressive adaptation of the flora to colder temperatures as the Cretaceous ended and the Tertiary began.

==== 1982 ====
- Philip Signor and Jere Lipps argued that extinctions can appear more gradual in the fossil record than actually transpired because any given level in the stratum will preserve fewer than the interval overall. They observed a strong correlation between the area of rock deposited during a given time interval and that time interval's biodiversity. This observation is attributable to the obvious fact that the biodiversity of a time interval can only be inferred from fossils preserved in rocks deposited then. If fewer rocks are known from a given time, then there are also fewer potential sources of fossils. This can mislead scientists into thinking that the biodiversity of a taxon was declining, when in actuality there are simply fewer sources of fossils for the later members of the group.
- Toon and others argued that dust ejected into the atmosphere by an asteroid impact at the end of the Cretaceous would have lowered temperatures on land to near freezing levels for 45 days to six months. This scenario is known as "impact winter". The oceans however would only see a slight temperature drop due to their greater heat capacity.
- Hsu and others argued based on carbon isotopic evidence that photosynthesis in ocean plankton nearly completely halted at the Cretaceous–Tertiary boundary. They nicknamed this scenario the "Strangelove Ocean".

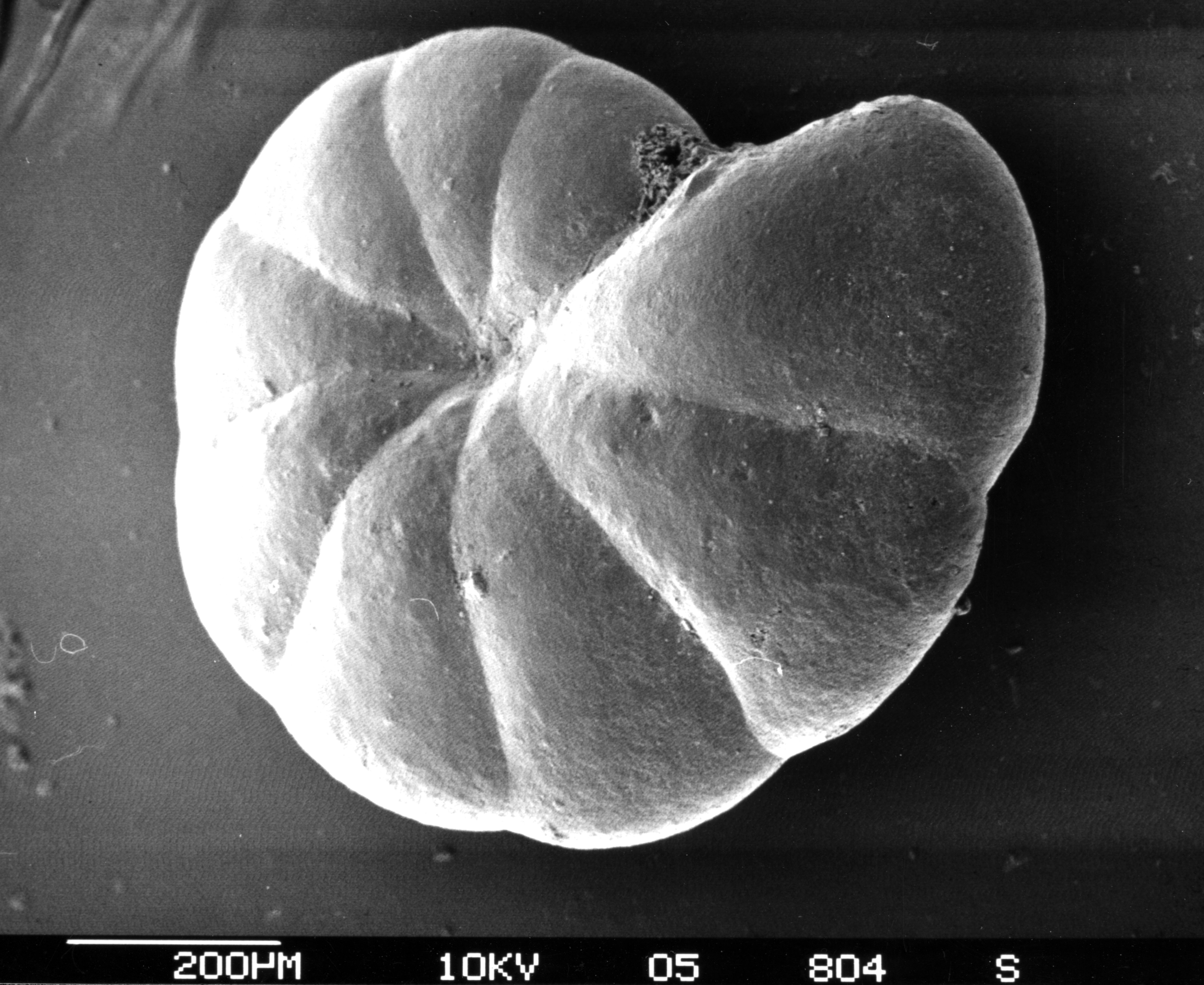
A Brazilian foraminiferan microfossil dating to shortly after the end of the Cretaceous

- Dale Russell argued that since the Campanian age was twice as long as the Maastrichtian, one would expect it to have twice as many dinosaur species, so a disparity between the two is not necessarily evidence that they were in decline.
- Archibald and Clemens argued that the floral and faunal turnover from the Mesozoic to Cenozoic was gradual. They rejected the impact hypothesis, regarding either a super nova or an influx of Arctic seawater into more southerly waters that lowered global temperatures.
- October: Luis Alvarez made "a pre-emptive declaration of victory" for the impact hypothesis to the National Academy of Sciences. This brash claim would earn him ire from geologists and paleontologists alike.
- Hans Thierstein found that 97% of foraminiferan species and 92% of their genera went extinct at the K–T boundary.
- Jan Smit reported that the only foraminiferan species to survive the Cretaceous was Guembelitria cretacea, and that all subsequent foraminiferans were its descendants.
- Ferguson and Joanen proposed that an increasingly hot and dry climate could have skewed the ratio of male to female dinosaur hatchlings, leading to their extinction.
- McLean attributed the extinction of the dinosaurs to volcanism at the end of the Cretaceous.

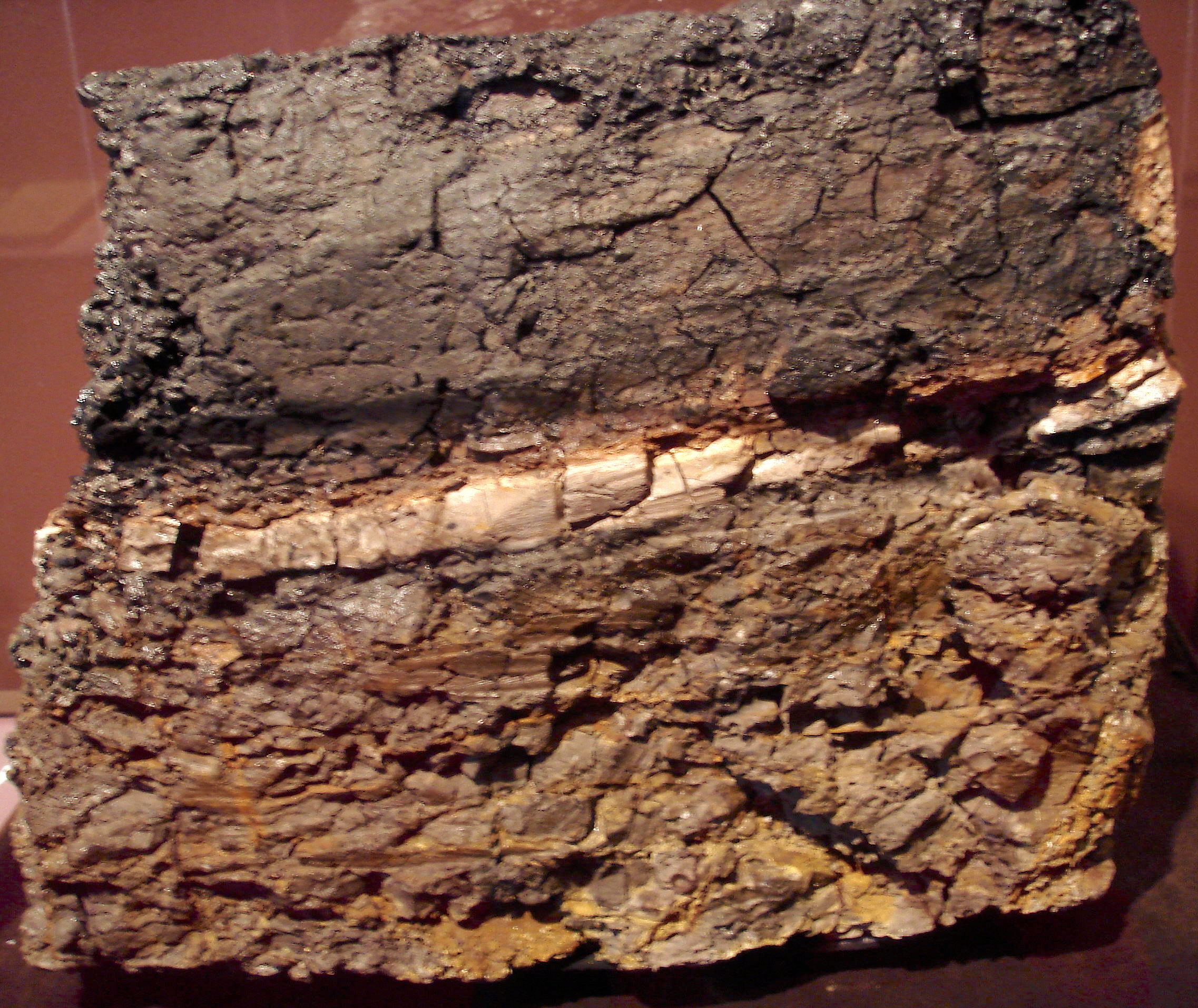
A sample of the iridium-rich Cretaceous–Tertiary boundary from Wyoming

==== 1983 ====
- Anomalously high quantities of platinum group metals were discovered in terrestrial deposits laid down at the time of the Cretaceous–Tertiary boundary in the western United States. The presence of these metals in terrestrial rocks bolstered the asteroid impact hypothesis by overturning alternative explanations for the iridium spike as resulting from earthly chemical processes concentrating them in seawater.
- Pollock and others estimated that the asteroid impact that caused the Cretaceous–Paleogene extinction ejected into the atmosphere brought on 3 months of darkness.
- Luck and Turekian demonstrated that the isotope ratios of osmium in the rocks of the K–T Boundary were more typical for a meteorite than those of the Earth's crust, confirming rather than debunking the impact hypothesis.
- By the end of the year, 50 K–T boundary sites with anomalously high iridium levels had been identified.
- Charles Officer and Charles Drake published their first attack on the impact hypothesis. They synthesized previously published data on 15 core samples containing the Cretaceous–Tertiary boundary taken from various places around the world, including undersea. They found three of the samples to have been formed during periods of different polarities of Earth's magnetic field. This meant that the rock record of the Cretaceous–Tertiary transition had a different absolute age at different locations and any physical commonality shared between these rocks of different ages could not have resulted from a single instantaneous event. They also argued that the elevated iridium concentrations at the K–T boundary were spread gradually across about 60 cm of the stratigraphic column, rather than increasing sharply in a "spike" right at the boundary itself.
- Montanari and others interpreted feldspar spherules from Caravaca as impact ejecta that had melted and rehardened.
- The paper that served as the basis for Luis Alvarez's declaration of victory speech to the National Academy of sciences was published. He expressed shock that paleontologists lacked sufficient "respect" to see dinosaurs as capable of persisting in the face of mundane environmental changes compared to his own view that only a devastating catastrophe like an impact event could have led to their extinction.
- Luis Alvarez gave a presentation to the National Academy of Sciences where he proposed that all of earth's mass extinctions were due to impact events.
- Keith proposed that increasing levels of carbon dioxide in Earth's atmosphere caused oceans to stagnate, which led to the extinction of the dinosaurs.

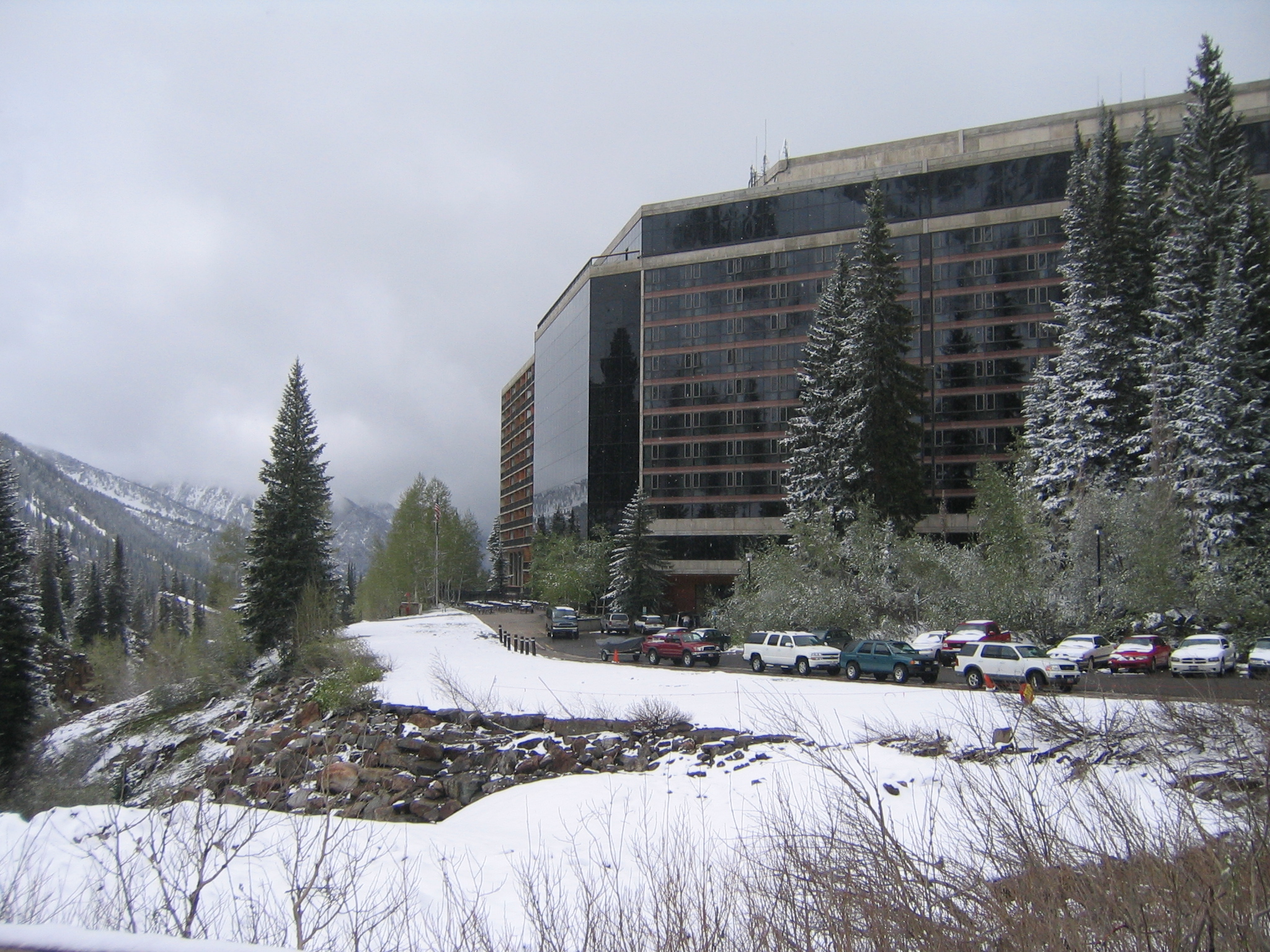
The Snowbird Ski Resort, site of the contentious Cretaceous–Paleogene extinction event conferences

==== 1984 ====
- Bohor and his team found the K–T boundary at a centimeter-thick claystone in Montana. Their examination uncovered evidence for the disappearance from the rock record of many different kinds of fossil pollen, as well as anomalously high iridium levels. Bohor and his colleagues' status as geologists and familiar methodology helped the impact hypothesis gain credibility among fellow researchers who were reluctant to consider proposals from scholars outside the field.
- Alvarez and others published a rebuttal to Officer and Drake's 1983 paper that attempted to refute the impact hypothesis through magnetostratigraphy. They criticized Officer and Drake for having ignored the research presented at the first Snowbird conference, despite Drake having attended and even previously publishing on some of that very research. The Alvarez team also criticized Officer and Drake for relying on data published by other workers who questioned their own results. For instance, one of the K–T boundary-bearing core samples that supposedly formed at a different time than the others was heavily bioturbated according to the researchers who first studied it. These previous workers acknowledged that the modifications the sampled sediments experienced between deposition and lithification made them unreliable for paleomagnetic dating. Alvarez and his collaborators concluded that Officer and Drake were cherry picking the available data for any evidence that could be marshaled against the impact hypothesis while ignoring the vast quantity that supported it. They also reported the results of their attempt to relocate the high iridium concentrations that Wezel and others reported from sections of the rocks at Gubbio other than the K–T boundary. Despite their re-examinations of the rocks there, they could find no evidence of high iridium levels anywhere other than the boundary itself. They concluded that the Wezel team's anomalous iridium readings were the result of contamination.
- Dewey McLean claims to have endured a campaign of persecution from Luis Alvarez resulting in so much stress that he spent this entire year suffering from crippling joint pain.
- Bevan French estimated that the end-Cretaceous impact must have occurred within 3500 km of Montana, based on the shocked quartz discovered there.
- Summer: A poll of more than 600 paleontologists and other Earth scientists found 24% to support the impact hypothesis of the Cretaceous–Paleogene extinction event, 38% agreed that the impact occurred but was not the true cause of the mass extinction, 26% denied that any impact had occurred and 12% completely denied the occurrence of a mass extinction at all.
- Smit and Sander van der Kaars argued that the K–T boundary in the Hell Creek formation occurred 2–12 m lower than researchers had previously realized, giving the illusory impression that dinosaurs had died out there before the end of the period. They also argued that the "Z" coal beds of the formation used to mark the beginning of the Cenozoic were actually different ages at different exposures and were not useful stratigraphic demarcators.

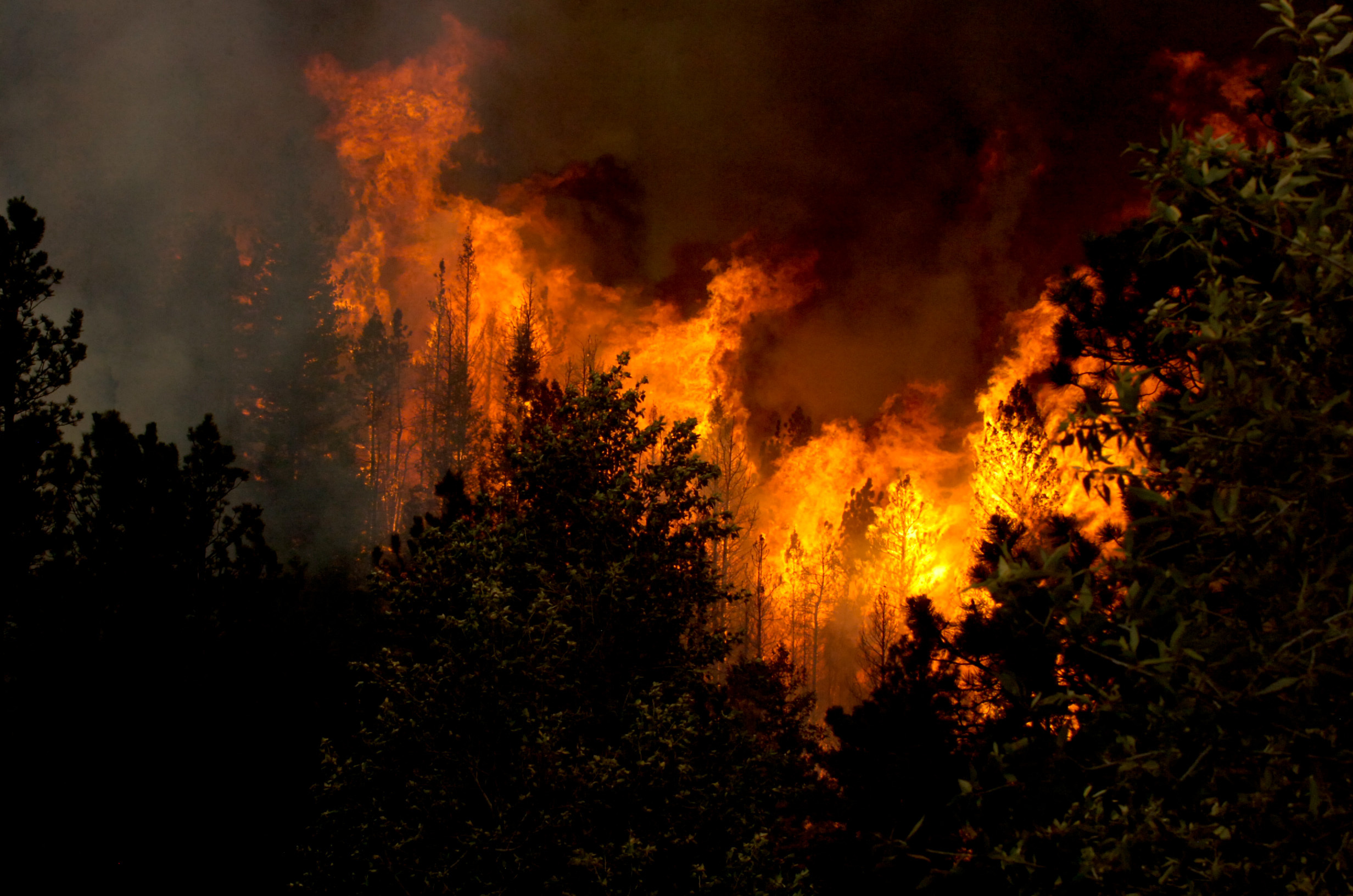
A modern wildfire

==== 1985 ====
- Wolbach and others reported the results of their attempt to locate noble gases at the K–T Boundary in Denmark which could have been left by an impactor. Serendipitously they found high concentrations of soot at the boundary. If the boundary layer had indeed formed rapidly, then this soot may have been left by wildfires that consumed up to 90% of earth's terrestrial biomass.
- Officer and Drake published their second attack on the impact hypothesis. They argued that the high iridium reported from the K–T boundary was introduced gradually by volcanic activity, not suddenly by a bolide impact. They also disputed the attribution of fracture planes in shocked quartz to the forces generated by the supposed end-Cretaceous impact event and instead argued that these fracture planes could have been generated by mundane geologic forces like mount-building and metamorphism. They argued that since geologic structures preserved at Sudbury Basin and Vredefort impact structure preserve shocked quartz of terrestrial origin, it cannot be used as evidence for an impact. They observed that volcanologists studying the Kilauea Volcano in Hawaii found the aerosols it emitted to contain iridium levels similar to those of meteorites.

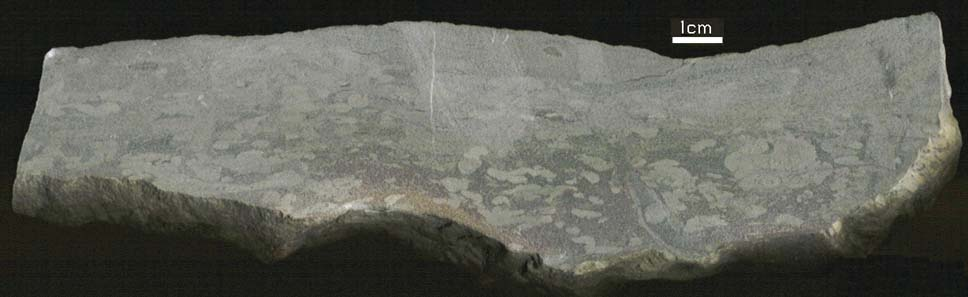
A sedimentary rock showing signs of bioturbation

- Smit and Kyte criticized Officer and Drake's interpretation of the effects bioturbation would have on sediments laid down at the K–T boundary. Officer and Drake operated under the assumption that bioturbation would only affect a few centimeters of sediments, so the activities of animals living in the sediment would not penetrate deeply enough to spread rapidly deposited iridium that far down. However, Smit and Kyte pointed out that tektites are present across a 60 cm span at the boundary. They argued that since the tektites must have been deposited rapidly and were reworked to that depth, rapidly deposited iridium could have been as well.
- Bevan French, an expert on shock metamorphism, rejected Officer and Drake's claim that mountain-building or volcanism could account for the fracture planes in the shocked quartz found at the Cretaceous–Tertiary boundary.
- Officer presented Wezel's report of spherules away from the K–T boundary in an address to a meeting of the American Geophysical Union. After the presentation Walter Alvarez pointed out that some of the purported spherules were actually modern insect eggs that the researchers had failed to clean off their specimens.

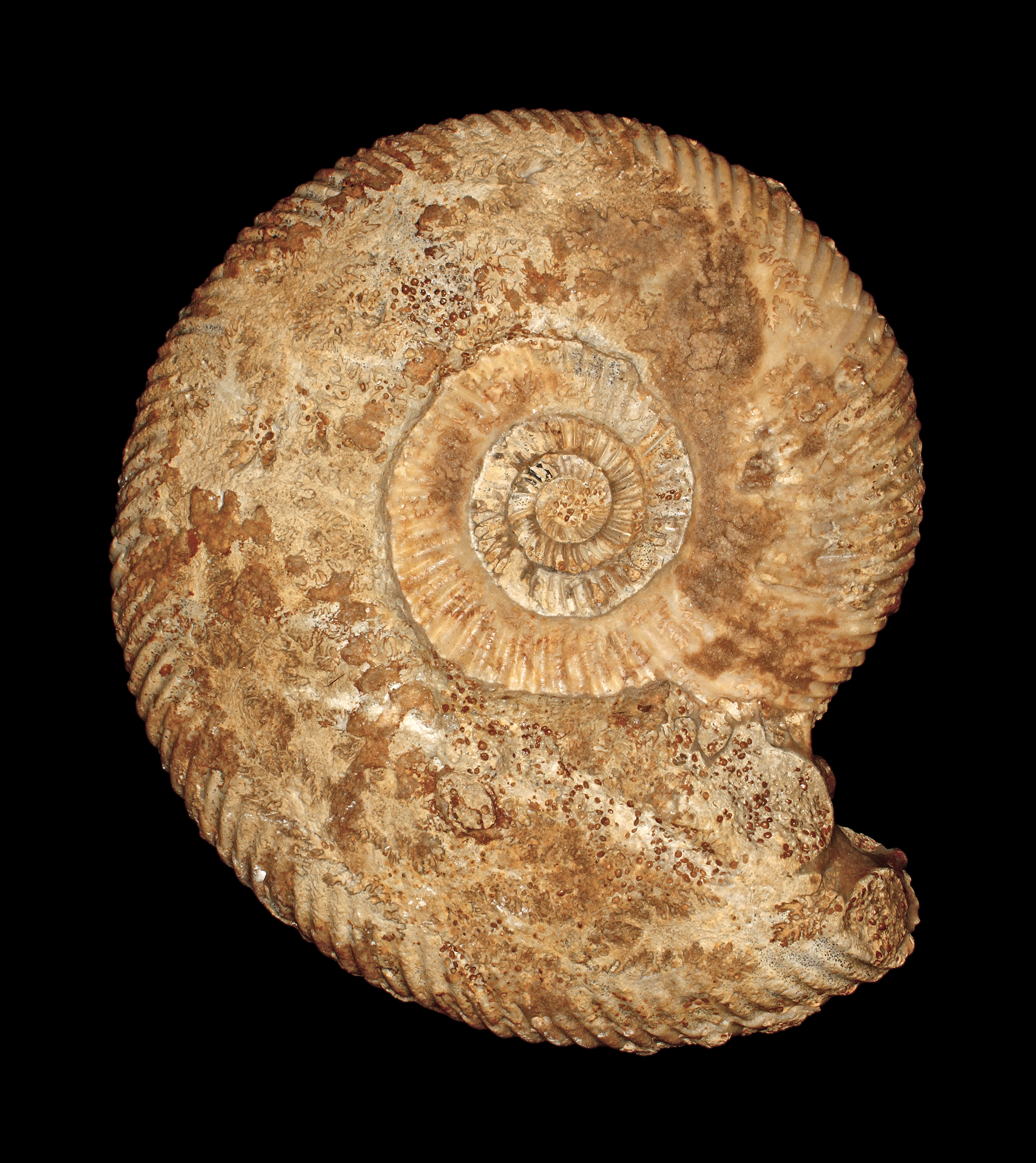
An ammonoid

- Smit and Romein interpreted a turbidite deposit from Brazos, Texas as the probable legacy of an impact-generated tsunami. They attributed the Texan turbidite to the tsunami because of its close association with the iridium-bearing K–T boundary and its status as the only turbidite deposit in the region.

==== 1986 ====
- Sheehan and Hansen observed that taxa dependent on photosynthesis-based food chains experienced greater losses than those which could rely on detritus. Examples of taxa that suffered major or complete extinctions include ammonites, plankton, and some mollusks.
- Officer and Ekdale disputed the interpretation of deposits at Stevns Klint, Denmark as soot rapidly deposited by global wildfires in the wake of an asteroid impact. They argued that the complex stratigraphy and abundant burrow fossils they observed in these deposits suggested that the strata took much longer to form than can be accounted for by the wildfire hypothesis.
- Kyte and Wasson examined the iridium contents of a long core sample extracted from the Pacific Ocean. This sample contained sediments ranging from 35 to 67 million years in age. The researchers found very low levels of iridium throughout the sample, except for at the K–T Boundary. This bolstered the impact hypothesis by demonstrating the scarcity of iridium in earth's crust over time, which is consistent with the interpretation that it originated with an unusual event.

The resonance structures of nitric acid

- Naslund and others also reported spherules above and below the K–T boundary at Gubbio. They estimated that the spherule-bearing interval took about 22 million years to be deposited and the spherules couldn't have been a result of an impact event.

==== 1987 ====
- Ronald Prinn and Bruce Fegley argued that the energy of an asteroid impact at the end of the Cretaceous period would have led atmospheric nitrogen and oxygen to react, forming large quantities of nitric acid that would have fallen back to Earth in the form of acid rain.
- Bohor and others reported shocked quartz from seven more K–T boundary exposures. They also studied quartz from Mount Toba, where shock fractures were much less common and simpler in structure than quartz from the K–T boundary.
- December: Brian Huber disembarked on a ship from Mauritius to Desolation Island off the coast of Antarctica in order to drill core samples from the seafloor. The sample taken off the coast of Desolation Island showed a sharp K–T boundary with abundant foraminiferan fossils below it and few above it. The finding convinced Huber of the impact hypothesis.

==== 1988 ====
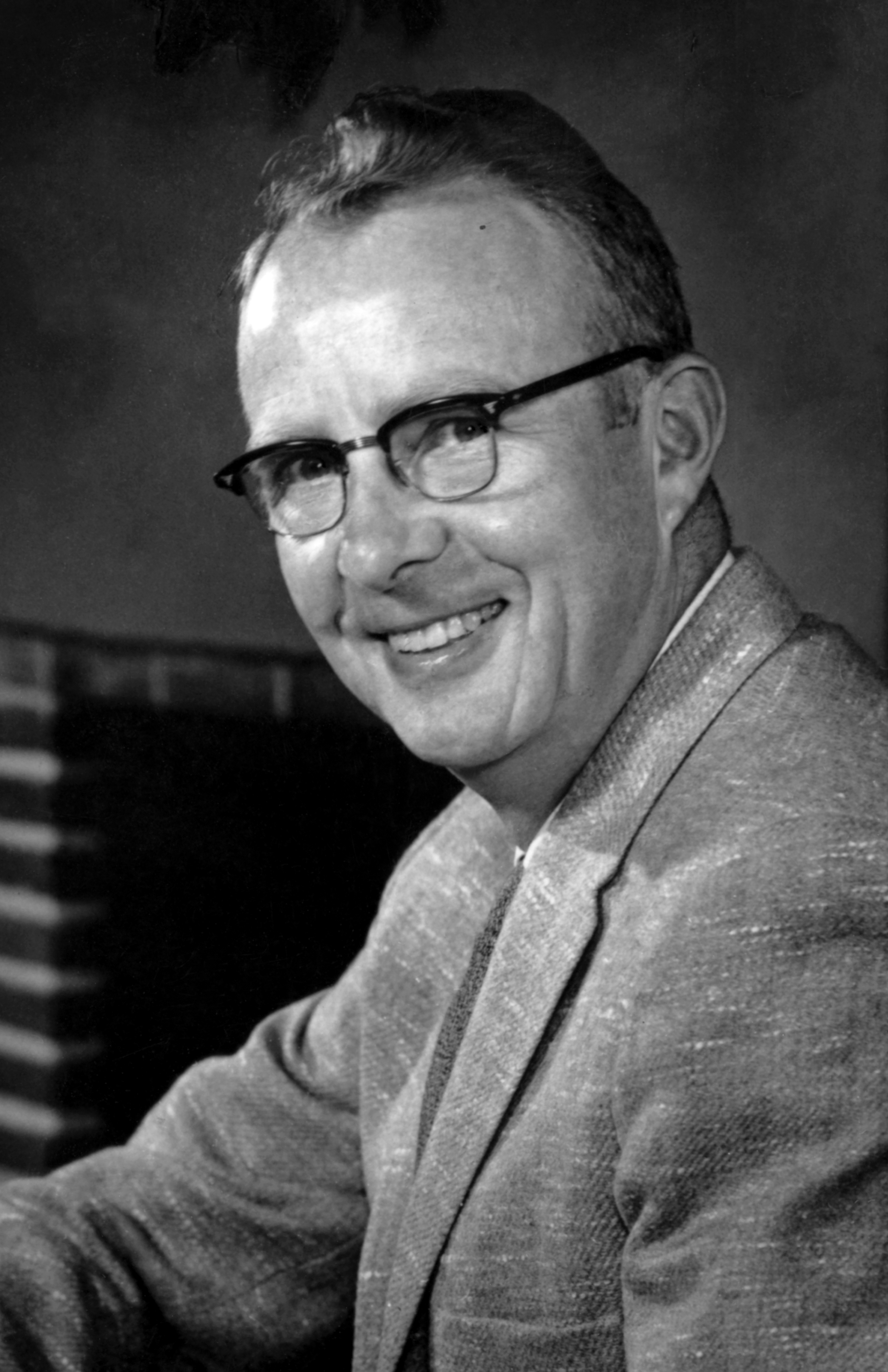
Luis Alvarez

- A conference dedicated to the end-Cretaceous extinction event was held at Utah's Snowbird Ski resort.
- Alexopoulos and others compared quartz grains from rocks that had been subjected to various types of geologic forces like bolide impact, volcanism, or tectonic deformation with quartz from the K–T boundary layer. They found that quartz could exhibit shock fractures resulting from any of the studied forces, but the shock fractures exhibited by the impact site and the K–T boundary were both identical to each other and distinct from those found in the other rocks.
- Felitsyn and Vaganov found high levels of iridium in volcanic ejecta from Kamchatka. This provided evidence that terrestrial geologic processes could leave high levels of iridium behind in the rock record without need for an impact to explain them.
- Kevin O. Pope and Charles Duller presented their discovery of a configuration of small ponds "arranged along the arc of an almost perfect circle" in satellite images of the Yucatan peninsula. Geologist Adriana Ocampo suggested that the arc of ponds may represent the surface evidence of a buried impact crater and the researchers began a collaboration to investigate the possibility.
- Bourgeois and others attributed the Texan turbidite deposit studied by Smit and Romein to a tsunami 50-100m high.
- September 1st: Luis Alvarez died.
- Ward reported that ammonites persisted up to the Cretaceous–Tertiary boundary after all. After finding a partial ammonite fossil "within inches of the boundary" at Zumaya, Ward began prospecting at other places in Europe where the K–T Boundary was exposed. At Hendaye, France he nearly instantly found abundant ammonites near the boundary, leading him to conclude that the scarcity of ammonites at Zumaya was purely local and unrelated to their overall extinction.
- Hickey and Kirk Johnson reported that after studying more than 25,000 plant fossils collected across western North America they had concluded that 79% of contemporary plants went extinct at the Cretaceous–Tertiary boundary. Hickey and Johnson embraced the idea of a catastrophic end-Cretaceous mass extinction after having previously denouncing it. Even Archibald was forced to admit that there had been a catastrophic extinction of plant life at the end of the Cretaceous due to this study.
- Gerta Keller reported her findings on foraminiferans after having collected their fossils from the Brazos region of Texas and El Kef, Tunisia. She found that 35–40% of foraminiferans had gone extinct 300,000–400,000 years prior to the K–T boundary. She argued that this ruled out the possibility that they were victims of a catastrophic mass extinction event.
- Hut and others suggested that the impact at the end of the Cretaceous might actually have been one of a series of impacts that all contributed the Cretaceous–Paleogene extinction event.

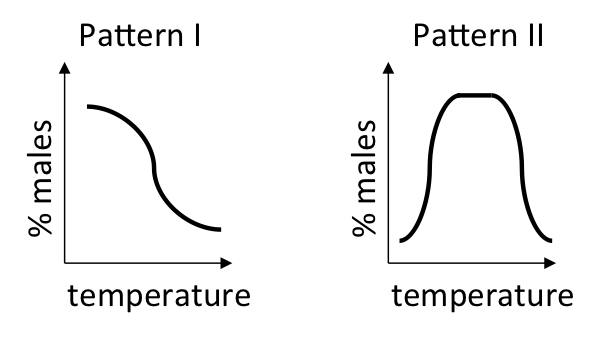
Patterns of temperature-dependent sex-determination in reptiles

==== 1989 ====
- Paladino and others hypothesized that if dinosaurs had temperature-dependent sex determination then rapid climate change at the end of the Cretaceous could have led to strongly imbalanced sex ratios among the ensuing generations. If the male to female ratio was sufficiently imbalanced, there may not have been enough prospective mates to go around and the population could crash, leading to their extinction.
- Gostin and others reported gold and platinum group metals at the 600 million year old site of Acraman crater, Australia. This proved that impact events could introduce elevated iridium levels to the rock record.
- Koeberl reported the presence of high iridium levels in volcanic dust under Antarctic ice. This provided evidence that terrestrial geologic processes could leave high levels of iridium behind in the rock record without need for an impact to explain them.
- June: Alan Hildebrand visited Florentin Maurasse, a geologist who had reported the discovery of intriguing Cretaceous–Tertiary rocks in southern Haiti that Hildebrand hoped may provide evidence for the extinction-triggering impact crater. Hildebrand realized that some samples Maurasse attribute to volcanism were actually evidence of an impact and set out to perform his own field work in Haiti.

=== 1990s ===
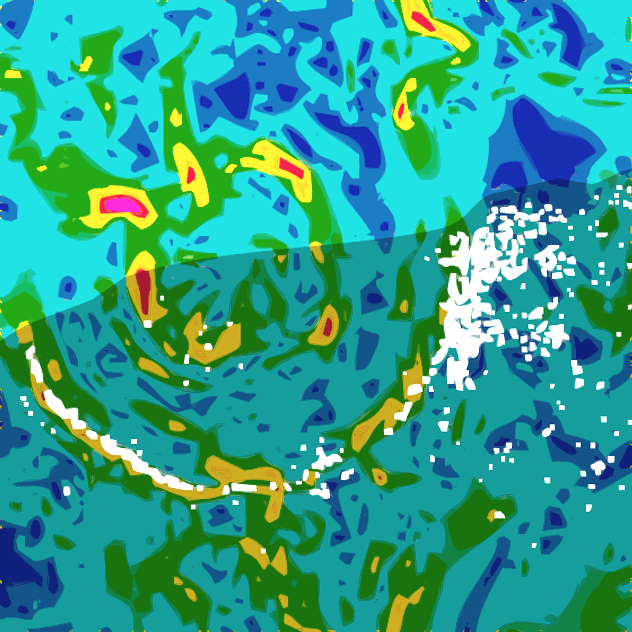
The gravitational anomalies signaling the presence of the Chicxulub Crater

==== 1990 ====
- Courtillot calculated that the volcanism that formed the Deccan Traps may have gradually released as much as two million cubic kilometers of lava spread over a two million square kilometer area. He also dated this volcanic activity paleomagnetostratigraphically from 30 normal to 29 normal. The K–T boundary itself lay at 29 reversed and Courtillot found this to apparently coincide with the peak of Deccan Trap volcanism.
- The Chicxulub Crater in Mexico's Yucatan Peninsula was rediscovered.
- Peter Dodson performed a survey of dinosaur biodiversity and found no support for the hypothesis that the group was in terminal decline during the Late Cretaceous.
- Ursula Marvin argued that the asteroid impact explanation for the end-Cretaceous mass extinction was at odds with the idea of uniformitarianism and criticized those who attempt to reconcile the two as engaging in "newspeak".
- Alvarez and Asaro measured the iridium levels of a 57m span of rock near the K–T boundary at Gubbio once more. They estimate that it took roughly 10 million years for the sediments composing these rocks to be deposited. Their analysis found low iridium levels throughout the sampled interval of strata except at the K–T boundary, where there was a tremendous spike in iridium content accompanied by trivially elevated levels immediately above and below it. James Lawrence Powell characterized their results as consistent with those of the Rocchia team.
- May: Hildebrand and Boynton published the result of a literature search for craters that could have resulted from the end-Cretaceous impact event. They concluded that the best candidate was a buried crater on the seafloor north of Colombia, but noted that the nature of the ejecta preserved at K–T boundary sites around the world are inconsistent with a marine impact. They also briefly mentioned a potential crater reported from the Yucatan Peninsula, but did not examine the possibility in-depth. However, in doing so they "scooped" Pope, Duller, and Ocampo who were completely unaware of Hildebrand and Boynton's work. Pope reached out to Hildebrand, who responded with an unpublished manuscript detailing his intent to name the crater Chicxulub.
- Keith Meldahl verified the Signor–Lipps effect experimentally by taking core samples of mud at a modern tidal flat in Mexico. His samples contained a total of 45 species, of which 35 disappeared from the sample at some point below the top, as if this tidal flat ecosystem was experiencing a gradual mass extinction when in fact every species in the sample was still alive.
- Keller and Barrera published their research indicating that significant foraminiferan extinctions occurring hundreds of thousands of years before the Cretaceous–Tertiary boundary.

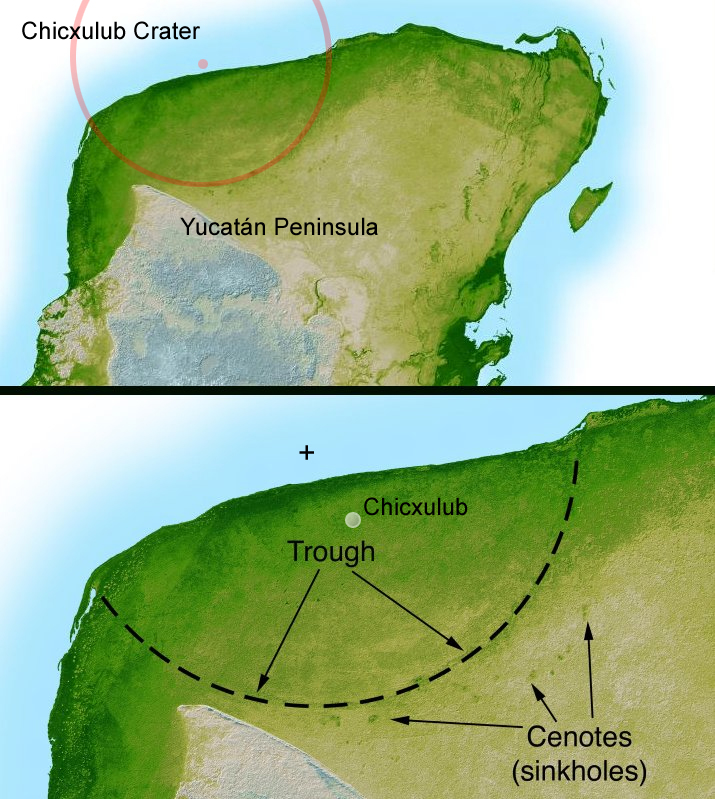
Location of the Chicxulub Crater on the Yucatan Peninsula of Mexico

==== 1991 ====
- Hildebrand and Boynton declared the Chicxulub Crater to be the result of the impact that triggered the mass extinction at the end of the Cretaceous.
- Hildebrand and others estimated the diameter of the Chicxulub Crater at 170 kilometers.
- Sheehan and others collected dinosaur fossils from the lower, middle, and upper Hell Creek Formation in North Dakota and Montana. They found no evidence for a gradual decline in dinosaur biodiversity toward the end of the Late Cretaceous, nor did they find any evidence for a change in the proportions of various dinosaur groups composing the Hell Creek's megafauna. Sheehan and the other researchers concluded that a catastrophic extinction scenario best explained the results of their analysis.
- Carlisle and Braman reported the anomalous presence of tiny diamonds at the K–T boundary in Alberta, Canada. Diamonds like these can form in explosions and are found in meteorites, so diamonds at the K–T boundary support the impact hypothesis.
- Penfield published a letter in Natural History objecting to Hildebrand's claim to have identified the Chicxulub Crater as "ground zero" to the end-Cretaceous mass extinction. He pointed out that he proposed that very hypothesis back in 1981.
- Pope and others finally published their research that had been "scooped" by Hildebrand and Boynton.
- Izett and others radiometrically dated spherules from the K–T boundary of Haiti to an age of 64.5 million years. They found feldspar from the K–T boundary of the Hell Creek Formation to be 64.6 million years old.

Chemical structure of sulfuric acid

==== 1992 ====
- Sigurdsson and others concluded that global mean temperatures dropped 2–3 degrees celsius across the Cretaceous–Tertiary boundary. They also argued that evaporite material ejected from the impact site could have formed sulfuric acid in the atmosphere that would fall back to Earth as acid rain.
- Johnson found that the position of the coal layers once thought to mark the Cretaceous–Tertiary boundary between the Late Cretaceous Hell Creek Formation and Paleocene Tullock Formation may deviate from the actual boundary "by as much as 5 m".
- Officer and others argued that the Chicxulub Crater was formed by volcanic activity rather than an impact event.
- Swisher and others dated the formation of the Chicxulub Crater to 65 million years ago. More precisely, they dated igneous rock from the Chicxulub crater to 64.98 million years ago.
- Sheehan and Fastovsky found terrestrial vertebrates to be the primary victims of the end Cretaceous extinction event, with 88% of their biodiversity lost. Freshwater vertebrates only lost 10% of their biodiversity across the boundary and the researchers found this divide in habitat preference to be the single greatest source of variation in survivorship rates among the taxa they studied. They observed that the better survival rates among aquatic tetrapods as opposed to terrestrial ones was consistent with the idea of an extensive period of darkness following an asteroid impact. This is due to aquatic ecosystems being less dependent on primary productivity than terrestrial ones because many aquatic tetrapods would be able to subsist on detritus and scavenged remains until photosynthesis resumed.
- Smit and others reported the presence of another tsunami deposit at Arroyo el Mimbral, Mexico. Evidence that it formed as a result of a tsunami connected with the end-Cretaceous impact include elevated iridium levels, fossils of terrestrial plants, shocked minerals, and tektites.

Map of New Zealand

==== 1993 ====
- Lecuyer and others concluded that mean temperatures in some areas dropped as much as 8 degrees celsius following the Cretaceous.
- Johnson saw no evidence for any "biotic upheaval" in the fossil pollen and spores of the latest Cretaceous of New Zealand.
- Dewey McLean accused the journal Science of bias favoring the impact hypothesis. He counted a total of 45 pro-impact papers published by the journal since the hypothesis was first proposed in contrast to only four anti-impact papers. Dan Koshland, the journal's editor, denied showing favoritism to either hypothesis.
- Izett and others radiometrically dated the Manson crater again, but found an age of 73.8 million years, too old for it to be the end-Cretaceous impact crater. To confirm this new measurement the team examined rocks of that age in South Dakota. Their fieldwork turned up a layer of shocked minerals, confirming that an impact occurred in the region at that time and thus the revised date was the true age of the Manson crater.
- Blum and others compared the isotope ratios of neodymium, oxygen, and strontium found in the Haitian tektites with the igneous rock from the Chicxulub crater. Their results indicated that the crater and the tektites had identical isotope ratios and they concluded that the tektites and the rock "come from the same source".
- Stinnesbeck and others disputed Smit and others' attribution of the Arroyo el Mimbral deposits to a tsunami and supposed connection to a nearby impact. Instead, they attributed the Arroyo el Mimbral deposits to "coastal sediments [that] slumped into deeper water", a completely mundane occurrence.
- Bohor and others reported the presence of zircon grains at the K–T boundary in Colorado which exhibit similar shock deformation to that commonly reported in quartz grains from the boundary elsewhere. Shocked zircon had never been observed before.
- Krogh and others used Uranium-Lead dating to study zircons from the K–T boundary in Colorado, Haiti, and the Chicxulub crater. They found that the zircons first crystallized 545 million years ago, and experienced a loss of lead during an episode that occurred 65 million years ago. This loss of lead could have been caused by heat from the hypothesized impact event.

The Western Interior Seaway of North America 95 million years ago

==== 1994 ====
- Smith and others concluded that the Late Cretaceous drop in sea levels constituted the most severe marine regression of the entire Mesozoic Era.
- D'Hondt and others argued that an asteroid impact at the end of the Cretaceous would not have produced enough acid for acid rain to be a significant factor contributing to the mass extinction.
- Weil argued that the hypothesis of acid rain occurring in the wake of an asteroid impact contributing the Cretaceous–Tertiary mass extinction was a poor explanation for the which taxa actually survived or perished.
- Askin and others found no evidence for any "biotic upheaval" in the fossil pollen and spores of the latest Cretaceous of Antarctica.
- Popsichal concluded that the extinction of many foraminifera at the end of the Cretaceous occurred abruptly rather than gradually.
- A conference dedicated to the end-Cretaceous extinction event was held in Houston, Texas. During the conference several expert attendees embarked on a field trip to the Mexican Arroyo el Mimbral site to assess whether or not the deposit formed rapidly, as in the tsunami hypothesis or gradually as in the sedimentary slumping hypothesis. Personal accounts on which model was more widely supported among the attendees differ.

==== 1995 ====
- Hurlbert and Archibald argued that the statistical analyses used by Sheehan and others in 1991 were not precise enough to reliably conclude that the make-up of the Hell Creek dinosaur fauna did not change over time. They also argued that the quality of the Hell Creek fossil record was too poor to determine whether or not the extinction of the dinosaurs was gradual or sudden.
- By the end of the year, 50 K–T boundary sites with anomalously high iridium levels had been identified.
- Peucker-Ehrenbrink and others studied osmium isotope ratios from sediments ranging in age from recent to 80 million years old. They found only the osmium at the K–T boundary to preserve an anomalous extraterrestrial-like ratio.
- N. Bhandari and others reported the discovery of the Cretaceous–Tertiary boundary in the Deccan Traps. The Deccan Traps are a series of basalt layers released by intermittent volcanic activity across the Cretaceous–Tertiary boundary. During the periods between eruptions, normal sediments accumulated in deposits called intertrappeans. The basalt deposits can be dated with paleomagnetism and radiometric dating, so the intertrappeans can be dated fairly precisely. Bhandari and the other researchers found the third intertrappean to have been laid down at the K–T Boundary. This intertrappean proved highly significant because this layer alone among the traps contained elevated iridium levels, so the volcanic activity itself could not be the source of the iridium. Further, Intertrappean III preserves dinosaur eggshells, proving that they survived up to the very end of the Cretaceous.
- May: Dewey McLean retired due to ill health. He attributed his medical problems to stress caused by persecution from Luis Alvarez, who McLean claimed had been trying to destroy his career ever since McLean first voiced opposition to the impact hypothesis back in the 1980s.
- Peter Ward criticized the perennial hypothesis that dropping sea levels at the end of the Cretaceous contributed to the extinction of the dinosaurs because there was no known explanation for how lower sea levels could lead to such an extinction.

==== 1996 ====
- Archibald argued that the withdrawal of shallow seas from Earth's continents during the Late Cretaceous reduced the size of and fragmented the coastal plain habitats preferred by large dinosaur species and that this fragmentation may have driven some taxa extinct.

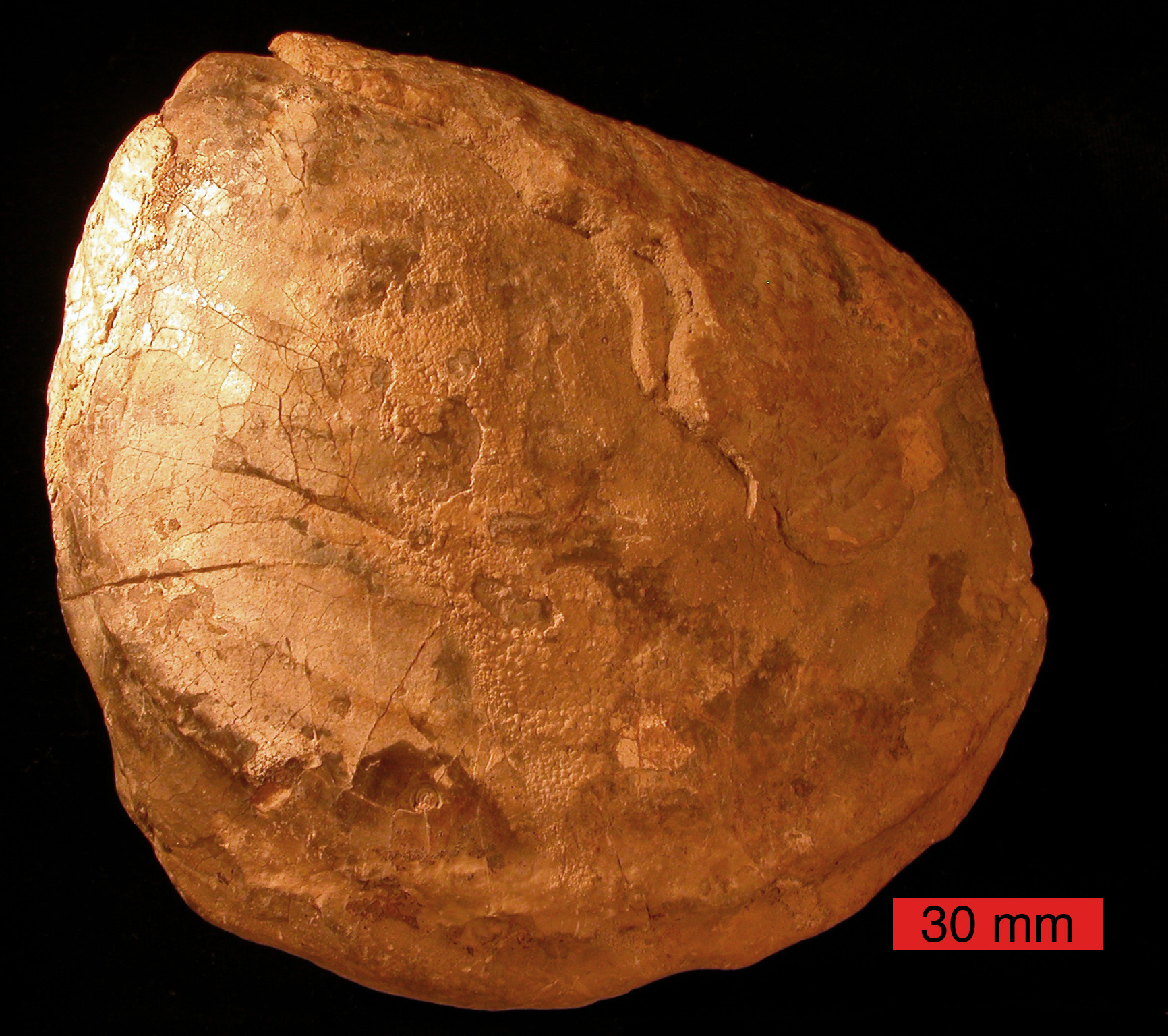
A fossil Inoceramus shell

- D'Hondt and others reinterpreted the carbon isotope data Hsu and others had argued implied the existence of a "Strangelove Ocean" with no primary productivity at the Cretaceous–Tertiary boundary. This reinterpretation concluded that the data actually represented a cessation of carbon transport from the surface to deeper water at that time and that this cessation lasted up to three million years beyond the Cretaceous They also argued that the remains of Cretaceous foraminifera had been physically disturbed and redeposited in Paleocene sediments, creating an illusion of a more gradual extinction than had actually occurred.
- Huber also argued that the remains of Cretaceous foraminifera had been physically disturbed and redeposited in Paleocene sediments, creating an illusion of a more gradual extinction than had actually occurred.
- Macleod and others observed that inoceramid bivalves suffered a significant worldwide episode of extinctions during the mid-Maastrichtian, although not all at exactly the same time.
- Marshall and Ward published a detailed examination of latest Cretaceous ammonite biostratigraphy at Zumaya, Spain. They tracked the survivorship of 28 different ammonite species. They found that of these 28, 6 went extinct significantly before the end of the Cretaceous, 12 survived up to the period's boundary with the Tertiary, and the rest may or may not have perished in between the other extinctions.
- Anbar and others measured the iridium content of modern bodies of water. They found that the K–T boundary preserved 1,000 times as much iridium as is present in all of the world's oceans combined.
- Birger, Schmitz and Asaro re-examined volcanism as a potential source of elevated iridium levels in the rock record. They verified "that some types of explosive volcanism" can release significant quantities of iridium, but argued that levels of other elements in these volcanic ashes distinguish them from impact material. Despite confirming volcanism in general as a potential iridium source, Schmitz and Asaro disputed the validity of certain specific reports of volcanic iridium that had supposedly called the impact hypothesis into question.
- Sharpton and others argued that the Chicxulub crater was actually about 300 km in diameter rather than about 170 km. According to James Lawrence Powell, if this estimate is correct, the Chicxulub crater is one of the largest impact structures in the inner solar system.
- July: Officer and Page published their book, The Great Dinosaur Extinction Controversy.
- The 20 paper anthology Cretaceous Mass Extinctions: Biotic and Environmental Changes was published. The volume was edited by Keller and Macleod who continued to argue that foraminifera were not victims of a catastrophic mass extinction at the end of the Cretaceous.

Sea level over time during the Phanerozoic eon

==== 1997 ====
- Fastovsky and Sheehan argued that there was no evidence for the kind of habitat fragmentation Archibald hypothesized to occur with Late Cretaceous marine regression.
- Ginsburg reported the results of a "blind test" of both sides in the controversy over whether or not foraminifera went extinct gradually or abruptly at the end of the Cretaceous. However, even this blind test proved inconclusive and was unable to settle the controversy between Keller and Smit.
- Albert Hallam and Wignall observed that all five of Earth's mass extinctions were associated with worldwide drops in sea level.

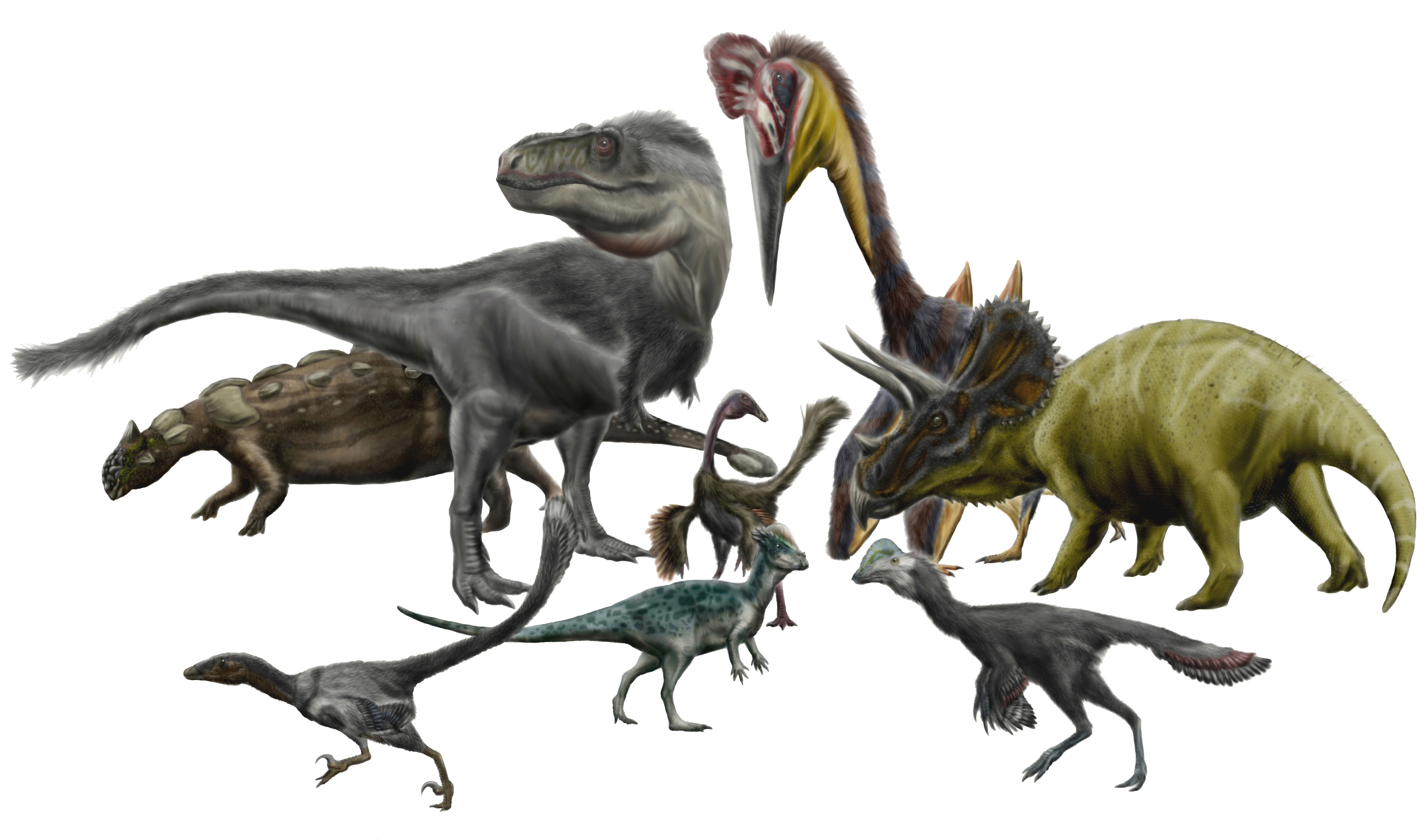
Artistic restorations of various members of the end-Cretaceous Hell Creek paleofauna

- Pope and others estimated that the impact which formed the Chicxulub Cater would have ejected 200 billion tons of sulfur dioxide and water into the atmosphere. They argued that the world would have suffered "a decade of impact winter" in the impact's aftermath.

==== 1998 ====
- Lopez-Martinez and others noted the presence of sauropod and ornithopod tracks near the K–T boundary in the Tremp Formation of northeastern Spain. The presence of tracks so close to the Cretaceous–Tertiary suggests that the dinosaur died out rapidly rather than gradually.
- Sullivan argued that dinosaur biodiversity experienced a marked decline over the last ten million years of the Cretaceous Period.
- Stromberg and others reported that fossil pollen from the Hell Creek Formation provided evidence for a gradual shift in the region's flora "from more open to more closed and moist habitats".

==== 1999 ====
- Norris and others concluded that the extinction of many foraminifera at the end of the Cretaceous was abrupt rather than gradual.

== 21st century ==
=== 2000s ===
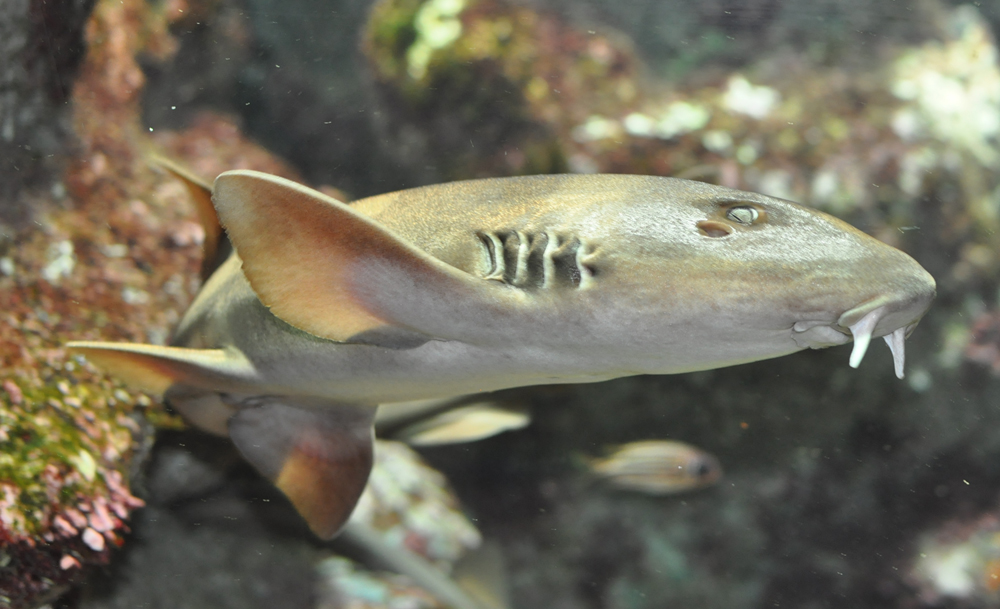
A modern member of the shark genus Chiloscyllium, which survived the Cretaceous–Paleogene extinction event

==== 2000 ====
- Hoganson found evidence for elasmobranch extinctions at the K–T boundary.

==== 2001 ====
- Pearson and others published the results of their field work aimed at studying vertebrates near the K–T boundary. Their findings were consistent with the impact hypothesis.

==== 2002 ====
- Pope argued that the amount of dust supposedly kicked up by the asteroid impact at the end of the Cretaceous had been overestimated by a factor of nearly one hundred and the idea that this dust blotted out the sun and halted photosynthesis was no longer a viable explanation for the extinction event at the end of the period.
- Pearson and others published the results of their field work aimed at studying vertebrates near the K–T boundary. Their findings were consistent with the impact hypothesis.

=== 2010s ===
==== 2010 ====
- An international panel of researchers concluded that an impact best explained the extinction event and that Chicxulub was indeed the resulting crater.

==== 2013 ====
- Prior to 2013, the Cretaceous–Paleogene extinction that resulted from the Chicxulub impact was commonly cited as having happened about 65 million years ago, but a 2013 paper by Renne et al. gave an updated value of 66 million years.

==== 2016 ====
- A drilling project into the Chicxulub peak ring confirmed that the peak ring comprised granite ejected within minutes from deep in the Earth (rather than usual seafloor rock), and evidence of colossal seawater movement directly afterwards (from layered sand deposits). Crucially, the cores also showed a near-complete absence of gypsum, the usual sea floor mineral in the region, which is sulfate-containing; this would have been vaporized and dispersed as an aerosol into the atmosphere, providing evidence of a probable link between the impact and a global scale of longer-term effects on the climate and food chain.

==== 2019 ====
- A study aiming to quantify the habitat of latest Cretaceous North American dinosaurs, based on data from fossil occurrences and climatic and environmental modelling, and evaluating its implications for inferring whether dinosaur diversity was in decline prior to the Cretaceous–Paleogene extinction event, was published by Chiarenza et al. (March 2019).
- A study on the drivers and tempo of biotic recovery after Cretaceous–Paleogene mass extinction, as indicated by data from the Corral Bluffs section of the Denver Basin (Colorado, United States), is published by Lyson et al. (October 2019).
- Researchers report that the Cretaceous Chicxulub asteroid impact that resulted in the extinction of non-avian dinosaurs 66 million years ago, also rapidly acidified the oceans producing ecological collapse and long-lasting effects on the climate, and was a key reason for end-Cretaceous mass extinction.
- Researchers find evidence that the carbon dioxide concentration in the oceans rose before the asteroid impact that caused the extinction of non-avian dinosaurs. This was likely caused by long-term volcanic eruptions from the Deccan Traps and acidified the oceans already before the asteroid impact. Their results might inform preparations for consequences of contemporary human-caused climate change in the Earth system and were made possible by a new method for analyzing the calcium isotope composition of fossilized sea shells.

=== 2020s ===
==== 2020 ====
- Hull et al. reported data from marine microfossils, carbon cycle modeling and paleotemperature records showing that the Cretaceous–Paleogene Mass Extinction about 66 million years ago was mostly a result of a meteorite impact (the Chicxulub impactor) and not a result of volcanism.
- In a study published by Chiarenza et al. (2020) the two main hypotheses for the mass extinction (the Deccan Traps and the Chicxulub impact) were evaluated using Earth System and Ecological modelling, confirming that the asteroid impact was the main driver of this extinction while the volcanism might have boosted the recovery instead.
- Scientists reported that bird skull evolution likely decelerated compared with the evolution of their dinosaur predecessors after the extinction event, rather than accelerating as often believed to have caused the cranial shape diversity of modern birds.
- Simulations by Imperial College London revealed that the Chicxulub impactor may have produced a "worst case" scenario in terms of lethality for the dinosaurs, arriving from the north-east at a 60° angle, which maximised the amount of gases and debris thrown up into Earth's atmosphere.

==== 2021 ====
- Scientists report that the impactor that led to the demise of the dinosaurs 66 million years ago may have been a fragment from a disrupted comet, rather than an asteroid which has long been the leading candidate among scientists.
- Scientists reported that the event gave rise to neotropical rainforest biomes like the Amazonia, replacing species composition and structure of local forests. During ~6 million years of recovery to former levels of plant diversity, they evolved from widely spaced gymnosperm-dominated forests to the forests with thick canopies which block sunlight, prevalent flowering plants and high vertical layering as known today.
- Scientists report that the impactor possibly was an outer main-belt asteroid, a carbonaceous chondrite C-type asteroid.

==== 2022 ====
- A study shows that, contrary to widespread belief, body sizes of mammal extinction survivors of the extinction event were the first to evolutionarily increase, with brain sizes increasing only later in the Eocene.
- The first known dinosaur fossil linked to the very day of the Chicxulub impact studied by paleontologists at the Tanis site in North Dakota is reported, with the first reports about the site being from 2019.

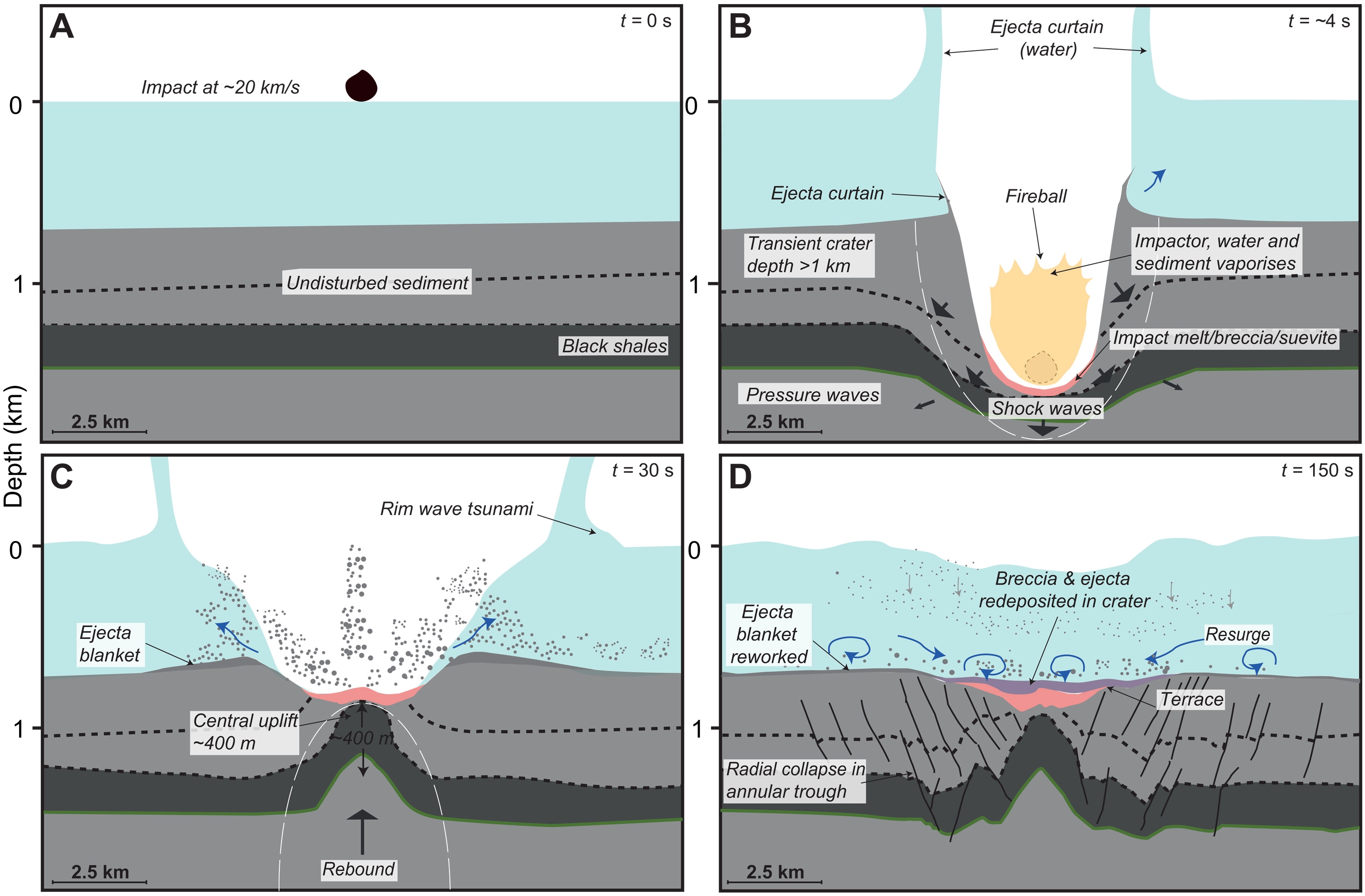
Conceptual model of the impact sequence at the Nadir impact site, based on seismic observations and analog models

- The Nadir crater, possibly the result of a second, smaller asteroid that struck around the same time as the Chicxulub impact, is identified and described by researchers.
- A study indicates a substantial decline in dinosaur biodiversity millions of years before the Cretaceous-Paleogene extinction event, affirming a study from 2021.

== See also ==
- History of paleontology
  - Timeline of paleontology
