= Sharpton =

Sharpton is a surname. Notable people with the surname include:

- Al Sharpton (born 1954), American Baptist minister
- Virgil L. Sharpton (born 1948), American professor
- Darryl Sharpton (born 1988), American football player
