= Daniel I. Axelrod =

American paleoecologist (1910–1998)

Daniel Isaac Axelrod (July 16, 1910 – June 2, 1998) was an American paleoecologist specializing in Tertiary Cordilleran floras, in particular correlating fossil evidence of specific floras with climate change indicators.

== Biography ==
He received his A.B. in botany, and an M.A. and Ph.D. in paleobotany from the University of California at Berkeley. He served in the United States Army during World War II performing strategic analysis of aerial photographs of terrane. After the war he was hired as an assistant professor of geology at the University of California, Los Angeles. He eventually became a full professor of both geology and botany at UCLA before moving to the University of California, Davis as a professor of paleoecology late in his career. He became professor emeritus at Davis in 1976. He was elected a Fellow of the American Academy of Arts and Sciences in 1981.

His collections of fossil type floras are housed at the University of California Museum of Paleontology

== Awards ==
- Hayden Memorial Geological Award, 1979
- Paleontological Society Medal, 1990

== See also ==
- Harry Paul Bailey
