= Harry Paul Bailey =

American earth scientist (1913–1979)

Harry Paul Bailey

Harry Paul Bailey (1913 - 15 December 1979) was professor of earth sciences at University of California, Riverside. He collaborated with Daniel I. Axelrod, combining his own climatological work with Axelrod's paleobotanical research. He was a Guggenheim fellow in 1958.

== Selected publications ==
- The climate of Southern California. University of California Press, Berkeley & Los Angeles, 1966. (California natural history guides No. 17) ISBN
