= Virgil L. Sharpton =

- Education: Grand Valley State University (B.S., 1979), Brown University (M.S. 1981; Ph.D., 1984)
- Known for: Remote sensing, Planetary geology and Impact cratering
- Scientific career
- Fields: Synthetic aperture radar: multispectral and other remotely acquired image data sets; image processing; and instrumental geochemical techniques
- Workplaces: University of Alaska Fairbanks, Lunar and Planetary Institute

Virgil L. (Buck) Sharpton is the Associate Director for Science at the Lunar and Planetary Institute (LPI) in Houston, Texas. Prior to joining the LPI in 2011, he was Vice Chancellor for Research at the University of Alaska Fairbanks (UAF). He is also the founder and former director of the Geographic Information Network of Alaska (GINA) which provides access to university data and information services across the state.

== Education ==
Sharpton earned a B.S. with high honors in Geology at Grand Valley State University in 1979 and a M.S. and a Ph.D. in Geological Sciences at Brown University in 1981 and 1984, respectively.

== Career ==
After receiving his Ph.D. in Geological Sciences, from 1984 to 1986 Sharpton was a Natural Sciences and Engineering Research Council Post Doctoral Fellow for the Geological Survey of Canada. He became a Senior Staff Scientist at the Lunar and Planetary Institute affiliated with the NASA Lyndon B. Johnson Space Center and served there for 14 years. He joined the faculty at the UAF in 1998 with a joint appointment between the Geophysical Institute and the Department of Geology and Geophysics at the College of Natural Science and Mathematics and was awarded tenure in 2000. In 2001 he was awarded one of the six presidential professorships across the University of Alaska system and held the title of President's Professor of Remote Sensing. In May 2005 he was named Vice Chancellor for Research at the UAF.

As Vice Chancellor for Research, he assisted the Chancellor in setting the research agenda at the university. He managed the Center for Research Services, Geophysical Institute, International Arctic Research Center, Office of Electronic Miniaturization, Institute of Arctic Biology, and various research programs. Sharpton also served as the university representative to the Arctic Research Consortium of the United States (ARCUS), Inland Northwest Research Alliance (INRA), and University Corporation for Atmospheric Research (UCAR).

Sharpton worked closely with several government agencies in developing new uses for satellite remote sensing and information management and led the data retrieval and management activities of the State Committee on Research (SCoR). He worked through the Governor's Office to identify ways that the capabilities centered at the university could be utilized more effectively within state agencies. He became a member of Governor Sarah Palin’s Climate Change Sub-Cabinet and sat on a variety of NASA review panels as well as state and local advisory boards.

He joined the LPI in November 2011 and in June 2012 became its Associate Director for Science.

== Awards and honors ==
In addition to being awarded the President's Professorship at the UAF, his honors include

- Tulip City Rock and Mineral Club Award (1979)
- William F. Malar Scholarship (1981–1984)
- Government of Canada Group Achievement Award (1992)
- NASA Group Achievement Award (1992)
- Geophysical Institute Director's Faculty Achievement Award (2001)
- AmericaView's Legacy Award for leadership (2006)
