= Noroeste =

Noroeste might refer to:

== Geography ==
- Noroeste Rio-Grandense, in Brazil
- Colón Centro y Noroeste, in Uruguay
- Cerro Noroeste, in the United States
- Noroeste, Yucatán, in Mexico
- Plaza Noroeste, in Puerto Rico

== Sport ==
- Esporte Clube Noroeste, Brazilian football club
- Real Noroeste Capixaba Futebol Clube, Brazilian football club
- Torneo del Noroeste, Argentine rugby tournament
- Liga de Béisbol del Noroeste de México, Mexican baseball league

== Other ==
- Aviación del Noroeste, Mexican airline
- Astilleros y Talleres del Noroeste, Spanish shipbuilders
