= Chicxulub (disambiguation) =

Chicxulub may refer to:

- Chicxulub crater, on the Yucatán Peninsula, in Mexico
- Chicxulub Pueblo, a town on the Yucatán Peninsula
- Chicxulub Pueblo Municipality, which includes the town
- Chicxulub Puerto, a coastal village in Progreso Municipality, Yucatán
