= Chicxulub Puerto =

Coastal town in Progreso Municipality, Yucatán, Mexico

Coordinates: 21°17′37″N 89°36′21″W

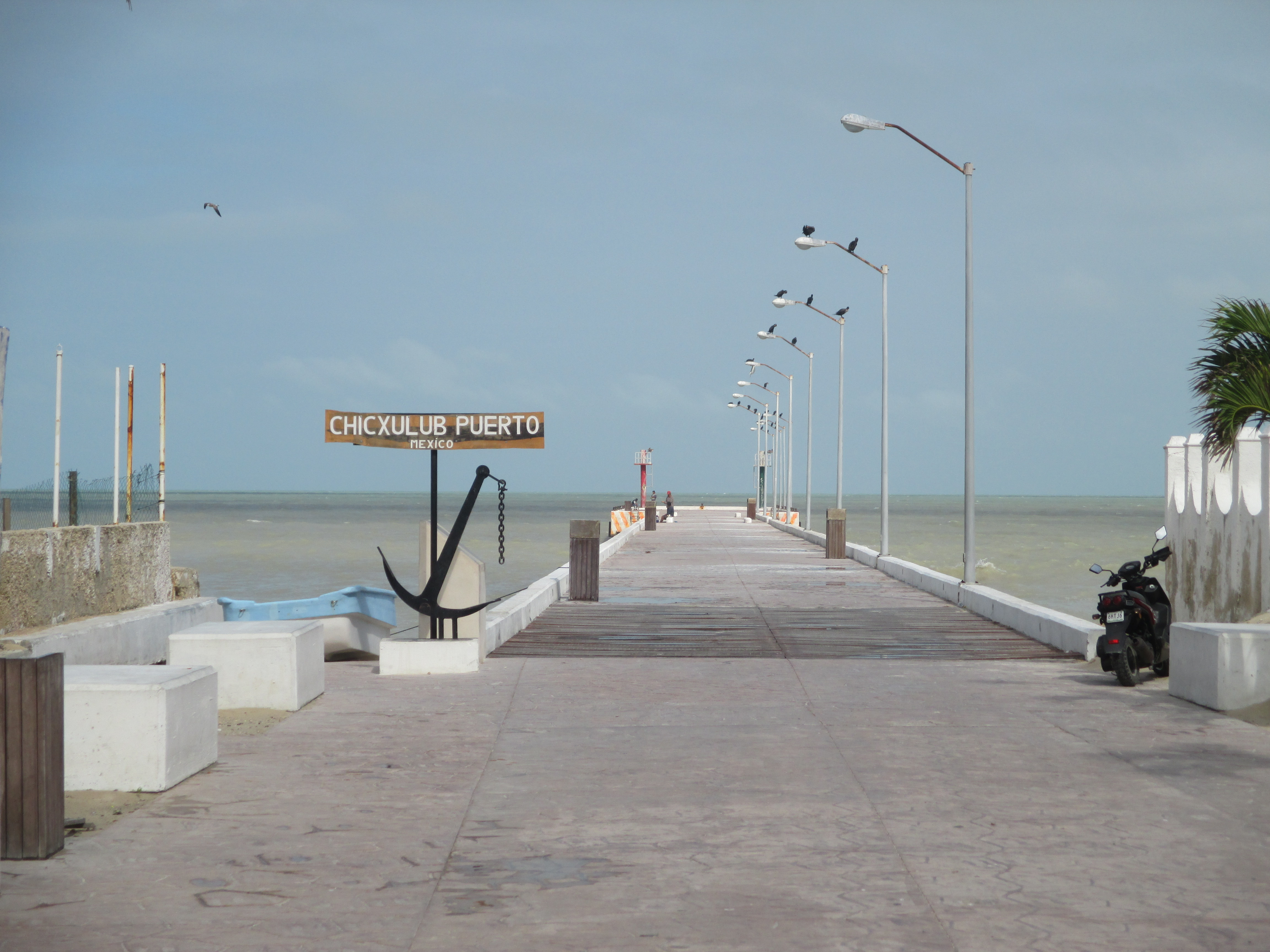
The center of the Chicxulub Impact Crater (approx 21°20'N 89°30'W) is off the Yucatan coast, near Chicxulub Puerto.

Chicxulub Puerto (Spanish: [tʃikʃuˈlub ˈpweɾto]) is a small coastal town in Progreso Municipality in the Mexican state of Yucatán. It is located on the Gulf of Mexico, in the northwestern region of the state about 8 km (5 mi) east of the city port of Progreso, the municipality seat, and 42 km (26 mi) north of the city of Mérida, the state capital. According to the INEGI census conducted in 2020, the port town had a population of 7,591 inhabitants.

Chicxulub Puerto is most famous for being near the geographic center of the Chicxulub crater, an impact crater discovered by geologists on the Yucatán Peninsula and extending into the ocean. It was created by the impact some 66 million years ago of the Chicxulub impactor, an asteroid or comet which caused the Cretaceous–Paleogene extinction event, which led to the extinction of all non-avian dinosaurs. Chicxulub Puerto lies almost exactly on the geographic center of the crater, and has used its notoriety for tourism, having opened tourist attractions such as a museum dedicated to the meteor impact.

The town of Chicxulub Pueblo, located farther inland in the peninsula, is often confused with this coastal town.

The name Chicxulub is from the Yucatec Maya language meaning 'the devil's flea'.
