= Chicxulub Pueblo =

Town in the Mexican state of Yucatán

- Municipal Seat
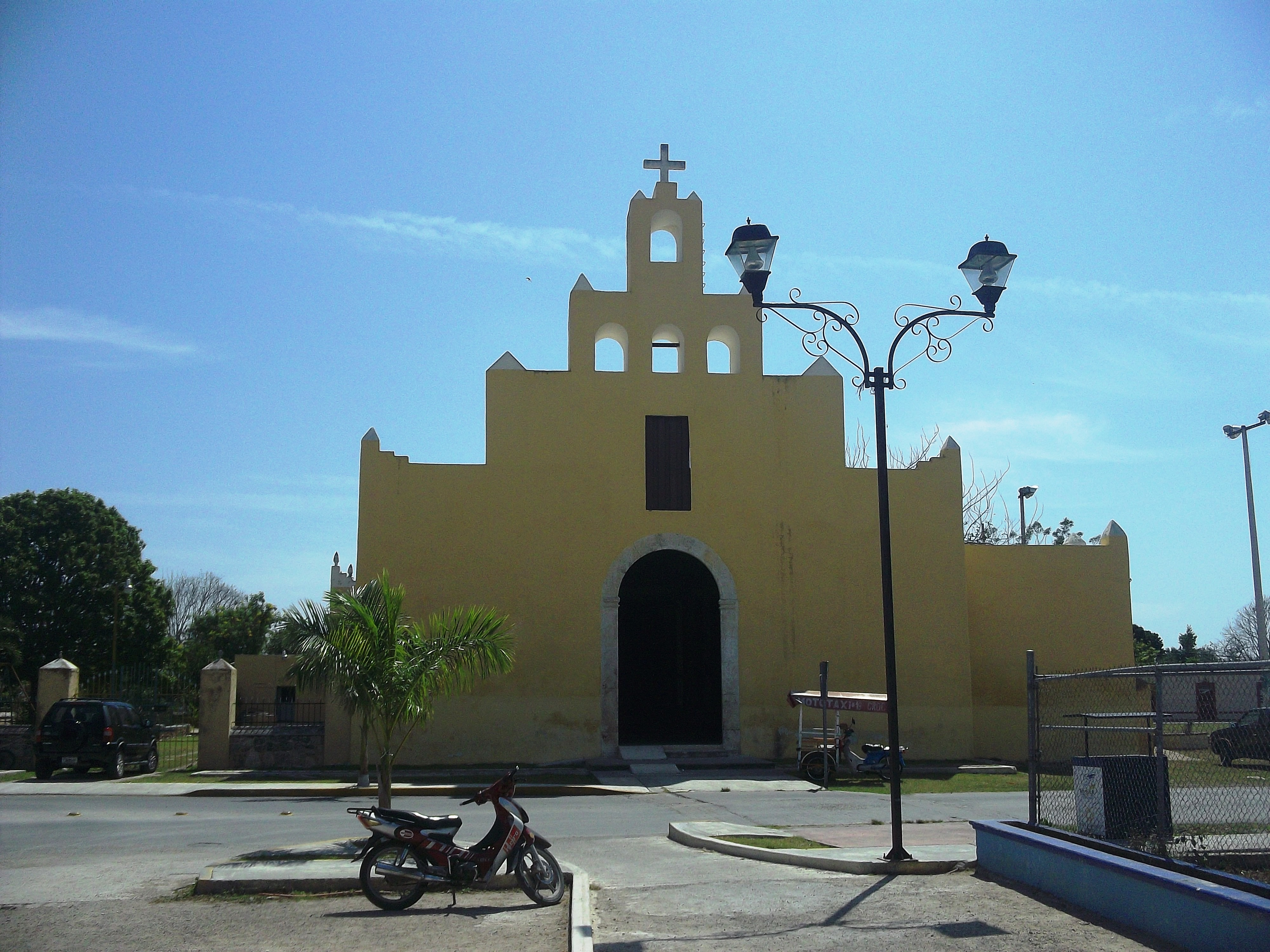

- Location within Yucatán (state)
- Coordinates: 21°8′11″N 89°31′0″W
- Country: Mexico
- State: Yucatán
- Municipality: Chicxulub Pueblo
- Elevation: 8 m (26 ft)

Population (2010)
  - Total: 4,080
- Time zone: UTC−6 (Central Standard Time)
- Postal code: 97340
- Area code: 985
- INEGI code: 310200001

Chicxulub Pueblo (Yucatec Maya: Ch’ik Xulub, Mayan pronunciation: [t͡ʃʼik ʃuluɓ]) is a town, and surrounding municipality of the same name, in the Mexican state of Yucatán.

At the census of 2010, the town had a population of 4,080 people.

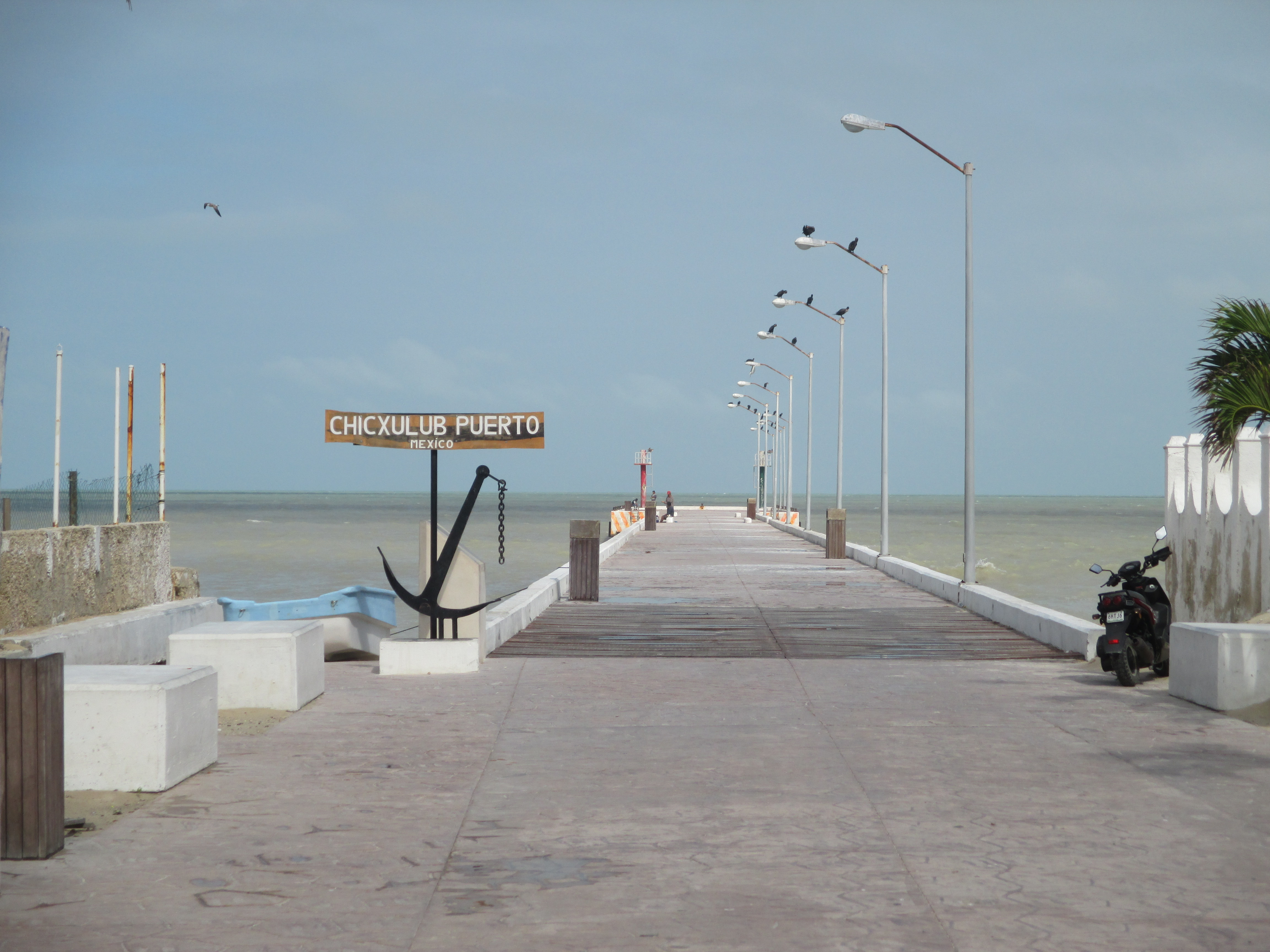
The center of the Chicxulub Impact Crater (approx 21°20'N 89°30'W) is off the Yucatan coast, near Chicxulub Puerto

Chicxulub is most famous for being near the geographic center of the Chicxulub crater, an impact crater discovered by geologists on the Yucatán Peninsula and extending into the ocean. It was created by the impact some 66 million years ago of the Chicxulub impactor, an asteroid or comet which caused the Cretaceous–Paleogene extinction event, which led to the extinction of the non-avian dinosaurs, pterosaurs and other animals that dominated the Mesozoic. The coastal village (or puerto) of Chicxulub, in the neighboring municipality of Progreso, lies almost exactly on the geographic center of the crater.

The name Chicxulub is from the Yucatec Maya language. There is a small debate about the meaning of the name of the town. It may come from ch'íik xulub, which could mean "place of the sharp horn," or "place where the devil fell," or it may come from ch'ik xulub, which is "the devil's flea."
