= Fern spike =

Geologically-rapid increase in fern abundance after extinction events

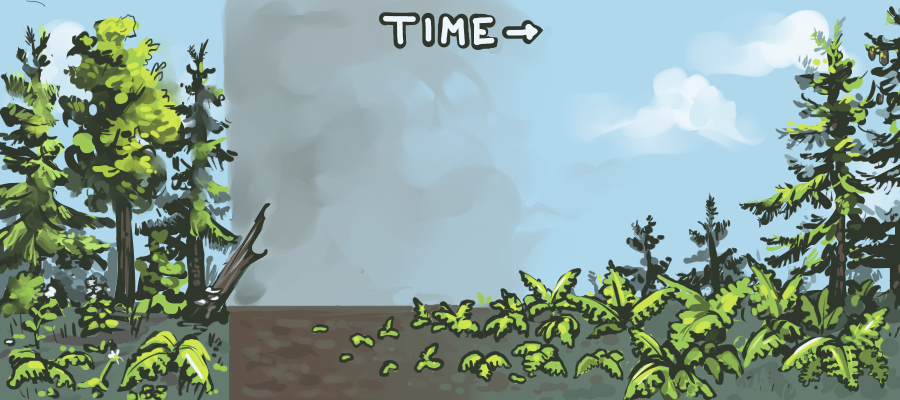
Succession of an ecosystem following disturbance, in the form of a fern spike.

In paleontology, a fern spike is the occurrence of unusually high spore abundance of ferns in the fossil record, usually immediately (in a geological sense) after an extinction event. The spikes are believed to represent a large, temporary increase in the number of ferns relative to other terrestrial plants after the extinction or thinning of the latter. Fern spikes are strongly associated with the Cretaceous–Paleogene extinction event, although they have been found in other points of time and space such as at the Triassic-Jurassic boundary. Outside the fossil record, fern spikes have been observed to occur in response to local extinction events, such as the 1980 Mount St. Helens eruption.

== Causes ==
Extinction events have historically been caused by massive environmental disturbances, such as meteor strikes. Volcanic eruptions can also wipe out local ecosystems through pyroclastic flows and landslides, leaving the ground bare for new colonization. For a population to recover and thrive after such an event, it must be able to tolerate the conditions of the disturbed environment. Ferns have multiple characteristics which predispose them to grow in those environments.

=== Spore characteristics ===
Plants generally reproduce with spores or seeds, meaning those will be what germinates in a disaster's aftermath. But spores have advantages over seeds in the environmental conditions produced by a disaster. They are generally produced in higher numbers than seeds, and are smaller, aiding wind dispersal. While many wind-dispersed pollens of seed plants are smaller and farther dispersed than spores, pollen cannot germinate into a plant and must land in a receptive flower. Some seed plants also require animals to disperse their seeds, which may not be present after a disaster. These characteristics allow ferns to rapidly colonize an area with their spores.

Fern spores require light to germinate. Following major disturbances that clear or reduce plant life, the ground would receive ample sunlight that may promote spore germination. Some species' spores contain chlorophyll, which hastens germination and may aid rapid colonization of cleared ground.

=== Environmental tolerance ===
After the eruption of El Chichón, the fern Pityrogramma calomelanos was observed to regenerate from rhizomes buried by ash, even though the plants' leaves were destroyed. The rhizomes tolerated exposure to heat and sulfur from the volcanic matter. Their survival suggests resilience of ferns to the harsh environmental conditions imposed by certain kinds of disasters, and rhizome regeneration may have been a factor in fern recovery after other environmental events.

=== Ecology ===
Fern spikes follow the pattern of ecological succession. In the past and in modern times, ferns have been observed to act as pioneer species. Eventually, their abundance at a site decreases as other plants such as gymnosperms begin to grow.

=== Spore availability ===
Fern spikes cannot occur without ferns already existing in the area, so spikes occur primarily in regions where ferns are already a prominent part of the ecosystem. At the Cretaceous-Paleogene extinction event, a fern spike occurred in the New Zealand area, where ferns made up 25% of plant abundance pre-extinction. After the event, fern abundance increased to 90%.

== Detection ==
Prehistoric fern spikes can be detected by sampling sediment. Sources include sediment that has been accumulating in a lake since the event of interest and sedimentary rocks such as sandstone. Because sediment accumulates over time and thus shows superposition, layers can be assigned to certain times. Spore concentration in a layer can be compared to the concentration at different times, and concentration of other particles such a pollen grains. A fern spike is characterized by a suddenly higher abundance of fern spores following a disaster, generally accompanied by a decrease in other plant species as indicated by their pollen. Eventually fern abundance will decrease, hence the term "spike" describing the pattern.

Modern fern spikes can simply be directly observed, and allow for observation of factors contributing to the spike that may not be detectable otherwise, such as rhizomes persisting in ash.

== Significance ==
Because fern spikes generally coincide with certain disasters such as meteorite strikes and volcanic eruptions, their presence in the fossil record can indicate those events. A fern spike is believed to support a meteorite impact as cause of the Triassic-Jurassic extinction event, similar to the one later causing extinction at the end of the Cretaceous period.

== Known events ==
A fern spike followed a fungal spike after the Permian–Triassic extinction event (252 Ma). It has been observed in Australia.

After the Triassic-Jurassic extinction event (201.3 Ma), ferns drastically increased in abundance while seed plants became scarce. The spike has been detected in eastern North America and Europe.

A very widespread fern spike occurred after the Cretaceous–Paleogene extinction event (66 Ma). The spike has been predominantly observed in North America, with just one observance outside the continent in Japan.

Fern spikes today are often observed after volcanic eruptions. The areas affected by the eruptions of Mount St. Helens (May 18, 1980) and El Chichón (March—April 1982) exhibited such a pattern.

== See also ==
- Ecological succession
- Paleoecology
- Pioneer species
