= Cretaceous–Paleogene extinction event =

Mass extinction event about 66 million years ago

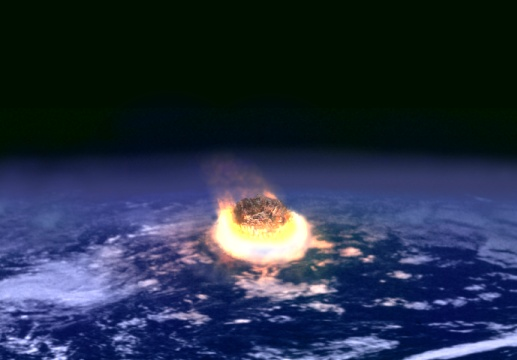
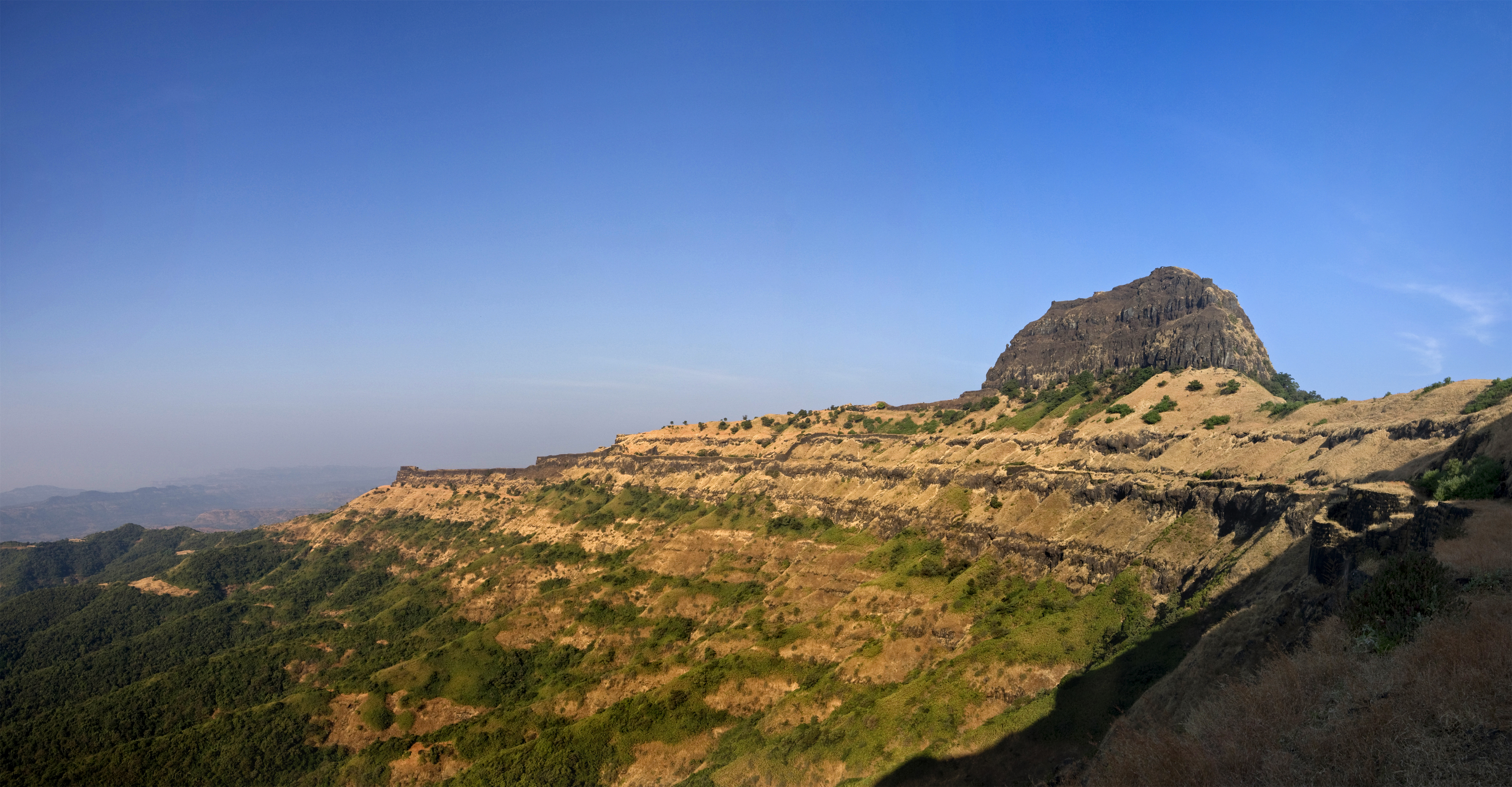
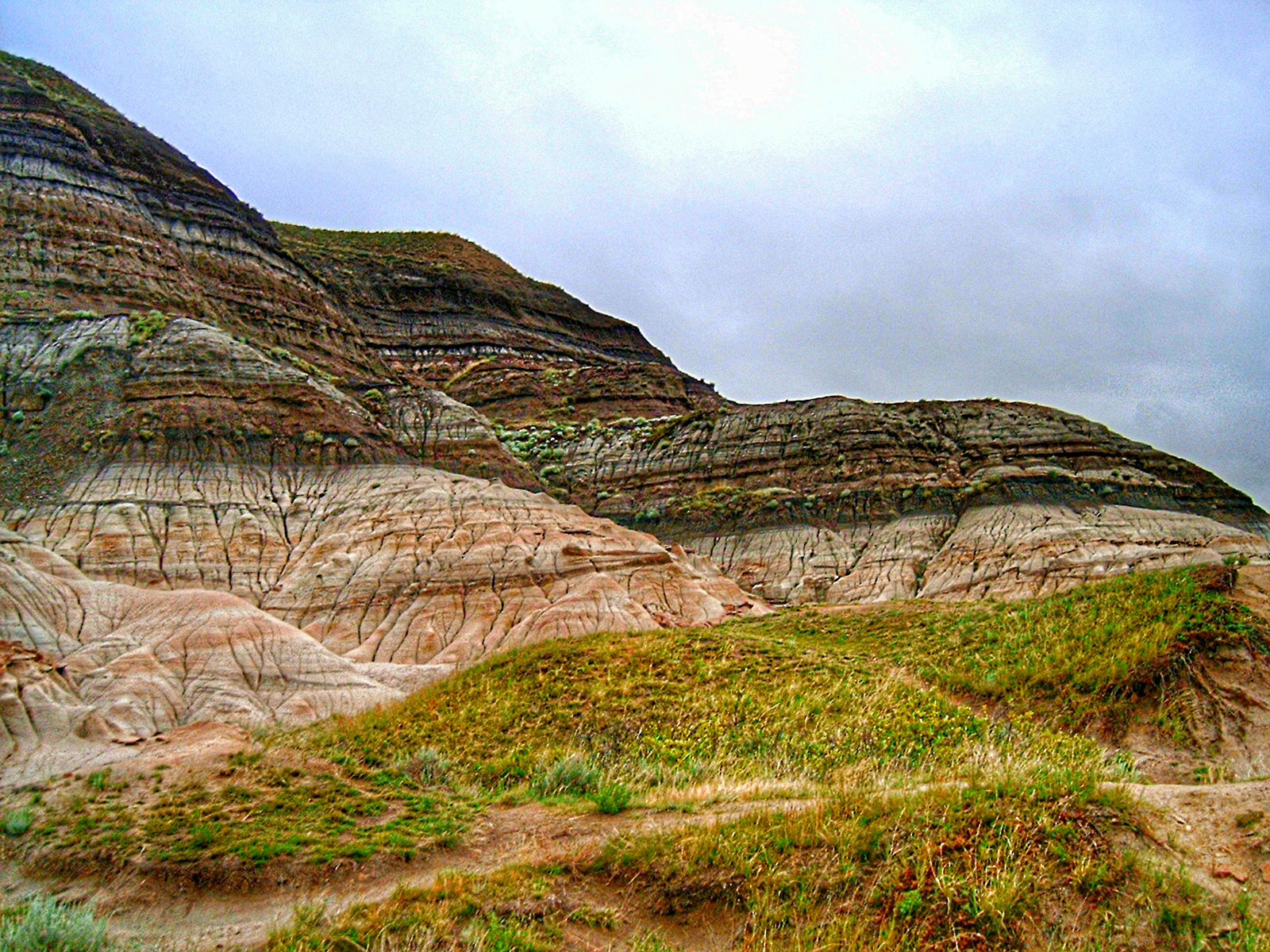
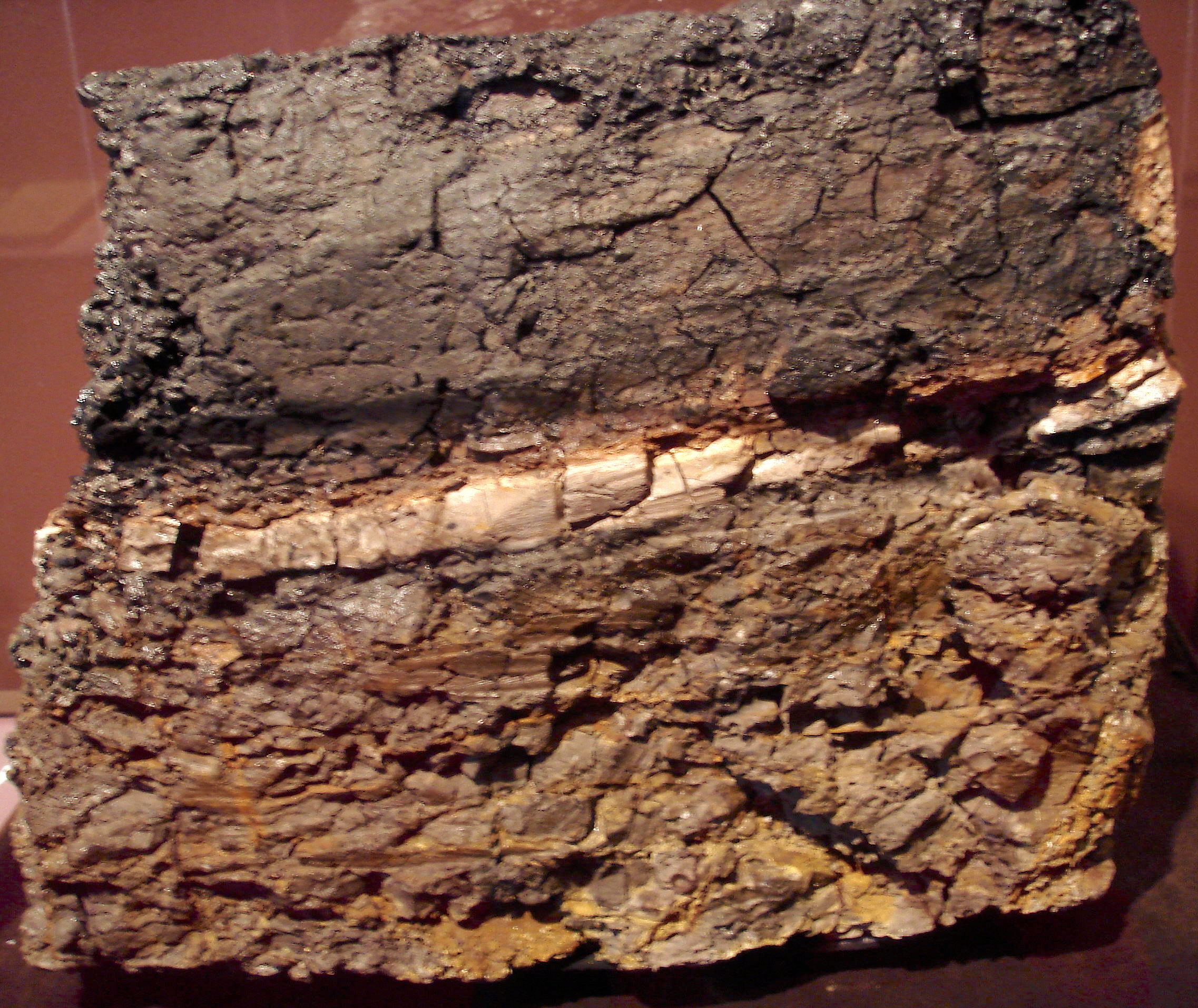
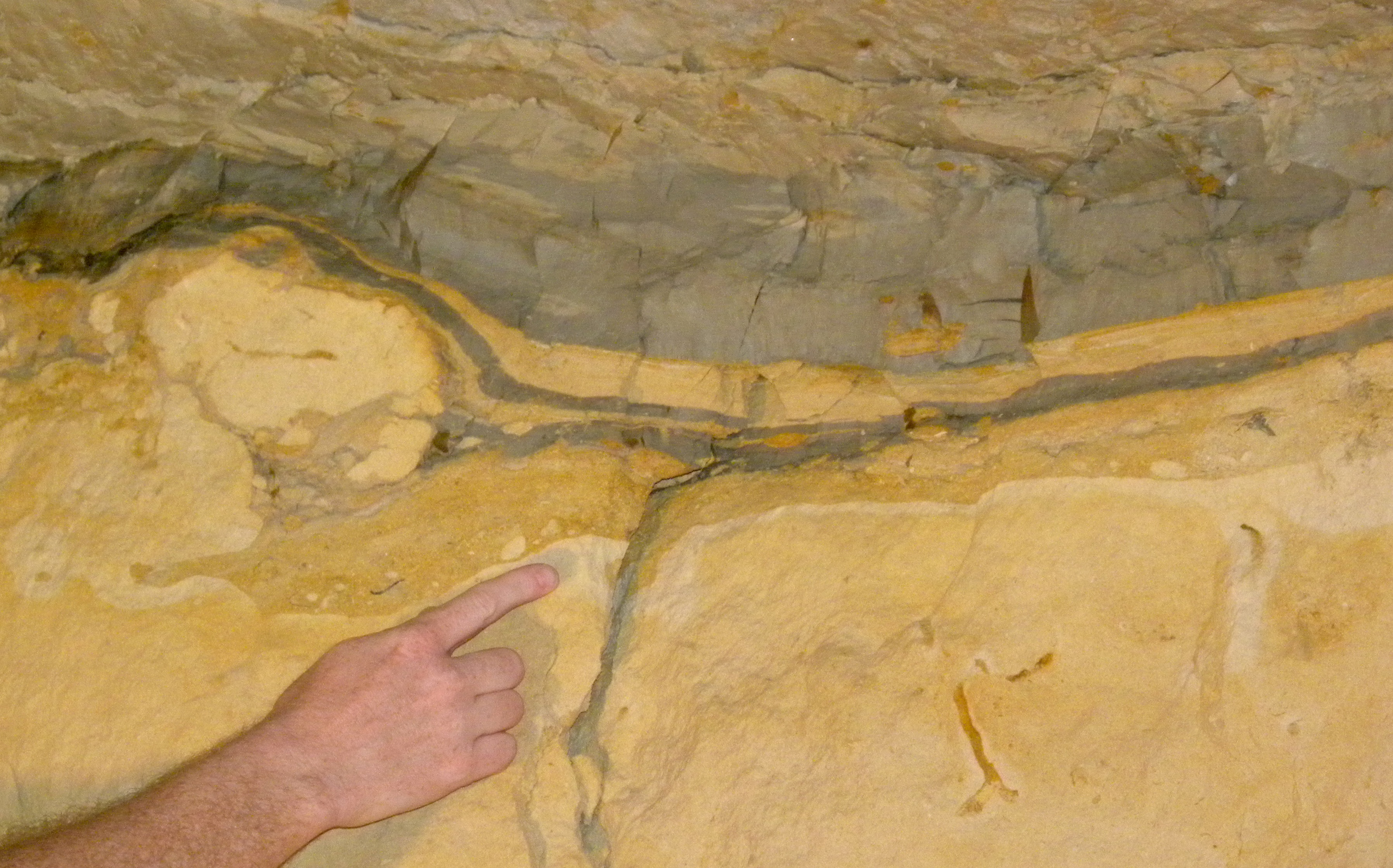
Clockwise from the top:
- Artist's rendering of an asteroid a few kilometers across colliding with the Earth. Such an impact would have released the equivalent energy of several million nuclear weapons detonating simultaneously;
- Badlands near Drumheller, Alberta, where erosion has exposed the K–Pg boundary;
- Complex Cretaceous–Paleogene clay layer (gray) in the Geulhemmergroeve tunnels near Geulhem, The Netherlands (finger is just below the actual Cretaceous–Paleogene boundary);
- Wyoming rock with an intermediate claystone layer that contains 1,000 times more iridium than the upper and lower layers. Picture taken at the San Diego Natural History Museum;
- Rajgad Fort's Citadel, an eroded hill from the Deccan Traps, which are another hypothesized cause of the K–Pg extinction event.

The Cretaceous–Paleogene (K–Pg) extinction event, (Note: The abbreviation is derived from the juxtaposition of K, the common abbreviation for the Cretaceous, which in turn originates from the correspondent German term Kreide; and Pg, which is the abbreviation for the Paleogene.) formerly known as the Cretaceous–Tertiary (K–T) extinction event, (Note: The former designation includes the term 'Tertiary' (abbreviated as T), which is now discouraged as a formal geochronological unit by the International Commission on Stratigraphy.) was a major mass extinction of three-quarters (75%) of the plant and animal species on Earth which occurred around 65.5 million years ago. The event caused the extinction of dinosaurs and most other tetrapods weighing more than 25 kg (55 lb), excepting some ectothermic species such as sea turtles and crocodilians. It marked the ends of both the Cretaceous period and the Mesozoic era, and the beginning of the current geological era, the Cenozoic era.

In the geologic record, the K–Pg event is marked by a thin layer of sediment called the K–Pg boundary or K–T boundary, which can be found throughout the world in marine and terrestrial rocks. The boundary clay shows unusually high levels of the metal iridium, which is more common in asteroids than in the Earth's crust.

It is generally thought that the K–Pg extinction resulted from the impact of a massive asteroid 10 to 15 km (6 to 9 mi) wide, creating the Chicxulub impact crater and devastating the global environment primarily through a lingering impact winter which halted photosynthesis in plants and plankton. The impact hypothesis, also known as the Alvarez hypothesis, was bolstered by the discovery of the 180 km (112 mi) Chicxulub crater in the Gulf of Mexico's Yucatán Peninsula in the early 1990s. The timing of the ejecta layer, together with the match between fossil‑record ecological patterns and modeled environmental disruptions (such as darkness and cooling), supports the conclusion that the Chicxulub impact triggered the mass extinction.

A 2016 drilling project into the Chicxulub peak ring confirmed that it contained granite ejected within minutes from deep in the Earth, and that it contained hardly any gypsum, the usual sulfate-containing sea floor rock in the region. The gypsum would have vaporized and dispersed as an aerosol into the atmosphere, causing longer-term effects on the climate and food chain. In October 2019, researchers proposed a mechanism of the mass extinction, arguing that the Chicxulub asteroid impact event rapidly acidified the oceans and produced long-lasting effects on the climate.

Other proposed causal or contributing factors to the extinction have included the Deccan Traps and other volcanic eruptions, climate change, and sea level change. However, scientists in 2020 concluded that climate-modeling of the mass extinction event favored the asteroid impact and not volcanism.

A wide range of terrestrial species perished in the K–Pg mass extinction, the best-known being the non-avian dinosaurs, along with many mammals, birds, lizards, insects, plants, and all of the pterosaurs. The K–Pg mass extinction also killed off plesiosaurs and mosasaurs and devastated teleost fish, sharks, molluscs (especially ammonites and rudists, which became extinct), and many species of plankton in the oceans. However, the extinction also provided evolutionary opportunities. In its wake, many groups underwent remarkable adaptive radiation—sudden and prolific divergence into new forms and species within the disrupted and emptied ecological niches. Mammals in particular diversified in the following Paleogene Period, evolving new forms such as horses, whales, bats, and primates. The surviving group of dinosaurs were avians, a few species of ground and water fowl, which radiated into all modern species of birds. Among the other groups, teleost fish and perhaps lizards also radiated into their modern species.

== Extinction patterns ==

The blue graph shows the apparent percentage (not the absolute number) of marine animal genera becoming extinct during any given time interval. It does not represent all marine species, just those that are readily fossilized. The labels of the traditional "Big Five" extinction events and the more recently recognised Capitanian mass extinction event are clickable links; see Extinction event for more details. (source and image info)

The K–Pg extinction event was global, rapid, and selective, eliminating a vast number of species. Based on marine fossils, it is estimated that 75% or more of all species became extinct.

The event appears to have affected all of the continents at the same time. Non-avian dinosaurs, for example, are seen in the Maastrichtian of North America, Europe, Asia, Africa, South America, and Antarctica, but are not found from the Cenozoic era anywhere in the world. Similarly, fossil pollen shows devastation of the plant communities in areas as far apart as New Mexico, Alaska, China, and New Zealand. Nevertheless, high latitudes appear to have been less strongly affected than low latitudes.

Despite the event's severity, there was significant variability in the rate of extinction between and within different clades. Species that depended on photosynthesis declined or became extinct as atmospheric particles blocked sunlight and reduced the solar energy reaching the ground. This plant extinction caused a major reshuffling of the dominant plant groups. Omnivores, insectivores, and carrion-eaters survived the extinction event, perhaps because of the increased availability of their food sources. Neither strictly herbivorous nor strictly carnivorous mammals seem to have survived. Rather, the surviving mammals and birds fed on insects, worms, and snails, which in turn fed on detritus (dead plant and animal matter).

In stream and lake ecosystems, few animal groups became extinct, including large forms like crocodyliforms and champsosaurs, because such ecosystems rely less directly on food from living plants, and more on detritus washed in from the land, protecting them from this extinction. Modern crocodilians can live as scavengers and survive for months without food, and their young are small, grow slowly, and feed largely on invertebrates and dead organisms for their first few years. These characteristics have been linked to crocodilian survival at the end of the Cretaceous period.

Similar, but more complex, patterns have been found in the oceans. Extinction was more severe among animals living in the water column than among animals living on or in the sea floor. Animals in the water column are almost entirely dependent on primary production from living phytoplankton, while animals on the ocean floor always or sometimes feed on detritus. The impact's blockage of sunlight devastated marine food webs which relied on photosynthetic plankton, and “the oceans may have very well returned to a single-celled state that the world had not seen in over half a billion years.” Consequently, coccolithophores—vital to the open ocean ecosystem during the late Cretaceous—were nearly eradicated; however, researchers have theorized that surviving mixotrophic coccolithophores, capable of movement and ingestion of prey particles in addition to photosynthesis, were critical to restoring the algal food web over time. Coccolithophorids and mollusks (including ammonites, rudists, freshwater snails, and mussels), and those organisms whose food chain included these shell builders, became extinct or suffered heavy losses. For example, it is thought that ammonites were the principal prey of mosasaurs, a group of giant marine reptiles that became extinct during the K–Pg event.

The K–Pg extinction had a profound effect on the evolution of life on Earth. The elimination of dominant Cretaceous groups allowed other organisms to take their place, causing a remarkable amount of species diversification during the Paleogene Period. After the K–Pg extinction event, biodiversity required substantial time to recover, despite the existence of abundant vacant ecological niches. Evidence from the Salamanca Formation suggests that biotic recovery was more rapid in the Southern Hemisphere than in the Northern Hemisphere.

Despite the massive loss of life inferred to have occurred during the extinction, and a number of geologic formations worldwide that span the boundary, only a few fossil sites contain direct evidence of the mass mortality that occurred exactly at the K–Pg boundary. These include the Tanis site of the Hell Creek Formation in North Dakota, United States, which contains a high number of well-preserved fossils that appear to have been buried in a catastrophic flood event likely caused by the impact. Another important site is the Hornerstown Formation in New Jersey, United States, which has a prominent layer at the K–Pg boundary known as the Main Fossiliferous Layer (MFL). It contains a mass accumulation of disarticulated vertebrate remains, likely deposited by a catastrophic impact‑related flood.

=== Microbiota ===
The K–Pg boundary represents one of the most dramatic turnovers in the fossil record for nannoplankton that formed the calcium deposits for which the Cretaceous is named. The turnover in this group is clearly marked at the species level. Statistical analysis of marine losses at this time suggests that the decrease in diversity was caused more by a sharp increase in extinctions than by a decrease in speciation. Major spatial differences existed in calcareous nannoplankton diversity patterns; in the Southern Hemisphere, the extinction was less severe and recovery occurred much faster than in the Northern Hemisphere. Following the extinction, survivor communities dominated for several hundred thousand years. The North Pacific acted as a diversity hotspot from which later nannoplankton communities radiated as they replaced survivor faunas across the globe.

The K–Pg boundary record of dinoflagellates is not so well understood, mainly because only microbial cysts provide a fossil record, and not all dinoflagellate species have cyst-forming stages, which likely causes diversity to be underestimated. Recent studies indicate that there were no major shifts in dinoflagellates through the boundary layer. There were blooms of the taxa Thoracosphaera operculata and Braarudosphaera bigelowii at the boundary.

Radiolaria have left a geological record since at least the Ordovician times, and their mineral fossil skeletons can be tracked across the K–Pg boundary. There is no evidence of mass extinction of these organisms, and there is support for high productivity of these species in southern high latitudes as a result of cooling temperatures in the early Paleocene. Approximately 46% of diatom species survived the transition from the Cretaceous to the Upper Paleocene, a significant turnover in species but not a catastrophic extinction.

The occurrence of planktonic foraminifera across the K–Pg boundary has been studied since the 1930s. Research spurred by the possibility of an impact event at the K–Pg boundary resulted in numerous publications detailing planktonic foraminiferal extinction at the boundary; there is ongoing debate between groups which think the evidence indicates substantial extinction of these species at the K–Pg boundary, and those who think the evidence supports a gradual extinction through the boundary. There is strong evidence that local conditions heavily influenced diversity changes in planktonic foraminifera. Low and mid-latitude communities of planktonic foraminifera experienced high extinction rates, while high latitude faunas were relatively unaffected.

Numerous species of benthic foraminifera became extinct during the event, presumably because they depend on organic debris for nutrients, while biomass in the ocean is thought to have decreased. As the marine microbiota recovered, it is thought that increased speciation of benthic foraminifera resulted from the increase in food sources. In some areas, such as Texas, benthic foraminifera show no sign of any major extinction event, however. Phytoplankton recovery in the early Paleocene provided the food source to support large benthic foraminiferal assemblages, which are mainly detritus-feeding. Ultimate recovery of the benthic populations occurred over several stages lasting several hundred thousand years into the early Paleocene.

=== Marine invertebrates ===
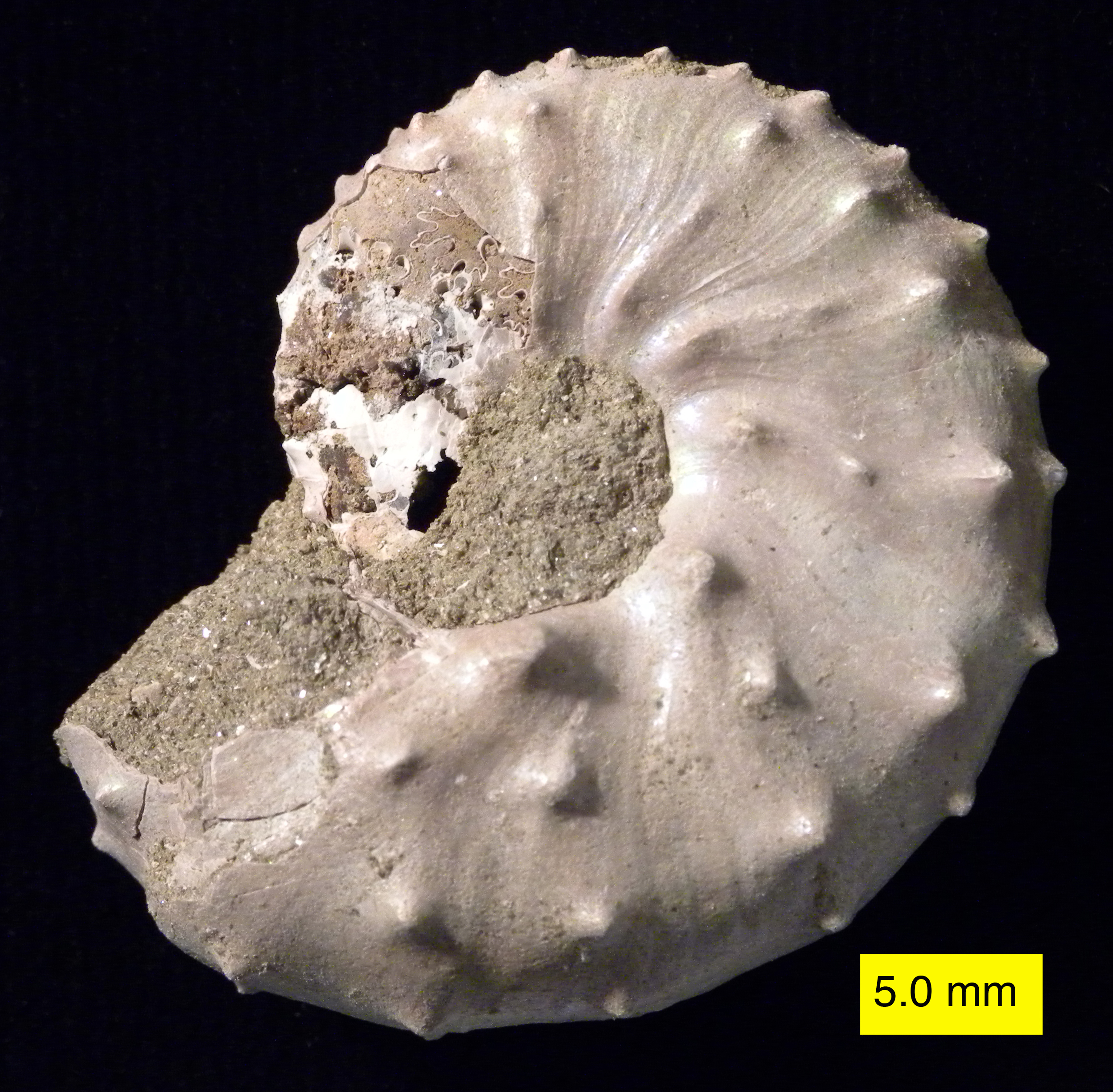
Discoscaphites iris, an ammonite from the Owl Creek Formation (Upper Cretaceous), in Owl Creek near Ripley, Mississippi

There is significant variation in the fossil record as to the extinction rate of marine invertebrates across the K–Pg boundary. The apparent rate is influenced by a lack of fossil records, rather than by extinctions.

Ostracods, a class of small crustaceans that were prevalent in the upper Maastrichtian, left fossil deposits in a variety of locations. A review of these fossils shows that ostracod diversity was lower in the Paleocene than any other time in the Cenozoic. Current research cannot ascertain whether the extinctions occurred prior to, or during, the boundary interval. Ostracods that were heavily sexually selected were more vulnerable to extinction, and ostracod sexual dimorphism was significantly rarer following the mass extinction.

Among decapods, extinction patterns were highly heterogeneous and cannot be neatly attributed to any particular factor. Decapods that inhabited the Western Interior Seaway were especially hard-hit, while other regions of the world's oceans were refugia that increased chances of survival into the Palaeocene. Among retroplumid crabs, the genus Costacopluma was a notable survivor.

Around 60% of late-Cretaceous scleractinian coral genera failed to cross the K–Pg boundary into the Paleocene. Further analysis of the coral extinctions shows that approximately 98% of colonial species, ones that inhabit warm, shallow tropical waters, became extinct. The solitary corals, which generally do not form reefs and inhabit colder and deeper (below the photic zone) areas of the ocean were less impacted by the K–Pg boundary. Colonial coral species rely upon symbiosis with photosynthetic algae, which collapsed due to the events surrounding the K–Pg boundary, but the use of data from coral fossils to support K–Pg extinction and subsequent Paleocene recovery, must be weighed against the changes that occurred in coral ecosystems through the K–Pg boundary.

Most species of brachiopods, a small phylum of marine invertebrates, survived the K–Pg extinction event and diversified during the early Paleocene.

The numbers of bivalve genera exhibited significant diminution after the K–Pg boundary. Entire groups of bivalves, including rudists (reef-building clams) and inoceramids (giant relatives of modern scallops), became extinct at the K–Pg boundary, with the gradual extinction of most inoceramid bivalves beginning well before the K–Pg boundary. Deposit feeders were the most common bivalves in the catastrophe's aftermath. Abundance was not a factor that affected whether a bivalve taxon went extinct, according to evidence from North America. Veneroid bivalves developed deeper burrowing habitats as the recovery from the crisis ensued.

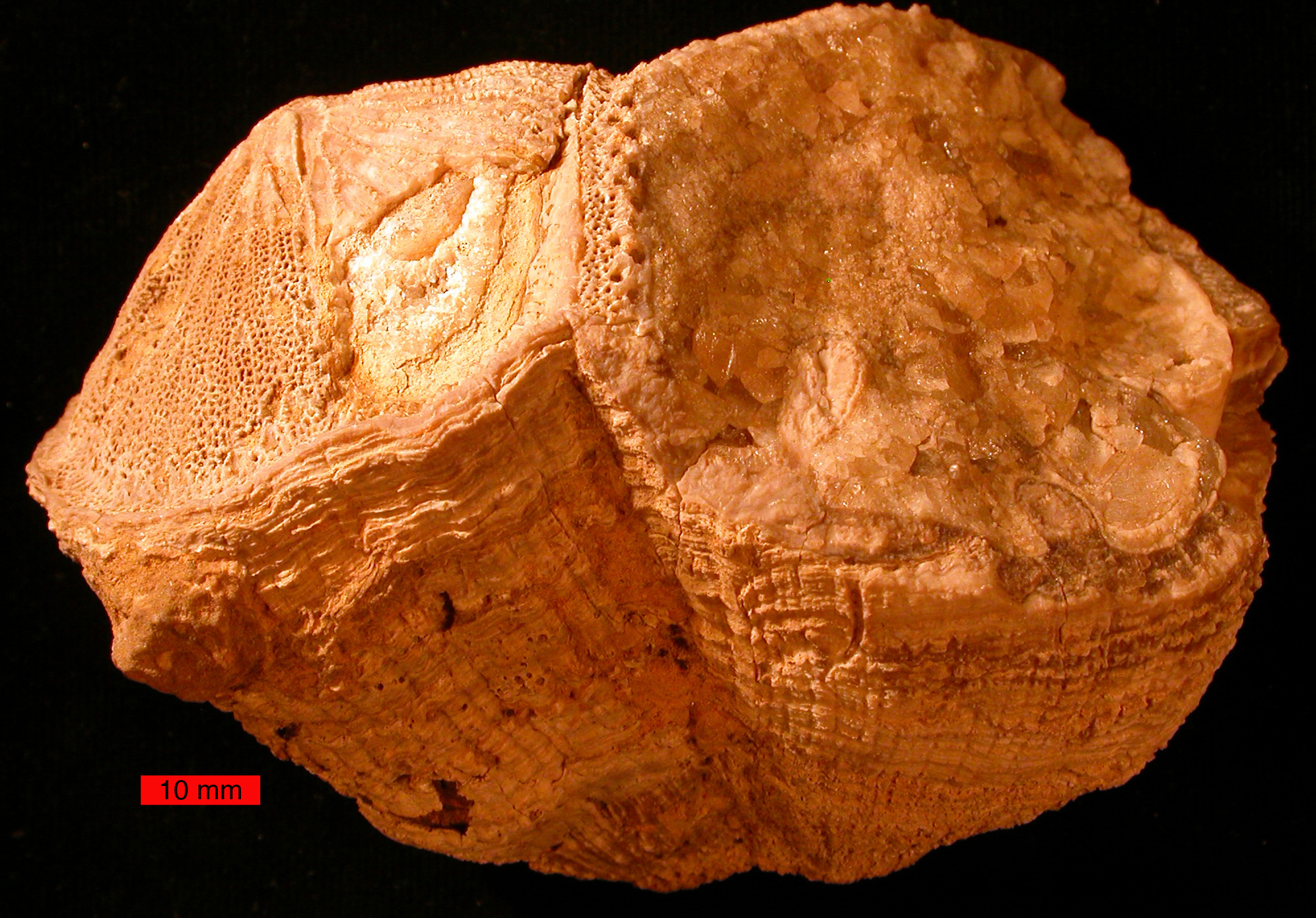
Rudist bivalves from the Late Cretaceous of the Omani Mountains, United Arab Emirates. Scale bar is 10 mm.

Except for nautiloids (represented by the modern order Nautilida) and coleoids (which had already diverged into modern octopodes, squids, and cuttlefish) all other species of the molluscan class Cephalopoda became extinct at the K–Pg boundary. These included the ecologically significant belemnoids, as well as the ammonoids, a group of highly diverse, numerous, and widely distributed shelled cephalopods. The extinction of belemnites enabled surviving cephalopod clades to fill their niches. Ammonite genera became extinct at or near the K–Pg boundary; there was a smaller and slower extinction of ammonite genera prior to the boundary associated with a late Cretaceous marine regression, and a small, gradual reduction in ammonite diversity occurred throughout the very late Cretaceous. Researchers have pointed out that the reproductive strategy of the surviving nautiloids, which rely upon few and larger eggs, played a role in outsurviving their ammonoid counterparts through the extinction event. The ammonoids utilized a planktonic strategy of reproduction (numerous eggs and planktonic larvae), which would have been devastated by the K–Pg extinction event. Additional research has shown that subsequent to this elimination of ammonoids from the global biota, nautiloids began an evolutionary radiation into shell shapes and complexities theretofore known only from ammonoids.

Approximately 35% of echinoderm genera became extinct at the K–Pg boundary, although taxa that thrived in low-latitude, shallow-water environments during the late Cretaceous had the highest extinction rate. Mid-latitude, deep-water echinoderms were much less affected at the K–Pg boundary. The pattern of extinction points to habitat loss, specifically the drowning of carbonate platforms, the shallow-water reefs in existence at that time, by the extinction event. Atelostomatans were affected by the Lilliput effect.

=== Terrestrial invertebrates ===
Insect damage to the fossilized leaves of flowering plants from fourteen sites in North America was used as a proxy for insect diversity across the K–Pg boundary and analyzed to determine the rate of extinction. Researchers found that Cretaceous sites, prior to the extinction event, had rich plant and insect-feeding diversity. During the early Paleocene, flora were relatively diverse with little predation from insects, even 1.7 million years after the extinction event. Studies of the size of the ichnotaxon Naktodemasis bowni, produced by either cicada nymphs or beetle larvae, over the course of the K–Pg transition show that the Lilliput effect occurred in terrestrial invertebrates thanks to the extinction event.

The extinction event produced major changes in Paleogene insect communities. Many groups of ants were present in the Cretaceous, but in the Eocene ants became dominant and diverse, with larger colonies. Butterflies diversified as well, perhaps to take the place of leaf-eating insects wiped out by the extinction. The advanced mound-building termites, Termitidae, also appear to have risen in importance.

=== Fish ===
There are fossil records of jawed fishes across the K–Pg boundary, which provide good evidence of extinction patterns of these classes of marine vertebrates. While the deep-sea realm was able to remain seemingly unaffected, there was an equal loss between the open marine apex predators and the durophagous feeders on the continental shelf. Within cartilaginous fish, approximately 7 out of the 41 families of neoselachians (modern sharks, skates, and rays) disappeared after this event and batoids (skates and rays) lost nearly all the identifiable species, while more than 90% of teleost fish (bony fish) families survived.

In the Maastrichtian age, 28 shark families and 13 batoid families thrived, of which 25 and 9, respectively, survived the K–Pg boundary event. Forty-seven of all neoselachian genera cross the K–Pg boundary, with 85% being sharks. Batoids display with 15%, a comparably low survival rate. Among elasmobranchs, those species that inhabited higher latitudes and lived pelagic lifestyles were more likely to survive, whereas epibenthic lifestyles and durophagy were strongly associated with the likelihood of perishing during the extinction event.

There is evidence of a mass extinction of bony fishes at a fossil site immediately above the K–Pg boundary layer on Seymour Island near Antarctica, apparently precipitated by the K–Pg extinction event; the marine and freshwater environments of fishes mitigated the environmental effects of the extinction event. The result was Patterson's Gap, a period in the earliest part of the Cenozoic of decreased acanthomorph diversity, although acanthomorphs diversified rapidly after the extinction. Teleost fish diversified explosively after the mass extinction, filling the niches left vacant by the extinction. Groups appearing in the Paleocene and Eocene epochs include billfish, tunas, eels, and flatfish.

=== Amphibians ===
There is limited evidence for extinction of amphibians at the K–Pg boundary. A study of fossil vertebrates across the K–Pg boundary in Montana concluded that no species of amphibian became extinct. Yet there are several species of Maastrichtian amphibian, not included as part of this study, which are unknown from the Paleocene. These include the frog Theatonius lancensis and the albanerpetontid Albanerpeton galaktion; therefore, some amphibians do seem to have become extinct at the boundary. The relatively low levels of extinction seen among amphibians probably reflect the low extinction rates seen in freshwater animals. Following the mass extinction, frogs radiated substantially, with 88% of modern anuran diversity being traced back to three lineages of frogs that evolved after the cataclysm.

=== Reptiles ===
==== Choristoderes ====
The choristoderes (a group of semi-aquatic diapsids of uncertain position) survived across the K–Pg boundary subsequently becoming extinct in the Miocene. The gharial-like choristodere genus Champsosaurus' palatal teeth suggest that there were dietary changes among the various species across the K–Pg event.

==== Turtles ====
More than 80% of Cretaceous turtle species passed through the K–Pg boundary. All six turtle families in existence at the end of the Cretaceous survived into the Paleogene and are represented by living species. Analysis of turtle survivorship in the Hell Creek Formation shows a minimum of 75% of turtle species survived. Following the extinction event, turtle diversity exceeded pre-extinction levels in the Danian of North America, although in South America it remained diminished. European turtles likewise recovered rapidly following the mass extinction.

==== Lepidosauria ====
The rhynchocephalians, which were a globally distributed and diverse group of lepidosaurians during the early Mesozoic, had begun to decline by the mid-Cretaceous, although they remained successful in the Late Cretaceous of southern South America. They are represented today by a single species, the tuatara (Sphenodon punctatus) found in New Zealand. Outside of New Zealand, one rhynchocephalian is known to have crossed the K–Pg boundary, Kawasphenodon peligrensis, known from the earliest Paleocene (Danian) of Patagonia.

The order Squamata, comprising lizards and snakes, first diversified during the Jurassic and continued to diversify throughout the Cretaceous. They are currently the most successful and diverse group of living reptiles, with more than 10,000 extant species. The only major group of terrestrial lizards to go extinct at the end of the Cretaceous were the polyglyphanodontians, a diverse group of mainly herbivorous lizards known predominantly from the Northern Hemisphere. The mosasaurs, a diverse group of large predatory marine reptiles, also became extinct. Fossil evidence indicates that squamates generally suffered very heavy losses in the K–Pg event, only recovering 10 million years after it. The extinction of Cretaceous lizards and snakes may have led to the evolution of modern groups such as iguanas, monitor lizards, and boas. The diversification of crown group snakes has been linked to the biotic recovery in the aftermath of the K–Pg extinction event. Pan-Gekkotans weathered the extinction event well, with multiple lineages likely surviving.

==== Marine reptiles ====
∆^{44/42}Ca values indicate that prior to the mass extinction, marine reptiles at the top of food webs were feeding on only one source of calcium, suggesting their populations exhibited heightened vulnerability to extinctions at the terminus of the Cretaceous. Along with the aforementioned mosasaurs, plesiosaurs, represented by the families Elasmosauridae and Polycotylidae, became extinct during the event. The ichthyosaurs had disappeared from fossil record tens of millions of years prior to the K–Pg extinction event.

==== Crocodyliforms ====
Ten families of crocodilians or their close relatives are represented in the Maastrichtian fossil records, of which five died out prior to the K–Pg boundary. Five families have both Maastrichtian and Paleocene fossil representatives. All of the surviving families of crocodyliforms inhabited freshwater and terrestrial environments—except for the Dyrosauridae, which lived in freshwater and marine locations. Approximately 50% of crocodyliform representatives survived across the K–Pg boundary, the only apparent trend being that no large crocodiles survived. Crocodyliform survivability across the boundary may have resulted from their aquatic niche and ability to burrow, which reduced susceptibility to negative environmental effects at the boundary. Jouve and colleagues suggested in 2008 that juvenile marine crocodyliforms lived in freshwater environments as do modern marine crocodile juveniles, which would have helped them survive where other marine reptiles became extinct; freshwater environments were not so strongly affected by the K–Pg extinction event as marine environments were. Among the terrestrial clade Notosuchia, only the family Sebecidae survived; the exact reasons for this pattern are not known. Sebecids were large terrestrial predators, are known from the Eocene of Europe, and would survive in South America into the Miocene. Tethysuchians radiated explosively after the extinction event.

==== Pterosaurs ====
Two families of pterosaurs, Azhdarchidae and Nyctosauridae, were definitely present in the Maastrichtian, and they likely became extinct at the K–Pg boundary. Several other pterosaur lineages may have been present during the Maastrichtian, such as the ornithocheirids, pteranodontids, a possible tapejarid, a possible thalassodromid and a basal toothed taxon of uncertain affinities, though they are represented by fragmentary remains that are difficult to assign to any given group. While this was occurring, modern birds were undergoing diversification; traditionally it was thought that they replaced archaic birds and pterosaur groups, possibly due to direct competition, or they simply filled empty niches, but there is no correlation between pterosaur and avian diversities that are conclusive to a competition hypothesis, and small pterosaurs were present in the Late Cretaceous. At least some niches previously held by birds were reclaimed by pterosaurs prior to the K–Pg event.

==== Non-avian dinosaurs ====
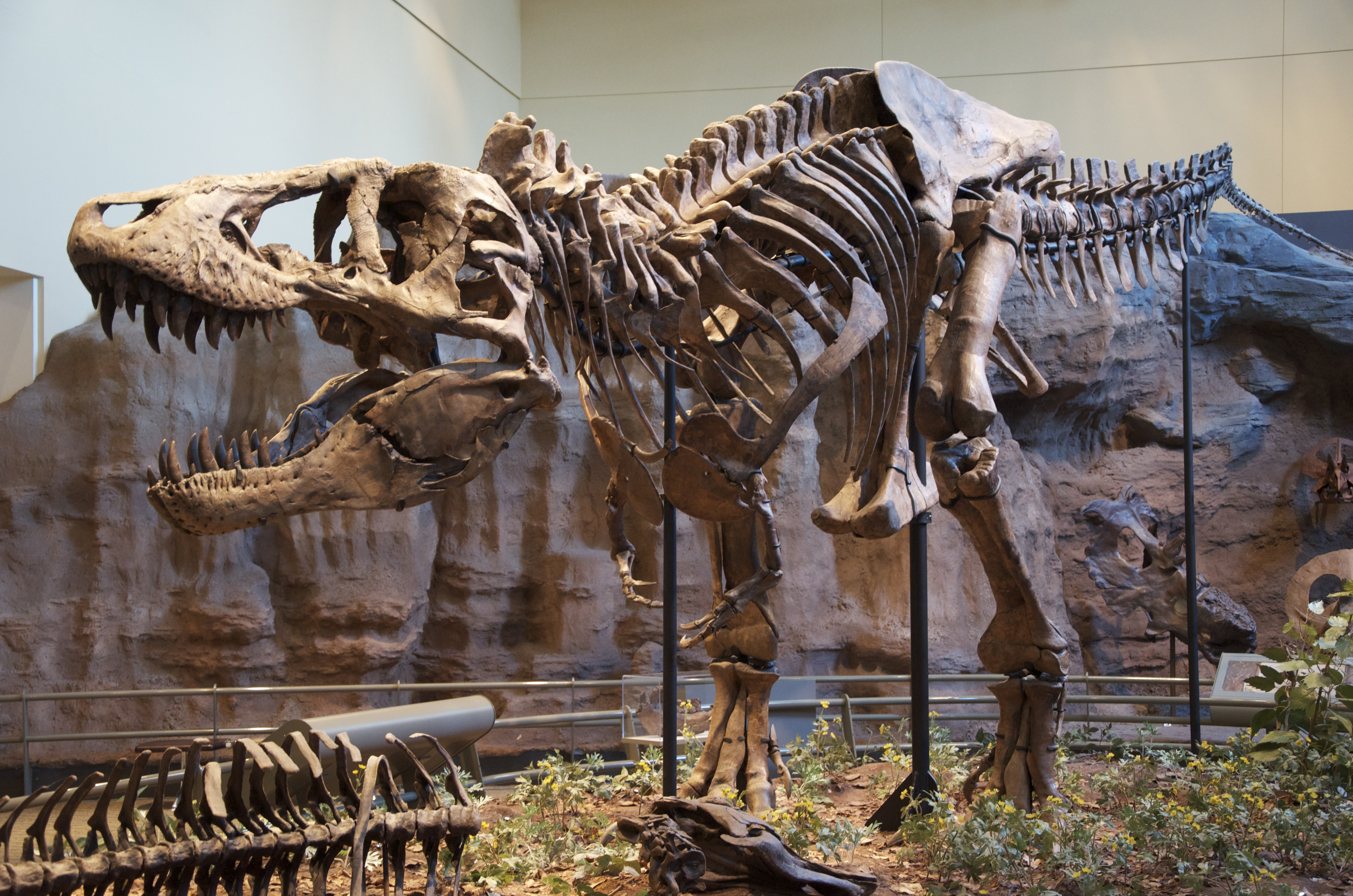
Tyrannosaurus was among the dinosaurs living on Earth before the extinction

Scientists agree that all non-avian dinosaurs became extinct at the K–Pg boundary. There is no evidence that late Maastrichtian non-avian dinosaurs could burrow, swim, or dive, which suggests they were unable to shelter themselves from the worst parts of any environmental stress that occurred at the K–Pg boundary. It is possible that small dinosaurs (other than birds) did survive, but they would have been deprived of food, as herbivorous dinosaurs would have found plant material scarce and carnivores would have quickly found prey in short supply.

The growing consensus about the endothermy of dinosaurs (see dinosaur physiology) helps to understand their full extinction in contrast with their close relatives, the crocodilians. Ectothermic ("cold-blooded") crocodiles have very limited needs for food (they can survive several months without eating), while endothermic ("warm-blooded") animals of similar size need much more food to sustain their faster metabolism. Thus, under the circumstances of food chain disruption previously mentioned, non-avian dinosaurs died out, while some crocodilians survived. In this context, the survival of other endothermic animals, such as some birds and mammals, could be due, among other reasons, to their smaller needs for food, related to their small size at the extinction epoch. Prolonged cold is unlikely to have been a reason for the extinction of non-avian dinosaurs given the adaptations of many dinosaurs to cold environments.

Whether the extinction occurred gradually or suddenly has been debated, with both views having support from the fossil record. Interpretations of the dinosaur fossil record have pointed to both a decline in diversity and no decline in diversity during the last few million years of the Cretaceous. It may be that the quality of the dinosaur fossil record is simply not good enough to permit researchers to distinguish between the options. A highly informative sequence of dinosaur-bearing rocks from the K–Pg boundary is found in western North America, particularly the late Maastrichtian-age Hell Creek Formation of Montana. Comparison with the older Judith River Formation (Montana) and Dinosaur Park Formation (Alberta), which both date from approximately 75 Ma, provides information on the changes in dinosaur populations over the last 10 million years of the Cretaceous. These fossil beds are geographically limited, covering only part of one continent. The middle–late Campanian formations show a greater diversity of dinosaurs than any other single group of rocks. The late Maastrichtian rocks contain the largest members of several major clades: Tyrannosaurus, Ankylosaurus, Pachycephalosaurus, Triceratops, and Torosaurus, which suggests food was plentiful immediately prior to the extinction. A study of 29 fossil sites in Catalan Pyrenees of Europe in 2010 supports the view that dinosaurs there had great diversity until the asteroid impact, with more than 100 living species. More recent research indicates that this figure is obscured by taphonomic biases and the sparsity of the continental fossil record. The results of this study, which were based on estimated real global biodiversity, showed that between 628 and 1,078 non-avian dinosaur species were alive at the end of the Cretaceous and underwent sudden extinction after the Cretaceous–Paleogene extinction event. Alternatively, interpretation based on the fossil-bearing rocks along the Red Deer River in Alberta, Canada, supports the gradual extinction of non-avian dinosaurs; during the last 10 million years of the Cretaceous layers there, the number of dinosaur species seems to have decreased from about 45 to approximately 12. Other scientists have made the same assessment following their research.

Several researchers support the existence of Paleocene non-avian dinosaurs. Evidence of this existence is based on the discovery of dinosaur remains in the Hell Creek Formation up to 1.3 m (4.3 ft) above and 40,000 years later than the K–Pg boundary. Pollen samples recovered near a fossilized hadrosaur femur recovered in the Ojo Alamo Sandstone at the San Juan River in Colorado, indicate the hadrosaur lived during the Cenozoic, approximately 64.5 Ma (about 1 million years after the K–Pg extinction event). If their existence past the K–Pg boundary can be confirmed, these hadrosaurids would be considered a dead clade walking. The scientific consensus is that these fossils were eroded from their original locations and then re-buried in much later sediments (also known as reworked fossils).

==== Birds ====
Most paleontologists regard birds as the only surviving dinosaurs (see Origin of birds). It is thought that all non-avian theropods became extinct, including then-flourishing groups such as enantiornithines and hesperornithiforms. Several analyses of bird fossils show divergence of species prior to the K–Pg boundary, and that duck, chicken, and ratite bird relatives coexisted with non-avian dinosaurs. Large collections of bird fossils representing a range of different species provide definitive evidence for the persistence of archaic birds to within 300,000 years of the K–Pg boundary. The absence of these birds in the Paleogene is evidence that a mass extinction of archaic birds took place there, although Qinornis from China has been suggested to be a more basal member of Ornithurae which survived into the Paleocene.

Only a small fraction of ground and water-dwelling Cretaceous bird species survived the impact, giving rise to today's birds. The only bird group known for certain to have survived the K–Pg boundary is the Aves. Avians may have been able to survive the extinction as a result of their abilities to dive, swim, or seek shelter in water and marshlands. Many species of avians can build burrows, or nest in tree holes, or termite nests, all of which provided shelter from the environmental effects at the K–Pg boundary. Long-term survival past the boundary was assured as a result of filling ecological niches left empty by extinction of non-avian dinosaurs. Based on molecular sequencing and fossil dating, many species of birds (the Neoaves group in particular) appeared to radiate after the K–Pg boundary. The open niche space and relative scarcity of predators following the K–Pg extinction allowed for adaptive radiation of various avian groups. Ratites, for example, rapidly diversified in the early Paleogene and are believed to have convergently developed flightlessness at least three to six times, often fulfilling the niche space for large herbivores once occupied by non-avian dinosaurs.

=== Mammals ===
Mammalian species began diversifying approximately 30 million years prior to the K–Pg boundary. Diversification of mammals stalled across the boundary. All major Late Cretaceous mammalian lineages, including monotremes (egg-laying mammals), multituberculates, metatherians (which includes modern marsupials), eutherians (which includes modern placentals), meridiolestidans, and gondwanatheres survived the K–Pg extinction event, although they suffered losses. In particular, metatherians largely disappeared from North America, and the Asian deltatheroidans became extinct (aside from the lineage leading to Gurbanodelta) In the Hell Creek beds of North America, according to one study, at least half of the ten known multituberculate species and all eleven metatherians species are not found above the boundary. Multituberculates in Europe and North America survived relatively unscathed and quickly bounced back in the Paleocene, but Asian forms were devastated, never again to represent a significant component of mammalian fauna. A recent study indicates that metatherians suffered the heaviest losses at the K–Pg event, followed by multituberculates, while eutherians recovered the quickest. The mammals that survived the extinction were generally small, comparable in size to rats; this small size would have helped them find shelter in protected environments. It is postulated that some early monotremes, marsupials, and placentals were semiaquatic or burrowing, as there are multiple mammalian lineages with such habits today. Any burrowing or semiaquatic mammal would have had additional protection from K–Pg boundary environmental stresses.

After the K–Pg extinction, mammals evolved to fill the niches left vacant by the dinosaurs. Some research indicates that mammals did not explosively diversify across the K–Pg boundary, despite the ecological niches made available by the extinction of dinosaurs. Several mammalian orders have been interpreted as diversifying immediately after the K–Pg boundary, including Chiroptera (bats) and Cetartiodactyla (a diverse group that today includes whales and dolphins and even-toed ungulates), although recent research concludes that only marsupial orders diversified soon after the K–Pg boundary. However, morphological diversification rates among eutherians after the extinction event were thrice those of before it. Also significant, within the mammalian genera, new species were approximately 9.1% larger after the K–Pg boundary. After about 700,000 years, some mammals had reached 50 kilos (110 pounds), a 100-fold increase over the weight of those which survived the extinction. It is thought that body sizes of placental mammalian survivors evolutionarily increased first, allowing them to fill niches after the extinctions, with brain sizes increasing later in the Eocene.

=== Terrestrial plants ===
Plant fossils illustrate the reduction in plant species across the K–Pg boundary. There is overwhelming evidence of global disruption of plant communities at the K–Pg boundary. Extinctions are seen both in studies of fossil pollen, and fossil leaves. In North America, the data suggests massive devastation and mass extinction of plants at the K–Pg boundary sections, although there were substantial megafloral changes before the boundary. In North America, approximately 57% of plant species became extinct. In high southern hemisphere latitudes, such as New Zealand and Antarctica, the mass die-off of flora caused no significant turnover in species, but dramatic and short-term changes in the relative abundance of plant groups. European flora was also less affected, most likely due to its distance from the site of the Chicxulub impact. In northern Alaska and the Anadyr-Koryak region of Russia, the flora was minimally impacted. Another line of evidence of a major floral extinction is that the divergence rate of subviral pathogens (viroids) of angiosperms sharply decreased, which indicates an enormous reduction in the number of flowering plants. However, phylogenetic evidence shows no mass angiosperm extinction.

Due to the wholesale destruction of plants at the K–Pg boundary, there was a proliferation of saprotrophic organisms, such as fungi, that do not require photosynthesis and use nutrients from decaying vegetation. The dominance of fungal species lasted only a few years while the atmosphere cleared and plenty of organic matter to feed on was present. Once the atmosphere cleared photosynthetic organisms returned – initially ferns and other ground-level plants.

In some regions, the Paleocene recovery of plants began with recolonizations by fern species, represented as a fern spike in the geologic record; this same pattern of fern recolonization was observed after the 1980 Mount St. Helens eruption. Just two species of fern appear to have dominated the landscape for centuries after the event. In the sediments below the K–Pg boundary the dominant plant remains are angiosperm pollen grains, but the boundary layer contains little pollen and is dominated by fern spores. More usual pollen levels gradually resume above the boundary layer. This is reminiscent of areas blighted by modern volcanic eruptions, where the recovery is led by ferns, which are later replaced by larger angiosperm plants. In North American terrestrial sequences, the extinction event is best represented by the marked discrepancy between the rich and relatively abundant late-Maastrichtian pollen record and the post-boundary fern spike.

Polyploidy appears to have enhanced the ability of flowering plants to survive the extinction, probably because the additional copies of the genome such plants possessed allowed them to more readily adapt to the rapidly changing environmental conditions that followed the impact.

Beyond extinction impacts, the event also caused more general changes of flora such as giving rise to neotropical rainforest biomes like the Amazonia, replacing species composition and structure of local forests during ~6 million years of recovery to former levels of plant diversity.

=== Fungi ===
While it appears that many fungi were wiped out at the K–Pg boundary, there is some evidence that some fungal species thrived in the years after the extinction event. Microfossils from that period indicate a great increase in fungal spores, long before the resumption of plentiful fern spores in the recovery after the impact. Monoporisporites and hypha are almost exclusive microfossils for a short span during and after the iridium boundary. These saprophytes would not need sunlight, allowing them to survive during a period when the atmosphere was likely clogged with dust and sulfur aerosols.

The proliferation of fungi has occurred after several extinction events, including the Permian–Triassic extinction event, the largest known mass extinction in Earth's history, with up to 96% of all species suffering extinction.

== Seasonal dating ==
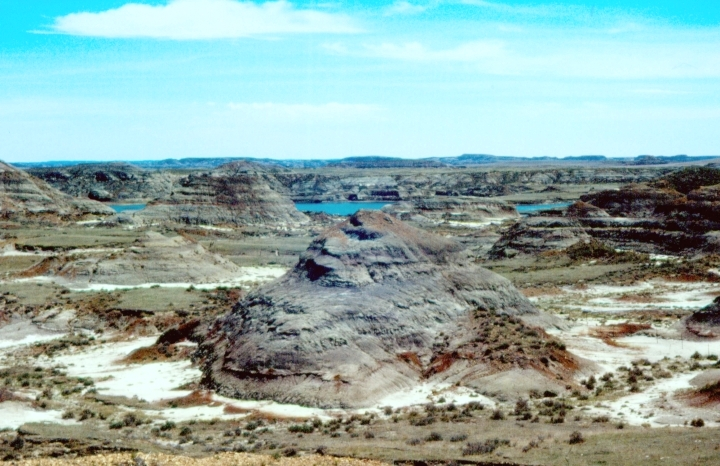
Hell Creek Formation

Detailed research has investigated the season of the Chicxulub impact. A 1991 study of fossil leaves dated the extinction-associated freezing to early June. A later study shifted the dating to spring season, based on the osteological evidence and stable isotope records of well-preserved bones of acipenseriform fishes. The study noted that "the palaeobotanical identities, taphonomic inferences and stratigraphic assumptions" for the June dating have since all been refuted. Depalma et al. (2021) opted for the spring–summer range, but During et al. (2024) reevaluated and criticized this study based on its lack of primary data, unidentified laboratory for the analyses, insufficient methods for accurate replication and problematic isotopic graphs with irregular data and error bars. A study of fossilized fish bones found at Tanis in North Dakota suggests that the Cretaceous-Paleogene mass extinction happened during the Northern Hemisphere spring.

== Duration ==
The extinction's rapidity is a controversial issue because some researchers think the extinction was the result of a sudden event, while others argue that it took place over a long period. The exact length of time is difficult to determine because of the Signor–Lipps effect, where the fossil record is so incomplete that most extinct species probably died out long after the most recent fossil that has been found. Scientists have also found very few continuous beds of fossil-bearing rock that cover a time range from several million years before the K–Pg extinction to several million years after it.

The sedimentation rate and thickness of K–Pg clay from three sites suggest rapid extinction, perhaps over a period of less than 10,000 years. At one site in the Denver Basin of Colorado, after the K–Pg boundary layer was deposited, the fern spike lasted approximately 1,000 years, and no more than 71,000 years; at the same location, the earliest appearance of Cenozoic mammals occurred after approximately 185,000 years, and no more than 570,000 years, "indicating rapid rates of biotic extinction and initial recovery in the Denver Basin during this event." Analysis of the carbon cycle disruptions caused by the impact constrains them to an interval of just 5,000 years. Models presented at the annual meeting of the American Geophysical Union estimated that the period of global darkness following the Chicxulub impact would have persisted in the Hell Creek Formation nearly 2 years.

== Causes ==
=== Chicxulub impact ===
==== Evidence for impact ====
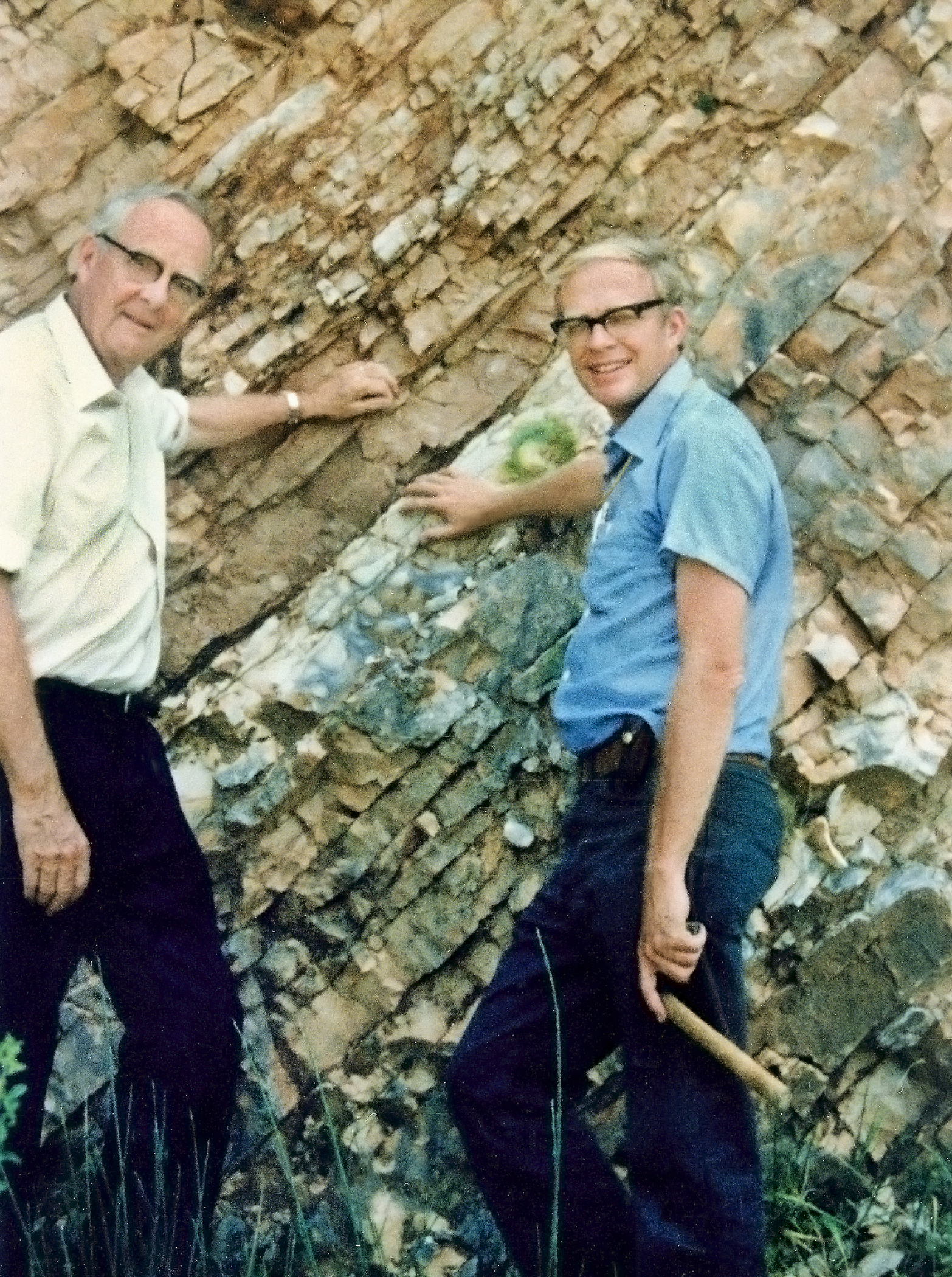
Luis, left, and his son Walter Alvarez, right, at the K-T boundary in Gubbio, Italy, 1981

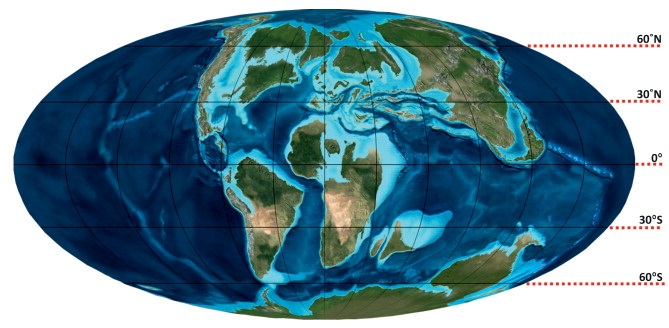
Late Cretaceous global map (Turonian)

In 1980, a team of researchers consisting of Nobel Prize-winning physicist Luis Alvarez, his son, geologist Walter Alvarez, and chemists Frank Asaro and Helen Michel discovered that sedimentary layers found all over the world at the Cretaceous–Paleogene boundary contain a concentration of iridium many times greater than normal (30, 160, and 20 times in three sections originally studied). Iridium is extremely rare in Earth's crust because it is a siderophile element which mostly sank along with iron into Earth's core during planetary differentiation. Instead, iridium is more common in comets and asteroids. Because of this, the Alvarez team suggested that an asteroid struck the Earth at the time of the K–Pg boundary.

There were earlier speculations on the possibility of an impact event, but this was the first hard evidence, and since then, studies have continued to demonstrate elevated iridium levels in association with the K–Pg boundary. This hypothesis was viewed as radical when first proposed, but additional evidence soon emerged. The boundary clay was found to be full of minute spherules of rock, crystallized from droplets of molten rock formed by the impact. Shocked quartz (Note: Shocked minerals have their internal structure deformed, and are created by intense pressures as in nuclear blasts and meteorite impacts.) and other minerals were also identified in the K–Pg boundary. The identification of giant tsunami beds along the Gulf Coast and the Caribbean provided more evidence, and suggested that the impact might have occurred nearby, as did the discovery that the K–Pg boundary became thicker in the southern United States, with meter-thick beds of debris occurring in northern New Mexico. A K–Pg boundary "cocktail" of microfossils, lithic fragments, and impact-derived material deposited by gigantic sediment gravity flows was discovered in the Caribbean that served to demarcate the impact.

Further research identified the giant Chicxulub crater, buried under Chicxulub on the coast of Yucatán, as the source of the K–Pg boundary clay. Identified in 1990 based on work by geophysicist Glen Penfield in 1978, the crater is oval, with an average diameter of roughly 180 km (110 mi), about the size calculated by the Alvarez team. In March 2010, an international panel of 41 scientists reviewed 20 years of scientific literature and endorsed the asteroid hypothesis, specifically the Chicxulub impact, as the cause of the extinction, ruling out other theories such as massive volcanism. They had determined that a 10-to-15-kilometer-wide (6 to 9 mi) asteroid hurtled into Earth at roughly (34,000 mph) into Chicxulub on Mexico's Yucatán Peninsula.

Additional evidence for the impact event is found at the Tanis site in southwestern North Dakota, United States. Tanis is part of the heavily studied Hell Creek Formation, a group of rocks spanning four states in North America renowned for many significant fossil discoveries from the Upper Cretaceous and lower Paleocene. Tanis is an extraordinary and unique site because it appears to record the events from the first minutes until a few hours after the impact of the giant Chicxulub asteroid in extreme detail. Amber from the site has been reported to contain microtektites matching those of the Chicxulub impact event. Some researchers question the interpretation of the findings at the site or are skeptical of the team leader, Robert DePalma, who had not yet received his Ph.D. in geology at the time of the discovery and whose commercial activities have been regarded with suspicion. Furthermore, indirect evidence of an asteroid impact as the cause of the mass extinction comes from patterns of turnover in marine plankton.

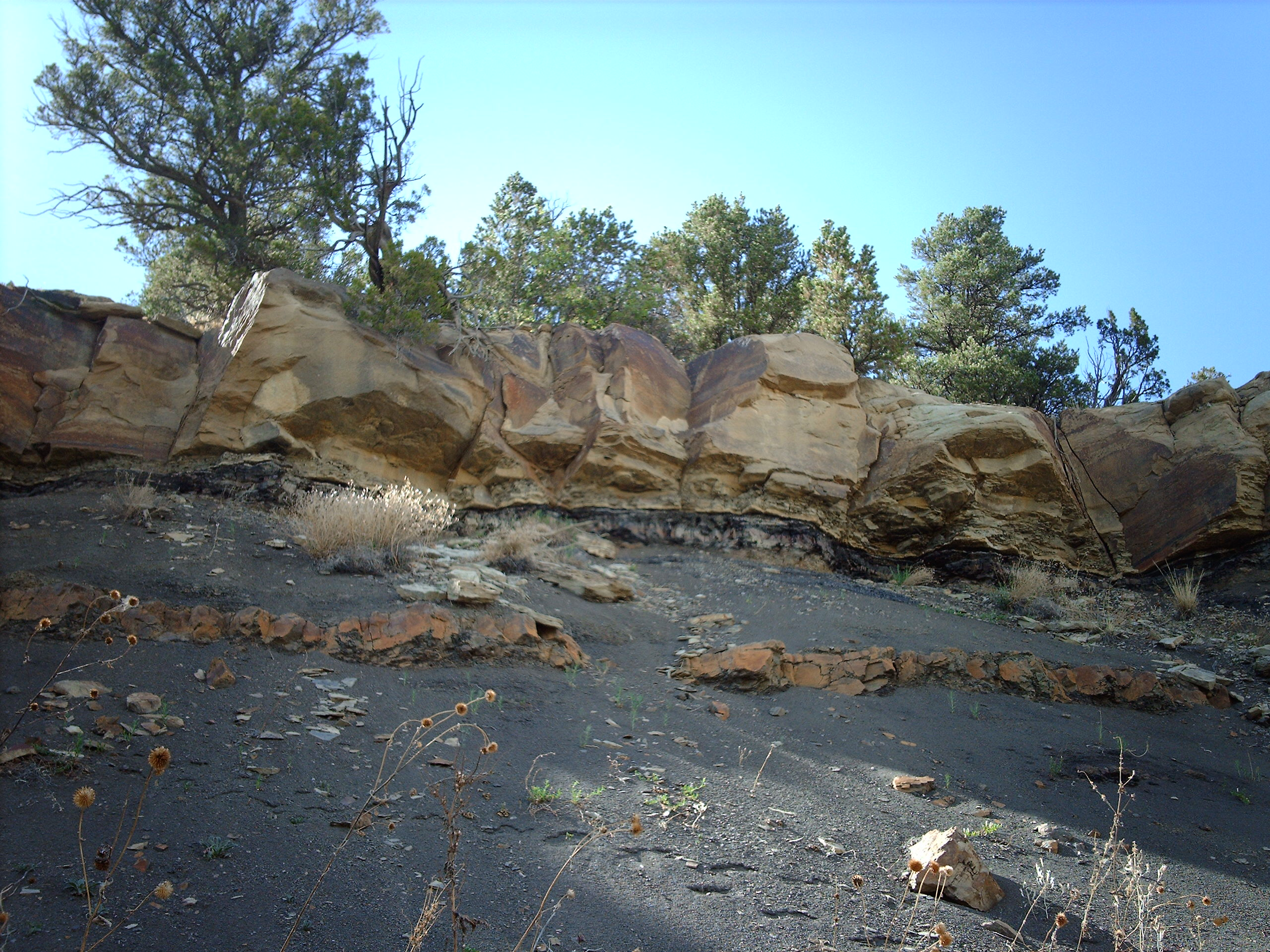
The K–Pg boundary exposure in Trinidad Lake State Park, in the Raton Basin of Colorado, shows an abrupt change from dark- to light-colored rock

Location of Chicxulub crater, Mexico

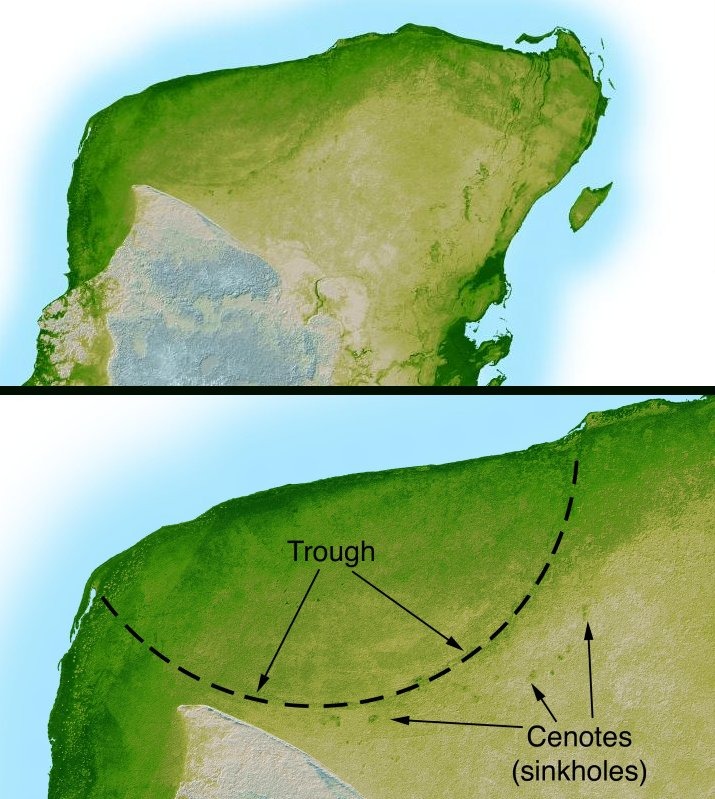
Radar topography reveals the 180 km (112 mi)-wide ring of the Chicxulub crater

In 2007, it was proposed that the impactor belonged to the Baptistina family of asteroids. This link has been doubted, though not disproved, in part because of a lack of observations of the asteroid and its family. It was reported in 2009 that 298 Baptistina does not share the chemical signature of the K–Pg impactor. Further, a 2011 Wide-field Infrared Survey Explorer (WISE) study of reflected light from the asteroids of the family estimated their break-up at 80 Ma, giving them insufficient time to shift orbits and impact Earth by 66 Ma.

==== Effects of impact ====
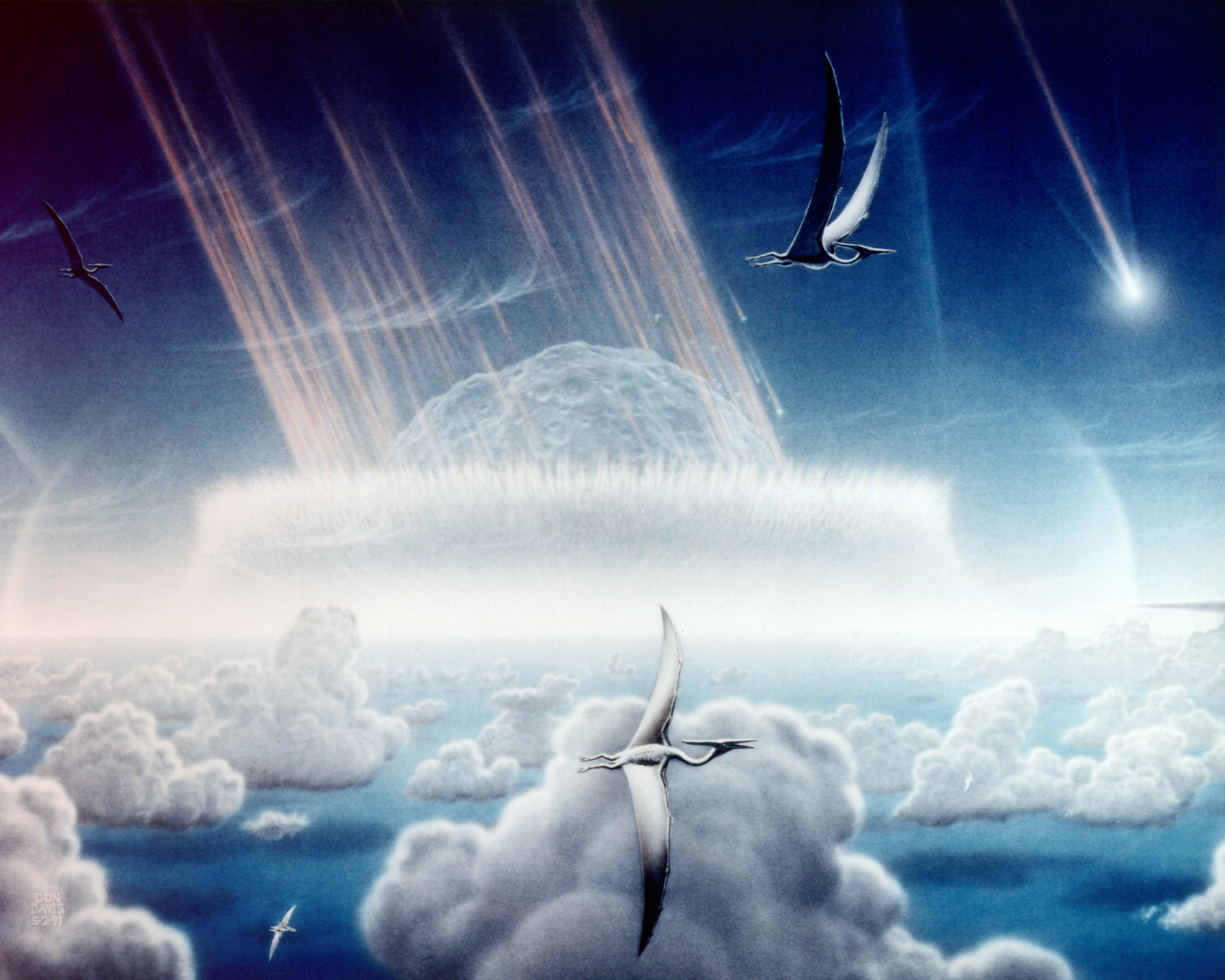
Artistic impression of the asteroid slamming into tropical, shallow seas of the sulfur-rich Yucatán Peninsula in what is today Southeast Mexico. The aftermath of this immense asteroid collision, which occurred approximately 66 million years ago, is believed to have caused the mass extinction of non-avian dinosaurs and many other species on Earth. The impact spewed hundreds of billions of tons of sulfur into the atmosphere, producing a worldwide blackout, and freezing temperatures which persisted for at least a decade.

The collision would have released the same energy as 100 teratonnes of TNT (4.2×10^{23} joules)—more than a billion times the energy of the atomic bombings of Hiroshima and Nagasaki. The Chicxulub impact caused a global catastrophe. Some of the phenomena were brief occurrences immediately following the impact, but there were also long-term geochemical and climatic disruptions that devastated the biosphere.

The scientific consensus is that the asteroid impact at the K–Pg boundary left megatsunami deposits and sediments around the area of the Caribbean Sea and Gulf of Mexico, from the colossal waves created by the impact. These deposits have been identified in the La Popa basin in northeastern Mexico, platform carbonates in northeastern Brazil, in Atlantic deep-sea sediments, and in the form of the thickest-known layer of graded sand deposits, around 100 m (330 ft), in the Chicxulub crater itself, directly above the shocked granite ejecta. The megatsunami has been estimated at more than 100 m (330 ft) tall, as the asteroid fell into relatively shallow seas; in deep seas it would have been 4.6 km (2.9 mi) tall. Fossiliferous sedimentary rocks deposited during the K–Pg impact have been found in the Gulf of Mexico area, including tsunami wash deposits carrying remains of a mangrove-type ecosystem, indicating that water in the Gulf of Mexico sloshed back and forth repeatedly after the impact; dead fish left in these shallow waters were not disturbed by scavengers.

The re-entry of ejecta into Earth's atmosphere included a brief (hours-long) but intense pulse of infrared radiation, cooking exposed organisms. This is debated, with opponents arguing that local ferocious fires, probably limited to North America, fall short of global firestorms. This is the "Cretaceous–Paleogene firestorm debate". A paper in 2013 by a prominent modeler of nuclear winter suggested that, based on the amount of soot in the global debris layer, the entire terrestrial biosphere might have burned, implying a global soot-cloud blocking out the sun and creating an impact winter effect. If widespread fires occurred this would have exterminated the most vulnerable organisms that survived the period immediately after the impact. Experimental analysis suggests that any impact-induced wildfires were insufficient on their own to cause plant extinctions, and much of the thermal radiation generated by the impact would have been absorbed by the atmosphere and ejecta in the lower atmosphere.

Aside from the hypothesized fire effects on reduction of insolation, the impact would have created a dust cloud that blocked sunlight for up to a year, inhibiting photosynthesis. The asteroid hit an area of gypsum and anhydrite rock containing a large amount of combustible hydrocarbons and sulfur, much of which was vaporized, thereby injecting sulfuric acid aerosols into the stratosphere, which might have reduced sunlight reaching the Earth's surface by more than 50%. Fine silicate dust also contributed to the intense impact winter, as did soot from wildfires. The climatic forcing of this impact winter was about 100 times more potent than that of the 1991 eruption of Mount Pinatubo. According to models of the Hell Creek Formation, the onset of global darkness would have reached its maximum in only a few weeks and likely lasted upwards of two years. Freezing temperatures probably lasted for at least three years. At Brazos section, the sea surface temperature dropped as much as 7 °C (13 °F) for decades after the impact. It would take at least ten years for such aerosols to dissipate, and would account for the extinction of plants and phytoplankton, and subsequently herbivores and their predators. Creatures whose food chains were based on detritus would have a reasonable chance of survival. In 2016, a scientific drilling project obtained deep rock-core samples from the peak ring around the Chicxulub impact crater. The discoveries confirmed that the rock comprising the peak ring had been shocked by immense pressure and melted in just minutes from its usual state into its present form. Unlike sea-floor deposits, the peak ring was made of granite originating much deeper in the earth, which had been ejected to the surface by the impact. Gypsum is a sulfate-containing rock usually present in the shallow seabed of the region; it had been almost entirely removed, vaporized into the atmosphere. The impactor was large enough to create a 190-kilometer-wide (120 mi) peak ring, to melt, shock, and eject deep granite, to create colossal water movements, and to eject an immense quantity of vaporized rock and sulfates into the atmosphere, where they would have persisted for several years. This worldwide dispersal of dust and sulfates would have affected climate catastrophically, led to large temperature drops, and devastated the food chain.

The release of large quantities of sulphur aerosols into the atmosphere as a consequence of the impact would also have caused acid rain. Oceans acidified as a result. This decrease in ocean pH would kill many organisms that grow shells of calcium carbonate. The heating of the atmosphere during the impact itself may have also generated nitric acid rain through the production of nitrogen oxides and their subsequent reaction with water vapour.

After the impact winter, the Earth entered a period of global warming as a result of the vaporisation of carbonates into carbon dioxide, whose long residence time in the atmosphere ensured significant warming would occur after more short-lived cooling gases dissipated. Carbon monoxide concentrations also increased and caused particularly devastating global warming because of the consequent increases in tropospheric ozone and methane concentrations. The impact's injection of water vapour into the atmosphere also produced major climatic perturbations.

The end-Cretaceous event is the only mass extinction definitively known to be associated with an impact, and other large extraterrestrial impacts, such as the Manicouagan Reservoir impact, do not coincide with any noticeable extinction events.

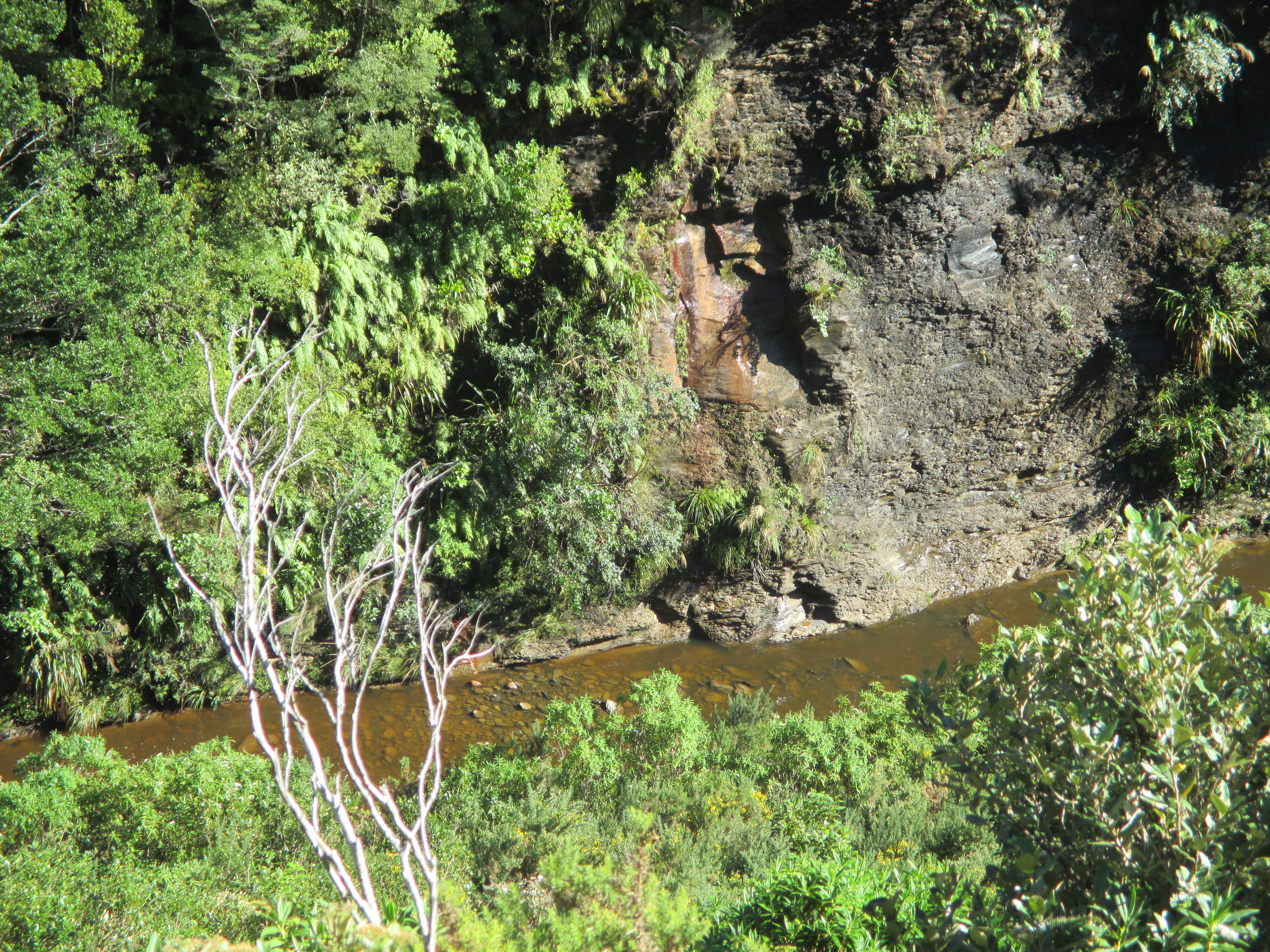
The river bed at the Moody Creek Mine, 7 Mile Creek / Waimatuku, Dunollie, New Zealand contains evidence of a devastating event on terrestrial plant communities at the Cretaceous–Paleogene boundary, confirming the severity and global nature of the event

=== Multiple impact event ===
Other crater-like topographic features have also been proposed as impact craters formed in connection with Cretaceous–Paleogene extinction. This suggests the possibility of near-simultaneous multiple impacts, perhaps from a fragmented asteroidal object similar to the Shoemaker–Levy 9 impact with Jupiter. In addition to the 180 km (110 mi) Chicxulub crater, there is the 24 km (15 mi) Boltysh crater in Ukraine (65.17±0.64 Ma), the 20 km (12 mi) Silverpit crater in the North Sea (59.5±14.5 Ma) possibly formed by bolide impact, and the controversial and much larger 600 km (370 mi) Shiva crater. Any other craters that might have formed in the Tethys Ocean would since have been obscured by the northward tectonic drift of Africa and India.

=== Deccan Traps ===
The Deccan Traps, which erupted close to the boundary between the Mesozoic and Cenozoic, have been cited as an alternate explanation for the mass extinction. A leading proponent of the Deccan Traps causation is Gerta Keller. Before 2000, arguments that the Deccan Traps flood basalts caused the extinction were usually linked to the view that the extinction was gradual, as the flood basalt events were thought to have started around 68 Mya and lasted more than 2 million years. The most recent evidence shows that the traps erupted over a period of only 800,000 years spanning the K–Pg boundary, and therefore may be responsible for the extinction and the delayed biotic recovery thereafter. Some geophysical models suggest that the Chicxulub impact 66.0 Mya could have triggered some of the largest Deccan eruptions, as well as eruptions at active volcano sites anywhere on Earth.

The Deccan Traps could have caused extinction through several mechanisms, including the release of dust and sulfuric aerosols into the air, which might have blocked sunlight and thereby reduced photosynthesis in plants. In addition, the latest Cretaceous saw a rise in global temperatures; Deccan Traps volcanism resulted in carbon dioxide emissions that increased the greenhouse effect when the dust and aerosols cleared from the atmosphere. Plant fossils record a 250 ppm increase in carbon dioxide concentrations across the K–Pg boundary likely attributable to Deccan Traps activity. The increased carbon dioxide emissions also caused acid rain, evidenced by increased mercury deposition due to increased solubility of mercury compounds in more acidic water.

Evidence for extinctions caused by the Deccan Traps includes the reduction in diversity of marine life when the climate near the K–Pg boundary increased in temperature. The temperature increased about three to four degrees very rapidly between 65.4 and 65.2 million years ago, which is very near the time of the extinction event. Not only did the climate temperature increase, but the water temperature decreased, causing a drastic decrease in marine diversity. Evidence from Tunisia indicates that marine life was deleteriously affected by a major period of increased warmth and humidity linked to a pulse of intense Deccan Traps activity, and that marine extinctions there began before the impact event. Charophyte declines in the Songliao Basin, China before the asteroid impact have been concluded to be connected to climate changes caused by Deccan Traps activity.

In the years when the Deccan Traps hypothesis was linked to a slower extinction, Luis Alvarez (d. 1988) replied that paleontologists were being misled by sparse data. While his assertion was not initially well-received, later intensive field studies of fossil beds lent weight to his claim. Eventually, most paleontologists began to accept the idea that the mass extinctions at the end of the Cretaceous were largely or at least partly due to a massive Earth impact. Even Walter Alvarez acknowledged that other major changes might have contributed to the extinctions. More recent arguments against the Deccan Traps as an extinction cause include that the timeline of Deccan Traps activity and pulses of climate change has been found by some studies to be asynchronous, that palynological changes do not coincide with intervals of volcanism, and that many sites show climatic stability during the latest Maastrichtian and no sign of major disruptions caused by volcanism. A study published in 2020 concluded that the paleoclimatic data were most coherent with two peaks of degassing caused by the Deccan Traps eruptions, the first more than 200,000 years before the extinction, and a second peak starting around the extinction event and lasting about 355 000 years. The conclusion that the Deccan Traps did not cause the extinction is accepted by the paleontologist Michael Benton. Another study published in the same year argued that the long-term warming caused by the increased volcanism would have increased habitat suitability, not caused an extinction.

=== Maastrichtian sea-level regression ===
There is clear evidence that sea levels fell in the final stage of the Cretaceous by more than at any other time in the Mesozoic era. In some Maastrichtian stage rock layers from various parts of the world, the later layers are terrestrial; earlier layers represent shorelines and the earliest layers represent seabeds. These layers do not show the tilting and distortion associated with mountain building, therefore the likeliest explanation is a regression, a drop in sea level. There is no direct evidence for the cause of the regression, but the currently accepted explanation is that the mid-ocean ridges became less active and sank under their own weight.

A severe regression would have greatly reduced the continental shelf area, the most species-rich part of the sea, and therefore could have been enough to cause a marine mass extinction. This change would not have caused the extinction of the ammonites. The regression would also have caused climate changes, partly by disrupting winds and ocean currents and partly by reducing the Earth's albedo and increasing global temperatures. Marine regression also resulted in the loss of epeiric seas, such as the Western Interior Seaway of North America. The loss of these seas greatly altered habitats, removing coastal plains that ten million years before had been host to diverse communities such as are found in rocks of the Dinosaur Park Formation. Another consequence was an expansion of freshwater environments, since continental runoff now had longer distances to travel before reaching oceans. While this change was favorable to freshwater vertebrates, those that prefer marine environments, such as sharks, suffered.

However, sea level fall as a cause of the extinction event is contradicted by other evidence, namely that sections which show no sign of marine regression still show evidence of a major drop in diversity.

=== Multiple causes ===
Proponents of multiple causation view the suggested single causes as either too small to produce the vast scale of the extinction, or not likely to produce its observed taxonomic pattern. In a review article, J. David Archibald and David E. Fastovsky discussed a scenario combining three major postulated causes: volcanism, marine regression, and extraterrestrial impact. In this scenario, terrestrial and marine communities were stressed by the changes in, and loss of, habitats. Dinosaurs, as the largest vertebrates, were the first affected by environmental changes, and their diversity declined. At the same time, particulate materials from volcanism cooled and dried areas of the globe. Then an impact event occurred, causing collapses in photosynthesis-based food chains, both in the already-stressed terrestrial food chains and in the marine food chains.

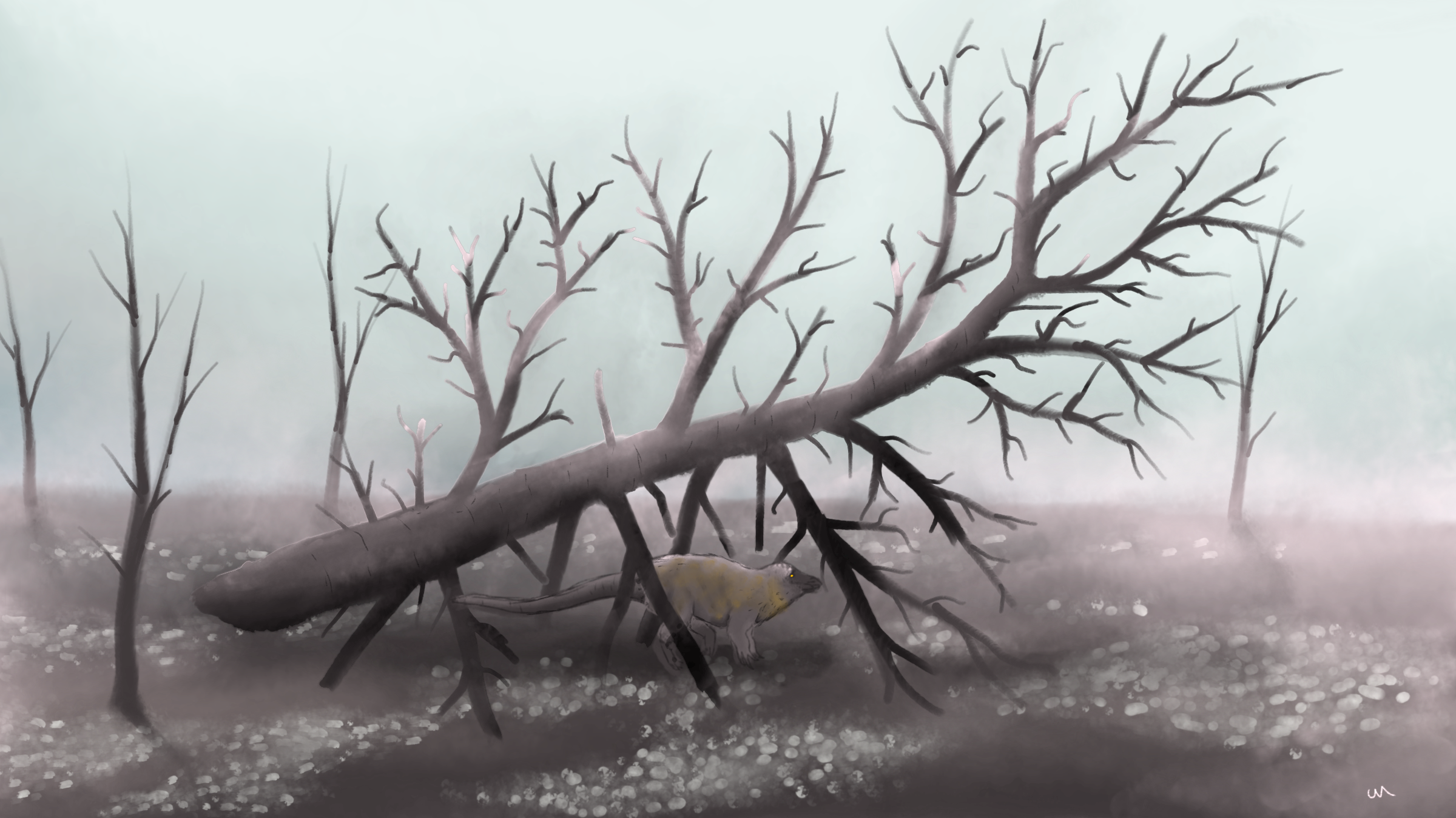
Artist's rendering of a Thescelosaurus shortly after the K–Pg event

Based on studies at Seymour Island in Antarctica, Sierra Petersen and colleagues argue that there were two separate extinction events near the Cretaceous–Paleogene boundary, with one correlating to Deccan Trap volcanism and one correlated with the Chicxulub impact. The team analyzed combined extinction patterns using a new clumped isotope temperature record from a hiatus-free, expanded K–Pg boundary section. They documented a 7.8±3.3 °C warming synchronous with the onset of Deccan Traps volcanism and a second, smaller warming at the time of meteorite impact. They suggested that local warming had been amplified due to the simultaneous disappearance of continental or sea ice. Intra-shell variability indicates a possible reduction in seasonality after Deccan eruptions began, continuing through the meteorite event. Species extinction at Seymour Island occurred in two pulses that coincide with the two observed warming events, directly linking the end-Cretaceous extinction at this site to both volcanic and meteorite events via climate change.

== See also ==
- Climate across Cretaceous–Paleogene boundary – Prehistoric climate changes
- Late Devonian extinction – Second of the big five mass extinctions
- List of possible impact structures on Earth
- Late Ordovician mass extinction – Mass extinction event c. 444 million years ago
- Permian–Triassic extinction event – Earth's most severe extinction event
- Timeline of Cretaceous–Paleogene extinction event research – Research timeline
- Triassic–Jurassic extinction – Mass extinction ending the Triassic period
