= Plaza Noroeste =

Plaza Noroeste Commercial Center
- Address: Carretera Jose Joaquin 'Yiye' Avila km 124.7, Cabán, Corrales, Aguadilla, Puerto Rico
- Opened: TBA
- Developer: Kanaan Corporation
- Architect: Vianca Contractors
- Num. of stores: 6
- Num. of anchor tenants: 1

The Plaza Noroeste Commercial Center is a community shopping center under construction in Aguadilla, Puerto Rico.

== History ==
The Plaza Noroeste has its origins in a petition started in early 2017 on Change.org by Isabela resident Xavier Félix, with the intention of establishing a Costco retail store in either Aguadilla or his hometown. The reason given was that "there [was] a large number of children with special needs and [in] need [of] a variety of foods, not found in most local markets" and the long drive to the nearest Costco, located in Bayamón, to obtain these foods.

== Development ==
Several days before the official announcement, rumours had been going around as to the opening of a Costco store in Aguadilla. On February 8, 2021, through his social media accounts, newly inaugurated Aguadillan mayor, Julio Roldán Concepción, announced "after 5 years of waiting [,] as part of the efforts of [his] administration" he had given the "green light" to the project. Roldán signed off on the last permits and construction effectively started on that date. He claimed that the five year long wait was due to the companies waiting for his election because "they wanted to benefit from my proposals for exemptions in municipal patents for new companies that would be established in Aguadilla."

The anchor tenant is expected to be Costco, yet the company had not made any public official announcements since it is "company policy not to comment on future warehouses...[until] it is generally two to three months" before the official opening date. Nevertheless, as of February 9, 2021, the agreement with Costco was said to be "advanced by 98 percent" to completion, which was expected to be in two weeks time after the green lighting. Up until then, Costco managed four stores in Puerto Rico, two in Bayamón, one between Río Piedras and Carolina, and another one in Caguas, thus it would be its first outside of the Metropolitan area and the first in the western region, yet the chain store had not announced any plans to open a fifth location. If Costco were to refuse, Roldán Concepción mentioned that there might be the option of having a Walmart Supercenter as a second choice anchor store.

In total there should be seven stores in the complex. Interested businesses include El Mesón Sandwiches, Cooperativa de Seguros Múltiples (an insurance company) and Chick-fil-A, nonetheless, as of February 10, 2021, no final agreements have been signed. Each of these would occupy a 5,000 ft^{2} (460 m^{2}) structures,. while Costco would occupy a 150,000 ft^{2} (14,000 m^{2}) warehouse. J Cajigas & Associates, the company in charge of dealing with potential tenants, has stated that the leasing or complete ownership of each structure is up to the agreement with each tenant. However, it was also reported that there might be 12 "free standing" structures, covering a total area of 650,000 ft^{2} (60,000 m^{2}).

The original investment was $5 million, yet this was expected to increase to a total of $40 million when the project would be finalized. The project is expected to last between 12 and 18 months and open late 2021 or early 2022, generating 150 jobs during its first phase. Another source quoted the mayor as saying that there 75 jobs created, and in the next month over 180 additional workers would be hired for construction. The total amount of jobs created was estimated to be between 300 and 400 by the time all stores opened and would present an influx of $1.5 million in patents. The project has received municipal and property tax exemptions for a year in exchange of hiring only Aguadillan employees.

Upon original announcement, it was not revealed where the shopping center would be located. Later on it was announced that Plaza Noroeste will be built on a plot of land between PR-2's 124.5 and 124.7 km of the José Joaquín "Yiye" Ávila stretch.
