= Liga Invernal de Béisbol Nayarita =

- Sport: Baseball
- Founded: 2000; 26 years ago
- Director: Ariel Lugo Corrales
- No. of teams: 12
- Country: Mexico
- Continent: North America
- Most recent champions: Tabaqueros de Santiago (5th title)
- Most titles: Tabaqueros de Santiago (5 titles each)
- Broadcaster: TVC Deportes

The Liga Invernal de Béisbol Nayarita (formerly known as Liga Nayarit de Béisbol and Liga de Béisbol del Noroeste) is a twelve-team baseball league in the Mexican state of Nayarit. Founded in 2000, it was a winter affiliate of the Mexican League.

== Teams ==
Team	City	Stadium
Cachorros de Acaponeta	Acaponeta, Nayarit	Municipal de Acaponeta
Camaroneros de Tecuala	Coatepec, Veracruz	Santos Ramos Contreras
Cañeros de Xalisco	Xalisco, Nayarit	
Coqueros de Tuxpan	Tuxpan, Nayarit	Lorenzo López Ibáñez
Eloteros de Jala	Jala, Nayarit	
Jaibos de Sayulita	Sayulita, Nayarit	Estadio Manuel Rodriquez Sanchez
Laguneros de SAMAO	Santa María del Oro, Nayarit	
Pureros de Compostela	Compostela, Nayarit	Gilberto Flores Muñoz
Tabaqueros de Santiago	Santiago Ixcuintla, Nayarit	Revolución
Tiburoneros de San Blas	San Blas, Nayarit	
Universitarios de Tepic	Tepic, Nayarit	Universitario de Tepic
Vaqueros de Rosamorada	Chilapa, Nayarit	

== Champions ==
=== Liga de Béisbol del Noroeste de México ===
Season	Champion
2000	Camaroneros de Tecuala
2000	Coqueros de Tuxpan
2001	Pureros de Compostela
2002	Tabaqueros de Santiago
2004	Pureros de Compostela
2005	Diablos Rojos Universitarios de Tepic
2006	Diablos Rojos Universitarios de Tepic
2007-2008	Pureros de Compostela
2008-2009	Diablos Rojos Universitarios de Tepic
2009-2010	Tabaqueros de Santiago
2010-2011	Tabaqueros de Santiago
2011-2012	Broncos de Tecuala
2012-2013	Cachorros de Acaponeta
2013-2014	Diablos Rojos Universitarios de Tepic
2014-2015	Cachorros de Acaponeta

=== Liga Nayarit de Béisbol ===
Season	Champion
2015-2016	Coqueros de Tuxpan
2016-2017	Tabaqueros de Santiago
2017-2018	Tabaqueros de Santiago

== Liga Nayarit de Béisbol Championships by team ==
Team	Championships	Season
Tabaqueros de Santiago	5	2002, 2010, 2011, 2017, 2018
Universitarios de Tepic	4	2005, 2006, 2009, 2014
Pureros de Compostela	3	2001, 2004, 2008
Cachorros de Acaponeta	2	2013, 2015
Coqueros de Tuxpan	2	2000 (Winter), 2016
Camaroneros de Tecuala	1	2000 (Summer)
Broncos de Tecuala	1	2012
