= Noroeste, Yucatán =

Noroeste
- Region
- Country: Mexico
- State: Yucatán
- Time zone: UTC−6 (CST)

Noroeste is one of the regions of Yucatán, Mexico.
