= Chicxulub Pueblo Municipality =

Municipality in the Mexican state of Yucatán

Chicxulub Pueblo
- Municipality
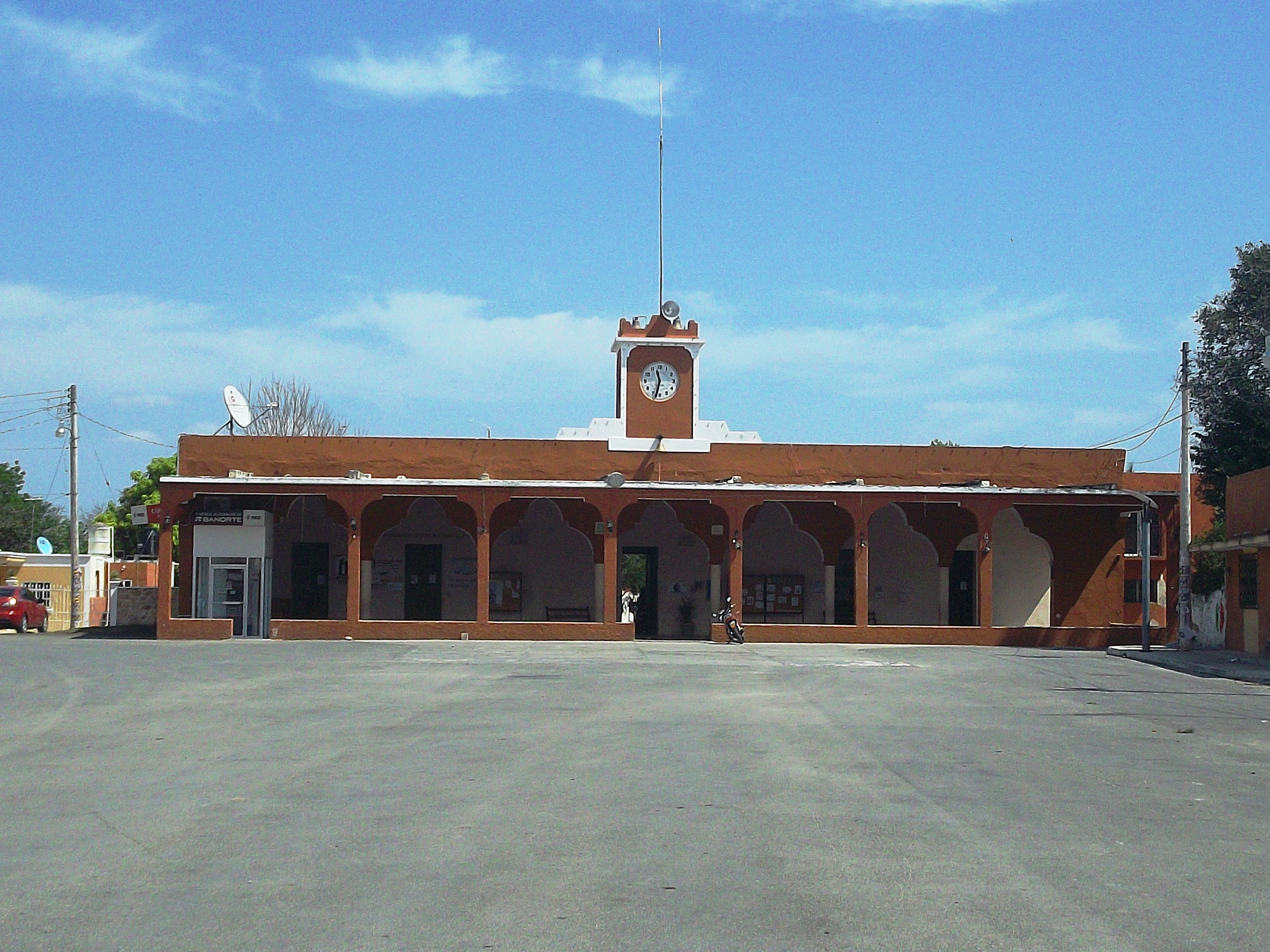
- Municipal Palace

- Coat of arms

- Location of Chicxulub Pueblo in Yucatan

- Region 2 Noroeste #020

- Location of the Municipality in Mexico
- Coordinates: 21°08′11″N 89°31′00″W
- Country: Mexico
- State: Yucatán

Government
  - Type: 2018–2021
  - Municipal President: Guadalupe Canto Ale (Institutional Revolutionary Party)

Area
  - Total: 196.72 km^{2} (75.95 sq mi)
- Elevation: 2 m (6.6 ft)

Population (2010)
  - Total: 4,113
- Time zone: UTC-6 (Central Standard Time)
- INEGI Code: 009
- Major Airport: Merida (Manuel Crescencio Rejón) International Airport
- IATA Code: MID
- ICAO Code: MMMD

Chicxulub Pueblo Municipality is a municipality in the Mexican state of Yucatán containing 196.72 km^{2} of land and located roughly 25 km north of the city of Mérida. The area is directly onshore of the epicenter of the Chicxulub crater.

== History ==
In ancient times, the area was part of the chieftainship of Ceh-Pech until the conquest. At colonization, Chicxulub Pueblo became part of the encomienda system with Julián Doncel recorded as the encomendero in 1549.

In 1821, Yucatán was declared independent of the Spanish Crown. In 1905, Chicxulub belonged to the region headquartered in Izamal. In the second half of the nineteenth century, Chicxulub Pueblo was joined to the municipality of Tixkokob, but 1918, Chicxulub became head of its own municipality.

== Governance ==
The municipal president is elected for a term of three years. The president appoints Councilpersons to serve on the board for three year terms, as the Secretary of Public Works, Councilperson of maintenance and sanitation, Councilperson of nomenclature and the Councilperson of Ecology, Parks and Public Gardens.

The Municipal Council administers the business of the municipality. It is responsible for budgeting and expenditures and producing all required reports for all branches of the municipal administration. Annually it determines educational standards for schools.

The Police Commissioners ensure public order and safety. They are tasked with enforcing regulations, distributing materials and administering rulings of general compliance issued by the council.

== Communities ==
The head of the municipality is Chicxulub Pueblo, Yucatán. There are 8 other population centers, including Cofradia, Guadalupe, Lactún, Pedregal, San José Chacán, Santa María Ontiveros, Uaymitún Puerto and Xiutumuc. The major population areas are shown below:

Community	Population
Entire Municipality (2010)	4,113
Chicxulub Pueblo	3820 in 2005
Santa María Ontiveros	18 in 2005

== Local festivals ==
Every year on 2 February the feast of the Virgin of Candelaria is celebrated and on 3 May, a festival of the Holy Cross occurs. From 1 to 9 October the Procession of Christ of the Blisters is observed.

== Tourist attractions ==
- Archaeological site Chakán
- Archaeological site Lactún
- Church of Santiago
- Hacienda Lactún
- Hacienda San José Kuché
- Hacienda Santa María Ontiveros
