= Meanings of minor-planet names: 364001–365000 =

As minor planet discoveries are confirmed, they are given a permanent number by the IAU's Minor Planet Center (MPC), and the discoverers can then submit names for them, following the IAU's naming conventions. The list below concerns those minor planets in the specified number-range that have received names, and explains the meanings of those names.

Official naming citations of newly named small Solar System bodies are approved and published in a bulletin by IAU's Working Group for Small Bodies Nomenclature (WGSBN). Before May 2021, citations were published in MPC's Minor Planet Circulars for many decades. Recent citations can also be found on the JPL Small-Body Database (SBDB). Until his death in 2016, German astronomer Lutz D. Schmadel compiled these citations into the Dictionary of Minor Planet Names (DMP) and regularly updated the collection.

Based on Paul Herget's The Names of the Minor Planets, Schmadel also researched the unclear origin of numerous asteroids, most of which had been named prior to World War II. This article incorporates text from this source, which is in the public domain: SBDB New namings may only be added to this list below after official publication as the preannouncement of names is condemned. The WGSBN publishes a comprehensive guideline for the naming rules of non-cometary small Solar System bodies.

== 364001–364100 ==
Named minor planet	Provisional	This minor planet was named for...	Ref · Catalog
There are no named minor planets in this number range

== 364101–364200 ==
back to top

Named minor planet	Provisional	This minor planet was named for...	Ref · Catalog
364166 Trebek	2006 JB	Alex Trebek (1940–2020) was a Canadian-American television personality and game show host, who hosted the game show Jeopardy for over 36 years. He was awarded seven Outstanding Game Show Host Emmy Awards between 1989 and 2020. He also was awarded a star on the Hollywood Walk of Fame in 1999.	IAU · 364166
364192 Qianruhu	2006 QR_{1}	Qian Ruhu (born 1950) is a veteran amateur astronomer from Shanghai, China. He has written numerous articles on astronomy-related topics since the early 1980s, many of which were published by the magazine Amateur Astronomers.	JPL · 364192

== 364201–364300 ==
back to top

Named minor planet	Provisional	This minor planet was named for...	Ref · Catalog
364264 Martymartina	2006 TP_{7}	Martina Maestripieri (born 1983) is an active amateur astronomer and member of the Gruppo Astrofili Montagna Pistoiese. She deals with astrometry of minor planets and comets, in particular the follow-up of NEOs. She also contributed to the discovery of the Haumea ring via a stellar occultation.	JPL · 364264

== 364301–364400 ==
back to top

Named minor planet	Provisional	This minor planet was named for...	Ref · Catalog
There are no named minor planets in this number range

== 364401–364500 ==
back to top

Named minor planet	Provisional	This minor planet was named for...	Ref · Catalog
There are no named minor planets in this number range

== 364501–364600 ==
back to top

Named minor planet	Provisional	This minor planet was named for...	Ref · Catalog
364566 Yurga	2007 PM_{8}	Yurga is a town in Kemerovskaya region, in Central Russia, located on the Tom' River, and the birthplace of the discoverer. He dedicates this name to his parents, Nina Pavlovna Rumyantseva (1940–2005) and Vladimir Vasil'evich Rumyantsev (1936–2018).	IAU · 364566
364577 Cachopito	2007 RC_{35}	Fernando Izquierdo Lacruz "Cachopito" (born 1986) is an audio engineer and a dub artist living in Madrid, Spain. He is the elder nephew of the discoverer	IAU · 364577

== 364601–364700 ==
back to top

Named minor planet	Provisional	This minor planet was named for...	Ref · Catalog
364630 Shizuoka	2007 TS_{70}	Shizuoka City, Japan.	JPL · 364630
364636 Ulrikeecker	2007 TR_{105}	Ulrike Ecker (born 1967), wife of Austrian discoverer Hannes Bachleitner	JPL · 364636

== 364701–364800 ==
back to top

Named minor planet	Provisional	This minor planet was named for...	Ref · Catalog
There are no named minor planets in this number range

== 364801–364900 ==
back to top

Named minor planet	Provisional	This minor planet was named for...	Ref · Catalog
364875 Hualookeng	2008 DP_{89}	Hua Loo-Keng (1910–1985), an academician of Chinese Academy of Sciences, is hailed as the father of modern mathematics in China. Mathematical accomplishments named after him include Hua's Theorem, the Cartan-Brauer-Hua Theorem, Hua's Inequation, the Weil-Hua Inequation and the Hua-Wang Method.	IAU · 364875

== 364901–365000 ==
back to top

Named minor planet	Provisional	This minor planet was named for...	Ref · Catalog
There are no named minor planets in this number range

back to top

Preceded by 363,001–364,000	Meanings of minor-planet names List of minor planets: 364,001–365,000	Succeeded by 365,001–366,000
