= List of minor planets: 364001–365000 =

The following is a partial list of minor planets, running from minor-planet number 364001 through 365000, inclusive. The primary data for this and other partial lists is based on JPL's "Small-Body Orbital Elements" and data available from the Minor Planet Center. Critical list information is also provided by the MPC, unless otherwise specified from Lowell Observatory. A detailed description of the table's columns and additional sources are given on the main page including a complete list of every page in this series, and a statistical break-up on the dynamical classification of minor planets.

Also see the summary list of all named bodies in numerical and alphabetical order, and the corresponding naming citations for the number range of this particular list. New namings may only be added to this list after official publication, as the preannouncement of names is condemned by the Working Group for Small Bodies Nomenclature of the International Astronomical Union.

Near-Earth obj.	MBA (inner)	MBA (outer)	Centaur
Mars-crosser	MBA (middle)	Jupiter trojan	Trans-Neptunian obj.
Unclassified

== 364001–364100 ==
Designation			Discovery			Properties		Ref
Permanent	Provisional	Named after	Date	Site	Discoverer(s)	Category	Diam.	Ref
364001	2005 UO_{407}	—	October 30, 2005	Mount Lemmon	Mount Lemmon Survey	·	4.0 km	MPC · JPL
364002	2005 UQ_{434}	—	October 29, 2005	Mount Lemmon	Mount Lemmon Survey	KOR	1.3 km	MPC · JPL
364003	2005 UQ_{446}	—	October 29, 2005	Catalina	CSS	EOS	2.1 km	MPC · JPL
364004	2005 UH_{450}	—	October 31, 2005	Kitt Peak	Spacewatch	EOS	2.4 km	MPC · JPL
364005	2005 UC_{460}	—	October 28, 2005	Mount Lemmon	Mount Lemmon Survey	·	2.4 km	MPC · JPL
364006	2005 UR_{472}	—	October 26, 2005	Kitt Peak	Spacewatch	KOR	1.5 km	MPC · JPL
364007	2005 UE_{489}	—	October 23, 2005	Catalina	CSS	BRA	2.3 km	MPC · JPL
364008	2005 UC_{492}	—	October 24, 2005	Palomar	NEAT	EUN · slow	1.7 km	MPC · JPL
364009	2005 UD_{495}	—	October 26, 2005	Socorro	LINEAR	EUN	1.8 km	MPC · JPL
364010	2005 UE_{508}	—	October 22, 2005	Kitt Peak	Spacewatch	·	2.2 km	MPC · JPL
364011	2005 UZ_{509}	—	October 23, 2005	Palomar	NEAT	·	1.7 km	MPC · JPL
364012	2005 UR_{517}	—	October 25, 2005	Apache Point	A. C. Becker	EOS	1.9 km	MPC · JPL
364013	2005 UP_{523}	—	October 27, 2005	Apache Point	A. C. Becker	AGN	1.0 km	MPC · JPL
364014	2005 UQ_{525}	—	October 25, 2005	Mount Lemmon	Mount Lemmon Survey	EOS	1.9 km	MPC · JPL
364015	2005 VD_{1}	—	November 3, 2005	Socorro	LINEAR	BAR	1.8 km	MPC · JPL
364016	2005 VY_{6}	—	October 25, 2005	Mount Lemmon	Mount Lemmon Survey	EOS	1.7 km	MPC · JPL
364017	2005 VU_{9}	—	November 2, 2005	Socorro	LINEAR	(5)	1.2 km	MPC · JPL
364018	2005 VA_{17}	—	November 3, 2005	Socorro	LINEAR	(116763)	2.4 km	MPC · JPL
364019	2005 VJ_{29}	—	November 4, 2005	Mount Lemmon	Mount Lemmon Survey	·	1.6 km	MPC · JPL
364020	2005 VF_{34}	—	November 2, 2005	Mount Lemmon	Mount Lemmon Survey	·	2.8 km	MPC · JPL
364021	2005 VJ_{37}	—	November 3, 2005	Catalina	CSS	·	2.5 km	MPC · JPL
364022	2005 VD_{59}	—	October 28, 2005	Catalina	CSS	·	2.1 km	MPC · JPL
364023	2005 VS_{75}	—	November 2, 2005	Socorro	LINEAR	·	4.5 km	MPC · JPL
364024	2005 VB_{77}	—	November 4, 2005	Catalina	CSS	·	2.2 km	MPC · JPL
364025	2005 VT_{116}	—	November 11, 2005	Kitt Peak	Spacewatch	·	4.2 km	MPC · JPL
364026	2005 VU_{125}	—	November 1, 2005	Apache Point	A. C. Becker	·	1.8 km	MPC · JPL
364027	2005 VC_{126}	—	November 1, 2005	Apache Point	A. C. Becker	·	2.5 km	MPC · JPL
364028	2005 VB_{128}	—	November 1, 2005	Apache Point	A. C. Becker	·	1.6 km	MPC · JPL
364029	2005 VA_{132}	—	November 1, 2005	Apache Point	A. C. Becker	·	4.2 km	MPC · JPL
364030	2005 WX_{9}	—	November 1, 2005	Mount Lemmon	Mount Lemmon Survey	·	2.0 km	MPC · JPL
364031	2005 WZ_{10}	—	November 22, 2005	Kitt Peak	Spacewatch	EMA	2.8 km	MPC · JPL
364032	2005 WY_{16}	—	October 29, 2005	Mount Lemmon	Mount Lemmon Survey	·	2.8 km	MPC · JPL
364033	2005 WJ_{33}	—	November 21, 2005	Kitt Peak	Spacewatch	EOS	2.1 km	MPC · JPL
364034	2005 WD_{35}	—	November 22, 2005	Kitt Peak	Spacewatch	·	3.7 km	MPC · JPL
364035	2005 WD_{40}	—	November 25, 2005	Mount Lemmon	Mount Lemmon Survey	·	2.8 km	MPC · JPL
364036	2005 WD_{46}	—	November 22, 2005	Kitt Peak	Spacewatch	TEL	1.4 km	MPC · JPL
364037	2005 WT_{48}	—	November 25, 2005	Kitt Peak	Spacewatch	·	2.5 km	MPC · JPL
364038	2005 WA_{49}	—	November 25, 2005	Kitt Peak	Spacewatch	·	4.2 km	MPC · JPL
364039	2005 WK_{59}	—	November 26, 2005	Mount Lemmon	Mount Lemmon Survey	KOR	1.3 km	MPC · JPL
364040	2005 WX_{65}	—	November 22, 2005	Kitt Peak	Spacewatch	·	2.5 km	MPC · JPL
364041	2005 WU_{66}	—	November 22, 2005	Kitt Peak	Spacewatch	VER	3.3 km	MPC · JPL
364042	2005 WP_{74}	—	October 1, 2005	Catalina	CSS	·	2.2 km	MPC · JPL
364043	2005 WN_{86}	—	November 28, 2005	Mount Lemmon	Mount Lemmon Survey	EOS	1.7 km	MPC · JPL
364044	2005 WK_{87}	—	November 28, 2005	Mount Lemmon	Mount Lemmon Survey	·	3.4 km	MPC · JPL
364045	2005 WH_{95}	—	November 26, 2005	Kitt Peak	Spacewatch	·	2.4 km	MPC · JPL
364046	2005 WV_{96}	—	November 26, 2005	Kitt Peak	Spacewatch	HYG	2.8 km	MPC · JPL
364047	2005 WJ_{103}	—	November 26, 2005	Catalina	CSS	·	3.0 km	MPC · JPL
364048	2005 WX_{110}	—	November 30, 2005	Kitt Peak	Spacewatch	·	2.5 km	MPC · JPL
364049	2005 WE_{117}	—	November 29, 2005	Socorro	LINEAR	·	2.0 km	MPC · JPL
364050	2005 WG_{135}	—	November 25, 2005	Mount Lemmon	Mount Lemmon Survey	·	2.8 km	MPC · JPL
364051	2005 WH_{141}	—	November 28, 2005	Mount Lemmon	Mount Lemmon Survey	KOR	1.3 km	MPC · JPL
364052	2005 WY_{143}	—	November 30, 2005	Kitt Peak	Spacewatch	·	4.0 km	MPC · JPL
364053	2005 WO_{145}	—	November 25, 2005	Kitt Peak	Spacewatch	EOS	1.8 km	MPC · JPL
364054	2005 WM_{147}	—	November 25, 2005	Catalina	CSS	·	2.0 km	MPC · JPL
364055	2005 WK_{152}	—	November 6, 2005	Kitt Peak	Spacewatch	·	3.8 km	MPC · JPL
364056	2005 WR_{152}	—	November 29, 2005	Kitt Peak	Spacewatch	·	3.8 km	MPC · JPL
364057	2005 WC_{162}	—	November 28, 2005	Mount Lemmon	Mount Lemmon Survey	·	2.7 km	MPC · JPL
364058	2005 WY_{184}	—	November 29, 2005	Socorro	LINEAR	·	2.5 km	MPC · JPL
364059	2005 WZ_{186}	—	November 6, 2005	Mount Lemmon	Mount Lemmon Survey	EOS	1.9 km	MPC · JPL
364060	2005 XS_{21}	—	December 2, 2005	Socorro	LINEAR	·	2.7 km	MPC · JPL
364061	2005 XA_{26}	—	December 4, 2005	Mount Lemmon	Mount Lemmon Survey	KOR	1.4 km	MPC · JPL
364062	2005 XY_{26}	—	December 4, 2005	Kitt Peak	Spacewatch	EOS	2.5 km	MPC · JPL
364063	2005 XZ_{29}	—	December 1, 2005	Kitt Peak	Spacewatch	EOS	1.7 km	MPC · JPL
364064	2005 XQ_{53}	—	December 4, 2005	Kitt Peak	Spacewatch	·	3.6 km	MPC · JPL
364065	2005 XZ_{61}	—	December 5, 2005	Socorro	LINEAR	·	1.8 km	MPC · JPL
364066	2005 XM_{63}	—	November 29, 2005	Kitt Peak	Spacewatch	·	1.8 km	MPC · JPL
364067	2005 XK_{66}	—	December 6, 2005	Socorro	LINEAR	·	2.1 km	MPC · JPL
364068	2005 XW_{74}	—	December 6, 2005	Kitt Peak	Spacewatch	·	2.8 km	MPC · JPL
364069	2005 XR_{91}	—	December 2, 2005	Kitt Peak	Spacewatch	·	2.4 km	MPC · JPL
364070	2005 XX_{107}	—	December 1, 2005	Kitt Peak	M. W. Buie	·	1.8 km	MPC · JPL
364071	2005 YX_{1}	—	December 21, 2005	Catalina	CSS	·	2.9 km	MPC · JPL
364072	2005 YZ_{14}	—	December 22, 2005	Kitt Peak	Spacewatch	·	760 m	MPC · JPL
364073	2005 YZ_{20}	—	December 24, 2005	Kitt Peak	Spacewatch	·	2.0 km	MPC · JPL
364074	2005 YL_{24}	—	December 24, 2005	Kitt Peak	Spacewatch	·	890 m	MPC · JPL
364075	2005 YL_{32}	—	December 22, 2005	Kitt Peak	Spacewatch	·	3.6 km	MPC · JPL
364076	2005 YX_{42}	—	December 24, 2005	Kitt Peak	Spacewatch	·	3.4 km	MPC · JPL
364077	2005 YX_{48}	—	December 22, 2005	Kitt Peak	Spacewatch	·	3.0 km	MPC · JPL
364078	2005 YQ_{50}	—	December 25, 2005	Kitt Peak	Spacewatch	·	540 m	MPC · JPL
364079	2005 YZ_{50}	—	December 25, 2005	Mount Lemmon	Mount Lemmon Survey	·	2.9 km	MPC · JPL
364080	2005 YP_{54}	—	December 25, 2005	Mount Lemmon	Mount Lemmon Survey	·	550 m	MPC · JPL
364081	2005 YR_{54}	—	December 25, 2005	Kitt Peak	Spacewatch	·	670 m	MPC · JPL
364082	2005 YL_{64}	—	October 1, 2005	Mount Lemmon	Mount Lemmon Survey	EOS	2.5 km	MPC · JPL
364083	2005 YL_{69}	—	December 26, 2005	Kitt Peak	Spacewatch	·	2.5 km	MPC · JPL
364084	2005 YZ_{80}	—	December 24, 2005	Kitt Peak	Spacewatch	EOS	2.1 km	MPC · JPL
364085	2005 YL_{85}	—	December 25, 2005	Mount Lemmon	Mount Lemmon Survey	·	3.0 km	MPC · JPL
364086	2005 YP_{89}	—	December 26, 2005	Mount Lemmon	Mount Lemmon Survey	·	2.3 km	MPC · JPL
364087	2005 YU_{94}	—	November 12, 2005	Kitt Peak	Spacewatch	·	1.8 km	MPC · JPL
364088	2005 YS_{124}	—	December 26, 2005	Kitt Peak	Spacewatch	·	2.8 km	MPC · JPL
364089	2005 YT_{124}	—	December 26, 2005	Kitt Peak	Spacewatch	·	2.5 km	MPC · JPL
364090	2005 YN_{125}	—	December 5, 2005	Mount Lemmon	Mount Lemmon Survey	·	2.9 km	MPC · JPL
364091	2005 YO_{127}	—	December 24, 2005	Socorro	LINEAR	·	3.4 km	MPC · JPL
364092	2005 YK_{132}	—	December 25, 2005	Mount Lemmon	Mount Lemmon Survey	·	3.1 km	MPC · JPL
364093	2005 YF_{140}	—	December 28, 2005	Mount Lemmon	Mount Lemmon Survey	EOS	2.3 km	MPC · JPL
364094	2005 YL_{150}	—	December 25, 2005	Kitt Peak	Spacewatch	·	1.5 km	MPC · JPL
364095	2005 YT_{150}	—	October 30, 2005	Mount Lemmon	Mount Lemmon Survey	·	3.9 km	MPC · JPL
364096	2005 YB_{151}	—	December 25, 2005	Kitt Peak	Spacewatch	·	2.5 km	MPC · JPL
364097	2005 YF_{164}	—	December 29, 2005	Kitt Peak	Spacewatch	·	1.0 km	MPC · JPL
364098	2005 YG_{170}	—	December 27, 2005	Kitt Peak	Spacewatch	·	3.0 km	MPC · JPL
364099	2005 YH_{175}	—	October 27, 2005	Mount Lemmon	Mount Lemmon Survey	·	4.3 km	MPC · JPL
364100	2005 YH_{203}	—	December 25, 2005	Kitt Peak	Spacewatch	·	2.1 km	MPC · JPL

== 364101–364200 ==
back to top

Designation			Discovery			Properties		Ref
Permanent	Provisional	Named after	Date	Site	Discoverer(s)	Category	Diam.	Ref
364101	2005 YL_{214}	—	November 30, 2005	Kitt Peak	Spacewatch	EOS	2.4 km	MPC · JPL
364102	2005 YJ_{234}	—	December 2, 2005	Mount Lemmon	Mount Lemmon Survey	EOS	2.4 km	MPC · JPL
364103	2005 YY_{248}	—	December 4, 2005	Kitt Peak	Spacewatch	·	3.3 km	MPC · JPL
364104	2005 YA_{251}	—	December 28, 2005	Kitt Peak	Spacewatch	·	2.4 km	MPC · JPL
364105	2005 YJ_{270}	—	November 6, 2005	Kitt Peak	Spacewatch	·	3.2 km	MPC · JPL
364106	2005 YU_{270}	—	December 28, 2005	Mount Lemmon	Mount Lemmon Survey	·	4.0 km	MPC · JPL
364107	2005 YS_{278}	—	December 25, 2005	Mount Lemmon	Mount Lemmon Survey	·	4.1 km	MPC · JPL
364108	2005 YA_{285}	—	December 28, 2005	Kitt Peak	Spacewatch	EOS	2.5 km	MPC · JPL
364109	2006 AC_{1}	—	January 2, 2006	Mount Lemmon	Mount Lemmon Survey	·	2.9 km	MPC · JPL
364110	2006 AR_{5}	—	January 2, 2006	Catalina	CSS	PHO	2.0 km	MPC · JPL
364111	2006 AY_{15}	—	January 4, 2006	Kitt Peak	Spacewatch	EMA	3.5 km	MPC · JPL
364112	2006 AU_{18}	—	January 5, 2006	Kitt Peak	Spacewatch	·	700 m	MPC · JPL
364113	2006 AP_{28}	—	November 30, 2005	Mount Lemmon	Mount Lemmon Survey	·	2.6 km	MPC · JPL
364114	2006 AS_{38}	—	December 25, 2005	Kitt Peak	Spacewatch	·	2.9 km	MPC · JPL
364115	2006 AX_{38}	—	December 22, 2005	Kitt Peak	Spacewatch	·	2.9 km	MPC · JPL
364116	2006 AB_{52}	—	January 5, 2006	Kitt Peak	Spacewatch	·	2.8 km	MPC · JPL
364117	2006 AS_{57}	—	January 8, 2006	Catalina	CSS	·	2.2 km	MPC · JPL
364118	2006 AV_{61}	—	January 5, 2006	Kitt Peak	Spacewatch	·	3.3 km	MPC · JPL
364119	2006 AR_{86}	—	January 5, 2006	Socorro	LINEAR	·	2.4 km	MPC · JPL
364120	2006 AM_{91}	—	January 7, 2006	Kitt Peak	Spacewatch	·	2.5 km	MPC · JPL
364121	2006 AF_{104}	—	January 5, 2006	Mount Lemmon	Mount Lemmon Survey	VER	2.3 km	MPC · JPL
364122	2006 AY_{104}	—	January 6, 2006	Kitt Peak	Spacewatch	·	2.2 km	MPC · JPL
364123	2006 BM_{68}	—	January 23, 2006	Kitt Peak	Spacewatch	·	750 m	MPC · JPL
364124	2006 BY_{78}	—	January 23, 2006	Mount Lemmon	Mount Lemmon Survey	·	850 m	MPC · JPL
364125	2006 BM_{84}	—	January 25, 2006	Kitt Peak	Spacewatch	·	4.5 km	MPC · JPL
364126	2006 BH_{93}	—	January 26, 2006	Kitt Peak	Spacewatch	·	730 m	MPC · JPL
364127	2006 BK_{142}	—	January 26, 2006	Kitt Peak	Spacewatch	·	880 m	MPC · JPL
364128	2006 BT_{182}	—	January 27, 2006	Mount Lemmon	Mount Lemmon Survey	·	700 m	MPC · JPL
364129	2006 BA_{188}	—	January 28, 2006	Kitt Peak	Spacewatch	·	800 m	MPC · JPL
364130	2006 BH_{205}	—	January 31, 2006	Kitt Peak	Spacewatch	·	3.5 km	MPC · JPL
364131	2006 BO_{230}	—	January 31, 2006	Kitt Peak	Spacewatch	·	600 m	MPC · JPL
364132	2006 BN_{231}	—	January 31, 2006	Kitt Peak	Spacewatch	·	3.1 km	MPC · JPL
364133	2006 BG_{238}	—	January 23, 2006	Kitt Peak	Spacewatch	·	3.9 km	MPC · JPL
364134	2006 BQ_{239}	—	January 7, 2006	Mount Lemmon	Mount Lemmon Survey	·	2.9 km	MPC · JPL
364135	2006 BL_{280}	—	January 27, 2006	Mount Lemmon	Mount Lemmon Survey	·	740 m	MPC · JPL
364136	2006 CJ	—	February 1, 2006	Siding Spring	SSS	ATE · PHA	330 m	MPC · JPL
364137	2006 CM_{4}	—	February 1, 2006	Mount Lemmon	Mount Lemmon Survey	·	670 m	MPC · JPL
364138	2006 CF_{14}	—	January 23, 2006	Mount Lemmon	Mount Lemmon Survey	·	3.4 km	MPC · JPL
364139	2006 CC_{68}	—	February 1, 2006	Mount Lemmon	Mount Lemmon Survey	·	4.1 km	MPC · JPL
364140	2006 DM_{11}	—	February 21, 2006	Catalina	CSS	·	1.2 km	MPC · JPL
364141	2006 DC_{42}	—	February 24, 2006	Catalina	CSS	·	490 m	MPC · JPL
364142	2006 DN_{62}	—	February 25, 2006	Socorro	LINEAR	·	840 m	MPC · JPL
364143	2006 DE_{135}	—	February 25, 2006	Mount Lemmon	Mount Lemmon Survey	·	630 m	MPC · JPL
364144	2006 DN_{135}	—	February 25, 2006	Mount Lemmon	Mount Lemmon Survey	·	780 m	MPC · JPL
364145	2006 DX_{142}	—	February 25, 2006	Kitt Peak	Spacewatch	·	650 m	MPC · JPL
364146	2006 DW_{210}	—	February 20, 2006	Kitt Peak	Spacewatch	·	670 m	MPC · JPL
364147	2006 FD_{12}	—	March 23, 2006	Kitt Peak	Spacewatch	·	3.4 km	MPC · JPL
364148	2006 FA_{13}	—	March 23, 2006	Kitt Peak	Spacewatch	·	660 m	MPC · JPL
364149	2006 FT_{36}	—	March 22, 2006	Catalina	CSS	PHO	1.0 km	MPC · JPL
364150	2006 FK_{49}	—	March 25, 2006	Catalina	CSS	PHO	1.1 km	MPC · JPL
364151	2006 FD_{53}	—	March 24, 2006	Mount Lemmon	Mount Lemmon Survey	·	720 m	MPC · JPL
364152	2006 GW_{9}	—	April 2, 2006	Kitt Peak	Spacewatch	·	610 m	MPC · JPL
364153	2006 GX_{40}	—	April 7, 2006	Catalina	CSS	·	990 m	MPC · JPL
364154	2006 GE_{52}	—	December 28, 2005	Kitt Peak	Spacewatch	EUP	4.1 km	MPC · JPL
364155	2006 GA_{55}	—	April 8, 2006	Kitt Peak	Spacewatch	·	600 m	MPC · JPL
364156	2006 HJ_{13}	—	April 19, 2006	Kitt Peak	Spacewatch	·	900 m	MPC · JPL
364157	2006 HQ_{27}	—	April 20, 2006	Kitt Peak	Spacewatch	·	1.0 km	MPC · JPL
364158	2006 HE_{40}	—	April 21, 2006	Kitt Peak	Spacewatch	V	670 m	MPC · JPL
364159	2006 HS_{47}	—	April 24, 2006	Kitt Peak	Spacewatch	·	720 m	MPC · JPL
364160	2006 HZ_{50}	—	April 26, 2006	Saint-Sulpice	B. Christophe	·	860 m	MPC · JPL
364161	2006 HS_{54}	—	April 21, 2006	Catalina	CSS	·	950 m	MPC · JPL
364162	2006 HF_{101}	—	April 30, 2006	Kitt Peak	Spacewatch	·	750 m	MPC · JPL
364163	2006 HR_{118}	—	April 30, 2006	Kitt Peak	Spacewatch	V	580 m	MPC · JPL
364164	2006 HE_{120}	—	April 30, 2006	Kitt Peak	Spacewatch	·	900 m	MPC · JPL
364165	2006 HO_{127}	—	April 28, 2006	Cerro Tololo	M. W. Buie	·	1.0 km	MPC · JPL
364166 Trebek	2006 JB	Trebek	May 1, 2006	Wrightwood	J. W. Young	·	910 m	MPC · JPL
364167	2006 JQ_{3}	—	May 2, 2006	Kitt Peak	Spacewatch	PHO	1.4 km	MPC · JPL
364168	2006 JX_{14}	—	May 1, 2006	Kitt Peak	Spacewatch	·	750 m	MPC · JPL
364169	2006 JA_{38}	—	May 5, 2006	Kitt Peak	Spacewatch	·	1.4 km	MPC · JPL
364170	2006 JZ_{54}	—	May 9, 2006	Mount Lemmon	Mount Lemmon Survey	·	1.2 km	MPC · JPL
364171	2006 JZ_{81}	—	May 1, 2006	Mauna Kea	Mauna Kea	cubewano (cold) · moon	122 km	MPC · JPL
364172	2006 KU_{16}	—	May 21, 2006	Catalina	CSS	·	1.4 km	MPC · JPL
364173	2006 KT_{25}	—	May 19, 2006	Mount Lemmon	Mount Lemmon Survey	·	750 m	MPC · JPL
364174	2006 KV_{47}	—	May 21, 2006	Kitt Peak	Spacewatch	·	880 m	MPC · JPL
364175	2006 KV_{49}	—	May 21, 2006	Kitt Peak	Spacewatch	·	650 m	MPC · JPL
364176	2006 KG_{62}	—	May 22, 2006	Kitt Peak	Spacewatch	V	660 m	MPC · JPL
364177	2006 KX_{89}	—	May 21, 2006	Mount Lemmon	Mount Lemmon Survey	·	790 m	MPC · JPL
364178	2006 KB_{92}	—	May 25, 2006	Kitt Peak	Spacewatch	NYS	870 m	MPC · JPL
364179	2006 KU_{138}	—	May 25, 2006	Mauna Kea	P. A. Wiegert	·	820 m	MPC · JPL
364180	2006 OA_{8}	—	July 20, 2006	Palomar	NEAT	MAS	710 m	MPC · JPL
364181	2006 OJ_{14}	—	July 21, 2006	Mount Lemmon	Mount Lemmon Survey	MAS	740 m	MPC · JPL
364182	2006 OF_{21}	—	July 21, 2006	Mount Lemmon	Mount Lemmon Survey	(5)	2.6 km	MPC · JPL
364183	2006 PJ_{2}	—	June 3, 2006	Mount Lemmon	Mount Lemmon Survey	NYS	1.2 km	MPC · JPL
364184	2006 PH_{7}	—	August 12, 2006	Palomar	NEAT	·	900 m	MPC · JPL
364185	2006 PF_{8}	—	August 13, 2006	Palomar	NEAT	·	1.0 km	MPC · JPL
364186	2006 PH_{8}	—	June 3, 2006	Mount Lemmon	Mount Lemmon Survey	NYS	860 m	MPC · JPL
364187	2006 PU_{10}	—	August 13, 2006	Palomar	NEAT	·	1.1 km	MPC · JPL
364188	2006 PC_{26}	—	March 10, 2005	Mount Lemmon	Mount Lemmon Survey	MAS	930 m	MPC · JPL
364189	2006 PP_{27}	—	August 13, 2006	Siding Spring	SSS	·	1.2 km	MPC · JPL
364190	2006 PJ_{36}	—	August 12, 2006	Palomar	NEAT	MAS	870 m	MPC · JPL
364191	2006 PU_{43}	—	August 13, 2006	Palomar	NEAT	NYS	1.1 km	MPC · JPL
364192 Qianruhu	2006 QR_{1}	Qianruhu	August 16, 2006	Lulin	LUSS	·	1.4 km	MPC · JPL
364193	2006 QA_{3}	—	August 17, 2006	Palomar	NEAT	NYS	1.2 km	MPC · JPL
364194	2006 QD_{3}	—	August 17, 2006	Palomar	NEAT	PHO	1.5 km	MPC · JPL
364195	2006 QD_{12}	—	August 16, 2006	Siding Spring	SSS	MAS	740 m	MPC · JPL
364196	2006 QE_{19}	—	August 17, 2006	Palomar	NEAT	·	1.1 km	MPC · JPL
364197	2006 QD_{21}	—	July 20, 2006	Palomar	NEAT	NYS	1.1 km	MPC · JPL
364198	2006 QN_{43}	—	August 18, 2006	Kitt Peak	Spacewatch	ERI	2.1 km	MPC · JPL
364199	2006 QC_{47}	—	August 20, 2006	Palomar	NEAT	·	1.3 km	MPC · JPL
364200	2006 QZ_{58}	—	August 19, 2006	Anderson Mesa	LONEOS	·	1.3 km	MPC · JPL

== 364201–364300 ==
back to top

Designation			Discovery			Properties		Ref
Permanent	Provisional	Named after	Date	Site	Discoverer(s)	Category	Diam.	Ref
364201	2006 QG_{76}	—	August 21, 2006	Kitt Peak	Spacewatch	NYS	1.4 km	MPC · JPL
364202	2006 QA_{81}	—	August 24, 2006	Palomar	NEAT	·	2.7 km	MPC · JPL
364203	2006 QO_{96}	—	August 16, 2006	Palomar	NEAT	MAS	940 m	MPC · JPL
364204	2006 QR_{100}	—	August 25, 2006	Socorro	LINEAR	·	1.5 km	MPC · JPL
364205	2006 QQ_{104}	—	August 28, 2006	Catalina	CSS	·	1.1 km	MPC · JPL
364206	2006 QC_{114}	—	August 27, 2006	Anderson Mesa	LONEOS	PHO	2.9 km	MPC · JPL
364207	2006 QC_{115}	—	August 27, 2006	Anderson Mesa	LONEOS	·	2.1 km	MPC · JPL
364208	2006 QS_{116}	—	August 27, 2006	Anderson Mesa	LONEOS	·	1.3 km	MPC · JPL
364209	2006 QW_{119}	—	August 28, 2006	Catalina	CSS	·	1.7 km	MPC · JPL
364210	2006 QB_{160}	—	August 19, 2006	Kitt Peak	Spacewatch	·	1.3 km	MPC · JPL
364211	2006 QO_{162}	—	August 21, 2006	Kitt Peak	Spacewatch	·	2.2 km	MPC · JPL
364212	2006 QO_{163}	—	August 29, 2006	Kitt Peak	Spacewatch	·	1.1 km	MPC · JPL
364213	2006 QQ_{166}	—	August 29, 2006	Anderson Mesa	LONEOS	·	2.0 km	MPC · JPL
364214	2006 RA_{6}	—	September 14, 2006	Kitt Peak	Spacewatch	·	1.5 km	MPC · JPL
364215	2006 RQ_{17}	—	September 14, 2006	Catalina	CSS	·	1.4 km	MPC · JPL
364216	2006 RP_{36}	—	September 14, 2006	Catalina	CSS	·	1.2 km	MPC · JPL
364217	2006 RU_{43}	—	September 14, 2006	Kitt Peak	Spacewatch	·	1.3 km	MPC · JPL
364218	2006 RV_{43}	—	September 14, 2006	Kitt Peak	Spacewatch	·	1.5 km	MPC · JPL
364219	2006 RX_{46}	—	September 14, 2006	Kitt Peak	Spacewatch	·	1.6 km	MPC · JPL
364220	2006 RQ_{50}	—	September 14, 2006	Kitt Peak	Spacewatch	·	1.7 km	MPC · JPL
364221	2006 RX_{54}	—	September 14, 2006	Kitt Peak	Spacewatch	EUN	1.2 km	MPC · JPL
364222	2006 RO_{56}	—	September 14, 2006	Kitt Peak	Spacewatch	·	1.2 km	MPC · JPL
364223	2006 RC_{73}	—	September 15, 2006	Kitt Peak	Spacewatch	·	1.3 km	MPC · JPL
364224	2006 RT_{94}	—	April 11, 2005	Kitt Peak	Spacewatch	·	1.4 km	MPC · JPL
364225	2006 SC_{29}	—	September 17, 2006	Kitt Peak	Spacewatch	·	2.4 km	MPC · JPL
364226	2006 SQ_{31}	—	August 24, 2006	Palomar	NEAT	·	1.4 km	MPC · JPL
364227	2006 SX_{43}	—	September 17, 2006	Catalina	CSS	NYS	1.1 km	MPC · JPL
364228	2006 SQ_{61}	—	September 16, 2006	Catalina	CSS	·	1.5 km	MPC · JPL
364229	2006 SY_{63}	—	September 21, 2006	Anderson Mesa	LONEOS	NYS	1.5 km	MPC · JPL
364230	2006 SN_{73}	—	September 19, 2006	Kitt Peak	Spacewatch	·	1.1 km	MPC · JPL
364231	2006 SX_{74}	—	September 19, 2006	Kitt Peak	Spacewatch	MAS	650 m	MPC · JPL
364232	2006 SW_{103}	—	September 19, 2006	Kitt Peak	Spacewatch	·	1.2 km	MPC · JPL
364233	2006 SQ_{119}	—	September 18, 2006	Catalina	CSS	EOS	2.4 km	MPC · JPL
364234	2006 SO_{147}	—	September 19, 2006	Kitt Peak	Spacewatch	·	1.1 km	MPC · JPL
364235	2006 SW_{149}	—	September 19, 2006	Kitt Peak	Spacewatch	·	1.5 km	MPC · JPL
364236	2006 SN_{150}	—	September 19, 2006	Kitt Peak	Spacewatch	·	1.9 km	MPC · JPL
364237	2006 SE_{152}	—	September 19, 2006	Kitt Peak	Spacewatch	·	1.3 km	MPC · JPL
364238	2006 SP_{164}	—	June 14, 2005	Kitt Peak	Spacewatch	EUN	1.5 km	MPC · JPL
364239	2006 SK_{185}	—	September 25, 2006	Kitt Peak	Spacewatch	·	2.0 km	MPC · JPL
364240	2006 SJ_{186}	—	September 25, 2006	Kitt Peak	Spacewatch	·	1.3 km	MPC · JPL
364241	2006 SE_{189}	—	September 26, 2006	Kitt Peak	Spacewatch	·	2.2 km	MPC · JPL
364242	2006 SX_{189}	—	September 26, 2006	Mount Lemmon	Mount Lemmon Survey	·	3.0 km	MPC · JPL
364243	2006 SK_{194}	—	September 26, 2006	Kitt Peak	Spacewatch	H	420 m	MPC · JPL
364244	2006 ST_{200}	—	September 24, 2006	Kitt Peak	Spacewatch	·	1.3 km	MPC · JPL
364245	2006 SW_{203}	—	September 25, 2006	Kitt Peak	Spacewatch	·	1.4 km	MPC · JPL
364246	2006 SD_{206}	—	September 25, 2006	Kitt Peak	Spacewatch	·	1.3 km	MPC · JPL
364247	2006 SA_{207}	—	September 25, 2006	Mount Lemmon	Mount Lemmon Survey	·	3.0 km	MPC · JPL
364248	2006 SJ_{230}	—	September 26, 2006	Socorro	LINEAR	EUN	1.2 km	MPC · JPL
364249	2006 ST_{248}	—	September 26, 2006	Kitt Peak	Spacewatch	PHO	820 m	MPC · JPL
364250	2006 SW_{287}	—	September 25, 2006	Catalina	CSS	H	530 m	MPC · JPL
364251	2006 SX_{295}	—	September 25, 2006	Kitt Peak	Spacewatch	·	2.2 km	MPC · JPL
364252	2006 SE_{316}	—	March 7, 1997	Kitt Peak	Spacewatch	·	2.2 km	MPC · JPL
364253	2006 SF_{318}	—	September 17, 2006	Kitt Peak	Spacewatch	·	1.4 km	MPC · JPL
364254	2006 SH_{318}	—	September 27, 2006	Kitt Peak	Spacewatch	ADE	2.9 km	MPC · JPL
364255	2006 SC_{327}	—	September 27, 2006	Kitt Peak	Spacewatch	(5)	820 m	MPC · JPL
364256	2006 SW_{328}	—	September 27, 2006	Kitt Peak	Spacewatch	·	2.0 km	MPC · JPL
364257	2006 SR_{347}	—	September 28, 2006	Kitt Peak	Spacewatch	(5)	1.3 km	MPC · JPL
364258	2006 SO_{351}	—	September 30, 2006	Catalina	CSS	·	1.6 km	MPC · JPL
364259	2006 SE_{353}	—	September 30, 2006	Catalina	CSS	·	2.0 km	MPC · JPL
364260	2006 SV_{364}	—	September 30, 2006	Catalina	CSS	·	1.4 km	MPC · JPL
364261	2006 SN_{365}	—	September 30, 2006	Mount Lemmon	Mount Lemmon Survey	·	2.3 km	MPC · JPL
364262	2006 SH_{386}	—	September 29, 2006	Apache Point	A. C. Becker	MAR	1.4 km	MPC · JPL
364263	2006 TL_{1}	—	September 18, 2006	Catalina	CSS	·	1.7 km	MPC · JPL
364264 Martymartina	2006 TP_{7}	Martymartina	October 11, 2006	San Marcello	L. Tesi, Fagioli, G.	MAS	750 m	MPC · JPL
364265	2006 TU_{15}	—	October 11, 2006	Kitt Peak	Spacewatch	H	500 m	MPC · JPL
364266	2006 TL_{22}	—	October 11, 2006	Kitt Peak	Spacewatch	MAR	910 m	MPC · JPL
364267	2006 TG_{27}	—	October 12, 2006	Kitt Peak	Spacewatch	·	1.6 km	MPC · JPL
364268	2006 TM_{29}	—	October 12, 2006	Kitt Peak	Spacewatch	·	1.4 km	MPC · JPL
364269	2006 TQ_{32}	—	October 12, 2006	Kitt Peak	Spacewatch	·	3.6 km	MPC · JPL
364270	2006 TY_{32}	—	October 12, 2006	Kitt Peak	Spacewatch	NEM	2.4 km	MPC · JPL
364271	2006 TU_{34}	—	October 12, 2006	Kitt Peak	Spacewatch	·	2.0 km	MPC · JPL
364272	2006 TU_{41}	—	October 12, 2006	Palomar	NEAT	·	1.9 km	MPC · JPL
364273	2006 TW_{48}	—	October 12, 2006	Kitt Peak	Spacewatch	·	1.1 km	MPC · JPL
364274	2006 TF_{52}	—	October 12, 2006	Kitt Peak	Spacewatch	·	1.7 km	MPC · JPL
364275	2006 TM_{52}	—	October 12, 2006	Kitt Peak	Spacewatch	·	1.8 km	MPC · JPL
364276	2006 TO_{52}	—	October 12, 2006	Kitt Peak	Spacewatch	·	1.5 km	MPC · JPL
364277	2006 TL_{53}	—	October 12, 2006	Kitt Peak	Spacewatch	·	1.7 km	MPC · JPL
364278	2006 TZ_{58}	—	October 13, 2006	Kitt Peak	Spacewatch	·	1.2 km	MPC · JPL
364279	2006 TC_{65}	—	September 30, 2006	Kitt Peak	Spacewatch	(13314)	1.9 km	MPC · JPL
364280	2006 TC_{66}	—	September 19, 2006	Catalina	CSS	·	1.3 km	MPC · JPL
364281	2006 TB_{71}	—	October 11, 2006	Palomar	NEAT	·	1.5 km	MPC · JPL
364282	2006 TG_{73}	—	October 11, 2006	Palomar	NEAT	·	2.4 km	MPC · JPL
364283	2006 TP_{78}	—	October 12, 2006	Kitt Peak	Spacewatch	·	2.7 km	MPC · JPL
364284	2006 TZ_{85}	—	October 2, 2006	Mount Lemmon	Mount Lemmon Survey	·	2.4 km	MPC · JPL
364285	2006 TF_{87}	—	October 13, 2006	Kitt Peak	Spacewatch	(5)	1.2 km	MPC · JPL
364286	2006 TO_{87}	—	October 13, 2006	Kitt Peak	Spacewatch	WIT	980 m	MPC · JPL
364287	2006 TJ_{89}	—	October 13, 2006	Kitt Peak	Spacewatch	·	2.5 km	MPC · JPL
364288	2006 TT_{89}	—	October 13, 2006	Kitt Peak	Spacewatch	·	2.2 km	MPC · JPL
364289	2006 TV_{89}	—	October 13, 2006	Kitt Peak	Spacewatch	EUN	1.4 km	MPC · JPL
364290	2006 TE_{93}	—	October 15, 2006	Kitt Peak	Spacewatch	H	490 m	MPC · JPL
364291	2006 TS_{97}	—	October 13, 2006	Kitt Peak	Spacewatch	·	2.4 km	MPC · JPL
364292	2006 TE_{100}	—	October 15, 2006	Kitt Peak	Spacewatch	·	1.5 km	MPC · JPL
364293	2006 TK_{103}	—	October 15, 2006	Kitt Peak	Spacewatch	·	1.2 km	MPC · JPL
364294	2006 TH_{108}	—	October 9, 2006	Palomar	NEAT	·	2.6 km	MPC · JPL
364295	2006 TJ_{124}	—	October 2, 2006	Mount Lemmon	Mount Lemmon Survey	(5)	1.7 km	MPC · JPL
364296	2006 TJ_{125}	—	October 12, 2006	Kitt Peak	Spacewatch	·	1.9 km	MPC · JPL
364297	2006 TL_{126}	—	October 4, 2006	Mount Lemmon	Mount Lemmon Survey	HNS	1.4 km	MPC · JPL
364298	2006 TD_{129}	—	October 4, 2006	Mount Lemmon	Mount Lemmon Survey	·	1.5 km	MPC · JPL
364299	2006 UG_{4}	—	October 17, 2006	Piszkéstető	K. Sárneczky	·	1.3 km	MPC · JPL
364300	2006 UE_{9}	—	October 16, 2006	Catalina	CSS	ADE	2.4 km	MPC · JPL

== 364301–364400 ==
back to top

Designation			Discovery			Properties		Ref
Permanent	Provisional	Named after	Date	Site	Discoverer(s)	Category	Diam.	Ref
364301	2006 UA_{14}	—	September 25, 2006	Mount Lemmon	Mount Lemmon Survey	·	2.1 km	MPC · JPL
364302	2006 UA_{15}	—	October 17, 2006	Mount Lemmon	Mount Lemmon Survey	·	1.4 km	MPC · JPL
364303	2006 UA_{22}	—	October 16, 2006	Kitt Peak	Spacewatch	·	1.5 km	MPC · JPL
364304	2006 UC_{28}	—	October 16, 2006	Kitt Peak	Spacewatch	·	1 km	MPC · JPL
364305	2006 UJ_{34}	—	October 16, 2006	Kitt Peak	Spacewatch	·	1.2 km	MPC · JPL
364306	2006 UJ_{35}	—	October 16, 2006	Catalina	CSS	(5)	1.2 km	MPC · JPL
364307	2006 UF_{36}	—	October 16, 2006	Kitt Peak	Spacewatch	PAD	2.4 km	MPC · JPL
364308	2006 UO_{39}	—	September 25, 2006	Mount Lemmon	Mount Lemmon Survey	·	1.1 km	MPC · JPL
364309	2006 UT_{40}	—	October 16, 2006	Kitt Peak	Spacewatch	·	1.0 km	MPC · JPL
364310	2006 UR_{43}	—	October 16, 2006	Kitt Peak	Spacewatch	·	1.1 km	MPC · JPL
364311	2006 UG_{44}	—	October 16, 2006	Kitt Peak	Spacewatch	·	1.2 km	MPC · JPL
364312	2006 UD_{47}	—	October 16, 2006	Kitt Peak	Spacewatch	·	1.8 km	MPC · JPL
364313	2006 UB_{54}	—	September 27, 2006	Mount Lemmon	Mount Lemmon Survey	·	1.1 km	MPC · JPL
364314	2006 UV_{62}	—	October 22, 2006	Las Cruces	Dixon, D. S.	·	2.0 km	MPC · JPL
364315	2006 UW_{68}	—	October 16, 2006	Catalina	CSS	·	1.2 km	MPC · JPL
364316	2006 UD_{70}	—	October 16, 2006	Catalina	CSS	PAL	4.0 km	MPC · JPL
364317	2006 UF_{71}	—	October 16, 2006	Kitt Peak	Spacewatch	·	1.6 km	MPC · JPL
364318	2006 UN_{74}	—	October 17, 2006	Kitt Peak	Spacewatch	·	1.5 km	MPC · JPL
364319	2006 UP_{80}	—	October 17, 2006	Mount Lemmon	Mount Lemmon Survey	·	2.1 km	MPC · JPL
364320	2006 UO_{85}	—	October 17, 2006	Mount Lemmon	Mount Lemmon Survey	·	1.5 km	MPC · JPL
364321	2006 UT_{86}	—	October 17, 2006	Mount Lemmon	Mount Lemmon Survey	·	1.3 km	MPC · JPL
364322	2006 UA_{87}	—	October 17, 2006	Mount Lemmon	Mount Lemmon Survey	GEF	1.2 km	MPC · JPL
364323	2006 UE_{90}	—	October 17, 2006	Kitt Peak	Spacewatch	·	1.4 km	MPC · JPL
364324	2006 UD_{100}	—	October 18, 2006	Kitt Peak	Spacewatch	EUN	1.2 km	MPC · JPL
364325	2006 UO_{102}	—	October 18, 2006	Kitt Peak	Spacewatch	·	2.0 km	MPC · JPL
364326	2006 UW_{112}	—	October 19, 2006	Kitt Peak	Spacewatch	·	3.2 km	MPC · JPL
364327	2006 UC_{114}	—	October 19, 2006	Kitt Peak	Spacewatch	·	1.6 km	MPC · JPL
364328	2006 UN_{114}	—	October 19, 2006	Kitt Peak	Spacewatch	·	1.5 km	MPC · JPL
364329	2006 UZ_{115}	—	October 19, 2006	Kitt Peak	Spacewatch	·	1.9 km	MPC · JPL
364330	2006 UG_{120}	—	October 19, 2006	Kitt Peak	Spacewatch	·	1.9 km	MPC · JPL
364331	2006 UK_{129}	—	October 2, 2006	Mount Lemmon	Mount Lemmon Survey	(18466)	2.4 km	MPC · JPL
364332	2006 UN_{136}	—	October 19, 2006	Catalina	CSS	·	2.2 km	MPC · JPL
364333	2006 UR_{137}	—	October 19, 2006	Mount Lemmon	Mount Lemmon Survey	·	1.3 km	MPC · JPL
364334	2006 UY_{139}	—	October 19, 2006	Kitt Peak	Spacewatch	·	1.8 km	MPC · JPL
364335	2006 US_{140}	—	October 19, 2006	Kitt Peak	Spacewatch	·	2.2 km	MPC · JPL
364336	2006 UD_{141}	—	October 19, 2006	Mount Lemmon	Mount Lemmon Survey	(5)	2.5 km	MPC · JPL
364337	2006 UJ_{143}	—	October 19, 2006	Palomar	NEAT	·	1.7 km	MPC · JPL
364338	2006 UD_{149}	—	October 20, 2006	Kitt Peak	Spacewatch	JUN	1.3 km	MPC · JPL
364339	2006 UA_{156}	—	October 21, 2006	Mount Lemmon	Mount Lemmon Survey	·	1.9 km	MPC · JPL
364340	2006 UX_{161}	—	October 2, 2006	Mount Lemmon	Mount Lemmon Survey	·	1.3 km	MPC · JPL
364341	2006 UR_{166}	—	October 21, 2006	Mount Lemmon	Mount Lemmon Survey	·	1.5 km	MPC · JPL
364342	2006 UM_{176}	—	February 7, 1999	Kitt Peak	Spacewatch	·	1.7 km	MPC · JPL
364343	2006 UZ_{181}	—	October 16, 2006	Catalina	CSS	·	2.7 km	MPC · JPL
364344	2006 UF_{182}	—	October 16, 2006	Catalina	CSS	·	1.2 km	MPC · JPL
364345	2006 UD_{192}	—	October 19, 2006	Catalina	CSS	V	860 m	MPC · JPL
364346	2006 UC_{197}	—	October 20, 2006	Kitt Peak	Spacewatch	·	2.4 km	MPC · JPL
364347	2006 UE_{198}	—	October 12, 2006	Kitt Peak	Spacewatch	·	1.5 km	MPC · JPL
364348	2006 UM_{198}	—	September 26, 2006	Mount Lemmon	Mount Lemmon Survey	·	920 m	MPC · JPL
364349	2006 UR_{199}	—	October 21, 2006	Mount Lemmon	Mount Lemmon Survey	·	1.7 km	MPC · JPL
364350	2006 UC_{205}	—	April 16, 2004	Palomar	NEAT	EUN	1.4 km	MPC · JPL
364351	2006 UF_{209}	—	October 23, 2006	Kitt Peak	Spacewatch	NYS	950 m	MPC · JPL
364352	2006 UH_{217}	—	October 27, 2006	Mount Lemmon	Mount Lemmon Survey	·	3.4 km	MPC · JPL
364353	2006 UW_{221}	—	October 17, 2006	Catalina	CSS	·	1.1 km	MPC · JPL
364354	2006 UA_{229}	—	October 22, 2006	Mount Lemmon	Mount Lemmon Survey	MAR	1.6 km	MPC · JPL
364355	2006 UV_{230}	—	October 21, 2006	Palomar	NEAT	·	1.3 km	MPC · JPL
364356	2006 UZ_{237}	—	October 23, 2006	Kitt Peak	Spacewatch	·	1.6 km	MPC · JPL
364357	2006 UR_{247}	—	October 27, 2006	Mount Lemmon	Mount Lemmon Survey	EOS	1.6 km	MPC · JPL
364358	2006 UH_{253}	—	October 27, 2006	Mount Lemmon	Mount Lemmon Survey	·	1.4 km	MPC · JPL
364359	2006 UY_{259}	—	October 28, 2006	Mount Lemmon	Mount Lemmon Survey	·	1.3 km	MPC · JPL
364360	2006 US_{269}	—	October 27, 2006	Kitt Peak	Spacewatch	MAR	1.4 km	MPC · JPL
364361	2006 UQ_{270}	—	October 27, 2006	Mount Lemmon	Mount Lemmon Survey	·	1.8 km	MPC · JPL
364362	2006 UM_{276}	—	October 28, 2006	Mount Lemmon	Mount Lemmon Survey	HNS	1.2 km	MPC · JPL
364363	2006 UP_{278}	—	October 28, 2006	Kitt Peak	Spacewatch	·	800 m	MPC · JPL
364364	2006 UW_{280}	—	October 28, 2006	Mount Lemmon	Mount Lemmon Survey	·	1.3 km	MPC · JPL
364365	2006 UE_{284}	—	September 30, 2006	Mount Lemmon	Mount Lemmon Survey	EOS	1.8 km	MPC · JPL
364366	2006 UM_{302}	—	October 19, 2006	Kitt Peak	M. W. Buie	·	940 m	MPC · JPL
364367	2006 UH_{313}	—	October 23, 2006	Kitt Peak	Spacewatch	·	1.5 km	MPC · JPL
364368	2006 UP_{334}	—	October 20, 2006	Kitt Peak	Spacewatch	·	1.4 km	MPC · JPL
364369	2006 UO_{335}	—	October 17, 2006	Mount Lemmon	Mount Lemmon Survey	·	1.4 km	MPC · JPL
364370	2006 VH_{4}	—	November 9, 2006	Kitt Peak	Spacewatch	·	1.3 km	MPC · JPL
364371	2006 VL_{7}	—	November 10, 2006	Kitt Peak	Spacewatch	MRX	1.0 km	MPC · JPL
364372	2006 VT_{9}	—	September 30, 2006	Catalina	CSS	EUN	1.6 km	MPC · JPL
364373	2006 VX_{15}	—	November 9, 2006	Kitt Peak	Spacewatch	·	1.8 km	MPC · JPL
364374	2006 VD_{17}	—	November 9, 2006	Kitt Peak	Spacewatch	·	1.3 km	MPC · JPL
364375	2006 VH_{17}	—	November 9, 2006	Kitt Peak	Spacewatch	·	2.0 km	MPC · JPL
364376	2006 VV_{19}	—	November 9, 2006	Kitt Peak	Spacewatch	·	1.5 km	MPC · JPL
364377	2006 VZ_{19}	—	October 31, 2006	Kitt Peak	Spacewatch	·	1.3 km	MPC · JPL
364378	2006 VS_{22}	—	October 19, 2006	Mount Lemmon	Mount Lemmon Survey	·	2.1 km	MPC · JPL
364379	2006 VW_{24}	—	November 10, 2006	Kitt Peak	Spacewatch	·	1.4 km	MPC · JPL
364380	2006 VC_{28}	—	November 10, 2006	Kitt Peak	Spacewatch	EUN	1.4 km	MPC · JPL
364381	2006 VT_{28}	—	November 10, 2006	Kitt Peak	Spacewatch	·	1.5 km	MPC · JPL
364382	2006 VU_{28}	—	November 10, 2006	Kitt Peak	Spacewatch	HOF	2.4 km	MPC · JPL
364383	2006 VT_{35}	—	November 11, 2006	Mount Lemmon	Mount Lemmon Survey	·	2.0 km	MPC · JPL
364384	2006 VC_{48}	—	September 28, 2006	Mount Lemmon	Mount Lemmon Survey	ADE	2.5 km	MPC · JPL
364385	2006 VR_{56}	—	November 11, 2006	Kitt Peak	Spacewatch	·	1.8 km	MPC · JPL
364386	2006 VN_{60}	—	November 11, 2006	Mount Lemmon	Mount Lemmon Survey	·	1.1 km	MPC · JPL
364387	2006 VN_{69}	—	November 11, 2006	Kitt Peak	Spacewatch	·	1.2 km	MPC · JPL
364388	2006 VV_{69}	—	November 11, 2006	Kitt Peak	Spacewatch	MRX	990 m	MPC · JPL
364389	2006 VN_{70}	—	November 11, 2006	Kitt Peak	Spacewatch	slow	1.8 km	MPC · JPL
364390	2006 VJ_{74}	—	November 11, 2006	Kitt Peak	Spacewatch	·	2.0 km	MPC · JPL
364391	2006 VW_{79}	—	November 12, 2006	Mount Lemmon	Mount Lemmon Survey	·	1.9 km	MPC · JPL
364392	2006 VL_{82}	—	November 2, 2006	Kitt Peak	Spacewatch	MAR	1.3 km	MPC · JPL
364393	2006 VT_{84}	—	November 13, 2006	Mount Lemmon	Mount Lemmon Survey	EUN	1.6 km	MPC · JPL
364394	2006 VE_{85}	—	November 13, 2006	Catalina	CSS	EUN	1.5 km	MPC · JPL
364395	2006 VJ_{87}	—	October 19, 2006	Kitt Peak	Spacewatch	·	1.5 km	MPC · JPL
364396	2006 VK_{89}	—	June 29, 2005	Palomar	NEAT	MAR	1.2 km	MPC · JPL
364397	2006 VH_{92}	—	November 15, 2006	Catalina	CSS	·	1.3 km	MPC · JPL
364398	2006 VV_{92}	—	November 15, 2006	Socorro	LINEAR	·	2.6 km	MPC · JPL
364399	2006 VQ_{98}	—	September 27, 2006	Mount Lemmon	Mount Lemmon Survey	HNS	1.4 km	MPC · JPL
364400	2006 VZ_{98}	—	November 11, 2006	Mount Lemmon	Mount Lemmon Survey	·	2.7 km	MPC · JPL

== 364401–364500 ==
back to top

Designation			Discovery			Properties		Ref
Permanent	Provisional	Named after	Date	Site	Discoverer(s)	Category	Diam.	Ref
364401	2006 VO_{102}	—	November 12, 2006	Mount Lemmon	Mount Lemmon Survey	·	2.2 km	MPC · JPL
364402	2006 VR_{105}	—	October 17, 2006	Mount Lemmon	Mount Lemmon Survey	·	1.5 km	MPC · JPL
364403	2006 VH_{111}	—	October 20, 2006	Mount Lemmon	Mount Lemmon Survey	·	1.4 km	MPC · JPL
364404	2006 VB_{112}	—	November 13, 2006	Catalina	CSS	(32418)	2.6 km	MPC · JPL
364405	2006 VR_{115}	—	November 14, 2006	Kitt Peak	Spacewatch	·	1.3 km	MPC · JPL
364406	2006 VW_{120}	—	November 14, 2006	Kitt Peak	Spacewatch	·	2.0 km	MPC · JPL
364407	2006 VF_{121}	—	November 14, 2006	Catalina	CSS	·	2.2 km	MPC · JPL
364408	2006 VE_{138}	—	November 15, 2006	Kitt Peak	Spacewatch	·	1.8 km	MPC · JPL
364409	2006 VJ_{140}	—	October 31, 2006	Mount Lemmon	Mount Lemmon Survey	·	2.0 km	MPC · JPL
364410	2006 VA_{153}	—	November 11, 2006	Catalina	CSS	·	2.0 km	MPC · JPL
364411	2006 VA_{171}	—	November 11, 2006	Kitt Peak	Spacewatch	·	1.0 km	MPC · JPL
364412	2006 WX_{2}	—	November 17, 2006	Kitt Peak	Spacewatch	H	610 m	MPC · JPL
364413	2006 WC_{3}	—	November 21, 2006	Catalina	CSS	H	750 m	MPC · JPL
364414	2006 WC_{4}	—	November 19, 2006	Needville	J. Dellinger	H	560 m	MPC · JPL
364415	2006 WG_{6}	—	November 16, 2006	Kitt Peak	Spacewatch	·	2.1 km	MPC · JPL
364416	2006 WC_{10}	—	October 23, 2006	Mount Lemmon	Mount Lemmon Survey	·	1.4 km	MPC · JPL
364417	2006 WU_{12}	—	November 16, 2006	Mount Lemmon	Mount Lemmon Survey	·	1.7 km	MPC · JPL
364418	2006 WX_{24}	—	November 17, 2006	Mount Lemmon	Mount Lemmon Survey	·	1.2 km	MPC · JPL
364419	2006 WK_{28}	—	September 27, 2006	Mount Lemmon	Mount Lemmon Survey	·	1.5 km	MPC · JPL
364420	2006 WC_{37}	—	November 16, 2006	Kitt Peak	Spacewatch	·	1.1 km	MPC · JPL
364421	2006 WU_{40}	—	November 16, 2006	Kitt Peak	Spacewatch	·	1.8 km	MPC · JPL
364422	2006 WR_{57}	—	November 17, 2006	Kitt Peak	Spacewatch	·	1.9 km	MPC · JPL
364423	2006 WJ_{71}	—	November 18, 2006	Kitt Peak	Spacewatch	·	1.4 km	MPC · JPL
364424	2006 WU_{74}	—	November 18, 2006	Kitt Peak	Spacewatch	NEM	2.1 km	MPC · JPL
364425	2006 WM_{78}	—	October 20, 2006	Mount Lemmon	Mount Lemmon Survey	·	1.2 km	MPC · JPL
364426	2006 WR_{90}	—	November 19, 2006	Socorro	LINEAR	·	2.1 km	MPC · JPL
364427	2006 WU_{93}	—	November 19, 2006	Kitt Peak	Spacewatch	MRX	1.1 km	MPC · JPL
364428	2006 WX_{94}	—	November 11, 2006	Kitt Peak	Spacewatch	·	1.8 km	MPC · JPL
364429	2006 WY_{101}	—	November 19, 2006	Catalina	CSS	·	2.0 km	MPC · JPL
364430	2006 WF_{107}	—	November 19, 2006	Catalina	CSS	MAR	1.1 km	MPC · JPL
364431	2006 WR_{110}	—	November 11, 2006	Mount Lemmon	Mount Lemmon Survey	·	3.2 km	MPC · JPL
364432	2006 WP_{142}	—	October 22, 2006	Mount Lemmon	Mount Lemmon Survey	·	1.4 km	MPC · JPL
364433	2006 WL_{143}	—	November 20, 2006	Kitt Peak	Spacewatch	·	1.7 km	MPC · JPL
364434	2006 WB_{164}	—	October 19, 2006	Mount Lemmon	Mount Lemmon Survey	·	1.9 km	MPC · JPL
364435	2006 WK_{179}	—	November 24, 2006	Mount Lemmon	Mount Lemmon Survey	AGN	940 m	MPC · JPL
364436	2006 WC_{182}	—	November 19, 2006	Kitt Peak	Spacewatch	·	1.0 km	MPC · JPL
364437	2006 WQ_{186}	—	October 23, 2006	Mount Lemmon	Mount Lemmon Survey	·	1.5 km	MPC · JPL
364438	2006 WC_{187}	—	November 23, 2006	Mount Lemmon	Mount Lemmon Survey	·	2.4 km	MPC · JPL
364439	2006 WK_{189}	—	November 25, 2006	Mount Lemmon	Mount Lemmon Survey	DOR	2.6 km	MPC · JPL
364440	2006 WG_{193}	—	November 27, 2006	Kitt Peak	Spacewatch	H	520 m	MPC · JPL
364441	2006 XC_{2}	—	December 11, 2006	Socorro	LINEAR	H	660 m	MPC · JPL
364442	2006 XR_{5}	—	December 6, 2006	Palomar	NEAT	ADE	2.4 km	MPC · JPL
364443	2006 XN_{17}	—	December 10, 2006	Kitt Peak	Spacewatch	slow	1.7 km	MPC · JPL
364444	2006 XF_{21}	—	December 11, 2006	Kitt Peak	Spacewatch	·	3.0 km	MPC · JPL
364445	2006 XG_{26}	—	December 12, 2006	Catalina	CSS	·	3.3 km	MPC · JPL
364446	2006 XR_{46}	—	December 13, 2006	Catalina	CSS	·	1.7 km	MPC · JPL
364447	2006 XS_{62}	—	September 26, 2006	Kitt Peak	Spacewatch	(5)	1.7 km	MPC · JPL
364448	2006 XU_{62}	—	November 21, 2006	Mount Lemmon	Mount Lemmon Survey	·	2.2 km	MPC · JPL
364449	2006 XD_{64}	—	December 11, 2006	Catalina	CSS	·	2.0 km	MPC · JPL
364450	2006 YE_{5}	—	December 17, 2006	Mount Lemmon	Mount Lemmon Survey	·	1.5 km	MPC · JPL
364451	2006 YA_{7}	—	December 20, 2006	Palomar	NEAT	·	1.9 km	MPC · JPL
364452	2006 YJ_{15}	—	December 20, 2006	Palomar	NEAT	(5)	1.5 km	MPC · JPL
364453	2006 YB_{22}	—	September 13, 2005	Kitt Peak	Spacewatch	KOR	1.3 km	MPC · JPL
364454	2006 YU_{22}	—	December 21, 2006	Kitt Peak	Spacewatch	·	2.9 km	MPC · JPL
364455	2006 YS_{55}	—	December 25, 2006	Catalina	CSS	·	2.5 km	MPC · JPL
364456	2007 AN	—	January 8, 2007	Kitt Peak	Spacewatch	·	2.0 km	MPC · JPL
364457	2007 AK_{8}	—	January 10, 2007	Mount Nyukasa	Japan Aerospace Exploration Agency	·	1.9 km	MPC · JPL
364458	2007 AO_{12}	—	January 10, 2007	Mount Lemmon	Mount Lemmon Survey	H	610 m	MPC · JPL
364459	2007 AW_{16}	—	January 15, 2007	Catalina	CSS	·	3.5 km	MPC · JPL
364460	2007 BR_{7}	—	January 17, 2007	Kitt Peak	Spacewatch	H	680 m	MPC · JPL
364461	2007 BR_{20}	—	January 16, 2007	Socorro	LINEAR	H	880 m	MPC · JPL
364462	2007 BC_{40}	—	January 24, 2007	Mount Lemmon	Mount Lemmon Survey	HOF	2.9 km	MPC · JPL
364463	2007 BY_{63}	—	January 27, 2007	Mount Lemmon	Mount Lemmon Survey	·	1.9 km	MPC · JPL
364464	2007 BD_{81}	—	November 5, 2005	Mount Lemmon	Mount Lemmon Survey	·	1.8 km	MPC · JPL
364465	2007 CE_{1}	—	February 6, 2007	Kitt Peak	Spacewatch	·	1.8 km	MPC · JPL
364466	2007 CC_{10}	—	February 6, 2007	Mount Lemmon	Mount Lemmon Survey	·	2.5 km	MPC · JPL
364467	2007 CD_{28}	—	January 27, 2007	Kitt Peak	Spacewatch	·	1.8 km	MPC · JPL
364468	2007 CS_{28}	—	January 27, 2007	Kitt Peak	Spacewatch	·	1.9 km	MPC · JPL
364469	2007 CJ_{57}	—	February 9, 2007	Catalina	CSS	·	2.7 km	MPC · JPL
364470	2007 CM_{65}	—	February 9, 2007	Kitt Peak	Spacewatch	·	3.7 km	MPC · JPL
364471	2007 DK_{11}	—	February 17, 2007	Kitt Peak	Spacewatch	·	2.8 km	MPC · JPL
364472	2007 DL_{16}	—	December 27, 2006	Mount Lemmon	Mount Lemmon Survey	·	2.5 km	MPC · JPL
364473	2007 DF_{21}	—	January 27, 2007	Mount Lemmon	Mount Lemmon Survey	·	2.2 km	MPC · JPL
364474	2007 DN_{23}	—	February 17, 2007	Kitt Peak	Spacewatch	·	1.7 km	MPC · JPL
364475	2007 DS_{30}	—	February 17, 2007	Kitt Peak	Spacewatch	·	2.4 km	MPC · JPL
364476	2007 DP_{34}	—	January 27, 2007	Mount Lemmon	Mount Lemmon Survey	·	2.9 km	MPC · JPL
364477	2007 DB_{35}	—	February 17, 2007	Kitt Peak	Spacewatch	·	2.9 km	MPC · JPL
364478	2007 DV_{35}	—	February 17, 2007	Kitt Peak	Spacewatch	EOS	2.1 km	MPC · JPL
364479	2007 DQ_{36}	—	February 17, 2007	Kitt Peak	Spacewatch	THM	2.5 km	MPC · JPL
364480	2007 DT_{38}	—	February 17, 2007	Kitt Peak	Spacewatch	THM	2.2 km	MPC · JPL
364481	2007 DB_{39}	—	February 17, 2007	Kitt Peak	Spacewatch	·	3.5 km	MPC · JPL
364482	2007 DO_{41}	—	February 17, 2007	Catalina	CSS	H	680 m	MPC · JPL
364483	2007 DE_{65}	—	February 21, 2007	Kitt Peak	Spacewatch	·	3.2 km	MPC · JPL
364484	2007 DE_{70}	—	September 28, 1994	Kitt Peak	Spacewatch	KOR	1.5 km	MPC · JPL
364485	2007 DY_{74}	—	February 21, 2007	Kitt Peak	Spacewatch	THM	2.2 km	MPC · JPL
364486	2007 DA_{95}	—	February 23, 2007	Kitt Peak	Spacewatch	·	4.1 km	MPC · JPL
364487	2007 DO_{96}	—	February 23, 2007	Mount Lemmon	Mount Lemmon Survey	(8737)	2.5 km	MPC · JPL
364488	2007 DM_{98}	—	February 25, 2007	Mount Lemmon	Mount Lemmon Survey	·	2.0 km	MPC · JPL
364489	2007 DQ_{106}	—	February 17, 2007	Kitt Peak	Spacewatch	·	1.3 km	MPC · JPL
364490	2007 DM_{114}	—	February 26, 2007	Mount Lemmon	Mount Lemmon Survey	HYG	2.7 km	MPC · JPL
364491	2007 DQ_{117}	—	February 27, 2007	Kitt Peak	Spacewatch	·	4.0 km	MPC · JPL
364492	2007 EX_{1}	—	February 21, 2007	Mount Lemmon	Mount Lemmon Survey	·	2.3 km	MPC · JPL
364493	2007 EH_{4}	—	March 9, 2007	Mount Lemmon	Mount Lemmon Survey	BRA	1.9 km	MPC · JPL
364494	2007 EC_{8}	—	March 9, 2007	Palomar	NEAT	·	4.6 km	MPC · JPL
364495	2007 EO_{11}	—	March 9, 2007	Kitt Peak	Spacewatch	(18466)	3.0 km	MPC · JPL
364496	2007 EH_{30}	—	March 9, 2007	Palomar	NEAT	·	2.4 km	MPC · JPL
364497	2007 ET_{31}	—	February 6, 2007	Kitt Peak	Spacewatch	·	2.3 km	MPC · JPL
364498	2007 EH_{39}	—	March 10, 2007	Eskridge	G. Hug	EOS	2.4 km	MPC · JPL
364499	2007 EY_{53}	—	March 11, 2007	Mount Lemmon	Mount Lemmon Survey	EUP	4.1 km	MPC · JPL
364500	2007 EU_{57}	—	March 9, 2007	Catalina	CSS	EOS	2.4 km	MPC · JPL

== 364501–364600 ==
back to top

Designation			Discovery			Properties		Ref
Permanent	Provisional	Named after	Date	Site	Discoverer(s)	Category	Diam.	Ref
364501	2007 EA_{61}	—	March 10, 2007	Kitt Peak	Spacewatch	·	2.4 km	MPC · JPL
364502	2007 EV_{67}	—	February 25, 2007	Mount Lemmon	Mount Lemmon Survey	LIX	3.1 km	MPC · JPL
364503	2007 EV_{72}	—	March 10, 2007	Mount Lemmon	Mount Lemmon Survey	THM	2.5 km	MPC · JPL
364504	2007 EL_{74}	—	March 10, 2007	Kitt Peak	Spacewatch	·	2.6 km	MPC · JPL
364505	2007 EF_{75}	—	March 10, 2007	Kitt Peak	Spacewatch	·	3.2 km	MPC · JPL
364506	2007 EX_{75}	—	March 10, 2007	Kitt Peak	Spacewatch	·	2.9 km	MPC · JPL
364507	2007 EY_{88}	—	March 9, 2007	Kitt Peak	Spacewatch	·	2.2 km	MPC · JPL
364508	2007 EH_{89}	—	February 21, 2007	Mount Lemmon	Mount Lemmon Survey	·	1.9 km	MPC · JPL
364509	2007 EU_{92}	—	March 10, 2007	Mount Lemmon	Mount Lemmon Survey	·	2.4 km	MPC · JPL
364510	2007 EG_{96}	—	March 10, 2007	Mount Lemmon	Mount Lemmon Survey	·	2.4 km	MPC · JPL
364511	2007 EY_{97}	—	March 11, 2007	Kitt Peak	Spacewatch	·	2.5 km	MPC · JPL
364512	2007 EE_{100}	—	February 23, 2007	Mount Lemmon	Mount Lemmon Survey	THM	2.2 km	MPC · JPL
364513	2007 EJ_{118}	—	March 13, 2007	Mount Lemmon	Mount Lemmon Survey	THM	2.4 km	MPC · JPL
364514	2007 EU_{128}	—	March 9, 2007	Mount Lemmon	Mount Lemmon Survey	·	2.2 km	MPC · JPL
364515	2007 EF_{132}	—	February 23, 2007	Kitt Peak	Spacewatch	·	2.7 km	MPC · JPL
364516	2007 EK_{139}	—	February 26, 2007	Mount Lemmon	Mount Lemmon Survey	·	1.9 km	MPC · JPL
364517	2007 EC_{145}	—	March 12, 2007	Mount Lemmon	Mount Lemmon Survey	THM	2.0 km	MPC · JPL
364518	2007 EJ_{148}	—	March 12, 2007	Mount Lemmon	Mount Lemmon Survey	·	2.2 km	MPC · JPL
364519	2007 EE_{151}	—	March 12, 2007	Mount Lemmon	Mount Lemmon Survey	·	2.4 km	MPC · JPL
364520	2007 EP_{152}	—	March 12, 2007	Mount Lemmon	Mount Lemmon Survey	HYG	4.5 km	MPC · JPL
364521	2007 EQ_{168}	—	March 13, 2007	Kitt Peak	Spacewatch	·	4.0 km	MPC · JPL
364522	2007 EX_{168}	—	March 13, 2007	Kitt Peak	Spacewatch	EOS	1.9 km	MPC · JPL
364523	2007 EQ_{180}	—	March 14, 2007	Mount Lemmon	Mount Lemmon Survey	·	4.0 km	MPC · JPL
364524	2007 EW_{181}	—	March 14, 2007	Kitt Peak	Spacewatch	·	3.2 km	MPC · JPL
364525	2007 EC_{188}	—	February 25, 2007	Mount Lemmon	Mount Lemmon Survey	·	2.7 km	MPC · JPL
364526	2007 EW_{199}	—	February 21, 2007	Kitt Peak	Spacewatch	·	3.1 km	MPC · JPL
364527	2007 EJ_{201}	—	March 9, 2007	Siding Spring	SSS	H	820 m	MPC · JPL
364528	2007 EP_{205}	—	February 22, 2007	Catalina	CSS	·	2.7 km	MPC · JPL
364529	2007 EL_{213}	—	March 10, 2007	Kitt Peak	Spacewatch	·	2.1 km	MPC · JPL
364530	2007 EU_{216}	—	March 15, 2007	Catalina	CSS	T_{j} (2.98)	4.0 km	MPC · JPL
364531	2007 FU_{2}	—	May 9, 2002	Socorro	LINEAR	·	3.9 km	MPC · JPL
364532	2007 FP_{22}	—	March 20, 2007	Kitt Peak	Spacewatch	·	2.8 km	MPC · JPL
364533	2007 FH_{24}	—	March 20, 2007	Kitt Peak	Spacewatch	(1298)	3.1 km	MPC · JPL
364534	2007 FD_{26}	—	March 20, 2007	Mount Lemmon	Mount Lemmon Survey	·	1.8 km	MPC · JPL
364535	2007 FW_{26}	—	March 20, 2007	Kitt Peak	Spacewatch	·	1.6 km	MPC · JPL
364536	2007 FV_{27}	—	February 23, 2007	Kitt Peak	Spacewatch	·	2.3 km	MPC · JPL
364537	2007 FV_{31}	—	March 20, 2007	Kitt Peak	Spacewatch	VER	2.8 km	MPC · JPL
364538	2007 FR_{42}	—	March 20, 2007	Anderson Mesa	LONEOS	T_{j} (2.9)	3.6 km	MPC · JPL
364539	2007 FG_{43}	—	March 27, 2007	Siding Spring	SSS	·	5.0 km	MPC · JPL
364540	2007 FD_{50}	—	March 25, 2007	Mount Lemmon	Mount Lemmon Survey	·	4.1 km	MPC · JPL
364541	2007 FJ_{50}	—	March 25, 2007	Mount Lemmon	Mount Lemmon Survey	EOS	2.8 km	MPC · JPL
364542	2007 GF_{1}	—	February 16, 2007	Mount Lemmon	Mount Lemmon Survey	EOS	2.0 km	MPC · JPL
364543	2007 GX_{2}	—	April 7, 2007	Mount Lemmon	Mount Lemmon Survey	EOS	2.2 km	MPC · JPL
364544	2007 GL_{6}	—	April 11, 2007	7300	W. K. Y. Yeung	·	3.1 km	MPC · JPL
364545	2007 GK_{7}	—	April 7, 2007	Mount Lemmon	Mount Lemmon Survey	EMA	4.2 km	MPC · JPL
364546	2007 GC_{12}	—	April 11, 2007	Kitt Peak	Spacewatch	EOS	2.2 km	MPC · JPL
364547	2007 GX_{18}	—	April 11, 2007	Kitt Peak	Spacewatch	EOS	2.4 km	MPC · JPL
364548	2007 GN_{21}	—	April 11, 2007	Mount Lemmon	Mount Lemmon Survey	EUP	4.2 km	MPC · JPL
364549	2007 GJ_{26}	—	April 14, 2007	Mount Lemmon	Mount Lemmon Survey	·	2.7 km	MPC · JPL
364550	2007 GY_{31}	—	March 20, 2007	Catalina	CSS	·	3.2 km	MPC · JPL
364551	2007 GB_{32}	—	March 9, 2007	Kitt Peak	Spacewatch	·	3.5 km	MPC · JPL
364552	2007 GO_{35}	—	April 14, 2007	Kitt Peak	Spacewatch	·	3.1 km	MPC · JPL
364553	2007 GR_{56}	—	April 15, 2007	Kitt Peak	Spacewatch	·	3.4 km	MPC · JPL
364554	2007 GT_{58}	—	April 15, 2007	Mount Lemmon	Mount Lemmon Survey	HYG	2.8 km	MPC · JPL
364555	2007 GA_{75}	—	April 14, 2007	Catalina	CSS	·	4.0 km	MPC · JPL
364556	2007 GF_{76}	—	March 13, 2007	Kitt Peak	Spacewatch	HYG	2.3 km	MPC · JPL
364557	2007 GG_{76}	—	April 7, 2007	Mount Lemmon	Mount Lemmon Survey	THM	2.2 km	MPC · JPL
364558	2007 HH_{12}	—	April 19, 2007	Mount Lemmon	Mount Lemmon Survey	·	2.9 km	MPC · JPL
364559	2007 HT_{16}	—	April 16, 2007	Mount Lemmon	Mount Lemmon Survey	HYG	3.1 km	MPC · JPL
364560	2007 HQ_{17}	—	April 16, 2007	Socorro	LINEAR	T_{j} (2.98)	7.0 km	MPC · JPL
364561	2007 HE_{30}	—	April 19, 2007	Mount Lemmon	Mount Lemmon Survey	·	3.6 km	MPC · JPL
364562	2007 HL_{62}	—	March 14, 2007	Mount Lemmon	Mount Lemmon Survey	VER	2.8 km	MPC · JPL
364563	2007 JL_{19}	—	May 10, 2007	Mount Lemmon	Mount Lemmon Survey	·	3.4 km	MPC · JPL
364564	2007 JJ_{42}	—	May 10, 2007	Catalina	CSS	·	3.7 km	MPC · JPL
364565	2007 KK_{7}	—	May 16, 2007	Catalina	CSS	T_{j} (2.98)	4.4 km	MPC · JPL
364566 Yurga	2007 PM_{8}	Yurga	August 10, 2007	Nauchnyj	Rumyantsev, V.	·	590 m	MPC · JPL
364567	2007 PB_{13}	—	August 8, 2007	Socorro	LINEAR	·	890 m	MPC · JPL
364568	2007 PU_{17}	—	August 9, 2007	Socorro	LINEAR	·	980 m	MPC · JPL
364569	2007 QJ_{5}	—	August 16, 2007	Purple Mountain	PMO NEO Survey Program	·	770 m	MPC · JPL
364570	2007 QL_{5}	—	August 16, 2007	Purple Mountain	PMO NEO Survey Program	·	720 m	MPC · JPL
364571	2007 RH_{10}	—	September 3, 2007	Catalina	CSS	·	810 m	MPC · JPL
364572	2007 RS_{11}	—	September 10, 2007	Dauban	Chante-Perdrix	·	840 m	MPC · JPL
364573	2007 RT_{22}	—	September 3, 2007	Catalina	CSS	EUN	890 m	MPC · JPL
364574	2007 RL_{27}	—	September 4, 2007	Mount Lemmon	Mount Lemmon Survey	·	650 m	MPC · JPL
364575	2007 RK_{29}	—	September 4, 2007	Catalina	CSS	·	930 m	MPC · JPL
364576	2007 RN_{32}	—	September 5, 2007	Catalina	CSS	·	1.1 km	MPC · JPL
364577 Cachopito	2007 RC_{35}	Cachopito	September 7, 2007	La Cañada	Lacruz, J.	·	1.2 km	MPC · JPL
364578	2007 RG_{37}	—	September 8, 2007	Anderson Mesa	LONEOS	·	1.1 km	MPC · JPL
364579	2007 RW_{52}	—	September 9, 2007	Kitt Peak	Spacewatch	·	760 m	MPC · JPL
364580	2007 RB_{54}	—	September 9, 2007	Kitt Peak	Spacewatch	V	590 m	MPC · JPL
364581	2007 RM_{70}	—	September 10, 2007	Kitt Peak	Spacewatch	·	890 m	MPC · JPL
364582	2007 RP_{103}	—	September 11, 2007	Catalina	CSS	·	1.3 km	MPC · JPL
364583	2007 RU_{103}	—	September 11, 2007	Catalina	CSS	·	730 m	MPC · JPL
364584	2007 RL_{116}	—	September 11, 2007	Kitt Peak	Spacewatch	·	900 m	MPC · JPL
364585	2007 RF_{118}	—	September 11, 2007	Kitt Peak	Spacewatch	·	790 m	MPC · JPL
364586	2007 RG_{119}	—	September 11, 2007	Purple Mountain	PMO NEO Survey Program	·	690 m	MPC · JPL
364587	2007 RJ_{119}	—	September 11, 2007	Purple Mountain	PMO NEO Survey Program	·	810 m	MPC · JPL
364588	2007 RG_{124}	—	September 12, 2007	Anderson Mesa	LONEOS	·	1.2 km	MPC · JPL
364589	2007 RZ_{134}	—	September 12, 2007	Catalina	CSS	·	1.1 km	MPC · JPL
364590	2007 RO_{141}	—	September 13, 2007	Socorro	LINEAR	·	850 m	MPC · JPL
364591	2007 RK_{144}	—	September 14, 2007	Socorro	LINEAR	·	800 m	MPC · JPL
364592	2007 RA_{145}	—	September 11, 2007	Kitt Peak	Spacewatch	·	730 m	MPC · JPL
364593	2007 RT_{145}	—	September 9, 2007	Kitt Peak	Spacewatch	·	800 m	MPC · JPL
364594	2007 RF_{155}	—	August 10, 2007	Kitt Peak	Spacewatch	·	520 m	MPC · JPL
364595	2007 RX_{173}	—	September 10, 2007	Kitt Peak	Spacewatch	·	1.3 km	MPC · JPL
364596	2007 RO_{177}	—	September 10, 2007	Mount Lemmon	Mount Lemmon Survey	·	600 m	MPC · JPL
364597	2007 RC_{178}	—	September 10, 2007	Kitt Peak	Spacewatch	V	640 m	MPC · JPL
364598	2007 RB_{190}	—	December 15, 2004	Kitt Peak	Spacewatch	V	630 m	MPC · JPL
364599	2007 RT_{195}	—	September 12, 2007	Kitt Peak	Spacewatch	·	1.0 km	MPC · JPL
364600	2007 RG_{203}	—	September 13, 2007	Kitt Peak	Spacewatch	·	1.5 km	MPC · JPL

== 364601–364700 ==
back to top

Designation			Discovery			Properties		Ref
Permanent	Provisional	Named after	Date	Site	Discoverer(s)	Category	Diam.	Ref
364601	2007 RL_{206}	—	September 10, 2007	Mount Lemmon	Mount Lemmon Survey	·	740 m	MPC · JPL
364602	2007 RW_{212}	—	September 12, 2007	Anderson Mesa	LONEOS	·	740 m	MPC · JPL
364603	2007 RW_{223}	—	September 10, 2007	Kitt Peak	Spacewatch	·	700 m	MPC · JPL
364604	2007 RC_{236}	—	September 13, 2007	Mount Lemmon	Mount Lemmon Survey	·	770 m	MPC · JPL
364605	2007 RX_{249}	—	September 13, 2007	Kitt Peak	Spacewatch	·	850 m	MPC · JPL
364606	2007 RC_{259}	—	September 14, 2007	Mount Lemmon	Mount Lemmon Survey	·	770 m	MPC · JPL
364607	2007 RJ_{267}	—	September 15, 2007	Kitt Peak	Spacewatch	·	710 m	MPC · JPL
364608	2007 RH_{272}	—	September 15, 2007	Kitt Peak	Spacewatch	·	860 m	MPC · JPL
364609	2007 RT_{273}	—	September 15, 2007	Kitt Peak	Spacewatch	·	710 m	MPC · JPL
364610	2007 RJ_{289}	—	September 12, 2007	Catalina	CSS	·	970 m	MPC · JPL
364611	2007 RT_{293}	—	September 13, 2007	Mount Lemmon	Mount Lemmon Survey	V	680 m	MPC · JPL
364612	2007 RN_{295}	—	September 14, 2007	Mount Lemmon	Mount Lemmon Survey	·	1.3 km	MPC · JPL
364613	2007 RX_{319}	—	September 13, 2007	Mount Lemmon	Mount Lemmon Survey	·	1.1 km	MPC · JPL
364614	2007 RA_{323}	—	September 14, 2007	Mount Lemmon	Mount Lemmon Survey	EUN	1.0 km	MPC · JPL
364615	2007 RL_{325}	—	September 15, 2007	Mount Lemmon	Mount Lemmon Survey	·	1.1 km	MPC · JPL
364616	2007 SO_{4}	—	September 19, 2007	Costitx	OAM	·	800 m	MPC · JPL
364617	2007 SB_{6}	—	September 15, 2007	Kitt Peak	Spacewatch	·	580 m	MPC · JPL
364618	2007 ST_{15}	—	September 30, 2007	Kitt Peak	Spacewatch	·	1.3 km	MPC · JPL
364619	2007 SO_{21}	—	September 21, 2007	XuYi	PMO NEO Survey Program	·	820 m	MPC · JPL
364620	2007 TO_{1}	—	October 2, 2007	Lulin	LUSS	V	730 m	MPC · JPL
364621	2007 TT_{10}	—	October 6, 2007	Socorro	LINEAR	·	1.0 km	MPC · JPL
364622	2007 TO_{12}	—	October 6, 2007	Socorro	LINEAR	·	1.3 km	MPC · JPL
364623	2007 TH_{14}	—	October 7, 2007	7300	W. K. Y. Yeung	·	880 m	MPC · JPL
364624	2007 TZ_{15}	—	September 14, 2007	Mount Lemmon	Mount Lemmon Survey	·	690 m	MPC · JPL
364625	2007 TE_{24}	—	October 4, 2007	Goodricke-Pigott	R. A. Tucker	·	1.1 km	MPC · JPL
364626	2007 TU_{33}	—	October 6, 2007	Kitt Peak	Spacewatch	·	1.2 km	MPC · JPL
364627	2007 TK_{35}	—	October 7, 2007	Catalina	CSS	·	1.2 km	MPC · JPL
364628	2007 TX_{54}	—	September 25, 2007	Mount Lemmon	Mount Lemmon Survey	·	750 m	MPC · JPL
364629	2007 TC_{68}	—	October 10, 2007	Catalina	CSS	·	1.6 km	MPC · JPL
364630 Shizuoka	2007 TS_{70}	Shizuoka	October 13, 2007	Charleston	R. Holmes	·	1.1 km	MPC · JPL
364631	2007 TA_{82}	—	October 8, 2007	Mount Lemmon	Mount Lemmon Survey	·	640 m	MPC · JPL
364632	2007 TM_{85}	—	October 8, 2007	Catalina	CSS	·	1.2 km	MPC · JPL
364633	2007 TJ_{89}	—	October 8, 2007	Mount Lemmon	Mount Lemmon Survey	·	760 m	MPC · JPL
364634	2007 TJ_{94}	—	October 7, 2007	Catalina	CSS	·	930 m	MPC · JPL
364635	2007 TZ_{103}	—	October 8, 2007	Mount Lemmon	Mount Lemmon Survey	·	1.4 km	MPC · JPL
364636 Ulrikeecker	2007 TR_{105}	Ulrikeecker	October 15, 2007	Redshed	Bachleitner, H.	·	800 m	MPC · JPL
364637	2007 TN_{106}	—	October 4, 2007	Kitt Peak	Spacewatch	·	1.8 km	MPC · JPL
364638	2007 TT_{106}	—	October 4, 2007	Kitt Peak	Spacewatch	·	1.4 km	MPC · JPL
364639	2007 TY_{109}	—	October 7, 2007	Catalina	CSS	·	860 m	MPC · JPL
364640	2007 TU_{111}	—	October 8, 2007	Catalina	CSS	V	870 m	MPC · JPL
364641	2007 TD_{112}	—	October 8, 2007	Catalina	CSS	·	870 m	MPC · JPL
364642	2007 TC_{121}	—	October 5, 2007	Kitt Peak	Spacewatch	·	600 m	MPC · JPL
364643	2007 TX_{134}	—	October 8, 2007	Kitt Peak	Spacewatch	·	1.3 km	MPC · JPL
364644	2007 TR_{144}	—	October 6, 2007	Socorro	LINEAR	·	920 m	MPC · JPL
364645	2007 TV_{145}	—	October 6, 2007	Socorro	LINEAR	·	900 m	MPC · JPL
364646	2007 TY_{148}	—	October 8, 2007	Socorro	LINEAR	MAS	650 m	MPC · JPL
364647	2007 TT_{150}	—	October 9, 2007	Socorro	LINEAR	·	1.1 km	MPC · JPL
364648	2007 TQ_{152}	—	October 9, 2007	Socorro	LINEAR	·	1.6 km	MPC · JPL
364649	2007 TO_{153}	—	October 10, 2007	Mount Lemmon	Mount Lemmon Survey	NYS	1.3 km	MPC · JPL
364650	2007 TY_{159}	—	October 8, 2007	Catalina	CSS	PHO	1.1 km	MPC · JPL
364651	2007 TR_{161}	—	October 11, 2007	Socorro	LINEAR	·	1.4 km	MPC · JPL
364652	2007 TY_{161}	—	October 11, 2007	Socorro	LINEAR	NYS	1.1 km	MPC · JPL
364653	2007 TL_{163}	—	October 11, 2007	Socorro	LINEAR	·	1.4 km	MPC · JPL
364654	2007 TY_{169}	—	October 12, 2007	Socorro	LINEAR	·	1.6 km	MPC · JPL
364655	2007 TT_{171}	—	October 9, 2007	Mount Lemmon	Mount Lemmon Survey	MAS	900 m	MPC · JPL
364656	2007 TD_{183}	—	September 5, 2007	Mount Lemmon	Mount Lemmon Survey	·	1.2 km	MPC · JPL
364657	2007 TN_{185}	—	October 13, 2007	Socorro	LINEAR	·	750 m	MPC · JPL
364658	2007 TZ_{193}	—	October 7, 2007	Catalina	CSS	·	670 m	MPC · JPL
364659	2007 TZ_{195}	—	October 7, 2007	Mount Lemmon	Mount Lemmon Survey	·	660 m	MPC · JPL
364660	2007 TS_{209}	—	October 11, 2007	Mount Lemmon	Mount Lemmon Survey	·	790 m	MPC · JPL
364661	2007 TY_{239}	—	October 13, 2007	Socorro	LINEAR	·	740 m	MPC · JPL
364662	2007 TS_{259}	—	October 10, 2007	Mount Lemmon	Mount Lemmon Survey	·	470 m	MPC · JPL
364663	2007 TH_{279}	—	October 11, 2007	Mount Lemmon	Mount Lemmon Survey	·	1.1 km	MPC · JPL
364664	2007 TL_{285}	—	September 12, 2007	Mount Lemmon	Mount Lemmon Survey	·	690 m	MPC · JPL
364665	2007 TC_{289}	—	October 11, 2007	Catalina	CSS	·	1.5 km	MPC · JPL
364666	2007 TV_{293}	—	October 9, 2007	Mount Lemmon	Mount Lemmon Survey	·	2.4 km	MPC · JPL
364667	2007 TA_{298}	—	October 11, 2007	Mount Lemmon	Mount Lemmon Survey	·	1.2 km	MPC · JPL
364668	2007 TX_{311}	—	October 11, 2007	Mount Lemmon	Mount Lemmon Survey	·	1.0 km	MPC · JPL
364669	2007 TT_{316}	—	October 12, 2007	Kitt Peak	Spacewatch	·	1.4 km	MPC · JPL
364670	2007 TW_{337}	—	October 13, 2007	Catalina	CSS	·	700 m	MPC · JPL
364671	2007 TD_{350}	—	October 14, 2007	Mount Lemmon	Mount Lemmon Survey	·	860 m	MPC · JPL
364672	2007 TQ_{354}	—	October 10, 2007	Kitt Peak	Spacewatch	V	810 m	MPC · JPL
364673	2007 TO_{358}	—	October 14, 2007	Mount Lemmon	Mount Lemmon Survey	PHO	1.0 km	MPC · JPL
364674	2007 TU_{359}	—	October 14, 2007	Kitt Peak	Spacewatch	·	800 m	MPC · JPL
364675	2007 TV_{359}	—	October 14, 2007	Kitt Peak	Spacewatch	·	970 m	MPC · JPL
364676	2007 TM_{361}	—	October 14, 2007	Mount Lemmon	Mount Lemmon Survey	·	1.3 km	MPC · JPL
364677	2007 TT_{361}	—	October 14, 2007	Mount Lemmon	Mount Lemmon Survey	·	1.5 km	MPC · JPL
364678	2007 TD_{364}	—	October 15, 2007	Mount Lemmon	Mount Lemmon Survey	·	1.7 km	MPC · JPL
364679	2007 TM_{364}	—	October 15, 2007	Catalina	CSS	·	730 m	MPC · JPL
364680	2007 TY_{366}	—	October 9, 2007	Kitt Peak	Spacewatch	·	880 m	MPC · JPL
364681	2007 TA_{372}	—	October 13, 2007	Catalina	CSS	·	1.1 km	MPC · JPL
364682	2007 TN_{376}	—	October 10, 2007	Catalina	CSS	·	1.9 km	MPC · JPL
364683	2007 TW_{376}	—	September 12, 2007	Catalina	CSS	·	920 m	MPC · JPL
364684	2007 TP_{386}	—	October 15, 2007	Kitt Peak	Spacewatch	·	1.4 km	MPC · JPL
364685	2007 TB_{412}	—	October 14, 2007	Catalina	CSS	·	890 m	MPC · JPL
364686	2007 TD_{424}	—	October 7, 2007	Catalina	CSS	·	1.4 km	MPC · JPL
364687	2007 TK_{424}	—	October 7, 2007	Kitt Peak	Spacewatch	·	1.2 km	MPC · JPL
364688	2007 TU_{447}	—	October 13, 2007	Mount Lemmon	Mount Lemmon Survey	·	740 m	MPC · JPL
364689	2007 TV_{450}	—	September 30, 2003	Kitt Peak	Spacewatch	·	1.3 km	MPC · JPL
364690	2007 UE_{2}	—	October 18, 2007	Mayhill	Lowe, A.	·	960 m	MPC · JPL
364691	2007 UB_{4}	—	October 18, 2007	Socorro	LINEAR	·	890 m	MPC · JPL
364692	2007 UH_{25}	—	October 16, 2007	Kitt Peak	Spacewatch	·	770 m	MPC · JPL
364693	2007 UQ_{30}	—	October 4, 2007	XuYi	PMO NEO Survey Program	T_{j} (2.98) · 3:2	6.6 km	MPC · JPL
364694	2007 UX_{34}	—	October 19, 2007	Kitt Peak	Spacewatch	·	810 m	MPC · JPL
364695	2007 UV_{48}	—	October 20, 2007	Mount Lemmon	Mount Lemmon Survey	·	670 m	MPC · JPL
364696	2007 UY_{48}	—	October 20, 2007	Mount Lemmon	Mount Lemmon Survey	·	1.5 km	MPC · JPL
364697	2007 US_{49}	—	October 24, 2007	Mount Lemmon	Mount Lemmon Survey	V	750 m	MPC · JPL
364698	2007 UV_{51}	—	October 24, 2007	Mount Lemmon	Mount Lemmon Survey	PHO	1.0 km	MPC · JPL
364699	2007 UO_{60}	—	October 30, 2007	Mount Lemmon	Mount Lemmon Survey	V	900 m	MPC · JPL
364700	2007 UU_{60}	—	October 30, 2007	Mount Lemmon	Mount Lemmon Survey	·	930 m	MPC · JPL

== 364701–364800 ==
back to top

Designation			Discovery			Properties		Ref
Permanent	Provisional	Named after	Date	Site	Discoverer(s)	Category	Diam.	Ref
364701	2007 UR_{67}	—	October 30, 2007	Mount Lemmon	Mount Lemmon Survey	·	780 m	MPC · JPL
364702	2007 UQ_{89}	—	October 30, 2007	Catalina	CSS	·	1.1 km	MPC · JPL
364703	2007 UQ_{105}	—	October 20, 2007	Mount Lemmon	Mount Lemmon Survey	(5)	880 m	MPC · JPL
364704	2007 UZ_{107}	—	October 30, 2007	Kitt Peak	Spacewatch	·	580 m	MPC · JPL
364705	2007 UX_{110}	—	October 30, 2007	Mount Lemmon	Mount Lemmon Survey	·	870 m	MPC · JPL
364706	2007 US_{111}	—	October 30, 2007	Mount Lemmon	Mount Lemmon Survey	·	900 m	MPC · JPL
364707	2007 UM_{122}	—	October 30, 2007	Kitt Peak	Spacewatch	·	1.1 km	MPC · JPL
364708	2007 UH_{131}	—	October 16, 2007	Catalina	CSS	·	730 m	MPC · JPL
364709	2007 UP_{137}	—	September 12, 2007	Mount Lemmon	Mount Lemmon Survey	·	1.6 km	MPC · JPL
364710	2007 VU_{7}	—	November 3, 2007	Kitami	K. Endate	·	1.2 km	MPC · JPL
364711	2007 VL_{36}	—	October 12, 2007	Kitt Peak	Spacewatch	·	1.2 km	MPC · JPL
364712	2007 VG_{44}	—	November 1, 2007	Kitt Peak	Spacewatch	·	830 m	MPC · JPL
364713	2007 VH_{45}	—	October 9, 2007	Kitt Peak	Spacewatch	·	930 m	MPC · JPL
364714	2007 VU_{45}	—	November 1, 2007	Kitt Peak	Spacewatch	·	710 m	MPC · JPL
364715	2007 VX_{52}	—	October 20, 2007	Mount Lemmon	Mount Lemmon Survey	PHO	1.1 km	MPC · JPL
364716	2007 VM_{53}	—	April 1, 2005	Kitt Peak	Spacewatch	·	1.0 km	MPC · JPL
364717	2007 VF_{61}	—	November 1, 2007	Kitt Peak	Spacewatch	·	1.0 km	MPC · JPL
364718	2007 VP_{61}	—	November 1, 2007	Kitt Peak	Spacewatch	·	1.1 km	MPC · JPL
364719	2007 VD_{72}	—	November 1, 2007	Kitt Peak	Spacewatch	·	990 m	MPC · JPL
364720	2007 VH_{73}	—	November 2, 2007	Kitt Peak	Spacewatch	V	810 m	MPC · JPL
364721	2007 VM_{73}	—	November 2, 2007	Kitt Peak	Spacewatch	·	2.4 km	MPC · JPL
364722	2007 VX_{77}	—	November 3, 2007	Kitt Peak	Spacewatch	·	1.2 km	MPC · JPL
364723	2007 VD_{82}	—	November 4, 2007	Kitt Peak	Spacewatch	MAS	680 m	MPC · JPL
364724	2007 VE_{89}	—	October 10, 2007	Mount Lemmon	Mount Lemmon Survey	·	1.3 km	MPC · JPL
364725	2007 VG_{95}	—	November 8, 2007	Socorro	LINEAR	·	1.6 km	MPC · JPL
364726	2007 VF_{102}	—	November 2, 2007	Kitt Peak	Spacewatch	·	1.0 km	MPC · JPL
364727	2007 VJ_{104}	—	October 21, 2007	Mount Lemmon	Mount Lemmon Survey	·	1.7 km	MPC · JPL
364728	2007 VG_{109}	—	November 3, 2007	Kitt Peak	Spacewatch	·	1.1 km	MPC · JPL
364729	2007 VH_{111}	—	November 3, 2007	Kitt Peak	Spacewatch	·	1.5 km	MPC · JPL
364730	2007 VJ_{113}	—	November 3, 2007	Kitt Peak	Spacewatch	V	790 m	MPC · JPL
364731	2007 VY_{119}	—	September 18, 2007	Goodricke-Pigott	R. A. Tucker	·	770 m	MPC · JPL
364732	2007 VX_{142}	—	October 15, 2007	Mount Lemmon	Mount Lemmon Survey	·	1.0 km	MPC · JPL
364733	2007 VS_{148}	—	November 5, 2007	Purple Mountain	PMO NEO Survey Program	MAS	840 m	MPC · JPL
364734	2007 VT_{148}	—	November 5, 2007	Purple Mountain	PMO NEO Survey Program	·	1.4 km	MPC · JPL
364735	2007 VS_{167}	—	November 5, 2007	Kitt Peak	Spacewatch	·	1.2 km	MPC · JPL
364736	2007 VX_{196}	—	November 7, 2007	Mount Lemmon	Mount Lemmon Survey	V	760 m	MPC · JPL
364737	2007 VV_{212}	—	November 9, 2007	Kitt Peak	Spacewatch	·	640 m	MPC · JPL
364738	2007 VK_{214}	—	November 9, 2007	Kitt Peak	Spacewatch	·	1.7 km	MPC · JPL
364739	2007 VQ_{218}	—	November 9, 2007	Kitt Peak	Spacewatch	·	1.2 km	MPC · JPL
364740	2007 VC_{226}	—	November 9, 2007	Mount Lemmon	Mount Lemmon Survey	·	610 m	MPC · JPL
364741	2007 VD_{248}	—	November 13, 2007	Mount Lemmon	Mount Lemmon Survey	V	690 m	MPC · JPL
364742	2007 VL_{252}	—	October 31, 2007	Catalina	CSS	V	780 m	MPC · JPL
364743	2007 VD_{267}	—	November 13, 2007	Catalina	CSS	PHO	1.3 km	MPC · JPL
364744	2007 VB_{268}	—	November 11, 2007	Socorro	LINEAR	V	780 m	MPC · JPL
364745	2007 VL_{268}	—	November 12, 2007	Socorro	LINEAR	·	650 m	MPC · JPL
364746	2007 VJ_{269}	—	November 14, 2007	Socorro	LINEAR	·	1.7 km	MPC · JPL
364747	2007 VB_{275}	—	November 13, 2007	Mount Lemmon	Mount Lemmon Survey	V	690 m	MPC · JPL
364748	2007 VM_{289}	—	November 13, 2007	Catalina	CSS	·	1.3 km	MPC · JPL
364749	2007 VC_{294}	—	November 13, 2007	Kitt Peak	Spacewatch	·	1.1 km	MPC · JPL
364750	2007 VP_{296}	—	November 15, 2007	Catalina	CSS	·	1.4 km	MPC · JPL
364751	2007 VC_{307}	—	November 2, 2007	Kitt Peak	Spacewatch	·	1.6 km	MPC · JPL
364752	2007 VT_{313}	—	November 11, 2007	Mount Lemmon	Mount Lemmon Survey	·	1.4 km	MPC · JPL
364753	2007 VK_{327}	—	November 19, 2007	Kitt Peak	Spacewatch	·	1.2 km	MPC · JPL
364754	2007 VH_{329}	—	November 19, 2007	Kitt Peak	Spacewatch	·	1.1 km	MPC · JPL
364755	2007 VA_{334}	—	November 12, 2007	Mount Lemmon	Mount Lemmon Survey	·	1.3 km	MPC · JPL
364756	2007 WG_{1}	—	November 16, 2007	Dauban	Chante-Perdrix	MAS	630 m	MPC · JPL
364757	2007 WA_{8}	—	November 8, 2007	Kitt Peak	Spacewatch	·	1.8 km	MPC · JPL
364758	2007 WL_{18}	—	November 18, 2007	Mount Lemmon	Mount Lemmon Survey	V	690 m	MPC · JPL
364759	2007 WG_{20}	—	November 18, 2007	Mount Lemmon	Mount Lemmon Survey	·	1.4 km	MPC · JPL
364760	2007 WQ_{20}	—	November 18, 2007	Mount Lemmon	Mount Lemmon Survey	·	1.8 km	MPC · JPL
364761	2007 WH_{62}	—	November 18, 2007	Socorro	LINEAR	·	1.1 km	MPC · JPL
364762	2007 XC_{10}	—	December 5, 2007	Mount Lemmon	Mount Lemmon Survey	AMO +1km	1.0 km	MPC · JPL
364763	2007 XZ_{16}	—	December 4, 2007	Catalina	CSS	·	1.1 km	MPC · JPL
364764	2007 XO_{21}	—	December 10, 2007	Socorro	LINEAR	·	1.0 km	MPC · JPL
364765	2007 XS_{21}	—	December 10, 2007	Socorro	LINEAR	NYS	1.3 km	MPC · JPL
364766	2007 XP_{29}	—	October 30, 2007	Kitt Peak	Spacewatch	(2076)	990 m	MPC · JPL
364767	2007 XY_{30}	—	November 11, 2007	Mount Lemmon	Mount Lemmon Survey	·	1.5 km	MPC · JPL
364768	2007 XC_{47}	—	December 15, 2007	Mount Lemmon	Mount Lemmon Survey	V	700 m	MPC · JPL
364769	2007 XR_{51}	—	December 4, 2007	Mount Lemmon	Mount Lemmon Survey	·	1.2 km	MPC · JPL
364770	2007 XS_{57}	—	December 4, 2007	Socorro	LINEAR	·	2.6 km	MPC · JPL
364771	2007 XZ_{57}	—	December 5, 2007	Kitt Peak	Spacewatch	·	1.5 km	MPC · JPL
364772	2007 XF_{58}	—	December 5, 2007	Kitt Peak	Spacewatch	·	1.6 km	MPC · JPL
364773	2007 YT	—	December 16, 2007	Bergisch Gladbach	W. Bickel	·	1.5 km	MPC · JPL
364774	2007 YK_{28}	—	December 18, 2007	Mount Lemmon	Mount Lemmon Survey	·	1.9 km	MPC · JPL
364775	2007 YF_{37}	—	December 30, 2007	Mount Lemmon	Mount Lemmon Survey	·	1.4 km	MPC · JPL
364776	2007 YF_{53}	—	December 30, 2007	Kitt Peak	Spacewatch	·	1.5 km	MPC · JPL
364777	2007 YS_{54}	—	December 31, 2007	Catalina	CSS	BRG	1.9 km	MPC · JPL
364778	2007 YF_{67}	—	December 18, 2007	Mount Lemmon	Mount Lemmon Survey	·	1.4 km	MPC · JPL
364779	2007 YT_{69}	—	December 30, 2007	Mount Lemmon	Mount Lemmon Survey	MAS	900 m	MPC · JPL
364780	2007 YL_{71}	—	December 16, 2007	Mount Lemmon	Mount Lemmon Survey	·	2.9 km	MPC · JPL
364781	2008 AB_{3}	—	January 7, 2008	Lulin	LUSS	·	1.4 km	MPC · JPL
364782	2008 AE_{3}	—	November 8, 2007	Mount Lemmon	Mount Lemmon Survey	(5)	1.4 km	MPC · JPL
364783	2008 AJ_{5}	—	January 9, 2008	Lulin	LUSS	·	1.8 km	MPC · JPL
364784	2008 AS_{6}	—	January 10, 2008	Mount Lemmon	Mount Lemmon Survey	V	810 m	MPC · JPL
364785	2008 AR_{19}	—	January 10, 2008	Mount Lemmon	Mount Lemmon Survey	(5)	1.4 km	MPC · JPL
364786	2008 AS_{30}	—	January 10, 2008	Desert Eagle	W. K. Y. Yeung	·	1.3 km	MPC · JPL
364787	2008 AY_{32}	—	December 15, 2007	Catalina	CSS	·	1.3 km	MPC · JPL
364788	2008 AW_{44}	—	January 10, 2008	Kitt Peak	Spacewatch	AEO	1.0 km	MPC · JPL
364789	2008 AM_{69}	—	October 19, 2007	Mount Lemmon	Mount Lemmon Survey	·	1.7 km	MPC · JPL
364790	2008 AD_{71}	—	November 21, 2007	Mount Lemmon	Mount Lemmon Survey	·	1.6 km	MPC · JPL
364791	2008 AC_{74}	—	January 10, 2008	Catalina	CSS	·	3.3 km	MPC · JPL
364792	2008 AV_{78}	—	January 12, 2008	Kitt Peak	Spacewatch	·	1.3 km	MPC · JPL
364793	2008 AH_{81}	—	January 12, 2008	Kitt Peak	Spacewatch	·	1.7 km	MPC · JPL
364794	2008 AX_{89}	—	January 13, 2008	Kitt Peak	Spacewatch	NYS	1.4 km	MPC · JPL
364795	2008 AK_{92}	—	January 14, 2008	Kitt Peak	Spacewatch	·	1.1 km	MPC · JPL
364796	2008 AD_{99}	—	December 31, 2007	Kitt Peak	Spacewatch	·	1.3 km	MPC · JPL
364797	2008 AC_{100}	—	January 14, 2008	Kitt Peak	Spacewatch	·	1.6 km	MPC · JPL
364798	2008 AJ_{100}	—	January 14, 2008	Kitt Peak	Spacewatch	·	1.7 km	MPC · JPL
364799	2008 AE_{107}	—	January 15, 2008	Kitt Peak	Spacewatch	·	1.3 km	MPC · JPL
364800	2008 AX_{115}	—	January 11, 2008	Kitt Peak	Spacewatch	·	1.3 km	MPC · JPL

== 364801–364900 ==
back to top

Designation			Discovery			Properties		Ref
Permanent	Provisional	Named after	Date	Site	Discoverer(s)	Category	Diam.	Ref
364801	2008 AL_{129}	—	January 11, 2008	Kitt Peak	Spacewatch	·	1.2 km	MPC · JPL
364802	2008 AN_{134}	—	January 3, 2008	Lulin	LUSS	·	1.3 km	MPC · JPL
364803	2008 AB_{136}	—	January 11, 2008	Mount Lemmon	Mount Lemmon Survey	·	2.1 km	MPC · JPL
364804	2008 AC_{136}	—	January 12, 2008	Catalina	CSS	(1547)	1.6 km	MPC · JPL
364805	2008 BH_{6}	—	January 16, 2008	Kitt Peak	Spacewatch	ADE	2.0 km	MPC · JPL
364806	2008 BL_{10}	—	June 30, 2005	Kitt Peak	Spacewatch	·	2.3 km	MPC · JPL
364807	2008 BC_{13}	—	January 19, 2008	Mount Lemmon	Mount Lemmon Survey	·	1.8 km	MPC · JPL
364808	2008 BC_{16}	—	January 28, 2008	Lulin	LUSS	(5)	1.6 km	MPC · JPL
364809	2008 BZ_{17}	—	January 30, 2008	Catalina	CSS	·	2.8 km	MPC · JPL
364810	2008 BG_{18}	—	January 30, 2008	Mount Lemmon	Mount Lemmon Survey	EUP	4.7 km	MPC · JPL
364811	2008 BL_{19}	—	January 30, 2008	Kitt Peak	Spacewatch	·	1.6 km	MPC · JPL
364812	2008 BS_{25}	—	January 30, 2008	Catalina	CSS	·	1.7 km	MPC · JPL
364813	2008 BL_{36}	—	January 30, 2008	Kitt Peak	Spacewatch	·	2.4 km	MPC · JPL
364814	2008 BA_{41}	—	January 31, 2008	La Sagra	OAM	·	1.6 km	MPC · JPL
364815	2008 BO_{41}	—	January 30, 2008	Catalina	CSS	·	2.1 km	MPC · JPL
364816	2008 BY_{48}	—	January 30, 2008	Mount Lemmon	Mount Lemmon Survey	·	1.6 km	MPC · JPL
364817	2008 BJ_{50}	—	November 14, 2007	Mount Lemmon	Mount Lemmon Survey	(5)	1.2 km	MPC · JPL
364818	2008 CN	—	February 1, 2008	Kitami	K. Endate	·	2.6 km	MPC · JPL
364819	2008 CB_{2}	—	February 2, 2008	Wrightwood	J. W. Young	·	2.6 km	MPC · JPL
364820	2008 CZ_{6}	—	December 31, 2007	Mount Lemmon	Mount Lemmon Survey	·	1.6 km	MPC · JPL
364821	2008 CV_{14}	—	December 20, 2007	Mount Lemmon	Mount Lemmon Survey	·	1.8 km	MPC · JPL
364822	2008 CF_{15}	—	February 3, 2008	Kitt Peak	Spacewatch	·	1.7 km	MPC · JPL
364823	2008 CN_{15}	—	November 11, 2007	Mount Lemmon	Mount Lemmon Survey	·	2.3 km	MPC · JPL
364824	2008 CA_{17}	—	February 3, 2008	Kitt Peak	Spacewatch	·	1.5 km	MPC · JPL
364825	2008 CY_{19}	—	February 6, 2008	Catalina	CSS	·	1.7 km	MPC · JPL
364826	2008 CE_{35}	—	February 2, 2008	Kitt Peak	Spacewatch	·	1.3 km	MPC · JPL
364827	2008 CW_{52}	—	January 18, 2008	Mount Lemmon	Mount Lemmon Survey	·	1.3 km	MPC · JPL
364828	2008 CL_{61}	—	February 7, 2008	Mount Lemmon	Mount Lemmon Survey	·	2.1 km	MPC · JPL
364829	2008 CL_{71}	—	February 6, 2008	Catalina	CSS	·	1.7 km	MPC · JPL
364830	2008 CR_{73}	—	February 6, 2008	Catalina	CSS	·	2.0 km	MPC · JPL
364831	2008 CJ_{92}	—	February 8, 2008	Kitt Peak	Spacewatch	(17392)	1.4 km	MPC · JPL
364832	2008 CC_{108}	—	February 2, 2008	Kitt Peak	Spacewatch	·	1.5 km	MPC · JPL
364833	2008 CV_{113}	—	February 10, 2008	Kitt Peak	Spacewatch	·	2.0 km	MPC · JPL
364834	2008 CD_{116}	—	February 8, 2008	Bergisch Gladbach	W. Bickel	·	1.9 km	MPC · JPL
364835	2008 CY_{120}	—	February 6, 2008	Catalina	CSS	·	2.2 km	MPC · JPL
364836	2008 CK_{124}	—	February 7, 2008	Mount Lemmon	Mount Lemmon Survey	·	1.1 km	MPC · JPL
364837	2008 CO_{129}	—	February 8, 2008	Kitt Peak	Spacewatch	·	1.5 km	MPC · JPL
364838	2008 CU_{132}	—	February 8, 2008	Kitt Peak	Spacewatch	·	1.8 km	MPC · JPL
364839	2008 CA_{142}	—	February 8, 2008	Kitt Peak	Spacewatch	·	1.4 km	MPC · JPL
364840	2008 CQ_{143}	—	February 8, 2008	Kitt Peak	Spacewatch	·	2.1 km	MPC · JPL
364841	2008 CE_{144}	—	February 8, 2008	Kitt Peak	Spacewatch	·	1.8 km	MPC · JPL
364842	2008 CZ_{152}	—	December 14, 2007	Mount Lemmon	Mount Lemmon Survey	·	2.1 km	MPC · JPL
364843	2008 CQ_{157}	—	February 9, 2008	Catalina	CSS	·	1.7 km	MPC · JPL
364844	2008 CF_{158}	—	February 9, 2008	Catalina	CSS	·	1.9 km	MPC · JPL
364845	2008 CS_{171}	—	February 12, 2008	Kitt Peak	Spacewatch	·	2.0 km	MPC · JPL
364846	2008 CW_{184}	—	February 14, 2008	Siding Spring	SSS	·	3.1 km	MPC · JPL
364847	2008 CA_{195}	—	February 13, 2008	Mount Lemmon	Mount Lemmon Survey	·	2.3 km	MPC · JPL
364848	2008 CA_{197}	—	February 8, 2008	Kitt Peak	Spacewatch	TIR	3.3 km	MPC · JPL
364849	2008 CJ_{200}	—	February 12, 2008	Mount Lemmon	Mount Lemmon Survey	·	2.1 km	MPC · JPL
364850	2008 CJ_{201}	—	February 2, 2008	Mount Lemmon	Mount Lemmon Survey	·	1.4 km	MPC · JPL
364851	2008 CT_{202}	—	February 8, 2008	Kitt Peak	Spacewatch	·	1.2 km	MPC · JPL
364852	2008 CP_{209}	—	February 3, 2008	Catalina	CSS	·	5.0 km	MPC · JPL
364853	2008 CK_{212}	—	February 7, 2008	Mount Lemmon	Mount Lemmon Survey	·	2.7 km	MPC · JPL
364854	2008 DV_{6}	—	February 24, 2008	Mount Lemmon	Mount Lemmon Survey	EUN	1.4 km	MPC · JPL
364855	2008 DZ_{7}	—	February 10, 2008	Kitt Peak	Spacewatch	·	1.6 km	MPC · JPL
364856	2008 DV_{10}	—	February 16, 2004	Socorro	LINEAR	·	1.5 km	MPC · JPL
364857	2008 DZ_{10}	—	February 26, 2008	Kitt Peak	Spacewatch	·	1.7 km	MPC · JPL
364858	2008 DE_{16}	—	February 27, 2008	Catalina	CSS	·	2.1 km	MPC · JPL
364859	2008 DG_{16}	—	February 27, 2008	Kitt Peak	Spacewatch	·	2.1 km	MPC · JPL
364860	2008 DP_{18}	—	February 26, 2008	Mount Lemmon	Mount Lemmon Survey	PAD	2.8 km	MPC · JPL
364861	2008 DQ_{21}	—	February 28, 2008	Catalina	CSS	JUN	1.4 km	MPC · JPL
364862	2008 DB_{30}	—	February 26, 2008	Mount Lemmon	Mount Lemmon Survey	MIS	2.5 km	MPC · JPL
364863	2008 DF_{31}	—	February 27, 2008	Kitt Peak	Spacewatch	·	3.1 km	MPC · JPL
364864	2008 DX_{36}	—	February 27, 2008	Kitt Peak	Spacewatch	·	2.2 km	MPC · JPL
364865	2008 DS_{37}	—	February 27, 2008	Mount Lemmon	Mount Lemmon Survey	·	2.0 km	MPC · JPL
364866	2008 DZ_{48}	—	February 29, 2008	Catalina	CSS	EUP	5.0 km	MPC · JPL
364867	2008 DQ_{49}	—	February 29, 2008	Mount Lemmon	Mount Lemmon Survey	MAR	1.3 km	MPC · JPL
364868	2008 DR_{52}	—	February 29, 2008	Mount Lemmon	Mount Lemmon Survey	·	2.2 km	MPC · JPL
364869	2008 DJ_{56}	—	November 17, 2007	Kitt Peak	Spacewatch	MAR	1.3 km	MPC · JPL
364870	2008 DP_{57}	—	February 28, 2008	Catalina	CSS	·	3.5 km	MPC · JPL
364871	2008 DU_{63}	—	February 28, 2008	Mount Lemmon	Mount Lemmon Survey	·	1.4 km	MPC · JPL
364872	2008 DF_{70}	—	February 18, 2008	Catalina	CSS	·	2.6 km	MPC · JPL
364873	2008 DJ_{76}	—	February 28, 2008	Mount Lemmon	Mount Lemmon Survey	·	1.4 km	MPC · JPL
364874	2008 DH_{84}	—	February 27, 2008	Mount Lemmon	Mount Lemmon Survey	·	3.0 km	MPC · JPL
364875 Hualookeng	2008 DP_{89}	Hualookeng	February 29, 2008	XuYi	PMO NEO Survey Program	·	1.9 km	MPC · JPL
364876	2008 EJ_{4}	—	February 29, 2008	XuYi	PMO NEO Survey Program	DOR	2.6 km	MPC · JPL
364877	2008 EM_{9}	—	March 9, 2008	Siding Spring	SSS	APO +1km	790 m	MPC · JPL
364878	2008 EU_{11}	—	March 1, 2008	Kitt Peak	Spacewatch	·	2.4 km	MPC · JPL
364879	2008 EP_{25}	—	March 3, 2008	XuYi	PMO NEO Survey Program	·	2.4 km	MPC · JPL
364880	2008 ET_{29}	—	March 4, 2008	Mount Lemmon	Mount Lemmon Survey	·	2.1 km	MPC · JPL
364881	2008 EG_{30}	—	September 19, 2001	Kitt Peak	Spacewatch	·	1.8 km	MPC · JPL
364882	2008 ER_{38}	—	March 1, 2008	Kitt Peak	Spacewatch	·	2.2 km	MPC · JPL
364883	2008 EU_{38}	—	February 10, 2008	Kitt Peak	Spacewatch	·	1.9 km	MPC · JPL
364884	2008 EF_{39}	—	September 18, 2006	Catalina	CSS	·	2.1 km	MPC · JPL
364885	2008 EJ_{43}	—	March 4, 2008	Mount Lemmon	Mount Lemmon Survey	·	1.7 km	MPC · JPL
364886	2008 EL_{49}	—	March 6, 2008	Kitt Peak	Spacewatch	·	2.1 km	MPC · JPL
364887	2008 EU_{56}	—	February 18, 2008	Mount Lemmon	Mount Lemmon Survey	·	2.0 km	MPC · JPL
364888	2008 EN_{57}	—	February 18, 2008	Mount Lemmon	Mount Lemmon Survey	EUN	2.1 km	MPC · JPL
364889	2008 EQ_{57}	—	March 7, 2008	Kitt Peak	Spacewatch	·	2.5 km	MPC · JPL
364890	2008 EF_{62}	—	March 9, 2008	Mount Lemmon	Mount Lemmon Survey	(43176)	2.9 km	MPC · JPL
364891	2008 EO_{62}	—	March 9, 2008	Mount Lemmon	Mount Lemmon Survey	·	1.7 km	MPC · JPL
364892	2008 EY_{69}	—	March 4, 2008	Mount Lemmon	Mount Lemmon Survey	TIN	1.4 km	MPC · JPL
364893	2008 ER_{71}	—	March 6, 2008	Mount Lemmon	Mount Lemmon Survey	·	1.8 km	MPC · JPL
364894	2008 EZ_{72}	—	March 7, 2008	Kitt Peak	Spacewatch	MRX	1.1 km	MPC · JPL
364895	2008 EX_{76}	—	March 7, 2008	Kitt Peak	Spacewatch	·	3.0 km	MPC · JPL
364896	2008 ET_{78}	—	March 8, 2008	Mount Lemmon	Mount Lemmon Survey	(13314)	2.2 km	MPC · JPL
364897	2008 EU_{79}	—	March 9, 2008	Mount Lemmon	Mount Lemmon Survey	ADE	2.2 km	MPC · JPL
364898	2008 EG_{86}	—	March 7, 2008	Catalina	CSS	AEO	1.3 km	MPC · JPL
364899	2008 EU_{105}	—	March 6, 2008	Mount Lemmon	Mount Lemmon Survey	·	1.4 km	MPC · JPL
364900	2008 EF_{107}	—	March 6, 2008	Mount Lemmon	Mount Lemmon Survey	·	1.7 km	MPC · JPL

== 364901–365000 ==
back to top

Designation			Discovery			Properties		Ref
Permanent	Provisional	Named after	Date	Site	Discoverer(s)	Category	Diam.	Ref
364901	2008 EX_{110}	—	March 1, 2008	Kitt Peak	Spacewatch	HOF	2.7 km	MPC · JPL
364902	2008 EW_{121}	—	March 9, 2008	Kitt Peak	Spacewatch	·	1.7 km	MPC · JPL
364903	2008 EZ_{122}	—	March 9, 2008	Kitt Peak	Spacewatch	·	1.5 km	MPC · JPL
364904	2008 EW_{129}	—	March 11, 2008	Kitt Peak	Spacewatch	(13314)	2.1 km	MPC · JPL
364905	2008 EY_{130}	—	October 7, 2005	Catalina	CSS	MRX	1.2 km	MPC · JPL
364906	2008 EE_{132}	—	March 11, 2008	Kitt Peak	Spacewatch	·	2.1 km	MPC · JPL
364907	2008 EJ_{135}	—	March 11, 2008	Kitt Peak	Spacewatch	·	1.6 km	MPC · JPL
364908	2008 EF_{136}	—	March 11, 2008	Kitt Peak	Spacewatch	·	2.0 km	MPC · JPL
364909	2008 EY_{140}	—	March 12, 2008	Kitt Peak	Spacewatch	·	1.8 km	MPC · JPL
364910	2008 EZ_{146}	—	March 15, 2008	Kitt Peak	Spacewatch	·	2.1 km	MPC · JPL
364911	2008 ER_{148}	—	March 2, 2008	Kitt Peak	Spacewatch	·	1.5 km	MPC · JPL
364912	2008 EM_{149}	—	March 4, 2008	Mount Lemmon	Mount Lemmon Survey	·	1.9 km	MPC · JPL
364913	2008 EL_{150}	—	March 10, 2008	Kitt Peak	Spacewatch	KOR	1.3 km	MPC · JPL
364914	2008 EF_{153}	—	March 11, 2008	Mount Lemmon	Mount Lemmon Survey	GEF	1.4 km	MPC · JPL
364915	2008 ED_{154}	—	March 15, 2008	Mount Lemmon	Mount Lemmon Survey	·	1.7 km	MPC · JPL
364916	2008 ES_{154}	—	March 13, 2008	Mount Lemmon	Mount Lemmon Survey	·	1.7 km	MPC · JPL
364917	2008 EQ_{156}	—	March 10, 2008	Kitt Peak	Spacewatch	·	2.1 km	MPC · JPL
364918	2008 EX_{157}	—	March 1, 2008	Kitt Peak	Spacewatch	·	2.4 km	MPC · JPL
364919	2008 EY_{160}	—	March 2, 2008	Kitt Peak	Spacewatch	·	1.9 km	MPC · JPL
364920	2008 ED_{161}	—	March 5, 2008	Mount Lemmon	Mount Lemmon Survey	WIT	1.1 km	MPC · JPL
364921	2008 EV_{161}	—	March 10, 2008	Kitt Peak	Spacewatch	·	2.0 km	MPC · JPL
364922	2008 EA_{162}	—	February 28, 2008	Kitt Peak	Spacewatch	·	1.7 km	MPC · JPL
364923	2008 FF_{2}	—	March 25, 2008	Kitt Peak	Spacewatch	·	2.0 km	MPC · JPL
364924	2008 FK_{9}	—	March 26, 2008	Kitt Peak	Spacewatch	·	1.7 km	MPC · JPL
364925	2008 FK_{13}	—	March 26, 2008	Mount Lemmon	Mount Lemmon Survey	EOS	1.7 km	MPC · JPL
364926	2008 FG_{24}	—	March 27, 2008	Kitt Peak	Spacewatch	·	1.9 km	MPC · JPL
364927	2008 FY_{25}	—	March 27, 2008	Kitt Peak	Spacewatch	·	2.0 km	MPC · JPL
364928	2008 FB_{47}	—	March 28, 2008	Mount Lemmon	Mount Lemmon Survey	·	1.5 km	MPC · JPL
364929	2008 FT_{49}	—	March 28, 2008	Mount Lemmon	Mount Lemmon Survey	·	1.7 km	MPC · JPL
364930	2008 FX_{56}	—	March 28, 2008	Mount Lemmon	Mount Lemmon Survey	KOR	1.2 km	MPC · JPL
364931	2008 FT_{64}	—	March 28, 2008	Kitt Peak	Spacewatch	·	1.9 km	MPC · JPL
364932	2008 FQ_{67}	—	March 28, 2008	Mount Lemmon	Mount Lemmon Survey	·	1.9 km	MPC · JPL
364933	2008 FU_{71}	—	March 30, 2008	Kitt Peak	Spacewatch	·	4.2 km	MPC · JPL
364934	2008 FX_{74}	—	December 15, 2006	Kitt Peak	Spacewatch	·	2.2 km	MPC · JPL
364935	2008 FG_{82}	—	March 1, 2008	Kitt Peak	Spacewatch	(13314)	2.0 km	MPC · JPL
364936	2008 FQ_{95}	—	March 29, 2008	Mount Lemmon	Mount Lemmon Survey	AGN	1.1 km	MPC · JPL
364937	2008 FB_{109}	—	March 31, 2008	Mount Lemmon	Mount Lemmon Survey	KOR	1.3 km	MPC · JPL
364938	2008 FJ_{114}	—	March 31, 2008	Mount Lemmon	Mount Lemmon Survey	PAD	1.4 km	MPC · JPL
364939	2008 FV_{114}	—	March 12, 2008	Kitt Peak	Spacewatch	AGN	1.1 km	MPC · JPL
364940	2008 FW_{117}	—	March 31, 2008	Kitt Peak	Spacewatch	·	3.8 km	MPC · JPL
364941	2008 FN_{118}	—	March 31, 2008	Mount Lemmon	Mount Lemmon Survey	·	1.7 km	MPC · JPL
364942	2008 FT_{120}	—	March 11, 2008	Mount Lemmon	Mount Lemmon Survey	·	1.9 km	MPC · JPL
364943	2008 FK_{124}	—	March 30, 2008	Kitt Peak	Spacewatch	·	2.8 km	MPC · JPL
364944	2008 FX_{127}	—	March 28, 2008	Kitt Peak	Spacewatch	AGN	1.2 km	MPC · JPL
364945	2008 GQ_{6}	—	April 1, 2008	Kitt Peak	Spacewatch	·	2.9 km	MPC · JPL
364946	2008 GV_{17}	—	April 4, 2008	Kitt Peak	Spacewatch	·	2.3 km	MPC · JPL
364947	2008 GM_{18}	—	April 4, 2008	Mount Lemmon	Mount Lemmon Survey	AGN	1.1 km	MPC · JPL
364948	2008 GQ_{23}	—	February 26, 2003	Campo Imperatore	CINEOS	HOF	3.7 km	MPC · JPL
364949	2008 GQ_{29}	—	April 3, 2008	Mount Lemmon	Mount Lemmon Survey	·	2.0 km	MPC · JPL
364950	2008 GT_{33}	—	April 3, 2008	Mount Lemmon	Mount Lemmon Survey	·	1.6 km	MPC · JPL
364951	2008 GE_{57}	—	April 5, 2008	Kitt Peak	Spacewatch	·	1.9 km	MPC · JPL
364952	2008 GE_{70}	—	April 6, 2008	Mount Lemmon	Mount Lemmon Survey	·	2.5 km	MPC · JPL
364953	2008 GS_{70}	—	April 7, 2008	Kitt Peak	Spacewatch	·	1.4 km	MPC · JPL
364954	2008 GE_{80}	—	March 31, 2008	Mount Lemmon	Mount Lemmon Survey	·	1.9 km	MPC · JPL
364955	2008 GK_{81}	—	April 7, 2008	Kitt Peak	Spacewatch	·	3.8 km	MPC · JPL
364956	2008 GN_{82}	—	March 28, 2008	Kitt Peak	Spacewatch	·	2.8 km	MPC · JPL
364957	2008 GR_{86}	—	March 31, 2008	Mount Lemmon	Mount Lemmon Survey	·	2.1 km	MPC · JPL
364958	2008 GC_{88}	—	April 6, 2008	Kitt Peak	Spacewatch	·	1.6 km	MPC · JPL
364959	2008 GD_{94}	—	April 7, 2008	Kitt Peak	Spacewatch	·	2.7 km	MPC · JPL
364960	2008 GJ_{105}	—	October 3, 2005	Catalina	CSS	·	2.5 km	MPC · JPL
364961	2008 GB_{107}	—	February 9, 2008	Mount Lemmon	Mount Lemmon Survey	·	2.0 km	MPC · JPL
364962	2008 GZ_{122}	—	April 13, 2008	Kitt Peak	Spacewatch	HOF	2.5 km	MPC · JPL
364963	2008 GV_{126}	—	April 14, 2008	Mount Lemmon	Mount Lemmon Survey	(32418)	2.4 km	MPC · JPL
364964	2008 GM_{132}	—	April 13, 2008	Mount Lemmon	Mount Lemmon Survey	·	2.6 km	MPC · JPL
364965	2008 GJ_{139}	—	April 3, 2008	Mount Lemmon	Mount Lemmon Survey	MRX	1.0 km	MPC · JPL
364966	2008 GH_{141}	—	April 15, 2008	Kitt Peak	Spacewatch	·	3.1 km	MPC · JPL
364967	2008 GN_{145}	—	April 7, 2008	Kitt Peak	Spacewatch	·	2.0 km	MPC · JPL
364968	2008 HA_{3}	—	April 7, 2008	Bergisch Gladbach	W. Bickel	·	2.0 km	MPC · JPL
364969	2008 HF_{3}	—	April 28, 2008	Mount Lemmon	Mount Lemmon Survey	H	650 m	MPC · JPL
364970	2008 HG_{6}	—	September 14, 2005	Kitt Peak	Spacewatch	·	2.1 km	MPC · JPL
364971	2008 HU_{14}	—	April 4, 2008	Catalina	CSS	·	2.3 km	MPC · JPL
364972	2008 HC_{20}	—	April 26, 2008	Kitt Peak	Spacewatch	·	3.5 km	MPC · JPL
364973	2008 HS_{21}	—	April 5, 2008	Kitt Peak	Spacewatch	·	1.7 km	MPC · JPL
364974	2008 HN_{22}	—	April 26, 2008	Kitt Peak	Spacewatch	·	2.4 km	MPC · JPL
364975	2008 HB_{25}	—	April 27, 2008	Kitt Peak	Spacewatch	·	4.1 km	MPC · JPL
364976	2008 HO_{25}	—	April 27, 2008	Kitt Peak	Spacewatch	EOS	2.1 km	MPC · JPL
364977	2008 HD_{38}	—	April 30, 2008	Mount Lemmon	Mount Lemmon Survey	·	4.3 km	MPC · JPL
364978	2008 HQ_{42}	—	March 12, 2008	Kitt Peak	Spacewatch	KOR	1.3 km	MPC · JPL
364979	2008 HX_{46}	—	April 16, 2008	Mount Lemmon	Mount Lemmon Survey	·	2.9 km	MPC · JPL
364980	2008 HM_{54}	—	April 29, 2008	Kitt Peak	Spacewatch	EOS	1.9 km	MPC · JPL
364981	2008 HE_{59}	—	April 30, 2008	Mount Lemmon	Mount Lemmon Survey	·	2.0 km	MPC · JPL
364982	2008 HN_{62}	—	April 30, 2008	Kitt Peak	Spacewatch	·	4.8 km	MPC · JPL
364983	2008 HP_{65}	—	April 29, 2008	Socorro	LINEAR	·	1.9 km	MPC · JPL
364984	2008 HB_{66}	—	April 30, 2008	Mount Lemmon	Mount Lemmon Survey	BRA	1.7 km	MPC · JPL
364985	2008 HS_{67}	—	April 30, 2008	Mount Lemmon	Mount Lemmon Survey	·	1.6 km	MPC · JPL
364986	2008 JR_{2}	—	May 3, 2008	Kitt Peak	Spacewatch	H	580 m	MPC · JPL
364987	2008 JY_{8}	—	May 1, 2008	Catalina	CSS	·	4.3 km	MPC · JPL
364988	2008 JZ_{10}	—	May 3, 2008	Kitt Peak	Spacewatch	EOS	2.2 km	MPC · JPL
364989	2008 JT_{12}	—	May 3, 2008	Kitt Peak	Spacewatch	·	2.2 km	MPC · JPL
364990	2008 JD_{18}	—	May 4, 2008	Kitt Peak	Spacewatch	EOS	1.9 km	MPC · JPL
364991	2008 JL_{33}	—	April 10, 2008	Kitt Peak	Spacewatch	·	3.8 km	MPC · JPL
364992	2008 JG_{39}	—	May 6, 2008	Mount Lemmon	Mount Lemmon Survey	·	3.3 km	MPC · JPL
364993	2008 KA	—	May 16, 2008	Kitt Peak	Spacewatch	T_{j} (2.98) · EUP	6.8 km	MPC · JPL
364994	2008 KM_{1}	—	May 26, 2008	Kitt Peak	Spacewatch	·	3.1 km	MPC · JPL
364995	2008 KE_{3}	—	December 25, 2005	Kitt Peak	Spacewatch	EOS	1.9 km	MPC · JPL
364996	2008 KF_{7}	—	May 26, 2008	Kitt Peak	Spacewatch	·	2.5 km	MPC · JPL
364997	2008 KJ_{10}	—	May 28, 2008	Mount Lemmon	Mount Lemmon Survey	·	3.6 km	MPC · JPL
364998	2008 KG_{12}	—	April 1, 2008	Kitt Peak	Spacewatch	EOS	2.0 km	MPC · JPL
364999	2008 KO_{13}	—	May 3, 2003	Kitt Peak	Spacewatch	·	2.0 km	MPC · JPL
365000	2008 KV_{16}	—	May 27, 2008	Kitt Peak	Spacewatch	·	2.6 km	MPC · JPL

back to top

== See also ==
- Meanings of minor-planet names: 364001–365000
