= Meanings of minor-planet names: 365001–366000 =

As minor planet discoveries are confirmed, they are given a permanent number by the IAU's Minor Planet Center (MPC), and the discoverers can then submit names for them, following the IAU's naming conventions. The list below concerns those minor planets in the specified number-range that have received names, and explains the meanings of those names.

Official naming citations of newly named small Solar System bodies are approved and published in a bulletin by IAU's Working Group for Small Bodies Nomenclature (WGSBN). Before May 2021, citations were published in MPC's Minor Planet Circulars for many decades. Recent citations can also be found on the JPL Small-Body Database (SBDB). Until his death in 2016, German astronomer Lutz D. Schmadel compiled these citations into the Dictionary of Minor Planet Names (DMP) and regularly updated the collection.

Based on Paul Herget's The Names of the Minor Planets, Schmadel also researched the unclear origin of numerous asteroids, most of which had been named prior to World War II. This article incorporates text from this source, which is in the public domain: SBDB New namings may only be added to this list below after official publication as the preannouncement of names is condemned. The WGSBN publishes a comprehensive guideline for the naming rules of non-cometary small Solar System bodies.

== 365001–365100 ==
| Named minor planet | Provisional | This minor planet was named for... | Ref · Catalog |
|---|---|---|---|
There are no named minor planets in this number range

== 365101–365200 ==
back to top

| Named minor planet | Provisional | This minor planet was named for... | Ref · Catalog |
|---|---|---|---|
| 365130 Birnfeld | 2009 DU_{28} | Birnfeld, a German village located in the Hassberge Nature Park in northern Bavaria | JPL · 365130 |
| 365131 Hassberge | 2009 DQ_{29} | Hassberge, a nature park located northwest of Bamberg, Germany | JPL · 365131 |
| 365159 Garching | 2009 DU_{111} | Garching, a German city north of Munich. | JPL · 365159 |
| 365190 Kenting | 2009 FC_{30} | Kenting National Park, Taiwan, has hosted the annual Hengchun Star Party since 2013. About 2000 people attend each year. | IAU · 365190 |

== 365201–365300 ==
back to top

| Named minor planet | Provisional | This minor planet was named for... | Ref · Catalog |
|---|---|---|---|
| 365250 Vladimirsurdin | 2009 OF_{7} | Vladimir Surdin (born 1953) is a Russian astronomer at Moscow State University. As one of the most famous science communicators in Russia, he has sparked many people's interest in space. | IAU · 365250 |

== 365301–365400 ==
back to top

| Named minor planet | Provisional | This minor planet was named for... | Ref · Catalog |
|---|---|---|---|
| 365375 Serebrov | 2009 UZ_{3} | Aleksandr Serebrov (1944–2013), was a Hero of the Soviet Union, a Pilot-Cosmonaut of the USSR and the first president of the Soyuz Youth Aerospace Society. He was the author of over 20 scientific works and four inventions. He made four spaceflights and ten spacewalks | JPL · 365375 |

== 365401–365500 ==
back to top

| Named minor planet | Provisional | This minor planet was named for... | Ref · Catalog |
|---|---|---|---|
| 365443 Holiday | 2010 MU_{49} | Billie Holiday (1915–1959), born Eleanora Fagan, was one of the greatest jazz singers and songwriters of all time. She collaborated with numerous jazz greats, including Lester Young, Count Bassie and Artie Shaw. Her gorgeous voice and heartfelt songs continue to inspire. | JPL · 365443 |

== 365501–365600 ==
back to top

| Named minor planet | Provisional | This minor planet was named for... | Ref · Catalog |
|---|---|---|---|
There are no named minor planets in this number range

== 365601–365700 ==
back to top

| Named minor planet | Provisional | This minor planet was named for... | Ref · Catalog |
|---|---|---|---|
| 365604 Rusholme | 2010 TG_{184} | Benjamin Rusholme (born 1974) has contributed to the Very Small Array and QUaD Cosmic Microwave Background telescopes, the Planck and Euclid missions, and the Zwicky Transient Facility time-domain survey. | JPL · 365604 |

== 365701–365800 ==
back to top

| Named minor planet | Provisional | This minor planet was named for... | Ref · Catalog |
|---|---|---|---|
| 365739 Peterbecker | 2010 WS_{12} | Peter Becker (1672–1753), a professor of mathematics at the University of Rostock, Germany | MPC · 365739 |
| 365756 ISON | 2010 WZ_{71} | The International Scientific Optical Network (ISON) is an international collaboration of optical observatories. The main scientific tasks of the ISON network are the study of the populations of space debris and minor solar-system, and observation of the optical counterparts of gamma-ray bursts. | JPL · 365756 |
| 365761 Popovici | 2010 XQ_{4} | Călin Popovici (1910–1977), a Romanian astronomer | JPL · 365761 |
| 365786 Florencelosse | 2010 YJ | Florence Losse (born 1963), a French teacher | JPL · 365786 |

== 365801–365900 ==
back to top

| Named minor planet | Provisional | This minor planet was named for... | Ref · Catalog |
|---|---|---|---|
There are no named minor planets in this number range

== 365901–366000 ==
back to top

| Named minor planet | Provisional | This minor planet was named for... | Ref · Catalog |
|---|---|---|---|
There are no named minor planets in this number range

back to top

| Preceded by 364,001–365,000 | Meanings of minor-planet names List of minor planets: 365,001–366,000 | Succeeded by 366,001–367,000 |
