= List of minor planets: 365001–366000 =

The following is a partial list of minor planets, running from minor-planet number 365001 through 366000, inclusive. The primary data for this and other partial lists is based on JPL's "Small-Body Orbital Elements" and data available from the Minor Planet Center. Critical list information is also provided by the MPC, unless otherwise specified from Lowell Observatory. A detailed description of the table's columns and additional sources are given on the main page including a complete list of every page in this series, and a statistical break-up on the dynamical classification of minor planets.

Also see the summary list of all named bodies in numerical and alphabetical order, and the corresponding naming citations for the number range of this particular list. New namings may only be added to this list after official publication, as the preannouncement of names is condemned by the Working Group for Small Bodies Nomenclature of the International Astronomical Union.

Near-Earth obj.	MBA (inner)	MBA (outer)	Centaur
Mars-crosser	MBA (middle)	Jupiter trojan	Trans-Neptunian obj.
Unclassified

== 365001–365100 ==
Designation			Discovery			Properties		Ref
Permanent	Provisional	Named after	Date	Site	Discoverer(s)	Category	Diam.	Ref
365001	2008 KZ_{16}	—	May 27, 2008	Kitt Peak	Spacewatch	·	2.2 km	MPC · JPL
365002	2008 KB_{17}	—	May 27, 2008	Kitt Peak	Spacewatch	EOS	1.9 km	MPC · JPL
365003	2008 KJ_{27}	—	April 6, 2008	Kitt Peak	Spacewatch	EOS	1.5 km	MPC · JPL
365004	2008 KM_{32}	—	April 6, 2008	Mount Lemmon	Mount Lemmon Survey	EOS	2.0 km	MPC · JPL
365005	2008 KB_{39}	—	May 30, 2008	Kitt Peak	Spacewatch	·	1.8 km	MPC · JPL
365006	2008 KR_{40}	—	May 29, 2008	Mount Lemmon	Mount Lemmon Survey	·	2.7 km	MPC · JPL
365007	2008 LX	—	June 1, 2008	Mount Lemmon	Mount Lemmon Survey	·	1.6 km	MPC · JPL
365008	2008 LZ_{4}	—	June 3, 2008	Mount Lemmon	Mount Lemmon Survey	·	3.6 km	MPC · JPL
365009	2008 LU_{6}	—	June 3, 2008	Kitt Peak	Spacewatch	·	1.2 km	MPC · JPL
365010	2008 LO_{12}	—	June 10, 2008	Magdalena Ridge	Ryan, W. H.	VER	3.0 km	MPC · JPL
365011	2008 LL_{13}	—	June 7, 2008	Kitt Peak	Spacewatch	·	1.6 km	MPC · JPL
365012	2008 NH_{2}	—	June 2, 2008	Mount Lemmon	Mount Lemmon Survey	·	3.2 km	MPC · JPL
365013	2008 OV_{1}	—	July 27, 2008	Charleston	R. Holmes	H	750 m	MPC · JPL
365014	2008 OX_{2}	—	July 28, 2008	Mount Lemmon	Mount Lemmon Survey	APO · PHA	340 m	MPC · JPL
365015	2008 OY_{6}	—	July 29, 2008	Črni Vrh	Matičič, S.	·	2.9 km	MPC · JPL
365016	2008 OK_{20}	—	July 26, 2008	Siding Spring	SSS	·	3.0 km	MPC · JPL
365017	2008 PB_{11}	—	August 5, 2008	La Sagra	OAM	·	5.3 km	MPC · JPL
365018	2008 PS_{15}	—	August 11, 2008	Pla D'Arguines	R. Ferrando	EOS	1.8 km	MPC · JPL
365019	2008 QS_{4}	—	August 20, 2008	Kitt Peak	Spacewatch	·	2.4 km	MPC · JPL
365020	2008 QW_{7}	—	August 26, 2008	Farra d'Isonzo	Farra d'Isonzo	·	1.4 km	MPC · JPL
365021	2008 QG_{9}	—	July 29, 2008	Kitt Peak	Spacewatch	·	3.0 km	MPC · JPL
365022	2008 QK_{11}	—	August 26, 2008	Dauban	Kugel, F.	·	3.2 km	MPC · JPL
365023	2008 QT_{47}	—	August 30, 2008	Socorro	LINEAR	·	2.4 km	MPC · JPL
365024	2008 RC_{36}	—	September 2, 2008	Kitt Peak	Spacewatch	·	2.3 km	MPC · JPL
365025	2008 RK_{39}	—	September 2, 2008	Kitt Peak	Spacewatch	·	2.5 km	MPC · JPL
365026	2008 RU_{121}	—	September 2, 2008	Kitt Peak	Spacewatch	3:2	5.9 km	MPC · JPL
365027	2008 RO_{128}	—	September 8, 2008	Kitt Peak	Spacewatch	LUT	3.9 km	MPC · JPL
365028	2008 RP_{145}	—	September 5, 2008	Socorro	LINEAR	·	3.6 km	MPC · JPL
365029	2008 SY_{1}	—	September 23, 2008	Catalina	CSS	H	630 m	MPC · JPL
365030	2008 SL_{11}	—	September 24, 2008	Kachina	Hobart, J.	·	2.9 km	MPC · JPL
365031	2008 SE_{14}	—	September 19, 2008	Kitt Peak	Spacewatch	H	590 m	MPC · JPL
365032	2008 SK_{22}	—	September 19, 2008	Kitt Peak	Spacewatch	·	3.1 km	MPC · JPL
365033	2008 SP_{80}	—	September 23, 2008	Catalina	CSS	T_{j} (2.98)	3.4 km	MPC · JPL
365034	2008 SU_{82}	—	September 26, 2008	Sierra Stars	Tozzi, F.	·	6.6 km	MPC · JPL
365035	2008 SV_{143}	—	September 24, 2008	Mount Lemmon	Mount Lemmon Survey	·	1.6 km	MPC · JPL
365036	2008 SR_{177}	—	September 23, 2008	Catalina	CSS	·	2.2 km	MPC · JPL
365037	2008 SQ_{261}	—	September 24, 2008	Kitt Peak	Spacewatch	L4 · ERY	8.6 km	MPC · JPL
365038	2008 SG_{284}	—	September 24, 2008	Catalina	CSS	·	3.3 km	MPC · JPL
365039	2008 SB_{291}	—	September 28, 2008	Catalina	CSS	H	570 m	MPC · JPL
365040	2008 TK_{3}	—	November 6, 2003	Socorro	LINEAR	H	760 m	MPC · JPL
365041	2008 TK_{43}	—	October 1, 2008	Mount Lemmon	Mount Lemmon Survey	EOS	2.4 km	MPC · JPL
365042	2008 TU_{73}	—	October 2, 2008	Kitt Peak	Spacewatch	·	4.0 km	MPC · JPL
365043	2008 TF_{115}	—	October 6, 2008	Catalina	CSS	EOS	2.4 km	MPC · JPL
365044	2008 TH_{167}	—	October 8, 2008	Mount Lemmon	Mount Lemmon Survey	EOS	2.3 km	MPC · JPL
365045	2008 UA_{228}	—	September 21, 2008	Mount Lemmon	Mount Lemmon Survey	·	2.5 km	MPC · JPL
365046	2008 UK_{312}	—	October 30, 2008	Mount Lemmon	Mount Lemmon Survey	·	3.2 km	MPC · JPL
365047	2008 UA_{328}	—	October 30, 2008	Mount Lemmon	Mount Lemmon Survey	·	3.3 km	MPC · JPL
365048	2008 UV_{370}	—	October 26, 2008	Mount Lemmon	Mount Lemmon Survey	·	1.4 km	MPC · JPL
365049	2008 VQ_{51}	—	November 6, 2008	Kitt Peak	Spacewatch	·	4.2 km	MPC · JPL
365050	2008 VL_{72}	—	November 6, 2008	Mount Lemmon	Mount Lemmon Survey	·	990 m	MPC · JPL
365051	2008 WL_{2}	—	November 18, 2008	La Sagra	OAM	H	730 m	MPC · JPL
365052	2008 WP_{33}	—	November 17, 2008	Kitt Peak	Spacewatch	·	1.6 km	MPC · JPL
365053	2008 WP_{44}	—	November 17, 2008	Kitt Peak	Spacewatch	·	670 m	MPC · JPL
365054	2008 WM_{45}	—	November 17, 2008	Kitt Peak	Spacewatch	·	660 m	MPC · JPL
365055	2008 WZ_{80}	—	October 28, 2008	Kitt Peak	Spacewatch	·	560 m	MPC · JPL
365056	2008 YJ_{7}	—	December 2, 2008	Socorro	LINEAR	H	720 m	MPC · JPL
365057	2008 YJ_{12}	—	December 21, 2008	Mount Lemmon	Mount Lemmon Survey	·	630 m	MPC · JPL
365058	2008 YF_{34}	—	December 21, 2008	Kitt Peak	Spacewatch	·	1.0 km	MPC · JPL
365059	2008 YP_{37}	—	December 22, 2008	Kitt Peak	Spacewatch	·	790 m	MPC · JPL
365060	2008 YV_{43}	—	December 29, 2008	Kitt Peak	Spacewatch	·	750 m	MPC · JPL
365061	2008 YU_{52}	—	October 24, 2008	Mount Lemmon	Mount Lemmon Survey	·	1.9 km	MPC · JPL
365062	2008 YG_{62}	—	December 30, 2008	Mount Lemmon	Mount Lemmon Survey	·	820 m	MPC · JPL
365063	2008 YL_{69}	—	December 4, 2008	Mount Lemmon	Mount Lemmon Survey	·	740 m	MPC · JPL
365064	2008 YS_{100}	—	December 29, 2008	Kitt Peak	Spacewatch	·	760 m	MPC · JPL
365065	2008 YQ_{101}	—	December 29, 2008	Kitt Peak	Spacewatch	·	750 m	MPC · JPL
365066	2008 YC_{109}	—	December 29, 2008	Kitt Peak	Spacewatch	·	700 m	MPC · JPL
365067	2008 YQ_{126}	—	December 30, 2008	Kitt Peak	Spacewatch	·	720 m	MPC · JPL
365068	2008 YY_{127}	—	December 30, 2008	Kitt Peak	Spacewatch	·	770 m	MPC · JPL
365069	2008 YA_{141}	—	December 30, 2008	Mount Lemmon	Mount Lemmon Survey	·	690 m	MPC · JPL
365070	2008 YT_{165}	—	December 30, 2008	Kitt Peak	Spacewatch	·	550 m	MPC · JPL
365071	2009 AV	—	January 2, 2009	Mount Lemmon	Mount Lemmon Survey	APO +1km · PHA · critical	670 m	MPC · JPL
365072	2009 AQ_{11}	—	January 2, 2009	Mount Lemmon	Mount Lemmon Survey	·	710 m	MPC · JPL
365073	2009 AM_{41}	—	January 15, 2009	Kitt Peak	Spacewatch	·	680 m	MPC · JPL
365074	2009 AA_{43}	—	January 3, 2009	Mount Lemmon	Mount Lemmon Survey	·	770 m	MPC · JPL
365075	2009 BA_{13}	—	March 4, 2005	Catalina	CSS	·	1.6 km	MPC · JPL
365076	2009 BK_{13}	—	January 22, 2009	Socorro	LINEAR	(883)	1.0 km	MPC · JPL
365077	2009 BD_{17}	—	October 31, 2005	Mauna Kea	A. Boattini	·	750 m	MPC · JPL
365078	2009 BS_{36}	—	January 16, 2009	Kitt Peak	Spacewatch	·	920 m	MPC · JPL
365079	2009 BW_{37}	—	January 16, 2009	Kitt Peak	Spacewatch	·	730 m	MPC · JPL
365080	2009 BO_{46}	—	January 16, 2009	Kitt Peak	Spacewatch	NYS	1.2 km	MPC · JPL
365081	2009 BL_{72}	—	January 28, 2009	Dauban	Kugel, F.	·	770 m	MPC · JPL
365082	2009 BD_{79}	—	January 28, 2009	Hibiscus	Teamo, N.	·	740 m	MPC · JPL
365083	2009 BY_{90}	—	January 25, 2009	Kitt Peak	Spacewatch	·	1.1 km	MPC · JPL
365084	2009 BD_{102}	—	January 29, 2009	Mount Lemmon	Mount Lemmon Survey	TIN	1.8 km	MPC · JPL
365085	2009 BG_{105}	—	December 22, 2008	Mount Lemmon	Mount Lemmon Survey	·	710 m	MPC · JPL
365086	2009 BY_{105}	—	January 25, 2009	Kitt Peak	Spacewatch	·	1 km	MPC · JPL
365087	2009 BO_{106}	—	January 26, 2009	Purple Mountain	PMO NEO Survey Program	·	1.3 km	MPC · JPL
365088	2009 BS_{106}	—	January 28, 2009	Catalina	CSS	·	860 m	MPC · JPL
365089	2009 BS_{110}	—	January 31, 2009	Mount Lemmon	Mount Lemmon Survey	·	910 m	MPC · JPL
365090	2009 BE_{117}	—	January 29, 2009	Mount Lemmon	Mount Lemmon Survey	·	1.2 km	MPC · JPL
365091	2009 BE_{124}	—	January 31, 2009	Kitt Peak	Spacewatch	·	900 m	MPC · JPL
365092	2009 BA_{126}	—	January 15, 2009	Kitt Peak	Spacewatch	NYS	960 m	MPC · JPL
365093	2009 BJ_{130}	—	January 31, 2009	Mount Lemmon	Mount Lemmon Survey	·	850 m	MPC · JPL
365094	2009 BF_{131}	—	January 31, 2009	Mount Lemmon	Mount Lemmon Survey	·	880 m	MPC · JPL
365095	2009 BZ_{141}	—	January 30, 2009	Kitt Peak	Spacewatch	NYS	1.0 km	MPC · JPL
365096	2009 BY_{143}	—	January 30, 2009	Kitt Peak	Spacewatch	·	780 m	MPC · JPL
365097	2009 BX_{149}	—	January 31, 2009	Kitt Peak	Spacewatch	·	1.0 km	MPC · JPL
365098	2009 BF_{150}	—	January 31, 2009	Kitt Peak	Spacewatch	·	1.0 km	MPC · JPL
365099	2009 BZ_{158}	—	January 31, 2009	Kitt Peak	Spacewatch	MAS	660 m	MPC · JPL
365100	2009 BG_{159}	—	January 31, 2009	Kitt Peak	Spacewatch	MAS	630 m	MPC · JPL

== 365101–365200 ==
back to top

Designation			Discovery			Properties		Ref
Permanent	Provisional	Named after	Date	Site	Discoverer(s)	Category	Diam.	Ref
365101	2009 BN_{159}	—	January 31, 2009	Kitt Peak	Spacewatch	NYS	880 m	MPC · JPL
365102	2009 BS_{173}	—	January 20, 2009	Kitt Peak	Spacewatch	·	840 m	MPC · JPL
365103	2009 BJ_{178}	—	January 17, 2009	Kitt Peak	Spacewatch	·	880 m	MPC · JPL
365104	2009 BM_{179}	—	January 29, 2009	Mount Lemmon	Mount Lemmon Survey	·	980 m	MPC · JPL
365105	2009 BC_{182}	—	January 30, 2009	Mount Lemmon	Mount Lemmon Survey	·	990 m	MPC · JPL
365106	2009 BK_{182}	—	January 17, 2009	Kitt Peak	Spacewatch	NYS ·	1.7 km	MPC · JPL
365107	2009 BZ_{182}	—	January 20, 2009	Mount Lemmon	Mount Lemmon Survey	·	2.4 km	MPC · JPL
365108	2009 BF_{186}	—	January 17, 2009	Kitt Peak	Spacewatch	·	790 m	MPC · JPL
365109	2009 CT_{12}	—	February 1, 2009	Kitt Peak	Spacewatch	·	870 m	MPC · JPL
365110	2009 CH_{14}	—	February 2, 2009	Mount Lemmon	Mount Lemmon Survey	·	880 m	MPC · JPL
365111	2009 CA_{18}	—	February 3, 2009	Mount Lemmon	Mount Lemmon Survey	·	780 m	MPC · JPL
365112	2009 CU_{23}	—	November 24, 2008	Mount Lemmon	Mount Lemmon Survey	·	1.2 km	MPC · JPL
365113	2009 CH_{33}	—	February 1, 2009	Kitt Peak	Spacewatch	·	760 m	MPC · JPL
365114	2009 CQ_{44}	—	February 14, 2009	Kitt Peak	Spacewatch	·	1.2 km	MPC · JPL
365115	2009 CD_{47}	—	February 14, 2009	Kitt Peak	Spacewatch	·	650 m	MPC · JPL
365116	2009 CH_{48}	—	February 14, 2009	Kitt Peak	Spacewatch	·	1.5 km	MPC · JPL
365117	2009 CZ_{49}	—	December 30, 2008	Mount Lemmon	Mount Lemmon Survey	NYS	1.4 km	MPC · JPL
365118	2009 CO_{56}	—	February 3, 2009	Mount Lemmon	Mount Lemmon Survey	·	1.0 km	MPC · JPL
365119	2009 CJ_{57}	—	February 1, 2009	Mount Lemmon	Mount Lemmon Survey	NYS	1.2 km	MPC · JPL
365120	2009 CL_{59}	—	February 3, 2009	Kitt Peak	Spacewatch	·	910 m	MPC · JPL
365121	2009 CH_{63}	—	February 1, 2009	Catalina	CSS	·	1.0 km	MPC · JPL
365122	2009 CJ_{65}	—	February 1, 2009	Kitt Peak	Spacewatch	NYS	1.1 km	MPC · JPL
365123	2009 CL_{65}	—	February 5, 2009	Kitt Peak	Spacewatch	·	730 m	MPC · JPL
365124	2009 DS_{1}	—	February 16, 2009	Dauban	Kugel, F.	·	1.1 km	MPC · JPL
365125	2009 DQ_{7}	—	February 19, 2009	Kitt Peak	Spacewatch	MAS	780 m	MPC · JPL
365126	2009 DE_{9}	—	February 19, 2009	Mount Lemmon	Mount Lemmon Survey	·	1.2 km	MPC · JPL
365127	2009 DE_{16}	—	February 17, 2009	La Sagra	OAM	·	1.1 km	MPC · JPL
365128	2009 DF_{22}	—	February 19, 2009	Kitt Peak	Spacewatch	·	750 m	MPC · JPL
365129	2009 DB_{23}	—	February 19, 2009	Kitt Peak	Spacewatch	·	750 m	MPC · JPL
365130 Birnfeld	2009 DU_{28}	Birnfeld	February 23, 2009	Calar Alto	F. Hormuth	·	1.0 km	MPC · JPL
365131 Hassberge	2009 DQ_{29}	Hassberge	February 23, 2009	Calar Alto	F. Hormuth	·	1.1 km	MPC · JPL
365132	2009 DZ_{31}	—	February 20, 2009	Kitt Peak	Spacewatch	·	1.2 km	MPC · JPL
365133	2009 DY_{32}	—	February 20, 2009	Kitt Peak	Spacewatch	·	1.0 km	MPC · JPL
365134	2009 DK_{36}	—	February 22, 2009	Mount Lemmon	Mount Lemmon Survey	·	930 m	MPC · JPL
365135	2009 DA_{39}	—	February 22, 2009	Kitt Peak	Spacewatch	·	1.1 km	MPC · JPL
365136	2009 DX_{44}	—	February 27, 2009	Mayhill	Lowe, A.	·	1.2 km	MPC · JPL
365137	2009 DG_{52}	—	February 22, 2009	Kitt Peak	Spacewatch	·	610 m	MPC · JPL
365138	2009 DO_{54}	—	February 22, 2009	Kitt Peak	Spacewatch	·	1.1 km	MPC · JPL
365139	2009 DY_{54}	—	February 22, 2009	Kitt Peak	Spacewatch	·	1.0 km	MPC · JPL
365140	2009 DF_{55}	—	February 22, 2009	Kitt Peak	Spacewatch	MAS	820 m	MPC · JPL
365141	2009 DN_{55}	—	February 22, 2009	Kitt Peak	Spacewatch	MAS	680 m	MPC · JPL
365142	2009 DY_{55}	—	February 22, 2009	Kitt Peak	Spacewatch	·	1.5 km	MPC · JPL
365143	2009 DD_{56}	—	February 22, 2009	Kitt Peak	Spacewatch	NYS	1.1 km	MPC · JPL
365144	2009 DA_{59}	—	February 22, 2009	Kitt Peak	Spacewatch	·	1.0 km	MPC · JPL
365145	2009 DV_{59}	—	February 22, 2009	Kitt Peak	Spacewatch	NYS	1.1 km	MPC · JPL
365146	2009 DM_{60}	—	February 22, 2009	Kitt Peak	Spacewatch	·	980 m	MPC · JPL
365147	2009 DF_{62}	—	February 22, 2009	Kitt Peak	Spacewatch	·	1.1 km	MPC · JPL
365148	2009 DL_{64}	—	February 22, 2009	Kitt Peak	Spacewatch	V	780 m	MPC · JPL
365149	2009 DD_{70}	—	February 26, 2009	Catalina	CSS	·	1.1 km	MPC · JPL
365150	2009 DL_{71}	—	February 1, 2009	Mount Lemmon	Mount Lemmon Survey	NYS	1.3 km	MPC · JPL
365151	2009 DO_{73}	—	February 26, 2009	Kitt Peak	Spacewatch	EUN	1.2 km	MPC · JPL
365152	2009 DB_{75}	—	February 19, 2009	Kitt Peak	Spacewatch	NYS	1.2 km	MPC · JPL
365153	2009 DY_{88}	—	February 22, 2009	Mount Lemmon	Mount Lemmon Survey	·	1 km	MPC · JPL
365154	2009 DS_{93}	—	February 1, 2005	Catalina	CSS	·	1.2 km	MPC · JPL
365155	2009 DT_{97}	—	February 26, 2009	Kitt Peak	Spacewatch	NYS	1.2 km	MPC · JPL
365156	2009 DW_{101}	—	February 26, 2009	Kitt Peak	Spacewatch	·	1.0 km	MPC · JPL
365157	2009 DU_{102}	—	February 26, 2009	Kitt Peak	Spacewatch	·	880 m	MPC · JPL
365158	2009 DN_{103}	—	February 26, 2009	Kitt Peak	Spacewatch	·	1.0 km	MPC · JPL
365159 Garching	2009 DU_{111}	Garching	February 26, 2009	Calar Alto	F. Hormuth	MAS	710 m	MPC · JPL
365160	2009 DA_{117}	—	February 27, 2009	Kitt Peak	Spacewatch	V	500 m	MPC · JPL
365161	2009 DU_{118}	—	February 27, 2009	Kitt Peak	Spacewatch	·	1.4 km	MPC · JPL
365162	2009 DN_{120}	—	May 26, 2006	Mount Lemmon	Mount Lemmon Survey	NYS	1.4 km	MPC · JPL
365163	2009 DK_{124}	—	February 19, 2009	Kitt Peak	Spacewatch	·	1.2 km	MPC · JPL
365164	2009 DD_{127}	—	February 20, 2009	Kitt Peak	Spacewatch	·	1.0 km	MPC · JPL
365165	2009 DH_{129}	—	February 27, 2009	Kitt Peak	Spacewatch	MAS	760 m	MPC · JPL
365166	2009 DG_{131}	—	February 27, 2009	Kitt Peak	Spacewatch	NYS	1.1 km	MPC · JPL
365167	2009 DR_{136}	—	February 24, 2009	Catalina	CSS	·	800 m	MPC · JPL
365168	2009 DO_{138}	—	February 20, 2009	Kitt Peak	Spacewatch	NYS	1.2 km	MPC · JPL
365169	2009 DP_{138}	—	February 20, 2009	Mount Lemmon	Mount Lemmon Survey	·	1.1 km	MPC · JPL
365170	2009 DQ_{139}	—	September 10, 2007	Mount Lemmon	Mount Lemmon Survey	NYS	1.1 km	MPC · JPL
365171	2009 DJ_{140}	—	February 20, 2009	Socorro	LINEAR	·	1.4 km	MPC · JPL
365172	2009 DK_{141}	—	February 20, 2009	Kitt Peak	Spacewatch	·	800 m	MPC · JPL
365173	2009 EX_{11}	—	February 4, 2009	Mount Lemmon	Mount Lemmon Survey	NYS	950 m	MPC · JPL
365174	2009 ES_{21}	—	March 13, 2009	La Sagra	OAM	·	1.3 km	MPC · JPL
365175	2009 EE_{22}	—	March 1, 2009	Kitt Peak	Spacewatch	NYS	1.1 km	MPC · JPL
365176	2009 ET_{30}	—	March 7, 2009	Mount Lemmon	Mount Lemmon Survey	NYS	1.3 km	MPC · JPL
365177	2009 FR_{1}	—	March 16, 2009	La Sagra	OAM	·	1.2 km	MPC · JPL
365178	2009 FL_{3}	—	February 19, 2009	Kitt Peak	Spacewatch	NYS	980 m	MPC · JPL
365179	2009 FP_{4}	—	March 19, 2009	Mount Lemmon	Mount Lemmon Survey	·	1.7 km	MPC · JPL
365180	2009 FT_{5}	—	March 16, 2009	Kitt Peak	Spacewatch	·	990 m	MPC · JPL
365181	2009 FC_{9}	—	March 16, 2009	Mount Lemmon	Mount Lemmon Survey	·	1.1 km	MPC · JPL
365182	2009 FY_{19}	—	January 15, 2005	Kitt Peak	Spacewatch	·	1.7 km	MPC · JPL
365183	2009 FM_{23}	—	March 21, 2009	Mount Lemmon	Mount Lemmon Survey	·	1.3 km	MPC · JPL
365184	2009 FV_{24}	—	February 24, 2009	Catalina	CSS	·	1.6 km	MPC · JPL
365185	2009 FT_{25}	—	March 17, 2009	Kitt Peak	Spacewatch	·	1.2 km	MPC · JPL
365186	2009 FV_{25}	—	March 22, 2009	Taunus	R. Kling, Zimmer, U.	·	1.5 km	MPC · JPL
365187	2009 FA_{27}	—	February 20, 2009	Mount Lemmon	Mount Lemmon Survey	·	690 m	MPC · JPL
365188	2009 FS_{27}	—	March 21, 2009	Catalina	CSS	·	760 m	MPC · JPL
365189	2009 FM_{29}	—	March 22, 2009	Mount Lemmon	Mount Lemmon Survey	·	1.2 km	MPC · JPL
365190 Kenting	2009 FC_{30}	Kenting	March 22, 2009	Lulin	Tsai, Y.-S.	NYS	1.2 km	MPC · JPL
365191	2009 FY_{32}	—	March 17, 2009	Kitt Peak	Spacewatch	·	880 m	MPC · JPL
365192	2009 FL_{34}	—	March 24, 2009	Kitt Peak	Spacewatch	·	1.4 km	MPC · JPL
365193	2009 FH_{35}	—	September 26, 2003	Apache Point	SDSS	NYS	1.2 km	MPC · JPL
365194	2009 FY_{38}	—	March 21, 2009	Catalina	CSS	·	1.4 km	MPC · JPL
365195	2009 FC_{41}	—	March 20, 2009	La Sagra	OAM	·	1.2 km	MPC · JPL
365196	2009 FM_{44}	—	March 19, 2009	Kitt Peak	Spacewatch	·	920 m	MPC · JPL
365197	2009 FE_{53}	—	March 29, 2009	Mount Lemmon	Mount Lemmon Survey	·	1.1 km	MPC · JPL
365198	2009 FQ_{53}	—	March 29, 2009	Mount Lemmon	Mount Lemmon Survey	·	1.6 km	MPC · JPL
365199	2009 FB_{62}	—	March 19, 2009	Kitt Peak	Spacewatch	·	1.3 km	MPC · JPL
365200	2009 FN_{65}	—	March 18, 2009	Mount Lemmon	Mount Lemmon Survey	·	1.2 km	MPC · JPL

== 365201–365300 ==
back to top

Designation			Discovery			Properties		Ref
Permanent	Provisional	Named after	Date	Site	Discoverer(s)	Category	Diam.	Ref
365201	2009 FR_{74}	—	March 18, 2009	Socorro	LINEAR	V	850 m	MPC · JPL
365202	2009 FB_{76}	—	March 24, 2009	Mount Lemmon	Mount Lemmon Survey	V	760 m	MPC · JPL
365203	2009 GJ_{2}	—	April 1, 2009	Catalina	CSS	·	1.2 km	MPC · JPL
365204	2009 GK_{6}	—	April 2, 2009	Mount Lemmon	Mount Lemmon Survey	·	1.9 km	MPC · JPL
365205	2009 HZ_{1}	—	April 17, 2009	Catalina	CSS	·	1.5 km	MPC · JPL
365206	2009 HP_{3}	—	April 17, 2009	Kitt Peak	Spacewatch	V	710 m	MPC · JPL
365207	2009 HL_{4}	—	March 17, 2009	Kitt Peak	Spacewatch	·	930 m	MPC · JPL
365208	2009 HO_{4}	—	April 17, 2009	Kitt Peak	Spacewatch	·	1.1 km	MPC · JPL
365209	2009 HC_{8}	—	April 17, 2009	Kitt Peak	Spacewatch	·	1.3 km	MPC · JPL
365210	2009 HM_{12}	—	April 18, 2009	Piszkéstető	K. Sárneczky	MAS	740 m	MPC · JPL
365211	2009 HQ_{14}	—	April 18, 2009	Kitt Peak	Spacewatch	·	1.3 km	MPC · JPL
365212	2009 HX_{15}	—	April 18, 2009	Kitt Peak	Spacewatch	·	1.7 km	MPC · JPL
365213	2009 HL_{19}	—	April 19, 2009	Catalina	CSS	·	1.3 km	MPC · JPL
365214	2009 HZ_{20}	—	April 20, 2009	Kitt Peak	Spacewatch	NYS	1.3 km	MPC · JPL
365215	2009 HJ_{38}	—	April 18, 2009	Kitt Peak	Spacewatch	·	2.5 km	MPC · JPL
365216	2009 HM_{41}	—	April 20, 2009	Kitt Peak	Spacewatch	·	1.3 km	MPC · JPL
365217	2009 HP_{48}	—	April 19, 2009	Kitt Peak	Spacewatch	·	1.6 km	MPC · JPL
365218	2009 HC_{49}	—	April 19, 2009	Kitt Peak	Spacewatch	EUN	1.3 km	MPC · JPL
365219	2009 HN_{49}	—	April 20, 2009	Purple Mountain	PMO NEO Survey Program	HNS	1.3 km	MPC · JPL
365220	2009 HX_{80}	—	April 29, 2009	Mount Lemmon	Mount Lemmon Survey	·	1.2 km	MPC · JPL
365221	2009 HS_{81}	—	April 24, 2009	Cerro Burek	Burek, Cerro	·	1.2 km	MPC · JPL
365222	2009 HG_{84}	—	April 23, 2009	Kitt Peak	Spacewatch	·	1.7 km	MPC · JPL
365223	2009 HW_{84}	—	April 19, 2009	Kitt Peak	Spacewatch	PHO	1.3 km	MPC · JPL
365224	2009 HC_{88}	—	April 28, 2009	Catalina	CSS	·	2.3 km	MPC · JPL
365225	2009 HC_{90}	—	April 18, 2009	Mount Lemmon	Mount Lemmon Survey	MAS	820 m	MPC · JPL
365226	2009 HO_{91}	—	April 27, 2009	Purple Mountain	PMO NEO Survey Program	·	1.1 km	MPC · JPL
365227	2009 HJ_{92}	—	April 29, 2009	Kitt Peak	Spacewatch	·	1.5 km	MPC · JPL
365228	2009 HH_{96}	—	April 22, 2009	Mount Lemmon	Mount Lemmon Survey	PHO	1.1 km	MPC · JPL
365229	2009 HG_{99}	—	April 17, 2009	Kitt Peak	Spacewatch	·	1.7 km	MPC · JPL
365230	2009 HU_{103}	—	April 19, 2009	Siding Spring	SSS	·	2.0 km	MPC · JPL
365231	2009 HK_{104}	—	April 27, 2009	Kitt Peak	Spacewatch	(5)	1.3 km	MPC · JPL
365232	2009 HV_{104}	—	April 20, 2009	Kitt Peak	Spacewatch	·	1.2 km	MPC · JPL
365233	2009 HY_{104}	—	April 17, 2009	Kitt Peak	Spacewatch	(5)	1.3 km	MPC · JPL
365234	2009 HO_{106}	—	April 26, 2009	Siding Spring	SSS	·	1.5 km	MPC · JPL
365235	2009 JZ_{6}	—	April 20, 2009	XuYi	PMO NEO Survey Program	·	1.2 km	MPC · JPL
365236	2009 JL_{14}	—	June 27, 2001	Palomar	NEAT	·	1.8 km	MPC · JPL
365237	2009 JW_{16}	—	May 14, 2009	Kitt Peak	Spacewatch	·	1.1 km	MPC · JPL
365238	2009 JR_{17}	—	May 1, 2009	Mount Lemmon	Mount Lemmon Survey	·	1.2 km	MPC · JPL
365239	2009 KN_{8}	—	March 15, 2004	Kitt Peak	Spacewatch	·	1.5 km	MPC · JPL
365240	2009 KK_{22}	—	May 31, 2009	Bisei SG Center	BATTeRS	BAR	1.6 km	MPC · JPL
365241	2009 LV_{4}	—	October 16, 2006	Catalina	CSS	·	2.1 km	MPC · JPL
365242	2009 MR_{4}	—	June 21, 2009	Kitt Peak	Spacewatch	·	1.6 km	MPC · JPL
365243	2009 MV_{7}	—	June 25, 2009	Tzec Maun	E. Schwab	EUN	1.5 km	MPC · JPL
365244	2009 MB_{8}	—	June 27, 2009	La Sagra	OAM	JUN	1.0 km	MPC · JPL
365245	2009 MW_{9}	—	June 23, 2009	Mount Lemmon	Mount Lemmon Survey	·	1.1 km	MPC · JPL
365246	2009 NE	—	July 2, 2009	Socorro	LINEAR	T_{j} (2.53) · APO +1km	2.4 km	MPC · JPL
365247	2009 NU	—	July 14, 2009	La Sagra	OAM	·	1.8 km	MPC · JPL
365248	2009 OL	—	October 5, 2005	Catalina	CSS	·	2.8 km	MPC · JPL
365249	2009 OQ_{6}	—	July 26, 2009	La Sagra	OAM	·	2.3 km	MPC · JPL
365250 Vladimirsurdin	2009 OF_{7}	Vladimirsurdin	July 26, 2009	Zelenchukskaya Stn	T. V. Krjačko	·	2.5 km	MPC · JPL
365251	2009 OU_{9}	—	July 28, 2009	Hibiscus	Teamo, N.	·	3.7 km	MPC · JPL
365252	2009 OF_{16}	—	July 28, 2009	Kitt Peak	Spacewatch	·	2.0 km	MPC · JPL
365253	2009 OH_{16}	—	July 28, 2009	Kitt Peak	Spacewatch	·	2.0 km	MPC · JPL
365254	2009 OM_{17}	—	July 28, 2009	Kitt Peak	Spacewatch	·	1.5 km	MPC · JPL
365255	2009 OX_{21}	—	July 29, 2009	Kitt Peak	Spacewatch	·	2.1 km	MPC · JPL
365256	2009 OT_{25}	—	May 13, 2008	Kitt Peak	Spacewatch	·	2.0 km	MPC · JPL
365257	2009 PT	—	August 13, 2009	Dauban	Kugel, F.	·	4.0 km	MPC · JPL
365258	2009 PH_{3}	—	August 12, 2009	La Sagra	OAM	JUN	1.0 km	MPC · JPL
365259	2009 PB_{8}	—	July 29, 2009	Kitt Peak	Spacewatch	·	3.7 km	MPC · JPL
365260	2009 PK_{8}	—	August 15, 2009	Catalina	CSS	·	3.9 km	MPC · JPL
365261	2009 PO_{9}	—	August 15, 2009	Kitt Peak	Spacewatch	·	3.6 km	MPC · JPL
365262	2009 PN_{21}	—	August 18, 2003	Haleakala	NEAT	·	4.2 km	MPC · JPL
365263	2009 QY	—	August 16, 2009	Marly	P. Kocher	·	2.3 km	MPC · JPL
365264	2009 QQ_{4}	—	August 16, 2009	La Sagra	OAM	·	2.7 km	MPC · JPL
365265	2009 QW_{4}	—	August 16, 2009	La Sagra	OAM	·	2.0 km	MPC · JPL
365266	2009 QX_{10}	—	August 18, 2009	Kitt Peak	Spacewatch	THM	2.9 km	MPC · JPL
365267	2009 QG_{11}	—	August 20, 2009	Črni Vrh	Mikuž, B.	·	2.4 km	MPC · JPL
365268	2009 QE_{13}	—	August 16, 2009	Kitt Peak	Spacewatch	·	3.1 km	MPC · JPL
365269	2009 QG_{13}	—	August 16, 2009	Kitt Peak	Spacewatch	TIN	1.1 km	MPC · JPL
365270	2009 QJ_{22}	—	August 20, 2009	La Sagra	OAM	·	2.9 km	MPC · JPL
365271	2009 QH_{27}	—	August 23, 2009	Dauban	Kugel, F.	·	3.1 km	MPC · JPL
365272	2009 QD_{28}	—	April 4, 2008	Mount Lemmon	Mount Lemmon Survey	BRA	2.0 km	MPC · JPL
365273	2009 QY_{29}	—	August 23, 2009	Hibiscus	Teamo, N.	·	2.1 km	MPC · JPL
365274	2009 QV_{36}	—	August 30, 2009	Taunus	Karge, S., R. Kling	·	2.3 km	MPC · JPL
365275	2009 QE_{37}	—	August 28, 2009	Catalina	CSS	EUP	4.9 km	MPC · JPL
365276	2009 QP_{42}	—	August 26, 2009	La Sagra	OAM	·	3.3 km	MPC · JPL
365277	2009 QT_{42}	—	August 26, 2009	La Sagra	OAM	·	3.3 km	MPC · JPL
365278	2009 QV_{46}	—	August 27, 2009	La Sagra	OAM	·	1.7 km	MPC · JPL
365279	2009 QJ_{48}	—	August 26, 2009	Catalina	CSS	MRX	1.3 km	MPC · JPL
365280	2009 QG_{53}	—	August 16, 2009	Kitt Peak	Spacewatch	·	2.7 km	MPC · JPL
365281	2009 QM_{55}	—	August 16, 2009	Kitt Peak	Spacewatch	·	2.6 km	MPC · JPL
365282	2009 QQ_{55}	—	August 20, 2009	Kitt Peak	Spacewatch	EOS	2.0 km	MPC · JPL
365283	2009 QQ_{56}	—	August 27, 2009	Kitt Peak	Spacewatch	·	2.9 km	MPC · JPL
365284	2009 QM_{62}	—	October 12, 2004	Kitt Peak	Spacewatch	·	2.1 km	MPC · JPL
365285	2009 RU_{6}	—	September 10, 2009	Catalina	CSS	LIX	4.4 km	MPC · JPL
365286	2009 RB_{10}	—	September 12, 2009	Kitt Peak	Spacewatch	·	3.3 km	MPC · JPL
365287	2009 RS_{16}	—	September 12, 2009	Kitt Peak	Spacewatch	·	3.1 km	MPC · JPL
365288	2009 RT_{17}	—	September 12, 2009	Kitt Peak	Spacewatch	EOS	2.2 km	MPC · JPL
365289	2009 RD_{18}	—	September 12, 2009	Kitt Peak	Spacewatch	·	3.3 km	MPC · JPL
365290	2009 RK_{22}	—	September 15, 2009	Kitt Peak	Spacewatch	DOR	2.9 km	MPC · JPL
365291	2009 RO_{26}	—	September 13, 2009	ESA OGS	ESA OGS	(22805)	3.8 km	MPC · JPL
365292	2009 RS_{27}	—	September 11, 2009	Catalina	CSS	·	4.1 km	MPC · JPL
365293	2009 RD_{33}	—	August 23, 2003	Palomar	NEAT	·	2.7 km	MPC · JPL
365294	2009 RQ_{38}	—	September 15, 2009	Kitt Peak	Spacewatch	·	3.4 km	MPC · JPL
365295	2009 RJ_{46}	—	September 15, 2009	Kitt Peak	Spacewatch	·	4.5 km	MPC · JPL
365296	2009 RC_{48}	—	September 15, 2009	Kitt Peak	Spacewatch	·	3.7 km	MPC · JPL
365297	2009 RM_{48}	—	September 15, 2009	Kitt Peak	Spacewatch	THM	2.5 km	MPC · JPL
365298	2009 RF_{50}	—	September 15, 2009	Kitt Peak	Spacewatch	·	2.6 km	MPC · JPL
365299	2009 RN_{51}	—	September 15, 2009	Kitt Peak	Spacewatch	·	2.8 km	MPC · JPL
365300	2009 RK_{52}	—	September 15, 2009	Kitt Peak	Spacewatch	EOS	1.7 km	MPC · JPL

== 365301–365400 ==
back to top

Designation			Discovery			Properties		Ref
Permanent	Provisional	Named after	Date	Site	Discoverer(s)	Category	Diam.	Ref
365301	2009 RC_{63}	—	September 12, 2009	Kitt Peak	Spacewatch	L4	7.8 km	MPC · JPL
365302	2009 RH_{63}	—	September 14, 2009	La Sagra	OAM	·	3.4 km	MPC · JPL
365303	2009 RT_{68}	—	September 15, 2009	Kitt Peak	Spacewatch	·	2.5 km	MPC · JPL
365304	2009 RE_{69}	—	September 15, 2009	Kitt Peak	Spacewatch	·	4.1 km	MPC · JPL
365305	2009 RV_{71}	—	September 15, 2009	Kitt Peak	Spacewatch	·	2.4 km	MPC · JPL
365306	2009 RC_{74}	—	September 15, 2009	Kitt Peak	Spacewatch	·	3.3 km	MPC · JPL
365307	2009 SS_{8}	—	September 16, 2009	Mount Lemmon	Mount Lemmon Survey	·	1.9 km	MPC · JPL
365308	2009 SR_{12}	—	September 16, 2009	Mount Lemmon	Mount Lemmon Survey	·	3.6 km	MPC · JPL
365309	2009 SR_{20}	—	September 21, 2009	Črni Vrh	Mikuž, B.	·	3.8 km	MPC · JPL
365310	2009 SO_{25}	—	September 16, 2009	Kitt Peak	Spacewatch	·	3.4 km	MPC · JPL
365311	2009 SX_{25}	—	September 16, 2009	Kitt Peak	Spacewatch	·	2.0 km	MPC · JPL
365312	2009 SW_{29}	—	September 16, 2009	Kitt Peak	Spacewatch	·	2.4 km	MPC · JPL
365313	2009 SC_{35}	—	September 16, 2009	Kitt Peak	Spacewatch	CYB	4.0 km	MPC · JPL
365314	2009 SP_{55}	—	September 17, 2009	Kitt Peak	Spacewatch	·	4.8 km	MPC · JPL
365315	2009 SM_{69}	—	September 17, 2009	Kitt Peak	Spacewatch	·	2.9 km	MPC · JPL
365316	2009 SC_{70}	—	September 17, 2009	Mount Lemmon	Mount Lemmon Survey	·	2.8 km	MPC · JPL
365317	2009 SE_{73}	—	August 15, 2009	Kitt Peak	Spacewatch	·	2.8 km	MPC · JPL
365318	2009 SC_{79}	—	September 18, 2009	Kitt Peak	Spacewatch	·	2.1 km	MPC · JPL
365319	2009 SW_{99}	—	September 21, 2009	La Sagra	OAM	·	2.9 km	MPC · JPL
365320	2009 SN_{110}	—	September 17, 2009	Catalina	CSS	·	2.6 km	MPC · JPL
365321	2009 SQ_{113}	—	September 18, 2009	Kitt Peak	Spacewatch	·	2.9 km	MPC · JPL
365322	2009 SF_{120}	—	July 3, 2003	Kitt Peak	Spacewatch	·	2.5 km	MPC · JPL
365323	2009 SB_{122}	—	September 18, 2009	Kitt Peak	Spacewatch	·	2.8 km	MPC · JPL
365324	2009 SG_{125}	—	September 18, 2009	Kitt Peak	Spacewatch	VER	3.5 km	MPC · JPL
365325	2009 SD_{131}	—	September 18, 2009	Kitt Peak	Spacewatch	·	2.2 km	MPC · JPL
365326	2009 SY_{137}	—	September 18, 2009	Kitt Peak	Spacewatch	HYG	3.6 km	MPC · JPL
365327	2009 SM_{141}	—	September 19, 2009	Kitt Peak	Spacewatch	CYB	4.2 km	MPC · JPL
365328	2009 SL_{146}	—	September 19, 2009	Kitt Peak	Spacewatch	·	2.8 km	MPC · JPL
365329	2009 SP_{161}	—	September 21, 2009	Catalina	CSS	·	2.0 km	MPC · JPL
365330	2009 SX_{164}	—	September 21, 2009	Kitt Peak	Spacewatch	·	2.8 km	MPC · JPL
365331	2009 ST_{180}	—	September 21, 2009	Catalina	CSS	·	2.5 km	MPC · JPL
365332	2009 SA_{181}	—	August 27, 2009	Kitt Peak	Spacewatch	VER	2.9 km	MPC · JPL
365333	2009 SY_{188}	—	September 21, 2009	La Sagra	OAM	·	3.5 km	MPC · JPL
365334	2009 SJ_{201}	—	December 11, 2005	La Silla	Behrend, R.	MRX	970 m	MPC · JPL
365335	2009 SO_{209}	—	September 23, 2009	Kitt Peak	Spacewatch	EOS	2.0 km	MPC · JPL
365336	2009 SB_{216}	—	September 24, 2009	Kitt Peak	Spacewatch	·	2.9 km	MPC · JPL
365337	2009 SM_{217}	—	September 24, 2009	Kitt Peak	Spacewatch	·	2.7 km	MPC · JPL
365338	2009 SP_{217}	—	September 24, 2009	Kitt Peak	Spacewatch	·	3.6 km	MPC · JPL
365339	2009 SQ_{224}	—	September 25, 2009	Mount Lemmon	Mount Lemmon Survey	EOS	2.5 km	MPC · JPL
365340	2009 SB_{227}	—	September 26, 2009	Mount Lemmon	Mount Lemmon Survey	·	2.8 km	MPC · JPL
365341	2009 SH_{240}	—	August 17, 2009	Catalina	CSS	·	3.0 km	MPC · JPL
365342	2009 SR_{243}	—	September 25, 2009	La Sagra	OAM	·	1.9 km	MPC · JPL
365343	2009 SA_{255}	—	September 16, 2009	Siding Spring	SSS	·	2.0 km	MPC · JPL
365344	2009 SM_{255}	—	September 16, 2009	Siding Spring	SSS	BAR	1.7 km	MPC · JPL
365345	2009 SS_{263}	—	September 23, 2009	Mount Lemmon	Mount Lemmon Survey	ELF	3.4 km	MPC · JPL
365346	2009 SN_{270}	—	February 17, 2007	Kitt Peak	Spacewatch	·	2.2 km	MPC · JPL
365347	2009 SQ_{274}	—	September 25, 2009	Kitt Peak	Spacewatch	·	1.9 km	MPC · JPL
365348	2009 SR_{274}	—	September 25, 2009	Kitt Peak	Spacewatch	·	2.7 km	MPC · JPL
365349	2009 SW_{276}	—	September 25, 2009	Kitt Peak	Spacewatch	·	2.9 km	MPC · JPL
365350	2009 SK_{279}	—	April 17, 1996	La Silla	E. W. Elst	·	3.7 km	MPC · JPL
365351	2009 SL_{282}	—	September 17, 2009	Kitt Peak	Spacewatch	·	2.9 km	MPC · JPL
365352	2009 ST_{282}	—	March 15, 2007	Mount Lemmon	Mount Lemmon Survey	·	3.4 km	MPC · JPL
365353	2009 SX_{311}	—	August 16, 2009	Kitt Peak	Spacewatch	·	1.8 km	MPC · JPL
365354	2009 SK_{328}	—	September 26, 2009	Kitt Peak	Spacewatch	·	3.3 km	MPC · JPL
365355	2009 SO_{328}	—	September 29, 2009	Kitt Peak	Spacewatch	·	3.0 km	MPC · JPL
365356	2009 SJ_{330}	—	September 18, 2009	Catalina	CSS	·	4.4 km	MPC · JPL
365357	2009 SQ_{330}	—	August 15, 2009	Kitt Peak	Spacewatch	·	3.8 km	MPC · JPL
365358	2009 SH_{332}	—	September 21, 2009	Catalina	CSS	·	3.5 km	MPC · JPL
365359	2009 SL_{334}	—	September 21, 2009	Catalina	CSS	·	3.9 km	MPC · JPL
365360	2009 SE_{340}	—	September 16, 2009	Catalina	CSS	·	4.5 km	MPC · JPL
365361	2009 SD_{352}	—	September 16, 2009	Catalina	CSS	·	3.3 km	MPC · JPL
365362	2009 SD_{360}	—	September 27, 2009	Kitt Peak	Spacewatch	·	2.8 km	MPC · JPL
365363	2009 TK_{3}	—	October 11, 2009	La Sagra	OAM	·	3.1 km	MPC · JPL
365364	2009 TM_{13}	—	October 15, 2009	Bisei SG Center	BATTeRS	EOS	2.0 km	MPC · JPL
365365	2009 TL_{21}	—	October 12, 2009	La Sagra	OAM	·	2.7 km	MPC · JPL
365366	2009 TU_{23}	—	October 14, 2009	Kitt Peak	Spacewatch	THM	2.4 km	MPC · JPL
365367	2009 TA_{30}	—	October 15, 2009	Catalina	CSS	·	4.3 km	MPC · JPL
365368	2009 TE_{31}	—	October 15, 2009	Mount Lemmon	Mount Lemmon Survey	·	3.6 km	MPC · JPL
365369	2009 TF_{34}	—	October 11, 2009	La Sagra	OAM	·	4.8 km	MPC · JPL
365370	2009 TD_{36}	—	October 14, 2009	Catalina	CSS	(1547)	1.9 km	MPC · JPL
365371	2009 TU_{36}	—	October 15, 2009	Catalina	CSS	·	2.6 km	MPC · JPL
365372	2009 TR_{37}	—	July 3, 2003	Kitt Peak	Spacewatch	EOS	2.2 km	MPC · JPL
365373	2009 TE_{42}	—	October 15, 2009	La Sagra	OAM	·	4.5 km	MPC · JPL
365374	2009 TJ_{43}	—	October 2, 2009	Mount Lemmon	Mount Lemmon Survey	VER	3.0 km	MPC · JPL
365375 Serebrov	2009 UZ_{3}	Serebrov	October 19, 2009	Zelenchukskaya Stn118221	T. V. Krjačko	·	4.4 km	MPC · JPL
365376	2009 UZ_{43}	—	October 18, 2009	Mount Lemmon	Mount Lemmon Survey	TIR	3.3 km	MPC · JPL
365377	2009 UM_{47}	—	October 18, 2009	Kitt Peak	Spacewatch	·	3.8 km	MPC · JPL
365378	2009 UZ_{95}	—	October 22, 2009	Catalina	CSS	·	3.5 km	MPC · JPL
365379	2009 UG_{130}	—	October 15, 2009	Catalina	CSS	VER	2.8 km	MPC · JPL
365380	2009 UX_{132}	—	October 22, 2009	Catalina	CSS	·	5.4 km	MPC · JPL
365381	2009 UD_{134}	—	October 22, 2009	Catalina	CSS	URS	4.3 km	MPC · JPL
365382	2009 UT_{134}	—	October 23, 2009	Kitt Peak	Spacewatch	·	2.6 km	MPC · JPL
365383	2009 UX_{141}	—	October 16, 2009	Catalina	CSS	·	4.5 km	MPC · JPL
365384	2009 VL_{23}	—	November 9, 2009	Catalina	CSS	·	3.2 km	MPC · JPL
365385	2009 VL_{42}	—	November 12, 2009	Hibiscus	Teamo, N.	·	3.7 km	MPC · JPL
365386	2009 VC_{51}	—	November 15, 2009	Catalina	CSS	·	6.0 km	MPC · JPL
365387	2009 VM_{61}	—	November 8, 2009	Kitt Peak	Spacewatch	·	2.4 km	MPC · JPL
365388	2009 VY_{63}	—	May 18, 2002	Palomar	NEAT	·	3.0 km	MPC · JPL
365389	2009 VX_{79}	—	November 10, 2009	Catalina	CSS	·	5.4 km	MPC · JPL
365390	2009 VC_{85}	—	December 19, 2004	Kitt Peak	Spacewatch	·	3.4 km	MPC · JPL
365391	2009 VM_{104}	—	November 8, 2009	Catalina	CSS	·	4.7 km	MPC · JPL
365392	2009 VH_{105}	—	November 10, 2009	Catalina	CSS	EUP	5.2 km	MPC · JPL
365393	2009 VM_{108}	—	November 9, 2009	Catalina	CSS	·	5.5 km	MPC · JPL
365394	2009 WO_{44}	—	November 18, 2009	Kitt Peak	Spacewatch	CYB	5.3 km	MPC · JPL
365395	2009 WM_{47}	—	November 19, 2009	Kitt Peak	Spacewatch	·	5.3 km	MPC · JPL
365396	2009 WH_{49}	—	September 27, 2003	Apache Point	SDSS	VER	3.3 km	MPC · JPL
365397	2009 WP_{54}	—	November 16, 2009	Mount Lemmon	Mount Lemmon Survey	·	2.5 km	MPC · JPL
365398	2009 WT_{62}	—	November 16, 2009	Mount Lemmon	Mount Lemmon Survey	·	5.3 km	MPC · JPL
365399	2009 WV_{63}	—	November 16, 2009	Mount Lemmon	Mount Lemmon Survey	URS	4.3 km	MPC · JPL
365400	2009 WG_{119}	—	April 14, 2007	Mount Lemmon	Mount Lemmon Survey	THM	2.4 km	MPC · JPL

== 365401–365500 ==
back to top

Designation			Discovery			Properties		Ref
Permanent	Provisional	Named after	Date	Site	Discoverer(s)	Category	Diam.	Ref
365401	2009 WZ_{199}	—	November 26, 2009	Mount Lemmon	Mount Lemmon Survey	CYB	5.8 km	MPC · JPL
365402	2009 WP_{253}	—	November 16, 2009	Mount Lemmon	Mount Lemmon Survey	·	6.1 km	MPC · JPL
365403	2009 WD_{261}	—	November 17, 2009	Socorro	LINEAR	·	3.7 km	MPC · JPL
365404	2009 XD_{22}	—	December 15, 2009	Catalina	CSS	T_{j} (2.97)	5.9 km	MPC · JPL
365405	2009 YC_{12}	—	December 18, 2009	Mount Lemmon	Mount Lemmon Survey	·	6.1 km	MPC · JPL
365406	2010 AE_{4}	—	January 10, 2010	Catalina	CSS	H	690 m	MPC · JPL
365407	2010 AX_{79}	—	January 12, 2010	Catalina	CSS	H	700 m	MPC · JPL
365408	2010 AD_{88}	—	September 22, 2009	Kitt Peak	Spacewatch	·	5.2 km	MPC · JPL
365409	2010 AX_{100}	—	April 25, 2007	Mount Lemmon	Mount Lemmon Survey	ULA · CYB	5.8 km	MPC · JPL
365410	2010 DC_{41}	—	February 17, 2010	Kitt Peak	Spacewatch	·	1.6 km	MPC · JPL
365411	2010 ET_{111}	—	March 12, 2010	Kitt Peak	Spacewatch	·	1.5 km	MPC · JPL
365412	2010 EA_{137}	—	June 26, 1997	Kitt Peak	Spacewatch	·	2.5 km	MPC · JPL
365413	2010 FA	—	February 19, 2010	Catalina	CSS	H	680 m	MPC · JPL
365414	2010 FE_{5}	—	March 16, 2010	Mount Lemmon	Mount Lemmon Survey	H	620 m	MPC · JPL
365415	2010 FY_{21}	—	February 18, 2010	Mount Lemmon	Mount Lemmon Survey	H	620 m	MPC · JPL
365416	2010 FM_{31}	—	November 25, 2009	Catalina	CSS	H	860 m	MPC · JPL
365417	2010 FM_{84}	—	March 25, 2010	Mount Lemmon	Mount Lemmon Survey	H	500 m	MPC · JPL
365418	2010 FC_{92}	—	March 17, 2010	Catalina	CSS	H	820 m	MPC · JPL
365419	2010 GW_{90}	—	October 26, 2008	Kitt Peak	Spacewatch	·	5.4 km	MPC · JPL
365420	2010 HQ_{35}	—	April 20, 2010	WISE	WISE	·	1.2 km	MPC · JPL
365421	2010 JP_{17}	—	May 3, 2010	WISE	WISE	PHO	2.6 km	MPC · JPL
365422	2010 JX_{108}	—	May 12, 2010	WISE	WISE	·	5.0 km	MPC · JPL
365423	2010 JZ_{131}	—	October 16, 2007	Catalina	CSS	·	1.9 km	MPC · JPL
365424	2010 KX_{7}	—	May 16, 2010	WISE	WISE	ATE · PHA · critical	210 m	MPC · JPL
365425	2010 KP_{53}	—	May 23, 2010	WISE	WISE	·	1.5 km	MPC · JPL
365426	2010 KC_{61}	—	October 16, 1977	Palomar	C. J. van Houten, I. van Houten-Groeneveld, T. Gehrels	·	800 m	MPC · JPL
365427	2010 KD_{109}	—	May 29, 2010	WISE	WISE	DOR	3.4 km	MPC · JPL
365428	2010 LJ_{9}	—	September 16, 2003	Kitt Peak	Spacewatch	·	3.4 km	MPC · JPL
365429	2010 LF_{32}	—	June 6, 2010	WISE	WISE	·	4.5 km	MPC · JPL
365430	2010 LK_{41}	—	June 7, 2010	WISE	WISE	·	2.7 km	MPC · JPL
365431	2010 LO_{51}	—	June 8, 2010	WISE	WISE	PHO	1.1 km	MPC · JPL
365432	2010 LQ_{52}	—	June 8, 2010	WISE	WISE	·	2.4 km	MPC · JPL
365433	2010 LS_{90}	—	June 12, 2010	WISE	WISE	·	3.1 km	MPC · JPL
365434	2010 LX_{102}	—	June 13, 2010	WISE	WISE	·	1.4 km	MPC · JPL
365435	2010 LA_{104}	—	June 13, 2010	Socorro	LINEAR	·	750 m	MPC · JPL
365436	2010 LZ_{110}	—	June 14, 2010	Mount Lemmon	Mount Lemmon Survey	·	520 m	MPC · JPL
365437	2010 LV_{120}	—	June 14, 2010	WISE	WISE	ERI	1.7 km	MPC · JPL
365438	2010 LA_{124}	—	August 30, 2006	Anderson Mesa	LONEOS	·	2.2 km	MPC · JPL
365439	2010 LQ_{127}	—	June 15, 2010	WISE	WISE	·	990 m	MPC · JPL
365440	2010 LT_{130}	—	June 15, 2010	WISE	WISE	·	4.0 km	MPC · JPL
365441	2010 MF_{38}	—	September 26, 2006	Mount Lemmon	Mount Lemmon Survey	·	2.1 km	MPC · JPL
365442	2010 MF_{48}	—	June 23, 2010	WISE	WISE	·	2.7 km	MPC · JPL
365443 Holiday	2010 MU_{49}	Holiday	June 23, 2010	WISE	WISE	·	2.1 km	MPC · JPL
365444	2010 MK_{61}	—	September 28, 2003	Kitt Peak	Spacewatch	ERI	1.5 km	MPC · JPL
365445	2010 MG_{62}	—	June 24, 2010	WISE	WISE	·	3.3 km	MPC · JPL
365446	2010 ML_{74}	—	October 3, 1999	Catalina	CSS	·	2.2 km	MPC · JPL
365447	2010 MY_{105}	—	June 30, 2010	WISE	WISE	·	1.5 km	MPC · JPL
365448	2010 MP_{115}	—	September 11, 2004	Kitt Peak	Spacewatch	·	4.4 km	MPC · JPL
365449	2010 NJ_{1}	—	July 3, 2010	WISE	WISE	ATE	220 m	MPC · JPL
365450	2010 NA_{4}	—	July 4, 2010	Kitt Peak	Spacewatch	V	760 m	MPC · JPL
365451	2010 NV_{5}	—	May 20, 2005	Palomar	NEAT	HNS	1.6 km	MPC · JPL
365452	2010 NZ_{23}	—	May 30, 2006	Mount Lemmon	Mount Lemmon Survey	·	1.4 km	MPC · JPL
365453	2010 NK_{27}	—	October 6, 1999	Socorro	LINEAR	LIX	3.5 km	MPC · JPL
365454	2010 NS_{41}	—	November 20, 2006	Kitt Peak	Spacewatch	·	2.4 km	MPC · JPL
365455	2010 NA_{56}	—	July 10, 2010	WISE	WISE	·	1.2 km	MPC · JPL
365456	2010 NX_{66}	—	January 28, 2010	WISE	WISE	URS	4.7 km	MPC · JPL
365457	2010 NB_{75}	—	November 19, 2003	Kitt Peak	Spacewatch	·	1.4 km	MPC · JPL
365458	2010 NC_{87}	—	July 1, 2010	WISE	WISE	·	2.8 km	MPC · JPL
365459	2010 NS_{88}	—	July 2, 2010	WISE	WISE	LIX	4.0 km	MPC · JPL
365460	2010 NM_{89}	—	July 5, 2010	WISE	WISE	·	1.2 km	MPC · JPL
365461	2010 NT_{106}	—	August 26, 2005	Anderson Mesa	LONEOS	(32418)	1.8 km	MPC · JPL
365462	2010 OX_{18}	—	November 4, 1999	Socorro	LINEAR	·	3.0 km	MPC · JPL
365463	2010 OU_{22}	—	October 4, 2006	Mount Lemmon	Mount Lemmon Survey	·	1.4 km	MPC · JPL
365464	2010 OK_{23}	—	August 23, 2001	Anderson Mesa	LONEOS	EUN	1.6 km	MPC · JPL
365465	2010 OP_{36}	—	September 12, 2001	Socorro	LINEAR	·	2.5 km	MPC · JPL
365466	2010 OU_{36}	—	July 21, 2010	WISE	WISE	·	3.2 km	MPC · JPL
365467	2010 OP_{68}	—	July 25, 2010	WISE	WISE	·	3.0 km	MPC · JPL
365468	2010 OB_{88}	—	July 27, 2010	WISE	WISE	·	4.9 km	MPC · JPL
365469	2010 OM_{95}	—	March 17, 2002	Kitt Peak	Spacewatch	·	4.3 km	MPC · JPL
365470	2010 PS_{8}	—	August 3, 2010	Socorro	LINEAR	·	830 m	MPC · JPL
365471	2010 PX_{9}	—	August 4, 2010	Socorro	LINEAR	·	700 m	MPC · JPL
365472	2010 PL_{17}	—	January 24, 1998	Kitt Peak	Spacewatch	PHO	1.9 km	MPC · JPL
365473	2010 PF_{23}	—	August 3, 2010	Socorro	LINEAR	·	900 m	MPC · JPL
365474	2010 PX_{23}	—	August 3, 2010	La Sagra	OAM	·	940 m	MPC · JPL
365475	2010 PF_{26}	—	December 8, 1998	Kitt Peak	Spacewatch	L4	10 km	MPC · JPL
365476	2010 PT_{27}	—	September 12, 2004	Socorro	LINEAR	·	6.2 km	MPC · JPL
365477	2010 PO_{30}	—	August 19, 2002	Palomar	NEAT	·	2.1 km	MPC · JPL
365478	2010 PU_{32}	—	March 23, 2007	Siding Spring	SSS	·	5.7 km	MPC · JPL
365479	2010 PX_{39}	—	August 29, 2005	Kitt Peak	Spacewatch	·	2.7 km	MPC · JPL
365480	2010 PE_{41}	—	August 6, 2010	WISE	WISE	·	6.3 km	MPC · JPL
365481	2010 PN_{41}	—	March 6, 2008	Mount Lemmon	Mount Lemmon Survey	·	1.8 km	MPC · JPL
365482	2010 PQ_{42}	—	August 6, 2010	WISE	WISE	·	3.8 km	MPC · JPL
365483	2010 PD_{48}	—	September 10, 2001	Socorro	LINEAR	JUN	1.4 km	MPC · JPL
365484	2010 PM_{63}	—	August 13, 2010	Socorro	LINEAR	·	1.4 km	MPC · JPL
365485	2010 PA_{64}	—	August 8, 2010	La Sagra	OAM	·	830 m	MPC · JPL
365486	2010 PV_{73}	—	August 9, 2010	XuYi	PMO NEO Survey Program	PHO	1.2 km	MPC · JPL
365487	2010 PG_{76}	—	August 11, 2010	La Sagra	OAM	NYS	1.2 km	MPC · JPL
365488	2010 PM_{76}	—	August 2, 2010	La Sagra	OAM	·	810 m	MPC · JPL
365489	2010 PF_{77}	—	April 30, 2006	Kitt Peak	Spacewatch	·	750 m	MPC · JPL
365490	2010 PX_{78}	—	August 2, 2010	La Sagra	OAM	·	1.3 km	MPC · JPL
365491	2010 PD_{79}	—	August 10, 2010	Purple Mountain	PMO NEO Survey Program	NYS	1.3 km	MPC · JPL
365492	2010 QC	—	August 19, 2010	Kitt Peak	Spacewatch	·	1.3 km	MPC · JPL
365493	2010 QM_{4}	—	August 19, 2010	Sandlot	G. Hug	·	1.0 km	MPC · JPL
365494	2010 QO_{6}	—	September 21, 2003	Kitt Peak	Spacewatch	·	1.2 km	MPC · JPL
365495	2010 RB_{3}	—	September 1, 2010	Socorro	LINEAR	·	900 m	MPC · JPL
365496	2010 RM_{3}	—	October 19, 2003	Kitt Peak	Spacewatch	·	780 m	MPC · JPL
365497	2010 RE_{9}	—	November 16, 2003	Kitt Peak	Spacewatch	MAS	770 m	MPC · JPL
365498	2010 RN_{14}	—	September 1, 2010	Socorro	LINEAR	·	1.7 km	MPC · JPL
365499	2010 RK_{16}	—	September 19, 2003	Palomar	NEAT	·	1.1 km	MPC · JPL
365500	2010 RY_{54}	—	September 5, 2010	La Sagra	OAM	V	650 m	MPC · JPL

== 365501–365600 ==
back to top

Designation			Discovery			Properties		Ref
Permanent	Provisional	Named after	Date	Site	Discoverer(s)	Category	Diam.	Ref
365501	2010 RE_{59}	—	October 6, 1999	Socorro	LINEAR	·	1.3 km	MPC · JPL
365502	2010 RP_{60}	—	August 16, 2006	Palomar	NEAT	·	1.1 km	MPC · JPL
365503	2010 RJ_{62}	—	October 9, 1999	Kitt Peak	Spacewatch	·	1.1 km	MPC · JPL
365504	2010 RF_{63}	—	September 4, 2010	Kitt Peak	Spacewatch	·	1.4 km	MPC · JPL
365505	2010 RB_{68}	—	June 13, 2010	Mount Lemmon	Mount Lemmon Survey	·	1.6 km	MPC · JPL
365506	2010 RF_{69}	—	September 6, 2010	Socorro	LINEAR	·	980 m	MPC · JPL
365507	2010 RW_{71}	—	February 28, 2008	Mount Lemmon	Mount Lemmon Survey	·	2.2 km	MPC · JPL
365508	2010 RR_{82}	—	September 8, 2010	Socorro	LINEAR	EUN	1.8 km	MPC · JPL
365509	2010 RJ_{88}	—	September 17, 2006	Kitt Peak	Spacewatch	·	1.2 km	MPC · JPL
365510	2010 RX_{97}	—	September 10, 2010	Kitt Peak	Spacewatch	·	810 m	MPC · JPL
365511	2010 RB_{102}	—	September 10, 2010	Kitt Peak	Spacewatch	·	1.7 km	MPC · JPL
365512	2010 RB_{106}	—	March 10, 2005	Mount Lemmon	Mount Lemmon Survey	MAS	750 m	MPC · JPL
365513	2010 RB_{107}	—	November 16, 2003	Kitt Peak	Spacewatch	NYS	970 m	MPC · JPL
365514	2010 RL_{107}	—	September 10, 2010	Kitt Peak	Spacewatch	VER	3.4 km	MPC · JPL
365515	2010 RP_{114}	—	October 1, 2005	Mount Lemmon	Mount Lemmon Survey	·	2.3 km	MPC · JPL
365516	2010 RS_{117}	—	March 11, 2008	Mount Lemmon	Mount Lemmon Survey	·	2.1 km	MPC · JPL
365517	2010 RP_{118}	—	September 11, 2010	Kitt Peak	Spacewatch	·	1.8 km	MPC · JPL
365518	2010 RW_{118}	—	December 15, 2006	Kitt Peak	Spacewatch	·	2.2 km	MPC · JPL
365519	2010 RN_{121}	—	December 1, 2003	Kitt Peak	Spacewatch	·	1.7 km	MPC · JPL
365520	2010 RR_{123}	—	September 22, 2001	Socorro	LINEAR	·	1.7 km	MPC · JPL
365521	2010 RY_{124}	—	June 18, 2006	Kitt Peak	Spacewatch	·	1.0 km	MPC · JPL
365522	2010 RL_{126}	—	March 12, 2004	Palomar	NEAT	EUN	1.4 km	MPC · JPL
365523	2010 RA_{127}	—	November 1, 2005	Kitt Peak	Spacewatch	·	2.5 km	MPC · JPL
365524	2010 RM_{127}	—	September 12, 2010	Kitt Peak	Spacewatch	·	1.3 km	MPC · JPL
365525	2010 RW_{136}	—	August 12, 2006	Palomar	NEAT	·	1.1 km	MPC · JPL
365526	2010 RE_{142}	—	April 4, 2008	Catalina	CSS	·	2.0 km	MPC · JPL
365527	2010 RM_{142}	—	November 10, 1996	Kitt Peak	Spacewatch	·	1.9 km	MPC · JPL
365528	2010 RJ_{143}	—	June 20, 2006	Mount Lemmon	Mount Lemmon Survey	·	1.3 km	MPC · JPL
365529	2010 RK_{144}	—	October 20, 2006	Kitt Peak	Spacewatch	(5)	1.1 km	MPC · JPL
365530	2010 RJ_{145}	—	September 14, 2010	Kitt Peak	Spacewatch	·	2.5 km	MPC · JPL
365531	2010 RN_{145}	—	April 14, 1999	Kitt Peak	Spacewatch	·	650 m	MPC · JPL
365532	2010 RY_{148}	—	November 11, 1996	Kitt Peak	Spacewatch	·	820 m	MPC · JPL
365533	2010 RE_{160}	—	November 22, 2006	7300	W. K. Y. Yeung	AGN	1.0 km	MPC · JPL
365534	2010 RP_{163}	—	January 31, 2009	Kitt Peak	Spacewatch	·	1.4 km	MPC · JPL
365535	2010 RS_{175}	—	September 30, 2006	Mount Lemmon	Mount Lemmon Survey	·	1.6 km	MPC · JPL
365536	2010 SF_{1}	—	September 16, 2003	Kitt Peak	Spacewatch	·	620 m	MPC · JPL
365537	2010 SC_{3}	—	March 27, 2008	Mount Lemmon	Mount Lemmon Survey	·	2.1 km	MPC · JPL
365538	2010 SH_{10}	—	June 29, 2005	Kitt Peak	Spacewatch	·	1.6 km	MPC · JPL
365539	2010 SC_{12}	—	March 4, 2008	Mount Lemmon	Mount Lemmon Survey	·	2.0 km	MPC · JPL
365540	2010 SF_{17}	—	February 26, 2008	Mount Lemmon	Mount Lemmon Survey	·	1.9 km	MPC · JPL
365541	2010 SK_{25}	—	September 26, 2006	Mount Lemmon	Mount Lemmon Survey	·	1.0 km	MPC · JPL
365542	2010 SL_{29}	—	October 29, 2003	Kitt Peak	Spacewatch	·	1.1 km	MPC · JPL
365543	2010 SP_{29}	—	September 29, 2010	Mount Lemmon	Mount Lemmon Survey	·	1.1 km	MPC · JPL
365544	2010 SY_{33}	—	August 13, 2006	Palomar	NEAT	NYS	1.3 km	MPC · JPL
365545	2010 TD_{3}	—	October 11, 2005	Kitt Peak	Spacewatch	·	1.7 km	MPC · JPL
365546	2010 TG_{3}	—	August 30, 2005	Kitt Peak	Spacewatch	HOF	2.3 km	MPC · JPL
365547	2010 TH_{3}	—	December 6, 1999	Kitt Peak	Spacewatch	·	3.2 km	MPC · JPL
365548	2010 TP_{3}	—	October 29, 2005	Mount Lemmon	Mount Lemmon Survey	·	3.9 km	MPC · JPL
365549	2010 TE_{5}	—	August 28, 2006	Kitt Peak	Spacewatch	NYS	1.1 km	MPC · JPL
365550	2010 TJ_{5}	—	October 23, 2003	Kitt Peak	Spacewatch	·	1.1 km	MPC · JPL
365551	2010 TU_{6}	—	November 19, 2006	Kitt Peak	Spacewatch	·	1.5 km	MPC · JPL
365552	2010 TZ_{15}	—	October 21, 2007	Kitt Peak	Spacewatch	·	870 m	MPC · JPL
365553	2010 TL_{20}	—	September 21, 2001	Anderson Mesa	LONEOS	·	2.9 km	MPC · JPL
365554	2010 TM_{23}	—	March 26, 2008	Mount Lemmon	Mount Lemmon Survey	·	1.8 km	MPC · JPL
365555	2010 TH_{27}	—	September 25, 2006	Kitt Peak	Spacewatch	·	1.3 km	MPC · JPL
365556	2010 TT_{27}	—	August 31, 2005	Kitt Peak	Spacewatch	·	1.9 km	MPC · JPL
365557	2010 TC_{29}	—	November 19, 2006	Kitt Peak	Spacewatch	·	2.1 km	MPC · JPL
365558	2010 TO_{34}	—	September 17, 2010	Kitt Peak	Spacewatch	·	1.6 km	MPC · JPL
365559	2010 TQ_{34}	—	September 19, 2006	Kitt Peak	Spacewatch	·	1.5 km	MPC · JPL
365560	2010 TM_{38}	—	September 18, 2010	Mount Lemmon	Mount Lemmon Survey	·	2.1 km	MPC · JPL
365561	2010 TG_{40}	—	March 13, 2008	Mount Lemmon	Mount Lemmon Survey	·	1.5 km	MPC · JPL
365562	2010 TN_{40}	—	September 16, 2010	Kitt Peak	Spacewatch	NEM	2.1 km	MPC · JPL
365563	2010 TZ_{40}	—	February 25, 2007	Mount Lemmon	Mount Lemmon Survey	·	3.1 km	MPC · JPL
365564	2010 TD_{50}	—	October 21, 2006	Mount Lemmon	Mount Lemmon Survey	·	910 m	MPC · JPL
365565	2010 TA_{62}	—	December 25, 2006	Kitt Peak	Spacewatch	·	1.7 km	MPC · JPL
365566	2010 TZ_{62}	—	September 15, 2010	Kitt Peak	Spacewatch	·	900 m	MPC · JPL
365567	2010 TL_{68}	—	December 14, 2006	Kitt Peak	Spacewatch	·	1.5 km	MPC · JPL
365568	2010 TT_{85}	—	September 17, 2006	Kitt Peak	Spacewatch	·	1.0 km	MPC · JPL
365569	2010 TQ_{90}	—	February 19, 2009	Kitt Peak	Spacewatch	NYS	1.2 km	MPC · JPL
365570	2010 TO_{91}	—	September 17, 2010	Kitt Peak	Spacewatch	·	1.7 km	MPC · JPL
365571	2010 TC_{96}	—	May 11, 2002	Socorro	LINEAR	·	1.1 km	MPC · JPL
365572	2010 TV_{96}	—	July 3, 2005	Mount Lemmon	Mount Lemmon Survey	·	1.4 km	MPC · JPL
365573	2010 TR_{99}	—	September 16, 2010	Kitt Peak	Spacewatch	·	1.5 km	MPC · JPL
365574	2010 TB_{101}	—	October 3, 1999	Socorro	LINEAR	·	4.8 km	MPC · JPL
365575	2010 TA_{104}	—	February 20, 2009	Kitt Peak	Spacewatch	MAS	740 m	MPC · JPL
365576	2010 TU_{104}	—	November 25, 2005	Mount Lemmon	Mount Lemmon Survey	·	2.4 km	MPC · JPL
365577	2010 TS_{112}	—	May 28, 2009	Kitt Peak	Spacewatch	·	1.5 km	MPC · JPL
365578	2010 TG_{113}	—	September 25, 2003	Haleakala	NEAT	·	630 m	MPC · JPL
365579	2010 TE_{114}	—	March 13, 2008	Kitt Peak	Spacewatch	·	1.8 km	MPC · JPL
365580	2010 TF_{116}	—	October 16, 2006	Catalina	CSS	·	2.4 km	MPC · JPL
365581	2010 TO_{119}	—	October 30, 1997	Haleakala	NEAT	·	2.0 km	MPC · JPL
365582	2010 TH_{122}	—	August 21, 2006	Kitt Peak	Spacewatch	·	1.2 km	MPC · JPL
365583	2010 TM_{138}	—	February 28, 2008	Mount Lemmon	Mount Lemmon Survey	·	1.3 km	MPC · JPL
365584	2010 TP_{138}	—	March 8, 2008	Kitt Peak	Spacewatch	·	2.0 km	MPC · JPL
365585	2010 TQ_{138}	—	February 9, 2007	Mount Lemmon	Mount Lemmon Survey	·	1.9 km	MPC · JPL
365586	2010 TJ_{140}	—	November 16, 2006	Kitt Peak	Spacewatch	·	1.5 km	MPC · JPL
365587	2010 TW_{143}	—	August 27, 2005	Palomar	NEAT	·	2.2 km	MPC · JPL
365588	2010 TB_{147}	—	December 21, 2006	Kitt Peak	Spacewatch	·	1.7 km	MPC · JPL
365589	2010 TL_{148}	—	September 17, 2006	Kitt Peak	Spacewatch	·	1.1 km	MPC · JPL
365590	2010 TP_{148}	—	March 16, 2004	Kitt Peak	Spacewatch	·	1.5 km	MPC · JPL
365591	2010 TE_{150}	—	October 24, 2003	Kitt Peak	Spacewatch	·	940 m	MPC · JPL
365592	2010 TJ_{156}	—	February 27, 2009	Kitt Peak	Spacewatch	·	1.1 km	MPC · JPL
365593	2010 TS_{162}	—	September 27, 2005	Kitt Peak	Spacewatch	KOR	1.2 km	MPC · JPL
365594	2010 TC_{163}	—	October 12, 2010	Mount Lemmon	Mount Lemmon Survey	GEF	1.4 km	MPC · JPL
365595	2010 TM_{166}	—	November 18, 2006	Kitt Peak	Spacewatch	(5)	1.4 km	MPC · JPL
365596	2010 TQ_{166}	—	October 9, 2010	Socorro	LINEAR	·	2.3 km	MPC · JPL
365597	2010 TM_{168}	—	May 30, 2006	Mount Lemmon	Mount Lemmon Survey	·	1.6 km	MPC · JPL
365598	2010 TL_{170}	—	October 12, 2010	Črni Vrh	Zakrajšek, J.	EUP	3.9 km	MPC · JPL
365599	2010 TQ_{170}	—	October 24, 2001	Kitt Peak	Spacewatch	·	1.9 km	MPC · JPL
365600	2010 TM_{171}	—	October 22, 2005	Kitt Peak	Spacewatch	BRA	2.2 km	MPC · JPL

== 365601–365700 ==
back to top

Designation			Discovery			Properties		Ref
Permanent	Provisional	Named after	Date	Site	Discoverer(s)	Category	Diam.	Ref
365601	2010 TW_{171}	—	November 17, 2006	Mount Lemmon	Mount Lemmon Survey	·	1.5 km	MPC · JPL
365602	2010 TP_{173}	—	February 10, 2008	Kitt Peak	Spacewatch	·	1.7 km	MPC · JPL
365603	2010 TL_{174}	—	October 10, 2010	Plana	Fratev, F.	EOS	1.9 km	MPC · JPL
365604 Rusholme	2010 TG_{184}	Rusholme	October 17, 2010	Mount Lemmon	Mount Lemmon Survey	·	1.1 km	MPC · JPL
365605	2010 TF_{185}	—	September 28, 2006	Mount Lemmon	Mount Lemmon Survey	·	1.6 km	MPC · JPL
365606	2010 TX_{186}	—	September 17, 2010	Mount Lemmon	Mount Lemmon Survey	·	1.9 km	MPC · JPL
365607	2010 UN_{15}	—	March 11, 2008	Kitt Peak	Spacewatch	WIT	1.1 km	MPC · JPL
365608	2010 UV_{18}	—	December 7, 1999	Kitt Peak	Spacewatch	·	3.4 km	MPC · JPL
365609	2010 UA_{22}	—	February 28, 2008	Kitt Peak	Spacewatch	·	2.1 km	MPC · JPL
365610	2010 UY_{22}	—	October 17, 2010	Mount Lemmon	Mount Lemmon Survey	·	2.6 km	MPC · JPL
365611	2010 UG_{27}	—	March 4, 2008	Mount Lemmon	Mount Lemmon Survey	·	2.4 km	MPC · JPL
365612	2010 UQ_{27}	—	November 10, 2006	Kitt Peak	Spacewatch	·	1.0 km	MPC · JPL
365613	2010 UJ_{30}	—	July 11, 2005	Mount Lemmon	Mount Lemmon Survey	NEM	2.0 km	MPC · JPL
365614	2010 UR_{30}	—	October 29, 2010	Kitt Peak	Spacewatch	·	2.5 km	MPC · JPL
365615	2010 UT_{30}	—	October 30, 2005	Kitt Peak	Spacewatch	TEL	1.6 km	MPC · JPL
365616	2010 UW_{30}	—	September 1, 2005	Kitt Peak	Spacewatch	PAD	1.5 km	MPC · JPL
365617	2010 UQ_{31}	—	July 23, 2010	WISE	WISE	·	4.0 km	MPC · JPL
365618	2010 UP_{35}	—	May 26, 2006	Mount Lemmon	Mount Lemmon Survey	ERI	2.1 km	MPC · JPL
365619	2010 UB_{40}	—	March 15, 2007	Kitt Peak	Spacewatch	·	2.2 km	MPC · JPL
365620	2010 UJ_{44}	—	July 14, 2001	Palomar	NEAT	MAR	1.2 km	MPC · JPL
365621	2010 UZ_{50}	—	November 18, 2006	Kitt Peak	Spacewatch	·	2.8 km	MPC · JPL
365622	2010 UD_{52}	—	August 19, 2001	Socorro	LINEAR	·	1.5 km	MPC · JPL
365623	2010 UM_{52}	—	March 17, 2004	Kitt Peak	Spacewatch	·	1.6 km	MPC · JPL
365624	2010 UX_{53}	—	October 21, 2006	Kitt Peak	Spacewatch	MAR	1.1 km	MPC · JPL
365625	2010 UR_{54}	—	June 25, 2004	Kitt Peak	Spacewatch	·	2.0 km	MPC · JPL
365626	2010 UW_{56}	—	December 4, 2005	Kitt Peak	Spacewatch	EOS	2.5 km	MPC · JPL
365627	2010 UR_{57}	—	April 1, 2008	Kitt Peak	Spacewatch	TEL	1.5 km	MPC · JPL
365628	2010 UU_{57}	—	April 19, 2002	Kitt Peak	Spacewatch	·	3.3 km	MPC · JPL
365629	2010 UO_{59}	—	October 29, 2010	Kitt Peak	Spacewatch	EOS	2.4 km	MPC · JPL
365630	2010 UO_{62}	—	March 26, 2007	Mount Lemmon	Mount Lemmon Survey	·	3.2 km	MPC · JPL
365631	2010 UG_{65}	—	August 26, 2001	Palomar	NEAT	·	2.1 km	MPC · JPL
365632	2010 UB_{75}	—	March 20, 1999	Apache Point	SDSS	·	1.8 km	MPC · JPL
365633	2010 UB_{79}	—	January 17, 2007	Kitt Peak	Spacewatch	·	2.2 km	MPC · JPL
365634	2010 UM_{80}	—	November 13, 1999	Kitt Peak	Spacewatch	·	3.2 km	MPC · JPL
365635	2010 UT_{83}	—	August 4, 2001	Palomar	NEAT	MAR	1.3 km	MPC · JPL
365636	2010 UX_{83}	—	July 26, 2010	WISE	WISE	ADE	2.0 km	MPC · JPL
365637	2010 UZ_{83}	—	March 16, 2007	Kitt Peak	Spacewatch	·	3.0 km	MPC · JPL
365638	2010 UA_{86}	—	October 19, 2010	Mount Lemmon	Mount Lemmon Survey	·	1.8 km	MPC · JPL
365639	2010 UY_{91}	—	July 31, 2010	WISE	WISE	HOF	3.2 km	MPC · JPL
365640	2010 UA_{93}	—	August 1, 2009	Kitt Peak	Spacewatch	·	2.4 km	MPC · JPL
365641	2010 UH_{95}	—	February 7, 2006	Mount Lemmon	Mount Lemmon Survey	·	3.5 km	MPC · JPL
365642	2010 UN_{96}	—	October 16, 2010	La Sagra	OAM	·	3.3 km	MPC · JPL
365643	2010 UV_{99}	—	October 30, 2010	Kitt Peak	Spacewatch	·	2.1 km	MPC · JPL
365644	2010 UK_{100}	—	September 17, 2001	Socorro	LINEAR	·	1.8 km	MPC · JPL
365645	2010 UM_{101}	—	September 18, 2010	Mount Lemmon	Mount Lemmon Survey	·	2.0 km	MPC · JPL
365646	2010 UV_{101}	—	September 29, 2010	Mount Lemmon	Mount Lemmon Survey	·	3.1 km	MPC · JPL
365647	2010 UN_{103}	—	August 31, 2005	Kitt Peak	Spacewatch	·	1.8 km	MPC · JPL
365648	2010 UU_{107}	—	March 15, 2007	Kitt Peak	Spacewatch	·	1.4 km	MPC · JPL
365649	2010 VC_{15}	—	December 6, 1996	Kitt Peak	Spacewatch	·	1.8 km	MPC · JPL
365650	2010 VT_{20}	—	June 4, 2006	Mount Lemmon	Mount Lemmon Survey	·	1.3 km	MPC · JPL
365651	2010 VL_{25}	—	December 4, 2005	Kitt Peak	Spacewatch	·	2.8 km	MPC · JPL
365652	2010 VS_{25}	—	April 11, 2003	Kitt Peak	Spacewatch	L4	10 km	MPC · JPL
365653	2010 VD_{26}	—	August 24, 2001	Haleakala	NEAT	·	1.5 km	MPC · JPL
365654	2010 VY_{26}	—	August 10, 2010	Kitt Peak	Spacewatch	·	3.9 km	MPC · JPL
365655	2010 VO_{27}	—	August 10, 2010	Kitt Peak	Spacewatch	·	5.3 km	MPC · JPL
365656	2010 VQ_{31}	—	December 10, 2006	Kitt Peak	Spacewatch	·	1.5 km	MPC · JPL
365657	2010 VV_{31}	—	September 11, 2010	Mount Lemmon	Mount Lemmon Survey	·	1.7 km	MPC · JPL
365658	2010 VW_{31}	—	April 13, 2008	Kitt Peak	Spacewatch	·	1.8 km	MPC · JPL
365659	2010 VA_{32}	—	February 21, 2007	Kitt Peak	Spacewatch	·	1.8 km	MPC · JPL
365660	2010 VS_{36}	—	December 12, 2006	Kitt Peak	Spacewatch	BRG	1.7 km	MPC · JPL
365661	2010 VK_{38}	—	April 11, 2008	Kitt Peak	Spacewatch	·	2.1 km	MPC · JPL
365662	2010 VD_{44}	—	September 15, 2010	Les Engarouines	L. Bernasconi	·	1.7 km	MPC · JPL
365663	2010 VA_{46}	—	September 18, 2010	Mount Lemmon	Mount Lemmon Survey	L4	10 km	MPC · JPL
365664	2010 VM_{46}	—	October 10, 2004	Kitt Peak	Deep Ecliptic Survey	·	4.2 km	MPC · JPL
365665	2010 VL_{47}	—	September 15, 2009	Kitt Peak	Spacewatch	VER	3.7 km	MPC · JPL
365666	2010 VZ_{49}	—	October 13, 2010	Mount Lemmon	Mount Lemmon Survey	·	4.6 km	MPC · JPL
365667	2010 VJ_{50}	—	September 17, 2010	Mount Lemmon	Mount Lemmon Survey	·	2.5 km	MPC · JPL
365668	2010 VJ_{51}	—	October 13, 2010	Mount Lemmon	Mount Lemmon Survey	(31811)	3.2 km	MPC · JPL
365669	2010 VN_{53}	—	April 4, 2002	Kitt Peak	Spacewatch	EOS	2.4 km	MPC · JPL
365670	2010 VC_{65}	—	November 7, 2010	Kitt Peak	Spacewatch	·	3.4 km	MPC · JPL
365671	2010 VF_{71}	—	March 23, 2003	Apache Point	SDSS	·	2.3 km	MPC · JPL
365672	2010 VT_{75}	—	September 3, 2010	Mount Lemmon	Mount Lemmon Survey	·	3.1 km	MPC · JPL
365673	2010 VQ_{76}	—	April 18, 2007	Kitt Peak	Spacewatch	TIR	3.7 km	MPC · JPL
365674	2010 VB_{77}	—	February 2, 2008	Kitt Peak	Spacewatch	·	1.8 km	MPC · JPL
365675	2010 VO_{79}	—	April 23, 2004	Kitt Peak	Spacewatch	·	1.8 km	MPC · JPL
365676	2010 VR_{82}	—	October 29, 2005	Mount Lemmon	Mount Lemmon Survey	EOS	1.8 km	MPC · JPL
365677	2010 VL_{85}	—	May 5, 2008	Mount Lemmon	Mount Lemmon Survey	EOS	2.1 km	MPC · JPL
365678	2010 VY_{85}	—	October 10, 1999	Socorro	LINEAR	·	2.3 km	MPC · JPL
365679	2010 VM_{87}	—	November 5, 1999	Kitt Peak	Spacewatch	·	2.5 km	MPC · JPL
365680	2010 VJ_{89}	—	September 4, 2010	Kitt Peak	Spacewatch	·	3.2 km	MPC · JPL
365681	2010 VX_{90}	—	October 29, 2010	Kitt Peak	Spacewatch	(5)	1.6 km	MPC · JPL
365682	2010 VL_{92}	—	November 5, 2005	Mount Lemmon	Mount Lemmon Survey	·	2.3 km	MPC · JPL
365683	2010 VE_{99}	—	June 6, 2005	Kitt Peak	Spacewatch	·	2.0 km	MPC · JPL
365684	2010 VU_{101}	—	July 27, 2009	Kitt Peak	Spacewatch	·	2.9 km	MPC · JPL
365685	2010 VR_{102}	—	November 19, 2006	Kitt Peak	Spacewatch	(5)	1.2 km	MPC · JPL
365686	2010 VC_{104}	—	December 16, 2006	Kitt Peak	Spacewatch	·	1.5 km	MPC · JPL
365687	2010 VP_{104}	—	November 8, 2010	Kitt Peak	Spacewatch	·	1.9 km	MPC · JPL
365688	2010 VS_{104}	—	December 2, 2005	Kitt Peak	Spacewatch	·	3.3 km	MPC · JPL
365689	2010 VC_{105}	—	April 14, 2008	Kitt Peak	Spacewatch	·	2.1 km	MPC · JPL
365690	2010 VH_{106}	—	October 3, 2006	Mount Lemmon	Mount Lemmon Survey	·	1.0 km	MPC · JPL
365691	2010 VK_{106}	—	December 24, 2005	Kitt Peak	Spacewatch	·	2.5 km	MPC · JPL
365692	2010 VP_{110}	—	February 26, 2007	Mount Lemmon	Mount Lemmon Survey	HYG	2.7 km	MPC · JPL
365693	2010 VU_{110}	—	November 20, 2006	Kitt Peak	Spacewatch	·	1.4 km	MPC · JPL
365694	2010 VT_{116}	—	October 9, 2010	Mount Lemmon	Mount Lemmon Survey	BRA	1.9 km	MPC · JPL
365695	2010 VD_{119}	—	September 16, 2009	Kitt Peak	Spacewatch	L4	8.1 km	MPC · JPL
365696	2010 VE_{119}	—	August 18, 2009	Bergisch Gladbach	W. Bickel	EOS	2.0 km	MPC · JPL
365697	2010 VU_{120}	—	December 18, 2001	Socorro	LINEAR	·	2.1 km	MPC · JPL
365698	2010 VW_{120}	—	September 3, 2005	Palomar	NEAT	·	2.2 km	MPC · JPL
365699	2010 VX_{121}	—	October 13, 2010	Mount Lemmon	Mount Lemmon Survey	·	1.8 km	MPC · JPL
365700	2010 VF_{128}	—	October 9, 2010	Catalina	CSS	·	3.9 km	MPC · JPL

== 365701–365800 ==
back to top

Designation			Discovery			Properties		Ref
Permanent	Provisional	Named after	Date	Site	Discoverer(s)	Category	Diam.	Ref
365701	2010 VP_{128}	—	October 16, 2001	Kitt Peak	Spacewatch	·	2.0 km	MPC · JPL
365702	2010 VZ_{128}	—	June 27, 2005	Mount Lemmon	Mount Lemmon Survey	(5)	1.5 km	MPC · JPL
365703	2010 VE_{130}	—	September 11, 2010	Mount Lemmon	Mount Lemmon Survey	·	2.6 km	MPC · JPL
365704	2010 VZ_{132}	—	October 29, 2005	Catalina	CSS	·	2.1 km	MPC · JPL
365705	2010 VD_{136}	—	March 15, 2004	Kitt Peak	Spacewatch	·	2.0 km	MPC · JPL
365706	2010 VR_{138}	—	March 13, 2007	Kitt Peak	Spacewatch	·	3.3 km	MPC · JPL
365707	2010 VT_{142}	—	August 31, 2005	Palomar	NEAT	·	2.0 km	MPC · JPL
365708	2010 VU_{149}	—	December 7, 2005	Kitt Peak	Spacewatch	·	3.0 km	MPC · JPL
365709	2010 VD_{152}	—	April 30, 2008	Mount Lemmon	Mount Lemmon Survey	TEL	1.5 km	MPC · JPL
365710	2010 VV_{159}	—	April 1, 2008	Kitt Peak	Spacewatch	EOS	1.6 km	MPC · JPL
365711	2010 VJ_{160}	—	December 13, 2006	Kitt Peak	Spacewatch	·	2.2 km	MPC · JPL
365712	2010 VF_{168}	—	July 22, 2001	Palomar	NEAT	·	1.5 km	MPC · JPL
365713	2010 VH_{170}	—	May 5, 2008	Mount Lemmon	Mount Lemmon Survey	·	3.9 km	MPC · JPL
365714	2010 VG_{171}	—	October 14, 2010	Mount Lemmon	Mount Lemmon Survey	·	2.8 km	MPC · JPL
365715	2010 VB_{172}	—	October 28, 2010	Kitt Peak	Spacewatch	·	2.7 km	MPC · JPL
365716	2010 VK_{173}	—	November 10, 2010	Mount Lemmon	Mount Lemmon Survey	·	3.5 km	MPC · JPL
365717	2010 VW_{174}	—	December 4, 2005	Kitt Peak	Spacewatch	·	3.1 km	MPC · JPL
365718	2010 VH_{175}	—	September 18, 2010	Mount Lemmon	Mount Lemmon Survey	·	2.3 km	MPC · JPL
365719	2010 VA_{177}	—	September 11, 2010	Mount Lemmon	Mount Lemmon Survey	·	3.3 km	MPC · JPL
365720	2010 VZ_{179}	—	November 11, 2010	Mount Lemmon	Mount Lemmon Survey	·	4.0 km	MPC · JPL
365721	2010 VL_{181}	—	May 31, 2003	Cerro Tololo	Deep Ecliptic Survey	·	2.5 km	MPC · JPL
365722	2010 VS_{182}	—	November 29, 2005	Kitt Peak	Spacewatch	·	3.7 km	MPC · JPL
365723	2010 VK_{186}	—	July 29, 2009	Kitt Peak	Spacewatch	·	3.5 km	MPC · JPL
365724	2010 VC_{188}	—	November 13, 2010	Mount Lemmon	Mount Lemmon Survey	L4	9.9 km	MPC · JPL
365725	2010 VA_{193}	—	December 1, 2005	Kitt Peak	Spacewatch	·	2.2 km	MPC · JPL
365726	2010 VC_{195}	—	March 11, 2007	Mount Lemmon	Mount Lemmon Survey	·	2.7 km	MPC · JPL
365727	2010 VN_{198}	—	September 23, 2001	Kitt Peak	Spacewatch	·	2.1 km	MPC · JPL
365728	2010 VH_{199}	—	January 25, 2003	Palomar	NEAT	·	2.6 km	MPC · JPL
365729	2010 VM_{208}	—	February 13, 2002	Kitt Peak	Spacewatch	·	2.4 km	MPC · JPL
365730	2010 VE_{211}	—	November 17, 2006	Mount Lemmon	Mount Lemmon Survey	·	2.2 km	MPC · JPL
365731	2010 VB_{212}	—	October 2, 2005	Mount Lemmon	Mount Lemmon Survey	KOR	1.3 km	MPC · JPL
365732	2010 VZ_{213}	—	October 8, 2004	Kitt Peak	Spacewatch	·	2.6 km	MPC · JPL
365733	2010 VU_{214}	—	October 20, 2006	Mount Lemmon	Mount Lemmon Survey	·	1.4 km	MPC · JPL
365734	2010 VV_{214}	—	February 10, 2008	Kitt Peak	Spacewatch	·	2.1 km	MPC · JPL
365735	2010 WJ_{8}	—	October 25, 2005	Kitt Peak	Spacewatch	EOS	1.7 km	MPC · JPL
365736	2010 WK_{8}	—	December 8, 2004	Socorro	LINEAR	CYB	6.0 km	MPC · JPL
365737	2010 WQ_{9}	—	October 5, 2004	Kitt Peak	Spacewatch	EOS	2.2 km	MPC · JPL
365738	2010 WX_{9}	—	February 25, 2007	Kitt Peak	Spacewatch	·	1.7 km	MPC · JPL
365739 Peterbecker	2010 WS_{12}	Peterbecker	September 15, 2004	Drebach	~Knöfel, A.	EOS	2.1 km	MPC · JPL
365740	2010 WC_{14}	—	October 9, 2005	Kitt Peak	Spacewatch	·	2.1 km	MPC · JPL
365741	2010 WN_{15}	—	September 7, 2004	Socorro	LINEAR	·	4.0 km	MPC · JPL
365742	2010 WO_{15}	—	September 24, 2005	Palomar	NEAT	·	2.2 km	MPC · JPL
365743	2010 WK_{21}	—	November 1, 2010	Kitt Peak	Spacewatch	EOS	2.4 km	MPC · JPL
365744	2010 WZ_{22}	—	February 26, 2007	Catalina	CSS	·	3.3 km	MPC · JPL
365745	2010 WS_{26}	—	February 8, 2008	Mount Lemmon	Mount Lemmon Survey	(5)	1.8 km	MPC · JPL
365746	2010 WW_{26}	—	September 19, 1998	Kitt Peak	Spacewatch	·	2.9 km	MPC · JPL
365747	2010 WB_{33}	—	January 7, 2006	Mount Lemmon	Mount Lemmon Survey	·	3.3 km	MPC · JPL
365748	2010 WA_{38}	—	September 16, 2009	Mount Lemmon	Mount Lemmon Survey	·	3.4 km	MPC · JPL
365749	2010 WZ_{39}	—	November 3, 2005	Mount Lemmon	Mount Lemmon Survey	·	2.5 km	MPC · JPL
365750	2010 WY_{49}	—	September 25, 2006	Kitt Peak	Spacewatch	(194)	2.6 km	MPC · JPL
365751	2010 WS_{54}	—	September 5, 2000	Anderson Mesa	LONEOS	·	860 m	MPC · JPL
365752	2010 WR_{55}	—	November 7, 2010	Mount Lemmon	Mount Lemmon Survey	·	4.0 km	MPC · JPL
365753	2010 WL_{60}	—	November 22, 2005	Kitt Peak	Spacewatch	TEL	1.6 km	MPC · JPL
365754	2010 WX_{69}	—	December 30, 2005	Kitt Peak	Spacewatch	·	3.1 km	MPC · JPL
365755	2010 WA_{71}	—	August 26, 2005	Palomar	NEAT	·	2.2 km	MPC · JPL
365756 ISON	2010 WZ_{71}	ISON	November 4, 2010	Mayhill-ISON	L. Elenin	T_{j} (2.58) · unusual	9.0 km	MPC · JPL
365757	2010 WX_{72}	—	December 17, 2006	Mount Lemmon	Mount Lemmon Survey	·	2.5 km	MPC · JPL
365758	2010 XR_{2}	—	December 1, 2010	Mayhill	Bill, H.	EOS	2.1 km	MPC · JPL
365759	2010 XS_{3}	—	October 30, 2010	Kitt Peak	Spacewatch	·	2.5 km	MPC · JPL
365760	2010 XP_{4}	—	April 5, 2008	Kitt Peak	Spacewatch	·	2.4 km	MPC · JPL
365761 Popovici	2010 XQ_{4}	Popovici	April 3, 2008	Mount Lemmon	Mount Lemmon Survey	·	1.2 km	MPC · JPL
365762	2010 XZ_{8}	—	August 16, 1993	Caussols	E. W. Elst	(5)	1.8 km	MPC · JPL
365763	2010 XE_{10}	—	July 28, 2009	Kitt Peak	Spacewatch	EOS	2.3 km	MPC · JPL
365764	2010 XX_{11}	—	January 8, 2003	Socorro	LINEAR	·	1.5 km	MPC · JPL
365765	2010 XE_{12}	—	December 14, 2004	Kitt Peak	Spacewatch	·	4.2 km	MPC · JPL
365766	2010 XK_{14}	—	October 25, 2005	Kitt Peak	Spacewatch	·	1.7 km	MPC · JPL
365767	2010 XO_{21}	—	November 19, 2001	Anderson Mesa	LONEOS	·	2.2 km	MPC · JPL
365768	2010 XG_{23}	—	April 15, 2008	Mount Lemmon	Mount Lemmon Survey	·	1.8 km	MPC · JPL
365769	2010 XN_{24}	—	December 6, 1999	Socorro	LINEAR	·	3.2 km	MPC · JPL
365770	2010 XR_{35}	—	September 25, 2005	Kitt Peak	Spacewatch	AGN	1.3 km	MPC · JPL
365771	2010 XY_{35}	—	July 20, 2001	Palomar	NEAT	·	1.6 km	MPC · JPL
365772	2010 XN_{49}	—	February 21, 2007	Kitt Peak	Spacewatch	·	2.9 km	MPC · JPL
365773	2010 XU_{49}	—	January 24, 2006	Kitt Peak	Spacewatch	EMA	3.7 km	MPC · JPL
365774	2010 XF_{50}	—	July 8, 1997	Kitt Peak	Spacewatch	BRG	2.1 km	MPC · JPL
365775	2010 XH_{50}	—	December 3, 2010	Mount Lemmon	Mount Lemmon Survey	·	3.6 km	MPC · JPL
365776	2010 XH_{51}	—	October 22, 2005	Kitt Peak	Spacewatch	·	1.9 km	MPC · JPL
365777	2010 XH_{54}	—	May 19, 2004	Kitt Peak	Spacewatch	·	2.5 km	MPC · JPL
365778	2010 XK_{56}	—	November 2, 2010	Kitt Peak	Spacewatch	EOS	2.2 km	MPC · JPL
365779	2010 XL_{57}	—	December 27, 2000	Kitt Peak	Spacewatch	·	1.7 km	MPC · JPL
365780	2010 XU_{60}	—	October 28, 2001	Palomar	NEAT	·	2.0 km	MPC · JPL
365781	2010 XC_{61}	—	November 6, 1999	Kitt Peak	Spacewatch	·	2.1 km	MPC · JPL
365782	2010 XC_{73}	—	December 2, 2005	Kitt Peak	Spacewatch	EOS	2.2 km	MPC · JPL
365783	2010 XB_{74}	—	May 31, 2008	Mount Lemmon	Mount Lemmon Survey	·	2.2 km	MPC · JPL
365784	2010 XZ_{74}	—	December 2, 2004	Palomar	NEAT	·	4.5 km	MPC · JPL
365785	2010 XC_{76}	—	December 1, 2005	Kitt Peak	Spacewatch	·	2.2 km	MPC · JPL
365786 Florencelosse	2010 YJ	Florencelosse	December 25, 2010	Saint-Pardon-de-Conques	Saint-Pardon-de-Conques Observatory	·	4.1 km	MPC · JPL
365787	2011 AW_{16}	—	November 25, 2006	Kitt Peak	Spacewatch	MAR	1.2 km	MPC · JPL
365788	2011 AF_{17}	—	March 29, 2008	Kitt Peak	Spacewatch	·	2.3 km	MPC · JPL
365789	2011 AQ_{20}	—	December 19, 2004	Catalina	CSS	TIR	3.2 km	MPC · JPL
365790	2011 AK_{21}	—	February 1, 2010	WISE	WISE	·	4.0 km	MPC · JPL
365791	2011 AT_{23}	—	January 3, 2000	Kitt Peak	Spacewatch	·	1.2 km	MPC · JPL
365792	2011 AV_{23}	—	December 21, 2001	Kitt Peak	Spacewatch	WIT	1.2 km	MPC · JPL
365793	2011 AY_{27}	—	December 18, 2001	Kitt Peak	Spacewatch	·	2.1 km	MPC · JPL
365794	2011 AS_{35}	—	December 10, 2004	Kitt Peak	Spacewatch	THB	3.7 km	MPC · JPL
365795	2011 AS_{54}	—	October 15, 2009	Catalina	CSS	·	2.4 km	MPC · JPL
365796	2011 AM_{57}	—	December 28, 2005	Kitt Peak	Spacewatch	·	3.6 km	MPC · JPL
365797	2011 BW_{15}	—	September 15, 2007	Catalina	CSS	H	590 m	MPC · JPL
365798	2011 BF_{26}	—	November 3, 2004	Palomar	NEAT	·	3.4 km	MPC · JPL
365799	2011 BR_{27}	—	January 25, 2011	Kitt Peak	Spacewatch	EOS	2.4 km	MPC · JPL
365800	2011 CF_{3}	—	January 13, 2011	Kitt Peak	Spacewatch	·	3.1 km	MPC · JPL

== 365801–365900 ==
back to top

Designation			Discovery			Properties		Ref
Permanent	Provisional	Named after	Date	Site	Discoverer(s)	Category	Diam.	Ref
365801	2011 CH_{3}	—	October 17, 2003	Kitt Peak	Spacewatch	·	3.9 km	MPC · JPL
365802	2011 CZ_{69}	—	January 13, 2005	Catalina	CSS	·	4.4 km	MPC · JPL
365803	2011 CJ_{115}	—	September 5, 1999	Catalina	CSS	·	2.5 km	MPC · JPL
365804	2011 DV_{41}	—	September 24, 1992	Kitt Peak	Spacewatch	·	3.2 km	MPC · JPL
365805	2011 EP_{16}	—	September 4, 2003	Kitt Peak	Spacewatch	·	2.4 km	MPC · JPL
365806	2011 EU_{42}	—	December 20, 2004	Mount Lemmon	Mount Lemmon Survey	·	4.3 km	MPC · JPL
365807	2011 HS_{51}	—	October 29, 2008	Mount Lemmon	Mount Lemmon Survey	EUN	1.6 km	MPC · JPL
365808	2011 QK_{67}	—	January 7, 2006	Kitt Peak	Spacewatch	·	650 m	MPC · JPL
365809	2011 QT_{98}	—	July 30, 2005	Palomar	NEAT	VER	3.3 km	MPC · JPL
365810	2011 RU_{3}	—	August 4, 2002	Palomar	NEAT	·	1.9 km	MPC · JPL
365811	2011 RS_{9}	—	February 20, 2009	Kitt Peak	Spacewatch	·	2.3 km	MPC · JPL
365812	2011 SX_{37}	—	October 1, 2000	Socorro	LINEAR	TIR	3.1 km	MPC · JPL
365813	2011 SP_{51}	—	January 20, 2009	Catalina	CSS	·	860 m	MPC · JPL
365814	2011 SD_{85}	—	January 26, 2004	Anderson Mesa	LONEOS	·	1.3 km	MPC · JPL
365815	2011 SX_{89}	—	January 5, 2006	Mount Lemmon	Mount Lemmon Survey	·	620 m	MPC · JPL
365816	2011 SJ_{91}	—	October 21, 2001	Socorro	LINEAR	·	780 m	MPC · JPL
365817	2011 SJ_{114}	—	September 18, 2006	Catalina	CSS	·	3.4 km	MPC · JPL
365818	2011 SE_{147}	—	October 23, 2004	Kitt Peak	Spacewatch	MAS	940 m	MPC · JPL
365819	2011 SF_{171}	—	June 13, 2010	Mount Lemmon	Mount Lemmon Survey	·	2.6 km	MPC · JPL
365820	2011 SH_{180}	—	March 9, 2002	Palomar	NEAT	·	890 m	MPC · JPL
365821	2011 SS_{180}	—	April 4, 2002	Kitt Peak	Spacewatch	·	1.1 km	MPC · JPL
365822	2011 SO_{187}	—	April 5, 2000	Socorro	LINEAR	·	650 m	MPC · JPL
365823	2011 SS_{216}	—	March 13, 2005	Kitt Peak	Spacewatch	H	600 m	MPC · JPL
365824	2011 SC_{220}	—	December 14, 2004	Kitt Peak	Spacewatch	·	930 m	MPC · JPL
365825	2011 SH_{224}	—	September 23, 1995	Kitt Peak	Spacewatch	·	810 m	MPC · JPL
365826	2011 SA_{255}	—	November 1, 2008	Mount Lemmon	Mount Lemmon Survey	·	580 m	MPC · JPL
365827	2011 SA_{260}	—	April 25, 2003	Kitt Peak	Spacewatch	·	600 m	MPC · JPL
365828	2011 SF_{260}	—	March 3, 2009	Mount Lemmon	Mount Lemmon Survey	NYS	1.2 km	MPC · JPL
365829	2011 SL_{261}	—	January 31, 2009	Mount Lemmon	Mount Lemmon Survey	V	640 m	MPC · JPL
365830	2011 SU_{261}	—	January 15, 2009	Kitt Peak	Spacewatch	·	940 m	MPC · JPL
365831	2011 SN_{275}	—	March 11, 2010	WISE	WISE	·	1.9 km	MPC · JPL
365832	2011 TE_{2}	—	October 19, 2003	Palomar	NEAT	H	700 m	MPC · JPL
365833	2011 TM_{4}	—	September 25, 2011	Haleakala	Pan-STARRS 1	H	700 m	MPC · JPL
365834	2011 TH_{7}	—	January 7, 1999	Kitt Peak	Spacewatch	·	630 m	MPC · JPL
365835	2011 TA_{17}	—	August 19, 2006	Kitt Peak	Spacewatch	·	2.0 km	MPC · JPL
365836	2011 TH_{17}	—	April 19, 2006	Kitt Peak	Spacewatch	(5)	1.7 km	MPC · JPL
365837	2011 UW_{1}	—	September 28, 2001	Palomar	NEAT	·	760 m	MPC · JPL
365838	2011 UR_{16}	—	April 13, 2002	Palomar	NEAT	·	1.3 km	MPC · JPL
365839	2011 UK_{26}	—	November 4, 2004	Kitt Peak	Spacewatch	·	890 m	MPC · JPL
365840	2011 UB_{58}	—	February 4, 2005	Palomar	NEAT	·	1.6 km	MPC · JPL
365841	2011 US_{58}	—	March 26, 2006	Mount Lemmon	Mount Lemmon Survey	·	760 m	MPC · JPL
365842	2011 UY_{70}	—	March 12, 2003	Kitt Peak	Spacewatch	·	670 m	MPC · JPL
365843	2011 UM_{76}	—	May 18, 2010	WISE	WISE	·	1.7 km	MPC · JPL
365844	2011 US_{83}	—	February 9, 2002	Kitt Peak	Spacewatch	·	700 m	MPC · JPL
365845	2011 UU_{84}	—	January 22, 2004	Palomar	NEAT	·	1.9 km	MPC · JPL
365846	2011 UN_{87}	—	November 9, 2007	Kitt Peak	Spacewatch	EUN	1.0 km	MPC · JPL
365847	2011 UU_{92}	—	October 9, 2004	Kitt Peak	Spacewatch	·	850 m	MPC · JPL
365848	2011 UD_{94}	—	February 11, 2002	Kitt Peak	Spacewatch	·	710 m	MPC · JPL
365849	2011 UG_{103}	—	April 26, 1993	Kitt Peak	Spacewatch	·	3.0 km	MPC · JPL
365850	2011 UY_{104}	—	October 24, 2005	Mauna Kea	A. Boattini	·	790 m	MPC · JPL
365851	2011 UJ_{106}	—	September 19, 2006	Catalina	CSS	·	2.3 km	MPC · JPL
365852	2011 UK_{106}	—	December 3, 2000	Kitt Peak	Spacewatch	NYS	1.2 km	MPC · JPL
365853	2011 UG_{113}	—	April 16, 2004	Socorro	LINEAR	GAL	2.2 km	MPC · JPL
365854	2011 UJ_{126}	—	January 30, 2004	Kitt Peak	Spacewatch	(5)	1.1 km	MPC · JPL
365855	2011 UV_{126}	—	December 5, 2008	Kitt Peak	Spacewatch	·	1.3 km	MPC · JPL
365856	2011 UA_{127}	—	October 14, 1998	Xinglong	SCAP	·	4.8 km	MPC · JPL
365857	2011 UR_{128}	—	October 8, 2007	Catalina	CSS	·	2.1 km	MPC · JPL
365858	2011 UY_{132}	—	October 3, 2002	Palomar	NEAT	·	1.8 km	MPC · JPL
365859	2011 UK_{133}	—	February 6, 2006	Mount Lemmon	Mount Lemmon Survey	·	1.1 km	MPC · JPL
365860	2011 UE_{138}	—	October 10, 2004	Kitt Peak	Spacewatch	·	780 m	MPC · JPL
365861	2011 UQ_{142}	—	September 13, 2007	Catalina	CSS	·	1.1 km	MPC · JPL
365862	2011 UM_{145}	—	November 12, 2001	Kitt Peak	Spacewatch	·	550 m	MPC · JPL
365863	2011 UH_{149}	—	December 19, 2004	Mount Lemmon	Mount Lemmon Survey	·	790 m	MPC · JPL
365864	2011 UR_{149}	—	September 15, 2007	Kitt Peak	Spacewatch	NYS	1.2 km	MPC · JPL
365865	2011 UM_{152}	—	October 29, 1998	Kitt Peak	Spacewatch	·	680 m	MPC · JPL
365866	2011 UN_{188}	—	November 10, 2004	Kitt Peak	Spacewatch	·	1.0 km	MPC · JPL
365867	2011 UV_{209}	—	September 13, 2007	Mount Lemmon	Mount Lemmon Survey	·	1.4 km	MPC · JPL
365868	2011 UT_{237}	—	January 15, 2004	Kitt Peak	Spacewatch	·	1.4 km	MPC · JPL
365869	2011 UJ_{260}	—	December 28, 2005	Mount Lemmon	Mount Lemmon Survey	·	810 m	MPC · JPL
365870	2011 UO_{282}	—	May 1, 2006	Kitt Peak	Spacewatch	·	650 m	MPC · JPL
365871	2011 UN_{285}	—	April 19, 2004	Kitt Peak	Spacewatch	·	4.2 km	MPC · JPL
365872	2011 UC_{295}	—	August 21, 2007	Anderson Mesa	LONEOS	·	1.3 km	MPC · JPL
365873	2011 UT_{295}	—	February 3, 2009	Kitt Peak	Spacewatch	MAS	710 m	MPC · JPL
365874	2011 UH_{299}	—	January 18, 2005	Catalina	CSS	·	1.4 km	MPC · JPL
365875	2011 UV_{300}	—	May 10, 2003	Kitt Peak	Spacewatch	·	730 m	MPC · JPL
365876	2011 UN_{308}	—	December 9, 2004	Kitt Peak	Spacewatch	·	1.2 km	MPC · JPL
365877	2011 UE_{315}	—	March 27, 2009	Siding Spring	SSS	PHO	1.2 km	MPC · JPL
365878	2011 UO_{315}	—	May 6, 2006	Mount Lemmon	Mount Lemmon Survey	·	1.0 km	MPC · JPL
365879	2011 UC_{318}	—	May 25, 2006	Mauna Kea	P. A. Wiegert	·	850 m	MPC · JPL
365880	2011 UF_{319}	—	September 11, 2004	Kitt Peak	Spacewatch	·	580 m	MPC · JPL
365881	2011 UA_{320}	—	November 5, 2007	Kitt Peak	Spacewatch	·	890 m	MPC · JPL
365882	2011 UO_{359}	—	May 17, 2009	Kitt Peak	Spacewatch	·	1.4 km	MPC · JPL
365883	2011 UP_{361}	—	January 13, 1999	Kitt Peak	Spacewatch	·	1.3 km	MPC · JPL
365884	2011 UU_{366}	—	October 13, 2004	Kitt Peak	Spacewatch	V	810 m	MPC · JPL
365885	2011 UM_{369}	—	October 22, 2011	Kitt Peak	Spacewatch	·	950 m	MPC · JPL
365886	2011 UL_{381}	—	January 17, 2004	Palomar	NEAT	·	1.2 km	MPC · JPL
365887	2011 UC_{401}	—	March 18, 2009	Kitt Peak	Spacewatch	·	2.8 km	MPC · JPL
365888	2011 UK_{402}	—	May 9, 2005	Catalina	CSS	H	660 m	MPC · JPL
365889	2011 UF_{406}	—	March 24, 2003	Kitt Peak	Spacewatch	·	3.1 km	MPC · JPL
365890	2011 VB_{12}	—	December 30, 2008	Mount Lemmon	Mount Lemmon Survey	·	850 m	MPC · JPL
365891	2011 VV_{21}	—	September 29, 2005	Kitt Peak	Spacewatch	·	2.7 km	MPC · JPL
365892	2011 WK_{1}	—	March 31, 2003	Anderson Mesa	LONEOS	·	920 m	MPC · JPL
365893	2011 WB_{3}	—	August 31, 1995	La Silla	C.-I. Lagerkvist	·	740 m	MPC · JPL
365894	2011 WJ_{10}	—	December 20, 2004	Mount Lemmon	Mount Lemmon Survey	MAS	650 m	MPC · JPL
365895	2011 WK_{13}	—	October 23, 2011	Haleakala	Pan-STARRS 1	·	4.3 km	MPC · JPL
365896	2011 WC_{16}	—	August 21, 2006	Goodricke-Pigott	R. A. Tucker	·	2.7 km	MPC · JPL
365897	2011 WQ_{24}	—	December 3, 2004	Kitt Peak	Spacewatch	·	1.4 km	MPC · JPL
365898	2011 WK_{29}	—	March 19, 2009	Mount Lemmon	Mount Lemmon Survey	HNS	1.4 km	MPC · JPL
365899	2011 WY_{36}	—	September 18, 2001	Apache Point	SDSS	·	650 m	MPC · JPL
365900	2011 WM_{52}	—	November 3, 2004	Kitt Peak	Spacewatch	·	850 m	MPC · JPL

== 365901–366000 ==
back to top

Designation			Discovery			Properties		Ref
Permanent	Provisional	Named after	Date	Site	Discoverer(s)	Category	Diam.	Ref
365901	2011 WS_{57}	—	April 30, 2004	Kitt Peak	Spacewatch	DOR	2.1 km	MPC · JPL
365902	2011 WM_{59}	—	August 27, 2006	Kitt Peak	Spacewatch	·	1.3 km	MPC · JPL
365903	2011 WH_{60}	—	October 21, 2011	Mount Lemmon	Mount Lemmon Survey	·	880 m	MPC · JPL
365904	2011 WG_{63}	—	September 15, 2007	Mount Lemmon	Mount Lemmon Survey	·	990 m	MPC · JPL
365905	2011 WP_{65}	—	February 20, 2007	Siding Spring	SSS	·	3.9 km	MPC · JPL
365906	2011 WY_{70}	—	December 25, 2003	Kitt Peak	Spacewatch	·	1.2 km	MPC · JPL
365907	2011 WC_{71}	—	November 20, 2001	Socorro	LINEAR	·	740 m	MPC · JPL
365908	2011 WC_{89}	—	November 24, 2006	Kitt Peak	Spacewatch	·	1.5 km	MPC · JPL
365909	2011 WD_{91}	—	March 26, 2004	Socorro	LINEAR	·	3.3 km	MPC · JPL
365910	2011 WG_{95}	—	November 8, 2007	Kitt Peak	Spacewatch	·	1.0 km	MPC · JPL
365911	2011 WN_{104}	—	November 21, 2008	Kitt Peak	Spacewatch	·	830 m	MPC · JPL
365912	2011 WX_{105}	—	April 16, 2007	Catalina	CSS	·	3.8 km	MPC · JPL
365913	2011 WL_{106}	—	December 1, 2008	Mount Lemmon	Mount Lemmon Survey	·	1.0 km	MPC · JPL
365914	2011 WZ_{115}	—	November 2, 2007	Kitt Peak	Spacewatch	·	1.1 km	MPC · JPL
365915	2011 WN_{116}	—	December 4, 2007	Kitt Peak	Spacewatch	EUN	1.5 km	MPC · JPL
365916	2011 WF_{117}	—	November 12, 2007	Mount Lemmon	Mount Lemmon Survey	·	1.6 km	MPC · JPL
365917	2011 WK_{136}	—	March 26, 2003	Kitt Peak	Spacewatch	·	840 m	MPC · JPL
365918	2011 WL_{136}	—	November 3, 2010	Kitt Peak	Spacewatch	L4	8.0 km	MPC · JPL
365919	2011 WU_{142}	—	November 23, 2002	Palomar	NEAT	·	1.8 km	MPC · JPL
365920	2011 XV_{2}	—	December 18, 2007	Kitt Peak	Spacewatch	·	1.2 km	MPC · JPL
365921	2011 YU_{17}	—	November 11, 2007	Mount Lemmon	Mount Lemmon Survey	·	1.2 km	MPC · JPL
365922	2011 YJ_{20}	—	September 2, 2010	Mount Lemmon	Mount Lemmon Survey	·	2.4 km	MPC · JPL
365923	2011 YV_{22}	—	December 1, 2006	Kitt Peak	Spacewatch	DOR	2.5 km	MPC · JPL
365924	2011 YQ_{33}	—	September 19, 2010	Kitt Peak	Spacewatch	·	2.0 km	MPC · JPL
365925	2011 YR_{33}	—	May 2, 2009	Mount Lemmon	Mount Lemmon Survey	·	2.0 km	MPC · JPL
365926	2011 YQ_{35}	—	September 21, 2007	XuYi	PMO NEO Survey Program	V	610 m	MPC · JPL
365927	2011 YU_{40}	—	August 9, 2010	WISE	WISE	·	6.1 km	MPC · JPL
365928	2011 YY_{52}	—	October 27, 2006	Catalina	CSS	·	2.3 km	MPC · JPL
365929	2011 YH_{56}	—	December 31, 2007	Kitt Peak	Spacewatch	·	1.4 km	MPC · JPL
365930	2011 YS_{56}	—	April 14, 2007	Kitt Peak	Spacewatch	THM	2.1 km	MPC · JPL
365931	2011 YN_{60}	—	January 27, 2007	Mount Lemmon	Mount Lemmon Survey	·	1.9 km	MPC · JPL
365932	2011 YV_{60}	—	September 22, 2003	Palomar	NEAT	·	1.6 km	MPC · JPL
365933	2011 YR_{66}	—	September 27, 2002	Palomar	NEAT	H	800 m	MPC · JPL
365934	2011 YM_{68}	—	March 20, 2007	Anderson Mesa	LONEOS	CYB	4.4 km	MPC · JPL
365935	2011 YT_{75}	—	January 22, 2004	Socorro	LINEAR	H	540 m	MPC · JPL
365936	2011 YF_{78}	—	October 23, 2003	Kitt Peak	Spacewatch	·	1.5 km	MPC · JPL
365937	2012 AB_{1}	—	May 4, 2006	Siding Spring	SSS	·	3.3 km	MPC · JPL
365938	2012 AF_{2}	—	November 10, 2004	Kitt Peak	Spacewatch	·	800 m	MPC · JPL
365939	2012 AW_{2}	—	October 4, 2006	Mount Lemmon	Mount Lemmon Survey	MAR	1.3 km	MPC · JPL
365940	2012 AA_{6}	—	December 26, 1998	Kitt Peak	Spacewatch	EUN	1.4 km	MPC · JPL
365941	2012 AO_{6}	—	November 19, 2001	Socorro	LINEAR	·	2.4 km	MPC · JPL
365942	2012 AE_{9}	—	December 29, 2011	Kitt Peak	Spacewatch	·	1.2 km	MPC · JPL
365943	2012 AJ_{12}	—	December 21, 2006	Mount Lemmon	Mount Lemmon Survey	·	2.3 km	MPC · JPL
365944	2012 AZ_{16}	—	March 9, 2003	Kitt Peak	Deep Lens Survey	DOR	2.3 km	MPC · JPL
365945	2012 AC_{18}	—	April 6, 2000	Kitt Peak	Spacewatch	·	1.4 km	MPC · JPL
365946	2012 AH_{19}	—	August 29, 2009	Catalina	CSS	·	4.1 km	MPC · JPL
365947	2012 AN_{21}	—	December 7, 2004	Socorro	LINEAR	PHO	1.2 km	MPC · JPL
365948	2012 AV_{22}	—	February 14, 2005	La Silla	A. Boattini, H. Scholl	·	4.5 km	MPC · JPL
365949	2012 BS_{3}	—	October 25, 2005	Kitt Peak	Spacewatch	·	2.4 km	MPC · JPL
365950	2012 BJ_{4}	—	February 3, 2008	Mount Lemmon	Mount Lemmon Survey	·	2.2 km	MPC · JPL
365951	2012 BD_{8}	—	March 20, 2002	Kitt Peak	Deep Ecliptic Survey	·	1.7 km	MPC · JPL
365952	2012 BH_{9}	—	March 14, 2007	Mount Lemmon	Mount Lemmon Survey	·	3.3 km	MPC · JPL
365953	2012 BK_{9}	—	March 12, 2007	Mount Lemmon	Mount Lemmon Survey	EOS	1.8 km	MPC · JPL
365954	2012 BO_{10}	—	April 15, 2002	Anderson Mesa	LONEOS	·	3.0 km	MPC · JPL
365955	2012 BS_{11}	—	December 27, 2005	Kitt Peak	Spacewatch	VER	3.2 km	MPC · JPL
365956	2012 BO_{14}	—	April 18, 2009	Kitt Peak	Spacewatch	MAR	1.3 km	MPC · JPL
365957	2012 BW_{14}	—	February 8, 2007	Kitt Peak	Spacewatch	·	2.0 km	MPC · JPL
365958	2012 BZ_{16}	—	November 29, 2005	Junk Bond	D. Healy	·	2.1 km	MPC · JPL
365959	2012 BB_{23}	—	October 21, 1995	Kitt Peak	Spacewatch	·	1.5 km	MPC · JPL
365960	2012 BE_{24}	—	December 11, 2010	Catalina	CSS	CYB	5.5 km	MPC · JPL
365961	2012 BU_{24}	—	December 21, 2006	Palomar	NEAT	·	3.2 km	MPC · JPL
365962	2012 BB_{26}	—	February 10, 2002	Socorro	LINEAR	·	2.3 km	MPC · JPL
365963	2012 BG_{31}	—	April 11, 2007	Mount Lemmon	Mount Lemmon Survey	·	2.9 km	MPC · JPL
365964	2012 BK_{33}	—	September 9, 2004	Kitt Peak	Spacewatch	·	3.5 km	MPC · JPL
365965	2012 BS_{33}	—	April 24, 2010	WISE	WISE	·	2.1 km	MPC · JPL
365966	2012 BU_{34}	—	December 4, 2005	Mount Lemmon	Mount Lemmon Survey	·	2.5 km	MPC · JPL
365967	2012 BU_{35}	—	October 16, 2006	Kitt Peak	Spacewatch	(12739)	1.3 km	MPC · JPL
365968	2012 BW_{35}	—	March 21, 2004	Kitt Peak	Spacewatch	·	2.5 km	MPC · JPL
365969	2012 BT_{42}	—	January 10, 2007	Mount Lemmon	Mount Lemmon Survey	EOS	1.9 km	MPC · JPL
365970	2012 BT_{43}	—	November 17, 2006	Mount Lemmon	Mount Lemmon Survey	·	2.1 km	MPC · JPL
365971	2012 BM_{47}	—	May 10, 2002	Palomar	NEAT	·	1.4 km	MPC · JPL
365972	2012 BL_{49}	—	February 11, 2008	Mount Lemmon	Mount Lemmon Survey	·	1.4 km	MPC · JPL
365973	2012 BM_{51}	—	October 21, 2006	Kitt Peak	Spacewatch	·	1.4 km	MPC · JPL
365974	2012 BV_{52}	—	January 8, 2006	Mount Lemmon	Mount Lemmon Survey	·	3.9 km	MPC · JPL
365975	2012 BM_{55}	—	December 27, 2005	Kitt Peak	Spacewatch	EOS	2.4 km	MPC · JPL
365976	2012 BT_{56}	—	March 10, 2008	Mount Lemmon	Mount Lemmon Survey	GEF	1.7 km	MPC · JPL
365977	2012 BJ_{68}	—	September 11, 2005	Kitt Peak	Spacewatch	AGN	1.2 km	MPC · JPL
365978	2012 BC_{70}	—	November 25, 2005	Mount Lemmon	Mount Lemmon Survey	·	3.0 km	MPC · JPL
365979	2012 BT_{70}	—	September 16, 2004	Kitt Peak	Spacewatch	THM	3.3 km	MPC · JPL
365980	2012 BY_{70}	—	February 4, 2006	Mount Lemmon	Mount Lemmon Survey	LIX	4.3 km	MPC · JPL
365981	2012 BZ_{70}	—	September 11, 2010	Kitt Peak	Spacewatch	·	1.7 km	MPC · JPL
365982	2012 BT_{72}	—	October 15, 2001	Palomar	NEAT	·	2.5 km	MPC · JPL
365983	2012 BN_{73}	—	April 23, 2007	Catalina	CSS	T_{j} (2.99) · EUP	3.8 km	MPC · JPL
365984	2012 BX_{73}	—	January 2, 2012	Kitt Peak	Spacewatch	·	2.6 km	MPC · JPL
365985	2012 BF_{74}	—	March 31, 2009	Kitt Peak	Spacewatch	·	1.5 km	MPC · JPL
365986	2012 BJ_{76}	—	August 21, 2006	Kitt Peak	Spacewatch	·	1.4 km	MPC · JPL
365987	2012 BM_{81}	—	November 21, 2006	Mount Lemmon	Mount Lemmon Survey	·	3.0 km	MPC · JPL
365988	2012 BG_{83}	—	November 4, 2005	Mount Lemmon	Mount Lemmon Survey	·	3.0 km	MPC · JPL
365989	2012 BS_{84}	—	April 1, 2008	Mount Lemmon	Mount Lemmon Survey	AGN	1.1 km	MPC · JPL
365990	2012 BT_{87}	—	September 25, 2006	Catalina	CSS	MAR	1.4 km	MPC · JPL
365991	2012 BY_{87}	—	October 29, 2006	Mount Lemmon	Mount Lemmon Survey	·	2.4 km	MPC · JPL
365992	2012 BR_{89}	—	October 21, 2006	Mount Lemmon	Mount Lemmon Survey	·	1.7 km	MPC · JPL
365993	2012 BU_{89}	—	December 27, 2006	Mount Lemmon	Mount Lemmon Survey	AGN	1.4 km	MPC · JPL
365994	2012 BE_{90}	—	November 12, 2001	Socorro	LINEAR	·	2.5 km	MPC · JPL
365995	2012 BO_{90}	—	February 21, 2007	Kitt Peak	Spacewatch	EOS	2.2 km	MPC · JPL
365996	2012 BZ_{90}	—	July 16, 2004	Cerro Tololo	Deep Ecliptic Survey	·	2.0 km	MPC · JPL
365997	2012 BE_{91}	—	December 21, 2006	Mount Lemmon	Mount Lemmon Survey	·	2.5 km	MPC · JPL
365998	2012 BP_{91}	—	September 24, 2000	Kitt Peak	Spacewatch	·	660 m	MPC · JPL
365999	2012 BZ_{94}	—	July 30, 2005	Palomar	NEAT	·	2.7 km	MPC · JPL
366000	2012 BA_{95}	—	March 12, 2007	Kitt Peak	Spacewatch	·	3.1 km	MPC · JPL

back to top

== See also ==
- Meanings of minor-planet names: 365001–366000
