= Meanings of minor-planet names: 362001–363000 =

As minor planet discoveries are confirmed, they are given a permanent number by the IAU's Minor Planet Center (MPC), and the discoverers can then submit names for them, following the IAU's naming conventions. The list below concerns those minor planets in the specified number-range that have received names, and explains the meanings of those names.

Official naming citations of newly named small Solar System bodies are approved and published in a bulletin by IAU's Working Group for Small Bodies Nomenclature (WGSBN). Before May 2021, citations were published in MPC's Minor Planet Circulars for many decades. Recent citations can also be found on the JPL Small-Body Database (SBDB). Until his death in 2016, German astronomer Lutz D. Schmadel compiled these citations into the Dictionary of Minor Planet Names (DMP) and regularly updated the collection.

Based on Paul Herget's The Names of the Minor Planets, Schmadel also researched the unclear origin of numerous asteroids, most of which had been named prior to World War II. This article incorporates text from this source, which is in the public domain: SBDB New namings may only be added to this list below after official publication as the preannouncement of names is condemned. The WGSBN publishes a comprehensive guideline for the naming rules of non-cometary small Solar System bodies.

== 362001–362100 ==
Named minor planet	Provisional	This minor planet was named for...	Ref · Catalog
There are no named minor planets in this number range

== 362101–362200 ==
back to top

Named minor planet	Provisional	This minor planet was named for...	Ref · Catalog
362177 Anji	2009 FA_{30}	Anji, a county in Huzhou, Zhejiang province, China.	JPL · 362177

== 362201–362300 ==
back to top

Named minor planet	Provisional	This minor planet was named for...	Ref · Catalog
362238 Shisseh	2009 KK_{2}	Taha Shisseh (born 1990) is a Moroccan geochemist and meteorites specialist at Hassan II University in Casablanca. The discoverer met him for the first time in June 2017 during the International Asteroid Day in Marrakech.	JPL · 362238

== 362301–362400 ==
back to top

Named minor planet	Provisional	This minor planet was named for...	Ref · Catalog
362316 Dogora	2009 VT_{44}	Étienne Perruchon (1958–2019), a French composer who wrote his first Dogorian songs in an imaginary language in 1996. He also created a popular work for mixed choir, children's choir and orchestra inspired by his Dogorian songs. The action of this drama had been transposed into Dogora, an imaginary central European country.	JPL · 362316

== 362401–362500 ==
back to top

Named minor planet	Provisional	This minor planet was named for...	Ref · Catalog
362420 Rolandgarros	2010 PY_{71}	Roland Garros (1888–1918), was a pioneering French aviator and World War I fighter pilot. The French Open tennis tournament takes its name from the Roland-Garros Stadium in which it is held.	IAU · 362420

== 362501–362600 ==
back to top

Named minor planet	Provisional	This minor planet was named for...	Ref · Catalog
There are no named minor planets in this number range

== 362601–362700 ==
back to top

Named minor planet	Provisional	This minor planet was named for...	Ref · Catalog
There are no named minor planets in this number range

== 362701–362800 ==
back to top

Named minor planet	Provisional	This minor planet was named for...	Ref · Catalog
362793 Suetolson	2011 WQ_{140}	Suzanne G. M. R. Tolson (1959–2013) was a human resources specialist at National Research Council Canada, both in Ottawa and at the Herzberg Institute of Astrophysics in Victoria.	JPL · 362793

== 362801–362900 ==
back to top

Named minor planet	Provisional	This minor planet was named for...	Ref · Catalog
There are no named minor planets in this number range

== 362901–363000 ==
back to top

Named minor planet	Provisional	This minor planet was named for...	Ref · Catalog
362911 Miguelhurtado	2012 CA_{34}	Miguel Hurtado (born 1978), one of the most enthusiastic OAM (Observatorio Astronómico de Mallorca) La Sagra team members.	JPL · 362911

back to top

Preceded by 361,001–362,000	Meanings of minor-planet names List of minor planets: 362,001–363,000	Succeeded by 363,001–364,000
