= List of minor planets: 362001–363000 =

The following is a partial list of minor planets, running from minor-planet number 362001 through 363000, inclusive. The primary data for this and other partial lists is based on JPL's "Small-Body Orbital Elements" and data available from the Minor Planet Center. Critical list information is also provided by the MPC, unless otherwise specified from Lowell Observatory. A detailed description of the table's columns and additional sources are given on the main page including a complete list of every page in this series, and a statistical break-up on the dynamical classification of minor planets.

Also see the summary list of all named bodies in numerical and alphabetical order, and the corresponding naming citations for the number range of this particular list. New namings may only be added to this list after official publication, as the preannouncement of names is condemned by the Working Group for Small Bodies Nomenclature of the International Astronomical Union.

Near-Earth obj.	MBA (inner)	MBA (outer)	Centaur
Mars-crosser	MBA (middle)	Jupiter trojan	Trans-Neptunian obj.
Unclassified

== 362001–362100 ==
Designation			Discovery			Properties		Ref
Permanent	Provisional	Named after	Date	Site	Discoverer(s)	Category	Diam.	Ref
362001	2008 UO_{43}	—	October 20, 2008	Mount Lemmon	Mount Lemmon Survey	·	680 m	MPC · JPL
362002	2008 UR_{112}	—	October 22, 2008	Kitt Peak	Spacewatch	·	850 m	MPC · JPL
362003	2008 UA_{132}	—	December 6, 2005	Kitt Peak	Spacewatch	·	510 m	MPC · JPL
362004	2008 UM_{144}	—	September 22, 2008	Mount Lemmon	Mount Lemmon Survey	·	710 m	MPC · JPL
362005	2008 UV_{363}	—	October 26, 2008	Catalina	CSS	PHO	1.2 km	MPC · JPL
362006	2008 UR_{369}	—	October 29, 2008	Kitt Peak	Spacewatch	·	720 m	MPC · JPL
362007	2008 VQ_{18}	—	November 1, 2008	Kitt Peak	Spacewatch	·	780 m	MPC · JPL
362008	2008 VZ_{55}	—	October 30, 2008	Kitt Peak	Spacewatch	·	810 m	MPC · JPL
362009	2008 VY_{69}	—	November 6, 2008	Mount Lemmon	Mount Lemmon Survey	·	490 m	MPC · JPL
362010	2008 VZ_{77}	—	November 7, 2008	Mount Lemmon	Mount Lemmon Survey	·	560 m	MPC · JPL
362011	2008 WJ_{74}	—	November 19, 2008	Mount Lemmon	Mount Lemmon Survey	·	740 m	MPC · JPL
362012	2008 WQ_{106}	—	October 3, 2008	Mount Lemmon	Mount Lemmon Survey	·	800 m	MPC · JPL
362013	2008 WX_{120}	—	November 30, 2008	Kitt Peak	Spacewatch	·	820 m	MPC · JPL
362014	2008 WB_{126}	—	November 24, 2008	Mount Lemmon	Mount Lemmon Survey	NYS	960 m	MPC · JPL
362015	2008 WN_{126}	—	November 18, 2008	Kitt Peak	Spacewatch	·	950 m	MPC · JPL
362016	2008 WB_{129}	—	November 20, 2008	Mount Lemmon	Mount Lemmon Survey	·	930 m	MPC · JPL
362017	2008 WQ_{140}	—	October 25, 2008	Kitt Peak	Spacewatch	·	800 m	MPC · JPL
362018	2008 YY_{12}	—	December 21, 2008	Kitt Peak	Spacewatch	·	1.2 km	MPC · JPL
362019	2008 YA_{17}	—	December 21, 2008	Mount Lemmon	Mount Lemmon Survey	MAS	740 m	MPC · JPL
362020	2008 YR_{18}	—	December 21, 2008	Kitt Peak	Spacewatch	V	740 m	MPC · JPL
362021	2008 YY_{21}	—	December 21, 2008	Mount Lemmon	Mount Lemmon Survey	PHO	1.1 km	MPC · JPL
362022	2008 YF_{22}	—	December 21, 2008	Mount Lemmon	Mount Lemmon Survey	·	860 m	MPC · JPL
362023	2008 YD_{38}	—	December 29, 2008	Kitt Peak	Spacewatch	·	1.1 km	MPC · JPL
362024	2008 YJ_{52}	—	December 29, 2008	Mount Lemmon	Mount Lemmon Survey	ERI	2.3 km	MPC · JPL
362025	2008 YR_{62}	—	December 30, 2008	Mount Lemmon	Mount Lemmon Survey	·	900 m	MPC · JPL
362026	2008 YE_{69}	—	December 22, 2008	Mount Lemmon	Mount Lemmon Survey	·	2.4 km	MPC · JPL
362027	2008 YA_{73}	—	December 30, 2008	Kitt Peak	Spacewatch	·	850 m	MPC · JPL
362028	2008 YT_{95}	—	September 23, 1997	Kitt Peak	Spacewatch	·	620 m	MPC · JPL
362029	2008 YP_{99}	—	December 29, 2008	Kitt Peak	Spacewatch	NYS	860 m	MPC · JPL
362030	2008 YH_{100}	—	December 29, 2008	Kitt Peak	Spacewatch	·	880 m	MPC · JPL
362031	2008 YS_{121}	—	December 30, 2008	Kitt Peak	Spacewatch	·	1.1 km	MPC · JPL
362032	2008 YK_{141}	—	October 24, 2008	Mount Lemmon	Mount Lemmon Survey	·	820 m	MPC · JPL
362033	2008 YV_{143}	—	December 30, 2008	Kitt Peak	Spacewatch	·	940 m	MPC · JPL
362034	2008 YD_{146}	—	December 30, 2008	Kitt Peak	Spacewatch	·	1.2 km	MPC · JPL
362035	2008 YZ_{146}	—	December 31, 2008	Kitt Peak	Spacewatch	·	740 m	MPC · JPL
362036	2008 YO_{160}	—	December 29, 2008	Kitt Peak	Spacewatch	MAR	1.1 km	MPC · JPL
362037	2008 YX_{167}	—	October 7, 2004	Kitt Peak	Spacewatch	·	890 m	MPC · JPL
362038	2009 AG_{2}	—	January 3, 2009	Sandlot	G. Hug	V	710 m	MPC · JPL
362039	2009 AB_{22}	—	November 7, 2008	Mount Lemmon	Mount Lemmon Survey	·	1.1 km	MPC · JPL
362040	2009 AA_{26}	—	January 2, 2009	Kitt Peak	Spacewatch	·	830 m	MPC · JPL
362041	2009 AR_{38}	—	January 15, 2009	Kitt Peak	Spacewatch	·	920 m	MPC · JPL
362042	2009 BB_{4}	—	January 18, 2009	Socorro	LINEAR	·	980 m	MPC · JPL
362043	2009 BE_{4}	—	January 18, 2009	Socorro	LINEAR	·	1.2 km	MPC · JPL
362044	2009 BC_{5}	—	December 22, 1998	Kitt Peak	Spacewatch	·	950 m	MPC · JPL
362045	2009 BE_{9}	—	January 17, 2009	Socorro	LINEAR	·	1.1 km	MPC · JPL
362046	2009 BH_{9}	—	January 18, 2009	Socorro	LINEAR	PHO	1.2 km	MPC · JPL
362047	2009 BG_{14}	—	January 17, 2009	Mount Lemmon	Mount Lemmon Survey	·	1.3 km	MPC · JPL
362048	2009 BM_{16}	—	January 16, 2009	Kitt Peak	Spacewatch	NYS	1.3 km	MPC · JPL
362049	2009 BK_{38}	—	January 16, 2009	Kitt Peak	Spacewatch	·	1.2 km	MPC · JPL
362050	2009 BB_{39}	—	January 16, 2009	Kitt Peak	Spacewatch	MAS	620 m	MPC · JPL
362051	2009 BJ_{39}	—	January 16, 2009	Kitt Peak	Spacewatch	·	1.1 km	MPC · JPL
362052	2009 BW_{42}	—	January 16, 2009	Kitt Peak	Spacewatch	MAS	660 m	MPC · JPL
362053	2009 BF_{43}	—	January 16, 2009	Kitt Peak	Spacewatch	·	1.0 km	MPC · JPL
362054	2009 BH_{43}	—	January 16, 2009	Kitt Peak	Spacewatch	·	1.0 km	MPC · JPL
362055	2009 BQ_{45}	—	January 16, 2009	Kitt Peak	Spacewatch	·	1.1 km	MPC · JPL
362056	2009 BS_{46}	—	January 16, 2009	Kitt Peak	Spacewatch	NYS	1.1 km	MPC · JPL
362057	2009 BF_{51}	—	November 23, 2008	Mount Lemmon	Mount Lemmon Survey	·	1.2 km	MPC · JPL
362058	2009 BJ_{51}	—	January 16, 2009	Kitt Peak	Spacewatch	V	810 m	MPC · JPL
362059	2009 BZ_{51}	—	January 16, 2009	Mount Lemmon	Mount Lemmon Survey	·	1.2 km	MPC · JPL
362060	2009 BQ_{52}	—	January 16, 2009	Mount Lemmon	Mount Lemmon Survey	MAS	780 m	MPC · JPL
362061	2009 BP_{53}	—	January 16, 2009	Mount Lemmon	Mount Lemmon Survey	MAS	570 m	MPC · JPL
362062	2009 BS_{54}	—	December 30, 2008	Mount Lemmon	Mount Lemmon Survey	MAS	680 m	MPC · JPL
362063	2009 BZ_{57}	—	January 20, 2009	Kitt Peak	Spacewatch	·	1.7 km	MPC · JPL
362064	2009 BZ_{60}	—	December 3, 2008	Mount Lemmon	Mount Lemmon Survey	·	1.2 km	MPC · JPL
362065	2009 BN_{62}	—	January 19, 2009	Mount Lemmon	Mount Lemmon Survey	·	1.5 km	MPC · JPL
362066	2009 BP_{62}	—	January 20, 2009	Kitt Peak	Spacewatch	·	1.0 km	MPC · JPL
362067	2009 BE_{63}	—	December 29, 2008	Mount Lemmon	Mount Lemmon Survey	·	1.1 km	MPC · JPL
362068	2009 BT_{67}	—	December 30, 2008	Mount Lemmon	Mount Lemmon Survey	·	1.3 km	MPC · JPL
362069	2009 BU_{71}	—	January 22, 2009	Dauban	Kugel, F.	NYS	1.3 km	MPC · JPL
362070	2009 BY_{72}	—	January 29, 2009	Dauban	Kugel, F.	·	1.4 km	MPC · JPL
362071	2009 BD_{76}	—	January 25, 2009	Bergisch Gladbach	W. Bickel	·	1.5 km	MPC · JPL
362072	2009 BX_{80}	—	January 31, 2009	Kachina	Hobart, J.	·	1.4 km	MPC · JPL
362073	2009 BU_{85}	—	January 25, 2009	Kitt Peak	Spacewatch	MAS	690 m	MPC · JPL
362074	2009 BJ_{88}	—	January 25, 2009	Kitt Peak	Spacewatch	MAS	740 m	MPC · JPL
362075	2009 BE_{91}	—	January 15, 2009	Kitt Peak	Spacewatch	NYS	1.0 km	MPC · JPL
362076	2009 BC_{94}	—	January 25, 2009	Kitt Peak	Spacewatch	·	1.2 km	MPC · JPL
362077	2009 BF_{106}	—	January 25, 2009	Kitt Peak	Spacewatch	·	1.3 km	MPC · JPL
362078	2009 BD_{111}	—	January 25, 2009	Kitt Peak	Spacewatch	·	1.2 km	MPC · JPL
362079	2009 BG_{111}	—	January 26, 2009	Purple Mountain	PMO NEO Survey Program	·	1.4 km	MPC · JPL
362080	2009 BF_{123}	—	January 31, 2009	Kitt Peak	Spacewatch	·	1.0 km	MPC · JPL
362081	2009 BV_{123}	—	January 31, 2009	Kitt Peak	Spacewatch	MAS	540 m	MPC · JPL
362082	2009 BN_{125}	—	January 26, 2009	Purple Mountain	PMO NEO Survey Program	·	1.0 km	MPC · JPL
362083	2009 BL_{127}	—	January 15, 2009	Kitt Peak	Spacewatch	MAS	630 m	MPC · JPL
362084	2009 BW_{128}	—	January 29, 2009	Mount Lemmon	Mount Lemmon Survey	·	1.4 km	MPC · JPL
362085	2009 BX_{128}	—	January 29, 2009	Mount Lemmon	Mount Lemmon Survey	·	1.4 km	MPC · JPL
362086	2009 BY_{130}	—	January 31, 2009	Mount Lemmon	Mount Lemmon Survey	·	1.3 km	MPC · JPL
362087	2009 BW_{138}	—	January 29, 2009	Kitt Peak	Spacewatch	MAS	740 m	MPC · JPL
362088	2009 BP_{145}	—	January 20, 2009	Kitt Peak	Spacewatch	MAS	680 m	MPC · JPL
362089	2009 BM_{148}	—	January 30, 2009	Mount Lemmon	Mount Lemmon Survey	·	1.2 km	MPC · JPL
362090	2009 BH_{149}	—	January 31, 2009	Kitt Peak	Spacewatch	MAS	660 m	MPC · JPL
362091	2009 BP_{159}	—	January 31, 2009	Kitt Peak	Spacewatch	·	1.7 km	MPC · JPL
362092	2009 BT_{172}	—	January 18, 2009	Catalina	CSS	·	1.6 km	MPC · JPL
362093	2009 BA_{180}	—	January 21, 2009	Mount Lemmon	Mount Lemmon Survey	·	1.0 km	MPC · JPL
362094	2009 BA_{181}	—	January 31, 2009	Mount Lemmon	Mount Lemmon Survey	·	1.0 km	MPC · JPL
362095	2009 BB_{182}	—	January 17, 2009	Mount Lemmon	Mount Lemmon Survey	NYS	1.0 km	MPC · JPL
362096	2009 BG_{184}	—	January 16, 2009	Kitt Peak	Spacewatch	V	710 m	MPC · JPL
362097	2009 BN_{185}	—	May 8, 2006	Mount Lemmon	Mount Lemmon Survey	·	1.6 km	MPC · JPL
362098	2009 BS_{186}	—	January 21, 2009	Bergisch Gladbach	W. Bickel	·	1.2 km	MPC · JPL
362099	2009 BJ_{189}	—	January 17, 2009	Mount Lemmon	Mount Lemmon Survey	·	1.2 km	MPC · JPL
362100	2009 BF_{190}	—	January 25, 2009	Kitt Peak	Spacewatch	·	1.1 km	MPC · JPL

== 362101–362200 ==
back to top

Designation			Discovery			Properties		Ref
Permanent	Provisional	Named after	Date	Site	Discoverer(s)	Category	Diam.	Ref
362101	2009 CK_{3}	—	February 2, 2009	Sierra Stars	Dillon, W. G., Wells, D.	MAS	750 m	MPC · JPL
362102	2009 CV_{20}	—	February 1, 2009	Kitt Peak	Spacewatch	(2076)	940 m	MPC · JPL
362103	2009 CO_{22}	—	February 1, 2009	Kitt Peak	Spacewatch	·	1.1 km	MPC · JPL
362104	2009 CF_{23}	—	February 1, 2009	Kitt Peak	Spacewatch	·	1.1 km	MPC · JPL
362105	2009 CK_{23}	—	February 1, 2009	Kitt Peak	Spacewatch	NYS	960 m	MPC · JPL
362106	2009 CK_{25}	—	February 1, 2009	Kitt Peak	Spacewatch	·	1.0 km	MPC · JPL
362107	2009 CQ_{25}	—	February 1, 2009	Kitt Peak	Spacewatch	·	1.0 km	MPC · JPL
362108	2009 CD_{27}	—	February 1, 2009	Kitt Peak	Spacewatch	V	770 m	MPC · JPL
362109	2009 CB_{32}	—	January 17, 2005	Kitt Peak	Spacewatch	·	1.1 km	MPC · JPL
362110	2009 CG_{33}	—	February 1, 2009	Kitt Peak	Spacewatch	·	1.0 km	MPC · JPL
362111	2009 CR_{39}	—	February 14, 2009	Dauban	Kugel, F.	·	1.5 km	MPC · JPL
362112	2009 CT_{47}	—	February 14, 2009	Kitt Peak	Spacewatch	PHO	1.1 km	MPC · JPL
362113	2009 CN_{56}	—	February 3, 2009	Kitt Peak	Spacewatch	·	1.4 km	MPC · JPL
362114	2009 CZ_{56}	—	February 5, 2009	Catalina	CSS	·	1.3 km	MPC · JPL
362115	2009 CV_{58}	—	February 4, 2009	Kitt Peak	Spacewatch	MAS	760 m	MPC · JPL
362116	2009 CW_{58}	—	February 4, 2009	Mount Lemmon	Mount Lemmon Survey	·	2.1 km	MPC · JPL
362117	2009 CE_{63}	—	February 1, 2009	Mount Lemmon	Mount Lemmon Survey	·	1.3 km	MPC · JPL
362118	2009 CP_{63}	—	February 3, 2009	Mount Lemmon	Mount Lemmon Survey	NYS	1.0 km	MPC · JPL
362119	2009 CP_{65}	—	October 15, 2004	Kitt Peak	Spacewatch	NYS	920 m	MPC · JPL
362120	2009 DV_{2}	—	February 17, 2009	Cordell-Lorenz	D. T. Durig	·	1.2 km	MPC · JPL
362121	2009 DY_{6}	—	February 17, 2009	Kitt Peak	Spacewatch	·	1.4 km	MPC · JPL
362122	2009 DD_{12}	—	February 18, 2009	Taunus	Karge, S., R. Kling	MAS	680 m	MPC · JPL
362123	2009 DG_{13}	—	February 16, 2009	Kitt Peak	Spacewatch	·	1.4 km	MPC · JPL
362124	2009 DJ_{13}	—	February 16, 2009	Kitt Peak	Spacewatch	·	1.5 km	MPC · JPL
362125	2009 DU_{15}	—	February 16, 2009	La Sagra	OAM	·	1.1 km	MPC · JPL
362126	2009 DJ_{23}	—	February 19, 2009	Kitt Peak	Spacewatch	·	1.5 km	MPC · JPL
362127	2009 DM_{25}	—	February 21, 2009	Mount Lemmon	Mount Lemmon Survey	MAS	800 m	MPC · JPL
362128	2009 DC_{29}	—	February 23, 2009	Calar Alto	F. Hormuth	·	1.2 km	MPC · JPL
362129	2009 DL_{32}	—	February 20, 2009	Kitt Peak	Spacewatch	MAS	810 m	MPC · JPL
362130	2009 DO_{40}	—	February 21, 2009	Mount Lemmon	Mount Lemmon Survey	MAS	800 m	MPC · JPL
362131	2009 DW_{42}	—	February 20, 2009	Calvin-Rehoboth	Calvin College	·	1.0 km	MPC · JPL
362132	2009 DM_{47}	—	February 28, 2009	Socorro	LINEAR	·	1.1 km	MPC · JPL
362133	2009 DT_{60}	—	February 22, 2009	Kitt Peak	Spacewatch	·	1.3 km	MPC · JPL
362134	2009 DW_{63}	—	February 22, 2009	Kitt Peak	Spacewatch	·	1.3 km	MPC · JPL
362135	2009 DA_{70}	—	February 26, 2009	Catalina	CSS	NYS	1.3 km	MPC · JPL
362136	2009 DC_{80}	—	February 21, 2009	Kitt Peak	Spacewatch	·	1.8 km	MPC · JPL
362137	2009 DZ_{80}	—	February 24, 2009	Kitt Peak	Spacewatch	NYS	1.4 km	MPC · JPL
362138	2009 DY_{81}	—	February 24, 2009	Kitt Peak	Spacewatch	·	1.6 km	MPC · JPL
362139	2009 DD_{83}	—	February 24, 2009	Kitt Peak	Spacewatch	·	1.3 km	MPC · JPL
362140	2009 DH_{84}	—	February 26, 2009	Kitt Peak	Spacewatch	·	1.6 km	MPC · JPL
362141	2009 DH_{85}	—	February 27, 2009	Kitt Peak	Spacewatch	·	800 m	MPC · JPL
362142	2009 DU_{87}	—	August 28, 2006	Kitt Peak	Spacewatch	MAR	1.2 km	MPC · JPL
362143	2009 DL_{93}	—	February 28, 2009	Mount Lemmon	Mount Lemmon Survey	NYS	1.4 km	MPC · JPL
362144	2009 DS_{97}	—	February 26, 2009	Kitt Peak	Spacewatch	·	1.4 km	MPC · JPL
362145	2009 DV_{97}	—	February 4, 2009	Mount Lemmon	Mount Lemmon Survey	·	1.3 km	MPC · JPL
362146	2009 DH_{99}	—	February 26, 2009	Kitt Peak	Spacewatch	·	1.2 km	MPC · JPL
362147	2009 DF_{109}	—	February 27, 2009	Catalina	CSS	·	1.8 km	MPC · JPL
362148	2009 DS_{111}	—	February 26, 2009	Calar Alto	F. Hormuth	·	1.7 km	MPC · JPL
362149	2009 DF_{119}	—	August 19, 1995	Xinglong	SCAP	·	1.8 km	MPC · JPL
362150	2009 DD_{120}	—	February 27, 2009	Kitt Peak	Spacewatch	·	1.2 km	MPC · JPL
362151	2009 DD_{121}	—	February 27, 2009	Kitt Peak	Spacewatch	·	1.2 km	MPC · JPL
362152	2009 DZ_{123}	—	February 19, 2009	Catalina	CSS	·	1.3 km	MPC · JPL
362153	2009 DT_{124}	—	February 19, 2009	Kitt Peak	Spacewatch	·	1.3 km	MPC · JPL
362154	2009 DN_{127}	—	February 20, 2009	Kitt Peak	Spacewatch	NYS	1.5 km	MPC · JPL
362155	2009 DO_{127}	—	February 20, 2009	Kitt Peak	Spacewatch	·	2.1 km	MPC · JPL
362156	2009 DJ_{133}	—	February 27, 2009	Kitt Peak	Spacewatch	·	1.7 km	MPC · JPL
362157	2009 DK_{134}	—	February 28, 2009	Kitt Peak	Spacewatch	·	1.3 km	MPC · JPL
362158	2009 DE_{135}	—	November 7, 2007	Kitt Peak	Spacewatch	·	1.2 km	MPC · JPL
362159	2009 DL_{136}	—	February 28, 2009	Kitt Peak	Spacewatch	JUN	1.1 km	MPC · JPL
362160	2009 DN_{141}	—	April 12, 2002	Palomar	NEAT	MAS	790 m	MPC · JPL
362161	2009 DZ_{141}	—	February 21, 2009	Socorro	LINEAR	·	3.0 km	MPC · JPL
362162	2009 EL_{1}	—	March 2, 2009	Catalina	CSS	·	3.9 km	MPC · JPL
362163	2009 EZ_{4}	—	January 13, 2005	Kitt Peak	Spacewatch	MAS	770 m	MPC · JPL
362164	2009 EA_{8}	—	March 2, 2009	Mount Lemmon	Mount Lemmon Survey	ERI	1.5 km	MPC · JPL
362165	2009 EG_{12}	—	March 1, 2009	Mount Lemmon	Mount Lemmon Survey	·	1.4 km	MPC · JPL
362166	2009 EW_{17}	—	March 15, 2009	Kitt Peak	Spacewatch	·	1.2 km	MPC · JPL
362167	2009 EA_{23}	—	March 3, 2009	Kitt Peak	Spacewatch	·	950 m	MPC · JPL
362168	2009 EE_{23}	—	March 3, 2009	Mount Lemmon	Mount Lemmon Survey	NYS	1.1 km	MPC · JPL
362169	2009 FU_{3}	—	March 18, 2009	La Sagra	OAM	NYS	1.2 km	MPC · JPL
362170	2009 FK_{11}	—	February 2, 2005	Kitt Peak	Spacewatch	·	980 m	MPC · JPL
362171	2009 FR_{12}	—	March 18, 2009	Mount Lemmon	Mount Lemmon Survey	·	1.2 km	MPC · JPL
362172	2009 FD_{15}	—	March 16, 2009	Kitt Peak	Spacewatch	·	1.1 km	MPC · JPL
362173	2009 FX_{20}	—	March 18, 2009	Mount Lemmon	Mount Lemmon Survey	·	1.2 km	MPC · JPL
362174	2009 FY_{20}	—	March 19, 2009	Kitt Peak	Spacewatch	·	1.1 km	MPC · JPL
362175	2009 FB_{21}	—	March 19, 2009	Mount Lemmon	Mount Lemmon Survey	·	1.2 km	MPC · JPL
362176	2009 FP_{21}	—	March 22, 2009	Vicques	M. Ory	·	1.4 km	MPC · JPL
362177 Anji	2009 FA_{30}	Anji	March 21, 2009	Lulin	T. Chen	MAS	740 m	MPC · JPL
362178	2009 FV_{31}	—	March 24, 2009	Sierra Stars	Dillon, W. G., Wells, D.	·	890 m	MPC · JPL
362179	2009 FM_{33}	—	March 24, 2009	Mount Lemmon	Mount Lemmon Survey	·	1.3 km	MPC · JPL
362180	2009 FD_{34}	—	March 21, 2009	Catalina	CSS	MAS	780 m	MPC · JPL
362181	2009 FN_{51}	—	March 28, 2009	Mount Lemmon	Mount Lemmon Survey	·	1.4 km	MPC · JPL
362182	2009 FV_{61}	—	March 18, 2009	Kitt Peak	Spacewatch	RAF	760 m	MPC · JPL
362183	2009 FM_{62}	—	March 23, 2009	Purple Mountain	PMO NEO Survey Program	·	1.3 km	MPC · JPL
362184	2009 FZ_{64}	—	March 17, 2009	Kitt Peak	Spacewatch	·	2.6 km	MPC · JPL
362185	2009 FR_{66}	—	February 24, 2009	Kitt Peak	Spacewatch	KON	2.3 km	MPC · JPL
362186	2009 FF_{67}	—	March 19, 2009	Calar Alto	F. Hormuth	·	1.3 km	MPC · JPL
362187	2009 FO_{70}	—	March 21, 2009	Kitt Peak	Spacewatch	·	1.6 km	MPC · JPL
362188	2009 FP_{72}	—	March 18, 2009	Kitt Peak	Spacewatch	·	1.4 km	MPC · JPL
362189	2009 FT_{72}	—	March 18, 2009	Mount Lemmon	Mount Lemmon Survey	·	1.4 km	MPC · JPL
362190	2009 FT_{75}	—	March 21, 2009	Kitt Peak	Spacewatch	·	1.3 km	MPC · JPL
362191	2009 FJ_{77}	—	March 19, 2009	Mount Lemmon	Mount Lemmon Survey	CLA	1.8 km	MPC · JPL
362192	2009 FM_{77}	—	March 26, 2009	Kitt Peak	Spacewatch	·	1.7 km	MPC · JPL
362193	2009 GK_{1}	—	April 3, 2009	Cerro Burek	Burek, Cerro	MAR	1.3 km	MPC · JPL
362194	2009 HY_{3}	—	April 17, 2009	Kitt Peak	Spacewatch	·	1.3 km	MPC · JPL
362195	2009 HQ_{6}	—	April 17, 2009	Kitt Peak	Spacewatch	·	1.4 km	MPC · JPL
362196	2009 HE_{9}	—	April 17, 2009	Mount Lemmon	Mount Lemmon Survey	·	2.8 km	MPC · JPL
362197	2009 HD_{15}	—	April 18, 2009	Kitt Peak	Spacewatch	·	1.3 km	MPC · JPL
362198	2009 HC_{18}	—	April 18, 2009	Catalina	CSS	·	1.6 km	MPC · JPL
362199	2009 HU_{18}	—	April 19, 2009	Kitt Peak	Spacewatch	·	2.5 km	MPC · JPL
362200	2009 HX_{21}	—	April 16, 2009	Catalina	CSS	·	1.7 km	MPC · JPL

== 362201–362300 ==
back to top

Designation			Discovery			Properties		Ref
Permanent	Provisional	Named after	Date	Site	Discoverer(s)	Category	Diam.	Ref
362201	2009 HV_{27}	—	April 18, 2009	Kitt Peak	Spacewatch	·	1.3 km	MPC · JPL
362202	2009 HW_{28}	—	April 18, 2009	Mount Lemmon	Mount Lemmon Survey	·	1.2 km	MPC · JPL
362203	2009 HJ_{31}	—	November 17, 2007	Catalina	CSS	·	1.4 km	MPC · JPL
362204	2009 HN_{31}	—	January 30, 2008	Mount Lemmon	Mount Lemmon Survey	·	2.1 km	MPC · JPL
362205	2009 HB_{34}	—	April 19, 2009	Mount Lemmon	Mount Lemmon Survey	·	1.5 km	MPC · JPL
362206	2009 HZ_{42}	—	April 20, 2009	Kitt Peak	Spacewatch	·	1.0 km	MPC · JPL
362207	2009 HB_{43}	—	April 20, 2009	Kitt Peak	Spacewatch	·	1.2 km	MPC · JPL
362208	2009 HQ_{44}	—	April 21, 2009	Kitt Peak	Spacewatch	·	2.8 km	MPC · JPL
362209	2009 HG_{48}	—	April 19, 2009	Kitt Peak	Spacewatch	·	1.6 km	MPC · JPL
362210	2009 HS_{48}	—	April 19, 2009	Catalina	CSS	·	1.5 km	MPC · JPL
362211	2009 HK_{51}	—	April 21, 2009	Kitt Peak	Spacewatch	EUN	1.4 km	MPC · JPL
362212	2009 HL_{59}	—	April 21, 2009	Socorro	LINEAR	·	1.5 km	MPC · JPL
362213	2009 HK_{62}	—	April 21, 2009	Kitt Peak	Spacewatch	·	2.6 km	MPC · JPL
362214	2009 HL_{65}	—	April 23, 2009	Kitt Peak	Spacewatch	·	1.3 km	MPC · JPL
362215	2009 HH_{66}	—	April 23, 2009	Kitt Peak	Spacewatch	JUN	1.2 km	MPC · JPL
362216	2009 HL_{66}	—	April 23, 2009	Kitt Peak	Spacewatch	·	1.8 km	MPC · JPL
362217	2009 HB_{73}	—	April 18, 2009	Kitt Peak	Spacewatch	·	1.4 km	MPC · JPL
362218	2009 HJ_{73}	—	March 21, 2009	Catalina	CSS	·	1.8 km	MPC · JPL
362219	2009 HP_{75}	—	April 28, 2009	Catalina	CSS	·	1.4 km	MPC · JPL
362220	2009 HV_{78}	—	April 26, 2009	Kitt Peak	Spacewatch	·	1.3 km	MPC · JPL
362221	2009 HW_{78}	—	April 26, 2009	Kitt Peak	Spacewatch	PHO	1.4 km	MPC · JPL
362222	2009 HD_{79}	—	April 26, 2009	Kitt Peak	Spacewatch	EUN	1.1 km	MPC · JPL
362223	2009 HD_{86}	—	April 29, 2009	Mount Lemmon	Mount Lemmon Survey	RAF	790 m	MPC · JPL
362224	2009 HH_{88}	—	April 23, 2009	La Sagra	OAM	·	3.4 km	MPC · JPL
362225	2009 HG_{90}	—	April 19, 2009	Mount Lemmon	Mount Lemmon Survey	EUN	1.1 km	MPC · JPL
362226	2009 HP_{93}	—	April 30, 2009	Kitt Peak	Spacewatch	EUN	1.4 km	MPC · JPL
362227	2009 HW_{93}	—	April 30, 2009	Kitt Peak	Spacewatch	·	1.9 km	MPC · JPL
362228	2009 HQ_{96}	—	April 18, 2009	Kitt Peak	Spacewatch	EUN	1.4 km	MPC · JPL
362229	2009 HU_{97}	—	April 18, 2009	Kitt Peak	Spacewatch	·	1.4 km	MPC · JPL
362230	2009 HD_{98}	—	April 19, 2009	Kitt Peak	Spacewatch	·	1.8 km	MPC · JPL
362231	2009 HT_{102}	—	April 24, 2009	Kitt Peak	Spacewatch	·	1.8 km	MPC · JPL
362232	2009 JL	—	May 2, 2009	La Sagra	OAM	·	1.9 km	MPC · JPL
362233	2009 JX_{1}	—	May 1, 2009	Kitt Peak	Spacewatch	·	2.1 km	MPC · JPL
362234	2009 JM_{5}	—	May 14, 2009	Kitt Peak	Spacewatch	·	2.0 km	MPC · JPL
362235	2009 JN_{7}	—	May 13, 2009	Kitt Peak	Spacewatch	·	1.6 km	MPC · JPL
362236	2009 KO_{1}	—	May 16, 2009	La Sagra	OAM	EUN	1.5 km	MPC · JPL
362237	2009 KP_{1}	—	April 30, 2009	Kitt Peak	Spacewatch	·	1.7 km	MPC · JPL
362238 Shisseh	2009 KK_{2}	Shisseh	May 19, 2009	Vicques	M. Ory	EUN	1.4 km	MPC · JPL
362239	2009 KS_{4}	—	April 21, 2009	Kitt Peak	Spacewatch	EUN	1.5 km	MPC · JPL
362240	2009 KD_{6}	—	May 25, 2009	Mount Lemmon	Mount Lemmon Survey	·	1.6 km	MPC · JPL
362241	2009 KO_{7}	—	May 19, 2009	Tzec Maun	Tozzi, F.	·	1.5 km	MPC · JPL
362242	2009 KB_{8}	—	May 28, 2009	Pla D'Arguines	R. Ferrando	·	2.0 km	MPC · JPL
362243	2009 KF_{9}	—	May 19, 2005	Mount Lemmon	Mount Lemmon Survey	·	1.1 km	MPC · JPL
362244	2009 KZ_{10}	—	April 20, 2009	Kitt Peak	Spacewatch	EUN	1.3 km	MPC · JPL
362245	2009 KD_{15}	—	May 26, 2009	Catalina	CSS	·	1.4 km	MPC · JPL
362246	2009 KY_{16}	—	May 26, 2009	Kitt Peak	Spacewatch	·	1.2 km	MPC · JPL
362247	2009 KO_{17}	—	April 19, 2009	Kitt Peak	Spacewatch	·	1.7 km	MPC · JPL
362248	2009 KV_{23}	—	May 27, 2009	Kitt Peak	Spacewatch	·	1.3 km	MPC · JPL
362249	2009 KJ_{24}	—	May 27, 2009	Kitt Peak	Spacewatch	HNS	1.2 km	MPC · JPL
362250	2009 KN_{24}	—	May 27, 2009	Kitt Peak	Spacewatch	ADE	2.3 km	MPC · JPL
362251	2009 KJ_{26}	—	May 29, 2009	Mount Lemmon	Mount Lemmon Survey	·	2.9 km	MPC · JPL
362252	2009 LV	—	June 11, 2009	La Sagra	OAM	·	2.8 km	MPC · JPL
362253	2009 LW	—	June 11, 2009	La Sagra	OAM	·	1.7 km	MPC · JPL
362254	2009 LG_{5}	—	June 15, 2009	Kitt Peak	Spacewatch	·	2.5 km	MPC · JPL
362255	2009 LF_{6}	—	June 15, 2009	Mount Lemmon	Mount Lemmon Survey	JUN	1.3 km	MPC · JPL
362256	2009 MT_{1}	—	May 2, 2009	Siding Spring	SSS	·	1.7 km	MPC · JPL
362257	2009 MX_{9}	—	June 24, 2009	Mount Lemmon	Mount Lemmon Survey	EMA	3.5 km	MPC · JPL
362258	2009 NT_{1}	—	July 15, 2009	La Sagra	OAM	·	1.7 km	MPC · JPL
362259	2009 NV_{1}	—	July 14, 2009	Cerro Burek	Burek, Cerro	(43176)	3.5 km	MPC · JPL
362260	2009 OE_{3}	—	July 19, 2009	La Sagra	OAM	·	1.9 km	MPC · JPL
362261	2009 OG_{4}	—	May 14, 2008	Mount Lemmon	Mount Lemmon Survey	·	3.7 km	MPC · JPL
362262	2009 ON_{5}	—	July 25, 2009	Marly	P. Kocher	·	1.8 km	MPC · JPL
362263	2009 OZ_{10}	—	July 28, 2009	Catalina	CSS	·	3.4 km	MPC · JPL
362264	2009 OP_{25}	—	April 1, 2008	Kitt Peak	Spacewatch	EOS	1.8 km	MPC · JPL
362265	2009 PT_{4}	—	August 15, 2009	Catalina	CSS	·	4.8 km	MPC · JPL
362266	2009 PN_{5}	—	August 15, 2009	Črni Vrh	Skvarč, J.	·	4.5 km	MPC · JPL
362267	2009 PO_{5}	—	August 15, 2009	Črni Vrh	Skvarč, J.	·	3.8 km	MPC · JPL
362268	2009 PT_{12}	—	August 15, 2009	Kitt Peak	Spacewatch	·	3.5 km	MPC · JPL
362269	2009 PV_{18}	—	August 15, 2009	Kitt Peak	Spacewatch	·	3.1 km	MPC · JPL
362270	2009 PH_{19}	—	August 15, 2009	Kitt Peak	Spacewatch	VER	2.9 km	MPC · JPL
362271	2009 PY_{20}	—	August 15, 2009	Kitt Peak	Spacewatch	·	3.2 km	MPC · JPL
362272	2009 QC_{5}	—	August 16, 2009	La Sagra	OAM	·	2.0 km	MPC · JPL
362273	2009 QZ_{12}	—	August 16, 2009	Kitt Peak	Spacewatch	HYG	3.3 km	MPC · JPL
362274	2009 QE_{24}	—	August 16, 2009	Kitt Peak	Spacewatch	·	3.6 km	MPC · JPL
362275	2009 QU_{34}	—	August 28, 2009	Plana	Fratev, F.	·	3.5 km	MPC · JPL
362276	2009 QJ_{39}	—	August 20, 2009	Kitt Peak	Spacewatch	·	2.5 km	MPC · JPL
362277	2009 QY_{50}	—	March 12, 2007	Kitt Peak	Spacewatch	·	3.9 km	MPC · JPL
362278	2009 QG_{54}	—	August 20, 2009	Catalina	CSS	·	4.4 km	MPC · JPL
362279	2009 RK_{9}	—	September 12, 2009	Kitt Peak	Spacewatch	VER	3.4 km	MPC · JPL
362280	2009 RB_{15}	—	September 12, 2009	Kitt Peak	Spacewatch	TIR	3.0 km	MPC · JPL
362281	2009 RV_{21}	—	October 4, 2004	Kitt Peak	Spacewatch	·	3.4 km	MPC · JPL
362282	2009 RM_{26}	—	September 13, 2009	Socorro	LINEAR	·	3.5 km	MPC · JPL
362283	2009 RK_{27}	—	September 12, 2009	Kitt Peak	Spacewatch	·	4.3 km	MPC · JPL
362284	2009 SL_{6}	—	September 16, 2009	Mount Lemmon	Mount Lemmon Survey	·	2.5 km	MPC · JPL
362285	2009 SO_{8}	—	September 16, 2009	Catalina	CSS	·	4.9 km	MPC · JPL
362286	2009 SO_{12}	—	September 16, 2009	Mount Lemmon	Mount Lemmon Survey	·	3.3 km	MPC · JPL
362287	2009 SS_{78}	—	February 17, 2007	Mount Lemmon	Mount Lemmon Survey	·	4.0 km	MPC · JPL
362288	2009 SE_{99}	—	September 11, 2002	Palomar	NEAT	CYB	4.8 km	MPC · JPL
362289	2009 SG_{115}	—	September 18, 2009	Kitt Peak	Spacewatch	·	3.2 km	MPC · JPL
362290	2009 SR_{178}	—	September 20, 2009	Mount Lemmon	Mount Lemmon Survey	·	3.0 km	MPC · JPL
362291	2009 SR_{225}	—	August 18, 2009	Kitt Peak	Spacewatch	CYB	3.7 km	MPC · JPL
362292	2009 SU_{229}	—	September 16, 2009	Kitt Peak	Spacewatch	·	3.4 km	MPC · JPL
362293	2009 SV_{238}	—	September 16, 2009	Catalina	CSS	LUT	6.2 km	MPC · JPL
362294	2009 SZ_{241}	—	December 25, 2005	Kitt Peak	Spacewatch	·	3.3 km	MPC · JPL
362295	2009 SJ_{247}	—	September 18, 2009	Kitt Peak	Spacewatch	·	4.5 km	MPC · JPL
362296	2009 SB_{263}	—	December 1, 2005	Kitt Peak	Spacewatch	·	3.2 km	MPC · JPL
362297	2009 SK_{263}	—	September 23, 2009	Mount Lemmon	Mount Lemmon Survey	·	4.4 km	MPC · JPL
362298	2009 SJ_{273}	—	September 25, 2009	Kitt Peak	Spacewatch	·	2.9 km	MPC · JPL
362299	2009 SV_{277}	—	September 25, 2009	Kitt Peak	Spacewatch	·	3.0 km	MPC · JPL
362300	2009 SU_{290}	—	September 25, 2009	Kitt Peak	Spacewatch	·	3.4 km	MPC · JPL

== 362301–362400 ==
back to top

Designation			Discovery			Properties		Ref
Permanent	Provisional	Named after	Date	Site	Discoverer(s)	Category	Diam.	Ref
362301	2009 SU_{304}	—	August 16, 2009	Kitt Peak	Spacewatch	·	3.6 km	MPC · JPL
362302	2009 SY_{304}	—	September 17, 2009	Kitt Peak	Spacewatch	·	1.9 km	MPC · JPL
362303	2009 SQ_{312}	—	September 18, 2009	Mount Lemmon	Mount Lemmon Survey	·	2.4 km	MPC · JPL
362304	2009 SB_{328}	—	September 26, 2009	Kitt Peak	Spacewatch	·	2.6 km	MPC · JPL
362305	2009 SE_{349}	—	September 22, 2009	Mount Lemmon	Mount Lemmon Survey	·	2.2 km	MPC · JPL
362306	2009 TD_{4}	—	October 13, 2009	Mayhill	Lowe, A.	·	5.0 km	MPC · JPL
362307	2009 TU_{21}	—	October 12, 2009	Mount Lemmon	Mount Lemmon Survey	THM	3.0 km	MPC · JPL
362308	2009 TQ_{31}	—	October 15, 2009	La Sagra	OAM	T_{j} (2.99) · EUP	5.4 km	MPC · JPL
362309	2009 TF_{32}	—	October 13, 2009	Socorro	LINEAR	·	3.8 km	MPC · JPL
362310	2009 UM_{3}	—	October 19, 2009	Socorro	LINEAR	T_{j} (2.96) · APO +1km · critical	890 m	MPC · JPL
362311	2009 UN_{71}	—	October 22, 2009	Catalina	CSS	H	640 m	MPC · JPL
362312	2009 UE_{86}	—	October 24, 2009	Mount Lemmon	Mount Lemmon Survey	·	3.2 km	MPC · JPL
362313	2009 UL_{107}	—	October 22, 2009	Mount Lemmon	Mount Lemmon Survey	·	3.0 km	MPC · JPL
362314	2009 UH_{134}	—	October 2, 2008	Kitt Peak	Spacewatch	L4	6.4 km	MPC · JPL
362315	2009 UN_{140}	—	October 24, 2009	Kitt Peak	Spacewatch	3:2	7.6 km	MPC · JPL
362316 Dogora	2009 VT_{44}	Dogora	November 15, 2009	Nogales	J.-C. Merlin	·	3.1 km	MPC · JPL
362317	2009 VA_{96}	—	November 8, 2009	Kitt Peak	Spacewatch	·	3.2 km	MPC · JPL
362318	2009 WG_{143}	—	September 17, 2009	Mount Lemmon	Mount Lemmon Survey	·	4.4 km	MPC · JPL
362319	2010 AL_{61}	—	January 10, 2010	Socorro	LINEAR	H	590 m	MPC · JPL
362320	2010 AT_{77}	—	January 6, 2010	Catalina	CSS	H	760 m	MPC · JPL
362321	2010 BC_{125}	—	May 14, 2004	Kitt Peak	Spacewatch	L4	10 km	MPC · JPL
362322	2010 CS_{140}	—	March 9, 2005	Catalina	CSS	H	610 m	MPC · JPL
362323	2010 FM_{87}	—	March 19, 2010	Kitt Peak	Spacewatch	·	1.1 km	MPC · JPL
362324	2010 GO_{108}	—	April 8, 2010	Kitt Peak	Spacewatch	·	820 m	MPC · JPL
362325	2010 HA_{29}	—	April 19, 2010	WISE	WISE	·	1.3 km	MPC · JPL
362326	2010 HW_{30}	—	April 19, 2010	WISE	WISE	·	2.2 km	MPC · JPL
362327	2010 HR_{78}	—	April 20, 2010	Kitt Peak	Spacewatch	·	700 m	MPC · JPL
362328	2010 JB_{74}	—	April 8, 2010	Kitt Peak	Spacewatch	·	1.1 km	MPC · JPL
362329	2010 JD_{77}	—	November 21, 2008	Kitt Peak	Spacewatch	·	550 m	MPC · JPL
362330	2010 JJ_{84}	—	May 4, 2010	Kitt Peak	Spacewatch	·	800 m	MPC · JPL
362331	2010 JQ_{151}	—	May 4, 2010	Catalina	CSS	·	1.2 km	MPC · JPL
362332	2010 KW_{34}	—	May 19, 2010	WISE	WISE	PHO	2.7 km	MPC · JPL
362333	2010 KG_{38}	—	May 17, 2010	Kitt Peak	Spacewatch	·	680 m	MPC · JPL
362334	2010 KY_{49}	—	May 22, 2010	WISE	WISE	·	2.1 km	MPC · JPL
362335	2010 KZ_{120}	—	May 31, 2010	WISE	WISE	·	1.9 km	MPC · JPL
362336	2010 LN_{18}	—	June 3, 2010	WISE	WISE	·	3.0 km	MPC · JPL
362337	2010 LO_{37}	—	June 6, 2010	WISE	WISE	HOF	2.5 km	MPC · JPL
362338	2010 LW_{40}	—	October 10, 2005	Catalina	CSS	·	4.0 km	MPC · JPL
362339	2010 LS_{50}	—	June 8, 2010	WISE	WISE	EUN	3.1 km	MPC · JPL
362340	2010 LV_{63}	—	June 10, 2010	Mount Lemmon	Mount Lemmon Survey	·	780 m	MPC · JPL
362341	2010 LK_{85}	—	October 3, 2006	Mount Lemmon	Mount Lemmon Survey	·	2.4 km	MPC · JPL
362342	2010 LM_{85}	—	June 11, 2010	WISE	WISE	HOF	2.6 km	MPC · JPL
362343	2010 LC_{135}	—	June 15, 2010	Mount Lemmon	Mount Lemmon Survey	·	2.7 km	MPC · JPL
362344	2010 MB_{10}	—	May 2, 2006	Mount Lemmon	Mount Lemmon Survey	·	2.0 km	MPC · JPL
362345	2010 MD_{34}	—	June 21, 2010	WISE	WISE	·	2.4 km	MPC · JPL
362346	2010 MW_{37}	—	October 28, 2006	Mount Lemmon	Mount Lemmon Survey	·	2.0 km	MPC · JPL
362347	2010 ME_{46}	—	June 23, 2010	WISE	WISE	·	2.4 km	MPC · JPL
362348	2010 MO_{63}	—	March 17, 2002	Kitt Peak	Spacewatch	·	4.2 km	MPC · JPL
362349	2010 MZ_{65}	—	June 25, 2010	WISE	WISE	·	2.1 km	MPC · JPL
362350	2010 MD_{68}	—	February 11, 2002	Socorro	LINEAR	·	4.4 km	MPC · JPL
362351	2010 MR_{72}	—	March 28, 2008	Mount Lemmon	Mount Lemmon Survey	·	2.7 km	MPC · JPL
362352	2010 MW_{87}	—	April 30, 2006	Kitt Peak	Spacewatch	·	880 m	MPC · JPL
362353	2010 ML_{89}	—	June 27, 2010	WISE	WISE	·	2.3 km	MPC · JPL
362354	2010 MB_{90}	—	June 27, 2010	WISE	WISE	HOF	2.7 km	MPC · JPL
362355	2010 ME_{94}	—	June 28, 2010	WISE	WISE	ADE	3.1 km	MPC · JPL
362356	2010 MN_{97}	—	June 28, 2010	WISE	WISE	·	1.4 km	MPC · JPL
362357	2010 MK_{109}	—	June 4, 2006	Kitt Peak	Spacewatch	ERI	1.7 km	MPC · JPL
362358	2010 NO_{4}	—	July 4, 2010	Mount Lemmon	Mount Lemmon Survey	·	1.2 km	MPC · JPL
362359	2010 NQ_{5}	—	July 4, 2010	Kitt Peak	Spacewatch	V	730 m	MPC · JPL
362360	2010 NW_{5}	—	July 5, 2010	Mount Lemmon	Mount Lemmon Survey	MAS	930 m	MPC · JPL
362361	2010 NY_{5}	—	July 5, 2010	Kitt Peak	Spacewatch	NYS	1.2 km	MPC · JPL
362362	2010 NW_{11}	—	February 10, 2007	Mount Lemmon	Mount Lemmon Survey	·	4.2 km	MPC · JPL
362363	2010 NX_{13}	—	March 12, 2008	Kitt Peak	Spacewatch	PAD	2.7 km	MPC · JPL
362364	2010 NP_{19}	—	July 6, 2010	WISE	WISE	·	5.4 km	MPC · JPL
362365	2010 NL_{24}	—	April 11, 2008	Mount Lemmon	Mount Lemmon Survey	TRE	3.2 km	MPC · JPL
362366	2010 NP_{24}	—	November 1, 2005	Mount Lemmon	Mount Lemmon Survey	·	3.6 km	MPC · JPL
362367	2010 NH_{28}	—	July 7, 2010	WISE	WISE	·	3.8 km	MPC · JPL
362368	2010 ND_{39}	—	August 12, 2001	Palomar	NEAT	·	3.5 km	MPC · JPL
362369	2010 NC_{45}	—	July 9, 2010	WISE	WISE	·	3.8 km	MPC · JPL
362370	2010 ND_{48}	—	July 9, 2010	WISE	WISE	·	1.6 km	MPC · JPL
362371	2010 NE_{48}	—	July 9, 2010	WISE	WISE	·	4.3 km	MPC · JPL
362372	2010 NG_{50}	—	April 3, 2008	Kitt Peak	Spacewatch	·	4.6 km	MPC · JPL
362373	2010 NW_{55}	—	October 21, 2006	Lulin	LUSS	·	3.5 km	MPC · JPL
362374	2010 NS_{57}	—	July 10, 2010	WISE	WISE	·	3.6 km	MPC · JPL
362375	2010 NK_{61}	—	July 11, 2010	WISE	WISE	·	2.4 km	MPC · JPL
362376	2010 ND_{66}	—	July 6, 2010	Kitt Peak	Spacewatch	·	840 m	MPC · JPL
362377	2010 NT_{71}	—	October 7, 1999	Catalina	CSS	·	4.0 km	MPC · JPL
362378	2010 NQ_{73}	—	July 15, 2010	WISE	WISE	·	2.6 km	MPC · JPL
362379	2010 NJ_{76}	—	July 15, 2010	WISE	WISE	·	2.2 km	MPC · JPL
362380	2010 NV_{79}	—	May 6, 2008	Mount Lemmon	Mount Lemmon Survey	·	3.7 km	MPC · JPL
362381	2010 NA_{103}	—	December 13, 2006	Mount Lemmon	Mount Lemmon Survey	·	3.2 km	MPC · JPL
362382	2010 NY_{105}	—	July 12, 2010	WISE	WISE	·	1.8 km	MPC · JPL
362383	2010 NV_{106}	—	July 12, 2010	WISE	WISE	·	3.2 km	MPC · JPL
362384	2010 NM_{113}	—	July 13, 2010	WISE	WISE	·	2.4 km	MPC · JPL
362385	2010 NW_{113}	—	December 14, 2001	Socorro	LINEAR	·	4.3 km	MPC · JPL
362386	2010 NY_{113}	—	July 13, 2010	WISE	WISE	·	3.3 km	MPC · JPL
362387	2010 OL_{9}	—	October 27, 2005	Mount Lemmon	Mount Lemmon Survey	·	3.6 km	MPC · JPL
362388	2010 OH_{24}	—	March 18, 2009	Kitt Peak	Spacewatch	(5)	1.7 km	MPC · JPL
362389	2010 OW_{34}	—	April 14, 2002	Socorro	LINEAR	·	1.5 km	MPC · JPL
362390	2010 OW_{38}	—	July 21, 2010	WISE	WISE	·	4.0 km	MPC · JPL
362391	2010 OB_{43}	—	October 20, 2006	Mount Lemmon	Mount Lemmon Survey	·	3.1 km	MPC · JPL
362392	2010 OV_{43}	—	July 21, 2010	WISE	WISE	·	4.2 km	MPC · JPL
362393	2010 ON_{51}	—	July 22, 2010	WISE	WISE	·	2.3 km	MPC · JPL
362394	2010 OE_{58}	—	July 23, 2010	WISE	WISE	CYB	5.3 km	MPC · JPL
362395	2010 OP_{64}	—	April 11, 2007	Kitt Peak	Spacewatch	·	5.5 km	MPC · JPL
362396	2010 OS_{66}	—	March 15, 2008	Kitt Peak	Spacewatch	·	3.0 km	MPC · JPL
362397	2010 OF_{75}	—	July 25, 2010	WISE	WISE	·	5.4 km	MPC · JPL
362398	2010 OK_{94}	—	July 28, 2010	WISE	WISE	·	4.9 km	MPC · JPL
362399	2010 OT_{95}	—	October 22, 2001	Palomar	NEAT	·	2.3 km	MPC · JPL
362400	2010 OF_{97}	—	March 30, 2000	Kitt Peak	Spacewatch	·	1.9 km	MPC · JPL

== 362401–362500 ==
back to top

Designation			Discovery			Properties		Ref
Permanent	Provisional	Named after	Date	Site	Discoverer(s)	Category	Diam.	Ref
362401	2010 OL_{110}	—	August 12, 2001	Palomar	NEAT	·	1.9 km	MPC · JPL
362402	2010 OG_{114}	—	July 30, 2010	WISE	WISE	LUT	6.1 km	MPC · JPL
362403	2010 OK_{124}	—	December 10, 2005	Catalina	CSS	T_{j} (2.98) · EUP	4.7 km	MPC · JPL
362404	2010 PL	—	February 16, 2009	Dauban	Kugel, F.	MAS	920 m	MPC · JPL
362405	2010 PD_{4}	—	July 29, 2005	Palomar	NEAT	·	4.0 km	MPC · JPL
362406	2010 PG_{4}	—	May 18, 2002	Palomar	NEAT	·	4.8 km	MPC · JPL
362407	2010 PJ_{4}	—	December 26, 2005	Mount Lemmon	Mount Lemmon Survey	·	5.6 km	MPC · JPL
362408	2010 PY_{9}	—	August 4, 2010	Socorro	LINEAR	·	950 m	MPC · JPL
362409	2010 PD_{10}	—	August 5, 2010	Socorro	LINEAR	·	1.1 km	MPC · JPL
362410	2010 PJ_{10}	—	August 5, 2010	Socorro	LINEAR	·	1.7 km	MPC · JPL
362411	2010 PO_{26}	—	September 28, 2006	Mount Lemmon	Mount Lemmon Survey	·	2.0 km	MPC · JPL
362412	2010 PR_{38}	—	April 4, 2008	Kitt Peak	Spacewatch	·	3.6 km	MPC · JPL
362413	2010 PF_{55}	—	April 22, 2004	Kitt Peak	Spacewatch	(13314)	2.7 km	MPC · JPL
362414	2010 PU_{55}	—	March 12, 2008	Kitt Peak	Spacewatch	·	3.2 km	MPC · JPL
362415	2010 PH_{57}	—	August 4, 2010	La Sagra	OAM	·	1.4 km	MPC · JPL
362416	2010 PK_{57}	—	September 30, 2003	Kitt Peak	Spacewatch	MAS	960 m	MPC · JPL
362417	2010 PK_{58}	—	September 30, 1973	Palomar	C. J. van Houten, I. van Houten-Groeneveld, T. Gehrels	·	3.9 km	MPC · JPL
362418	2010 PN_{61}	—	August 10, 2010	Kitt Peak	Spacewatch	·	1.2 km	MPC · JPL
362419	2010 PH_{69}	—	August 9, 2010	WISE	WISE	·	3.8 km	MPC · JPL
362420 Rolandgarros	2010 PY_{71}	Rolandgarros	August 14, 2004	Saint-Sulpice	B. Christophe	·	3.8 km	MPC · JPL
362421	2010 PM_{75}	—	August 12, 2010	Purple Mountain	PMO NEO Survey Program	·	1.9 km	MPC · JPL
362422	2010 PZ_{78}	—	November 19, 2003	Anderson Mesa	LONEOS	·	1.5 km	MPC · JPL
362423	2010 PB_{79}	—	August 7, 2010	La Sagra	OAM	·	1.4 km	MPC · JPL
362424	2010 QB_{1}	—	November 12, 1999	Kitt Peak	Spacewatch	NYS	1.4 km	MPC · JPL
362425	2010 QO_{3}	—	August 30, 2010	La Sagra	OAM	MAS	830 m	MPC · JPL
362426	2010 QC_{4}	—	October 19, 2003	Kitt Peak	Spacewatch	MAS	730 m	MPC · JPL
362427	2010 QX_{5}	—	August 16, 2010	La Sagra	OAM	MAS	820 m	MPC · JPL
362428	2010 RM_{1}	—	September 1, 2010	Mount Lemmon	Mount Lemmon Survey	·	1.7 km	MPC · JPL
362429	2010 RU_{4}	—	September 1, 2010	ESA OGS	ESA OGS	·	1.2 km	MPC · JPL
362430	2010 RU_{10}	—	January 18, 2008	Mount Lemmon	Mount Lemmon Survey	·	3.4 km	MPC · JPL
362431	2010 RQ_{46}	—	September 2, 2010	Socorro	LINEAR	·	2.1 km	MPC · JPL
362432	2010 RR_{47}	—	October 6, 2005	Kitt Peak	Spacewatch	EOS	1.9 km	MPC · JPL
362433	2010 RP_{48}	—	September 4, 2010	Kitt Peak	Spacewatch	NYS	1.4 km	MPC · JPL
362434	2010 RF_{51}	—	September 4, 2010	Kitt Peak	Spacewatch	EOS	2.6 km	MPC · JPL
362435	2010 RS_{51}	—	April 7, 1999	Kitt Peak	Spacewatch	WAT	1.8 km	MPC · JPL
362436	2010 RJ_{52}	—	September 4, 2010	La Sagra	OAM	·	2.5 km	MPC · JPL
362437	2010 RK_{52}	—	September 4, 2010	La Sagra	OAM	NYS	1.4 km	MPC · JPL
362438	2010 RV_{58}	—	May 25, 2006	Kitt Peak	Spacewatch	·	950 m	MPC · JPL
362439	2010 RW_{61}	—	September 6, 1999	Eskridge	G. Hug, G. Bell	·	1.1 km	MPC · JPL
362440	2010 RJ_{63}	—	October 21, 2006	Mount Lemmon	Mount Lemmon Survey	·	1.8 km	MPC · JPL
362441	2010 RD_{70}	—	October 19, 2006	Mount Lemmon	Mount Lemmon Survey	·	1.5 km	MPC · JPL
362442	2010 RE_{79}	—	September 2, 2010	Mount Lemmon	Mount Lemmon Survey	·	1.5 km	MPC · JPL
362443	2010 RD_{87}	—	May 7, 2002	Palomar	NEAT	NYS	1.2 km	MPC · JPL
362444	2010 RU_{97}	—	September 10, 2010	Kitt Peak	Spacewatch	·	2.0 km	MPC · JPL
362445	2010 RH_{98}	—	October 2, 2006	Kitt Peak	Spacewatch	·	1.2 km	MPC · JPL
362446	2010 RN_{101}	—	October 2, 1997	Mauna Kea	C. Veillet, R. Shanks	EUN	1.4 km	MPC · JPL
362447	2010 RR_{106}	—	February 7, 2008	Mount Lemmon	Mount Lemmon Survey	·	2.3 km	MPC · JPL
362448	2010 RS_{106}	—	August 28, 2005	Kitt Peak	Spacewatch	·	2.1 km	MPC · JPL
362449	2010 RQ_{107}	—	September 10, 2010	Kitt Peak	Spacewatch	·	2.4 km	MPC · JPL
362450	2010 RW_{107}	—	March 31, 2008	Kitt Peak	Spacewatch	·	1.8 km	MPC · JPL
362451	2010 RJ_{110}	—	September 27, 2006	Kitt Peak	Spacewatch	·	1.4 km	MPC · JPL
362452	2010 RZ_{110}	—	September 11, 2010	Kitt Peak	Spacewatch	MAS	870 m	MPC · JPL
362453	2010 RP_{115}	—	October 29, 1998	Kitt Peak	Spacewatch	(5)	1.0 km	MPC · JPL
362454	2010 RA_{116}	—	April 7, 2008	Kitt Peak	Spacewatch	EOS	1.9 km	MPC · JPL
362455	2010 RC_{125}	—	May 10, 2002	Socorro	LINEAR	MAS	930 m	MPC · JPL
362456	2010 RG_{126}	—	January 28, 2007	Mount Lemmon	Mount Lemmon Survey	·	3.2 km	MPC · JPL
362457	2010 RN_{127}	—	October 20, 2003	Kitt Peak	Spacewatch	MAS	850 m	MPC · JPL
362458	2010 RS_{134}	—	August 28, 2005	Kitt Peak	Spacewatch	·	1.8 km	MPC · JPL
362459	2010 RT_{139}	—	February 8, 2008	Kitt Peak	Spacewatch	·	2.0 km	MPC · JPL
362460	2010 RV_{143}	—	August 25, 2004	Kitt Peak	Spacewatch	·	3.6 km	MPC · JPL
362461	2010 RJ_{144}	—	March 11, 2007	Mount Lemmon	Mount Lemmon Survey	EUP	3.5 km	MPC · JPL
362462	2010 RO_{146}	—	March 28, 2008	Mount Lemmon	Mount Lemmon Survey	·	2.1 km	MPC · JPL
362463	2010 RP_{147}	—	September 12, 2001	Kitt Peak	Deep Ecliptic Survey	·	1.6 km	MPC · JPL
362464	2010 RP_{150}	—	September 25, 2006	Kitt Peak	Spacewatch	·	1.2 km	MPC · JPL
362465	2010 RB_{151}	—	October 4, 2006	Mount Lemmon	Mount Lemmon Survey	·	1.5 km	MPC · JPL
362466	2010 RG_{154}	—	February 27, 2007	Kitt Peak	Spacewatch	·	3.1 km	MPC · JPL
362467	2010 RO_{155}	—	February 9, 2008	Mount Lemmon	Mount Lemmon Survey	·	1.8 km	MPC · JPL
362468	2010 RM_{161}	—	September 3, 2010	Mount Lemmon	Mount Lemmon Survey	BRA	1.8 km	MPC · JPL
362469	2010 RA_{165}	—	September 30, 2006	Mount Lemmon	Mount Lemmon Survey	·	2.0 km	MPC · JPL
362470	2010 RN_{166}	—	September 11, 2010	Kitt Peak	Spacewatch	·	3.5 km	MPC · JPL
362471	2010 RQ_{177}	—	August 27, 2005	Palomar	NEAT	AGN	1.2 km	MPC · JPL
362472	2010 RG_{184}	—	November 24, 2002	Palomar	NEAT	MAR	1.2 km	MPC · JPL
362473	2010 SX_{9}	—	September 26, 2006	Mount Lemmon	Mount Lemmon Survey	(7744)	1.4 km	MPC · JPL
362474	2010 SN_{17}	—	January 28, 2003	Kitt Peak	Spacewatch	AGN	1.2 km	MPC · JPL
362475	2010 SA_{18}	—	February 17, 2005	La Silla	A. Boattini, H. Scholl	MAS	760 m	MPC · JPL
362476	2010 SF_{19}	—	September 27, 2010	Kitt Peak	Spacewatch	·	2.0 km	MPC · JPL
362477	2010 SL_{19}	—	September 9, 2010	Kitt Peak	Spacewatch	VER	3.3 km	MPC · JPL
362478	2010 SQ_{20}	—	March 31, 2008	Mount Lemmon	Mount Lemmon Survey	·	2.8 km	MPC · JPL
362479	2010 ST_{24}	—	February 29, 2004	Kitt Peak	Spacewatch	·	2.1 km	MPC · JPL
362480	2010 SD_{28}	—	February 12, 2008	Kitt Peak	Spacewatch	·	1.7 km	MPC · JPL
362481	2010 SN_{28}	—	March 3, 1997	Kitt Peak	Spacewatch	·	2.2 km	MPC · JPL
362482	2010 SX_{32}	—	February 1, 2008	Mount Lemmon	Mount Lemmon Survey	·	2.2 km	MPC · JPL
362483	2010 SE_{34}	—	February 2, 2009	Kitt Peak	Spacewatch	·	1.3 km	MPC · JPL
362484	2010 SF_{34}	—	August 28, 2006	Catalina	CSS	·	2.4 km	MPC · JPL
362485	2010 SX_{38}	—	September 28, 2006	Kitt Peak	Spacewatch	MAR	1.4 km	MPC · JPL
362486	2010 SZ_{41}	—	April 29, 2008	Kitt Peak	Spacewatch	·	3.3 km	MPC · JPL
362487	2010 TD_{1}	—	December 1, 2005	Kitt Peak	Spacewatch	·	2.6 km	MPC · JPL
362488	2010 TH_{10}	—	September 9, 2010	Kitt Peak	Spacewatch	AGN	1.4 km	MPC · JPL
362489	2010 TD_{13}	—	October 23, 2005	Catalina	CSS	EOS	2.0 km	MPC · JPL
362490	2010 TK_{16}	—	August 23, 2004	Kitt Peak	Spacewatch	·	3.0 km	MPC · JPL
362491	2010 TS_{16}	—	March 5, 2008	Mount Lemmon	Mount Lemmon Survey	WIT	950 m	MPC · JPL
362492	2010 TS_{17}	—	October 14, 2004	Anderson Mesa	LONEOS	·	4.5 km	MPC · JPL
362493	2010 TM_{25}	—	October 23, 2005	Catalina	CSS	EOS	2.5 km	MPC · JPL
362494	2010 TR_{25}	—	November 20, 2006	Kitt Peak	Spacewatch	AGN	1.2 km	MPC · JPL
362495	2010 TZ_{27}	—	February 9, 2008	Kitt Peak	Spacewatch	HOF	2.5 km	MPC · JPL
362496	2010 TH_{28}	—	March 6, 2008	Mount Lemmon	Mount Lemmon Survey	·	2.1 km	MPC · JPL
362497	2010 TE_{29}	—	May 5, 2008	Mount Lemmon	Mount Lemmon Survey	EOS	1.9 km	MPC · JPL
362498	2010 TP_{33}	—	September 20, 2000	Kitt Peak	Deep Ecliptic Survey	·	1.8 km	MPC · JPL
362499	2010 TK_{34}	—	October 12, 2006	Kitt Peak	Spacewatch	BRG	1.3 km	MPC · JPL
362500	2010 TT_{39}	—	February 23, 2007	Kitt Peak	Spacewatch	·	2.2 km	MPC · JPL

== 362501–362600 ==
back to top

Designation			Discovery			Properties		Ref
Permanent	Provisional	Named after	Date	Site	Discoverer(s)	Category	Diam.	Ref
362501	2010 TP_{50}	—	April 13, 2008	Mount Lemmon	Mount Lemmon Survey	·	2.8 km	MPC · JPL
362502	2010 TX_{59}	—	September 18, 2006	Catalina	CSS	·	1.7 km	MPC · JPL
362503	2010 TL_{66}	—	October 20, 2006	Kitt Peak	Spacewatch	·	1.9 km	MPC · JPL
362504	2010 TA_{74}	—	October 22, 2005	Kitt Peak	Spacewatch	EOS	1.8 km	MPC · JPL
362505	2010 TM_{75}	—	October 1, 2005	Mount Lemmon	Mount Lemmon Survey	·	1.7 km	MPC · JPL
362506	2010 TQ_{77}	—	September 30, 2005	Kitt Peak	Spacewatch	·	2.3 km	MPC · JPL
362507	2010 TA_{79}	—	October 6, 1999	Socorro	LINEAR	·	3.6 km	MPC · JPL
362508	2010 TW_{79}	—	September 30, 2006	Mount Lemmon	Mount Lemmon Survey	·	1.3 km	MPC · JPL
362509	2010 TV_{81}	—	September 18, 2010	Mount Lemmon	Mount Lemmon Survey	EOS	1.9 km	MPC · JPL
362510	2010 TN_{84}	—	November 6, 2005	Mount Lemmon	Mount Lemmon Survey	HYG	2.8 km	MPC · JPL
362511	2010 TP_{84}	—	August 8, 2002	Palomar	NEAT	·	1.3 km	MPC · JPL
362512	2010 TU_{84}	—	October 14, 2001	Kitt Peak	Spacewatch	·	1.7 km	MPC · JPL
362513	2010 TY_{84}	—	October 21, 2001	Kitt Peak	Spacewatch	·	1.9 km	MPC · JPL
362514	2010 TH_{85}	—	February 2, 2008	Kitt Peak	Spacewatch	·	2.4 km	MPC · JPL
362515	2010 TQ_{86}	—	March 28, 2008	Kitt Peak	Spacewatch	EOS	2.3 km	MPC · JPL
362516	2010 TB_{88}	—	September 14, 2005	Kitt Peak	Spacewatch	·	1.8 km	MPC · JPL
362517	2010 TR_{90}	—	December 15, 2006	Kitt Peak	Spacewatch	·	1.7 km	MPC · JPL
362518	2010 TT_{94}	—	September 12, 2010	Kitt Peak	Spacewatch	·	2.9 km	MPC · JPL
362519	2010 TO_{104}	—	January 19, 1999	Kitt Peak	Spacewatch	·	2.3 km	MPC · JPL
362520	2010 TP_{104}	—	September 17, 2004	Socorro	LINEAR	·	4.7 km	MPC · JPL
362521	2010 TQ_{112}	—	January 27, 2007	Kitt Peak	Spacewatch	·	2.7 km	MPC · JPL
362522	2010 TT_{112}	—	October 12, 2005	Kitt Peak	Spacewatch	·	1.6 km	MPC · JPL
362523	2010 TN_{116}	—	July 29, 2005	Palomar	NEAT	·	2.8 km	MPC · JPL
362524	2010 TL_{140}	—	September 11, 2004	Socorro	LINEAR	·	3.8 km	MPC · JPL
362525	2010 TT_{151}	—	November 5, 2005	Kitt Peak	Spacewatch	THM	2.4 km	MPC · JPL
362526	2010 TO_{153}	—	October 30, 2005	Mount Lemmon	Mount Lemmon Survey	·	2.2 km	MPC · JPL
362527	2010 TY_{158}	—	October 1, 2005	Kitt Peak	Spacewatch	KOR	1.5 km	MPC · JPL
362528	2010 TA_{188}	—	August 31, 2005	Kitt Peak	Spacewatch	·	1.9 km	MPC · JPL
362529	2010 UW_{5}	—	July 25, 2010	WISE	WISE	·	3.0 km	MPC · JPL
362530	2010 UY_{9}	—	October 17, 2010	Mount Lemmon	Mount Lemmon Survey	·	3.7 km	MPC · JPL
362531	2010 UP_{10}	—	October 8, 2004	Kitt Peak	Spacewatch	URS	4.4 km	MPC · JPL
362532	2010 UT_{13}	—	November 5, 1999	Kitt Peak	Spacewatch	·	5.0 km	MPC · JPL
362533	2010 UY_{17}	—	December 7, 2005	Kitt Peak	Spacewatch	·	3.0 km	MPC · JPL
362534	2010 UW_{18}	—	May 20, 2004	Kitt Peak	Spacewatch	·	3.0 km	MPC · JPL
362535	2010 UC_{20}	—	September 27, 2006	Mount Lemmon	Mount Lemmon Survey	·	1.6 km	MPC · JPL
362536	2010 UW_{23}	—	March 26, 2007	Mount Lemmon	Mount Lemmon Survey	SYL · CYB	4.3 km	MPC · JPL
362537	2010 UR_{32}	—	March 10, 2002	Kitt Peak	Spacewatch	EOS	1.8 km	MPC · JPL
362538	2010 UY_{34}	—	April 4, 2002	Kitt Peak	Spacewatch	EOS	2.3 km	MPC · JPL
362539	2010 UV_{40}	—	October 22, 2005	Kitt Peak	Spacewatch	·	2.0 km	MPC · JPL
362540	2010 UR_{43}	—	April 17, 2009	Kitt Peak	Spacewatch	·	1.2 km	MPC · JPL
362541	2010 UU_{43}	—	October 30, 2005	Mount Lemmon	Mount Lemmon Survey	·	2.1 km	MPC · JPL
362542	2010 UG_{44}	—	February 27, 2007	Kitt Peak	Spacewatch	·	3.0 km	MPC · JPL
362543	2010 UM_{44}	—	March 11, 2007	Mount Lemmon	Mount Lemmon Survey	·	3.4 km	MPC · JPL
362544	2010 UV_{52}	—	August 10, 2010	Kitt Peak	Spacewatch	EOS	2.3 km	MPC · JPL
362545	2010 UK_{54}	—	April 5, 2008	Kitt Peak	Spacewatch	·	3.1 km	MPC · JPL
362546	2010 UW_{59}	—	December 8, 2005	Kitt Peak	Spacewatch	EOS	2.5 km	MPC · JPL
362547	2010 UZ_{59}	—	April 30, 2005	Kitt Peak	Spacewatch	·	1.4 km	MPC · JPL
362548	2010 UK_{60}	—	August 16, 2009	Catalina	CSS	·	3.8 km	MPC · JPL
362549	2010 UD_{64}	—	October 27, 2005	Mount Lemmon	Mount Lemmon Survey	·	1.9 km	MPC · JPL
362550	2010 UJ_{66}	—	October 1, 2005	Catalina	CSS	·	2.3 km	MPC · JPL
362551	2010 UX_{71}	—	February 23, 2007	Kitt Peak	Spacewatch	EOS	2.1 km	MPC · JPL
362552	2010 UU_{93}	—	September 10, 2004	Kitt Peak	Spacewatch	·	3.4 km	MPC · JPL
362553	2010 UH_{100}	—	October 9, 2010	Catalina	CSS	·	3.3 km	MPC · JPL
362554	2010 VZ_{1}	—	November 30, 2005	Junk Bond	D. Healy	·	2.6 km	MPC · JPL
362555	2010 VU_{14}	—	August 11, 2001	Palomar	NEAT	·	2.4 km	MPC · JPL
362556	2010 VT_{24}	—	October 11, 2010	Catalina	CSS	·	3.4 km	MPC · JPL
362557	2010 VU_{31}	—	March 25, 2007	Mount Lemmon	Mount Lemmon Survey	CYB	4.8 km	MPC · JPL
362558	2010 VP_{38}	—	October 29, 2005	Kitt Peak	Spacewatch	·	2.4 km	MPC · JPL
362559	2010 VK_{41}	—	October 13, 2010	Charleston	R. Holmes, T. Vorobjov	·	2.7 km	MPC · JPL
362560	2010 VQ_{46}	—	October 20, 2004	Catalina	CSS	·	3.0 km	MPC · JPL
362561	2010 VJ_{53}	—	October 26, 2005	Kitt Peak	Spacewatch	KOR	1.4 km	MPC · JPL
362562	2010 VQ_{60}	—	December 6, 2005	Kitt Peak	Spacewatch	·	3.9 km	MPC · JPL
362563	2010 VG_{69}	—	November 7, 2002	Apache Point	SDSS	·	2.1 km	MPC · JPL
362564	2010 VZ_{69}	—	April 1, 2008	Kitt Peak	Spacewatch	EOS	2.0 km	MPC · JPL
362565	2010 VX_{70}	—	August 6, 2010	WISE	WISE	·	5.9 km	MPC · JPL
362566	2010 VK_{72}	—	May 5, 2008	Mount Lemmon	Mount Lemmon Survey	VER	3.3 km	MPC · JPL
362567	2010 VS_{77}	—	September 30, 2005	Mount Lemmon	Mount Lemmon Survey	EOS	2.0 km	MPC · JPL
362568	2010 VP_{78}	—	February 23, 2007	Kitt Peak	Spacewatch	·	3.8 km	MPC · JPL
362569	2010 VK_{85}	—	November 1, 2010	Kitt Peak	Spacewatch	·	4.3 km	MPC · JPL
362570	2010 VW_{86}	—	September 30, 2006	Mount Lemmon	Mount Lemmon Survey	·	1.3 km	MPC · JPL
362571	2010 VL_{88}	—	November 6, 2010	Kitt Peak	Spacewatch	·	3.5 km	MPC · JPL
362572	2010 VZ_{90}	—	November 6, 2010	Kitt Peak	Spacewatch	·	4.5 km	MPC · JPL
362573	2010 VL_{102}	—	June 4, 2003	Kitt Peak	Spacewatch	·	4.5 km	MPC · JPL
362574	2010 VH_{103}	—	March 12, 2007	Catalina	CSS	EOS	2.6 km	MPC · JPL
362575	2010 VP_{105}	—	May 12, 2005	Mount Lemmon	Mount Lemmon Survey	·	1.1 km	MPC · JPL
362576	2010 VT_{115}	—	September 15, 2004	Anderson Mesa	LONEOS	EOS	2.2 km	MPC · JPL
362577	2010 VH_{116}	—	November 25, 2005	Mount Lemmon	Mount Lemmon Survey	·	2.9 km	MPC · JPL
362578	2010 VX_{116}	—	April 2, 2002	Kitt Peak	Spacewatch	·	3.6 km	MPC · JPL
362579	2010 VO_{120}	—	October 11, 2005	Kitt Peak	Spacewatch	·	3.7 km	MPC · JPL
362580	2010 VS_{120}	—	November 26, 2005	Catalina	CSS	BRA	2.0 km	MPC · JPL
362581	2010 VW_{131}	—	July 21, 2001	Haleakala	NEAT	·	1.6 km	MPC · JPL
362582	2010 VJ_{138}	—	August 10, 2004	Anderson Mesa	LONEOS	EOS	2.5 km	MPC · JPL
362583	2010 VE_{163}	—	September 30, 2010	Mount Lemmon	Mount Lemmon Survey	THM	2.5 km	MPC · JPL
362584	2010 VK_{168}	—	May 29, 2008	Kitt Peak	Spacewatch	·	3.6 km	MPC · JPL
362585	2010 VO_{173}	—	May 12, 1996	Kitt Peak	Spacewatch	·	4.0 km	MPC · JPL
362586	2010 VZ_{173}	—	March 29, 2008	Kitt Peak	Spacewatch	EOS	2.4 km	MPC · JPL
362587	2010 VO_{174}	—	February 16, 2007	Catalina	CSS	EOS	2.4 km	MPC · JPL
362588	2010 VN_{175}	—	June 17, 1996	Lime Creek	R. Linderholm	·	2.3 km	MPC · JPL
362589	2010 VX_{181}	—	November 30, 2005	Mount Lemmon	Mount Lemmon Survey	·	3.5 km	MPC · JPL
362590	2010 VN_{182}	—	October 7, 2005	Catalina	CSS	BRA	1.7 km	MPC · JPL
362591	2010 VT_{194}	—	February 23, 2007	Mount Lemmon	Mount Lemmon Survey	VER	3.1 km	MPC · JPL
362592	2010 VA_{205}	—	October 7, 1999	Kitt Peak	Spacewatch	·	3.2 km	MPC · JPL
362593	2010 VJ_{205}	—	December 21, 2006	Kitt Peak	Spacewatch	·	1.7 km	MPC · JPL
362594	2010 VS_{207}	—	October 22, 2005	Kitt Peak	Spacewatch	·	2.0 km	MPC · JPL
362595	2010 VA_{211}	—	July 7, 2003	Kitt Peak	Spacewatch	·	4.1 km	MPC · JPL
362596	2010 VC_{217}	—	September 1, 2005	Palomar	NEAT	·	2.5 km	MPC · JPL
362597	2010 WG_{7}	—	August 24, 2001	Palomar	NEAT	·	2.1 km	MPC · JPL
362598	2010 WM_{21}	—	November 1, 1999	Kitt Peak	Spacewatch	·	3.4 km	MPC · JPL
362599	2010 WE_{35}	—	March 25, 2007	Mount Lemmon	Mount Lemmon Survey	·	3.7 km	MPC · JPL
362600	2010 WG_{47}	—	November 27, 2010	Mount Lemmon	Mount Lemmon Survey	VER	3.9 km	MPC · JPL

== 362601–362700 ==
back to top

Designation			Discovery			Properties		Ref
Permanent	Provisional	Named after	Date	Site	Discoverer(s)	Category	Diam.	Ref
362601	2010 WS_{53}	—	August 10, 2010	Kitt Peak	Spacewatch	EUN	1.5 km	MPC · JPL
362602	2010 WX_{55}	—	October 7, 2004	Socorro	LINEAR	·	3.9 km	MPC · JPL
362603	2010 WB_{62}	—	December 27, 2005	Kitt Peak	Spacewatch	·	3.6 km	MPC · JPL
362604	2010 WE_{68}	—	September 16, 2009	Mount Lemmon	Mount Lemmon Survey	VER	3.5 km	MPC · JPL
362605	2010 XZ_{33}	—	December 17, 2001	Socorro	LINEAR	·	2.7 km	MPC · JPL
362606	2010 XP_{65}	—	September 27, 2005	Kitt Peak	Spacewatch	·	2.4 km	MPC · JPL
362607	2010 XG_{73}	—	October 4, 1994	Kitt Peak	Spacewatch	·	2.2 km	MPC · JPL
362608	2010 XU_{79}	—	January 16, 2004	Kitt Peak	Spacewatch	3:2	6.8 km	MPC · JPL
362609	2011 BL_{2}	—	July 8, 2003	Palomar	NEAT	·	4.3 km	MPC · JPL
362610	2011 LW	—	September 25, 2006	Catalina	CSS	H	900 m	MPC · JPL
362611	2011 QL_{17}	—	February 3, 2009	Mount Lemmon	Mount Lemmon Survey	·	1.2 km	MPC · JPL
362612	2011 QQ_{51}	—	October 30, 2000	Socorro	LINEAR	H	700 m	MPC · JPL
362613	2011 QA_{98}	—	September 30, 2005	Mount Lemmon	Mount Lemmon Survey	·	880 m	MPC · JPL
362614	2011 RW_{12}	—	January 8, 2002	Socorro	LINEAR	·	790 m	MPC · JPL
362615	2011 RY_{17}	—	November 2, 2007	Kitt Peak	Spacewatch	·	1.7 km	MPC · JPL
362616	2011 RP_{19}	—	January 20, 2009	Mount Lemmon	Mount Lemmon Survey	EOS	2.9 km	MPC · JPL
362617	2011 SL_{16}	—	March 23, 2003	Kitt Peak	Spacewatch	·	960 m	MPC · JPL
362618	2011 SD_{32}	—	October 11, 1994	Kitt Peak	Spacewatch	·	940 m	MPC · JPL
362619	2011 SP_{35}	—	January 26, 2004	Anderson Mesa	LONEOS	·	1.2 km	MPC · JPL
362620	2011 SG_{38}	—	December 22, 2008	Mount Lemmon	Mount Lemmon Survey	·	1.2 km	MPC · JPL
362621	2011 SY_{51}	—	July 3, 2011	Mount Lemmon	Mount Lemmon Survey	·	1.1 km	MPC · JPL
362622	2011 SB_{67}	—	September 5, 2007	Catalina	CSS	·	2.1 km	MPC · JPL
362623	2011 SG_{68}	—	March 5, 2000	Socorro	LINEAR	H	580 m	MPC · JPL
362624	2011 SO_{97}	—	March 13, 2002	Socorro	LINEAR	·	1.1 km	MPC · JPL
362625	2011 ST_{104}	—	January 19, 2008	Mount Lemmon	Mount Lemmon Survey	·	1.8 km	MPC · JPL
362626	2011 SZ_{115}	—	September 10, 2004	Socorro	LINEAR	·	880 m	MPC · JPL
362627	2011 ST_{122}	—	October 31, 2000	Socorro	LINEAR	·	1.4 km	MPC · JPL
362628	2011 SO_{127}	—	September 16, 2001	Socorro	LINEAR	·	700 m	MPC · JPL
362629	2011 ST_{127}	—	January 1, 2008	Catalina	CSS	·	2.5 km	MPC · JPL
362630	2011 SY_{128}	—	March 19, 2009	Kitt Peak	Spacewatch	·	1.2 km	MPC · JPL
362631	2011 SL_{132}	—	July 5, 2011	Haleakala	Pan-STARRS 1	·	1.7 km	MPC · JPL
362632	2011 SC_{134}	—	December 10, 2004	Socorro	LINEAR	MAS	780 m	MPC · JPL
362633	2011 SW_{134}	—	September 21, 2000	Kitt Peak	Spacewatch	·	1.3 km	MPC · JPL
362634	2011 SB_{135}	—	March 12, 2002	Anderson Mesa	LONEOS	H	630 m	MPC · JPL
362635	2011 SL_{139}	—	February 27, 2009	Catalina	CSS	·	1.4 km	MPC · JPL
362636	2011 SH_{146}	—	December 16, 2004	Socorro	LINEAR	NYS	1.2 km	MPC · JPL
362637	2011 SP_{148}	—	November 7, 2008	Mount Lemmon	Mount Lemmon Survey	·	770 m	MPC · JPL
362638	2011 SR_{172}	—	October 3, 2008	Mount Lemmon	Mount Lemmon Survey	·	1.1 km	MPC · JPL
362639	2011 SJ_{181}	—	April 30, 2006	Kitt Peak	Spacewatch	·	1.4 km	MPC · JPL
362640	2011 SQ_{183}	—	September 12, 2002	Palomar	NEAT	·	1.6 km	MPC · JPL
362641	2011 SJ_{184}	—	December 18, 2001	Socorro	LINEAR	·	890 m	MPC · JPL
362642	2011 SN_{185}	—	November 4, 2004	Catalina	CSS	V	740 m	MPC · JPL
362643	2011 SZ_{185}	—	December 9, 2004	Kitt Peak	Spacewatch	NYS	1.4 km	MPC · JPL
362644	2011 SA_{202}	—	February 4, 2006	7300	W. K. Y. Yeung	·	750 m	MPC · JPL
362645	2011 SL_{214}	—	January 25, 2009	Catalina	CSS	·	1.2 km	MPC · JPL
362646	2011 SY_{218}	—	December 4, 2007	Kitt Peak	Spacewatch	·	2.2 km	MPC · JPL
362647	2011 SG_{219}	—	April 22, 2009	Mount Lemmon	Mount Lemmon Survey	JUN	1.4 km	MPC · JPL
362648	2011 SB_{222}	—	January 17, 2004	Palomar	NEAT	·	1.6 km	MPC · JPL
362649	2011 SV_{222}	—	August 30, 2005	Palomar	NEAT	·	3.9 km	MPC · JPL
362650	2011 SN_{230}	—	September 16, 2004	Kitt Peak	Spacewatch	·	1.1 km	MPC · JPL
362651	2011 SA_{232}	—	October 29, 2006	Mount Lemmon	Mount Lemmon Survey	H	630 m	MPC · JPL
362652	2011 SR_{245}	—	October 8, 2007	Mount Lemmon	Mount Lemmon Survey	·	1.4 km	MPC · JPL
362653	2011 SF_{272}	—	January 24, 2004	Socorro	LINEAR	·	1.3 km	MPC · JPL
362654	2011 SM_{275}	—	September 18, 2006	Catalina	CSS	·	3.0 km	MPC · JPL
362655	2011 SD_{276}	—	October 4, 2004	Kitt Peak	Spacewatch	NYS	1.0 km	MPC · JPL
362656	2011 TC_{2}	—	December 15, 2007	Catalina	CSS	·	1.7 km	MPC · JPL
362657	2011 TL_{9}	—	October 5, 2007	Kitt Peak	Spacewatch	·	1.0 km	MPC · JPL
362658	2011 UN	—	October 31, 2002	Socorro	LINEAR	·	1.9 km	MPC · JPL
362659	2011 UR_{5}	—	September 15, 2007	Mount Lemmon	Mount Lemmon Survey	·	1.6 km	MPC · JPL
362660	2011 UK_{6}	—	February 22, 2006	Kitt Peak	Spacewatch	·	840 m	MPC · JPL
362661	2011 UP_{7}	—	April 20, 2009	Mount Lemmon	Mount Lemmon Survey	·	1.4 km	MPC · JPL
362662	2011 UK_{8}	—	April 13, 2002	Palomar	NEAT	·	3.3 km	MPC · JPL
362663	2011 UO_{9}	—	December 6, 2007	Mount Lemmon	Mount Lemmon Survey	·	1.0 km	MPC · JPL
362664	2011 UY_{9}	—	December 19, 2004	Kitt Peak	Spacewatch	·	1.2 km	MPC · JPL
362665	2011 UW_{10}	—	April 24, 2006	Kitt Peak	Spacewatch	·	1.3 km	MPC · JPL
362666	2011 UR_{12}	—	October 15, 2001	Kitt Peak	Spacewatch	·	720 m	MPC · JPL
362667	2011 UG_{22}	—	October 25, 2003	Kitt Peak	Spacewatch	·	1.5 km	MPC · JPL
362668	2011 UT_{23}	—	October 4, 2004	Kitt Peak	Spacewatch	·	1 km	MPC · JPL
362669	2011 UL_{38}	—	September 11, 2007	Mount Lemmon	Mount Lemmon Survey	CLA	1.6 km	MPC · JPL
362670	2011 UM_{47}	—	January 30, 2009	Mount Lemmon	Mount Lemmon Survey	V	690 m	MPC · JPL
362671	2011 UT_{47}	—	October 9, 2004	Kitt Peak	Spacewatch	·	1.0 km	MPC · JPL
362672	2011 UG_{52}	—	May 21, 2006	Kitt Peak	Spacewatch	·	1 km	MPC · JPL
362673	2011 UQ_{52}	—	August 23, 2007	Kitt Peak	Spacewatch	NYS	1.2 km	MPC · JPL
362674	2011 UE_{53}	—	October 18, 2011	Kitt Peak	Spacewatch	·	1.7 km	MPC · JPL
362675	2011 UO_{61}	—	October 10, 2002	Apache Point	SDSS	·	1.5 km	MPC · JPL
362676	2011 UL_{65}	—	October 10, 2002	Palomar	NEAT	·	2.0 km	MPC · JPL
362677	2011 UT_{75}	—	October 21, 2007	Mount Lemmon	Mount Lemmon Survey	(5)	1.3 km	MPC · JPL
362678	2011 UH_{82}	—	March 17, 2004	Kitt Peak	Spacewatch	ADE	2.3 km	MPC · JPL
362679	2011 UT_{84}	—	November 19, 2000	Kitt Peak	Spacewatch	·	1.2 km	MPC · JPL
362680	2011 UW_{86}	—	September 26, 2005	Catalina	CSS	·	4.1 km	MPC · JPL
362681	2011 UW_{87}	—	September 26, 2006	Kitt Peak	Spacewatch	·	1.8 km	MPC · JPL
362682	2011 UW_{90}	—	November 3, 2004	Palomar	NEAT	PHO	1.6 km	MPC · JPL
362683	2011 UD_{93}	—	May 3, 2006	Mount Lemmon	Mount Lemmon Survey	V	650 m	MPC · JPL
362684	2011 UP_{99}	—	October 10, 2007	Kitt Peak	Spacewatch	V	800 m	MPC · JPL
362685	2011 US_{101}	—	September 4, 2007	Mount Lemmon	Mount Lemmon Survey	V	600 m	MPC · JPL
362686	2011 UO_{112}	—	April 22, 2002	Kitt Peak	Spacewatch	·	1.7 km	MPC · JPL
362687	2011 UN_{122}	—	September 9, 2007	Kitt Peak	Spacewatch	·	1.4 km	MPC · JPL
362688	2011 UP_{128}	—	April 18, 2009	Mount Lemmon	Mount Lemmon Survey	·	2.3 km	MPC · JPL
362689	2011 UY_{128}	—	April 16, 2005	Kitt Peak	Spacewatch	·	1.3 km	MPC · JPL
362690	2011 UC_{132}	—	April 15, 2010	Mount Lemmon	Mount Lemmon Survey	·	700 m	MPC · JPL
362691	2011 UZ_{135}	—	October 8, 2007	Kitt Peak	Spacewatch	KON	2.1 km	MPC · JPL
362692	2011 UX_{136}	—	October 9, 2004	Kitt Peak	Spacewatch	V	700 m	MPC · JPL
362693	2011 UF_{137}	—	July 24, 2000	Kitt Peak	Spacewatch	·	920 m	MPC · JPL
362694	2011 UW_{138}	—	September 22, 2003	Kitt Peak	Spacewatch	·	1.3 km	MPC · JPL
362695	2011 UW_{146}	—	December 30, 2007	Mount Lemmon	Mount Lemmon Survey	·	2.2 km	MPC · JPL
362696	2011 UO_{151}	—	February 1, 2009	Mount Lemmon	Mount Lemmon Survey	V	710 m	MPC · JPL
362697	2011 UJ_{152}	—	June 1, 1997	Prescott	P. G. Comba	·	820 m	MPC · JPL
362698	2011 UF_{156}	—	May 14, 2008	Mount Lemmon	Mount Lemmon Survey	·	3.4 km	MPC · JPL
362699	2011 UA_{157}	—	April 19, 1996	Kitt Peak	Spacewatch	·	1.0 km	MPC · JPL
362700	2011 UF_{158}	—	December 3, 2004	Nashville	Clingan, R.	(2076)	980 m	MPC · JPL

== 362701–362800 ==
back to top

Designation			Discovery			Properties		Ref
Permanent	Provisional	Named after	Date	Site	Discoverer(s)	Category	Diam.	Ref
362701	2011 UH_{161}	—	September 19, 2006	Siding Spring	SSS	·	3.0 km	MPC · JPL
362702	2011 UP_{163}	—	December 10, 2005	Kitt Peak	Spacewatch	·	1.2 km	MPC · JPL
362703	2011 UA_{166}	—	August 19, 2006	Kitt Peak	Spacewatch	·	1.3 km	MPC · JPL
362704	2011 UN_{176}	—	November 2, 2007	Kitt Peak	Spacewatch	(5)	1.4 km	MPC · JPL
362705	2011 UB_{180}	—	November 15, 1995	Kitt Peak	Spacewatch	·	3.0 km	MPC · JPL
362706	2011 UX_{183}	—	October 3, 2002	Palomar	NEAT	·	2.3 km	MPC · JPL
362707	2011 UJ_{186}	—	December 22, 2005	Kitt Peak	Spacewatch	·	740 m	MPC · JPL
362708	2011 UM_{191}	—	October 13, 2001	Anderson Mesa	LONEOS	PHO	1.1 km	MPC · JPL
362709	2011 UE_{194}	—	April 16, 2004	Kitt Peak	Spacewatch	·	2.5 km	MPC · JPL
362710	2011 UA_{195}	—	September 4, 2007	Catalina	CSS	·	1.4 km	MPC · JPL
362711	2011 UR_{199}	—	December 4, 2007	Kitt Peak	Spacewatch	·	1.7 km	MPC · JPL
362712	2011 UQ_{200}	—	December 6, 2007	Kitt Peak	Spacewatch	·	1.5 km	MPC · JPL
362713	2011 UZ_{201}	—	November 1, 2000	Kitt Peak	Spacewatch	·	1.8 km	MPC · JPL
362714	2011 US_{202}	—	December 19, 2007	Mount Lemmon	Mount Lemmon Survey	·	1.4 km	MPC · JPL
362715	2011 UZ_{205}	—	February 28, 2008	Kitt Peak	Spacewatch	·	3.0 km	MPC · JPL
362716	2011 UH_{237}	—	February 5, 1995	Kitt Peak	Spacewatch	·	1.4 km	MPC · JPL
362717	2011 UR_{239}	—	March 8, 2005	Mount Lemmon	Mount Lemmon Survey	·	1.3 km	MPC · JPL
362718	2011 UJ_{242}	—	April 30, 2009	Catalina	CSS	EUN	1.7 km	MPC · JPL
362719	2011 UQ_{243}	—	September 23, 2000	Socorro	LINEAR	·	1.2 km	MPC · JPL
362720	2011 UZ_{246}	—	November 5, 2007	Mount Lemmon	Mount Lemmon Survey	·	1.0 km	MPC · JPL
362721	2011 UT_{247}	—	May 4, 2005	Mount Lemmon	Mount Lemmon Survey	HNS	1.3 km	MPC · JPL
362722	2011 UN_{250}	—	September 26, 2006	Kitt Peak	Spacewatch	·	1.6 km	MPC · JPL
362723	2011 UR_{250}	—	September 26, 2003	Apache Point	SDSS	NYS	1.2 km	MPC · JPL
362724	2011 UU_{250}	—	December 8, 1998	Kitt Peak	Spacewatch	EUN	1.2 km	MPC · JPL
362725	2011 UW_{250}	—	August 29, 2005	Kitt Peak	Spacewatch	·	2.3 km	MPC · JPL
362726	2011 UD_{254}	—	November 13, 2002	Palomar	NEAT	·	1.9 km	MPC · JPL
362727	2011 UH_{266}	—	December 17, 2007	Mount Lemmon	Mount Lemmon Survey	·	1.7 km	MPC · JPL
362728	2011 UX_{266}	—	November 19, 2003	Kitt Peak	Spacewatch	H	580 m	MPC · JPL
362729	2011 UR_{276}	—	September 13, 2007	Mount Lemmon	Mount Lemmon Survey	V	670 m	MPC · JPL
362730	2011 UX_{276}	—	December 18, 2003	Kitt Peak	Spacewatch	·	1.6 km	MPC · JPL
362731	2011 UW_{282}	—	October 12, 2007	Mount Lemmon	Mount Lemmon Survey	·	1.2 km	MPC · JPL
362732	2011 UB_{284}	—	November 6, 2007	Mount Lemmon	Mount Lemmon Survey	WIT	1.2 km	MPC · JPL
362733	2011 UL_{294}	—	May 15, 2005	Mount Lemmon	Mount Lemmon Survey	·	1.5 km	MPC · JPL
362734	2011 US_{294}	—	October 24, 1993	Kitt Peak	Spacewatch	V	590 m	MPC · JPL
362735	2011 UF_{299}	—	November 24, 2008	Mount Lemmon	Mount Lemmon Survey	·	790 m	MPC · JPL
362736	2011 UY_{299}	—	April 3, 2000	Kitt Peak	Spacewatch	(7744)	1.3 km	MPC · JPL
362737	2011 UJ_{303}	—	October 21, 2007	Mount Lemmon	Mount Lemmon Survey	(5)	970 m	MPC · JPL
362738	2011 UM_{305}	—	January 31, 2009	Kitt Peak	Spacewatch	KON	2.7 km	MPC · JPL
362739	2011 UO_{307}	—	November 19, 2003	Socorro	LINEAR	·	1.4 km	MPC · JPL
362740	2011 UE_{310}	—	December 4, 2007	Kitt Peak	Spacewatch	·	1.4 km	MPC · JPL
362741	2011 UD_{314}	—	May 4, 2005	Kitt Peak	Spacewatch	EUN	1.1 km	MPC · JPL
362742	2011 UM_{315}	—	January 21, 2008	Mount Lemmon	Mount Lemmon Survey	GEF	1.2 km	MPC · JPL
362743	2011 UB_{317}	—	January 15, 2005	Kitt Peak	Spacewatch	MAS	670 m	MPC · JPL
362744	2011 UO_{325}	—	October 30, 2008	Mount Lemmon	Mount Lemmon Survey	·	880 m	MPC · JPL
362745	2011 UP_{325}	—	April 2, 2006	Kitt Peak	Spacewatch	V	760 m	MPC · JPL
362746	2011 UF_{334}	—	March 23, 2006	Kitt Peak	Spacewatch	·	770 m	MPC · JPL
362747	2011 UJ_{335}	—	August 26, 2000	Kitt Peak	Spacewatch	·	1.3 km	MPC · JPL
362748	2011 UX_{335}	—	October 12, 2007	Socorro	LINEAR	HNS	1.3 km	MPC · JPL
362749	2011 UP_{339}	—	January 15, 2009	Kitt Peak	Spacewatch	·	780 m	MPC · JPL
362750	2011 UQ_{361}	—	September 27, 2000	Kitt Peak	Spacewatch	V	750 m	MPC · JPL
362751	2011 UU_{383}	—	June 21, 2007	Mount Lemmon	Mount Lemmon Survey	·	830 m	MPC · JPL
362752	2011 UB_{396}	—	April 10, 2002	Socorro	LINEAR	·	4.3 km	MPC · JPL
362753	2011 UT_{404}	—	February 20, 2009	Catalina	CSS	V	790 m	MPC · JPL
362754	2011 UX_{404}	—	September 25, 2006	Mount Lemmon	Mount Lemmon Survey	·	2.4 km	MPC · JPL
362755	2011 VE	—	September 14, 2002	Palomar	NEAT	·	1.5 km	MPC · JPL
362756	2011 VS_{10}	—	September 11, 2007	Catalina	CSS	V	840 m	MPC · JPL
362757	2011 VQ_{22}	—	December 15, 2003	Socorro	LINEAR	·	1.5 km	MPC · JPL
362758	2011 WR_{6}	—	January 24, 1996	Kitt Peak	Spacewatch	·	780 m	MPC · JPL
362759	2011 WB_{13}	—	May 3, 1997	Kitt Peak	Spacewatch	·	4.4 km	MPC · JPL
362760	2011 WP_{15}	—	October 28, 2011	Mount Lemmon	Mount Lemmon Survey	·	4.5 km	MPC · JPL
362761	2011 WL_{27}	—	August 10, 2007	Kitt Peak	Spacewatch	·	1.2 km	MPC · JPL
362762	2011 WB_{30}	—	September 14, 2005	Kitt Peak	Spacewatch	·	2.9 km	MPC · JPL
362763	2011 WD_{37}	—	March 24, 2009	Mount Lemmon	Mount Lemmon Survey	·	1.7 km	MPC · JPL
362764	2011 WM_{38}	—	March 19, 2009	Kitt Peak	Spacewatch	·	1.9 km	MPC · JPL
362765	2011 WY_{41}	—	January 25, 2009	Catalina	CSS	·	2.3 km	MPC · JPL
362766	2011 WB_{44}	—	December 18, 2007	Mount Lemmon	Mount Lemmon Survey	(5)	1.3 km	MPC · JPL
362767	2011 WA_{57}	—	March 10, 2005	Mount Lemmon	Mount Lemmon Survey	MAS	740 m	MPC · JPL
362768	2011 WA_{62}	—	May 28, 2009	Mount Lemmon	Mount Lemmon Survey	·	1.7 km	MPC · JPL
362769	2011 WE_{77}	—	December 10, 2004	Socorro	LINEAR	·	1.4 km	MPC · JPL
362770	2011 WD_{83}	—	March 25, 2006	Kitt Peak	Spacewatch	·	830 m	MPC · JPL
362771	2011 WU_{83}	—	April 11, 2005	Mount Lemmon	Mount Lemmon Survey	·	1.4 km	MPC · JPL
362772	2011 WD_{90}	—	October 3, 2006	Mount Lemmon	Mount Lemmon Survey	MRX	1.1 km	MPC · JPL
362773	2011 WE_{99}	—	October 11, 2006	Kitt Peak	Spacewatch	·	2.1 km	MPC · JPL
362774	2011 WS_{100}	—	January 12, 1996	Kitt Peak	Spacewatch	(5)	1.3 km	MPC · JPL
362775	2011 WT_{100}	—	December 8, 2004	Socorro	LINEAR	·	1.0 km	MPC · JPL
362776	2011 WT_{104}	—	April 9, 2005	Kitt Peak	Spacewatch	·	1.3 km	MPC · JPL
362777	2011 WK_{105}	—	September 12, 2005	Kitt Peak	Spacewatch	·	1.9 km	MPC · JPL
362778	2011 WY_{105}	—	July 30, 2010	WISE	WISE	·	3.1 km	MPC · JPL
362779	2011 WZ_{106}	—	March 26, 2003	Kitt Peak	Spacewatch	·	690 m	MPC · JPL
362780	2011 WB_{107}	—	December 19, 2003	Socorro	LINEAR	·	1.4 km	MPC · JPL
362781	2011 WK_{113}	—	April 13, 2004	Kitt Peak	Spacewatch	·	2.1 km	MPC · JPL
362782	2011 WE_{114}	—	April 21, 2004	Kitt Peak	Spacewatch	·	2.8 km	MPC · JPL
362783	2011 WN_{115}	—	January 16, 2004	Palomar	NEAT	EUN	1.6 km	MPC · JPL
362784	2011 WF_{120}	—	October 23, 2003	Kitt Peak	Spacewatch	·	1.6 km	MPC · JPL
362785	2011 WJ_{121}	—	November 22, 2006	Catalina	CSS	·	2.5 km	MPC · JPL
362786	2011 WT_{126}	—	April 15, 2010	WISE	WISE	·	3.1 km	MPC · JPL
362787	2011 WE_{129}	—	December 20, 2007	Kitt Peak	Spacewatch	·	1.3 km	MPC · JPL
362788	2011 WM_{132}	—	October 10, 2004	Kitt Peak	Spacewatch	·	840 m	MPC · JPL
362789	2011 WO_{132}	—	March 12, 2005	Mount Lemmon	Mount Lemmon Survey	·	1.4 km	MPC · JPL
362790	2011 WH_{133}	—	March 21, 2009	Kitt Peak	Spacewatch	(194)	2.3 km	MPC · JPL
362791	2011 WK_{138}	—	May 11, 2010	Mount Lemmon	Mount Lemmon Survey	·	660 m	MPC · JPL
362792	2011 WA_{140}	—	November 24, 2003	Kitt Peak	Spacewatch	·	1.1 km	MPC · JPL
362793 Suetolson	2011 WQ_{140}	Suetolson	August 23, 2006	Mauna Kea	D. D. Balam	·	2.3 km	MPC · JPL
362794	2011 WO_{141}	—	February 17, 2004	Catalina	CSS	·	3.1 km	MPC · JPL
362795	2011 WG_{147}	—	December 13, 2006	Kitt Peak	Spacewatch	BRA	2.9 km	MPC · JPL
362796	2011 WW_{148}	—	October 9, 2007	Mount Lemmon	Mount Lemmon Survey	HNS	1.6 km	MPC · JPL
362797	2011 WB_{152}	—	December 5, 2008	Mount Lemmon	Mount Lemmon Survey	·	830 m	MPC · JPL
362798	2011 WM_{153}	—	January 22, 2004	Palomar	NEAT	EUN	1.5 km	MPC · JPL
362799	2011 WX_{153}	—	September 19, 2006	Siding Spring	SSS	·	4.0 km	MPC · JPL
362800	2011 XP	—	October 2, 2006	Mount Lemmon	Mount Lemmon Survey	(13314)	1.9 km	MPC · JPL

== 362801–362900 ==
back to top

Designation			Discovery			Properties		Ref
Permanent	Provisional	Named after	Date	Site	Discoverer(s)	Category	Diam.	Ref
362801	2011 XG_{3}	—	November 21, 1995	Kitt Peak	Spacewatch	·	1.3 km	MPC · JPL
362802	2011 YY_{2}	—	December 8, 2005	Catalina	CSS	·	6.3 km	MPC · JPL
362803	2011 YF_{3}	—	November 8, 2007	Mount Lemmon	Mount Lemmon Survey	·	1.3 km	MPC · JPL
362804	2011 YR_{4}	—	February 2, 2008	Kitt Peak	Spacewatch	·	2.2 km	MPC · JPL
362805	2011 YZ_{4}	—	December 7, 1999	Socorro	LINEAR	HYG	4.0 km	MPC · JPL
362806	2011 YQ_{5}	—	November 6, 2005	Kitt Peak	Spacewatch	·	3.0 km	MPC · JPL
362807	2011 YJ_{12}	—	October 25, 2005	Mount Lemmon	Mount Lemmon Survey	THM	2.1 km	MPC · JPL
362808	2011 YM_{12}	—	November 18, 2006	Kitt Peak	Spacewatch	·	3.1 km	MPC · JPL
362809	2011 YF_{18}	—	June 28, 2010	WISE	WISE	·	3.1 km	MPC · JPL
362810	2011 YG_{27}	—	December 5, 2005	Kitt Peak	Spacewatch	fast	3.5 km	MPC · JPL
362811	2011 YB_{34}	—	December 11, 2006	Kitt Peak	Spacewatch	·	2.2 km	MPC · JPL
362812	2011 YV_{37}	—	May 4, 2002	Palomar	NEAT	·	3.6 km	MPC · JPL
362813	2011 YB_{46}	—	October 18, 2006	Kitt Peak	Spacewatch	·	2.0 km	MPC · JPL
362814	2011 YA_{47}	—	November 16, 2006	Kitt Peak	Spacewatch	·	2.4 km	MPC · JPL
362815	2011 YL_{50}	—	May 29, 2006	Vail-Jarnac	Jarnac	·	1.8 km	MPC · JPL
362816	2011 YT_{57}	—	February 25, 2007	Mount Lemmon	Mount Lemmon Survey	THM	2.5 km	MPC · JPL
362817	2011 YN_{70}	—	November 16, 1998	Kitt Peak	Spacewatch	·	1.9 km	MPC · JPL
362818	2011 YK_{73}	—	August 7, 2010	WISE	WISE	VER	4.4 km	MPC · JPL
362819	2011 YT_{73}	—	April 14, 2007	Catalina	CSS	(1118)	4.5 km	MPC · JPL
362820	2011 YW_{74}	—	December 25, 2005	Kitt Peak	Spacewatch	·	2.9 km	MPC · JPL
362821	2011 YL_{77}	—	March 11, 2003	Kitt Peak	Spacewatch	KOR	1.8 km	MPC · JPL
362822	2011 YV_{77}	—	April 21, 2006	Kitt Peak	Spacewatch	V	660 m	MPC · JPL
362823	2011 YP_{78}	—	November 6, 2005	Mount Lemmon	Mount Lemmon Survey	·	2.9 km	MPC · JPL
362824	2011 YB_{79}	—	March 10, 2003	Palomar	NEAT	·	2.4 km	MPC · JPL
362825	2012 AQ_{1}	—	November 1, 2005	Mount Lemmon	Mount Lemmon Survey	·	3.6 km	MPC · JPL
362826	2012 AR_{3}	—	November 24, 2006	Kitt Peak	Spacewatch	·	2.3 km	MPC · JPL
362827	2012 AA_{4}	—	February 11, 2008	Mount Lemmon	Mount Lemmon Survey	·	2.7 km	MPC · JPL
362828	2012 AS_{8}	—	April 21, 2002	Palomar	NEAT	·	4.1 km	MPC · JPL
362829	2012 AS_{12}	—	November 24, 2006	Mount Lemmon	Mount Lemmon Survey	URS	5.1 km	MPC · JPL
362830	2012 AZ_{13}	—	November 3, 2005	Mount Lemmon	Mount Lemmon Survey	·	2.7 km	MPC · JPL
362831	2012 AF_{17}	—	December 29, 2005	Socorro	LINEAR	·	4.8 km	MPC · JPL
362832	2012 AC_{19}	—	March 25, 2003	Palomar	NEAT	GEF	1.8 km	MPC · JPL
362833	2012 AJ_{19}	—	November 15, 2006	Mount Lemmon	Mount Lemmon Survey	·	2.4 km	MPC · JPL
362834	2012 AE_{21}	—	February 17, 2007	Kitt Peak	Spacewatch	·	3.8 km	MPC · JPL
362835	2012 AS_{22}	—	July 30, 2005	Palomar	NEAT	PAD	2.8 km	MPC · JPL
362836	2012 BH	—	December 1, 2006	Mount Lemmon	Mount Lemmon Survey	·	3.3 km	MPC · JPL
362837	2012 BU_{2}	—	January 27, 2007	Catalina	CSS	·	4.4 km	MPC · JPL
362838	2012 BR_{3}	—	July 14, 2010	WISE	WISE	·	6.3 km	MPC · JPL
362839	2012 BV_{10}	—	August 18, 2009	Kitt Peak	Spacewatch	·	4.0 km	MPC · JPL
362840	2012 BO_{12}	—	November 1, 1999	Kitt Peak	Spacewatch	·	1.4 km	MPC · JPL
362841	2012 BW_{15}	—	March 13, 2003	Kitt Peak	Spacewatch	·	2.2 km	MPC · JPL
362842	2012 BV_{20}	—	October 11, 2010	Mount Lemmon	Mount Lemmon Survey	·	3.3 km	MPC · JPL
362843	2012 BJ_{21}	—	November 30, 2005	Kitt Peak	Spacewatch	URS	4.5 km	MPC · JPL
362844	2012 BD_{22}	—	January 14, 2007	Lulin	LUSS	EOS	2.4 km	MPC · JPL
362845	2012 BE_{22}	—	August 31, 2005	Kitt Peak	Spacewatch	HOF	2.8 km	MPC · JPL
362846	2012 BS_{25}	—	January 26, 2003	Anderson Mesa	LONEOS	·	3.0 km	MPC · JPL
362847	2012 BD_{28}	—	August 6, 2010	WISE	WISE	·	3.0 km	MPC · JPL
362848	2012 BQ_{30}	—	April 12, 2002	Palomar	NEAT	·	3.8 km	MPC · JPL
362849	2012 BV_{30}	—	November 19, 2006	Catalina	CSS	·	2.7 km	MPC · JPL
362850	2012 BY_{31}	—	March 11, 2007	Kitt Peak	Spacewatch	·	2.9 km	MPC · JPL
362851	2012 BR_{32}	—	July 27, 2009	Kitt Peak	Spacewatch	·	3.6 km	MPC · JPL
362852	2012 BS_{32}	—	February 23, 2007	Catalina	CSS	EOS	2.4 km	MPC · JPL
362853	2012 BE_{33}	—	April 21, 2003	Kitt Peak	Spacewatch	·	2.4 km	MPC · JPL
362854	2012 BJ_{33}	—	April 10, 2002	Palomar	NEAT	URS	4.6 km	MPC · JPL
362855	2012 BN_{36}	—	October 27, 2005	Kitt Peak	Spacewatch	·	1.6 km	MPC · JPL
362856	2012 BP_{38}	—	January 24, 2007	Socorro	LINEAR	·	3.7 km	MPC · JPL
362857	2012 BL_{43}	—	January 2, 2012	Kitt Peak	Spacewatch	·	3.2 km	MPC · JPL
362858	2012 BO_{47}	—	November 11, 2010	Catalina	CSS	·	4.2 km	MPC · JPL
362859	2012 BS_{54}	—	March 12, 2007	Catalina	CSS	·	4.3 km	MPC · JPL
362860	2012 BJ_{58}	—	October 7, 2005	Junk Bond	D. Healy	·	2.4 km	MPC · JPL
362861	2012 BQ_{58}	—	September 14, 2005	Catalina	CSS	DOR	3.4 km	MPC · JPL
362862	2012 BS_{58}	—	November 16, 2006	Mount Lemmon	Mount Lemmon Survey	·	2.3 km	MPC · JPL
362863	2012 BB_{60}	—	December 25, 2005	Kitt Peak	Spacewatch	·	3.9 km	MPC · JPL
362864	2012 BE_{60}	—	June 21, 2009	Mount Lemmon	Mount Lemmon Survey	TIR	3.8 km	MPC · JPL
362865	2012 BA_{64}	—	January 31, 2008	Mount Lemmon	Mount Lemmon Survey	AGN	1.6 km	MPC · JPL
362866	2012 BA_{65}	—	July 14, 2004	Socorro	LINEAR	·	3.4 km	MPC · JPL
362867	2012 BO_{67}	—	March 7, 2008	Kitt Peak	Spacewatch	·	2.2 km	MPC · JPL
362868	2012 BD_{76}	—	June 3, 2008	Kitt Peak	Spacewatch	·	2.7 km	MPC · JPL
362869	2012 BH_{78}	—	May 18, 2002	Palomar	NEAT	THM	2.9 km	MPC · JPL
362870	2012 BU_{79}	—	March 28, 2008	Mount Lemmon	Mount Lemmon Survey	·	1.7 km	MPC · JPL
362871	2012 BW_{81}	—	November 1, 2010	Mount Lemmon	Mount Lemmon Survey	·	4.3 km	MPC · JPL
362872	2012 BZ_{87}	—	November 5, 1999	Kitt Peak	Spacewatch	·	2.1 km	MPC · JPL
362873	2012 BD_{89}	—	October 23, 2006	Mount Lemmon	Mount Lemmon Survey	·	2.1 km	MPC · JPL
362874	2012 BE_{89}	—	June 27, 1998	Kitt Peak	Spacewatch	EOS	2.3 km	MPC · JPL
362875	2012 BO_{91}	—	May 5, 2008	Mount Lemmon	Mount Lemmon Survey	EOS	2.2 km	MPC · JPL
362876	2012 BJ_{92}	—	March 13, 2007	Kitt Peak	Spacewatch	·	3.0 km	MPC · JPL
362877	2012 BP_{101}	—	December 31, 2005	Kitt Peak	Spacewatch	·	3.5 km	MPC · JPL
362878	2012 BK_{102}	—	March 15, 2008	Mount Lemmon	Mount Lemmon Survey	·	4.5 km	MPC · JPL
362879	2012 BO_{102}	—	November 16, 2006	Kitt Peak	Spacewatch	·	2.0 km	MPC · JPL
362880	2012 BW_{102}	—	October 17, 2010	Mount Lemmon	Mount Lemmon Survey	·	3.5 km	MPC · JPL
362881	2012 BR_{105}	—	March 9, 2007	Kitt Peak	Spacewatch	·	3.2 km	MPC · JPL
362882	2012 BJ_{106}	—	November 30, 2005	Kitt Peak	Spacewatch	·	3.7 km	MPC · JPL
362883	2012 BQ_{107}	—	April 25, 2004	Anderson Mesa	LONEOS	GAL	2.0 km	MPC · JPL
362884	2012 BE_{108}	—	January 13, 2003	Kitt Peak	Spacewatch	·	1.8 km	MPC · JPL
362885	2012 BF_{109}	—	October 6, 2005	Kitt Peak	Spacewatch	KOR	1.4 km	MPC · JPL
362886	2012 BG_{110}	—	October 17, 2006	Catalina	CSS	·	2.9 km	MPC · JPL
362887	2012 BG_{111}	—	November 6, 2005	Mount Lemmon	Mount Lemmon Survey	·	2.0 km	MPC · JPL
362888	2012 BU_{112}	—	March 23, 2006	Mount Lemmon	Mount Lemmon Survey	·	4.1 km	MPC · JPL
362889	2012 BA_{116}	—	December 13, 2006	Kitt Peak	Spacewatch	·	2.4 km	MPC · JPL
362890	2012 BC_{125}	—	March 13, 2007	Mount Lemmon	Mount Lemmon Survey	·	2.7 km	MPC · JPL
362891	2012 BT_{127}	—	September 27, 2009	Catalina	CSS	·	4.6 km	MPC · JPL
362892	2012 BF_{129}	—	September 16, 2001	Socorro	LINEAR	·	1.7 km	MPC · JPL
362893	2012 BH_{129}	—	August 29, 2005	Kitt Peak	Spacewatch	AGN	1.4 km	MPC · JPL
362894	2012 BK_{130}	—	March 7, 2008	Catalina	CSS	·	2.3 km	MPC · JPL
362895	2012 BS_{131}	—	March 31, 2002	Palomar	NEAT	·	2.8 km	MPC · JPL
362896	2012 BP_{132}	—	October 19, 2006	Catalina	CSS	·	2.4 km	MPC · JPL
362897	2012 BS_{144}	—	October 19, 2010	Mount Lemmon	Mount Lemmon Survey	·	3.2 km	MPC · JPL
362898	2012 BO_{145}	—	November 9, 2007	Catalina	CSS	·	1.1 km	MPC · JPL
362899	2012 BB_{146}	—	August 7, 2010	WISE	WISE	·	4.0 km	MPC · JPL
362900	2012 CV_{2}	—	September 12, 2005	Kitt Peak	Spacewatch	·	2.3 km	MPC · JPL

== 362901–363000 ==
back to top

Designation			Discovery			Properties		Ref
Permanent	Provisional	Named after	Date	Site	Discoverer(s)	Category	Diam.	Ref
362901	2012 CH_{5}	—	January 7, 2006	Socorro	LINEAR	·	3.7 km	MPC · JPL
362902	2012 CX_{5}	—	December 7, 2005	Kitt Peak	Spacewatch	(21885)	3.6 km	MPC · JPL
362903	2012 CC_{16}	—	August 5, 2003	Kitt Peak	Spacewatch	·	3.4 km	MPC · JPL
362904	2012 CO_{17}	—	February 7, 2008	Mount Lemmon	Mount Lemmon Survey	·	2.1 km	MPC · JPL
362905	2012 CB_{19}	—	December 1, 2005	Kitt Peak	Spacewatch	·	4.2 km	MPC · JPL
362906	2012 CH_{19}	—	October 24, 2005	Kitt Peak	Spacewatch	·	2.6 km	MPC · JPL
362907	2012 CU_{24}	—	January 10, 2006	Kitt Peak	Spacewatch	HYG	3.3 km	MPC · JPL
362908	2012 CP_{27}	—	November 2, 2007	Mount Lemmon	Mount Lemmon Survey	·	1.7 km	MPC · JPL
362909	2012 CE_{30}	—	April 4, 2008	Mount Lemmon	Mount Lemmon Survey	·	2.4 km	MPC · JPL
362910	2012 CM_{30}	—	February 25, 2007	Mount Lemmon	Mount Lemmon Survey	THM	2.6 km	MPC · JPL
362911 Miguelhurtado	2012 CA_{34}	Miguelhurtado	August 29, 2009	La Sagra	OAM	EOS	2.9 km	MPC · JPL
362912	2012 CJ_{36}	—	January 17, 2007	Palomar	NEAT	615	2.0 km	MPC · JPL
362913	2012 CM_{37}	—	November 4, 2005	Mount Lemmon	Mount Lemmon Survey	·	3.3 km	MPC · JPL
362914	2012 CV_{38}	—	March 27, 2003	Kitt Peak	Spacewatch	AGN	1.5 km	MPC · JPL
362915	2012 CS_{40}	—	July 9, 2005	Kitt Peak	Spacewatch	L4	9.5 km	MPC · JPL
362916	2012 CE_{42}	—	November 18, 2006	Mount Lemmon	Mount Lemmon Survey	·	2.0 km	MPC · JPL
362917	2012 CK_{43}	—	April 23, 2007	Catalina	CSS	·	3.7 km	MPC · JPL
362918	2012 CH_{51}	—	January 19, 2001	Kitt Peak	Spacewatch	·	4.1 km	MPC · JPL
362919	2012 CP_{52}	—	March 19, 2002	Anderson Mesa	LONEOS	EOS	2.6 km	MPC · JPL
362920	2012 DV_{2}	—	February 6, 2006	Mount Lemmon	Mount Lemmon Survey	·	4.1 km	MPC · JPL
362921	2012 DS_{3}	—	August 6, 2010	WISE	WISE	·	3.7 km	MPC · JPL
362922	2012 DK_{6}	—	April 12, 2002	Palomar	NEAT	EOS	3.1 km	MPC · JPL
362923	2012 DN_{10}	—	March 11, 2007	Kitt Peak	Spacewatch	·	4.3 km	MPC · JPL
362924	2012 DW_{18}	—	May 7, 2008	Mount Lemmon	Mount Lemmon Survey	EOS	2.6 km	MPC · JPL
362925	2012 DX_{30}	—	January 6, 2012	Haleakala	Pan-STARRS 1	·	1.4 km	MPC · JPL
362926	2012 DO_{42}	—	August 20, 2002	Palomar	NEAT	SYL · CYB	5.8 km	MPC · JPL
362927	2012 DO_{47}	—	October 11, 2006	Palomar	NEAT	EUN	1.6 km	MPC · JPL
362928	2012 DP_{68}	—	August 18, 2009	Kitt Peak	Spacewatch	·	3.7 km	MPC · JPL
362929	2012 DV_{77}	—	November 28, 2010	Kitt Peak	Spacewatch	·	4.8 km	MPC · JPL
362930	2012 DW_{77}	—	November 4, 2005	Kitt Peak	Spacewatch	·	5.7 km	MPC · JPL
362931	2012 ES_{4}	—	March 6, 1999	Kitt Peak	Spacewatch	SYL · CYB	6.1 km	MPC · JPL
362932	2012 FO_{2}	—	September 6, 2004	Siding Spring	SSS	·	2.5 km	MPC · JPL
362933	2012 FP_{7}	—	December 30, 2000	Kitt Peak	Spacewatch	·	1.7 km	MPC · JPL
362934	2012 HU_{21}	—	February 1, 2006	Kitt Peak	Spacewatch	EOS	2.7 km	MPC · JPL
362935	2012 JB_{5}	—	September 26, 2006	Siding Spring	SSS	·	3.3 km	MPC · JPL
362936	2012 UL_{84}	—	July 22, 2007	Siding Spring	SSS	·	2.3 km	MPC · JPL
362937	2012 VD_{80}	—	May 8, 2006	Mount Lemmon	Mount Lemmon Survey	H	700 m	MPC · JPL
362938	2012 WN_{33}	—	October 19, 2007	Mount Lemmon	Mount Lemmon Survey	URS	4.8 km	MPC · JPL
362939	2012 XF_{2}	—	October 23, 2001	Palomar	NEAT	·	4.3 km	MPC · JPL
362940	2012 XH_{50}	—	August 21, 2003	Campo Imperatore	CINEOS	·	3.5 km	MPC · JPL
362941	2012 XO_{101}	—	March 16, 2004	Siding Spring	SSS	·	2.9 km	MPC · JPL
362942	2012 XZ_{115}	—	February 16, 2010	Catalina	CSS	·	2.4 km	MPC · JPL
362943	2012 XR_{138}	—	February 1, 1997	Kitt Peak	Spacewatch	·	1.9 km	MPC · JPL
362944	2012 YX_{1}	—	September 10, 2007	Mount Lemmon	Mount Lemmon Survey	·	1.7 km	MPC · JPL
362945	2013 AJ_{2}	—	December 18, 2003	Socorro	LINEAR	·	2.1 km	MPC · JPL
362946	2013 AP_{23}	—	March 23, 2006	Kitt Peak	Spacewatch	MAS	650 m	MPC · JPL
362947	2013 AX_{27}	—	August 28, 2005	Anderson Mesa	LONEOS	·	5.3 km	MPC · JPL
362948	2013 AU_{36}	—	February 2, 2006	Mount Lemmon	Mount Lemmon Survey	NYS	840 m	MPC · JPL
362949	2013 AF_{37}	—	February 28, 2008	Kitt Peak	Spacewatch	·	2.7 km	MPC · JPL
362950	2013 AV_{40}	—	November 4, 2004	Catalina	CSS	NYS	1.3 km	MPC · JPL
362951	2013 AR_{56}	—	January 7, 2006	Kitt Peak	Spacewatch	·	840 m	MPC · JPL
362952	2013 AE_{58}	—	August 29, 2006	Kitt Peak	Spacewatch	GEF	1.8 km	MPC · JPL
362953	2013 AK_{69}	—	November 5, 2007	Mount Lemmon	Mount Lemmon Survey	·	2.2 km	MPC · JPL
362954	2013 AG_{74}	—	September 12, 2004	Kitt Peak	Spacewatch	·	4.0 km	MPC · JPL
362955	2013 AB_{78}	—	December 21, 2003	Kitt Peak	Spacewatch	·	2.6 km	MPC · JPL
362956	2013 AV_{86}	—	September 1, 2005	Kitt Peak	Spacewatch	·	890 m	MPC · JPL
362957	2013 AY_{91}	—	August 22, 2006	Palomar	NEAT	HOF	3.3 km	MPC · JPL
362958	2013 AP_{102}	—	August 5, 2005	Palomar	NEAT	·	3.3 km	MPC · JPL
362959	2013 BQ_{14}	—	February 7, 2002	Socorro	LINEAR	·	4.0 km	MPC · JPL
362960	2013 BF_{15}	—	January 23, 2006	Kitt Peak	Spacewatch	·	1.2 km	MPC · JPL
362961	2013 BT_{24}	—	October 4, 2005	Palomar	NEAT	·	4.3 km	MPC · JPL
362962	2013 BS_{34}	—	January 8, 2006	Mount Lemmon	Mount Lemmon Survey	·	1.1 km	MPC · JPL
362963	2013 BE_{53}	—	February 6, 2008	Catalina	CSS	·	2.5 km	MPC · JPL
362964	2013 BL_{55}	—	May 1, 2010	WISE	WISE	·	3.8 km	MPC · JPL
362965	2013 BU_{56}	—	October 20, 2012	Mount Lemmon	Mount Lemmon Survey	L4	9.3 km	MPC · JPL
362966	2013 BB_{58}	—	February 7, 2003	Kitt Peak	Spacewatch	·	850 m	MPC · JPL
362967	2013 BO_{67}	—	January 15, 2005	Kitt Peak	Spacewatch	·	1.8 km	MPC · JPL
362968	2013 BF_{76}	—	October 31, 2005	Mauna Kea	A. Boattini	NYS	1.0 km	MPC · JPL
362969	2013 BX_{76}	—	February 23, 2006	Kitt Peak	Spacewatch	MAS	750 m	MPC · JPL
362970	2013 BS_{79}	—	April 27, 2003	Anderson Mesa	LONEOS	·	3.6 km	MPC · JPL
362971	2013 CM_{8}	—	March 25, 2000	Kitt Peak	Spacewatch	·	2.0 km	MPC · JPL
362972	2013 CT_{16}	—	February 8, 2008	Mount Lemmon	Mount Lemmon Survey	·	2.2 km	MPC · JPL
362973	2013 CB_{17}	—	May 2, 2003	Kitt Peak	Spacewatch	·	880 m	MPC · JPL
362974	2013 CR_{23}	—	October 13, 2007	Catalina	CSS	·	1.4 km	MPC · JPL
362975	2013 CU_{33}	—	August 23, 2007	Kitt Peak	Spacewatch	·	1.3 km	MPC · JPL
362976	2013 CK_{36}	—	September 5, 2008	Kitt Peak	Spacewatch	L4	10 km	MPC · JPL
362977	2013 CU_{37}	—	November 2, 2007	Kitt Peak	Spacewatch	·	1.9 km	MPC · JPL
362978	2013 CG_{38}	—	November 26, 2003	Kitt Peak	Spacewatch	·	2.0 km	MPC · JPL
362979	2013 CR_{50}	—	March 29, 2004	Kitt Peak	Spacewatch	BRA	2.1 km	MPC · JPL
362980	2013 CM_{52}	—	December 30, 2005	Mount Lemmon	Mount Lemmon Survey	·	1.6 km	MPC · JPL
362981	2013 CK_{58}	—	February 18, 2001	Haleakala	NEAT	L4	20 km	MPC · JPL
362982	2013 CT_{58}	—	November 6, 2010	Catalina	CSS	L4	8.8 km	MPC · JPL
362983	2013 CQ_{59}	—	March 4, 2002	Kitt Peak	Spacewatch	·	2.8 km	MPC · JPL
362984	2013 CQ_{62}	—	October 20, 2008	Kitt Peak	Spacewatch	·	690 m	MPC · JPL
362985	2013 CU_{66}	—	February 11, 2004	Palomar	NEAT	·	2.2 km	MPC · JPL
362986	2013 CT_{72}	—	March 2, 2009	Mount Lemmon	Mount Lemmon Survey	·	2.8 km	MPC · JPL
362987	2013 CE_{87}	—	June 4, 2003	Kitt Peak	Spacewatch	TIR	3.5 km	MPC · JPL
362988	2013 CO_{90}	—	February 12, 2008	Mount Lemmon	Mount Lemmon Survey	·	2.8 km	MPC · JPL
362989	2013 CG_{113}	—	November 22, 2008	Mount Lemmon	Mount Lemmon Survey	MAS	680 m	MPC · JPL
362990	2013 CL_{116}	—	September 28, 2003	Kitt Peak	Spacewatch	·	1.4 km	MPC · JPL
362991	2013 CE_{120}	—	January 19, 2008	Mount Lemmon	Mount Lemmon Survey	EOS	2.5 km	MPC · JPL
362992	2013 CW_{121}	—	October 23, 2003	Apache Point	SDSS	EUN	1.3 km	MPC · JPL
362993	2013 CU_{130}	—	September 7, 2004	Kitt Peak	Spacewatch	·	4.3 km	MPC · JPL
362994	2013 CE_{137}	—	October 29, 2002	Apache Point	SDSS	·	1.7 km	MPC · JPL
362995	2013 CY_{138}	—	August 19, 2001	Cerro Tololo	Deep Ecliptic Survey	AGN	1.5 km	MPC · JPL
362996	2013 CU_{156}	—	March 11, 2005	Mount Lemmon	Mount Lemmon Survey	·	1.6 km	MPC · JPL
362997	2013 CD_{158}	—	September 15, 1993	Kitt Peak	Spacewatch	·	1.3 km	MPC · JPL
362998	2013 CU_{166}	—	August 18, 2006	Kitt Peak	Spacewatch	·	1.9 km	MPC · JPL
362999	2013 CY_{171}	—	February 13, 2002	Apache Point	SDSS	·	3.0 km	MPC · JPL
363000	2013 CN_{174}	—	February 27, 2003	Campo Imperatore	CINEOS	·	2.5 km	MPC · JPL

back to top

== See also ==
- Meanings of minor-planet names: 362001–363000
