= List of minor planets: 363001–364000 =

The following is a partial list of minor planets, running from minor-planet number 363001 through 364000, inclusive. The primary data for this and other partial lists is based on JPL's "Small-Body Orbital Elements" and data available from the Minor Planet Center. Critical list information is also provided by the MPC, unless otherwise specified from Lowell Observatory. A detailed description of the table's columns and additional sources are given on the main page including a complete list of every page in this series, and a statistical break-up on the dynamical classification of minor planets.

Also see the summary list of all named bodies in numerical and alphabetical order, and the corresponding naming citations for the number range of this particular list. New namings may only be added to this list after official publication, as the preannouncement of names is condemned by the Working Group for Small Bodies Nomenclature of the International Astronomical Union.

Near-Earth obj.	MBA (inner)	MBA (outer)	Centaur
Mars-crosser	MBA (middle)	Jupiter trojan	Trans-Neptunian obj.
Unclassified

== 363001–363100 ==
Designation			Discovery			Properties		Ref
Permanent	Provisional	Named after	Date	Site	Discoverer(s)	Category	Diam.	Ref
363001	2013 CS_{179}	—	August 27, 2006	Kitt Peak	Spacewatch	AGN	1.4 km	MPC · JPL
363002	2013 CM_{182}	—	June 22, 1998	Kitt Peak	Spacewatch	·	4.5 km	MPC · JPL
363003	2013 CR_{182}	—	November 9, 2007	Kitt Peak	Spacewatch	·	2.0 km	MPC · JPL
363004	2013 CH_{184}	—	April 12, 2005	Kitt Peak	Spacewatch	·	1.1 km	MPC · JPL
363005	2013 CE_{188}	—	October 25, 2005	Catalina	CSS	·	4.8 km	MPC · JPL
363006	2013 DC_{7}	—	October 30, 2002	Apache Point	SDSS	·	1.7 km	MPC · JPL
363007	2013 DY_{15}	—	January 29, 2004	Anderson Mesa	LONEOS	·	2.9 km	MPC · JPL
363008	2013 ES_{60}	—	March 3, 2000	Socorro	LINEAR	·	1.9 km	MPC · JPL
363009	2013 EM_{93}	—	March 20, 1999	Apache Point	SDSS	DOR	2.7 km	MPC · JPL
363010	1960 SA_{1}	—	January 15, 1996	Kitt Peak	Spacewatch	·	2.9 km	MPC · JPL
363011	1981 ED_{4}	—	March 2, 1981	Siding Spring	S. J. Bus	·	1.8 km	MPC · JPL
363012	1988 PH_{4}	—	August 14, 1988	Palomar	C. S. Shoemaker	·	1.7 km	MPC · JPL
363013	1993 TH_{17}	—	October 9, 1993	La Silla	E. W. Elst	·	1.4 km	MPC · JPL
363014	1993 VM_{6}	—	November 9, 1993	Kitt Peak	Spacewatch	·	4.2 km	MPC · JPL
363015	1995 SC_{60}	—	September 24, 1995	Kitt Peak	Spacewatch	·	1.3 km	MPC · JPL
363016	1995 TO_{5}	—	October 15, 1995	Kitt Peak	Spacewatch	·	860 m	MPC · JPL
363017	1995 VA_{10}	—	November 15, 1995	Kitt Peak	Spacewatch	·	1.4 km	MPC · JPL
363018 Wenda	1996 TA_{6}	Wenda	October 3, 1996	Xinglong	SCAP	·	1.3 km	MPC · JPL
363019	1996 TD_{8}	—	October 12, 1996	Haleakala	NEAT	·	1.6 km	MPC · JPL
363020	1997 AK_{24}	—	January 9, 1997	Kitt Peak	Spacewatch	·	2.5 km	MPC · JPL
363021	1997 EK_{1}	—	March 3, 1997	Kitt Peak	Spacewatch	·	1.6 km	MPC · JPL
363022	1997 EK_{29}	—	March 2, 1997	Kitt Peak	Spacewatch	·	2.5 km	MPC · JPL
363023	1997 RR_{2}	—	September 1, 1997	Caussols	ODAS	THB	4.1 km	MPC · JPL
363024	1998 OK_{1}	—	July 21, 1998	Socorro	LINEAR	APO · PHA	560 m	MPC · JPL
363025	1998 SB_{4}	—	September 18, 1998	Caussols	ODAS	·	3.2 km	MPC · JPL
363026	1998 SK_{19}	—	September 19, 1998	Kitt Peak	Spacewatch	·	2.4 km	MPC · JPL
363027	1998 ST_{27}	—	September 24, 1998	Socorro	LINEAR	ATE · PHA · moon	580 m	MPC · JPL
363028	1998 TQ_{24}	—	October 14, 1998	Kitt Peak	Spacewatch	·	800 m	MPC · JPL
363029	1998 UW_{25}	—	October 18, 1998	La Silla	E. W. Elst	·	4.7 km	MPC · JPL
363030	1998 VG_{40}	—	November 14, 1998	Kitt Peak	Spacewatch	·	930 m	MPC · JPL
363031	1998 XX_{13}	—	December 15, 1998	Caussols	ODAS	·	5.8 km	MPC · JPL
363032	1999 FU_{64}	—	March 20, 1999	Apache Point	SDSS	·	790 m	MPC · JPL
363033	1999 QN_{2}	—	August 30, 1999	Gnosca	S. Sposetti	·	1.2 km	MPC · JPL
363034	1999 RX_{79}	—	September 7, 1999	Socorro	LINEAR	MAS	980 m	MPC · JPL
363035	1999 RS_{170}	—	September 9, 1999	Socorro	LINEAR	·	1.5 km	MPC · JPL
363036	1999 RL_{172}	—	September 7, 1999	Socorro	LINEAR	·	1.2 km	MPC · JPL
363037	1999 RA_{200}	—	September 8, 1999	Socorro	LINEAR	·	1.9 km	MPC · JPL
363038	1999 TW_{39}	—	October 3, 1999	Catalina	CSS	·	3.4 km	MPC · JPL
363039	1999 TE_{50}	—	October 4, 1999	Kitt Peak	Spacewatch	·	1.6 km	MPC · JPL
363040	1999 TM_{125}	—	October 4, 1999	Socorro	LINEAR	·	1.2 km	MPC · JPL
363041	1999 TL_{166}	—	October 10, 1999	Socorro	LINEAR	·	1.8 km	MPC · JPL
363042	1999 TE_{191}	—	October 12, 1999	Socorro	LINEAR	·	4.2 km	MPC · JPL
363043	1999 TY_{215}	—	October 9, 1999	Socorro	LINEAR	·	1.3 km	MPC · JPL
363044	1999 TY_{243}	—	October 7, 1999	Catalina	CSS	·	2.2 km	MPC · JPL
363045	1999 TA_{275}	—	October 6, 1999	Socorro	LINEAR	·	1.3 km	MPC · JPL
363046	1999 TJ_{306}	—	October 6, 1999	Socorro	LINEAR	LIX	3.8 km	MPC · JPL
363047	1999 TR_{332}	—	October 13, 1999	Kitt Peak	Spacewatch	EOS	1.8 km	MPC · JPL
363048	1999 UO_{17}	—	September 14, 1999	Socorro	LINEAR	NYS	1.2 km	MPC · JPL
363049	1999 VG_{50}	—	November 3, 1999	Socorro	LINEAR	·	4.1 km	MPC · JPL
363050	1999 VA_{75}	—	November 5, 1999	Kitt Peak	Spacewatch	·	3.5 km	MPC · JPL
363051	1999 VS_{76}	—	November 5, 1999	Kitt Peak	Spacewatch	·	1.9 km	MPC · JPL
363052	1999 VO_{89}	—	November 5, 1999	Socorro	LINEAR	·	2.6 km	MPC · JPL
363053	1999 VS_{99}	—	November 9, 1999	Socorro	LINEAR	·	2.3 km	MPC · JPL
363054	1999 VZ_{100}	—	November 9, 1999	Socorro	LINEAR	·	1.6 km	MPC · JPL
363055	1999 VK_{105}	—	November 9, 1999	Socorro	LINEAR	·	1.6 km	MPC · JPL
363056	1999 VA_{129}	—	November 9, 1999	Kitt Peak	Spacewatch	·	3.4 km	MPC · JPL
363057	1999 VB_{135}	—	November 10, 1999	Kitt Peak	Spacewatch	LIX	3.7 km	MPC · JPL
363058	1999 VH_{152}	—	November 9, 1999	Kitt Peak	Spacewatch	·	3.7 km	MPC · JPL
363059	1999 VS_{183}	—	November 12, 1999	Socorro	LINEAR	·	3.4 km	MPC · JPL
363060	1999 VF_{207}	—	November 11, 1999	Kitt Peak	Spacewatch	·	2.8 km	MPC · JPL
363061	1999 XN_{221}	—	December 15, 1999	Socorro	LINEAR	·	1.9 km	MPC · JPL
363062	1999 XS_{259}	—	December 7, 1999	Socorro	LINEAR	·	4.3 km	MPC · JPL
363063	2000 AN_{117}	—	January 5, 2000	Socorro	LINEAR	EUN	1.7 km	MPC · JPL
363064	2000 BA_{46}	—	January 28, 2000	Kitt Peak	Spacewatch	(5)	1.1 km	MPC · JPL
363065	2000 BC_{48}	—	January 28, 2000	Kitt Peak	Spacewatch	·	1.2 km	MPC · JPL
363066	2000 CT_{73}	—	February 7, 2000	Kitt Peak	Spacewatch	·	1.3 km	MPC · JPL
363067	2000 CO_{101}	—	February 8, 2000	Socorro	LINEAR	APO · PHA · moon	580 m	MPC · JPL
363068	2000 DS_{91}	—	February 27, 2000	Kitt Peak	Spacewatch	(5)	1.1 km	MPC · JPL
363069	2000 EV_{106}	—	March 11, 2000	Socorro	LINEAR	AMO	420 m	MPC · JPL
363070	2000 GY_{116}	—	April 2, 2000	Kitt Peak	Spacewatch	·	950 m	MPC · JPL
363071	2000 GD_{147}	—	April 3, 2000	Mauna Kea	D. J. Tholen, Whiteley, R. J.	APO	310 m	MPC · JPL
363072	2000 GP_{165}	—	April 5, 2000	Socorro	LINEAR	·	2.1 km	MPC · JPL
363073	2000 LT_{29}	—	June 9, 2000	Haleakala	NEAT	·	2.0 km	MPC · JPL
363074	2000 NF_{23}	—	July 5, 2000	Anderson Mesa	LONEOS	PHO	1.4 km	MPC · JPL
363075	2000 OG_{8}	—	July 29, 2000	Anderson Mesa	LONEOS	AMO +1km	980 m	MPC · JPL
363076	2000 PH_{6}	—	August 3, 2000	Socorro	LINEAR	AMO +1km	900 m	MPC · JPL
363077	2000 QK	—	August 29, 2000	Socorro	LINEAR	·	740 m	MPC · JPL
363078	2000 QU_{23}	—	August 31, 2000	Socorro	LINEAR	·	980 m	MPC · JPL
363079	2000 QJ_{82}	—	August 31, 2000	Socorro	LINEAR	·	610 m	MPC · JPL
363080	2000 QY_{129}	—	August 29, 2000	Socorro	LINEAR	·	2.0 km	MPC · JPL
363081	2000 QD_{162}	—	August 31, 2000	Socorro	LINEAR	·	1.6 km	MPC · JPL
363082	2000 QV_{167}	—	August 31, 2000	Socorro	LINEAR	·	2.1 km	MPC · JPL
363083	2000 RZ_{27}	—	September 1, 2000	Socorro	LINEAR	·	1.9 km	MPC · JPL
363084	2000 RD_{53}	—	September 6, 2000	Socorro	LINEAR	AMO · PHA	320 m	MPC · JPL
363085	2000 RU_{57}	—	September 7, 2000	Kitt Peak	Spacewatch	·	730 m	MPC · JPL
363086	2000 RK_{80}	—	September 1, 2000	Socorro	LINEAR	V	780 m	MPC · JPL
363087	2000 RU_{102}	—	September 5, 2000	Anderson Mesa	LONEOS	·	2.9 km	MPC · JPL
363088	2000 SC_{26}	—	September 23, 2000	Socorro	LINEAR	·	690 m	MPC · JPL
363089	2000 SF_{93}	—	September 23, 2000	Socorro	LINEAR	·	2.6 km	MPC · JPL
363090	2000 SE_{98}	—	September 23, 2000	Socorro	LINEAR	·	880 m	MPC · JPL
363091	2000 SF_{102}	—	September 24, 2000	Socorro	LINEAR	·	680 m	MPC · JPL
363092	2000 SB_{110}	—	September 24, 2000	Socorro	LINEAR	·	1.8 km	MPC · JPL
363093	2000 SR_{129}	—	September 22, 2000	Socorro	LINEAR	·	3.5 km	MPC · JPL
363094	2000 SG_{173}	—	September 28, 2000	Socorro	LINEAR	·	2.8 km	MPC · JPL
363095	2000 SU_{216}	—	September 21, 2000	Haleakala	NEAT	·	2.4 km	MPC · JPL
363096	2000 SL_{301}	—	September 28, 2000	Socorro	LINEAR	·	1.1 km	MPC · JPL
363097	2000 SV_{307}	—	September 30, 2000	Socorro	LINEAR	·	980 m	MPC · JPL
363098	2000 SO_{317}	—	September 30, 2000	Socorro	LINEAR	·	2.4 km	MPC · JPL
363099	2000 SH_{346}	—	September 21, 2000	Kitt Peak	M. W. Buie	KOR	1.2 km	MPC · JPL
363100	2000 SZ_{346}	—	September 26, 2000	Socorro	LINEAR	·	3.2 km	MPC · JPL

== 363101–363200 ==
back to top

Designation			Discovery			Properties		Ref
Permanent	Provisional	Named after	Date	Site	Discoverer(s)	Category	Diam.	Ref
363101	2000 SY_{376}	—	September 21, 2000	Anderson Mesa	LONEOS	·	1.9 km	MPC · JPL
363102	2000 TG_{6}	—	October 1, 2000	Socorro	LINEAR	V	680 m	MPC · JPL
363103	2000 TU_{47}	—	October 1, 2000	Socorro	LINEAR	·	1.3 km	MPC · JPL
363104	2000 TD_{54}	—	October 1, 2000	Socorro	LINEAR	·	980 m	MPC · JPL
363105	2000 UZ_{16}	—	October 24, 2000	Socorro	LINEAR	·	950 m	MPC · JPL
363106	2000 UW_{19}	—	October 24, 2000	Socorro	LINEAR	·	2.2 km	MPC · JPL
363107	2000 UB_{92}	—	October 25, 2000	Socorro	LINEAR	·	1.2 km	MPC · JPL
363108	2000 WZ_{40}	—	November 20, 2000	Socorro	LINEAR	·	4.5 km	MPC · JPL
363109	2000 WW_{50}	—	November 20, 2000	Socorro	LINEAR	H	730 m	MPC · JPL
363110	2000 WP_{71}	—	November 19, 2000	Socorro	LINEAR	·	3.1 km	MPC · JPL
363111	2000 WF_{144}	—	November 21, 2000	Socorro	LINEAR	·	2.0 km	MPC · JPL
363112	2000 WV_{167}	—	November 24, 2000	Anderson Mesa	LONEOS	·	2.5 km	MPC · JPL
363113	2000 XU_{1}	—	December 3, 2000	Kitt Peak	Spacewatch	ERI	1.8 km	MPC · JPL
363114	2001 AG_{48}	—	January 15, 2001	Bergisch Gladbach	W. Bickel	EOS	2.1 km	MPC · JPL
363115 Chuckwood	2001 FW_{224}	Chuckwood	March 22, 2001	Kitt Peak	SKADS	THM	2.7 km	MPC · JPL
363116	2001 GQ_{2}	—	April 14, 2001	Socorro	LINEAR	APO · PHA	310 m	MPC · JPL
363117	2001 LN_{5}	—	June 15, 2001	Kitt Peak	Spacewatch	EUN	1.9 km	MPC · JPL
363118	2001 NH_{14}	—	July 14, 2001	Palomar	NEAT	·	1.3 km	MPC · JPL
363119	2001 NQ_{20}	—	July 14, 2001	Palomar	NEAT	·	1.9 km	MPC · JPL
363120	2001 OC_{59}	—	July 21, 2001	Haleakala	NEAT	·	1.5 km	MPC · JPL
363121	2001 ON_{91}	—	July 30, 2001	Palomar	NEAT	·	1.9 km	MPC · JPL
363122	2001 OO_{92}	—	July 22, 2001	Palomar	NEAT	·	1.8 km	MPC · JPL
363123	2001 PV_{16}	—	August 9, 2001	Palomar	NEAT	·	2.3 km	MPC · JPL
363124 Ciottolimeco	2001 PO_{28}	Ciottolimeco	August 13, 2001	San Marcello	L. Tesi, M. Tombelli	(5)	1.5 km	MPC · JPL
363125	2001 PS_{54}	—	August 14, 2001	Haleakala	NEAT	·	2.1 km	MPC · JPL
363126	2001 PM_{58}	—	August 14, 2001	Haleakala	NEAT	·	1.9 km	MPC · JPL
363127	2001 PY_{62}	—	August 13, 2001	Haleakala	NEAT	(5)	1.8 km	MPC · JPL
363128	2001 QW_{32}	—	August 17, 2001	Palomar	NEAT	·	1.9 km	MPC · JPL
363129	2001 QE_{39}	—	August 16, 2001	Socorro	LINEAR	·	2.4 km	MPC · JPL
363130	2001 QD_{69}	—	August 17, 2001	Socorro	LINEAR	·	1.5 km	MPC · JPL
363131	2001 QE_{109}	—	August 20, 2001	Palomar	NEAT	·	1.5 km	MPC · JPL
363132	2001 QQ_{147}	—	August 20, 2001	Palomar	NEAT	(1547)	2.1 km	MPC · JPL
363133	2001 QS_{189}	—	August 22, 2001	Socorro	LINEAR	EUN	1.9 km	MPC · JPL
363134	2001 QJ_{190}	—	August 22, 2001	Socorro	LINEAR	·	2.8 km	MPC · JPL
363135	2001 QQ_{199}	—	August 22, 2001	Palomar	NEAT	T_{j} (2.32) · unusual	16 km	MPC · JPL
363136	2001 QH_{212}	—	August 23, 2001	Anderson Mesa	LONEOS	·	1.6 km	MPC · JPL
363137	2001 QM_{221}	—	August 24, 2001	Anderson Mesa	LONEOS	·	1.8 km	MPC · JPL
363138	2001 QF_{246}	—	August 24, 2001	Socorro	LINEAR	·	2.1 km	MPC · JPL
363139	2001 QG_{258}	—	August 25, 2001	Socorro	LINEAR	·	1.9 km	MPC · JPL
363140	2001 QS_{259}	—	August 25, 2001	Socorro	LINEAR	·	2.0 km	MPC · JPL
363141	2001 QV_{287}	—	August 17, 2001	Socorro	LINEAR	(5)	1.3 km	MPC · JPL
363142	2001 QS_{323}	—	August 27, 2001	Anderson Mesa	LONEOS	·	1.6 km	MPC · JPL
363143	2001 RM_{3}	—	September 8, 2001	Anderson Mesa	LONEOS	·	1.7 km	MPC · JPL
363144	2001 RW_{36}	—	September 8, 2001	Socorro	LINEAR	·	1.1 km	MPC · JPL
363145	2001 RP_{78}	—	September 10, 2001	Socorro	LINEAR	·	2.2 km	MPC · JPL
363146	2001 RU_{85}	—	September 11, 2001	Anderson Mesa	LONEOS	·	3.9 km	MPC · JPL
363147	2001 RA_{90}	—	September 11, 2001	Anderson Mesa	LONEOS	·	1.7 km	MPC · JPL
363148	2001 RO_{149}	—	September 11, 2001	Anderson Mesa	LONEOS	·	1.5 km	MPC · JPL
363149	2001 SW_{7}	—	August 25, 2001	Anderson Mesa	LONEOS	·	1.2 km	MPC · JPL
363150	2001 SD_{22}	—	September 16, 2001	Socorro	LINEAR	(5)	1.3 km	MPC · JPL
363151	2001 SH_{36}	—	September 16, 2001	Socorro	LINEAR	·	1.4 km	MPC · JPL
363152	2001 SN_{65}	—	September 17, 2001	Socorro	LINEAR	·	2.2 km	MPC · JPL
363153	2001 SD_{77}	—	September 17, 2001	Socorro	LINEAR	(5)	1.4 km	MPC · JPL
363154	2001 SL_{83}	—	August 25, 2001	Socorro	LINEAR	·	770 m	MPC · JPL
363155	2001 SP_{86}	—	September 20, 2001	Socorro	LINEAR	MAR	1.0 km	MPC · JPL
363156	2001 SK_{101}	—	September 20, 2001	Socorro	LINEAR	(5)	1.1 km	MPC · JPL
363157	2001 SV_{101}	—	September 20, 2001	Socorro	LINEAR	·	720 m	MPC · JPL
363158	2001 SL_{122}	—	September 16, 2001	Socorro	LINEAR	·	540 m	MPC · JPL
363159	2001 SZ_{130}	—	September 16, 2001	Socorro	LINEAR	·	820 m	MPC · JPL
363160	2001 SM_{135}	—	September 16, 2001	Socorro	LINEAR	·	1.4 km	MPC · JPL
363161	2001 SF_{168}	—	September 19, 2001	Socorro	LINEAR	·	880 m	MPC · JPL
363162	2001 SL_{243}	—	September 19, 2001	Socorro	LINEAR	·	1.6 km	MPC · JPL
363163	2001 SE_{286}	—	September 27, 2001	Socorro	LINEAR	AMO +1km	1.0 km	MPC · JPL
363164	2001 SF_{290}	—	September 29, 2001	Palomar	NEAT	·	2.6 km	MPC · JPL
363165	2001 SX_{305}	—	September 20, 2001	Socorro	LINEAR	·	2.6 km	MPC · JPL
363166	2001 SD_{345}	—	September 23, 2001	Palomar	NEAT	·	2.1 km	MPC · JPL
363167	2001 ST_{354}	—	September 19, 2001	Apache Point	SDSS	·	2.1 km	MPC · JPL
363168	2001 TU_{27}	—	October 14, 2001	Socorro	LINEAR	·	1.4 km	MPC · JPL
363169	2001 TT_{29}	—	October 14, 2001	Socorro	LINEAR	·	2.4 km	MPC · JPL
363170	2001 TJ_{30}	—	October 14, 2001	Socorro	LINEAR	·	2.0 km	MPC · JPL
363171	2001 TG_{49}	—	October 15, 2001	Desert Eagle	W. K. Y. Yeung	·	1.8 km	MPC · JPL
363172	2001 TN_{87}	—	October 14, 2001	Socorro	LINEAR	·	2.2 km	MPC · JPL
363173	2001 TQ_{87}	—	October 14, 2001	Socorro	LINEAR	JUN	1.2 km	MPC · JPL
363174	2001 TR_{87}	—	October 14, 2001	Socorro	LINEAR	·	1.6 km	MPC · JPL
363175	2001 TZ_{109}	—	October 14, 2001	Socorro	LINEAR	·	800 m	MPC · JPL
363176	2001 TA_{127}	—	October 13, 2001	Kitt Peak	Spacewatch	·	2.0 km	MPC · JPL
363177	2001 TU_{127}	—	October 15, 2001	Socorro	LINEAR	H	800 m	MPC · JPL
363178	2001 TH_{136}	—	October 14, 2001	Palomar	NEAT	·	830 m	MPC · JPL
363179	2001 TK_{149}	—	October 10, 2001	Palomar	NEAT	·	880 m	MPC · JPL
363180	2001 TL_{153}	—	October 11, 2001	Palomar	NEAT	·	1.4 km	MPC · JPL
363181	2001 TQ_{153}	—	October 13, 2001	Palomar	NEAT	·	2.1 km	MPC · JPL
363182	2001 TF_{163}	—	September 19, 2001	Kitt Peak	Spacewatch	(13314)	1.4 km	MPC · JPL
363183	2001 TT_{176}	—	October 14, 2001	Socorro	LINEAR	·	1.4 km	MPC · JPL
363184	2001 TT_{182}	—	October 14, 2001	Socorro	LINEAR	·	1.9 km	MPC · JPL
363185	2001 TK_{184}	—	October 14, 2001	Socorro	LINEAR	·	2.4 km	MPC · JPL
363186	2001 TD_{209}	—	October 12, 2001	Anderson Mesa	LONEOS	·	2.8 km	MPC · JPL
363187	2001 TF_{232}	—	October 15, 2001	Haleakala	NEAT	·	1.6 km	MPC · JPL
363188	2001 TZ_{238}	—	October 15, 2001	Palomar	NEAT	·	1.7 km	MPC · JPL
363189	2001 TA_{239}	—	October 15, 2001	Palomar	NEAT	·	2.4 km	MPC · JPL
363190	2001 TV_{250}	—	October 14, 2001	Apache Point	SDSS	·	2.1 km	MPC · JPL
363191	2001 TN_{255}	—	October 14, 2001	Apache Point	SDSS	·	1.7 km	MPC · JPL
363192	2001 UL_{6}	—	October 19, 2001	Haleakala	NEAT	H	540 m	MPC · JPL
363193	2001 UC_{10}	—	October 21, 2001	Kitt Peak	Spacewatch	·	900 m	MPC · JPL
363194	2001 UU_{26}	—	October 17, 2001	Kitt Peak	Spacewatch	·	580 m	MPC · JPL
363195	2001 UJ_{55}	—	October 17, 2001	Socorro	LINEAR	·	1.9 km	MPC · JPL
363196	2001 UQ_{57}	—	October 17, 2001	Socorro	LINEAR	·	1.3 km	MPC · JPL
363197	2001 UZ_{76}	—	October 17, 2001	Socorro	LINEAR	·	1.9 km	MPC · JPL
363198	2001 UY_{80}	—	October 20, 2001	Socorro	LINEAR	·	2.4 km	MPC · JPL
363199	2001 UM_{81}	—	October 20, 2001	Socorro	LINEAR	·	1.7 km	MPC · JPL
363200	2001 UV_{112}	—	October 21, 2001	Socorro	LINEAR	·	2.6 km	MPC · JPL

== 363201–363300 ==
back to top

Designation			Discovery			Properties		Ref
Permanent	Provisional	Named after	Date	Site	Discoverer(s)	Category	Diam.	Ref
363201	2001 US_{124}	—	October 22, 2001	Palomar	NEAT	EUN	1.5 km	MPC · JPL
363202	2001 UX_{125}	—	October 23, 2001	Palomar	NEAT	·	1.8 km	MPC · JPL
363203	2001 UY_{132}	—	October 21, 2001	Socorro	LINEAR	·	2.0 km	MPC · JPL
363204	2001 UK_{135}	—	October 22, 2001	Socorro	LINEAR	·	1.5 km	MPC · JPL
363205	2001 US_{151}	—	October 23, 2001	Socorro	LINEAR	·	1.5 km	MPC · JPL
363206	2001 UU_{155}	—	October 23, 2001	Socorro	LINEAR	·	2.4 km	MPC · JPL
363207	2001 UB_{163}	—	October 23, 2001	Socorro	LINEAR	·	2.0 km	MPC · JPL
363208	2001 UY_{163}	—	September 23, 2001	Kitt Peak	Spacewatch	H	480 m	MPC · JPL
363209	2001 UB_{174}	—	October 18, 2001	Palomar	NEAT	·	710 m	MPC · JPL
363210	2001 UC_{212}	—	October 14, 2001	Socorro	LINEAR	·	900 m	MPC · JPL
363211	2001 UF_{218}	—	October 25, 2001	Socorro	LINEAR	·	1.6 km	MPC · JPL
363212	2001 UA_{220}	—	October 18, 2001	Palomar	NEAT	(18466)	2.2 km	MPC · JPL
363213	2001 UM_{227}	—	October 16, 2001	Palomar	NEAT	·	2.0 km	MPC · JPL
363214	2001 UV_{227}	—	October 19, 2001	Palomar	NEAT	·	1.4 km	MPC · JPL
363215	2001 UG_{229}	—	February 28, 2008	Kitt Peak	Spacewatch	·	1.9 km	MPC · JPL
363216	2001 VF_{8}	—	November 9, 2001	Socorro	LINEAR	·	2.2 km	MPC · JPL
363217	2001 VT_{54}	—	November 10, 2001	Socorro	LINEAR	·	780 m	MPC · JPL
363218	2001 VM_{75}	—	November 15, 2001	Socorro	LINEAR	·	1.6 km	MPC · JPL
363219	2001 VH_{79}	—	November 9, 2001	Palomar	NEAT	·	820 m	MPC · JPL
363220	2001 VN_{80}	—	November 10, 2001	Palomar	NEAT	·	890 m	MPC · JPL
363221	2001 VX_{81}	—	November 12, 2001	Socorro	LINEAR	·	1.2 km	MPC · JPL
363222	2001 VW_{82}	—	November 10, 2001	Socorro	LINEAR	·	2.9 km	MPC · JPL
363223	2001 VO_{112}	—	November 12, 2001	Socorro	LINEAR	·	590 m	MPC · JPL
363224	2001 VE_{122}	—	November 13, 2001	Haleakala	NEAT	·	2.0 km	MPC · JPL
363225	2001 VD_{126}	—	November 14, 2001	Kitt Peak	Spacewatch	EOS	1.8 km	MPC · JPL
363226	2001 WQ_{1}	—	November 17, 2001	Kitt Peak	Spacewatch	·	610 m	MPC · JPL
363227	2001 WY_{31}	—	October 23, 2001	Socorro	LINEAR	·	2.1 km	MPC · JPL
363228	2001 WR_{54}	—	November 19, 2001	Socorro	LINEAR	·	1.6 km	MPC · JPL
363229	2001 WW_{85}	—	November 20, 2001	Socorro	LINEAR	BAR	1.6 km	MPC · JPL
363230	2001 WX_{101}	—	November 18, 2001	Kitt Peak	Spacewatch	·	2.2 km	MPC · JPL
363231	2001 XH_{14}	—	December 9, 2001	Socorro	LINEAR	·	2.7 km	MPC · JPL
363232	2001 XV_{47}	—	December 9, 2001	Socorro	LINEAR	BAR	2.6 km	MPC · JPL
363233	2001 XR_{70}	—	December 11, 2001	Socorro	LINEAR	·	2.1 km	MPC · JPL
363234	2001 XU_{168}	—	December 14, 2001	Socorro	LINEAR	·	990 m	MPC · JPL
363235	2001 XC_{227}	—	December 15, 2001	Socorro	LINEAR	·	850 m	MPC · JPL
363236	2001 XQ_{262}	—	December 13, 2001	Palomar	NEAT	·	1.7 km	MPC · JPL
363237	2001 YX	—	December 17, 2001	Socorro	LINEAR	·	1.4 km	MPC · JPL
363238	2001 YY_{3}	—	December 22, 2001	Socorro	LINEAR	H	680 m	MPC · JPL
363239	2001 YK_{149}	—	December 19, 2001	Palomar	NEAT	·	940 m	MPC · JPL
363240	2002 AA_{31}	—	January 9, 2002	Socorro	LINEAR	·	730 m	MPC · JPL
363241	2002 AO_{113}	—	January 9, 2002	Socorro	LINEAR	·	620 m	MPC · JPL
363242	2002 AB_{116}	—	January 9, 2002	Socorro	LINEAR	·	660 m	MPC · JPL
363243	2002 AQ_{129}	—	January 14, 2002	Socorro	LINEAR	H	680 m	MPC · JPL
363244	2002 AD_{130}	—	January 8, 2002	Socorro	LINEAR	H	650 m	MPC · JPL
363245	2002 AS_{169}	—	December 18, 2001	Socorro	LINEAR	·	2.2 km	MPC · JPL
363246	2002 AH_{179}	—	January 14, 2002	Socorro	LINEAR	·	1.1 km	MPC · JPL
363247	2002 BW_{4}	—	January 19, 2002	Anderson Mesa	LONEOS	H	680 m	MPC · JPL
363248	2002 BE_{14}	—	January 19, 2002	Socorro	LINEAR	H	690 m	MPC · JPL
363249	2002 CS_{4}	—	February 5, 2002	Haleakala	NEAT	PHO	1.3 km	MPC · JPL
363250	2002 CK_{34}	—	February 6, 2002	Socorro	LINEAR	TEL	1.9 km	MPC · JPL
363251	2002 CZ_{68}	—	January 9, 2002	Socorro	LINEAR	·	2.0 km	MPC · JPL
363252	2002 CX_{84}	—	February 7, 2002	Socorro	LINEAR	·	870 m	MPC · JPL
363253	2002 CS_{119}	—	February 7, 2002	Socorro	LINEAR	·	1.9 km	MPC · JPL
363254	2002 CB_{124}	—	February 7, 2002	Socorro	LINEAR	·	830 m	MPC · JPL
363255	2002 CA_{199}	—	February 10, 2002	Socorro	LINEAR	·	740 m	MPC · JPL
363256	2002 CT_{200}	—	February 10, 2002	Socorro	LINEAR	·	910 m	MPC · JPL
363257	2002 CT_{246}	—	February 13, 2002	Kitt Peak	Spacewatch	·	630 m	MPC · JPL
363258	2002 CW_{264}	—	February 8, 2002	Kitt Peak	M. W. Buie	·	720 m	MPC · JPL
363259	2002 CX_{271}	—	February 8, 2002	Kitt Peak	Spacewatch	EOS	1.8 km	MPC · JPL
363260	2002 DY_{5}	—	January 22, 2002	Socorro	LINEAR	·	1.7 km	MPC · JPL
363261	2002 DO_{15}	—	February 16, 2002	Palomar	NEAT	(2076)	950 m	MPC · JPL
363262	2002 EK_{2}	—	March 9, 2002	Palomar	NEAT	PHO	970 m	MPC · JPL
363263	2002 EN_{4}	—	March 10, 2002	Cima Ekar	ADAS	·	2.0 km	MPC · JPL
363264	2002 EO_{16}	—	March 6, 2002	Palomar	NEAT	·	1.0 km	MPC · JPL
363265	2002 EL_{150}	—	March 15, 2002	Palomar	NEAT	·	1.1 km	MPC · JPL
363266	2002 EC_{160}	—	March 4, 2002	Palomar	NEAT	·	860 m	MPC · JPL
363267	2002 GS	—	April 3, 2002	Anderson Mesa	LONEOS	APO	350 m	MPC · JPL
363268	2002 GC_{3}	—	April 5, 2002	Palomar	NEAT	·	2.5 km	MPC · JPL
363269	2002 GD_{4}	—	April 9, 2002	Palomar	NEAT	EUP	3.3 km	MPC · JPL
363270	2002 GE_{6}	—	April 8, 2002	Kitt Peak	Spacewatch	PHO	1.0 km	MPC · JPL
363271	2002 GR_{12}	—	March 23, 2002	Socorro	LINEAR	·	1.2 km	MPC · JPL
363272	2002 GE_{34}	—	April 1, 2002	Palomar	NEAT	ERI	2.4 km	MPC · JPL
363273	2002 GP_{52}	—	April 5, 2002	Anderson Mesa	LONEOS	·	2.4 km	MPC · JPL
363274	2002 GW_{58}	—	April 8, 2002	Palomar	NEAT	MAS	750 m	MPC · JPL
363275	2002 GG_{86}	—	April 10, 2002	Socorro	LINEAR	V	860 m	MPC · JPL
363276	2002 GB_{96}	—	April 9, 2002	Socorro	LINEAR	·	1.2 km	MPC · JPL
363277	2002 GJ_{107}	—	April 11, 2002	Socorro	LINEAR	·	1.1 km	MPC · JPL
363278	2002 GJ_{115}	—	April 11, 2002	Socorro	LINEAR	·	1.0 km	MPC · JPL
363279	2002 GY_{120}	—	April 12, 2002	Palomar	NEAT	·	1.4 km	MPC · JPL
363280	2002 GS_{137}	—	April 12, 2002	Socorro	LINEAR	·	2.3 km	MPC · JPL
363281	2002 GW_{153}	—	April 12, 2002	Palomar	NEAT	·	2.8 km	MPC · JPL
363282	2002 GJ_{160}	—	April 15, 2002	Socorro	LINEAR	·	2.9 km	MPC · JPL
363283	2002 GT_{169}	—	April 9, 2002	Socorro	LINEAR	·	4.7 km	MPC · JPL
363284	2002 GM_{181}	—	April 13, 2002	Palomar	NEAT	·	1.2 km	MPC · JPL
363285	2002 GN_{181}	—	April 2, 2002	Palomar	NEAT	EOS	2.4 km	MPC · JPL
363286	2002 GT_{184}	—	April 12, 2002	Palomar	NEAT	·	3.0 km	MPC · JPL
363287	2002 GK_{185}	—	October 18, 2007	Mount Lemmon	Mount Lemmon Survey	·	960 m	MPC · JPL
363288	2002 HA_{17}	—	March 20, 2002	Kitt Peak	Spacewatch	EMA	3.2 km	MPC · JPL
363289	2002 JU_{31}	—	May 9, 2002	Socorro	LINEAR	·	1.4 km	MPC · JPL
363290	2002 JS_{57}	—	May 9, 2002	Socorro	LINEAR	H	660 m	MPC · JPL
363291	2002 JK_{85}	—	May 11, 2002	Socorro	LINEAR	·	6.4 km	MPC · JPL
363292	2002 JY_{89}	—	May 11, 2002	Socorro	LINEAR	·	940 m	MPC · JPL
363293	2002 JU_{95}	—	May 11, 2002	Socorro	LINEAR	·	1.2 km	MPC · JPL
363294	2002 JT_{106}	—	April 21, 2002	Palomar	NEAT	·	3.5 km	MPC · JPL
363295	2002 JO_{120}	—	May 5, 2002	Palomar	NEAT	·	1.7 km	MPC · JPL
363296	2002 JG_{123}	—	April 11, 2002	Palomar	NEAT	H	840 m	MPC · JPL
363297	2002 JZ_{123}	—	May 6, 2002	Palomar	NEAT	·	4.2 km	MPC · JPL
363298	2002 KL_{3}	—	May 18, 2002	Socorro	LINEAR	APO	710 m	MPC · JPL
363299	2002 LN_{6}	—	June 1, 2002	Palomar	NEAT	·	4.7 km	MPC · JPL
363300	2002 LF_{40}	—	June 10, 2002	Socorro	LINEAR	·	1.2 km	MPC · JPL

== 363301–363400 ==
back to top

Designation			Discovery			Properties		Ref
Permanent	Provisional	Named after	Date	Site	Discoverer(s)	Category	Diam.	Ref
363301	2002 LZ_{60}	—	June 3, 2002	Palomar	NEAT	·	1.3 km	MPC · JPL
363302	2002 ME_{5}	—	July 5, 2002	Socorro	LINEAR	PHO	3.2 km	MPC · JPL
363303	2002 MX_{6}	—	November 10, 2009	Mount Lemmon	Mount Lemmon Survey	·	3.4 km	MPC · JPL
363304	2002 NG_{7}	—	July 9, 2002	Palomar	NEAT	·	3.6 km	MPC · JPL
363305	2002 NV_{16}	—	July 13, 2002	Socorro	LINEAR	APO · PHA · fast	180 m	MPC · JPL
363306	2002 NR_{21}	—	July 9, 2002	Socorro	LINEAR	·	4.9 km	MPC · JPL
363307	2002 NP_{28}	—	July 12, 2002	Palomar	NEAT	·	1.8 km	MPC · JPL
363308	2002 NL_{49}	—	July 14, 2002	Palomar	NEAT	·	2.7 km	MPC · JPL
363309	2002 NW_{53}	—	July 5, 2002	Kitt Peak	Spacewatch	MAS	730 m	MPC · JPL
363310	2002 NK_{60}	—	July 1, 2002	Palomar	NEAT	·	1.3 km	MPC · JPL
363311	2002 NV_{63}	—	July 8, 2002	Palomar	NEAT	NYS	1.2 km	MPC · JPL
363312	2002 NU_{67}	—	July 12, 2002	Palomar	NEAT	EUN	1.1 km	MPC · JPL
363313	2002 NU_{74}	—	July 3, 2002	Palomar	NEAT	·	970 m	MPC · JPL
363314	2002 NS_{77}	—	September 14, 2006	Catalina	CSS	·	1.9 km	MPC · JPL
363315	2002 ND_{80}	—	February 3, 2010	WISE	WISE	EUP	6.1 km	MPC · JPL
363316	2002 NX_{80}	—	January 19, 2012	Mount Lemmon	Mount Lemmon Survey	·	3.3 km	MPC · JPL
363317	2002 OQ_{4}	—	July 18, 2002	Palomar	NEAT	·	880 m	MPC · JPL
363318	2002 OG_{18}	—	July 18, 2002	Socorro	LINEAR	·	1.3 km	MPC · JPL
363319	2002 OR_{33}	—	July 21, 2002	Palomar	NEAT	·	900 m	MPC · JPL
363320	2002 OV_{33}	—	July 22, 2002	Palomar	NEAT	PHO	1.5 km	MPC · JPL
363321	2002 PQ_{2}	—	August 3, 2002	Palomar	NEAT	·	3.4 km	MPC · JPL
363322	2002 PB_{25}	—	August 6, 2002	Palomar	NEAT	·	1.3 km	MPC · JPL
363323	2002 PW_{55}	—	August 9, 2002	Socorro	LINEAR	T_{j} (2.95)	3.9 km	MPC · JPL
363324	2002 PZ_{64}	—	August 5, 2002	Palomar	NEAT	·	1.4 km	MPC · JPL
363325	2002 PX_{66}	—	July 18, 2002	Palomar	NEAT	·	1.2 km	MPC · JPL
363326	2002 PF_{112}	—	August 5, 2002	Palomar	NEAT	PHO	940 m	MPC · JPL
363327	2002 PO_{114}	—	August 13, 2002	Kitt Peak	Spacewatch	·	970 m	MPC · JPL
363328	2002 PY_{122}	—	August 5, 2002	Palomar	NEAT	EOS	2.2 km	MPC · JPL
363329	2002 PC_{123}	—	August 15, 2002	Palomar	NEAT	V	610 m	MPC · JPL
363330	2002 PQ_{145}	—	August 9, 2002	Cerro Tololo	M. W. Buie	cubewano (cold)	233 km	MPC · JPL
363331	2002 PN_{151}	—	August 8, 2002	Palomar	NEAT	MAS	780 m	MPC · JPL
363332	2002 PN_{157}	—	August 8, 2002	Palomar	S. F. Hönig	CYB	3.1 km	MPC · JPL
363333	2002 PQ_{157}	—	August 8, 2002	Palomar	S. F. Hönig	MAS	720 m	MPC · JPL
363334	2002 PD_{174}	—	August 8, 2002	Palomar	NEAT	NYS	850 m	MPC · JPL
363335	2002 PD_{178}	—	August 7, 2002	Palomar	NEAT	·	3.8 km	MPC · JPL
363336	2002 PY_{178}	—	August 4, 2002	Palomar	NEAT	(31811)	4.3 km	MPC · JPL
363337	2002 PN_{190}	—	August 8, 2002	Palomar	NEAT	·	1 km	MPC · JPL
363338	2002 PH_{192}	—	August 15, 2002	Palomar	NEAT	·	2.9 km	MPC · JPL
363339	2002 PL_{192}	—	August 15, 2002	Palomar	NEAT	EUN	1.4 km	MPC · JPL
363340	2002 PX_{197}	—	September 15, 2006	Kitt Peak	Spacewatch	NYS	1.0 km	MPC · JPL
363341	2002 QQ_{1}	—	August 16, 2002	Haleakala	NEAT	·	4.5 km	MPC · JPL
363342	2002 QB_{2}	—	August 16, 2002	Palomar	NEAT	HYG	3.0 km	MPC · JPL
363343	2002 QA_{6}	—	August 17, 2002	Socorro	LINEAR	T_{j} (2.97)	6.3 km	MPC · JPL
363344	2002 QC_{7}	—	August 19, 2002	Palomar	NEAT	APO	360 m	MPC · JPL
363345	2002 QE_{56}	—	August 29, 2002	Palomar	S. F. Hönig	NYS	960 m	MPC · JPL
363346	2002 QG_{61}	—	August 16, 2002	Palomar	NEAT	·	1.0 km	MPC · JPL
363347	2002 QW_{80}	—	August 19, 2002	Palomar	NEAT	·	1.3 km	MPC · JPL
363348	2002 QP_{101}	—	August 16, 2002	Palomar	NEAT	·	1.1 km	MPC · JPL
363349	2002 QX_{129}	—	August 19, 2002	Palomar	NEAT	·	2.1 km	MPC · JPL
363350	2002 QQ_{131}	—	August 30, 2002	Palomar	NEAT	·	1.4 km	MPC · JPL
363351	2002 QY_{149}	—	October 8, 2008	Mount Lemmon	Mount Lemmon Survey	·	3.0 km	MPC · JPL
363352	2002 QK_{152}	—	December 19, 2007	Mount Lemmon	Mount Lemmon Survey	(5)	1.5 km	MPC · JPL
363353	2002 RM_{21}	—	September 4, 2002	Anderson Mesa	LONEOS	·	1.4 km	MPC · JPL
363354	2002 RY_{80}	—	September 5, 2002	Socorro	LINEAR	MAS	850 m	MPC · JPL
363355	2002 RR_{127}	—	September 10, 2002	Palomar	NEAT	·	2.0 km	MPC · JPL
363356	2002 RZ_{141}	—	September 11, 2002	Palomar	NEAT	·	4.3 km	MPC · JPL
363357	2002 RD_{146}	—	September 5, 2002	Socorro	LINEAR	·	2.3 km	MPC · JPL
363358	2002 RX_{205}	—	September 14, 2002	Palomar	NEAT	(5)	1.0 km	MPC · JPL
363359	2002 RB_{220}	—	September 15, 2002	Palomar	NEAT	·	1.4 km	MPC · JPL
363360	2002 RG_{246}	—	September 4, 2002	Palomar	NEAT	·	780 m	MPC · JPL
363361	2002 RT_{250}	—	September 3, 2002	Haleakala	NEAT	(31811)	3.9 km	MPC · JPL
363362	2002 SE_{21}	—	September 26, 2002	Palomar	NEAT	·	1.2 km	MPC · JPL
363363	2002 SZ_{42}	—	September 28, 2002	Haleakala	NEAT	·	2.6 km	MPC · JPL
363364	2002 SC_{44}	—	September 29, 2002	Haleakala	NEAT	MAS	820 m	MPC · JPL
363365	2002 SD_{74}	—	September 16, 2002	Palomar	NEAT	MAS	800 m	MPC · JPL
363366	2002 TT_{12}	—	October 1, 2002	Anderson Mesa	LONEOS	·	1.1 km	MPC · JPL
363367	2002 TZ_{19}	—	October 2, 2002	Socorro	LINEAR	·	1.2 km	MPC · JPL
363368	2002 TJ_{52}	—	October 2, 2002	Socorro	LINEAR	·	1.3 km	MPC · JPL
363369	2002 TU_{53}	—	October 2, 2002	Socorro	LINEAR	·	1.7 km	MPC · JPL
363370	2002 TR_{137}	—	October 4, 2002	Anderson Mesa	LONEOS	THB	7.1 km	MPC · JPL
363371	2002 TM_{172}	—	October 4, 2002	Anderson Mesa	LONEOS	·	4.2 km	MPC · JPL
363372	2002 TN_{179}	—	October 13, 2002	Palomar	NEAT	·	2.0 km	MPC · JPL
363373	2002 TB_{194}	—	October 3, 2002	Socorro	LINEAR	·	1.5 km	MPC · JPL
363374	2002 TW_{278}	—	October 10, 2002	Socorro	LINEAR	·	2.7 km	MPC · JPL
363375	2002 TA_{308}	—	October 4, 2002	Apache Point	SDSS	·	1.4 km	MPC · JPL
363376	2002 TO_{311}	—	October 4, 2002	Apache Point	SDSS	·	1.4 km	MPC · JPL
363377	2002 TD_{350}	—	October 10, 2002	Apache Point	SDSS	EOS ·	2.6 km	MPC · JPL
363378	2002 TX_{368}	—	October 10, 2002	Apache Point	SDSS	·	1.6 km	MPC · JPL
363379	2002 TE_{372}	—	October 10, 2002	Apache Point	SDSS	·	2.0 km	MPC · JPL
363380	2002 TV_{375}	—	October 4, 2002	Palomar	NEAT	·	1.5 km	MPC · JPL
363381	2002 TT_{384}	—	October 4, 2002	Apache Point	SDSS	·	1.3 km	MPC · JPL
363382	2002 UG_{38}	—	October 31, 2002	Palomar	NEAT	·	1.5 km	MPC · JPL
363383	2002 VO_{13}	—	November 4, 2002	Kitt Peak	Spacewatch	·	1.6 km	MPC · JPL
363384	2002 VZ_{128}	—	November 5, 2002	Palomar	NEAT	·	1.4 km	MPC · JPL
363385	2002 WR_{10}	—	November 24, 2002	Palomar	NEAT	EUN	1.3 km	MPC · JPL
363386	2002 WG_{11}	—	October 30, 2002	Haleakala	NEAT	·	1.8 km	MPC · JPL
363387	2002 WO_{27}	—	November 24, 2002	Palomar	NEAT	EUN	1.4 km	MPC · JPL
363388	2002 XO_{30}	—	December 6, 2002	Socorro	LINEAR	T_{j} (2.99)	8.0 km	MPC · JPL
363389	2002 XH_{43}	—	December 10, 2002	Palomar	NEAT	·	1.2 km	MPC · JPL
363390	2002 XK_{52}	—	December 10, 2002	Socorro	LINEAR	·	2.1 km	MPC · JPL
363391	2002 XW_{56}	—	December 10, 2002	Socorro	LINEAR	·	2.5 km	MPC · JPL
363392	2002 XB_{88}	—	December 12, 2002	Palomar	NEAT	·	2.1 km	MPC · JPL
363393	2002 YY_{9}	—	December 31, 2002	Socorro	LINEAR	·	2.0 km	MPC · JPL
363394	2003 AA_{28}	—	January 4, 2003	Socorro	LINEAR	·	2.2 km	MPC · JPL
363395	2003 BC_{77}	—	January 30, 2003	Palomar	NEAT	(13314)	2.2 km	MPC · JPL
363396	2003 BE_{93}	—	January 29, 2003	Palomar	Palomar	·	760 m	MPC · JPL
363397	2003 HR_{50}	—	April 28, 2003	Socorro	LINEAR	·	4.4 km	MPC · JPL
363398	2003 JC_{3}	—	May 1, 2003	Kitt Peak	Spacewatch	·	2.1 km	MPC · JPL
363399	2003 JN_{3}	—	May 2, 2003	Kitt Peak	Spacewatch	·	830 m	MPC · JPL
363400	2003 KX_{13}	—	May 28, 2003	Kitt Peak	Spacewatch	H	450 m	MPC · JPL

== 363401–363500 ==
back to top

Designation			Discovery			Properties		Ref
Permanent	Provisional	Named after	Date	Site	Discoverer(s)	Category	Diam.	Ref
363401	2003 LB_{7}	—	June 1, 2003	Cerro Tololo	M. W. Buie	cubewano (cold)	155 km	MPC · JPL
363402	2003 MF_{3}	—	June 25, 2003	Socorro	LINEAR	·	2.6 km	MPC · JPL
363403	2003 OY_{7}	—	July 26, 2003	Pla D'Arguines	R. Ferrando	·	740 m	MPC · JPL
363404	2003 OX_{11}	—	July 21, 2003	Palomar	NEAT	H	680 m	MPC · JPL
363405	2003 OL_{13}	—	July 28, 2003	Reedy Creek	J. Broughton	·	4.7 km	MPC · JPL
363406	2003 OJ_{28}	—	July 24, 2003	Palomar	NEAT	·	720 m	MPC · JPL
363407	2003 QY_{1}	—	August 19, 2003	Campo Imperatore	CINEOS	·	640 m	MPC · JPL
363408	2003 QF_{20}	—	August 23, 2003	Socorro	LINEAR	·	1.2 km	MPC · JPL
363409	2003 QP_{23}	—	July 23, 2003	Palomar	NEAT	·	1.0 km	MPC · JPL
363410	2003 QW_{28}	—	August 22, 2003	Črni Vrh	Mikuž, H.	·	4.5 km	MPC · JPL
363411	2003 QR_{46}	—	August 24, 2003	Črni Vrh	Skvarč, J.	·	1.1 km	MPC · JPL
363412	2003 QX_{49}	—	August 22, 2003	Palomar	NEAT	·	4.0 km	MPC · JPL
363413	2003 QL_{58}	—	August 26, 2003	Socorro	LINEAR	·	1.3 km	MPC · JPL
363414	2003 QH_{59}	—	August 23, 2003	Socorro	LINEAR	NYS	1.5 km	MPC · JPL
363415	2003 QP_{66}	—	August 4, 2003	Kitt Peak	Spacewatch	NYS	1.1 km	MPC · JPL
363416	2003 QC_{99}	—	August 30, 2003	Socorro	LINEAR	·	4.2 km	MPC · JPL
363417	2003 QB_{101}	—	August 25, 2003	Socorro	LINEAR	URS	4.5 km	MPC · JPL
363418	2003 QH_{106}	—	August 31, 2003	Socorro	LINEAR	·	1.8 km	MPC · JPL
363419	2003 QV_{110}	—	August 31, 2003	Socorro	LINEAR	·	1.0 km	MPC · JPL
363420	2003 QZ_{112}	—	August 31, 2003	Socorro	LINEAR	T_{j} (2.97)	5.6 km	MPC · JPL
363421	2003 RG_{8}	—	September 6, 2003	Anderson Mesa	LONEOS	·	1.0 km	MPC · JPL
363422	2003 RP_{16}	—	September 15, 2003	Palomar	NEAT	·	4.4 km	MPC · JPL
363423	2003 RM_{21}	—	September 13, 2003	Haleakala	NEAT	·	1.4 km	MPC · JPL
363424	2003 RB_{23}	—	September 13, 2003	Anderson Mesa	LONEOS	·	2.8 km	MPC · JPL
363425	2003 RF_{24}	—	September 15, 2003	Anderson Mesa	LONEOS	HYG	3.7 km	MPC · JPL
363426	2003 SH_{14}	—	September 17, 2003	Kitt Peak	Spacewatch	·	730 m	MPC · JPL
363427	2003 SH_{23}	—	September 16, 2003	Haleakala	NEAT	·	3.9 km	MPC · JPL
363428	2003 SD_{30}	—	September 18, 2003	Palomar	NEAT	·	1.0 km	MPC · JPL
363429	2003 SR_{32}	—	September 17, 2003	Kitt Peak	Spacewatch	NYS	1.0 km	MPC · JPL
363430	2003 SU_{33}	—	September 18, 2003	Socorro	LINEAR	·	3.0 km	MPC · JPL
363431	2003 SZ_{33}	—	September 18, 2003	Socorro	LINEAR	·	3.2 km	MPC · JPL
363432	2003 SN_{59}	—	September 17, 2003	Anderson Mesa	LONEOS	·	4.4 km	MPC · JPL
363433	2003 SR_{63}	—	September 17, 2003	Kitt Peak	Spacewatch	·	1.1 km	MPC · JPL
363434	2003 SN_{71}	—	September 18, 2003	Kitt Peak	Spacewatch	·	1.7 km	MPC · JPL
363435	2003 SN_{83}	—	September 18, 2003	Kitt Peak	Spacewatch	·	830 m	MPC · JPL
363436	2003 SW_{86}	—	September 17, 2003	Socorro	LINEAR	·	910 m	MPC · JPL
363437	2003 SE_{95}	—	September 19, 2003	Socorro	LINEAR	·	1.3 km	MPC · JPL
363438	2003 SY_{105}	—	September 20, 2003	Haleakala	NEAT	·	1.0 km	MPC · JPL
363439	2003 SE_{112}	—	September 21, 2003	Junk Bond	D. Healy	LIX	4.4 km	MPC · JPL
363440	2003 SO_{114}	—	September 16, 2003	Kitt Peak	Spacewatch	·	3.4 km	MPC · JPL
363441	2003 SZ_{115}	—	September 16, 2003	Anderson Mesa	LONEOS	·	780 m	MPC · JPL
363442	2003 SD_{116}	—	September 16, 2003	Anderson Mesa	LONEOS	·	3.7 km	MPC · JPL
363443	2003 SS_{118}	—	September 16, 2003	Kitt Peak	Spacewatch	THM	2.4 km	MPC · JPL
363444	2003 SQ_{133}	—	September 21, 2003	Socorro	LINEAR	LIX	4.3 km	MPC · JPL
363445	2003 ST_{144}	—	September 19, 2003	Palomar	NEAT	·	4.1 km	MPC · JPL
363446	2003 SF_{149}	—	September 16, 2003	Kitt Peak	Spacewatch	·	940 m	MPC · JPL
363447	2003 SQ_{158}	—	September 23, 2003	Haleakala	NEAT	·	4.0 km	MPC · JPL
363448	2003 SE_{159}	—	September 20, 2003	Kitt Peak	Spacewatch	·	3.8 km	MPC · JPL
363449	2003 SY_{162}	—	September 19, 2003	Kitt Peak	Spacewatch	·	1.4 km	MPC · JPL
363450	2003 SO_{172}	—	September 18, 2003	Socorro	LINEAR	MAS	900 m	MPC · JPL
363451	2003 SR_{172}	—	September 18, 2003	Socorro	LINEAR	·	1.3 km	MPC · JPL
363452	2003 SS_{174}	—	September 18, 2003	Kitt Peak	Spacewatch	·	670 m	MPC · JPL
363453	2003 SK_{179}	—	September 19, 2003	Palomar	NEAT	·	1.5 km	MPC · JPL
363454	2003 SC_{180}	—	September 19, 2003	Kitt Peak	Spacewatch	·	1.6 km	MPC · JPL
363455	2003 SG_{190}	—	September 24, 2003	Haleakala	NEAT	LIX	4.2 km	MPC · JPL
363456	2003 SC_{192}	—	September 19, 2003	Palomar	NEAT	·	2.9 km	MPC · JPL
363457	2003 SB_{208}	—	September 26, 2003	Junk Bond	Junk Bond	·	700 m	MPC · JPL
363458	2003 SX_{216}	—	September 27, 2003	Desert Eagle	W. K. Y. Yeung	·	1.0 km	MPC · JPL
363459	2003 SZ_{227}	—	September 27, 2003	Socorro	LINEAR	·	1.2 km	MPC · JPL
363460	2003 SJ_{237}	—	September 26, 2003	Socorro	LINEAR	·	1.0 km	MPC · JPL
363461	2003 SN_{238}	—	September 27, 2003	Socorro	LINEAR	HYG	2.8 km	MPC · JPL
363462	2003 SE_{244}	—	September 29, 2003	Kitt Peak	Spacewatch	THM	2.6 km	MPC · JPL
363463	2003 SC_{257}	—	September 28, 2003	Kitt Peak	Spacewatch	·	2.8 km	MPC · JPL
363464	2003 SX_{260}	—	September 27, 2003	Socorro	LINEAR	·	3.2 km	MPC · JPL
363465	2003 SR_{261}	—	September 27, 2003	Socorro	LINEAR	T_{j} (2.92)	3.6 km	MPC · JPL
363466	2003 SH_{270}	—	September 24, 2003	Haleakala	NEAT	·	2.9 km	MPC · JPL
363467	2003 SC_{272}	—	August 5, 2003	Socorro	LINEAR	·	860 m	MPC · JPL
363468	2003 SE_{273}	—	September 27, 2003	Kitt Peak	Spacewatch	·	1.2 km	MPC · JPL
363469	2003 SG_{276}	—	September 29, 2003	Kitt Peak	Spacewatch	·	910 m	MPC · JPL
363470	2003 SJ_{276}	—	September 29, 2003	Kitt Peak	Spacewatch	NYS	880 m	MPC · JPL
363471	2003 SL_{283}	—	September 20, 2003	Socorro	LINEAR	·	3.2 km	MPC · JPL
363472	2003 SS_{283}	—	September 20, 2003	Socorro	LINEAR	·	4.8 km	MPC · JPL
363473	2003 SJ_{284}	—	September 20, 2003	Socorro	LINEAR	·	860 m	MPC · JPL
363474	2003 SK_{285}	—	September 20, 2003	Kitt Peak	Spacewatch	·	760 m	MPC · JPL
363475	2003 SS_{285}	—	September 20, 2003	Kitt Peak	Spacewatch	·	1.2 km	MPC · JPL
363476	2003 SK_{290}	—	September 28, 2003	Anderson Mesa	LONEOS	·	1.1 km	MPC · JPL
363477	2003 SR_{298}	—	September 20, 2003	Kitt Peak	Spacewatch	H	560 m	MPC · JPL
363478	2003 SU_{305}	—	September 30, 2003	Socorro	LINEAR	·	1.1 km	MPC · JPL
363479	2003 SS_{308}	—	September 29, 2003	Anderson Mesa	LONEOS	PHO	890 m	MPC · JPL
363480	2003 ST_{324}	—	September 17, 2003	Kitt Peak	Spacewatch	·	2.8 km	MPC · JPL
363481	2003 SE_{330}	—	September 26, 2003	Apache Point	SDSS	LIX	4.7 km	MPC · JPL
363482	2003 SE_{333}	—	September 27, 2003	Kitt Peak	Spacewatch	·	2.4 km	MPC · JPL
363483	2003 SB_{347}	—	September 18, 2003	Kitt Peak	Spacewatch	CLA	1.6 km	MPC · JPL
363484	2003 SF_{356}	—	September 18, 2003	Kitt Peak	Spacewatch	VER	4.3 km	MPC · JPL
363485	2003 SE_{359}	—	September 21, 2003	Kitt Peak	Spacewatch	·	2.8 km	MPC · JPL
363486	2003 SV_{393}	—	September 26, 2003	Apache Point	SDSS	·	1.4 km	MPC · JPL
363487	2003 SF_{394}	—	September 26, 2003	Apache Point	SDSS	·	1.1 km	MPC · JPL
363488	2003 SV_{400}	—	September 26, 2003	Apache Point	SDSS	·	3.3 km	MPC · JPL
363489	2003 SV_{428}	—	September 19, 2003	Kitt Peak	Spacewatch	·	3.4 km	MPC · JPL
363490	2003 SX_{431}	—	September 17, 2003	Kitt Peak	Spacewatch	·	2.9 km	MPC · JPL
363491	2003 TP	—	October 3, 2003	Kitt Peak	Spacewatch	·	740 m	MPC · JPL
363492	2003 TJ_{7}	—	October 1, 2003	Anderson Mesa	LONEOS	·	4.1 km	MPC · JPL
363493	2003 TQ_{11}	—	October 14, 2003	Anderson Mesa	LONEOS	·	1.1 km	MPC · JPL
363494	2003 TH_{12}	—	October 14, 2003	Anderson Mesa	LONEOS	·	1.8 km	MPC · JPL
363495	2003 TW_{26}	—	October 1, 2003	Kitt Peak	Spacewatch	·	3.6 km	MPC · JPL
363496	2003 TT_{39}	—	October 2, 2003	Kitt Peak	Spacewatch	·	2.5 km	MPC · JPL
363497	2003 TA_{46}	—	October 3, 2003	Kitt Peak	Spacewatch	CYB	3.9 km	MPC · JPL
363498	2003 TD_{51}	—	October 5, 2003	Kitt Peak	Spacewatch	·	3.9 km	MPC · JPL
363499	2003 TJ_{59}	—	October 15, 2003	Anderson Mesa	LONEOS	·	1.3 km	MPC · JPL
363500	2003 UH_{3}	—	October 17, 2003	Kitt Peak	Spacewatch	H	650 m	MPC · JPL

== 363501–363600 ==
back to top

Designation			Discovery			Properties		Ref
Permanent	Provisional	Named after	Date	Site	Discoverer(s)	Category	Diam.	Ref
363501	2003 UG_{10}	—	October 18, 2003	Palomar	NEAT	·	4.3 km	MPC · JPL
363502	2003 UG_{13}	—	October 21, 2003	Socorro	LINEAR	H	700 m	MPC · JPL
363503	2003 UT_{15}	—	October 16, 2003	Anderson Mesa	LONEOS	V	920 m	MPC · JPL
363504 Belleau	2003 UA_{18}	Belleau	October 18, 2003	Saint-Sulpice	Saint-Sulpice	V	660 m	MPC · JPL
363505	2003 UC_{20}	—	October 21, 2003	Socorro	LINEAR	ATE +1km · PHA	1.9 km	MPC · JPL
363506	2003 UJ_{37}	—	October 16, 2003	Črni Vrh	Mikuž, H.	·	6.7 km	MPC · JPL
363507	2003 UE_{47}	—	October 21, 2003	Goodricke-Pigott	R. A. Tucker	H	790 m	MPC · JPL
363508	2003 UX_{47}	—	October 16, 2003	Kitt Peak	Spacewatch	·	5.1 km	MPC · JPL
363509	2003 UF_{56}	—	October 19, 2003	Goodricke-Pigott	R. A. Tucker	·	2.4 km	MPC · JPL
363510	2003 UY_{63}	—	October 16, 2003	Anderson Mesa	LONEOS	·	1.4 km	MPC · JPL
363511	2003 UA_{64}	—	October 16, 2003	Anderson Mesa	LONEOS	THB	3.6 km	MPC · JPL
363512	2003 US_{80}	—	October 16, 2003	Kitt Peak	Spacewatch	LIX	3.7 km	MPC · JPL
363513	2003 UW_{100}	—	October 20, 2003	Palomar	NEAT	H	820 m	MPC · JPL
363514	2003 UJ_{106}	—	September 21, 2003	Campo Imperatore	CINEOS	·	1.0 km	MPC · JPL
363515	2003 UG_{119}	—	October 18, 2003	Palomar	NEAT	·	3.1 km	MPC · JPL
363516	2003 UG_{124}	—	October 20, 2003	Palomar	NEAT	·	3.8 km	MPC · JPL
363517	2003 UP_{136}	—	September 22, 2003	Kitt Peak	Spacewatch	·	1.2 km	MPC · JPL
363518	2003 UD_{140}	—	October 16, 2003	Anderson Mesa	LONEOS	·	1.4 km	MPC · JPL
363519	2003 UB_{152}	—	October 21, 2003	Socorro	LINEAR	·	1.3 km	MPC · JPL
363520	2003 UN_{170}	—	October 22, 2003	Kitt Peak	Spacewatch	MAS	870 m	MPC · JPL
363521	2003 UW_{178}	—	October 21, 2003	Palomar	NEAT	T_{j} (2.99) · EUP	3.2 km	MPC · JPL
363522	2003 UR_{187}	—	October 22, 2003	Socorro	LINEAR	·	1.5 km	MPC · JPL
363523	2003 UZ_{198}	—	October 21, 2003	Socorro	LINEAR	·	1.7 km	MPC · JPL
363524	2003 UO_{201}	—	October 21, 2003	Socorro	LINEAR	·	1.2 km	MPC · JPL
363525	2003 UK_{211}	—	October 23, 2003	Kitt Peak	Spacewatch	V	820 m	MPC · JPL
363526	2003 UN_{225}	—	October 22, 2003	Kitt Peak	Spacewatch	·	2.9 km	MPC · JPL
363527	2003 UV_{226}	—	October 23, 2003	Kitt Peak	Spacewatch	ERI	1.9 km	MPC · JPL
363528	2003 UK_{235}	—	October 24, 2003	Kitt Peak	Spacewatch	·	3.2 km	MPC · JPL
363529	2003 UJ_{240}	—	October 19, 2003	Kitt Peak	Spacewatch	·	1.4 km	MPC · JPL
363530	2003 UN_{260}	—	October 25, 2003	Kitt Peak	Spacewatch	·	1.3 km	MPC · JPL
363531	2003 UH_{262}	—	October 26, 2003	Haleakala	NEAT	·	1.2 km	MPC · JPL
363532	2003 US_{283}	—	October 30, 2003	Socorro	LINEAR	(895)	5.6 km	MPC · JPL
363533	2003 UR_{287}	—	October 21, 2003	Palomar	NEAT	NYS	1.2 km	MPC · JPL
363534	2003 UB_{290}	—	October 20, 2003	Palomar	NEAT	NYS	1.3 km	MPC · JPL
363535	2003 UJ_{303}	—	October 17, 2003	Kitt Peak	Spacewatch	EOS	2.0 km	MPC · JPL
363536	2003 UQ_{316}	—	October 27, 2003	Kitt Peak	Spacewatch	·	1.2 km	MPC · JPL
363537	2003 UB_{319}	—	October 20, 2003	Palomar	NEAT	·	1.6 km	MPC · JPL
363538	2003 UX_{327}	—	October 17, 2003	Apache Point	SDSS	·	2.3 km	MPC · JPL
363539	2003 UD_{328}	—	September 22, 2003	Kitt Peak	Spacewatch	V	500 m	MPC · JPL
363540	2003 UZ_{330}	—	September 20, 2003	Kitt Peak	Spacewatch	·	5.5 km	MPC · JPL
363541	2003 UG_{349}	—	October 19, 2003	Apache Point	SDSS	·	4.2 km	MPC · JPL
363542	2003 UF_{372}	—	October 22, 2003	Kitt Peak	Spacewatch	·	1.2 km	MPC · JPL
363543	2003 UF_{378}	—	October 22, 2003	Apache Point	SDSS	V	640 m	MPC · JPL
363544	2003 VH_{2}	—	November 4, 2003	Socorro	LINEAR	H	580 m	MPC · JPL
363545	2003 VX_{9}	—	November 14, 2003	Palomar	NEAT	H	760 m	MPC · JPL
363546	2003 WA_{4}	—	November 16, 2003	Catalina	CSS	V	870 m	MPC · JPL
363547	2003 WH_{11}	—	November 18, 2003	Palomar	NEAT	·	1.4 km	MPC · JPL
363548	2003 WA_{13}	—	November 19, 2003	Kitt Peak	Spacewatch	·	1.1 km	MPC · JPL
363549	2003 WV_{24}	—	November 20, 2003	Socorro	LINEAR	H	650 m	MPC · JPL
363550	2003 WR_{36}	—	November 19, 2003	Socorro	LINEAR	·	4.3 km	MPC · JPL
363551	2003 WV_{39}	—	November 19, 2003	Kitt Peak	Spacewatch	·	2.5 km	MPC · JPL
363552	2003 WX_{49}	—	November 19, 2003	Socorro	LINEAR	·	1.3 km	MPC · JPL
363553	2003 WW_{53}	—	November 20, 2003	Socorro	LINEAR	EOS	2.3 km	MPC · JPL
363554	2003 WT_{66}	—	November 19, 2003	Palomar	NEAT	·	4.3 km	MPC · JPL
363555	2003 WB_{105}	—	November 21, 2003	Kitt Peak	Spacewatch	CYB	4.7 km	MPC · JPL
363556	2003 WY_{105}	—	November 21, 2003	Socorro	LINEAR	·	1.4 km	MPC · JPL
363557	2003 WQ_{139}	—	November 21, 2003	Socorro	LINEAR	T_{j} (2.99)	4.4 km	MPC · JPL
363558	2003 WT_{145}	—	October 25, 2003	Socorro	LINEAR	H	520 m	MPC · JPL
363559	2003 WJ_{150}	—	November 24, 2003	Anderson Mesa	LONEOS	·	1.4 km	MPC · JPL
363560	2003 YC	—	December 16, 2003	Socorro	LINEAR	·	1.3 km	MPC · JPL
363561	2003 YC_{1}	—	December 17, 2003	Socorro	LINEAR	H	600 m	MPC · JPL
363562	2003 YQ_{12}	—	December 17, 2003	Anderson Mesa	LONEOS	fast	1.4 km	MPC · JPL
363563	2003 YW_{27}	—	November 19, 2003	Socorro	LINEAR	·	1.9 km	MPC · JPL
363564	2003 YD_{127}	—	December 27, 2003	Socorro	LINEAR	·	1.4 km	MPC · JPL
363565	2003 YD_{155}	—	December 30, 2003	Socorro	LINEAR	·	1.8 km	MPC · JPL
363566	2003 YD_{167}	—	December 17, 2003	Kitt Peak	Spacewatch	EUN	1.6 km	MPC · JPL
363567	2004 AH_{8}	—	January 13, 2004	Palomar	NEAT	·	3.1 km	MPC · JPL
363568	2004 AD_{9}	—	January 14, 2004	Palomar	NEAT	·	3.2 km	MPC · JPL
363569	2004 AO_{10}	—	January 13, 2004	Anderson Mesa	LONEOS	H	820 m	MPC · JPL
363570	2004 AM_{14}	—	January 14, 2004	Palomar	NEAT	·	2.9 km	MPC · JPL
363571	2004 AO_{21}	—	January 15, 2004	Kitt Peak	Spacewatch	·	1.1 km	MPC · JPL
363572	2004 BR_{6}	—	January 17, 2004	Haleakala	NEAT	·	4.6 km	MPC · JPL
363573	2004 BB_{9}	—	January 17, 2004	Palomar	NEAT	·	1.6 km	MPC · JPL
363574	2004 BV_{14}	—	January 16, 2004	Palomar	NEAT	·	2.0 km	MPC · JPL
363575	2004 BO_{28}	—	January 18, 2004	Palomar	NEAT	(5)	1.2 km	MPC · JPL
363576	2004 BC_{73}	—	January 24, 2004	Socorro	LINEAR	·	2.1 km	MPC · JPL
363577	2004 BB_{80}	—	January 24, 2004	Socorro	LINEAR	·	1.2 km	MPC · JPL
363578	2004 BA_{85}	—	January 27, 2004	Socorro	LINEAR	·	2.7 km	MPC · JPL
363579	2004 BF_{94}	—	January 28, 2004	Haleakala	NEAT	·	1.4 km	MPC · JPL
363580	2004 BE_{159}	—	January 20, 2004	Cerro Paranal	Cerro Paranal	·	1.3 km	MPC · JPL
363581	2004 CT_{1}	—	February 11, 2004	Desert Eagle	W. K. Y. Yeung	·	1.4 km	MPC · JPL
363582 Folpotat	2004 CJ_{3}	Folpotat	February 9, 2004	Vicques	M. Ory	·	1.5 km	MPC · JPL
363583	2004 CP_{11}	—	January 30, 2004	Kitt Peak	Spacewatch	·	1.4 km	MPC · JPL
363584	2004 CG_{36}	—	February 11, 2004	Palomar	NEAT	·	3.8 km	MPC · JPL
363585	2004 CB_{51}	—	February 11, 2004	Palomar	NEAT	BAR	1.3 km	MPC · JPL
363586	2004 CL_{64}	—	February 13, 2004	Kitt Peak	Spacewatch	·	1.5 km	MPC · JPL
363587	2004 CT_{69}	—	February 11, 2004	Palomar	NEAT	EUN	1.7 km	MPC · JPL
363588	2004 CH_{77}	—	February 11, 2004	Palomar	NEAT	·	1.5 km	MPC · JPL
363589	2004 CV_{98}	—	February 19, 2004	Haleakala	NEAT	JUN	1.1 km	MPC · JPL
363590	2004 CF_{104}	—	January 17, 2004	Haleakala	NEAT	·	1.9 km	MPC · JPL
363591	2004 DY_{9}	—	February 17, 2004	Kitt Peak	Spacewatch	·	2.1 km	MPC · JPL
363592	2004 DZ_{38}	—	February 14, 2004	Kitt Peak	Spacewatch	(5)	1.6 km	MPC · JPL
363593	2004 DP_{55}	—	February 22, 2004	Kitt Peak	Spacewatch	·	1.4 km	MPC · JPL
363594	2004 EZ_{7}	—	March 13, 2004	Palomar	NEAT	·	2.3 km	MPC · JPL
363595	2004 ES_{18}	—	March 14, 2004	Socorro	LINEAR	·	1.9 km	MPC · JPL
363596	2004 EN_{70}	—	March 15, 2004	Kitt Peak	Spacewatch	MIS	2.7 km	MPC · JPL
363597	2004 ED_{71}	—	March 15, 2004	Catalina	CSS	·	1.6 km	MPC · JPL
363598	2004 ET_{71}	—	March 15, 2004	Socorro	LINEAR	RAF	1.1 km	MPC · JPL
363599	2004 FG_{11}	—	March 23, 2004	Socorro	LINEAR	APO · PHA · moon	150 m	MPC · JPL
363600	2004 FQ_{61}	—	March 19, 2004	Socorro	LINEAR	JUN	960 m	MPC · JPL

== 363601–363700 ==
back to top

Designation			Discovery			Properties		Ref
Permanent	Provisional	Named after	Date	Site	Discoverer(s)	Category	Diam.	Ref
363601	2004 FP_{87}	—	March 19, 2004	Palomar	NEAT	EUN	1.4 km	MPC · JPL
363602	2004 FG_{114}	—	March 21, 2004	Kitt Peak	Spacewatch	·	1.7 km	MPC · JPL
363603	2004 FJ_{128}	—	March 27, 2004	Socorro	LINEAR	JUN	1.0 km	MPC · JPL
363604	2004 FG_{134}	—	March 26, 2004	Anderson Mesa	LONEOS	·	1.8 km	MPC · JPL
363605	2004 FZ_{134}	—	March 26, 2004	Catalina	CSS	·	1.8 km	MPC · JPL
363606	2004 FA_{137}	—	March 28, 2004	Socorro	LINEAR	·	2.0 km	MPC · JPL
363607	2004 FX_{146}	—	March 25, 2004	Anderson Mesa	LONEOS	·	2.1 km	MPC · JPL
363608	2004 FS_{148}	—	March 31, 2004	Socorro	LINEAR	EUN	1.6 km	MPC · JPL
363609	2004 GO_{11}	—	April 12, 2004	Socorro	LINEAR	·	3.9 km	MPC · JPL
363610	2004 HZ_{18}	—	April 19, 2004	Socorro	LINEAR	·	2.1 km	MPC · JPL
363611	2004 HU_{23}	—	April 16, 2004	Kitt Peak	Spacewatch	·	1.8 km	MPC · JPL
363612	2004 HN_{36}	—	April 21, 2004	Catalina	CSS	·	2.1 km	MPC · JPL
363613	2004 HL_{38}	—	April 23, 2004	Kitt Peak	Spacewatch	·	2.6 km	MPC · JPL
363614	2004 HJ_{48}	—	April 22, 2004	Hunters Hill	Hill, Hunters	JUN	1.1 km	MPC · JPL
363615	2004 HM_{71}	—	April 25, 2004	Kitt Peak	Spacewatch	·	2.1 km	MPC · JPL
363616	2004 JC_{4}	—	May 9, 2004	Kitt Peak	Spacewatch	AGN	1.2 km	MPC · JPL
363617	2004 KK_{17}	—	May 30, 2004	Socorro	LINEAR	APO	750 m	MPC · JPL
363618	2004 LX_{23}	—	June 13, 2004	Bergisch Gladbach	W. Bickel	·	1.7 km	MPC · JPL
363619	2004 OQ_{10}	—	July 22, 2004	Hormersdorf	Hormersdorf	TIN	1.3 km	MPC · JPL
363620	2004 PG_{5}	—	August 6, 2004	Palomar	NEAT	·	1.7 km	MPC · JPL
363621	2004 PZ_{77}	—	August 9, 2004	Socorro	LINEAR	·	3.0 km	MPC · JPL
363622	2004 PN_{91}	—	August 11, 2004	Socorro	LINEAR	·	2.9 km	MPC · JPL
363623 Chelčický	2004 PC_{105}	Chelčický	August 15, 2004	Kleť	KLENOT	·	2.6 km	MPC · JPL
363624	2004 QB_{29}	—	October 27, 2005	Mount Lemmon	Mount Lemmon Survey	·	2.4 km	MPC · JPL
363625	2004 RZ	—	September 5, 2004	Socorro	LINEAR	·	4.3 km	MPC · JPL
363626	2004 RA_{11}	—	September 8, 2004	Socorro	LINEAR	AMO	630 m	MPC · JPL
363627	2004 RK_{33}	—	September 7, 2004	Socorro	LINEAR	·	2.2 km	MPC · JPL
363628	2004 RU_{41}	—	September 7, 2004	Palomar	NEAT	·	2.0 km	MPC · JPL
363629	2004 RH_{104}	—	September 8, 2004	Palomar	NEAT	DOR	3.1 km	MPC · JPL
363630	2004 RO_{139}	—	September 8, 2004	Socorro	LINEAR	·	650 m	MPC · JPL
363631	2004 RB_{148}	—	September 9, 2004	Socorro	LINEAR	·	3.5 km	MPC · JPL
363632	2004 RQ_{151}	—	September 9, 2004	Kitt Peak	Spacewatch	EOS	1.4 km	MPC · JPL
363633	2004 RT_{165}	—	September 7, 2004	Socorro	LINEAR	·	2.8 km	MPC · JPL
363634	2004 RA_{168}	—	September 7, 2004	Palomar	NEAT	·	2.7 km	MPC · JPL
363635	2004 RX_{178}	—	September 10, 2004	Socorro	LINEAR	EOS	2.4 km	MPC · JPL
363636	2004 RJ_{184}	—	September 10, 2004	Socorro	LINEAR	·	810 m	MPC · JPL
363637	2004 RM_{185}	—	September 10, 2004	Socorro	LINEAR	·	2.1 km	MPC · JPL
363638	2004 RP_{189}	—	September 10, 2004	Socorro	LINEAR	·	3.3 km	MPC · JPL
363639	2004 RG_{192}	—	September 10, 2004	Socorro	LINEAR	·	3.6 km	MPC · JPL
363640	2004 RW_{199}	—	September 10, 2004	Socorro	LINEAR	·	4.8 km	MPC · JPL
363641	2004 RH_{203}	—	September 11, 2004	Kitt Peak	Spacewatch	·	2.2 km	MPC · JPL
363642	2004 RX_{209}	—	September 11, 2004	Socorro	LINEAR	·	3.1 km	MPC · JPL
363643	2004 RV_{213}	—	September 11, 2004	Socorro	LINEAR	·	1.9 km	MPC · JPL
363644	2004 RL_{216}	—	September 11, 2004	Socorro	LINEAR	·	2.5 km	MPC · JPL
363645	2004 RH_{228}	—	September 9, 2004	Kitt Peak	Spacewatch	·	2.5 km	MPC · JPL
363646	2004 RO_{228}	—	September 9, 2004	Kitt Peak	Spacewatch	EOS	2.2 km	MPC · JPL
363647	2004 RT_{244}	—	September 10, 2004	Kitt Peak	Spacewatch	·	3.1 km	MPC · JPL
363648	2004 RA_{251}	—	September 14, 2004	Socorro	LINEAR	·	4.4 km	MPC · JPL
363649	2004 RT_{253}	—	September 6, 2004	Palomar	NEAT	·	2.8 km	MPC · JPL
363650	2004 RE_{255}	—	September 6, 2004	Palomar	NEAT	·	2.3 km	MPC · JPL
363651	2004 RV_{316}	—	September 11, 2004	Socorro	LINEAR	·	2.7 km	MPC · JPL
363652	2004 RM_{321}	—	September 13, 2004	Socorro	LINEAR	·	750 m	MPC · JPL
363653	2004 RL_{325}	—	September 13, 2004	Socorro	LINEAR	·	5.2 km	MPC · JPL
363654	2004 RF_{336}	—	September 15, 2004	Kitt Peak	Spacewatch	EOS	1.9 km	MPC · JPL
363655	2004 RK_{339}	—	September 15, 2004	Kitt Peak	Spacewatch	·	1.3 km	MPC · JPL
363656	2004 RA_{345}	—	September 8, 2004	Socorro	LINEAR	·	830 m	MPC · JPL
363657	2004 SO_{24}	—	September 18, 2004	Socorro	LINEAR	·	3.8 km	MPC · JPL
363658	2004 SE_{48}	—	September 18, 2004	Socorro	LINEAR	·	4.4 km	MPC · JPL
363659	2004 SH_{48}	—	September 18, 2004	Socorro	LINEAR	·	3.4 km	MPC · JPL
363660	2004 SJ_{61}	—	September 17, 2004	Socorro	LINEAR	·	670 m	MPC · JPL
363661	2004 TL_{5}	—	October 5, 2004	Kitt Peak	Spacewatch	·	2.4 km	MPC · JPL
363662	2004 TP_{22}	—	October 4, 2004	Kitt Peak	Spacewatch	EOS	2.2 km	MPC · JPL
363663	2004 TC_{26}	—	October 4, 2004	Kitt Peak	Spacewatch	·	2.9 km	MPC · JPL
363664	2004 TD_{31}	—	October 4, 2004	Kitt Peak	Spacewatch	(31811)	3.6 km	MPC · JPL
363665	2004 TH_{47}	—	October 4, 2004	Kitt Peak	Spacewatch	·	820 m	MPC · JPL
363666	2004 TE_{48}	—	October 4, 2004	Kitt Peak	Spacewatch	EOS	2.1 km	MPC · JPL
363667	2004 TW_{53}	—	October 4, 2004	Kitt Peak	Spacewatch	·	3.6 km	MPC · JPL
363668	2004 TX_{55}	—	October 4, 2004	Kitt Peak	Spacewatch	·	3.4 km	MPC · JPL
363669	2004 TX_{59}	—	October 5, 2004	Kitt Peak	Spacewatch	·	1.8 km	MPC · JPL
363670	2004 TP_{62}	—	October 5, 2004	Kitt Peak	Spacewatch	VER	2.7 km	MPC · JPL
363671	2004 TK_{63}	—	October 5, 2004	Kitt Peak	Spacewatch	EMA	3.8 km	MPC · JPL
363672	2004 TG_{65}	—	October 5, 2004	Palomar	NEAT	·	2.2 km	MPC · JPL
363673	2004 TF_{66}	—	October 5, 2004	Anderson Mesa	LONEOS	·	760 m	MPC · JPL
363674	2004 TY_{73}	—	October 6, 2004	Kitt Peak	Spacewatch	·	920 m	MPC · JPL
363675	2004 TE_{80}	—	October 5, 2004	Kitt Peak	Spacewatch	·	3.0 km	MPC · JPL
363676	2004 TZ_{82}	—	October 5, 2004	Kitt Peak	Spacewatch	·	2.3 km	MPC · JPL
363677	2004 TN_{87}	—	October 5, 2004	Kitt Peak	Spacewatch	·	1.6 km	MPC · JPL
363678	2004 TT_{92}	—	October 5, 2004	Kitt Peak	Spacewatch	EOS	2.1 km	MPC · JPL
363679	2004 TE_{97}	—	October 5, 2004	Kitt Peak	Spacewatch	·	1.7 km	MPC · JPL
363680	2004 TQ_{108}	—	October 7, 2004	Socorro	LINEAR	·	830 m	MPC · JPL
363681	2004 TY_{110}	—	October 7, 2004	Socorro	LINEAR	·	900 m	MPC · JPL
363682	2004 TA_{113}	—	October 7, 2004	Palomar	NEAT	·	3.7 km	MPC · JPL
363683	2004 TQ_{121}	—	October 7, 2004	Anderson Mesa	LONEOS	·	3.4 km	MPC · JPL
363684	2004 TY_{124}	—	October 7, 2004	Socorro	LINEAR	·	720 m	MPC · JPL
363685	2004 TQ_{132}	—	October 7, 2004	Palomar	NEAT	EOS	2.5 km	MPC · JPL
363686	2004 TV_{132}	—	October 7, 2004	Palomar	NEAT	·	3.4 km	MPC · JPL
363687	2004 TC_{143}	—	October 4, 2004	Kitt Peak	Spacewatch	EOS	2.8 km	MPC · JPL
363688	2004 TD_{148}	—	October 6, 2004	Kitt Peak	Spacewatch	·	2.8 km	MPC · JPL
363689	2004 TY_{157}	—	October 6, 2004	Kitt Peak	Spacewatch	·	3.0 km	MPC · JPL
363690	2004 TU_{158}	—	October 6, 2004	Kitt Peak	Spacewatch	·	3.1 km	MPC · JPL
363691	2004 TM_{161}	—	October 6, 2004	Kitt Peak	Spacewatch	·	3.5 km	MPC · JPL
363692	2004 TK_{163}	—	October 6, 2004	Kitt Peak	Spacewatch	THM	2.8 km	MPC · JPL
363693	2004 TM_{203}	—	October 7, 2004	Kitt Peak	Spacewatch	·	890 m	MPC · JPL
363694	2004 TT_{207}	—	October 7, 2004	Kitt Peak	Spacewatch	·	3.1 km	MPC · JPL
363695	2004 TS_{208}	—	October 8, 2004	Kitt Peak	Spacewatch	·	2.7 km	MPC · JPL
363696	2004 TA_{215}	—	October 9, 2004	Kitt Peak	Spacewatch	EOS	2.4 km	MPC · JPL
363697	2004 TS_{238}	—	October 9, 2004	Kitt Peak	Spacewatch	·	2.5 km	MPC · JPL
363698	2004 TA_{257}	—	October 9, 2004	Kitt Peak	Spacewatch	·	3.8 km	MPC · JPL
363699	2004 TS_{272}	—	October 9, 2004	Kitt Peak	Spacewatch	·	3.3 km	MPC · JPL
363700	2004 TD_{278}	—	October 9, 2004	Kitt Peak	Spacewatch	·	860 m	MPC · JPL

== 363701–363800 ==
back to top

Designation			Discovery			Properties		Ref
Permanent	Provisional	Named after	Date	Site	Discoverer(s)	Category	Diam.	Ref
363701	2004 TE_{291}	—	October 10, 2004	Kitt Peak	Spacewatch	EOS	1.8 km	MPC · JPL
363702	2004 TY_{307}	—	October 10, 2004	Socorro	LINEAR	·	3.7 km	MPC · JPL
363703	2004 TE_{314}	—	October 11, 2004	Kitt Peak	Spacewatch	·	670 m	MPC · JPL
363704	2004 TG_{333}	—	October 9, 2004	Kitt Peak	Spacewatch	·	4.3 km	MPC · JPL
363705	2004 TT_{333}	—	October 9, 2004	Kitt Peak	Spacewatch	·	4.8 km	MPC · JPL
363706 Karazija	2004 TW_{345}	Karazija	October 14, 2004	Moletai	K. Černis, J. Zdanavičius	·	3.3 km	MPC · JPL
363707	2004 TC_{351}	—	October 10, 2004	Kitt Peak	Spacewatch	·	1.9 km	MPC · JPL
363708	2004 TD_{357}	—	October 14, 2004	Anderson Mesa	LONEOS	·	3.2 km	MPC · JPL
363709	2004 TE_{357}	—	October 4, 2004	Palomar	NEAT	·	4.0 km	MPC · JPL
363710	2004 TL_{360}	—	October 10, 2004	Socorro	LINEAR	·	1.0 km	MPC · JPL
363711	2004 UP_{5}	—	October 7, 2004	Palomar	NEAT	·	3.5 km	MPC · JPL
363712	2004 VO_{1}	—	November 4, 2004	Kitt Peak	Spacewatch	EUP	5.2 km	MPC · JPL
363713	2004 VC_{6}	—	November 3, 2004	Kitt Peak	Spacewatch	·	4.0 km	MPC · JPL
363714	2004 VT_{16}	—	November 4, 2004	Kitt Peak	Spacewatch	·	620 m	MPC · JPL
363715	2004 VY_{20}	—	November 4, 2004	Catalina	CSS	·	3.6 km	MPC · JPL
363716	2004 VL_{22}	—	November 4, 2004	Kitt Peak	Spacewatch	·	3.6 km	MPC · JPL
363717	2004 VK_{30}	—	November 3, 2004	Kitt Peak	Spacewatch	EMA	2.8 km	MPC · JPL
363718	2004 VT_{37}	—	November 4, 2004	Kitt Peak	Spacewatch	·	780 m	MPC · JPL
363719	2004 VW_{47}	—	November 4, 2004	Kitt Peak	Spacewatch	·	3.7 km	MPC · JPL
363720	2004 VV_{56}	—	November 4, 2004	Catalina	CSS	·	820 m	MPC · JPL
363721	2004 VF_{58}	—	November 9, 2004	Catalina	CSS	·	3.5 km	MPC · JPL
363722	2004 VY_{59}	—	November 9, 2004	Catalina	CSS	·	800 m	MPC · JPL
363723	2004 VY_{60}	—	November 11, 2004	Catalina	CSS	·	4.2 km	MPC · JPL
363724	2004 VP_{64}	—	November 7, 2004	Socorro	LINEAR	·	3.8 km	MPC · JPL
363725	2004 VC_{72}	—	October 15, 2004	Mount Lemmon	Mount Lemmon Survey	·	3.7 km	MPC · JPL
363726	2004 VM_{130}	—	November 10, 2004	Kitt Peak	Spacewatch	·	3.8 km	MPC · JPL
363727	2004 WS_{1}	—	November 17, 2004	Campo Imperatore	CINEOS	·	660 m	MPC · JPL
363728	2004 XC_{4}	—	December 4, 2004	Kleť	Kleť	·	960 m	MPC · JPL
363729	2004 XH_{17}	—	December 3, 2004	Kitt Peak	Spacewatch	EOS	2.9 km	MPC · JPL
363730	2004 XN_{19}	—	December 8, 2004	Socorro	LINEAR	·	1.1 km	MPC · JPL
363731	2004 XF_{39}	—	December 7, 2004	Socorro	LINEAR	·	3.2 km	MPC · JPL
363732	2004 XH_{47}	—	December 9, 2004	Kitt Peak	Spacewatch	·	1.2 km	MPC · JPL
363733	2004 XM_{49}	—	December 2, 2004	Kitt Peak	Spacewatch	·	1.3 km	MPC · JPL
363734	2004 XN_{50}	—	December 14, 2004	Socorro	LINEAR	APO · PHA	610 m	MPC · JPL
363735	2004 XC_{66}	—	December 2, 2004	Kitt Peak	Spacewatch	·	4.1 km	MPC · JPL
363736	2004 XH_{66}	—	December 3, 2004	Kitt Peak	Spacewatch	MAS	610 m	MPC · JPL
363737	2004 XR_{76}	—	November 7, 2004	Socorro	LINEAR	(1338) (FLO)	840 m	MPC · JPL
363738	2004 XT_{77}	—	December 10, 2004	Socorro	LINEAR	·	830 m	MPC · JPL
363739	2004 XF_{81}	—	December 10, 2004	Socorro	LINEAR	·	1.0 km	MPC · JPL
363740	2004 XG_{95}	—	December 11, 2004	Kitt Peak	Spacewatch	·	880 m	MPC · JPL
363741	2004 XA_{96}	—	December 11, 2004	Kitt Peak	Spacewatch	T_{j} (2.99)	5.5 km	MPC · JPL
363742	2004 XO_{97}	—	December 11, 2004	Kitt Peak	Spacewatch	·	1.1 km	MPC · JPL
363743	2004 XW_{121}	—	December 15, 2004	Socorro	LINEAR	·	1.1 km	MPC · JPL
363744	2004 XU_{126}	—	December 14, 2004	Kitt Peak	Spacewatch	·	1.0 km	MPC · JPL
363745	2004 XN_{169}	—	December 9, 2004	Kitt Peak	Spacewatch	·	780 m	MPC · JPL
363746	2004 YW	—	December 16, 2004	Catalina	CSS	T_{j} (2.88)	4.3 km	MPC · JPL
363747	2004 YR_{6}	—	December 18, 2004	Mount Lemmon	Mount Lemmon Survey	·	1.0 km	MPC · JPL
363748	2005 AF	—	January 3, 2005	Piszkéstető	K. Sárneczky	·	750 m	MPC · JPL
363749	2005 AS_{11}	—	December 11, 2004	Kitt Peak	Spacewatch	NYS	1.0 km	MPC · JPL
363750	2005 AC_{37}	—	January 13, 2005	Socorro	LINEAR	V	780 m	MPC · JPL
363751	2005 AZ_{37}	—	January 13, 2005	Kitt Peak	Spacewatch	·	1.1 km	MPC · JPL
363752	2005 AT_{61}	—	January 15, 2005	Kitt Peak	Spacewatch	·	1.2 km	MPC · JPL
363753	2005 AQ_{64}	—	January 13, 2005	Kitt Peak	Spacewatch	V	680 m	MPC · JPL
363754	2005 AW_{64}	—	January 13, 2005	Kitt Peak	Spacewatch	NYS	1.1 km	MPC · JPL
363755	2005 BZ_{12}	—	January 17, 2005	Socorro	LINEAR	·	1.6 km	MPC · JPL
363756	2005 BE_{25}	—	January 17, 2005	Socorro	LINEAR	·	1.5 km	MPC · JPL
363757	2005 CJ_{10}	—	February 1, 2005	Kitt Peak	Spacewatch	·	1.0 km	MPC · JPL
363758	2005 CO_{11}	—	February 1, 2005	Kitt Peak	Spacewatch	·	1.1 km	MPC · JPL
363759	2005 CP_{17}	—	February 2, 2005	Socorro	LINEAR	·	950 m	MPC · JPL
363760	2005 CN_{23}	—	February 2, 2005	Catalina	CSS	·	1.2 km	MPC · JPL
363761	2005 CF_{37}	—	February 6, 2005	Kleť	Kleť	NYS	1.5 km	MPC · JPL
363762	2005 CQ_{76}	—	February 4, 2005	Catalina	CSS	·	2.0 km	MPC · JPL
363763	2005 EF_{15}	—	March 3, 2005	Kitt Peak	Spacewatch	·	1.1 km	MPC · JPL
363764	2005 EA_{22}	—	March 3, 2005	Catalina	CSS	·	1.2 km	MPC · JPL
363765	2005 EP_{43}	—	March 3, 2005	Kitt Peak	Spacewatch	·	1.5 km	MPC · JPL
363766	2005 ED_{78}	—	March 3, 2005	Catalina	CSS	·	1.5 km	MPC · JPL
363767	2005 EZ_{85}	—	March 4, 2005	Socorro	LINEAR	·	1.6 km	MPC · JPL
363768	2005 EW_{122}	—	March 8, 2005	Mount Lemmon	Mount Lemmon Survey	·	1.2 km	MPC · JPL
363769	2005 EZ_{123}	—	March 8, 2005	Anderson Mesa	LONEOS	MAS	930 m	MPC · JPL
363770	2005 EJ_{141}	—	March 10, 2005	Mount Lemmon	Mount Lemmon Survey	MAS	850 m	MPC · JPL
363771	2005 EX_{143}	—	March 10, 2005	Mount Lemmon	Mount Lemmon Survey	·	1.0 km	MPC · JPL
363772	2005 EE_{146}	—	March 10, 2005	Mount Lemmon	Mount Lemmon Survey	·	1.5 km	MPC · JPL
363773	2005 EY_{167}	—	March 11, 2005	Mount Lemmon	Mount Lemmon Survey	·	1.5 km	MPC · JPL
363774	2005 EK_{174}	—	March 8, 2005	Kitt Peak	Spacewatch	·	2.7 km	MPC · JPL
363775	2005 ER_{205}	—	March 13, 2005	Kitt Peak	Spacewatch	NYS	1.2 km	MPC · JPL
363776	2005 EO_{249}	—	March 13, 2005	Mount Lemmon	Mount Lemmon Survey	·	1.1 km	MPC · JPL
363777	2005 EB_{290}	—	March 9, 2005	Kitt Peak	Spacewatch	·	2.3 km	MPC · JPL
363778	2005 ER_{306}	—	March 8, 2005	Mount Lemmon	Mount Lemmon Survey	·	1.0 km	MPC · JPL
363779	2005 GF_{31}	—	April 4, 2005	Catalina	CSS	·	2.4 km	MPC · JPL
363780	2005 GE_{67}	—	April 2, 2005	Mount Lemmon	Mount Lemmon Survey	NYS	1.1 km	MPC · JPL
363781	2005 GW_{87}	—	April 4, 2005	Mount Lemmon	Mount Lemmon Survey	BAR	1.3 km	MPC · JPL
363782	2005 GO_{88}	—	April 5, 2005	Mount Lemmon	Mount Lemmon Survey	·	1.5 km	MPC · JPL
363783	2005 GU_{107}	—	April 10, 2005	Mount Lemmon	Mount Lemmon Survey	·	1.0 km	MPC · JPL
363784	2005 GN_{131}	—	April 10, 2005	Kitt Peak	Spacewatch	MAS	750 m	MPC · JPL
363785	2005 GK_{191}	—	April 12, 2005	Kitt Peak	M. W. Buie	·	840 m	MPC · JPL
363786	2005 HR_{9}	—	April 30, 2005	Kitt Peak	Spacewatch	·	1.1 km	MPC · JPL
363787	2005 JP_{5}	—	May 6, 2005	Socorro	LINEAR	H	820 m	MPC · JPL
363788	2005 JA_{19}	—	May 4, 2005	Mount Lemmon	Mount Lemmon Survey	·	1.1 km	MPC · JPL
363789	2005 JO_{29}	—	May 3, 2005	Catalina	CSS	H	710 m	MPC · JPL
363790	2005 JE_{46}	—	May 10, 2005	Socorro	LINEAR	APO +1km · PHA	960 m	MPC · JPL
363791	2005 JP_{74}	—	May 8, 2005	Mount Lemmon	Mount Lemmon Survey	·	1.0 km	MPC · JPL
363792	2005 JN_{121}	—	May 10, 2005	Kitt Peak	Spacewatch	·	370 m	MPC · JPL
363793	2005 JL_{130}	—	May 3, 2005	Kitt Peak	Spacewatch	·	1.9 km	MPC · JPL
363794	2005 JV_{132}	—	May 14, 2005	Kitt Peak	Spacewatch	·	1.0 km	MPC · JPL
363795	2005 JC_{135}	—	May 14, 2005	Mount Lemmon	Mount Lemmon Survey	NYS	1.3 km	MPC · JPL
363796	2005 JD_{146}	—	May 13, 2005	Kitt Peak	Spacewatch	·	1.9 km	MPC · JPL
363797	2005 KN_{3}	—	May 17, 2005	Mount Lemmon	Mount Lemmon Survey	·	1.1 km	MPC · JPL
363798	2005 KO_{4}	—	May 17, 2005	Mount Lemmon	Mount Lemmon Survey	·	1.1 km	MPC · JPL
363799	2005 LX_{10}	—	June 3, 2005	Kitt Peak	Spacewatch	·	1.9 km	MPC · JPL
363800	2005 LC_{12}	—	June 3, 2005	Kitt Peak	Spacewatch	·	1.8 km	MPC · JPL

== 363801–363900 ==
back to top

Designation			Discovery			Properties		Ref
Permanent	Provisional	Named after	Date	Site	Discoverer(s)	Category	Diam.	Ref
363801	2005 LE_{12}	—	June 4, 2005	Kitt Peak	Spacewatch	EUN	990 m	MPC · JPL
363802	2005 LT_{12}	—	June 7, 2005	Socorro	LINEAR	·	770 m	MPC · JPL
363803	2005 LG_{13}	—	June 4, 2005	Kitt Peak	Spacewatch	·	1.1 km	MPC · JPL
363804	2005 LO_{15}	—	June 4, 2005	Kitt Peak	Spacewatch	·	1.2 km	MPC · JPL
363805	2005 LD_{18}	—	June 6, 2005	Kitt Peak	Spacewatch	·	1.4 km	MPC · JPL
363806	2005 LK_{19}	—	June 8, 2005	Kitt Peak	Spacewatch	·	1.3 km	MPC · JPL
363807	2005 LH_{22}	—	June 8, 2005	Kitt Peak	Spacewatch	·	1.3 km	MPC · JPL
363808	2005 LC_{37}	—	June 5, 2005	Kitt Peak	Spacewatch	·	1.6 km	MPC · JPL
363809	2005 MG_{17}	—	June 27, 2005	Kitt Peak	Spacewatch	·	1.6 km	MPC · JPL
363810	2005 MN_{29}	—	June 29, 2005	Kitt Peak	Spacewatch	·	1.9 km	MPC · JPL
363811	2005 MN_{30}	—	June 29, 2005	Kitt Peak	Spacewatch	·	1.6 km	MPC · JPL
363812	2005 MY_{54}	—	June 29, 2005	Palomar	NEAT	·	1.6 km	MPC · JPL
363813	2005 NC_{3}	—	July 1, 2005	Palomar	NEAT	·	1.7 km	MPC · JPL
363814	2005 ND_{7}	—	July 5, 2005	Haleakala	NEAT	AMO · APO +1km	1.1 km	MPC · JPL
363815	2005 NY_{28}	—	July 6, 2005	Kitt Peak	Spacewatch	HNS	1.5 km	MPC · JPL
363816	2005 NY_{38}	—	July 8, 2005	Kitt Peak	Spacewatch	·	1.3 km	MPC · JPL
363817	2005 NZ_{38}	—	July 8, 2005	Catalina	CSS	JUN	1.6 km	MPC · JPL
363818	2005 NA_{43}	—	July 5, 2005	Palomar	NEAT	(5)	1.3 km	MPC · JPL
363819	2005 NF_{50}	—	September 24, 2000	Anderson Mesa	LONEOS	·	3.7 km	MPC · JPL
363820	2005 NT_{50}	—	July 5, 2005	Palomar	NEAT	·	2.0 km	MPC · JPL
363821	2005 NG_{53}	—	June 29, 2005	Kitt Peak	Spacewatch	(5)	1.2 km	MPC · JPL
363822	2005 NG_{68}	—	July 3, 2005	Mount Lemmon	Mount Lemmon Survey	·	1.6 km	MPC · JPL
363823	2005 ND_{84}	—	July 1, 2005	Kitt Peak	Spacewatch	·	1.5 km	MPC · JPL
363824	2005 NB_{95}	—	July 6, 2005	Kitt Peak	Spacewatch	·	1.7 km	MPC · JPL
363825	2005 NJ_{125}	—	July 10, 2005	Catalina	CSS	·	2.0 km	MPC · JPL
363826	2005 ON_{7}	—	July 29, 2005	Palomar	NEAT	slow	2.1 km	MPC · JPL
363827	2005 OU_{27}	—	July 28, 2005	Palomar	NEAT	·	680 m	MPC · JPL
363828	2005 OV_{27}	—	July 28, 2005	Palomar	NEAT	·	1.8 km	MPC · JPL
363829	2005 PQ_{6}	—	August 10, 2005	Siding Spring	SSS	·	2.2 km	MPC · JPL
363830	2005 PY_{13}	—	August 4, 2005	Palomar	NEAT	·	2.2 km	MPC · JPL
363831	2005 PY_{16}	—	August 1, 2005	Mauna Kea	D. J. Tholen	APO · PHA	370 m	MPC · JPL
363832	2005 PD_{20}	—	August 6, 2005	Palomar	NEAT	MIS	2.8 km	MPC · JPL
363833	2005 PA_{24}	—	August 8, 2005	Siding Spring	SSS	·	2.1 km	MPC · JPL
363834	2005 PH_{25}	—	August 5, 2005	Mauna Kea	P. A. Wiegert	·	1.5 km	MPC · JPL
363835	2005 QF_{1}	—	August 22, 2005	Palomar	NEAT	EUN	1.5 km	MPC · JPL
363836	2005 QR_{4}	—	August 24, 2005	Palomar	NEAT	MIS	2.6 km	MPC · JPL
363837	2005 QN_{10}	—	August 25, 2005	Campo Imperatore	CINEOS	·	2.0 km	MPC · JPL
363838	2005 QP_{14}	—	August 25, 2005	Palomar	NEAT	·	1.0 km	MPC · JPL
363839	2005 QZ_{14}	—	August 25, 2005	Palomar	NEAT	·	2.5 km	MPC · JPL
363840	2005 QH_{20}	—	July 30, 2005	Palomar	NEAT	·	2.1 km	MPC · JPL
363841	2005 QP_{20}	—	August 26, 2005	Anderson Mesa	LONEOS	·	1.7 km	MPC · JPL
363842	2005 QM_{38}	—	August 25, 2005	Campo Imperatore	CINEOS	·	1.4 km	MPC · JPL
363843	2005 QC_{54}	—	August 28, 2005	Kitt Peak	Spacewatch	·	2.2 km	MPC · JPL
363844	2005 QG_{65}	—	August 26, 2005	Palomar	NEAT	·	1.8 km	MPC · JPL
363845	2005 QN_{66}	—	August 27, 2005	Haleakala	NEAT	JUN	1.3 km	MPC · JPL
363846	2005 QT_{68}	—	August 28, 2005	Siding Spring	SSS	EUN	1.6 km	MPC · JPL
363847	2005 QN_{83}	—	August 29, 2005	Kitt Peak	Spacewatch	·	3.9 km	MPC · JPL
363848	2005 QE_{89}	—	August 29, 2005	Bergisch Gladbach	W. Bickel	EUN	1.7 km	MPC · JPL
363849	2005 QJ_{93}	—	August 26, 2005	Palomar	NEAT	·	1.9 km	MPC · JPL
363850	2005 QJ_{115}	—	August 27, 2005	Palomar	NEAT	·	1.8 km	MPC · JPL
363851	2005 QW_{121}	—	August 28, 2005	Kitt Peak	Spacewatch	HOF	2.5 km	MPC · JPL
363852	2005 QX_{124}	—	August 28, 2005	Kitt Peak	Spacewatch	·	1.9 km	MPC · JPL
363853	2005 QX_{127}	—	August 28, 2005	Kitt Peak	Spacewatch	AGN	1.3 km	MPC · JPL
363854	2005 QZ_{140}	—	August 29, 2005	Kitt Peak	Spacewatch	·	2.3 km	MPC · JPL
363855	2005 QN_{141}	—	August 30, 2005	Anderson Mesa	LONEOS	·	2.1 km	MPC · JPL
363856	2005 QF_{146}	—	August 28, 2005	Anderson Mesa	LONEOS	·	1.7 km	MPC · JPL
363857	2005 QG_{149}	—	August 26, 2005	Palomar	NEAT	·	1.5 km	MPC · JPL
363858	2005 RD_{3}	—	September 5, 2005	Catalina	CSS	·	2.0 km	MPC · JPL
363859	2005 RK_{12}	—	September 1, 2005	Kitt Peak	Spacewatch	·	1.5 km	MPC · JPL
363860	2005 RB_{20}	—	September 1, 2005	Kitt Peak	Spacewatch	·	1.7 km	MPC · JPL
363861	2005 RQ_{20}	—	September 1, 2005	Kitt Peak	Spacewatch	·	1.8 km	MPC · JPL
363862	2005 RF_{23}	—	September 9, 2005	Socorro	LINEAR	·	2.0 km	MPC · JPL
363863	2005 RW_{23}	—	September 10, 2005	Anderson Mesa	LONEOS	·	2.6 km	MPC · JPL
363864	2005 RT_{24}	—	September 11, 2005	Socorro	LINEAR	·	1.9 km	MPC · JPL
363865	2005 RL_{32}	—	September 13, 2005	Catalina	CSS	·	2.8 km	MPC · JPL
363866	2005 RD_{48}	—	September 14, 2005	Apache Point	A. C. Becker	·	2.0 km	MPC · JPL
363867	2005 RO_{51}	—	September 12, 2005	Kitt Peak	Spacewatch	·	2.8 km	MPC · JPL
363868	2005 RB_{52}	—	September 1, 2005	Palomar	NEAT	·	4.7 km	MPC · JPL
363869	2005 SK_{17}	—	September 26, 2005	Kitt Peak	Spacewatch	VER	3.3 km	MPC · JPL
363870	2005 SE_{25}	—	September 25, 2005	Palomar	NEAT	·	2.2 km	MPC · JPL
363871	2005 SO_{27}	—	September 23, 2005	Kitt Peak	Spacewatch	MRX	1.2 km	MPC · JPL
363872	2005 SU_{29}	—	September 23, 2005	Kitt Peak	Spacewatch	·	2.0 km	MPC · JPL
363873	2005 SG_{37}	—	September 24, 2005	Kitt Peak	Spacewatch	·	1.8 km	MPC · JPL
363874	2005 SG_{39}	—	September 24, 2005	Kitt Peak	Spacewatch	·	1.9 km	MPC · JPL
363875	2005 SF_{44}	—	September 24, 2005	Kitt Peak	Spacewatch	·	1.8 km	MPC · JPL
363876	2005 SA_{49}	—	September 24, 2005	Kitt Peak	Spacewatch	·	1.9 km	MPC · JPL
363877	2005 SR_{49}	—	September 24, 2005	Kitt Peak	Spacewatch	·	2.2 km	MPC · JPL
363878	2005 SK_{57}	—	September 26, 2005	Kitt Peak	Spacewatch	AEO	1.1 km	MPC · JPL
363879	2005 SS_{58}	—	September 26, 2005	Kitt Peak	Spacewatch	·	2.3 km	MPC · JPL
363880	2005 SM_{64}	—	September 26, 2005	Kitt Peak	Spacewatch	·	2.5 km	MPC · JPL
363881	2005 SB_{65}	—	September 26, 2005	Palomar	NEAT	·	1.8 km	MPC · JPL
363882	2005 SJ_{65}	—	September 26, 2005	Palomar	NEAT	·	730 m	MPC · JPL
363883	2005 SK_{65}	—	September 26, 2005	Palomar	NEAT	GEF	1.3 km	MPC · JPL
363884	2005 SY_{78}	—	September 24, 2005	Kitt Peak	Spacewatch	·	1.7 km	MPC · JPL
363885	2005 SG_{79}	—	September 24, 2005	Kitt Peak	Spacewatch	JUN	880 m	MPC · JPL
363886	2005 SR_{90}	—	September 24, 2005	Kitt Peak	Spacewatch	·	1.8 km	MPC · JPL
363887	2005 SX_{92}	—	September 24, 2005	Kitt Peak	Spacewatch	GEF	1.5 km	MPC · JPL
363888	2005 SF_{99}	—	September 25, 2005	Kitt Peak	Spacewatch	MRX	1.1 km	MPC · JPL
363889	2005 SE_{103}	—	September 25, 2005	Palomar	NEAT	JUN	950 m	MPC · JPL
363890	2005 SU_{106}	—	September 26, 2005	Palomar	NEAT	·	2.3 km	MPC · JPL
363891	2005 SB_{107}	—	September 1, 2005	Anderson Mesa	LONEOS	·	2.7 km	MPC · JPL
363892	2005 SQ_{108}	—	September 26, 2005	Kitt Peak	Spacewatch	EUN	1.1 km	MPC · JPL
363893	2005 SN_{110}	—	September 26, 2005	Kitt Peak	Spacewatch	KOR	1.4 km	MPC · JPL
363894	2005 SK_{119}	—	September 28, 2005	Palomar	NEAT	·	2.3 km	MPC · JPL
363895	2005 SN_{138}	—	September 25, 2005	Kitt Peak	Spacewatch	HOF	2.5 km	MPC · JPL
363896	2005 SD_{150}	—	February 13, 2002	Kitt Peak	Spacewatch	·	1.8 km	MPC · JPL
363897	2005 SJ_{151}	—	September 25, 2005	Kitt Peak	Spacewatch	KOR	1.2 km	MPC · JPL
363898	2005 ST_{151}	—	September 25, 2005	Kitt Peak	Spacewatch	AGN	1.2 km	MPC · JPL
363899	2005 SS_{158}	—	September 26, 2005	Palomar	NEAT	·	2.0 km	MPC · JPL
363900	2005 SM_{167}	—	September 28, 2005	Palomar	NEAT	·	2.0 km	MPC · JPL

== 363901–364000 ==
back to top

Designation			Discovery			Properties		Ref
Permanent	Provisional	Named after	Date	Site	Discoverer(s)	Category	Diam.	Ref
363901	2005 SW_{169}	—	September 29, 2005	Kitt Peak	Spacewatch	·	1.8 km	MPC · JPL
363902	2005 ST_{176}	—	September 29, 2005	Kitt Peak	Spacewatch	·	2.2 km	MPC · JPL
363903	2005 SG_{179}	—	September 29, 2005	Anderson Mesa	LONEOS	GEF	1.2 km	MPC · JPL
363904	2005 SH_{182}	—	September 29, 2005	Kitt Peak	Spacewatch	AGN	1.3 km	MPC · JPL
363905	2005 SW_{186}	—	September 29, 2005	Mount Lemmon	Mount Lemmon Survey	KOR	1.3 km	MPC · JPL
363906	2005 SF_{187}	—	September 29, 2005	Kitt Peak	Spacewatch	·	1.3 km	MPC · JPL
363907	2005 ST_{189}	—	September 29, 2005	Mount Lemmon	Mount Lemmon Survey	·	1.5 km	MPC · JPL
363908	2005 SV_{199}	—	September 30, 2005	Mount Lemmon	Mount Lemmon Survey	·	1.6 km	MPC · JPL
363909	2005 SZ_{207}	—	September 30, 2005	Kitt Peak	Spacewatch	·	3.8 km	MPC · JPL
363910	2005 SQ_{209}	—	September 30, 2005	Palomar	NEAT	·	2.8 km	MPC · JPL
363911	2005 SX_{213}	—	September 25, 2005	Catalina	CSS	·	3.3 km	MPC · JPL
363912	2005 SM_{217}	—	September 30, 2005	Palomar	NEAT	·	2.4 km	MPC · JPL
363913	2005 SA_{219}	—	September 30, 2005	Mount Lemmon	Mount Lemmon Survey	·	3.8 km	MPC · JPL
363914	2005 SB_{220}	—	September 29, 2005	Mount Lemmon	Mount Lemmon Survey	·	1.5 km	MPC · JPL
363915	2005 SE_{221}	—	September 29, 2005	Kitt Peak	Spacewatch	·	1.7 km	MPC · JPL
363916	2005 SF_{231}	—	September 30, 2005	Socorro	LINEAR	·	2.3 km	MPC · JPL
363917	2005 SN_{233}	—	September 30, 2005	Mount Lemmon	Mount Lemmon Survey	·	2.8 km	MPC · JPL
363918	2005 SY_{233}	—	September 30, 2005	Mount Lemmon	Mount Lemmon Survey	·	2.1 km	MPC · JPL
363919	2005 SQ_{236}	—	September 29, 2005	Kitt Peak	Spacewatch	·	2.2 km	MPC · JPL
363920	2005 SS_{244}	—	September 30, 2005	Mount Lemmon	Mount Lemmon Survey	·	2.1 km	MPC · JPL
363921	2005 SV_{254}	—	September 22, 2005	Palomar	NEAT	·	2.2 km	MPC · JPL
363922	2005 SZ_{265}	—	September 29, 2005	Kitt Peak	Spacewatch	·	2.5 km	MPC · JPL
363923	2005 SO_{268}	—	September 24, 2005	Palomar	NEAT	·	2.2 km	MPC · JPL
363924	2005 SP_{269}	—	September 28, 2005	Palomar	NEAT	·	2.1 km	MPC · JPL
363925	2005 SF_{274}	—	September 29, 2005	Kitt Peak	Spacewatch	EOS	2.0 km	MPC · JPL
363926	2005 ST_{287}	—	September 26, 2005	Apache Point	A. C. Becker	·	1.9 km	MPC · JPL
363927	2005 SW_{287}	—	September 26, 2005	Apache Point	A. C. Becker	·	2.8 km	MPC · JPL
363928	2005 TW_{4}	—	October 1, 2005	Mount Lemmon	Mount Lemmon Survey	·	1.5 km	MPC · JPL
363929	2005 TF_{6}	—	October 1, 2005	Catalina	CSS	·	1.9 km	MPC · JPL
363930	2005 TG_{8}	—	October 1, 2005	Kitt Peak	Spacewatch	AGN	1.2 km	MPC · JPL
363931	2005 TR_{49}	—	October 6, 2005	Mount Lemmon	Mount Lemmon Survey	NEM	2.7 km	MPC · JPL
363932	2005 TT_{53}	—	October 1, 2005	Socorro	LINEAR	·	2.7 km	MPC · JPL
363933	2005 TR_{54}	—	October 1, 2005	Mount Lemmon	Mount Lemmon Survey	·	3.5 km	MPC · JPL
363934	2005 TM_{64}	—	October 6, 2005	Mount Lemmon	Mount Lemmon Survey	·	1.5 km	MPC · JPL
363935	2005 TQ_{81}	—	October 3, 2005	Kitt Peak	Spacewatch	·	2.1 km	MPC · JPL
363936	2005 TE_{83}	—	October 3, 2005	Socorro	LINEAR	·	2.9 km	MPC · JPL
363937	2005 TR_{87}	—	October 5, 2005	Kitt Peak	Spacewatch	HOF	2.3 km	MPC · JPL
363938	2005 TV_{97}	—	October 6, 2005	Mount Lemmon	Mount Lemmon Survey	·	2.2 km	MPC · JPL
363939	2005 TD_{106}	—	October 9, 2005	Kitt Peak	Spacewatch	DOR	2.3 km	MPC · JPL
363940	2005 TA_{112}	—	October 7, 2005	Kitt Peak	Spacewatch	HOF	2.4 km	MPC · JPL
363941	2005 TC_{112}	—	September 27, 2005	Kitt Peak	Spacewatch	·	1.8 km	MPC · JPL
363942	2005 TG_{119}	—	October 7, 2005	Kitt Peak	Spacewatch	·	2.2 km	MPC · JPL
363943	2005 TC_{123}	—	October 7, 2005	Kitt Peak	Spacewatch	AGN	1.1 km	MPC · JPL
363944	2005 TZ_{126}	—	October 7, 2005	Kitt Peak	Spacewatch	KOR	1.2 km	MPC · JPL
363945	2005 TG_{142}	—	September 29, 2005	Kitt Peak	Spacewatch	·	1.8 km	MPC · JPL
363946	2005 TM_{156}	—	September 29, 2005	Kitt Peak	Spacewatch	MRX	1.1 km	MPC · JPL
363947	2005 TE_{159}	—	October 9, 2005	Kitt Peak	Spacewatch	·	1.9 km	MPC · JPL
363948	2005 TU_{172}	—	October 13, 2005	Socorro	LINEAR	DOR	3.5 km	MPC · JPL
363949	2005 TA_{192}	—	October 5, 2005	Kitt Peak	Spacewatch	·	3.5 km	MPC · JPL
363950	2005 TP_{196}	—	October 8, 2005	Catalina	CSS	JUN	1.1 km	MPC · JPL
363951	2005 UB_{3}	—	October 13, 2005	Socorro	LINEAR	BRA	1.9 km	MPC · JPL
363952	2005 UE_{8}	—	October 27, 2005	Ottmarsheim	C. Rinner	·	2.8 km	MPC · JPL
363953	2005 UY_{21}	—	October 23, 2005	Kitt Peak	Spacewatch	·	2.2 km	MPC · JPL
363954	2005 UX_{22}	—	October 23, 2005	Kitt Peak	Spacewatch	·	2.2 km	MPC · JPL
363955	2005 UG_{24}	—	October 23, 2005	Kitt Peak	Spacewatch	·	2.2 km	MPC · JPL
363956	2005 UR_{25}	—	October 23, 2005	Kitt Peak	Spacewatch	·	1.4 km	MPC · JPL
363957	2005 UU_{32}	—	October 24, 2005	Kitt Peak	Spacewatch	·	2.1 km	MPC · JPL
363958	2005 UP_{48}	—	October 22, 2005	Kitt Peak	Spacewatch	·	2.2 km	MPC · JPL
363959	2005 UJ_{56}	—	September 26, 2005	Kitt Peak	Spacewatch	·	3.6 km	MPC · JPL
363960	2005 UT_{58}	—	October 24, 2005	Kitt Peak	Spacewatch	·	2.1 km	MPC · JPL
363961	2005 UW_{86}	—	September 29, 2005	Mount Lemmon	Mount Lemmon Survey	GEF	1.1 km	MPC · JPL
363962	2005 UL_{89}	—	October 22, 2005	Kitt Peak	Spacewatch	EOS	1.8 km	MPC · JPL
363963	2005 UP_{91}	—	October 22, 2005	Kitt Peak	Spacewatch	·	2.8 km	MPC · JPL
363964	2005 UJ_{98}	—	October 22, 2005	Kitt Peak	Spacewatch	·	2.9 km	MPC · JPL
363965	2005 UN_{111}	—	October 22, 2005	Kitt Peak	Spacewatch	MRX	1.3 km	MPC · JPL
363966	2005 UB_{118}	—	October 24, 2005	Kitt Peak	Spacewatch	·	2.2 km	MPC · JPL
363967	2005 US_{120}	—	October 24, 2005	Anderson Mesa	LONEOS	·	2.9 km	MPC · JPL
363968	2005 UY_{126}	—	October 24, 2005	Kitt Peak	Spacewatch	·	2.3 km	MPC · JPL
363969	2005 US_{127}	—	October 24, 2005	Kitt Peak	Spacewatch	·	2.0 km	MPC · JPL
363970	2005 UD_{128}	—	October 24, 2005	Kitt Peak	Spacewatch	·	3.2 km	MPC · JPL
363971	2005 US_{131}	—	October 24, 2005	Palomar	NEAT	·	1.4 km	MPC · JPL
363972	2005 UA_{141}	—	October 25, 2005	Catalina	CSS	·	2.3 km	MPC · JPL
363973	2005 UV_{147}	—	October 26, 2005	Kitt Peak	Spacewatch	·	1.6 km	MPC · JPL
363974	2005 UV_{152}	—	October 26, 2005	Kitt Peak	Spacewatch	LIX	3.6 km	MPC · JPL
363975	2005 UU_{154}	—	October 26, 2005	Kitt Peak	Spacewatch	T_{j} (2.99)	4.0 km	MPC · JPL
363976	2005 UN_{158}	—	October 29, 2005	Goodricke-Pigott	R. A. Tucker	·	3.3 km	MPC · JPL
363977	2005 UN_{165}	—	October 24, 2005	Kitt Peak	Spacewatch	·	670 m	MPC · JPL
363978	2005 UJ_{176}	—	October 24, 2005	Kitt Peak	Spacewatch	·	1.0 km	MPC · JPL
363979	2005 UA_{185}	—	October 25, 2005	Mount Lemmon	Mount Lemmon Survey	·	2.6 km	MPC · JPL
363980	2005 UN_{198}	—	October 25, 2005	Kitt Peak	Spacewatch	·	3.1 km	MPC · JPL
363981	2005 UE_{200}	—	October 25, 2005	Kitt Peak	Spacewatch	THM	2.0 km	MPC · JPL
363982	2005 UO_{207}	—	October 27, 2005	Kitt Peak	Spacewatch	KOR	1.3 km	MPC · JPL
363983	2005 UW_{210}	—	October 27, 2005	Mount Lemmon	Mount Lemmon Survey	·	2.7 km	MPC · JPL
363984	2005 UJ_{216}	—	October 25, 2005	Catalina	CSS	·	3.1 km	MPC · JPL
363985	2005 UN_{230}	—	October 25, 2005	Kitt Peak	Spacewatch	·	2.2 km	MPC · JPL
363986	2005 UC_{231}	—	October 25, 2005	Mount Lemmon	Mount Lemmon Survey	AEO	1.1 km	MPC · JPL
363987	2005 UX_{252}	—	October 26, 2005	Kitt Peak	Spacewatch	·	1.9 km	MPC · JPL
363988	2005 UD_{266}	—	October 27, 2005	Kitt Peak	Spacewatch	·	2.2 km	MPC · JPL
363989	2005 UX_{275}	—	October 24, 2005	Kitt Peak	Spacewatch	·	1.7 km	MPC · JPL
363990	2005 UR_{278}	—	October 24, 2005	Kitt Peak	Spacewatch	·	2.3 km	MPC · JPL
363991	2005 UX_{293}	—	October 26, 2005	Kitt Peak	Spacewatch	EOS	1.7 km	MPC · JPL
363992	2005 UR_{308}	—	October 27, 2005	Mount Lemmon	Mount Lemmon Survey	·	2.4 km	MPC · JPL
363993	2005 UW_{313}	—	October 27, 2005	Socorro	LINEAR	·	3.0 km	MPC · JPL
363994	2005 UQ_{315}	—	October 25, 2005	Kitt Peak	Spacewatch	·	2.0 km	MPC · JPL
363995	2005 UT_{315}	—	October 25, 2005	Kitt Peak	Spacewatch	KOR	1.3 km	MPC · JPL
363996	2005 UL_{330}	—	October 28, 2005	Mount Lemmon	Mount Lemmon Survey	·	1.9 km	MPC · JPL
363997	2005 UN_{346}	—	October 30, 2005	Kitt Peak	Spacewatch	·	1.6 km	MPC · JPL
363998	2005 UZ_{363}	—	October 27, 2005	Kitt Peak	Spacewatch	·	2.1 km	MPC · JPL
363999	2005 UB_{371}	—	October 27, 2005	Kitt Peak	Spacewatch	KOR	1.2 km	MPC · JPL
364000	2005 UB_{382}	—	October 26, 2005	Socorro	LINEAR	·	2.1 km	MPC · JPL

back to top

== See also ==
- Meanings of minor-planet names: 363001–364000
