= Meanings of minor-planet names: 363001–364000 =

As minor planet discoveries are confirmed, they are given a permanent number by the IAU's Minor Planet Center (MPC), and the discoverers can then submit names for them, following the IAU's naming conventions. The list below concerns those minor planets in the specified number-range that have received names, and explains the meanings of those names.

Official naming citations of newly named small Solar System bodies are approved and published in a bulletin by IAU's Working Group for Small Bodies Nomenclature (WGSBN). Before May 2021, citations were published in MPC's Minor Planet Circulars for many decades. Recent citations can also be found on the JPL Small-Body Database (SBDB). Until his death in 2016, German astronomer Lutz D. Schmadel compiled these citations into the Dictionary of Minor Planet Names (DMP) and regularly updated the collection.

Based on Paul Herget's The Names of the Minor Planets, Schmadel also researched the unclear origin of numerous asteroids, most of which had been named prior to World War II. This article incorporates text from this source, which is in the public domain: SBDB New namings may only be added to this list below after official publication as the preannouncement of names is condemned. The WGSBN publishes a comprehensive guideline for the naming rules of non-cometary small Solar System bodies.

== 363001–363100 ==
Named minor planet	Provisional	This minor planet was named for...	Ref · Catalog
363018 Wenda	1996 TA_{6}	Wenzhou University, known by the abbreviation Wenda.	IAU · 363018

== 363101–363200 ==
back to top

Named minor planet	Provisional	This minor planet was named for...	Ref · Catalog
363115 Chuckwood	2001 FW_{224}	Charles (Chuck) Wood (born 1942) made fundamental insights into the role of cratering and volcanism in shaping planetary surfaces. He tirelessly promoted science education through numerous books, popular articles and the internet. His development of education programs introduced many students to science.	JPL · 363115
363124 Ciottolimeco	2001 PO_{28}	Elena Ciottoli and Mauro Meco were an Italian married couple passionate about astronomy.	IAU · 363124

== 363201–363300 ==
back to top

Named minor planet	Provisional	This minor planet was named for...	Ref · Catalog
There are no named minor planets in this number range

== 363301–363400 ==
back to top

Named minor planet	Provisional	This minor planet was named for...	Ref · Catalog
There are no named minor planets in this number range

== 363401–363500 ==
back to top

Named minor planet	Provisional	This minor planet was named for...	Ref · Catalog
There are no named minor planets in this number range

== 363501–363600 ==
back to top

Named minor planet	Provisional	This minor planet was named for...	Ref · Catalog
363504 Belleau	2003 UA_{18}	Remy Belleau (1528–1577), a French poet	JPL · 363504
363582 Folpotat	2004 CJ_{3}	The Folpotat, a small river in the Canton of Jura, Switzerland	JPL · 363582

== 363601–363700 ==
back to top

Named minor planet	Provisional	This minor planet was named for...	Ref · Catalog
363623 Chelčický	2004 PC_{105}	Petr Chelčický (c. 1390–1460), a Czech religious thinker and writer from South Bohemia, known for The Net of True Faith, one of precursors of the Reformation.	JPL · 363623

== 363701–363800 ==
back to top

Named minor planet	Provisional	This minor planet was named for...	Ref · Catalog
363706 Karazija	2004 TW_{345}	Romualdas Karazija (born 1942), a Lithuanian theoretical physicist, science popularizer, and textbook author, who is an expert in atomic theory and Auger electron spectroscopy.	IAU · 363706

== 363801–363900 ==
back to top

Named minor planet	Provisional	This minor planet was named for...	Ref · Catalog
There are no named minor planets in this number range

== 363901–364000 ==
back to top

Named minor planet	Provisional	This minor planet was named for...	Ref · Catalog
There are no named minor planets in this number range

back to top

Preceded by 362,001–363,000	Meanings of minor-planet names List of minor planets: 363,001–364,000	Succeeded by 364,001–365,000
