= (363116) 2001 GQ2 =

Near-Earth asteroid

(363116) 2001 GQ_{2}
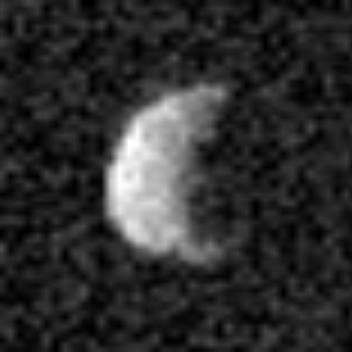
- Image of (363116) 2001 GQ_{2} by the Arecibo Telescope on 29 April 2001.

Discovery
- Discovered by: LINEAR
- Discovery date: 14 April 2001

Designations
- Minor planet category: Apollo ; NEO; PHA

Orbital characteristics
- Aphelion: 1.825 AU
- Perihelion: 0.6035067 AU
- Semi-major axis: 1.2144655 AU
- Eccentricity: 0.5030681 (e)
- Orbital period (sidereal): 1.34 Jyr
- Inclination: 21.82189° (i)
- Argument of perihelion: 280.29358° (ω)
- Earth MOID: 0.00548 AU
- Mercury MOID: 0.22096 AU
- Venus MOID: 0.0415 AU
- Mars MOID: 0.37426 AU
- Jupiter MOID: 3.6637 AU
- Saturn MOID: 7.45757 AU
- Uranus MOID: 16.7457 AU
- Neptune MOID: 28.4312 AU

Physical characteristics
- Mean diameter: 0.296 km
- Absolute magnitude (H): 20.32

(363116) 2001 GQ_{2} is a potentially hazardous asteroid around 296 metres in diameter. It was discovered by the Lincoln Near-Earth Asteroid Research (LINEAR) project on 14 April 2001. It made a close flyby of Earth on 27 April of that same year.

== Description ==
2001 GQ_{2} orbits the Sun at a distance of 0.6035–1.825 astronomical units (AU) every 489 days (1.34 years). Its orbit has an eccentricity of 0.503 and an inclination of 21.822 degrees with respect to the ecliptic.

On 14 April 2001, it was discovered by the LINEAR project. Shortly after its discovery, on 27 April 2001, it passed 465.20 Earth radii from Earth. A few days later on 29 April, the Arecibo Radio Telescope made observations of the asteroid.

Its next approach to Earth will be on 3 November 2065.
